= NASA-ESA Mars Sample Return =

Proposed Mars sample return mission

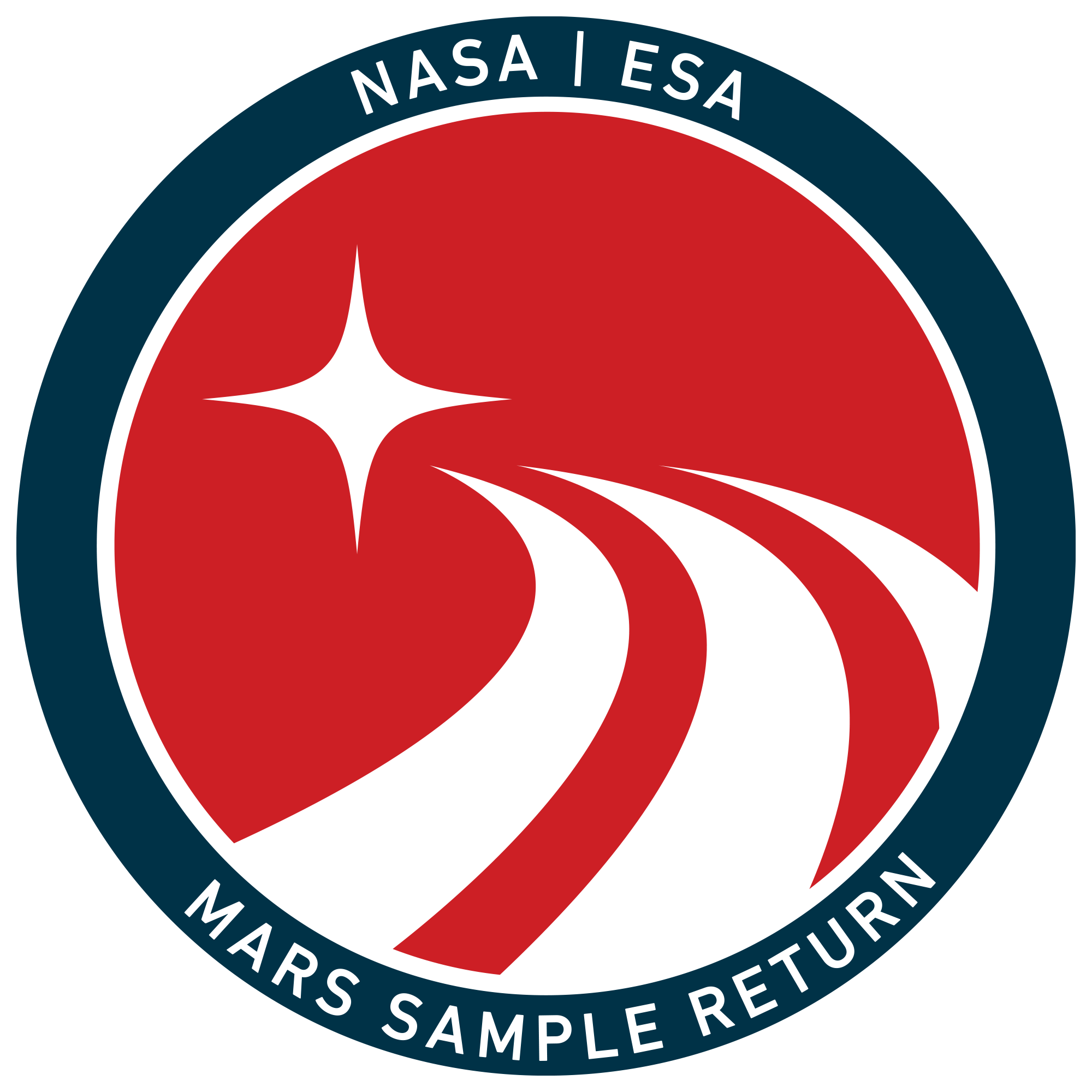
NASA-ESA MSR Patch

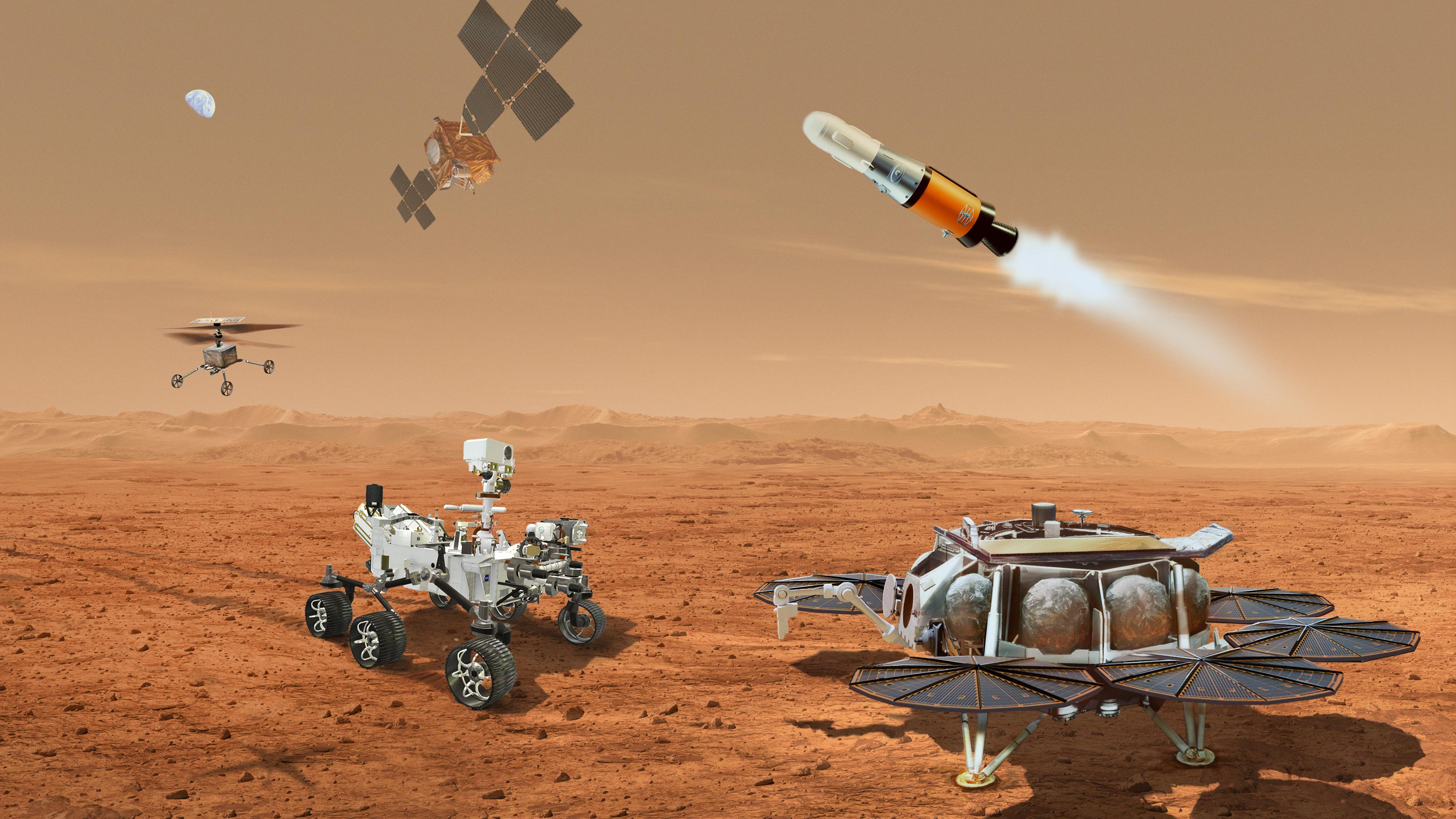
Mars Sample Return Program (Artwork; July 27, 2022)

Mars Sample Return (Video; November 17, 2022)

The NASA-ESA Mars Sample Return was a proposed Flagship-class Mars sample return (MSR) mission to collect Martian rock and soil samples in 43 small, cylindrical, pencil-sized, titanium tubes and return them to Earth around 2033.

The NASA–ESA plan, approved in September 2022, was to return samples using three missions: a sample collection mission (Perseverance), a sample retrieval mission (Sample Retrieval Lander + Mars Ascent Vehicle + Sample Transfer Arm + 2 Ingenuity-class helicopters), and a return mission (Earth Return Orbiter). The mission hoped to resolve the question of whether Mars once harbored life.

Although the proposal never went beyond the design stage, the Perseverance rover is currently gathering samples on Mars.

After a project review critical of its cost and complexity, NASA announced that the project was "paused" as of November 13, 2023. On November 22, NASA was reported to have cut back on the Mars sample-return mission due to a possible shortage of funds. In April 2024, in a NASA update via teleconference, the NASA Administrator emphasized continuing the commitment to retrieving the samples. However, after the $11 billion cost was deemed infeasible, NASA turned to the aerospace industry and the Jet Propulsion Laboratory (JPL) to form a new, more fiscally feasible mission profile to retrieve the samples. In January 2026, Congress confirmed the Trump administration's plan to cancel the project.

== History ==
=== 2001 to 2004 ===
In the summer of 2001, the Jet Propulsion Laboratory requested mission concepts and proposals from industry-led teams (Boeing, Lockheed Martin, and TRW). The science requirements included at least 500 grams (18 oz) of samples, rover mobility to obtain samples at least 1 kilometre (0.62 mi) from the landing spot, and drilling to obtain one sample from a depth of 2 metres (6 ft 7 in). That following winter, JPL made similar requests of the university aerospace engineering departments of MIT and the University of Michigan.

Also in 2001, a separate set of industry studies was done for the Mars ascent vehicle (MAV) due to the uniqueness and key role of the MAV for MSR. Figure 11 in this reference summarizes the need for MAV flight testing at a high altitude over Earth, based on Lockheed Martin's analysis that the risk of mission failure is "extremely high" if launch vehicle components are only tested separately.

In 2003, JPL reported that the mission concepts from 2001 were too costly. A subsequent study yielded a more affordable plan that was accepted by two groups of scientists: a new MSR Science Steering Group and the Mars Exploration Program Analysis Group (MEPAG). Instead of a rover and deep drilling, a scoop on the lander would dig 20 centimetres (7.9 in) deep and place multiple samples together into one container. After five years of technology development, the MAV would be flight-tested twice above Earth before the mission PDR (Preliminary Design Review) in 2009.

Based on the simplified mission plan, assuming a launch from Earth in 2013, two weeks on Mars, and a 2016 return, technology development was initiated to ensure that potential Mars microbes would not contaminate Earth, and also that the Mars samples would not be contaminated with Earth-origin biological materials. The sample container would be clean on the outside before departing from Mars, with installation onto the MAV inside an "Earth-clean MAV garage".

In 2004, JPL published an update on the 2003 plan. MSR would use the new large sky crane landing system in development for the Mars Science Laboratory rover (later named Curiosity). An MSR Technology Board was formed, and it was noted that the use of a rover might return to the MSR plan, in light of the success with the Spirit and Opportunity rovers that arrived early in 2004. A 285-kilogram (628 lb) ascent rocket would carry 0.5-kilogram (1.1 lb) of samples inside a 5-kilogram (11 lb) payload, the Orbiting Sample (OS). The MAV would transmit enough telemetry to reconstruct events in case of failure on the way up to Mars orbit.

=== 2005 to 2008 ===
As of 2005, a rover had returned to the MSR plan, with a rock core drill, in light of results from the Mars Exploration Rover discoveries. Focused technology development would start before the end of 2005 for mission PDR in 2009, followed by launch from Earth in 2013. Related technologies in development included potential advances for Mars arrival (navigation and descent propulsion), and implementing pump-fed liquid launch vehicle technology on a scale small enough for a MAV.

In late 2005, a peer-reviewed analysis showed that ascent trajectories to Mars orbit would differ depending on liquid versus solid propulsion, largely because small solid rocket motors burn faster, requiring a steeper ascent path to avoid excess atmospheric drag, while slower-burning liquid propulsion might take advantage of more efficient paths to orbit.

Early in 2006, the Marshall Space Flight Center noted the possibility that a science rover would cache the samples on Mars, then subsequently a mini-rover would be sent along with the MAV on a sample return lander. Then, either the mini-rover or the science rover would deliver the samples to the lander for loading onto the MAV. A two-stage 250-kilogram (550 lb) solid propellant MAV would be gas ejected from a launch tube. It would carry a 5-kilogram (11 lb) payload—a 16-centimetre (6.3 in) diameter spherical package containing the samples. The second stage would send telemetry, and its steering thrusters would use hydrazine fuel with additives. The authors expected the MAV to need multiple flight tests at a high altitude over Earth.

A peer-reviewed publication in 2007 described testing of autonomous sample capture for Mars orbit rendezvous. Free-floating tests were done on board a NASA aircraft using a parabolic "zero-g" flight path.

In 2007, Alan Stern, then NASA's Associate Administrator for Science, was strongly in favor of completing MSR sooner, and he asked JPL to include sample caching on the Mars Science Laboratory mission (later named Curiosity). A team at the Ames Research Center was designing a hockey puck-sized sample-caching device to be installed as an extra payload on MSL.

A review analysis in 2008 compared Mars ascent to lunar ascent, noting that the MAV would pose not only a technical challenge but also a cultural one for the planetary science community, given that lunar ascent has been done using known technology, and that science missions typically rely on proven propulsion for course corrections and orbit insertion maneuvers, similar to what Earth satellites do routinely.

=== 2009 to 2011 ===
Early in 2009, the In-Space Propulsion Technology project office at the NASA Glenn Research Center (GRC) presented a ranking of six MAV options, concluding that a 285-kilogram (628 lb) two-stage solid rocket with continuous telemetry would be best for delivering a 5-kilogram (11 lb) sample package to Mars orbit. A single-stage pump-fed bipropellant MAV was noted to be less heavy and was ranked second.

Later in 2009, the chief technologist of the Mars Exploration Directorate at JPL referred to a 2008 workshop on MSR technologies at the Lunar and Planetary Institute, and wrote that the particularly difficult technology challenges included the MAV, sample acquisition and handling, and planetary protection. He then further commented that, "The MAV, in particular, stands out as the system with highest development risk, pointing to the need for an early start," leading to flight testing before preliminary design review (PDR) of the lander that would deliver the MAV.

In October 2009, NASA and ESA established the Mars Exploration Joint Initiative to proceed with the ExoMars program, whose ultimate aim was the return of samples from Mars in the 2020s. ExoMars's first mission was planned to launch in 2018, with unspecified missions to return samples in the 2020–2022 time frame. As reported to the NASA Advisory Council Science Committee (NAC-SC) early in 2010, MEPAG estimated that MSR "will cost $8-10B, and it is obvious that NASA and ESA can't fund this amount by themselves." The cancellation of the caching rover MAX-C in 2011, and later NASA withdrawal from ExoMars, due to budget limitations, ended the mission. The pull-out was described as "traumatic" for the science community.

In 2010–2011, the NASA In-Space Propulsion Technology (ISPT) program at the Glenn Research Center received proposals and funded industry partners for MAV design studies with contract options to begin technology development, while also considering propulsion needs for Earth return spacecraft. Inserting the spacecraft into Mars orbit, then returning to Earth, was noted to need a high total of velocity changes, leading to a conclusion that solar electric propulsion could reduce mission risk by improving mass margins, compared to the previously assumed use of chemical propulsion along with aerobraking at Mars. The ISPT team also studied scenarios for MAV flight testing over Earth, and recommended two flight tests prior to MSR mission PDR, considering the historical low probability of initial success for new launch vehicles.

The NASA–ESA potential mission schedule anticipated launches from Earth in 2018, 2022, and 2024 to send (respectively): a sample caching rover, a sample return orbiter, and a sample retrieval lander for a 2027 Earth arrival, with MAV development starting in 2014 after two years of technology development identified by the MAV design studies. The ISPT program summarized a year of propulsion technology progress for improving Mars arrival, Mars ascent, and Earth return, stating that the first flight test of a MAV engineering model would need to occur in 2018 to meet the 2024 launch date for the sample retrieval lander.

The 2011 MAV industry studies were done by Lockheed Martin teamed with ATK, Northrop Grumman, and Firestar Technologies to deliver a 5-kg (11-lb), 16-cm (6.3-inch) diameter sample sphere to Mars orbit. The Lockheed-Martin-ATK team focused on a solid propellant first stage with either solid or liquid propellant for the upper stage, estimated MAV mass in the range 250 to 300 kg (550 to 660 lb), and identified technologies for development to reduce mass. Northrop Grumman (the former TRW) similarly estimated a mass below 300 kg, using pressure-fed liquid bipropellants for both stages, and had plans for further progress. Firestar Technologies described a single-stage MAV design having liquid fuel and oxidizer blended together in one main propellant tank.

In early 2011 the US National Research Council's Planetary Science Decadal Survey, which laid out mission planning priorities for the period 2013–2022, declared an MSR campaign its highest priority Flagship Mission for that period. In particular, it endorsed the proposed Mars Astrobiology Explorer-Cacher (MAX-C) mission in a "descoped" (less ambitious) form. This mission plan (cancelled in April 2011 for budget reasons) had been for NASA and ESA to each build a rover to send together in 2018.

=== 2012 to 2013 ===
In 2012, prospects for MSR were slowed further by a 38-percent cut in NASA's Mars program budget for fiscal year 2013, leading to controversy among scientists over whether Mars exploration could thrive on a series of small rover missions. A Mars Program Planning Group (MPPG) was convened as one response to budget cuts.

In mid-2012, eight weeks before Curiosity arrived on Mars, the Lunar and Planetary Institute hosted a NASA-sponsored three-day workshop to gather expertise and ideas from a wide range of professionals and students—as input to help NASA reformulate the Mars Exploration Program, in response to the latest Planetary Decadal Survey that prioritized MSR, while also faced with recent deep budget cuts. 390 submissions were received, and the 185 people in attendance agreed that "credible steps toward MSR" could be done with reduced funding. The MAX-C rover (ultimately implemented as Mars 2020, Perseverance) was considered beyond financial reach at that time, so the summary report noted that progress toward MSR could include an orbiter mission to test autonomous rendezvous, or a Phoenix-class lander to demonstrate pinpoint landing while delivering a MAV as a technology demonstration. The workshop consisted largely of three breakout group discussions for Technology and Enabling Capabilities, Science and Mission Concepts, and Human Exploration and Precursors.

Wide-ranging discussions were documented by the Technology Panel, which suggested investments for improved drilling and "small is beautiful" rovers with an "emphasis on creative mass-lowering capabilities." The panel stated that MAV "functional technology is not new" but the Mars environment would pose challenges, and referred to MAV technologies as "a risk for most sample return scenarios of any cost range." MAV technology was addressed in numerous written submissions to the workshop, one of which described Mars ascent as "beyond proven technology", (velocity and acceleration in combination for small rockets) and a "huge challenge for the social system", referring to a "Catch-22" dilemma "in which there is no tolerance for new technology if sample return is on the near-term horizon, and no MAV funding if sample return is on the far horizon."

In September 2012, NASA announced its intention to further study MSR strategies as outlined by the MPPG – including a multiple-launch scenario, a single-launch scenario, and a multiple-rover scenario – for a mission beginning as early as 2018. A "fetch rover" would retrieve the sample caches and deliver them to a Mars ascent vehicle (MAV). In July 2018, NASA contracted Airbus to produce a "fetch rover" concept. As of late 2012, It was determined that the MAX-C rover concept to collect samples could be implemented for a launch in 2020 (Mars 2020), within available funding, using spare parts and mission plans developed for NASA's Curiosity Mars rover

In 2013, the NASA Ames Research Center proposed that a SpaceX Falcon Heavy could deliver two tons of useful payload to the Mars surface, including an Earth return spacecraft that would be launched from Mars by a one-ton single-stage MAV using liquid bipropellants fed by turbopumps. The successful landing of the Curiosity rover directly on its wheels (August 2012) motivated JPL to take a fresh look at carrying the MAV on the back of a rover. A fully guided 300-kg MAV (like Lockheed Martin's 2011 two-stage solid) would avoid the need for a round-trip fetch rover. A smaller 150-kg MAV would permit one rover to also include sample collection while using MSL heritage to reduce mission cost and development time; placing most development risk on the MAV.

JPL later presented more details of the 150-kg solid propellant mini-MAV concept of 2012, in a summary of selected past efforts. The absence of telemetry data during the 1999 loss of the Mars Polar Lander had put an emphasis on "critical event communications", that was subsequently applied to MSR. Then, after the MSL landing in 2012, requirements had been revisited with a goal to reduce MAV mass. Single fault tolerance and continuous telemetry data to Mars orbit were questioned. For the 500 grams (1.1 lb) of samples, a 3.6-kg (7.9 lb) payload was deemed possible instead of 5 kg (11 lb). The 2012 mini-MAV concept had single-string avionics, in addition to the spin-stabilized upper stage without telemetry.

=== 2014 to 2017 ===
In 2014–2015, JPL analyzed many options for Mars ascent, including solid, hybrid, and liquid propellants, for payloads ranging from 6.5 kg to 25 kg. Four MAV concepts using solid propellant had two stages, while one or two stages were considered for hybrid and liquid propellants. Seven options were scored for ten attributes ("figures of merit"). A single-stage hybrid received the highest overall score, including the most points for reducing cost and, separately, for reducing complexity, with the fewest points for technology readiness. Second overall was a single-stage liquid bi-propellant MAV using electric pumps. A pressure-fed bi-propellant design was third, with the most points for technology readiness. Solid propellant options had lower scores, partly due to receiving very few points for flexibility. JPL and NASA Langley Research Center cautioned that the high thrust and short burn times of solid rocket motors would result in early burnout at a low altitude with substantial atmosphere remaining to coast through at high Mach numbers, raising stability and control concerns. With concurrence from the Mars Program Director, a decision was made in January 2016 to focus limited technology development funds on advancing a hybrid propellant MAV (liquid oxidizer with solid fuel).

Starting in 2015, a new effort for planetary protection moved the backward planetary protection function from the surface of Mars to the sample Return Orbiter, to "break-the-chain" in flight. Concepts for brazing, bagging, and plasma sterilization were studied and tested, with a primary focus on brazing, as of 2016.

=== 2018 to 2022 ===
In April 2018, a letter of intent was signed by NASA and ESA that provided a basis for a Mars sample-return mission. The agreement came out of the 2nd International Mars Sample Return Conference in Berlin, Germany. The conference program was archived along with 125 technical submissions that covered sample science (anticipated findings, site selection, collection, curation, analysis) and mission implementation (Mars arrival, rovers, rock drills, sample transfer robotics, Mars ascent, autonomous orbit rendezvous, interplanetary propulsion, Earth arrival, planetary protection). In one of many presentations, an international science team noted that collecting sedimentary rock samples would be required to search for ancient life. A joint NASA-ESA presentation described the baseline mission architecture, including sample collection by the Mars 2020 Rover derived from the MAX-C concept, a Sample Retrieval Lander, and an Earth Return Orbiter. An alternative proposal was to use a SpaceX Falcon Heavy to decrease mission cost while delivering more mass to Mars and returning more samples. Another submission to the Berlin conference noted that mission cost could be reduced by advancing MAV technology to enable a significantly smaller MAV for a given sample payload.

In July 2019, a mission architecture was proposed. JPL authors summarized sample retrieval, including a sample fetch rover, options for fitting 20 or 30 sample tubes into a 12-kilogram (26 lb) payload on a 400-kilogram (880 lb) single-stage-to-orbit (SSTO) MAV that would use hybrid propellants—a liquid oxidizer with a solid wax fuel, which had been prioritized for propulsion technology development since 2016. Meanwhile, the Marshall Space Flight Center (MSFC) presented a comparison of solid and hybrid propulsion for the MAV. Later in 2019, MSFC and JPL had collaborated on designing a two-stage solid propellant MAV, and noted that an unguided spinning upper stage could reduce mass, but this approach was abandoned at the time due to the potential for orbital variations.

Early in 2020 JPL updated the overall mission plan for an orbiting sample package (the size of a basketball) containing 30 tubes, showing solid and hybrid MAV options in the range 400 to 500 kilograms (880 to 1,100 lb). Adding details, MSFC presented designs for both the solid and hybrid MAV designs, for a target mass of 400 kilograms (880 lb) at Mars liftoff to deliver 20 or 30 sample tubes in a 14-to-16-kilogram (31 to 35 lb) payload package. In April 2020, an updated version of the mission was presented. The decision to adopt a two-stage solid rocket MAV was followed by Design Analysis Cycle 0.0 in the spring of 2020, which refined the MAV to a 525-kilogram (1,157 lb) design having guidance for both stages, leading to reconsideration of an unguided spin-stabilized second stage to save mass.

In October 2020, the MSR Independent Review Board (IRB) released its report recommending overall that the MSR program proceed, then in November NASA responded to detailed IRB recommendations. The IRB noted that MSR would have eight first-time challenges, including the first launch from another planet, autonomous orbital rendezvous, and robotic sample handling with sealing to "break-the-chain". The IRB cautioned that the MAV will be unlike any previous launch vehicle, and experience shows that the smaller a launch vehicle, the more likely it is to end up heavier than designed. Referring to the unguided upper stage of the MAV, the IRB stated the importance of telemetry for critical events, "to allow useful reconstruction of a fault during second stage flight." The IRB indicated that the most probable mission cost would be $3.8 to $4.4B. As reported to the NAC-SC in April 2021, the Planetary Science Advisory Committee (PAC) was "very concerned about the high cost" of MSR, and wanted to be sure that astrobiology considerations would be included in plans for returned sample laboratories.

Early in 2022 MSFC presented the guided-unguided MAV design for a 125-kilogram (276 lb) mass reduction, and documented remaining challenges including aerodynamic complexities during the first stage burn and coast to altitude, a desire to locate hydrazine steering thrusters farther from the center of mass, and stage separation without tip-off rotation. While stage separation and subsequent spin-up would be flight tested, the authors noted that it would be ideal to flight test an entire flight-like MAV, but there would be a large cost.

In April 2022, the United States National Academies released the Planetary Science Decadal Survey report for 2023-2032, a review of plans and priorities for the upcoming ten years - after many committee meetings starting in 2020, with consideration of over 500 independently submitted white papers, more than 100 regarding Mars, including comments on science and technology for sample return. The published document noted NASA's 2017 plan for a "focused and rapid" sample return campaign with essential participation from ESA, then recommended, "The highest scientific priority of NASA's robotic exploration efforts this decade should be completion of Mars Sample Return as soon as is practicably possible." Decadal white papers emphasized the importance of MSR for science, included a description of implementing MSR, and noted that the MAV has been underestimated despite needing flight performance beyond the state of the art for small rockets, needs a sustained development effort, and that technology development for a smaller MAV has the potential to reduce MSR mission cost. Decadal Survey committee meetings hosted numerous invited speakers, notably a presentation from the MSR IRB.

As of March 2022, separate landers were planned for the fetch rover and the MAV, because together they would be too large and heavy for a single lander. A cost-saving plan as of July was to send only one lander with the MAV, and rely on the Perseverance rover to pass sample tubes to the MAV in the absence of a fetch rover. Two new lightweight helicopters on the MAV lander would serve as a backup for moving the samples on Mars.

=== 2023 to 2024 ===
At the start of 2023 it was revealed that a "Mars Sample Fetch Helicopter" had been envisioned since at least 2021 by the team at AeroVironment that created Ingenuity to fly in the thin atmosphere of Mars. In a public budget meeting in March, NASA noted the high cost of MSR and had begun to assemble a second independent review board (MSR IRB-2) to assess the design, schedule, and required funding. The IRB-2 began working in May 2023 and released its report in September 2023.

In January 2024, a related proposed NASA plan had been challenged due to budget and scheduling considerations, and a newer overhaul plan undertaken. The American Institute of Aeronautics and Astronautics contrasted the mission cost challenge with the science value of returned samples, noting that multiple in-situ science missions could be done for the cost of MSR, but that an electron microscope for example would be too large to send to Mars. A response in March described the high mission cost as related to the size of the MAV and its huge lander, offering that innovation could lead to a smaller MAV.

In April 2024, NASA formally responded to the IRB-2 report, with a report from the MIRT (MSR IRB Response Team) which noted the cost-saving value of a smaller MAV. On April 15, 2024, NASA Administrator Bill Nelson and Science Mission Director Nicola Fox announced the organization's response to the September 2023 independent review board's investigation, notably the finding that Mars Sample Return at its current design and cost, originally estimated at $7 billion with Earth re-entry by 2033, would now cost more than an unacceptable $11 billion and end in Earth re-entry no sooner than 2040. In response, Nelson and Fox stated that NASA would make requests to industry the next day to come up with alternatives that would likely utilize more proven mission architectures with longer heritages and comply with the board's recommendations, with responses preferred by fall 2024. They also said they would spend $310 million on the program for fiscal year 2024. On April 22, a public meeting was held to explain NASA's April 16 request for proposals to revisit alternative mission architectures.

In June 2024, following the agency's decision to open the mission to industry proposals, seven firms were selected to move forward in a 90-day mission study.

In late July during the Tenth International Conference on Mars, JPL researchers announced that a newly acquired sample had the strongest potential yet for evidence of life. Presentations included plans for sample handling and curation upon return to Earth, including scientific equipment needed in the Sample Receiving Facility Another poster presentation described flight testing for launching off Mars, noting that a MAV could go a thousand miles if tested above Earth, farther than one-ton missiles, and that a smaller MAV for affordable delivery to Mars would likely need new technology resulting from iterative building and flight testing.

=== 2025 to 2026 ===
In January 2025, NASA announced it would be pursuing two potential paths forward to land the MAV. The first option would use the sky crane method used for Curiosity and Perseverance, and the second would "capitalize on using new commercial capabilities". Both options would use the ESA's Earth Return Orbiter to receive and ferry the samples.

In February 2025, Space News published a summary of the MAV challenge, noting the absence of established expertise, given a lack of other missions or customers that would need something like a MAV to stimulate investment. Another opinion piece in March described a suggestion from Rocket Lab for a firm fixed-price mission to return the samples, using a single-stage liquid propellant MAV.

On March 31, a public meeting of the National Academies Committee on Astrobiology and Planetary Sciences included an update from Donya Douglas-Bradshaw, the new MSR Program Director at NASA headquarters. In summarizing the 2024 study results from industry and NASA teams, she noted that a smaller MAV is viable and extremely important, permitting the use of a heritage lander based on the JPL sky crane. New features would include "breaking the chain" on Mars instead of in Mars orbit (for backward planetary protection), and the use of RTG electricity instead of solar panels. She said that MSFC redesigned the two-stage solid propellant MAV from 450 kg to 350 kg without adding risk. On April 30, Douglas-Bradshaw presented a similar update to MEPAG, then in response to a question added that Rocket Lab had not submitted a proposal to NASA regarding the fixed-price MSR mission concept.

In May 2025, the Trump administration released its fiscal year 2026 budget proposal for NASA, in which they planned to cancel the MSR program on the American side. In January 2026, U.S. Congress confirmed that MSR will not be funded, thus the mission can be considered cancelled.

The MEPAG meeting in April 2026 included short presentations, at least two related to future hopes for the cached samples. One agenda item was "Marslab: A Mission Concept to Analyze Perseverance Return Samples In Situ" by Andrew Steele of the Carnegie Institution of Washington. Another talk referred to expertise for Mars ascent as having little overlap to existing propulsion expertise, with a statement that Mars ascent needs more originality than spacecraft propulsion. In June, a meeting of the National Academies (NASEM) Space Studies Board included a detailed presentation by Andrew Steele and Antonio Elias for the proposed concept to analyze the samples on Mars.

At the MEPAG meeting in November 2026 the Director of the Mars Exploration Program, NASA Science Mission Directorate, revealed a new initiative to determine a strategy for Perseverance Sample Retrieval Architecture (PSRA), with a PSRA Strategy Team kickoff in January 2027. A commenter suggested that the PSRA team should seek expertise related to innovation culture for a miniature rocket to reach Mars orbit, as opposed to assuming that procedural propulsion engineering will suffice as for other science missions.

== Sample collection ==
The Mars 2020 mission landed the Perseverance rover, which is storing samples to be returned to Earth later.

=== Mars 2020 Perseverance rover ===
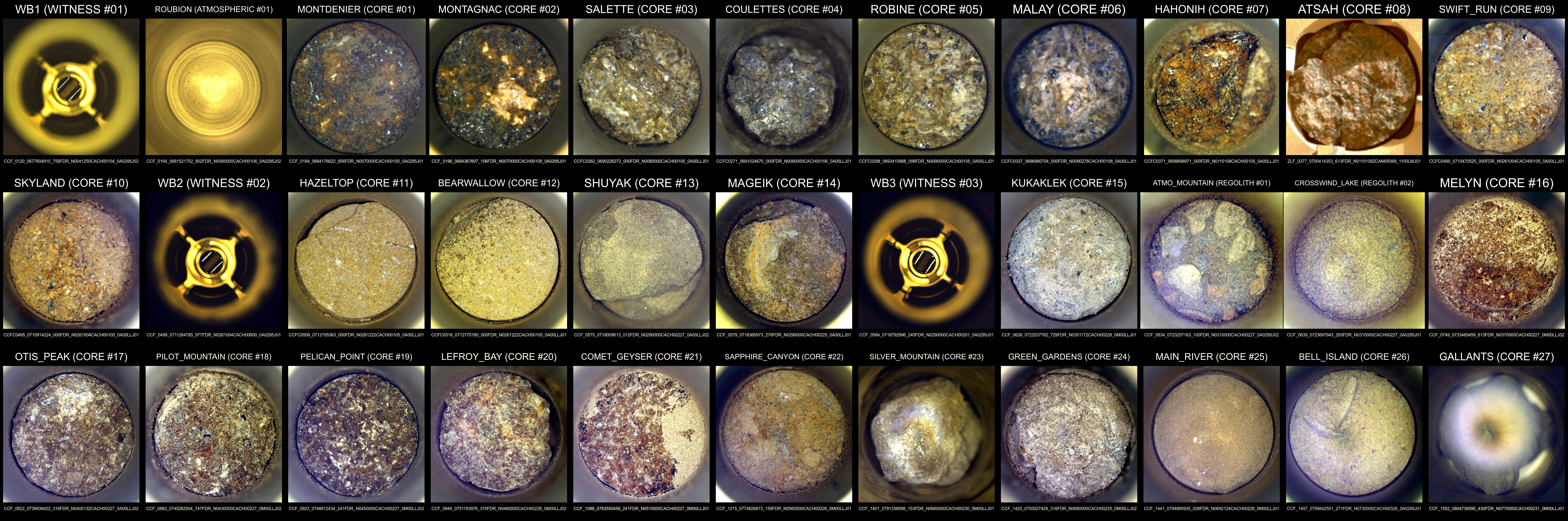
Perseverance rover - cored rock sample collection at 1574 sols (July 24, 2025)

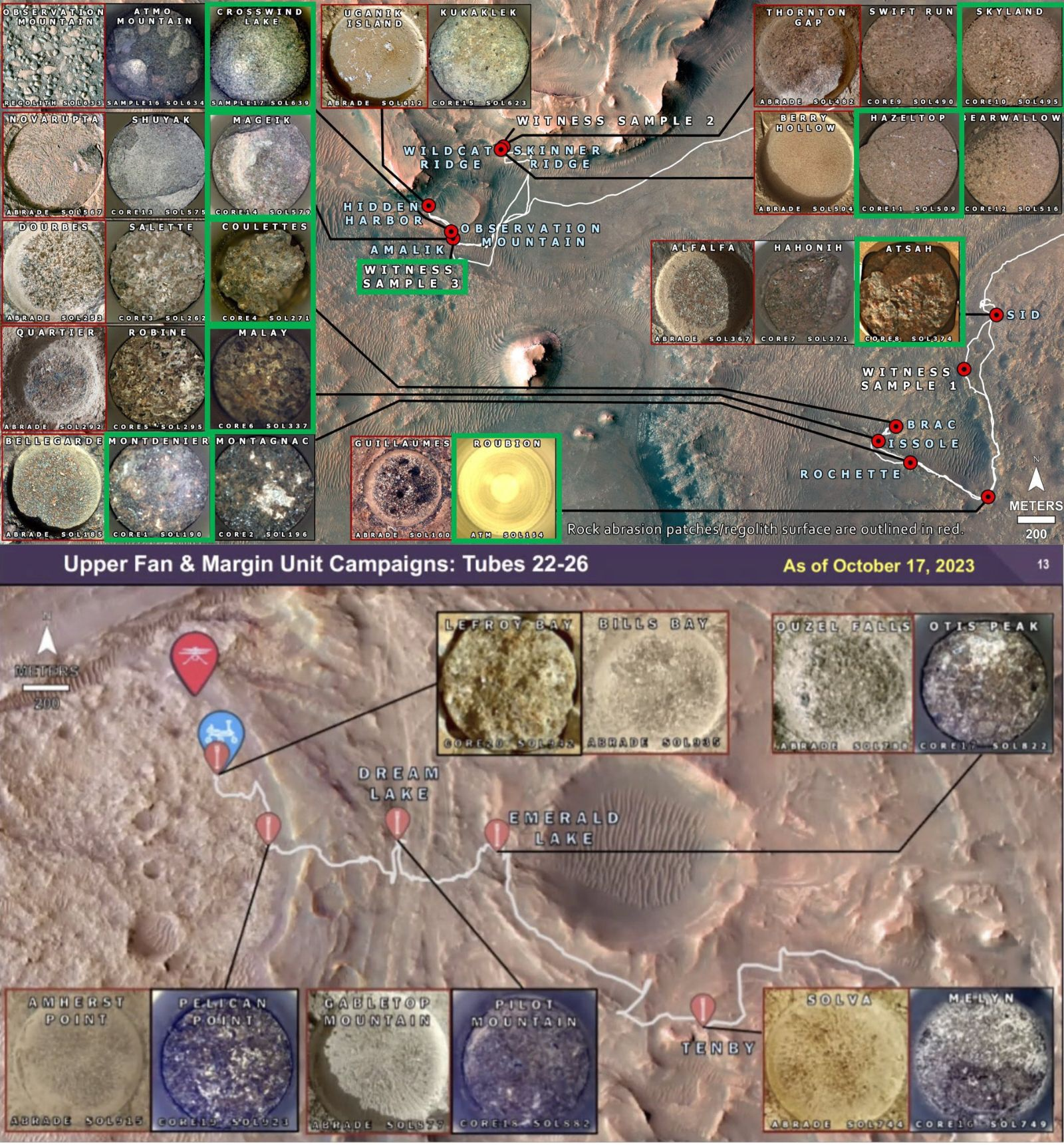
Mapping Perseverance's samples collected to date (The 10 duplicate samples left behind at Three Forks Sample Depot are framed in green colour.)

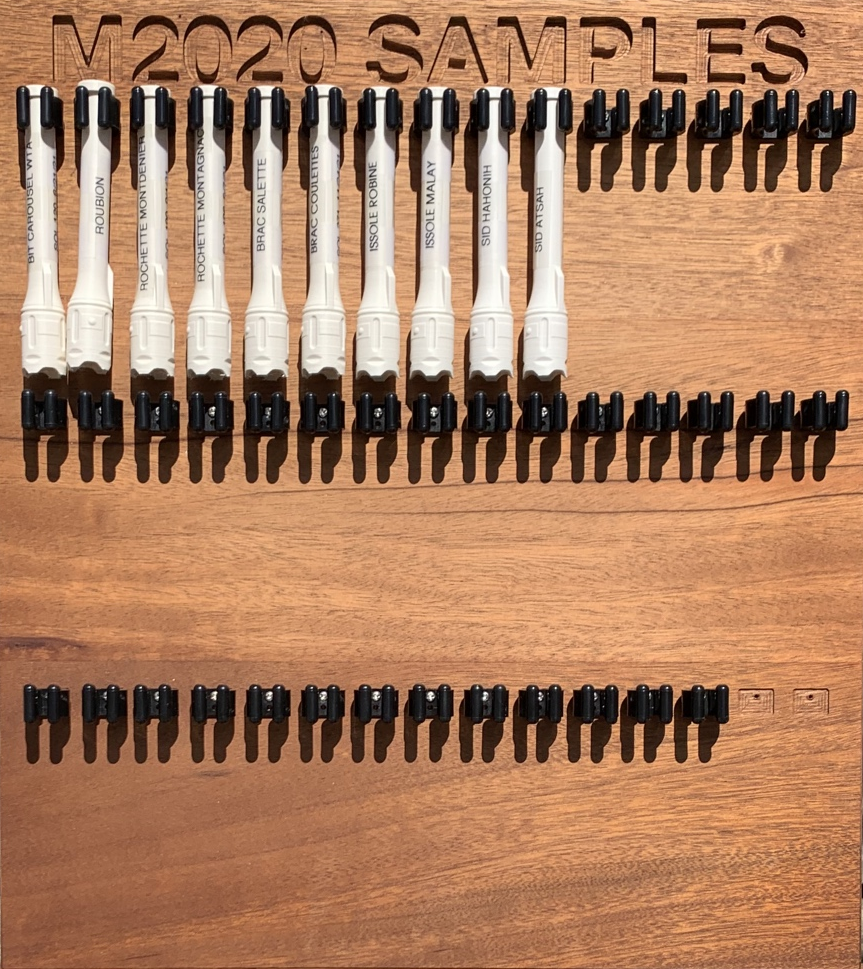
Facsimiles of Perseverance's sample tubes at JPL in Southern California

The Mars 2020 mission landed the Perseverance rover in Jezero crater in February 2021. It collected multiple samples and packed them into cylinders for later return. Jezero appears to be an ancient lakebed, suitable for ground sampling.

At the beginning of August 2021, Perseverance made its first attempt to collect a ground sample by drilling out a finger-size core of Martian rock. This attempt did not succeed. A drill hole was produced, as indicated by instrument readings, and documented by a photograph of the drill hole. However, the sample container turned out to be empty, indicating that the rock sampled was not robust enough to produce a solid core.

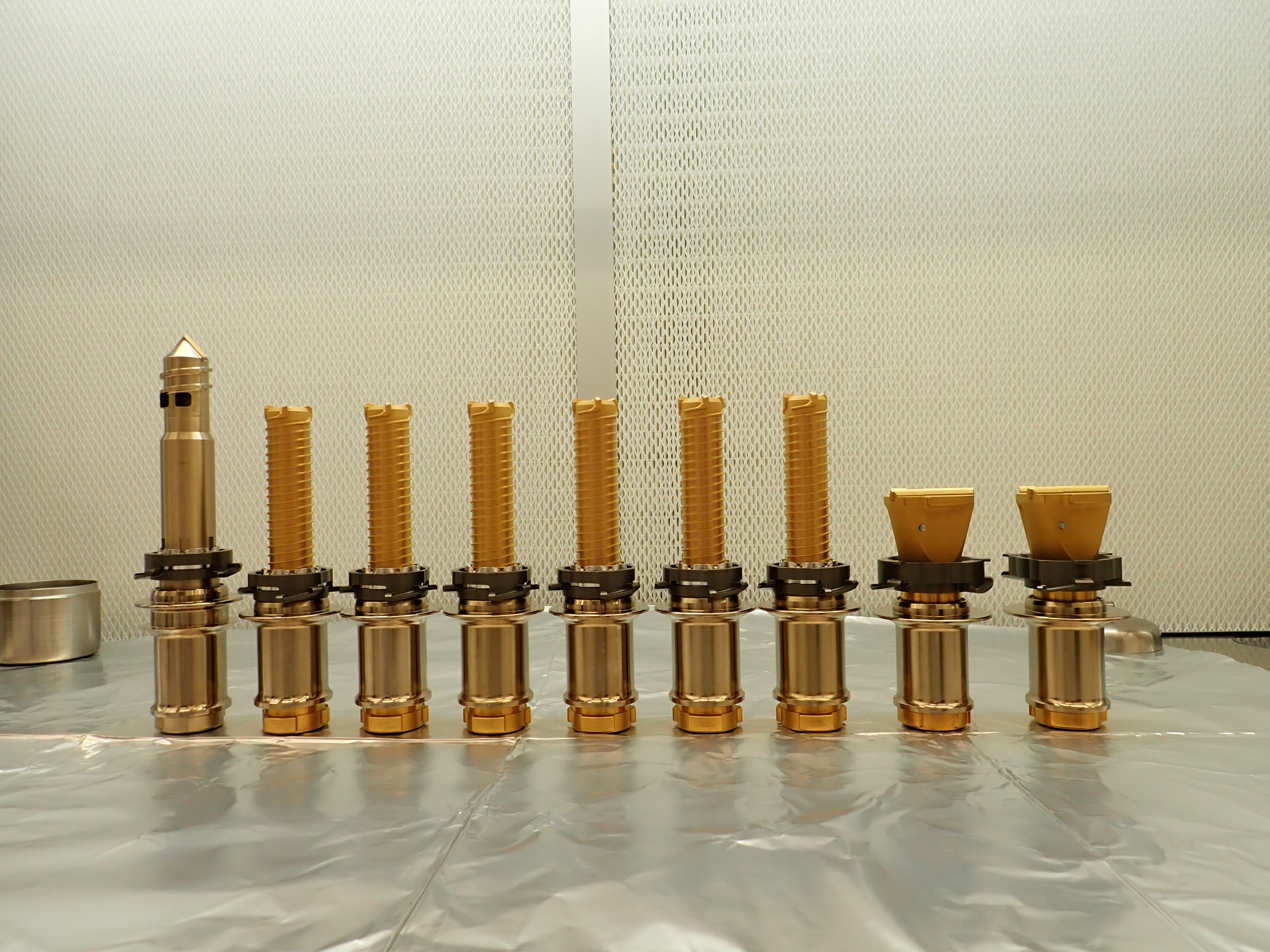
Perseverance's sampling bits: Far left: One pointed regolith drill; Middle: Six rock drills; Right: Two shorter abrasion tools

A second target rock, judged to have a better chance to yield sufficiently robust material, was sampled at the end of August and the beginning of September 2021. After abrading the rock, cleaning away dust by puffs of pressurized nitrogen, and inspecting the resulting rock surface, a hole was drilled on September 1. A rock sample appeared to be in the tube, but it was not immediately placed in a container. A new procedure of inspecting the tube optically was performed. On September 6, the process was completed, with the first sample placed in a container.

In support of the NASA-ESA Mars Sample Return, rock, regolith (Martian soil), and atmosphere samples are being cached by Perseverance. As of July 2025, 33 out of 43 sample tubes have been filled, including 8 igneous rock samples, 13 sedimentary rock sample tubes, 3 Igneous/Impactite rock sample tubes, a Serpentinite rock sample tube, a Silica-cemented carbonate rock sample tube, two regolith sample tubes, an atmosphere sample tube, and three witness tubes. Before launch, 5 of the 43 tubes were designated "witness tubes" and filled with materials that would capture particulates in the ambient environment of Mars. Out of 43 tubes, 3 witness sample tubes will not be returned to Earth and will remain on rover as the sample canister will only have 30 tube slots. Further, 10 of the 43 tubes are left as backups at the Three Forks Sample Depot.

However, after a project review critical of its cost and complexity, NASA announced that the Mars Sample Return project was "paused" as of November 13, 2023. In a teleconference on April 15, 2024, NASA Administrator Bill Nelson emphasized continuing the commitment to retrieving the samples. However, the $11 billion cost was deemed infeasible. NASA turned to industry and the Jet Propulsion Laboratory (JPL) to form a new, more fiscally feasible mission profile to retrieve the samples.

From December 21, 2022 Perseverance started a campaign to deposit 10 of its collected samples at the backup depot, Three Forks. This work was completed on January 28, 2023.

== List of samples cached ==
Sample Tube Status

Left at Three Forks Sample Depot
Remain stowed in the Rover

Sample Details
Sampling Attempt	Date	Tube No.	Seal No.	Ferrule Prefix (Note: Based on CacheCam Images)	Ferrule No.	Contents	Sample Name and Image during Caching (Note: The witness tubes not involving use of drill bits or using regolith drill bit are displayed by cachecam images)	Sample Depot Deposit Date, Spot and Image	Rock Name	Core Length (Note: measured by volume stations)	Estimated Martian Atmosphere Headspace Gas (Note: measured by volume stations)	Location	Notes
1	June 22, 2021 (Sol 121)	SN061	SN147	10464848-7	SN090	Witness Tube (Empty)	WB-1		N/A	N/A	2.2 × 10^{−6} mol	North Séítah Unit	This was taken as a dry-run in preparation for later sampling attempts, and did not aim to sample a rock. During final pre-launch activities, this witness tube was activated (the inner seal was punctured to begin accumulation) and placed in the Bit Carousel. This tube will therefore have accumulated contaminants for the entire duration of exposure from a few months before launch through cruise and EDL until it was sealed on the surface of Mars. Given its long exposure, it is likely that the inner surfaces of WB1 will be saturated with organic contaminants, i.e., they will be in adsorption equilibrium with their immediate surroundings in the rover (and or the entire spacecraft prior to landing). WB1 is therefore expected to have higher concentrations of contaminants, and potentially different contaminants, than the sample tubes.
2	August 6, 2021 (Sol 165)	SN233	SN025	10464848-7	SN062	Atmospheric Gas	Roubion (failed attempt of caching rock sample)	January 4, 2023 (Sol 667) at Three Forks Sample Spot "4"	Roubion; 18.42767°N 77.45167°E	N/A	4.9 × 10^{−6} mol	Polygon Valley, Cratered Floor Fractured Rough Unit	Attempted to sample a rock consisting of Basaltic lava flow or sandstone or Microgabbro but did not succeed, as they didn't reach the bit carousel, and the caching system stored and sealed an empty tube. However, in this process, it collected atmospheric samples.
3	September 6, 2021 (Sol 195)	SN266	SN170	10464848-6	SN099	Basalt (or possibly basaltic sandstone) Rock Sample	Montdenier	January 10, 2023 (Sol 673) at Three Forks Sample Spot "6"	Rochette; 18.43074°N 77.44433°E	5.98 cm (2.35 in)	1.2 × 10^{−6} mol	Arturby Ridge, Citadelle, South Séítah Unit	Successful sample.
4	September 8, 2021 (Sol 197)	SN267	SN170	10464848-6	SN074	Basalt (or possibly basaltic sandstone) Rock Sample	Montagnac		Rochette; 18.43074°N 77.44433°E	6.14 cm (2.42 in)	1.3 × 10^{−6} mol	Arturby Ridge, Citadelle, South Séítah Unit	Sampled from same rock as previous sample.
5	November 15, 2021 (Sol 263)	SN246	SN194	10464848-5	SN107	Olivine cumulate Rock Sample	Salette		Brac; 18.43398°N 77.44305°E	6.28 cm (2.47 in)	1.1 × 10^{−6} mol	Brac Outcrop, South Séítah Unit	
6	November 24, 2021 (Sol 272)	SN284	SN219	10464848-6	SN189	Olivine cumulate Rock Sample	Coulettes	January 6, 2023 (Sol 669) at Three Forks Sample Spot "5"	Brac; 18.43398°N 77.44305°E	3.30 cm (1.30 in)	2.5 × 10^{−6} mol	Brac Outcrop, South Séítah Unit	
7	December 22, 2021 (Sol 299)	SN206	SN184	10464848-7	SN064	Olivine cumulate Rock Sample	Robine		Issole; 18.43264°N 77.44134°E	6.08 cm (2.39 in)	1.0 × 10^{−6} mol	Issole, South Séítah Unit	
8	December 29, 2021 (Sol 307)	SN261	SN053	10464848-6	SN062	Olivine cumulate Rock Sample	Pauls (Abandoned sample from this site due to Core Bit Dropoff.)	December 21, 2022 (Sol 653) at Three Forks Sample Spot "1"	Issole; 18.43264°N 77.44134°E	N/A	N/A	Issole, South Séítah Unit	Pebble-sized debris from the first sample fell into the bit carousel during transfer of the coring bit, which blocked the successful caching of the sample. It was decided to abandon this sample and do a second sampling attempt again. Subsequent tests and measures cleared remaining samples in tube and debris in caching system The tube was reused for second sample attempt, which was successful. It was the first sample tube to be deposited at a Sample Depot (in this case the depot is Three Forks).
9	January 31, 2022 (Sol 338)	SN261	SN053	10464848-6	SN062	Olivine cumulate Rock Sample	Malay (During Caching)	December 21, 2022 (Sol 653) at Three Forks Sample Spot "1"	Issole; 18.43264°N 77.44134°E	3.07 cm (1.21 in)	2.7 × 10^{−6} mol	Issole, South Séítah Unit	Pebble-sized debris from the first sample fell into the bit carousel during transfer of the coring bit, which blocked the successful caching of the sample. It was decided to abandon this sample and do a second sampling attempt again. Subsequent tests and measures cleared remaining samples in tube and debris in caching system The tube was reused for second sample attempt, which was successful. It was the first sample tube to be deposited at a Sample Depot (in this case the depot is Three Forks).
10	March 7, 2022 (Sol 372)	SN262	SN172	10464848-6	SN129	Basaltic andesite Rock Sample	Ha'ahóni (aka "Hahonih")		Sid; 18.45242°N 77.44386°E	6.50 cm (2.56 in)	0.98 × 10^{−6}mol	Ch'ał outcrop(100 m (330 ft) east of Octavia E. Butler Landing), Séítah Unit	
11	March 13, 2022 (Sol 378)	SN202	SN168	10464848-4	SN074	Basaltic andesite Rock Sample	Atsá (aka "Atsah")	January 20, 2023 (Sol 682) at Three Forks Sample Spot "9"	Sid; 18.45242°N 77.44386°E	6.00 cm (2.36 in)	1.3 × 10^{−6} mol	Ch'ał outcrop(100 m (330 ft) east of Octavia E. Butler Landing), Séítah Unit	
12	July 7, 2022 (Sol 491)	SN186	SN188	10464848-4	SN101	Clastic Sedimentary Rock Sample	Swift Run		Skinner Ridge; 18.40617°N 77.45893°E	6.69 cm (2.63 in)	1.23 × 10^{−6} mol	Skinner Ridge, Delta Front	First Deltaic and First sedimentary sample cached by Perseverance.
13	July 12, 2022 (Sol 495)	SN272	SN192	10464848-6	SN068	Clastic Sedimentary Rock Sample	Skyland	January 18, 2023 (Sol 680) at Three Forks Sample Spot "8"	Skinner Ridge; 18.40617°N 77.45893°E	5.85 cm (2.30 in)	1.7 × 10^{−6} mol	Skinner Ridge, Delta Front	
14	July 16, 2022 (Sol 499)	SN205	SN119	10464848-6	SN170	Witness Tube (Empty)	WB2		N/A	N/A	2.7 × 10^{−6} mol	Hogwallow Flats, Delta Front	This may have been done to clean out any leftover debris during the previous sampling attempts. On sol 495, a string-like piece of foreign object debris (FOD) similar to materials released during EDL was observed in the workspace images. On sol 499 this object was no longer observed, presumably because it blew out of the scene. This observation suggests the possibility of FOD in tubes sealed in this general area.
15	July 27, 2022 (Sol 510)	SN172	SN157	10464848-7	SN099	Fine grained, well-sorted sedimentary rock sample, sulphate-bearing coarse mudstone Rock Sample	Hazeltop		Wildcat Ridge; 18.40589°N 77.45863°E	5.97 cm (2.35 in)	1.63 × 10^{−6} mol	Wildcat Ridge, Delta Front	
16	August 3, 2022 (Sol 517)	SN259	SN177	10464848-5	SN110	Fine grained, well-sorted sedimentary rock sample, sulphate-bearing coarse mudstone Rock Sample	Bearwallow	January 13, 2023 (Sol 675) at Three Forks Sample Spot "7"	Wildcat Ridge; 18.40589°N 77.45863°E	6.24 cm (2.46 in)	1.43 × 10^{−6} mol	Wildcat Ridge, Delta Front	
17	October 2, 2022 (Sol 575)	SN264	SN068	10464848-5	SN085	Fine grained, well-sorted sedimentary rock, olivine-bearing coarse mudstone	Shuyak		Amalik outcrop 77.40144°N 18.45073°E	5.55 cm (2.19 in)	1.73 × 10^{−6} mol	Amalik outcrop, Delta Front	
18	October 6, 2022 (Sol 579) – November 16, 2022 (Sol 589)	SN184	SN587	10464848-4	SN030	Fine grained, well-sorted sedimentary rock, olivine-bearing coarse mudstone Rock Sample	Mageik	December 23, 2022 (Sol 655) at Three Forks Sample Spot "2"	Amalik outcrop 77.40144°N 18.45073°E	7.36 cm (2.90 in)	0.63 × 10^{−6} mol	Amalik outcrop, Delta Front	The anomaly first appeared on Oct 5 after the successful coring of the mission's 14th sample, called "Mageik", when the seal assigned to cap the rock-core-filled sample tube did not release as expected from its dispenser. The process of sealing a sample happens in the rover's Sampling and Caching System. During sealing, a small robotic arm moves the rock-core-filled tube to one of seven dispensers and presses its open end against a waiting seal. On the 17 previous occasions when a sample tube had been sealed during the mission, the seal was pressed fully into the tube. That allowed the seal to be extracted from the dispenser and the arm to move the seal-tube combination to a different station where they are pressed together, creating a hermetic seal. However, when the sample handling system attempted to dispense a seal in the tube of the Mageik sample, the seal encountered too much resistance and did not come free. The sampling system automatically detected the lack of seal and stored the unsealed tube safely so the tube and sample hardware remain in a stable configuration. One of the possible causes of the seal's nondeployment may be that Martian dust adhered to a location on the tube's interior surface where the dust could impede successful coupling and extraction. To ensure a hermetic seal, the tolerances between tube and seal are, by necessity, extremely small: 0.00008 inches (0.002 mm). The rover's CacheCam captured images showing light deposits of dust on the tube's lip, but the camera's imaging capabilities along the tube's inner surface are quite limited. Sealing which was tried again and again was finally completed on November 16, 2022 (Sol 589) successfully.
19	October 14, 2022 (Sol 586)	SN188	SN153	10464848-5	SN073	Witness Tube (Empty)	WB3	January 28, 2023 (Sol 690) at Three Forks Sample Spot "10"	N/A	N/A	2.31 × 10^{−6} mol	Amalik outcrop, Delta Front	The witness tubes do not collect samples but are opened near the sampling location to "witness" the Martian environment. The witness tubes go through the motions of sample collection without collecting rock or soil samples and are sealed and cached like Martian samples. Witness tubes aim to ensure that any potential Earth contaminants are detected during sample collection. This is to provide the validity of the samples once returned to Earth for analysis. During the processing of the WTA, two faults occurred. On sol 584 there was a fault during the simulated coring which resulted in only 5 of the normally 7 spindle/percuss motions being performed, and no percuss-to-ingest motion was executed. While anomaly recovery was being undertaken, the tube remained in the corer and exposed to the Martian environment about 10 times longer than normal WTA/sample exposure time. A second fault occurred after the sealing of the tube on sol 586, and left the hermetically sealed WTA sitting in the sealing station at an elevated temperature (up to 40 °C) until sol 591. The witness tube was successfully sealed on October 14, 2022 (Sol 587) and placed into storage on October 19, 2022 (Sol 592).
20	November 24, 2022 (Sol 627) – November 29, 2022 (Sol 632)	SN242	SN151	10464848-5	SN113	Fine grained, moderately-sorted sedimentary rock, sulphate-bearing coarse sandstone Rock Sample	Kukaklek		Hidden Harbor; 77.39911°N 18.45364°E	4.97 cm (1.96 in)	1.78 × 10^{−6} mol	Hidden Harbor, Delta Front	First Sample from an abrasion patch, abraded earlier on the rock. It was sampled on November 29, 2022 (Sol 632)
21	December 2, 2022 (Sol 635)	SN059	SN098	10464848-5	SN063	Regolith Sand Sample, likely containing mixed sedimentary and igneous grains	Atmo Mountain		Observation Mountain; 77.40122°N 18.45131°E	5.30 cm (2.09 in)	1.87 × 10^{−6} mol	Observation Mountain, Delta Front	First Regolith Sample.
22	December 7, 2022 (Sol 639)	SN173	SN191	10464848-6	SN106	Regolith Sand Sample, likely containing mixed sedimentary and igneous grains	Crosswind Lake	December 29, 2022 (Sol 661) at Three Forks Sample Spot "3"	Observation Mountain; 77.40122°N 18.45131°E	5.30 cm (2.09 in)	1.88 × 10^{−6} mol	Observation Mountain, Delta Front	
23	March 30, 2023 (Sol 749)	SN214	SN066	1064848-5	SN150	Fine/medium grained sandstone Rock Sample	Melyn		Berea Outcrop; 77.383946°N 18.470216°E	6.04 cm (2.38 in)	1.5 × 10^{−6} mol	Berea, Tenby, Upper Fan	First Sample taken after completion of sample depot and the first taken under the new mission campaign.
24	May 23, 2023 (Sol 802)	SN254	SN056	10464848-3	SN064	medium granule-pebble conglomerate Conglomerate Sedimentary Rock Sample	N/A (Abandoned sample from this site due to small sample collection.)		Onahu outcrop 77.368526°N 18.433455°E	1.30 cm (0.51 in) (Non-Cached)	N/A	Onahu, Upper Fan	The first attempt yielded a sample that was unfortunately too small, and the second attempt was unsuccessful and caching would have resulted in another empty Roubion atmospheric sample tube. A conglomerate rock is of special interest to the Science Team because they are made up of many clasts of rocks. These distinct clasts become cemented together over time to form the conglomerate. Importantly, these clasts were likely transported to Jezero crater from much farther away. Analyzing the distinct clasts and cements captured in a sample of the conglomerate would give insights into where these materials were sourced, how far they traveled, and what the martian environment was like, both when the clasts first formed and when the conglomerate rock formed.
25	June 4, 2023 (Sol 814)	SN254	SN056	10464848-3	SN064	medium granule-pebble conglomerate Conglomerate Sedimentary Rock Sample	N/A (Abandoned after failed attempt of collecting rock sample)		Onahu outcrop 77.368526°N 18.433455°E	N/A	N/A	Onahu, Upper Fan	
26	June 23, 2023 (Sol 832)	SN254	SN056	10464848-3	SN064	medium granule-pebble conglomerate Conglomerate Sedimentary Rock Sample	Otis Peak		Emerald Lake; 77.368179°N 18.482989°E	5.77 cm (2.27 in)	1.3 × 10^{−6} mol	Emerald Lake, Upper Fan	
27	July 27, 2023 (Sol 865)	SN258	SN451	10464848-4	SN196	medium granule-pebble conglomerate Conglomerate Sedimentary Rock Sample	N/A (Abandoned sample from this site due to small sample collection.)		Dream Lake; 77.360466°N 18.483799°E	N/A	N/A	Dream Lake, Upper Fan	The first attempt yielded a sample that was unfortunately too small and caching would have resulted in another empty Roubion atmospheric sample tube.
28	September 15, 2023 (Sol 914)	SN258	SN451	10464848-4	SN196	medium granule-pebble conglomerate Conglomerate Sedimentary Rock Sample	Pilot Mountain		Dream Lake; 77.360466°N 18.483799°E	6.00 cm (2.36 in)	1.2 × 10^{−6} mol	Dream Lake, Upper Fan	The first attempt yielded a sample that was unfortunately too small and caching would have resulted in another empty Roubion atmospheric sample tube.
29	September 23, 2023 (Sol 922)	SN178	SN024	10464848-6	SN113	medium to coarse sandstone with alteration phases (or possibly an altered igneous rock) Rock Sample	Pelican Point		Hans Amundsen Memorial Workspace; 77.360466°N 18.483799°E	6.10 cm (2.40 in)	1.23 × 10^{−6} mol	Hans Amundsen Memorial Workspace, Margin Unit	
30	October 21, 2023 (Sol 949)	SN263	SN018	10464848-6	SN089	medium to coarse sandstone with alteration phases (or possibly an altered igneous rock) Rock Sample	Lefroy Bay		Turquoise Bay; 77.350646°N 18.483458°E	4.70 cm (1.85 in)	1.61 × 10^{−6} mol	Turquoise Bay, Margin Unit	
31	March 11, 2024 (Sol 1087)	SN174	SN214	10464848-6	SN026	coarse sandstone or altered (Silica-cemented Carbonate, serpentinized) mafic to ultramafic igneous Rock Sample	Comet Geyser		Bunsen Peak; 77.327214°N 18.491870°E	5.78 cm (2.28 in)	1.52 × 10^{−6} mol	Bunsen Peak, Margin Unit	
32	July 21, 2024 (Sol 1216)	SN244	SN227		SN226	fine-grained sulfate-veined sedimentary rock with dominantly clay/silt-size grains sedimentary Rock Sample	Sapphire Canyon		Cheyava Falls; 77.305147°N 18.497477°E	6.2 cm (2.4 in)	1.30 × 10^{−6} mol	Cheyava Falls, Crater Rim	Contains supposed biological signatures, one of the first to be found on Mars, that might be due to ancient Martian microbial life.
33	January 28, 2025 (Sol 1402)					Igneous/impactite	Silver Mountain		Shallow Bay; 77.264743°N 18.460591°E	2.91 cm (1.15 in)		Witch Hazel Hill, Crater Rim	
34	March 2, 2025 (Sol 1434)		SN140	10464848-6	SN071	Serpentinite	Green Gardens		Tablelands; 77.264658°N 18.460594°E	7.19 cm (2.83 in)		Witch Hazel Hill, Crater Rim	
35	March 10, 2025 (Sol 1441)					Igneous/impactite	Main River		Broom Point; 77.258466°N 18.461733°E	4.32 cm (1.70 in)		Witch Hazel Hill, Crater Rim	
35	May 7, 2025 (Sol 1498) (Non-Cached)					Igneous/impactite	Bell Island		Pine Pond; 77.257898°N 18.462247°E	5 cm (2.0 in)-7 cm (2.8 in)		Witch Hazel Hill, Crater Rim	The Bell Island sample tube was intentionally left unsealed; the new practice maintains flexibility while exploring new targets, without diminishing the quality of the Bell Island sample, the mission team determined.
36	July 2, 2025 (Sol 1552)					Igneous or Sedimentary	Gallants		Salmon Point	1.91 cm (0.75 in)		Krokodillen, Crater Rim	

=== Sample and depot overview ===
Samples Tubes Cached (77%)
Samples Tubes Left at Three Forks Sample Depot (100%)

=== Type of cached samples ===
Samples By Type
1. Witness (3) (9.09%)
2. Atmospheric (1) (3.03%)
3. Igneous (9) (27.3%)
4. Sedimentary (13) (39.4%)
5. Regolith (2) (6.06%)
6. Silica-cemented carbonate (1) (3.03%)
7. Igneous/Impactite (3) (9.09%)
8. Serpentinite (1) (3.03%)

=== Drilled holes ===
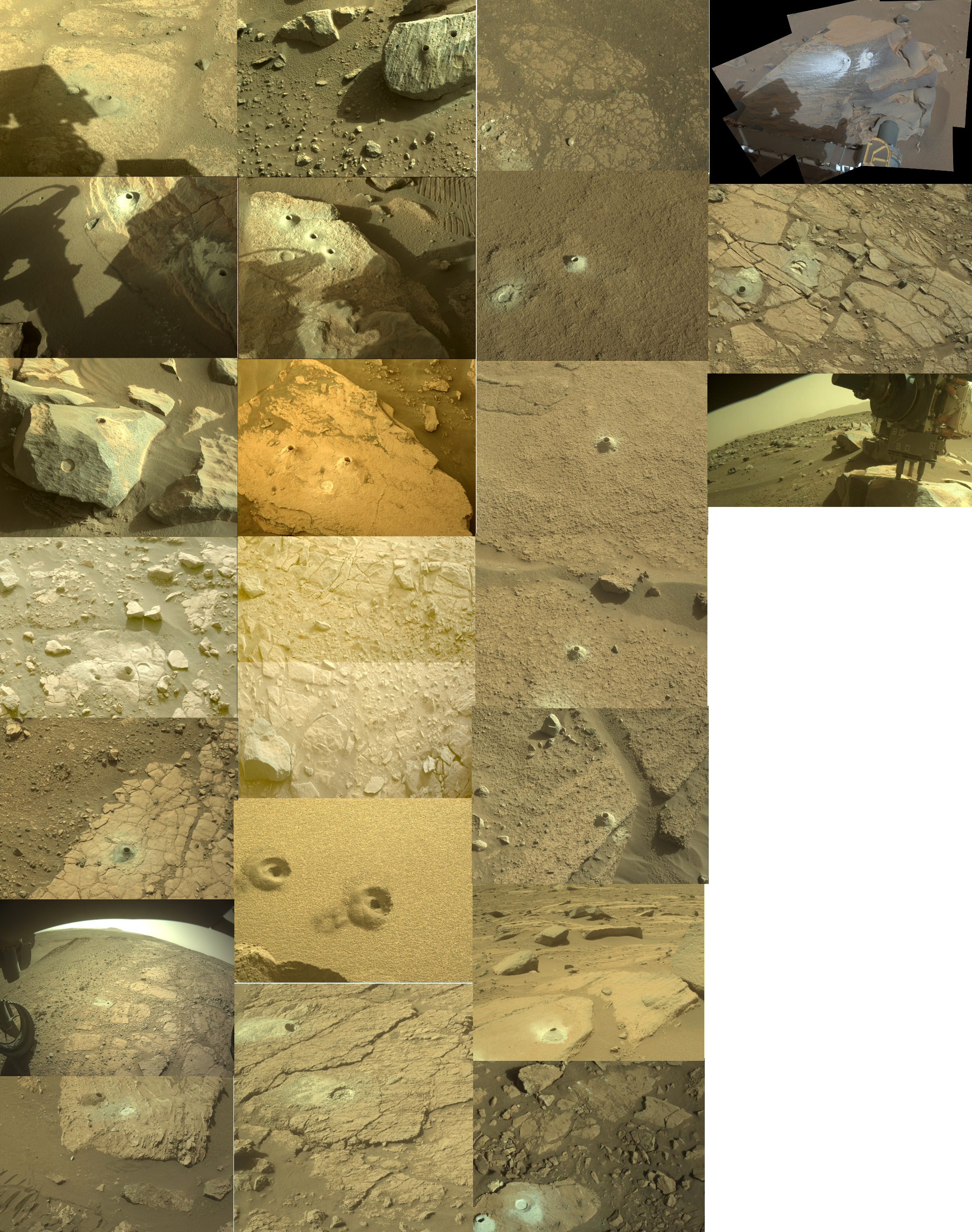
All drilled holes on Mars by Perseverance as of now (Scrollable image)

=== Sample Depot at Three Forks ===
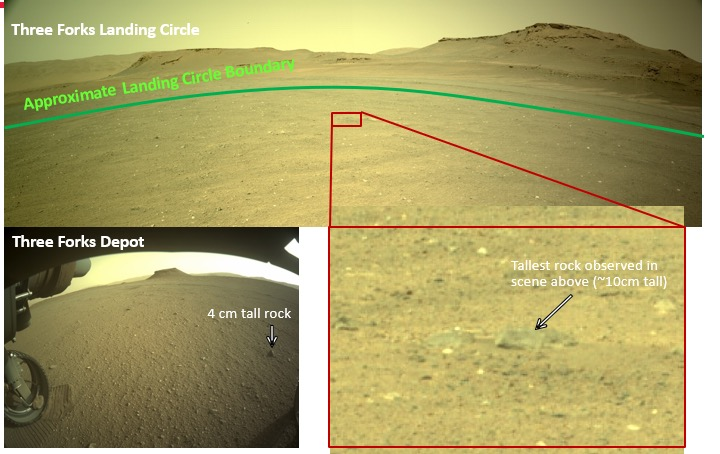
Mars Sample Depot at Three Forks

== Three Forks Sample Depot ==
After nearly a Martian year of NASA's Perseverance Mars rover's science and sample caching operations for the MSR campaign, the rover deposited one sample from each of ten pairs that it has cached, at Three Forks Sample Depot - as NASA plans to eventually return them to Earth. The process of depositing the samples started December 19, 2022, and was completed January 28, 2023. This depot will serve as a backup spot, in case Perseverance cannot deliver the ten samples that it retains. Perseverance is depositing the backup samples on relatively flat terrain, in an area known as Three Forks, so that NASA and ESA can recover them during successive missions in the MSR campaign. Three Forks is also selected as the backup landing spot for the Sample Retrieval Lander. It is a relatively benign place, as flat and smooth as a table top.

Testing a sample drop in the Mars Yard with VSTB OPTIMISM Rover

Perseverance's complex Sampling and Caching System takes almost an hour to retrieve the metal tube from inside the rover's belly, view it one last time with its internal Cachecam, and drop the sample ~0.89 m (2 ft 11 in) onto a carefully selected patch of Martian surface.

Mars Perseverance rover – wind lifts a massive dust cloud (June 18, 2021)

The tubes will not be piled up at a single spot. Instead, each tube-drop location will have an "area of operation" ~5.5 m (18 ft) in diameter. To that end, the tubes will be deposited on the surface in an intricate zigzag pattern of 10 spots for 10 tubes, with each sample ~5 m (16 ft) to ~15 m (49 ft) apart from one another near the proposed Sample Retrieval Lander's landing site. There are various reasons for this plan, but it mostly hinges on the design of the sample recovery helicopters. They are designed to interact with only one tube at a time. They will takeoff from near the Sample Return Lander, touch down near the sample tube, drive to the precise location for retrieval, then fly back to the SRL for delivery to the ascent vehicle. As of January, 2025, NASA has not settled on a design for the Sample Return Lander.

Perseverance views dust devils swirling across Jezero Crater

Before and after Perseverance drops each tube, mission controllers will review a multitude of images from the rover's SHERLOC WATSON camera. Images by the SHERLOC WATSON camera are also used to ensure that the tube had not rolled into the path of the rover's wheels. They also look to ensure the tube had not landed in such a way that it was standing on its end (each tube has a flat end piece called a "glove" to make it easier to be picked up by future missions). This occurred less than 5% of the time during testing with Perseverance's Earthly twin OPTIMISM in JPL's Mars Yard. In case it does happen on Mars, the mission has written a series of commands for Perseverance to carefully knock the tube over with part of the turret at the end of its robotic arm.

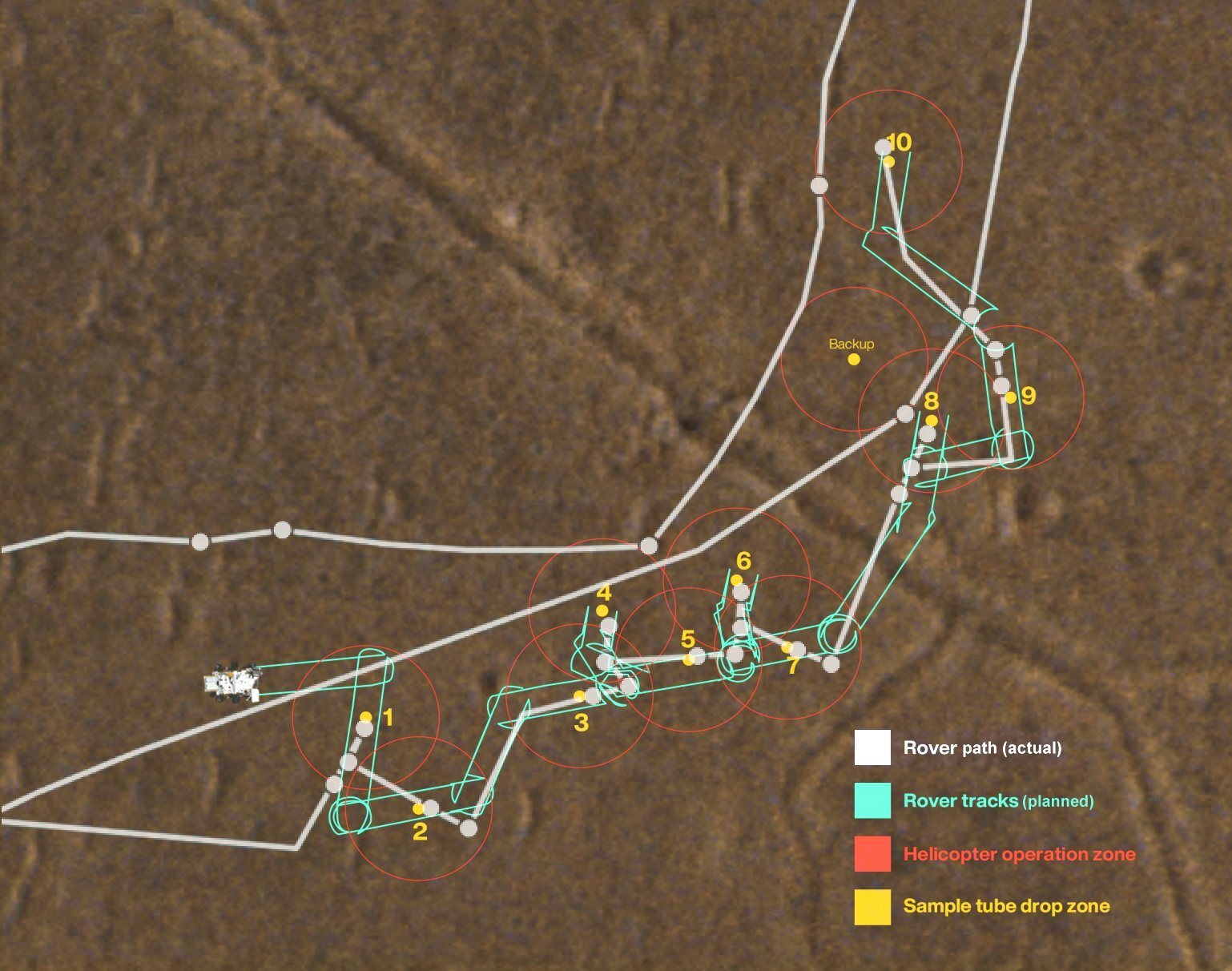
Map of Perseverance' sample depots

These SHERLOC WATSON camera images will also give the Mars Sample Return team the precise data necessary to locate the tubes in the event of the samples becoming covered by dust or sand before they are collected. Mars does get windy, but not like on Earth, as the atmosphere on Mars is 100 times less dense than that of Earth's atmosphere, so winds on Mars can pick up speed (the fastest are Dust devils), but they don't pick up a lot of dust particles. Martian wind can certainly lift fine dust and leave it on surfaces, but even if significant dust is accumulated, these images of the depositing pattern will aid in recovery.

Once the task of depositing the 10 samples was completed, Perseverance carried on with its mission, traversing to the crater floor and scaling Delta's summit. The rover traversed along the edge of the crater, caching more tubes, now following the plan of taking a single sample at each site. Previously, samples were collected in pairs, and one sample from each pair was placed at the depot. The other member of each pair remains on board the rover.

== Sample retrieval ==
Earlier in its design process, The Mars Sample Return mission consisted of the ESA Sample Fetch Rover, an associated second lander, and the Mars ascent vehicle to get back to orbit, from where the samples will be launched back to Earth. After consideration and cost overruns, it was decided that, given Perseverance's expected longevity, the extant rover will be the primary means of transporting samples to the Sample Retrieval Lander (SRL).

=== Sample Retrieval Lander ===
The sample retrieval mission involves launching a 5-solar array sample return lander in 2028, with the Mars Ascent Vehicle and two sample recovery helicopters as a backup for Perseverance. The SRL lander is about the size of an average two-car garage weighing ~3,375 kg (7,441 lb); tentatively planned to be 7.7 m (25 ft) wide and 2.1 m (6.9 ft) high when fully deployed. The payload mass of the lander is double that of the Perseverance rover, that is, ~563 kg (1,241 lb). The lander needs to be close to the Perseverance rover to facilitate the transfer of Mars samples. It must land within 60 m (200 ft) of its target site – much closer than previous Mars rovers and landers. Thus, it will have a secondary battery to power the lander. The lander would take advantage of an enhanced version of NASA's successful Terrain Relative Navigation that helped land Perseverance safely. The new Enhanced Lander Vision System would, among other improvements, add a second camera, an altimeter, and better capabilities to use propulsion for precision landing. It is planned to land near Three Forks in 2029.

==== Sample Transfer Arm ====
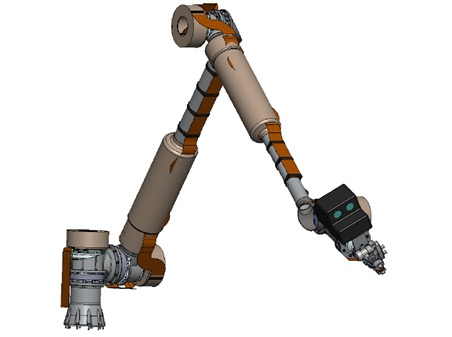
ESA Sample Transfer Arm

The Mars 2020 rover and helicopters would transport the samples to the SRL lander. SRL's ESA-built ~2.40 m (7.9 ft) long, Sample Transfer Arm would be used to extract the samples and load them into the Sample Return Capsule in the Ascent Vehicle.

=== Mars Sample Recovery Helicopters ===
The MSR campaign includes Ingenuity-class helicopters, both of which will collect the samples with the help of a tiny robotic arm and move them to the SRL, in case the Perseverance rover runs into problems.

=== Mars Ascent Vehicle (MAV) ===
Mars Ascent Vehicle
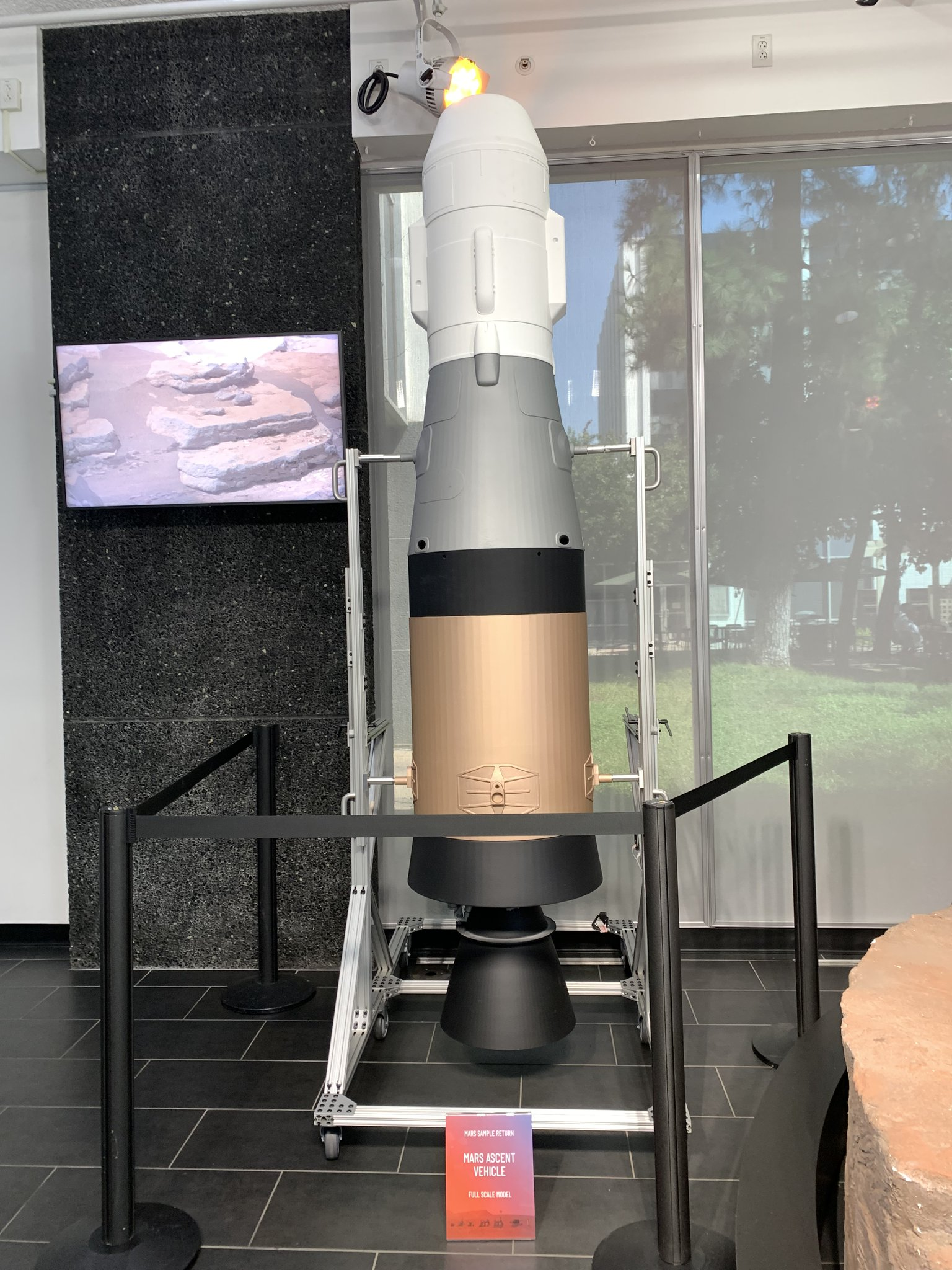
- Mars Ascent Vehicle mockup on display.
- Function: Mars Orbital launch vehicle
- Manufacturer: NASA's Marshall Space Flight Center/Lockheed Martin/Northrop Grumman
- Country of origin: United States

Size
- Height: 2.26 m (7.4 ft)
- Diameter: 0.5 m (1.6 ft)
- Mass: 450 kg (990 lb)
- Stages: 2

Capacity

Payload to LAO
- Altitude: 500 km (310 mi)
- Mass: 500 g (18 oz)

Launch history
- Status: Under Development
- Launch sites: Vector mid-air after release from Sample Retrieval Lander, Three Forks, Jezero Crater
- Total launches: 1 (planned)
- UTC date of spacecraft launch: 2030 (planned)
- Carries passengers or cargo: Orbiting Sample Container with 30–43 tubes, Radio Beacon (hosted)

First stage
- Powered by: 1 optimized Star 20 (Altair 3)
- Burn time: 75 s
- Propellant: CTPB

Second stage
- Powered by: 1 optimized Star 15G
- Burn time: 20 s
- Propellant: HTPB

Mars Ascent Vehicle (MAV) was planned as a two-stage, solid-fueled rocket that would deliver the collected samples from the surface of Mars to the Earth Return Orbiter. Early in 2022, Lockheed Martin was awarded a contract to partner with NASA's Marshall Space Flight Center in developing the MAV and engines from Northrop Grumman. It is planned to be catapulted upward as high as 4.5 m (15 ft) above the lander – or 6.5 m (21 ft) above the Martian surface just before it ignites, to remove the odds of liftoff issues such as slipping or tilting because of the rocket's sheer weight and exhaust. The front would be tossed a bit harder than the back, causing the rocket to point upward, toward the Martian sky. The Vertically Ejected Controlled Tip-off Release (VECTOR) system adds a slight rotation during launch, pitching the rocket up and away from the surface.

The MAV would enter a 380-kilometre (240 mi) orbit. It will remain stowed inside a cylinder on the SRL, and will have a thermal protective coating. The rocket's first stage (SRM-1) would burn for 75 seconds. The SRM1 engine can gimbal, but most gimballing solid-rocket motor nozzles can't handle the extreme cold MAV will experience, so the Northrop Grumman team had to come up with something that could: a state-of-the-art trapped-ball nozzle featuring a supersonic split-line. After SRM1 burnout, the MAV will remain in a coast period for approximately 400 seconds. During this time, the MPA aerodynamic fairing and entire first stage will separate from the vehicle.

After stage separation, the second stage will initiate a spin-up via side-mounted, small-scale RCS thrusters. The entire second stage will be unguided and spin-stabilized at a rate of approximately 175 RPM. Having achieved the target spin rate, the second stage (SRM-2) will ignite and burn for approximately 18–20 seconds, raising the periapsis and circularizing the orbit. The second stage is planned to be spin-stabilized to save weight, in lieu of active guidance, but the Mars samples will result in an unknown payload mass distribution. Spin stabilization allows the rocket to be lighter, so it won't have to carry active control all the way to orbit.

Following SRM2 burnout, the second stage will coast for up to 10 minutes, while residual thrust from the SRM2 occurs. Small, side-mounted de-spin motors will then fire, reducing the spin rate to less than 40 RPM. Once the target orbit has been achieved, the MAV will command the MPA to eject the Orbiting Sample Container (OS). The spent second stage of the MAV will remain in orbit, broadcasting a radio beacon signal for up to 25 days. This will aid in the capture of the OS by the ERO.

MAV was scheduled to be launched in 2028 onboard the SRL lander.

Components of the Sample Return Landers

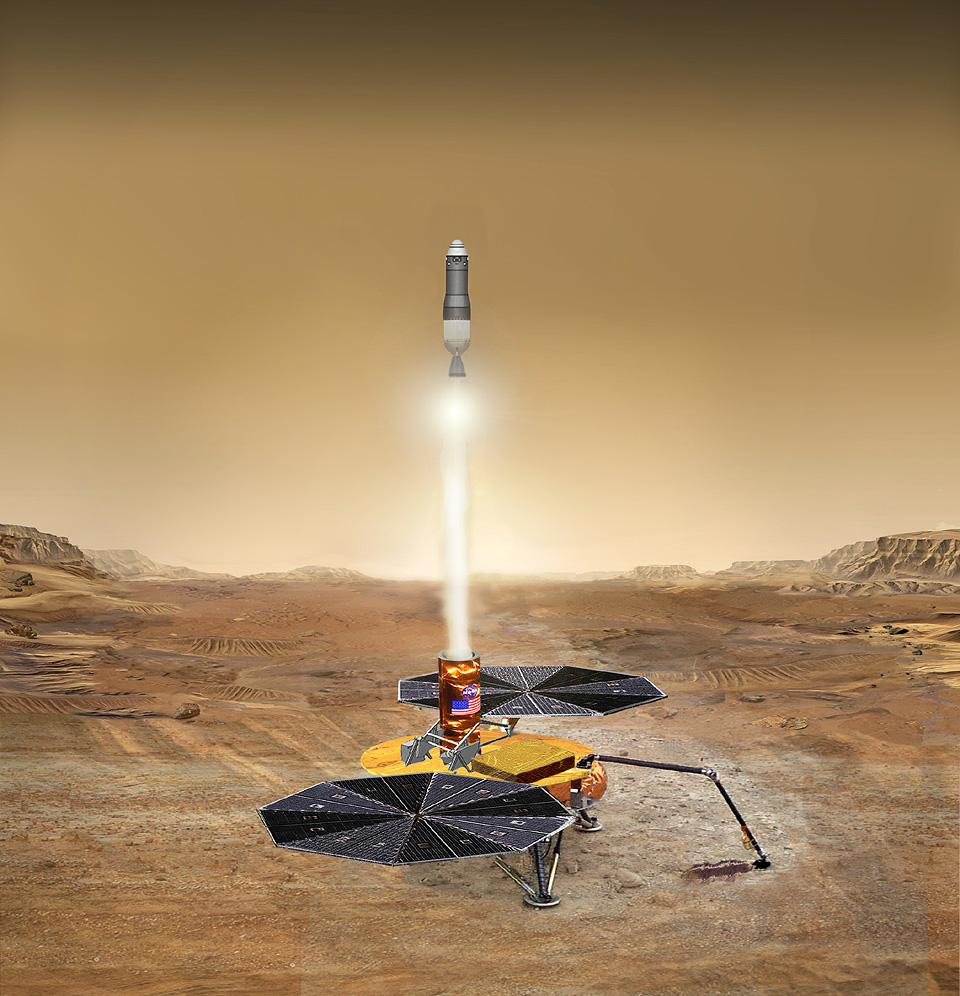
Concept launch set-up

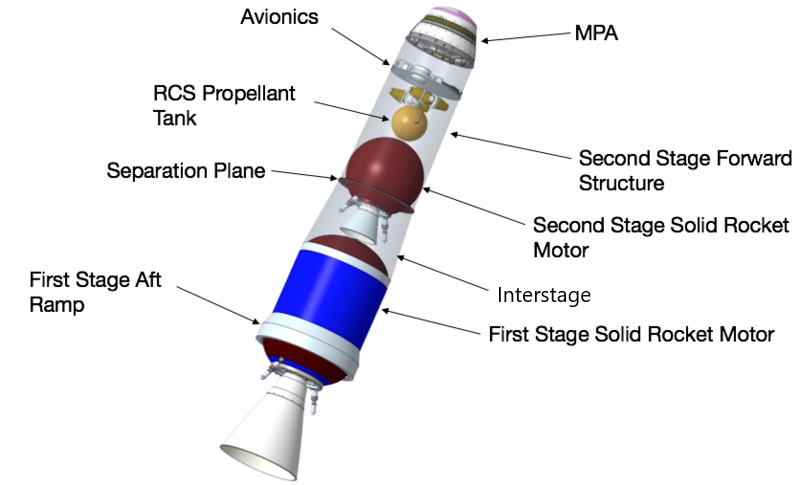
Interior design of MAV, First Extraterrestrial Staging Rocket

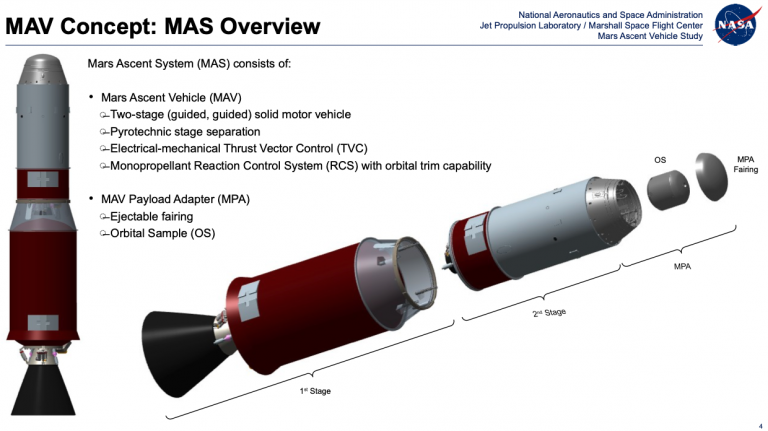
MAV exterior design

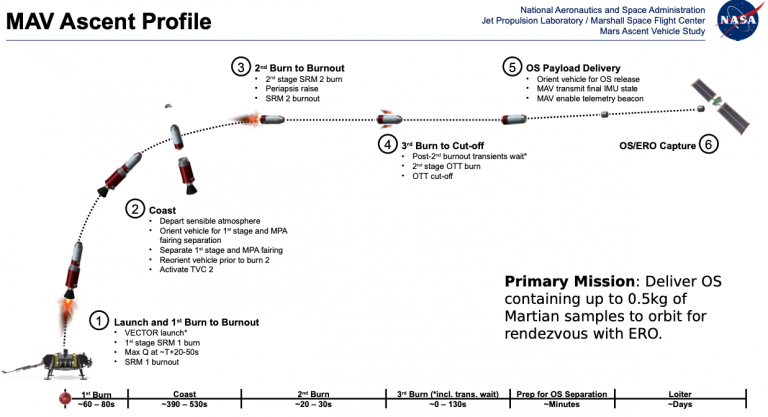
MAV flight plan

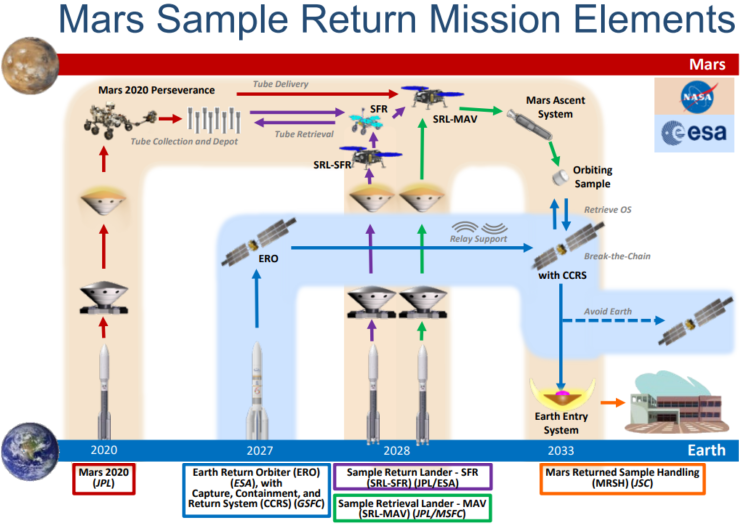
Mars Sample Return 2020–2033 Timeline

== Sample return ==
=== Earth Return Orbiter (ERO) ===
ESA's insignias for its contributions to the mission, the Earth Return orbiter (left) and Sample Transfer Arm (right).

ERO was a planned ESA-developed spacecraft. It would include the NASA-built Capture and Containment and Return System (CCRS) and Electra UHF Communications Package. It would rendezvous with the samples delivered by MAV in low Mars orbit (LMO). The ERO orbiter was planned to weigh ~7,000 kg (15,000 lb) (largest Mars Orbiter) and have solar arrays resulting in a wingspan of more than 38 m (125 ft). These solar panels would be some of the largest ever launched into space.

ERO was scheduled to launch on an Ariane 6 rocket in 2027 and arrive at Mars in 2029, using ion propulsion and a separate chemical propulsion element to gradually reach the proper orbit of 325 km (202 mi), and then rendezvous with the orbiting sample. The MAV's second-stage radio beacon would give controllers the information they need to get the ESA Earth Return Orbiter close enough to the Orbiting Sample to see it via reflective light, and capture it for return to earth. To do this, the ERO would use high-performance cameras to detect the Orbiting Sample at over 1,000 km (620 mi) distance. Once "locked on," the ERO would track it continuously using cameras and LiDARs throughout the rendezvous phase. Once aligned with the sample container, the Capture, Containment, and Return System would power on, open its capture lid, and turn on its capture sensors. ESA's orbiter would then push itself toward the sample container at about 1 to 2 inches (2.5 to 5 centimeters) per second to overtake and "swallow" it. After detecting that the sample container is safely inside, the CCRS would quickly close its lid. Thus, the orbiter would retrieve and seal the canisters in orbit, and use a NASA-built robotic arm to place the sealed container into an Earth-entry capsule.

The 600 kg (1,300 lb) CCRS would be responsible for thoroughly sterilizing the exterior of the Orbiting Sample, and double sealing it inside the Earth Entry System (EES), creating a secondary containment barrier to keep the samples safely isolated and intact for maximum scientific return. It would raise its orbit, jettison the propulsion element (including ~500 kg (1,100 lb) of CCRS hardware, which would be of no use after sterilizing samples), and return to Earth during the 2033 Mars-to-Earth transfer window. ERO would measure the total radiation dose received throughout the entire flight. Results would help monitor the health of the spacecraft and provide important information on how to protect human explorers in future trips to Mars.

After USA cancelled the sample return mission, ESA was considering repurposing ERO for a standalone one-way mission to Mars called ZefERO, possibly launching to Mars in 2032. However, in early 2026, ESA member states decided to cancel ERO and the agency begun discussions with ERO's prime contractor, Airbus Defence and Space, about reusing certain technologies developed for the mission.

=== Earth Entry System (EES) ===
OSIRIS-REx Sample Return Capsule in Utah (The EES will have a similar design with added structural hardening to withstand a non-parachuted landing)

The Capture/Containment and Return System (CCRS) would stow the sample in the EES. The EES would return to Earth and land passively, without a parachute. About a week before arrival at Earth, and only after successfully completing a full system safety check-out, the ERO spacecraft would be configured to perform the Earth return phase. When the orbiter is three days away from Earth, the EES will be released from the main spacecraft, and fly a precision entry trajectory to a predetermined landing site. Shortly after separation, the orbiter itself would perform a series of maneuvers to enter orbit around the Sun, never to return to Earth. The desert sand at the Utah Test and Training Range and shock absorbing materials in the vehicle are planned to protect the samples from impact forces. The EEV is scheduled to land on Earth in 2033.

Artist's concept of Mars sample return orbiter

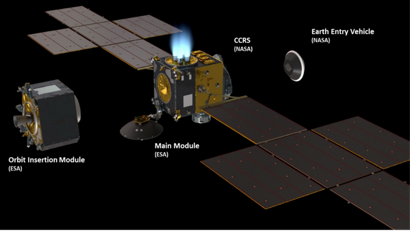
Cross section of the Earth return orbiter

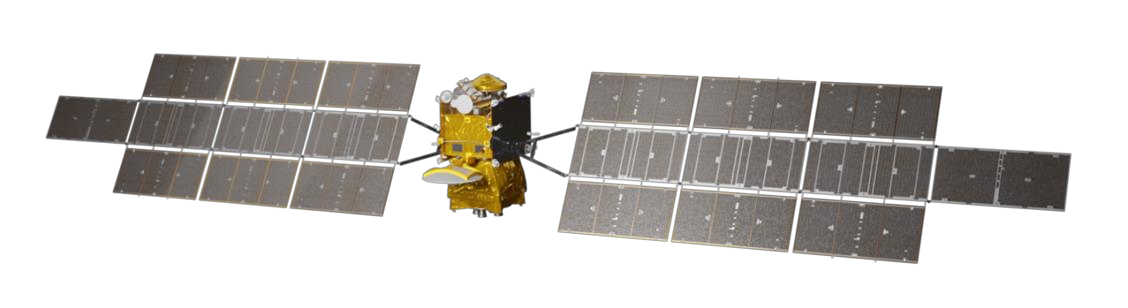
Earth Return Orbiter

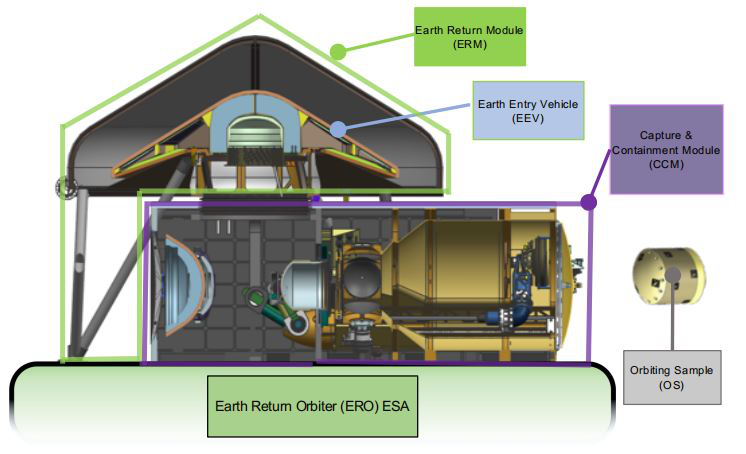
Capture and containment system

== Gallery ==
Potential sample-return landing site (14 April 2022)

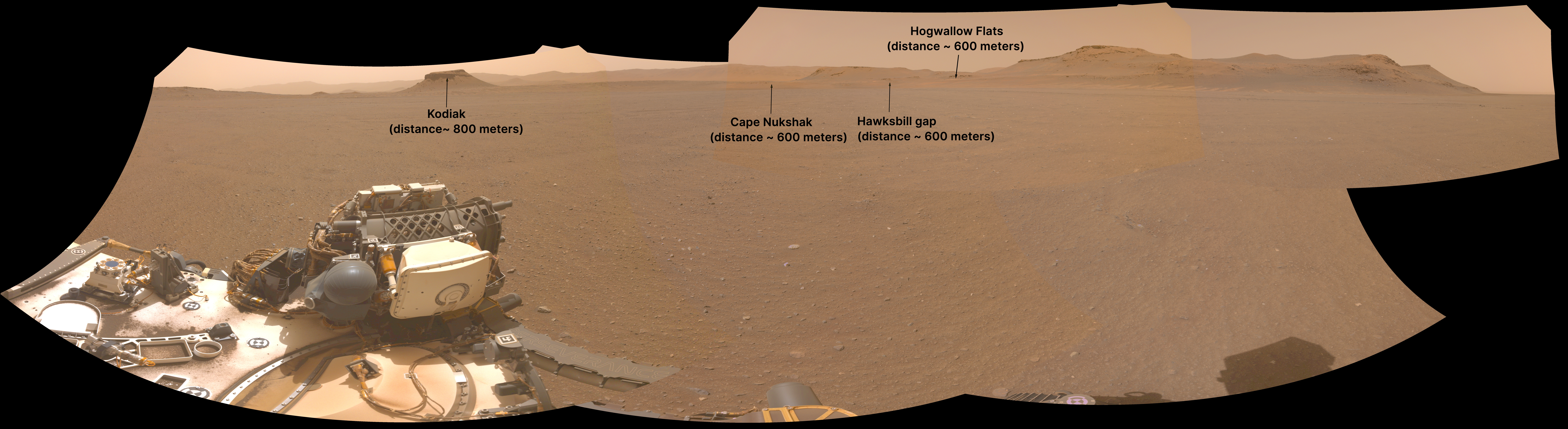

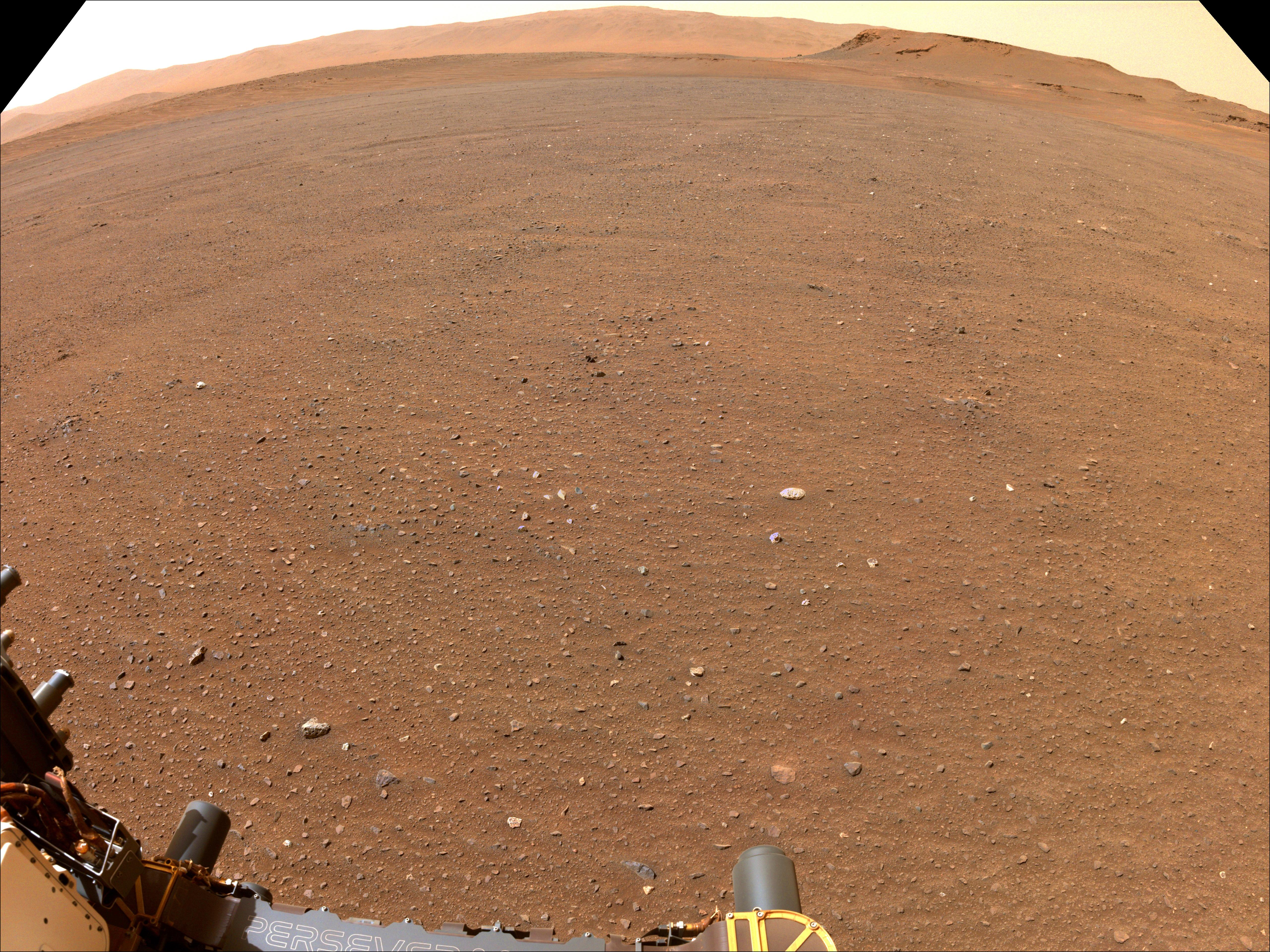
Mars sample-return mission – Sampling Process

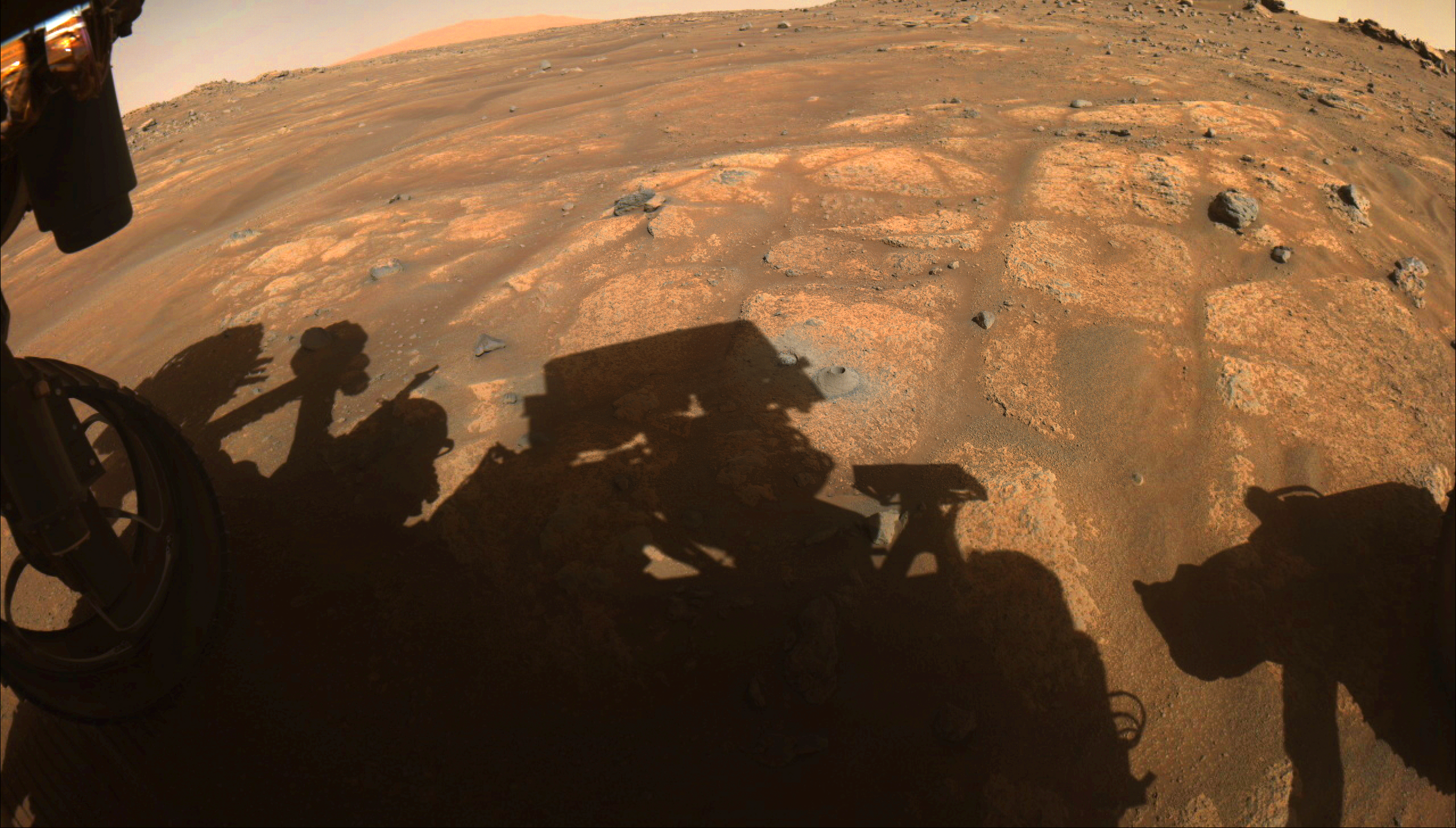
Context

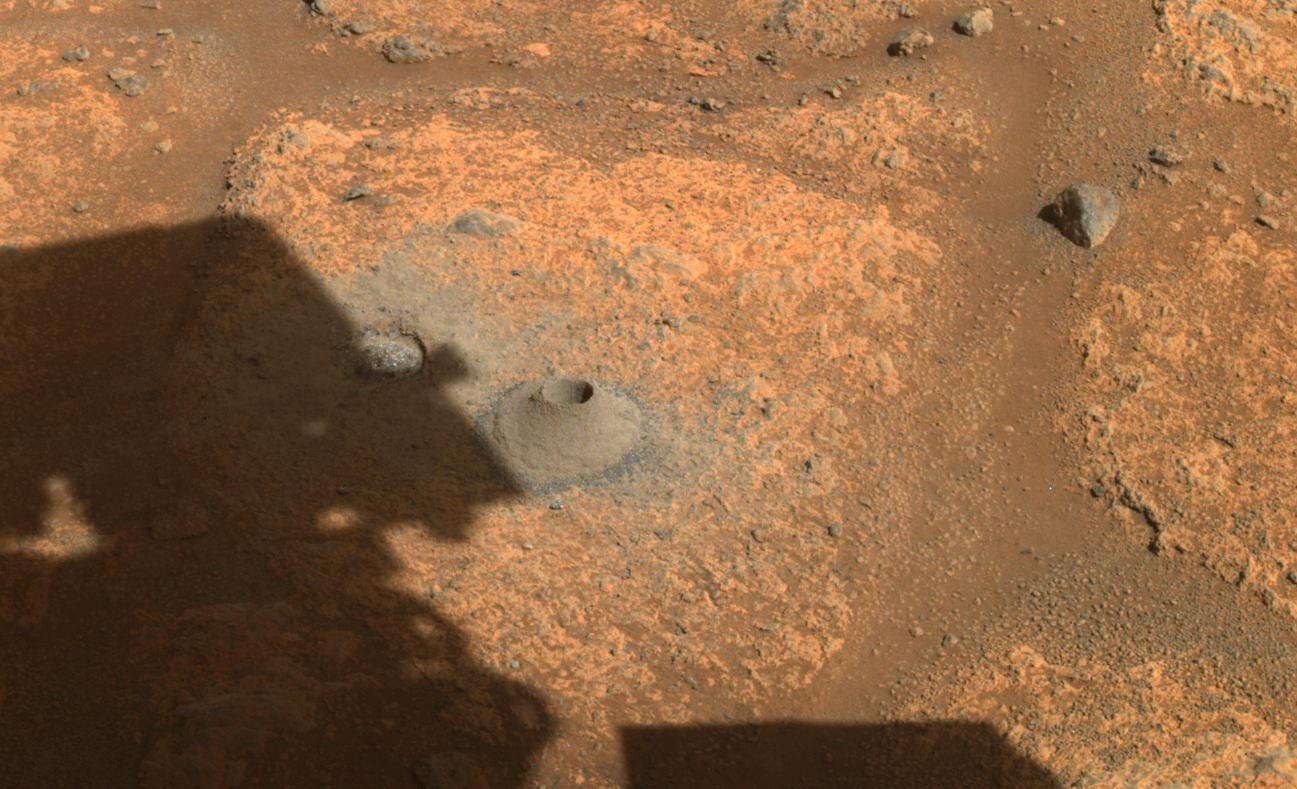
MidView

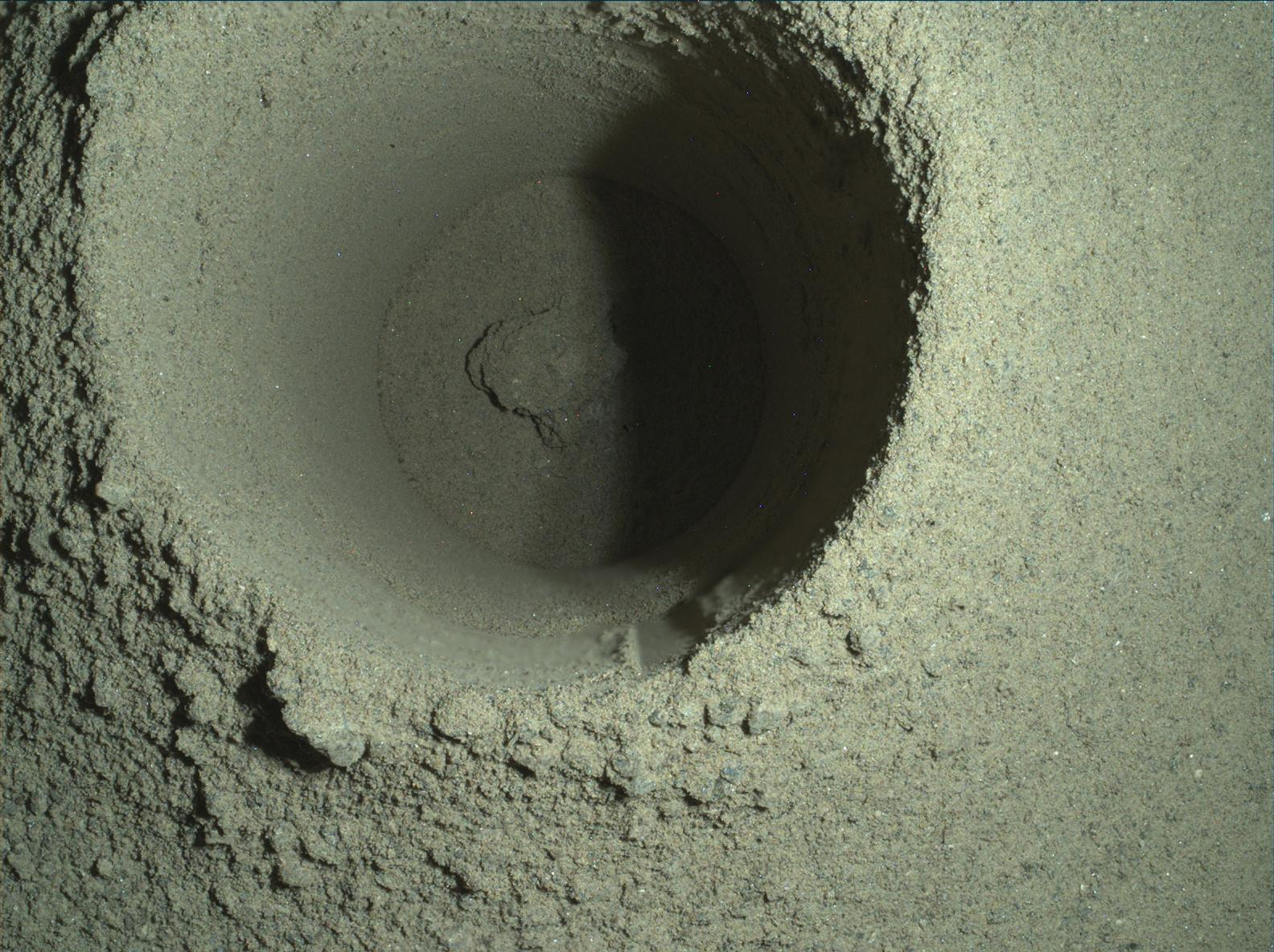
CloseUp

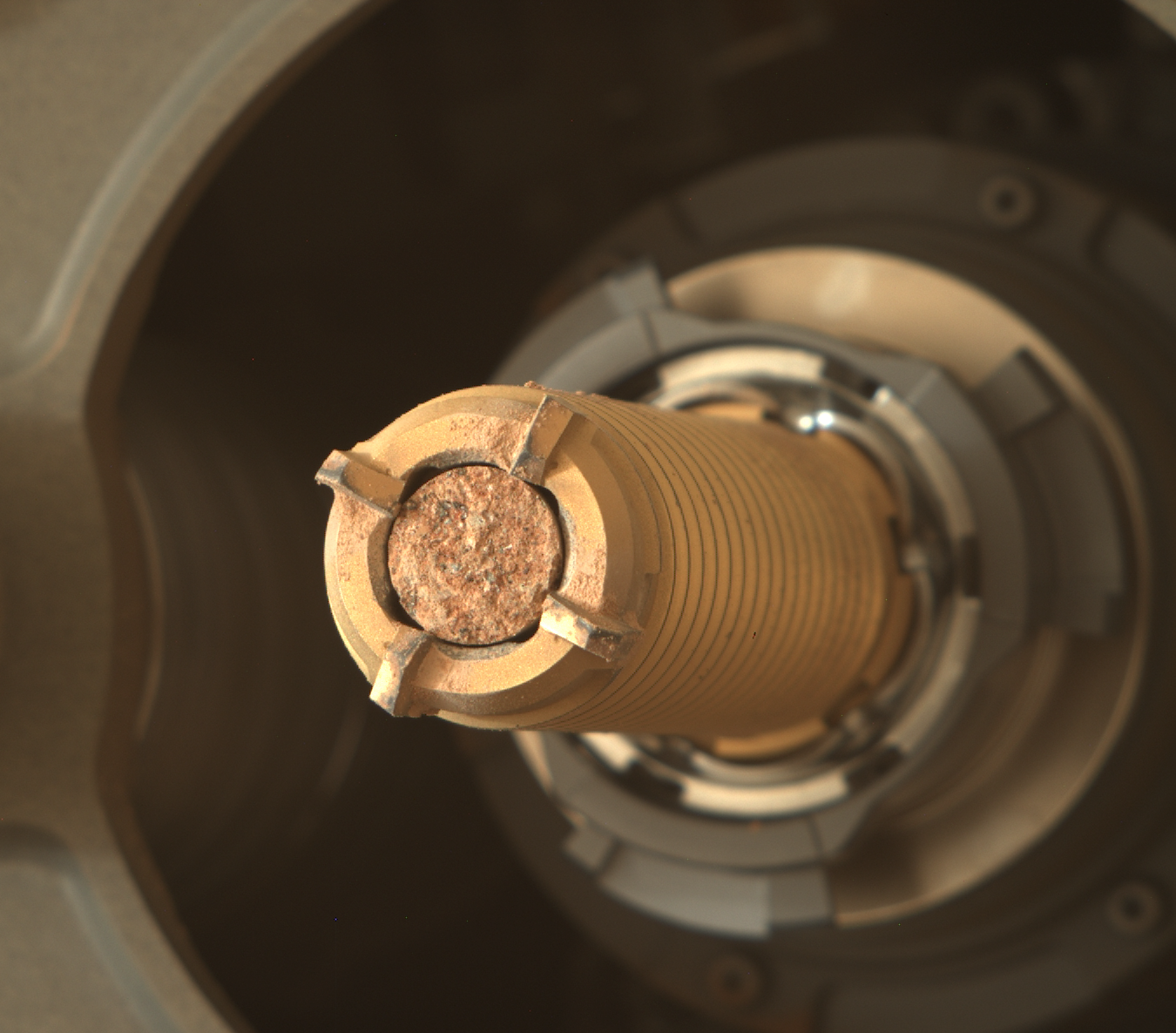
Sample in drill

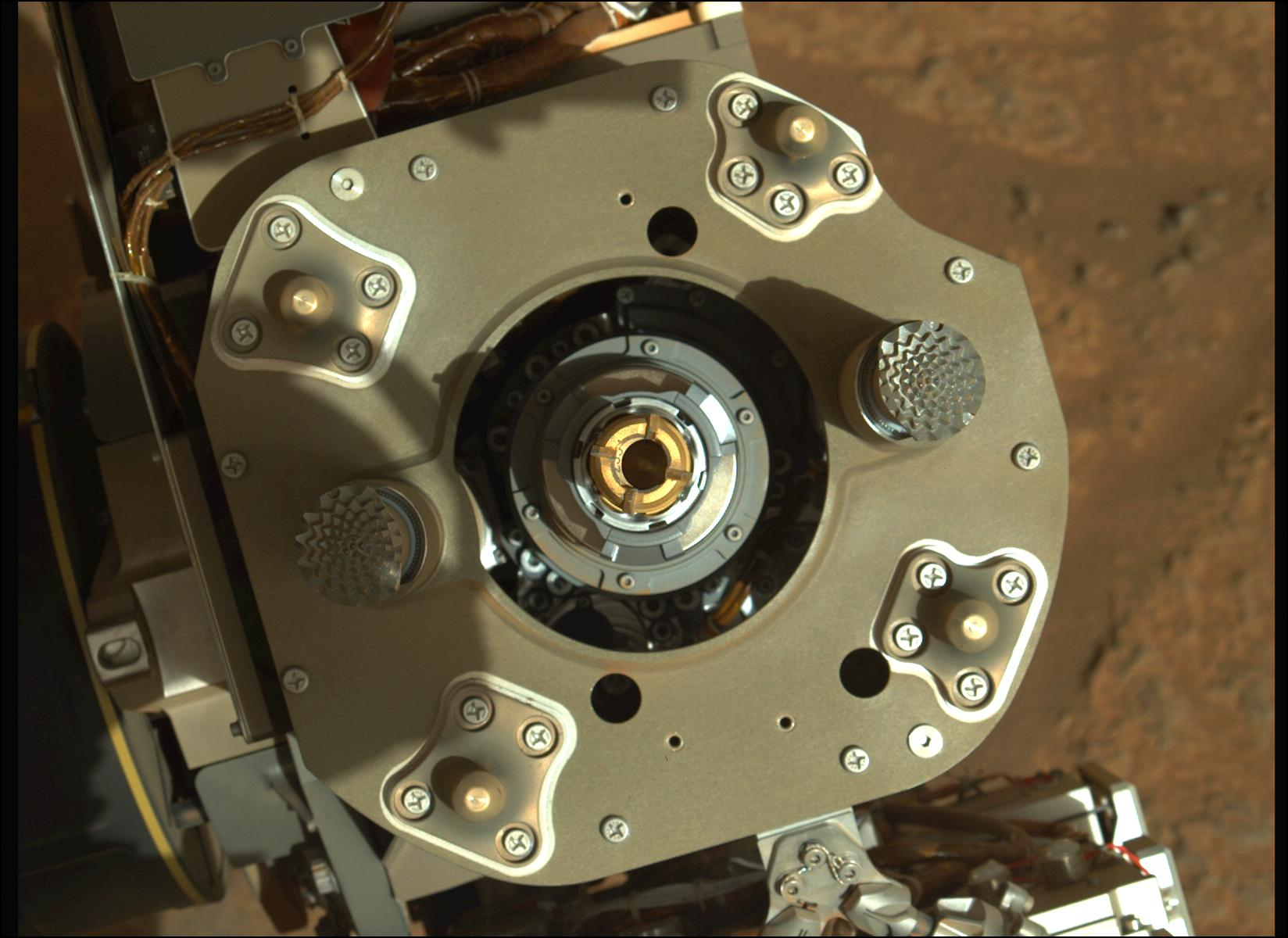
Sampling drill

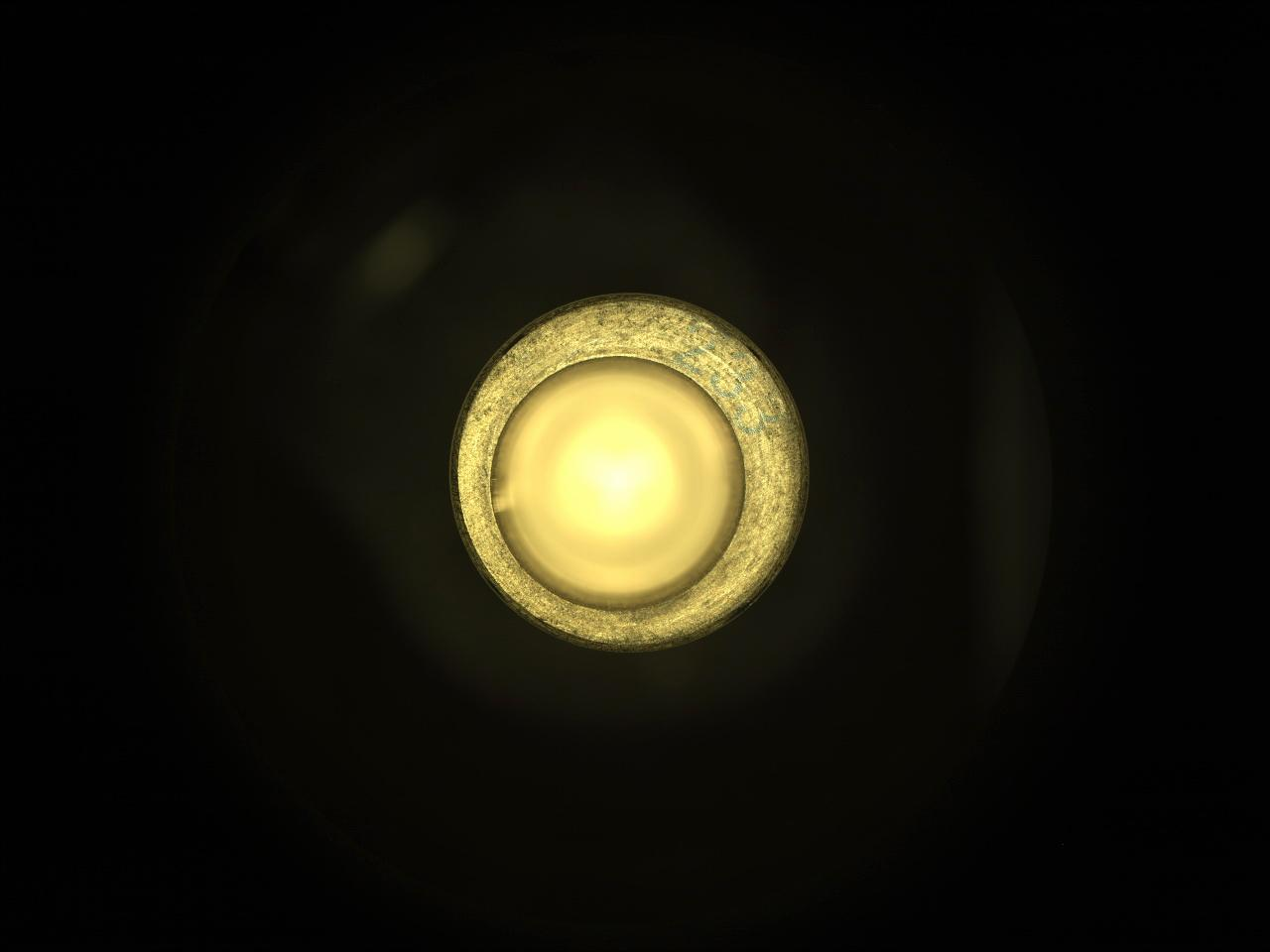
Sample Tube 233

Mars sample-return mission – Sample Tubes

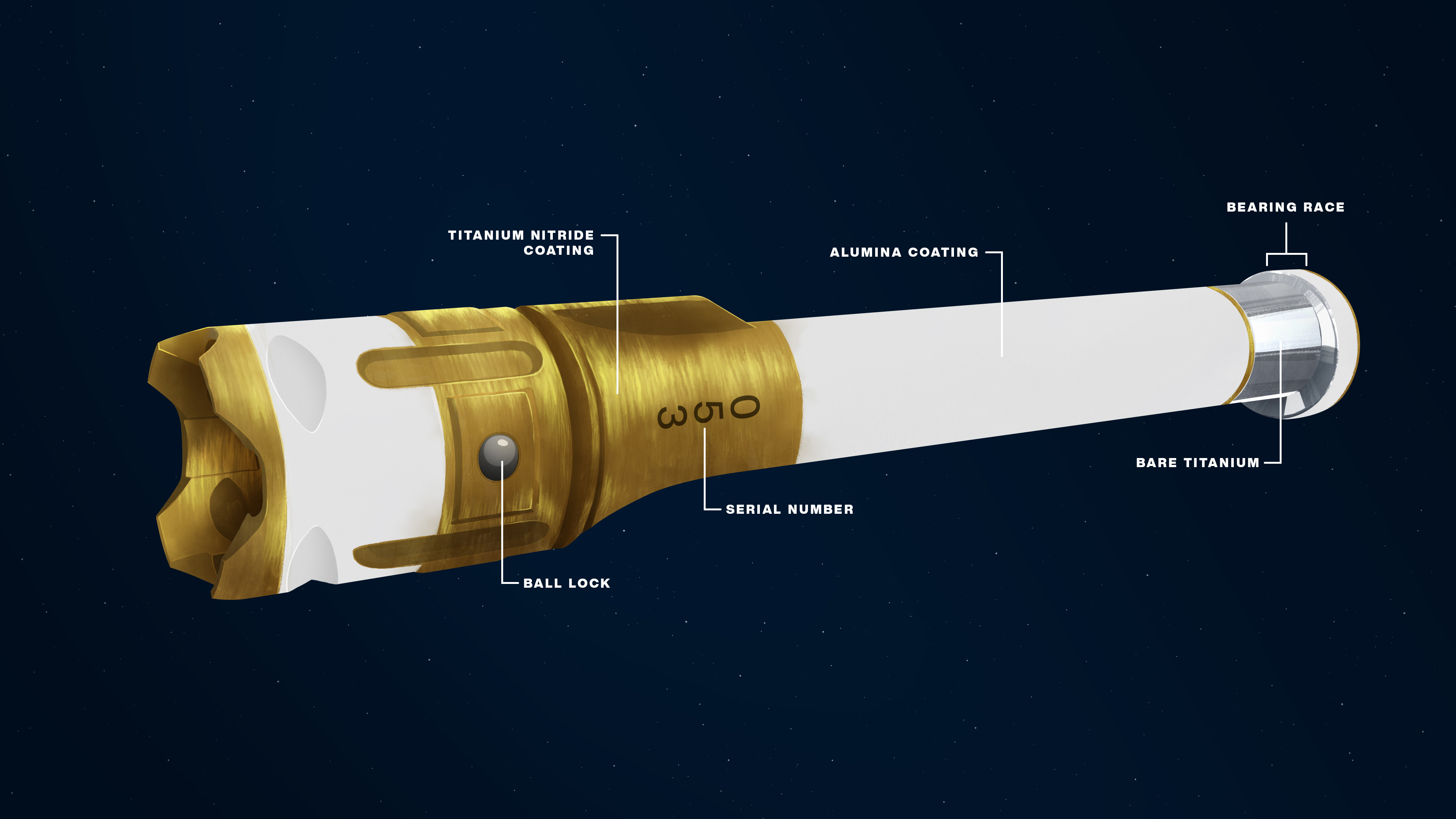
Exterior

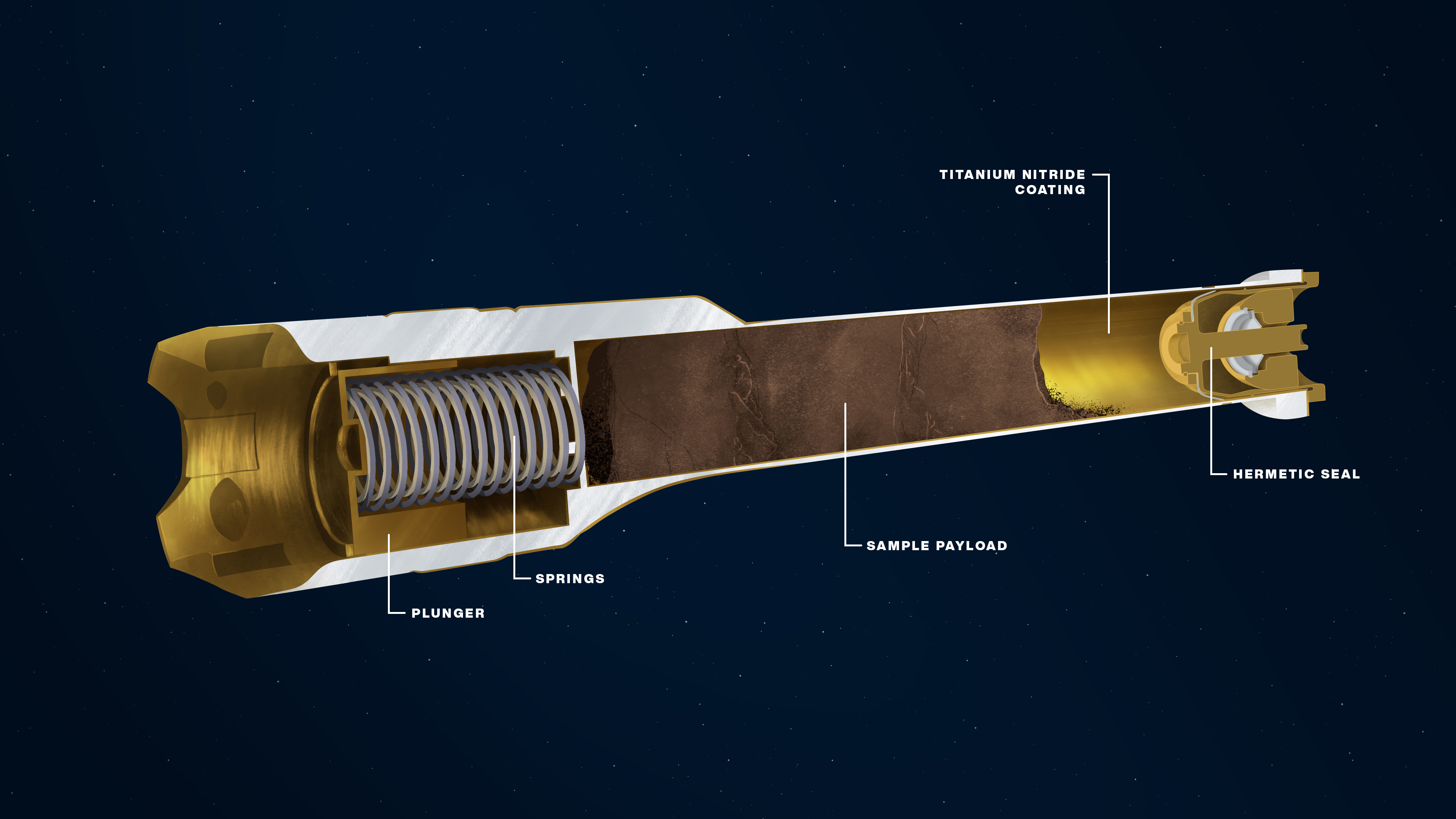
Interior

CT Scan (animation)

Witness Sample Tube

Mars sample-return mission

Perseverance rover – Sample collection and storage
(animated video; 02:22; February 6, 2020)

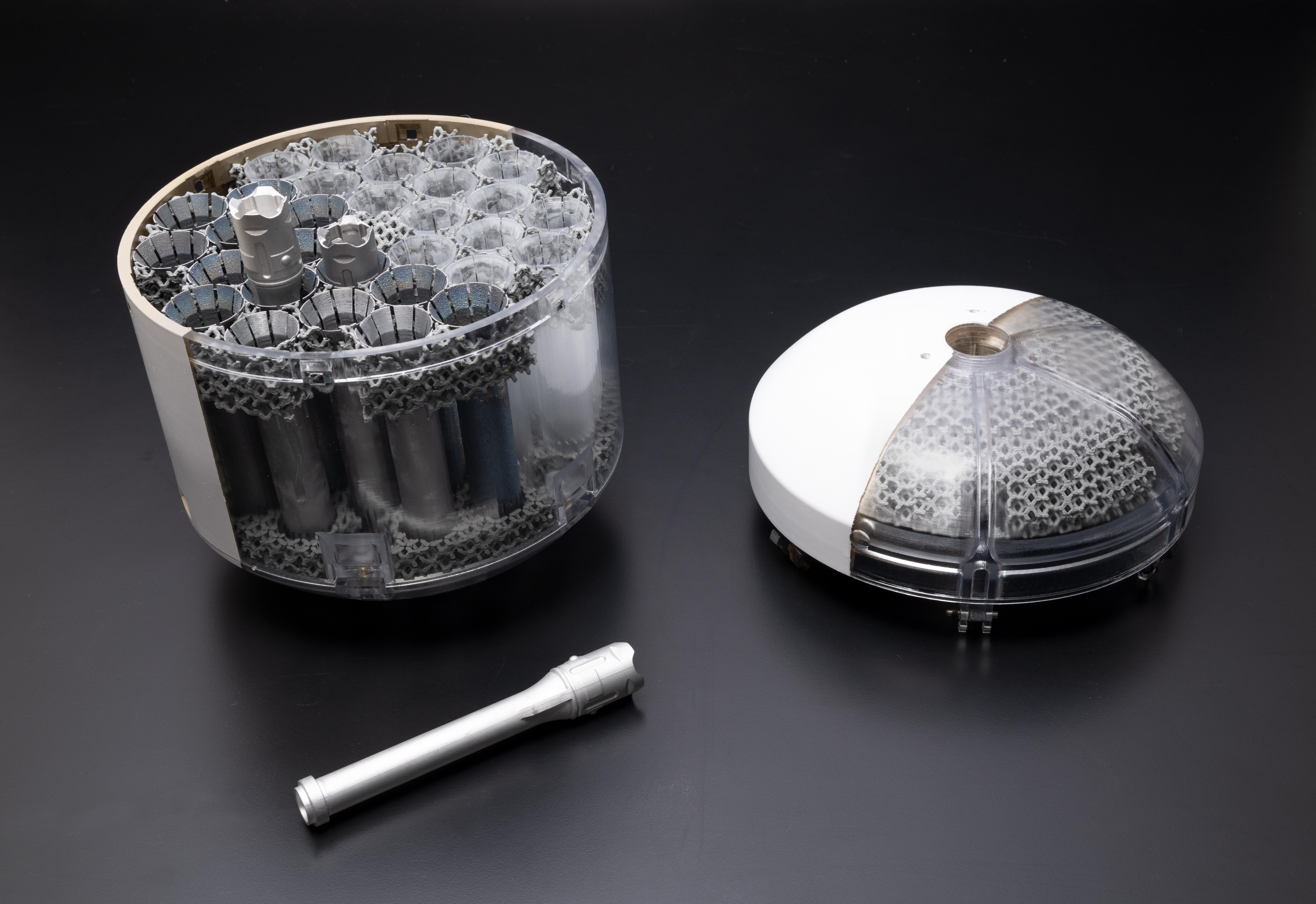
Orbiting sample container (concept; 2020)

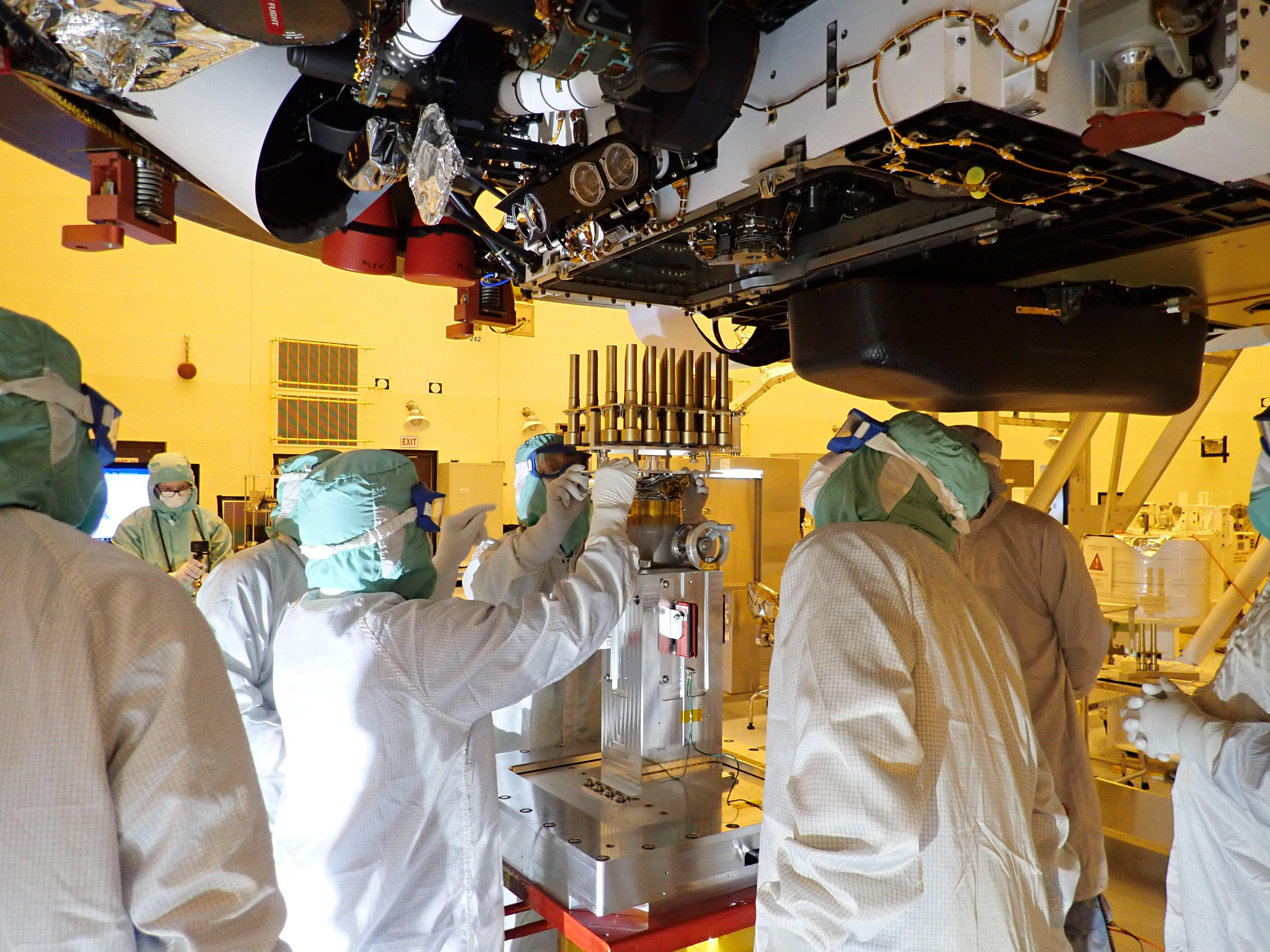
Inserting sample tubes into the rover

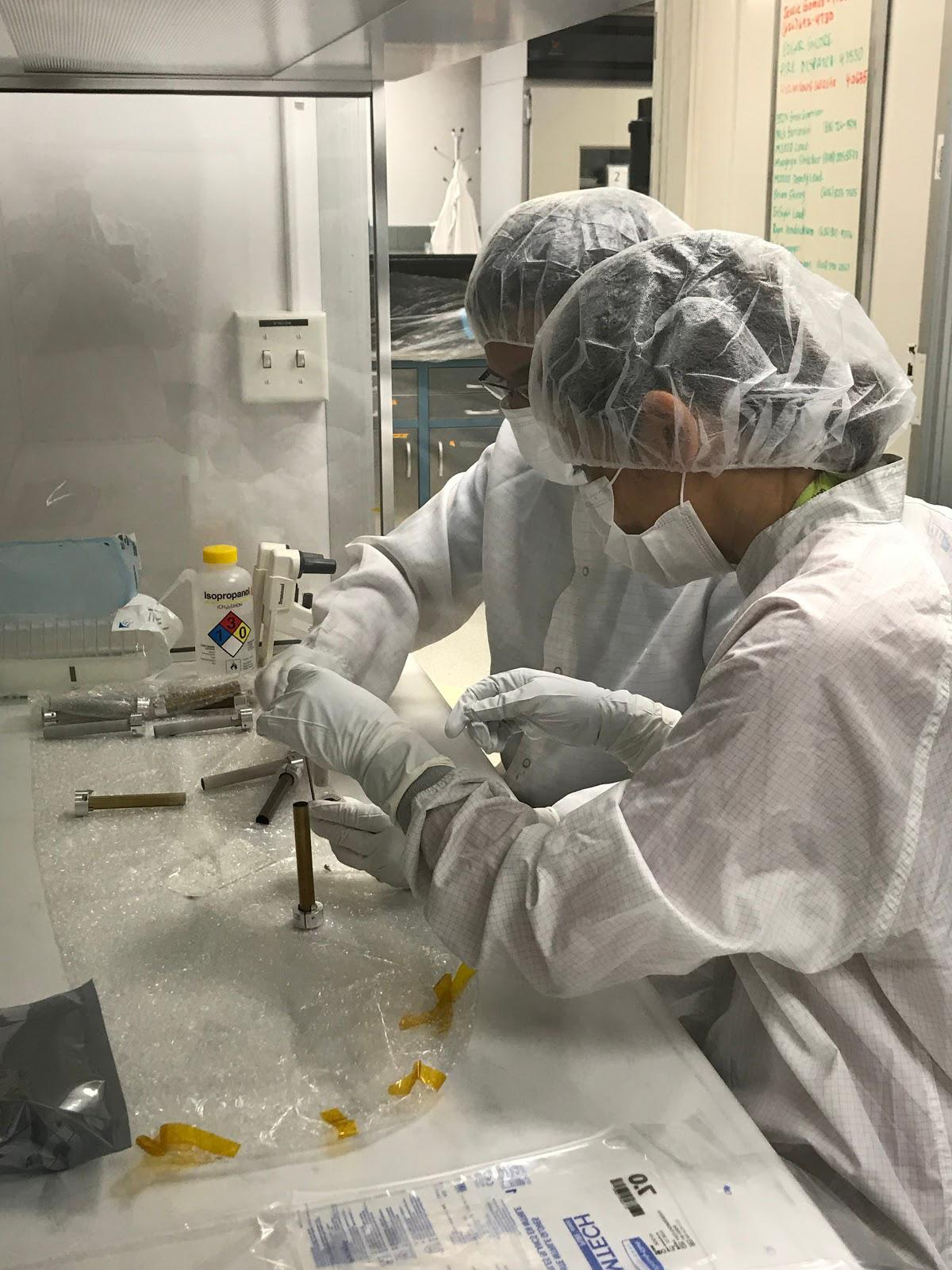
Cleaning sample tubes

Mars sample-return mission (2020; artist's impression)

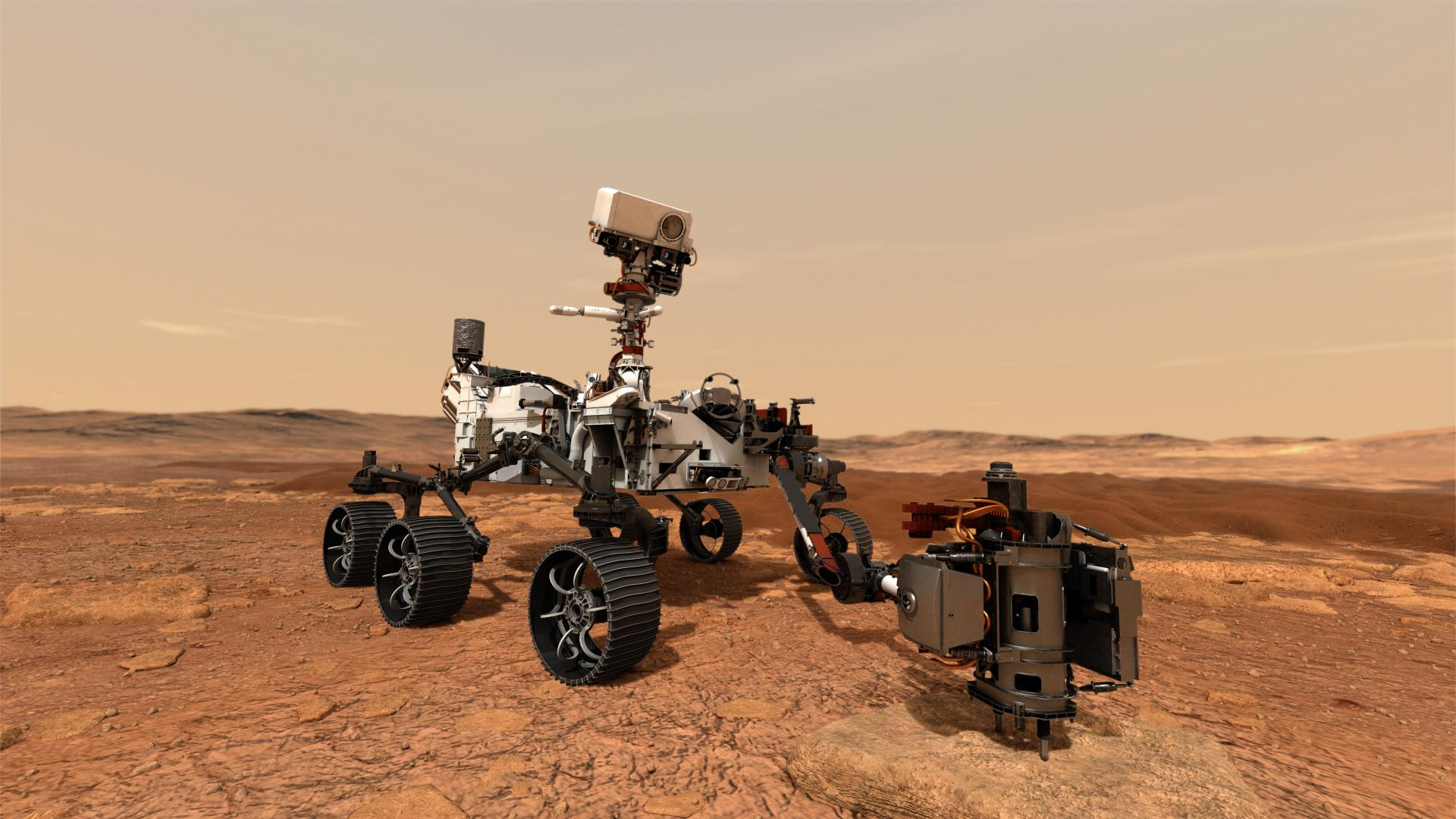
01. Perseverance rover obtaining samples

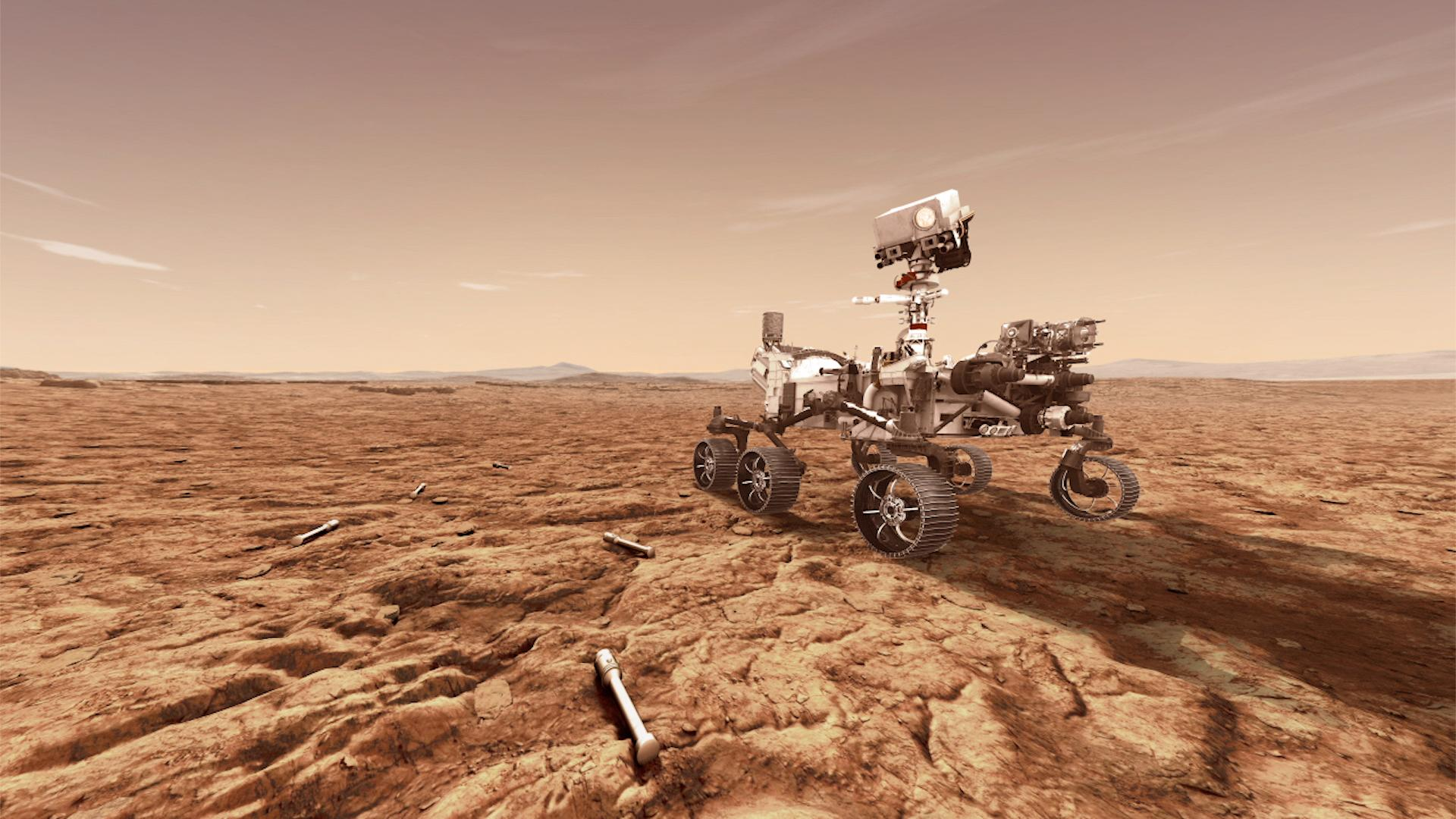
02. Perseverance rover storing samples

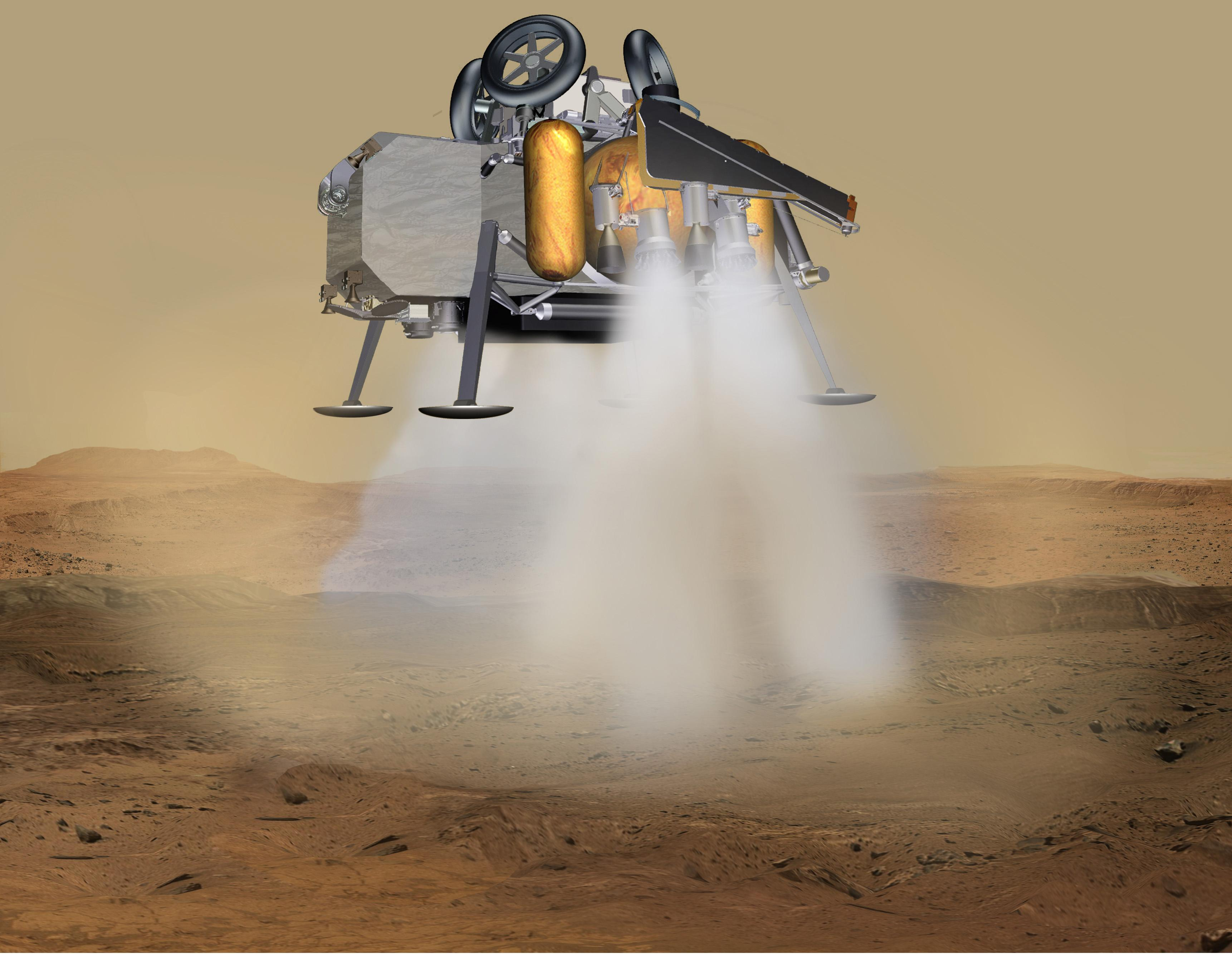
03. SRL 1 landing pattern

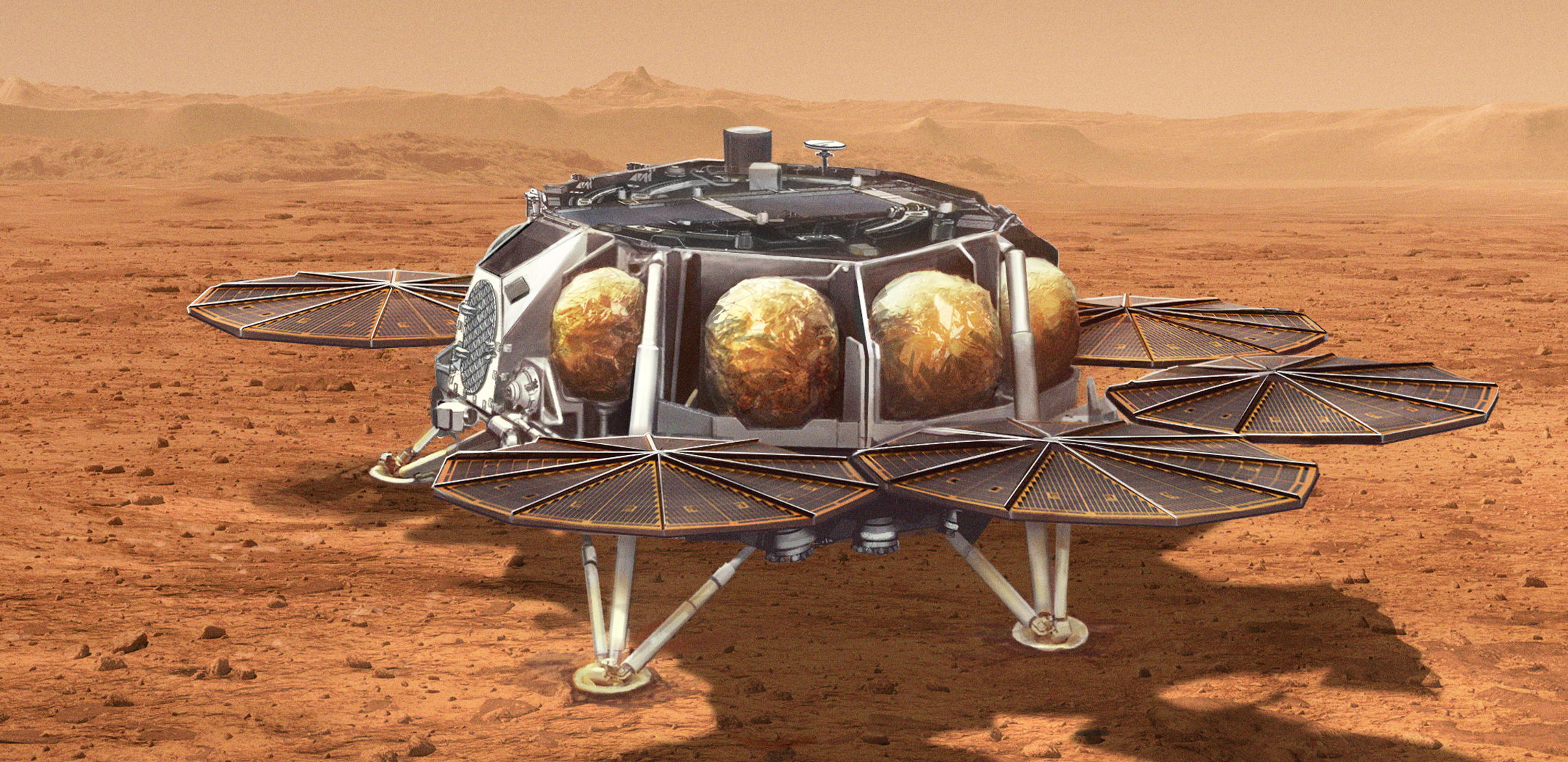
04. SRL unfolded

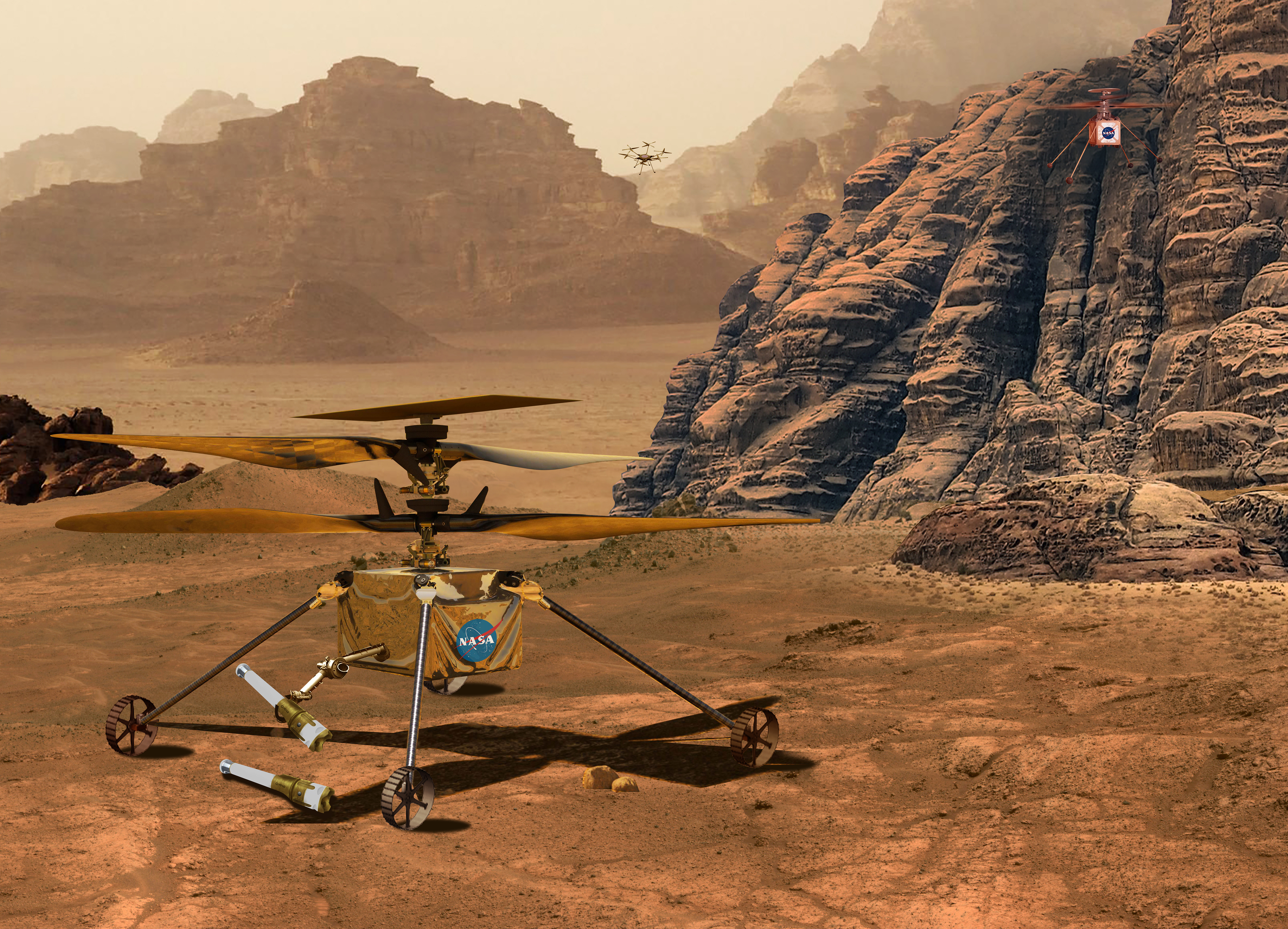
05. Mars Samples return helicopters deployed by SRL and fetching samples as a backup

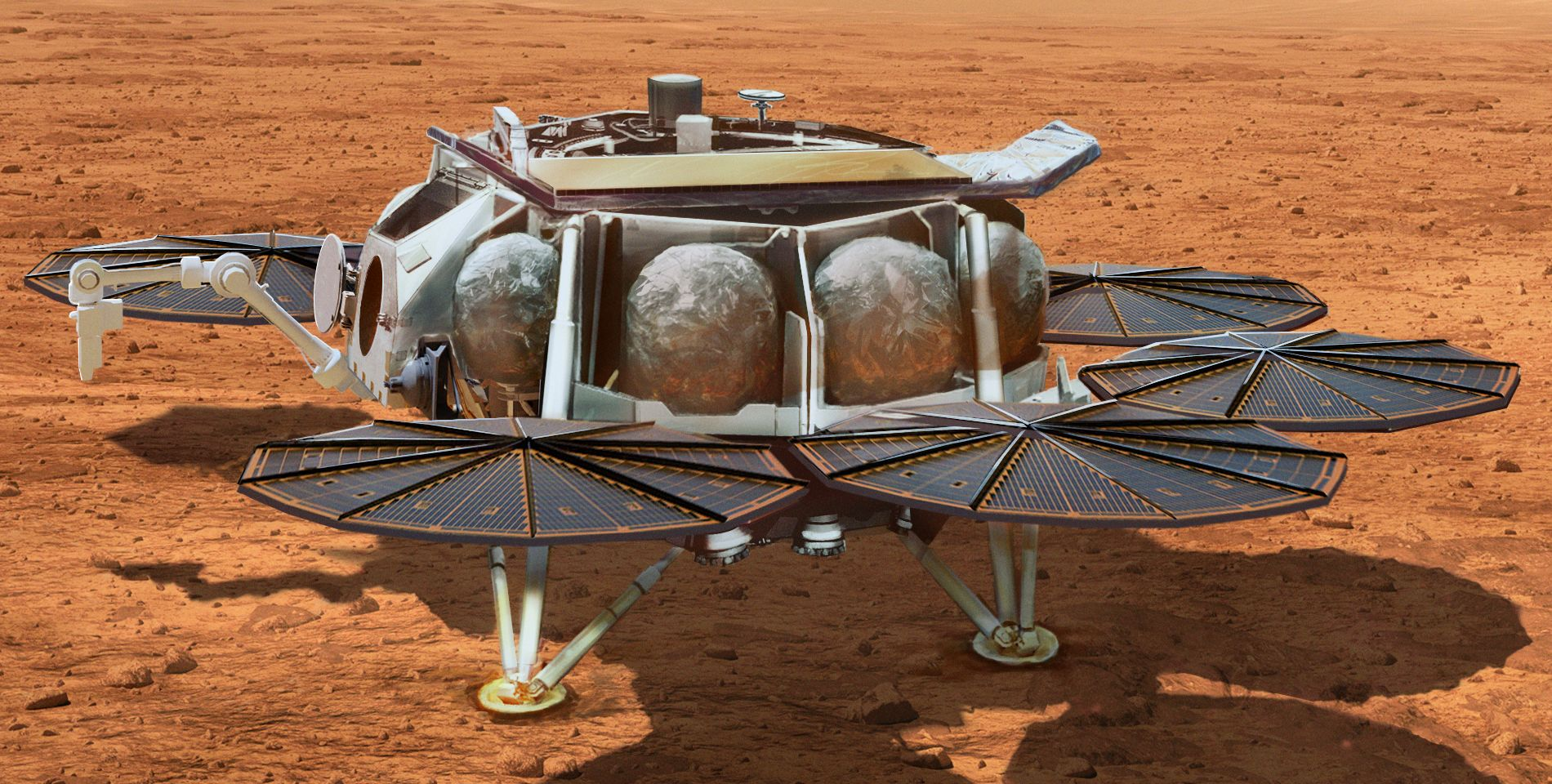
06. SRL picking up samples and loading them on MAV for launch

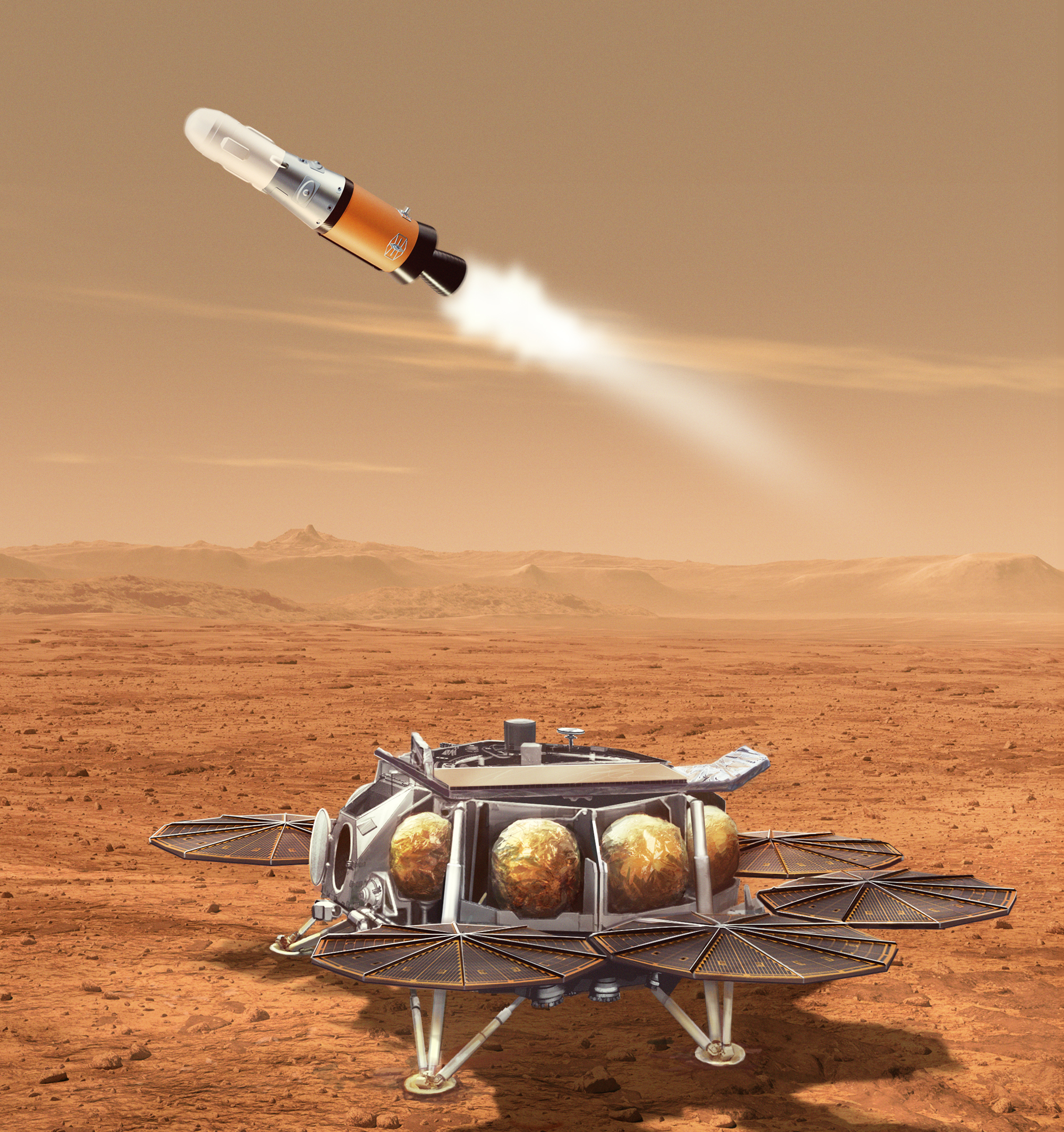
07. Launching from Mars to low Martian Orbit

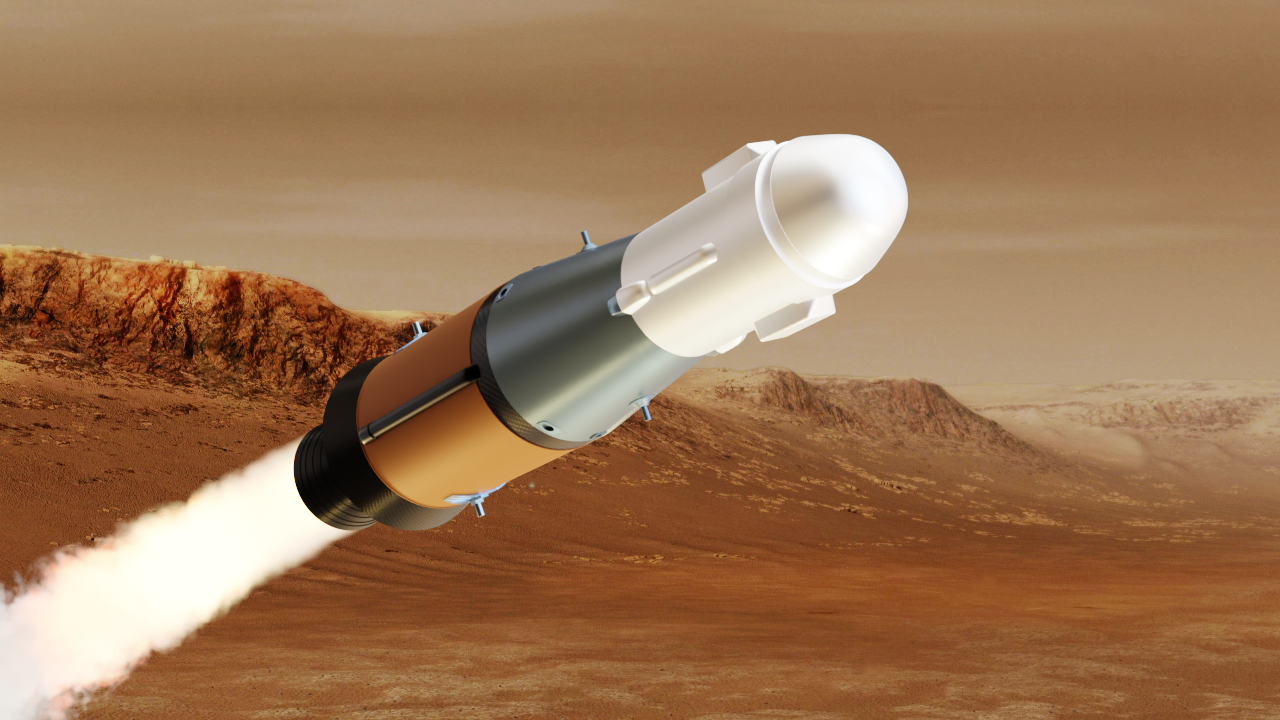
08. MAV in powered flight after release from vector

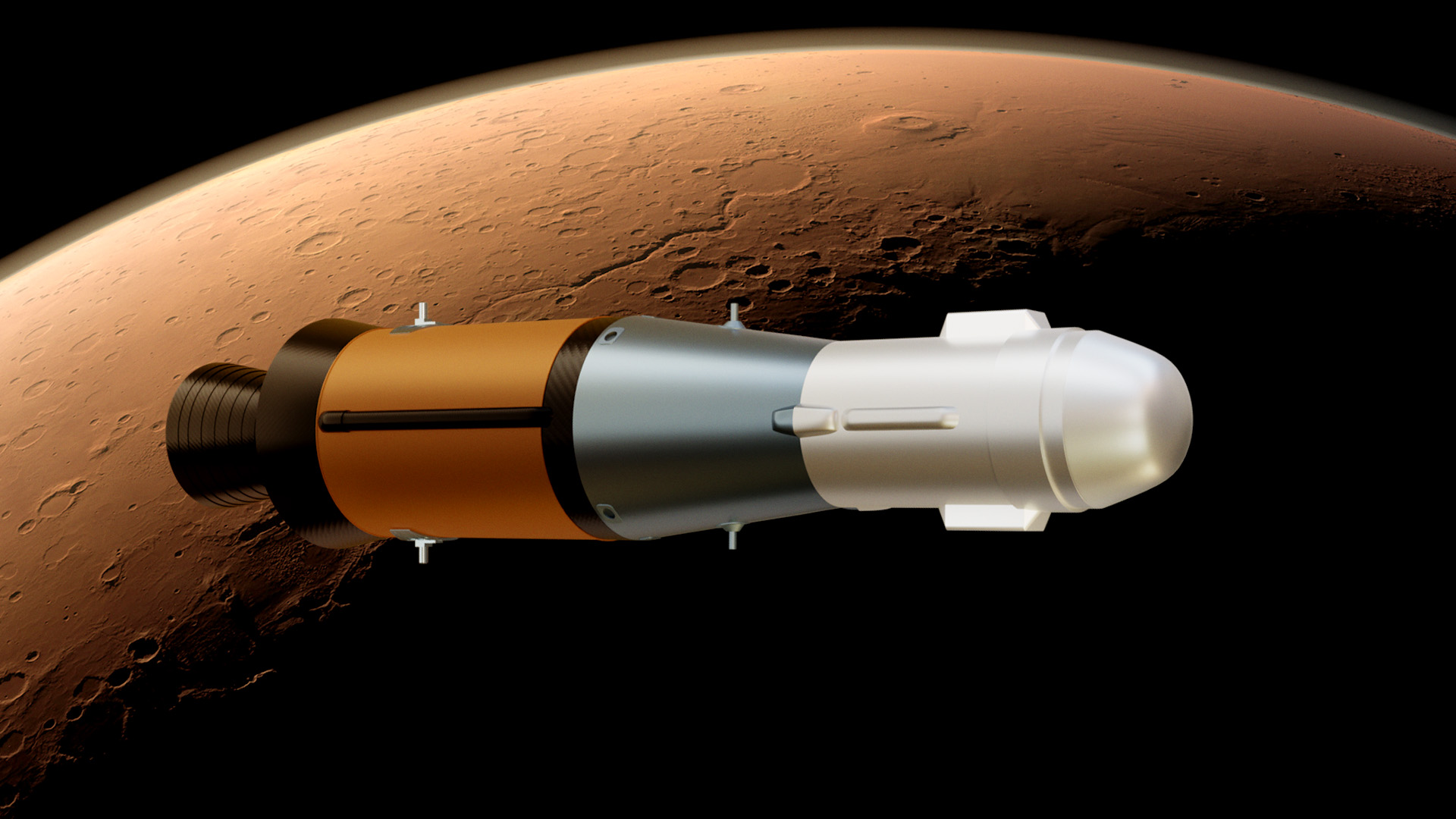
09. MAV in coast phase in Low Mars orbit after Main engine cutoff awaiting stage separation and second engine startup

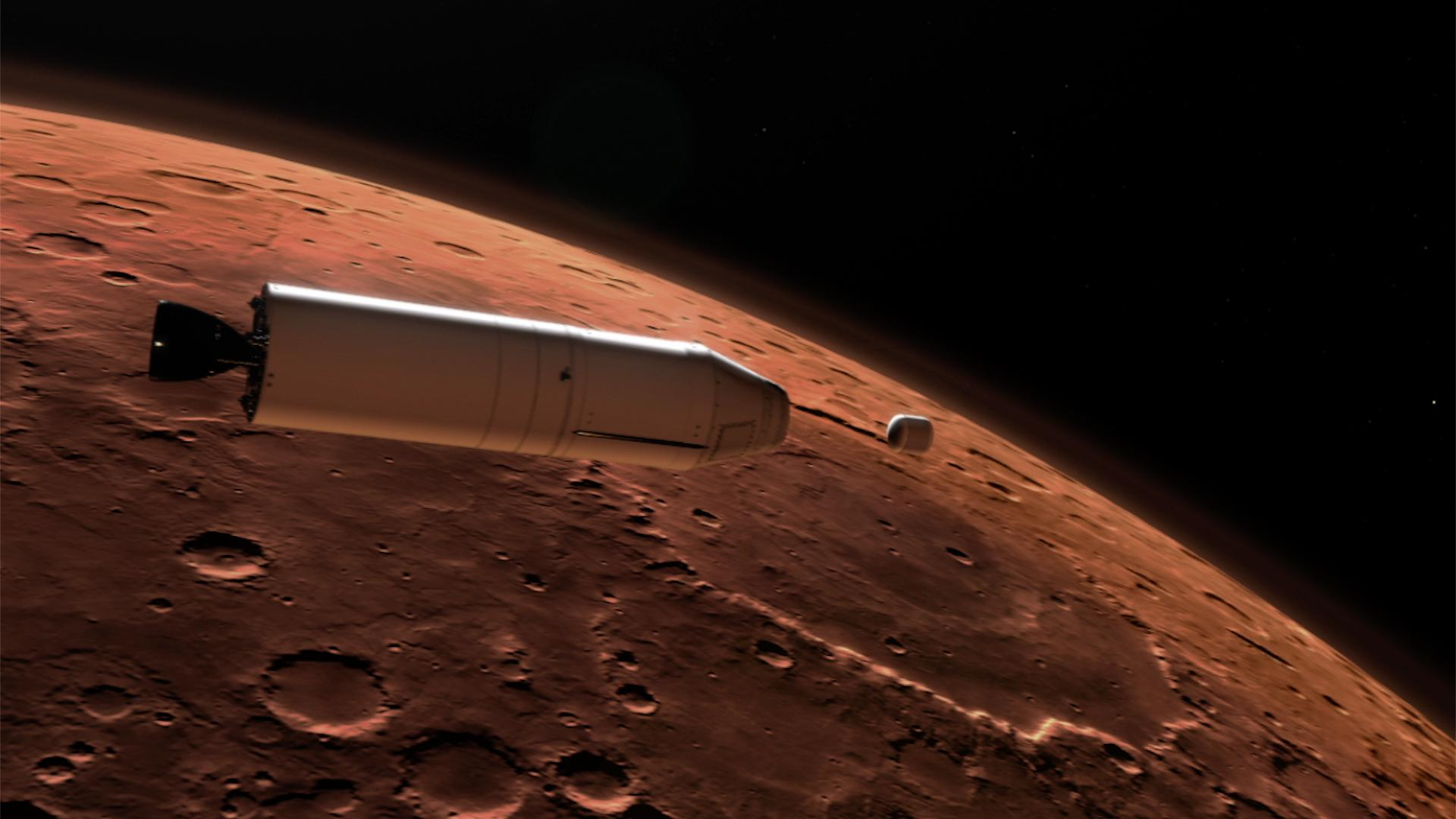
10. Payload Separation thereby Releasing samples for later pickup by the Earth Return Orbiter

== See also ==
- Timeline of Solar System exploration
- List of European Space Agency programmes and missions
