= List of NASA missions =

List of space missions by NASA

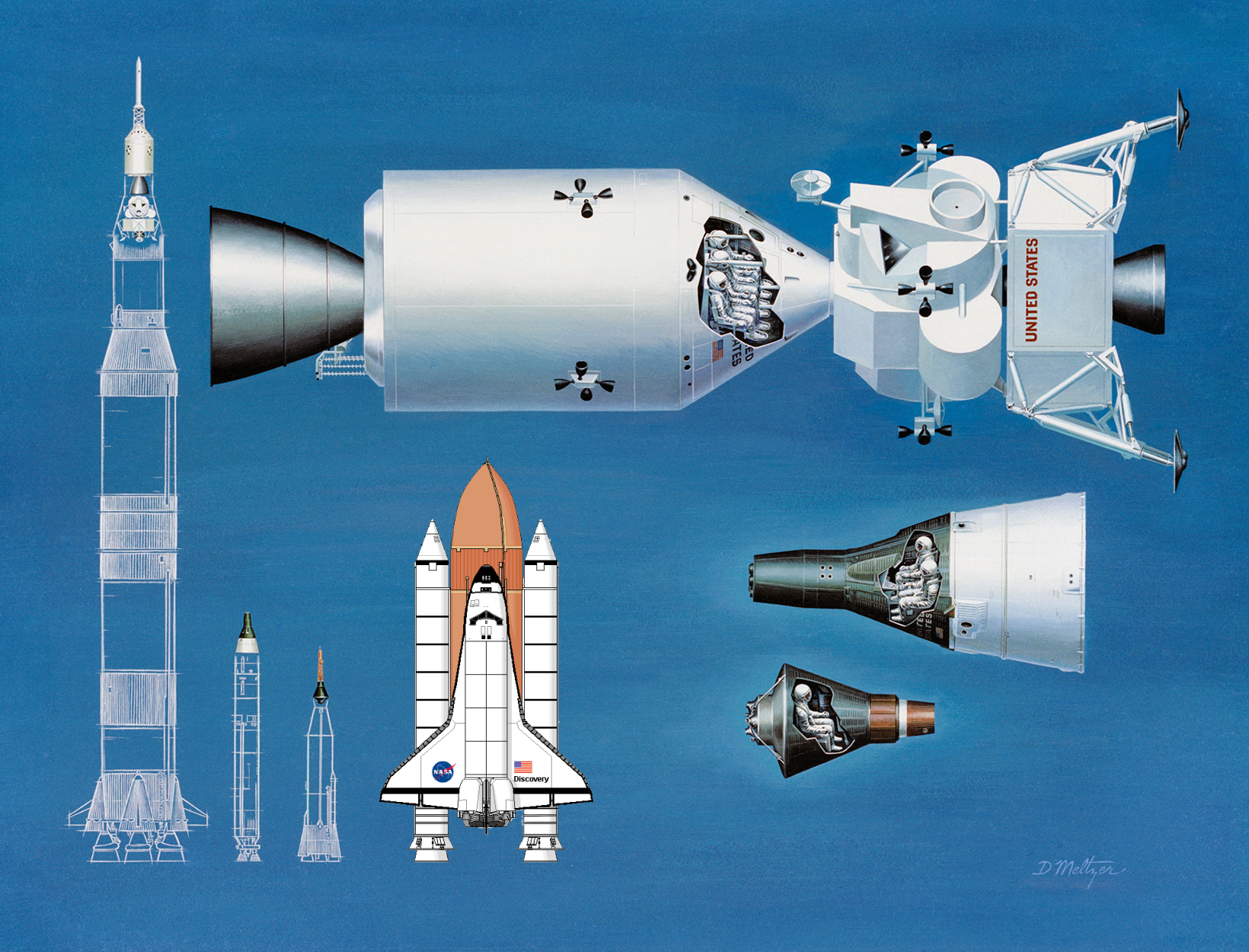
Comparison of NASA Mercury, Gemini, Apollo, and Space Shuttle spacecraft with their launch vehicles

This is a list of NASA missions, both crewed and robotic, since the establishment of NASA in 1958. There are over 80 currently active science missions.

== X-Plane program ==
Since 1945, NACA (NASA's predecessor) and, since January 26, 1958, NASA has conducted the X-Plane Program. The program was originally intended to create a family of experimental aircraft not intended for production beyond the limited number of each design built solely for flight research. The first X-Plane, the Bell X-1, was the first rocket-powered airplane to break the sound barrier on October 14, 1947. X-Planes have set numerous milestones since then, both crewed and unpiloted.

== Human spaceflight ==
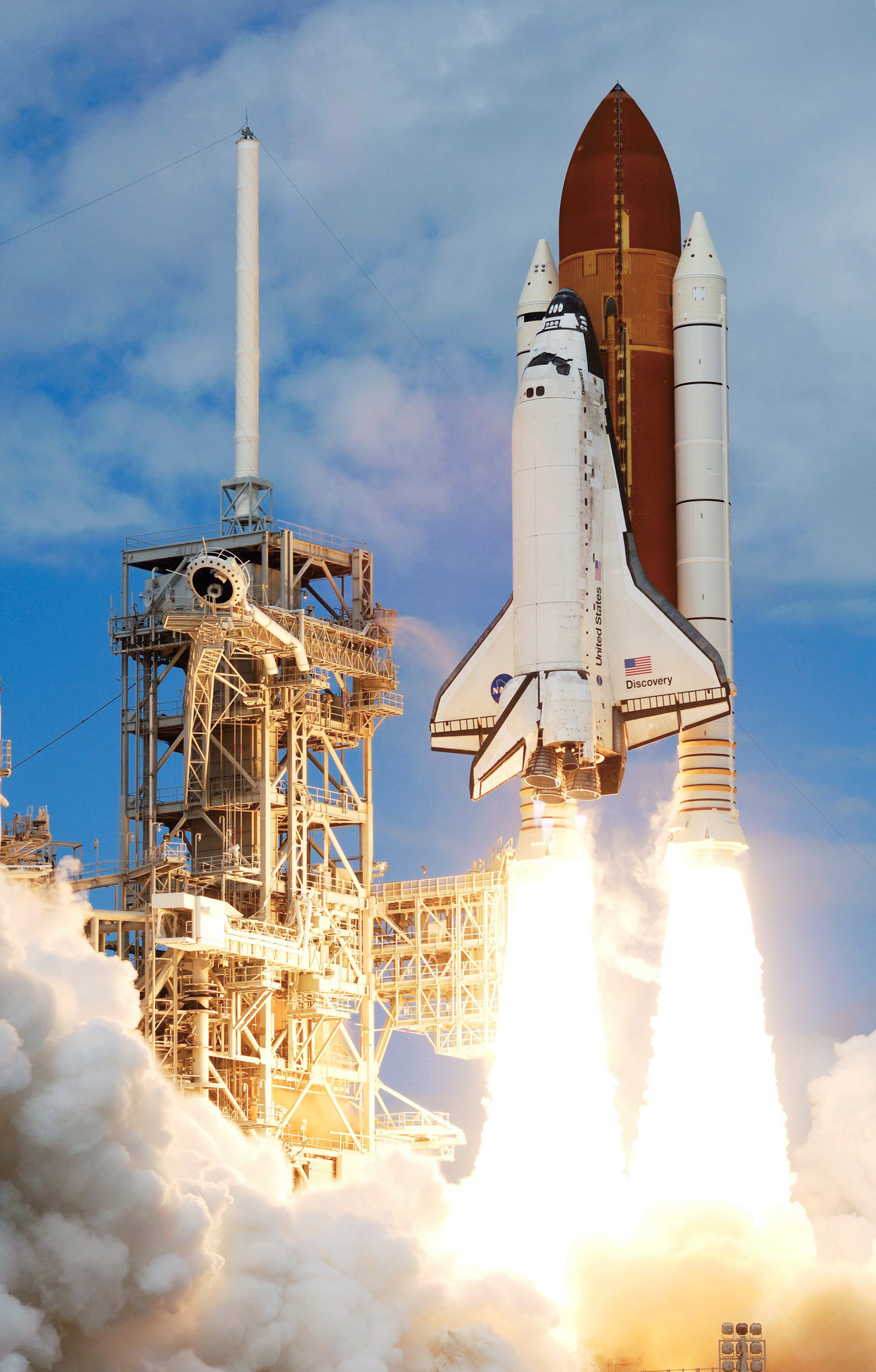
Discovery STS-120 launch, October 23, 2007

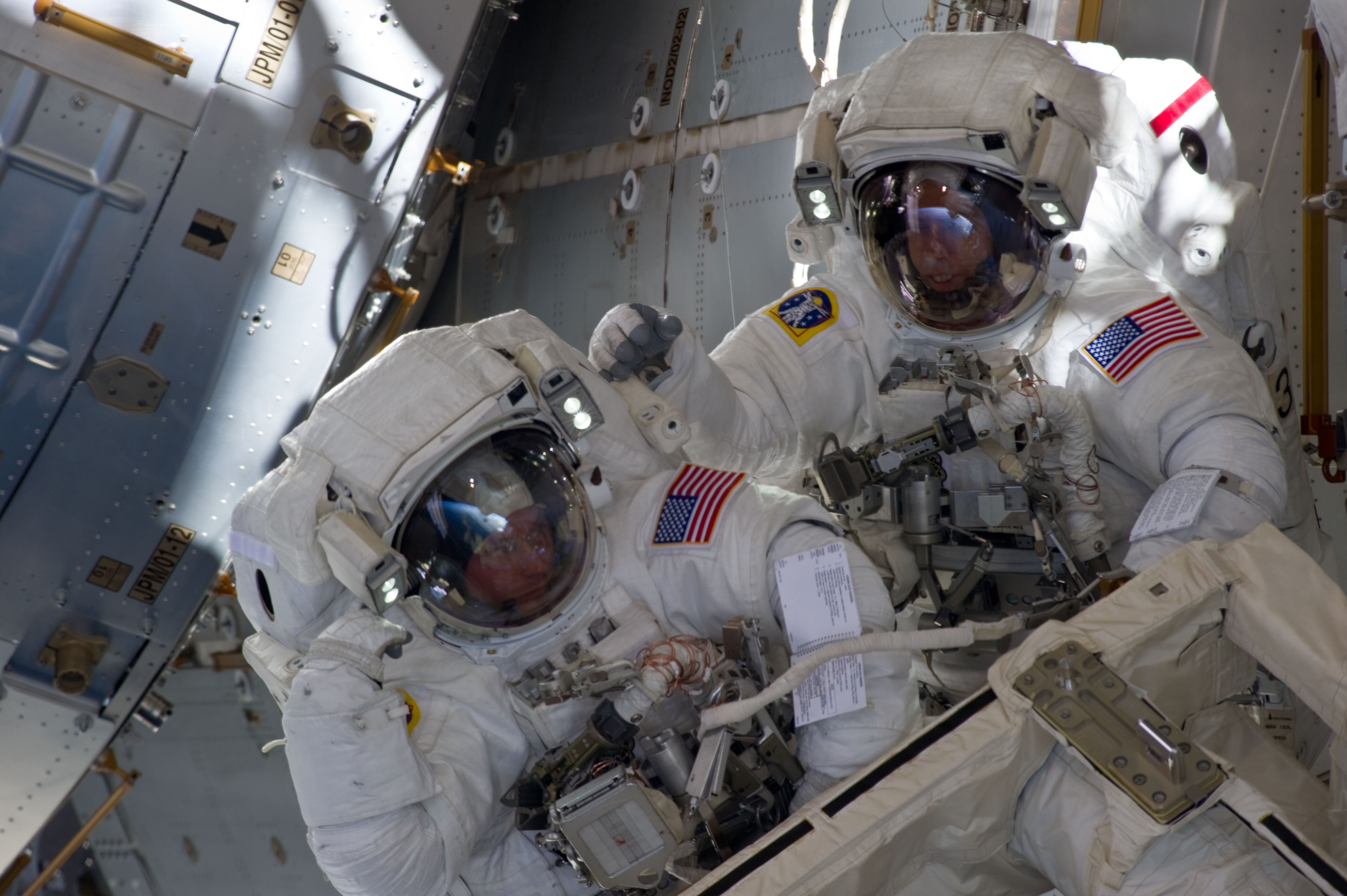
Astronauts Andrew Feustel (right) and Michael Fincke, outside the ISS during the STS-134 mission's third spacewalk.

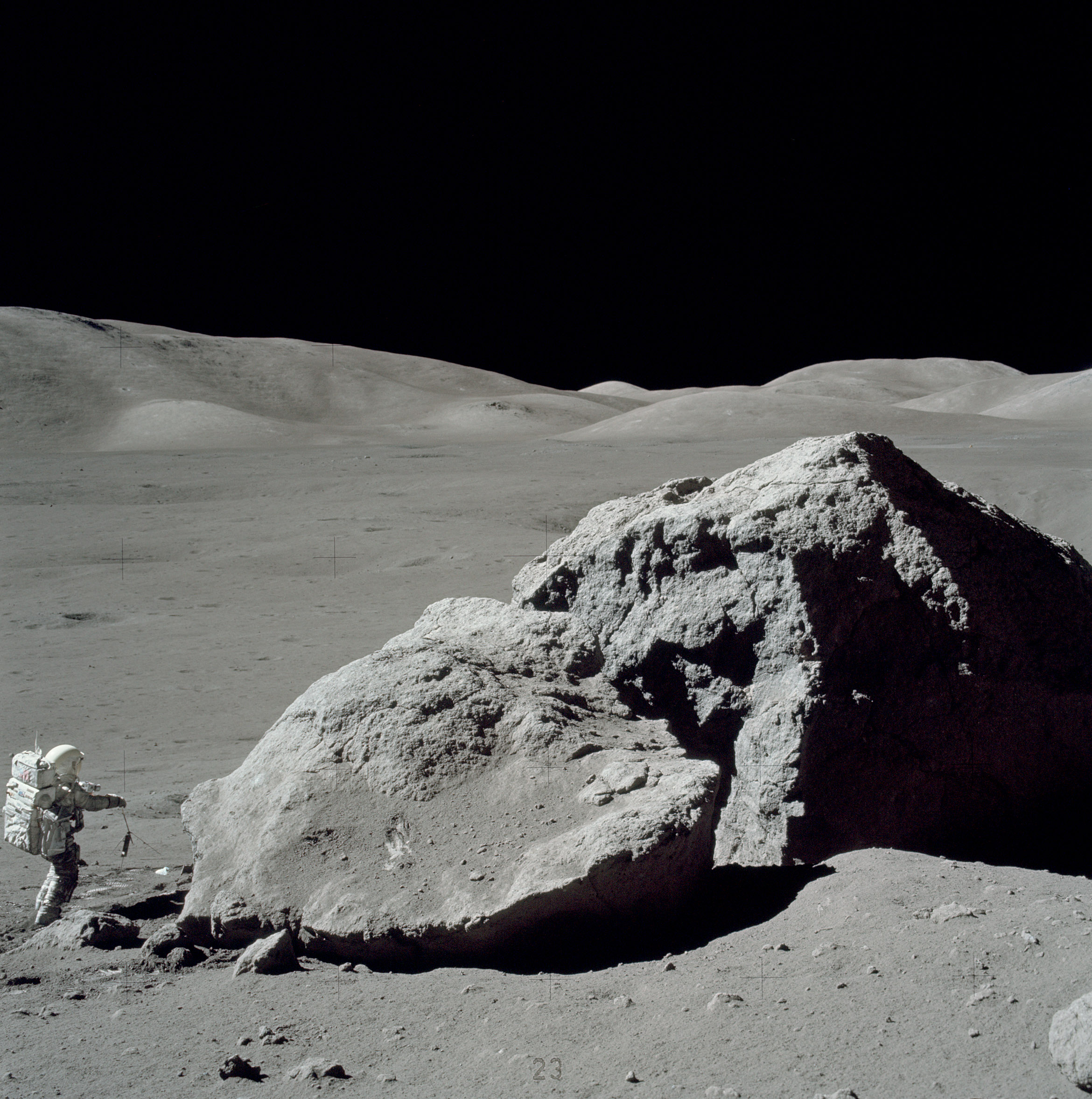
Apollo 17 astronaut Harrison Schmitt standing next to a boulder at Taurus-Littrow.

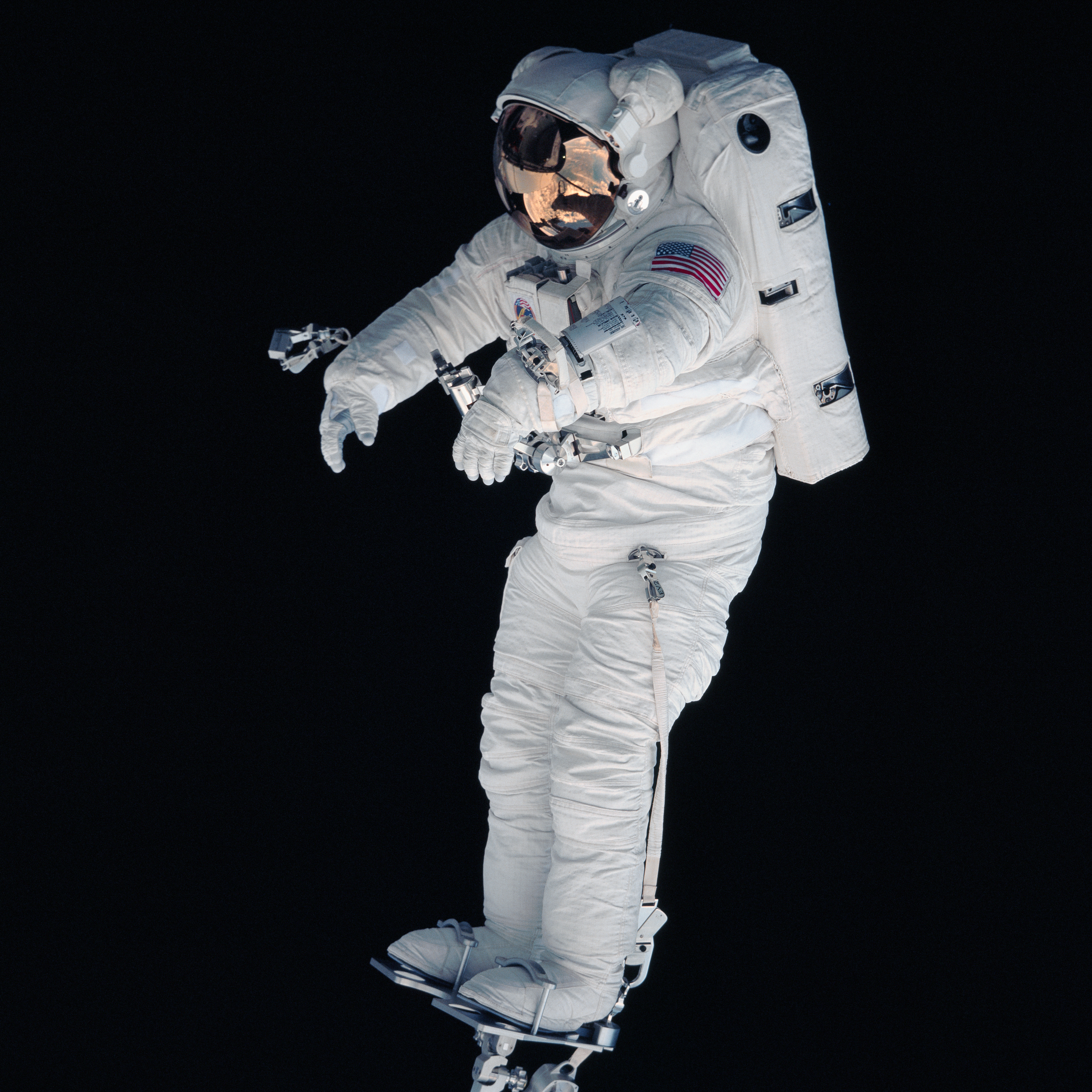
Astronaut Peter Wisoff on a robotic arm, 1993

NASA has successfully launched over 200 crewed flights. Three have ended in failure, causing the death of the entire crew: Apollo 1 (which never launched) in 1967 lost three crew members, STS-51-L (the Challenger disaster) in 1986, and STS-107 (the Columbia disaster) in 2003.

Program	Start date	First crewed flight	End date	No. of crewed missions launched	Notes
Mercury program	1958	1961	1963	6	First U.S. crewed program
Gemini program	1964	1965	1966	10	Program used to practice space rendezvous and EVAs
Apollo program	1960	1968	1972	11^{[a]}	Landed first humans on the Moon
Skylab	1964	1973	1974	3	First American space station
Apollo–Soyuz Test Project	1971	1975	1975	1	Joint with Soviet Union
Space Shuttle program	1972	1981	2011	135^{[b]}	First missions in which a spacecraft was reused
Shuttle-Mir program	1993	1995	1998	11^{[c]}	Russian partnership
International Space Station	1993	1998	Ongoing	65	Joint with Roscosmos, CSA, ESA, and JAXA; Americans flew on Russian Soyuz after 2011 retirement of Space Shuttle
Commercial Crew Program	2011	2020	Ongoing	13	Current program to shuttle Americans to the ISS
Artemis program	2017	2026	Ongoing	1	Current program to bring humans to the Moon again

=== Early Obama administration review ===
In May 2009, the Obama administration announced the launch of an independent review of planned U.S. human space flight activities with the goal of ensuring that the nation is on a vigorous and sustainable path to achieving its boldest aspirations in space. The review was conducted by a panel of experts led by Norman Augustine, the former CEO of Lockheed Martin, who served on the President's Council of Advisers on Science and Technology under both Democrat and Republican presidents.

The "Review of United States Human Space Flight Plans" was to examine ongoing and planned National Aeronautics and Space Administration (NASA) development activities, as well as potential alternatives and present options for advancing a safe, innovative, affordable, and sustainable human space flight program in the years following Space Shuttle retirement. The panel worked closely with NASA and sought input from the United States Congress, the White House, the public, industry, and international partners as it developed its options. It presented its results on October 22, 2009.

In February 2010, Obama announced his proposal to cancel the Constellation program as part of his reform program. Constellation was officially canceled by the NASA Budget Authorization Act on October 11, 2010.

=== Artemis program ===
NASA brought the Orion spacecraft back to life from the defunct Constellation program and successfully test-launched the first capsule on December 5, 2014, aboard EFT-1. After a near-perfect flight traveling 3,600 miles (5,800 km) above Earth, the spacecraft was recovered for study. NASA plans to use the Orion crew vehicle to send humans to deep space locations such as the Moon and Mars starting in the 2020s. Orion will be powered by NASA's new heavy-lift vehicle, the Space Launch System (SLS), which is currently under development.

Artemis I was the first flight of the SLS and was launched as a test of the completed Orion and SLS system. During the mission, an uncrewed Orion capsule spent 10 days in a distant retrograde 60,000 kilometers (37,000 mi) orbit around the Moon before returning to Earth. Artemis II, the first crewed mission of the program, launched four astronauts in April 2026 on a free-return flyby of the Moon at a distance of 8,900 kilometers (5,500 mi).

After Artemis II, the Power and Propulsion Element of the Lunar Gateway and three components of an expendable lunar lander are planned to be delivered on multiple launches from commercial launch service providers.

Artemis III is planned to launch in 2027 aboard an SLS Block 1 rocket and will use the minimalist Gateway and expendable lander to achieve the first crewed lunar landing of the program. The flight is planned to touch down on the lunar south pole region, with two astronauts staying there for about one week.

== Robotic missions ==
=== Suborbital ===
- Anomalous Transport Rocket Experiment (ATREX) – five consecutive launches, 80 seconds apart on March 27, 2012, studied the high-altitude jet stream.
- NASA Sounding Rocket Program
- SHIELDS – launched April 19, 2021, collected data from the heliopause.

=== Earth and Heliocentric satellites ===
- Applications Technology Satellites

- ATS-1, launched December 1966, completed
- ATS-2, launched April 1967, completed
- ATS-3, launched November 1967, completed
- ATS-4, launched August 1968, completed
- ATS-5, launched August 1969, completed
- ATS-6, launched May 1974, completed

- Explorers Program

- Explorer 1, launched January 1958, completed
- Explorer 2, launched March 1958, failed
- Explorer 3, launched March 1958, completed
- Explorer 4, launched July 1958, completed
- Explorer 5, launched August 1958, failed
- Explorer S-1 launched July 1959, failed
- Explorer 6, launched August 1959, completed
- Explorer 7, Launched October 1960, completed

- Biosatellite program

- Biosatellite 1, launched December 1966, completed
- Biosatellite 2, launched September 1967, completed
- Biosatellite 3, launched June 1969, completed

- Cosmic Background Explorer (COBE), launched November 1989, completed
- Upper Atmosphere Research Satellite (UARS), launched September 1991, completed
- Gravity Recovery and Climate Experiment (GRACE), launched March 2002, completed
- Gravity Recover and Climate Experiment - Follow-On (GRACE-FO), launched May 2018, operational
- NPOESS Preparatory Project (NPP) – National Polar-orbiting Operational Environmental Satellite System (NPOESS), launched October 2011, operational
- Echo 1 and 2, launched August 1960 and January 1964, respectively, completed
- Great Observatories

- Hubble Space Telescope, launched April 1990, operational
- Compton Gamma Ray Observatory, launched April 1991, completed
- Chandra X-ray Observatory, launched July 1999, operational
- Spitzer Space Telescope, launched August 2003, completed

- High Energy Astronomy Observatory program

- High Energy Astronomy Observatory 1 (HEAO 1), launched August 1977, completed
- Einstein Observatory (HEAO 2) launched November 1978, completed – first fully imaging X-ray telescope
- High Energy Astronomy Observatory 3 (HEAO 3), launched September 1979, completed

- Imager for Magnetopause-to-Aurora Global Exploration (IMAGE), launched March 2000, completed
- Infrared Astronomical Satellite (IRAS), launched January 1983, completed
- Jason-1, launched December 2001, completed
- OSTM/Jason-2, launched June 2008, completed
- Jason-3, launched January 2016, operational
- Neil Gehrels Swift Observatory (SWIFT), launched November 2004, completed
- Landsat program

- Landsat 1, launched July 1972, completed
- Landsat 2, launched January 1975, completed
- Landsat 3, launched March 1978, completed
- Landsat 4, launched July 1982, completed
- Landsat 5, launched March 1984, completed
- Landsat 6, launched October 1993, failed
- Landsat 7, launched April 1999, operational
- Landsat 8, launched February 2013, operational
- Landsat 9, launched September 2021, operational

- Living With a Star

- Van Allen Probes, launched August 2012, completed – Twin probes studying the Van Allen radiation belt

- Earth Observing System

- Terra, launched December 1999, operational
- Aqua, launched May 2002, operational
- Aura, launched July 2004, operational

- New Millennium Program (NMP)

- Earth Observing-1 (EO-1), launched November 2000, completed
- Space Technology 5 (ST5), launched March 2006, completed
- Space Technology 6 (ST6)

- NanoSail-D, launched August 2008, failed
- NanoSail-D2, launched November 2010, completed
- Orbiting Carbon Observatory (OCO), launched February 2009, failed
- Orbiting Carbon Observatory (OCO-2), launched July 2014, operational
- Origins program

- Far Ultraviolet Spectroscopic Explorer (FUSE), launched June 1999, completed
- Kepler, launched March 2009, completed – searching for Earth-sized exoplanets in the habitable zone
- James Webb Space Telescope, launched December 2021, operational

- Time History of Events and Macroscale Interactions during Substorms (THEMIS), launched February 2007, operational
- Small Explorer program (SMEX)

- Aeronomy of Ice in the Mesosphere (AIM), launched April 2007, completed
- Fast Auroral Snapshot Explorer (FAST), launched August 1996, completed
- Galaxy Evolution Explorer (GALEX), launched April 2003, completed
- Interstellar Boundary Explorer (IBEX), launched October 2008, operational
- Nuclear Spectroscopic Telescope Array (NuSTAR), launched June 2012, operational – X-ray telescope orbiting Earth
- Reuven Ramaty High Energy Solar Spectroscopic Imager (RHESSI), launched February 2002, completed – Sun observing, Earth satellite
- Solar Anomalous and Magnetospheric Particle Explorer (SAMPEX), launched July 1992, completed
- Submillimeter Wave Astronomy Satellite (SWAS), launched December 1998, completed
- Transition Region and Coronal Explorer (TRACE), launched August 1998, completed – Sun observing, Earth satellite
- Wide Field Infrared Explorer (WIRE), launched March 1999, failed

- Solar Terrestrial Probes program

- Hinode (Solar-B)
- Thermosphere Ionosphere Mesosphere Energetics and Dynamics (TIMED)

- Two Wide-angle Imaging Neutral-atom Spectrometers (TWINS)
- Uhuru
- Wilkinson Microwave Anisotropy Probe (WMAP)
- Imaging X-ray Polarimetry Explorer (IXPE)
- BioSentinel
- Carruthers Geocorona Observatory
- Nancy Grace Roman Space Telescope, launching August 2026, enroute
- INCUS, launching 2027, future

=== Sun ===
- Pioneer program

- Pioneer 6, 7, 8, and 9, launched between December 1965 and November 1968, completed – Solar wind, solar magnetic field and cosmic rays

- Helios 1 and 2, launched December 1974 and January 1976, completed
- Ulysses spacecraft, launched October 1990, completed – ESA partnership
- Genesis, launched August 2001, completed – returned sample of solar wind
- Solar and Heliospheric Observatory (SOHO), launched December 1995, operational – ESA partnership
- Advanced Composition Explorer (ACE), launched August 1997, operational
- Solar Maximum Mission (SolarMax), launched February 1980, completed – suffered partial failure after launch; repaired in April 1984 during a Space Shuttle mission
- Solar Terrestrial Probes program

- TIMED, launched December 2001, operational
- Hinode, launched September 2006, operational
- STEREO, launched October 2006, operational
- MMS, launched March 2015, operational
- IMAP, launched September 2025, operational

- Parker Solar Probe, launched August 2018, operational – the first mission into the Sun's corona
- Living With a Star

- Solar Dynamics Observatory (SDO), launched February 2010, operational
- Balloon Array for RBSP Relativistic Electron Losses (BARREL) – two campaigns of 20 balloons each, studying the Van Allen radiation belts, 2012 to 2014 This mission is a complement to the Van Allen Probes (RBSP).

- CubeSat for Solar Particles (CuSP), launched November 2022

=== Moon ===
- Pioneer program

- Pioneer 0, launched August 1958, failed
- Pioneer 1, launched October 1958, failed
- Pioneer 2, launched November 1958, failed
- Pioneer 3, launched December 1958, failed
- Pioneer 4, launched March 1959, completed
- Pioneer P-1, launched September 1959, failed
- Pioneer P-3, launched November 1959, failed
- Pioneer P-30, launched September 1960, failed
- Pioneer P-31, launched December 1960, failed

- Ranger program

- Ranger 1, launched August 1961, failed
- Ranger 2, launched November 1961, failed
- Ranger 3, launched January 1962, failed
- Ranger 4, launched April 1962, failed
- Ranger 5, launched October 1962, failed
- Ranger 6, launched January 1964, failed
- Ranger 7, launched July 1964, completed
- Ranger 8, launched February 1965, completed
- Ranger 9, launched March 1965, completed

- Surveyor program

- Surveyor 1, launched May 1966, completed
- Surveyor 2, launched September 1966, failed
- Surveyor 3, launched April 1967, completed
- Surveyor 4, launched July 1967, failed
- Surveyor 5, launched September 1967, completed
- Surveyor 6, launched November 1967, completed
- Surveyor 7, launched January 1968, completed

- Lunar Orbiter program

- Lunar Orbiter 1, launched August 1966, completed
- Lunar Orbiter 2, launched November 1966, completed
- Lunar Orbiter 3, launched February 1967, completed
- Lunar Orbiter 4, launched May 1967, completed
- Lunar Orbiter 5, launched August 1967, completed

- Clementine, launched January 1994, completed
- Discovery Program

- Discovery 3 – Lunar Prospector, launched January 1998, completed
- Discovery 11 – GRAIL, launched September 2011, completed

- Moon Mineralogy Mapper (M^{3}) – instrument for ISRO's Chandraayan-1, launched October 2008, completed
- Lunar Precursor Robotic Program (LPRP)

- LCROSS, launched June 2009, completed
- Lunar Reconnaissance Orbiter (LRO), launched June 2009, operational
- LADEE, launched September 2013, completed

- Korea Pathfinder Lunar Orbiter's ShadowCam instrument, launched August 2022, operational
- CAPSTONE, launched November 2022, operational
- LunaH-Map, launched November 2022, operational
- Lunar IceCube, launched November 2022, operational
- Lunar Flashlight, launched December 2022, failed
- Commercial Lunar Payload Services

- Peregrine Mission One, launched January 2024, failed
- IM-1, launched February 2024, completed – first commercial lunar landing. First American Moon landing since Apollo 17 in December 1972.
- Blue Ghost Mission 1, launched January 2025, completed
- IM-2, launched February 2025, completed

=== Mercury ===
- Mariner program

- Mariner 10, launched November 1973, completed – flyby of Venus; multiple flybys of Mercury; first spacecraft to Mercury

- Discovery program

- Discovery 7 – MESSENGER, launched August 2004, completed – first to orbit Mercury

=== Venus ===
- Mariner program

- Mariner 1, launched July 1962, failed – intended to be first American flyby of Venus
- Mariner 2, launched August 1962, completed – first flyby of Venus by an operational spacecraft
- Mariner 5, launched June 1967, completed – flyby of Venus
- Mariner 10, launched November 1973, completed – flyby of Venus; multiple flybys of Mercury; first spacecraft to Mercury

- Pioneer program

- Pioneer 5, launched March 1960, completed – interplanetary space between Earth and Venus
- Pioneer Venus project

- Pioneer Venus Orbiter, launched May 1978, completed – Venus orbiter
- Pioneer Venus Multiprobe, launched August 1978, completed – Venus atmospheric probes

- Magellan, launched May 1989, completed – radar mapping of Venus
- Discovery Program

- Discovery 15 – VERITAS, launching 2031, future
- Discovery 16 – DAVINCI, launching 2030, future

=== Mars ===
- Mariner program

- Mariner 4, launched November 1964, completed
- Mariner 6 and 7, launched February 1969, completed
- Mariner 8, launched May 1971, failed
- Mariner 9, launched May 1971, completed

- Viking program

- Viking 1, launched August 1975, completed
- Viking 2, launched September 1975, completed

- Mars Observer, launched September 1992, failed
- Mars Global Surveyor, launched November 1996, completed
- Discovery Program

- Discovery 2 – Mars Pathfinder / Sojourner rover, launched July 1997, completed
- Discovery 12 – InSight, launched May 2018, completed

- Mars Polar Lander, launched January 1999, failed

- Deep Space 2, launched January 1999, failed – (sub-surface probes)

- 2001 Mars Odyssey, launched April 2001, operational
- Mars Exploration Rovers

- Spirit rover, launched June 2003, completed
- Opportunity rover, launched June 2003, completed

- Mars Reconnaissance Orbiter, launched August 2005, operational – Mars orbiter
- Mars Scout program

- Phoenix, launched August 2007, completed – Mars lander
- MAVEN, launched November 2013, completed – orbiter that studied the atmosphere of Mars

- Mars Science Laboratory (MSL) / Curiosity rover, launched November 2011, operational – Mars rover exploring Gale Crater
- InSight, launched May 2018, completed
- Mars 2020

- Perseverance rover, launched July 2020, operational – Mars rover exploring Jezero Crater
- Ingenuity helicopter, launched July 2020, completed – first powered flight on Mars

- EscaPADE, launched November 2025, enroute to mars.

=== Jupiter ===
- Pioneer program

- Pioneer 10, launched March 1972, completed – first to the asteroid belt and Jupiter
- Pioneer 11, launched April 1973, completed – asteroid belt and Jupiter, first to Saturn

- Voyager program

- Voyager 1, launched September 1977, operational – flybys of Jupiter and Saturn; extended mission to explore interstellar medium; most distant human-made object
- Voyager 2, launched August 1977, operational – flybys of Jupiter, Saturn, Uranus, and Neptune; extended mission to explore interstellar medium; first spacecraft to Uranus and Neptune

- Galileo, launched October 1989, completed – Jupiter and its moons
- New Frontiers program

- New Frontiers 2 – Juno, launched August 2011, operational – Jupiter orbiter mission

- Europa Clipper, launched October 2024, enroute

=== Saturn ===
- Pioneer program

- Pioneer 11, launched April 1973, completed – asteroid belt and Jupiter, first to Saturn

- Voyager program

- Voyager 1, launched September 1977, operational – flybys of Jupiter and Saturn; extended mission to explore interstellar medium; most distant human-made object
- Voyager 2, launched August 1977, operational – flybys of Jupiter, Saturn, Uranus, and Neptune; extended mission to explore interstellar medium; first spacecraft to Uranus and Neptune

- Cassini–Huygens, launched October 1997, completed – Saturn and its moons
- New Frontiers program

- New Frontiers 4 – Dragonfly, launching 2028, future

- Enceladus Orbilander, launching 2038, future

=== Uranus ===
- Voyager program

- Voyager 2, launched August 1977, operational – flybys of Jupiter, Saturn, Uranus, and Neptune; extended mission to explore interstellar medium; first spacecraft to Uranus and Neptune

- Uranus Orbiter and Probe, launching 2032, future

=== Neptune ===
- Voyager program

- Voyager 2, launched August 1977, operational – flybys of Jupiter, Saturn, Uranus, and Neptune; extended mission to explore interstellar medium; first spacecraft to Uranus and Neptune

=== Asteroids/comets ===
- New Millennium Program (NMP)

- NEAR Shoemaker, launched February 1996, completed – close study of 433 Eros
- Deep Space 1 (DS1), launched October 1998, completed – first spacecraft propelled by an ion thruster

- Discovery Program

- Discovery 4 – Stardust, launched February 1999, completed – follow-up for Deep Impact's primary mission to 9P/Tempel
- Discovery 6 – CONTOUR, launched July 2002, failed
- Discovery 8 – Deep Impact (primary); EPOXI (extended), launched January 2005, completed
- Discovery 9 – Dawn, launched September 2007, completed – Vesta in 2011-2012, and Ceres in 2015-2018
- Discovery 13 – Lucy, launched October 2021, operational – Will fly by one main-belt asteroid and seven Jupiter Trojan asteroids.
- Discovery 14 – Psyche, launched October 2023, enroute

- New Frontiers program

- New Frontiers 3 – OSIRIS-REx – launched September 2016, operational

- Double Asteroid Redirection Test (DART), launched November 2021, completed
- Near-Earth Asteroid Scout, launched November 2022, failed

=== Dwarf planets ===
- New Frontiers program

- New Frontiers 1 – New Horizons, launched January 2006, operational – flyby of Pluto and its moons in 2015; first to Pluto

- Discovery Program

- Discovery 9 – Dawn, launched September 2007, completed – Vesta in 2011-2012, and Ceres in 2015-2018

== Canceled or undeveloped missions ==
- Comet Rendezvous Asteroid Flyby (CRAF)
- Jupiter Icy Moons Orbiter (JIMO)
- Mars Astrobiology Explorer-Cacher (MAX-C)
- Mars Telecommunications Orbiter (MTO)
- Asteroid Redirect Mission (2013–2017)
- Origins Program

- Space Interferometry Mission (SIM)
- Terrestrial Planet Finder (TPF)

- Pluto Kuiper Express (PLUTOKE) – replaced by New Horizons

- Triton Hopper (Rocket-powered Hopper)

=== Old proposals ===
- Mars Scout program

- Aerial Regional-scale Environmental Survey (ARES) (2000-2010 concept)
- TAU (spacecraft)- probe to 1000 AU (1980s concept)

== See also ==
- NASA:
  - Large strategic science missions, the NASA flagship missions
  - Discovery Program, medium-cost NASA missions
  - New Frontiers program, medium-large NASA missions to outer planets
  - When We Left Earth: The NASA Missions – 2008 documentary covering NASA's mission history.
- Space exploration
- Timeline of Solar System exploration
- List of European Space Agency programmes and missions
- List of ISRO missions

== Bibliography ==
- Grush, Loren (May 17, 2019). "NASA administrator on new Moon plan: 'We're doing this in a way that's never been done before'". The Verge.
- Heaton, Andrew; Sood, Dr. Rohan (August 10, 2020). "Space Launch System Departure Trajectory Analysis for Cislunar and Deep-Space Exploration" (PDF). NASA. p. 7.
