= Multiple satellite imaging =

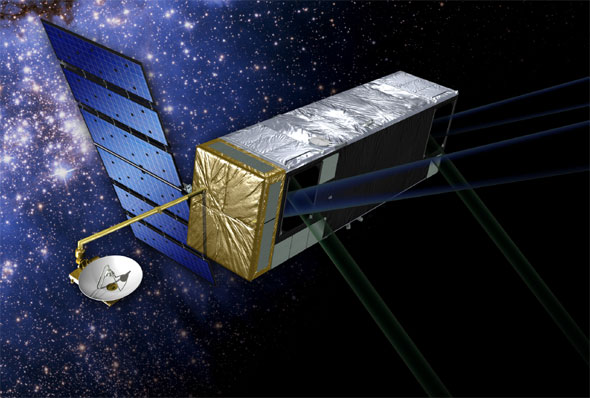
Space Interferometry Mission conceptual picture

Multiple satellite imaging is the process of using multiple satellites to gather more information than a single satellite so that a better estimate of the desired source is possible. Something that cannot be resolved with one telescope might be visible with two or more telescopes.

== Background ==
Interferometry is the process of combining waves in such a way that they constructively interfere. When two or more independent sources detect a signal at the same given frequency those signals can be combined and the result is better than each one individually. An overview of Astronomical interferometers and a History of astronomical interferometry can be referenced from their respective pages.

The NASA Origins Program was created in the 1990s to ultimately search for the origin of the universe. The theory that the Origins Program is based on is: since light travels at a constant speed until it is absorbed by something; there is still light that was part of the first light ever created traveling about the universe and ultimately some of that light is coming in the general direction of Earth. So a satellite system capable of collecting light from the beginning of the universe would be able to tell us more about where we came from.

There is also the constant search for life in other worlds. A satellite system using the interferometric technologies mentioned above would be able to have a much higher resolution than any of the current deep space imaging systems.

== Future ==
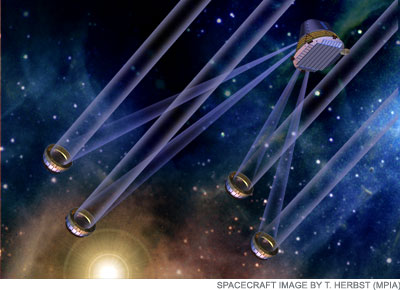
Terrestrial Planet Finder conceptual image by T. Herbst

NASA is currently focused on the Vision for Space Exploration and has reduced current funding for scientific unmanned space exploration in favor of human exploration. These budget cuts have slowed the multiple satellite imaging development and relevant scientific missions as Project Prometheus and Terrestrial Planet Finder have ended as well but research continues.

== See also ==
- Space telescope
