= Navigator Program =

The Navigator Program is a long-term NASA project charged with over-seeing all missions related to the detection and characterization of Earth-like planets. It also seeks to further understand how galaxies, stars, and planets form. Navigator, with a 25-year time window, is essentially an umbrella program for more specific current and proposed projects which seek out Earth analogues and possible extraterrestrial life. The main components of Navigator include two ground-based and two space based missions.

On Earth:

- The Keck Interferometer. Initial interferometeric work began in 2005.
- The Large Binocular Telescope. Operational since 2005.

And in space:

- The SIM Planetquest. Was expected launch in 2015, but was canceled.
- The Terrestrial Planet Finder. First phase was projected to launch 2014, but was canceled.

The Navigator Program is itself an element of even larger decades long project of NASA: the Origins Program, addressing the origins of the universe, astronomical bodies, and life.
