= Henry Warren Moos =

American Astrophysicist

- Moos in the 1950s
- Born: March 26, 1936 (age 90); Brooklyn, New York, U.S.
- Employer: Johns Hopkins University
- Spouse: Doris Elaine McClure (m. 1934; died 2023)
- Children: 4

Academic background
- Education: Brown University (BS); University of Michigan (PhD)

Henry Warren Moos (born March 26, 1936) is an astrophysicist at Johns Hopkins University, who was the Principal Investigator of the Far Ultraviolet Spectroscopic Explorer that launched June 24, 1999, and operated until October 18, 2007. FUSE was designed to study the universe using high-resolution spectroscopy in the far-ultraviolet spectral region, with a primary focus on the origin and evolution of the lightest elements and the forces involved in galactic, stellar, and planetary system evolution.

== Early life and education ==
Moos received a BS in physics from Brown University in 1957 and a PhD in physics from the University of Michigan in 1962. He also served as postdoctoral researcher at Stanford University from 1961 to 1963.

== Career ==
In 1964, Moos joined the Johns Hopkins Department of Physics and was instrumental in creating the combined Department of Physics and Astronomy, a department that he eventually chaired and where he also directed the Center for Astrophysical Sciences and was instrumental in establishing the Space Telescope at the Johns Hopkins University.

According to "A Brief History of the FUSE Mission" by Moos and G. Sonneborn, FUSE's contribution includes the fact that astrophysically important species, such as D I, O VI, and H₂, have key transitions in this spectral range. Hot subdwarf spectra often include unidentified lines due to missing atomic data. FUSE offers greater sensitivity than Copernicus, enabling studies of stars, nearby galaxies, Active Galactic Nuclei, and interstellar gas. "Copernicus explored the local neighborhood - FUSE is exploring the Universe."

In a 2020 interview with David Zierler, Moos answers the question of what kind of physicist he is by saying, "Probably an opportunist . . . . I would say in my early years I was involved on the edge of quantum electronics with a big emphasis on atomic physics. That flavor went through my early faculty years when I was doing solid state physics, but it was still atoms in a cage. I mean it was the same kind of thing. In the late '60s continuing into the early '70s, I started to move into astrophysics. It was an evolution in which I moved away from physics related to quantum electronics. Along the way I did some plasma physics . . . . So how do I characterize myself? I think as an experimental scientist."

Moos is a Fellow of the American Physical Society.
