= List of NASA cancellations =

This is a list of cancellations and terminations made by NASA.

== Program terminations ==
- U.S. participation in ExoMars - 2012
- Mars Scout Program - 2010
- Constellation program - 2010
- New Millennium Program - 2009
- Project Prometheus - 2005

Additional examples

- NASA X-38 (Crew Return Vehicle)- 2002
- Lockheed Martin X-33 - 2001
- HL-20 Personnel Launch System - 1993

== Mission cancellations (developmental) ==
- Lunar Gateway - 2026
- Mars Sample Return - 2026
- Asteroid Redirect Mission - 2017
- Gravity and Extreme Magnetism - 2012
- International X-ray Observatory - 2011
- Terrestrial Planet Finder - 2011
- Laser Interferometer Space Antenna - 2011
- Space Interferometry Mission - 2010
- Mars Telecommunications Orbiter - 2009
- Jupiter Icy Moons Orbiter - 2005
- Europa Orbiter - 2002
- Deep Space 3 (a.k.a. Starlight)
- Deep Space 4 (a.k.a. Champollion)
- Voyager program (Mars) - 1971

== See also ==
- List of NASA missions
- List of extraterrestrial memorials
