= SHIELDS =

Space mission to study light from interstellar particles

The Spatial Heterodyne Interferometric Emission Line Dynamics Spectrometer (SHIELDS) mission is intended to study light from interstellar particles that have drifted into the Solar System in order to learn about the nearest reaches of interstellar space. The purpose of the mission is acquire a spatial map of scattered solar ultraviolet emission from interplanetary hydrogen that has crossed and been modified by the ion pile-up along the outer edge of the heliosphere. SHIELDS was successfully launched by NASA on April 19, 2021, from the White Sands Missile Range, in New Mexico. Flown aboard a sounding rocket, the mission is very short: an instrument stays in space for few minutes.

== See also ==
- List of NASA missions
