= Voyager program (Mars) =

Planned series of uncrewed NASA probes to the planet Mars

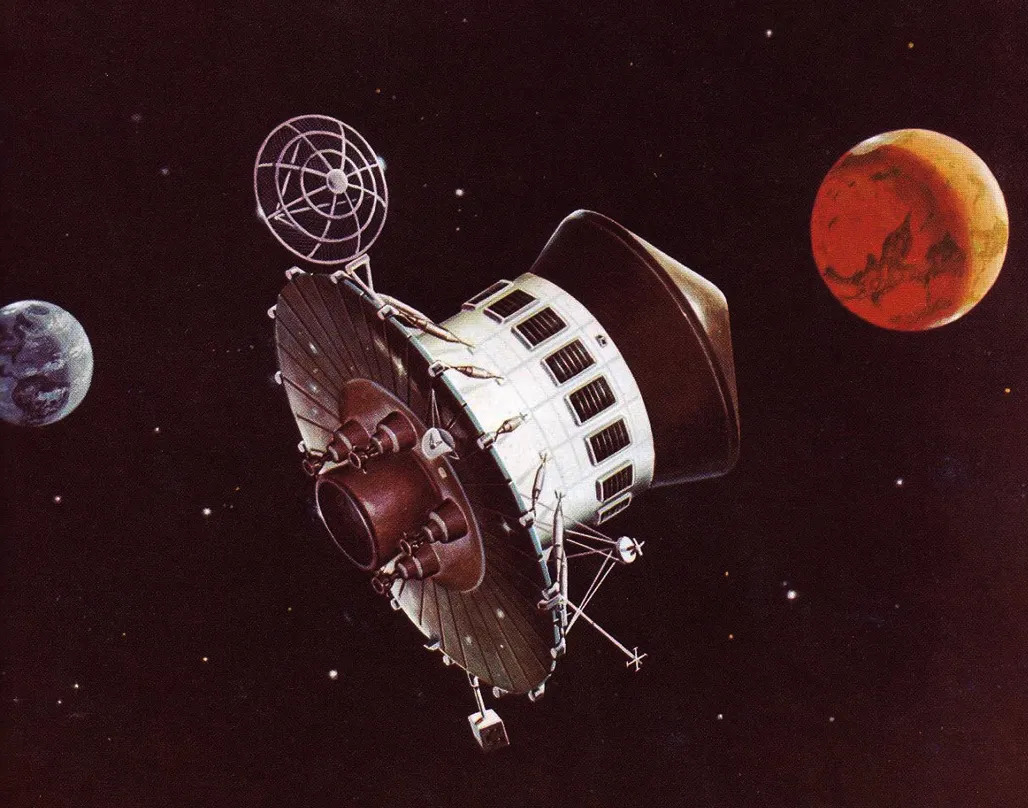
Advanced Voyager concept (1967)

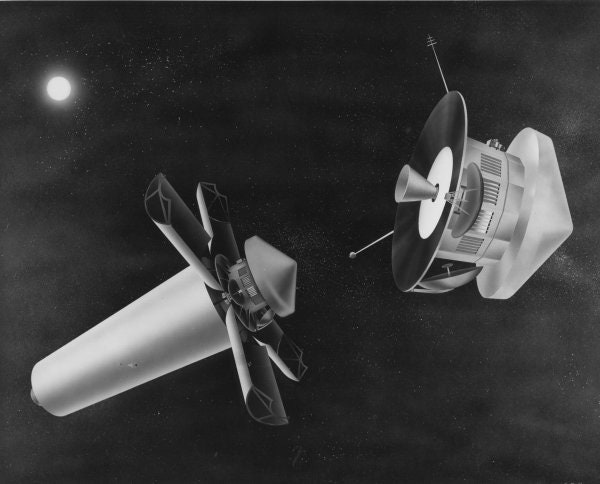
The upper Voyager moves away from the Saturn V S-IVB third stage that placed it on course for Mars.

The Voyager Mars Program was a planned series of uncrewed NASA probes to the planet Mars. The missions were planned, as part of the Apollo Applications Program, between 1966 and 1968 and were scheduled for launch in 1974–75. The probes were conceived as precursors for a crewed Mars landing in the 1980s.

== History ==
Originally, NASA had proposed a direct lander using a variant of the Apollo Command Module launched atop of a Saturn IB rocket with a Centaur upper stage. With the discovery by Mariner 4 in 1965 that Mars had only a tenuous atmosphere, the mission was changed to have both an orbiter and lander. This required the use of a Saturn V to launch two probes at once. The orbiter would have been a modified Mariner probe identical to that employed for Mariner 8 and Mariner 9, while the landers would have been Surveyor moon probes modified with the use of aeroshells and a combination parachute/retrorocket landing systems.

Funding for the program, like that of the entire AAP, was cut in 1968 and the mission itself was cancelled entirely in 1971, mainly on the grounds that launching both probes on a single rocket was both risky and expensive. Voyager was the first major space science project to be cancelled by the U.S. Congress.

Despite the cancellation, the planning and development of the Voyager Mars program was eventually carried out by NASA's Viking program in the mid-1970s. Cheaper and simpler than the Voyager Mars program (using the same Mariner 8/9 design for the orbiter, but with an automobile-sized lander with a very expensive microbiology lab), the Viking 1 and Viking 2 probes were launched to Mars on separate Titan IIIE/Centaur rockets in 1975 and reached Mars in 1976.

After the cancellation, the "Voyager" name was recycled for the Mariner 11 and Mariner 12 probes to the outer planets, with the latter probe, Voyager 2 (Mariner 12), completing another ambitious post-Apollo project, the "Grand Tour". The Saturn V had also been planned at one point as the launch vehicle for an upscaled probe for this mission.

== See also ==
- List of NASA cancellations
