= INCUS =

- Mission type: Weather
- Operator: NASA
- Website: https://incus.colostate.edu/

INCUS is a future mission by NASA to study why convective storms, heavy precipitation, and clouds occur exactly when and where they form.

== Overview ==
The spacecraft is 3 CubeSats funded and developed by NASA & JPL (Jet Propulsion Laboratory) alongside Colorado State University and NOAA. It is one of NASA's Earth Ventures Missions (EVM-3). Its main goal is to enhance our understanding of why, when & where tropical convective storms form, to measure vertical air motion and why only a few storms produce extreme weather. It will be launched by Firefly Aerospace. It is a Class-D mission.

== Instruments ==
It will have Ka rain radars and a MW radiometer.

== Budget ==
The mission will cost around 177 million dollars.
