= Origins Program =

NASA's Origins program is a decades-long study addressing the origins of the universe, various astronomical bodies, and life. The Origins program was started in the 1990s.

So far, it consists of the following missions:

- ground-based
  - Keck telescopes*
  - Large Binocular Telescope Interferometer*
  - Keck Interferometer*
- airborne
  - Stratospheric Observatory for Infrared Astronomy (SOFIA)*
- space based
  - Hubble Space Telescope (HST)*
  - Far Ultraviolet Spectroscopic Explorer (FUSE) - completed
  - Spitzer Space Telescope (SST) - completed
  - Kepler Space Observatory - completed
  - Space Interferometry Mission (SIM) - cancelled
  - Terrestrial Planet Finder (TPF) - cancelled
  - James Webb Space Telescope (JWST) *
  - Single Aperture Far Infrared Observatory (SAFIR)
  - Large UV/Optical Telescope
  - Life Finder
  - Planet Imager

Missions marked with * are operational.
