= W. M. Keck Observatory =

Astronomical observatory in Hawaii

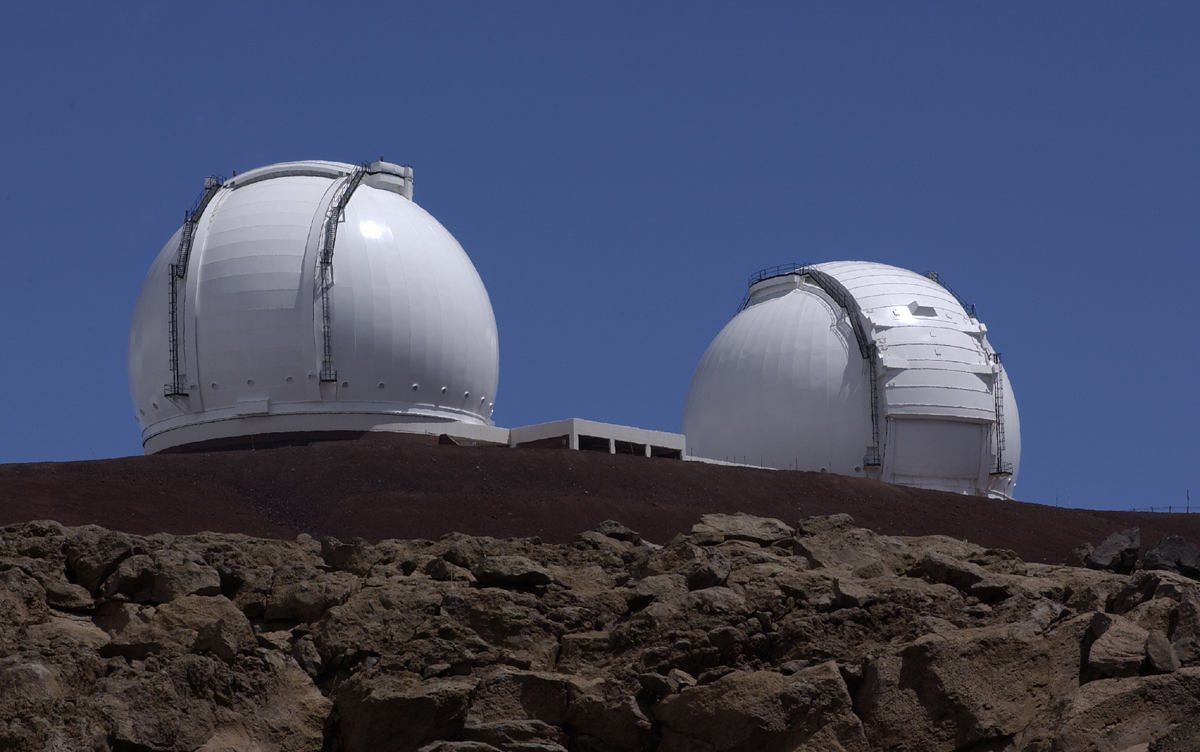
- The Keck observatory domes atop Mauna Kea
- Alternative names: Keck telescope
- Location: Hawaii
- Coordinates: 19°49′35″N 155°28′28″W
- Altitude: 4,145 m (13,599 ft)
- First light: November 24, 1990, October 23, 1996
- Diameter: 10 m (32 ft 10 in)
- Collecting area: 76 m^{2} (820 sq ft)
- Focal length: 17.5 m (57 ft 5 in)
- Website: keckobservatory.org
- Location within Hawaii
- Related media on Commons

The W. M. Keck Observatory is an astronomical observatory with two telescopes at an elevation of 4,145 meters (13,600 ft) near the summit of Mauna Kea in the U.S. state of Hawaii. Both telescopes have 10 m (33 ft) aperture primary mirrors, and, when completed in 1993 (Keck I) and 1996 (Keck II), they were the largest optical reflecting telescopes in the world. They have been the third and fourth largest since 2006.

== Overview ==
With a concept first proposed in 1977, telescope designers Terry Mast, of the University of California, Berkeley, and Jerry Nelson of Lawrence Berkeley Laboratory had been developing the technology necessary to build a large, ground-based telescope. In 1985, Howard B. Keck of the W. M. Keck Foundation gave $70 million to fund the construction of the Keck I telescope, which began in September 1985. First light occurred on November 24, 1990, using 9 of the eventual 36 segments. When construction of the first telescope was well advanced, further donations allowed the construction of a second telescope starting in 1991. The Keck I telescope began science observations in May 1993, while first light for Keck II occurred on April 27, 1996.

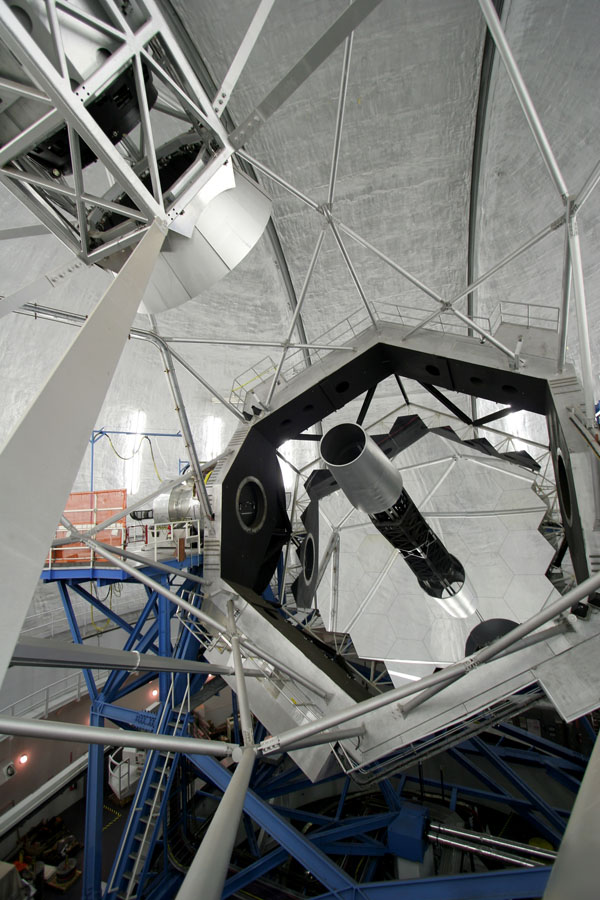
The Keck II telescope showing the segmented primary mirror

The key advance that allowed the construction of the Keck telescopes was the use of active optics to operate smaller mirror segments as a single, contiguous mirror. A mirror of similar size cast of a single piece of glass could not be made rigid enough to hold its shape precisely; it would sag microscopically under its own weight as it was turned to different positions, causing aberrations in the optical path. In the Keck telescopes, each primary mirror is made of 36 hexagonal segments that work together as a unit. Each segment is 1.8 meters wide and 7.5 centimeters thick and weighs half a ton. The mirrors were made in Lexington, Massachusetts by Itek Optical Systems from Zerodur glass-ceramic by the German company Schott AG. On the telescope, each segment is kept stable by a system of active optics, which uses extremely rigid support structures in combination with three actuators under each segment. During observation, the computer-controlled system of sensors and actuators dynamically adjusts each segment's position relative to its neighbors, keeping a surface shape accuracy of four nanometers. As the telescope moves, this twice-per-second adjustment counters the effects of gravity and other environmental and structural effects that can affect mirror shape.

Each Keck telescope sits on an altazimuth mount. Most current 8–10 m class telescopes use altazimuth designs for their reduced structural requirements compared to older equatorial designs. Altazimuth mounting provides the greatest strength and stiffness with the least amount of steel, which, for Keck Observatory, totals about 270 tons per telescope, bringing each telescope's total weight to more than 300 tons. Two proposed designs for the next generation 30 and 40 m telescopes use the same basic technology pioneered at Keck Observatory: a hexagonal mirror array coupled with an altazimuth mounting.

Each of the two telescopes has a primary mirror with an equivalent diameter of 10 meters (32.8 ft or 394 in), slightly smaller than the Gran Telescopio Canarias whose primary mirror has an equivalent diameter of 10.4 meters.

The telescopes are equipped with a suite of cameras and spectrometers that allow observations across much of the visible and near-infrared spectrum.

== Management ==
The Keck Observatory is managed by the California Association for Research in Astronomy, a non-profit 501(c)(3) organization whose board of directors includes representatives from the California Institute of Technology and the University of California. Construction of the telescopes was made possible through private grants of over $140 million from the W.M. Keck Foundation. The National Aeronautics and Space Administration (NASA) joined the partnership in October 1996 when Keck II commenced observations.

Telescope time is allocated by the partner institutions. The California Institute of Technology, the University of Hawaiʻi System, and the University of California accept proposals from their own researchers; NASA accepts proposals from researchers based in the United States.

Jerry Nelson, Keck Telescope project scientist, contributed to later multi-mirror projects until his death in June 2017. He conceived one of the Kecks' innovations, a reflecting surface of multiple thin segments acting as one mirror.

== Instruments ==
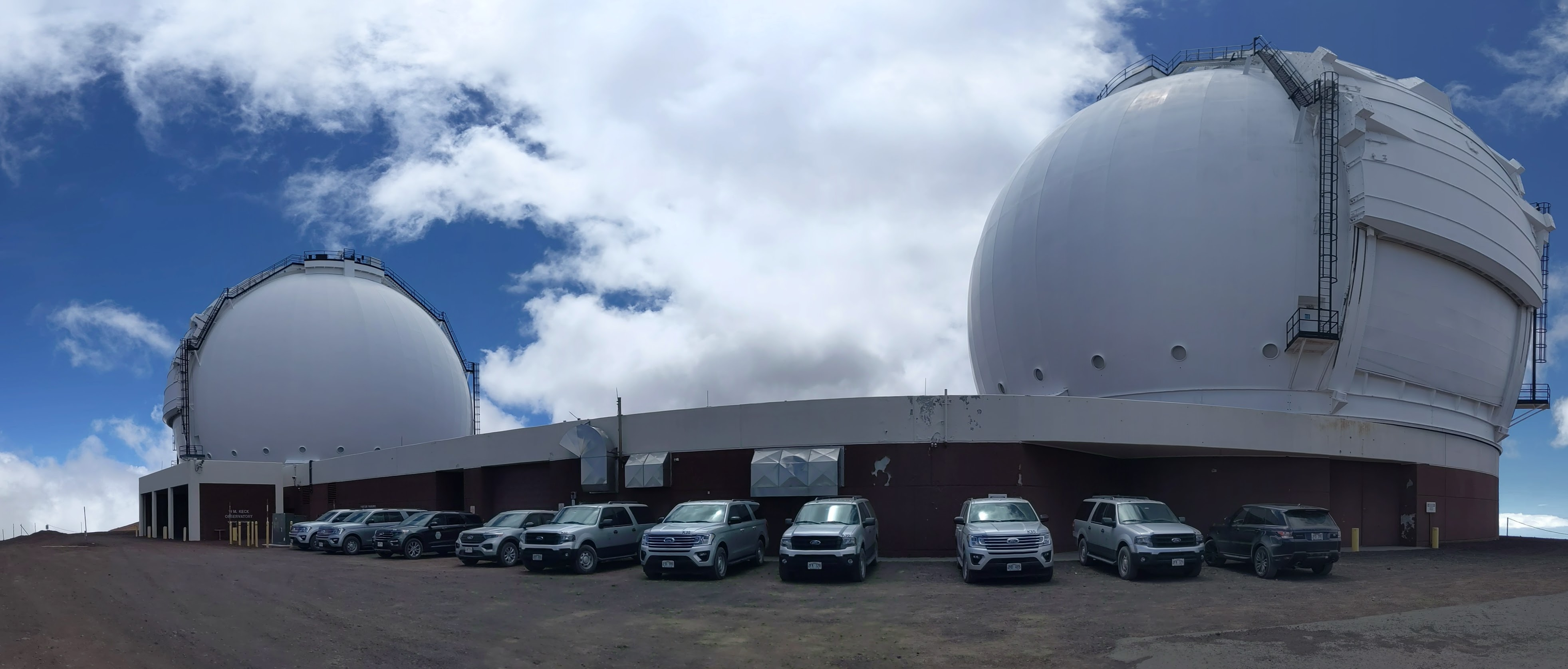
Keck Observatory closeup

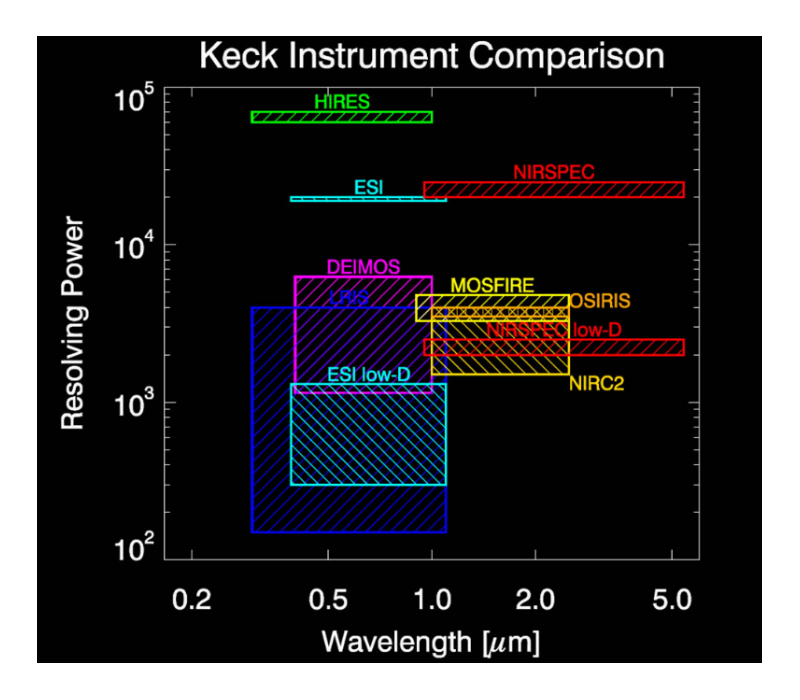
Spectroscopic capabilities of Keck Observatory instruments as of late 2019. Instrument modes appear as color-coded boxes with spectral resolution (resolving power) and wavelength coverage. Non-spectroscopic (i.e. imaging-only) instruments are not shown.

Current instrument suite:

MOSFIRE
MOSFIRE (Multi-Object Spectrometer for Infra-Red Exploration), a third-generation instrument, was delivered to Keck Observatory on February 8, 2012; first light was obtained on the Kecks I telescope on April 4, 2012. A multi-object spectrograph wide-field camera for the near-infrared (0.97 to 2.41 μm), its special feature is its cryogenic Configurable Slit Unit (CSU) that is reconfigurable by remote control in under six minutes without any thermal cycling. Bars move in from each side to form up to 46 short slits. When the bars are removed, MOSFIRE becomes a wide-field imager. It was developed by teams from the University of California, Los Angeles (UCLA), the California Institute of Technology (Caltech) and the University of California, Santa Cruz, (UCSC). Its co-principal investigators are Ian S. McLean (UCLA) and Charles C. Steidel (Caltech), and the project was managed by WMKO Instrument Program Manager Sean Adkins. MOSFIRE was funded in part by the Telescope System Instrumentation Program (TSIP), operated by AURA and funded by the National Science Foundation; and by a private donation to WMKO by Gordon and Betty Moore.
DEIMOS
The Deep Extragalactic Imaging Multi-Object Spectrograph is capable of gathering spectra from 130 galaxies or more in a single exposure. In "Mega Mask" mode, DEIMOS can take spectra of more than 1,200 objects at once, using a special narrow-band filter.
HIRES
The largest and most mechanically complex of the Keck Observatory's main instruments, the High Resolution Echelle Spectrometer breaks up incoming light into its component colors to measure the precise intensity of each of thousands of color channels. Its spectral capabilities have resulted in many breakthrough discoveries, such as the detection of planets outside the Solar System and direct evidence for a model of the Big Bang theory. The radial velocity precision is up to one meter per second (1.0 m/s). The instrument detection limit at 1 AU is 0.2 M_{J}.
KCWI
The Keck Cosmic Web Imager is an integral field spectrograph originally operating at wavelengths between 350 and 560 nm. More recently, the Keck Cosmic Reionization Mapper (KCRM) was added, extending long wavelength coverage from 560 to 1050 nm.
LRIS
The Low Resolution Imaging Spectrograph is a faint-light instrument capable of taking spectra and images of the most distant known objects in the universe. The instrument is equipped with a red arm and a blue arm to explore stellar populations of distant galaxies, active galactic nuclei, galactic clusters, and quasars.
NIRC-2
The second generation Near Infrared Camera works with the Keck Adaptive Optics system to produce the highest-resolution ground-based images and spectroscopy in the 1–5 micrometers (μm) range. Typical programs include mapping surface features on Solar System bodies, searching for planets around other stars, and analyzing the morphology of remote galaxies.
NIRES
The Near-Infrared Echellette Spectrometer is a spectrograph that provides simultaneous coverage of wavelengths from 0.94 to 2.45 microns.
NIRSPEC
The Near Infrared Spectrometer studies very high redshift radio galaxies, the motions and types of stars located near the Galactic Center, the nature of brown dwarfs, the nuclear regions of dusty starburst galaxies, active galactic nuclei, interstellar chemistry, stellar physics, and Solar System science.
OSIRIS
The OH-Suppressing Infrared Imaging Spectrograph is a near-infrared spectrograph for use with the Keck I adaptive optics system. OSIRIS takes spectra in a small field of view to provide a series of images at different wavelengths. The instrument allows astronomers to ignore wavelengths at which the Earth's atmosphere shines brightly from emissions of OH (hydroxyl) molecules, thus allowing the detection of objects 10 times fainter than previously available. Originally installed on Keck II, in January 2012 OSIRIS was moved to the Keck I telescope.
ESI
The Echellette Spectrograph and Imager is a high-resolution spectrograph for optical wavelengths, also featuring imaging capabilities.
KPF
The Keck Planet Finder is the newest instrument on Keck, which achieved first light in 2022. It is an extremely stable, high-resolution spectrograph designed to identify exoplanets via the radial velocity method.

Former instruments:

NIRC
The Near Infrared Camera for the Keck I telescope is so sensitive it could detect the equivalent of a single candle flame on the Moon. This sensitivity makes it ideal for ultra-deep studies of galactic formation and evolution, the search for proto-galaxies and images of quasar environments. It has provided ground-breaking studies of the Galactic Center, and is also used to study protoplanetary disks, and high-mass star-forming regions. NIRC was retired from science observations in 2010.
LWS
The Long Wavelength Spectrometer for the Keck I telescope is an imaging, grating spectrometer working in the wavelength range of 3-25 microns. Like NIRC, the LWS was a forward-CASS instrument, and was used for studying cometary, planetary, and extragalactic objects. The LWS is now retired from science observations.
Keck Interferometer
The Interferometer allowed the light from both Keck telescopes to be combined into an 85-metre-baseline (279 ft), near-infrared, optical interferometer. This long baseline gave the interferometer an effective angular resolution of 5 milliarcseconds (mas) at 2.2 μm, and 24 mas at 10 μm. Several back-end instruments allowed the interferometer to operate in a variety of modes, operating in H, K, and L-band near infrared, as well as nulling interferometry. As of mid-2012 the Keck Interferometer has been discontinued for lack of funding.

Both Keck Observatory telescopes are equipped with laser guide star adaptive optics, which compensate for the blurring from atmospheric turbulence. The equipment is the first AO system operational on a large telescope and has been constantly upgraded to expand its capability.

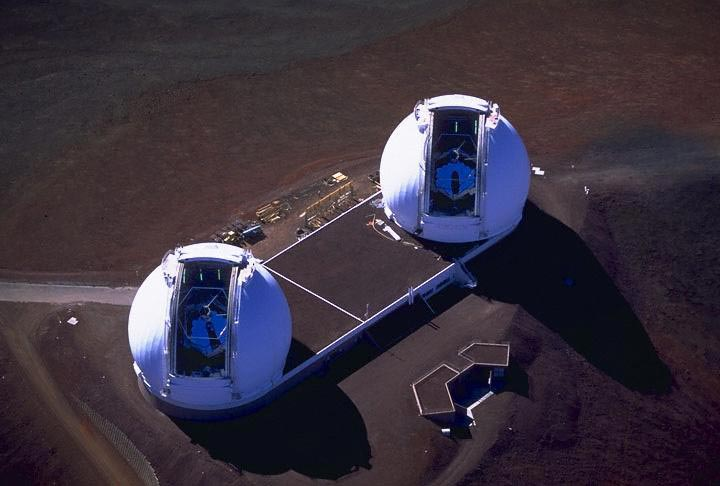
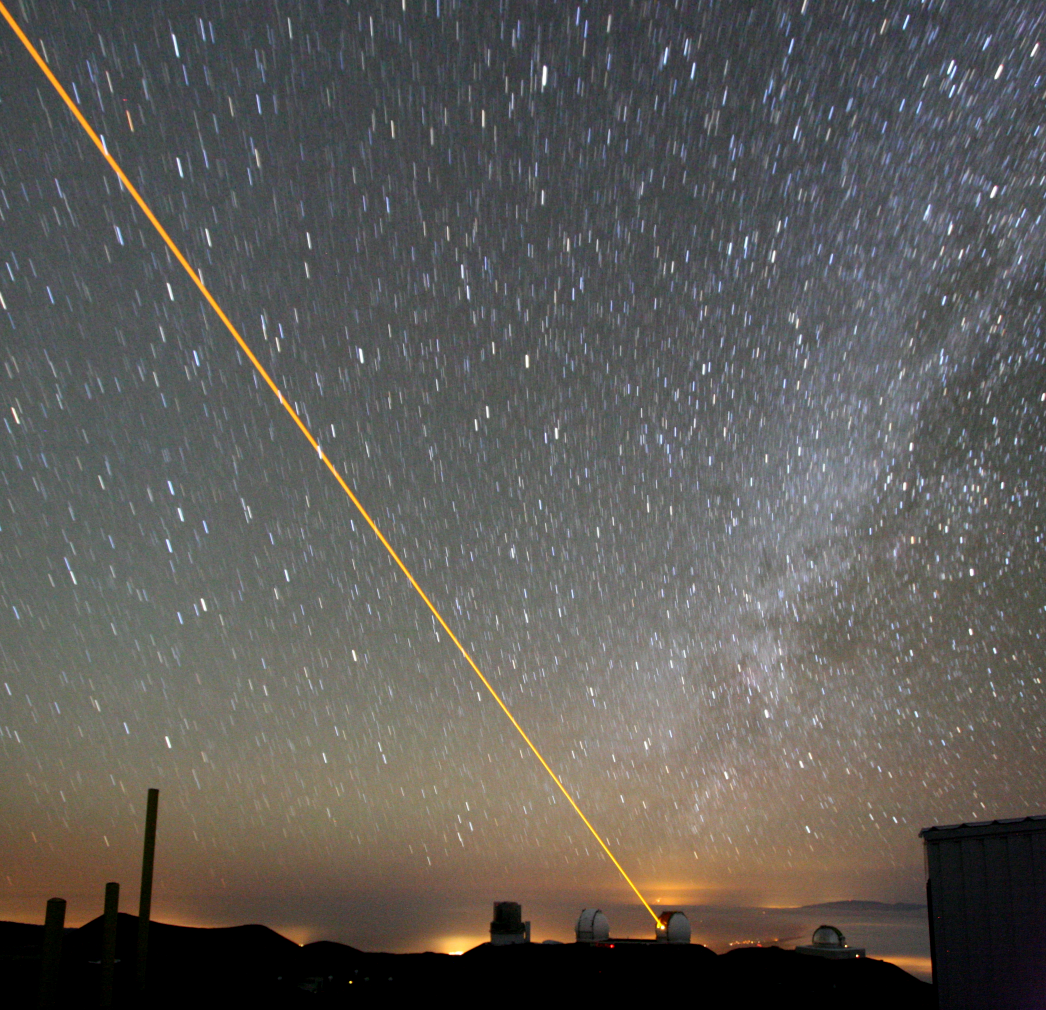
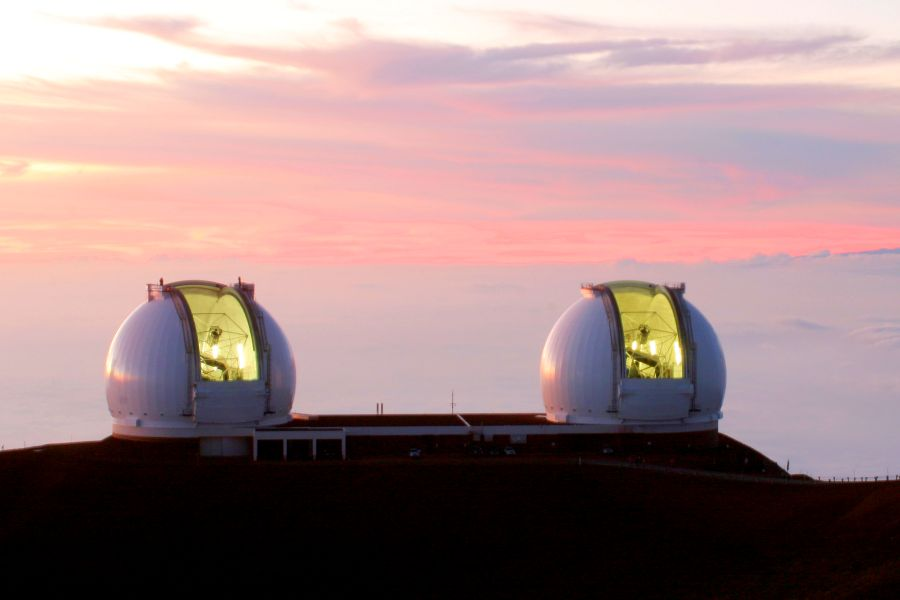
Left: The summit of Mauna Kea is considered one of the world's most important astronomical viewing sites. The twin Keck telescopes are among the largest optical/near-infrared instruments currently in use around the world.
Middle: The night sky and Keck Observatory laser for adaptive optics. Right: W. M. Keck Observatory at sunset

== See also ==
Size comparison of primary mirrors

- Extremely large telescope
- Gemini Observatory
- List of astronomical interferometers at visible and infrared wavelengths
- List of largest optical reflecting telescopes
- List of largest optical telescopes historically
- Mauna Kea Observatories
- Navigator Program
- Subaru Telescope
- Very Large Telescope
