= Far Ultraviolet Spectroscopic Explorer =

NASA satellite of the Explorer program (1999-2007)

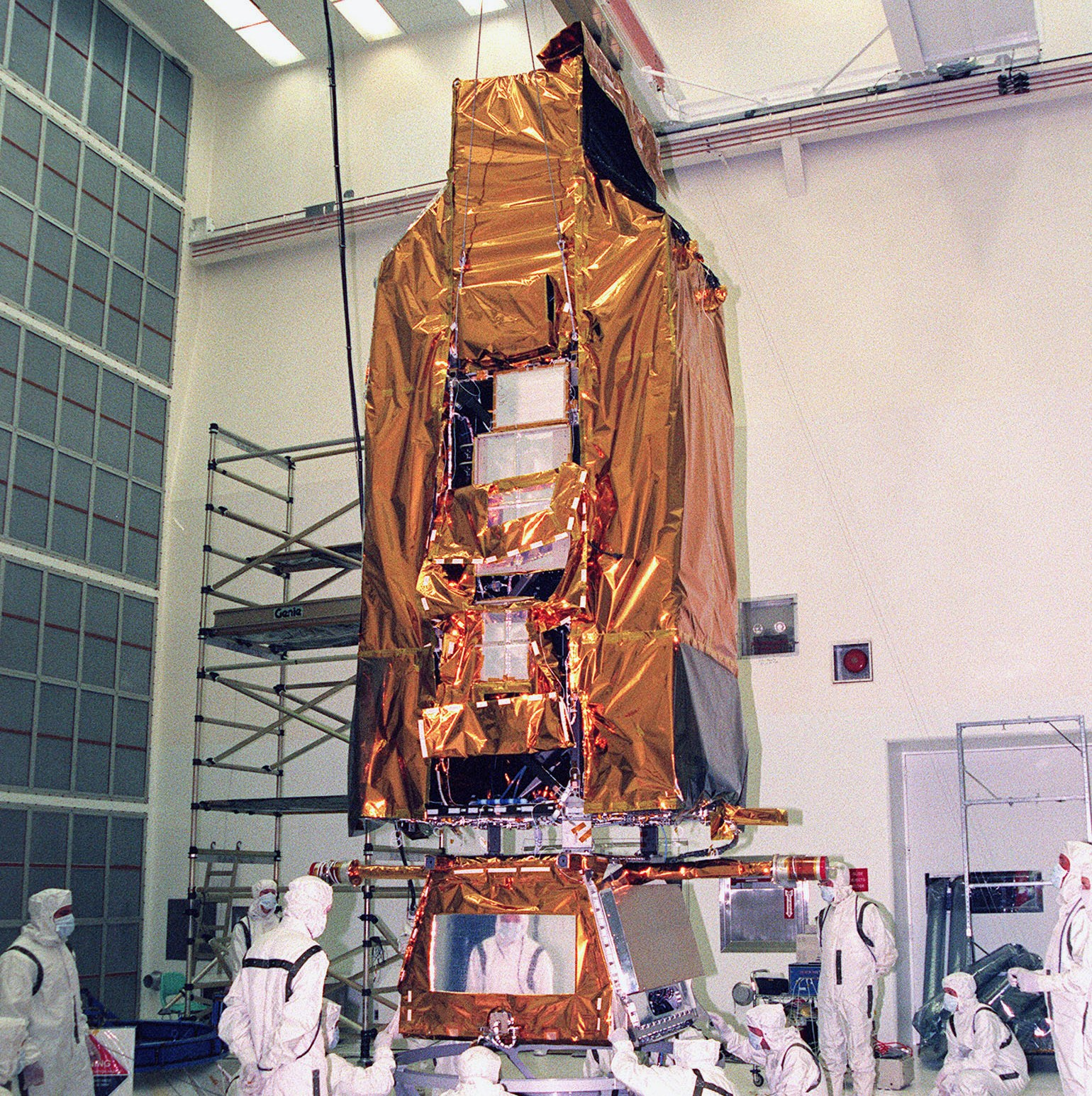
- Far Ultraviolet Spectroscopic Explorer satellite
- Names: Explorer 77; MIDEX-0
- Mission type: Ultraviolet astronomy
- Operator: NASA / CSA / CNES; Johns Hopkins University Applied Physics Laboratory
- COSPAR ID: 1999-035A
- SATCAT no.: 25791
- Website: http://fuse.pha.jhu.edu/
- Mission duration: 3.5 years (planned); 8 years, 3 months, 23 days (achieved)

Spacecraft properties
- Spacecraft: Explorer LXXVII
- Spacecraft type: Far Ultraviolet Spectroscopic Explorer
- Bus: FUSE
- Manufacturer: Orbital Sciences Corporation / JHUAPL
- Launch mass: 1,400 kg (3,100 lb)
- Dimensions: 5.3 × 1.9 m (17.4 × 6.2 ft)
- Power: 520 watts

Start of mission
- Launch date: 24 June 1999, 15:44:00 UTC
- Rocket: Delta II 7320-10 (Delta 271)
- Launch site: Cape Canaveral, LC-17A
- Contractor: McDonnell Douglas
- Entered service: 1999

End of mission
- Deactivated: 18 October 2007
- Last contact: 18 October 2007

Orbital parameters
- Reference system: Geocentric orbit
- Regime: Low Earth orbit
- Perigee altitude: 752 km (467 mi)
- Apogee altitude: 767 km (477 mi)
- Inclination: 24.98°
- Period: 99.80 minutes

Instruments
- Far Ultraviolet Spectroscopy from 100–1800 Angstrom (A)
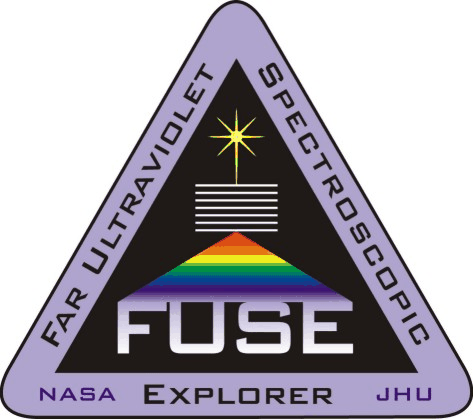
- FUSE mission patch Explorer program

Far Ultraviolet Spectroscopic Explorer (FUSE, Explorer 77, and MIDEX-0) represented the next generation, high-orbit, ultraviolet space observatory covering the wavelength range of 90.5–119.5 nanometre (nm) of the NASA operated by the Johns Hopkins University Applied Physics Laboratory. FUSE was launched on a Delta II launch vehicle on 24 June 1999, at 15:44:00 UTC, as a part of NASA's Origins Program. FUSE detected light in the far ultraviolet portion of the electromagnetic spectrum, which is mostly unobservable by other telescopes. Its primary mission was to characterize universal deuterium abundance in an effort to learn about the stellar processing of deuterium left over from the Big Bang. FUSE resides in a low Earth orbit, approximately 760 km (470 mi) in altitude, with an inclination of 24.98° and a 99.80 minutes orbital period. Its Explorer program designation is Explorer 77.

== Mission ==
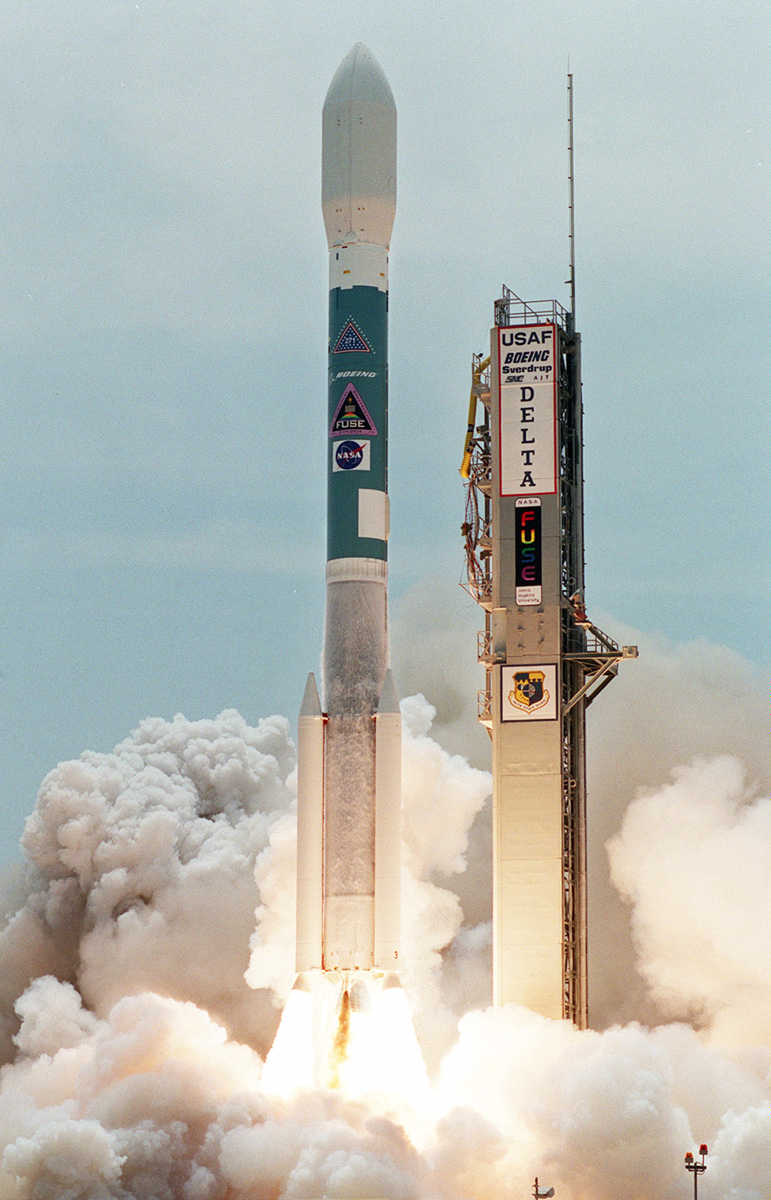
Far Ultraviolet Spectroscopic Explorer (FUSE – Explorer 77) launch

The primary objective of FUSE was to use high-resolution spectroscopy at far ultraviolet wavelengths to study the origin and evolution of the lightest elements (hydrogen and deuterium) created shortly after the Big Bang, and the forces and processes involved in the evolution of galaxies, stars and planetary systems. The spacecraft was launched as a joint NASA-Canada–France project. Only one previous mission, Copernicus (OAO-3), has given this far-ultraviolet region of the electromagnetic spectrum. However, FUSE will provide sensitivity some ten thousand times greater than Copernicus.

=== FUSE primary and extended missions ===
The first 3.5 years of FUSE operations were dubbed the Primary Mission. During this period, the observing time on FUSE was shared roughly 50–50 between the FUSE science team and a host of Guest investigators, astronomers from around the world selected by NASA to participate in the FUSE program. Starting 1 April 2003, the FUSE project entered an extended phase of operations which lasted until mid-2007. With funding from NASA, the FUSE satellite continued to be operated as an observatory for the broad astronomical community, with 100% of on-orbit observing time selected by NASA peer review. Some 29 million seconds of science data were obtained during the Primary Mission phase, and a total of nearly 65 million seconds of data were archived from the entire mission. The Extended Mission period presented a number of challenges, especially for satellite operations. Many procedures had to be automated, allowing the project to cut back on staffing and minimize operations costs. As one example, the Satellite Control Center was staffed around the clock during the Prime Mission but transitioned to a 16-hour per day, Monday through Friday staffing profile in the Extended Mission. Less redundancy and less access to ongoing engineering support were consistent with NASA policy for missions in their extended phase, where a higher level of risk is allowed.

== Spacecraft ==
The FUSE satellite consists of two primary sections, the spacecraft and the science instrument. The spacecraft contains all of the elements necessary for powering and pointing the satellite, including the Attitude Control System, the solar panels, and communications-electronics and antennas. The observatory is approximately 7.6 m (25 ft) long with a baffle fully deployed.

== Instrument ==
The FUSE science instrument consists of four co-aligned telescope mirrors (~39 × 35 cm (15 × 14 in) clear aperture) based on a Rowland circle design. The light from the four optical channels is dispersed by four spherical, aberration-corrected holographic diffraction gratings, and recorded by two delay-line microchannel plate detectors. Two channels with silicon carbide (SiC) coatings cover the range 90.5–110 nm and two channels with lithium fluoride (LiF) coatings cover the range 100–119.5 nm. Actuators on the mirror mountings kept the focus to 90% encircled energy within 1.5". A Fine Error Sensor (FES) with a 21' square field maintained the spacecraft pointing stability to 0.5 arcseconds.

Each mirror has a corresponding astigmatism-corrected, holographically-ruled diffraction grating, each one on a curved substrate so as to produce four 1.65 m (5 ft 5 in) Rowland circle spectrographs. The dispersed ultraviolet light is detected by two microchannel plate detector intensified double delay-line detectors, whose surfaces are curved to match the curvature of the focal plane.

== Operations ==
The FUSE observatory was designed for an operational lifetime of three years, although it was hoped that it might remain operational for as long as ten years. NASA since recommended an additional two-year extension beyond the prime mission. FUSE was controlled through a primary ground station antenna located at the University of Puerto Rico at Mayagüez. FUSE brought it over the ground station for less than 10 minutes at a time (on average) for about six or seven orbits in a row, followed by roughly seven or eight orbits without contact. Hence, the satellite had to operate on its own most of the time, moving from target to target, identifying star fields, centering objects in the spectrograph apertures, and performing the observations. The scientific data, which was stored in digital form, was radioed to the ground during contact with the ground station.

FUSE Science Operations were on hold from 10 December 2001, to approximately the end of January 2002, due to a problem with the pointing system. The last operational reaction wheel on FUSE stopped on 12 July 2007. Attempts to restart any of the reaction wheels were unsuccessful. Although the telescope itself remained in excellent condition, the satellite was incapable thereafter of the fine pointing control required to acquire useful science data, and the mission was terminated.

== Science results ==
Over 400 scientific papers have been written using data from FUSE, with subjects ranging from cool stars to the intergalactic medium. One of the primary science goals of FUSE was to study the abundance of deuterium, an isotope of hydrogen. Because of the large number of atomic absorption and emission lines in the far-ultraviolet, FUSE enabled many studies of galactic, extragalactic, and intergalactic chemistry and chemical evolution.

== Impacts ==
Canada credits work on the FUSE as helping them prepare for making the fine guidance sensors instrument on the James Webb Space Telescope. Canada's contribution is called FGS/NIRISS and is a combined Fine Guidance Sensor, spectrograph, and Far Ultraviolet Camera/Spectrograph.

== See also ==
- Cosmic Origins Spectrograph, instrument on the Hubble Space Telescope from 2009 which operates down to 90 nm
