= Space Interferometry Mission =

Cancelled NASA space telescope

SIM Lite
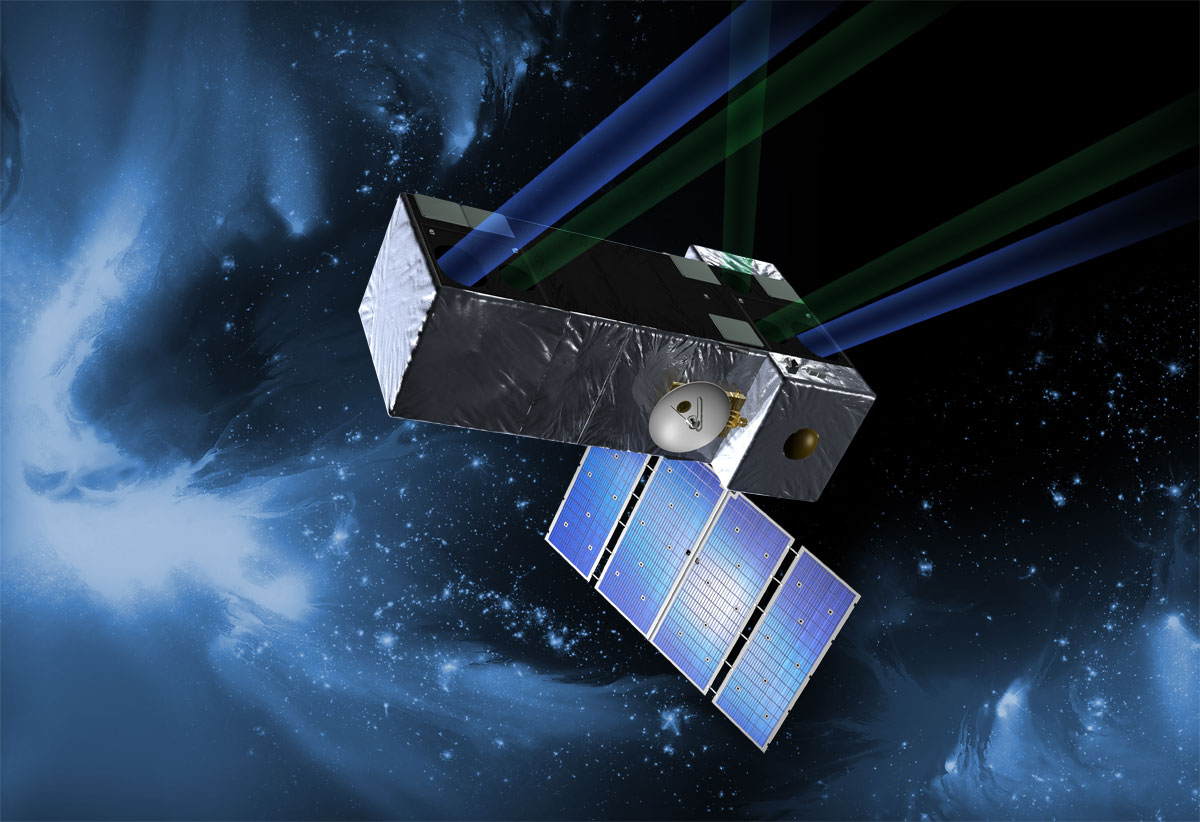
- Artist's concept of the SIM Lite Astrometric Observatory in space
- Names: Space Interferometry Mission PlanetQuest
- Mission type: Space observatory
- Operator: NASA / JPL
- Website: NASA SIM Lite
- Mission duration: 5 1/2–10 years

Spacecraft properties
- Manufacturer: Northrop Grumman

Start of mission
- Launch date: Cancelled in 2010
- Rocket: Intermediate class EELV

Orbital parameters
- Reference system: Heliocentric
- Regime: Earth-trailing

Main telescope
- Type: Optical Michelson Interferometer
- Diameter: 2 × mirrors 50 cm (20 in) baseline 6 m (20 ft); 4 × mirrors 30 cm (12 in) baseline 4.2 m (14 ft)
- Wavelengths: 0.4–0.9 μm
Instruments
- SI: Science Interferometer
- G1: Guide-1 Interferometer
- G2: Guide-2 Telescope

The Space Interferometry Mission, or SIM, also known as SIM Lite (formerly known as SIM PlanetQuest), was a planned space telescope proposed by the U.S. National Aeronautics and Space Administration (NASA), in conjunction with contractor Northrop Grumman. One of the main goals of the mission was the hunt for Earth-sized planets orbiting in the habitable zones of nearby stars other than the Sun. SIM was postponed several times and finally cancelled in 2010. In addition to detecting extrasolar planets, SIM would have helped astronomers construct a map of the Milky Way galaxy. Other important tasks would have included collecting data to help pinpoint stellar masses for specific types of stars, assisting in the determination of the spatial distribution of dark matter in the Milky Way and in the local group of galaxies and using the gravitational microlensing effect to measure the mass of stars. The spacecraft would have used optical interferometry to accomplish these and other scientific goals.

The initial contracts for SIM Lite were awarded in 1998, totaling US$200 million. Work on the SIM project required scientists and engineers to move through eight specific new technology milestones, and by November 2006, all eight had been completed. SIM Lite was originally proposed for a 2005 launch, aboard an Evolved Expendable Launch Vehicle (EELV). As a result of continued budget cuts, the launch date was pushed back at least five times. NASA had set a preliminary launch date for 2015. As of February 2007, many of the engineers working on the SIM program had moved on to other areas and projects, and NASA directed the project to allocate its resources toward engineering risk reduction. However, the preliminary budget for NASA for 2008 included zero dollars for SIM.

In 2007, the Congress restored funding for fiscal year 2008 as part of an omnibus appropriations bill which the President later signed. At the same time the Congress directed NASA to move the mission forward to the development phase. In 2009 the project continued its risk reduction work while waiting for the findings and recommendations of the Astronomy and Astrophysics Decadal Survey, Astro2010, performed by the National Academy of Sciences, which would determine the project's future.

In 2010, the Astro2010 Decadal Report was released and did not recommend that NASA continue the development of the SIM Lite Astrometric Observatory. This prompted NASA Astronomy and Physics Director, Jon Morse, to issue a letter on 24 September 2010 to the SIM Lite project manager, informing him that NASA was discontinuing its sponsorship of the SIM Lite mission and directing the project to discontinue Phase B activities immediately or as soon as practical. Accordingly, all SIM Lite activities were closed down by the end of calendar year 2010.

== Mission ==
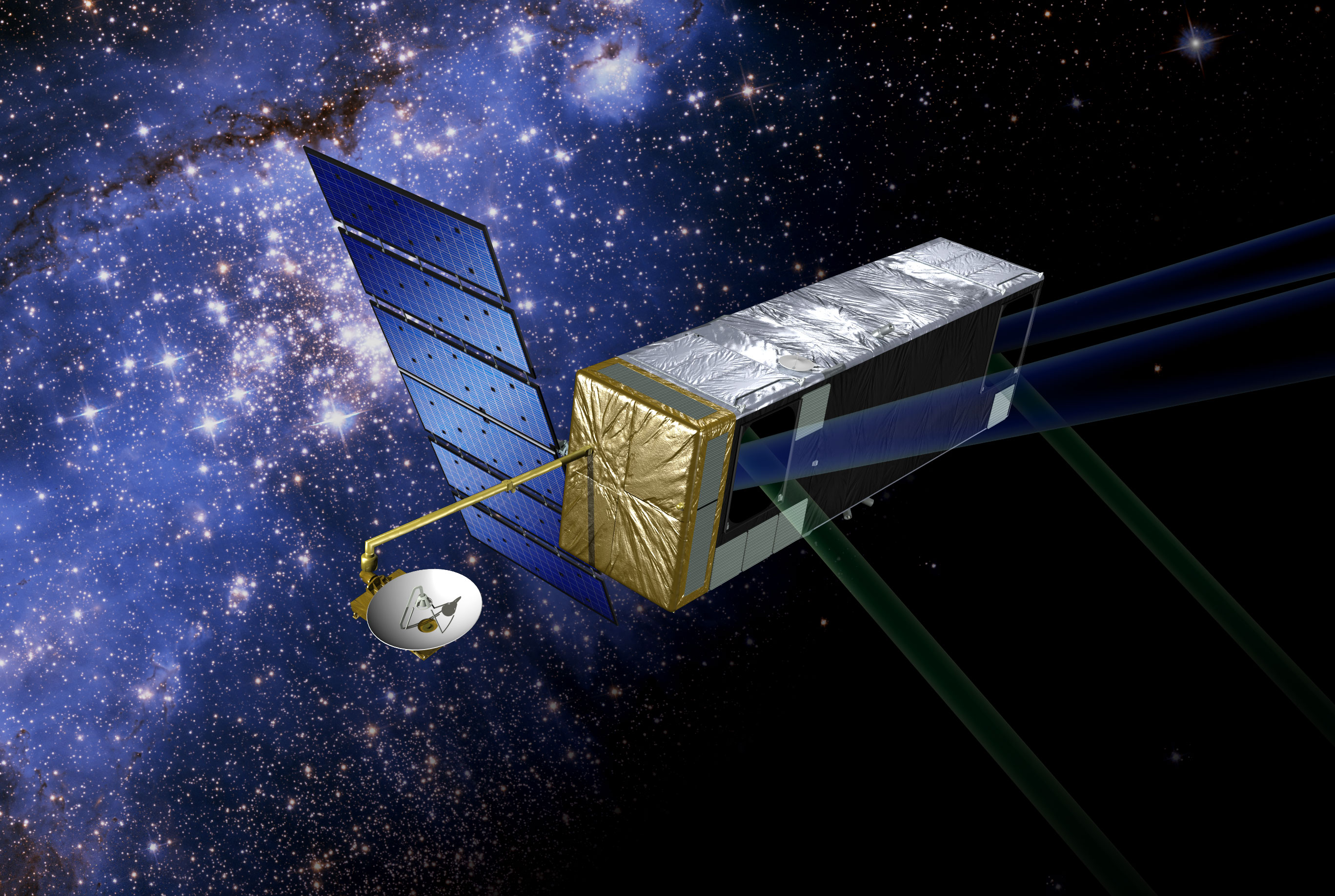
A 2006 artist's impression of the SIM Lite predecessor, SIM PlanetQuest, design

SIM Lite would have operated in an Earth-trailing heliocentric orbit, drifting away from Earth at the rate of 0.1 AU per year ultimately reaching a distance of 82 million km from Earth. This would have taken approximately 5 1/2 years. The Sun would have continuously shone on the spacecraft, allowing it to avoid the occultations of target stars and eclipses of the Sun that would occur in an Earth orbit.

Had it been launched, SIM would have performed scientific research for five years.

=== Planet hunting ===
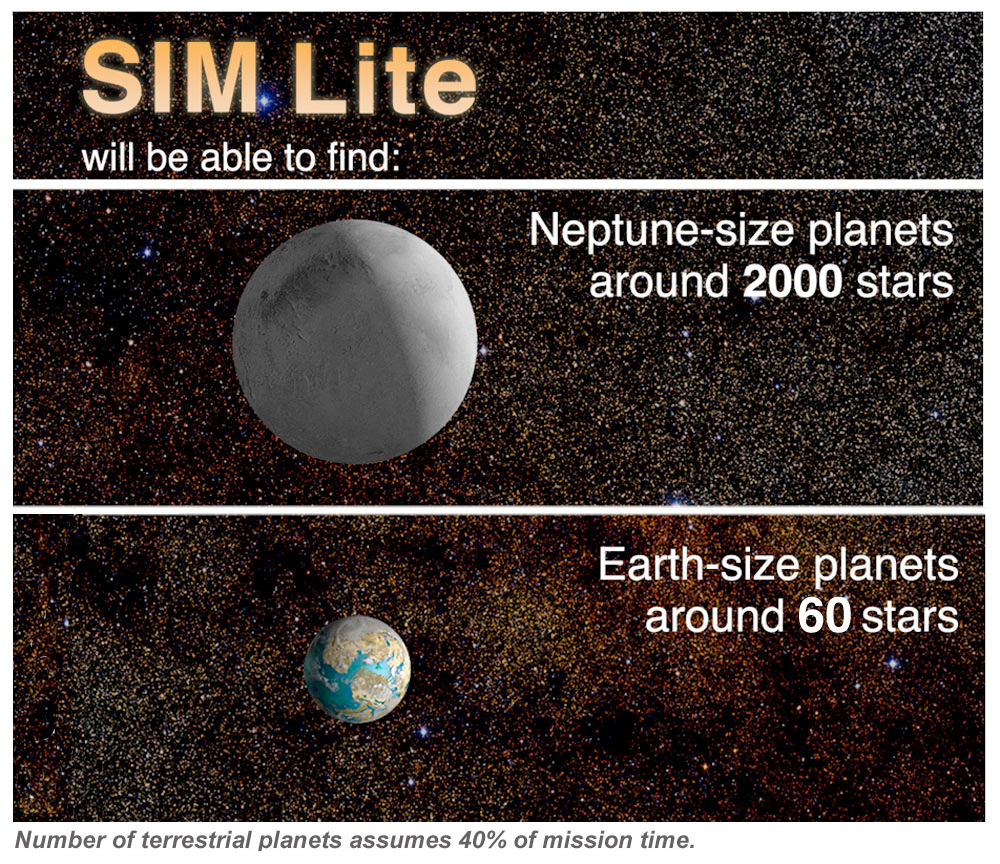
This chart depicts the potential number of habitable planets and other planets that SIM Lite was expected to detect. The number of one-Earth mass planets assumes 40% of mission time is assigned to the search.

SIM Lite would have been the most powerful extrasolar planet hunting space telescope ever built. Through the technique of interferometry the spacecraft would be able to detect Earth-sized planets. SIM Lite was to perform its search for nearby, Earth-like planets by looking for the "wobble" in the parent star's apparent motion as the planet orbits. The spacecraft would have accomplished this task to an accuracy of one millionth of an arcsecond, or the thickness of a nickel viewed at the distance from Earth to the Moon. Titled the Deep Search, the planet hunting program was intended to search approximately 60 nearby stars for terrestrial planets (like Earth and Venus) in the habitable zone (where liquid water can exist throughout a full revolution (one "year") of the planet around its star). The Deep Search was to be the most demanding in terms of astrometric accuracy, hence the name, Deep Search. This program would have used the full capability of the SIM Lite spacecraft to make its measurements.

A flexible search strategy tunes SIM Lite's mass sensitivity at each star to a desired level in the habitable planet search. The value of η_{Earth} (Eta_Earth), the fraction of stars carrying Earth-analog planets, will be estimated by the Kepler Mission some time before SIM Lite launches. One strategy for a habitable planet search is to do a 'deeper' search (i.e. to lower mass sensitivity in the habitable zone) of a smaller number of targets if Earth analogs are common. A 'shallower' search of a larger number of targets could have been done if Earth analogs are rarer. For example, assuming that 40% of mission time is allocated for the planet search, SIM Lite could have surveyed:

- 65 stars for planets down to one Earth mass, in scaled 1 AU orbits, OR
- 149 stars for planets down to two Earth masses, in scaled 1 AU orbits, OR
- 239 stars for planets down to three Earth masses, in scaled 1 AU orbits.

Aside from searching for Earth-sized planets SIM Lite was scheduled to perform what has been dubbed the "Broad Survey". The Broad Survey would have looked at approximately 1,500 stars to help determine the abundance of Neptune-mass and larger planets around all star-types in Earth's sector of the Milky Way.

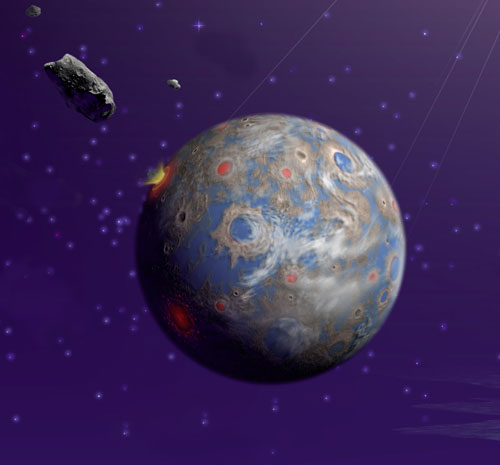
SIM Lite would have been able to detect Earth-sized planets, such as in this artist's rendering.

A third part of the planet finding mission was the search for Jupiter-mass planets around young stars. The survey would have helped scientists understand more about solar system formation, including the occurrence of hot Jupiters. This portion of the planet hunt was designed to study systems with one or more Jupiter mass planets before the system has reached long term equilibrium. Planet hunting techniques using a star's radial velocity cannot measure the regular, tiny to-and-fro wobble motions induced by planets against the strong atmospheric activity of a youthful star. It is through the techniques pioneered by Albert A. Michelson that the SIM would have been able to execute its three primary planet-finding missions.

The mission's planet finding component was set up to serve as an important complement to the future missions designed to image and measure terrestrial and other exoplanets. SIM Lite was to perform an important task that these missions will not be capable of: determining planet masses. Another task that the SIM was envisioned to perform for the future missions will include providing the orbital characteristics of the planets. With this knowledge other missions can estimate the optimal times and projected star–planet separation angles for them to observe the terrestrial (and other) planets SIM has detected.

=== Stellar mass ===
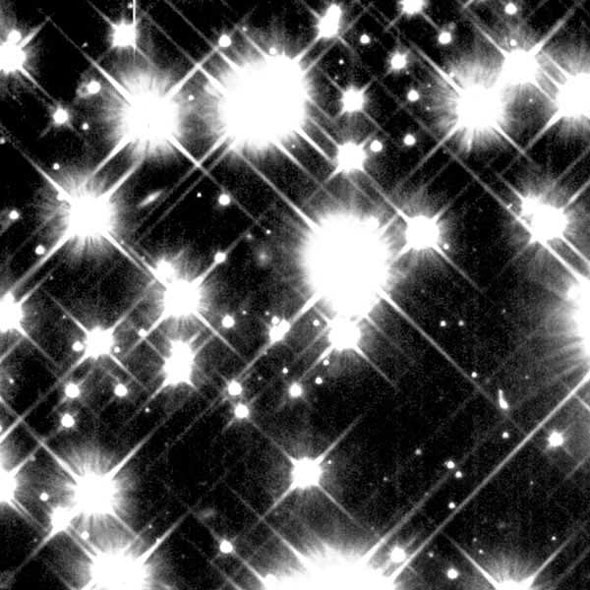
White dwarfs, imaged by NASA's Hubble Space Telescope

Another key aspect of SIM Lite's mission was determining the upper and lower limits of star's masses. Today, scientists understand that there are limits to how small or large a star can be. Objects that are too small lack the internal pressure to initiate thermonuclear fusion, which is what causes a star to shine. These objects are known as brown dwarfs and represent the lower end of the stellar mass scale. Stars that are too large become unstable and explode in a supernova.

Part of the SIM's mission was to provide pinpoint measurements for the two extremes in stellar mass and evolution. The telescope will not be able to measure the mass of every star in the Galaxy, since there are over 200 billion, but instead, it will take a "population census." Through this technique, SIM will be able to output accurate masses for representative examples for nearly every star type, including brown dwarfs, hot white dwarfs, red giant stars, and elusive black holes. Current space telescopes, including NASA's Hubble Space Telescope, can accurately measure mass for some types of stars, but not all. Estimates put the range for stellar mass somewhere between 8% the mass of the Sun and in excess of 60 times the mass of the Sun. The entire study was to focus on binary star systems, stars coupled through a mutual gravitational attraction.

=== Galactic mapping ===
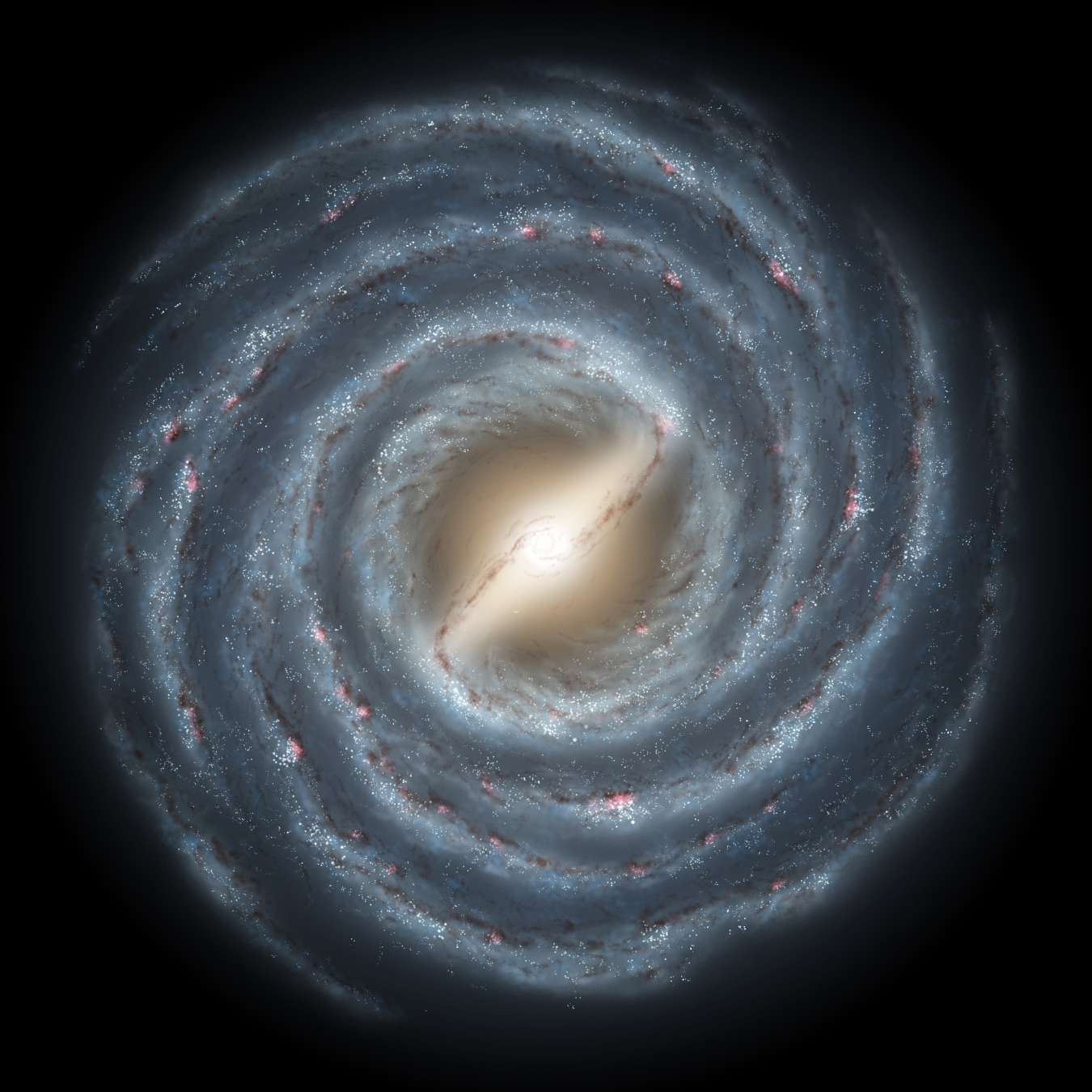
How scientists think the Milky Way is shaped

Interferometric measurements of stellar positions over the course of the mission would have permitted SIM to precisely measure the distances between stars throughout the Milky Way. This would have allowed astronomers to create a "roadmap" of the Galaxy, answering many questions about its shape and size.

Currently, astronomers know little about the shape and size of our galaxy relative to what they know about other galaxies; it is difficult to observe the entire Milky Way from the inside. A good analogy is trying to observe a marching band as a member of the band. Observing other galaxies is much easier because humans are outside those galaxies. Steven Majewski and his team planned to use SIM Lite to help determine not only the shape and size of the Galaxy but also the distribution of its mass and the motion of its stars.

SIM Lite measurements of Milky Way stars were to yield data to understand four topics: fundamental galactic parameters, the Oort Limit, disk mass potential, and mass of the Galaxy to large radii. The first, fundamental galactic parameters, was aimed at answering key questions about the size, shape and the rotation rate of the Milky Way. The team hoped to more accurately determine the distance from the Sun to the Galactic Center. The second topic, the Oort Limit, would have attempted to determine the mass of the galactic disk.

The third project topic was disk mass potential. This topic was designed to make measurements of the distances to disk stars as well as their proper motions. The results of the third topic of study were to be combined with the results of the fundamental galactic parameters portion of the study to determine the Solar System's position and velocity in the galaxy. The final topic dealt with dark matter distribution in the Milky Way. SIM data was to be used to create a three-dimensional model of mass distribution in the Galaxy, out to a radius of 270 kiloparsecs (kps). Astronomers were to then use two different tests to determine the galactic potential at large radii.

=== Dark matter ===
The gray portion of this pie graph shows the estimated distribution of dark matter in the universe.

Dark matter is the matter in the universe that cannot be seen. Because of the gravitational effect it exerts on stars and galaxies, scientists know that approximately 80% of the matter in the universe is dark matter. The spatial distribution of dark matter in the universe is largely unknown; SIM Lite would have helped scientists answer to this question.

The strongest evidence for dark matter comes from galactic motion. Galaxies rotate much faster than the amount of visible matter suggests they should; the gravity from the ordinary matter is not enough to hold the galaxy together. Scientists theorize that the galaxy is held together by huge quantities of dark matter. Similarly, clusters of galaxies do not appear to have enough visible matter to gravitationally balance the high speed motions of their component galaxies.

Besides measuring stellar motions within the Milky Way, SIM Lite was to measure the internal and average galactic motion of some of the neighboring galaxies near the Milky Way. The telescope's measurements were to be used in conjunction with other, currently available, data to provide astronomers with the first total mass measurements of individual galaxies. These numbers would enable scientists to estimate the spatial distribution of dark matter in the local group of galaxies, and by extension, throughout the universe.

== Development ==
=== Beginnings ===
The Space Interferometry Mission began as a four-month preliminary architecture study in March 1997. NASA selected TRW's Space & Electronics Group, Eastman Kodak and Hughes Danbury Optical Systems to conduct the study. In 1998, TRW Inc. was selected as the contractor for the SIM Lite project; Northrop Grumman acquired part of TRW in 2002 and took over the contract. Also selected was Lockheed Martin Missiles and Space located in Sunnyvale, California. The two contracts, which included the mission formulation and implementation phases, were announced in September 1998 and worth a total of over US$200 million. The formulation phase of the mission included initial mission design and planning for the full scale implementation of the mission. At the time of the NASA announcement, launch was scheduled for 2005 and the mission was part of the Origins Program, a series of missions designed to answer questions such as the origin of life Earth.

In August 2000, NASA asked project managers to consider looking at the Space Shuttle, instead of the previously proposed EELV, as a launch vehicle. In late November 2000, NASA announced that the project's scientific team was selected. The group included notable names from the world of extrasolar planet research. The entire group consisted of 10 principal investigators and five mission specialists. At the time of this NASA announcement launch was scheduled for 2009 and the mission was still part of the Origins Program.

=== New technologies ===
SIM's new technology was meant to lead to the development of telescopes powerful enough to take images of Earth-like extrasolar planets orbiting distant stars and to determine whether those planets are able to sustain life. NASA has already started developing future missions that will build on SIM's technological legacy. The technological development phase of the mission was completed in November 2006 with the announcement that the eight, mission-technology-milestones set by NASA were reached. The milestones were necessary steps in the technological development before flight control instruments could begin to be designed. The completion of each milestone meant that new systems had to be developed for nanometer control as well as picometer knowledge technology; these systems enable the telescope to make its accurate measurements with extreme accuracy.

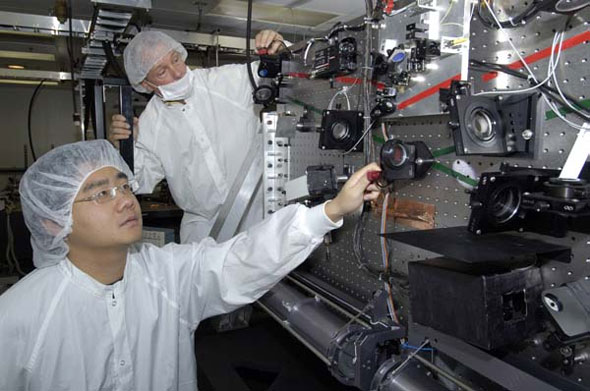
Engineers at JPL examine components on an optical bench that simulates the precision performance of NASA's future SIM Lite mission.

One of the new technologies developed for the mission were high-tech "rulers", capable of making measurements in increments a fraction of the width of a hydrogen atom. In addition, the rulers were developed to work as a network. The mission team also created "shock absorbers" to alleviate the effects of tiny vibrations in the spacecraft which would impede accurate measurements. Another of the milestones involved combining the new "rulers" and "shock absorbers" to prove that the Space Interferometry Mission craft could detect the tiny wobbles in stars caused by Earth-sized planets. The fifth of the technology milestones required the demonstration of the Microarcsecond Metrology Testbed at a performance of 3,200 picometers over its wide angle field of view. The wide angle measurements were to be used to determine the fixed positions of stars each time they were measured. This level of performance demonstrated SIM Lite's ability to calculate the astrometric grid. Another key development, known as gridless narrow-angle astrometry (GNAA), was the ability to apply the measurement capability worked out in the wide angle milestone and take it a step further, into narrow-angle measurements. Aiming to give an accuracy of 1 micro-arcsecond to the early stages of the SIM, the technique allows star positions to be measured without first setting up a grid of reference stars; instead, it sets up a reference frame using several reference stars and a target star observed from different locations, and star positions are calculated using delay measurements from separate observations. The narrow angle field was to be used by SIM to detect terrestrial planets; the team applied the same criteria to both the narrow and wide angle measurements. The final requirement before beginning work on flight controls was to make sure that all of the systems developed for the mission worked cohesively; this final NASA technology goal was completed last as it was dependent upon the others.

=== Status after 2006 ===
Between the end of April and June 2006 the project completed three engineering milestones and from 2–8 November 2006 SIM completed a "Spacecraft Internal Design Review." As of June 2008, all of the eight engineering milestones were successfully completed.

The project had been in Phase B since June 2003. Jet Propulsion Laboratory's "Phase B" is called the "Preliminary Design" phase. Phase B further develops the mission concept developed during Phase A to prepare the project for entry into the Implementation Phase of the project. Requirements are defined, schedules are determined, and specifications are prepared to initiate system design and development." In addition, as part of Phase B, the SIM Lite project was to go through a number of reviews by NASA including System Requirements Review, System Design Review, and Non-Advocate Review. During this phase, experiments would have been proposed, peer reviewed, and eventually selected by NASA's Office of Space Science. Experiment selections are based on scientific value, cost, management, engineering, and safety.

=== Planned launch ===
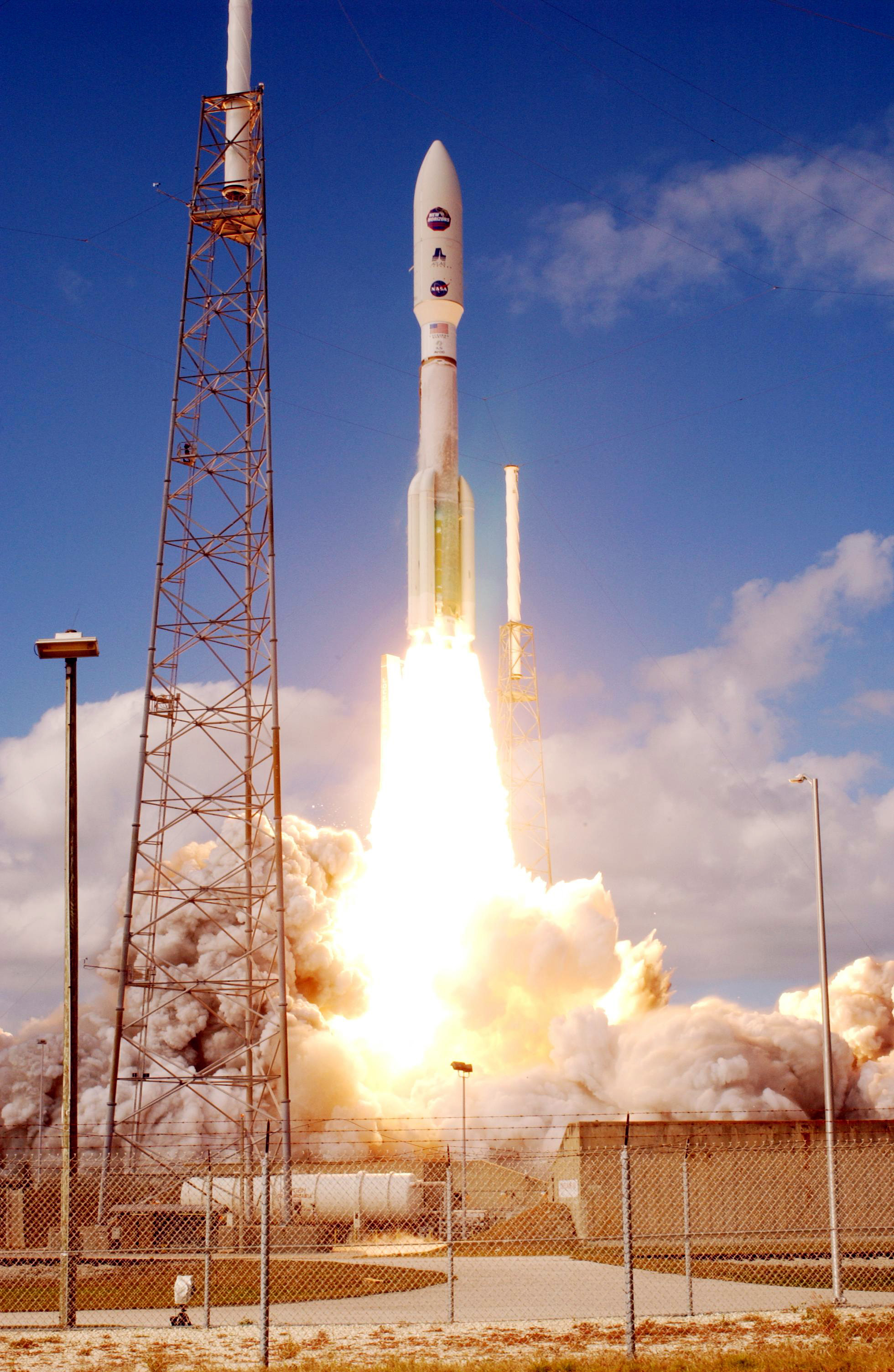
An Atlas V 551, such as this one launching the New Horizons probe, was one of the possible launch vehicles for SIM.

The launch date for the SIM Lite mission was pushed back at least five times. At the program's outset, in 1998, the launch was scheduled for 2005. By 2000, the launch date had been delayed until 2009, a date that held through 2003; though some project scientists cited 2008 in late 2000. Between 2004 and 2006, contractor Northrop Grumman, the company designing and developing SIM, listed a launch date of 2011 on their website. With the release of the FY 2007 NASA budget, predictions changed again, this time to a date no earlier than 2015 or 2016. The delay of the launch date was primarily related to budget cuts made to the SIM Lite program. The 2007 change represented a difference of about three years from the 2006 launch date, outlined in NASA's FY 2006 budget as being two years behind 2005 budget predictions. Other groups predicted dates matching officially predicted launch dates; the NASA Exoplanet Science Institute (formerly the Michelson Science Center) at the California Institute of Technology also set the date at 2015. As of June 2008, NASA has postponed the launch date "indefinitely".

A May 2005 NASA operating plan put the mission into a replanning phase through the spring of 2006. The launch was planned to be via an Evolved Expendable Launch Vehicle (EELV), likely an Atlas V 521 or equivalent.

=== Budget ===
SIM Lite was to be considered the flagship mission of NASA's Exoplanet Exploration Program (formerly known as the Navigator Program). According to the 2007 Presidential Budget for NASA, the program is, "a coherent series of increasingly challenging projects, each complementary to the others and each mission building on the results and capabilities of those that preceded it as NASA searches for habitable planets outside of the Solar System." The program, in addition to the Space Interferometry Mission, includes the Keck Interferometer and the Large Binocular Telescope Interferometer. When originally approved in 1996, the mission was given a $700 million cap (in 1996 dollars) which included launch costs and five years of operation. The first contracts, for the preliminary architecture study, were worth $200,000 each.

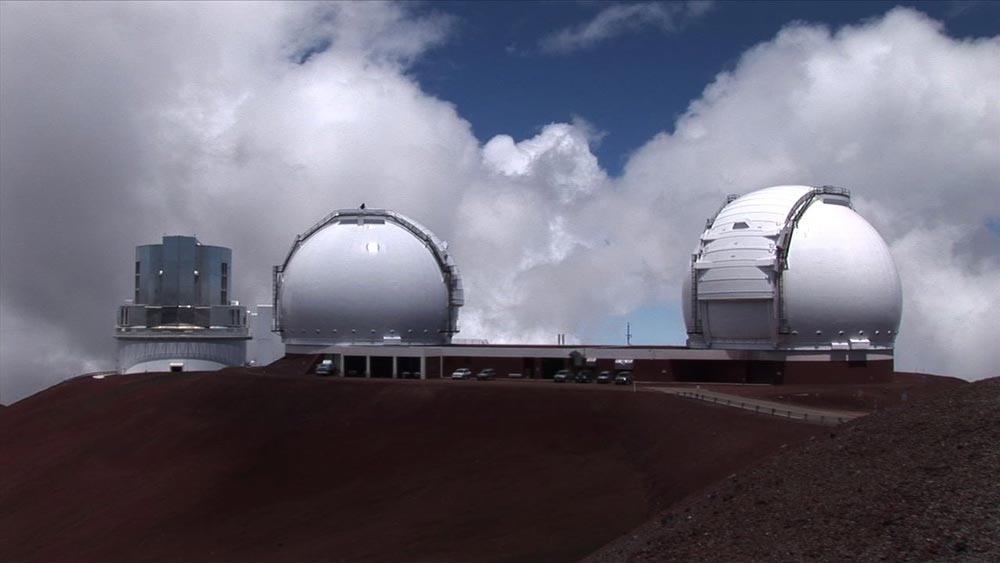
The telescopes at the Keck Observatory are used as the Keck Interferometer, another of NASA's Exoplanet Exploration programs to suffer budget cuts in 2007.

NASA's budget outlined plans for the three projects for fiscal year (FY) 2007. Of the three missions, SIM Lite was delayed further and the Keck Interferometer saw budget cuts. The 2007 NASA budget stipulated, "SIM Phase B activity will continue while new cost and schedule plans are developed, consistent with recent funding decisions." The funding decisions included a US$118.5 million cut over the FY 2006 NASA budget request for the Exoplanet Exploration Program. The budget also laid out projections for the program through the year 2010. Each year will have successive funding cuts, if compared to the 2006 request numbers. Starting with FY 2008, the Exoplanet Exploration Program will receive around $223.9 million less compared to 2006. The following years will have cuts of $155.2 million in 2009 and $172.5 million in 2010, compared to the 2006 request.

When SIM Lite entered what JPL terms "Phase B" in 2003 Fringes: Space Interferometry Mission Newsletter, called it a most important milestone on the way to a 2009 launch. The delays are budgetary in nature. In 2006, the mission received $117 million, an increase of $8.1 million over the previous year, but 2007 cuts amounted to $47.9 million less for the SIM program. In 2008, $128.7 million of the $223.9 million estimated to be cut from the Exoplanet Program budget would come from the SIM Lite mission. After an additional $51.9 million decrease in FY 2009, the program was reduced to $6 million in FY 2010 supplemented by substantial carryover from the previous year while awaiting the results of the Astronomy and Astrophysics Decadal Survey, Astro2010.

By February 2007 many of the budget cuts outlined in the FY 2007 budget were already being felt within the project. Engineers who worked on SIM were forced to find other areas to work in. A February 2007 editorial in the Space Interferometry Mission Newsletter described the situation as, "entirely due to budget pressures and priorities within the Science Mission Directorate at NASA (with) scientific motivation for the mission...as strong as ever." NASA, per the budget cuts, directed the SIM project to refocus its efforts toward engineering risk reduction. As of the February 2007 newsletter the plans for the refocus were in the process of being completed.

== Instruments ==
=== Optical interferometry ===
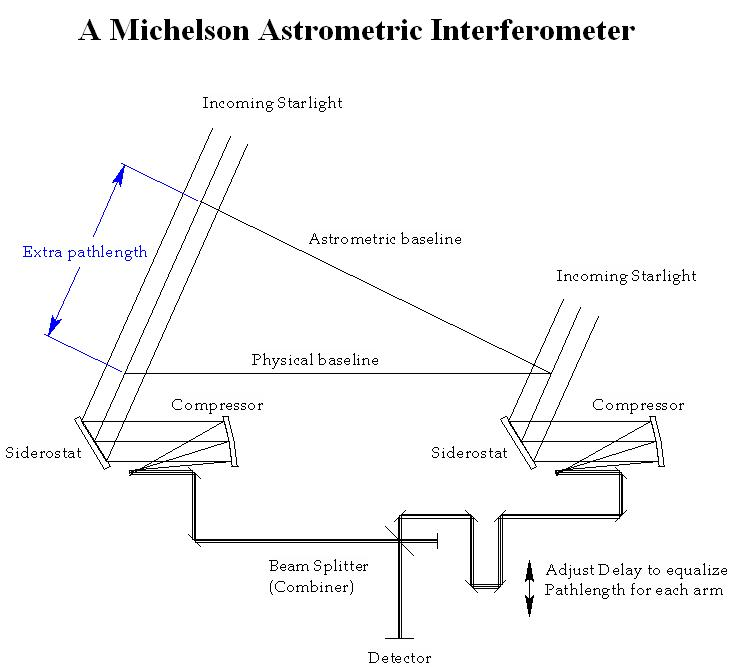
How the Astrometric Interferometer works

Interferometry is a technique pioneered by Albert A. Michelson in the 19th century. Optical interferometry, which has matured within the last two decades, combines the light of multiple telescopes so that precise measurements can be made, akin to what might be accomplished with a single, much larger telescope. It is the interaction of light waves, called interference, that makes this possible. Interference can be used to cancel out the glare of bright stars or to measure distances and angles accurately. The construction of the word partially illustrates this: interfere + measure = interfer-o-metry. At radio wavelengths of the electromagnetic spectrum, interferometry has been used for more than 50 years to measure the structure of distant galaxies.

The SIM Lite telescope functions through optical interferometry. SIM was to be composed of one science interferometer (50 cm collectors, 6 m separation [baseline]), a guide interferometer (30 cm collectors, 4.2 m baseline), and a guide telescope (30 cm aperture). The sophisticated guide telescope stabilizes instrument pointing in the third dimension. The spacecraft's operational limiting magnitude would have gone down to 20 at 20 millionths of an arcsecond (μas) and its planet-finding, astrometric accuracy of 1.12 μas is for single measurements. The accuracy of its global, all-sky astrometric grid would have been 4 μas.

SIM's design since 2000 consisted of two light collectors (strictly speaking, they are Mersenne telescopes) mounted on opposite ends of a six-meter structure. The observatory would have been able to measure the small wobbles in stars and detect the planets causing them down to one Earth mass at distances up to 33 light years (10 parsecs) from the Sun.

== See also ==
- NASA's PlanetQuest – Education and public outreach program of NASA
- List of NASA cancellations
