= McIDAS =

Weather forecasting tool

- Developer: University of Wisconsin–Madison
- Release: June 1972
- Website: www.ssec.wisc.edu/mcidas/

McIDAS, the "Man computer Interactive Data Access System", is a weather forecasting tool developed at the University of Wisconsin–Madison in the 1970s and used continually to this day. In its early incarnations, it was widely used to generate graphics for television stations, but today is used primarily by the NOAA and related agencies. Users of the McIDAS system developed a similar version for microcomputers and sold by ColorGraphics Weather Systems that generated much of the computerized weather imagery seen on television in the US in the 1980s.

== History ==
=== Applications Technology Satellite (ATS) ===
In 1953 Verner Suomi measured the heat budget of a corn field for his doctoral thesis at the University of Chicago. For the rest of his professional career he worked in the field of remote measuring using radiometers, often working with Robert Parent. They developed a remote sensing radiometer with the intent of flying it into space and measuring the heat budget of the Earth. Their first attempt was fitted to Vanguard TV3, but this exploded on launch. A similar experiment flew on Explorer 7 in 1959. This experiment demonstrated the impact of cloud cover on the heat balance of the Earth.

To further develop the field of satellite-based meteorology, NASA and National Science Foundation (NSF) grants led to the creation of the Space Science and Engineering Center (SSEC) at the University of Wisconsin–Madison. At the SSEC, Suomi and Parent developed the Spin Scan Cloudcover Camera (SSCC) to accurately measure and map cloud cover. The SSCC imaged a single strip of the Earth at a time, feeding out its information directly to a radio for broadcast to the ground. Fixed to the body of a rotating satellite, the SSCC would build up a 2D image as the satellite spun and rotated in its orbit.

SSCC was launched on ATS-1 on 6 December 1966. On 5 November 1967 ATS-3 launched the Multicolor Spin Scan Cloudcover Camera, which provided the first color meteorological imaging. Data from these instruments was captured on realtime printouts, and required manual work to cut and paste the successive strips into a single image, and then into multiple time-lapse images. Although a number of advances were made while examining this data, the work was tedious and time consuming.

=== WINDCO ===
In order to speed up the process of examining the data, Suomi started an internal competition to develop an automated solution. Two teams were set up, one developing an analog solution and another using software. The software solution, by Smith and Phillips, was able to demonstrate the ability to calculate wind speed and direction based solely on the images of the clouds. Based on this success, Suomi was able to gain additional funding from NASA and the NSF to develop a prototype all-computerized image processing system.

Known as WINDCO, the system consisted of a video disk for storing imagery and a Raytheon 440 minicomputer controlling it. The computer was used to record the imagery from the satellites, buffering a single frame from the strips and then storing it out along with timing information. The user interacted with the resulting video to select points on the frames that represented the same point as it moved over time, the output of their selections being punched to paper tape. The paper tape was then read by the 440 and copied onto punched cards containing instructions for the UNIVAC 1108 mainframe, which converted them into a vector map overlaid on top of a map of the Earth.

At a demonstration to NOAA, NASA and NSF on 12 April 1972, the system demonstrated the ability to generate 1000 wind vectors per hour. The attendees were impressed, but noted that the system was unable to correlate data from the satellites, which originated in a very specific format, with data being collected from other sensors, like automated weather stations. They encouraged the SSEC team to continue development, make the system even more automated, and include the ability to combine data from any source.

=== McIDAS ===
The biggest problem in developing a fully automated solution was finding a machine within their budget with the speed and storage capabilities required. The team eventually settled on a Datacraft/5 computer equipped with 96 kB of core memory and two 5 MB hard drives, one fixed, one removable. The new software, McIDAS, was much more automated, with the user's primary role in the data acquisition phase reduced to checking the quality of the vectors being automatically generated by the software. An image enhancement system was added to help see the clouds in low-light areas.

McIDAS accepted data from a number of sources. Cloud imagery was buffered on tape and then fed in as needed, data from the Synchronous Meteorological Satellite could be fed in directly from a satellite feed at 1.7 MB a second, FAA data at 75 bit/s, or National Weather Service radar at 1200 bit/s. All of this data could be overlaid on hand-drawn vector maps. The system was later extended to support data from the Earth Resources Technology Satellite and the Mariner planetary probes. A command line interpreter allowed the user to call up data with short commands, YK T 500 1200 USA would generate a display of the 500 mb temperature data from the 1200 UTC measurements over the USA.

The first McIDAS system was complete in June 1972, but tuning continued for several months. In October 1973 a real-time feed from McIDAS to the local WHA-TV state public television service was installed. Upgrades and new data feeds continued to be added; local weather radar maps, feeds for the newer generation GOES satellites and others were added by 1976. Demand for the system was so high that the system had to be upgraded several times for additional performance and storage, with 24-hour scheduling for workstations. A system was later installed at the US Air Force Cambridge Research Laboratory.

Continued demand resulted in the creation of a second-generation version of McIDAS based on six Harris/6 computers connected together using a custom networking system they called "burn lines". Two of the machines acted as database servers with 300 MB disk drives, while the other four supported up to 18 workstations each with 80 MB drives. Remote terminals inside the University were set up over 9600 bit/s lines, and later another was set up at the National Environmental Satellite Service center in Kansas City, where data from the Landsat series was processed. After a tornado in Wichita Falls, Texas killed several people in 1979, Congress directed that a new McIDAS be set up at the National Severe Storms Forecast Center (now known as the Storm Prediction Center), which was completed in January 1981.

The West German Space Agency started the task of converting McIDAS to an Amdahl mainframe in 1976, and a similar system was later installed at NASA's Goddard Space Flight Center. Newer versions were written for the IBM System/370 and IBM 4331. With the improved performance these machines offered, the distributed architecture of the second-generation McIDAS was no longer needed and systems returned to a single-server installation. In 1984 development started on a standalone version for the IBM PC using EGA or VGA graphics, first on DOS and later on OS/2. These versions spread McIDAS beyond the university and laboratory, and users were soon found at television stations and weather prediction agencies around the world.

A fourth-generation system, the current version, was built on Unix. This started in 1989 as a McIDAS environment for Vis5D. In 1993 that McIDAS was the basis for development of a supported version using X, which was released in 1996 as McIDAS-X. With standardized networking, the Unix version allowed low-cost terminals to be attached to the Unix workstations, and client versions for OS/2 and Windows NT were developed. As of December 2009, McIDAS-X is tested and supported by SSEC on AIX, Enterprise Linux, HP-UX, IRIX, Mac OS X, Solaris, and Windows XP workstations.

The fifth generation of McIDAS is actively being developed. This new package, named McIDAS-V, is a free, open source visualization and data analysis tool that displays weather satellite (including hyperspectral) and other geophysical data in 2- and 3-dimensions. McIDAS-V can also analyze and manipulate the data with its powerful mathematical functions. McIDAS-V is built on SSEC's VisAD and Unidata's Integrated Data Viewer libraries, and contains "Bridge" software that enables McIDAS-X users to run their commands and tasks in the McIDAS-V environment. The functionality of SSEC's HYDRA software package is also being integrated into McIDAS-V for viewing and analyzing hyperspectral satellite data.
