= Bill Hibbard =

American computer scientist

Hibbard presenting at the 2008 conference on artificial general intelligence

Bill Hibbard is a scientist at the University of Wisconsin–Madison Space Science and Engineering Center working on visualization and machine intelligence. He is principal author of the Vis5D, Cave5D, and VisAD open-source visualization systems. Vis5D was the first system to produce fully interactive animated 3D displays of time-dynamic volumetric data sets and the first open-source 3D visualization system.

== Writings on artificial intelligence ==
Bill Hibbard is also author of the book Super-Intelligent Machines and several articles about the technological singularity.

The ideas from Hibbard's book were refined in 2008. Hibbard published a series of three papers in 2012 on technical AI risk. One of these papers won the Singularity Institute's 2012 Turing Prize for the Best AGI Safety Paper.

His 2014 book, Ethical Artificial Intelligence, brings together all his ideas about AI.

His 2018 talk on PBS presents some of his ideas for a general audience.
