= Louis J. Lanzerotti =

American physicist (born 1938)

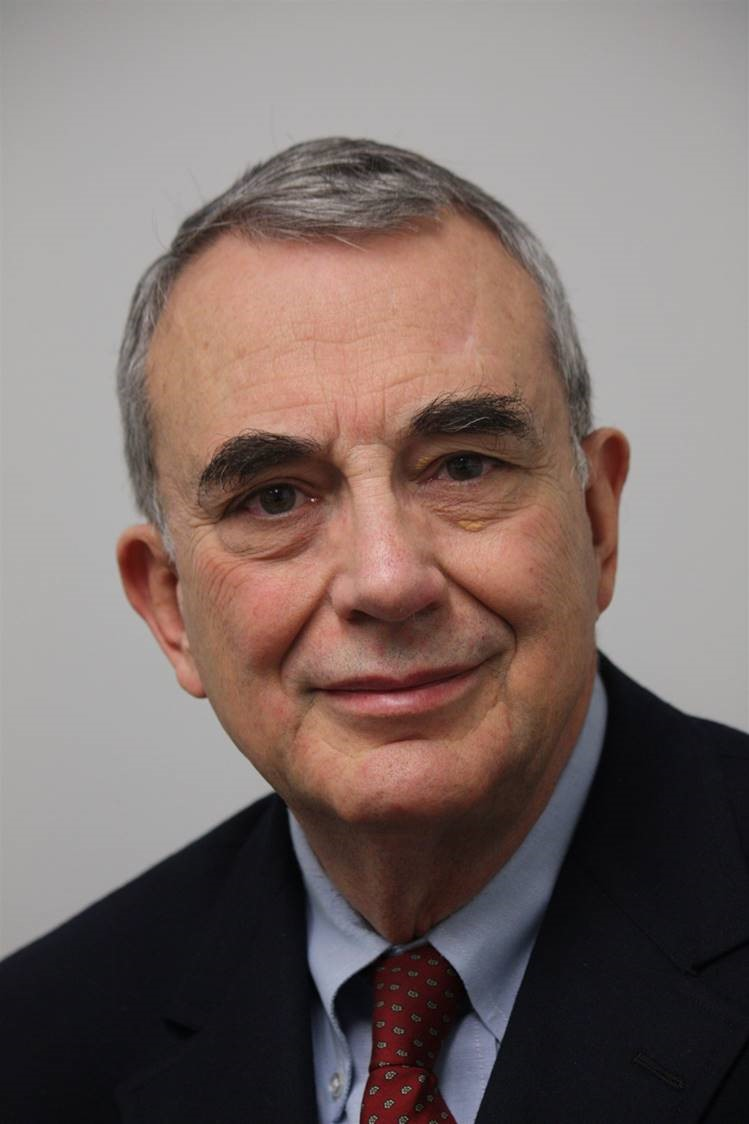
- Born: April 16, 1938; Carlinville, Illinois, US
- Education: University of Illinois Urbana-Champaign; Harvard University
- Scientific career
- Fields: physics

Louis John Lanzerotti (born April 16, 1938) is an American physicist. He is a Distinguished Research Professor of physics in the Center for Solar-Terrestrial Research at New Jersey Institute of Technology (NJIT) in Newark, New Jersey.

His principal research interests have included space plasmas, geophysics, and engineering problems related to the impacts of atmospheric and space processes and the space environment on space and terrestrial technologies.

== Early life ==
Louis J. Lanzerotti was born and grew up in Carlinville, Illinois. He earned a BS in Engineering Physics in 1960 from University of Illinois Urbana-Champaign. He obtained his MS and PhD degrees, both in Physics, and both from Harvard University in 1963 and 1965 respectively.

== Career ==
After serving as a postdoctoral fellow at Harvard University, he joined AT&T's Bell Laboratories in 1965 to engage in engineering and scientific research on Earth's radiation belts, the existence of which was confirmed a few years earlier by James Van Allen. AT&T's Telstar satellites had recently been launched, providing Lanzerotti and his colleagues with data for analyzing and interpreting the radiation belts and their effects of radiation on space systems. This marked the beginning of Lanzerotti’s leadership in the field now called "space weather". Lanzerotti's work led to him being named a Distinguished Member of Technical Staff at Lucent Technologies.

Lanzerotti worked with multiple satellite programs and space missions, including the ATS-1 and ATS-3 communications satellites, the interplanetary IMP 4 and IMP 5 explorer missions, the Voyager missions to the outer planets and interstellar medium, the Advanced Composition Explorer solar wind mission, and the Cassini mission to Saturn. Furthermore, Lanzerotti has been awarded many National Science Foundation research grants including as the principal investigator for instruments aboard the Ulysses mission over the poles of the Sun, the Galileo mission to Jupiter, and more recently the Van Allen Probes, launched in 2012 to study Earth's radiation belts. He retired in 2002 and remained a consultant to Alcatel-Lucent through 2008. In 2002, he was appointed a Distinguished Research Professor of Physics in the Center for Solar-Terrestrial Research at the New Jersey Institute of Technology in Newark, New Jersey. He has also served as an adjunct professor of electrical engineering at the University of Florida and as a Regents' lecture at University of California, Los Angeles. He is currently Distinguished Research Professor of Physics at the New Jersey Institute of Technology.

Much of his research has involved close collaborations with telecommunications service providers on commercial satellite and long-haul (principally transoceanic) cables. His research has also involved geomagnetism, solid earth geophysics, and some oceanography. This research has been applied to design and operations of systems associated with spacecraft and cable operations. Lanzerotti has served as principal investigator or co-investigator on several United States NASA interplanetary and planetary missions including ATS-1&3, IMP-4&5, Voyager 1&2, Ulysses, Galileo Orbiter and Entry Probe, ACE, and Cassini. Currently, he is a Principal Investigator with instruments on each of the two spacecraft in the NASA Van Allen Probes mission launched August 2012. He has also conducted geophysical research in the Antarctic and the Arctic beginning in the 1970s, directed largely toward understanding of Earth's upper atmosphere and space environments.

Lanzerotti has served as an associate editor for the Journal of Geophysical Research and is the founding editor of the online journal Space Weather.

In recognition of his career as a research scientist and engineer, Lanzerotti was appointed by US President George W. Bush to the National Science Board, the 24-member governing body of the National Science Foundation (NSF) and served a 6-year term from 2004 to 2010. He served on the board as a Board Consultant from May 2010 until April 2012. Lanzerotti also led a 12-member panel organized by the National Research Council (NRC) of the National Academies to identify possible causes of unintended acceleration in vehicles in the aftermath of Toyota's large automobile recalls.

Lanzerotti has authored or co-authored of more than 500 refereed publications, contributing to research that includes studies of space plasmas and geophysics, and engineering problems related to the impact of atmospheric and space processes (a.k.a. "space weather") on terrestrial and spaceborne technologies. Lanzerotti co-authored a book on radiation belt physics and has co-edited four books. He has eight patents issued or filed.

In addition to his career in science, Lanzerotti served in the Harding Township, New Jersey local government. In the 1980s he was elected to three 3-year terms on his Harding Township school board, with 6 years as chair of its curriculum committee and 6 years as vice president. Since 1993 he has served six elected terms on the township governing body, including 3 years as mayor.

== Awards and honors ==
- Member of National Academy of Engineering (NAE)
  - Recipient of the NAE Arthur E. Bueche Award (2017)
- Fellow of American Geophysical Union (AGU)
  - AGU Van Allen Lecture (2005)
  - AGU William Bowie Medal (2011)
  - AGU William Kaula Award (2016)
- Fellow of Institute of Electrical and Electronics Engineers (IEEE)
- Fellow of American Institute of Aeronautics and Astronautics (AIAA)
  - AIAA James A. Van Allen Space Environments Award (2020)
- Fellow of American Association for the Advancement of Science (AAAS)
- Fellow of American Physical Society (APS)
- Member of International Academy of Astronautics (IAA)
  - IAA Basic Science Award (2012)
- Recipient of NASA Distinguished Public Service Medal (1988 & 1994)
- Recipient of NASA Distinguished Scientific Achievement Medal (1996)
- Recipient of NASA Silver Achievement Medal (Voyager Medal)
- Recipient of Innovators Award, New Jersey Inventors Hall of Fame
- Recipient of Antarctica Service Medal
- Recipient of Committee on Space Research (COSPAR)'s William Nordberg Medal
- Mount Lanzerotti (coordinates 74° 50’ S|71° 33' W) is named for Professor Lanzerotti and rises to about 1,550 m in Ellsworth Land in the northernmost region of the Sky-Hi Nunataks Range of Antarctica.
- Minor Planet 5504 Lanzerotti was named after him in 2004

== Service activities ==
- Member NASA Physical Sciences Committee 1974-1980
- Chair National Academies of Sciences, Engineering, and Medicine (NASEM) Committee on Solar and Space Physics 1981-1983
- Chair NASA Space and Earth Science Advisory Committee 1984-1988
- Chair NASEM Space Studies Board 1988-1994
- Member NASA Advisory Council 1984-1994
- Vice President COSPAR 1994-2002
- Chair NASEM Decadal Study Solar and Space Physics 2001-2004
- Chair AGU Committee on Public Affairs
- Founding Editor, AGU journal Space Weather 2003-2014
- Chair Committee to Assess National Space Weather Program 2004-2006
- Chair Governing Board, American Institute of Physics 2007-2015
- Chair Board of Managers, AIP Publishing 2012-2015
- Member Board of Trustees, University Space Research Association 2017-

Member or Chair ~ 40 committees of NASEM (including examples below) 1979-

- Chair Committee on Antarctic Science and Policy 1992-1993
- Chair NAE Committee on Membership 1998-1999
- Chair Committee Assessing Options to Extend Life Hubble Telescope 2004-2005
- Chair Committee Electronic Vehicle Control and Unintended Acceleration 2010-2012
- Member Report Review Committee 2000-2006, 2011-2014
- Chair Committee DoT Testing Electronically Controlled Pneumatic Brakes 2016-2017
- National Science Board (Presidential Appointment, Senate Confirmed) 2004-2010
  - Chair Committee on Science and Engineering Indicators 2006-2010
  - Consultant 2010-2012
- Harding Township, New Jersey School Board (elected) 1982-1990
  - Vice President 1984-1990
- Harding Township, New Jersey committee (elected) 1993-2014
  - Mayor 2007-2009, 2013

== Personal life ==
Louis Lanzerotti married Mary Yvonne DeWolf Lanzerotti, Ph.D., on June 19, 1965, in St. Paul's Church, Cambridge, Massachusetts. They have two children, Mary Yvonne Lanzerotti, Ph.D. and Louis DeWolf Lanzerotti, Ph.D.
