= Gravity-gradient stabilization =

Method for the stabilization and the orientation of various spacecraft

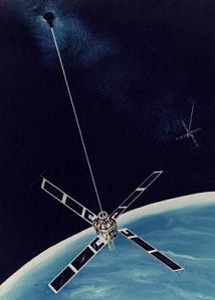
Transit-O (Operational) navigation satellite with a gravity boom

Gravity-gradient stabilization or tidal stabilization is a passive method of stabilizing artificial satellites or space tethers in a fixed orientation using only the mass distribution of the orbited body and the gravitational field. The main advantage over using active stabilization with propellants, gyroscopes or reaction wheels is the low use of power and resources. It can also reduce or prevent the risk of propellant contamination of sensitive components.

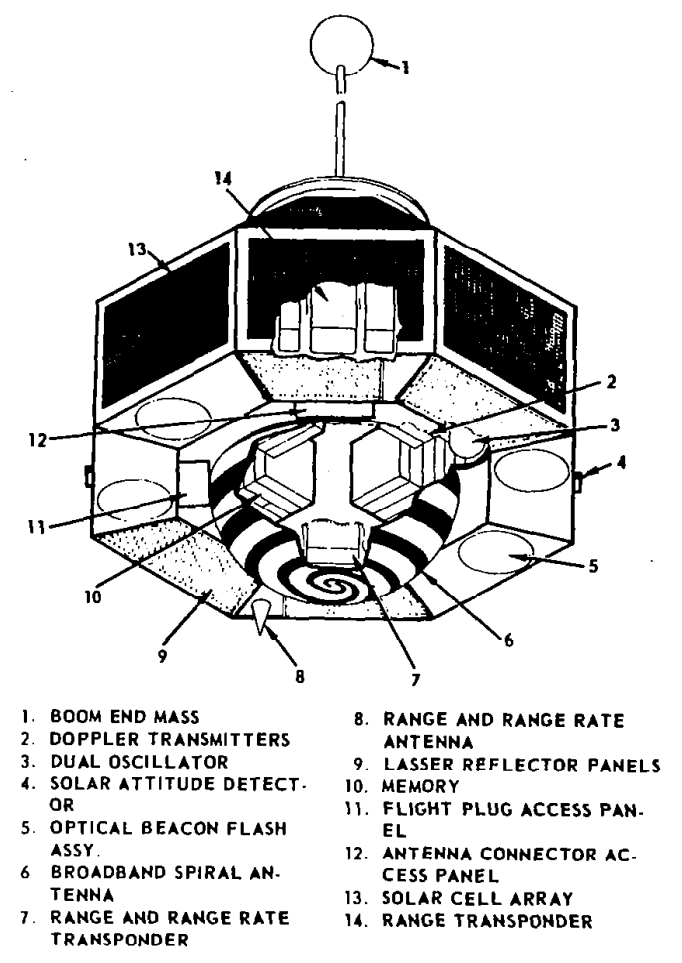
The design of the GEOS-A satellite allowed for gravity-gradient stabilization with a mass attached to a boom.

The technique exploits the Earth's gravitational field and tidal forces to keep the spacecraft aligned along the desired orientation. The gravity of the Earth decreases according to the inverse-square law, and by extending the long axis perpendicular to the orbit, the "lower" part of the orbiting structure will be more attracted to the Earth. The effect is that the satellite will tend to align its axis of minimum moment of inertia vertically.

== Early satellite usage ==
GGSE-1, launched in 1964, was a low Earth orbit satellite equipped with a passive oscillatory damping mechanism attached to the spacecraft via an 8.5 m (28 ft) rod of metal tape. The entire mechanism and rod together weighed less than 4.5 kg (9.9 lb). The damping mechanism, developed by General Electric, was a metal sphere, 12.7 cm (5.0 in) in diameter, containing another metal sphere with a silicone damping fluid between. A small bar magnet attached to the inner sphere aligned that sphere with the Earth's magnetic field. As the satellite oscillated about its local vertical because of gravity gradient forces, the outer sphere of the damper rotated about the inner sphere, dissipating the oscillatory energy in the form of heat from the viscous drag of the fluid. This system was more effective than the damping spring-and-weight system used on a previously launched Transit satellite in that it provided equal damping about all three axes of the satellite while the older damper provided no damping about the yaw axis and less damping of the roll axis than for pitch. The new damper also was effective immediately whereas the older technique required several weeks for the spring-mass to compress into operational position. GGSE-1 worked as hoped. Its stabilization system successfully oriented the satellite to a local vertical within 5° of accuracy and damped out oscillations within three days of orbit.

From 1966-69, gravity-gradient stabilization was tested in low Earth orbit on several satellites of the United States Air Force's OV-1 series with a system called Vertistat. Consisting of three 15.5 m (51 ft)-long horizontal booms forming a 'y' and two 19 m (62 ft)-long vertical booms, Vertistat was used unsuccessfully on OV1-7, OV1-86, and OV1-17, but successfully on OV1-10 (launched 11 December 1966).

Gravity-gradient stabilization for satellites was attempted but unsuccessful on the geosynchronous orbit Applications Technology Satellites ATS-2, ATS-4 and ATS-5 launched from 1966 until 1969. The Department of Defense Gravity Experiment (DODGE) satellite, launched July 1967, was the first successful use of the method in a near-geosynchronous orbit.

== Later satellite usage ==
The lunar orbiter Explorer 49 launched in 1973 was gravity gradient oriented (Z axis parallel to local vertical).

The Long Duration Exposure Facility (LDEF) used this method for 3-axis stabilization; yaw about the vertical axis was stabilized.

Gravity-gradient stabilization was attempted during NASA's TSS-1 mission in July 1992, but the project failed due to tether deployment problems. In 1996, another mission, TSS-1R, was attempted but failed when the tether broke. Just prior to tether separation, the tension in the tether was about 65 N (14.6 lbs).

== Crewed flight usage ==
The first attempt to use this technique in human spaceflight occurred on September 13, 1966 during the US Gemini 11 mission. The Gemini spacecraft was attached to the Agena target vehicle by a 100-foot (30 m) tether. The attempt was a failure, as insufficient gradient was produced to keep the tether taut.

On August 11, 1978, during the Soyuz 29 mission to Salyut 6, the station was put into gravity gradient stabilized flight for materials processing experiments with the Kristall and Splav furnaces.

== See also ==
- Gravity gradiometry, the study of gravitational variations
- Space tether, a cable connecting multiple bodies in space
- Tidal locking, another effect of tidal forces
- Magnetorquers, a supplementary stabilization technique
- Spacecraft detumbling
