= Bob Parent =

Bob Parent may refer to:

- Bob Parent (photographer) (1923–1987), Canadian-born photographer
- Bob Parent (ice hockey) (born 1958), retired ice hockey player
- Bob Parent (scientist), professor at University of Wisconsin-Madison
