= Robert Parent (scientist) =

American electrical engineer

Robert J. Parent
- Born: March 8th, 1917; Menominee, Wisconsin
- Died: June 23, 1978 (aged 61); Madison, Wisconsin
- Known for: Co-founder of SSEC, co-developer of the Spin-Scan Cloud Camera
- Scientific career
- Fields: Electrical engineering, satellite meteorology
- Institutions: University of Wisconsin–Madison

Robert J. Parent was an American electrical engineer and professor at the University of Wisconsin–Madison. He co-founded the Space Science and Engineering Center (SSEC) and worked alongside Verner E. Suomi to develop the spin-scan cloud camera, a technology utilized for early geostationary meteorological satellites.

== Academic career ==
Parent was a faculty member in the Department of Electrical Engineering at the University of Wisconsin–Madison. His academic work focused on the development of instrumentation for atmospheric and space research, collaborating with Suomi to design sensors for satellite missions.

== Scientific contributions ==
=== Explorer VII radiation experiment ===
In the late 1950s, Parent and Suomi designed a flat-plate radiometer to measure the Earth's radiation budget. The instrument was launched on the Explorer 7 satellite on October 13, 1959. The experiment provided early quantitative measurements of the Earth's solar absorption and infrared emission, contributing data to early climate models.

=== Space Science and Engineering Center ===
In 1965, Parent and Suomi co-founded the Space Science and Engineering Center (SSEC) at UW-Madison with funding from NASA and the National Science Foundation. The center was established to research the geophysical properties of the atmosphere and to construct satellite-based instrumentation.

=== Spin-scan cloud cameras (ATS-1 and ATS-3) ===
During the mid-1960s, Parent and Suomi designed camera systems that utilized the spin of geostationary satellites to capture images of the Earth. Prior to this, meteorological satellites in polar orbits could only capture narrow, non-continuous views. The spin-scan system used the 100-rpm rotation of the spacecraft to scan the Earth line-by-line, creating a full image of the disk in approximately 20 minutes.

- ATS-1 (1966): The Spin-Scan Cloud Camera (SSCC) was launched on NASA's ATS-1 satellite on December 6, 1966. It transmitted continuous black-and-white, full-disk images of Earth, which allowed researchers to calculate wind vectors and monitor weather patterns over time.
- ATS-3 (1967): Parent and Suomi developed the Multicolor Spin-Scan Cloudc Camera (MSSCC), which launched on the ATS-3 satellite on November 5, 1967. This instrument recorded images through red, green, and blue spectral bands, which were processed on the ground to create the first full-color image of the complete Earth disk on November 10, 1967. The color contrast provided clearer distinctions between ground surface, water, and cloud systems, and the design served as a baseline for the development of subsequent geostationary operational environmental satellites (GOES).

==== Historic satellite imagery ====
The following images were captured by the camera systems designed by Parent and Suomi:

Earth Imagery from ATS-1 and ATS-3

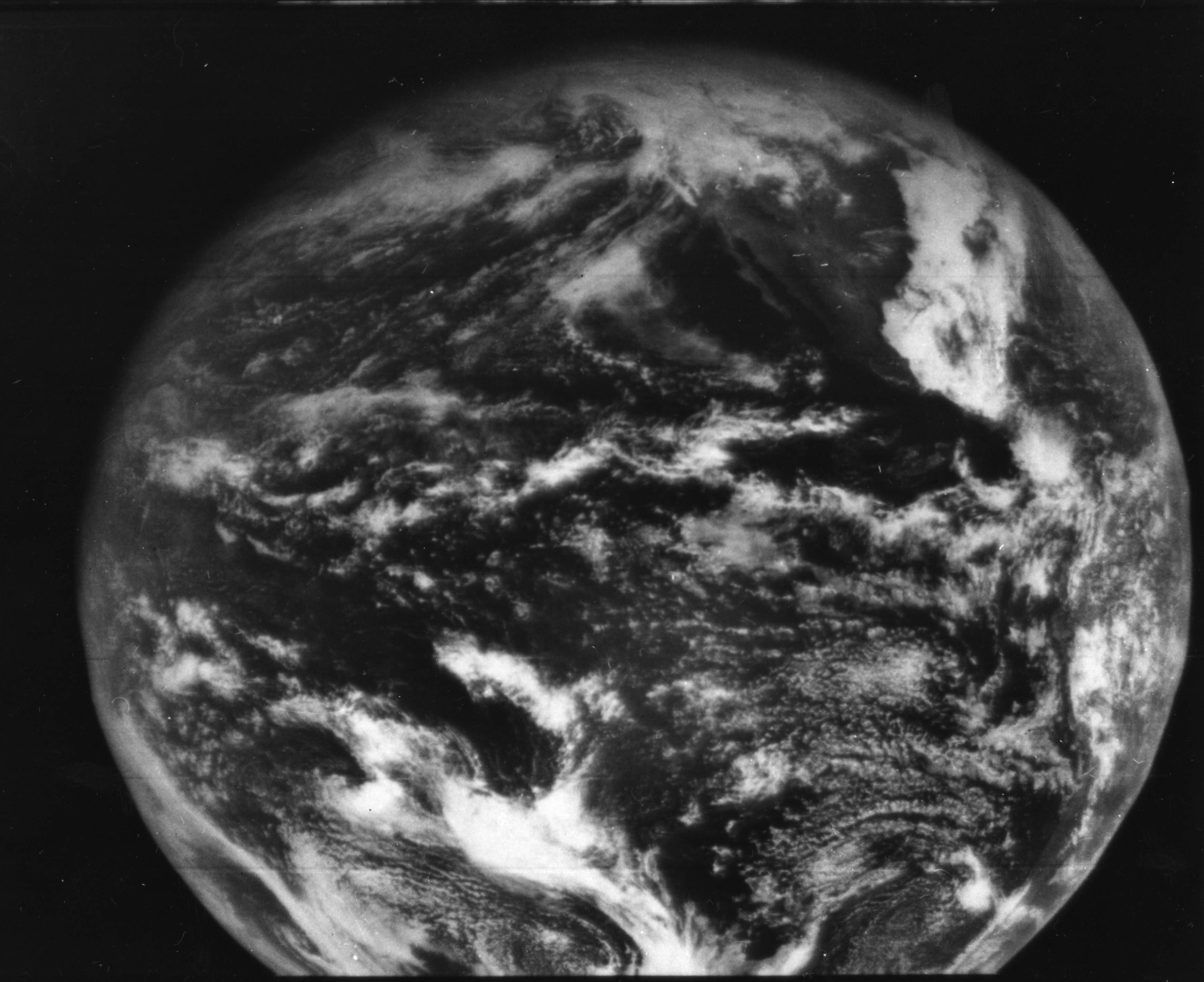
The first full-disk image of Earth captured from geostationary orbit by the ATS-1 Spin-Scan Cloud Camera on December 11, 1966.

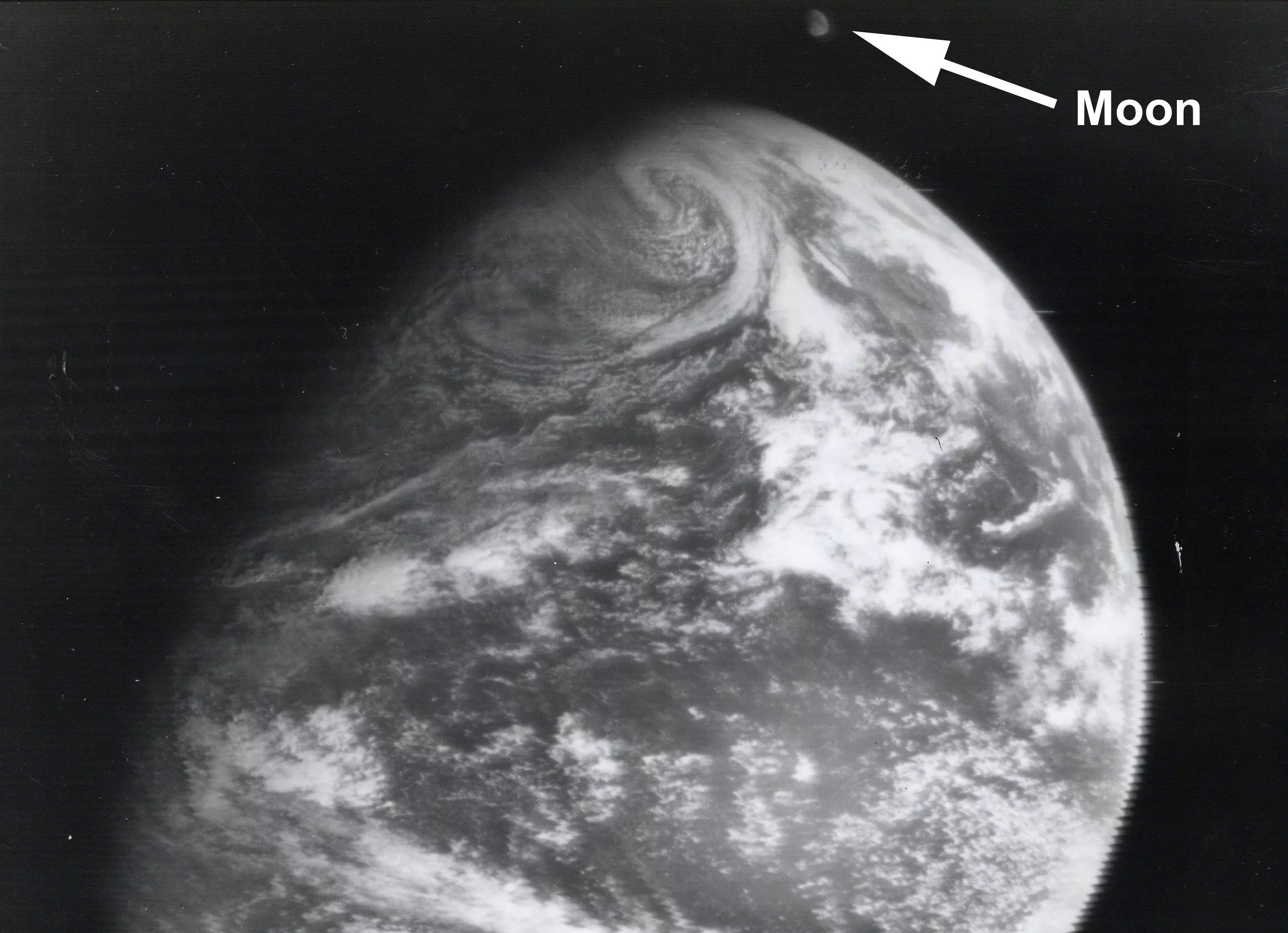
The first image depicting both the Earth and Moon together, captured by ATS-1 on December 11, 1966.

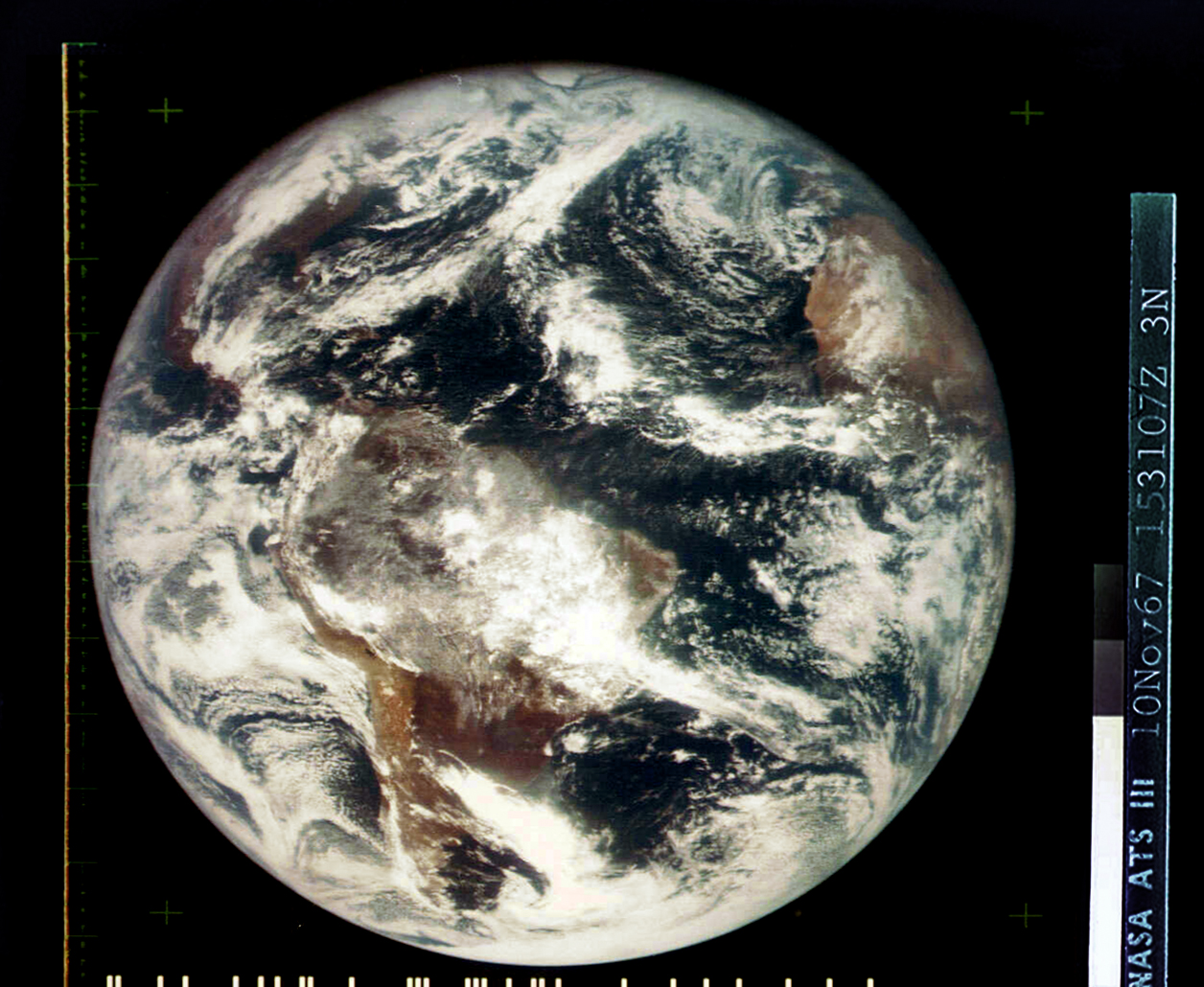
The first full-color image of the complete Earth disk, captured by the ATS-3 Multicolor Spin-Scan Cloud Camera on November 10, 1967.
