= Verner E. Suomi =

Finnish-American educator, inventor, and scientist

Verner Suomi
- (1985)
- Born: December 6, 1915; Eveleth, Minnesota, U.S.
- Died: July 30, 1995 (aged 79); Madison, Wisconsin, U.S.
- Education: University of Chicago (Ph.D., 1953)
- Known for: Satellite meteorology
- Awards: National Medal of Science (1976); Carl-Gustaf Rossby Research Medal
- Scientific career
- Fields: Meteorology
- Workplaces: University of Wisconsin–Madison
- Thesis: The Heat Budget Over a Cornfield (1953)

Verner Edward Suomi (December 6, 1915 – 30 July 1995) was a Finnish-American educator, inventor, and scientist. He is considered the father of satellite meteorology. He invented the Spin Scan Radiometer, which for many years was the instrument on the GOES weather satellites that generated the time sequences of cloud images seen on television weather shows. The Suomi NPP polar orbiting satellite, launched in 2011, was named in his honor.

== Early life ==
Suomi was born in Eveleth, Minnesota, to Swedish-speaking Finns John and Anna Suomi. His parents arrived in the United States in 1902 from the Åland Islands from Finland. (The family surname, Suomi, is of Finnish origin and means Finland in Finnish.) He was the sixth of seven children; he outlived all but two sisters, Esther and Edith. He received his first degree from Winona Teachers College (now Winona State University). He taught high school science. Later, he attended the University of Chicago, where he received his PhD in 1953.

== Career ==
By 1948, Suomi was among the earliest faculty members of the Department of Meteorology at the University of Wisconsin–Madison. Together with Robert Parent, in 1965, Suomi founded the Space Science and Engineering Center (SSEC) there. From this, came the first weather satellite to provide imagery from a geostationary orbit and was named the Applications Technology Satellite (ATS-1), launched on 6 December 1966, that included a Spin Scan Radiometer. The subsequent ATS-3, launched in November 1967, using a spin scan camera, made what would be known as the first color images of the whole earth.

Suomi led the development of McIDAS (Man-computer Interactive Data Access System) in 1972, displaying the images produced by his satellites such as SMS-1 in 1974.

A very popular professor, he formally retired from teaching in 1986.

A list of his publications is being curated at the University of Wisconsin

== Honors and awards ==
Suomi was elected to the National Academy of Engineering in 1966, elected to the American Philosophical Society in 1976, awarded the National Medal of Science and elected to the American Academy of Arts and Sciences in 1977, awarded the Franklin Medal in 1984, the Charles Franklin Brooks Award from the American Meteorological Society in 1980; a lifetime achievement award from the International Meteorological Organization, and numerous other awards and honors including the World Meteorological Organization's International Meteorological Organization Prize (the IMO Prize) and the first Walter Ahlstrom Prize. The American Meteorological Society established the Verner E. Suomi Technology Medal, in his honor. It is granted to individuals in recognition of highly significant technological achievement in the atmospheric or related oceanic and hydrologic sciences. The term "technological" is used here in the broadest sense; it encompasses the entire spectrum of instrumentation, as well as observational, measurement, data transmission, and data analysis and synthesis methodologies.

On January 24, 2012, NASA renamed a recently launched NPP Earth monitoring satellite after Dr. Suomi. On that occasion, John Grunsfeld, associate administrator of NASA's Science Mission Directorate, said that "Verner Suomi's many scientific and engineering contributions were fundamental to our current ability to learn about Earth's weather and climate from space." The Suomi NPP houses the VIIRS instrument that provided the images which were combined to make the 2012 The Blue Marble photo.

== Personal life ==
Suomi died in Madison, Wisconsin at age 79. He was survived by his wife Paula and his children Eric, Stephen, and Lois; two sisters, Edith and Esther; two granddaughters; and many nieces and nephews.
