= Space Science and Engineering Center =

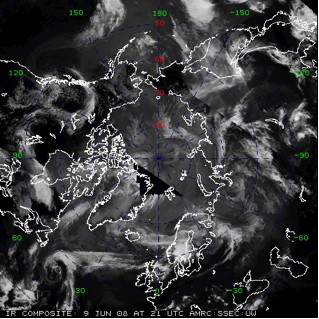
Infrared Arctic satellite composite image from the Center

The Space Science and Engineering Center (SSEC) is a research and development center with primary focus on Earth science research and technology to enhance understanding of the atmosphere of Earth, the other planets in the Solar System, and the cosmos. SSEC is part of the University of Wisconsin–Madison's Graduate School.

== Major SSEC initiatives ==
- Atmospheric studies of Earth and other planets
- Interactive computing, data access, and image processing
- Spaceflight hardware development and fabrication

== See also ==
- Cooperative Institute for Meteorological Satellite Studies (CIMSS)
- McIDAS
- Vis5D
- Cave5D
- VisAD
- National Environmental Satellite, Data and Information Service (NESDIS)
