= Cooperative Institute for Meteorological Satellite Studies =

US research institute

CIMSS Cooperative Institute for Meteorological Satellite Studies
- Established: 1980
- Budget: $10.8MM (FY2015)
- Field of research: Atmospheric sciences
- Director: Tristan L'Ecuyer
- Location: 1225 W. Dayton St., Madison, Wisconsin, 53706; 43.0707°N 89.4069°W
- Campus: University of Wisconsin–Madison
- Affiliations: NOAA, NASA
- Website: http://cimss.ssec.wisc.edu

The Cooperative Institute for Meteorological Satellite Studies (CIMSS) is a research institute where scientists study the use of data from geostationary and polar orbit weather satellites to improve forecasts of weather (including tropical cyclones and severe storms. CIMSS was formed through a Memorandum of Understanding between the University of Wisconsin–Madison, the National Oceanic and Atmospheric Administration (NOAA) and the National Aeronautics and Space Administration (NASA). CIMSS parent organization, the Space Science and Engineering Center (SSEC) is a primary developer and operator of environmental satellite technologies.

It is one of 16 NOAA Cooperative Institutes (CIs).

== Background ==
CIMSS develops and successfully implements techniques and products for using geostationary and polar-orbiting weather satellite visible and thermal radiation observations to improve forecasts of severe storms, including tornadoes and tropical cyclones. CIMSS plays a major role in the transfer of new technology into operational practice. CIMSS scientists conduct research using passive remote sensing systems for meteorological and surface-based applications.

CIMSS also plays a major role in instrument design and testing, and related software development for improved space-based measurements of the Earth's atmosphere. CIMSS is very active in national and international field programs, testing new instrumentation, data processing systems, and assessing the geophysical utility of measurements.

== Current research ==
Current research also focuses on the development and testing of computer-based analysis and forecast techniques that use observations from existing and planned spacecraft and ground-based weather observing systems as part of a national program to greatly improve weather forecast capabilities for the next decade. The optimal use of satellite data in climate and global change studies has become another essential part of the CIMSS mission.

CIMSS serves as an international center for research on the interpretation and uses of operational and experimental satellite observations and remote sensing data acquired from aircraft and the ground. These data are applied to a wide variety of atmospheric and oceanographic studies and evaluated for their potential operational utility. The CIMSS international role is further strengthened through its visiting scientist program that hosts sabbaticals for several foreign scholars each year.

== Staff ==
The CIMSS staff consists of over 100 associates, including administrative staff, principal investigators, federal employees stationed at CIMSS, scientific and programming staff, visiting scientists, and student hourly support. The federal employees consist of the 7 members of the NOAA Advanced Satellite Products Branch, 1 NOAA Office of Research and Applications employee, 1 NOAA Severe Storms Lab employee, and 1 NASA Langley Research Center employee.
