= DODGE =

Satellite

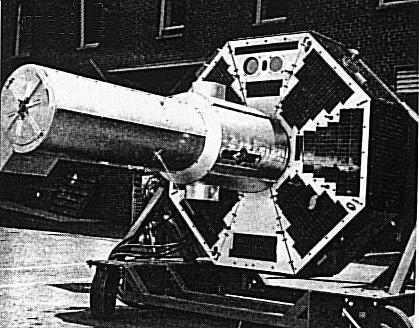
- The DODGE satellite
- Mission type: Technology
- Operator: NASA / USAF
- COSPAR ID: 1967-066F
- SATCAT no.: 2867
- Mission duration: 3 years

Spacecraft properties
- Manufacturer: Johns Hopkins University; Applied Physics Laboratory
- Launch mass: 200 kilograms (430 lb)
- Dimensions: 2.4 by 1.2 metres (7.9 by 4.0 ft)

Start of mission
- Launch date: July 1, 1967, 13:15:01 UTC
- Rocket: Titan IIIC
- Launch site: Cape Canaveral LC-41

Orbital parameters
- Reference system: Geocentric
- Regime: MEO
- Semi-major axis: 39,841.6 kilometres (24,756.4 mi)
- Perigee altitude: 33,278.8 kilometres (20,678.5 mi)
- Apogee altitude: 33,662.5 kilometres (20,916.9 mi)
- Inclination: 11.7 degrees

DODGE (Department of Defense Gravity Experiment) was a satellite whose primary purpose was to conduct experiments in gravity-gradient stabilization at near-geosynchronous altitudes. Its secondary objectives included measuring the Earth's magnetic field, and taking pictures of the entire Earth's disk in both black-and-white and color. It was launched atop a Titan IIIC rocket on July 1, 1967, and operated for over three years. DODGE carried ten knobbed booms oriented along three different axes, that could be independently extended and retracted by ground command.

DODGE first achieved successful stabilization 12 days after launch. It took in 1967 color-filtered black-and-white images, which put together produced the very first color image of the full-disk Earth (ATS-3 often also cited, produced the first non-black-and-white filtered "true-color" image).

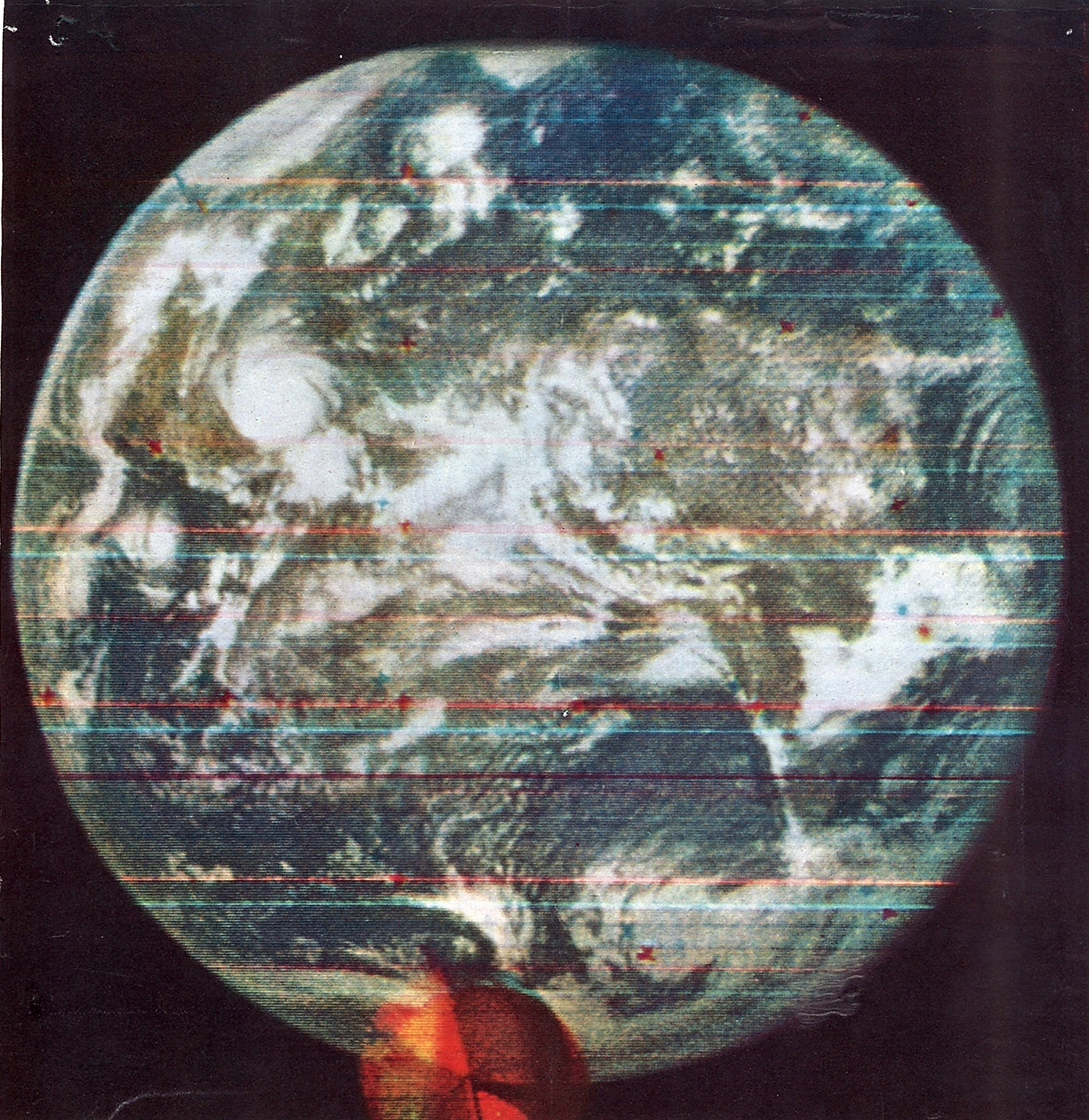
The first color image of the entire Earth, taken by the DODGE satellite in August, 1967

== See also ==
- ATS-3, another satellite also to take one of the first full-disk color pictures of the Earth
- First images of Earth from space

== See also ==
- Department of Defense
