= ATS-2 =

Communications satellite launched by NASA

ATS-2, Advanced Tech. Sat. 2, ATS-A, 02743
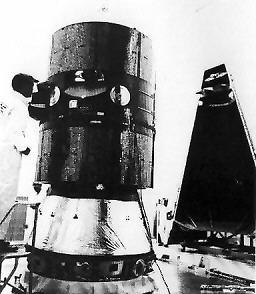
- The ATS-2.
- Mission type: Weather satellite
- Operator: NASA
- COSPAR ID: 1967-031A
- SATCAT no.: 02743

Spacecraft properties
- Bus: HS-306
- Manufacturer: Hughes Aircraft
- Launch mass: 324.3 kg (715 lb)

Start of mission
- Launch date: April 6, 1967, 03:21:00 UTC
- Rocket: Atlas Agena-D
- Launch site: Cape Canaveral LC-12

End of mission
- Decay date: September 2, 1969

Orbital parameters
- Reference system: Geocentric
- Regime: Highly Elliptical
- Eccentricity: 0.4548
- Perigee altitude: 178 km (111 mi)
- Apogee altitude: 11,124 km (6,912 mi)
- Inclination: 28.4º
- Period: 218.9 minutes

ATS-2 (Applications Technology Satellite) was a communications satellite launched by NASA on April 6, 1967, on an Atlas-Agena D rocket from Cape Canaveral.

== Objectives ==
The ATS-2 had the following objectives: test new concepts in spacecraft design, propulsion and stabilization; capture high quality images of cloud cover; collect data measurements in an aerospace environment; and test improved communication systems.

== Features ==
The satellite had a cylindrical shape with a 142 centimeters (56 in) diameter and a height of 183 cm (72 in). After including the motor cover, the satellite was about 360 cm (140 in) tall. The surface of the satellite was covered by solar panels, and it utilized gravity-gradient stabilization for control.

== Experiments ==
The following 12 experiments were conducted:

- Radio astronomy
- Magnetospheric electric fields
- Electron magnetic spectrometer deflection
- Particle telescope
- Omnidirectional proton and electron detectors
- Very low frequency (VLF) receiver
- Earth's albedo (DoD)
- Microwave communication transponder (Hughes Co.)
- Gravity-Gradient Stabilization (General Electric Co)
- Advanced Vidicon Camera System (AVCS)
- Thermal coating degradation
- Solar cell degradation

== Mission ==
The launch of ATS-2 went entirely according to plan up to the first Agena burn. When the second burn was initiated, the Agena engine failed to restart and thus the satellite could not be placed in the correct orbit. Postflight investigation found that the oxidizer isolation valve had failed to close after the first burn. This valve was supposed to prevent propellant from escaping the tanks and filling the turbopump during the coasting phase, but since it remained open, the pump developed vapor lock and thus it became impossible to pump oxidizer in. A small amount of impulse was generated by the gas generator igniter cartridge. The low periapsis of the orbit caused the satellite to tumble more than the stabilization system could compensate, which complicated its mission. The satellite still produced some usable data from the experiments, most notably those regarding cosmic rays and particles. It reentered the atmosphere on September 2, 1969.
