= Applications Technology Satellites =

Series of experimental satellites launched by NASA

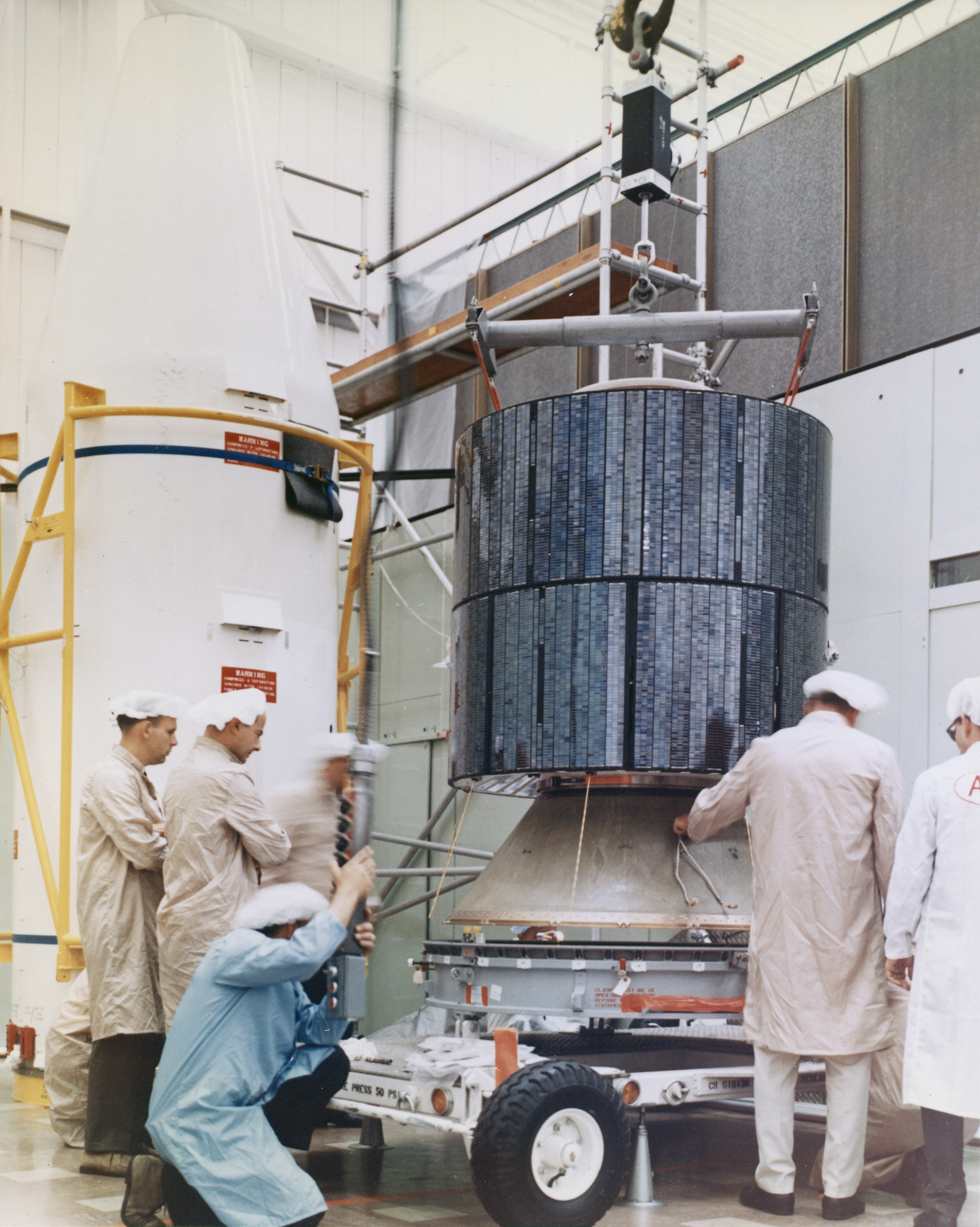
Technicians work with one of the Applications Technology Satellites in 1967

The Applications Technology Satellites (ATS) were a series of experimental satellites launched by NASA, under the supervision of, among others, Wernher von Braun. The program was launched in 1966 to test the feasibility of placing a satellite into geosynchronous orbit. The satellites were primarily designed to act as communication satellites, but also carried equipment related to meteorology and navigation. ATS-6 was the world's first educational satellite as well as world's first experimental Direct Broadcast Satellite (DBS) as part of the Satellite Instructional Television Experiment (SITE) between NASA and ISRO.

== Summary of missions ==
Mission	Launch Date	Duration	Major investigations	Notable mission highlights
ATS-1	December 7, 1966	18 years	Spin stabilization, investigated the geostationary environment, space communications	First full-Earth cloud cover images
ATS-2	April 6, 1967	6 months	None	Launch vehicle failure caused spacecraft to reach undesirable orbit. Limited data was obtained.
ATS-3	November 5, 1967	At least 20 years	Spin stabilization, communications tests	First color images from space. ATS-3 was also used as a communications satellite, providing links to Antarctica and the Pacific Basin
ATS-4	August 10, 1968	2 months in low orbit, failed to reach geostationary orbit, full mission did not occur	Intended (failed) objective of inserting a gravity-gradient-stabilized spacecraft into a geosynchronous orbit	Intended for geostationary orbit. Launch vehicle failure left it in a near useless LEO orbit. Little data was obtained.
ATS-5	August 12, 1969	3 year design life	Communications tests, intended (failed) testing of an ion engine	Spacecraft entered an unintended spin and encountered excessive acceleration. This caused damage to the ion engine.
ATS-6	May 30, 1974	5 years	Tested several communications technologies, satellite assisted search and rescue, and broadcast television.	First satellite to broadcast educational content.

== See also ==
- Geostationary Operational Environmental Satellite
- Synchronous Meteorological Satellite
