= ATS-5 =

NASA experimental satellite

ATS-5, Advanced Tech. Sat. 5, ATS-E, PL-69B, 04008
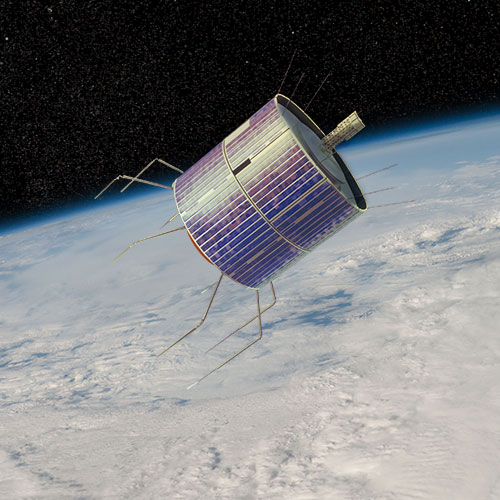
- NASA Applications Technology Satellite 5
- Mission type: Communications
- Operator: NASA
- COSPAR ID: 1969-069A
- SATCAT no.: 4068
- Mission duration: 3 years (planned); 14 years, 7 months (final)

Spacecraft properties
- Bus: HS-306
- Manufacturer: Hughes Aircraft
- Launch mass: 821 kg (1,810 lb)
- Dimensions: 1.8 m × 1.4 m × 1.4 m (5.9 ft × 4.6 ft × 4.6 ft)
- Power: 150 W

Start of mission
- Launch date: Aug 12, 1969 UTC
- Rocket: Atlas SLV-3C Centaur-D (AC-18)
- Launch site: Cape Canaveral LC-36A
- Contractor: Convair

End of mission
- Disposal: Decommissioned
- Deactivated: March 1984

Orbital parameters
- Reference system: Geocentric
- Regime: LEO
- Periapsis altitude: 35,992 kilometres (22,364 mi)
- Apoapsis altitude: 36,024 kilometres (22,384 mi)
- Inclination: 14.5º
- Period: 1,447.40 minutes

ATS-5 (Applications Technology Satellite-5) also known as ATS-E was a communications satellite launched into geosynchronous orbit on August 12, 1969. Built by Hughes Aircraft and launched by NASA, it was the final Hughes/NASA joint mission in the Applications Technology Satellites program.

== Objectives ==
The primary objective of ATS-5 was to evaluate gravity-gradient stabilization and demonstrate north-south station-keeping (NSSK) of a geosynchronous satellite. The experimental goals of ATS-5 included new imaging techniques for meteorological data retrieval, a demonstration of L band signals to precisely locate ships, tests of an electric ion thruster, evaluation of rain fade attenuation effects on RF signals, and C band communications tests for NASA and the National Science Foundation.

== Features ==
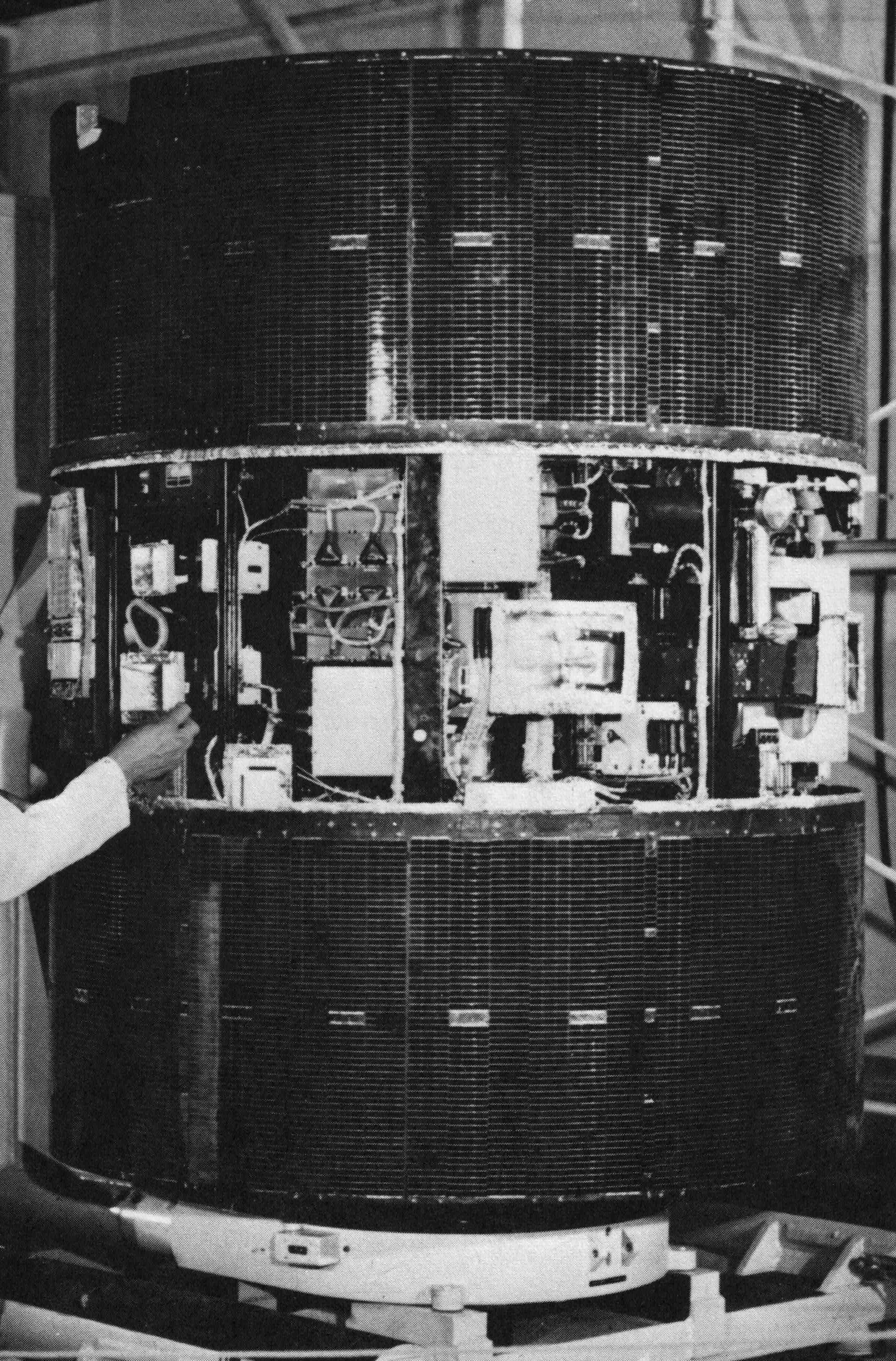
ATS-5 satellite

The spacecraft structure was made of aluminum. Drum mounted solar cells provided 150 W at beginning of life connected to two 6 Ah Nickel-cadmium batteries. AC-5 also had hydrazine (N2H4) thrusters, nitrogen (N2) cold gas thrusters, yo-yo despin, nutation control, and solar arrays cooled by heat pipes.

== Instruments ==
ATS-5 carried a magnetometer, ion engine (10E-5 lbf resistojet IPS), C-band communications package, millimeter wave propagation experiment, L-band communications experiment, and a gravity gradient stabilization system. The ion engine was identical to that used on ATS-4 the year prior.

== Mission ==
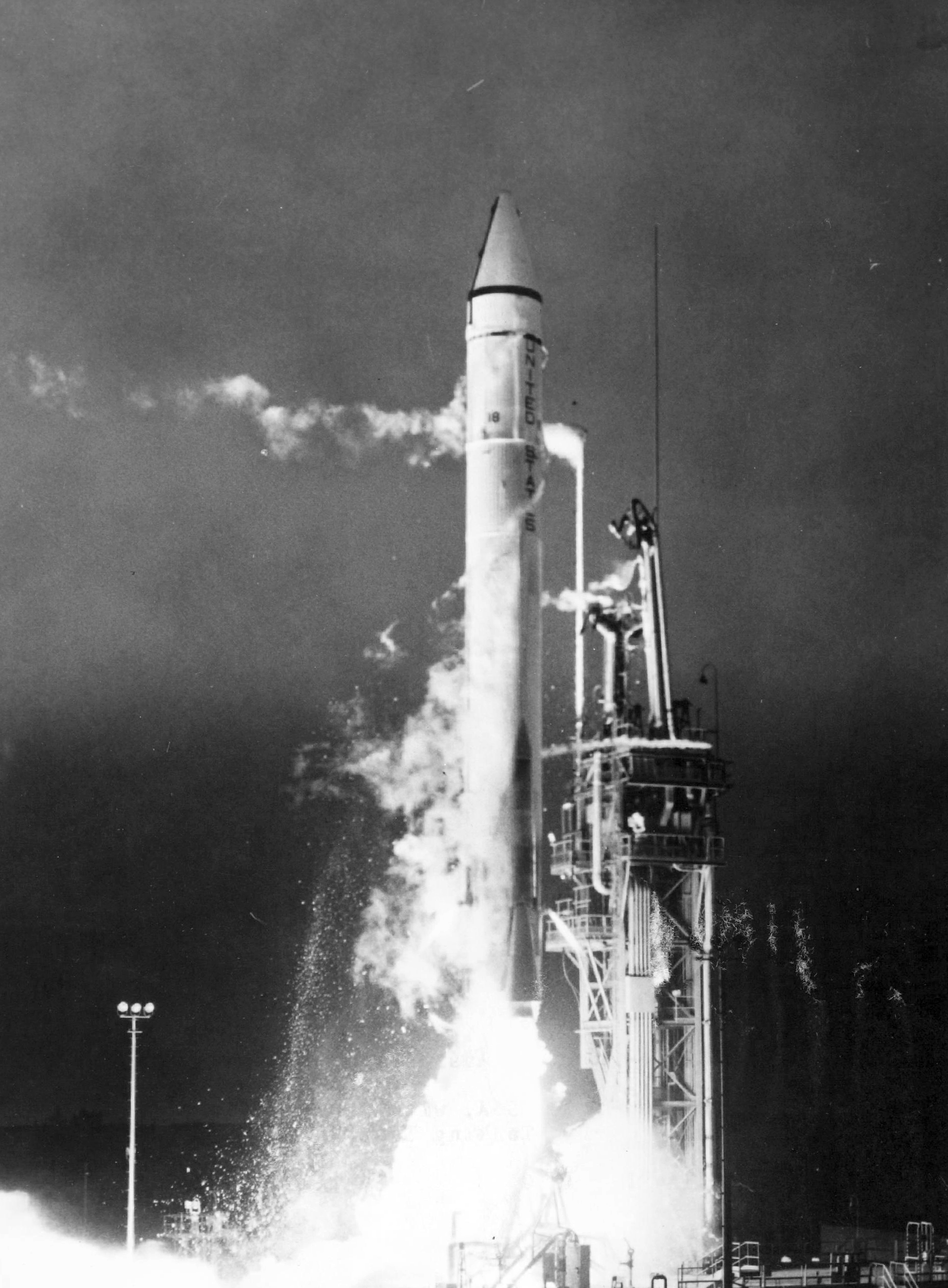
ATS-5 launch

ATS-5 was successfully launched in a near-perfect trajectory by Atlas-Centaur and inserted into geosynchronous orbit. Nine of the 13 experiments onboard the spacecraft returned useful data. However, following the firing of the satellite's apogee kick motor, ATS-5 went into an unplanned flat spin. Although control was restored and the satellite reached its destination over the equator (off the coast of Ecuador), the vehicle began spinning about the correct axis but in the opposite direction than planned. The counterclockwise spin prevented successful deployment of the 124-foot gravity gradient booms for the stabilization experiment.

Since the spacecraft could not be detumbled as planned, the spacecraft gravity gradient stabilization could not be implemented. The spin rate was roughly 76 revolutions per minute, causing an effective 4g acceleration on the cesium feed system that flooded the discharge chamber, preventing normal operation of the thruster with ion beam extraction. The IPS was able to be operated as a neutral plasma source, without high-voltage ion extraction, along with the wire neutralizer to examine spacecraft charging effects. The neutralizer was also operated by itself to provide electron injection for the spacecraft charging experiments.

Although some of the instrumentation on board functioned properly despite the wrong spin, the gravitational gradient and imagery acquisition experiments failed. WEFAX was still operational, although no images were transmitted.

The spacecraft was boosted above geostationary orbit at the end of its mission.

== See also ==
- 1969 in spaceflight
- Applications Technology Satellite
