= Integrated Data Viewer =

The Integrated Data Viewer (IDV) from Unidata/UCAR is a Java based software framework for analyzing and visualizing geoscience data. The IDV release includes a software library and a reference application made from that software. It uses the VisAD library and other Java-based utility packages.

The IDV is developed at the Unidata Program Center (UPC), part of the University Corporation for Atmospheric Research, Boulder, Colorado which is funded by the National Science Foundation. The software is freely available under the terms of the GNU Lesser General Public License.

== Bibliography ==
- D. Murray, J. McWhirter, S. Wier, S. Emmerson, The Integrated Data Viewer: A Web-enabled application for scientific analysis and visualization, Preprints, 19th Int. Conf. on Interactive Information and Processing Systems (IIPS) for Meteorology, Oceanography, and Hydrology, Long Beach, CA, Amer. Meteor. Soc., 13.2.
