= ATS-3 =

American experimental satellite

ATS-3, Advanced Tech. Sat. 3, ATS-C, 03029
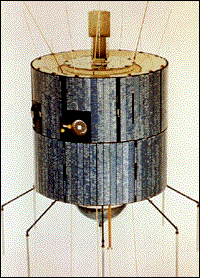
- ATS-3 prelaunch
- Mission type: Weather; Communications; Technology
- Operator: NASA
- COSPAR ID: 1967-111A
- SATCAT no.: 3029
- Mission duration: 34 years (final); 58 years, 9 months, 11 days (in orbit)

Spacecraft properties
- Bus: HS-306
- Manufacturer: Hughes
- Launch mass: 365.0 kilograms (804.7 lb)

Start of mission
- Launch date: November 5, 1967, 23:37:00 UTC
- Rocket: Atlas SLV-3 Agena-D
- Launch site: Cape Canaveral LC-12

End of mission
- Deactivated: 2001

Orbital parameters
- Reference system: Geocentric
- Regime: GSO
- Semi-major axis: 42,241.0 kilometres (26,247.3 mi)
- Eccentricity: 0.00043
- Perigee altitude: 35,723 kilometers (22,197 mi)
- Apogee altitude: 35,862 kilometers (22,284 mi)
- Inclination: 6.92 degrees
- Period: 23.93 hours
- Epoch: January 21, 2014, 11:54:19 UTC

Applications Technology Satellite 3, or ATS-3, was a long-lived American experimental geostationary weather and communications satellite, operated by NASA from 1967 to 2001. It was at one time reputed to be the oldest satellite still in operation. As of 1995, NASA referred to the ATS-3 as "The oldest active communications satellite by a wide margin."

On November 10, 1967, ATS-3 took NASA's first color photo (digital image mosaic) of the full-disk Earth, which was subsequently used on the cover of the first Whole Earth Catalog.

== History ==
Launched in November 1967, the ATS-3 was in service for 11 years before finally being decommissioned in 1978 along with ATS-1. Among its widest-known achievements are the first full-disk, "true color" composite Earth image (DODGE took color-filtered black-and-white images, put together they produced the very first color image of the full-disk). Its imaging capability has served during disaster situations.

ATS-3 experiments included VHF and C-band communications, a color spin-scan camera (principally developed by Verner E. Suomi), an image dissector camera, a mechanically despun antenna, resistojet thrusters, hydrazine propulsion, optical surface experiments, and the measurement of the electron content of the ionosphere and magnetosphere.

Because of failures in the hydrogen peroxide systems on ATS-1, ATS-3 was equipped with a hydrazine propulsion system. Its success led to its incorporation on ATS-4 and ATS-5 as the sole propulsion system.

== Operational details ==
The satellite is in geo-synchronous orbit 34,047 kilometers (21,156 mi) above the Earth's surface. The satellite has served as a communications link for rescue operations, including the 1985 Mexico City earthquake and the 1980 eruption of Mount St. Helens.

Circa 1970, ATS-3 was used to collect images of weather patterns, especially developing hurricanes in the Western Hemisphere. 1,200 line photos were downlinked, approximately every 25 minutes, during daylight hours to NOAA's Command and Data Acquisition Station at Wallops Station, Virginia and transferred to various users. The satellite was known for its spinning beam antennas locking up and rotating with the satellite. When that happened, it took a powerful ground-based transmitter, like the one at Mojave, to blast through digital instructions to get the antenna aimed back at Earth again.

== Gallery ==
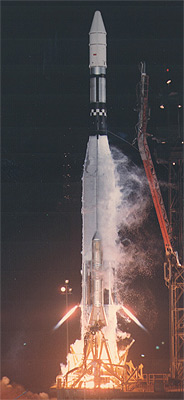
Launch of ATS-3

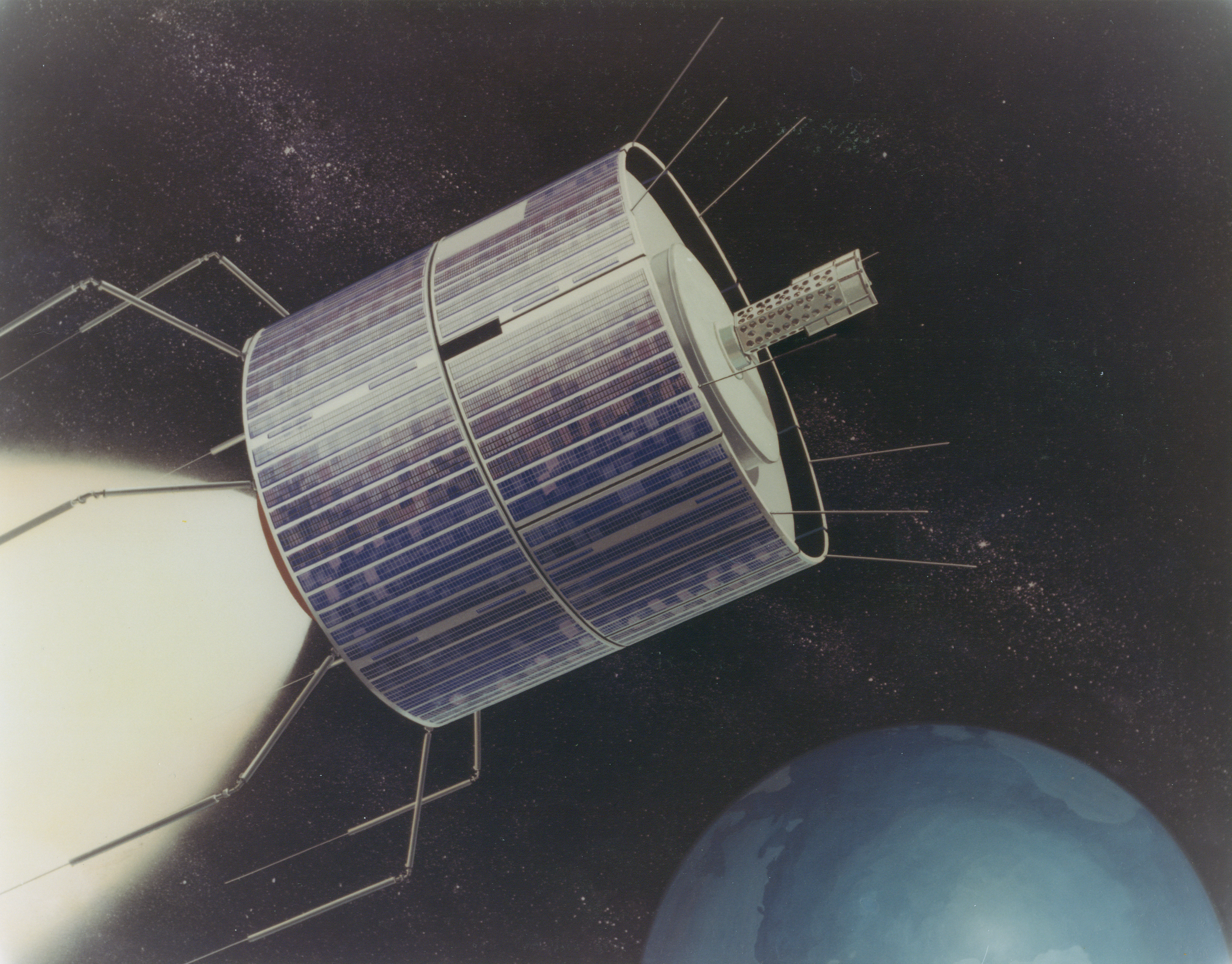
Concept artwork of the ATS-3 satellite.

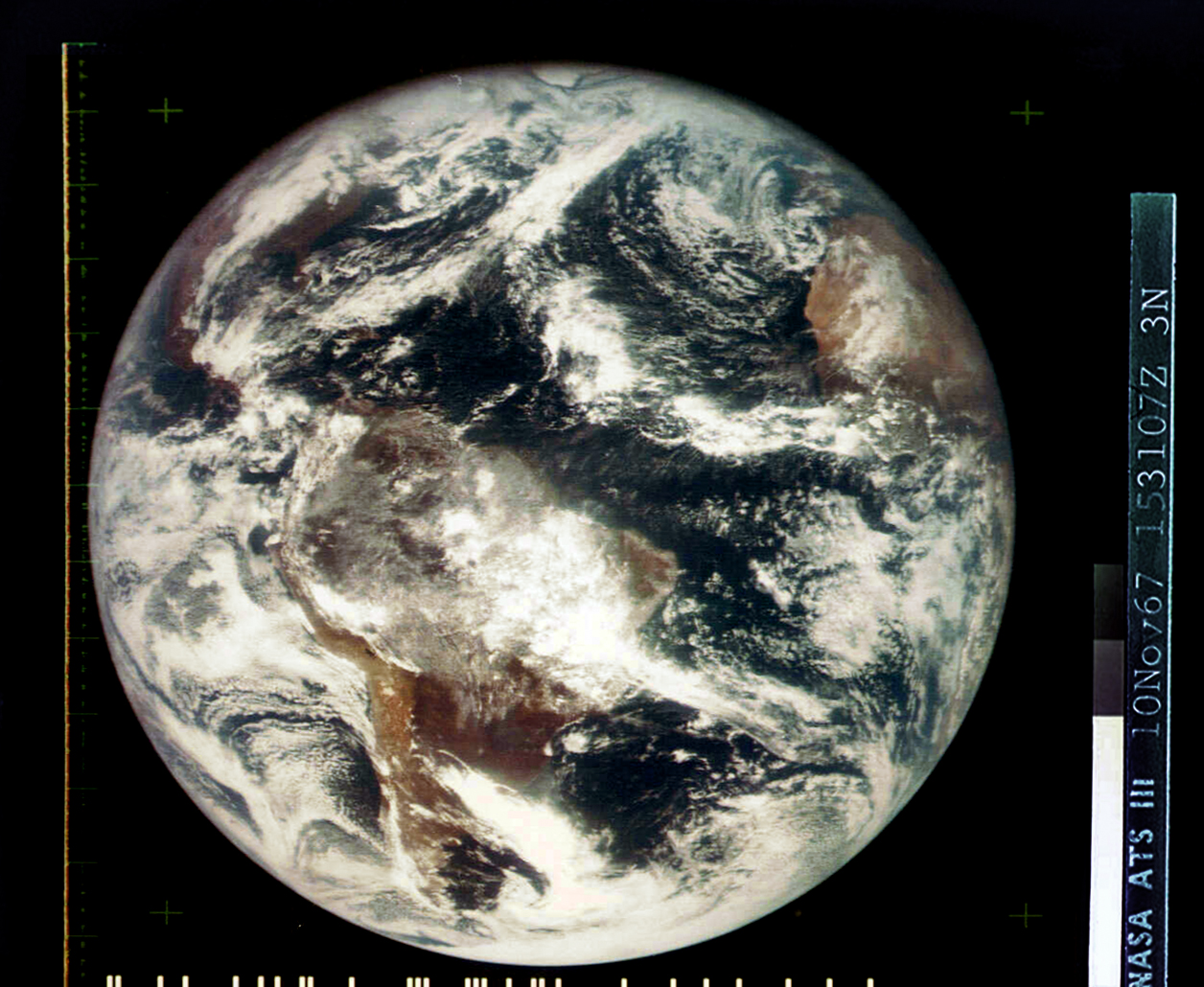
NASA's first color photo (digital image mosaic) of Earth, imaged in 1967 by ATS-3, was used as the cover of Whole Earth Catalog's first edition.

Time-lapse footage of the Earth captured by the NASA ATS III satellite in 1967.

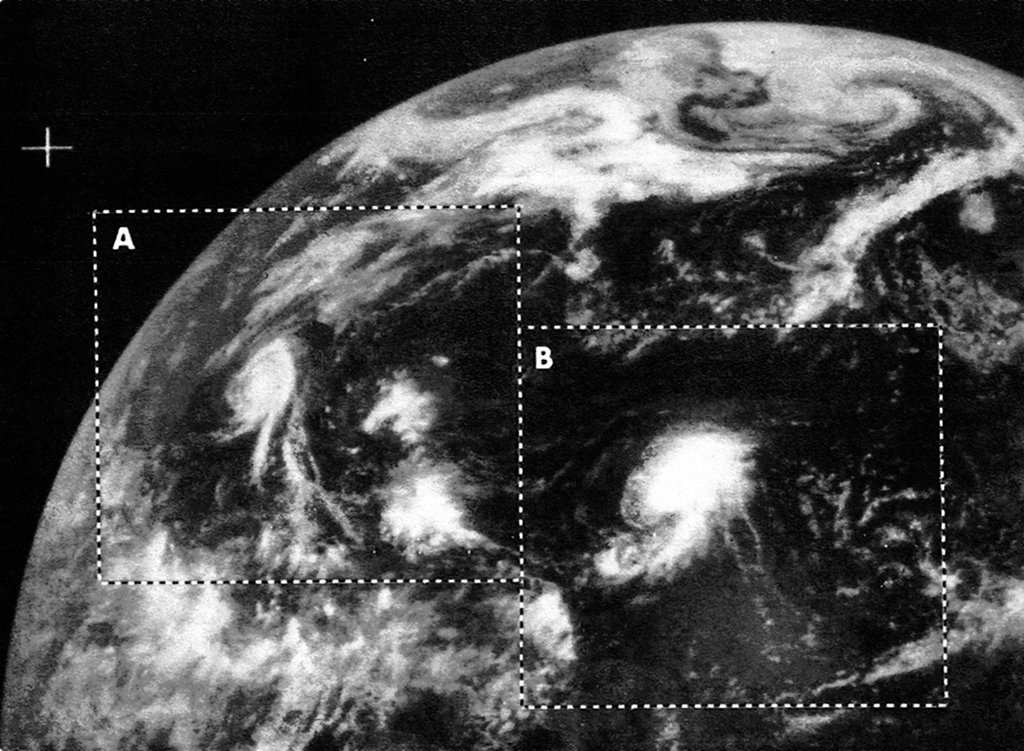
This ATS-3 Satellite shows Hurricane Camille (left) and Hurricane Debbie (right) on August 17, 1969

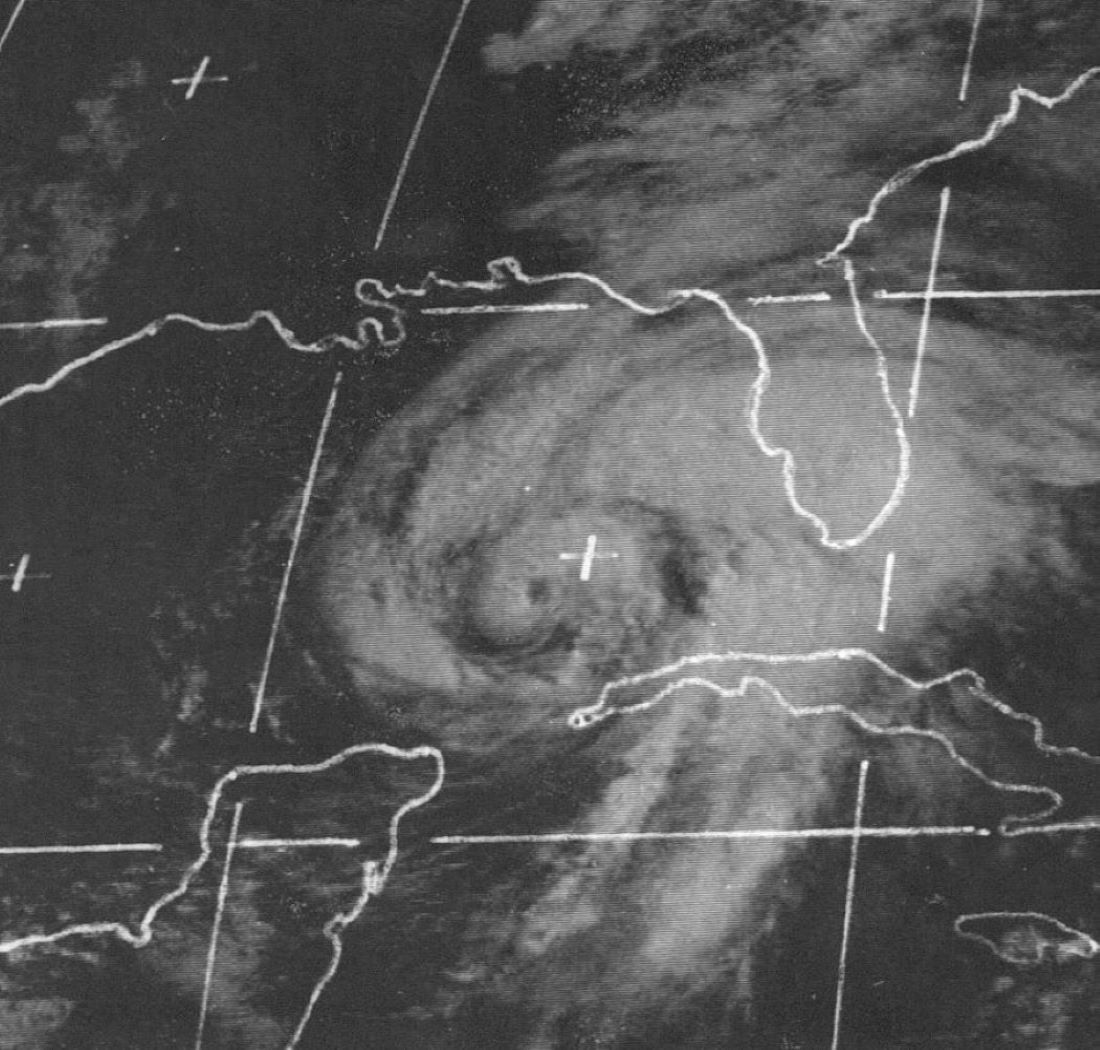
Hurricane Agnes made landfall in Florida on June 18, 1972, seen here from the ATS-3 satellite before moving ashore.

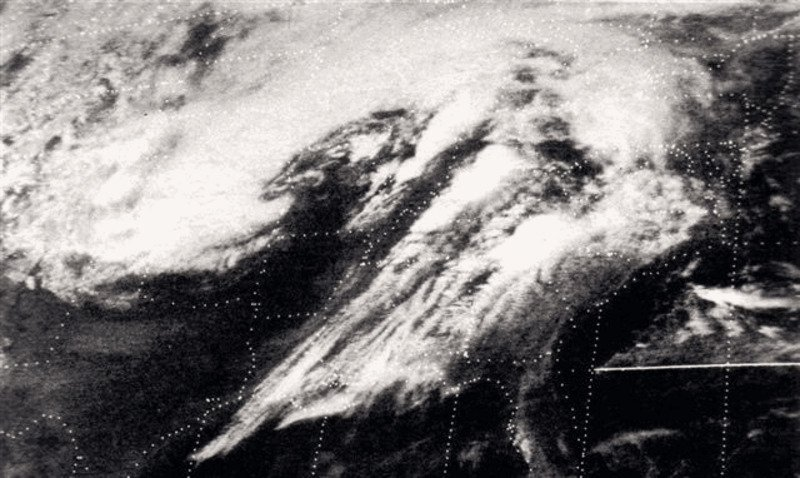
The April 3–4, 1974, "Super Outbreak" is the second-largest outbreak of tornadoes in the U.S. on record, and holds the record for the most F5 tornadoes on a single day. The image seen here is from the ATS-3 satellite on the afternoon of April 3, 1974, as the outbreak was beginning.

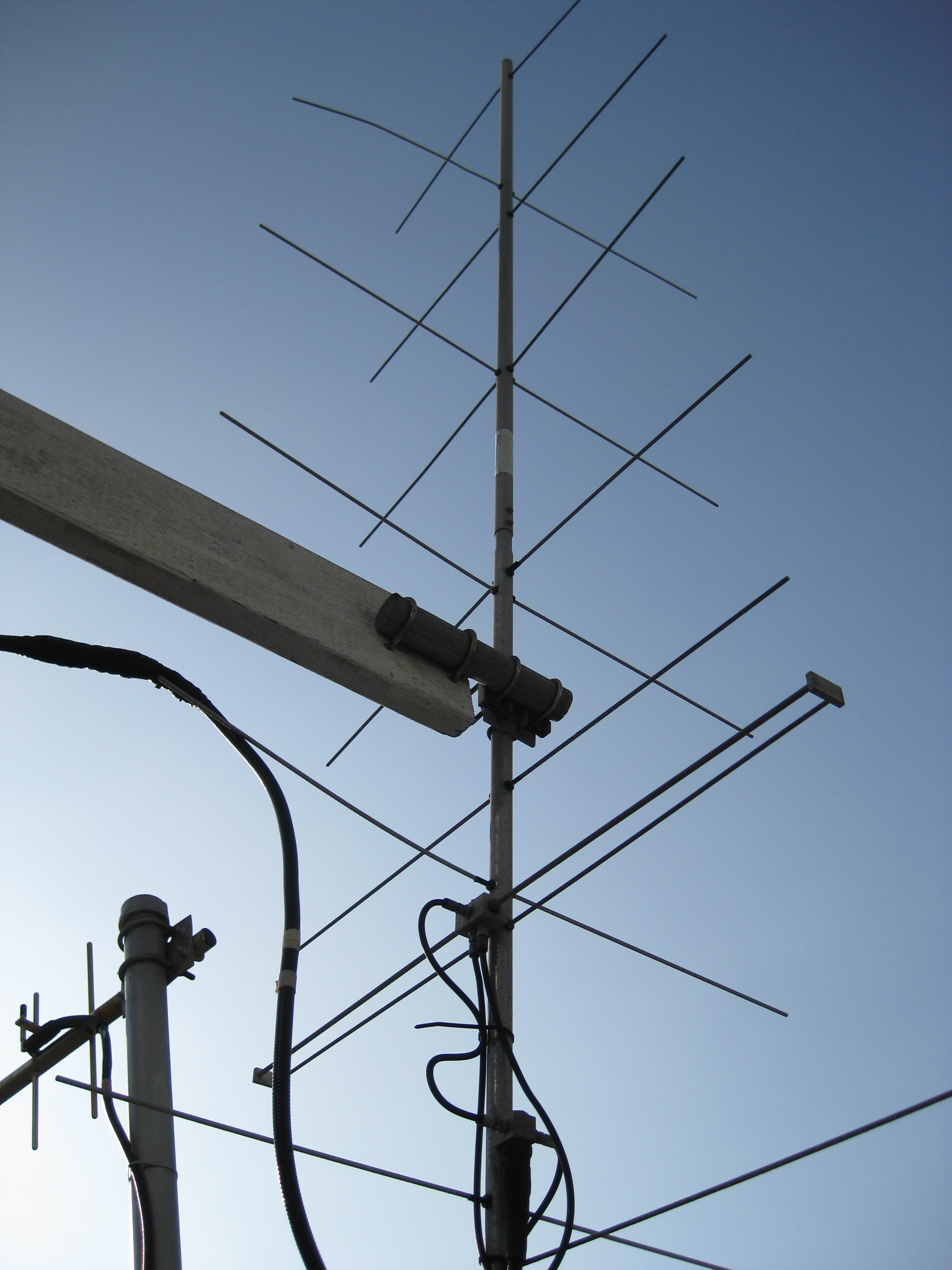
ATS-3 Ground Station Antenna

== See also ==
- 1967 in spaceflight
- First images of Earth from space
- Applications Technology Satellite
