= ATS-4 =

NASA communications satellite

ATS-4, Advanced Tech. Sat. 4, ATS-D, PL-683A, 03344
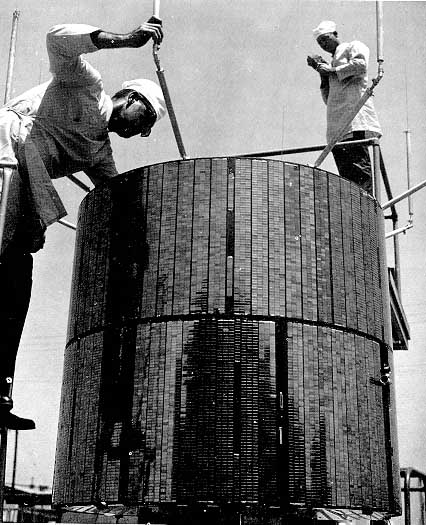
- ATS-4
- Mission type: Weather Satellite
- Operator: NASA
- COSPAR ID: 1968-068A
- SATCAT no.: 03344
- Mission duration: 38 days

Spacecraft properties
- Bus: HS-306
- Manufacturer: Hughes Aircraft
- Launch mass: 305 kilograms (672 lb)
- Power: 350 W (peak)

Start of mission
- Launch date: August 10, 1968, 22:33:00 UTC
- Rocket: Atlas SLV-3C Centaur-D (AC-17)
- Launch site: Cape Canaveral LC-36A

End of mission
- Disposal: August 10, 1968
- Decay date: October 17, 1968

Orbital parameters
- Reference system: Geocentric
- Regime: LEO
- Eccentricity: 0.042372
- Perigee altitude: 185.99 kilometres (115.57 mi)
- Apogee altitude: 766.89 kilometres (476.52 mi)
- Inclination: 29.141º
- Period: 94.131 minutes

ATS-4 (Applications Technology Satellite) also known as ATS-D was a communications satellite launched by NASA on August 10, 1968 from Cape Canaveral through an Atlas-Centaur (AC-17) rocket.

== Objectives ==
The objective of ATS-4 was to investigate the possibilities of a gravity gradient stabilization system (the method of stabilizing artificial satellites).

== Features ==
The satellite has a cylindrical shape with a 142-centimetre (56 in) diameter and 183-centimetre (72 in) height (about 360 centimetres (140 in) considering the motor cover) with the surface covered by solar panels that generated a maximum of 350 W of power, and stabilized by gravity gradient. It was based on the Hughes Aircraft HS-306 bus.

== Instruments ==
A total of four experiments were conducted during the mission:

- Microwave Transponder
- Gravity Gradient Stabilization
- Image Orthicon (Day/Night) Camera
- Ion Thruster

== Mission ==
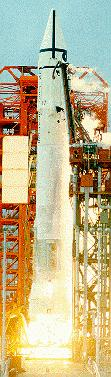
Atlas SLV-3C Centaur-D (AC-17) with ATS-4

The Atlas and Centaur stages performed satisfactorily and placed the Centaur/ATS-4 in an elliptical parking orbit. However the Centaur stage failed to re-ignite after a 61-minute coast. The failure was determined to be freezing of the hydrogen peroxide supply lines to the Centaur engines.

High atmospheric drag due to the low altitude of the achieved orbit (186 km perigee) precipitated the orbital decay of the spacecraft. ATS-4 still achieved good results in some of the experiments, but the primary objective of achieving gravity gradient stabilization of a satellite was not reached.

ATS-4 reentered the atmosphere on 17 October 1968.
