= VisAD =

VisAD is a Java component library for interactive and collaborative visualization and analysis of numerical data. It combines a flexible data model and distributed objects (via Java RMI) to support sharing of data, visualizations and user interfaces between different data sources, different computers and different scientific disciplines. It is licensed under the GNU LGPL.

VisAD is the basis of the Integrated Data Viewer, McIDAS V and other systems.

== Bibliography ==
- W. Hibbard, C. Dyer and B. Paul, Display of Scientific Data Structures for Algorithm Visualization, Proc. IEEE Visualization 1992, pp. 139–146.
- W. Hibbard, Visualizing Scientific Computations: A System based on Lattice-Structured Data and Display Models, PhD Thesis, Univ. of Wisc. Comp. Sci. Dept. Tech. Report, #1226, 1995.
- W. Hibbard, VisAD: Connecting people to computations and people to people, Computer Graphics 32, No. 3, 1998, pp. 10–12.
- W. Hibbard, Building 3-D User Interface Components Using a Visualization Library, Computer Graphics 36, No. 1, 2002, pp. 4–7.
- W. Hibbard, et al., Java distributed components for numerical visualization in VisAD, Communications of the ACM 48, No. 3, 2005, pp. 98–104.
