= Cave5D =

Immersive virtual reality software

Cave5D is an adaptation of Vis5D to the CAVE for immersive virtual reality. It is released under the GNU GPL.

== Bibliography ==
- W. Hibbard, J. Anderson, I. Foster, B. Paul, R. Jacob, C. Schafer, and M. Tyree, Exploring Coupled Atmosphere-Ocean Models Using Vis5D, International Journal of Supercomputer Applications 10, no. 2, 1996, pp. 211–222.
- B. Hibbard, Vis5D, Cave5D, and VisAD, in The Visualization Handbook ed. C. D. Hansen, C. R. Johnson. Elsevier, New York. 2005, pp. 673–688.
