= ATS-1 =

Early geostationary communications and weather satellite, launched in 1966

ATS-1, Advanced Tech. Sat. 1, ATS-B, 02608
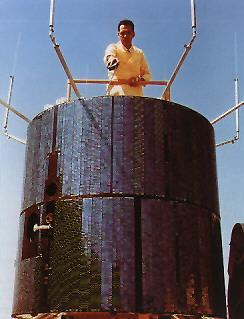
- Applications Technology Satellite 1 (ATS 1)
- Mission type: Weather Satellite
- Operator: NASA
- COSPAR ID: 1966-110A
- SATCAT no.: 02608
- Mission duration: 18 years

Spacecraft properties
- Bus: HS-306
- Manufacturer: Hughes Aircraft
- Launch mass: 352 kilograms (776 lb)

Start of mission
- Launch date: December 7, 1966, 02:12:01 UTC
- Rocket: Atlas SLV-3 Agena-D
- Launch site: Cape Canaveral LC-12

End of mission
- Last contact: April 1985

Orbital parameters
- Reference system: Geocentric
- Regime: GEO
- Semi-major axis: 42,152.0 kilometres (26,192.0 mi)
- Eccentricity: 0.00013
- Perigee altitude: 35,782.0 kilometres (22,233.9 mi)
- Apogee altitude: 35,793.0 kilometres (22,240.7 mi)
- Inclination: 3.6º
- Period: 1,435.5 minutes

ATS-1 (Applications Technology Satellite 1), also designated ATS-B or Advanced Tech. Sat. 1, was an experimental geostationary satellite, launched in 1966, and part of the Applications Technology Satellites Program. Though intended as a communications satellite rather than as a weather satellite, it carried the Spin Scan Cloud Camera developed by Verner E. Suomi and Robert Parent at the University of Wisconsin.

After entering an orbit at 23,000 mi (37,000 km) above Earth, initially in orbit over Ecuador, it transmitted weather images from the Western Hemisphere, as well as other data, to ground stations, including well as video feeds for television broadcasting.

It took one of the first pictures of the Earth's full-disk (the first from a geostationary orbit), on December 11, 1966.

"For the first time," historians would note later, "rapid-imaging of nearly an entire hemisphere was possible. We could watch, fascinated, as storm systems developed and moved and were captured in a time series of images. Today such images are an indispensable part of weather analysis and forecasting."

It was the first satellite to use frequency-division multiple access which accepted multiple independent signals and downlinked them in a single carrier.

The ATS-1 satellite was used during the 1967 international television broadcast Our World, providing a link between the United States and Australia during the program.

The ATS-1 would remain operational for more than 18 years, until April 1985.

== Features ==
This satellite was cylindrical, with a diameter of 142 cm (56 in) and a height of 135 cm (53 in); an additional 270 cm (110 in) in height was the engine cover. The surface was covered with solar panels, and the whole satellite was stabilized by rotation. It measured 56 inches (1,400 mm) in diameter, 57 inches (1,400 mm) high and weighed 750 lb (340 kg).

== Instruments ==
A total of fifteen experiments were conducted during the mission:

- Suprathermal Ion Detector
- Biaxial Fluxgate Magnetometer
- Omnidirectional Spectrometer
- Electron Spectrometer
- Particle Telescope
- Solar Cell Radiation Damage
- Thermal Coating Degradation
- Rate Range Beacon
- Spin Scan Cloud Camera
- Microwave communication transponder
- Communication VHF transponder
- Nutation sensor
- Resist-Jet Thruster
- Faraday Rotation
- Meteorological Data Relay System

== Gallery ==
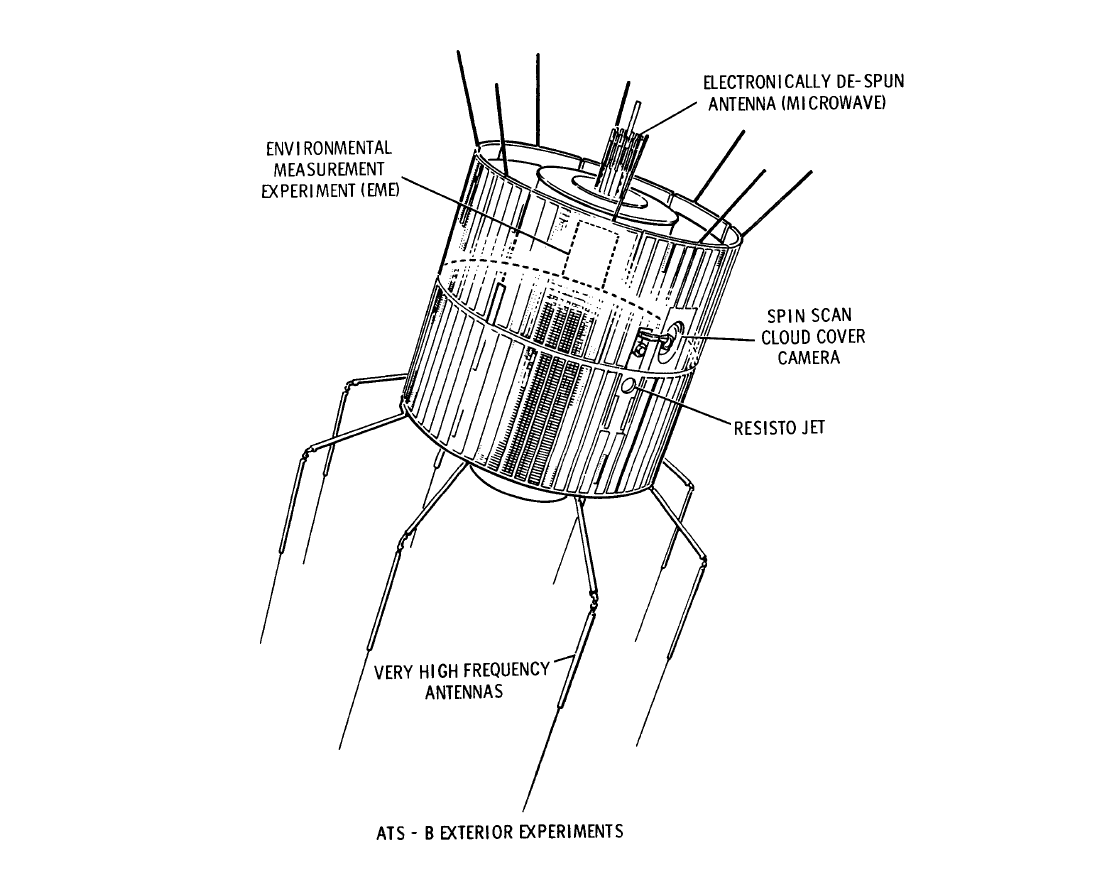
ATS-1 exterior scheme

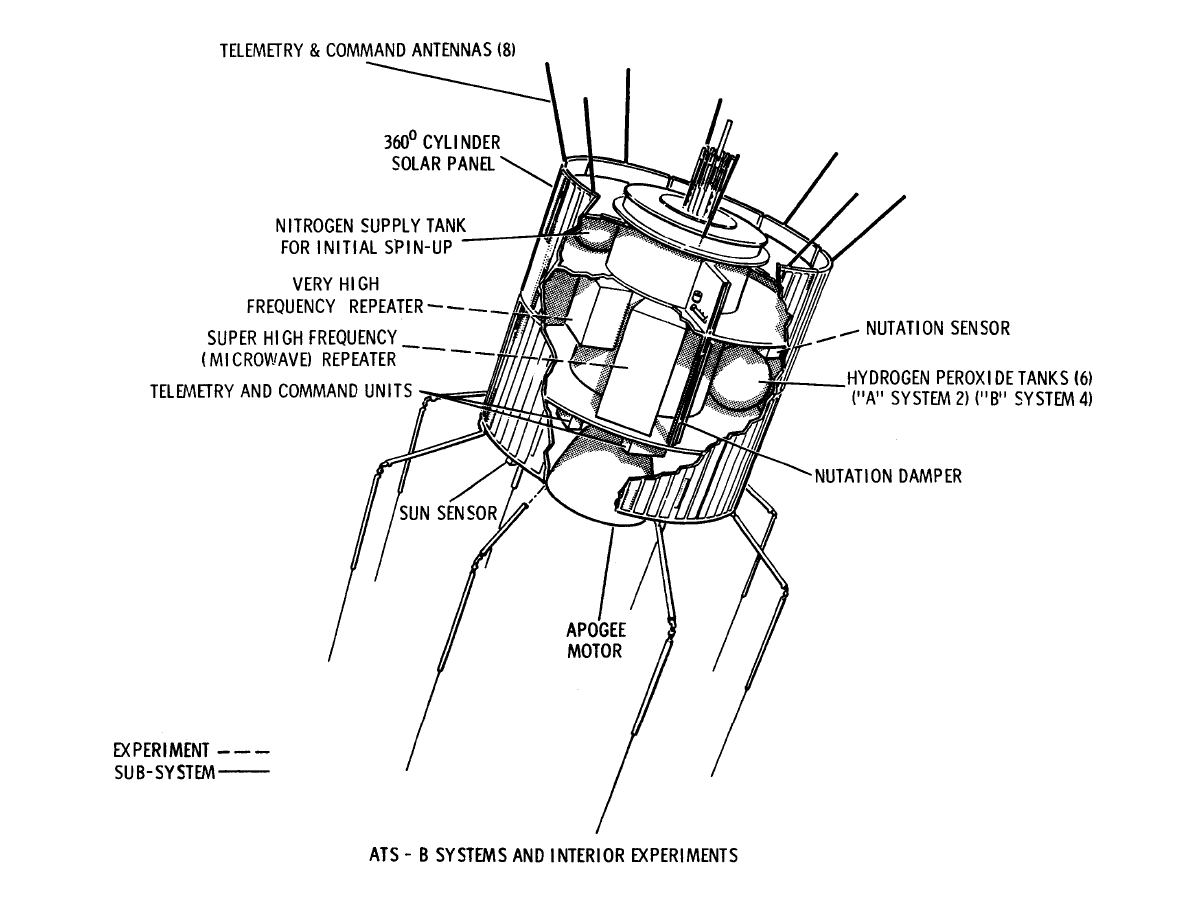
ATS-1 interior scheme

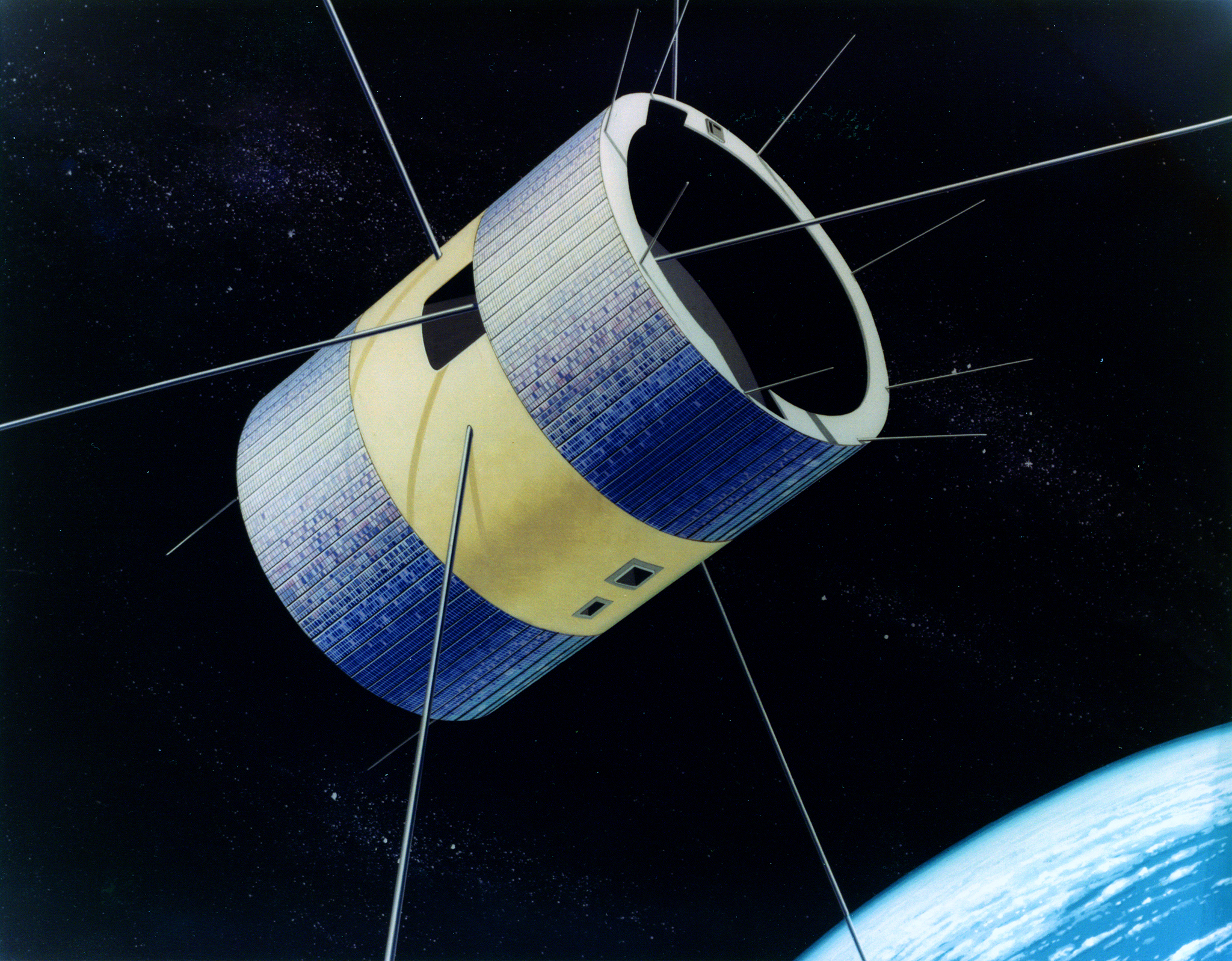
Concept artwork of the ATS-1 satellite

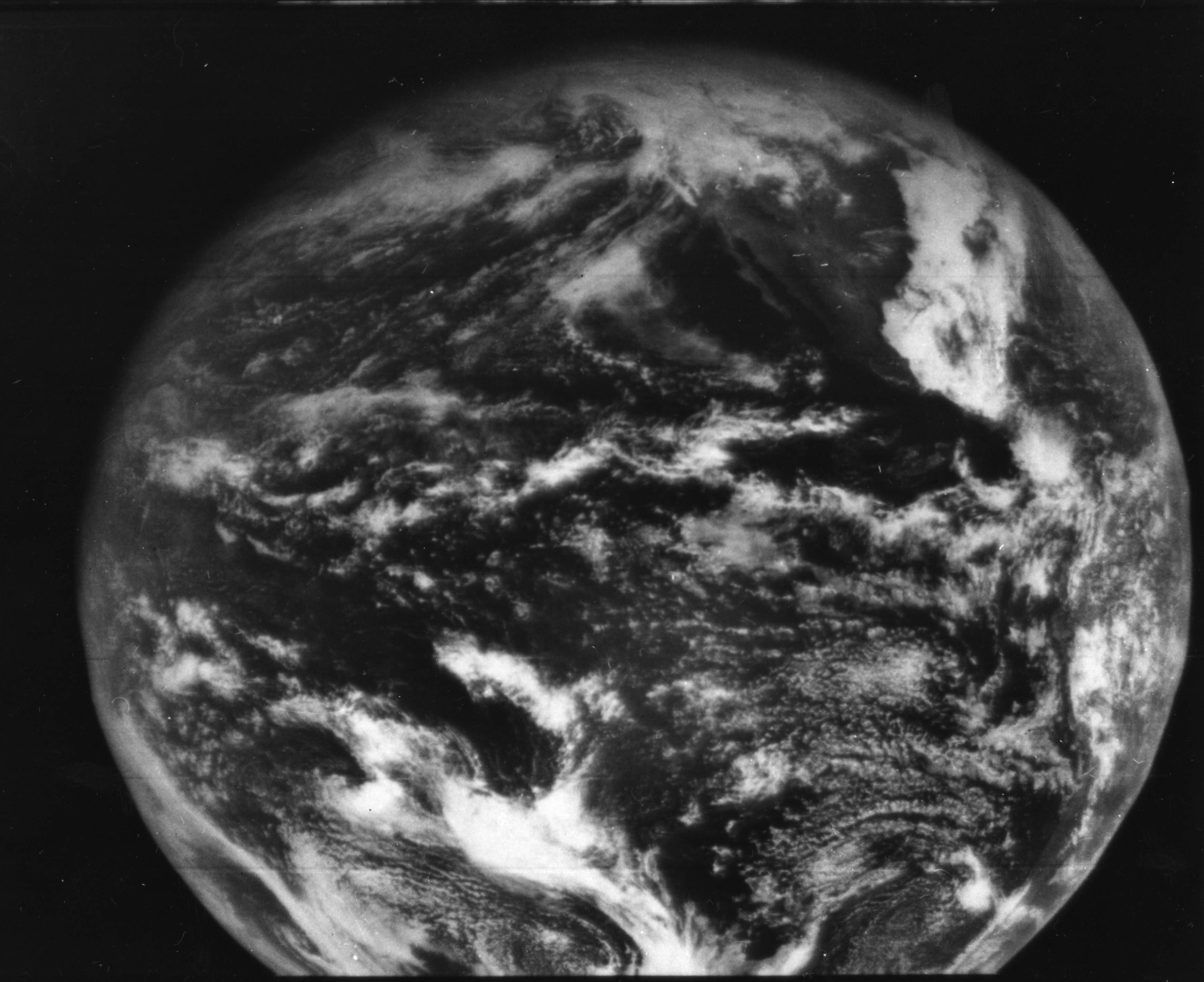
First full disk image of Earth from geostationary orbit (December 11, 1966)

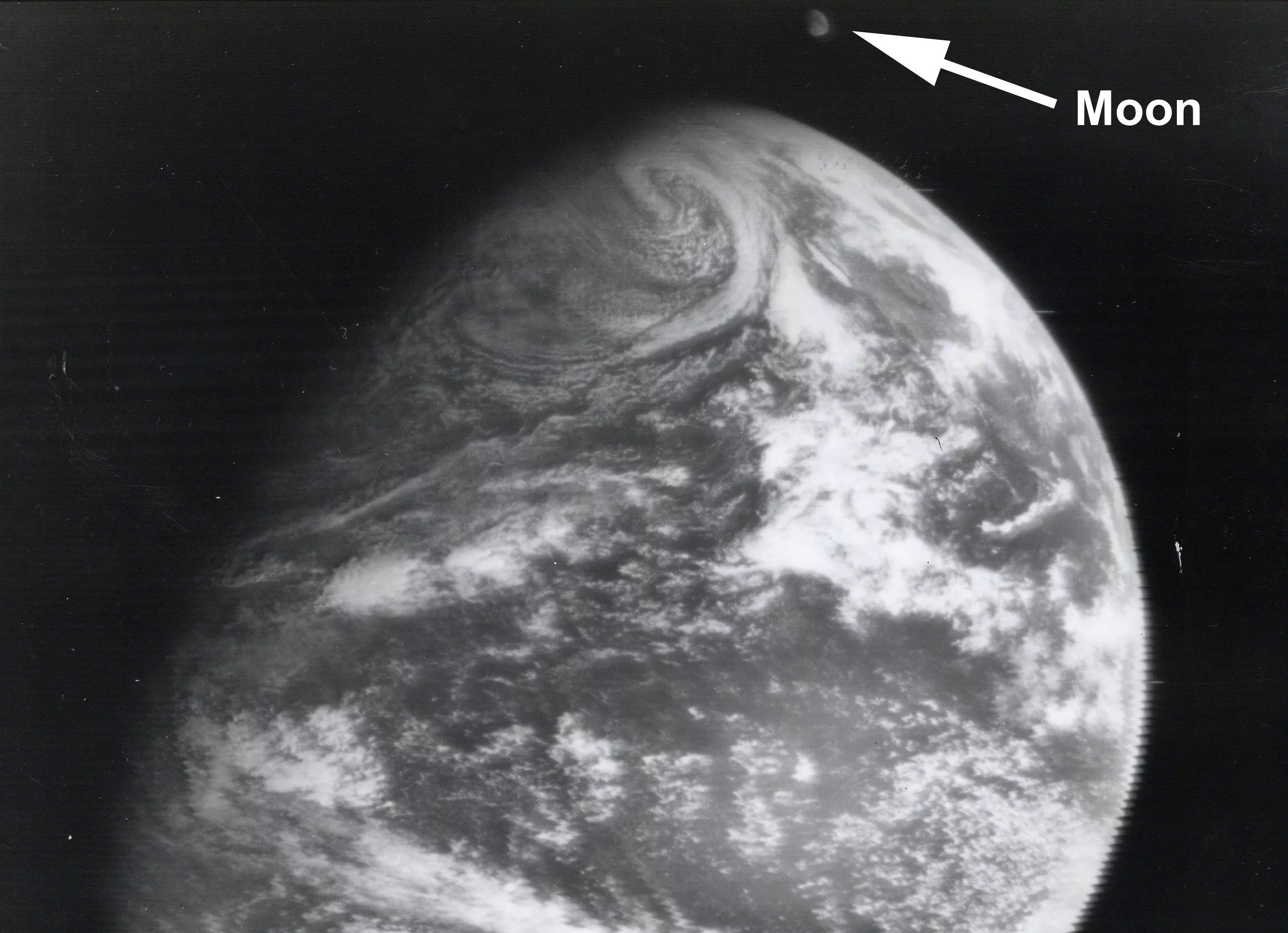
ATS-1 captured the first image of Earth and the moon together (December 11, 1966)

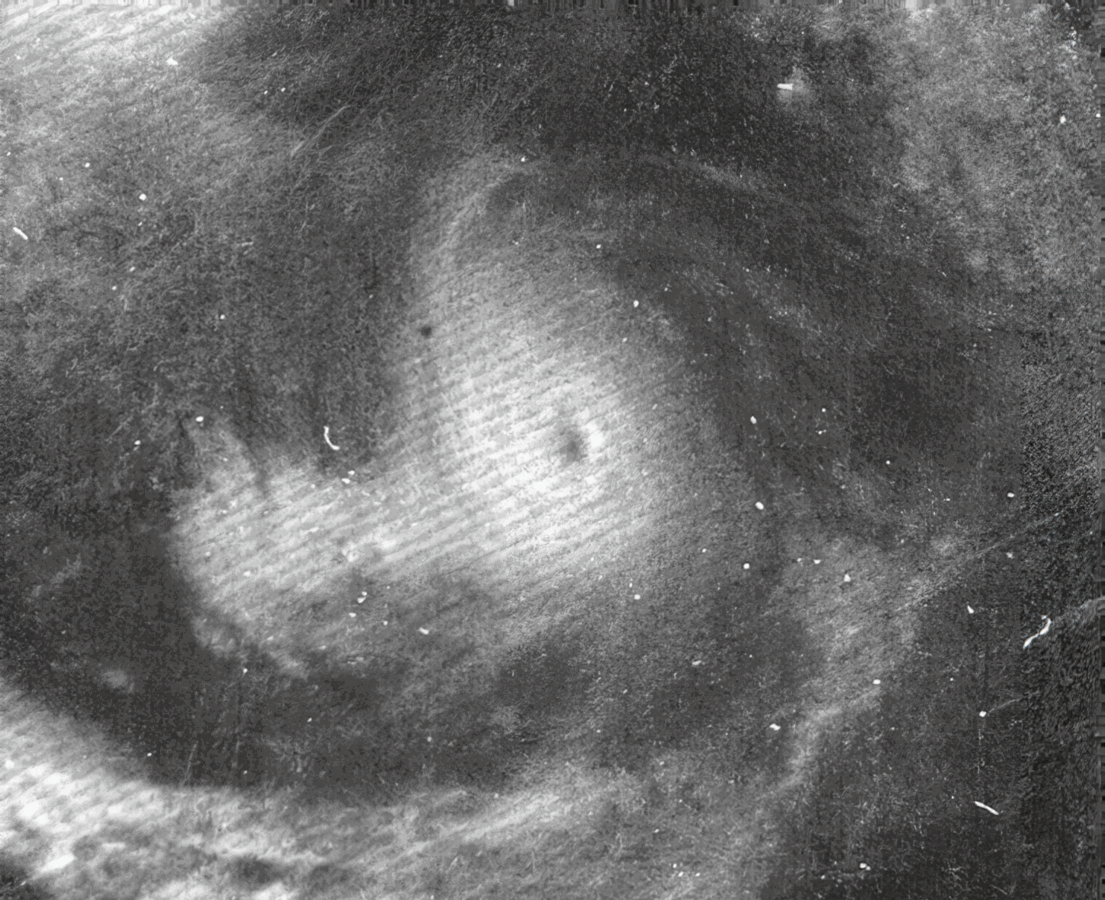
Section of an ATS-1 satellite image showing Hurricane Monica,(September 2, 1971)
