= Vis5D =

Scientific visualization tool

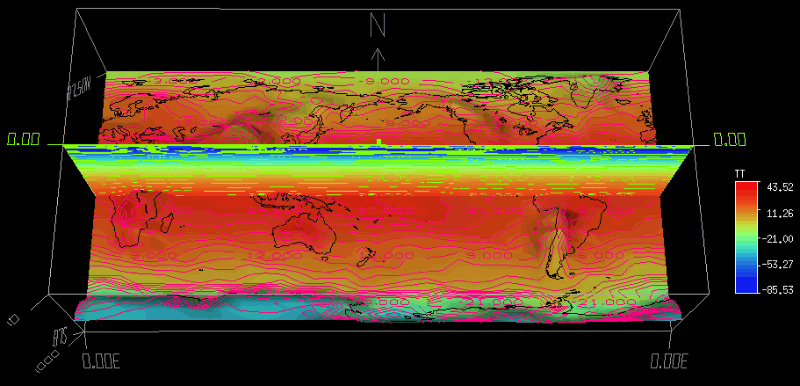
- Vis5D screen
- Operating system: Unix/Linux, Mac OS X, Microsoft Windows
- Type: Scientific visualization, Interactive visualization
- License: GPL
- Website: www.ssec.wisc.edu/~billh/vis5d.html

Vis5D is a 3D visualization system used primarily for animated 3D visualization of weather simulations. It was the first system to produce fully interactive animated 3D displays of time-dynamic volumetric data sets and the first open source 3D visualization system. It is GNU GPL licensed.

== Design ==
Vis5D was created in response to two circumstances:

1. Output data from weather models and similar simulations are sampled on time sequences of regular 3D grids and are relatively straightforward to visualize.
2. The appearance in 1988 of commercial workstations such as the Stellar GS 1000 capable of rendering Gouraud-shaded 3D graphics fast enough for smooth animation.

Vis5D takes its name from its 5D array containing time sequences of 3D spatial grids for a set of physical parameters of the atmosphere or ocean. Its graphical user interface enables users to select from various ways of visualizing each parameter (e.g., iso-surfaces, plane slices, volume renderings), and to select a combination of parameters for view. A key innovation of Vis5D is that it computes and stores the geometries and colors for such graphics over the simulated time sequence, allowing them to be animated quickly so users can watch movies of their simulations. Furthermore, users can interactively rotate the animations in 3D.

Vis5D provides other visualization techniques. Users can drag a 3D cursor to a selected time and location, then trigger the calculation of a forward and backward wind trajectory from that point. Users can drag a vertical bar cursor and see, in another window, a thermodynamic diagram for the selected vertical column of atmosphere. And users can drag a 3D cursor to a selected time and location and read out individual values for parameters at that point. These examples all involve direct manipulation interfaces, as does the placement of plane slices through 3D grids.

Vis5D provides options for memory management, so that very large data sets can be visualized at individual time steps without the need to compute graphics over the simulation's entire time sequence, while smaller data sets can be visualized with full animation. Vis5D also provides an API enabling developers of other systems to incorporate Vis5D's functionality. This API is the basis of a TCL scripting capability so users can write automated scripts for producing animations.

== History ==
Vis5D was first demonstrated, via videotape, at the December 1988 Workshop on Graphics in Meteorology at the ECMWF. The first live demos were at the January 1989 annual meeting of the American Meteorological Society.

Vis5D running on the GS 1000 was the first visualization system to provide smooth animation of 3D gridded time-sequence data sets with interactive rotation.

Vis5D was the first open-source 3D visualization system.

Vis5D is a natural for immersive virtual reality and was adapted to the CAVE for the VROOM at the 1994 SIGGRAPH conference. This became Cave5D.
