= Space Technology 6 =

Space Technology 6 (ST-6) is part of the NASA New Millennium Program. ST-6 is a subsystem technology demonstration that consisted of 2 separate projects, the Autonomous Sciencecraft Experiment on board the Earth Observing 1 satellite and the Inertial Stellar Compass (ISC) experiment aboard TacSat-2.

== Overview ==
The Autonomous Sciencecraft Experiment (ASE) is a software experiment that has been operating on board the Earth Observing-1 mission since 2003. The ASE software uses onboard continuous planning, robust task and goal-based execution, and onboard machine learning and pattern recognition to radically increase science return by enabling intelligent downlink selection and autonomous retargeting. This software demonstrates the potential for space missions to use onboard decision-making to detect, analyze, and respond to science events, and to downlink only the highest value science data.

The Inertial Stellar Compass (ISC) enables a spacecraft to continuously determine its attitude or the direction in which it is pointing. It also enables a spacecraft to recover its orientation (direction and pointing) after a temporary malfunction or power loss. This is done by combining a miniaturized star camera and a gyro system. Although this is not a new concept, the small size and low power consumption are revolutionary and an important feature for the new, smaller spacecraft and satellites of the future. It was flown aboard the TacSat-2 spacecraft in 2006.
