= Adam Steltzner =

American aerospace engineer

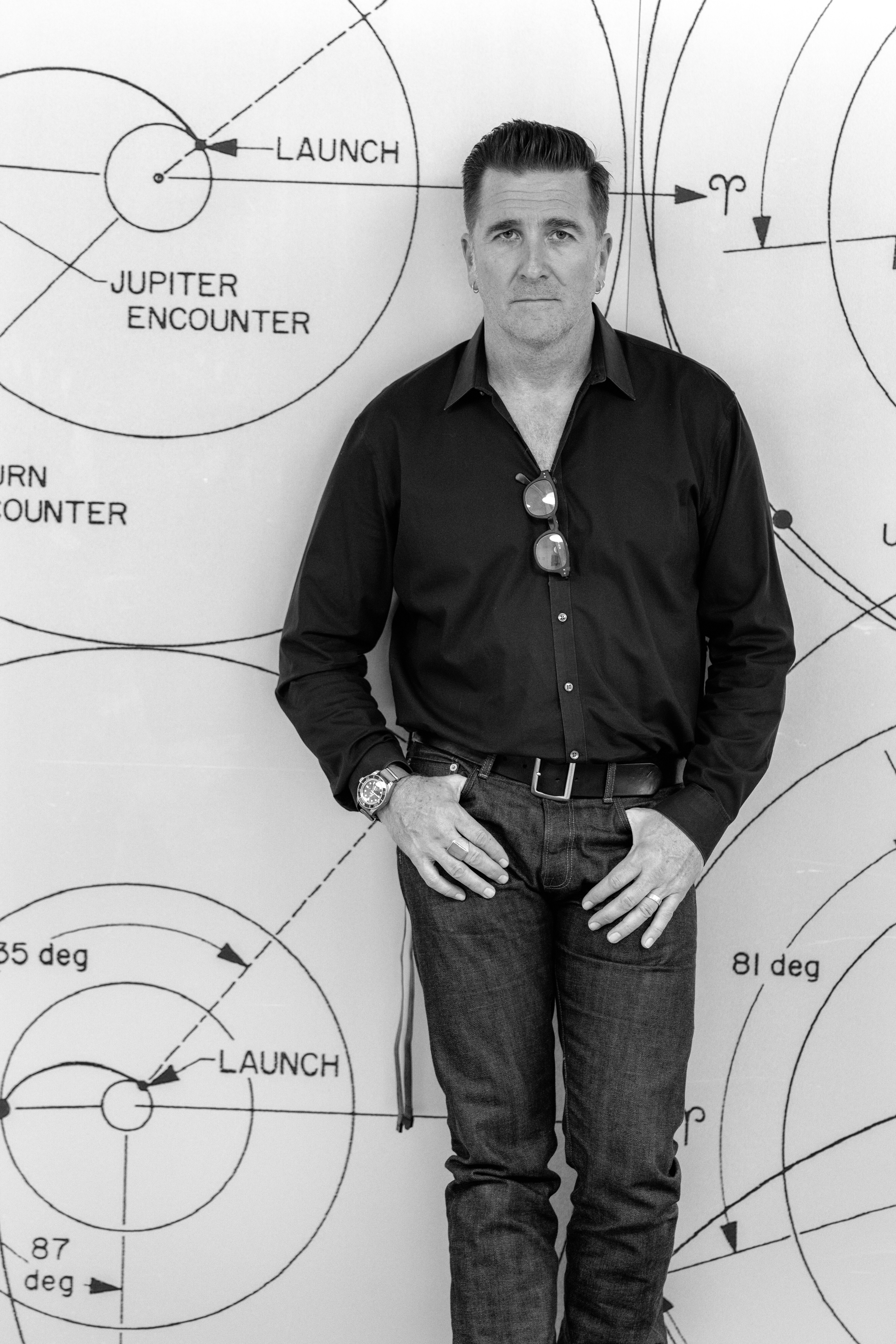
- Adam Steltzner at JPL in 2021
- Born: Adam Diedrich Steltzner; 1963 (age 62–63); Alameda County, California
- Education: College of Marin; University of California, Davis (BSc); California Institute of Technology (MSc); University of Wisconsin–Madison (PhD)
- Known for: Mars Pathfinder; Mars Exploration Rovers; Mars Science Laboratory; Mars 2020; Mars sample-return mission
- Scientific career
- Workplaces: NASA Jet Propulsion Laboratory; University of Wisconsin–Madison; University of California, Davis; California Institute of Technology
- Thesis: Input force estimation, inverse structural systems and the inverse structural filter (1999)
- Doctoral advisor: Daniel C. Kammer
- Website: www.adamsteltzner.com

Adam Diedrich Steltzner (born 1963) is an American NASA engineer who works for the Jet Propulsion Laboratory (JPL). He worked on several flight projects including Galileo, Cassini, Mars Pathfinder, Mars Exploration Rovers (MER). He was the lead engineer of the Mars Science Laboratory's EDL phase (Entry, Descent and Landing), and helped design, build and test the sky crane landing system.

The media has portrayed Steltzner as a "rock and roll" engineer. NPR's Morning Edition said "he has pierced ears, wears snakeskin boots and sports an Elvis haircut," while the EE Times called him "a bit of a hipster" and a "new breed of engineer" who is media savvy.

== Personal life ==
Steltzner, born 1963, is a native of the San Francisco Bay Area and came from a family that was financially well off, his father being an heir to the Schilling spice fortune. He struggled in classes in high school, earned a failing grade in geometry, and was told by his father he would never amount to anything but a ditch digger. "I was sort of studying sex, drugs and rock and roll in high school," says Steltzner. After high school he played bass and drums in new wave bands. He studied jazz at Berklee College of Music in Boston, for less than a year. As The New Yorker put it, "He was a college dropout and small-town playboy (he briefly dated the model Carré Otis), an assistant manager at an organic market and an occasional grower of weed. He had few skills and fewer prospects." Around 1984, while driving home from music gigs at night, he noticed how the position of the constellation Orion was in a different place than before which led him to enroll in an astronomy class at College of Marin and quit music. His education included Tamalpais High School (1981) and College of Marin; a Bachelor of Science degree in mechanical engineering at University of California, Davis (1990); a Master of Science degree in applied mechanics at California Institute of Technology (1991); and a PhD in engineering mechanics at University of Wisconsin–Madison (1999).

Steltzner is married with three children; his wife once worked at JPL as well. His second daughter was born three weeks after the Mars landing in 2012.

Steltzner published an autobiographical book in 2016 titled The Right Kind of Crazy: A True Story of Teamwork, Leadership, and High-Stakes Innovation, a memoir of his time at the Jet Propulsion Laboratory and the building of the Mars Science Laboratory. In October 2016, he was elected as a member into the National Academy of Engineering. Steltzner speaks publicly on the topics of leadership, innovation, team building, and the power of curiosity and exploration.

== Career ==
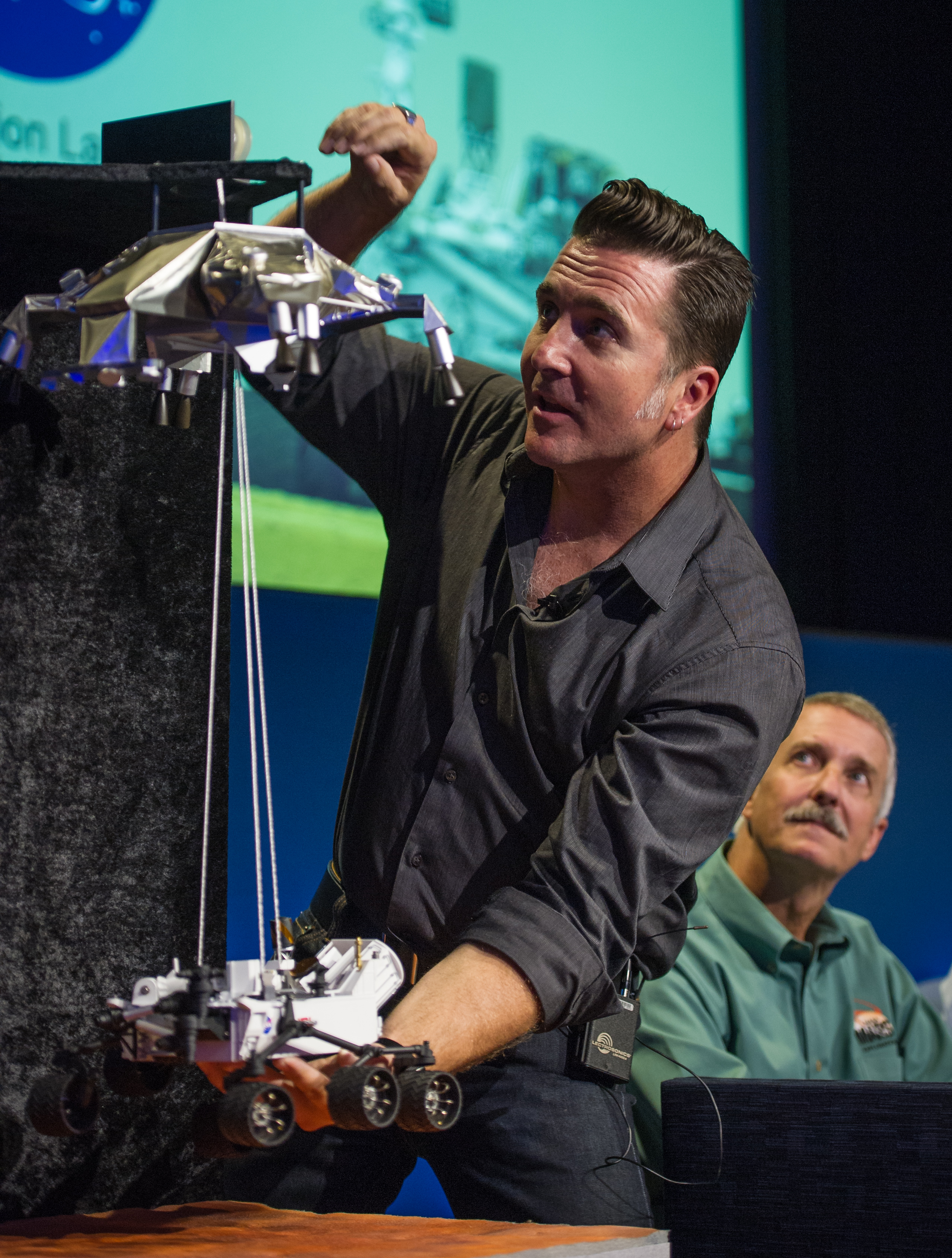
Steltzner demonstrates the Curiosity sky crane landing system

Steltzner is employed at NASA's Jet Propulsion Laboratory where he designed, tested and built the sky crane landing system for the Curiosity rover. Steltzner was phase lead and development manager for EDL (Entry, Descent and Landing) of the lander, which successfully landed on Mars on August 5, 2012. The sky crane was an entirely new technology system, Steltzner said of it "When people look at it...it looks crazy. That's a very natural thing. Sometimes when we look at it, it looks crazy. It is the result of reasoned, engineering thought. But it still looks crazy." The sky crane allows for a precise landing ellipse opening up many areas of Mars for exploration that were previously inaccessible due to uneven terrain.

Steltzner joined JPL in 1991, in the Spacecraft Structures and Dynamics group. He worked on several flight projects including the Shuttle–Mir Program, Galileo, Cassini, Mars Pathfinder, Mars Exploration Rovers (MER) and Mars Science Laboratory as well as several mission proposals, pre-Phase A projects and technology development efforts. Initially employed as a structures and mechanics personnel, he gravitated towards landing events and Mars Entry, Descent and Landing (EDL) systems. He was the landing systems engineer on the cancelled comet mission Champollion and the mechanical systems lead for EDL on MER. When asked what he would like to do next, Steltzner says, "I'd like to see a Mars sample return. I'd like to land on the surface of Europa – the most likely place in the solar system for life. And third, I'd like to float a boat on the methane lakes of Titan."

Steltzner was the chief engineer of the Mars 2020 project, which launched the Perseverance rover to Mars in July 2020. The mission is taking Martian surface samples and rock cores for potential return to Earth by a later mission. In June of 2026, Steltzner was assigned to be the Chief Engineer for Special Projects at NASA. In this role he supports the technical success of the agency's highest priority missions, including Artemis, SR-1, Moon Base and emerging X-planes.

== Media appearances ==
Adam Steltzner speech given on the successful landing of Mars curiosity, August 6, 2012 (2m25s). Full video.

Steltzner is often profiled by the press in human interest stories with a focus on a "rock and roll" engineer image; for example he was called "the face of the 2012 Mars Science Laboratory mission" by the EE Times, who also called him "a bit of a hipster"; he was interviewed on National Public Radio which noted his "Elvis haircut", and profiled again on NPR in a piece called "Red Planet, Green Thumb: How A NASA Scientist Engineers His Garden". Steltzner also participated on the NPR radio quiz program Wait Wait... Don't Tell Me! in 2012. He has been profiled similarly in other sources. A chapter-length biography of Steltzner in the book Going to Mars (2004) is titled "Elvis Lives" after the rock and roll star who Steltzner supposedly resembles, which Esquire said "calls back to NASA's halcyon days in the late 1950s and early 1960s".

He was among the scientists and engineers featured on the NOVA episode "Mars Dead or Alive" (2004), which chronicled the process that ultimately delivered the rovers Spirit and Opportunity to Mars. The episode was nominated for an Emmy in 2004. He also appeared in the NOVA episodes "Welcome to Mars" (2005) and "The Great Math Mystery" (2015), Roadtrip Nation (2014), and other TV documentaries including Countdown to Mars (2003), Bouncing to Mars (2003), Spirit of Exploration (2005), What Went Right (2006), Mars Rising episodes "Journey to the Red Planet" and "Seven Minutes of Terror" (2007), and Horizon episodes "Mission to Mars: A Horizon Special" (2012) and "Man on Mars: Mission to the Red Planet" (2014). Steltzner appeared on the news program Studio B with Shepard Smith on August 6, 2012.

== Awards and honors ==
- 2005 ASME Leonardo Da Vinci Award by the American Society of Mechanical Engineers
- 2012 Nature named Steltzner one of 10 most important scientists of the year
- 2012 World Technology Award in Ethics given by the International Society for Ethics and Information Technology
- 2013 Smithsonian magazine's American Ingenuity Award in the Technology category
- 2013 Space Pioneer Award for Science and Engineering presented by the National Space Society to the Mars Science Laboratory Entry, Descent, and Landing (EDL) team
- 2014 Yvonne C. Brill Lectureship of the American Institute of Aeronautics and Astronautics (AIAA)
- 2014 Astronautics Engineer Award given by the National Space Club as part of the Goddard Memorial Dinner Awards
- 2016 Inducted into the National Academy of Engineering

== See also ==
- Miguel San Martín, Chief Engineer for the Guidance, Navigation, and Control system in the latest missions to Mars
- Bobak Ferdowsi, frequently discussed in conjunction with Steltzner
