= Sky crane (landing system) =

Soft landing system for Mars rovers

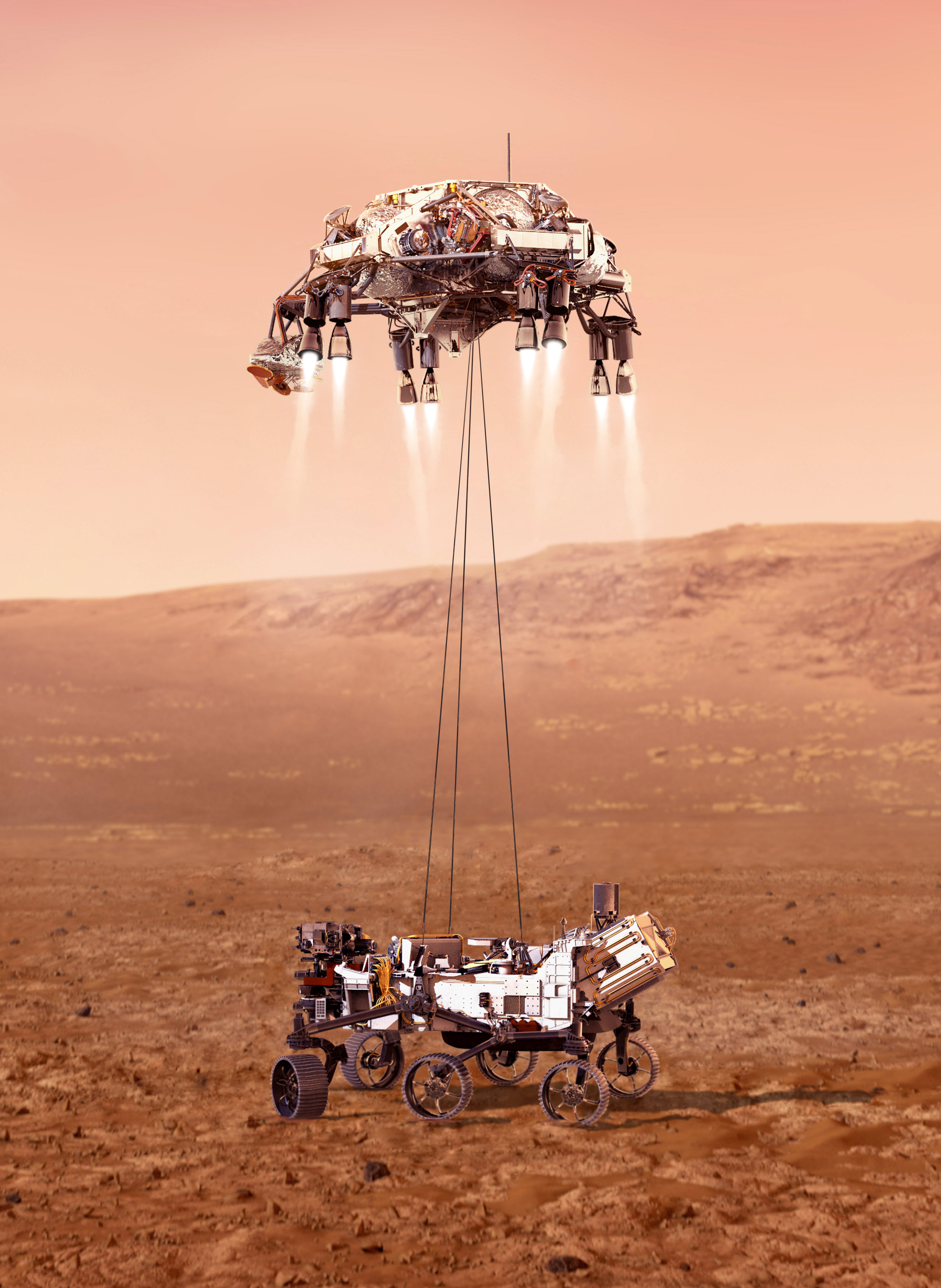
An Illustration of Perseverance tethered to the sky crane.

The sky crane is a soft landing system used in the last part of the entry, descent and landing (EDL) sequence developed by NASA Jet Propulsion Laboratory for its two largest Mars rovers, Curiosity and Perseverance. While previous rovers used airbags for landing, both Curiosity and Perseverance were too heavy to be landed this way; instead, a landing system that combined parachutes and retrorockets was developed. The sky crane is a platform with eight engines that lowers the rover on three nylon tethers until the soft landing.

EDL begins when the spacecraft reaches the top of the Martian atmosphere. Engineers have referred to the time it takes to land on Mars as the "seven minutes of terror."

== Background ==
The first NASA rover, Sojourner (on the Mars Pathfinder lander), and twin rovers Spirit and Opportunity, used a combination of parachutes, retrorockets, and airbags for landing. Curiosity, launched in 2011, weighs nearly 900 kg, and was too heavy to be landed this way, as the airbags needed for it would be too heavy to be launched on a rocket. Instead, a landing system that combined a protective aeroshell, supersonic parachutes, and sky crane was developed by the Jet Propulsion Laboratory (JPL) under Adam Steltzner. Sky crane is "an eight-rocket jetpack attached to the rover". This system is also much more precise: while the Mars Exploration Rovers could have landed anywhere within their respective 93-mile by 12-mile (150 by 20 kilometer) landing ellipses, Mars Science Laboratory landed within a 12-mile (20-kilometer) ellipse. Mars 2020 has an even more precise system, with a landing ellipse of 7.7 by 6.6 km.

The Curiosity team invented the sky crane system by studying old Viking landing system—its engines are "an upgraded 'reinvention' of Viking’s throttleable engines"—and landing experience from previous rovers. The sky crane works much like a helicopter, and the team even consulted with Sikorsky Skycrane helicopter engineers and pilots.

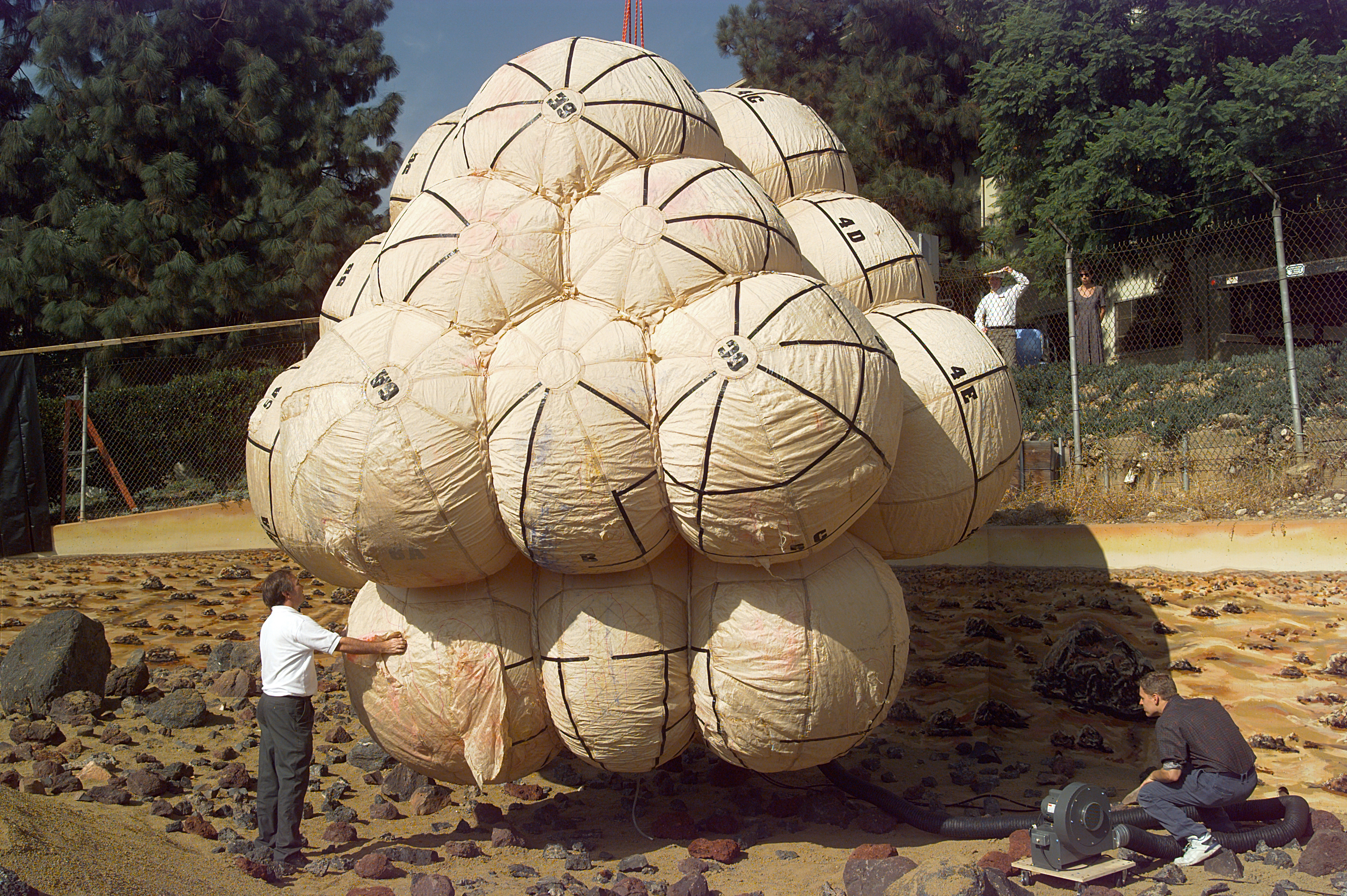
Airbags used for the Sojourner, Spirit and Opportunity rovers.

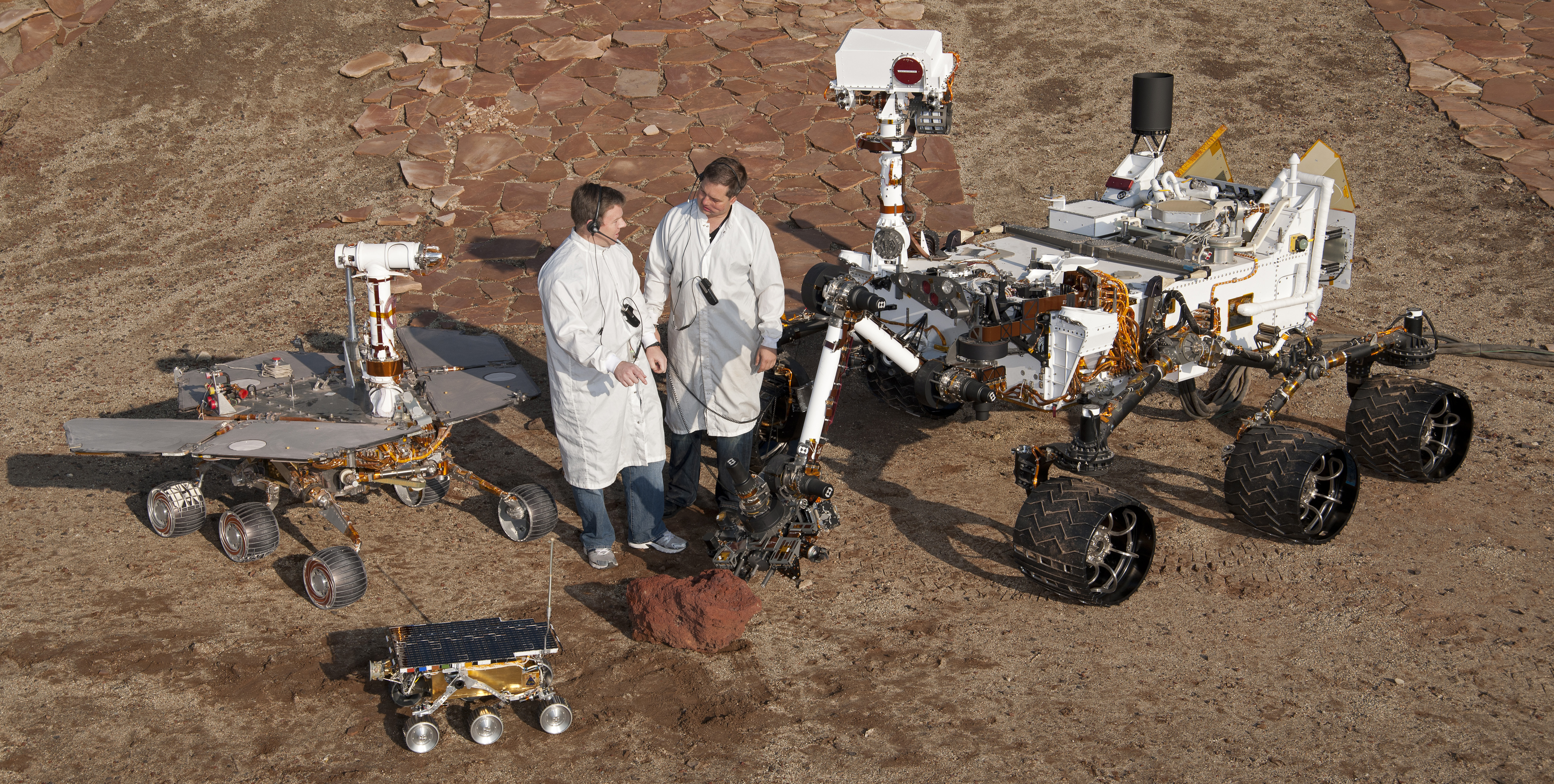
Comparison of the Sojourner, Mars Exploration Rovers, and the Curiosity

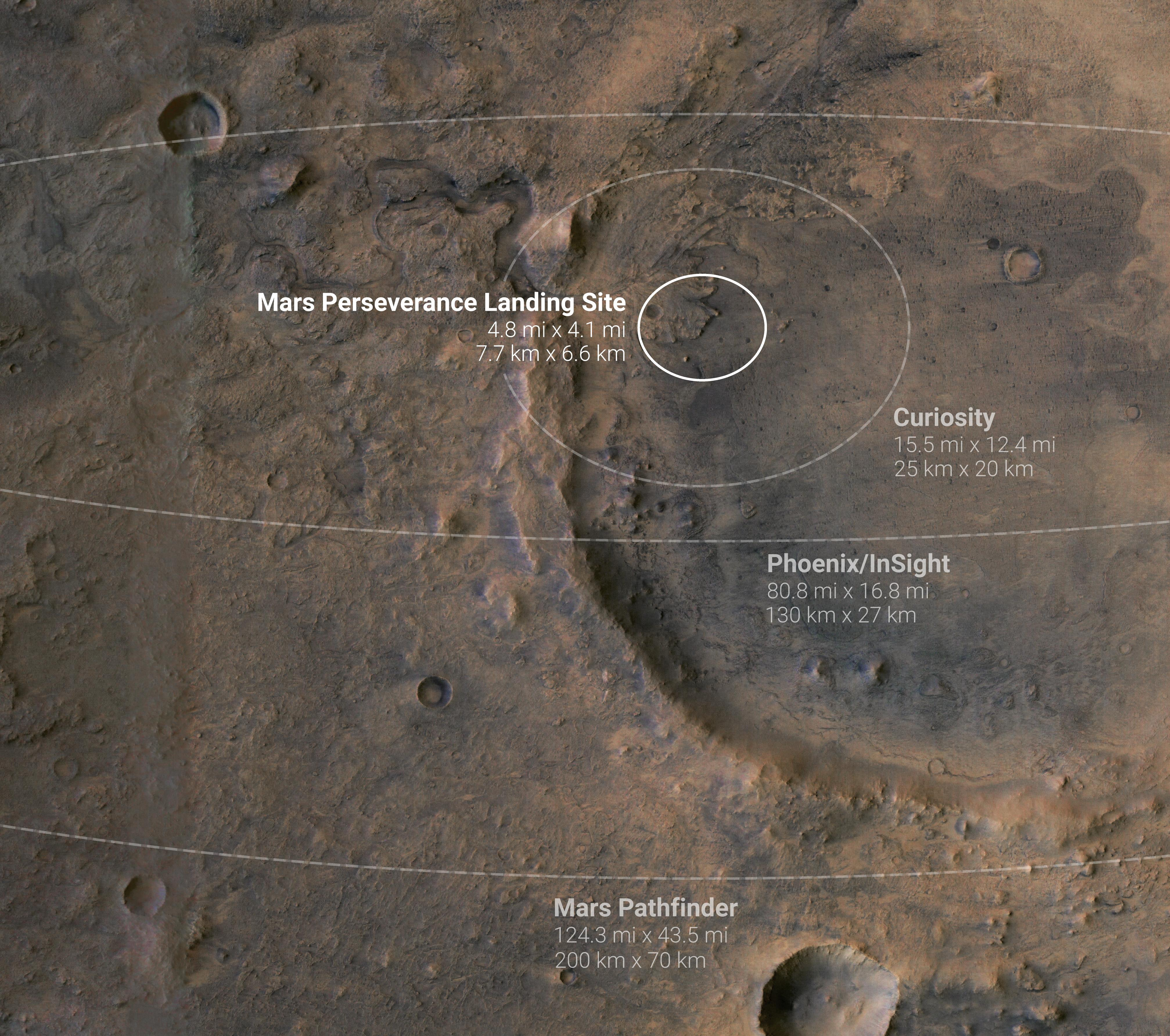
Comparison of landing ellipses for Perseverance, Curiosity, InSight lander, Phoenix lander, and Mars Pathfinder.

== Curiosity ==
Curiosity was the first rover landed using the sky crane maneuver. Following the parachute braking, at about 1.8 km (1.1 mi) altitude, still travelling at about 100 m/s (220 mph; 360 km/h), the rover and descent stage dropped out of the aeroshell. The descent stage is a platform above the rover with eight variable thrust monopropellant hydrazine rocket thrusters on arms extending around this platform to slow the descent. Each rocket thruster, called a Mars Lander Engine (MLE), produces 400 to 3,100 N (90 to 697 lbf) of thrust. A radar altimeter measured altitude and velocity, feeding data to the rover's flight computer. Meanwhile, the rover transformed from its stowed flight configuration to a landing configuration while being lowered beneath the descent stage by the sky crane system.

This system consists of a bridle lowering the rover on three nylon tethers and an electrical cable carrying information and power between the descent stage and rover. As the support and data cables unreeled, the rover's six motorized wheels snapped into position. At roughly 7.5 m (25 ft) below the descent stage the sky crane system slowed to a halt and the rover touched down. After the rover touched down, it waited two seconds to confirm that it was on solid ground by detecting the weight on the wheels and fired several pyrotechnic fasteners activating cable cutters on the bridle and umbilical cords to free itself from the descent stage. The descent stage then flew away to a crash landing 650 m (2,100 ft) away.

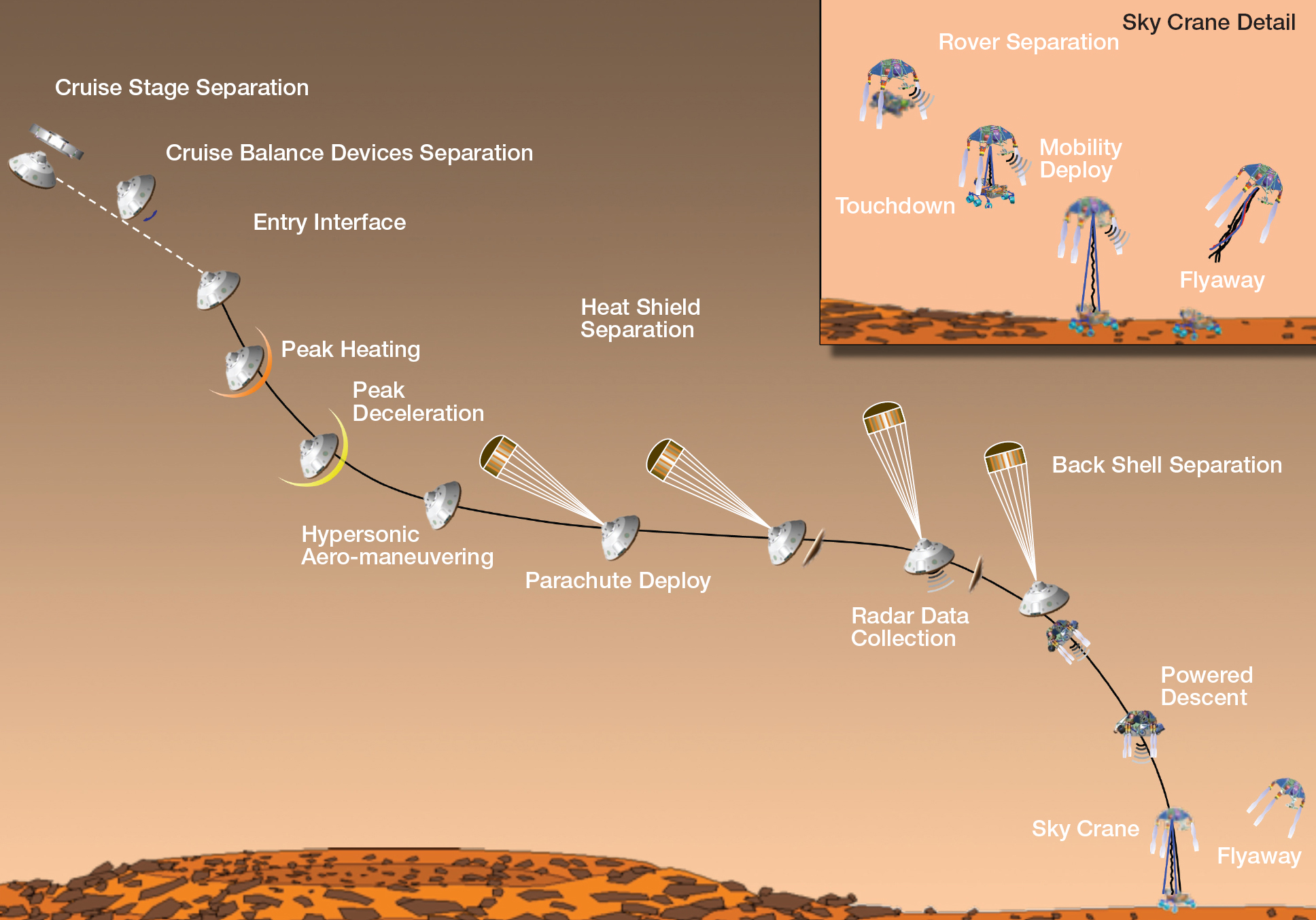
Curiosity EDL profile

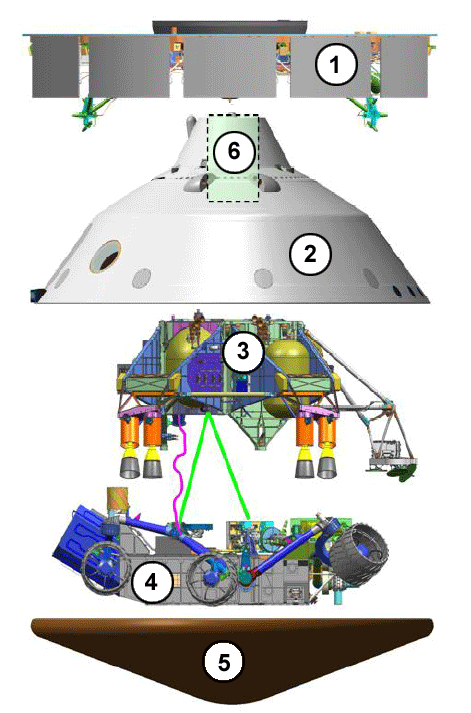
MSL spacecraft exploded view. Sky crane is in the middle(3).

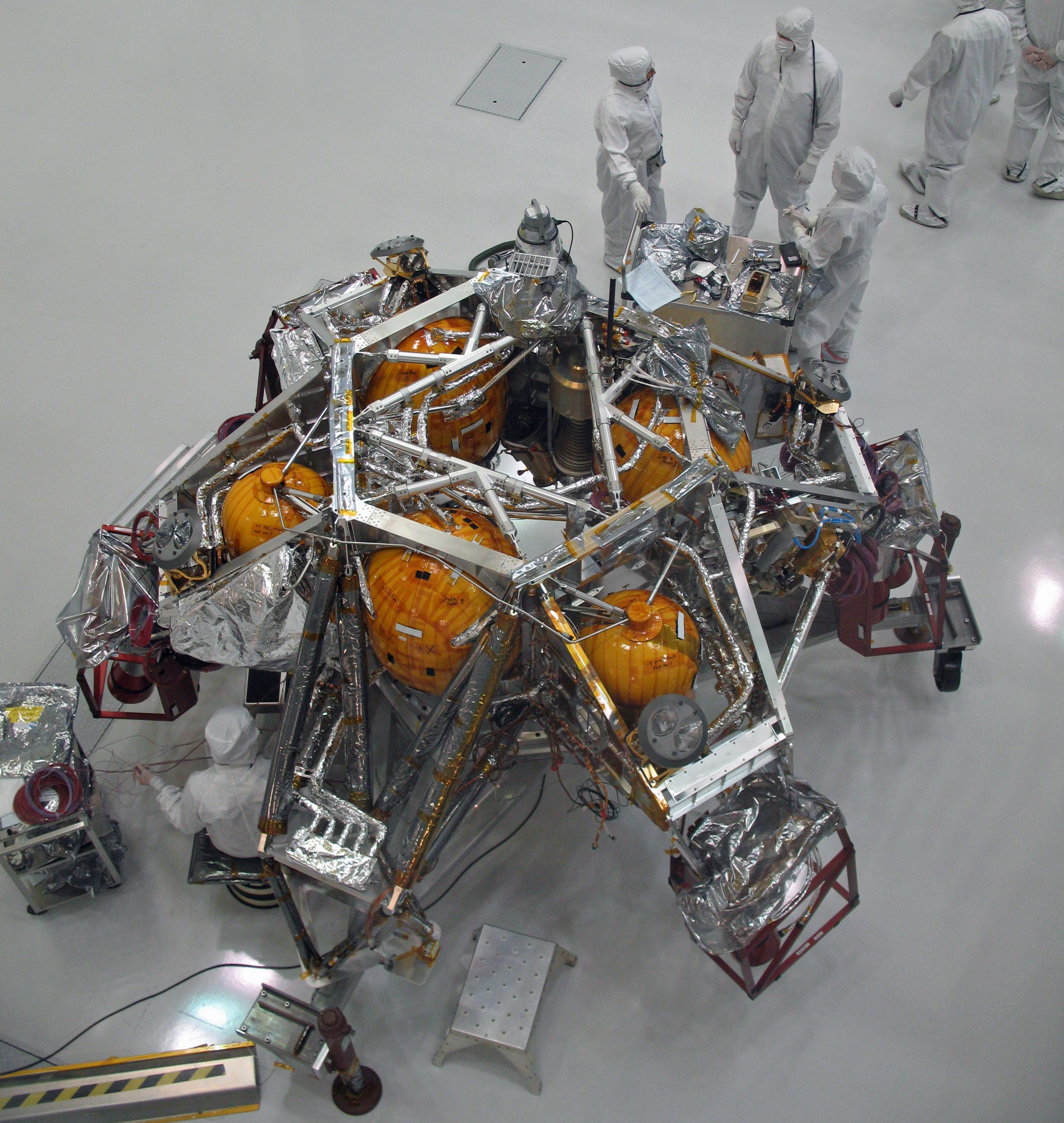
Curiosity sky crane at the JPL

Curiosity's Seven Minutes of Terror

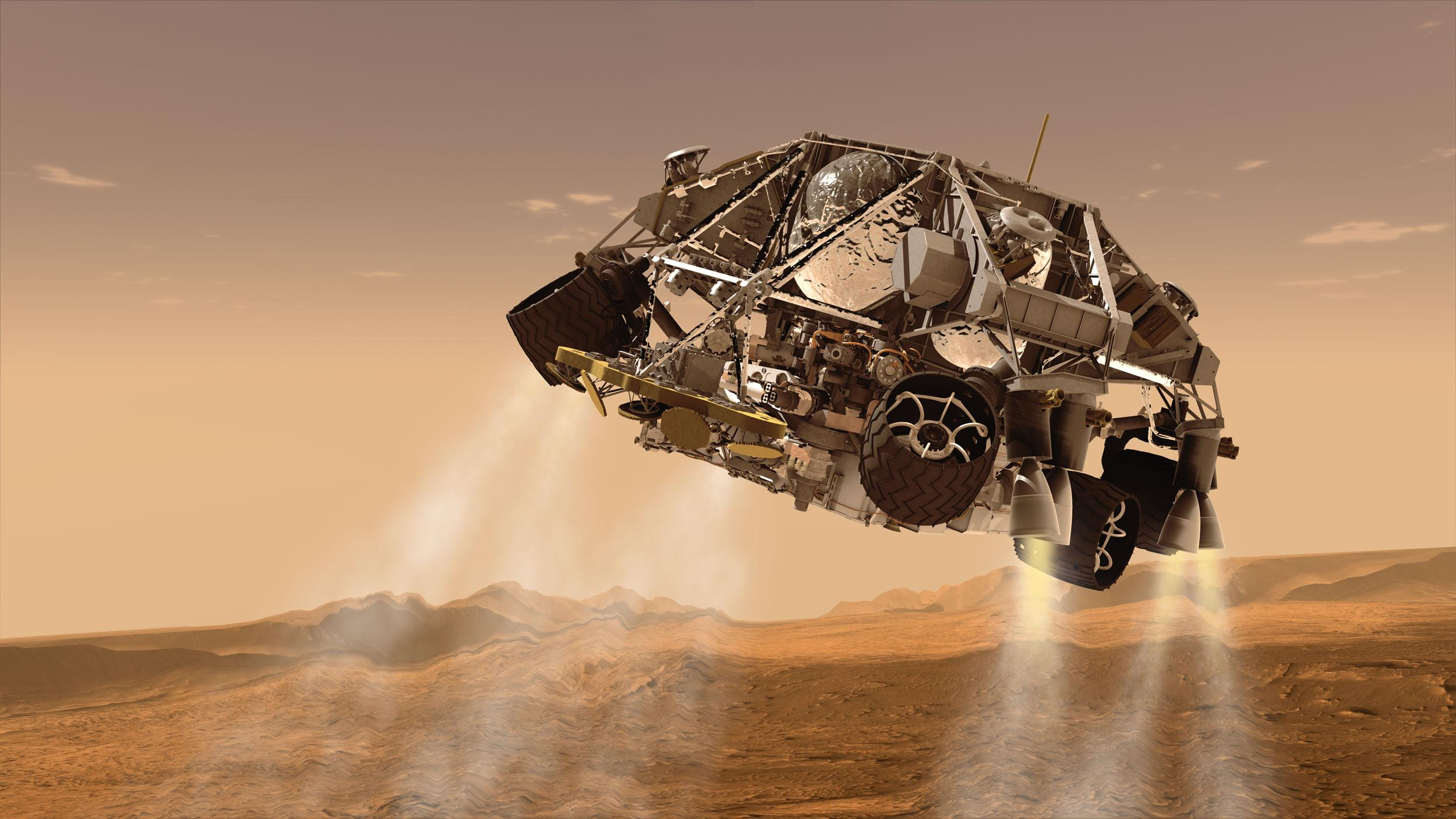
The powered descent stage

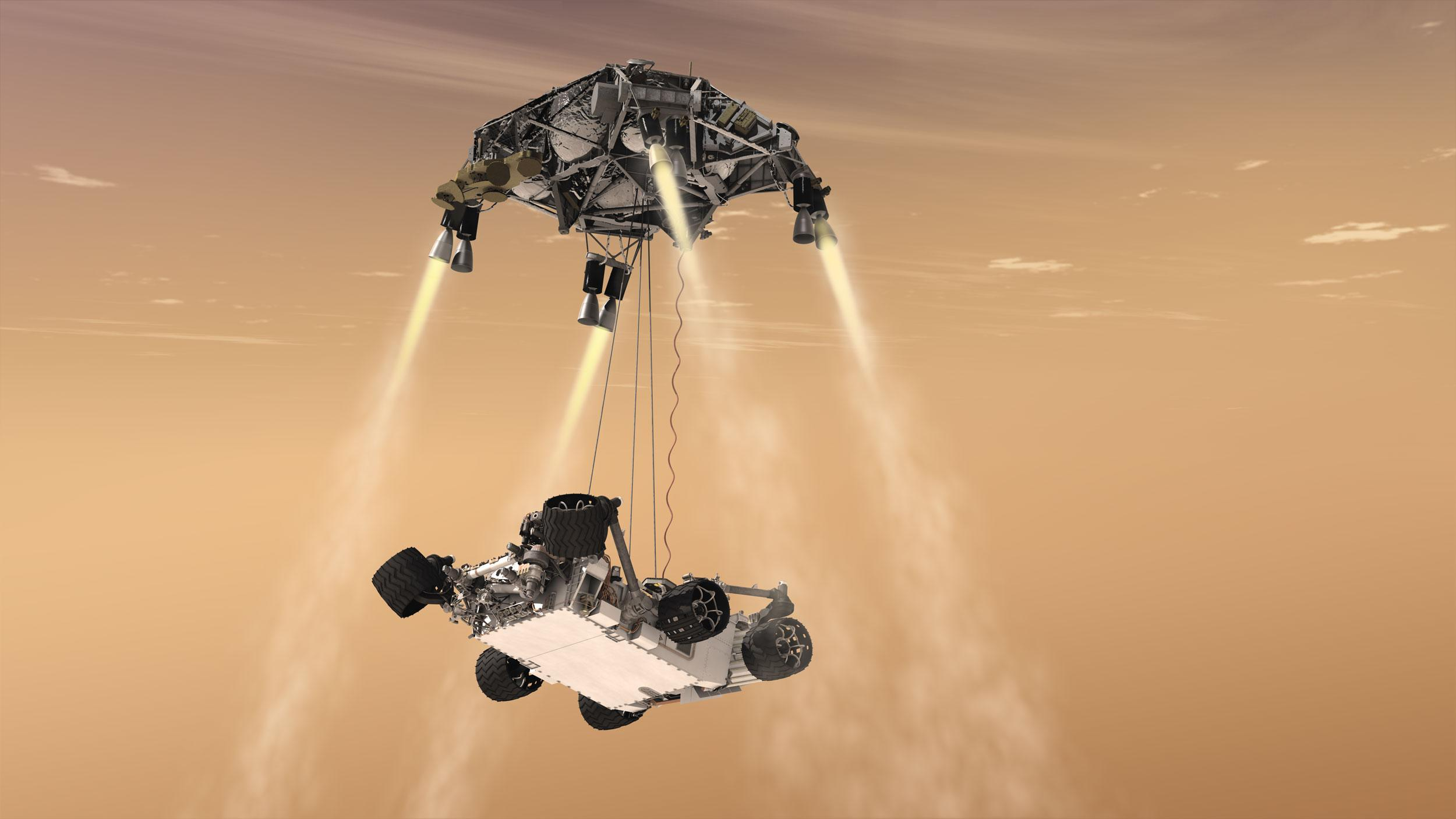
Artist's conception of Curiosity being lowered from the rocket-powered descent stage.

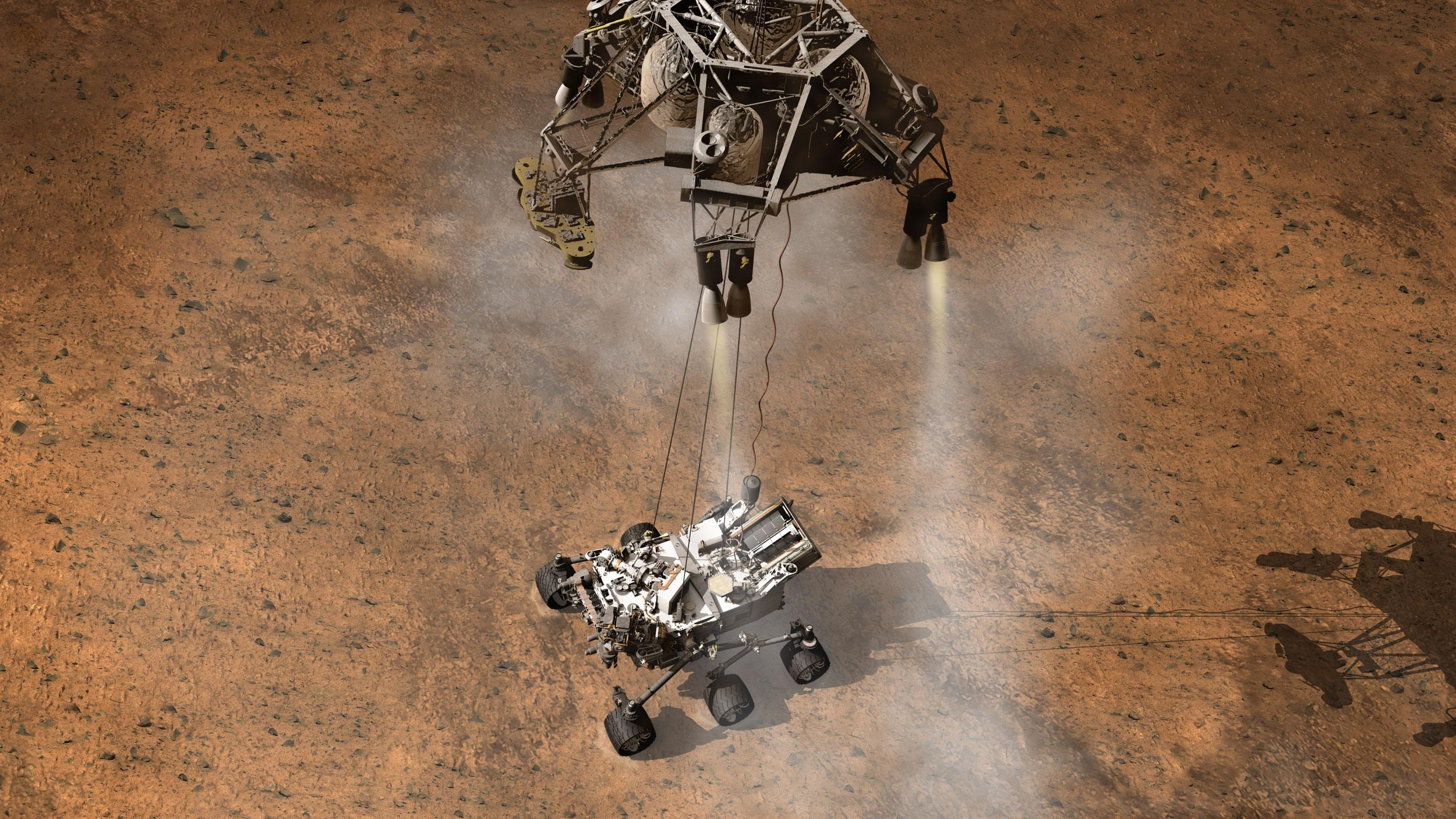
Final stage of the landing before sky crane's separation

== Perseverance ==
The sky crane system was updated for the Perseverance rover weighing 1,025 kg, heavier than its predecessor. During the atmospheric entry, the spacecraft jettisoned the lower heat shield and deployed a parachute from the backshell to slow the descent to a controlled speed. It happens about 240 seconds after entry, at an altitude of about 7 miles (11 kilometers) and a velocity of about 940 mph (1,512 kph). The EDL got new Terrain-Relative Navigation technology, that uses a special camera to quickly identify features on the surface. It is then compared to an onboard map to determine exactly where the rover is heading. Mission team members have mapped in advance the safest areas of the landing zone. If Perseverance can tell that it's headed for more hazardous terrain, it picks the safest spot it can reach and gets ready for the next step. With the craft moving under 320 km/h (200 mph; 89 m/s) and about 1.9 km (1.2 mi) from the surface, the rover and sky crane assembly detached from the backshell, and rockets on the sky crane controlled the remaining descent to the planet. As the descent stage levels out and slows to its final descent speed of about 1.7 miles per hour (2.7 kilometers per hour), it initiates the sky crane maneuver. With about 12 seconds before touchdown, at about 66 feet (20 meters) above the surface, the descent stage lowers the rover on a set of cables about 21 feet (6.4 meters) long until it confirmed touchdown, detached the cables, and flew a distance away to avoid damaging the rover. Meanwhile, the rover unstows its mobility system, locking its legs and wheels into landing position.

Perseverance successfully landed on the surface of Mars on 18 February 2021 at 20:55 UTC. Ingenuity reported back to NASA via the communications systems on Perseverance the following day, confirming its status. NASA also confirmed that the on-board microphone on Perseverance had survived EDL, along with other high-end visual recording devices, and released the first audio recorded on the surface of Mars shortly after landing, capturing the sounds of Martian wind.

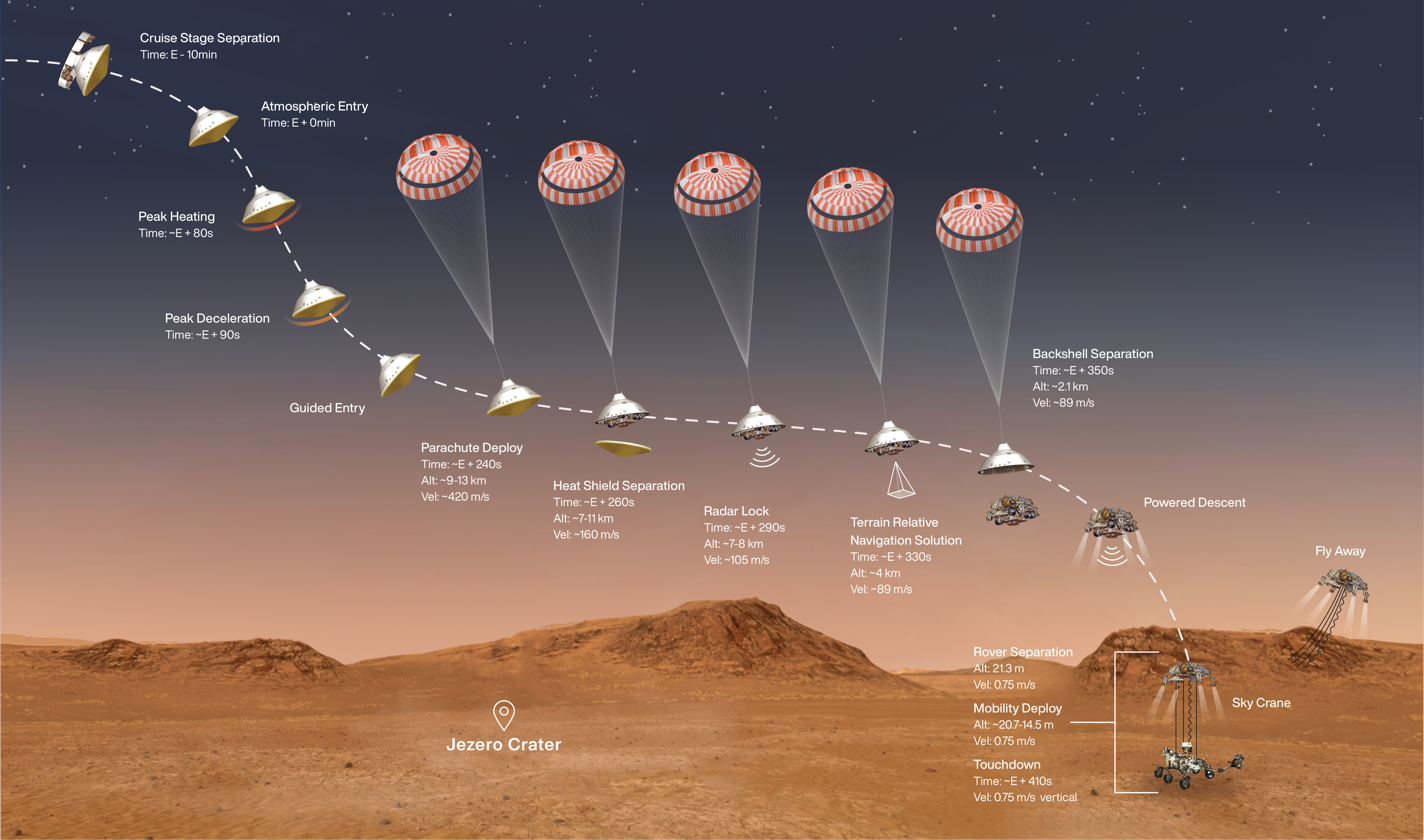
Perseverance EDL Profile

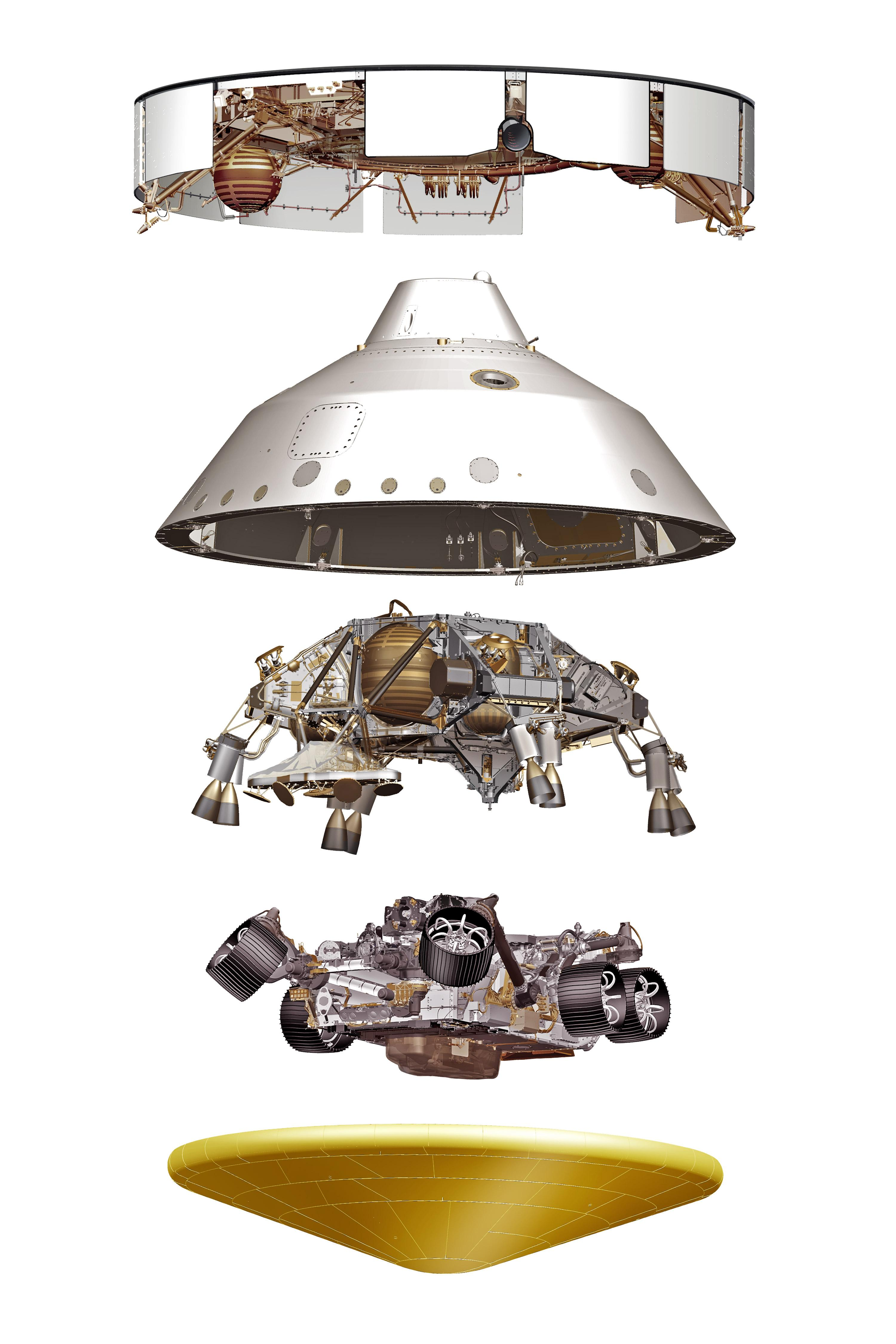
Mars 2020 expanded illustration. Sky crane is in the middle.

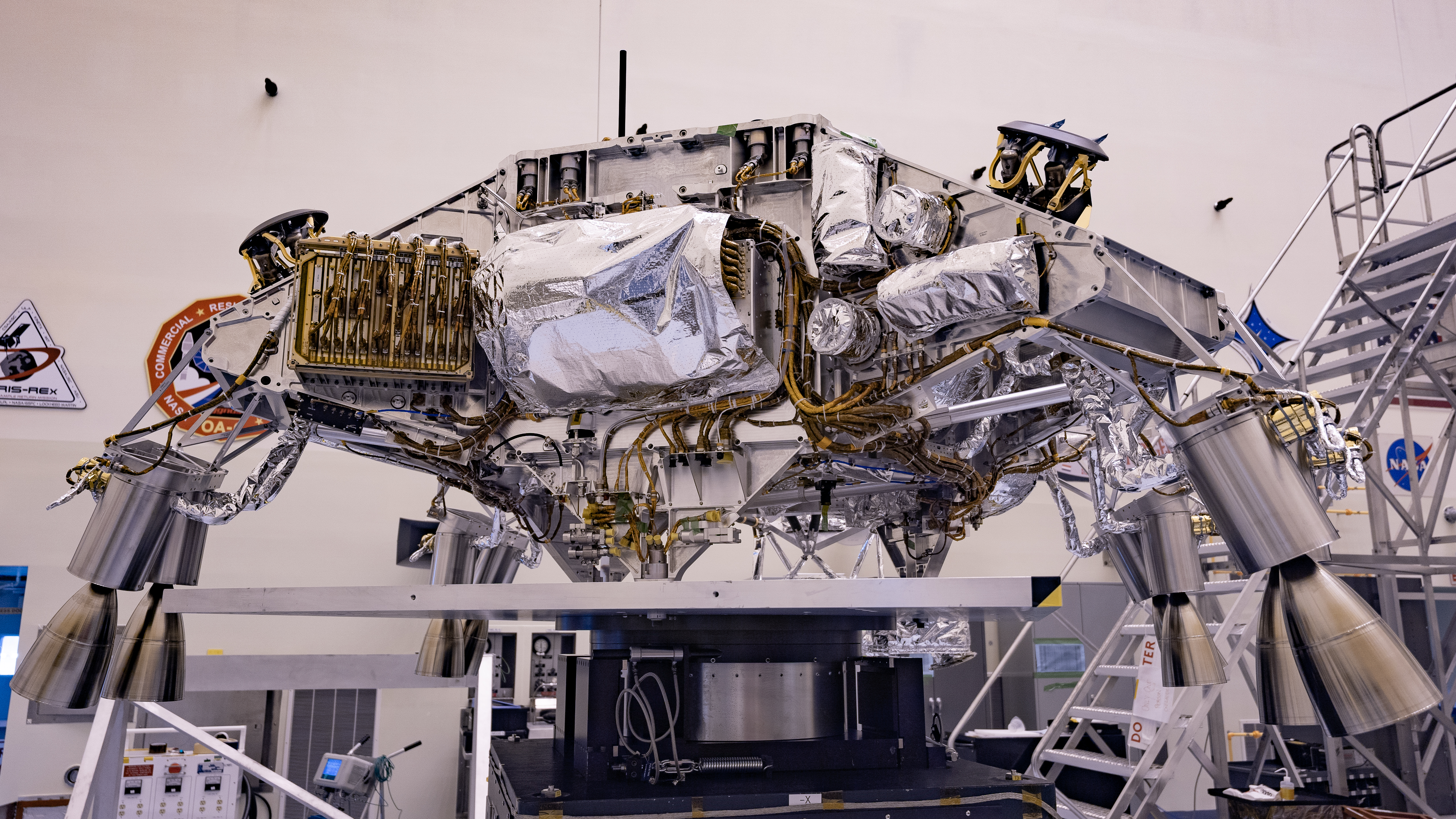
Perseverance sky crane

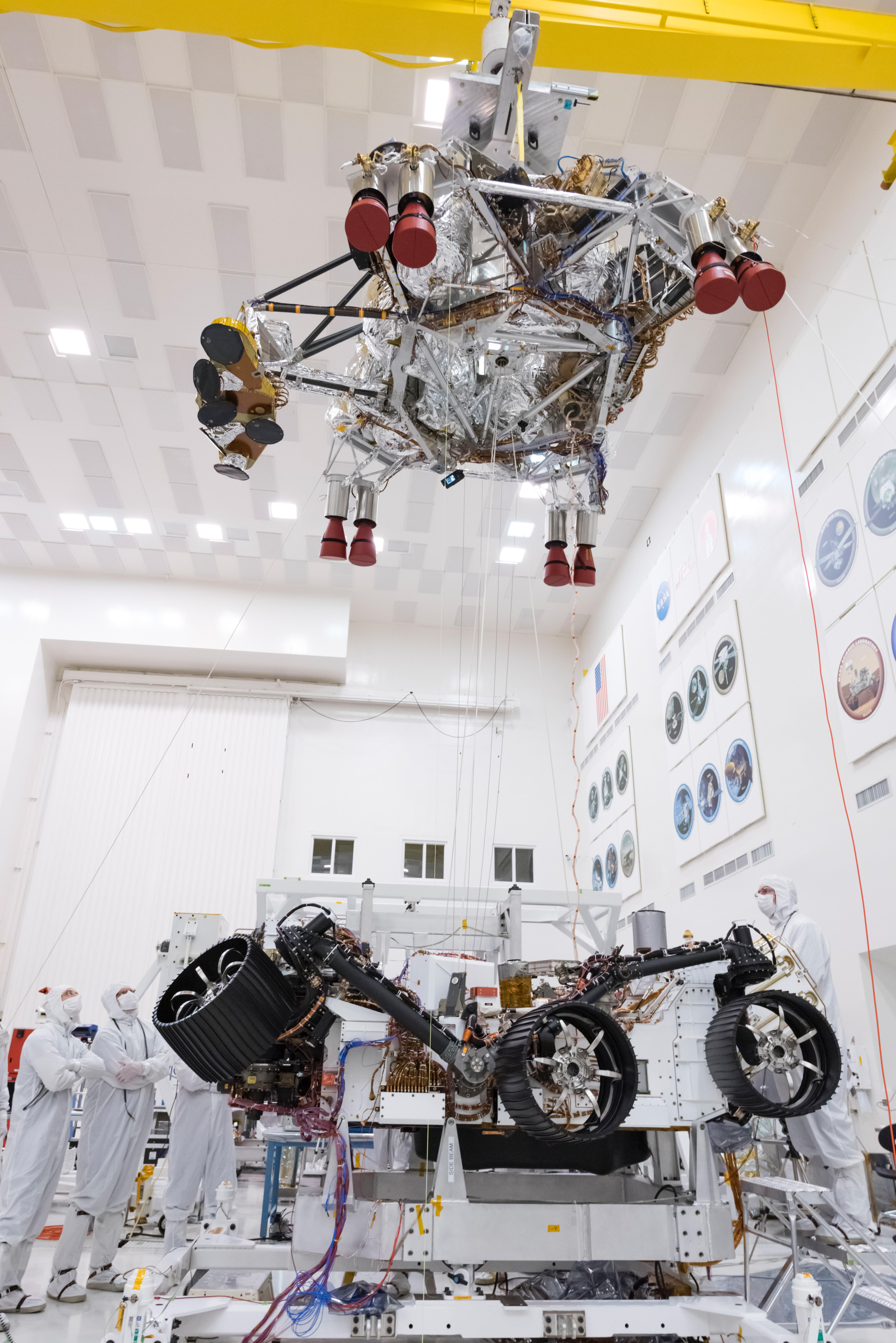
Sky crane separation test

Perseverance descent and touchdown on Mars (onboard camera views)

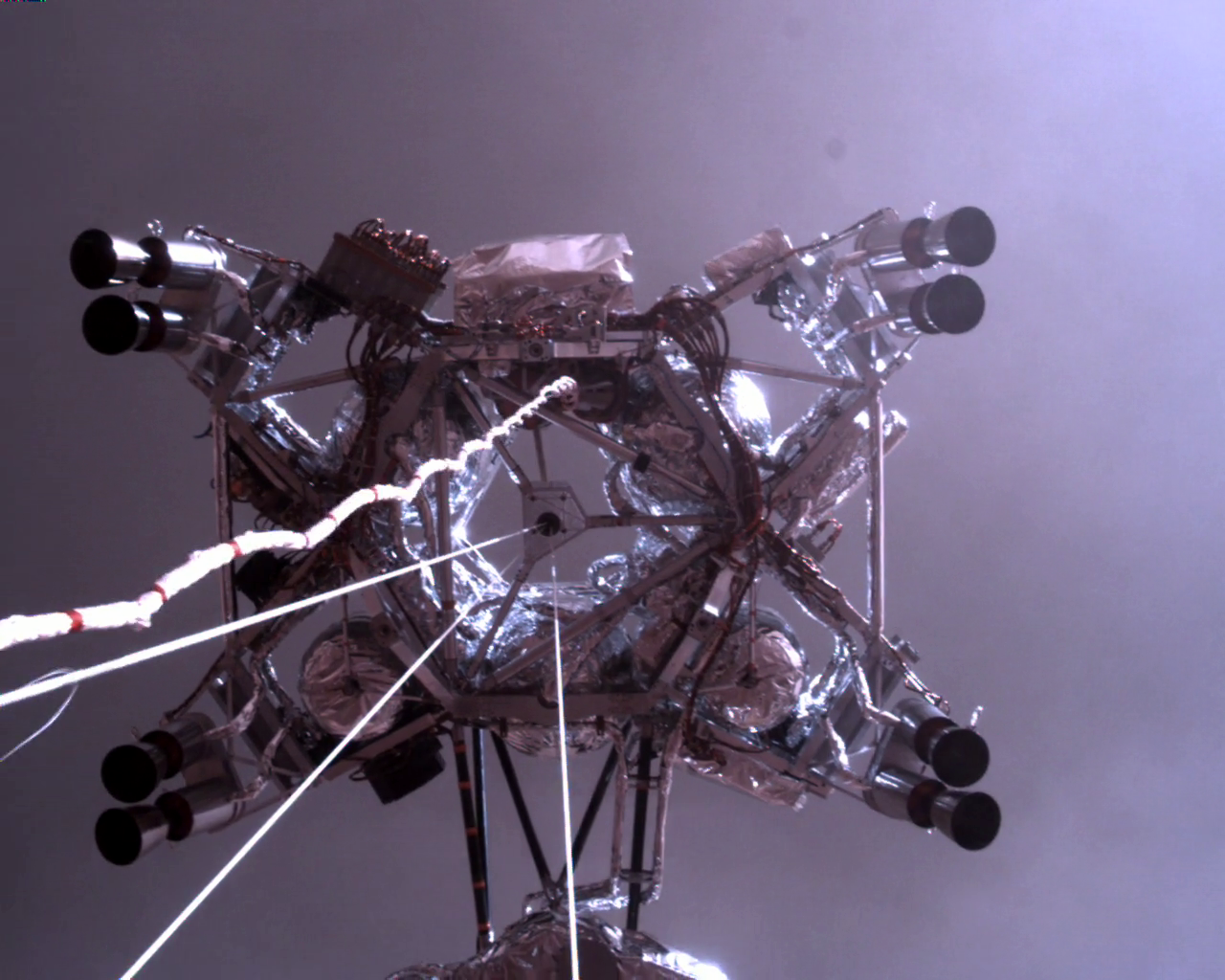
The sky crane photographed from the rover during descent

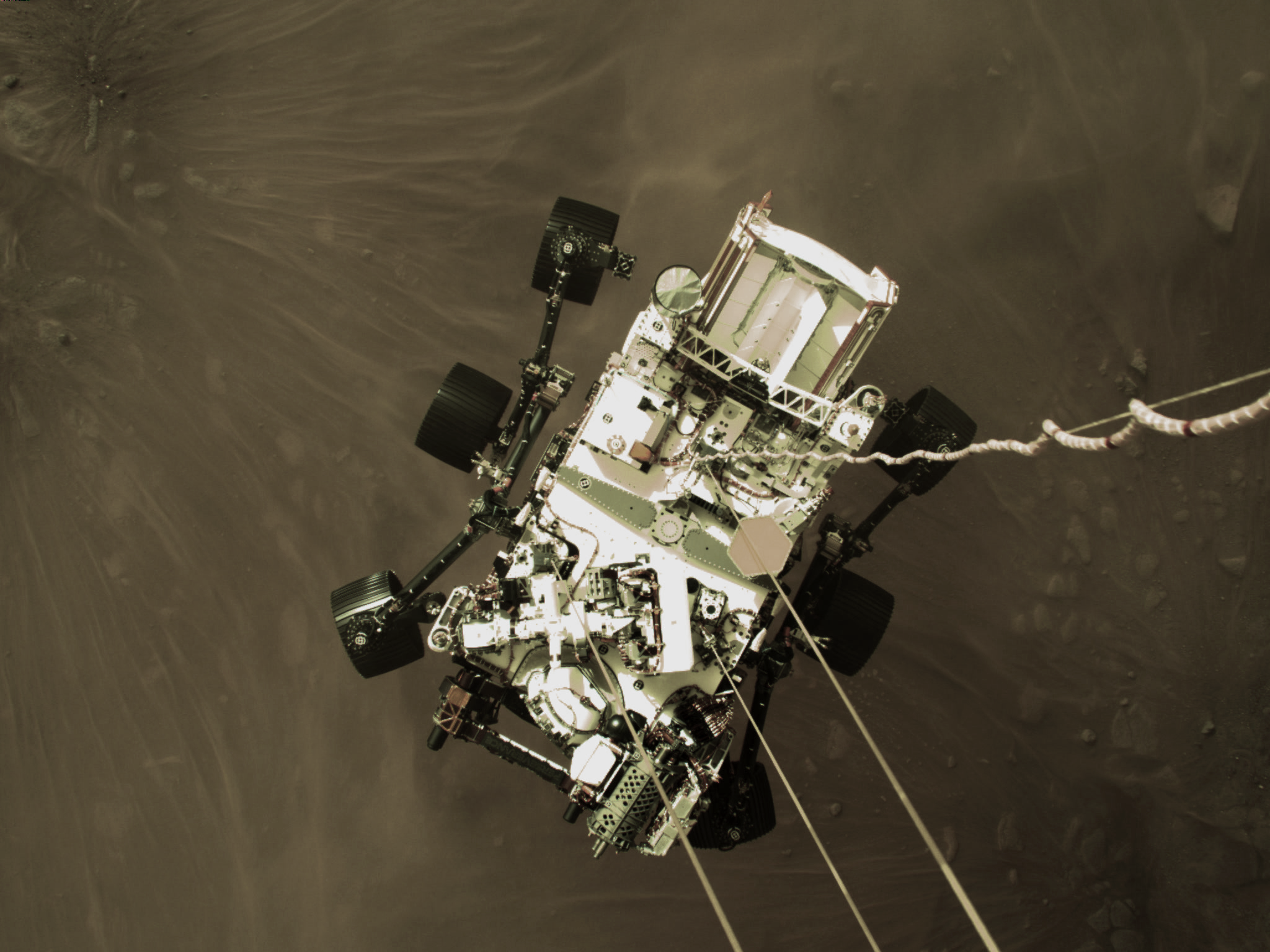
The rover photographed from the sky crane during descent

== Future missions ==
Sky crane was proposed for the future NASA-ESA Mars Sample Return mission, and for the Indian Mars Lander Mission.
