= New Millennium Program =

NASA projects to test new space technologies

New Millennium Program (NMP) was a NASA project with focus on engineering validation of new technologies for space applications. Funding for the program was eliminated from the FY2009 budget by the 110th United States Congress, effectively leading to its cancellation.

The spacecraft in the New Millennium Program were originally named "Deep Space" (for missions demonstrating technology for planetary missions) and "Earth Observing" (for missions demonstrating technology for Earth orbiting missions). With a refocussing of the program in 2000, the Deep Space series was renamed "Space Technology".

== NMP missions ==
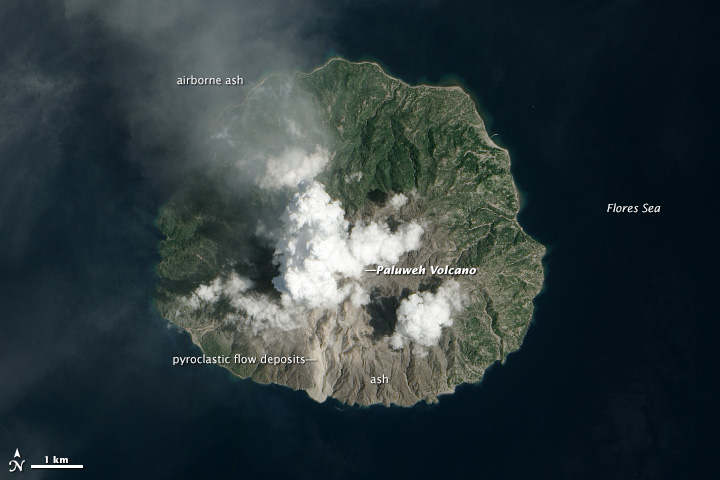
Earth Observing-1 captured this view of a volcano

=== Missions flown ===
- Deep Space 1 – standalone spacecraft testing solar electric propulsion, autonomous operation etc.; successful mission 1998-2001 including comet and asteroid encounters
- Deep Space 2 – Mars surface penetrators flown with Mars Polar Lander in 1999; (failed)
- Earth Observing 1 (EO-1) – (launched 2000)
- Space Technology 5 – a cluster of three satellites investigating the Earth's magnetosphere (launched 2006)
- Space Technology 6 – Autonomous Sciencecraft Experiment (autonomy) aboard Earth Observing 1 (see above); Inertial Stellar Compass (navigation) (launched)
- Space Technology 7 – disturbance reduction technology to support gravitational wave observations; (transferred to Physics of the Cosmos). Launched on the European Space Agency's LISA Pathfinder on 3 December 2015.

=== Cancelled missions ===
- Deep Space 3/Space Technology 3 (StarLight) – would have been a spaceborne stellar interferometer.
- Deep Space 4/Space Technology 4 (Champollion) – planned for launch in 2003 to orbit and land on comet Tempel 1 and return a sample in 2010 (cancelled 1999)
- Earth Observing 2 – a plan to use space-based lidar to measure atmospheric winds (cancelled 1998)
- Earth Observing 3 (GIFTS) – Geostationary Imaging Fourier Transform Spectrometer originally planned for 2005-6 launch (cancelled)
- Space Technology 8 – originally planned for 2009 launch, the satellite is designed, developed and manufacture by Orbital Sciences Corporation (cancelled)
- Space Technology 9 – a NASA proposal related to precision landing and hazard avoidance for future planetary lander vehicles.
