= Earth Observing-3 =

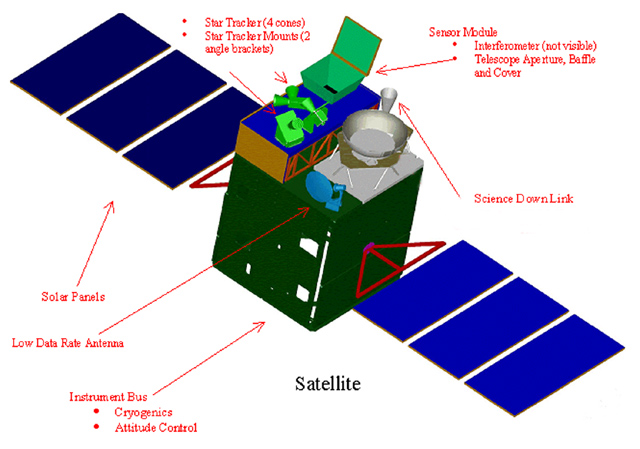
- Operator: NASA / Langley Research Center
- Website: nmp.jpl.nasa.gov/eo3

Spacecraft properties
- Bus: TRW T-310
- Manufacturer: NOAA; Office of Naval Research; Space Dynamics Laboratory
- Launch mass: 1,805 kilograms (3,979 lb)
- Power: 320 watts

Start of mission
- Launch date: Cancelled; Planned for 2005-06
- Rocket: Delta II
- Launch site: Cape Canaveral SLC-17

Instruments
- GIFTS-IOMI

Earth Observing 3 (EO3) was a proposed joint mission between NASA New Millennium Program and the US Navy's Office of Naval Research. Geosynchronous Imaging Fourier Transform Spectrometer — Indian Ocean METOC Imager (GIFTS-IOMI) was the instrument selected by NASA to perform as EO3's latest weather satellite observing instrument. The EO3 project ended with the cancellation of NMP in 2008.
