= Inertial Stellar Compass =

Spacecraft navigation system

- Function: Advanced spacecraft navigation system for attitude determination and orientation recovery

Properties
- Mass: 2.5 kg
- Power consumption: 3.5 W

Inertial Stellar Compass (ISC) was a proposed instrument for an advanced navigation system designed to allow spacecraft to operate more autonomously by enabling precise attitude determination with an accuracy of better than 0.1 degrees across all three axes. It also provides the capability to recover orientation after a power loss.

The ISC is small in size and consumes low power to operate. The ISC was developed by NASA as part of New Millennium program's Space Technology 6 project in collaboration with Charles Stark Draper Laboratory.

The instrument functions with a combination of a miniaturized star tracker and gyroscopes. It uses a wide field-of-view active pixel star camera and a micro electromechanical system to determine the real-time stellar attitude (orientation) of the spacecraft. It has a mass of 2.5 kg (5.5 lb) and requires 3.5 W power.

In 2007, it was successfully deployed and fully operational in space aboard the TacSat-2 spacecraft.

As the New Millennium Program had its budget cancelled in 2009, it is unclear whether development of this instrument is ongoing.
