= List of landing ellipses on extraterrestrial bodies =

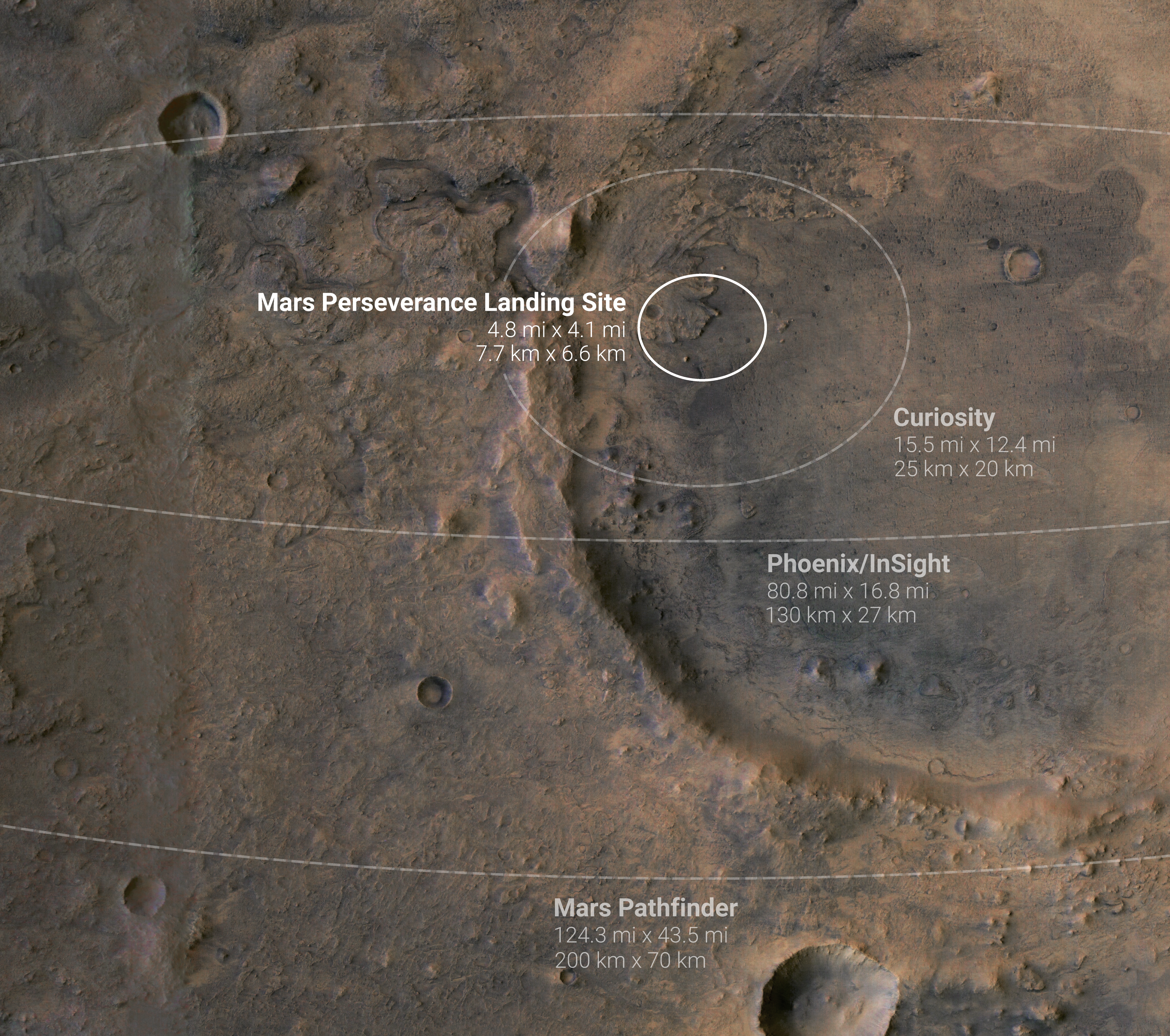
Comparison of landing ellipses of NASA Mars landers in 1997, 2008, 2012, and 2021, respectively.

Shaded ellipses of Skylab's reentry on 1979-07-11. Included for purposes of comparison.

Deorbit of Mir, 23 March 2001. The debris field (in red) is ±1,500 x ±100 km, smaller than predicted due atmospheric reentry being slightly steeper than anticipated

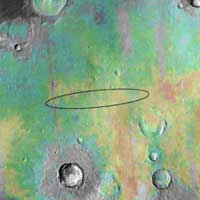
The 150 x 20 km landing footprint of Opportunity rover on Meridiani Planum, Mars in 2004

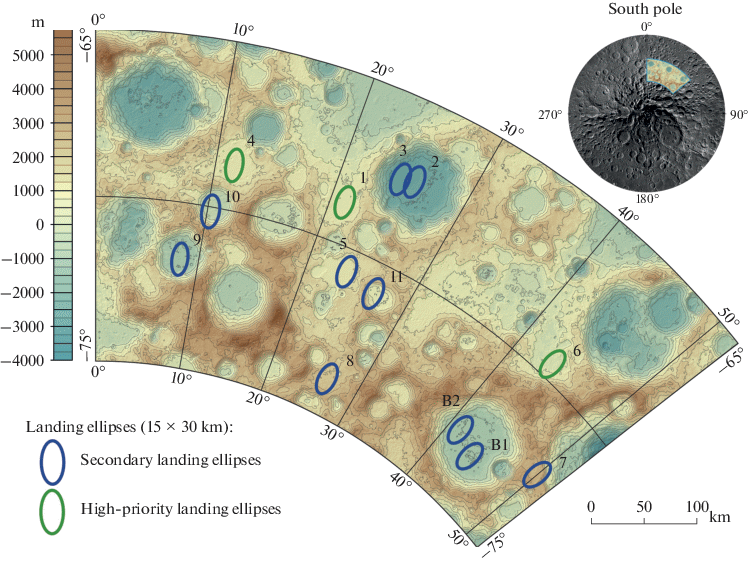
Suggested landing ellipses for Luna-25. Primary ellipses are 1, 4, 6 and secondary ellipses are 2, 3, 5, 7, 8, 9, 10, 11 and B1, B2.

This is a list of the projected landing zones on extraterrestrial bodies. The size of the ellipse or oval graphically represents statistical degrees of uncertainty, i.e. the confidence level of the landing point, with the center of the ellipse being calculated as the most likely given the plethora of variables. Their accuracy has improved from the early attempts in the 1960s; active research continues in the 21st century.

== Ellipse table ==
Mission	Country/Agency	Destination	Date of Impact/Landing	Axes	Notes
Surveyor 1	(United States) NASA	Moon	1966	50 km	Landing error ~18.96 km
Surveyor 3	(United States) NASA	Moon	1967	15.1 x 10.6 km	Initial landing ellipse was 30 km, was corrected in-flight after midcourse correction. Landing error ~2.76 km
Apollo 11	(United States) NASA	Moon	1969	18.5 x 4.8 km	First crewed landing. Landing error ~6.6 km
Apollo 12	(United States) NASA	Moon	1969	~1 km, or 13.3 x 4.8 km (Note: 7.2 nautical miles (13.3 km) x 2.6 nautical miles (4.8 km) per source)	Second crewed landing. Landing error ~160 m Landed in ~200 m from Surveyor 3, its target. Landing was very precise and not intended to be closer.
Apollo 14	(United States) NASA	Moon	1971	~1 km	
Apollo 15	(United States) NASA	Moon	1971	~1 km	
Apollo 16	(United States) NASA	Moon	1972	~1 km	
Apollo 17	(United States) NASA	Moon	1972	~1 km, or 15 x 5 km	Last crewed landing. Landing error ~400 m
Viking	(United States) NASA	Mars	1976	280 x 100 km	Retrorocket
n/a	Shoemaker-Levy 9 (comet)	Jupiter	1994-07-16	n/a	As per IAUC in 1993 May 22; 0.0003 AU (45,000 km) from the center of Jupiter, i.e. within the planet's radius of 0.0005 AU (69,911 km) on 1994 July 25.4. (sic) Actual train of impacts as finally projected occurred beyond Jupiter's limb. Included for purposes of comparison.
Mars Pathfinder	(United States) NASA	Mars	1997	200 x 70 km or 200 x 100 km	Airbags
Mars Polar Lander	(United States) NASA	Mars	1999	200 x 20 km	Communications failed before landing attempt.
Mars Exploration Rovers	(United States) NASA	Mars	2003	150 x 20 km	Airbags
Beagle 2	(European Union) ESA	Mars	2003	174 x 106 km	Successful landing, communications failure.
Huygens	(European Union) ESA	Titan	2005	1200 x 200 km	
Phoenix	(United States) NASA	Mars	2008	100 x 19 km or "70 km long"	
Mars Science Laboratory	(United States) NASA	Mars	2012	25 x 20 km	Sky crane
Chang'e 3	(China) CNSA	Moon	2013	6 x 6 km	Landed with a landing error of ~89 m, 2 m targeting precision
Philae	(European Union) ESA	67P/Churyumov–Gerasimenko	2014	0.5 km	
Falcon 9 first-stage booster	(United States) SpaceX	Earth	2015	~20 m	First reusable rocket, and the most precise landing system to date. Included for comparison.
Schiaparelli EDM	(European Union) ESA	Mars	2016	100 x 15 km	Crash landing.
Cassini	(United States) NASA	Saturn	2017-09-17	TBD	Rotation brought entry area into view.
InSight	(United States) NASA	Mars	2018	130 x 27 km	
Hayabusa2	(Japan) JAXA	162173 Ryugu	2018	2 or 3 m	Sampling occurred in ~1 m from a target.
OSIRIS-REx	(United States) NASA	101955 Bennu	2020	6.5 m	Sampling occurred in ~1 m from a target.
Mars 2020	(United States) NASA	Mars	2021	7.7 x 6.6 km	Sky crane. Landed 1.7 km from center of ellipse.
Tianwen-1	(China) CNSA	Mars	2021	56 x 22 km	
ExoMars 2020	(European Union) (Russia) ESA/Roscosmos	Mars	2023	104 x 19 km or 120 x 19 km	Mission postponed until 2028.
Luna 25	(Russia) Roscosmos	Moon	2023-08-19	30 x 15 km	Mission failed before landing attempt.
Chandrayaan-3	(India) ISRO	Moon	2023-08-23	4.5 x 2.5 km or 4 x 2.4 km	
OSIRIS-REx return capsule	(United States) NASA	Earth	2023-09-24	30 x 80 km, 14 x 58 km, or 12 x 30 km	Sample return from an asteroid. Capsule landed ~ 8 km from the center.
Peregrine Mission One	(United States) Astrobotic, Inc.	Moon	2024-01-18	24 x 6 km	First U.S. lunar lander built since Apollo Program (1972). Aborted to Point Nemo.
SLIM	(Japan) JAXA	Moon	2024-01-19	100 m	Dubbed "Moon Sniper" for its accuracy (despite having landed upside-down). Landed ~55 m from target point.
IM-1 Nova-C Odysseus	(United States) Intuitive Machines	Moon	2024-02-22		Landed ~1.5 km from the target.
Blue Ghost Mission 1	(United States) Firefly Aerospace	Moon	2025-03-02	100 m	Landed within the ellipse.

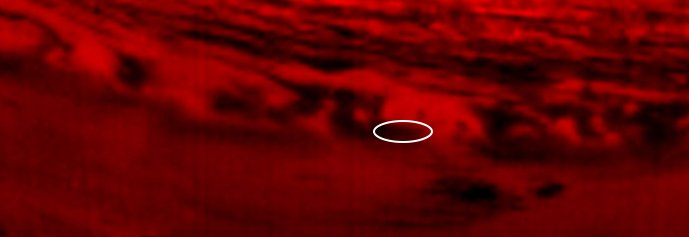
Cassini retirement, Saturn, 9.4°N 15 W, 15 September 2017, at the southern edge of the North Equatorial Belt (itself approximately 15,000 km wide); the blander Equatorial Zone is immediately below.

== See also ==
- Moon landing
- Mars landing
  - Great Galactic Ghoul
- Cone of Uncertainty
- Tropical cyclone forecasting
- Deliberate crash landings on extraterrestrial bodies
