= Champollion (spacecraft) =

Cancelled NASA/CNES mission to explore Comet 9P/Tempel

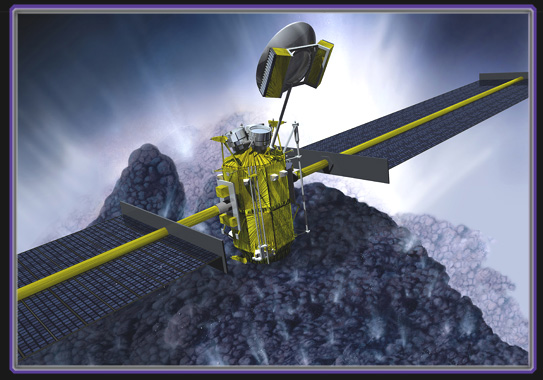
- Single spacecraft concept of Champollion
- Names: Deep Space 4 Space Technology 4
- Mission type: Comet exploration
- Operator: NASA / CNES
- Mission duration: Cancelled

Spacecraft properties
- Launch mass: 1,051 kg (2,317 lb)
- Power: 10,000 watts

Start of mission
- Launch date: April 2003; Planned
- Rocket: Delta II–7925
- Launch site: Cape Canaveral

Rendezvous with 9P/Tempel
- Arrival date: February 2006; Planned

Transponders
- Bandwidth: X-band: 50 kbit/s
Instruments
- CHARGE: Gas Chromatograph/Mass Spectrometer
- CIRCLE: Cameras/Microscope/Infrared Spectrometer
- CIVA: Panoramic Cameras
- CPPP: Comet Physical Properties Probe
- SATM: Drill mechanism
- -: Gamma-ray/Neutron spectrometer

Champollion was a planned cometary rendezvous and landing spacecraft. It was named after Jean-François Champollion, a French Egyptologist known for translating the Rosetta Stone.

== Rosetta surface science package ==
As originally envisaged, the joint NASA/CNES Champollion was to be one of two surface science packages for the Rosetta mission to comet Wirtanen, alongside the German-led RoLand. Champollion was to provide for return of cometary samples to Earth.

This part of the Rosetta mission was withdrawn in late 1996 due to lack of funding from JPL.

== Deep Space 4 / Space Technology 4 ==
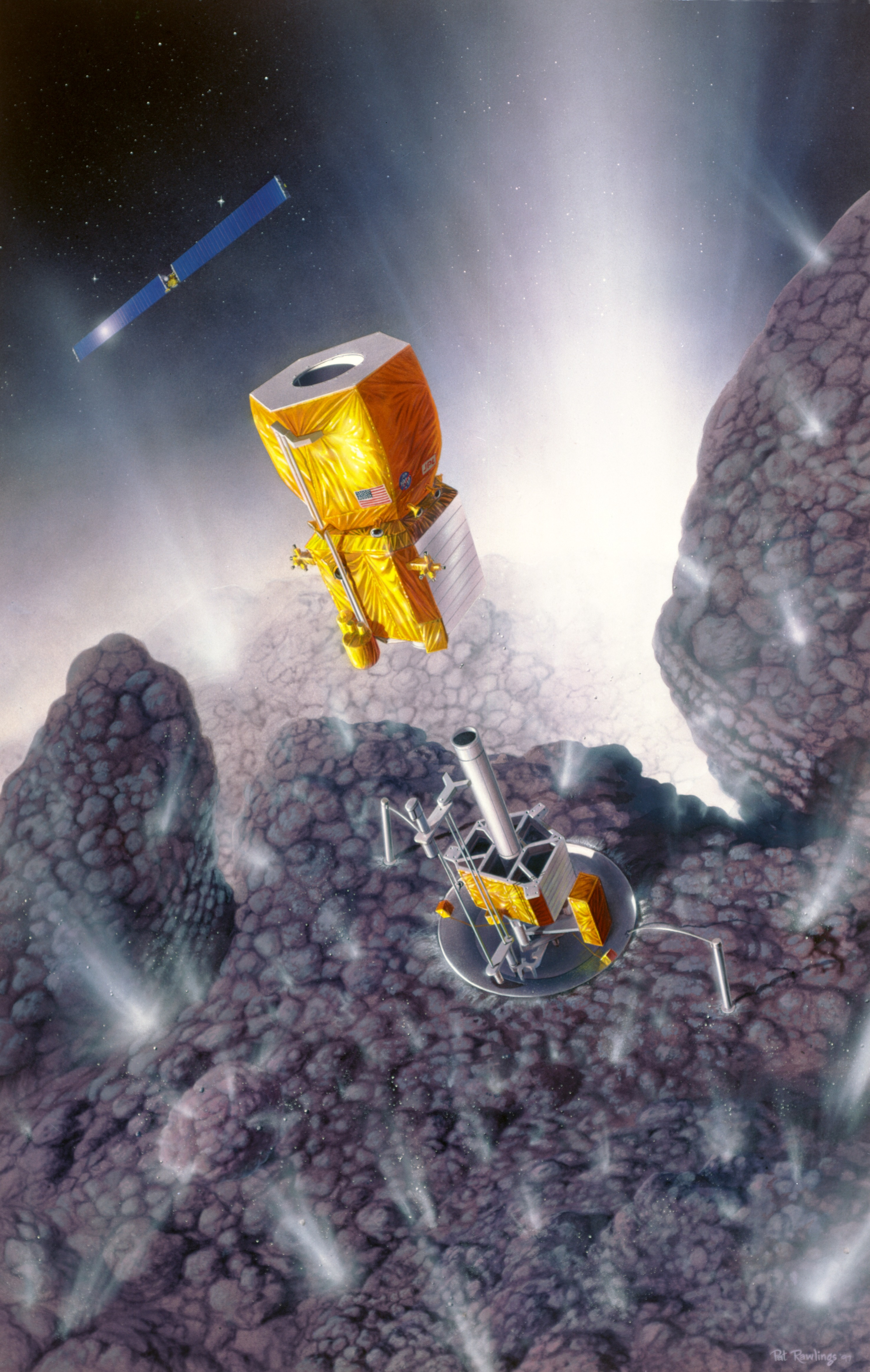
Champollion (original concept)

Champollion was revived under NASA's New Millennium Program as Deep Space 4 / Space Technology 4, again as a joint project of NASA and CNES. In this version, Champollion would be a stand-alone project consisting of an orbiter and a lander, with the focus shifted somewhat to engineering validation of new technologies rather than pure science.

As of March 1999, the baseline mission was to launch in April 2003, reaching comet Tempel 1 in 2006. The sample return element of the mission was at this point contingent on sufficient funding/resources, possibly being replaced with a demonstration of related capabilities.

The lander was approximately 1.5m high weighing 160 kg; it was to autonomously navigate to the comet from 50 km altitude and anchor itself with a spike. The planned payload included:

- CHARGE, a gas chromatograph/mass spectrometer
- CIRCLE, cameras/microscope/IR spectrometer
- CIVA, panoramic cameras
- CPPP, "physical properties probes" to be driven into the cometary surface
- SATM drill mechanism
- gamma ray/neutron spectrometer

The orbiter was to carry cameras and a dust monitor.

Later in 1999, Space Technology 4 was scaled back to a single spacecraft with no sample return; it was cancelled entirely on July 1, 1999, due to budgetary constraints.

== See also ==
- Deep Impact (spacecraft) (Comet impactor mission)
- Stardust (spacecraft) (Comet coma sample-return)
