= Landing footprint =

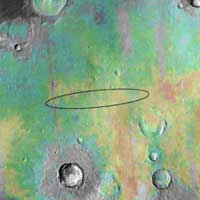
The landing footprint of Opportunity rover on Meridiani Planum, Mars

A landing footprint, also called a landing ellipse, is the area of uncertainty of a spacecraft's landing zone on an astronomical body. After atmospheric entry, the landing point of a spacecraft will depend upon the degree of control (if any), entry angle, entry mass, atmospheric conditions, and drag. (Note that the Moon and the asteroids have no aerial factors.) By aggregating such numerous variables it is possible to model a spacecraft's landing zone to a certain degree of precision. By simulating entry under varying conditions an probable ellipse can be calculated; the size of the ellipse represents the degree of uncertainty for a given confidence interval.

== Mathematical explanation ==
To create a landing footprint for a spacecraft, the standard approach is to use the Monte Carlo method to generate distributions of initial entry conditions and atmospheric parameters, solve the reentry equations of motion, and catalog the final longitude/latitude pair $(\lambda,\phi)$ at touchdown. It is commonly assumed that the resulting distribution of landing sites follows a bivariate Gaussian distribution:

$$f(x) = \frac{1}{2\pi\sqrt{|\Sigma|}} \exp\left[ -\frac{1}{2}(x-\mu)^{T}\Sigma^{-1}(x-\mu) \right]$$

where:

- $x = (\lambda,\phi)$ is the vector containing the longitude/latitude pair
- $\mu$ is the expected value vector
- $\Sigma$ is the covariance matrix
- $|\Sigma|$ denotes the determinant of the covariance matrix

Once the parameters $(\mu,\Sigma)$ are estimated from the numerical simulations, an ellipse can be calculated for a percentile $p$. It is known that for a real-valued vector $x\in\mathbb{R}^{n}$ with a multivariate Gaussian joint distribution, the square of the Mahalanobis distance has a chi-squared distribution with $n$ degrees of freedom:

$$(x-\mu)^{T}\Sigma^{-1}(x-\mu) \sim \chi_{n}^{2}$$

This can be seen by defining the vector $z = \Sigma^{-1/2}(x-\mu)$, which leads to $Q = z_{1}^{2}+\cdots+z_{n}^{2}$ and is the definition of the chi-squared statistic used to construct the resulting distribution. So for the bivariate Gaussian distribution, the boundary of the ellipse at a given percentile is $z^{T}z = \chi_{2}^{2}(p)$. This is the equation of a circle centered at the origin with radius $\sqrt{\chi_{2}^{2}(p)}$, leading to the equations:

$$z = \sqrt{\chi_{2}^{2}(p)} \begin{pmatrix} \cos \theta \\ \sin \theta \end{pmatrix} \Rightarrow x(\theta) = \mu + \sqrt{\chi_{2}^{2}(p)} \Sigma^{1/2} \begin{pmatrix} \cos \theta \\ \sin \theta \end{pmatrix}$$

where $\theta\in[0,2\pi)$ is the angle. The matrix square root $\Sigma^{1/2}$ can be found from the eigenvalue decomposition of the covariance matrix, from which $\Sigma$ can be written as:

$$\Sigma = V \Lambda V^{T} \implies \Sigma^{1/2} = V \Lambda^{1/2} V^{T}$$

where the eigenvalues lie on the diagonal of $\Lambda$. The values of $x$ then define the landing footprint for a given level of confidence, which is expressed through the choice of percentile.

== See also ==
- List of landing ellipses on extraterrestrial bodies
- Mars landing
- Moon landing
