= 1963 in spaceflight (July–September) =

This is a list of spaceflights launched between July and December 1963. For an overview of the whole year, see 1963 in spaceflight.

== Orbital launches ==
- ← Jan
- Feb
- Mar
- Apr
- May
- Jun
- Jul
- Aug
- Sep
- Oct
- Nov
- Dec →

Date and time (UTC)	Rocket	Flight number	Launch site		LSP	
Date and time (UTC)	Payload (⚀ = CubeSat)	Operator	Orbit	Function	Decay (UTC)	Outcome
Date and time (UTC)	Remarks					
=== July ===
10 July	(Soviet Union) Vostok-2		(Soviet Union) Baikonur Site 1/5		(Soviet Union)	
10 July	(Soviet Union) Zenit-2 №12		Intended: Low Earth	Optical imaging	+2 seconds	Launch failure
10 July	Block B booster failed 1.9 seconds after launch.					
12 July; 20:45:59	(United States) Atlas LV-3A Agena-D		(United States) Point Arguello LC-2-3		(United States) US Air Force	
12 July; 20:45:59	(United States) OPS 1467 (KH-7 1 4001/AFP-206 SV-951)	US Air Force/NRO	Low Earth	Optical imaging	18 July	Successful
12 July; 20:45:59	Maiden flight of Atlas LV-3A Agena-D.					
19 July; 00:00:10	(United States) Thor DM-21 Agena-D		(United States) Vandenberg LC-75-1-1		(United States) US Air Force	
19 July; 00:00:10	(United States) OPS 1266 (KH-4 23/9057)	US Air Force/NRO	Low Earth	Optical imaging	13 August	Successful
19 July; 00:00:10	(United States) SRV 624	US Air Force/NRO	Low Earth	Film return	July	Successful
19 July; 00:00:10	Last flight of carrier rocket as Thor DM-21 Agena-D before being redesignated SLV-2.					
19 July; 03:51:18	(United States) Atlas LV-3A Agena-B		(United States) Point Arguello LC-1-2		(United States) US Air Force	
19 July; 03:51:18	(United States) Midas 9	US Air Force	Medium Earth	Missile defence	In orbit	Successful
19 July; 03:51:18	(United States) Dash 2	US Air Force	Medium Earth	Air density	12 April 1971	Successful
19 July; 03:51:18	(United States) ERS-9 (TRS 4)	US Air Force	Medium Earth	Technology	In orbit	Successful
19 July; 03:51:18	(United States) ERS-10	US Air Force	Medium Earth	Technology	In orbit	Partial launch failure
19 July; 03:51:18	ERS-10 failed to separate.					
26 July; 14:33:00	(United States) Delta B		(United States) Cape Canaveral LC-17A		(United States) US Air Force	
26 July; 14:33:00	(United States) Syncom 2	NASA	Geosynchronous	Communications	In orbit	Successful
26 July; 14:33:00	First spacecraft to be placed into geosynchronous orbit, positioned at 55° West.					
31 July; 00:00:17	(United States) Thrust Augmented Thor SLV-2A Agena-D		(United States) Vandenberg LC-75-1-2		(United States) US Air Force	
31 July; 00:00:17	(United States) OPS 1370 (KH-6 3/8003)	US Air Force/NRO	Low Earth	Optical imaging	12 August	Successful
31 July; 00:00:17	(United States) SRV 614	US Air Force/NRO	Low Earth	Film return	August	Successful
31 July; 00:00:17	Final, and only successful KH-6 flight.					
← Jan; Feb; Mar; Apr; May; Jun; Jul; Aug; Sep; Oct; Nov; Dec →; === August ===
6 August; 06:00	(Soviet Union) Kosmos 63S1		(Soviet Union) Kapustin Yar Mayak-2		(Soviet Union)	
6 August; 06:00	(Soviet Union) Kosmos 19 (DS-P1 №3)		Low Earth	Radar target Technology	30 March 1964	Successful
22 August	(Soviet Union) Kosmos 63S1		(Soviet Union) Kapustin Yar Mayak-2		(Soviet Union)	
22 August	(Soviet Union) DS-A1 №3		Intended: Low Earth	Technology; Radiation	22 August	Launch failure
22 August	First stage malfunctioned.					
25 August; 00:30	(United States) Thrust Augmented Thor SLV-2A Agena-D		(United States) Vandenberg LC-75-3-4		(United States) US Air Force	
25 August; 00:30	(United States) OPS 1419 (KH-4A 1/1001)	US Air Force/NRO	Low Earth	Optical imaging	12 September	Partial spacecraft failure
25 August; 00:30	(United States) SRV 615	US Air Force/NRO	Low Earth	Film return	August	Successful
25 August; 00:30	(United States) SRV 617	US Air Force/NRO	Low Earth	Film return	12 September	Spacecraft failure
25 August; 00:30	First KH-4A mission, some film affected by fog, second SRV not returned.					
29 August; 20:31	(United States) Thor SLV-2 Agena-D		(United States) Vandenberg LC-75-3-5		(United States) US Air Force	
29 August; 20:31	(United States) OPS 1561 (KH-5 9/9058A)	US Air Force/NRO	Low Earth	Optical imaging	7 November	Successful
29 August; 20:31	(United States) SRV 604	US Air Force/NRO	Low Earth	Film return	September	Successful
29 August; 20:31	(United States) LAMPO	US Air Force	Low Earth	Tracking target	29 September	Successful
29 August; 20:31	First flight of Thor SLV-2 Agena-D following redesignation.					
← Jan; Feb; Mar; Apr; May; Jun; Jul; Aug; Sep; Oct; Nov; Dec →; === September ===
6 September; 19:30:18	(United States) Atlas LV-3A Agena-D		(United States) Point Arguello LC-2-3		(United States) US Air Force	
6 September; 19:30:18	(United States) OPS 1947 (KH-7 2/4002/AFP-206 SV-952)	US Air Force/NRO	Low Earth	Optical imaging	8 September	Successful
23 September; 23:00	(United States) Thrust Augmented Thor SLV-2A Agena-D		(United States) Vandenberg LC-75-1-2		(United States) US Air Force	
23 September; 23:00	(United States) OPS 1353 (KH-4A 2/1002)	US Air Force/NRO	Low Earth	Optical imaging	12 October	Partial spacecraft failure
23 September; 23:00	(United States) SRV 619	US Air Force/NRO	Low Earth	Film return	September	Successful
23 September; 23:00	(United States) SRV 620	US Air Force/NRO	Low Earth	Film return	12 October	Spacecraft failure
23 September; 23:00	Film severely affected by light leaks, second SRV not recovered.					
27 September; 11:17:49	(United States) Scout X-2B		(United States) Point Arguello LC-D		(United States) US Air Force	
27 September; 11:17:49	(United States) OPS 1610 (DSAP-1 F5 F3/P-35 5/AF-5)	US Air Force	Intended: Low Earth	Weather	27 September	Launch failure
27 September; 11:17:49	Only flight of Scout X-2B, failed to orbit.					
28 September; 20:22	(United States) Thor DSV-2A Ablestar		(United States) Vandenberg LC-75-1-1		(United States) US Air Force	
28 September; 20:22	(United States) Transit 5BN-1	US Navy	Low Earth	Navigation	In orbit	Partial spacecraft failure
28 September; 20:22	(United States) Transit 5E-1	US Navy	Low Earth	Radiation	In orbit	Successful
28 September; 20:22	Maiden flight of Thor DSV-2A Ablestar, Transit 5BN-1 carried a SNAP-9A nuclear power system, gravity-gradient stabilization system left spacecraft in an inverted orientation, preventing operational use.					
← Jan; Feb; Mar; Apr; May; Jun; Jul; Aug; Sep; Oct; Nov; Dec →
For flights after 30 September, see 1962 in spaceflight (October-December)

== Suborbital launches ==
- ← Jan
- Feb
- Mar
- Apr
- May
- Jun
- Jul
- Aug
- Sep
- Oct
- Nov
- Dec →

Date and time (UTC)	Rocket	Flight number	Launch site		LSP	
Date and time (UTC)	Payload (⚀ = CubeSat)	Operator	Orbit	Function	Decay (UTC)	Outcome
Date and time (UTC)	Remarks					
=== July ===
1 July; 21:43:55	(United States) LGM-30B Minuteman IB		(United States) Cape Canaveral LC-32B		(United States) US Air Force	
1 July; 21:43:55		US Air Force	Suborbital	Missile test	1 July	Successful
1 July; 21:43:55	Apogee: 1,300 kilometres (810 mi)					
1 July	(Canada) Black Brant III		(United States) Point Arguello LC-A		(United States) US Navy	
1 July		US Navy	Suborbital	Test flight	1 July	Successful
1 July	Apogee: 100 kilometres (62 mi)					
1 July	(United States) Nike-Tomahawk 9A		(United States) Barking Sands		(United States) Sandia	
1 July		Sandia	Suborbital	Test flight	1 July	Successful
1 July	Apogee: 250 kilometres (160 mi)					
1 July	(Soviet Union) R-12 Dvina		(Soviet Union) Plesetsk		(Soviet Union) MVS	
1 July		MVS	Suborbital	Missile test	1 July	Successful
1 July	Apogee: 402 kilometres (250 mi)					
1 July	(United States) Nike-Zeus 3		(United States) White Sands LC-38		(United States) US Army	
1 July		US Army	Suborbital	Missile test	1 July	Successful
1 July	Apogee: 200 kilometres (120 mi)					
2 July; 14:18	(United States) Javelin		(United States) Wallops Island		(United States) NASA	
2 July; 14:18		NASA	Suborbital	Ionospheric	2 July	Successful
2 July; 14:18	Apogee: 934 kilometres (580 mi)					
2 July; 16:00:04	(United States) UGM-27 Polaris A2		(United States) USS Lafayette, ETR		(United States) US Navy	
2 July; 16:00:04		US Navy	Suborbital	Missile test	2 July	Successful
2 July; 16:00:04	Apogee: 1,000 kilometres (620 mi)					
2 July; 16:30:03	(United States) UGM-27 Polaris A2		(United States) USS Lafayette, ETR		(United States) US Navy	
2 July; 16:30:03		US Navy	Suborbital	Missile test	2 July	Successful
2 July; 16:30:03	Apogee: 1,000 kilometres (620 mi)					
3 July; 09:00	(United States) Aerobee-150 (Hi)		(United States) Eglin		(United States) US Air Force	
3 July; 09:00		US Air Force	Suborbital	Ionospheric	3 July	Successful
3 July; 09:00	Apogee: 199 kilometres (124 mi)					
3 July; 17:48:03	(United States) UGM-27 Polaris A3		(United States) Cape Canaveral LC-25A		(United States) US Navy	
3 July; 17:48:03		US Navy	Suborbital	Missile test	3 July	Successful
3 July; 17:48:03	Apogee: 1,000 kilometres (620 mi)					
3 July; 21:13:57	(United States) SM-65E Atlas		(United States) Vandenberg LC-576C		(United States) Strategic Air Command	
3 July; 21:13:57		Strategic Air Command	Suborbital	Missile test	3 July	Successful
3 July; 21:13:57	Apogee: 1,600 kilometres (990 mi)					
3 July	(United States) Nike-Tomahawk 9A		(United States) Barking Sands		(United States) Sandia	
3 July		Sandia	Suborbital	Test flight	3 July	Launch failure
3 July	Apogee: 20 kilometres (12 mi)					
3 July	(United States) Nike-Zeus 3		(United States) Kwajalein		(United States) US Army	
3 July		US Army	Suborbital	Missile test	3 July	Successful
3 July	Apogee: 200 kilometres (120 mi)					
3 July	(United States) Nike-Zeus 3		(United States) White Sands LC-38		(United States) US Army	
3 July		US Army	Suborbital	Missile test	3 July	Successful
3 July	Apogee: 200 kilometres (120 mi)					
3 July	(France) Berenice		(France) CERES		(France) ONERA	
3 July		ONERA	Suborbital	REV Test	3 July	Successful
3 July	Apogee: 270 kilometres (170 mi)					
5 July; 21:00	(United States) LGM-30A Minuteman IA		(United States) Vandenberg LC-394A-4		(United States) US Air Force	
5 July; 21:00		US Air Force	Suborbital	Missile test	5 July	Successful
5 July; 21:00	Apogee: 1,300 kilometres (810 mi)					
5 July	(Soviet Union) R-12 Dvina		(Soviet Union) Makat		(Soviet Union) MVS	
5 July		MVS	Suborbital	Missile test	5 July	Successful
5 July	Apogee: 402 kilometres (250 mi)					
6 July; 00:36	(Soviet Union) R-5 Pobeda		(Soviet Union) Plesetsk		(Soviet Union) AN	
6 July; 00:36		AN	Suborbital	Aeronomy	6 July	Successful
6 July; 00:36	Apogee: 400 kilometres (250 mi)					
8 July	(Soviet Union) R-16U		(Soviet Union) Baikonur Site 41/15		(Soviet Union) RVSN	
8 July		RVSN	Suborbital	Missile test	8 July	Successful
8 July	Apogee: 1,210 kilometres (750 mi)					
9 July	(Soviet Union) R-16U		(Soviet Union) Baikonur Site 41/15		(Soviet Union) RVSN	
9 July		RVSN	Suborbital	Missile test	9 July	Successful
9 July	Apogee: 1,210 kilometres (750 mi)					
10 July; 02:46	(United States) Aerobee-150A		(United States) Wallops Island		(United States) NASA	
10 July; 02:46		STAN	Suborbital	Ionospheric	10 July	Successful
10 July; 02:46	Apogee: 204 kilometres (127 mi)					
10 July; 17:02	(United States) Aerobee-150 (Hi)		(United States) White Sands LC-35		(United States) US Air Force	
10 July; 17:02		US Air Force	Suborbital	Solar	10 July	Successful
10 July; 17:02	Apogee: 225 kilometres (140 mi)					
11 July; 23:00	(United States) LGM-30A Minuteman IA		(United States) Vandenberg LC-394A-2		(United States) Strategic Air Command	
11 July; 23:00		Strategic Air Command	Suborbital	Missile test	11 July	Successful
11 July; 23:00	Apogee: 1,300 kilometres (810 mi)					
11 July	(Soviet Union) R-12 Dvina		(Soviet Union) Plesetsk		(Soviet Union) MVS	
11 July		MVS	Suborbital	Missile test	11 July	Successful
11 July	Apogee: 402 kilometres (250 mi)					
12 July	(United States) Nike-Zeus 3		(United States) Kwajalein		(United States) US Army	
12 July		US Army	Suborbital	Missile test	12 July	Successful
12 July	Apogee: 200 kilometres (120 mi)					
14 July; 21:03:28	(United States) Nike-Apache		(Canada) Churchill		(United States) NASA	
14 July; 21:03:28		GCA	Suborbital	Ionospheric	14 July	Successful
14 July; 21:03:28	Apogee: 172 kilometres (107 mi)					
16 July	(United States) HGM-25A Titan I		(United States) Vandenberg LC-395A-2		(United States) Strategic Air Command	
16 July		Strategic Air Command	Suborbital	Missile test	16 July	Successful
16 July	Apogee: 1,000 kilometres (620 mi)					
17 July; 02:30:02	(United States) LGM-30B Minuteman IB		(United States) Cape Canaveral LC-32B		(United States) US Air Force	
17 July; 02:30:02		US Air Force	Suborbital	Missile test	17 July	Launch failure
17 July; 02:30:02	Apogee: 10 kilometres (6.2 mi)					
19 July; 01:00	(United States) UGM-27 Polaris A3		(United States) Cape Canaveral LC-25A		(United States) US Navy	
19 July; 01:00		US Navy	Suborbital	Missile test	19 July	Successful
19 July; 01:00	Apogee: 1,000 kilometres (620 mi)					
19 July; 05:30	(United States) Aerobee-150A		(United States) Wallops Island		(United States) NASA	
19 July; 05:30		NASA	Suborbital	UV Astronomy	19 July	Successful
19 July; 05:30	Apogee: 185 kilometres (115 mi)					
19 July; 18:20:05	(United States) X-15		(United States) Balls 8, Edwards		(United States) US Air Force/NASA	
19 July; 18:20:05	(United States) Flight 90	US Air Force/NASA	Suborbital	Technology	18:31:29	Successful
19 July; 18:20:05	Manned flight with astronaut Joseph Walker, apogee: 106 kilometres (66 mi), first X-15 flight to reach space					
19 July	(Soviet Union) R-12 Dvina		(Soviet Union) Makat		(Soviet Union) MVS	
19 July		MVS	Suborbital	Missile test	19 July	Successful
19 July	Apogee: 402 kilometres (250 mi)					
20 July; 05:44:08	(United States) Scout X-3A		(United States) Wallops Island LA-3		(United States) NASA	
20 July; 05:44:08		NASA	Suborbital	REV Test	20 July	Launch failure
20 July; 05:44:08	Apogee: 2 kilometres (1.2 mi)					
20 July; 15:18	(United States) Aerobee-150 (Hi)		(United States) White Sands LC-35		(United States) NASA	
20 July; 15:18		NASA	Suborbital	Solar	20 July	Successful
20 July; 15:18	Apogee: 213 kilometres (132 mi)					
20 July; 20:00:02	(United States) Nike-Apache		(Canada) Churchill		(United States) NASA	
20 July; 20:00:02		GCA	Suborbital	Ionospheric; Solar	20 July	Launch failure
20 July; 20:00:02	Apogee: 5 kilometres (3.1 mi)					
20 July; 20:30:00	(United States) Nike-Apache		(Canada) Churchill		(United States) NASA	
20 July; 20:30:00		GCA	Suborbital	Ionospheric; Solar	20 July	Launch failure
20 July; 20:30:00	Apogee: 5 kilometres (3.1 mi)					
20 July; 21:03:00	(United States) Nike-Apache		(Canada) Churchill		(United States) NASA	
20 July; 21:03:00		GCA	Suborbital	Ionospheric; Solar	20 July	Successful
20 July; 21:03:00	Apogee: 196 kilometres (122 mi)					
20 July; 21:05	(Canada) Black Brant II		(Canada) Churchill		(United States) US Air Force	
20 July; 21:05		Utah; AFCRL	Suborbital	Solar	20 July	Successful
20 July; 21:05	Apogee: 143 kilometres (89 mi)					
20 July; 21:06	(United States) Aerobee-150 (Hi)		(Canada) Churchill		(United States) NASA	
20 July; 21:06		Johns Hopkins	Suborbital	Aeronomy; Solar	20 July	Launch failure
20 July; 21:06	Apogee: 78 kilometres (48 mi)					
20 July; 21:13:00	(United States) Nike-Apache		(Canada) Churchill		(United States) NASA	
20 July; 21:13:00		GCA	Suborbital	Ionospheric; Solar	20 July	Successful
20 July; 21:13:00	Apogee: 199 kilometres (124 mi)					
20 July; 21:40:00	(United States) Nike-Apache		(Canada) Churchill		(United States) NASA	
20 July; 21:40:00		GCA	Suborbital	Ionospheric; Solar	20 July	Successful
20 July; 21:40:00	Apogee: 200 kilometres (120 mi)					
20 July; 21:54:45	(United States) Aerobee-300A		(United States) Wallops Island		(United States) NASA	
20 July; 21:54:45		Michigan	Suborbital	Aeronomy; Solar	20 July	Successful
20 July; 21:54:45	Apogee: 338 kilometres (210 mi)					
20 July; 22:10:00	(United States) Nike-Apache		(Canada) Churchill		(United States) NASA	
20 July; 22:10:00		GCA	Suborbital	Ionospheric; Solar	20 July	Successful
20 July; 22:10:00	Apogee: 192 kilometres (119 mi)					
23 July; 06:00	(United States) Aerobee-150A		(United States) Wallops Island		(United States) NASA	
23 July; 06:00		NASA	Suborbital	UV Astronomy	23 July	Successful
23 July; 06:00	Apogee: 177 kilometres (110 mi)					
24 July	(Soviet Union) R-9 Desna		(Soviet Union) Baikonur		(Soviet Union) RVSN	
24 July		RVSN	Suborbital	Missile test	24 July	Launch failure
25 July; 03:30:13	(United States) LGM-30B Minuteman IB		(United States) Cape Canaveral LC-31B		(United States) US Air Force	
25 July; 03:30:13		US Air Force	Suborbital	Missile test	25 July	Successful
25 July; 03:30:13	Apogee: 1,300 kilometres (810 mi)					
25 July; 04:59	(United Kingdom) Skylark-7		(Australia) Woomera LA-2		(United Kingdom) RAE	
25 July; 04:59		RAE	Suborbital	Test flight	25 July	Launch failure
25 July; 14:15	(United States) Aerobee-150 (Hi)		(United States) White Sands LC-35		(United States) NRL	
25 July; 14:15		NRL	Suborbital	Solar	25 July	Successful
25 July; 14:15	Apogee: 200 kilometres (120 mi)					
25 July; 22:38	(United States) Exos		(United States) Eglin		(United States) US Air Force	
25 July; 22:38		AFCRL	Suborbital	Ionospheric	25 July	Successful
25 July; 22:38	Apogee: 623 kilometres (387 mi)					
25 July	(Soviet Union) R-12 Dvina		(Soviet Union) Plesetsk		(Soviet Union) RVSN	
25 July		RVSN	Suborbital	Missile test	25 July	Successful
25 July	Apogee: 402 kilometres (250 mi)					
26 July; 19:19:00	(United States) SM-65E Atlas		(United States) Vandenberg OSTF-1		(United States) Strategic Air Command	
26 July; 19:19:00		Strategic Air Command	Suborbital	Missile test	26 July	Launch failure
26 July; 19:19:00	Apogee: 300 kilometres (190 mi)					
26 July; 21:19	(Canada) Black Brant II		(Canada) Churchill		(United States) US Air Force	
26 July; 21:19		Utah; AFCRL	Suborbital	Auroral; Ionospheric	26 July	Successful
26 July; 21:19	Apogee: 143 kilometres (89 mi)					
26 July	(Soviet Union) R-12 Dvina		(Soviet Union) Kapustin Yar		(Soviet Union) MVS	
26 July		MVS	Suborbital	Missile test	26 July	Successful
26 July	Apogee: 402 kilometres (250 mi)					
26 July	(Soviet Union) R-12 Dvina		(Soviet Union) Kapustin Yar		(Soviet Union) MVS	
26 July		MVS	Suborbital	Missile test	26 July	Successful
26 July	Apogee: 402 kilometres (250 mi)					
26 July	(Soviet Union) R-12 Dvina		(Soviet Union) Kapustin Yar		(Soviet Union) MVS	
26 July		MVS	Suborbital	Missile test	26 July	Successful
26 July	Apogee: 402 kilometres (250 mi)					
26 July	(United States) Nike-Zeus 3		(United States) White Sands LC-38		(United States) US Army	
26 July		US Army	Suborbital	Missile test	26 July	Successful
26 July	Apogee: 200 kilometres (120 mi)					
27 July; 00:10	(United States) Nike-Cajun		(Sweden) Kronogard		(Sweden) RTG	
27 July; 00:10		NASA	Suborbital	Aeronomy	27 July	Successful
27 July; 00:10	Apogee: 126 kilometres (78 mi)					
27 July; 04:55:01	(United States) UGM-27 Polaris A3		(United States) Cape Canaveral LC-29A		(United States) US Navy	
27 July; 04:55:01		US Navy	Suborbital	Missile test	27 July	Successful
27 July; 04:55:01	Apogee: 1,000 kilometres (620 mi)					
27 July	(United States) LGM-30A Minuteman IA		(United States) Vandenberg LC-394A-5		(United States) Strategic Air Command	
27 July		Strategic Air Command	Suborbital	Missile test	27 July	Successful
27 July	Apogee: 1,300 kilometres (810 mi)					
27 July	(Soviet Union) R-12 Dvina		(Soviet Union) Kapustin Yar		(Soviet Union) MVS	
27 July		MVS	Suborbital	Missile test	27 July	Successful
27 July	Apogee: 402 kilometres (250 mi)					
27 July	(Soviet Union) R-16U		(Soviet Union) Baikonur Site 41/15		(Soviet Union) RVSN	
27 July		RVSN	Suborbital	Missile test	27 July	Successful
27 July	Apogee: 1,210 kilometres (750 mi)					
29 July; 23:28	(United States) Nike-Cajun		(Sweden) Kronogard		(Sweden) RTG	
29 July; 23:28		NASA	Suborbital	Aeronomy	29 July	Successful
29 July; 23:28	Apogee: 128 kilometres (80 mi)					
30 July; 16:16:08	(United States) XRM-91 Blue Scout Junior		(United States) Cape Canaveral LC-18A		(United States) US Air Force	
30 July; 16:16:08		AFCRL	Suborbital	Plasma research Astronomy	30 July	Successful
30 July; 16:16:08	Apogee: 11,100 kilometres (6,900 mi)					
30 July; 18:36:49	(United States) SM-65E Atlas		(United States) Vandenberg LC-576C		(United States) Strategic Air Command	
30 July; 18:36:49		Strategic Air Command	Suborbital	Missile test	30 July	Successful
30 July; 18:36:49	Apogee: 1,600 kilometres (990 mi)					
31 July; 20:52	(United States) SM-65D Atlas		(United States) Vandenberg LC-576B-1		(United States) Strategic Air Command	
31 July; 20:52		Strategic Air Command	Suborbital	Missile test	31 July	Successful
31 July; 20:52	Apogee: 1,000 kilometres (620 mi)					
July	(United States) Nike-Apache		(United States) White Sands		(United States) US Army	
July		US Army	Suborbital		July	Successful
July	Apogee: 100 kilometres (62 mi)					
July	(United States) Nike-Apache		(United States) White Sands		(United States) US Army	
July		US Army	Suborbital		July	Successful
July	Apogee: 100 kilometres (62 mi)					
=== August ===
1 August; 08:06	(United States) Aerobee-150 (Hi)		(United States) White Sands		(United States) NRL	
1 August; 08:06		NRL	Suborbital	Aeronomy	1 August	Successful
1 August; 08:06	Apogee: 232 kilometres (144 mi)					
1 August; 23:27	(United States) Nike-Cajun		(Sweden) Kronogard		(Sweden) RTG	
1 August; 23:27		NASA	Suborbital	Aeronomy	1 August	Successful
1 August; 23:27	Apogee: 126 kilometres (78 mi)					
2 August; 02:30	(United Kingdom) Skylark-5C		(Australia) Woomera LA-2		(United Kingdom) RAE	
2 August; 02:30		RAE	Suborbital	Test flight	2 August	Launch failure
2 August; 08:00	(United States) Sparoair I		(United States) F3H Demon, Point Mugu		(United States) US Navy	
2 August; 08:00		US Navy	Suborbital	UV Astronomy	2 August	Successful
2 August; 08:00	Apogee: 107 kilometres (66 mi)					
2 August; 21:43	(United States) Shotput		(United States) Wallops Island		(United States) NASA	
2 August; 21:43	(Italy) San Marco Test 2	CRA	Suborbital	Test flight	2 August	Successful
2 August; 21:43	Apogee: 294 kilometres (183 mi)					
2 August; 23:33	(United States) Nike-Cajun		(United States) Wallops Island		(United States) NASA	
2 August; 23:33		Michigan	Suborbital	Aeronomy	2 August	Successful
2 August; 23:33	Apogee: 151 kilometres (94 mi)					
5 August; 17:30:15	(United States) LGM-30B Minuteman IB		(United States) Cape Canaveral LC-32B		(United States) US Air Force	
5 August; 17:30:15		US Air Force	Suborbital	Missile test	5 August	Launch failure
5 August; 17:30:15	Apogee: 100 kilometres (62 mi)					
7 August; 22:29	(United States) Nike-Cajun		(Sweden) Kronogard		(Sweden) RTG	
7 August; 22:29		NASA	Suborbital	Aeronomy	7 August	Successful
7 August; 22:29	Apogee: 130 kilometres (81 mi)					
8 August	(United States) LGM-30A Minuteman IA		(United States) Vandenberg LC-394A-1		(United States) Strategic Air Command	
8 August		Strategic Air Command	Suborbital	Missile test	8 August	Successful
8 August	Apogee: 1,300 kilometres (810 mi)					
8 August	(United States) Nike-Zeus 3		(United States) White Sands LC-38		(United States) US Army	
8 August		US Army	Suborbital	Missile test	8 August	Successful
8 August	Apogee: 200 kilometres (120 mi)					
9 August; 17:14:03	(United States) UGM-27 Polaris A2		(United States) USS Alexander Hamilton, ETR		(United States) US Navy	
9 August; 17:14:03		US Navy	Suborbital	Missile test	9 August	Successful
9 August; 17:14:03	Apogee: 1,000 kilometres (620 mi)					
9 August; 18:19:43	(United States) UGM-27 Polaris A2		(United States) USS Alexander Hamilton, ETR		(United States) US Navy	
9 August; 18:19:43		US Navy	Suborbital	Missile test	9 August	Successful
9 August; 18:19:43	Apogee: 1,000 kilometres (620 mi)					
9 August	(Soviet Union) R-12 Dvina		(Soviet Union) Sovetskaya Gavan		(Soviet Union) MVS	
9 August		MVS	Suborbital	Missile test	9 August	Successful
9 August	Apogee: 402 kilometres (250 mi)					
13 August; 04:59:47	(Soviet Union) R-16U		(Soviet Union) Baikonur Site 41/15		(Soviet Union) RVSN	
13 August; 04:59:47		RVSN	Suborbital	Missile test	13 August	Successful
13 August; 04:59:47	Apogee: 757 kilometres (470 mi)					
14 August; 03:56:05	(United States) UGM-27 Polaris A3		(United States) Cape Canaveral LC-25A		(United States) US Navy	
14 August; 03:56:05		US Navy	Suborbital	Missile test	14 August	Successful
14 August; 03:56:05	Apogee: 1,000 kilometres (620 mi)					
15 August	(United States) Nike-Zeus 3		(United States) White Sands LC-38		(United States) US Army	
15 August		US Army	Suborbital	Missile test	15 August	Successful
15 August	Apogee: 200 kilometres (120 mi)					
15 August	(United States) HGM-25A Titan I		(United States) Vandenberg LC-395A-1		(United States) Strategic Air Command	
15 August		Strategic Air Command	Suborbital	Missile test	15 August	Successful
15 August	Apogee: 1,000 kilometres (620 mi)					
17 August	(United States) UGM-27 Polaris A2		(United States) USS John Marshall, ETR		(United States) US Navy	
17 August		US Navy	Suborbital	Missile test	17 August	Successful
17 August	Apogee: 1,000 kilometres (620 mi)					
17 August	(United States) UGM-27 Polaris A2		(United States) USS John Marshall, ETR		(United States) US Navy	
17 August		US Navy	Suborbital	Missile test	17 August	Successful
17 August	Apogee: 1,000 kilometres (620 mi)					
17 August	(United States) UGM-27 Polaris A2		(United States) USS John Marshall, ETR		(United States) US Navy	
17 August		US Navy	Suborbital	Missile test	17 August	Successful
17 August	Apogee: 1,000 kilometres (620 mi)					
17 August	(United States) UGM-27 Polaris A2		(United States) USS John Marshall, ETR		(United States) US Navy	
17 August		US Navy	Suborbital	Missile test	17 August	Successful
17 August	Apogee: 1,000 kilometres (620 mi)					
17 August	(United States) UGM-27 Polaris A2		(United States) USS John Marshall, ETR		(United States) US Navy	
17 August		US Navy	Suborbital	Missile test	17 August	Successful
17 August	Apogee: 1,000 kilometres (620 mi)					
17 August	(United States) UGM-27 Polaris A2		(United States) USS John Marshall, ETR		(United States) US Navy	
17 August		US Navy	Suborbital	Missile test	17 August	Successful
17 August	Apogee: 1,000 kilometres (620 mi)					
20 August; 04:00:03	(United States) UGM-27 Polaris A3		(United States) Cape Canaveral LC-29A		(United States) US Navy	
20 August; 04:00:03		US Navy	Suborbital	Missile test	20 August	Successful
20 August; 04:00:03	Apogee: 1,000 kilometres (620 mi)					
20 August	(United States) MGM-31 Pershing I		(United States) Hueco		(United States) US Army	
20 August		US Army	Suborbital	Missile test	20 August	Successful
20 August	Apogee: 250 kilometres (160 mi)					
20 August	(Soviet Union) R-16U		(Soviet Union) Baikonur Site 60/8		(Soviet Union) RVSN	
20 August		RVSN	Suborbital	Missile test	20 August	Successful
20 August	Apogee: 1,210 kilometres (750 mi)					
21 August; 21:23:55	(United States) LGM-25C Titan II		(United States) Cape Canaveral LC-15		(United States) US Air Force	
21 August; 21:23:55		AFCRL	Suborbital	Test flight	21 August	Successful
21 August; 21:23:55	Apogee: 1,300 kilometres (810 mi)					
22 August; 18:05:57	(United States) X-15		(United States) NB-52, Edwards		(United States) US Air Force/NASA	
22 August; 18:05:57	(United States) Flight 91	US Air Force/NASA	Suborbital	Technology	18:17:05	Successful
22 August; 18:05:57	Manned flight with astronaut Joseph Walker, apogee: 107 kilometres (66 mi), second and last X-15 flight to reach space, first person to make two spaceflights, first spacecraft to make two spaceflights					
22 August	(United States) Hopi-Dart		(United States) Wallops Island		(United States) NASA	
22 August		NASA	Suborbital	Test flight	22 August	Launch failure
22 August	Apogee: 1 kilometre (0.62 mi)					
23 August; 17:01:06	(United States) UGM-27 Polaris A2		(United States) USS Alexander Hamilton, ETR		(United States) US Navy	
23 August; 17:01:06		US Navy	Suborbital	Missile test	23 August	Successful
23 August; 17:01:06	Apogee: 1,000 kilometres (620 mi)					
23 August; 17:41:04	(United States) UGM-27 Polaris A2		(United States) USS Alexander Hamilton, ETR		(United States) US Navy	
23 August; 17:41:04		US Navy	Suborbital	Missile test	23 August	Successful
23 August; 17:41:04	Apogee: 1,000 kilometres (620 mi)					
23 August	(Soviet Union) R-12 Dvina		(Soviet Union) Sovetskaya Gavan		(Soviet Union) MVS	
23 August		MVS	Suborbital	Missile test	23 August	Successful
23 August	Apogee: 402 kilometres (250 mi)					
24 August; 02:00	(Japan) Lambda 2		(Japan) Kagoshima LA-L		(Japan) ISAS	
24 August; 02:00		ISAS	Suborbital	Ionospheric	24 August	Launch failure
24 August; 02:00	Apogee: 51 kilometres (32 mi)					
24 August; 09:50:57	(United States) SM-65E Atlas		(United States) Vandenberg LC-576F		(United States) Strategic Air Command	
24 August; 09:50:57		Strategic Air Command	Suborbital	Missile test	24 August	Successful
24 August; 09:50:57	Apogee: 1,600 kilometres (990 mi)					
24 August	(United States) Nike-Zeus 3		(United States) Kwajalein		(United States) US Army	
24 August		US Army	Suborbital	Missile test	24 August	Successful
24 August	Apogee: 200 kilometres (120 mi)					
27 August; 17:02:23	(United States) LGM-30B Minuteman IB		(United States) Cape Canaveral LC-31B		(United States) US Air Force	
27 August; 17:02:23		US Air Force	Suborbital	Missile test	27 August	Successful
27 August; 17:02:23	Apogee: 1,300 kilometres (810 mi)					
27 August	(United States) MGM-31 Pershing I		(United States) Hueco		(United States) US Army	
27 August		US Army	Suborbital	Missile test	27 August	Successful
27 August	Apogee: 250 kilometres (160 mi)					
28 August; 23:10	(United States) SM-65D Atlas		(United States) Vandenberg LC-576B-3		(United States) Strategic Air Command	
28 August; 23:10		Strategic Air Command	Suborbital	Missile test	28 August	Successful
28 August; 23:10	Apogee: 1,800 kilometres (1,100 mi)					
29 August	(United States) LGM-30B Minuteman IB		(United States) Vandenberg LC-394A-6		(United States) US Air Force	
29 August		US Air Force	Suborbital	Missile test	29 August	Successful
29 August	Apogee: 1,300 kilometres (810 mi)					
30 August; 06:30:26	(Soviet Union) R-16U		(Soviet Union) Baikonur Site 41/3		(Soviet Union) RVSN	
30 August; 06:30:26		RVSN	Suborbital	Missile test	30 August	Successful
30 August; 06:30:26	Apogee: 754 kilometres (469 mi)					
30 August	(Soviet Union) R-12 Dvina		(Soviet Union) Kapustin Yar		(Soviet Union) MVS	
30 August		MVS	Suborbital	Missile test	30 August	Successful
30 August	Apogee: 402 kilometres (250 mi)					
30 August	(Soviet Union) R-14 Chusovaya		(Soviet Union) Plesetsk		(Soviet Union) RVSN	
30 August		RVSN	Suborbital	Missile test	30 August	Successful
30 August	Apogee: 675 kilometres (419 mi)					
30 August	(United States) HGM-25A Titan I		(United States) Vandenberg LC-395A-3		(United States) Strategic Air Command	
30 August		Strategic Air Command	Suborbital	Missile test	30 August	Successful
30 August	Apogee: 1,000 kilometres (620 mi)					
31 August; 01:35:04	(United States) UGM-27 Polaris A3		(United States) Cape Canaveral LC-25A		(United States) US Navy	
31 August; 01:35:04		US Navy	Suborbital	Missile test	31 August	Successful
31 August; 01:35:04	Apogee: 1,000 kilometres (620 mi)					
31 August	(Soviet Union) R-12 Dvina		(Soviet Union) Kapustin Yar		(Soviet Union) MVS	
31 August		MVS	Suborbital	Missile test	31 August	Successful
31 August	Apogee: 402 kilometres (250 mi)					
August	(United States) Nike-Apache		(United States) White Sands		(United States) US Army	
August		US Army	Suborbital	Target	August	Successful
August	Apogee: 100 kilometres (62 mi)					
August	(United States) Nike-Apache		(United States) White Sands		(United States) US Army	
August		US Army	Suborbital	Target	August	Successful
August	Apogee: 100 kilometres (62 mi)					
=== September ===
1 September; 08:03	(United States) Nike-Cajun		(Norway) Andøya		(Norway) NDRE	
1 September; 08:03		ILC/NDRE	Suborbital	Aeronomy; Ionospheric; Solar	1 September	Successful
1 September; 08:03	Apogee: 100 kilometres (62 mi)					
3 September; 22:36	(United States) Aerobee-150 (Hi)		(United States) White Sands LC-35		(United States) US Air Force	
3 September; 22:36		AFCRL	Suborbital	Aeronomy	3 September	Successful
3 September; 22:36	Apogee: 288 kilometres (179 mi)					
4 September; 13:11	(United States) Aerobee-150 (Hi)		(Canada) Churchill		(United States) NASA	
4 September; 13:11		NASA	Suborbital	Cosmic ray research	4 September	Successful
4 September; 13:11	Apogee: 228 kilometres (142 mi)					
4 September	(United States) UGM-27 Polaris A1		(United States) USS Abraham Lincoln, ETR		(United States) US Navy	
4 September		US Navy	Suborbital	Missile test	4 September	Successful
4 September	Apogee: 500 kilometres (310 mi)					
4 September	(United States) UGM-27 Polaris A1		(United States) USS Abraham Lincoln, ETR		(United States) US Navy	
4 September		US Navy	Suborbital	Missile test	4 September	Successful
4 September	Apogee: 500 kilometres (310 mi)					
4 September	(United States) UGM-27 Polaris A1		(United States) USS Abraham Lincoln, ETR		(United States) US Navy	
4 September		US Navy	Suborbital	Missile test	4 September	Successful
4 September	Apogee: 500 kilometres (310 mi)					
4 September	(United States) UGM-27 Polaris A1		(United States) USS Abraham Lincoln, ETR		(United States) US Navy	
4 September		US Navy	Suborbital	Missile test	4 September	Successful
4 September	Apogee: 500 kilometres (310 mi)					
4 September	(United States) UGM-27 Polaris A1		(United States) USS Abraham Lincoln, ETR		(United States) US Navy	
4 September		US Navy	Suborbital	Missile test	4 September	Successful
4 September	Apogee: 500 kilometres (310 mi)					
4 September	(United States) UGM-27 Polaris A1		(United States) USS Abraham Lincoln, ETR		(United States) US Navy	
4 September		US Navy	Suborbital	Missile test	4 September	Successful
4 September	Apogee: 500 kilometres (310 mi)					
4 September	(Soviet Union) R-16U		(Soviet Union) Baikonur Site 41/3		(Soviet Union) RVSN	
4 September		RVSN	Suborbital	Missile test	4 September	Successful
4 September	Apogee: 1,210 kilometres (750 mi)					
5 September; 03:41	(United Kingdom) Skylark-5C		(Australia) Woomera LA-2		(United Kingdom) RAE	
5 September; 03:41		RAE	Suborbital	Test flight	5 September	Successful
5 September; 03:41	Apogee: 214 kilometres (133 mi)					
5 September	(Canada) Martlet 3		Barbados		(Canada) (United States) DND/DoD	
5 September		DND/DoD	Suborbital	Test flight	5 September	Successful
5 September	Apogee: 100 kilometres (62 mi)					
6 September; 21:30	(United States) Aerobee-150 (Hi)		(United States) White Sands LC-35		(United States) NASA	
6 September; 21:30		HCO	Suborbital	Solar	6 September	Successful
6 September; 21:30	Apogee: 222 kilometres (138 mi)					
6 September; 21:59	(United States) SM-65D Atlas		(United States) Vandenberg LC-576B-2		(United States) Strategic Air Command	
6 September; 21:59		Strategic Air Command	Suborbital	Missile test	6 September	Launch failure
6 September; 21:59	Apogee: 200 kilometres (120 mi)					
6 September	(Soviet Union) R-12 Dvina		(Soviet Union) Kapustin Yar		(Soviet Union) MVS	
6 September		MVS	Suborbital	Missile test	6 September	Successful
6 September	Apogee: 402 kilometres (250 mi)					
9 September; 16:02	(United States) Nike-Apache		(United States) Wallops Island		(United States) NASA	
9 September; 16:02		New Hampshire	Suborbital	Magnetospheric	9 September	Successful
9 September; 16:02	Apogee: 169 kilometres (105 mi)					
9 September			(Soviet Union) Kapustin Yar		(Soviet Union) MVS	
9 September		MVS	Suborbital	Missile test	9 September	Successful
9 September	Apogee: 200 kilometres (120 mi)					
10 September	(Soviet Union) R-16U		(Soviet Union) Baikonur Site 41/3		(Soviet Union) RVSN	
10 September		RVSN	Suborbital	Missile test	10 September	Successful
10 September	Apogee: 1,210 kilometres (750 mi)					
11 September; 14:24	(United States) Aerobee-150A		(United States) Wallops Island		(United States) NASA	
11 September; 14:24		NASA	Suborbital	Technology	11 September	Successful
11 September; 14:24	Apogee: 165 kilometres (103 mi)					
11 September; 21:00	(United States) SM-65D Atlas		(United States) Vandenberg LC-576B-1		(United States) Strategic Air Command	
11 September; 21:00		Strategic Air Command	Suborbital	Missile test	11 September	Launch failure
11 September; 21:00	Apogee: 1,700 kilometres (1,100 mi)					
12 September; 06:20	(United States) Nike-Apache		(Norway) Andøya			
12 September; 06:20		ILC/NDRE	Suborbital	Ionospheric; Plasma; Solar	12 September	Successful
12 September; 06:20	Apogee: 136 kilometres (85 mi)					
12 September	(Soviet Union) R-9 Desna		(Soviet Union) Baikonur		(Soviet Union) RVSN	
12 September		RVSN	Suborbital	Missile test	12 September	Successful
12 September	Apogee: 1,160 kilometres (720 mi)					
17 September	(Soviet Union) R-9 Desna		(Soviet Union) Baikonur		(Soviet Union) RVSN	
17 September		RVSN	Suborbital	Missile test	17 September	Successful
17 September	Apogee: 1,160 kilometres (720 mi)					
17 September	(United States) HGM-25A Titan I		(United States) Vandenberg LC-395A-2		(United States) Strategic Air Command	
17 September		Strategic Air Command	Suborbital	Missile test	17 September	Successful
17 September	Apogee: 1,000 kilometres (620 mi)					
19 September	(Soviet Union) R-12 Dvina		(Soviet Union) Makat		(Soviet Union) MVS	
19 September		MVS	Suborbital	Missile test	19 September	Successful
19 September	Apogee: 402 kilometres (250 mi)					
20 September; 15:45	(United States) Aerobee-150 (Hi)		(United States) White Sands LC-35		(United States) NRL	
20 September; 15:45		NRL	Suborbital	Solar	20 September	Successful
20 September; 15:45	Apogee: 208 kilometres (129 mi)					
20 September	(Soviet Union) R-12 Dvina		(Soviet Union) Plesetsk		(Soviet Union) MVS	
20 September		MVS	Suborbital	Missile test	20 September	Successful
20 September	Apogee: 402 kilometres (250 mi)					
21 September	(Soviet Union) R-12 Dvina		(Soviet Union) Plesetsk		(Soviet Union) MVS	
21 September		MVS	Suborbital	Missile test	21 September	Successful
21 September	Apogee: 402 kilometres (250 mi)					
23 September	(United States) LGM-25C Titan II		(United States) Vandenberg LC-395D		(United States) US Air Force	
23 September		US Air Force	Suborbital	Missile test	23 September	Successful
23 September	Apogee: 1,300 kilometres (810 mi)					
24 September; 04:15	(United States) Nike-Apache		(United States) Eglin		(United States) US Air Force	
24 September; 04:15		AFCRL	Suborbital	Aeronomy; Ionospheric	24 September	Successful
24 September; 04:15	Apogee: 158 kilometres (98 mi)					
24 September; 17:06	(United States) MGM-31 Pershing I		(United States) Black Mesa		(United States) US Army	
24 September; 17:06		US Army	Suborbital	Missile test	24 September	Successful
24 September; 17:06	Apogee: 250 kilometres (160 mi)					
25 September; 03:57	(United States) Nike-Cajun		(United States) Wallops Island		(United States) NASA	
25 September; 03:57		NASA	Suborbital	Aeronomy	25 September	Successful
25 September; 03:57	Apogee: 143 kilometres (89 mi)					
25 September; 04:34	(United States) Nike-Cajun		(United States) Wallops Island		(United States) NASA	
25 September; 04:34		NASA	Suborbital	Aeronomy	25 September	Successful
25 September; 04:34	Apogee: 151 kilometres (94 mi)					
25 September; 07:09	(United States) Aerobee-150A		(United States) Wallops Island		(United States) NASA	
25 September; 07:09		NASA	Suborbital	Ionospheric	25 September	Successful
25 September; 07:09	Apogee: 224 kilometres (139 mi)					
25 September; 11:04:41	(United States) SM-65E Atlas		(United States) Vandenberg LC-576C		(United States) Strategic Air Command	
25 September; 11:04:41		Strategic Air Command	Suborbital	Missile test	25 September	Launch failure
25 September; 11:04:41	Apogee: 100 kilometres (62 mi)					
25 September; 13:40	(United States) MGM-31 Pershing I		(United States) Black Mesa		(United States) US Army	
25 September; 13:40		US Army	Suborbital	Missile test	25 September	Successful
25 September; 13:40	Apogee: 250 kilometres (160 mi)					
25 September; 21:40	(United States) MGM-31 Pershing I		(United States) Black Mesa		(United States) US Army	
25 September; 21:40		US Army	Suborbital	Missile test	25 September	Successful
25 September; 21:40	Apogee: 250 kilometres (160 mi)					
26 September; 04:37	(United States) Nike-Apache		(United States) Eglin		(United States) US Air Force	
26 September; 04:37		AFCRL	Suborbital	Aeronomy	26 September	Successful
26 September; 04:37	Apogee: 170 kilometres (110 mi)					
26 September; 05:30	(United States) Nike-Apache		(United States) Eglin		(United States) US Air Force	
26 September; 05:30		AFCRL	Suborbital	Aeronomy	26 September	Successful
26 September; 05:30	Apogee: 170 kilometres (110 mi)					
26 September	(United States) LGM-30B Minuteman IB		(United States) Vandenberg LC-394A-7		(United States) US Air Force	
26 September		US Air Force	Suborbital	Missile test	26 September	Successful
26 September	Apogee: 1,300 kilometres (810 mi)					
26 September	(Soviet Union) R-16U		(Soviet Union) Baikonur Site 41/3		(Soviet Union) RVSN	
26 September		RVSN	Suborbital	Missile test	26 September	Successful
26 September	Apogee: 1,210 kilometres (750 mi)					
27 September; 03:25:00	(United States) UGM-27 Polaris A3		(United States) USNS Observation Island, ETR		(United States) US Navy	
27 September; 03:25:00		US Navy	Suborbital	Missile test	27 September	Successful
27 September; 03:25:00	Apogee: 1,000 kilometres (620 mi)					
27 September; 13:40	(United States) MGM-31 Pershing I		(United States) Black Mesa		(United States) US Army	
27 September; 13:40		US Army	Suborbital	Missile test	27 September	Successful
27 September; 13:40	Apogee: 250 kilometres (160 mi)					
27 September; 20:40	(United States) MGM-31 Pershing I		(United States) Black Mesa		(United States) US Army	
27 September; 20:40		US Army	Suborbital	Missile test	27 September	Successful
27 September; 20:40	Apogee: 250 kilometres (160 mi)					
28 September; 14:43	(United States) Aerobee-150A		(United States) Wallops Island		(United States) NASA	
28 September; 14:43		NASA	Suborbital	Ionospheric	28 September	Successful
28 September; 14:43	Apogee: 226 kilometres (140 mi)					
28 September	(Soviet Union) R-36		(Soviet Union) Baikonur Site 67/21		(Soviet Union) RVSN	
28 September		RVSN	Suborbital	Missile test	28 September	Launch failure
29 September; 02:37	(United States) Javelin		(United States) Wallops Island		(United States) NASA	
29 September; 02:37		NASA	Suborbital	Ionospheric	29 September	Successful
29 September; 02:37	Apogee: 1,037 kilometres (644 mi)					
September	(Soviet Union) A-350Zh		(Soviet Union) Sary Shagan LC-6		(Soviet Union) PRO	
September		PRO	Suborbital	Missile test	September	Successful
September	Apogee: 100 kilometres (62 mi)					
September	(United States) Nike-Apache		(United States) White Sands		(United States) US Army	
September		US Army	Suborbital	Target	September	Successful
September	Apogee: 100 kilometres (62 mi)					
September	(United States) Nike-Apache		(United States) White Sands		(United States) US Army	
September		US Army	Suborbital	Target	September	Successful
September	Apogee: 100 kilometres (62 mi)					
