= 1963 in spaceflight (January–March) =

This is a list of spaceflights launched between January and June 1963. For an overview of the whole year, see 1963 in spaceflight.

== Orbital launches ==
- ← Jan
- Feb
- Mar
- Apr
- May
- Jun
- Jul
- Aug
- Sep
- Oct
- Nov
- Dec →

Date and time (UTC)	Rocket	Flight number	Launch site		LSP	
Date and time (UTC)	Payload (⚀ = CubeSat)	Operator	Orbit	Function	Decay (UTC)	Outcome
Date and time (UTC)	Remarks					
=== January ===
4 January; 08:48	(Soviet Union) Molniya-L		(Soviet Union) Baikonur Site 1/5		(Soviet Union)	
4 January; 08:48	(Soviet Union) Luna E-6 №2 (Sputnik 25)		Intended: Highly elliptical Achieved: Low Earth	Lunar lander	11 January	Launch failure
4 January; 08:48	Maiden flight of Molynia-L, upper stage ullage motor failed to ignite, leaving spacecraft in useless orbit.					
7 January; 21:09:49	(United States) Thor DM-21 Agena-D		(United States) Vandenberg LC-75-1-1		(United States) US Air Force	
7 January; 21:09:49	(United States) OPS 0048 (KH-4 18/9051)	US Air Force/NRO	Low Earth	Optical imaging	24 January	Partial spacecraft failure
7 January; 21:09:49	(United States) SRV	US Air Force/NRO	Low Earth	Film return	January	Successful
7 January; 21:09:49	Attitude control problems with spacecraft.					
16 January; 21:59	(United States) Thor DM-21 Agena-B		(United States) Vandenberg LC-75-3-5		(United States) US Air Force	
16 January; 21:59	(United States) OPS 0180 (Ferret/Samos-F2 3)	US Air Force/NRO	Low Earth	ELINT	9 January 1969	Successful
16 January; 21:59	Final flight of carrier rocket as Thor DM-21 Agena-B before being redesignated SLV-2.					
← Jan; Feb; Mar; Apr; May; Jun; Jul; Aug; Sep; Oct; Nov; Dec →; === February ===
3 February; 09:29:14	(Soviet Union) Molniya-L		(Soviet Union) Baikonur Site 1/5		(Soviet Union)	
3 February; 09:29:14	(Soviet Union) Luna E-6 №3 (Luna 1963B)		Intended: Highly elliptical	Lunar lander	3 February	Launch failure
3 February; 09:29:14	Upper stage gyroscope malfunction, failed to orbit.					
14 February; 05:35:08	(United States) Delta B		(United States) Cape Canaveral LC-17B		(United States) US Air Force	
14 February; 05:35:08	(United States) Syncom 1	NASA	Intended: Geosynchronous; Achieved: Subsynchronous	Communications	In orbit	Spacecraft failure
14 February; 05:35:08	Contact with spacecraft lost following apogee motor firing.					
19 February; 16:33	(United States) Scout X-3M		(United States) Point Arguello LC-D		(United States) US Air Force	
19 February; 16:33	(United States) OPS 0240 (DSAP-1 F3/P-35 3/AF-3)	US Air Force	Low Earth	Weather	26 December 1979	Successful
19 February; 16:33	Only flight of Scout X-3M.					
28 February; 21:48	(United States) Thrust Augmented Thor SLV-2A Agena-D		(United States) Vandenberg LC-75-3-5		(United States) US Air Force	
28 February; 21:48	(United States) OPS 0583 (KH-4 19/9052)	US Air Force/NRO	Low Earth	Optical imaging	28 February	Launch failure
28 February; 21:48	(United States) SRV 610	US Air Force/NRO	Low Earth	Film return	28 February	Launch failure
28 February; 21:48	Maiden flight of Thrust Augmented Thor-Agena, failed to orbit.					
← Jan; Feb; Mar; Apr; May; Jun; Jul; Aug; Sep; Oct; Nov; Dec →; === March ===
18 March; 21:13	(United States) Thrust Augmented Thor SLV-2A Agena-D		(United States) Vandenberg LC-75-3-4		(United States) US Air Force	
18 March; 21:13	(United States) OPS 0627 (KH-6 1/8001)	US Air Force/NRO	Low Earth	Optical imaging	18 March	Launch failure
18 March; 21:13	(United States) SRV 612	US Air Force/NRO	Low Earth	Film return	18 March	Launch failure
18 March; 21:13	(United States) P-11 4051 (Hitchhiker 1)	US Air Force	Low Earth	ELINT	18 March	Launch failure
18 March; 21:13	First KH-6 launch, failed to orbit.					
21 March; 08:30	(Soviet Union) Vostok-2		(Soviet Union) Baikonur Site 1/5		(Soviet Union)	
21 March; 08:30	(Soviet Union) Kosmos 13 (Zenit-2 №9)	OKB-1	Low Earth	Optical imaging	29 March	Successful
← Jan; Feb; Mar; Apr; May; Jun; Jul; Aug; Sep; Oct; Nov; Dec →
For flights after 31 March, see 1963 in spaceflight (April-June)

== Suborbital launches ==
- ← Jan
- Feb
- Mar
- Apr
- May
- Jun
- Jul
- Aug
- Sep
- Oct
- Nov
- Dec →

Date and time (UTC)	Rocket	Flight number	Launch site		LSP	
Date and time (UTC)	Payload (⚀ = CubeSat)	Operator	Orbit	Function	Decay (UTC)	Outcome
Date and time (UTC)	Remarks					
=== January ===
7 January; 22:30:10	(United States) LGM-30B Minuteman IB		(United States) Cape Canaveral LC-31B		(United States) US Air Force	
7 January; 22:30:10		US Air Force	Suborbital	Missile test	7 January	Launch failure
7 January; 22:30:10	Apogee: 100 kilometres (62 mi)					
10 January; 05:31:02	(United States) LGM-25C Titan II		(United States) Cape Canaveral LC-16		(United States) US Air Force	
10 January; 05:31:02		US Air Force	Suborbital	Missile test	10 January	Launch failure
10 January; 05:31:02	Apogee: 500 kilometres (310 mi)					
16 January			(Soviet Union) Plesetsk		(Soviet Union) MVS	
16 January		MVS	Suborbital	Missile test	16 January	Successful
16 January	Apogee: 200 kilometres (120 mi)					
16 January			(Soviet Union) Plesetsk		(Soviet Union) MVS	
16 January		MVS	Suborbital	Missile test	16 January	Successful
16 January	Apogee: 200 kilometres (120 mi)					
18 January; 03:32:50	(United States) MGM-31 Pershing I		(United States) Cape Canaveral LC-30A		(United States) US Army	
18 January; 03:32:50		US Army	Suborbital	Missile test	18 January	Successful
18 January; 03:32:50	Apogee: 250 kilometres (160 mi)					
22 January	(Soviet Union) R-12 Dvina		(Soviet Union) Makat		(Soviet Union) MVS	
22 January		MVS	Suborbital	Missile test	22 January	Successful
22 January	Apogee: 402 kilometres (250 mi)					
23 January; 00:27:37	(United States) PGM-19 Jupiter		(United States) Cape Canaveral LC-26A		(United States) US Army	
23 January; 00:27:37		US Army	Suborbital	Missile test	23 January	Successful
23 January; 00:27:37	Apogee: 500 kilometres (310 mi)					
23 January; 18:10:13	(United States) LGM-30B Minuteman IB		(United States) Cape Canaveral LC-32B		(United States) US Air Force	
23 January; 18:10:13		US Air Force	Suborbital	Missile test	23 January	Successful
23 January; 18:10:13	Apogee: 1,300 kilometres (810 mi)					
25 January; 10:44:07	(United States) SM-65D Atlas		(United States) Vandenberg LC-576B-2		(United States) Strategic Air Command	
25 January; 10:44:07		Strategic Air Command	Suborbital	ABM test	25 January	Launch failure
25 January; 10:44:07	Apogee: 100 kilometres (62 mi)					
25 January			(Soviet Union) Plesetsk		(Soviet Union) MVS	
25 January		MVS	Suborbital	Missile test	25 January	Successful
25 January	Apogee: 200 kilometres (120 mi)					
25 January			(Soviet Union) Plesetsk		(Soviet Union) MVS	
25 January		MVS	Suborbital	Missile test	25 January	Successful
25 January	Apogee: 200 kilometres (120 mi)					
27 January; 01:00	(Soviet Union) R-11A-1		(Soviet Union) Kapustin Yar		(Soviet Union) RVSN	
27 January; 01:00		FIAN	Suborbital	Ionosphere research	27 January	Successful
27 January; 01:00	Apogee: 100 kilometres (62 mi)					
29 January; 16:27	(United States) Aerobee-150A		(United States) Wallops Island		(United States) NASA	
29 January; 16:27		Johns Hopkins	Suborbital	Aeronomy	29 January	Launch failure
29 January; 16:27	Apogee: 4 kilometres (2.5 mi)					
29 January	(United States) HGM-25A Titan I		(United States) Vandenberg LC-395A-1			
29 January			Suborbital	Missile test	29 January	Successful
29 January	Apogee: 1,000 kilometres (620 mi)					
31 January; 00:30:05	(United States) MGM-31 Pershing I		(United States) Cape Canaveral LC-30A		(United States) US Army	
31 January; 00:30:05		US Army	Suborbital	Missile test	31 January	Successful
31 January; 00:30:05	Apogee: 250 kilometres (160 mi)					
31 January; 08:51:51	(United States) SM-65D Atlas		(United States) Vandenberg LC-576A-3		(United States) Strategic Air Command	
31 January; 08:51:51		Strategic Air Command	Suborbital	ABM test	31 January	Successful
31 January; 08:51:51	Apogee: 1,800 kilometres (1,100 mi)					
January	(United States) Nike-Apache		(United States) White Sands		(United States) US Army	
January		US Army	Suborbital	REV Test	January	Successful
January	Apogee: 100 kilometres (62 mi)					
January	(United States) Nike-Apache		(United States) White Sands		(United States) US Army	
January		US Army	Suborbital	REV Test	January	Successful
January	Apogee: 100 kilometres (62 mi)					
January	(Soviet Union) R-14 Chusovaya		(Soviet Union) Plesetsk		(Soviet Union) RVSN	
January		RVSN	Suborbital	Missile test	January	Successful
January	Apogee: 675 kilometres (419 mi)					
=== February ===
1 February	(Soviet Union) R-12 Dvina		(Soviet Union) Plesetsk		(Soviet Union) MVS	
1 February		MVS	Suborbital	Missile test	1 February	Successful
1 February	Apogee: 402 kilometres (250 mi)					
2 February; 06:56:29	(United States) Blue Scout Junior SLV-1C		(United States) Point Arguello LC-A		(United States) US Air Force	
2 February; 06:56:29		Strategic Air Command	Suborbital	Communications	2 February	Successful
2 February; 06:56:29	Apogee: 1,000 kilometres (620 mi)					
4 February	(United States) UGM-27 Polaris A2		(United States) USS Patrick Henry, ETR		(United States) US Navy	
4 February		US Navy	Suborbital	Missile test	4 February	Successful
4 February	Apogee: 1,000 kilometres (620 mi)					
4 February	(United States) UGM-27 Polaris A2		(United States) USS Patrick Henry, ETR		(United States) US Navy	
4 February		US Navy	Suborbital	Missile test	4 February	Successful
4 February	Apogee: 1,000 kilometres (620 mi)					
5 February	(United States) UGM-27 Polaris A2		(United States) USS Patrick Henry, ETR		(United States) US Navy	
5 February		US Navy	Suborbital	Missile test	5 February	Successful
5 February	Apogee: 1,000 kilometres (620 mi)					
5 February	(United States) UGM-27 Polaris A2		(United States) USS Patrick Henry, ETR		(United States) US Navy	
5 February		US Navy	Suborbital	Missile test	5 February	Successful
5 February	Apogee: 1,000 kilometres (620 mi)					
5 February	(Soviet Union) R-12 Dvina		(Soviet Union) Makat		(Soviet Union) MVS	
5 February		MVS	Suborbital	Missile test	5 February	Successful
5 February	Apogee: 402 kilometres (250 mi)					
6 February; 17:58:24	(United States) LGM-25C Titan II		(United States) Cape Canaveral LC-15		(United States) US Air Force	
6 February; 17:58:24		US Air Force	Suborbital	Missile test	6 February	Successful
6 February; 17:58:24	Apogee: 1,300 kilometres (810 mi)					
7 February; 15:59:59	(United States) UGM-27 Polaris A3		(United States) Cape Canaveral LC-29A		(United States) US Navy	
7 February; 15:59:59		US Navy	Suborbital	Missile test	7 February	Successful
7 February; 15:59:59	Apogee: 1,000 kilometres (620 mi)					
8 February	(Soviet Union) R-12 Dvina		(Soviet Union) Makat		(Soviet Union) MVS	
8 February		MVS	Suborbital	Missile test	8 February	Successful
8 February	Apogee: 402 kilometres (250 mi)					
11 February; 15:30	(United States) UGM-27 Polaris A3		(United States) Cape Canaveral LC-25A		(United States) US Navy	
11 February; 15:30		US Navy	Suborbital	Missile test	11 February	Successful
11 February; 15:30	Apogee: 1,000 kilometres (620 mi)					
11 February	(Soviet Union) R-9A Desna		(Soviet Union) Baikonur Site 70		(Soviet Union) RVSN	
11 February		RVSN	Suborbital	Missile test	11 February	Successful
11 February	Apogee: 1,160 kilometres (720 mi)					
12 February; 01:47	(United States) Journeyman		(United States) Point Arguello LC-A		(United States) NASA	
12 February; 01:47		Minnesota	Suborbital	Magnetospheric	12 February	Successful
12 February; 01:47	Apogee: 1,675 kilometres (1,041 mi)					
13 February; 11:55:05	(United States) SM-65D Atlas		(United States) Vandenberg LC-576A-1		(United States) Strategic Air Command	
13 February; 11:55:05		NRL	Suborbital	ABM test	13 February	Successful
13 February; 11:55:05	Apogee: 1,800 kilometres (1,100 mi)					
13 February; 12:30	(United States) Nike-Zeus 3		(United States) Kwajalein		(United States) US Army	
13 February; 12:30		US Army	Suborbital	Missile test	13 February	Successful
13 February; 12:30	Apogee: 200 kilometres (120 mi)					
13 February	(Soviet Union) R-12 Dvina		(Soviet Union) Plesetsk		(Soviet Union) MVS	
13 February		MVS	Suborbital	Missile test	13 February	Successful
13 February	Apogee: 402 kilometres (250 mi)					
13 February	(Soviet Union) R-14 Chusovaya		(Soviet Union) Plesetsk		(Soviet Union) RVSN	
13 February		RVSN	Suborbital	Missile test	13 February	Successful
13 February	Apogee: 675 kilometres (419 mi)					
14 February; 00:30	(United States) Aerobee-150 (Hi)		(United States) Eglin		(United States) US Air Force	
14 February; 00:30		US Air Force	Suborbital	Aeronomy	14 February	Successful
14 February; 00:30	Apogee: 234 kilometres (145 mi)					
14 February	(Soviet Union) R-9 Desna		(Soviet Union) Baikonur		(Soviet Union) RVSN	
14 February		RVSN	Suborbital	Missile test	14 February	Launch failure
14 February	(Soviet Union) R-12 Dvina		(Soviet Union) Makat		(Soviet Union) MVS	
14 February		MVS	Suborbital	Missile test	14 February	Successful
14 February	Apogee: 402 kilometres (250 mi)					
14 February	(Soviet Union) R-12 Dvina		(Soviet Union) Plesetsk		(Soviet Union) MVS	
14 February		MVS	Suborbital	Missile test	14 February	Successful
14 February	Apogee: 402 kilometres (250 mi)					
15 February; 00:45:00	(United States) MGM-31 Pershing I		(United States) Cape Canaveral LC-30A		(United States) US Army	
15 February; 00:45:00		US Army	Suborbital	Missile test	15 February	Successful
15 February; 00:45:00	Apogee: 250 kilometres (160 mi)					
15 February; 16:34	(United States) Aerobee-150 (Hi)		(United States) White Sands LC-35		(United States) NRL	
15 February; 16:34		NRL	Suborbital	Aeronomy	15 February	Successful
15 February; 16:34	Apogee: 239 kilometres (149 mi)					
16 February; 00:30	(United States) Nike-Zeus 3		(United States) White Sands LC-38		(United States) US Army	
16 February; 00:30		US Army	Suborbital	ASAT test	16 February	Successful
16 February; 00:30	Apogee: 240 kilometres (150 mi)					
16 February; 21:45	(United States) LGM-25C Titan II		(United States) Vandenberg LC-395C		(United States) US Air Force	
16 February; 21:45		US Air Force	Suborbital	Missile test	16 February	Launch failure
16 February; 21:45	Apogee: 5 kilometres (3.1 mi)					
16 February	(United States) Trailblazer 1		(United States) Wallops Island		(United States) NASA	
16 February		NASA	Suborbital	REV Test	16 February	Successful
16 February	Apogee: 280 kilometres (170 mi)					
18 February; 14:00:02	(United States) UGM-27 Polaris A3		(United States) Cape Canaveral LC-29A		(United States) US Navy	
18 February; 14:00:02		US Navy	Suborbital	Missile test	18 February	Launch failure
18 February; 14:00:02	Apogee: 1 kilometre (0.62 mi)					
18 February; 17:43	(United States) Aerobee-150 (Hi)		(United States) White Sands LC-35		(United States) NRL	
18 February; 17:43		NRL	Suborbital	Solar	18 February	Successful
18 February; 17:43	Apogee: 306 kilometres (190 mi)					
18 February; 23:14	(United States) Nike-Asp		(United States) Wallops Island		(United States) NASA	
18 February; 23:14		GCA	Suborbital	Aeronomy	18 February	Launch failure
18 February; 23:14	Apogee: 25 kilometres (16 mi)					
19 February			(Soviet Union) Plesetsk		(Soviet Union) MVS	
19 February		MVS	Suborbital	Missile test	19 February	Successful
19 February	Apogee: 200 kilometres (120 mi)					
20 February; 23:18	(United States) Nike-Apache		(United States) Wallops Island		(United States) NASA	
20 February; 23:18		GCA	Suborbital	Aeronomy	20 February	Successful
20 February; 23:18	Apogee: 164 kilometres (102 mi)					
20 February; 23:34	(United States) Nike-Cajun		(Canada) Churchill		(United States) NASA	
20 February; 23:34		NASA	Suborbital	Aeronomy	20 February	Successful
20 February; 23:34	Apogee: 113 kilometres (70 mi)					
20 February; 23:47	(United States) Nike-Cajun		(United States) Wallops Island		(United States) NASA	
20 February; 23:47		NASA	Suborbital	Aeronomy	20 February	Successful
20 February; 23:47	Apogee: 113 kilometres (70 mi)					
20 February	(United States) Nike-Zeus 3		(United States) White Sands LC-38		(United States) US Army	
20 February		US Army	Suborbital	Missile test	20 February	Successful
20 February	Apogee: 200 kilometres (120 mi)					
21 February; 01:00:04	(United States) LGM-30A Minuteman IA		(United States) Cape Canaveral LC-32B		(United States) US Air Force	
21 February; 01:00:04		US Air Force	Suborbital	Missile test	21 February	Successful
21 February; 01:00:04	Apogee: 1,300 kilometres (810 mi)					
21 February; 17:56:07	(United States) UGM-27 Polaris A2		(United States) USS Thomas Jefferson, ETR		(United States) US Navy	
21 February; 17:56:07		US Navy	Suborbital	Missile test	21 February	Successful
21 February; 17:56:07	Apogee: 1,000 kilometres (620 mi)					
21 February; 23:16	(United States) Nike-Apache		(United States) Wallops Island		(United States) NASA	
21 February; 23:16		GCA	Suborbital	Aeronomy	21 February	Successful
21 February; 23:16	Apogee: 172 kilometres (107 mi)					
22 February	(Soviet Union) R-9 Desna		(Soviet Union) Baikonur		(Soviet Union) RVSN	
22 February		RVSN	Suborbital	Missile test	22 February	Successful
22 February	Apogee: 1,160 kilometres (720 mi)					
26 February; 01:31:43	(United States) MGM-31 Pershing I		(United States) Cape Canaveral LC-30A		(United States) US Army	
26 February; 01:31:43		US Army	Suborbital	Missile test	26 February	Successful
26 February; 01:31:43	Apogee: 250 kilometres (160 mi)					
26 February	(United States) Aerobee-150 (Hi)		(United States) White Sands LC-35		(United States) US Air Force	
26 February		US Air Force	Suborbital	Aeronomy	26 February	Launch failure
26 February	Apogee: 200 kilometres (120 mi)					
27 February; 19:30:00	(United States) Nike-Apache		(United States) Wallops Island		(United States) NASA	
27 February; 19:30:00		GCA	Suborbital	Ionospheric	27 February	Successful
27 February; 19:30:00	Apogee: 151 kilometres (94 mi)					
28 February; 09:02:48	(United States) SM-65D Atlas		(United States) Vandenberg LC-576A-3		(United States) Strategic Air Command	
28 February; 09:02:48		Strategic Air Command	Suborbital	ABM test	28 February	Successful
28 February; 09:02:48	Apogee: 1,800 kilometres (1,100 mi)					
28 February; 09:30	(United States) Nike-Zeus 3		(United States) Kwajalein		(United States) US Army	
28 February; 09:30		US Army	Suborbital	Missile test	28 February	Successful
28 February; 09:30	Apogee: 200 kilometres (120 mi)					
28 February; 21:48	(United States) Nike-Cajun		(Canada) Churchill		(United States) NASA	
28 February; 21:48		NASA	Suborbital	Aeronomy	28 February	Successful
28 February; 21:48	Apogee: 113 kilometres (70 mi)					
28 February; 22:11	(United States) Nike-Cajun		(United States) Wallops Island		(United States) NASA	
28 February; 22:11		NASA	Suborbital	Aeronomy	28 February	Successful
28 February; 22:11	Apogee: 103 kilometres (64 mi)					
28 February	(United States) Hopi-Dart		(United States) Wallops Island		(United States) NASA	
28 February		NASA	Suborbital	Test flight	28 February	Launch failure
28 February	Apogee: 1 kilometre (0.62 mi)					
February	(United States) Nike-Apache		(United States) White Sands		(United States) US Army	
February		US Army	Suborbital	REV Test	February	Successful
February	Apogee: 100 kilometres (62 mi)					
=== March ===
1 March; 01:20	(United Kingdom) Skylark-7C		(Australia) Woomera LA-2		(United Kingdom) RAE	
1 March; 01:20		UCL; Birmingham; UCW	Suborbital	Ionospheric; Solar	1 March	Successful
1 March; 01:20	Apogee: 209 kilometres (130 mi)					
1 March; 21:00	(United States) SM-65F Atlas		(United States) Cape Canaveral LC-11		(United States) US Air Force	
1 March; 21:00		US Air Force	Suborbital	REV Test	1 March	Successful
1 March; 21:00	Apogee: 1,800 kilometres (1,100 mi)					
1 March	(Soviet Union) R-12 Dvina		(Soviet Union) Makat		(Soviet Union) MVS	
1 March		MVS	Suborbital	Missile test	1 March	Successful
1 March	Apogee: 402 kilometres (250 mi)					
4 March	(Soviet Union) R-16U		(Soviet Union) Baikonur Site 41/4		(Soviet Union) RVSN	
4 March		RVSN	Suborbital	Missile test	4 March	Successful
4 March	Apogee: 1,210 kilometres (750 mi)					
5 March; 01:00:01	(United States) MGM-31 Pershing I		(United States) Cape Canaveral LC-30D		(United States) US Army	
5 March; 01:00:01		US Army	Suborbital	Missile test	5 March	Successful
5 March; 01:00:01	Apogee: 250 kilometres (160 mi)					
6 March; 22:30	(United States) Aerobee-150 (Hi)		(United States) White Sands LC-35		(United States) US Air Force	
6 March; 22:30		US Air Force	Suborbital	Aeronomy	6 March	Successful
6 March; 22:30	Apogee: 228 kilometres (142 mi)					
7 March; 17:48:15	(United States) UGM-27 Polaris A2		(United States) USS Thomas Jefferson, ETR		(United States) US Navy	
7 March; 17:48:15		US Navy	Suborbital	Missile test	7 March	Launch failure
7 March; 17:48:15	Apogee: 1 kilometre (0.62 mi)					
7 March; 18:48:15	(United States) UGM-27 Polaris A2		(United States) USS Thomas Jefferson, ETR		(United States) US Navy	
7 March; 18:48:15		US Navy	Suborbital	Missile test	7 March	Successful
7 March; 18:48:15	Apogee: 1,000 kilometres (620 mi)					
7 March	(Soviet Union) R-12 Dvina		(Soviet Union) Makat		(Soviet Union) MVS	
7 March		MVS	Suborbital	Missile test	7 March	Successful
7 March	Apogee: 402 kilometres (250 mi)					
8 March; 19:30	(United States) Nike-Apache		(United States) Wallops Island		(United States) NASA	
8 March; 19:30		NASA	Suborbital	Ionospheric	8 March	Successful
8 March; 19:30	Apogee: 155 kilometres (96 mi)					
9 March; 00:01	(United States) Nike-Cajun		(Canada) Churchill		(United States) NASA	
9 March; 00:01		NASA	Suborbital	Aeronomy	9 March	Successful
9 March; 00:01	Apogee: 117 kilometres (73 mi)					
9 March; 00:01	(United States) Nike-Cajun		(United States) Wallops Island		(United States) NASA	
9 March; 00:01		NASA	Suborbital	Aeronomy	9 March	Successful
9 March; 00:01	Apogee: 119 kilometres (74 mi)					
10 March; 02:42	(United States) SM-65D Atlas		(United States) Vandenberg LC-576B-3		(United States) Strategic Air Command	
10 March; 02:42		Strategic Air Command	Suborbital	Missile test	10 March	Launch failure
11 March; 04:30	(United Kingdom) Skylark-7C		(Australia) Woomera LA-2		(United Kingdom) RAE	
11 March; 04:30		UCL; Birmingham; UCW	Suborbital	Ionospheric; Solar	11 March	Successful
11 March; 04:30	Apogee: 209 kilometres (130 mi)					
11 March	(Soviet Union) R-9 Desna		(Soviet Union) Baikonur		(Soviet Union) RVSN	
11 March		RVSN	Suborbital	Missile test	11 March	Launch failure
12 March; 05:21	(United States) SM-65D Atlas		(United States) Vandenberg LC-576B-2		(United States) Strategic Air Command	
12 March; 05:21		Strategic Air Command	Suborbital	Missile test	12 March	Successful
12 March; 05:21	Apogee: 1,800 kilometres (1,100 mi)					
12 March; 09:50	(United States) HAD		(Australia) Woomera LA-2		(Australia) WRE	
12 March; 09:50		WRE	Suborbital	Aeronomy	12 March	Successful
12 March; 09:50	Apogee: 124 kilometres (77 mi)					
12 March	(Soviet Union) R-12 Dvina		(Soviet Union) Makat		(Soviet Union) MVS	
12 March		MVS	Suborbital	Missile test	12 March	Successful
12 March	Apogee: 402 kilometres (250 mi)					
14 March; 01:01:49	(United States) Blue Scout Junior SLV-1C		(United States) Point Arguello LC-A		(United States) US Air Force	
14 March; 01:01:49		Strategic Air Command	Suborbital	Communications	14 March	Successful
14 March; 01:01:49	Apogee: 1,000 kilometres (620 mi)					
14 March; 01:46:04	(United States) MGM-31 Pershing I		(United States) Cape Canaveral LC-30A		(United States) US Army	
14 March; 01:46:04		US Army	Suborbital	Missile test	14 March	Successful
14 March; 01:46:04	Apogee: 250 kilometres (160 mi)					
14 March	(United States) UGM-27 Polaris A2		(United States) USS Theodore Roosevelt, ETR		(United States) US Navy	
14 March		US Navy	Suborbital	Missile test	14 March	Successful
14 March	Apogee: 1,000 kilometres (620 mi)					
14 March	(United States) UGM-27 Polaris A2		(United States) USS Theodore Roosevelt, ETR		(United States) US Navy	
14 March		US Navy	Suborbital	Missile test	14 March	Successful
14 March	Apogee: 1,000 kilometres (620 mi)					
14 March	(United States) UGM-27 Polaris A2		(United States) USS Theodore Roosevelt, ETR		(United States) US Navy	
14 March		US Navy	Suborbital	Missile test	14 March	Successful
14 March	Apogee: 1,000 kilometres (620 mi)					
14 March	(Soviet Union) R-9 Desna		(Soviet Union) Baikonur		(Soviet Union) RVSN	
14 March		RVSN	Suborbital	Missile test	14 March	Successful
14 March	Apogee: 1,160 kilometres (720 mi)					
15 March; 11:38	(United States) SM-65D Atlas		(United States) Vandenberg LC-576B-1		(United States) Strategic Air Command	
15 March; 11:38		Strategic Air Command	Suborbital	Missile test	15 March	Launch failure
15 March; 11:38	Apogee: 300 kilometres (190 mi)					
15 March	(Soviet Union) R-12 Dvina		(Soviet Union) Makat		(Soviet Union) MVS	
15 March		MVS	Suborbital	Missile test	15 March	Successful
15 March	Apogee: 402 kilometres (250 mi)					
16 March; 02:05:40	(United States) SM-65F Atlas		(United States) Vandenberg LC-576D		(United States) Strategic Air Command	
16 March; 02:05:40		Strategic Air Command	Suborbital	Missile test	16 March	Successful
16 March; 02:05:40	Apogee: 1,400 kilometres (870 mi)					
16 March; 02:19	(United States) Aerobee-150A		(United States) Wallops Island		(United States) NASA	
16 March; 02:19		NASA	Suborbital	XR astronomy	16 March	Successful
16 March; 02:19	Apogee: 201 kilometres (125 mi)					
16 March; 08:32:22	(United States) SM-65D Atlas		(United States) Vandenberg LC-576A-1		(United States) Strategic Air Command	
16 March; 08:32:22		Strategic Air Command	Suborbital	Target; Aeronomy	16 March	Launch failure
16 March; 08:32:22	Apogee: 300 kilometres (190 mi)					
16 March	(Soviet Union) R-12 Dvina		(Soviet Union) Plesetsk		(Soviet Union) MVS	
16 March		MVS	Suborbital	Missile test	16 March	Successful
16 March	Apogee: 402 kilometres (250 mi)					
18 March	(Soviet Union) RT-1		(Soviet Union) Plesetsk		(Soviet Union) RVSN	
18 March		RVSN	Suborbital	Missile test	18 March	Successful
18 March	Apogee: 500 kilometres (310 mi)					
19 March; 01:29:59	(United States) LGM-30B Minuteman IB		(United States) Cape Canaveral LC-31B		(United States) US Air Force	
19 March; 01:29:59		US Air Force	Suborbital	Missile test	19 March	Successful
19 March; 01:29:59	Apogee: 1,300 kilometres (810 mi)					
19 March; 16:00:02	(United States) UGM-27 Polaris A3		(United States) Cape Canaveral LC-29A		(United States) US Navy	
19 March; 16:00:02		US Navy	Suborbital	Missile test	19 March	Successful
19 March; 16:00:02	Apogee: 1,000 kilometres (620 mi)					
19 March	(Soviet Union) R-12 Dvina		(Soviet Union) Makat		(Soviet Union) MVS	
19 March		MVS	Suborbital	Missile test	19 March	Successful
19 March	Apogee: 402 kilometres (250 mi)					
21 March; 11:40	(Soviet Union) R-12 Dvina		(Soviet Union) Vladimirovka PL-1		(Soviet Union) RVSN	
21 March; 11:40		RVSN	Suborbital	REV Test	21 March	Successful
21 March; 11:40	Apogee: 405 kilometres (252 mi)					
21 March; 15:22:48	(United States) LGM-25C Titan II		(United States) Cape Canaveral LC-15		(United States) US Air Force	
21 March; 15:22:48		US Air Force	Suborbital	Missile test	21 March	Successful
21 March; 15:22:48	Apogee: 1,300 kilometres (810 mi)					
21 March; 21:10:08	(United States) SM-65F Atlas		(United States) Vandenberg OSTF-2		(United States) US Air Force	
21 March; 21:10:08		US Air Force	Suborbital	Missile test	21 March	Successful
21 March; 21:10:08	Apogee: 1,400 kilometres (870 mi)					
21 March	(United States) Nike-Zeus 3		(United States) Kwajalein LC-38		(United States) US Army	
21 March		US Army	Suborbital	ASAT test	21 March	Successful
21 March	Apogee: 207 kilometres (129 mi)					
22 March; 01:15	(United States) MGM-31 Pershing I		(United States) Cape Canaveral LC-30A		(United States) US Army	
22 March; 01:15		US Army	Suborbital	Missile test	22 March	Successful
22 March; 01:15	Apogee: 250 kilometres (160 mi)					
24 March; 00:29:14	(United States) SM-65F Atlas		(United States) Vandenberg LC-576E		(United States) Strategic Air Command	
24 March; 00:29:14		Strategic Air Command	Suborbital	Missile test	24 March	Launch failure
24 March; 00:29:14	Apogee: 10 kilometres (6.2 mi)					
25 March; 03:17	(Canada) Black Brant I		(Canada) Churchill		(Canada) CARDE	
25 March; 03:17		CARDE	Suborbital	Aeronomy	25 March	Successful
25 March; 03:17	Apogee: 100 kilometres (62 mi)					
25 March	(Soviet Union) R-12 Dvina		(Soviet Union) Plesetsk		(Soviet Union) MVS	
25 March		MVS	Suborbital	Missile test	25 March	Successful
25 March	Apogee: 402 kilometres (250 mi)					
27 March	(United States) Hopi-Dart		(United States) Wallops Island		(United States) NASA	
27 March		NASA	Suborbital	Test flight	27 March	Launch failure
27 March	Apogee: 1 kilometre (0.62 mi)					
28 March; 00:15	(United States) Aerobee-150 (Hi)		(United States) White Sands LC-35		(United States) NASA	
28 March; 00:15		NASA	Suborbital	UV Astronomy	28 March	Successful
28 March; 00:15	Apogee: 300 kilometres (190 mi)					
28 March; 01:30:00	(United States) LGM-30B Minuteman IB		(United States) Cape Canaveral LC-32B		(United States) US Air Force	
28 March; 01:30:00		US Air Force	Suborbital	Missile test	28 March	Successful
28 March; 01:30:00	Apogee: 1,300 kilometres (810 mi)					
28 March; 07:54:59	(United States) Nike-Apache		(United States) Wallops Island		(United States) NASA	
28 March; 07:54:59		Michigan	Suborbital	Aeronomy	28 March	Successful
28 March; 07:54:59	Apogee: 190 kilometres (120 mi)					
28 March; 09:30	(United States) HAD		(Australia) Woomera LA-2		(Australia) WRE	
28 March; 09:30		WRE	Suborbital	Aeronomy	28 March	Successful
28 March; 09:30	Apogee: 133 kilometres (83 mi)					
28 March; 19:06	(United States) Nike-Apache		(United States) Wallops Island		(United States) NASA	
28 March; 19:06		Michigan	Suborbital	Aeronomy	28 March	Successful
28 March; 19:06	Apogee: 190 kilometres (120 mi)					
28 March; 20:06:00	(United States) Nike-Apache		(United States) Wallops Island		(United States) NASA	
28 March; 20:06:00		GCA	Suborbital	Ionospheric	28 March	Successful
28 March; 20:06:00	Apogee: 161 kilometres (100 mi)					
28 March; 20:11:55	(United States) Saturn I (C-1)		(United States) Cape Canaveral LC-34		(United States) NASA	
28 March; 20:11:55		NASA	Suborbital	Test flight	28 March	Successful
28 March; 20:11:55	Apogee: 129 kilometres (80 mi)					
28 March	(Soviet Union) R-14 Chusovaya		(Soviet Union) Plesetsk		(Soviet Union) RVSN	
28 March		RVSN	Suborbital	Missile test	28 March	Launch failure
28 March	(Soviet Union) R-12 Dvina		(Soviet Union) Makat		(Soviet Union) MVS	
28 March		MVS	Suborbital	Missile test	28 March	Successful
28 March	Apogee: 402 kilometres (250 mi)					
29 March; 02:57	(United States) Nike-Cajun		(United States) Kwajalein		(United States) US Navy	
29 March; 02:57		Michigan	Suborbital	Aeronomy	29 March	Successful
29 March; 02:57	Apogee: 177 kilometres (110 mi)					
30 March; 08:45	(United States) HGM-25A Titan I		(United States) Vandenberg LC-395A-2		(United States) Strategic Air Command	
30 March; 08:45		Strategic Air Command	Suborbital	Target	30 March	Successful
30 March; 08:45	Apogee: 1,000 kilometres (620 mi)					
30 March	(Soviet Union) R-16U		(Soviet Union) Baikonur Site 41/4		(Soviet Union) RVSN	
30 March		RVSN	Suborbital	Missile test	30 March	Successful
30 March	Apogee: 1,210 kilometres (750 mi)					
30 March	(United States) Nike-Zeus 3		(United States) Kwajalein		(United States) US Army	
30 March		US Army	Suborbital	Missile test	30 March	Successful
30 March	Apogee: 200 kilometres (120 mi)					
March	(United States) Nike-Apache		(United States) White Sands		(United States) US Army	
March		US Army	Suborbital	REV Test	March	Successful
March	Apogee: 100 kilometres (62 mi)					
March	(United States) Nike-Apache		(United States) White Sands		(United States) US Army	
March		US Army	Suborbital	REV Test	March	Successful
March	Apogee: 100 kilometres (62 mi)					
