= 1963 in spaceflight (October–December) =

This is a list of spaceflights launched between October and December 1963. For an overview of the whole year, see 1963 in spaceflight.

== Orbital launches ==
- ← Jan
- Feb
- Mar
- Apr
- May
- Jun
- Jul
- Aug
- Sep
- Oct
- Nov
- Dec →

| Date and time (UTC) | Rocket | Flight number | Launch site | | LSP | |
| Date and time (UTC) | Payload (⚀ = CubeSat) | Operator | Orbit | Function | Decay (UTC) | Outcome |
| Date and time (UTC) | Remarks | | | | | |
|---|---|---|---|---|---|---|
=== October ===
| 17 October; 02:37 | (United States) Atlas LV-3A Agena-D | | (United States) Cape Canaveral LC-13 | | (United States) US Air Force | |
| 17 October; 02:37 | (United States) Vela 1A | US Air Force | High Earth | Nuclear test detection Radiation research | In orbit | Successful |
| 17 October; 02:37 | (United States) Vela 1B | US Air Force | High Earth | Nuclear test detection Radiation research | In orbit | Successful |
| 17 October; 02:37 | (United States) ERS-12 | US Air Force | Highly elliptical | Particle research | 5 February 1966 | Successful |
| 17 October; 02:37 | Vela spacecraft deactivated after five years. | | | | | |
| 18 October; 09:29:58 | (Soviet Union) Vostok-2 | | (Soviet Union) Baikonur Site 1/5 | | (Soviet Union) | |
| 18 October; 09:29:58 | (Soviet Union) Kosmos 20 (Zenit-2 №13) | | Low Earth | Optical imaging | 26 October | Successful |
| 24 October | (Soviet Union) Kosmos 63S1 | | (Soviet Union) Kapustin Yar Mayak-2 | | (Soviet Union) | |
| 24 October | (Soviet Union) DS-A1 №4 | | Intended: Low Earth | Technology; Radiation | 24 October | Launch failure |
| 24 October | Second stage malfunctioned 353 seconds into the launch. | | | | | |
| 25 October; 18:59:27 | (United States) Atlas LV-3A Agena-D | | (United States) Point Arguello LC-2-3 | | (United States) US Air Force | |
| 25 October; 18:59:27 | (United States) OPS 2196 (KH-7 3/4003/AFP-206 SV-953) | US Air Force/NRO | Low Earth | Optical imaging | 29 October | Successful |
| 29 October; 21:19 | (United States) Thrust Augmented Thor SLV-2A Agena-D | | (United States) Vandenberg LC-75-3-4 | | (United States) US Air Force | |
| 29 October; 21:19 | (United States) OPS 2437 (KH-5 10/9059A) | US Air Force/NRO | Low Earth | Optical imaging | 21 January 1964 | Successful |
| 29 October; 21:19 | (United States) SRV 602 | US Air Force/NRO | Low Earth | Film return | September | Successful |
| 29 October; 21:19 | (United States) Pundit 1 (P-11 4001) | US Air Force | Low Earth | ELINT | 23 May 1965 | Successful |
← Jan; Feb; Mar; Apr; May; Jun; Jul; Aug; Sep; Oct; Nov; Dec →; === November ===
| 1 November; 08:56 | (Soviet Union) Polyot | | (Soviet Union) Baikonur Site 31/6 | | (Soviet Union) | |
| 1 November; 08:56 | (Soviet Union) Polyot 1 (I-150/I-2B №1) | | Low Earth | ASAT test Technology | 16 October 1982 | Successful |
| 1 November; 08:56 | Maiden flight of Polyot rocket, non-intercept flight test of I-2B antisatellite weapon. | | | | | |
| 9 November; 20:27:54 | (United States) Thor SLV-2 Agena-D | | (United States) Vandenberg LC-75-1-2 | | (United States) US Air Force | |
| 9 November; 20:27:54 | (United States) OPS 2268 (KH-4 24/9060) | US Air Force/NRO | Low Earth | Optical imaging | 9 November | Launch failure |
| 9 November; 20:27:54 | (United States) SRV 632 | US Air Force/NRO | Low Earth | Film return | 9 November | Launch failure |
| 9 November; 20:27:54 | Failed to orbit. | | | | | |
| 11 November; 06:23:35 | (Soviet Union) Molniya | | (Soviet Union) Baikonur Site 1/5 | | (Soviet Union) | |
| 11 November; 06:23:35 | (Soviet Union) Kosmos 21 (Venera 3MV-1A №1) | | Intended: Heliocentric; Achieved: Low Earth | Venus flyby | 14 November | Launch failure |
| 11 November; 06:23:35 | Loss of control during coast phase, upper stage fired at incorrect orientation, spacecraft deployed into useless orbit. | | | | | |
| 16 November; 10:34 | (Soviet Union) Voskhod | | (Soviet Union) Baikonur Site 1/5 | | (Soviet Union) | |
| 16 November; 10:34 | (Soviet Union) Kosmos 22 (Zenit-4 №1) | | Low Earth | Optical imaging | 22 November | Successful |
| 16 November; 10:34 | Maiden flight of Voskhod rocket | | | | | |
| 27 November; 02:30:01 | (United States) Delta C | | (United States) Cape Canaveral LC-17B | | (United States) US Air Force | |
| 27 November; 02:30:01 | (United States) Explorer 18 (IMP-A/IMP-1/S-74) | NASA | Highly elliptical | Magnetospheric | 30 November 1965 | Successful |
| 27 November; 02:30:01 | Maiden flight of Delta C, spacecraft ceased operations on 10 May 1965. | | | | | |
| 27 November; 19:03:23 | (United States) Atlas LV-3C Centaur-B | AC-2 | (United States) Cape Canaveral LC-36A | | (United States) NASA | |
| 27 November; 19:03:23 | | NASA | Low Earth | Test flight | 30 July 1989 | Successful |
| 27 November; 19:03:23 | Only flight of Atlas LV-3C Centaur-B, first successful Atlas-Centaur launch, first firing of a rocket engine fuelled by liquid hydrogen in space. | | | | | |
| 27 November; 21:15:40 | (United States) Thor SLV-2 Agena-D | | (United States) Point Arguello LC-1-1 | | (United States) US Air Force | |
| 27 November; 21:15:40 | (United States) OPS 2260 (KH-4 25/9061) | US Air Force/NRO | Low Earth | Optical imaging | 15 December | Successful |
| 27 November; 21:15:40 | (United States) SRV 637 | US Air Force/NRO | Low Earth | Film return | Unknown | Spacecraft failure |
| 27 November; 21:15:40 | First Thor launch from Point Arguello, SRV failed to deorbit. | | | | | |
| 28 November | (Soviet Union) Vostok-2 | | (Soviet Union) Baikonur Site 1/5 | | (Soviet Union) | |
| 28 November | (Soviet Union) Zenit-2 №14 | | Intended: Low Earth | Optical imaging | 28 November | Launch failure |
| 28 November | Upper stage failure, spacecraft commanded to self-destruct. | | | | | |
← Jan; Feb; Mar; Apr; May; Jun; Jul; Aug; Sep; Oct; Nov; Dec →; === December ===
| 5 December; 21:51 | (United States) Thor DSV-2A Ablestar | | (United States) Vandenberg LC-75-1-1 | | (United States) US Air Force | |
| 5 December; 21:51 | (United States) Transit 5BN-2 | US Navy | Low Earth | Navigation | In orbit | Successful |
| 5 December; 21:51 | (United States) Transit 5E-3 | US Navy | Low Earth | Radiation | In orbit | Successful |
| 5 December; 21:51 | Transit 5BN-2 carried a SNAP-9A nuclear power system, and became the first operational navigation satellite. | | | | | |
| 13 December; 14:15 | (Soviet Union) Kosmos 63S1 | | (Soviet Union) Kapustin Yar Mayak-2 | | (Soviet Union) | |
| 13 December; 14:15 | (Soviet Union) Kosmos 23 (Omega №2) | | Low Earth | Technology | 27 March 1964 | Successful |
| 18 December; 21:45:30 | (United States) Atlas LV-3A Agena-D | | (United States) Point Arguello LC-2-3 | | (United States) US Air Force | |
| 18 December; 21:45:30 | (United States) OPS 2372 (KH-7 4/4004/AFP-206 SV-954) | US Air Force/NRO | Low Earth | Optical imaging | 20 December | Successful |
| 19 December; 09:28:58 | (Soviet Union) Vostok-2 | | (Soviet Union) Baikonur Site 1/5 | | (Soviet Union) | |
| 19 December; 09:28:58 | (Soviet Union) Kosmos 24 (Zenit-2 №15) | | Low Earth | Optical imaging | 28 December | Successful |
| 19 December; 18:49:25 | (United States) Scout X-4 | | (United States) Point Arguello LC-D | | (United States) US Air Force | |
| 19 December; 18:49:25 | (United States) Explorer 19 (AD-A/S-56b) | NASA | Medium Earth | Air density | 10 May 1981 | Partial launch failure Partial spacecraft failure |
| 19 December; 18:49:25 | Achieved lower than planned orbit, tracking beacon did not have enough power to communicate with ground stations, but spacecraft could still be tracked by visual observation. | | | | | |
| 21 December; 09:30:00 | (United States) Delta B | | (United States) Cape Canaveral LC-17B | | (United States) US Air Force | |
| 21 December; 09:30:00 | (United States) Tiros-8 (Tiros-H/A-53) | ESSA | Low Earth | Weather | In orbit | Successful |
| 21 December; 21:45 | (United States) Thrust Augmented Thor SLV-2A Agena-D | | (United States) Vandenberg LC-75-1-2 | | (United States) US Air Force | |
| 21 December; 21:45 | (United States) OPS 1388 (KH-4 26/9062) | US Air Force/NRO | Low Earth | Optical imaging | 8 January 1964 | Partial spacecraft failure |
| 21 December; 21:45 | (United States) SRV 642 | US Air Force/NRO | Low Earth | Film return | December | Successful |
| 21 December; 21:45 | (United States) Pundit 2 (P-11 4101) | US Air Force | Low Earth | ELINT | 7 November 1964 | Successful |
| 21 December; 21:45 | Final KH-4 flight, large amount of damage to film due to corona effect. | | | | | |
← Jan; Feb; Mar; Apr; May; Jun; Jul; Aug; Sep; Oct; Nov; Dec →

== Suborbital flights ==
| Date and time (UTC) | Rocket | Flight number | Launch site | | LSP | |
| Date and time (UTC) | Payload (⚀ = CubeSat) | Operator | Orbit | Function | Decay (UTC) | Outcome |
| Date and time (UTC) | Remarks | | | | | |
|---|---|---|---|---|---|---|
| 1 October; 10:47 | (United States) Nike-Apache | | (United States) Eglin | | (United States) US Air Force | |
| 1 October; 10:47 | | AFCRL | Suborbital | Aeronomy | 1 October | Successful |
| 1 October; 10:47 | Apogee: 182 kilometres (113 mi) | | | | | |
| 1 October; 17:00 | (United States) Aerobee-150 (Hi) | | (United States) White Sands LC-35 | | (United States) NASA | |
| 1 October; 17:00 | | NASA | Suborbital | Solar | 1 October | Successful |
| 1 October; 17:00 | Apogee: 219 kilometres (136 mi) | | | | | |
| 1 October; 19:39:05 | (United States) UGM-27 Polaris A2 | | (United States) USS Andrew Jackson, ETR | | (United States) US Navy | |
| 1 October; 19:39:05 | | US Navy | Suborbital | Missile test | 1 October | Successful |
| 1 October; 19:39:05 | Apogee: 1,000 kilometres (620 mi) | | | | | |
| 1 October | (Soviet Union) R-12 Dvina | | (Soviet Union) Makat | | (Soviet Union) MVS | |
| 1 October | | MVS | Suborbital | Missile test | 1 October | Successful |
| 1 October | Apogee: 402 kilometres (250 mi) | | | | | |
| 1 October | (Soviet Union) R-16U | | (Soviet Union) Baikonur Site 41/3 | | (Soviet Union) RVSN | |
| 1 October | | RVSN | Suborbital | Missile test | 1 October | Successful |
| 1 October | Apogee: 1,210 kilometres (750 mi) | | | | | |
| 2 October; 15:10 | (United Kingdom) Skylark-7 | | (Australia) Woomera LA-2 | | (United Kingdom) RAE | |
| 2 October; 15:10 | | Cambridge; UCL | Suborbital | Ionospheric | 2 October | Successful |
| 2 October; 15:10 | Apogee: 148 kilometres (92 mi) | | | | | |
| 2 October | (United States) Nike-Tomahawk 9A | | (United States) Barking Sands | | (United States) Sandia | |
| 2 October | | Sandia | Suborbital | Test flight | 2 October | Launch failure |
| 2 October | Apogee: 10 kilometres (6.2 mi) | | | | | |
| 4 October; 05:17:49 | (United States) SM-65F Atlas | | (United States) Vandenberg LC-576G | | (United States) US Air Force | |
| 4 October; 05:17:49 | | US Air Force | Suborbital | Missile test | 4 October | Launch failure |
| 4 October; 05:18:07 | (United States) UGM-27 Polaris A3 | | (United States) USNS Observation Island, ETR | | (United States) US Navy | |
| 4 October; 05:18:07 | | US Navy | Suborbital | Missile test | 4 October | Successful |
| 4 October; 05:18:07 | Apogee: 1,000 kilometres (620 mi) | | | | | |
| 4 October | (United States) LGM-30B Minuteman IB | | (United States) Vandenberg LC-394A-6 | | (United States) US Air Force | |
| 4 October | | US Air Force | Suborbital | Missile test | 4 October | Successful |
| 4 October | Apogee: 1,300 kilometres (810 mi) | | | | | |
| 4 October | (Soviet Union) R-12 Dvina | | (Soviet Union) Makat | | (Soviet Union) MVS | |
| 4 October | | MVS | Suborbital | Missile test | 4 October | Successful |
| 4 October | Apogee: 402 kilometres (250 mi) | | | | | |
| 7 October; 20:00 | (United States) Nike-Apache | | (Canada) Churchill | | (United States) NASA | |
| 7 October; 20:00 | | BRL | Suborbital | Magnetospheric | 7 October | Successful |
| 7 October; 20:00 | Apogee: 165 kilometres (103 mi) | | | | | |
| 7 October; 21:31 | (United States) SM-65D Atlas | | (United States) Vandenberg LC-576B-3 | | (United States) Strategic Air Command | |
| 7 October; 21:31 | | Strategic Air Command | Suborbital | Missile test | 7 October | Launch failure |
| 7 October; 21:31 | Apogee: 10 kilometres (6.2 mi) | | | | | |
| 9 October; 23:14 | (United States) Nike-Apache | | (United States) Wallops Island | | (United States) NASA | |
| 9 October; 23:14 | | NASA | Suborbital | Aeronomy | 9 October | Successful |
| 9 October; 23:14 | Apogee: 158 kilometres (98 mi) | | | | | |
| 10 October; 10:33 | (United States) Aerobee-150 (Hi) | | (United States) White Sands LC-35 | | (United States) NASA | |
| 10 October; 10:33 | | NASA | Suborbital | UV Astronomy | 10 October | Launch failure |
| 10 October; 10:33 | Apogee: 2 kilometres (1.2 mi) | | | | | |
| 10 October; 23:13 | (United States) Nike-Apache | | (United States) Wallops Island | | (United States) NASA | |
| 10 October; 23:13 | | NASA | Suborbital | Aeronomy | 10 October | Successful |
| 10 October; 23:13 | Apogee: 158 kilometres (98 mi) | | | | | |
| 10 October | | | (Soviet Union) Plesetsk | | (Soviet Union) MVS | |
| 10 October | | MVS | Suborbital | Missile test | 10 October | Successful |
| 10 October | Apogee: 200 kilometres (120 mi) | | | | | |
| 11 October | (Soviet Union) R-12 Dvina | | (Soviet Union) Plesetsk | | (Soviet Union) MVS | |
| 11 October | | MVS | Suborbital | Missile test | 11 October | Successful |
| 11 October | Apogee: 402 kilometres (250 mi) | | | | | |
| 12 October | | | (Soviet Union) Plesetsk | | (Soviet Union) MVS | |
| 12 October | | MVS | Suborbital | Missile test | 12 October | Successful |
| 12 October | Apogee: 200 kilometres (120 mi) | | | | | |
| 14 October; 05:34 | (Canada) Black Brant II | | (Canada) Churchill | | (Canada) DRTE | |
| 14 October; 05:34 | | DRTE | Suborbital | Ionospheric; Auroral | 14 October | Successful |
| 14 October; 05:34 | Apogee: 145 kilometres (90 mi) | | | | | |
| 14 October | (United States) MGM-31 Pershing I | | (United States) Fort Wingate | | (United States) US Army | |
| 14 October | | US Army | Suborbital | Missile test | 14 October | Successful |
| 14 October | Apogee: 250 kilometres (160 mi) | | | | | |
| 14 October | (Soviet Union) R-7A Semyorka | | (Soviet Union) Baikonur | | (Soviet Union) RVSN | |
| 14 October | | RVSN | Suborbital | Missile test | 14 October | Successful |
| 14 October | Apogee: 1,350 kilometres (840 mi) | | | | | |
| 15 October; 09:51 | (United Kingdom) Skylark-7C | | (Australia) Woomera LA-2 | | (United Kingdom) RAE | |
| 15 October; 09:51 | | UCL/QUB | Suborbital | Aeronomy | 15 October | Successful |
| 15 October; 09:51 | Apogee: 210 kilometres (130 mi) | | | | | |
| 15 October; 11:48 | (United Kingdom) Skylark-7 | | (Australia) Woomera LA-2 | | (United Kingdom) RAE | |
| 15 October; 11:48 | | UCL | Suborbital | Aeronomy | 15 October | Successful |
| 15 October; 11:48 | Apogee: 139 kilometres (86 mi) | | | | | |
| 15 October; 15:09 | (United Kingdom) Skylark-7 | | (Australia) Woomera LA-2 | | (United Kingdom) RAE | |
| 15 October; 15:09 | | UCL | Suborbital | Aeronomy | 15 October | Successful |
| 15 October; 15:09 | Apogee: 140 kilometres (87 mi) | | | | | |
| 15 October; 16:05 | (United States) Aerobee-150 (Hi) | | (United States) White Sands LC-35 | | (United States) NASA | |
| 15 October; 16:05 | | NASA | Suborbital | Solar | 15 October | Successful |
| 15 October; 16:05 | Apogee: 197 kilometres (122 mi) | | | | | |
| 15 October; 19:22 | (United Kingdom) Skylark-7C | | (Australia) Woomera LA-2 | | (United Kingdom) RAE | |
| 15 October; 19:22 | | UCL/QUB | Suborbital | Aeronomy | 15 October | Successful |
| 15 October; 19:22 | Apogee: 180 kilometres (110 mi) | | | | | |
| 15 October | (Soviet Union) R-12 Dvina | | (Soviet Union) Plesetsk | | (Soviet Union) MVS | |
| 15 October | | MVS | Suborbital | Missile test | 15 October | Successful |
| 15 October | Apogee: 402 kilometres (250 mi) | | | | | |
| 16 October; 16:30:02 | (United States) UGM-27 Polaris A2 | | (United States) USS Andrew Jackson, ETR | | (United States) US Navy | |
| 16 October; 16:30:02 | | US Navy | Suborbital | Missile test | 16 October | Successful |
| 16 October; 16:30:02 | Apogee: 1,000 kilometres (620 mi) | | | | | |
| 16 October | (United States) MGM-31 Pershing I | | (United States) Fort Wingate | | (United States) US Army | |
| 16 October | | US Army | Suborbital | Missile test | 16 October | Successful |
| 16 October | Apogee: 250 kilometres (160 mi) | | | | | |
| 17 October; 10:52 | (United Kingdom) Black Knight 201 | | (Australia) Woomera LA-5 | | (Europe) (United Kingdom) ELDO/RAE | |
| 17 October; 10:52 | | ELDO/RAE | Suborbital | Missile test | 17 October | Successful |
| 17 October; 10:52 | Apogee: 527 kilometres (327 mi) | | | | | |
| 17 October; 16:50 | (United States) Aerobee-150A | | (United States) Wallops Island | | (United States) NASA | |
| 17 October; 16:50 | | CNES | Suborbital | Ionospheric | 17 October | Successful |
| 17 October; 16:50 | Apogee: 187 kilometres (116 mi) | | | | | |
| 17 October | (United States) LGM-30A Minuteman IA | | (United States) Vandenberg LC-394A-3 | | (United States) Strategic Air Command | |
| 17 October | | Strategic Air Command | Suborbital | Missile test | 17 October | Successful |
| 17 October | Apogee: 1,300 kilometres (810 mi) | | | | | |
| 18 October; 07:09 | (France) Véronique | | (Algeria) Hammaguira Blandine | | (France) CNES | |
| 18 October; 07:09 | | CERMA | Suborbital | Biological research | 18 October | Successful |
| 18 October; 07:09 | Apogee: 155 kilometres (96 mi) | | | | | |
| 18 October; 09:20 | (Canada) Black Brant II | | (Canada) Churchill | | (Canada) CARDE | |
| 18 October; 09:20 | | CARDE | Suborbital | Aeronomy | 18 October | Successful |
| 18 October; 09:20 | Apogee: 140 kilometres (87 mi) | | | | | |
| 18 October | (Soviet Union) R-9 Desna | | (Soviet Union) Baikonur | | (Soviet Union) RVSN | |
| 18 October | | RVSN | Suborbital | Missile test | 18 October | Launch failure |
| 18 October | (United States) MGM-31 Pershing I | | (United States) Fort Wingate | | (United States) US Army | |
| 18 October | | US Army | Suborbital | Missile test | 18 October | Successful |
| 18 October | Apogee: 250 kilometres (160 mi) | | | | | |
| 21 October | (United States) MGM-31 Pershing I | | (United States) Fort Wingate | | (United States) US Army | |
| 21 October | | US Army | Suborbital | Missile test | 21 October | Successful |
| 21 October | Apogee: 250 kilometres (160 mi) | | | | | |
| 22 October | (Soviet Union) R-16U | | (Soviet Union) Plesetsk PU-11 | | (Soviet Union) RVSN | |
| 22 October | | RVSN | Suborbital | Missile test | 22 October | Successful |
| 22 October | Apogee: 1,210 kilometres (750 mi) | | | | | |
| 22 October | | | (Soviet Union) Plesetsk | | (Soviet Union) MVS | |
| 22 October | | MVS | Suborbital | Missile test | 22 October | Successful |
| 22 October | Apogee: 200 kilometres (120 mi) | | | | | |
| 23 October | (United States) MGM-31 Pershing I | | (United States) Fort Wingate | | (United States) US Army | |
| 23 October | | US Army | Suborbital | Missile test | 23 October | Launch failure |
| 23 October | (Soviet Union) R-16U | | (Soviet Union) Baikonur Site 41/3 | | (Soviet Union) RVSN | |
| 23 October | | RVSN | Suborbital | Missile test | 23 October | Successful |
| 23 October | Apogee: 1,210 kilometres (750 mi) | | | | | |
| 23 October | | | (Soviet Union) Plesetsk | | (Soviet Union) MVS | |
| 23 October | | MVS | Suborbital | Missile test | 23 October | Successful |
| 23 October | Apogee: 200 kilometres (120 mi) | | | | | |
| 23 October | (United States) Nike-Zeus 3 | | (United States) White Sands LC-38 | | (United States) US Army | |
| 23 October | | US Army | Suborbital | Missile test | 23 October | Successful |
| 23 October | Apogee: 200 kilometres (120 mi) | | | | | |
| 24 October; 05:30 | (France) Véronique | | (Algeria) Hammaguira Blandine | | (France) CNES | |
| 24 October; 05:30 | | CERMA | Suborbital | Biological research | 24 October | Launch failure |
| 24 October; 05:30 | Apogee: 88 kilometres (55 mi) | | | | | |
| 24 October | (United States) UGM-27 Polaris A2 | | (United States) USS Sam Houston, ETR | | (United States) US Navy | |
| 24 October | | US Navy | Suborbital | Missile test | 24 October | Successful |
| 24 October | Apogee: 1,000 kilometres (620 mi) | | | | | |
| 24 October | (United States) UGM-27 Polaris A2 | | (United States) USS Sam Houston, ETR | | (United States) US Navy | |
| 24 October | | US Navy | Suborbital | Missile test | 24 October | Successful |
| 24 October | Apogee: 1,000 kilometres (620 mi) | | | | | |
| 24 October | (United States) UGM-27 Polaris A2 | | (United States) USS Sam Houston, ETR | | (United States) US Navy | |
| 24 October | | US Navy | Suborbital | Missile test | 24 October | Successful |
| 24 October | Apogee: 1,000 kilometres (620 mi) | | | | | |
| 24 October | (United States) UGM-27 Polaris A2 | | (United States) USS Sam Houston, ETR | | (United States) US Navy | |
| 24 October | | US Navy | Suborbital | Missile test | 24 October | Successful |
| 24 October | Apogee: 1,000 kilometres (620 mi) | | | | | |
| 25 October | (Soviet Union) R-5B Pobeda | | (Soviet Union) Plesetsk | | (Soviet Union) AN | |
| 25 October | | AN | Suborbital | Aeronomy | 25 October | Successful |
| 25 October | Apogee: 500 kilometres (310 mi) | | | | | |
| 26 October; 02:00 | (Canada) Black Brant II | | (Canada) Churchill | | (Canada) DRTE | |
| 26 October; 02:00 | | DRTE | Suborbital | Ionospheric; Auroral | 26 October | Successful |
| 26 October; 02:00 | Apogee: 145 kilometres (90 mi) | | | | | |
| 26 October; 16:14:04 | (United States) UGM-27 Polaris A3 | | (United States) USS Andrew Jackson, ETR | | (United States) US Navy | |
| 26 October; 16:14:04 | | US Navy | Suborbital | Missile test | 26 October | Successful |
| 26 October; 16:14:04 | Apogee: 1,000 kilometres (620 mi) | | | | | |
| 26 October | (Soviet Union) R-12 Dvina | | (Soviet Union) Plesetsk | | (Soviet Union) MVS | |
| 26 October | | MVS | Suborbital | Missile test | 26 October | Successful |
| 26 October | Apogee: 402 kilometres (250 mi) | | | | | |
| 28 October; 03:15 | (United States) SM-65F Atlas | | (United States) Cape Canaveral LC-11 | | (United States) US Air Force | |
| 28 October; 03:15 | | AFCRL | Suborbital | REV test | 28 October | Launch failure |
| 28 October; 03:15 | Apogee: 500 kilometres (310 mi) | | | | | |
| 28 October | (United States) MGM-31 Pershing I | | (United States) Fort Wingate | | (United States) US Army | |
| 28 October | | US Army | Suborbital | Missile test | 28 October | Successful |
| 28 October | Apogee: 250 kilometres (160 mi) | | | | | |
| 28 October | | | (Soviet Union) Plesetsk | | (Soviet Union) MVS | |
| 28 October | | MVS | Suborbital | Missile test | 28 October | Successful |
| 28 October | Apogee: 200 kilometres (120 mi) | | | | | |
| 29 October; 02:53 | (Canada) Black Brant II | | (Canada) Churchill | | (Canada) CARDE | |
| 29 October; 02:53 | | CARDE | Suborbital | Aeronomy | 29 October | Successful |
| 29 October; 02:53 | Apogee: 140 kilometres (87 mi) | | | | | |
| 29 October | | | (Soviet Union) Plesetsk | | (Soviet Union) MVS | |
| 29 October | | MVS | Suborbital | Missile test | 29 October | Successful |
| 29 October | Apogee: 200 kilometres (120 mi) | | | | | |
| 30 October; 14:26 | (United Kingdom) Skylark-7C | | (Australia) Woomera LA-2 | | (United Kingdom) RAE | |
| 30 October; 14:26 | | RAE | Suborbital | Test flight | 30 October | Successful |
| 30 October; 14:26 | Apogee: 186 kilometres (116 mi) | | | | | |
| 30 October | (France) Dragon | | (Algeria) Hammaguira Bacchus | | (France) CNES | |
| 30 October | | DMA | Suborbital | Test flight | 30 October | Successful |
| 30 October | Apogee: 470 kilometres (290 mi) | | | | | |
| 31 October; 16:50 | (United States) Aerobee-150A | | (United States) Wallops Island LA-1 | | (United States) NASA | |
| 31 October; 16:50 | | CNES | Suborbital | Ionospheric | 31 October | Successful |
| 31 October; 16:50 | Apogee: 187 kilometres (116 mi) | | | | | |
| 31 October; 18:00 | (United States) Nike-Cajun | | (United States) Eglin | | (United States) US Air Force | |
| 31 October; 18:00 | | US Air Force | Suborbital | Ionospheric | 31 October | Successful |
| 31 October; 18:00 | Apogee: 112 kilometres (70 mi) | | | | | |
| 31 October; 21:17 | (United States) Nike-Apache | | (United States) Wallops Island LA-2 | | (United States) NASA | |
| 31 October; 21:17 | | NASA | Suborbital | Test flight | 31 October | Successful |
| 31 October; 21:17 | Apogee: 134 kilometres (83 mi) | | | | | |
| 31 October | (United States) LGM-30A Minuteman IA | | (United States) Vandenberg LC-394A-5 | | (United States) Strategic Air Command | |
| 31 October | | Strategic Air Command | Suborbital | Missile test | 31 October | Successful |
| 31 October | Apogee: 1,300 kilometres (810 mi) | | | | | |
| October | (United States) Nike-Apache | | (United States) White Sands | | (United States) US Army | |
| October | | US Army | Suborbital | Target | October | Successful |
| October | Apogee: 100 kilometres (62 mi) | | | | | |
| 1 November; 20:14:54 | (United States) LGM-25C Titan II | | (United States) Cape Canaveral LC-15 | | (United States) US Air Force | |
| 1 November; 20:14:54 | | AFCRL | Suborbital | Test flight | 1 November | Successful |
| 1 November; 20:14:54 | Apogee: 1,300 kilometres (810 mi) | | | | | |
| 1 November | (United States) Nike-Zeus 3 | | (United States) White Sands LC-38 | | (United States) US Army | |
| 1 November | | US Army | Suborbital | Missile test | 1 November | Successful |
| 1 November | Apogee: 200 kilometres (120 mi) | | | | | |
| 1 November | | | (Soviet Union) Plesetsk | | (Soviet Union) MVS | |
| 1 November | | MVS | Suborbital | Missile test | 1 November | Successful |
| 1 November | Apogee: 200 kilometres (120 mi) | | | | | |
| 1 November | | | (Soviet Union) Plesetsk | | (Soviet Union) MVS | |
| 1 November | | MVS | Suborbital | Missile test | 1 November | Successful |
| 1 November | Apogee: 200 kilometres (120 mi) | | | | | |
| 2 November | (United States) LGM-30A Minuteman IA | | (United States) Vandenberg LC-394A-2 | | (United States) Strategic Air Command | |
| 2 November | | Strategic Air Command | Suborbital | Missile test | 2 November | Successful |
| 2 November | Apogee: 1,300 kilometres (810 mi) | | | | | |
| 4 November; 09:34 | (United States) SM-65D Atlas | | (United States) Vandenberg LC-576A-1 | | (United States) Strategic Air Command | |
| 4 November; 09:34 | | Strategic Air Command | Suborbital | REV Test | 4 November | Successful |
| 4 November; 09:34 | Apogee: 1,800 kilometres (1,100 mi) | | | | | |
| 4 November; 10:00 | (United States) Nike-Apache | | (United States) White Sands | | (United States) US Air Force | |
| 4 November; 10:00 | | AFCRL | Suborbital | Aeronomy | 4 November | Successful |
| 4 November; 10:00 | Apogee: 215 kilometres (134 mi) | | | | | |
| 4 November; 10:31 | (United States) Nike-Cajun | | (United States) Kwajalein | | (United States) US Navy | |
| 4 November; 10:31 | | Michigan | Suborbital | Aeronomy | 4 November | Successful |
| 4 November; 10:31 | Apogee: 150 kilometres (93 mi) | | | | | |
| 4 November; 12:26 | (United States) Nike-Cajun | | (United States) Kwajalein | | (United States) US Navy | |
| 4 November; 12:26 | | Michigan | Suborbital | Aeronomy | 4 November | Successful |
| 4 November; 12:26 | Apogee: 150 kilometres (93 mi) | | | | | |
| 4 November; 15:10 | (United States) Aerobee-150 (Hi) | | (United States) White Sands LC-35 | | (United States) KPNO | |
| 4 November; 15:10 | | KPNO | Suborbital | Aeronomy | 4 November | Successful |
| 4 November; 15:10 | Apogee: 200 kilometres (120 mi) | | | | | |
| 5 November; 00:00 | (United States) Nike-Cajun | | (United States) White Sands | | (United States) US Air Force | |
| 5 November; 00:00 | | AFCRL | Suborbital | Aeronomy | 5 November | Successful |
| 5 November; 00:00 | Apogee: 164 kilometres (102 mi) | | | | | |
| 5 November | (Soviet Union) UR-200 | | (Soviet Union) Baikonur Site 90/19 | | (Soviet Union) RVSN | |
| 5 November | | RVSN | Suborbital | Missile test | 5 November | Launch failure |
| 5 November | (Soviet Union) R-12 Dvina | | (Soviet Union) Plesetsk | | (Soviet Union) MVS | |
| 5 November | | MVS | Suborbital | Missile test | 5 November | Successful |
| 5 November | Apogee: 402 kilometres (250 mi) | | | | | |
| 5 November | (Soviet Union) R-9 Desna | | (Soviet Union) Baikonur | | (Soviet Union) RVSN | |
| 5 November | | RVSN | Suborbital | Missile test | 5 November | Successful |
| 5 November | Apogee: 1,160 kilometres (720 mi) | | | | | |
| 6 November | (United States) Nike-Cajun | | (United States) Eglin | | (United States) US Air Force | |
| 6 November | | US Air Force | Suborbital | Aeronomy | 6 November | Successful |
| 6 November | Apogee: 100 kilometres (62 mi) | | | | | |
| 7 November; 17:00:02 | (United States) LGM-30B Minuteman IB | | (United States) Cape Canaveral LC-32B | | (United States) US Air Force | |
| 7 November; 17:00:02 | | US Air Force | Suborbital | Missile test | 7 November | Launch failure |
| 7 November; 17:00:02 | Apogee: 1 kilometre (0.62 mi) | | | | | |
| 7 November | (Canada) Black Brant III | | (United States) Point Arguello LC-A | | (United States) US Navy | |
| 7 November | | US Navy | Suborbital | Test flight | 7 November | Successful |
| 7 November | Apogee: 116 kilometres (72 mi) | | | | | |
| 9 November; 16:26 | (United States) Nike-Cajun | | (United States) Kwajalein | | (United States) US Navy | |
| 9 November; 16:26 | | Michigan | Suborbital | Aeronomy | 9 November | Successful |
| 9 November; 16:26 | Apogee: 141 kilometres (88 mi) | | | | | |
| 9 November | (United States) LGM-25C Titan II | | (United States) Vandenberg LC-395C | | (United States) US Air Force | |
| 9 November | | US Air Force | Suborbital | Missile test | 9 November | Successful |
| 9 November | Apogee: 1,300 kilometres (810 mi) | | | | | |
| 11 November; 18:48:05 | (United States) UGM-27 Polaris A3 | | (United States) USS Andrew Jackson, ETR | | (United States) US Navy | |
| 11 November; 18:48:05 | | US Navy | Suborbital | Missile test | 11 November | Successful |
| 11 November; 18:48:05 | Apogee: 1,000 kilometres (620 mi) | | | | | |
| 12 November; 18:58 | (United States) Aerobee-150A | | (United States) Wallops Island | | (United States) NASA | |
| 12 November; 18:58 | | Johns Hopkins | Suborbital | Aeronomy | 12 November | Successful |
| 12 November; 18:58 | Apogee: 223 kilometres (139 mi) | | | | | |
| 13 November; 16:27:57 | (United States) LGM-30B Minuteman IB | | (United States) Cape Canaveral LC-31B | | (United States) US Air Force | |
| 13 November; 16:27:57 | | US Air Force | Suborbital | Missile test | 13 November | Successful |
| 13 November; 16:27:57 | Apogee: 1,300 kilometres (810 mi) | | | | | |
| 13 November; 22:35:39 | (United States) SM-65D Atlas | | (United States) Vandenberg LC-576B-2 | | (United States) Strategic Air Command | |
| 13 November; 22:35:39 | | Strategic Air Command | Suborbital | Missile test | 13 November | Launch failure |
| 13 November; 22:35:39 | Apogee: 100 kilometres (62 mi) | | | | | |
| 13 November; 23:00 | (United States) Aerobee-150 (Hi) | | (United States) White Sands LC-35 | | (United States) US Air Force | |
| 13 November; 23:00 | | AFCRL | Suborbital | Aeronomy | 13 November | Successful |
| 13 November; 23:00 | Apogee: 262 kilometres (163 mi) | | | | | |
| 14 November; 14:30 | (United States) MGM-31 Pershing I | | (United States) Fort Wingate | | (United States) US Army | |
| 14 November; 14:30 | | US Army | Suborbital | Missile test | 14 November | Successful |
| 14 November; 14:30 | Apogee: 250 kilometres (160 mi) | | | | | |
| 14 November; 14:58 | (United States) Nike-Cajun | | (United States) Kwajalein | | (United States) US Navy | |
| 14 November; 14:58 | | Michigan | Suborbital | Aeronomy | 14 November | Successful |
| 14 November; 14:58 | Apogee: 127 kilometres (79 mi) | | | | | |
| 14 November | (United States) Nike-Zeus 3 | | (United States) Kwajalein | | (United States) US Army | |
| 14 November | | US Army | Suborbital | ABM test | 14 November | Successful |
| 14 November | Apogee: 200 kilometres (120 mi) | | | | | |
| 14 November | (United States) HGM-25A Titan I | | (United States) Vandenberg LC-395A-1 | | (United States) Strategic Air Command | |
| 14 November | | Strategic Air Command | Suborbital | Missile test | 14 November | Successful |
| 14 November | Apogee: 1,000 kilometres (620 mi) | | | | | |
| 16 November; 16:54:42 | (United States) UGM-27 Polaris A2 | | (United States) USS Andrew Jackson, ETR | | (United States) US Navy | |
| 16 November; 16:54:42 | | US Navy | Suborbital | Missile test | 16 November | Successful |
| 16 November; 16:54:42 | Apogee: 1,000 kilometres (620 mi) | | | | | |
| 16 November | (Soviet Union) R-12 Dvina | | (Soviet Union) Plesetsk | | (Soviet Union) MVS | |
| 16 November | | MVS | Suborbital | Missile test | 16 November | Successful |
| 16 November | Apogee: 402 kilometres (250 mi) | | | | | |
| 17 November; 18:15 | (United States) Aerobee-150A | | (United States) Wallops Island | | (United States) NASA | |
| 17 November; 18:15 | | NASA | Suborbital | Aeronomy | 17 November | Successful |
| 17 November; 18:15 | Apogee: 370 kilometres (230 mi) | | | | | |
| 18 November | (United States) Honest John-Nike-Nike | | (United States) Point Arguello LC-A | | (United States) NASA | |
| 18 November | | NASA | Suborbital | Test flight | 18 November | Successful |
| 18 November | Apogee: 163 kilometres (101 mi) | | | | | |
| 19 November; 00:05 | (United Kingdom) Skylark-7C | | (Australia) Woomera LA-2 | | (United Kingdom) RAE | |
| 19 November; 00:05 | | Birmingham; UCW; UCL | Suborbital | Ionospheric; Solar | 19 November | Launch failure |
| 19 November | (Soviet Union) R-14 Chusovaya | | (Soviet Union) Plesetsk | | (Soviet Union) RVSN | |
| 19 November | | RVSN | Suborbital | Missile test | 19 November | Launch failure |
| 20 November; 17:31 | (United States) MGM-31 Pershing I | | (United States) Fort Wingate | | (United States) US Army | |
| 20 November; 17:31 | | US Army | Suborbital | Missile test | 20 November | Successful |
| 20 November; 17:31 | Apogee: 250 kilometres (160 mi) | | | | | |
| 21 November; 12:55 | (United States) Nike-Apache | | (India) Thumba | | (United States) NASA | |
| 21 November; 12:55 | | NASA | Suborbital | Aeronomy | 21 November | Successful |
| 21 November; 12:55 | Apogee: 208 kilometres (129 mi). First suborbital rocket launch from India. | | | | | |
| 21 November | (United States) Nike-Tomahawk 9A | | (United States) Barking Sands | | (United States) Sandia | |
| 21 November | | Sandia | Suborbital | Test flight | 21 November | Successful |
| 21 November | Apogee: 292 kilometres (181 mi) | | | | | |
| 22 November; 21:00 | (United States) Nike-Tomahawk 9A | | (United States) Barking Sands | | (United States) Sandia | |
| 22 November; 21:00 | | Sandia | Suborbital | Test flight | 22 November | Successful |
| 22 November; 21:00 | Apogee: 292 kilometres (181 mi) | | | | | |
| 22 November | (Soviet Union) R-16U | | (Soviet Union) Baikonur Site 41/3 | | (Soviet Union) RVSN | |
| 22 November | | RVSN | Suborbital | Missile test | 22 November | Successful |
| 22 November | Apogee: 1,210 kilometres (750 mi) | | | | | |
| 23 November | (Soviet Union) R-12 Dvina | | (Soviet Union) Plesetsk | | (Soviet Union) MVS | |
| 23 November | | MVS | Suborbital | Missile test | 23 November | Successful |
| 23 November | Apogee: 402 kilometres (250 mi) | | | | | |
| 23 November | (Soviet Union) R-16U | | (Soviet Union) Baikonur Site 41/4 | | (Soviet Union) RVSN | |
| 23 November | | RVSN | Suborbital | Missile test | 23 November | Successful |
| 23 November | Apogee: 1,210 kilometres (750 mi) | | | | | |
| 26 November; 18:16 | (United States) Nike-Apache | | (United States) Wallops Island | | (United States) NASA | |
| 26 November; 18:16 | | Michigan | Suborbital | Aeronomy | 26 November | Successful |
| 26 November; 18:16 | Apogee: 172 kilometres (107 mi) | | | | | |
| 26 November; 18:44 | (United States) Nike-Cajun | | (United States) Wallops Island | | (United States) NASA | |
| 26 November; 18:44 | | Michigan | Suborbital | Aeronomy | 26 November | Successful |
| 26 November; 18:44 | Apogee: 151 kilometres (94 mi) | | | | | |
| 27 November; 06:10:59 | (United States) UGM-27 Polaris A3 | | (United States) USNS Observation Island, ETR | | (United States) US Navy | |
| 27 November; 06:10:59 | | US Navy | Suborbital | Missile test | 27 November | Successful |
| 27 November; 06:10:59 | Apogee: 1,000 kilometres (620 mi) | | | | | |
| 27 November; 17:50 | (United States) Aerobee-150 (Hi) | | (United States) White Sands LC-35 | | (United States) NRL | |
| 27 November; 17:50 | | NRL | Suborbital | Solar | 27 November | Successful |
| 27 November; 17:50 | Apogee: 216 kilometres (134 mi) | | | | | |
| 27 November | (United States) LGM-30B Minuteman IB | | (United States) Vandenberg LC-394A-6 | | (United States) Strategic Air Command | |
| 27 November | | Strategic Air Command | Suborbital | Missile test | 27 November | Successful |
| 27 November | Apogee: 1,300 kilometres (810 mi) | | | | | |
| 27 November | (Soviet Union) R-12 Dvina | | (Soviet Union) Plesetsk | | (Soviet Union) MVS | |
| 27 November | | MVS | Suborbital | Missile test | 27 November | Successful |
| 27 November | Apogee: 402 kilometres (250 mi) | | | | | |
| 28 November | | | (Soviet Union) Plesetsk | | (Soviet Union) MVS | |
| 28 November | | MVS | Suborbital | Missile test | 28 November | Successful |
| 28 November | Apogee: 200 kilometres (120 mi) | | | | | |
| 28 November | | | (Soviet Union) Plesetsk | | (Soviet Union) MVS | |
| 28 November | | MVS | Suborbital | Missile test | 28 November | Successful |
| 28 November | Apogee: 200 kilometres (120 mi) | | | | | |
| 29 November | (United States) LGM-30A Minuteman IA | | (United States) Vandenberg LC-394A-5 | | (United States) Strategic Air Command | |
| 29 November | | Strategic Air Command | Suborbital | Missile test | 29 November | Successful |
| 29 November | Apogee: 1,300 kilometres (810 mi) | | | | | |
| 29 November | (Soviet Union) R-12 Dvina | | (Soviet Union) Plesetsk | | (Soviet Union) MVS | |
| 29 November | | MVS | Suborbital | Missile test | 29 November | Successful |
| 29 November | Apogee: 402 kilometres (250 mi) | | | | | |
| 2 December; 04:15 | (United Kingdom) Skylark-7C | | (Australia) Woomera LA-2 | | (United Kingdom) RAE | |
| 2 December; 04:15 | | RAE | Suborbital | Test flight | 2 December | Successful |
| 2 December; 04:15 | Apogee: 168 kilometres (104 mi) | | | | | |
| 3 December; 04:59 | (United Kingdom) Skylark-7C | | (Australia) Woomera LA-2 | | (United Kingdom) RAE | |
| 3 December; 04:59 | | Birmingham; UCW; UCL | Suborbital | Ionospheric; Solar | 3 December | Launch failure |
| 3 December; 04:59 | Apogee: 106 kilometres (66 mi) | | | | | |
| 3 December; 08:00:29 | (Soviet Union) R-36 | | (Soviet Union) Baikonur Site 67/21 | | (Soviet Union) RVSN | |
| 3 December; 08:00:29 | | RVSN | Suborbital | Missile test | 3 December | Successful |
| 3 December; 08:00:29 | Apogee: 903 kilometres (561 mi) | | | | | |
| 3 December | (Soviet Union) R-12 Dvina | | (Soviet Union) Plesetsk | | (Soviet Union) MVS | |
| 3 December | | MVS | Suborbital | Missile test | 3 December | Successful |
| 3 December | Apogee: 402 kilometres (250 mi) | | | | | |
| 3 December | (Soviet Union) R-12 Dvina | | (Soviet Union) Plesetsk | | (Soviet Union) MVS | |
| 3 December | | MVS | Suborbital | Missile test | 3 December | Successful |
| 3 December | Apogee: 402 kilometres (250 mi) | | | | | |
| 4 December | (Soviet Union) R-9 Desna | | (Soviet Union) Baikonur | | (Soviet Union) RVSN | |
| 4 December | | RVSN | Suborbital | Missile test | 4 December | Launch failure |
| 4 December | (Soviet Union) R-12 Dvina | | (Soviet Union) Plesetsk | | (Soviet Union) MVS | |
| 4 December | | MVS | Suborbital | Missile test | 4 December | Successful |
| 4 December | Apogee: 402 kilometres (250 mi) | | | | | |
| 5 December | (United States) Aerobee-150 (Hi) | | (United States) White Sands LC-35 | | (United States) US Air Force | |
| 5 December | | US Air Force | Suborbital | Solar | 5 December | Successful |
| 5 December | Apogee: 200 kilometres (120 mi) | | | | | |
| 5 December | (United States) MGM-31 Pershing I | | (United States) Fort Wingate | | (United States) US Army | |
| 5 December | | US Army | Suborbital | Missile test | 5 December | Successful |
| 5 December | Apogee: 250 kilometres (160 mi) | | | | | |
| 7 December; 13:11 | (United States) Nike-Cajun | | (United States) Wallops Island | | (United States) NASA | |
| 7 December; 13:11 | | NASA | Suborbital | Aeronomy | 7 December | Successful |
| 7 December; 13:11 | Apogee: 103 kilometres (64 mi) | | | | | |
| 7 December; 13:43:00 | (United States) Nike-Apache | | (United States) Wallops Island | | (United States) NASA | |
| 7 December; 13:43:00 | | Michigan | Suborbital | Aeronomy | 7 December | Successful |
| 7 December; 13:43:00 | Apogee: 141 kilometres (88 mi) | | | | | |
| 8 December | (Soviet Union) R-9 Desna | | (Soviet Union) Baikonur | | (Soviet Union) RVSN | |
| 8 December | | RVSN | Suborbital | Missile test | 8 December | Launch failure |
| 9 December; 05:24 | (United States) Astrobee-200 | | (Canada) Churchill | | (United States) US Air Force | |
| 9 December; 05:24 | | US Air Force | Suborbital | Aeronomy; Auroral | 9 December | Launch failure |
| 9 December; 05:24 | Apogee: 242 kilometres (150 mi) | | | | | |
| 9 December | (Soviet Union) R-14 Chusovaya | | (Soviet Union) Plesetsk | | (Soviet Union) RVSN | |
| 9 December | | RVSN | Suborbital | Missile test | 9 December | Successful |
| 9 December | Apogee: 675 kilometres (419 mi) | | | | | |
| 10 December; 03:11:17 | (United States) UGM-27 Polaris A3 | | (United States) Cape Canaveral LC-25A | | (United States) US Navy | |
| 10 December; 03:11:17 | | US Navy | Suborbital | Missile test | 10 December | Successful |
| 10 December; 03:11:17 | Apogee: 1,000 kilometres (620 mi) | | | | | |
| 10 December | (Soviet Union) R-12 Dvina | | (Soviet Union) Plesetsk | | (Soviet Union) MVS | |
| 10 December | | MVS | Suborbital | Missile test | 10 December | Successful |
| 10 December | Apogee: 402 kilometres (250 mi) | | | | | |
| 11 December; 01:00:06 | (United States) UGM-27 Polaris A3 | | (United States) USNS Observation Island, ETR | | (United States) US Navy | |
| 11 December; 01:00:06 | | US Navy | Suborbital | Missile test | 11 December | Launch failure |
| 11 December; 01:00:06 | Apogee: 1 kilometre (0.62 mi) | | | | | |
| 11 December; 05:00 | (Japan) Lambda 2 | | (Japan) Kagoshima LA-L | | (Japan) ISAS | |
| 11 December; 05:00 | | Tokyo; Kyoto | Suborbital | Ionospheric | 11 December | Successful |
| 11 December; 05:00 | Apogee: 410 kilometres (250 mi) | | | | | |
| 11 December | (United States) Nike-Zeus 3 | | (United States) White Sands LC-38 | | (United States) US Army | |
| 11 December | | US Army | Suborbital | Missile test | 11 December | Successful |
| 11 December | Apogee: 200 kilometres (120 mi) | | | | | |
| 12 December; 08:50 | (Japan) Kappa-8L | | (Japan) Kagoshima | | (Japan) ISAS | |
| 12 December; 08:50 | | ISAS | Suborbital | Aeronomy; Fields | 12 December | Successful |
| 12 December; 08:50 | Apogee: 103 kilometres (64 mi) | | | | | |
| 12 December; 16:50 | (United States) Aerobee-150 (Hi) | | (United States) White Sands LC-35 | | (United States) US Air Force | |
| 12 December; 16:50 | | US Air Force | Suborbital | Solar | 12 December | Successful |
| 12 December; 16:50 | Apogee: 325 kilometres (202 mi) | | | | | |
| 12 December; 19:06 | (Australia) HAD | | (Australia) Woomera LA-2 | | (Australia) WRE | |
| 12 December; 19:06 | | WRE | Suborbital | Aeronomy | 12 December | Successful |
| 12 December; 19:06 | Apogee: 100 kilometres (62 mi) | | | | | |
| 12 December; 20:00:01 | (United States) LGM-25C Titan II | | (United States) Cape Canaveral LC-15 | | (United States) US Air Force | |
| 12 December; 20:00:01 | | AFCRL | Suborbital | Test flight | 12 December | Successful |
| 12 December; 20:00:01 | Apogee: 1,300 kilometres (810 mi) | | | | | |
| 12 December | (Soviet Union) R-12 Dvina | | (Soviet Union) Plesetsk | | (Soviet Union) MVS | |
| 12 December | | MVS | Suborbital | Missile test | 12 December | Launch failure |
| 12 December | (Soviet Union) R-16U | | (Soviet Union) Baikonur Site 41/3 | | (Soviet Union) RVSN | |
| 12 December | | RVSN | Suborbital | Missile test | 12 December | Successful |
| 12 December | Apogee: 1,210 kilometres (750 mi) | | | | | |
| 13 December; 22:32 | (United States) Nike-Apache | | (United States) White Sands | | (United States) NASA | |
| 13 December; 22:32 | | NASA | Suborbital | Solar; Ionospheric | 13 December | Launch failure |
| 13 December; 22:32 | Apogee: 73 kilometres (45 mi) | | | | | |
| 13 December | (Soviet Union) R-36 | | (Soviet Union) Baikonur Site 67/21 | | (Soviet Union) RVSN | |
| 13 December | | RVSN | Suborbital | Missile test | 13 December | Launch failure |
| 13 December | (United States) LGM-30B Minuteman IB | | (United States) Vandenberg LC-394A-1 | | (United States) Strategic Air Command | |
| 13 December | | Strategic Air Command | Suborbital | Missile test | 13 December | Successful |
| 13 December | Apogee: 1,300 kilometres (810 mi) | | | | | |
| 13 December | (United States) LGM-30A Minuteman IA | | (United States) Vandenberg LC-394A-3 | | (United States) Strategic Air Command | |
| 13 December | | Strategic Air Command | Suborbital | Missile test | 13 December | Successful |
| 13 December | Apogee: 1,300 kilometres (810 mi) | | | | | |
| 17 December; 17:17:34 | (United States) Blue Scout Junior SLV-1C | | (United States) Vandenberg LC-4300C | | (United States) US Air Force | |
| 17 December; 17:17:34 | | Strategic Air Command | Suborbital | Communications | 17 December | Successful |
| 17 December; 17:17:34 | Apogee: 1,000 kilometres (620 mi) | | | | | |
| 17 December | (United States) LGM-25C Titan II | | (United States) Vandenberg LC-395D | | (United States) US Air Force | |
| 17 December | | AFCRL | Suborbital | Test flight | 17 December | Successful |
| 17 December | Apogee: 1,300 kilometres (810 mi) | | | | | |
| 17 December | (Soviet Union) R-12 Dvina | | (Soviet Union) Plesetsk | | (Soviet Union) MVS | |
| 17 December | | MVS | Suborbital | Missile test | 17 December | Successful |
| 17 December | Apogee: 402 kilometres (250 mi) | | | | | |
| 18 December; 03:00 | (United States) LGM-30B Minuteman IB | | (United States) Cape Canaveral LC-32B | | (United States) US Air Force | |
| 18 December; 03:00 | | US Air Force | Suborbital | Missile test | 18 December | Successful |
| 18 December; 03:00 | Apogee: 1,300 kilometres (810 mi) | | | | | |
| 18 December; 09:52:27 | (United States) SM-65D Atlas | | (United States) Vandenberg LC-576A-1 | | (United States) Strategic Air Command | |
| 18 December; 09:52:27 | | Strategic Air Command | Suborbital | REV Test | 18 December | Successful |
| 18 December; 09:52:27 | Apogee: 1,800 kilometres (1,100 mi) | | | | | |
| 18 December; 22:56:22 | (United States) SM-65F Atlas | | (United States) Vandenberg LC-576G | | (United States) US Air Force | |
| 18 December; 22:56:22 | | US Air Force | Suborbital | Missile test | 18 December | Successful |
| 18 December; 22:56:22 | Apogee: 1,400 kilometres (870 mi) | | | | | |
| 18 December | (United States) Nike-Cajun | | (United States) Kwajalein | | (United States) US Navy | |
| 18 December | | Michigan | Suborbital | Aeronomy | 18 December | Successful |
| 18 December | Apogee: 100 kilometres (62 mi) | | | | | |
| 18 December | (United States) Nike-Cajun | | (United States) Kwajalein | | (United States) US Navy | |
| 18 December | | Michigan | Suborbital | Aeronomy | 18 December | Successful |
| 18 December | Apogee: 100 kilometres (62 mi) | | | | | |
| 20 December | (United States) LGM-30A Minuteman IA | | (United States) Vandenberg LC-394A-5 | | (United States) Strategic Air Command | |
| 20 December | | Strategic Air Command | Suborbital | Missile test | 20 December | Successful |
| 20 December | Apogee: 1,300 kilometres (810 mi) | | | | | |
| 20 December | (Soviet Union) R-16U | | (Soviet Union) Baikonur Site 41/3 | | (Soviet Union) RVSN | |
| 20 December | | RVSN | Suborbital | Missile test | 20 December | Successful |
| 20 December | Apogee: 1,210 kilometres (750 mi) | | | | | |
| 21 December | (Soviet Union) R-9 Desna | | (Soviet Union) Baikonur | | (Soviet Union) RVSN | |
| 21 December | | RVSN | Suborbital | Missile test | 21 December | Successful |
| 21 December | Apogee: 1,160 kilometres (720 mi) | | | | | |
| 24 December | (Soviet Union) R-5B Pobeda | | (Soviet Union) Plesetsk | | (Soviet Union) AN | |
| 24 December | | AN | Suborbital | Aeronomy | 24 December | Successful |
| 24 December | Apogee: 500 kilometres (310 mi) | | | | | |
| 25 December | (Soviet Union) R-9 Desna | | (Soviet Union) Baikonur | | (Soviet Union) RVSN | |
| 25 December | | RVSN | Suborbital | Missile test | 25 December | Successful |
| 25 December | Apogee: 1,160 kilometres (720 mi) | | | | | |
| 29 December | | | (Soviet Union) Plesetsk | | (Soviet Union) MVS | |
| 29 December | | MVS | Suborbital | Missile test | 29 December | Successful |
| 29 December | Apogee: 200 kilometres (120 mi) | | | | | |
| 30 December | (Soviet Union) R-14 Chusovaya | | (Soviet Union) Plesetsk | | (Soviet Union) RVSN | |
| 30 December | | RVSN | Suborbital | Missile test | 30 December | Successful |
| 30 December | Apogee: 675 kilometres (419 mi) | | | | | |
| December | (United States) Nike-Apache | | (United States) White Sands | | (United States) US Army | |
| December | | US Army | Suborbital | Target | December | Successful |
| December | Apogee: 100 kilometres (62 mi) | | | | | |
| December | (China) T-7A | | (China) Shijiedu | | (China) SIED | |
| December | | SIED | Suborbital | Test flight | December | Successful |
| December | Apogee: 115 kilometres (71 mi) | | | | | |
| Unknown | (Soviet Union) A-350Zh | | (Soviet Union) Sary Shagan LC-6 | | (Soviet Union) PRO | |
| Unknown | | PRO | Suborbital | Missile test | Unknown | Successful |
| Unknown | Apogee: 100 kilometres (62 mi) | | | | | |
| Unknown | (Soviet Union) R-21 | | Project 658 Submarine, | | (Soviet Union) RVSN | |
| Unknown | | RVSN | Suborbital | Missile test | Unknown | Successful |
| Unknown | Apogee: 293 kilometres (182 mi) | | | | | |
| Unknown | (Soviet Union) R-9 Desna | | (Soviet Union) Baikonur | | (Soviet Union) RVSN | |
| Unknown | | RVSN | Suborbital | Missile test | Unknown | Successful |
| Unknown | Apogee: 1,160 kilometres (720 mi) | | | | | |
| Unknown | (United States) Trailblazer-2M | | (United States) Wallops Island | | (United States) NASA | |
| Unknown | | NASA | Suborbital | REV Test | Unknown | Successful |
| Unknown | Apogee: 300 kilometres (190 mi) | | | | | |
