= Black Mesa Test Range =

US rocket testing facility, 1963–1971

Coordinates: 37°22′N 109°17′W

Black Mesa was a rocket testing facility of the US Army in Utah. Many rockets of the Pershing type have been launched for testing from Black Mesa between 1963 and 1971. It was located in what is now the Utah Test and Training Range (UTTR) which was taken over by the Air Force Systems Command in 1979.
