= Hopi-Dart =

American sounding rocket in service from 1963 to 1964

- Function: Sounding rocket
- Manufacturer: Marshall Space Flight Center
- Country of origin: United States

Size
- Height: 3.32 m (10.9 ft)
- Diameter: 0.11 m (4.3 in)
- Mass: 38 kg (84 lb)
- Stages: Two

Payload to 97 km (60 mi)
- Mass: 4.99 kg (11.0 lb)

Launch history
- Status: Retired
- Launch sites: Multiple
- Total launches: 22
- First flight: 28 February 1963
- Last flight: 23 November 1964

First stage – Hopi III
- Diameter: 0.11 m (4.3 in)
- Propellant: solid

Second stage – Dart
- Diameter: 3.5 cm (1.4 in)

Hopi-Dart was an American sounding rocket used by the NASA Marshall Space Flight Center for aeronomy studies in the early 1960s.

== Design ==
Hopi-Dart was a two-stage vehicle, combining a solid-fuelled Hopi III first stage with an unpowered Dart second stage. It was originally capable of carrying a payload of 4.5 kilograms (10 lb) to an apogee of 64 kilometres (40 mi); an upgrade, sometimes known as "Hopi Plus", increased the apogee to 97 km (60 mi). The Hopi-Dart was developed for NASA Marshall Space Fight Center to obtain wind speeds at altitudes from 70 to 90 kilometers in support of Saturn launches. Design was headed by Charles W. Watson.

== Operational history ==
Eleven test and eleven operational aeronomy missions were flown, with Wallops Island, the Tonopah Test Range, and the Cape Canaveral Air Force Station Launch Complex 43 being used as launch sites. Four of the test launches were failures. After flight 18 significant modifications were made. The modifications were to the interstage, propellant formulation, and the rocket nozzle. The redesigned first stage was renamed the Hopi III. Hopi III-Dart was replaced by the Super Loki-Dart of Space Data Corporation.
