= 1962 in spaceflight =

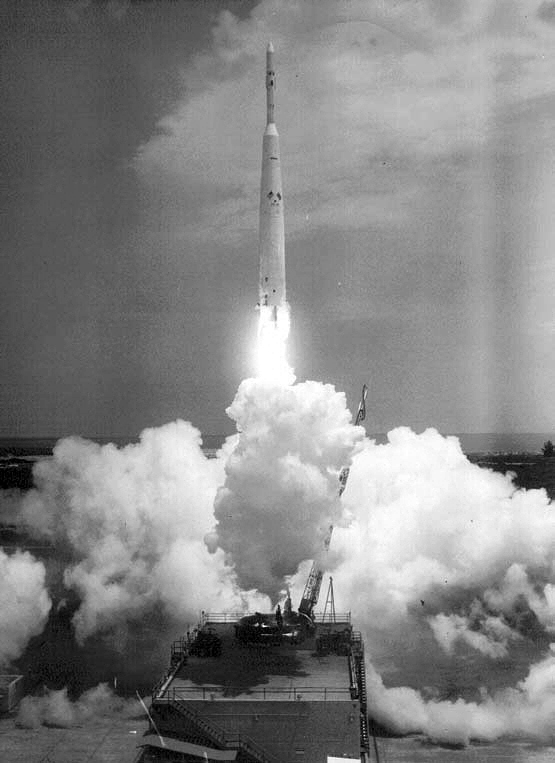
- The launch of Ariel 1, the first satellite not to be operated by the Soviet Union or United States

Orbital launches
- First: 13 January
- Last: 22 December
- Total: 81
- Successes: 65
- Failures: 15
- Partial failures: 1
- Catalogued: 72

National firsts
- Spaceflight: Turkey; Norway; Lebanon; Pakistan
- Satellite: United Kingdom; Canada

Rockets
- Maiden flights: Delta A Delta B Scout X-2; Scout X-2M; Scout X-3; Thor DM-21 Agena-D; Vostok-2
- Retirements: Delta A Scout X-2; Thor DM-19 Delta; Thor DM-21 Ablestar

Crewed flights
- Orbital: 5
- Total travellers: 5

== Deep space rendezvous ==
Date (GMT)	Spacecraft	Event	Remarks
28 January	Ranger 3	Flyby of the Moon	Failed impactor, closest approach: 36,793 kilometres (22,862 mi)
26 April	Ranger 4	Lunar impact	Impacted far side, no data returned
21 October	Ranger 5	Flyby of the Moon	Failed impactor, closest approach: 724 kilometres (450 mi)
14 December	Mariner 2	Flyby of Venus	Closest approach: 34,773 kilometres (21,607 mi)

== Orbital launch statistics ==
=== By country ===
Country	Launches	Successes	Failures	Partial failures
Soviet Union	22	15	7	0
United States	59	50	8	1
World	81	65	15	1

=== By rocket ===
Rocket	Country	Launches	Successes	Failures	Partial failures	Remarks
Atlas LV-3A Agena-B	United States	13	10	3	0	
Atlas LV-3B	United States	3	3	0	0	
Delta A	United States	2	2	0	0	Only flights
Delta B	United States	1	1	0	0	Maiden flight
Kosmos-2I 63S1	Soviet Union	8	7	1	0	
Molniya 8K78	Soviet Union	6	1	5	0	
Scout X-2	United States	1	0	1	0	Only flights
Scout X-2M	United States	2	1	1	0	Maiden flight
Scout X-3	United States	2	2	0	0	Maiden flight
Thor DM-21 Ablestar	United States	3	1	2	0	Retired
Thor DM-21 Agena-B	United States	18	16	1	1	
Thor DM-21 Agena-D	United States	8	8	0	0	Maiden flight
Thor DM-19 Delta	United States	6	6	0	0	Retired
Vostok-K 8K72K	Soviet Union	3	3	0	0	
Vostok-2 8A92	Soviet Union	5	4	1	0	Maiden flight

=== By orbit ===
Orbital regime	Launches	Successes	Failures	Accidentally Achieved	Remarks
Low Earth	62	55	7	5	
Medium Earth	7	6	1	0	
High Earth	1	1	0	0	Including Highly elliptical orbits
Heliocentric	11	5	6	0	
