= Neuenwalde Convent =

Lutheran convent in Lower Saxony, Germany

- Kloster Neuenwalde
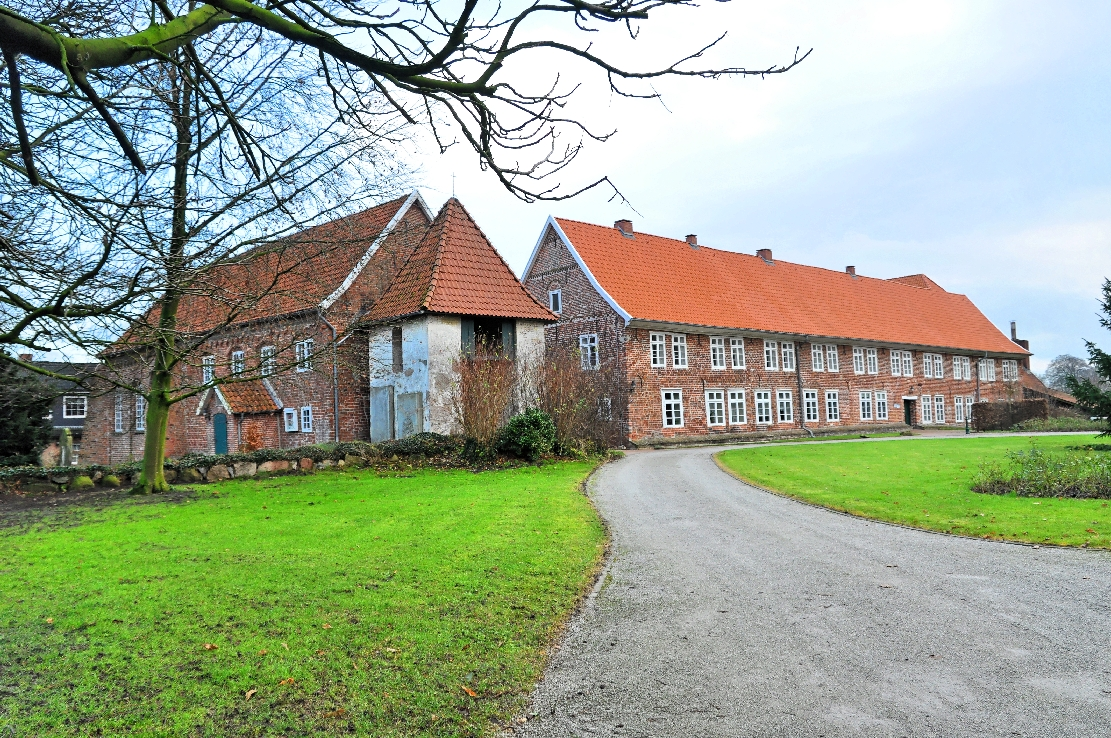
- Holy Cross Church (left) and the convent building Altes Kloster (right)

- Location of the convent within Lower Saxony

Monastery information
- Other names: Conventus Sanct(a)e Crucis (Latin); Klooster Niewohl (Low German); Kloster Neuenwalde (German)
- Order: Benedictine (as of 1282); Lutheran damsels' convent (as of 1584)
- Established: 1219
- Disestablished: 1630, 1648, and again 1811
- Reestablished: 1634; 1684, and again 1816
- Dedication: Holy Cross (and St. Mary), earlier only St. Mary; additionally Mary Magdalene since the sixteenth century.
- Diocese: Archdiocese of Bremen
- Controlled churches: Holy Cross Church

People
- Founder: Lords of Diepholz
- Prior: Veronika von der Decken

Architecture
- Functional status: active
- Style: early Gothic
- Groundbreaking: 1330s
- Completed date: 1330

Site
- Location: Neuenwalde
- Coordinates: 53°40′33″N 8°41′30″E
- Visible remains: Altes Kloster, the western wing of the cloister, Holy Cross Church
- Public access: yes
- Website: www.kloster-neuenwalde.de (in German)

The Neuenwalde Convent (N. Low Saxon: Klooster Niewohl, German: Kloster Neuenwalde; Latin: Conventus Sanct[a]e Crucis) is a Lutheran damsels' convent in Neuenwalde, a locality of Geestland, Lower Saxony, Germany.

Since 1683 the convent is owned by the corporation of the Bremian Knighthood and used for Lutheran conventuals and continues to function as such today. It is the only convent preserved in the Elbe-Weser triangle out of a former sample of 14 monasteries. The convent was established as a Roman Catholic nunnery in 1219, and was recorded in 1282 for pursuing the Benedictine observance. The convent relocated twice in 1282 and 1334.

== Tasks and work ==
According to the Klosterordnung (monastic statute) of 1684, at times altered and amended, at last in 2004, the convent is owned by the Bremian Knighthood. The Bremian Knighthood, established by 1300, was formerly the estate of the noble families within the Bremian prince-archbishopric and later the Duchy of Bremen. Its 20 members today are the proprietors of the landed estates registered in 1577 as knightly allods.

The Knighthood committed itself, within the limits of its financial resources, to provide for the funds necessary to fulfill the tasks of the convent. The convent is directed by the president of the Knighthood. The president is the legal representative of the convent, unless he entrusts competences to the prioress.

The convent preserves venerable, historical traditions, therefore it serves exclusively and immediately charitable, ecclesiastical and cultural purposes, such as

(a) combining celibate Protestant women within the convent to form a community on a Christian basis, in order to let them serve cultural, ecclesiastical and charitable purposes for the general good
(b) stewarding and maintaining the listed protected convent buildings, the convent church as well as the cloister garden, to keep the compound accessible for the general public, in as far as this is compatible with the other tasks of the convent
(c) acting as a spiritual and cultural centre for the region.

Women applying for the conventual community should be physically and mentally healthy and able to make their living and to keep their household independently, as well as capable of contributing to the convent life. Each conventual, as the inhabitants are termed, has an apartment of her own. Applicants should not be older than 70 years.

Before being permanently admitted as a conventual applicant and president will stipulate a three-months novitiate. Since 2004 admittance is not restricted to women of noble descent any more. Unlike stipulated in the earlier version of the statute, today nobody is entitled to be admitted into the convent. Thus the former privilege of the 20 families, forming the membership of the Knighthood, to nominate female relatives for vacancies in the convent does not apply any more. Since May 2005 there are again several conventuals forming the community. In 2014 they were four.

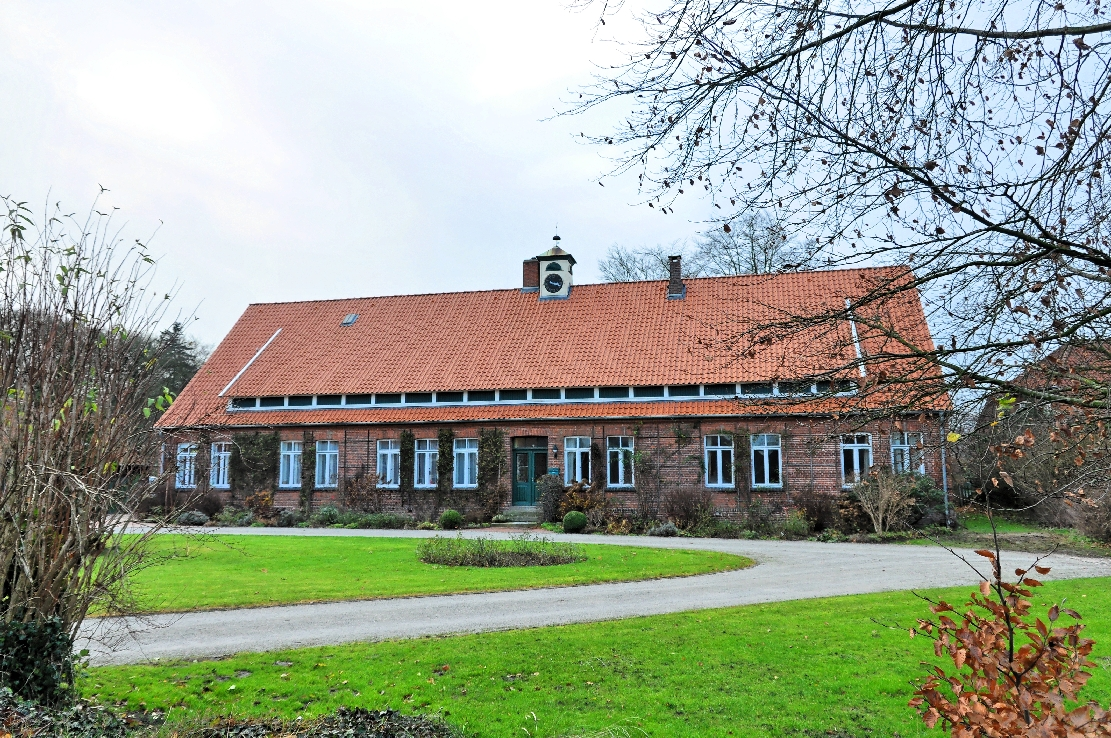
Convent: Tithe Barn (Zehntscheune), 2012

The president of the Knighthood appoints a prioress for a five-year term, which may be extended several times until the prioress reaches the age of 75. Currently Veronika von der Decken functions as the prioress.

In order to broaden its cultural and spiritual activities the convent started in 2012 a coöperation with the Evangelisches Bildungszentrum Bad Bederkesa (Protestant Centre for Education at Bad Bederkesa). According to its president, Eduard von Reden-Lütcken, the Knighthood modernised and adjusted convent premises for about €1 million. Seminar rooms and 13 little apartments were installed, also offering guests a retreat. In the Zehntscheune (i.e. tithe barn) a modern canteen kitchen and a refectory were added.

== History ==
=== In Midlum from 1219 to 1282 ===
The oldest known deed on the convent records for 1219 that six members of the family of the Lords of Diepholz, owning estates in and near Midlum, founded the nunnery and endowed them to it. The Diepholz Lords then owned the Hollburg Castle between Holßel and Midlum on the brink of the Wesermünde Geest ridge, allowing a good view over the lower Land of Wursten, then a corporation of free Frisian peasants under only loose overlordship of the Prince-Archbishopric of Bremen. Rather than establishing the nunnery as their proprietary monastery the Diepholz family made it over to the cathedral chapter of the Bremen archdiocese. However, the Diepholz family adopted the advocacy (Vogtei) over the nunnery, later passed on to the Knights of Bederkesa who were related by marriage.

The foundation of the nunnery by six sons of William I, Lord of Diepholz and the disgraced Gottschalk I, Lord of Diepholz, one of the first rulers of the Diepholz Lordship, aiming for their readmittance as a princely ruling family, is therefore also seen as an act of atonement with Emperor Frederick I Barbarossa, against whom his cousin Henry the Lion had rebelled. Gottschalk I, recorded since 1177, and a loyal vassal of the defeated Henry, is said to have had joined him into his exile with the English king in 1182.

In 1227 Prince-Archbishop Gebhard of Lippe confirmed and thus recognised the foundation of the convent. The nuns had the privilege to freely elect their provost, their legal warden. The Midlum St. Pancras Church, which existed before, was integrated into the convent. No remains of cloister or conventual outbuildings remain, and there are only few documentary references to them.

In 1232 Emperor Frederick II issued a writ of protection in favour of the convent and thus confirmed and acknowledged the foundation, denoting it a Cistercian nunnery. This was maybe because Gebhard of Lippe preferred the Cistercians. Hermann Hoogeweg holds that the nuns were Premonstratensians. The convent's actual original affiliation to a monastic order is not documented. No hint is recorded that the convent strove to be incorporated into the Cistercian Order.

It is also possible that the convent followed Cistercian customs without formal incorporation. The convent started the typical Cistercian practice to build up a large autark integrated production (Eigenwirtschaft). Unlike unsettled and undeveloped areas where Cistercians usually founded new monasteries the farmlands donated to the convent were held by feudal tenants and sparsed in and around Midlum. The convent cleared its feudal farmlands from the unfree peasants tilling them (cf. Lowland Clearances) transforming them into dependent agrarian workers or cotters (smallholders who need additional work) and (most of) their fields into the convent's demesne. This transformation posed an immediate hardship for feudal tenants on the geest in and around Midlum.

On outlying estates the convent founded its Vorwerk of Kransburg which today forms a locality of Midlum. All over the parish of Midlum, e.g. in Sorthum, Northum, Wenckebüttel and Esigstedt, the convent acquired the overlordship to farmlands from those lords who held it before, in order to round off its demesne. The convent cleared the latter two villages from peasants which were thus abandoned.

Along the low side of the Wesermünde Geest ridge towards the marshy Land of Wursten there is a narrow swampy strip of wasteland called the Wursten Sietland. While the Wursten Frisians claimed the Sietland as their commons, the convent started to include it into its demesnes. In the valley cuts of the geest between Holßel and Nordholz the convent impounded little becks in order to lay out stewponds for the fish as fasting dishes at lent.

The convent's demesne expansion meant the exclusive usage of geest forests, mires and heaths, previously also commonly used by the free Frisian peasants from the mostly treeless Land of Wursten in order to gain turf, firewood, timber and the fertilising plaggen. Thus the demesne expansion posed a massive threat for the material survival of the Wursten Frisians as free peasants. Without fuel, timber or fertiliser they could not help it but would sooner or later have to commendate themselves to feudal lords from the geest. The free Wursten Frisians disliked the noble establishment of a convent in their vicinity and treated the nuns with resentment.

In the same time knightly families from the geest aimed at subjecting the Wursten Frisians to their feudal overlordship in order to gain more from unpaid feudal labour and by compelling feudal dues and duties. The convent's desmesne but also manorial expansion just added up to these tensions. In the Wursten War (1256–1258) the Wursten Frisians repelled a knightly invasion to subject them to manorial (seigniorial) jurisdiction. The array of knights, among them members of the Diepholz and the Rahden families, then still landed in Rhade, was led by the Knight of Bederkesa. The defeated knights had to withdraw deep into the Bederkesa Bailiwick and exposed the boundary adjacent to the Land of Wursten, among others the Midlum parish.

After the victory the Land of Wursten occupied the Midlum parish. The unsettled geest strips within Midlum's municipal boundary are called Wursten Heath (Wurster Heide) since. However, the convent and the nuns were treated with great care not to deliver Prince-Archbishop Gebhard any pretext. The Wursten Frisians remembered the ordeal of the free Stedingen peasants in 1234, who refused to accept feudal overlordship too, but whom Gebhard had excommunicated and against whom he induced and fought a papally confirmed crusade, all after few Stedingers had slain an itinerant monk.

Under the rule of the consuls of the Land of Wursten the demesne expansion of the convent was successfully hindered. Soon the Midlum parish and its peasant population became integral parts of the Land of Wursten. The convent declined and blamed this to its location among the "perverse and bad people [the Wursten Frisians], striving for criminal and unallowed aims", as recorded in a convent deed. For them and Bremen's Prince-Archbishop Gilbert of Brunckhorst (ruling from 1273 to 1306) hindering the convent's demesne and manorial expansion could be nothing else but an unallowed aim. This finally led to the relocation of the convent out of Wursten Frisian control.

=== In Altenwalde from 1282 to 1334 ===
So 1282 the convent was moved to Wolde, present Altenwalde, since 1972 a part of Cuxhaven. Already in 1187 Prince-Archbishop Hartwig of Uthlede had acquired a site in Wolde with all pertinences for Mk. 160. The charter of transfer of January 1282 states that the nuns suffered from poverty and lived without a secure and regulated supervision in the midst of unruly peasants. In August that year Prince-Archbishop Gilbert placed the nuns in their new community, and on September 20 he consecrated convent church and cloister in Wolde, present Altenwalde. Already before the nuns' move there was the Holy Cross and St. Willehadus Chapel on the Mount (i.e. hill) in Wolde, owning a relic, a fragment of the Holy Cross of Jesus of Nazareth. The chapel had been placed under the convent's control. The relic attracted pilgrims to Wolde, whose expenses added up to the nunnery's revenues.

The corpse of Gottschalk I, Lord of Diepholz was translated from Midlum to Wolde too. After all, one purpose of the convent was that the nuns would pray for the salvation of the lords' soul. On the occasion of the move more noble families, such as the Lappes on Sahlenburg and Ritzebüttel, the Knights of Bederkesa, or the Dukes of Saxe-Lauenburg (as of 1307), added enfeoffments to the convent. By 1320 the Knights of Bederkesa started to sell of their stray landholdings to the convent.

In the new location the convent became a Benedictine nunnery. It was now subject to Prince-Archbishop Gilbert who also appointed the convent's provost, its legal warden and representative in the diets of the estates of the prince-archbishopric. Gilbert considered the convent his outpost to wield influence in the free peasant areas of the Lands of Hadeln and of Wursten as well as among separatist noble vassals such as the Lappes. Gilbert provided for the convent richly after its transfer to Wolde. On 17 April 1289 Gilbert assigned the tithe of Northum to the convent. The convent further acquired the villages Krempel and Da(h)lem.

In the course of the thirteenth century all farms of Holßel were subjected to the convent, as was the ius patronatus to Holßel's Church of St. James the Greater. The farmers in Arensch, Berensch, Gudendorf, Holte and Oxstedt, together termed as the heath villages (Heidedörfer), held the land they tilled in feudal tenancy (Meierverhältnis), subject to soccage and serjeanty for the convent. The convent subsequently cleared Holte from its feudally dependent peasants.

Even after the move the convent asserted most of its feudal possessions and privileges in the Midlum parish. In 1331 the commoner Gerhard de Merne (= Marren, Süder- and Nordermarren near Midlum) usurped the tithe from Esigstedt, protested by the convent, the enfranchised beneficiary, and left it again to the nuns only after the pastors of the Wursten parishes had intervened.

In 1332/1333 Provost Nicolaus commissioned the construction of a watermill on the Westerwedele (= western ford; present Neuenwalder Verbindungskanal) near the Wesermünde Geest ridge. Due to the lack of acreages and timber, as well as the insufficient water supply on the hill in Wolde the convent moved again only half a century later. The still hostile Wursten Frisians, looting pilgrims on their way to the Holy Cross relic, added up to the decision to move from Wolde.

=== In Neuenwalde since 1334 ===
On the vigil of the feast of Andrew the Apostle (29/30 November) 1334 Prince-Archbishop Burchard Grelle approved to move the convent again, this time into the undeveloped vicinity of its watermill. The new site, a sandy geest spit in the midst of mostly mires, was then named in N. Low Saxon Nig(h)enwolde (i.e. new Wolde; Germanised as Neuenwalde), whereas Wolde gradually adopted the naming Olenwoold (so in 1348, =old Wolde; Germanised as Altenwalde). In Neuenwalde the convent remained since.

With the relocation close to the watermill the convent started the colonisation of its new vicinity. By 1335 a settlement on the dam (causeway) towards the convent developed, forming a free dam adopting the modern Northern Low Saxon name Niewohl (Germanised as Neuenwalde). In the law system of the Bremen prince-archbishopric a free dam (Freier Damm) formed an immunity district (Freiheit) usually inhabited by mere cotters directly under the say of the local feudal lord, here the convent, exempt from sovereign archiepiscopal jurisdiction. Its settlers came, among other places, from Da(h)lem which itself turned into an abandoned village in today's Dahlemer Holz forest (near today's Flögeln), part of the convent's property.

Neuenwalde became a parish of its own and its precinct was redistricted from the St. Dionysius parish in Debstedt. The priest of Debstadt objected this reduction of his revenues, which is why Neuenwalde's provost paid Lübeck marks (M.lb.) 30 to that parish. Neuenwalde, like Debstedt, formed part of the Archdeaconry of Hadeln and Wursten, held in personal union by the dean of Bremen Cathedral.

On the occasion of the move the convent received the ius patronatus to the Altenwalde Ss. Cosmas and Damian Church from Hadeln's archdeacon who was compensated with the patronate to the St. Lawrence Church of Hasbergen in Oldenburg. The convent Church of the Holy Cross simultaneously served the Neuenwalders as parish church. The advowson was first with the provost and later with the prioress of the convent. After 1692 it was with Bremen-Verden's general government.

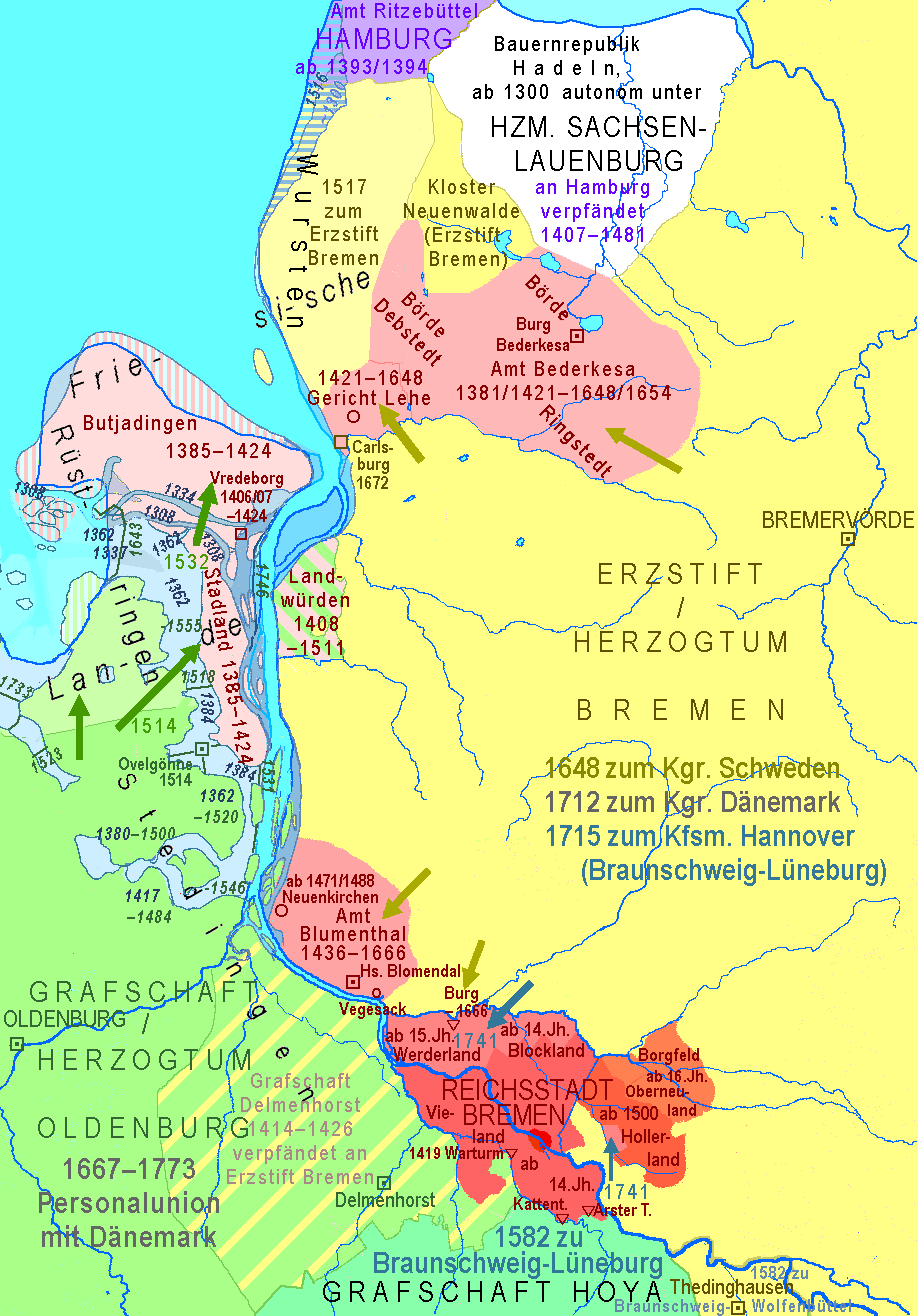
Lower Weser course: mid-top Hamburg's Ritzebüttel Bailiwick (purple), southeast thereof the Land of Hadeln (whitish), southwest thereof the Land of Wursten (light yellow), between them the wedge-formed Neuenwalde Bailiwick (rich yellow), southerly adjacent 3 city of Bremen possessions (rose), and east and south thereof the Bremen Prince-Archbishopric (later Duchy; yellow).

By way of enfeoffment and purchase the nunnery became the liege lord of serfs in surrounding villages mainly on the sandy geest ridge of the Hohe Lieth. Territorially the convent and its immediate seigniorial precinct ([Kloster]Amt Neuenwalde, i.e. [convent] bailiwick) formed a wedge between the Saxe-Lauenburgian semi-autonomous Land of Hadeln (east; then including the convent's former location in Altenwalde) and the autonomous Land of Wursten (west), even northerly pointing to Hamburg's Ritzebüttel Bailiwick.

Militarily and politically the Neuenwalde Bailiwick formed a prince-archiepiscopal bridgehead amidst the autonomous peasant corporations (Hadeln, Wursten) and the upstream outposts of the cities of Hamburg and Bremen (Ritzebüttel, Bederkesa). The Tiebusch, a hill of 21.5 metres (71 ft) height, within the Neuenwalde boundary allows to look deeply into the Land of Hadeln. Thus the Neuenwalde Bailiwick, originally a part of the Land of Hadeln, was later considered neither part of Hadeln nor of Wursten.

The farmers in the so-called heath villages held the land they tilled in feudal tenancy (Meierverhältnis), subject to soccage and serjeanty for the convent, whereas the seigniorial jurisdiction was with the Senate of Hamburg, acquired from the Lappes by pawn in 1372. The convent wielded the feudal overlordship as well as the seigniorial jurisdiction over the villages of Neuenwalde proper, Krempel, the outlying farm Neumühlen, the Vorwerk Kransburg, Wanhöden, and the Altenwalde windmill.

The feudal tenants in Holßel, e.g., were subject to three days of serjeanty labour in the convent's premises or fields, as recorded for 1509. The inhabitants of Neuenwalde proper, forming a free dam, were considered part of the convent's familia. They were subject to regular serjeanty and to additional services on demand (so-called unmeasured services; German: ungemessene Dienste). On their emigration to Hamburg in 1375, where the Ministeriales of Flögeln adopted a civic career, they made over Flögeln proper and six more villages to the convent. Their Dornburg Castle was taken over by the prince-archbishopric as another military outpost.

Most lands of the convent were located on the hardly rank sandy Hohe Lieth, thus the nunnery was not rich and the convent buildings rather modest. The dowries of the novice nuns or conventuals were therefore most welcome to the convent. The declining Knights of Bederkesa were deep in debt, and – having already sold many a possession – had even pawned half the say in their bailiwick to the aspiring Mandelsloh family. They again lost this pawn to the city of Bremen, when in 1381 its troops stopped the three Mandelsloh brothers in their attempt to coin pawns from lending to Prince-Archbishop Albert II into territorial power. So Bremen gained its foothold as to uphold peace and order in its forecourt on the lower Weser course.

At that time the nunnery experienced a period of economic and political stability. 15 to 20 nuns were sustained at a time, women from Bremian prince-archiepiscopal knighthood, daughters of free peasants from the Land of Hadeln, as well as patrician daughters from Bremen and Hamburg. The nuns also produced cloth for sale, as recorded by a Hamburg merchant, who in 1386 sold 44 ells of cloth woven by a Neuenwalde nun. In the late fourteenth and fifteenth centuries, the convent may have provided loans for the peasantry in return for regular payments, but records of definite possessions are lacking from this period.

In 1389 the convent opened a tile-making and brick-works and acquired the necessary rights, land and wood for this purpose from the Knights of Elm in Elmlohe. The convent repaired roofs in the same year. On 30 November 1390 the convent received a papal indulgence, presumably for repairs to the Holy Cross Church. The relations with the Land of Wursten improved and on 24 June 1383 the Wursten Consuls donated several estates left by people without heirs to the convent in order to pray requiem masses for the deceased. In 1399 the convent concluded with the consuls of the Land of Wursten that they guaranteed safe-conduct through the Midlum parish for the pilgrims on their way to the Altenwalde Holy Cross Chapel.

In 1400 Prince-Archbishop Otto II granted a privilege that authorised the transfer to the parish church and granted an indulgence of forty days to all who aided with the new construction. In 1428 Prince-Archbishop Nicholas renewed the convent's privilege of granting indulgences both for visiting the church on certain feast days as well as for material aid in building and decorating the Holy Cross Church. Again, the nuns were described as poor at this time. In 1444 a new refectory was built.

This relatively stable era ended after on 26 December 1499 the Wursten Frisians had defeated the Great or Black Guard in Weddewarden, hired by Hadeln's Regent Magnus, the heir apparent of Saxe-Lauenburg to subject them. On New Year's Day 1500, the surviving mercenaries — trekking on towards Saxe-Lauenburgian Hadeln — ravaged and plundered the nunnery, before burning it to ashes. Choirbooks, documents, partially self-woven tapestries, chasubles and paraments were lost in the fire.

In 1503 the convent received an indulgence-privilege allowing for the reconstruction of the cloister, granted by the papal legate, Cardinal Raymond Peraudi. In circa 1508 Prince-Archbishop John III visited the convent in connection with his mission of reforming the convent along the lines of the Bursfelde Reform. John III promoted a stronger adherence to the Benedictine rule and stricter claustration. During his visit John III removed the previous prioress and, the convent elected Margarethe Eytzen their new prioress, whom he consecrated.

In 1509, at Eytzen's request, John III issued a writ confirming her election and her power in all conventual matters. It also confirmed the nuns' right to freely elect their prioresses with the approval of the prince-archbishop. The nuns also enjoyed the right to freely elect their provosts if necessary, and for twenty years afterwards, the convent appears to have operated without a provost.

In 1514 the convent's association with the Bursfelde Congregation, only admitting friaries as full members, was acknowledged. The abbots of St. Paul's Friary outside of Bremen served Neuenwalde as confessors and supervised the nuns' observance. For the elections of Neuenwalde's prioresses in 1515 (Margarethe von Reden) and 1517 (Wommella Wachmans) appeared Abbot Johannes Hesse of Rastede Friary, Abbot Hinrich Wildeshusen (aka Heinrich Junge) of St. Paul's Friary and the abbess of Heiligenrode Nunnery. Both abbesses, von Reden and Wachmans, were nuns from Heiligenrode, and resigned after short times in office.

In 1517 Prince-Archbishop Christopher the Spendthrift opened a campaign to subject the Wursten Frisians. The prince-archiepiscopal government demanded to levy taxes from newly dyked lands and the Wursten Frisians, claiming them as self-acquired, refused to pay. Thus Christopher the Spendthrift sent mercenaries into the Land of Wursten and on 23 December Wursten succumbed in the battle at the Wremer Tief. Christopher the Spendthrift declared Wursten's autonomous constitution nul and void and obtained his imperial enfeoffment with Wursten at the Diet of Augsburg of 1517.

On 4 August 1518 the consuls of the Land of Wursten, and envoys of the prince-archbishop met on the Wursten thingstead in order to fix the amount and to discuss the levying of the taxes. The parties flew into a fury and in the end the Wursten Frisians slew Dean Cordt Klencke, archdeacon of Hadeln and Wursten, Engelbert von der Malsburg, prince-archiepiscopal landdrost, and 16 more prince-archiepiscopal envoys.

For the upcoming prince-archiepiscopal response the Wursten Frisians allied with their former enemy Duke Magnus I of Saxe-Lauenburg, who confirmed their autonomy in return for rendering him homage. On 8 September 1518 ducal forces arriving by ship and Wursten fighters attacking from the land side razed the brandnew prince-archiepiscopal Morgenstern Castle in Weddewarden.

The Wursten Frisians saw their chance and covered the borderland adjacent to Wursten, including the Neuenwalde seigniorial bailiwick, with raids and attacks. In 1518 Prioress Wachmans appealed to the Wursten Consuls not to incite or even undertake the ravaging of houses and looting of grain and firewood from the convent's feudal tenants. Otherwise their wives and children would have to beg and freeze in the winter. In a deed of 20 December 1520 the nunnery is characterised as the monastery impoverished by fire and harrying. The troops of Christopher the Spendthrift finally subjected the Wursten Frisians in the Battle of Mulsum on 9 August 1524. The prince-archbishop then installed a Vogt (i.e. bailiff), directly ruling over the Wursten peasants.

In the 1520s, with the advent of the Lutheran Reformation the convent suffered and lost several of its temporalities and spiritualities. Between 1522 and 1526 the capable Nikolaus Zierenberg, prior of St. Paul's Friary near Bremen, travelled around, collected data on the convent's privileges and tried to assert them against renitent feudal tenant farmers in Altenwalde, Sievern and Wanna. The tenants in Sievern were supported in their renitence by the Bremian Bailiff of Bederkesa who thus deprived Neuenwalde of the village in favour of the Bederkesa Bailiwick. Zierenberg helped to set up a comprehensive inventory of the convent's estates and privileges.

Northerly adjacent to the convent's seigniorial precinct in Hamburg's Ritzebüttel Bailiwick, the inhabitants — including the convent's vassals in the heath villages — adopted Bugenhagen's Lutheran church order of 1529. Southerly and easterly neighbouring parishes in the Land of Hadeln also adopted Lutheranism, turning the nunnery and its immediate parish district into a Catholic diaspora.

The convent held the ius patronatus over the Holy Cross Church in Neuenwalde, to which the Holy Cross and St. Willehadus Chapel in Altenwalde was incorporated, whereas until the 1540s the convent could enforce its ius praesentandi over the Churches of Ss. Cosmas and Damian in Altenwalde, St. James the Greater in Holßel, St. Pancras in Midlum, St. George in Spieka, and St. George in Wanna.

Neuenwalde serfs evaded Catholic Holy Masses and attended Lutheran services in churches outside their parish, they further refused performing tithe and serjeanty. In 1533 Christopher the Spendthrift approved the plan of Prioress Anna Willers to construct a post mill in Altenwalde and to thirl the convent's feudal tenant farmers from the heath villages to that mill. In 1535 the Altenwalde mill, also called Klostermühle, was erected (demolished in 1913).

Prince-Archbishop Christopher's prodigality urged him to clutch at any available possessions in order to sell and pledge them so to satisfy his creditors. Therefore, in 1541 the city of Bremen, considering the Neuenwalde Convent with also Bremian patrician daughters among its conventuals and its vicinity to Bremen's Bederkesa bailiwick part of its sphere of interest, obtained a writ of protection from Emperor Charles V for the Neuenwalde Convent preventing any pecuniary injuries by Prince-Archbishop Christopher. The frustrated estates of the prince-archbishopric even succeeded to impeach Christopher the Spendthrift.

The steadfastly Catholic Prioress Dorothea von der Hude upheld Catholic faith in the nunnery and its seigniorial precinct, supported by Hadeln's and Wursten's Archdeacon Ludolf Klencke, also cathedral dean in Bremen. After Klencke's death in 1544, the new Dean Ludolf von Varendorf became the archdeacon, soon becoming Lutheran himself. The Land of Wursten, westerly adjacent to the Neuenwalde estates, followed suit with its inhabitants adopting Lutheranism after 1546. In 1547 again Wursten Frisians ravaged the convent and its still Catholic villages of Krempel, Neuenwalde and Wanhöden.

With the ius praesentandi in Midlum the convent determined the priest there, in 1557 being the Catholic Nikolaus Stroßborg, and chose him as confessor for the convent. In 1557 — under pressure by Joachim Moller, Hamburg's bailiff in Ritzebüttel — Prioress von der Hude could not help it to confirm the Lutheran Hinrich Voß as preacher of Ss. Cosmas and Damian in Altenwalde, however, binding him to refrain from any hetz against the nuns. On this occasion prioress and convent appealed against the alienation of mostly liturgical devices from the Altenwalde Ss. Cosmas and Damian Church in favour of the newly founded Döse church.

With the death of Bremen's last Catholic Prince-Archbishop George in 1566 Neuenwalde's position as a Catholic stronghold became more difficult. In 1568 von der Hude negotiated with envoys of the Lutheran Senate of Hamburg and of George's successor on the Bremen see, the Lutheran Administrator regnant Henry III of Saxe-Lauenburg, on the Altenwalde church affairs, the binding of convent's tenants in the heath villages to allegiance with Hamburg, and the billetting of its bailiff's beadles there. When in 1569 von der Hude tried to present Father Dyrdyck as the Catholic successor of the first Lutheran preacher at St. James in Holßel, she succumbed to the opposition of the Bremian Drost in the Bederkesa Bailiwick. In Neuenwalde von der Hude defended the Catholic faith throughout 30 years until her death in 1571.

Prioress von der Hude was succeeded by the likewise Catholic Anna Brummers. Hamburg's Bailiff Balthasar von Meinssen forbade the convent's feudal tenants in the heath villages within Hamburg's Ritzebüttel Bailiwick to obey to their feudal lord, the new prioress, and to deliver her the feudal Welcome dues. The bailiff further billeted his beadles with the convent's tenant farmers in the heath villages, whom he further made swear allegiance to the Hamburg senate. Brummers employed Father Hesius as Catholic confessor. In 1576, however, Brummers was forced to resign after years of quarrel with Lutheran conventuals and under pressure of the cathedral chapter and Administrator Henry III. Brummers was reproached with a too intimate interaction with Father Hesius and the convent's forest manager as well as with her careless management of the convent's possessions.

In 1584 the first Lutheran pastor is recorded for the Neuenwalde parish. Since the preachers were to be appointed in consensus with the prioress, the employment of a Lutheran pastor indicates the conversion of most nuns to Lutheranism too. The nunnery as an institution to sustain unmarried women, Catholic nuns and Lutheran conventuals side by side, was to be maintained, thus it was transformed into a Lutheran damsels' convent. The convent was supported and protected by the Knighthood of the Bremian prince-archbishopric whose kinswomen made up the nuns and conventuals.

In 1586 the convent and the Land of Hadeln settled a long-lasting boundary dispute within the scope of the Buxtehude Recess. The recess further provided that Hamburg's bailiff in Ritzebüttel, then Joachim Beckendorff, ended billetting beadles in the heath villages and prompted the restitution of the abducted liturgical devices to the Ss. Cosmas and Damian Church in Altenwalde. In 1588 the number of conventuals amounted to 15 or 16. They elected Margarethe Wevers their new prioress. She chose Oswald Brügmann as Catholic confessor. Provost Ortgis von Wersabe rented out Kransburg Vorwerk to the Bremen citizen Bolte which measured about 250 hectares (620 acres) at that time.

In 1595 Father Antonius Meyer (then Zeven Convent, formerly St. Paul's Friary outside of Bremen) visited the convent in order to invest new Catholic nuns. When in the 1580s and 1590s the Senate of Bremen urged the adoption of Calvinism in the then Lutheran parishes in Bremen's Bailiwick of Bederkesa (Amt Bederkesa, between 1381/1421 and 1654 under the city's rule), Neuenwalde remained Lutheran, whereas the senate succeeded in Bederkesa proper, Debstedt, Flögeln, Holßel, Lehe, and St. Fabian Church in Ringstedt.

After Administrator regnant John Frederick had found the convent in disorder as to the discipline (unchastity) and the management, in 1606 he decreed a new monastic order, prescribing to learn according to Luther's Catechism. The mismanagement, the withholding of revenues and dues, the theft of timber from the convent forests forced the reduction of the number of conventuals to maximally ten. The conventuals were ordered to hold a more sober diet, as was their regular attendance of the Lutheran services. In 1606 Administrator John Frederick ordered the election of a new provost who would also keep the books of the convent, before done very unorderly. In 1614 John Frederick again reformed the monastic order. The convent sold the relics, anyway useless for Lutherans, to the Administrator regnant in 1620, and later the cathedral chapter resold them in order to raise money.

In the Thirty Years' War after the Battle of Lutter on 17/27 August 1626^{O.S./N.S.} the Catholic Leaguist forces invaded the Prince-Bishopric of Verden and threatened the neighbouring Bremen Prince-Archbishopric. Meanwhile Christian IV of Denmark, Duke of Holstein, since May 1625 officiating in the latter of his functions as Circle Colonel (commander-in-chief) of the joint troops of the Lower Saxon Circle, and allied with the Anglo-Dutch war coalition, concentrated Lower Saxon troops in the prince-archbishopric and ordered additional Dutch, English and French troops to land in the prince-archbishopric. By 1627 Christian IV had de facto dismissed his cousin Administrator regnant John Frederick from the Bremian see.

Wallenstein invaded Christian IV's Duchy of Holstein, who therefore deployed his forces in order to fight that invasion. Tilly then invaded the exposed prince-archbishopric and captured its southern parts. The Bremian cities shut their gates and entrenched behind their fortifications. Tilly captured one fortified city after the other. On 20 January 1628 in his encampment near Buxtehude Tilly personally wrote out a salva guardia (safe-guard) for the Neuenwalde Convent. In 1628 he beleaguering Stade with its remaining garrison of 3,500 Danish and English soldiers. On 25 April/5 May 1628^{O.S./N.S.} Tilly granted them safe-conduct to England and Denmark–Norway and on 27 April/7 May 1628^{O.S./N.S.} the complete prince-archbishopric was in his hands. Between 1628 and 1629 most Protestant preachers fled the area.

On 6 June 1629 playing children caused a fire, destroying all the convent buildings, including the Holy Cross Church. Only the close by watermill survived. Six conventuals, all Lutheran, were rehoused in emergency shelters. The reconstruction started right away. The Holy Cross Church was restored between 1630 and 1634 with most of its interior dating back to the following decades.

==== From 1630 to 1685 ====
In March 1629 Emperor Ferdinand II had decreed the Edict of Restitution, by which possessions of Roman Catholic ecclesiastical entities converted after 1552 (Peace of Passau) to Protestantism, Calvinist or Lutheran alike, and acquired before the conversion, and possessions deprived after 1552 from Catholic entities had to be restituted to Catholic institutions. A Jesuit college based in Stade was installed in order to Catholicise the population in the Bremen prince-archbishopric.

In December 1629 subdelegates of the Restitution Commission appeared in Neuenwalde in order to take possession of the convent. On 17/27 July 1630^{O.S./N.S.} the convent was then conveyanced to Jesuits, represented by Father Matthias Kalkhoven, superior of the Stade Jesuits, expelling the conventuals, after they had refused to convert to Catholicism, but granting them a small compensation. The convent's revenues were used to finance the Jesuit college in Stade.

In the second half of April 1632, after the Swedish victory in the Battle of Rain, the Imperialist and Leaguist forces left the prince-archbishopric and with them the foreign Catholic clergy. Then the allied troops of Sweden, of the city of Bremen and of the Prince-Archbishopric of Bremen, under command of Achatius Tott, captured the prince-archbishopric and John Frederick resumed his office as Administrator regnant.

Highly indebted as he was after recruiting and arming his troops allied with the Swedes, he brought in a bill to confiscate all the monasteries in the prince-archbishopric. However, on 20 and 28 May 1633^{O.S.} on the diet in Basdahl the estates of the prince-archbishopric rejected that, but allowed Administrator John Frederick to collect the revenues of the monasteries until the Thirty Years' War would end. Some conventuals returned to Neuenwalde.

With the leaguist occupiers gone and John Frederick's death in 1634 the greatest antagonists to the continued existence of the convents had disappeared, since the estates supporting them prevailed again. By 1634 the convent had been reëstablished. Definitely then the conventuals elected Otto Asche(n) Frese their new provost and obliged him to protect them in their Lutheran faith as traditional by the Augsburg Confession. Since 1634 Frese took care of the reconstruction of convent and cloister.

The conventuals committed themselves to live a life pleasing to the Lord (German: gottgefälliges Leben). On 10 October 1635 provost and conventuals elected a new prioress, then titled domina, Margarete Drewes. In 1636 the convent buildings were externally reconstructed. The conventuals resumed educating and lodging noble girls as had been the practice of old.

By the Peace of Westphalia in 1648 the prince-archiepiscopal elective monarchy was secularised as the heritable Duchy of Bremen, which was jointly ruled with the new Principality of Verden, as Bremen-Verden, since both imperial fiefs were bestowed on the Swedish crown. By the 1650s the previous religious bodies, such as the Lutheran cathedral chapter or the archdeaconries, had been abolished, their revenues mostly confiscated, with only few of them not granted to Swedish war veterans.

On 20 June 1648 Queen Christina of Sweden invested the veteran and former Paymaster General Melchior Degingk (Degens) 1616–1683; later ennobled von Schlangenfel[d]t) with the convent as a fief heritable in the male line (Mannlehen). The revenues of the convent then amounted to Rixdollar (Rtlr) 1,214 annually. Degingk had to aliment the then remaining conventuals for their lifetime and allowed them continue living in the convent. New conventuals were not admitted any more, the convent was to die out.

==== Since the Knighthood runs the convent ====
Coat of arms of the Bremian Knighthood

The Knighthood objected the Swedish closure of all damsels' convents in the Duchy of Bremen and tried to rescue at least one of them. The Knighthood argued that — for the benefit for their unmarried kinswomen — especially their families had donated the estates which the queen — ignoring that purpose — enfeoffed to foreign war veterans. Led by its President Görd (Gerhard) von der Lieth (in office from 1672 to 1679) the Knighthood undertook long negotiations. On 17 April 1676 Charles XI of Sweden finally promised Neuenwalde to the Knighthood on Degingk's death.

After the Bremen-Verden Campaign troops of Duke George William of Brunswick and Lunenburg, Prince of Lunenburg-Celle occupied among others the Neuenwalde Bailiwick from August 1676 to 1679. In 1683 Degingk died without heirs and the former convent with its estates reverted to the crown, i.e. Charles XI. On 3 July 1683 he conveyanced the convent to the Knighthood for the "sustenance and education of the non-provided daughters" (German: Erhaltung und Education der nicht vergebenen Töchter).

On 3 and 4 June 1684 the Knighthood convened for a diet in Basdahl and passed a new convent statute (Klosterordnung), confirmed that year on October 21 in Stockholm by Charles XI. The statute remained, slightly altered, valid until 2004. The statute stipulated that on its diets the Knighthood — in case of a vacancy — would elect prioresses, directors, and bailiffs (Amtleute). The conventuals, however, were granted the right to present two candidates to the Knighthood which then elects one of them the prioress.

Through the statute the Knighthood committed itself to provide "necessary sustenance of noble damsels" (German: nothdürftige Unterhaltung adelicher Jungfrauen). The Knighthood granted its members the privilege to enlist kinswomen in the convent. Women aspirants from other families had to bring evidence that they were of knightly origin. On its diets, convening twice a year, the Knighthood admitted the new conventuals. Due to the restricted resources never more than two sisters or half-sisters at a time were to be admitted as conventuals or aspirants. Their minimum age was fixed at 18 years.

The 1684 Convent Statute stipulated that the conventuals must not wear gold or silver jewellery, and should don preferentially black or white cloth, allowing also silk. They had to be of Augsburg Confession and to attend daily common prayers between 8 and 9 o'clock and from 17:00 to 18:00 hours. The conventuals were provided free heating, board and lodge, as well as annually Rtlr 30 (the prioress the double sum).

Conventuals were allowed to temporarily leave the convent, e.g. for travels, only with a permit of the prioress. An absence longer than two months entailed a reduction of the maintenance. Conventuals were allowed to quit the convent in order to marry if they paid Rtlr 80 to it, and several women took the opportunity.

Until 6 June 1689 meals were taken communally, and each conventual was allowed to host one noble young damsel for education. Each girl's family had to pay annually M.lb. 100 for their board and lodge. Men, however, with the exception of male servants, were forbidden to stay overnight within the convent. Sick male relatives hosted and taken care by a conventual were excepted from the prohibition.

On 27 August 1685 the inauguration of the convent was celebrated. The number of conventuals was initially restricted to eight, among them Anna von der Lieth, who had already lived in the convent before the Thirty Years' War, Metta Maria Clüver (1667–1759), Gerdruth von der Lieth, Barbara Magdalena von der Decken, Judith Maria Lütcken, Sophia Hedewig Lütcken, and Caecilia Maria von der Medem.

In 1684 the Knighthood had claimed the advowson, including it in the monastic statute (Klosterordnung) royally confirmed in the same year, erroneously assuming the advowson had been with Degingk before. Thus on the occasion of the next vacancy at the Holy Cross Church the Knighthood elected Pastor Valentin Bothe in 1687. Bremen-Verden's general government protested this and by a declaratory action enforced its advowson. In the dispute on appointing preachers to the Holy Cross Church the general government conceded only the ius praesentandi to the Knighthood. In 1701 Christoph and Arp von Düring (1728–1732 president of the Knighthood) erected an additional lodging (Düringsches Haus) for their sister Auguste Hedwig von Düring in order to get her accepted into the convent.

By the Treaty of Stockholm of 1715 Bremen-Verden was transferred in personal union to the Electorate of Hanover. On 19/30 September 1716^{O.S./N.S.} George I, King of Great Britain and Elector of Hanover, donated Rtlr 500 in cash to extend the lodgings, and another annual Rtlr 225 from fiscal revenues (amounting to Rtlr 4,500 at an imagined interest of 5%) in order to sustain two more conventuals (thus 10). On 11/22 June 1717^{O.S./N.S.} George I ordered the Hanoverian Privy Council to defray the payments.

The Christmas Flood of 1717 and the one on 15 February 1718 destroyed the dikes and flooded Neuenfelde, acreages in the Land of Wursten in which the convent had the major share. The dike reconstruction was a lengthy and costly effort for the convent and the other parties holding land in the area. In 1718 Sebastian von der Lieth donated Rtlr 600 for another place (thus 11), first given to his sister Lücke Judith von der Lieth.

From 1719 to 1721 the Altes Kloster building was extended by a timber-framed southern wing in order to increase the lodgings. However, always more unmarried noblewomen applied than could be admitted. Living in the convent provided the women with a reliable living and allowed a conduct of life not influenced and depending on the goodwill by male kinsfolk.

In 1756 Maria Amalia Marschalken paid Rtlr 300 for the installation of another lodging for herself as additional conventual (thus 12). In 1758 Margaretha von Düring, sister of Johann Christian von Düring, president of the Knighthood, lived in the Düringsches Haus. A donation of Rtlr 400 in 1764 allowed hosting one more conventual (thus 13, including the prioress). Which was still the case in 1786.

After on 18 May 1803 Britain had declared war on France, French troops invaded and occupied Bremen-Verden, arriving in Neuenwalde on June 10. In autumn of 1805, at the beginning of the War of the Third Coalition against France (1805–1806) the Imperial French occupational troops left in a campaign against the Archduchy of Austria. British, Swedish and Russian coalition forces took over. In early 1806 the French-Allied Brandenburg-Prussia captured Bremen-Verden.

But when Prussia had turned against France, entailing the latter's victory over the former (Jena-Auerstedt, 11 November 1806), France recaptured the area. Napoléon ceded Bremen-Verden to his client state, the Kingdom of Westphalia. On 7 October 1810 King Jérôme Bonaparte seized the convent with all its pertinent estates, revenues and dues in favour of the royal government. After the French annexation of all the Westphalian coastal departments in December 1810, on 27 August 1811 the French government dissolved the convent. Despite the Napoleonic discourse about freedom there was no emancipation of the serfs in the Hanseatic Departments, neither under Westphalian nor under French rule.

After the end of the French annexation (1811–1813) it took some time until the convent was restituted to the Knighthood. In 1816 the conventuals returned, their number was increased to 14 and remained at that level throughout the nineteenth century.

Between 1831 and 1833 King William IV of Hanover and the United Kingdom decreed several acts allowing tenant farmers to become proprietors of the land they tilled thus effectuating the emancipation of the serfs in the Kingdom of Hanover, of which Bremen-Verden formed part since 1814. However, the laws paved the way for the emancipation, but specific procedures, in order to find out the actual dues, monetarised or in kind alike, the lands subject to socage, the services to be delivered to the masters, and fixing the payments redeeming these burdens, and finally assigning the lands as property to the former tenants and the former lords, only started on request of the tenants wishing their emancipation. Unlike the earlier emancipation of the serfs in Prussia (1810, with redemption procedures starting in 1811) the Hanoverian laws provided only for payments, in instalments, but not generally for cessions of land the tenants tilled, in order to compensate their former feudal lords.

In 1841 the convent still concluded a new feudal tenancy. In the following years a royal land surveyor measured all the land and estimated the soil quality, an authorised agent prepared the redemption procedure of dues and service duties, annulling the convent of its feudal privileges and fixing annuity payments to the convent by which its former tenants would redeem their former feudal duties. In 1852 Neuenwalde comprised Calenberg Morgen (Mg) 11,662 (=12,226.44 hectares [30,212.2 acres]), of which Mg 8225 (=8,623.9 hectares [21,310 acres]) were to be redistributed.

The overall arable surface was divided into forests amounting to Mg 622 (652.1 hectares [1,611 acres]), village green (Angerweiden) to Mg 218 (228.55 hectares [564.8 acres]), heaths to Mg 3,353 (3,515.29 hectares [8,686.5 acres]), mires to Mg 4,030 (4,225.05 hectares [10,440.3 acres]), lakes (Dahlem Lake) to Mg 221 (231.7 hectares [573 acres]), specific convent possessions to Mg 676 (708.72 hectares [1,751.3 acres]), and private possessions to Mg 2,541 (2,663.98 hectares [6,582.8 acres]). The redemption procedure proposed that Mg 2,229.09 (2,336.98 hectares [5,774.8 acres]) would be assigned to the convent as its property. The new proprietors annual instalments of payments to redeem their former tenant dues and service duties lasted until 1876, partially longer. In lieu of part of their payments the proprietors of Krempel ceded 75 hectares (190 acres) of sandy heath to the convent, which it subsequently reforested.

In 1944 and 1945 bombed out people from cities such as Bremen, Bremerhaven and Hamburg and refugees and expellees from the eastern territories of Germany were billeted in the convent. In the 1950s they gradually evacuated the building again to other places (labour migration) or into newly built homes in the area.

On 3 December 1963, at the behest of the Knighthood, the Lower Saxon cabinet recognised King Charles XI's bestowal of the convent with its estates to the Knighthood, stating: "Due to its historical development and especially to the deed of the Swedish King Charles XI of 3 July 1683 the Neuenwalde Convent is the property of the Knighthood of the Duchy of Bremen based in Stade." Therefore, the cabinet concluded, "it is only up to the Knighthood to update the antiquated convent statute."

Between 2009 and 2011 the convent exchanged its dated oil-fired heating system for wood chip heating. The new heating system reduces the fuel bill by €18,800 or 75% annually and will thus amortise within seven to eight years. Since 2012 the Neuenwalde Convent coöperates with the Evangelisches Bildungszentrum Bad Bederkesa. Hans Christian Brandy, land superintendent of the Lutheran Stade Diocese and head of the board of the Bildungszentrum, aims to broaden the role of the Neuenwalde Convent as a centre of encounter and education for the people in the Elbe–Weser triangle. Jörg Matzen, chief manager of the Bildungszentrum, announced that in future guests will be offered opportunities to retreat. Groups and single guests as well as delegations from institutions and enterprises will be addressed.

== Convent buildings ==
Convent and church were built on boulders on a sand spit amidst of mires. The construction was arduous and took many years. A stream was diverted from the Westerwedele creek to the convent buildings in order to serve as a fresh water supply and a sewer.

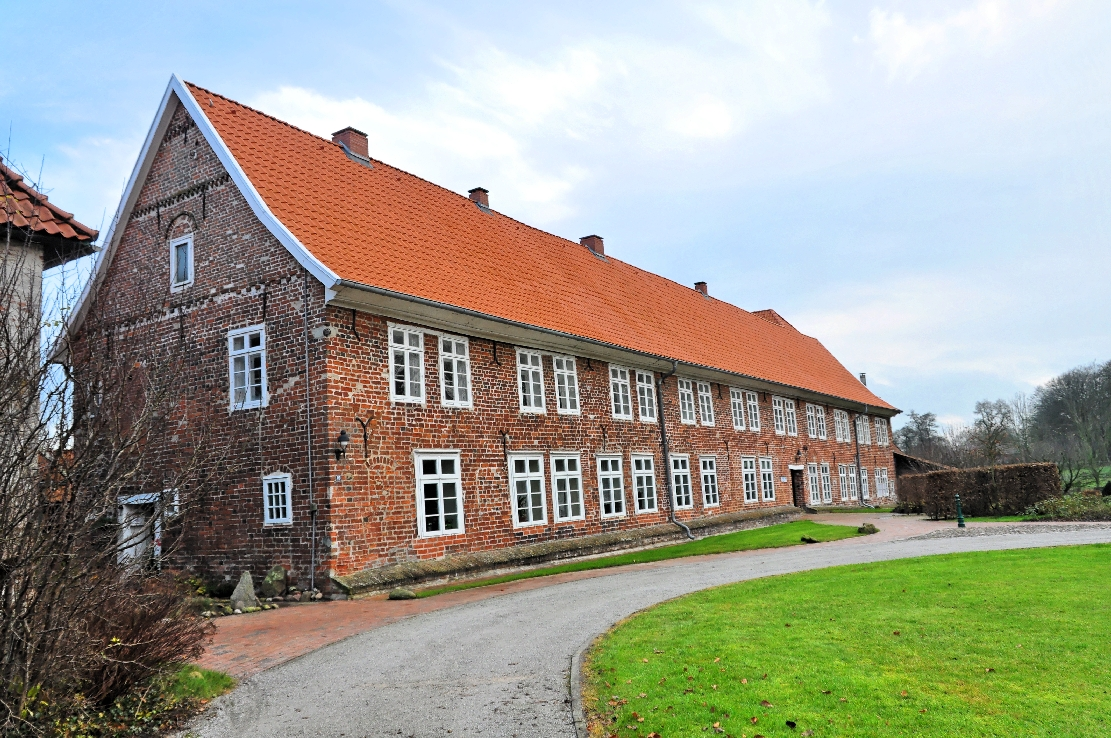
The Altes Kloster building. 2012.

The convent building Altes Kloster is 45 metres (148 ft) long, and the whole compound covers 689.545 square metres (7,422.20 sq ft). The cells were directed westwards, the window form was later changed and some of the cell windows are recognisable, though bricked up with hand-made brick of Klosterformat (height: 90 to 100 mm [3.5 to 3.9 in], length: 280 to 300 mm [11 to 12 in], and width: 130 to 140 mm [5.1 to 5.5 in]) size. A long corridor on the eastern side connected the cells most likely to the 1444-built refectory, not preserved. On the first floor a bridge connected the Altes Kloster directly with Holy Cross Church, to the so-called nuns' gallery, today's organ loft. Above the western portal the inscription gives the year 1636 as the year of reconstruction after the 1629 fire.

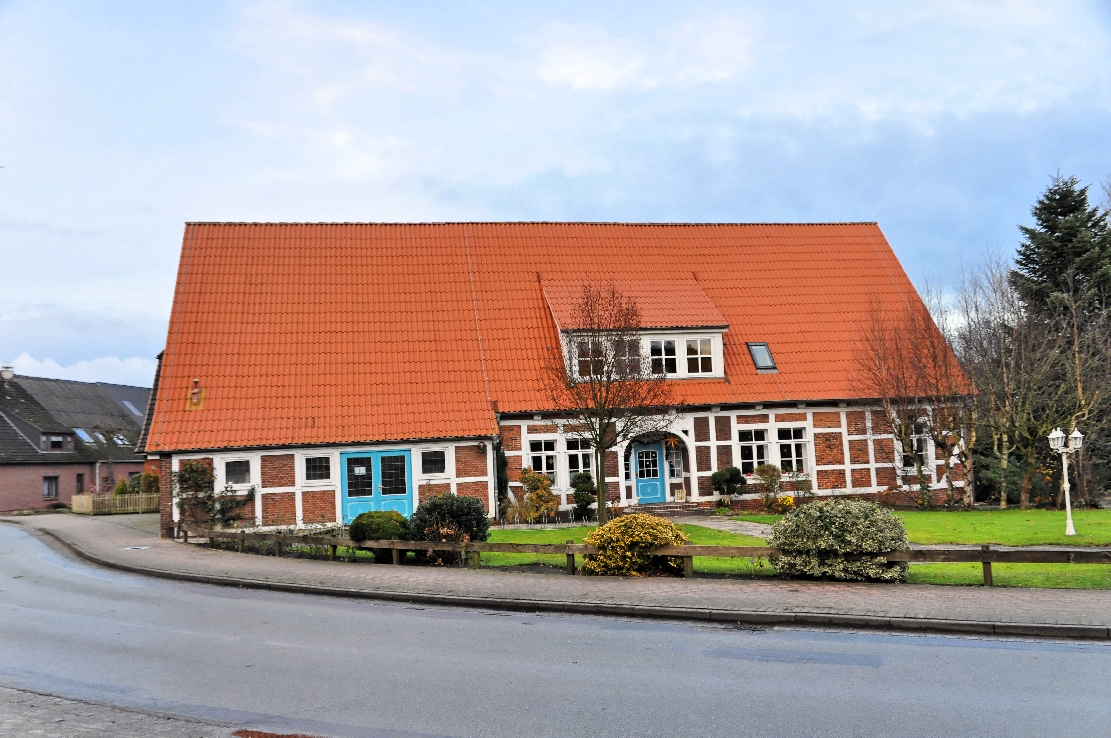
The parsonage

General Superintendent Johann Hinrich Pratje reports that Neuenwalde comprised the convent building, the church, the bailiff's office (Amtshaus), the parsonage, the sextry, the watermill and 53 more hearthes (i.e. households) for the second half of the eighteenth century. In 1775 the Knighthood built a school for the children of its feudal tenant farmers. Later more extensions followed, a turf barn and a granary (1873). In 1888 the tithebarn (Zehntscheune), anyway tithes were no more collected, was rebuilt into apartments for conventuals, one of them for the prioress.

== Seals ==
The convent had a seal prior to 1282, but it is no longer extant. The earliest preserved conventual seal dates to 1289. Unfortunately, this seal has shattered into several splintered pieces and cannot be reconstructed. It is believed, from documentary references to it, to have depicted Mary next to the cross or that an older seal from Midlum with the Virgin was used. A later seal from the fourteenth century depicts the cross with the words: «Sigillum Sancte Crucis in Wolde». Another, smaller seal was also used up until 1417. It is round and depicts a shield with a cross on it with the words: «S.[anctimoniales] des cruce to nienwolde». Both seals appear with that of Provost Herbord (1360) in the appendix of the Urkundenbuch des Klosters Neuenwalde by Heinrich Rüther.

== Possessions and revenues ==
The offshoots of the Hohe Lieth range (part of Wesermünde Geest) mark the westerly part of the Neuenwalde local subdistrict within the city of Geestland. Here the forests of the convent are to be found. The forests of the convent are the Dahlemer Holz, the Fahlenbruch, the Heubusch, the Klosterbruch, the Rhodenbruch, and the Stühbusch.

Besides the forests, the serf farmers in a number of villages were subject to dues to be delivered and duties to be provided to the convent, before their emancipation. With the foundation of the convent in 1219, the Knights of Diepholz granted the convent their possessions and rights in and around Midlum in the Land of Wursten. In the subsequent years the convent purchased privileges in the villages of Honstede (Hustedt), Da(h)lem, Krempel, and rights to tithes in Wenekenbutle (Wenckenbüttel).

By 1280 the provost of the convent had at his disposal dues from the villages of Holßel, Esigstedt (Esigstede) and Sorthum (a part of today's Midlum). Following disputes between the local nobles and the Wursten Frisians over privileges to fields and woods, the convent grew more impoverished. The charter of transfer stated that the nuns suffered from poverty in 1282.

With the convent's transfer to Altenwalde in 1282 came new acquisitions in the villages of Walle and of Northum. The convent grew in land possessions and tithes from Arensch, Berensch, Gudendorf, Oxstedt, Holte and Spangen. The convent also received a third of the revenues from the parish Church of Ss. Cosmas and Damian in Altenwalde.

The convent's relocation to Wolde (present Altenwalde) and its takeover of the pilgrimage Chapel of the Holy Cross and St. Willehadus on the Mount was undoubtedly intended to place the convent in a better material position. From Wolde the convent established an outlying watermill, the Erbzinsmühle, later included in the 1334-founded Neuenwalde. The convent's transfer into the vicinity of that watermill (present Neuenwalde) appears to have been materially advantageous, and the fourteenth century probably was the most prosperous in the convent's history.

At this time the convent's possessions and privileges reached southwards towards Sievern, Wehden, Spaden and Lehe (a part of today's Bremerhaven). The convent acquired goods, dues in kind and tithes from the holdings of the Knights of Bederkesa and their vassals and also purchased other lands. On 11 November 1376 the priests of Wanna, Lehe and Nordleda confirmed the pawning of two farms in Nordleda to the Neuenwalde Convent. In 1389 the convent acquired the rights to construct a brickworks from the Knights of Elm. Today the brickworks is recalled by a field name in former Dahlem. In July 1406 Heine Brand conveyanced his homestead in Nordleda to the convent.

The convent's feudal tenant farmers were charged with the great and small tithe, as well as with serjeanty as to manual labour and transport duties (so-called harness duties; Spanndienste) too. Neuenwalde's cotters paid annually Shilling (Sh) 32. Every Easter the tenant farmers in Neuenwalde proper had to pay Rtlr 13:20 Sh of Grundheuer (a land tax), all numbers recorded for 1778. Every St. Martin's Day, e.g., they each were to pay Rtlr:Sh 142:16:²/₃ estate service money (Hofdienstgeld; i.e. the monetarised duty to work on the convent's premises) and to deliver 8 tonnes and 3 Himten of rye (all numbers for 1778). On each Christmas they had to pay Rtlr:Sh 20:28 of hire guilder (Heuergulden; i.e. another land tax).

Generally the convent was considered to be poor. Therefore, also the convent's share in contributing to the expenses of a coronation of a new Holy Roman Emperor and the necessary first travel to Rome was rather low, it was less than 0.0014% (or 30/22016) of the total sum to be levied in the prince-archbishopric. During the fifteenth century the convent was systematically deprived of its possessions and dependents. By turn of the fifteenth to sixteenth century the annual revenues of Neuenwalde were recorded with a low Rtlr 600, whereas the total revenues of all ten monasteries within the prince-archbishopric (without those in the city of Bremen proper) amounted to Rtlr 37,100. In 1648, when Degingk was enfeoffed with the convent, the revenues amounted to Rtlr 1,214 annually.

Several of the formerly feudally dependent villages, such as Da(h)lem (last mentioned as a settled place in 1367), Holte (near Altenwalde), and Honstede (Hustedt), were abandoned until the fourteenth century, with some (Esigstedt and Wenckebüttel) even of presently unknown former location. The feudal dues collected from feudal tenant farmers in the so-called heath villages (Heidedörfer; Arensch, Berensch, Gudendorf, Holte, and Oxstedt) were lost to Hamburg by the end of the sixteenth century. Among the villages whose feudal tenants were emancipated in the mid-nineteenth century, their dues thus lost for the convent, are Wanhöden, and the Kransburg Vorwerk.

The annual directorial honorarium of Rtlr 100 was always donated to the convent, and at times other members of the Knighthood made their own endowments. Other occasional revenues were the fees of Rtlr 80 charged when conventuals quit in order to marry. If the family of a deceased conventual wanted to inherit her estate her heirs were charged with Rtlr 20 or 24, according to different sources. New noble families aiming at being admitted as members of the Knighthood had to pay ducat 100, as decided by the diet of the Knighthood in 1721.

== Leadership ==
The provost and prioress stewarded the convent's possessions together.

=== Prioresses and dominae ===
In German the prioress is called Priorin, at times also Priörin. According to the monastic statute of 1684, the prioress should be of noble descent, of Augsburg Confession, a kinswomen of a nobleman seated in the diet, and not insane.

- Mechthildis: mentioned in 1311 and 1315
- Dorothea von der Heyde: mentioned in 1319
- Yde: mentioned in 1333
- Catharina von Levenberg: mentioned in 1356 and 1362
- Adelheid von Duvensee: 1363–1383 in office
- Liutgard/Lutgarde von Gröpelingen: 1389–1417 in office, mentioned also in 1363, 1365, and 1370
- Alleke Hollinges/Adelheid Hollynges: 1427–1445 in office
- Adelheid Hanenpiepen: mentioned in 1484 and 1487
- Margarethe Eytzen/ Margaretha Eytzem: mentioned in 1489, 1508, 1509 and 1515
- Margarethe von Reden: 1515–1517 in office; came from Heiligenrode Convent, whereto she returned, 1551 she was prioress there
- Wommella Wachmans/Wommela Wachmann(s): 1517–1520 in office; came from Heiligenrode Convent, whereto she returned, 1541 she was prioress there, after 1549 abbess, died in 1554
- Anna Willers: 1520–1538 in office
- Dorothea von Hude: 1538–1571 in office
- Anna Brummer(s): 1571–1576 in office; also mentioned in 1573, converted to Lutheranism while in office
- Margarethe Wevers: 1588–1598 in office, converted to Lutheranism while in office
- Adelheid von Sutholte/Sudtholdt: 1598–1599 in office, she was the first prioress appointed as a Lutheran
- vacancy: 1599–1635, maybe due to quarrels between Catholic nuns and Lutheran conventuals
- Margarete Drewes: 1635–1648 in office, titled domina
- vacancy: 1648–1685
- Ottilia Margarethe Marschalck: 1685–1715 in office
- Cæcilia Maria von der Me(h)den: 1716–1740 in office
- Elisabeth Dorothea von Wersebe: 1740–1750 in office
- Anna Catharina von der Lieth: 1751–1755 in office
- Augusta Louise von Oldenburg: 1755–1758 in office
- Miss von Düring: by 1761
- Miss von Issendorff: by 1819
- Miss von Düring: by 1888
- Dr. Thora-Elisabeth von der Decken (1921–2012): 1988–2007 in office
- Veronika von der Decken (b. 1936): since 2007 in office

=== Vögte / (ad)vocates ===
The (ad)vocate (German: Vogt) exerted military protection, managed the Vorwerk, and exercised police function in the convent's seigniorial bailiwick. Initially the Knights of Diepholz wielded the Vogtei, later succeeded by the Knights of Bederkesa, related by marriage, but declining since the mid-fourteenth century.

=== Provosts ===
The nuns elected a male provost as their legal warden as well as their representative at the diets of the prince-archbishopric. The provost also wielded the summary jurisdiction in Neuenwalde's manorial court precinct, and in absence of a(n ad)vocate the provost also collected the dues and leases. Until 1282 two provosts originated from the family of the Knights of Bederkesa. The German term is Propst or, less colloquial Probst.

- Marquardus: mentioned in 1281
- Thiderich: mentioned in 1311 and 1315
- Nicolaus: mentioned in 1332 and 1333
- Willekinus: mentioned in 1338
- Meinardus: mentioned in 1339
- Herbordus: mentioned in 1356 and 1360
- Lambertus: mentioned in 1365
- Swedere Krusen: mentioned in 1398
- Gerward von Sandbeke: mentioned in 1427
- Gerhardus Suidewind: mentioned in 1432, also canon at St. Ansgar's Collegiate Church, Bremen
- Nicolaus Ossenwerder: mentioned in 1445
- Bernardus Staffhorst: mentioned in 1481
- Nicolaus Rust: mentioned in 1481
- Nicolaus Minstedt the Elder (Mynstede[n]): mentioned in 1483 and in 1495, died in 1508
- Vacancy: 1508–1529
- Who?: 1529–1542
- Nicolaus Minstedt the Younger (My[n]stede): 1542–1547 in office; simultaneously ecclesiastical counsellor of the prince-archbishopric
- Dieterich Slepegrel: mentioned in 1528
- Ortgis von Wersebe: 1562–1594 in office; 1558–1561 Landdrost of the prince-archbishopric
- vacancy: 1594–1615?
  - Gotthardt Brobergen: 1610 as steward on behalf of the Administrator regnant
- Levin Marschalck: 1615–1627 in office; simultaneously Landdrost of the prince-archbishopric, also mentioned in 1622
- vacancy: 1627–1633?
  - Laurentius Marquardi: 1632–1633 as steward on behalf of the Administrator regnant, 1630–1632 Landdrost of the prince-archbishopric
- Otto Asche Frese: 1634–????; since 1625 already provost of the Ss. Willehadus and Stephen canon college in Bremen, advanced in 1638 from magister scholarum to dean at Bremen Cathedral

=== Directors ===
The directors of the convent are elected by the diets of the Bremian Knighthood from its midst. Since 1691 the president of the Knighthood serves in personal union as the director. Until 1866 the director was an ex officio member (Landrat) of the parliament, the Hanoverian Estates Assembly, thus representing the convent with the estates as earlier used to be the task of the provosts. The presidents of the Knighthood never took their annual directorial honorarium of Rtlr 100, but donated it to the convent. At times the directors used to appoint an administrator (Klosterverwalter), at times also called Amtmann (bailiff), presiding over the Neuenwalde Bailiwick.

- 1684–1688: Joachim Lüt(tc)ken
- 1688–1696: Jürgen Marschalck, since 1691 also president of the Knighthood
- 1696–1715: Jürgen von der Lieth
- 1715–1728: Alexander Schulte
- 1728–1732: Arp von Düring
- 1733–1751: Arnd von Schade
- 1752–1766: Johann Christian von Düring
- 1767–1803: Caspar Ludwig Schulte
- 1804–1808: Otto Detlev Marschalck
- 1809–1816: Engelbert Johann Marschalck
- 1817–1819: Diederich Christian Arnold von Zesterfleth
- ~1846: Wilhelm Otto von der Decken
- 18??–18??: George Ayhsford Burchard von der Decken
- 18??–1881: Friedrich von der Decken
- 1881–19??: ?
- 19??–1954: Max Marschalck von Bachtenbrock
- 1954–1963: ?
- 1963–1989: Thassilo von der Decken
- 1989–2001: Herwart von der Decken
- since 2002: Dr. Eduard von Reden-Lütcken

=== Amt Neuenwalde ===
Since the enfeoffment of Degingk with the former convent its precinct as a seigniorial entity with its former Vorwerk Kransburg, its socage farmers and revenues from dues and fines in its jurisdiction was called the Neuenwalde [Convent] Bailiwick (German: [Kloster]Amt Neuenwalde). The term convent continued to be in use, but referred more to the buildings than to the wider administrative subdivision, including Neuenwalde proper and the neighbouring villages of Krempel, Wanhöden, Kransburg Vorwerk, Neumühlen outlying farm, and the Altenwalde Klostermühle windmill (the latter till 1768), all subject to the former convent's seigniorial jurisdiction and to dues to be collected.

In 1715 the Danes, occupying since 1712 in the course of the Great Northern War, ceded Bremen-Verden to their ally Great Britain-Hanover for Rtlr 600,000, which in 1719 again compensated Sweden with Speziestaler 1,000,000 for its loss, thus gaining the Swedish consent. British-Hanoverian Bremen-Verden retained the Neuenwalde Bailiwick as a rather administrative subdivision, but reorganised it according to the Hanoverian Bailiwick Ordinance (Amtsordnung) of 1674.

During the short-lived Westphalian annexation (1810) the territory of the Neuenwalde Bailiwick formed part of the Canton of Dorum within the Arrondissement of Bremervörde of the Department of the Elbe and Weser Mouth. The Canton of Dorum was established on 1 September 1810 and seated in Dorum. With effect of 1 January 1811 all the South Elbian German coast and its hinterland was annexed to France and the Canton of Dorum became part of the new Bremerlehe Arrondissement within the Bouches-du-Weser Department.

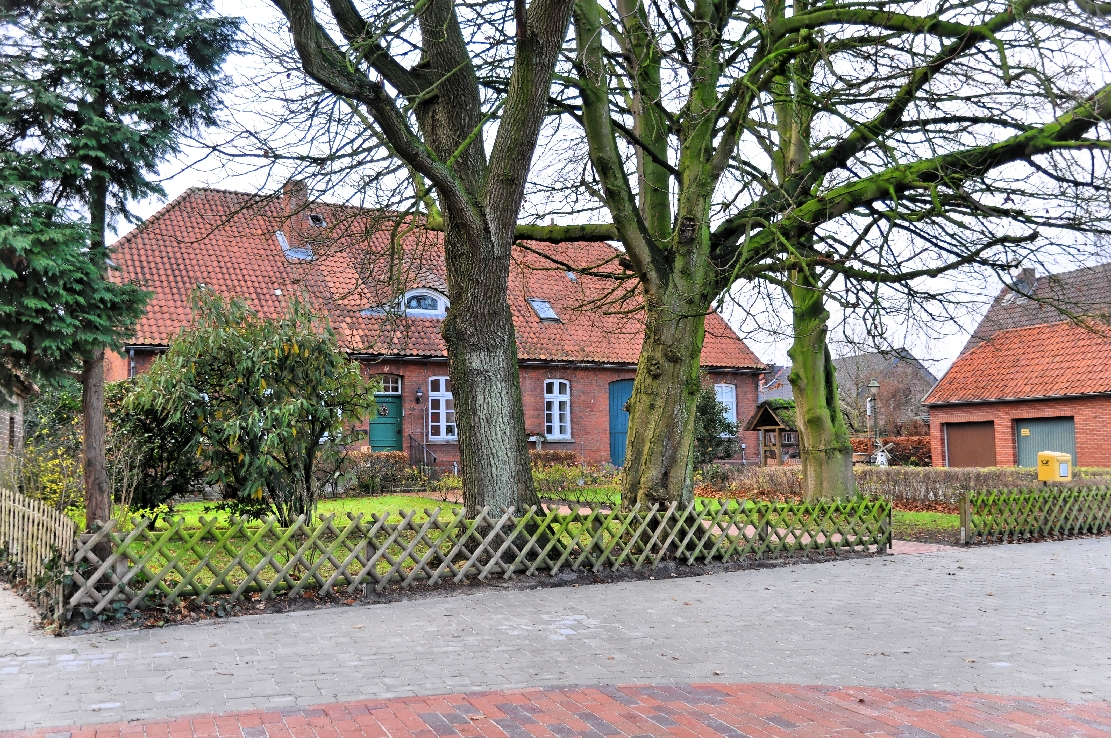
The former Amtshaus (bailiff's office), now the local museum, 2012

During the French occupation the Amtshaus (bailiff's office) burned down (later rebuilt). In 1813 after the French defeat the Neuenwalde Bailiwick was restored, and Bremen-Verden was reestablished too, however, all its grown local peculiarities in administration were levelled when this Hanoverian province became the High-Bailiwick of Stade in 1823. The Amt, having lost its seignorial character through the abolition of feudalism after 1832, became a merely administrative subdivision.

The convent's seigniorial jurisdiction comprised the Neuenwalde parish with Kransburg (hamlet), Krempel, Neuenwalde proper, the Neumühlen farm as well as Wanhöden and the Altenwalde windmill (the latter both part of the Altenwalde parish). The civilian jurisprudence was with the Neuenwalde bailiff, whereas to the criminal jurisdiction the relatively small Neuenwalde Bailiwick formed part of the precinct of the Bederkesa Bailiwick. On 1 January 1843 the Neuenwalde Bailiwick, in its jurisdictional function, merged into the Bederkesa Bailiwick. In 1852 the Neuenwalde Bailiwick, in its administrative function, was merged in the Bederkesa Bailiwick too, which again in 1859 was itself merged into the Lehe Bailiwick.

==== Amtleute / bailiffs ====
The Amt Neuenwalde was presided over by the Amtmann (pl. Amtleute; bailiff), later also granted other titles such as Drost (bailiff), Oberamtmann (superior bailiff). The bailiff replaced at times the provost.

- Bernhard Gogreve (Gogräfe): 1592–1593, appointed by the Administrator regnant of the prince-archbishopric
- Heinrich von Cappeln (Bremen, 10 July 1554 – 10 May 1623): 1606–1611; also 1586–1606 Amtmann in Neuhaus upon Oste, appointed by the Administrator regnant of the prince-archbishopric

===== Convent administrators appointed by the directors =====
- Mr. Meier: by 1684
- Mr. Bremer: by 1689
- Mr. Ottens
- Mr. von Schwanewede
- Conrad David Gerhard Kühlbrunn: by 1758, and 1761
- W. von Hartwig: by 1816
- L. Dallmann: 1830s
- Mr. Sievers: by 1876

== Conventuals ==
In 2012 there were five conventuals living in Neuenwalde. A list of conventuals who lived in Neuenwalde between 1685 and 1758 was delivered by Pratje. In the nineteenth century the French term chanoinesse (i.e. canoness) was widely used to denote the conventuals. Before their decline in the mid-fourteenth century again and again daughters of the Knights of Bederkesa entered the nunnery.

- 2013, conventuals: Frau Brauns, Christa Kraemer
- 2012, death: Ingeborg Maria von Troilo (Forst in Lusatia, 21 September 1924—18 November 2012, Langen)
- 2012, death: Dr. Thora-Elisabeth von der Decken (1921–2012)
- 2007, elected prioress: Veronika von der Decken
- 2000, conventuals: two only
- 1997, death: Gisela von Wersebe (22 December 1900—6 September 1997)
- 1951, death: Elisabeth Hermine Luise von Wersebe (Meyenburg in Osterstade, *7 January 1871—8 October 1951*, Neuenwalde)
- 1930s, about: Annemarie von Gröning (daughter of Countess Margarete von Schlieben [1870-1954] and Stephan von Gröning [1861-1944])
- 1935, death: Margarethe Ottilie Alma von Wersebe (Meyenburg in Osterstade, *2 April 1866—21 September 1935*, Neuenwalde)
- 1930, death: Friederike Helene Josephine Christiane von Wersebe (Meyenburg in Osterstade, *12 June 1860—14 May 1930*, Neuenwalde)
- 1922, death: Hildur Freiin Marschalck von Bachtenbrock (Aurich, *17 August 1842—25 January 1922*, Salzdetfurth)
- 1912 and after: Viktoria Elisabeth von Holleuffer
- 1891, admitted: Luise von Borries (Dorum, 10 May 1807—1 February 1897, Celle)
- 1890, death: Anna von Marschalck (27 December 1837—21 February 1890)
- 1890, death: Louise von Holleuffer (5 November 1803—20 February 1890)
- mid-nineteenth century: Miss Frese (daughter of an East Frisian member of the Hanoverian Estates Assembly)
- 1840, 15 conventuals and one prioress
- 1836, admitted: Elisabeth Gertrud Eleonore von Borries (Dorum, 19 October 1803—23 January 1887, Neuenwalde)
- 1819, admitted: Hermine Luise Ferdinande von Düring (died at Bothmer Mühle on 6 January 1830), daughter of Friedrich Ernst von Düring and Christiane von Dudden
- 1791, admitted: Miss von Wersebe (Cassebruch line)
- 1750s, admitted: Miss von Göben
- 1701, admitted: Augusta Hedwig von Düring (Horneburg, 24 June 1669 baptism, died on 10 December 1715*, Bremen), daughter of Arp von Düring (1630–1687) and Maria Sylluke von Brobergen (died 18 December 1674)
- 1690, death: Gerdrut von der Lieth, daughter of Christoph von der Lieth
- 1658, death: Maria Magdalena Fresen
- 1576, mentioned: Katharine Lammers
