= Holy Cross Church (Neuenwalde Convent) =

- German: Heilig-Kreuz-Kirche; N. Low Saxon: Hilligkrüüzkark
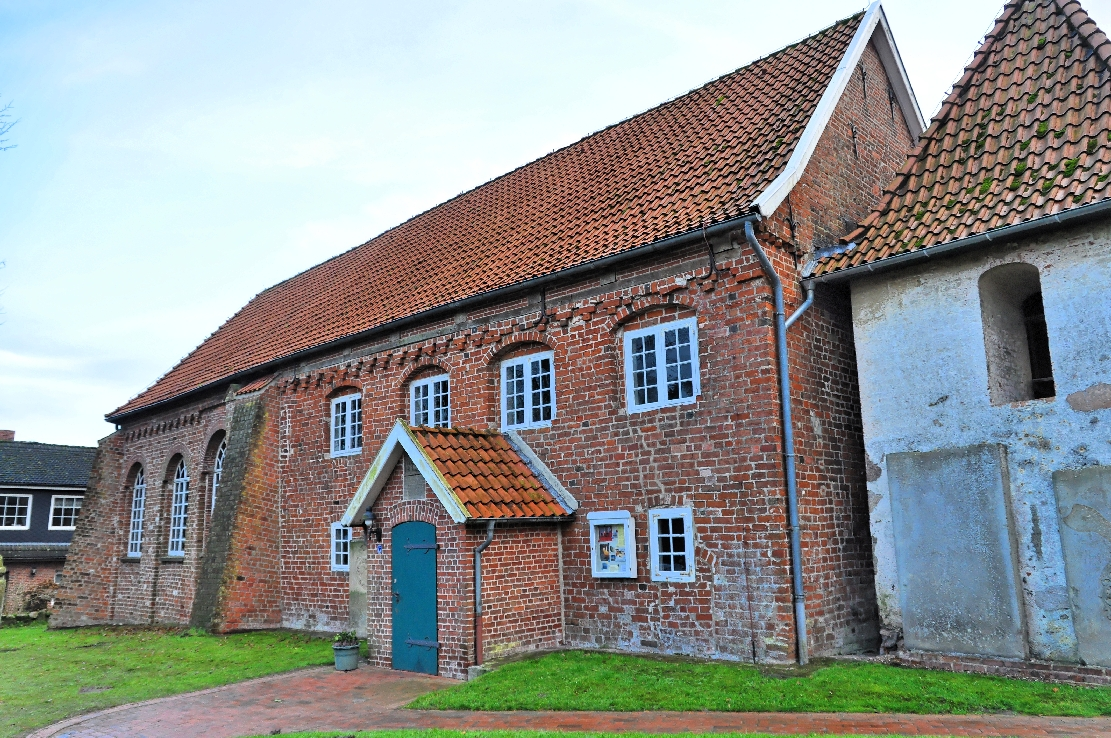
- Holy Cross Church, northern façade with the tower (truncated)

- Location within Lower Saxony Location within Germany
- 53°40′34″N 08°41′30″E
- Location: Neuenwalde, Geestland
- Country: Germany
- Denomination: Lutheran
- Previous denomination: Catholic
- Website: Holy Cross Church(in German); Neuenwalde Church(in German)

History
- Status: parish church
- Founder: Neuenwalde Convent
- Dedication: Holy Cross

Architecture
- Functional status: active
- Architectural type: aisleless church quire oriented
- Style: Gothic; Baroque (interior)
- Groundbreaking: 1330s 1910 (eastern extension)
- Completed: by 1400 by 1508 (after 1st fire) by 1636 (after 2nd fire)

Specifications
- Materials: brick

Administration
- Deanery: Wesermünde Deanery
- Parish: Neuenwalde Congregation (Kirchengemeinde Neuenwalde)

Clergy
- Pastor: Joachim Köhler

The Holy Cross Church (N. Low Saxon: Hilligkrüüzkark; German: Heilig-Kreuz-Kirche, more formal also: Kirche zum Heiligen Kreuz) is the church of the Neuenwalde Convent. Convent and Holy Cross Church are owned by the Bremian Knighthood, based in Stade. However, church and parsonage (also part of the Convent property), are used per usufruct by the Lutheran Neuenwalde Congregation in Neuenwalde, a locality of Geestland, Lower Saxony, Germany. Besides the Holy Cross Church, only used, the congregation uses and owns the chapel in Hymendorf.

== History ==
After the Convent had moved from Wolde, present Altenwalde, new church and convent buildings were erected on a land spit in the midst of fens at the brink of the Wesermünde Geest, presently known as Neuenwalde. The church adopted its naming from the Holy Cross, a relic of which remained in the incorporated Chapel of the Holy Cross and St. Willehadus on the Mount (i.e. hill; est. 13th century, abandoned between 1590 and 1629) in Altenwalde. Since 1181, and on until 1648, the area formed part of the Prince-Archbishopric of Bremen. Neuenwalde was made a parish of its own and its precinct was redistricted from that of the St. Dionysius parish in Debstedt. The convent Church of the Holy Cross thus simultaneously served as parish church for the Neuenwalders.

On 30 November 1390 the convent received a papal indulgence, presumably for repairs to the Holy Cross Church. In 1400 Prince-Archbishop Otto II granted an indulgence of forty days to all who aided with new constructions with the Holy Cross Church. In 1428 Prince-Archbishop Nicholas renewed the convent's privilege of granting indulgences both for visiting the Holy Cross Church on certain feast days as well as for material aid in building and decorating it.

On 26 December 1499 the Wursten Frisians had defeated the Great or Black Guard in Weddewarden, hired by Hadeln's Regent Magnus, the heir apparent of Saxe-Lauenburg to subject them. On New Year's Day 1500, the surviving mercenaries — trekking on towards Saxe-Lauenburgian Hadeln — ravaged and plundered the nunnery, before burning it to ashes. Choirbooks, documents, tapestries, chasubles, and paraments were lost in the fire. In 1503 the papal legate, Cardinal Raymond Peraudi, granted the convent an indulgence-privilege allowing for the reconstruction of the cloister.

In 1584 the first Lutheran pastor is recorded for the Holy Cross Church. Since the preachers were to be appointed in consensus with the prioress, the employment of a Lutheran pastor indicates the conversion of most Neuenwalde nuns to Lutheranism by then. With their advowson the prioresses blocked the intention of Bremen's Bederkesa bailiffs (the Bailiwick of Bederkesa [Amt Bederkesa] being between 1381/1421 and 1654 under the city's rule) to install Reformed preachers, unlike in Bederkesa proper, Debstedt, Flögeln, Holßel, Lehe, and Ringstedt (St. Fabian Church, Ringstedt) where the conversion then succeeded.

On 6 June 1629 playing children caused a fire, destroying the Holy Cross Church and all the convent buildings. The reconstruction started right away. The Holy Cross Church was restored between 1630 and 1634 with most of its interior dating back to the following decades. During the Catholic Leaguist and Imperialist occupation of the Bremen prince-archbishopric, on 17/27 July 1630^{O.S./N.S.} church and convent, still under reconstruction, were conveyanced to Roman Catholic Jesuits, as provided by the Edict of Restitution. However, this did not last for long but until the second half of April 1632, after the Swedish victory in the Battle of Rain, the Imperialist and Leaguist occupiers left the prince-archbishopric again and with them the foreign Catholic clergy.

== Church building ==
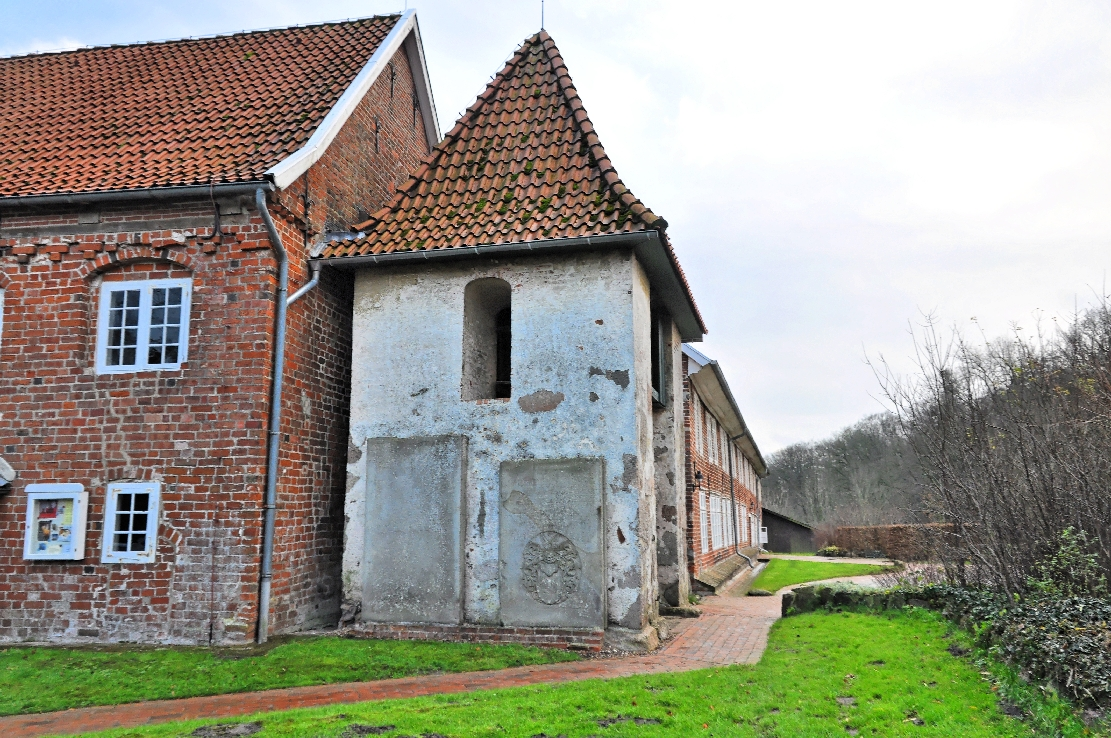
Tower with Holy Cross Church (left) and Altes Kloster convent building (right)

The Holy Cross Church was started in 1334 and its erection and embellishment lasted quite some time as shown by the indulgences granted to further its construction and decoration. The tower, like the church proper, based on erratic boulders, stands west of the church, but separately, and its western façade forms a building sightline with the southerly adjacent but structurally unconnected convent building called the Altes Kloster.

Today's church building, covering 241.187 square metres (2,596.12 sq ft), is divided from west to east into eight bays. The six older, westerly bays are built from brick in Klosterformat (height: 90 to 100 mm [3.5 to 3.9 in], length: 280 to 300 mm [11 to 12 in], and width: 130 to 140 mm [5.1 to 5.5 in]) which is why the western part of the church is dated to the 1330s. Also the structure of the individual bricks and the alternating but irregular bonding of headers and stretchers there speaks for this dating. Since the 15th century bricklaying usually followed regular bondings.

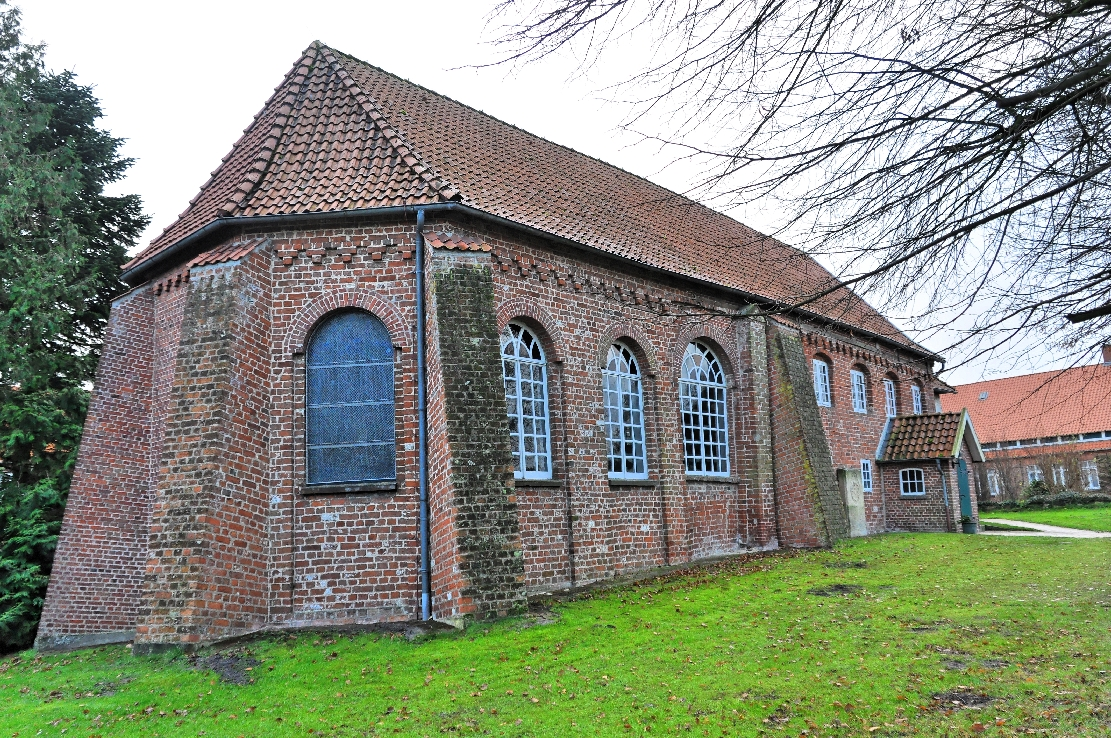
Seen from North East with the older six western bays, and the newer two eastern bays and the quire of 1910 with stained glass window

After the fires of 1500 and 1629 the church had been reconstructed either times using the surviving outside brickwork structures. Stefan Amt's constructional examinations in 2005 – during the renovation – revealed that the present building is no completely new construction but only the present roof and interior date to the repair after 1630. However, today's ceiling is flat, the original vaults have not been reconstructed. As of 1634 the convent's new Provost Otto Asche(n) Frese looked after the reconstruction. By 1636 the major structure was restored. The completion and decoration of the interior extended until the end of the 17th century.

Since the mid-19th century congregation (user) and knighthood (owner) negotiated about an extension of the church building since not all churchgoers could be seated. In the second half of the 19th century the windows of the sixth bay were replaced by higher and wider ones. In 1888 on the instigation of Prioress von Düring these large windows were adorned with coloured glass.

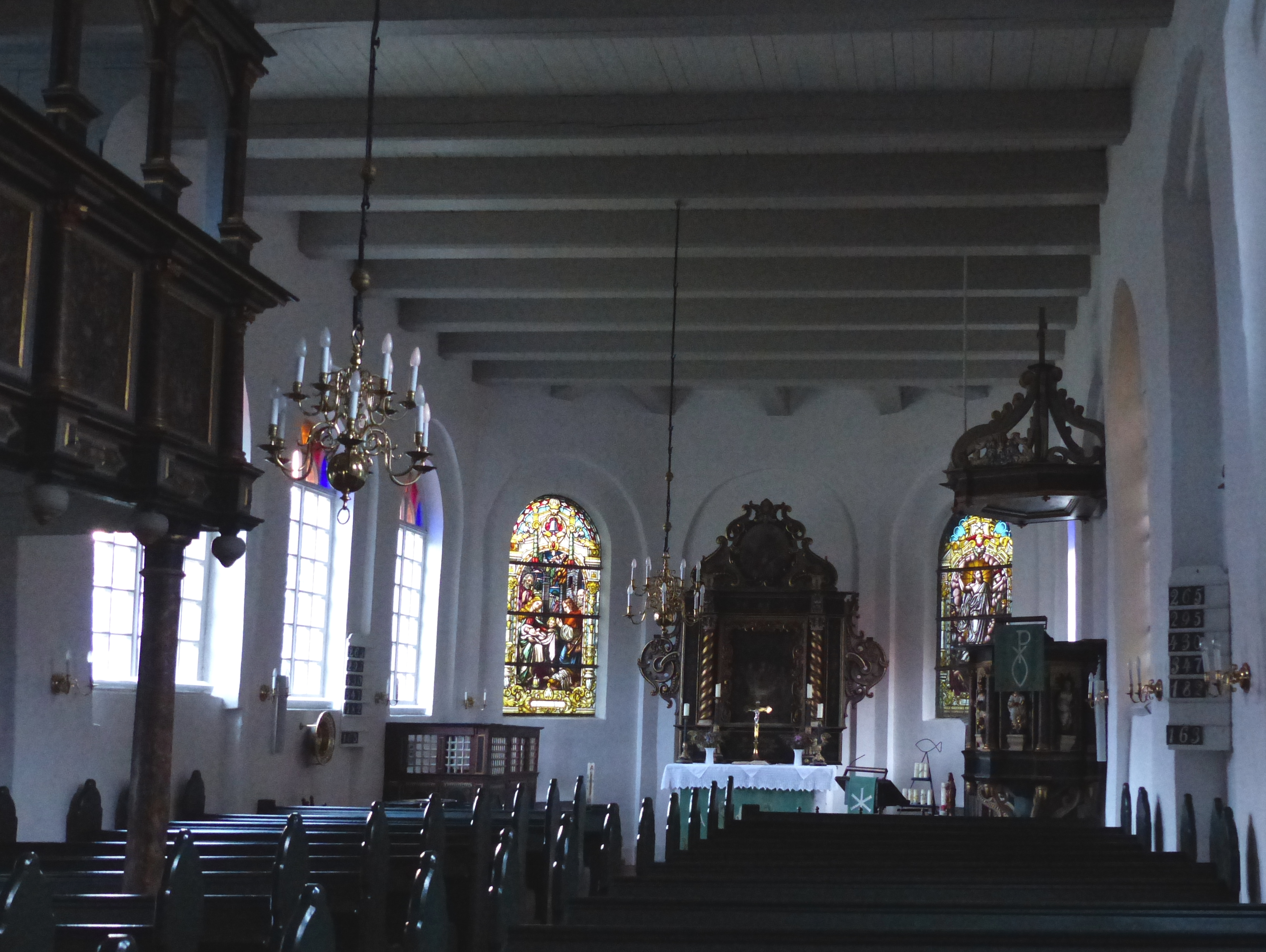
Look eastwards through the church with northern Prieche, altar, two Jugendstil windows and pulpit.

The position of quire and altar in Catholic times is indicated by bricked-up tabernacle niches (Sakramentsnischen) in the northern and southern walls of the sixth, originally last bay before the quire. In 1910 the old quire was demolished to give way for an eastward extension of the church by 5.5 metres (18 ft) or two bays ending in an obtuse three-sided new quire. The new northeastern façade was partially built with brick in Klosterformat gained from the rubble of the demolished old quire. Maybe also on this occasion the former bridged passage between the Altes Kloster convent building and the western loft in the church, with the bricked-up door in the first southern bay on first-floor level, was removed, at least the filling bricks laid are the same as those used for the eastern extension.

Between 2003 and 2005 the Bremian Knighthood – supported by the congregation, the deanery, the Church of Hanover, the European Union and the Marion-Köser-Stiftung foundation – thoroughly renovated the church. In 2009 a board displaying the escutcheons of the 20 member families of today's Bremian Knighthood was hung east of the loft on the northern wall in the church.

=== Furnishings ===
From the late 14th century one chalice remains. The chalice is silver traced with gold. Also a paten in the same style and from the same time has been preserved. Today both are shown together with the deed of foundation of convent and church in the Schwedenspeicher-Museum, Stade.

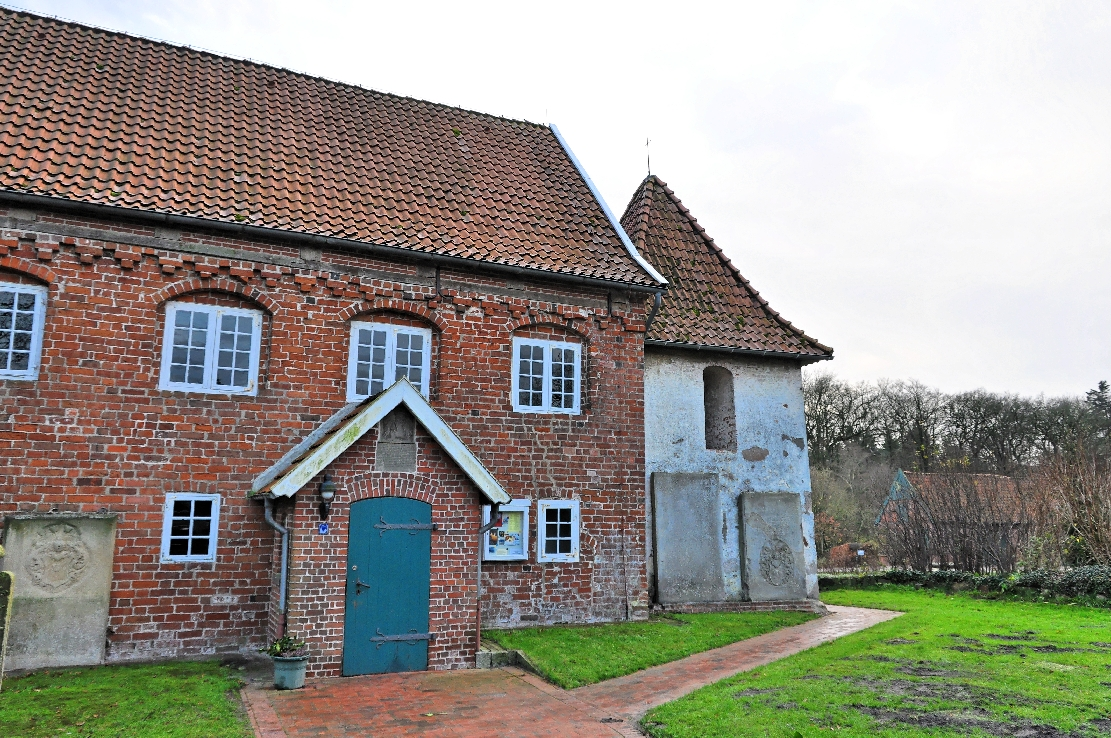
Northern entrance with the 1508-dated slab of Provost Minstedt, on the outside walls more slabs, to the right the white tower

In the gable above the northern entrance, located at the second western bay, there is the wall-mounted sandstone slab for Provost Nikolaus Minstedt the Elder (Mynstede), who died in 1508. This late Gothic epitaph displays him kneeling his hands lifted in prayer underneath the crucified Jesus Christ flanked by John the Baptist and Mary, mother of Jesus. The text in minuscule letters at the slab's bottom describes the provost's beneficial work for the Neuenwalde Convent.

There are two Priechen, structurally separate ground-level or elevated loges typical for Northern German church interiors once used to seat prominent persons such as pastors or feudal lords. Both are at grade and presently located at the walls of the 1910 extension. The northern one is named the Amtmannsstuhl (bailiff's seat), the southern named the Pfarrstuhl (pastor's seat, behind the pulpit), both dating from to the first half of the 17th century. The baptismal font of 1664 displays the coat of arms of Justino von Heshausen. The pulpit was created in the 17th century too.

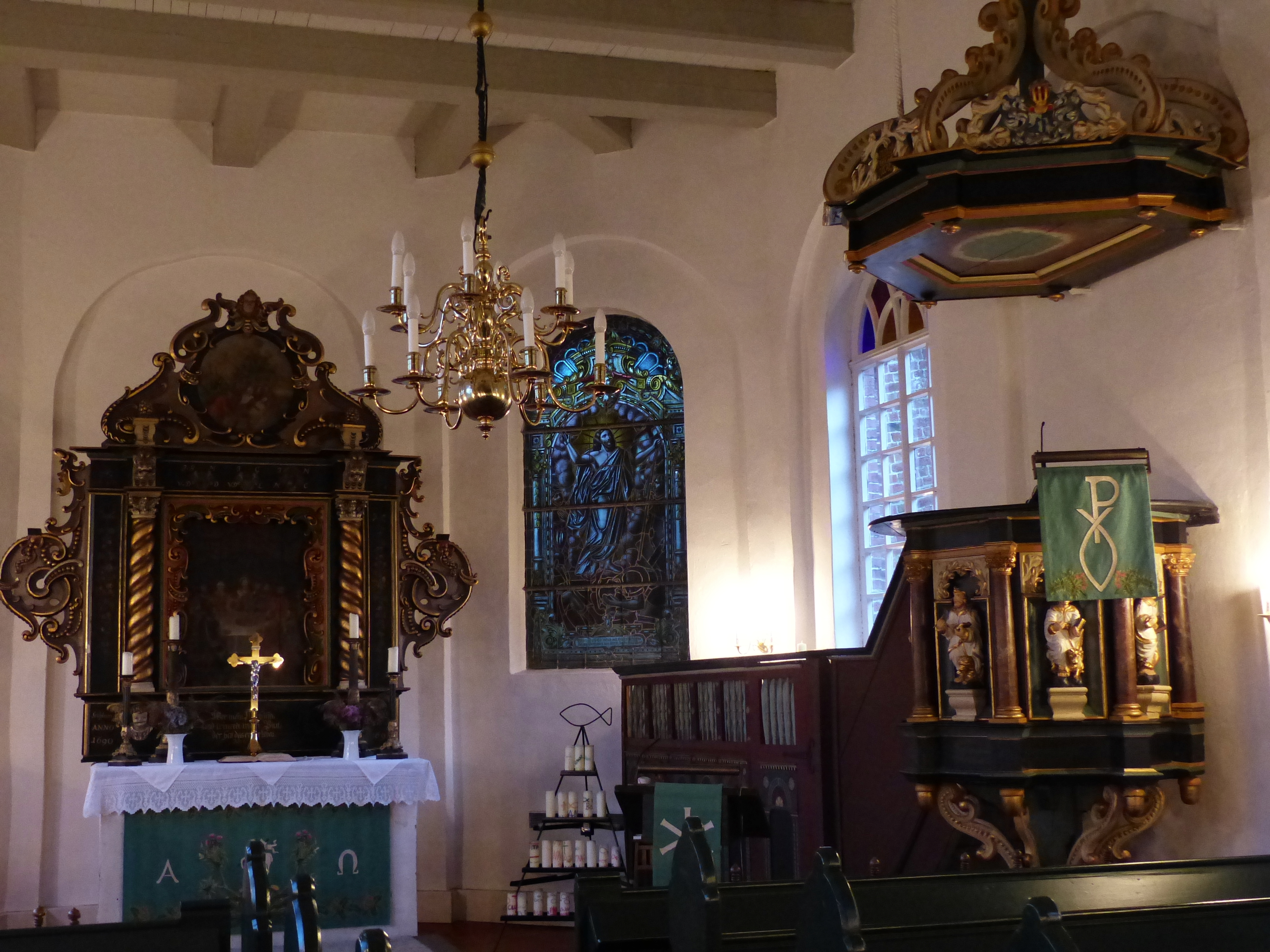
Altar, Jugendstil window, pulpit and southern Prieche.

The altar was created in 1690. The painter Nikolaus Bernütz from Hamburg decorated the altar until 1693. The central altarpiece, framed by decorative wood carvings, shows an oil painting of the Lord's Supper. In the altar's upper section, above the carved columns, there is an oil painting depicting the burial of Jesus within a medaillon surrounded by wood carvings.

Today's L-shaped western organ loft, was decorated in 1695 also by Bernütz. In 1979 Dieter Eckstein dendrochronologically dated five beams carrying the present loft to have been logged by or after 1633. In the same position, then spreading over the three western bays, used to be the nuns' loft (Nonnenempore), however, 45 centimetres (18 in) lower.

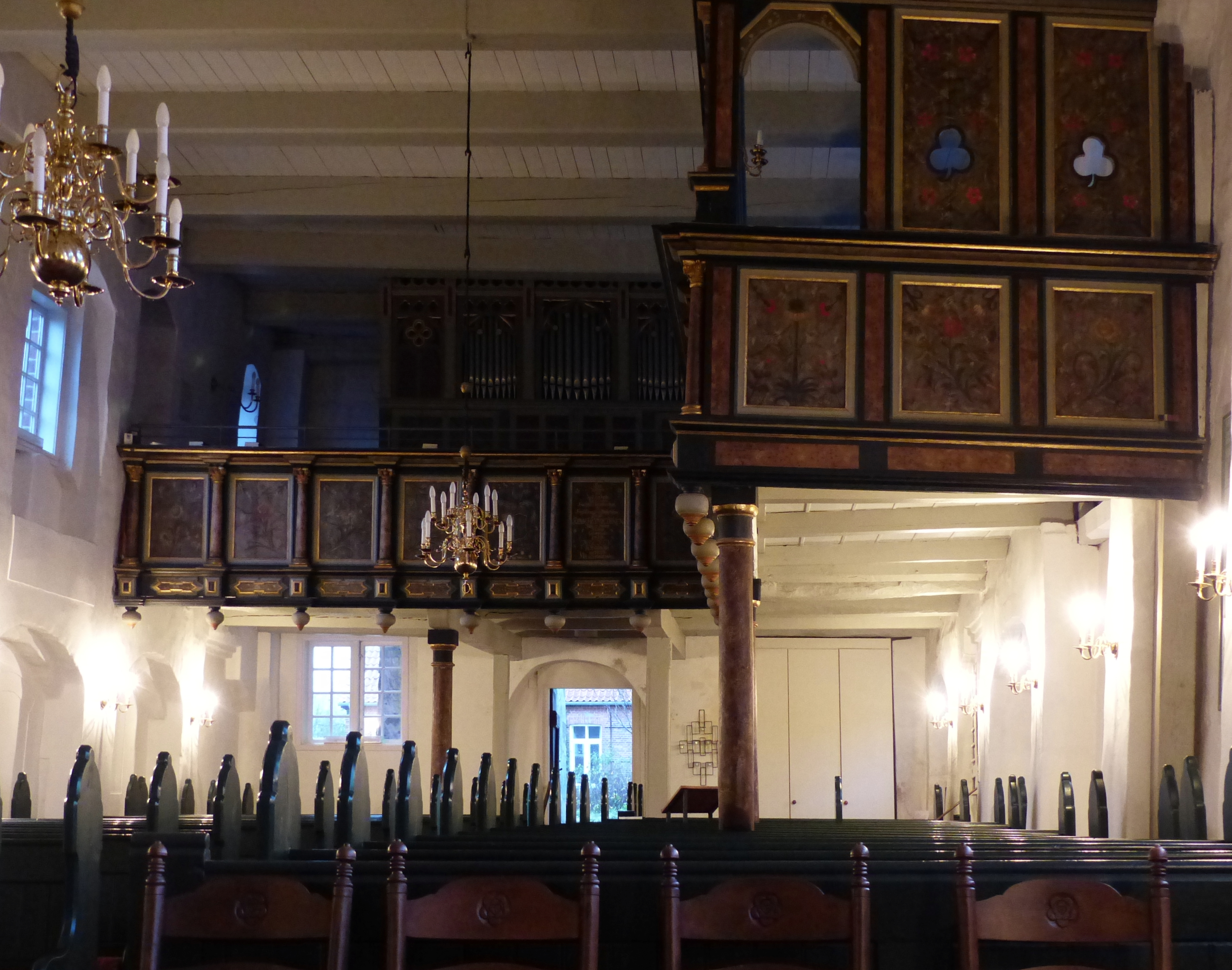
Present loft with organ and bricked-up passage to the Altes Kloster, underneath divided windows of the western bays

Since from the beginning the walls of the western three bays were built showing a two-floor structure with separate upper and lower windows, unlike the easterly following bays where this is reached by bricking up bigger window openings, the nuns' loft must have spanned over the three western bays. The nuns' loft used to be connected by a little bridge directly to the first floor of the Altes Kloster convent building where the conventuals have their apartments.

The Jugendstil windows in the 1910-built new quire were donations by the families von Bergen and von Glahn who grew wealthy in the United States of America. These stained glass windows display biblical scenes. The window left of the altar displays the Nativity of Jesus, the right one the Resurrection of Jesus at Easter.

=== Organ ===
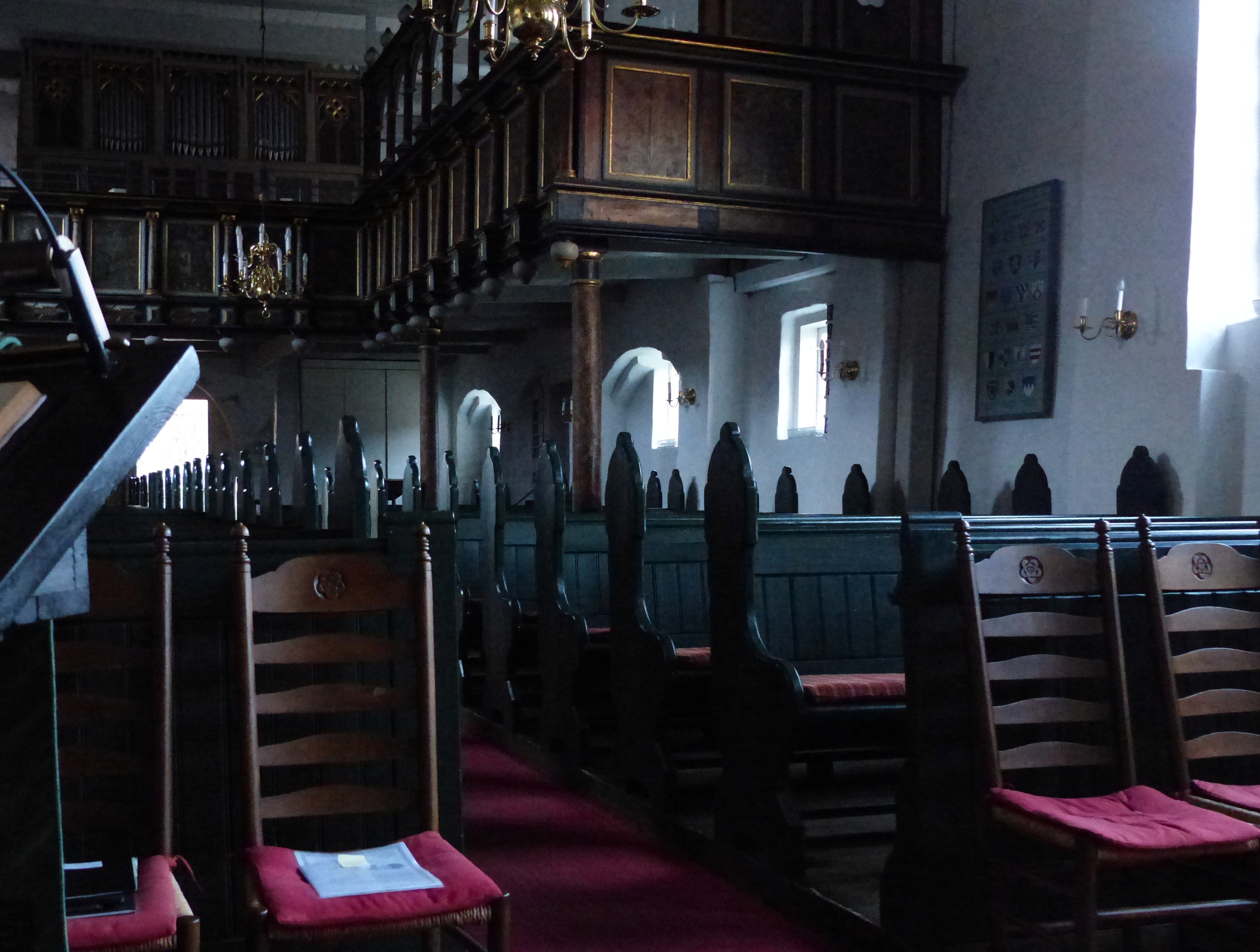
Loft with the organ and to the right the board with 20 escutcheons of Bremian Knighthood families

In 1887 Johann von Bergen, who had returned from his emigration in the United States as a wealthy man, donated mark (ℳ) 2,500 for an organ in his hometown church. Hinrich Röver from Stade was commissioned and the organ was the second work of his own, after he had left the organ workshop of his father and brother and opened his own organ workshop.

In 1917 the mute pipes in the casing front were requisitioned for war purposes. Thin wooden boards painted like pipes were then installed instead. In 1929 G. Wohlert from Lehe installed an electric wind system which is stationed in the bellows chamber in the church attic. In 1930 P. Furtwängler & Hammer, Leipzig, carried out a thorough cleaning and overhaul.

In 1983 Martin Haspelmath, Walsrode, restored the organ. On this occasion also the fake case front pipes were again replaced by real ones. The fake pipes are now stored in the bellows chamber in the church attic.

The organ includes pallets (valves) in the windchest and a mechanical tracker action built by Röver. The stop action is pneumatically operated. Since the organ had never been converted to Baroque style the casing, the pipe material and the technical premises are still completely original. The organ thus preserved its original riches of tone. In June and July 2007 Katrin Haspelmath cleaned and overhauled the organ and her company takes continuously care of the instrument.

==== Disposition of the organ ====
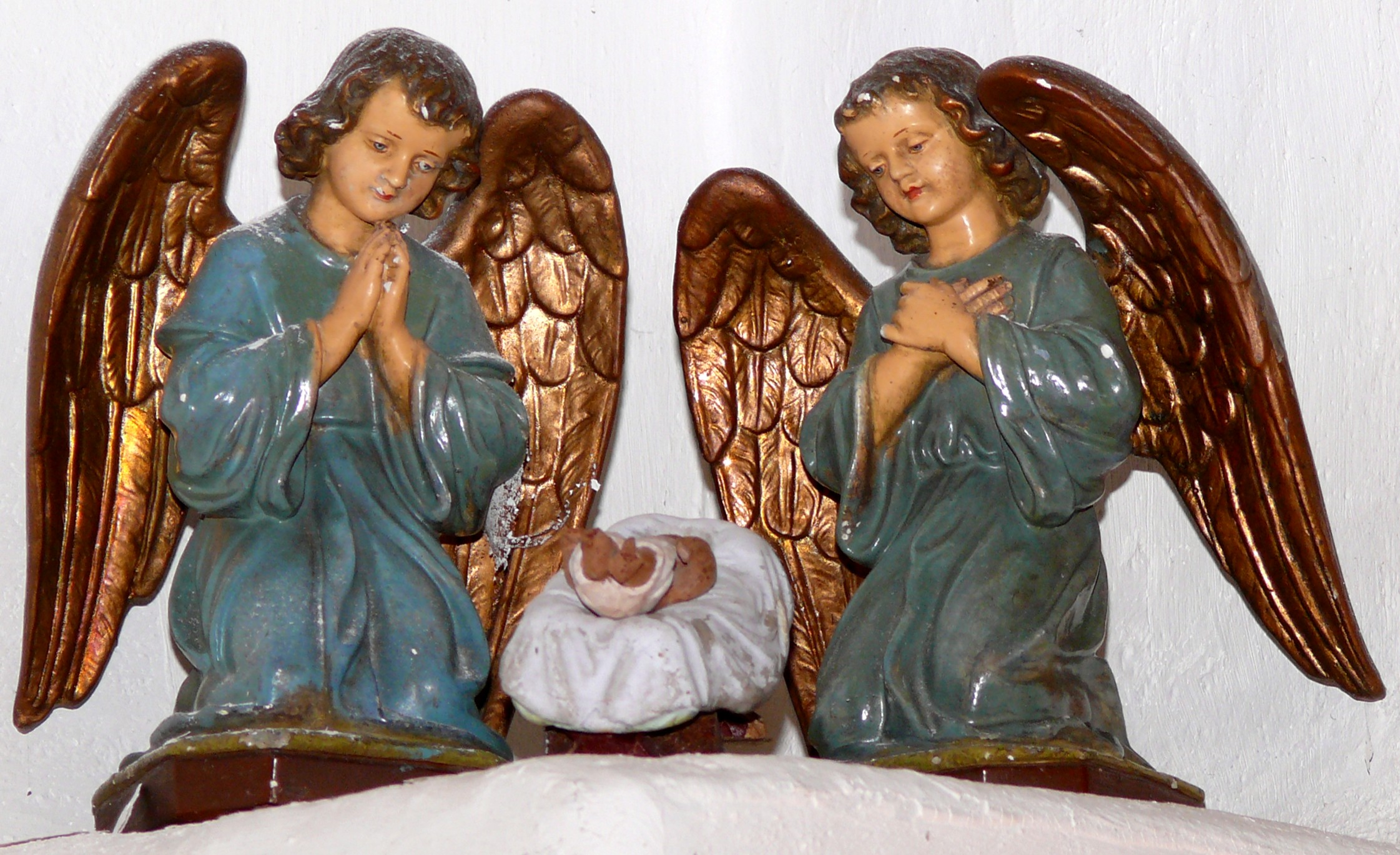
Figurines from the Nativity scene in the church.

The organ disposes of two manuals and a pedal with ten stops. Its tone is of equal temperament. The manuals range from C to F''', whereas the pedal ranges from C to d'.

Manual I
Principal	8'
Bordun	16'
Hohlflöte	8'
Octave	4'
Rauschquinte 2 fold

Manual II
Geigenprincipal	8'
Lieblich Gedeckt	8'
Spitzflöte	4'

Pedal
Subbaß	16'
Principalbaß	8'

== Hymendorf Chapel ==
Unlike the Holy Cross Church and the parsonage in Neuenwalde, both owned by the Bremian Knighthood, the chapel in Hymendorf, a village founded in 1829, is owned by the Neuenwalde Congregation. The chapel was originally a multi-purpose building used as the local school and place of worship. However, when in 1967 the local school closed the Neuenwalde Congregation acquired the building completely and adjusted it for its purposes.

== Parish ==
Today's parish precinct of the Neuenwalde Congregation comprises Neuenwalde proper, Krempel, two farmsteads in Holßel's fen settlement adjacent to Neuenwalde and Hymendorf. The Neuenwalde Congregation forms part of the Wesermünde Deanery within the Stade Diocese of the Church of Hanover.

Before the foundation of the Holy Cross Church the area of Neuenwalde formed part of the Debstedt parish. The priest of Debstadt objected the reduction of his revenues, which is why Neuenwalde's provost provided a one-off payment of Lübeck marks (M.lb.) 30 to that parish. Neuenwalde, like Debstedt, then (and until 1648) formed part of the Archdeaconry of Hadeln and Wursten, in personal union presided over by the dean of the Bremen Cathedral. Historically the Neuenwalde parish further included Wanhöden, presently part of the Good Shepherd congregation in Nordholz, and Kransburg, now belonging to the St. Pancras congregation in Midlum.

The Holy Cross Church was under the patronage right of the Neuenwalde Convent. The parish had to deliver a third of its revenues to the convent. The pilgrimage Chapel of Holy Cross and St. Willhadus on the Mount (i.e. hill) in Altenwalde also belonged to the convent. The transfer from Altenwalde to Neuenwalde in 1334 was combined with the incorporation of that chapel into the Holy Cross Church. In 1445 the Vicary of Saint Mary, in 1496 the Vicary of Saint Michael in the parish church of Ss. Cosmas and Damian in Altenwalde were incorporated into the Holy Cross Church. In the course of the Reformation, these incorporations were lost.

In 1648 the patronage to the Church was transferred from the convent to Bremen-Verden's monarch. The other estates and revenues of the convent were enfeoffed to the veteran and former Swedish Paymaster General Melchior Degingk (aka Degens; 1616–1683; later ennobled von Schlangenfel[d]t) as a fief heritable in the male line (Mannlehen).

== Theesberg Cemetery ==
Neuenwalde's new cemetery was opened in 1974 on the Theesberg hill. In 1983 the world war memorial, in 1922 donated by ex-Neuenwalders in the USA, was relocated from the fire station to the Theesberg cemetery.

== Pastors ==
The advowson at the Holy Cross Church was first with the convent's provost and later with its prioress. In 1683 the Bremian Knighthood claimed the advowson, including it in the monastic statute (Klosterordnung) royally confirmed in the same year, erroneously assuming the advowson had been with Degingk before. Thus the Knighthood elected Pastor Valentin Bothe in 1687. Bremen-Verden's general government protested this and by a declaratory action enforced its advowson.
