= Arensch =

Coordinates: 53°50′N 8°35′E

- Local area
- Country: Germany
- State: Lower Saxony
- Town: Cuxhaven

Arensch is a local part of Cuxhaven, a town in Lower Saxony, Germany.

== History ==
Arensch belonged to Land of Hadeln, and its local rulers were the heads of the Lappe family on the castles of Sahlenburg and Ritzebüttel. The Lappes conveyanced their feudal overlordship in Arensch, Berensch, Gudendorf, Holte and Oxstedt, together termed the heath villages (Heidedörfer), to the Convent in Wolde (later in Neuenwalde) after 1282. However, the seigniorial power remained with the Lappes.

In 1372 the Lappes pawned it to Hamburg which made the heath villages part of its territorial exclave, the Bailiwick of Ritzebüttel, in 1394 definitely superseding the Lappes. After 1571 Hamburg technically and de facto seized Neuenwalde's feudal privileges in Arensch and the other heath villages. Hamburg's bailiff of Ritzebüttel made the tenant farmers in the heath villages swear allegiance to the Senate of Hamburg.

After an occupation by France and an annexation by its ephemeric client state Kingdom of Westphalia in 1810, Arensch itself was annexed to France in 1811. In 1813 the Ritzebüttel Bailiwick was restored to Hamburg, whose sovereignty was restituted too. In 1937 Hamburg ceded the Ritzebüttel Bailiwick to the Stade Region within the Prussian Province of Hanover.

Between 1945 and 1964 various rocket attempts were accomplished in the proximity of Arensch. Thus the A4-Raketen of the Operation Backfire started in October 1945 of one in the Werner forest between Arensch and Sahlenburg established starting place, from which still some shelter remainders and a soil hollow were remaining. From 1957 to 1964 the Hermann-Oberth-Gesellschaft started; and some other experimenters in the proximity from Arensch of the building yard lain northwest and in the cotton wool before country numerous rockets with ceilings from up to 50 kilometers. The Seliger Forschungs- und Entwicklungsgesellschaft mbH accomplished further rocket attempts, with which ceilings were reached by up to over 100 kilometers, in the proximity of Berensch. In 1971 Arensch was incorporated into the city of Cuxhaven.
