= Neuenwalde =

- Ortsteil of Geestland
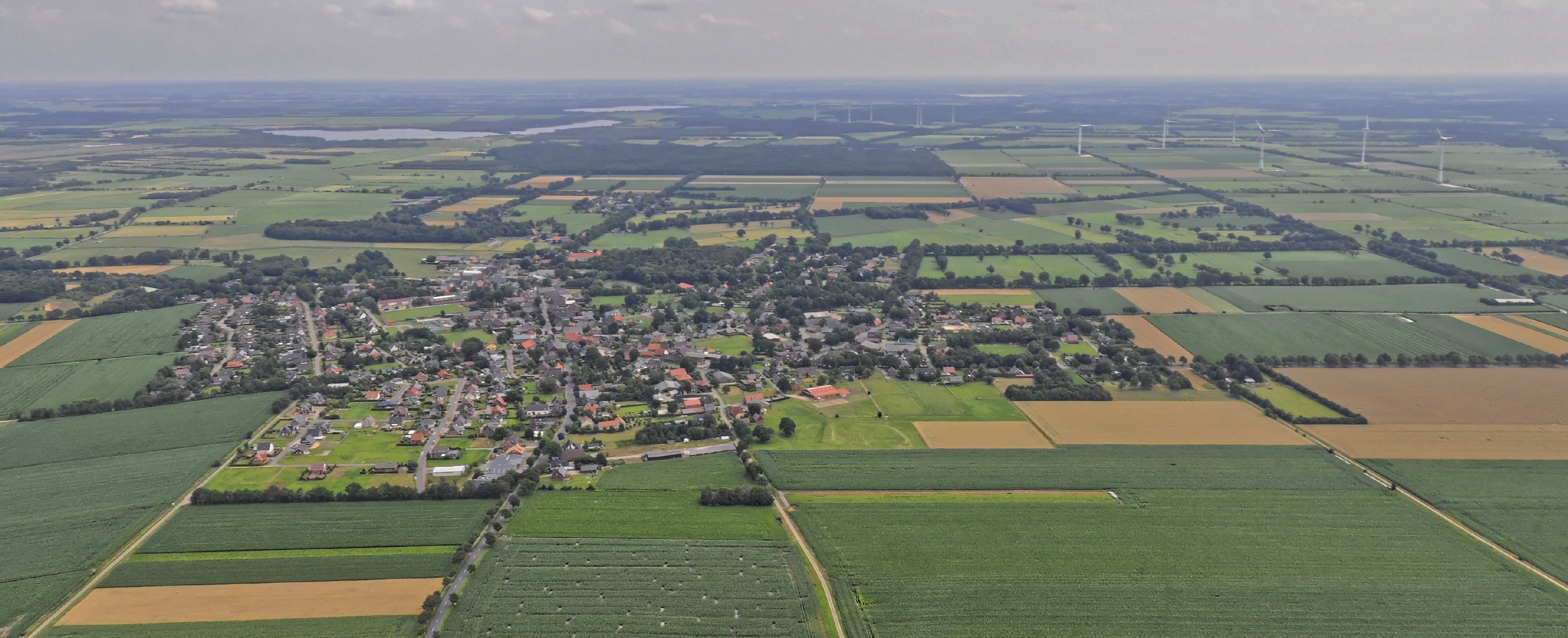
- Aerial view of Neuenwalde

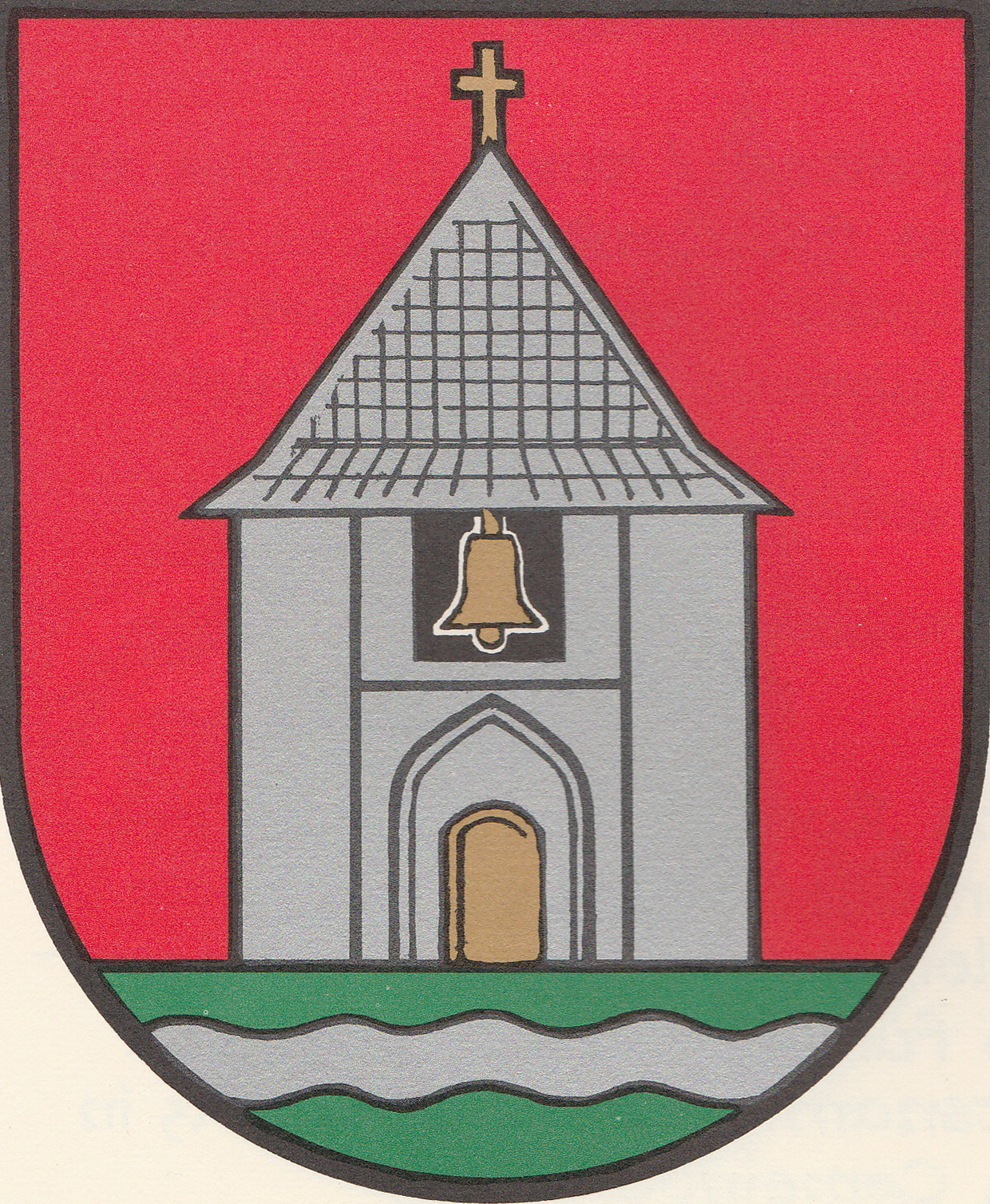
- Coat of arms
- Interactive map of Neuenwalde
- Location within Germany Location within Lower Saxony
- Coordinates: 53°40′40″N 08°40′40″E
- Country: Germany
- State: Lower Saxony
- District: Cuxhaven
- Town: Geestland

Area
  - Total: 32.14 km^{2} (12.41 sq mi)

Population (2017)
  - Total: 1,747
  - Density: 54.36/km^{2} (140.8/sq mi)
- Time zone: UTC+01:00 (CET)
  - Summer (DST): UTC+02:00 (CEST)
- Postal codes: 27607
- Dialling codes: 04707

Neuenwalde is a village in the municipality of Geestland in Lower Saxony.

The village is located northeast of Langen and between Bremerhaven and Cuxhaven.

Neuenwalde was first mentioned in 1334.
