= Sahlenburg =

Coordinates: 53°51′46″N 8°37′56″E

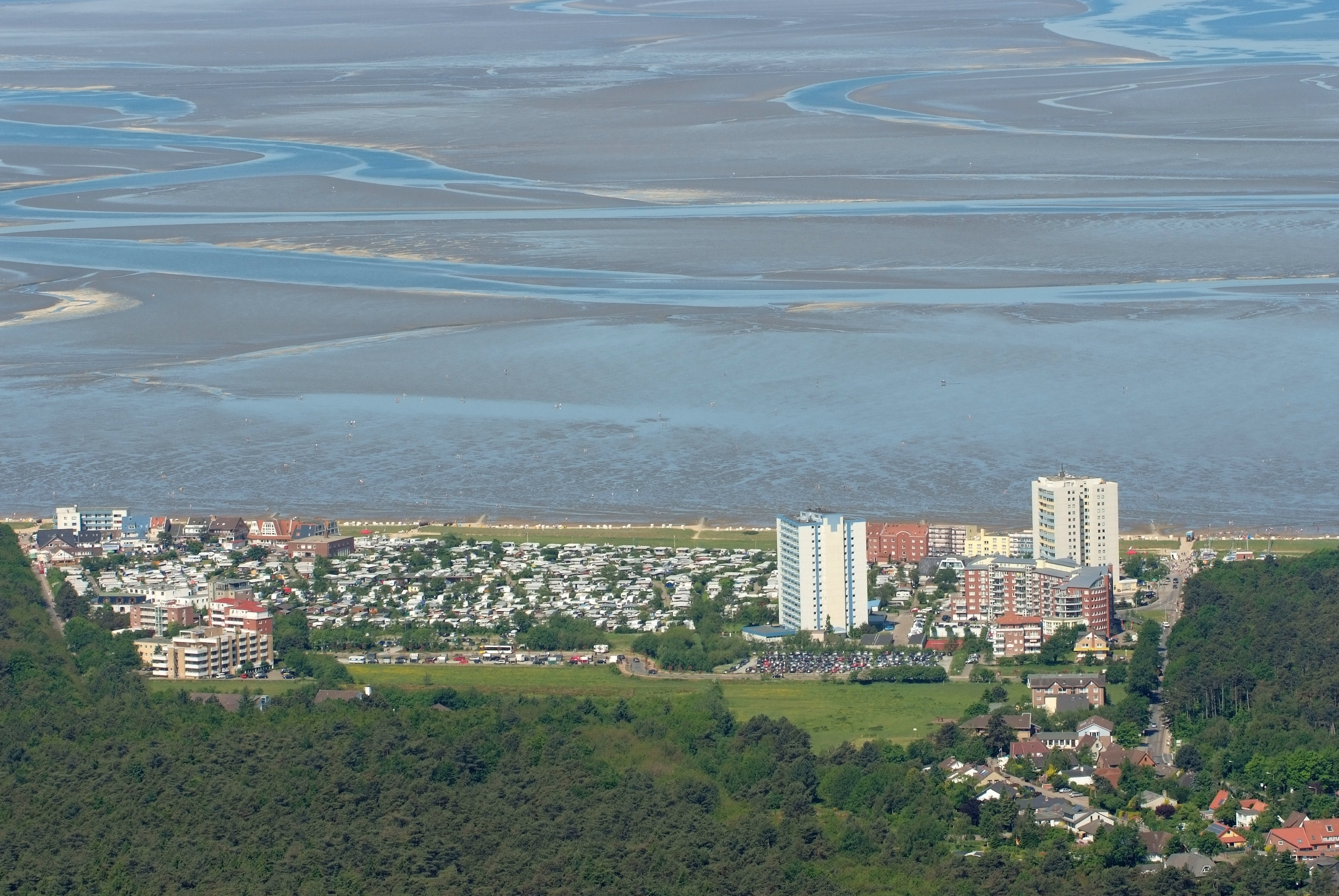
Aerial view of Sahlenburg (2012)

Sahlenburg is a borough of the city Cuxhaven near the mouth of the river Elbe in Lower Saxony, Germany. The Sahlenburg beach is popular with tourists. In addition to swimming in the sea when the tide permits, there are also walks into the Duhner and the Werner forests.

The earliest artifacts discovered are the flint tools of ice age hunters dated to c. 18,000 BCE. The first record of Sahlenburg is from 1325 and concerns Mr. von Lappe of noble lineage. Around 1400 the nobles moved into a stone castle in Cuxhaven. In 1871 Sahlenburg established its local council. In 1937, Sahlenburg became part of the Land of Hadeln and in 1970 became part of the city of Cuxhaven.
