= Wanhöden =

- Ortsteil of Wurster Nordseeküste
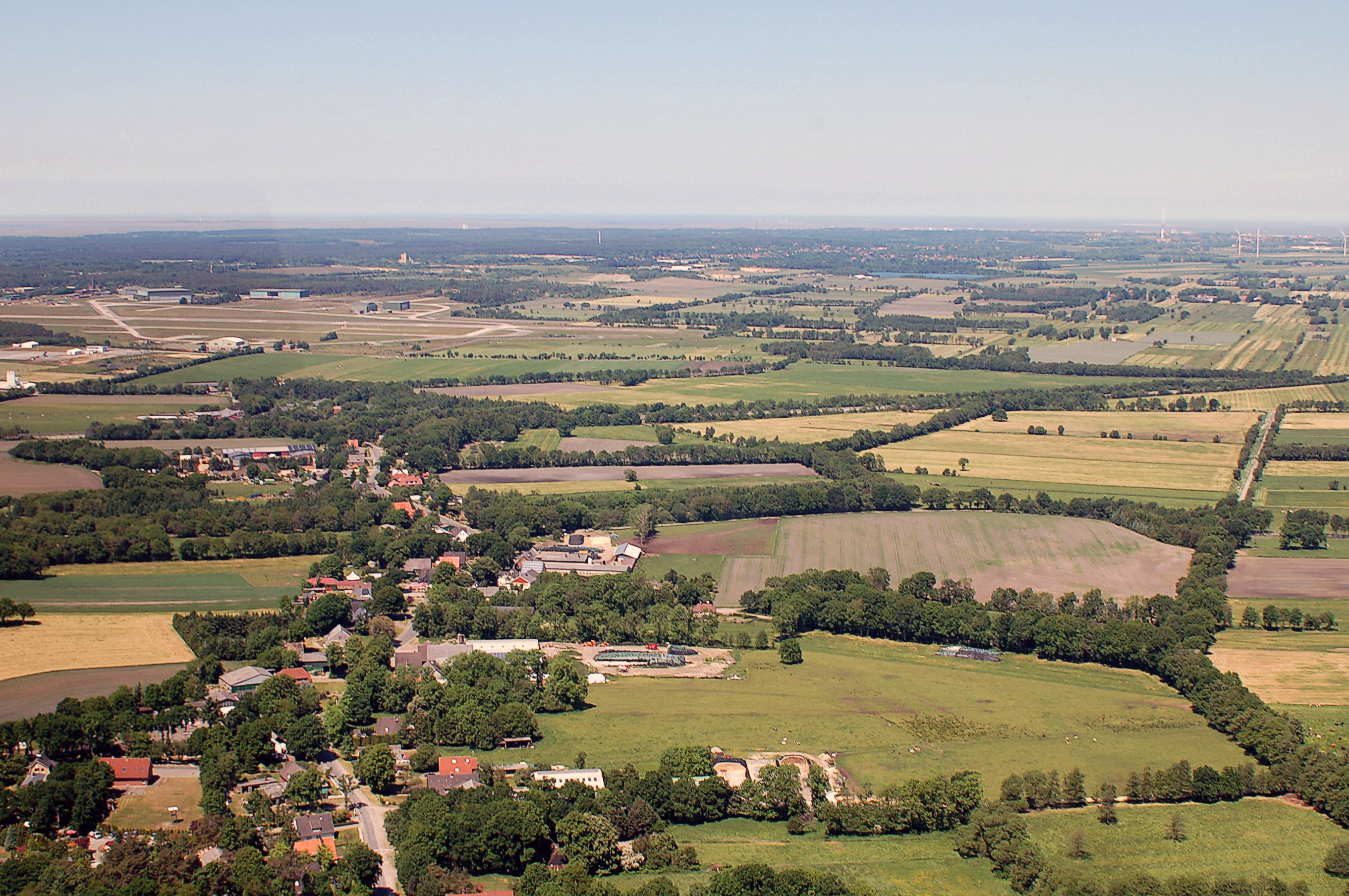
- Aerial view of Wanhöden

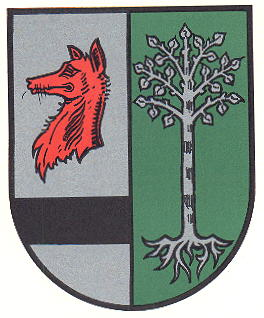
- Coat of arms
- Interactive map of Wanhöden
- Location within Germany Location within Lower Saxony
- Coordinates: 53°44′50″N 08°41′29″E
- Country: Germany
- State: Lower Saxony
- District: Cuxhaven
- Municipality: Wurster Nordseeküste

Area
  - Total: 8.83 km^{2} (3.41 sq mi)

Population (2017)
  - Total: 380
  - Density: 43/km^{2} (110/sq mi)
- Time zone: UTC+01:00 (CET)
  - Summer (DST): UTC+02:00 (CEST)
- Postal codes: 27637
- Dialling codes: 04741

Wanhöden is a village in the municipality of Wurster Nordseeküste in Lower Saxony.

The village was first mentioned in 1509, and in 2009, the village hosted a large celebration for its 500th birthday.

Since 2009, the music festival Deichbrand takes place at the airport near Wanhöden.
