= Oberth =

Oberth is a surname. Notable people with the surname include:

- Hermann Oberth (1894–1989), Austro-Hungarian born German physicist and engineer
  - Hermann-Oberth-Gesellschaft
  - Oberth (crater)
  - Hermann Oberth Space Travel Museum
  - Oberth effect (astrodynamics)
- Erna Roth Oberth (1923–2012), Transylvanian-German lawyer
- Christian Oberth (1953?–2012), video game programmer

== See also ==
- Obert, Nebraska
- Oberthal (disambiguation)
