= List of rocket experiments in the area of Cuxhaven =

Experimental rocket launches carried out in Cuxhaven, Germany from 1933-64

Coordinates: 53.82416°N 8.56075°E

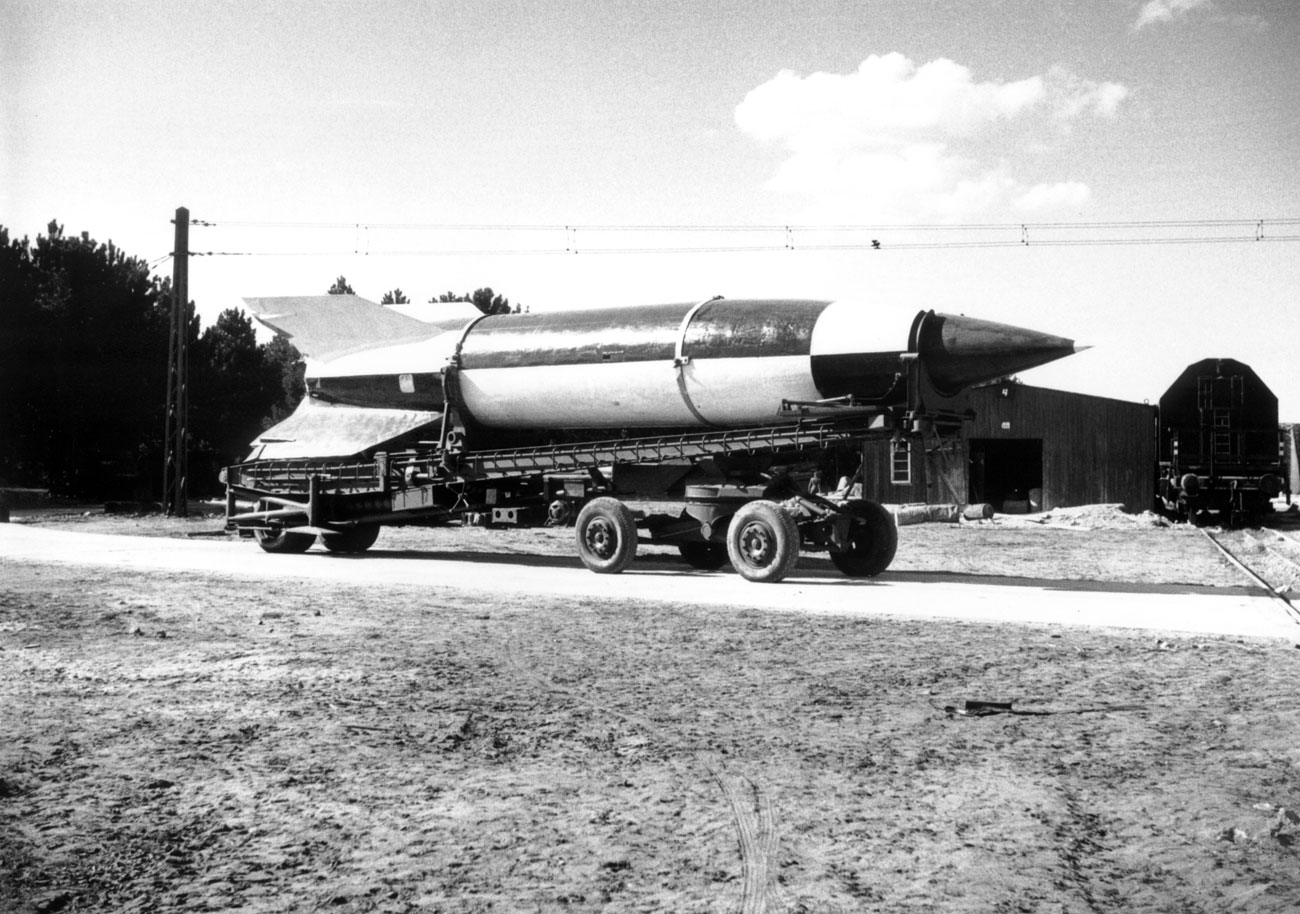
V-2 rocket being transported near Cuxhaven in 1945

Between 1933 and 1964 numerous rocket experiments were carried out in the area of Cuxhaven, Germany.

== 1930s and 1940s ==
- In April 1933 Gerhard Zucker launched a mail rocket, which was to fly from Duhnen to the island of Neuwerk, but which fell to Earth after flying a few meters.
- During World War II some test flights of Fi-103 (V1) rockets were flown from the military camp of Altenwalde. In 1945, Kurt Debus was ordered to install a launch pad for testing A4-rockets in the area of Cuxhaven, as a replacement for Stand VII in Peenemünde; however, the project could not be completed due to the military situation towards the end of the war. Nevertheless, in October 1945, these works supplied a basis for "Operation Backfire", a demonstration of three A4-rocket launches to military representatives of the Allied Occupation Forces. One launch pad and two concrete shelters were built for "Operation Backfire", near the road between Arensch and Sahlenburg, where some remnants still exist today.

== 1950s ==
- In 1952 in Hespenbusch, Karl Poggensee began to develop and launch small solid-propellant rockets. In the same year a Rocket/Technical Society was created, initially known as DAFRA, then as the German Rocket Society (Deutsche Raketengesellschaft) or DRG, and finally as the Hermann Oberth Society (Hermann-Oberth-Gesellschaft) or HOG.
- After a short time, this society built rockets with maximum altitudes of several kilometres, but the available area in Hespenbush was too small for their purpose, so a new launch area had to be found. On the recommendation of Cuxhaven town-councilor Geveke, who had worked during the war on the development of missiles, the coastal area of Cuxhaven was selected. This area was considered to be the most suitable, not only because of the "Operation Backfire" launches, but also because to the north and west of Cuxhaven was open sea, an ideal firing range.
- On August 24, 1957, the first rocket launches took place. Seven "oilspray" rockets with a range of 100 to 300 m were fired, followed by a launch of several small model rockets which reached up to 2 km of altitude. Then came a delta-winged rocket built by Koschmieder which reached 3 km. A prototype 20 kg meteorological rocket using a new solid propellant developed by Deutsche Dynamit AG produced 1500 kgf (15 kN), reaching a speed of Mach 1.5, and a height of 4 km. A test of the first of Ernst Mohr's large rockets had been planned, but was canceled due to bad weather.
- The launch point of these rockets was close to the building yard of Arensch. In contrast to "Operation Backfire", there was no firm launch pad, however the control post was installed in a former World War II German Navy shelter.
- On June 8, 1958, the first attempted launches of Ernst Mohr's large meteorological rockets were made. The rockets had been so far improved that they could, theoretically, reach heights of 50 km, but there were problems with flight stability, and each of the three rockets fell.
- On September 14, 1958, the first successful flights of Ernst Mohr's rockets took place, with the payload dart reaching a height of 50 km.
- On May 16, 1959, the first mail-rockets were launched. These rockets carried 5000 postcards over a distance of 3 km. The letters transported with these rockets received special stamps which are nowadays greatly coveted by philatelists. The mail-rocket launches were also used to finance the rocket experiments.
- On November 1, 1959, the first launch of a Kumulus rocket took place. It reached a height of 15 km, however the on-board transmitter failed.

== 1960s ==
- On February 11 and February 12, 1961, the first launches of Kumulus rockets with scientific experiments succeeded, and it was possible to follow their progress by radio-tracking.
- In May and June 1961, mail was transported with rockets, for the first time, over a larger distance from the mainland to the islands of Neuwerk and Scharhörn.
- On September 16, 1961, two Kumulus rockets transporting biological experiments were launched. On board one of these rockets was a salamander called Max, and on board the other there was a goldfish called Lotte. Lotte landed safely after the flight, while Max did not survive a hard landing caused by a parachute failure. On the same day the first flight of the sounding rockets Cirrus I and II took place. These rockets reached maximum altitudes of 35 and 50 km, respectively.
- In 1961, the rocket engineer Berthold Seliger founded his rocket construction company Berthold-Seliger-Forschungs- und Entwicklungsgesellschaft mbH, hereafter referred to as BSFEG, and began by launching his self-constructed rockets: the first rockets were only reproductions of the Kumulus, but on November 19, 1962, he launched his first self-developed rockets. These rockets were three single-stage rockets with a length of 3.4 m and a maximum altitude of 40 km. The signals from their on-board transmitters were received from the Bochum observatory. These rockets were completely re-usable, returning to earth after flight by parachute.
- On February 7, 1963, the first flight of Berthold Seliger's two-stage rocket took place. This 6 metre-long rocket reached an altitude of 80 km. Like its single-stage forerunner, its signals could be received at the Bochum observatory. Before it was launched, a single-stage BSFEG rocket was sent up to examine wind conditions in the upper atmosphere.
- On May 2, 1963, Berthold Seliger launched his self-developed three-stage rocket, which reached a maximum height of 110 km, using a reduced amount of propellant.
- From 1957 to 1963, all rocket experiments in the area of Cuxhaven had been purely civilian in nature: however, after their successes, BSFEG began developing rockets with military capability. On December 5, 1963, BSFEG gave a flight demonstration of their products to military representatives from non-NATO states. Although none of these rockets represented a ready for use weapon, and all landed by parachute after their flights, the maximum flight altitude of the rockets had been set to 30 m in conformance with Allied laws concerning the development of military rockets in Germany. Nevertheless, there were some diplomatic tensions, especially with the Soviet Union, which feared a development of military rockets in Germany, contrary to Allied regulations. These fears were not unreasonable: the rockets demonstrated on December 5, 1963, could reach as far as 160 km, if they were launched with the maximum amount of fuel.
- Despite these doubts, rocket launches in the area of Cuxhaven continued, and on March 22, 1964, HOG launched ten supply rockets, some of which glided down to a landing.
- On May 7, 1964, during a rocket demonstration by Gerhard Zucker in Braunlage, a deadly accident occurred as one of his mail rockets exploded shortly after its launch and debris fell into the crowd of spectators, who had been allowed too close to the launch pad. Although Gerhard Zucker was not a collaborator with either HOG or BSFEG, all rocket launches with flight altitudes of over 100 meters were forbidden in the area of Cuxhaven after this accident. In contrast to Gerhard Zucker's rockets, which had already caused problems several times before, there had never been any accidents or injuries connected with HOG or BSFEF rocket launches.

== See also ==
- Operation Backfire (WWII)
- Peenemünde Army Research Center
- Sounding rocket
- Mail rocket
- Rocket mail
- V-1 flying bomb
- History of rockets

== Literature ==
Sterne und Weltraum, 3/2005, Page 40 - 45 (in German)
