= 1963 in spaceflight (April–June) =

This is a list of spaceflights launched between March and June 1963. For launches between July and September, see 1963 in spaceflight (July-September). For an overview of the whole year, see 1963 in spaceflight.

== Orbital launches ==
- ← Jan
- Feb
- Mar
- Apr
- May
- Jun
- Jul
- Aug
- Sep
- Oct
- Nov
- Dec →

Date and time (UTC)	Rocket	Flight number	Launch site		LSP	
Date and time (UTC)	Payload (⚀ = CubeSat)	Operator	Orbit	Function	Decay (UTC)	Outcome
Date and time (UTC)	Remarks					
=== April ===
1 April; 23:01	(United States) Thor DM-21 Agena-D		(United States) Vandenberg LC-75-3-5		(United States) US Air Force	
1 April; 23:01	(United States) OPS 0720 (KH-4 20/9053)	US Air Force/NRO	Low Earth	Optical imaging	26 April	Successful
1 April; 23:01	(United States) SRV 609	US Air Force/NRO	Low Earth	Film return	5 April	Successful
2 April; 08:16:37	(Soviet Union) Molniya-L		(Soviet Union) Baikonur Site 1/5		(Soviet Union)	
2 April; 08:16:37	(Soviet Union) Luna 4		Highly elliptical	Lunar lander	In orbit	Spacecraft failure
2 April; 08:16:37	Spacecraft failed to perform course correction burn, resulting in failure to land.					
3 April; 02:00:02	(United States) Delta B	D017	(United States) Cape Canaveral LC-17A		(United States) US Air Force	
3 April; 02:00:02	(United States) Explorer 17 (AE-A/S6)	NASA	Low Earth	Atmospheric	24 November 1966	Successful
5 April; 23:01	(United States) Scout X-3		(United States) Vandenberg LC-D		(United States) US Air Force	
5 April; 23:01	(United States) Transit 5A-2	USN	Low Earth	Navigation	In orbit	Successful
6 April	(Soviet Union) Kosmos 63S1		(Soviet Union) Kapustin Yar Mayak-2		(Soviet Union)	
6 April	(Soviet Union) DS-P1 №2		Intended: Low Earth	Radar target Technology	6 April	Launch failure
6 April	First stage malfunction, failed to orbit.					
13 April; 11:00	(Soviet Union) Kosmos 63S1		(Soviet Union) Kapustin Yar Mayak-2		(Soviet Union)	
13 April; 11:00	(Soviet Union) Kosmos 14 (Omega №1)		Low Earth	Technology	29 August	Successful
22 April; 08:30	(Soviet Union) Vostok-2		(Soviet Union) Baikonur Site 1/5		(Soviet Union)	
22 April; 08:30	(Soviet Union) Kosmos 15 (Zenit-2 №8)		Low Earth	Optical imaging	27 April	Successful
26 April; 20:13	(United States) Thor DM-21 Agena-D		(United States) Vandenberg LC-75-1-1		(United States) US Air Force	
26 April; 20:13	(United States) OPS 1008 (KH-5 8/9055)	US Air Force/NRO	Low Earth	Optical imaging	26 April	Launch failure
26 April; 20:13	(United States) SRV 605	US Air Force/NRO	Low Earth	Film return	26 April	Launch failure
26 April; 20:13	Attitude control sensor misalignment resulted in failure to reach orbit.					
26 April	(United States) Scout X-2M		(United States) Point Arguello LC-D		(United States) US Air Force	
26 April	(United States) OPS 1298 (DSAP-1 F4/P-35 4/AF-4)	US Air Force	Intended: Low Earth	Weather	26 April	Launch failure
26 April	Final flight of Scout X-2M, failed to orbit.					
28 April; 08:50	(Soviet Union) Vostok-2		(Soviet Union) Baikonur Site 1/5		(Soviet Union)	
28 April; 08:50	(Soviet Union) Kosmos 16 (Zenit-2 №10)		Low Earth	Optical imaging	8 May	Partial spacecraft failure
28 April; 08:50	Attitude control system malfunctioned.					
← Jan; Feb; Mar; Apr; May; Jun; Jul; Aug; Sep; Oct; Nov; Dec →; === May ===
7 May; 11:38:03	(United States) Delta B	D018	(United States) Cape Canaveral LC-17B		(United States) US Air Force	
7 May; 11:38:03	(United States) Telstar 2	AT&T	Medium Earth	Communications	16 May 1965; 14:03	Successful
9 May; 20:06:16	(United States) Atlas LV-3A Agena-B		(United States) Point Arguello LC-1-2		(United States) US Air Force	
9 May; 20:06:16	(United States) MIDAS 7	US Air Force	Medium Earth	Missile defence	In orbit	Successful
9 May; 20:06:16	(United States) DASH 1	US Air Force	Medium Earth	Air density research	In orbit	Successful
9 May; 20:06:16	(United States) ERS-5 (TRS-2)	US Air Force	Medium Earth	Technology	11 November 2011	Successful
9 May; 20:06:16	(United States) ERS-6 (TRS 3)	US Air Force	Medium Earth	Technology	In orbit	Successful
9 May; 20:06:16	(United States) Westford-2	US Air Force	Medium Earth	Communications; Technology	In orbit	Successful
9 May; 20:06:16	First operational MIDAS satellite, first satellite to detect a missile launch from space, operated for six weeks. The Westford Needles project resulted in the first large collection of space debris.					
15 May; 13:04:13	(United States) Atlas LV-3B		(United States) Cape Canaveral LC-14		(United States) US Air Force	
15 May; 13:04:13	(United States) Mercury-Atlas 9	NASA	Low Earth	Biological; Technology	16 May; 23:24:02	Successful
15 May; 13:04:13	(United States) Balloon Subsatellite 2	NASA	Low Earth	Air density	16 May; 23:24:02	Spacecraft failure
15 May; 13:04:13	(United States) Flashing Light Unit	NASA	Low Earth	Technology	Unknown	Successful
15 May; 13:04:13	Crewed flight with astronaut Gordon Cooper, final flight of Atlas LV-3B and Mercury programme, Balloon Subsatellite failed to deploy.					
18 May; 22:21	(United States) Thrust Augmented Thor SLV-2A Agena-D		(United States) Vandenberg LC-75-3-5		(United States) US Air Force	
18 May; 22:21	(United States) OPS 0924 (KH-6 2/8002)	US Air Force/NRO	Low Earth	Optical imaging	27 May	Spacecraft failure
18 May; 22:21	(United States) SRV 613	US Air Force/NRO	Low Earth	Film return	May	Successful
18 May; 22:21	Film failed to feed into camera, no images returned.					
22 May; 03:00	(Soviet Union) Kosmos 63S1		(Soviet Union) Kapustin Yar Mayak-2		(Soviet Union)	
22 May; 03:00	(Soviet Union) Kosmos 17 (DS-A1 №2)		Low Earth	Technology; Radiation	24 June	Successful
24 May; 10:33	(Soviet Union) Vostok-2		(Soviet Union) Baikonur Site 1/5		(Soviet Union)	
24 May; 10:33	(Soviet Union) Kosmos 18 (Zenit-2 №11)		Low Earth	Optical imaging	2 June	Successful
← Jan; Feb; Mar; Apr; May; Jun; Jul; Aug; Sep; Oct; Nov; Dec →; === June ===
1 June; 02:50	(Soviet Union) Kosmos 63S1		(Soviet Union) Kapustin Yar Mayak-2		(Soviet Union)	
1 June; 02:50	(Soviet Union) DS-MT №1		Intended: Low Earth	Technology; Radiation	+4 seconds	Launch failure
1 June; 02:50	First stage malfunctioned four seconds after launch.					
12 June; 23:58	(United States) Thrust Augmented Thor SLV-2A Agena-D		(United States) Vandenberg LC-75-3-4		(United States) US Air Force	
12 June; 23:58	(United States) OPS 0954 (KH-4 21/9054)	US Air Force/NRO	Low Earth	Optical imaging	12 July	Partial spacecraft failure
12 June; 23:58	(United States) SRV 616	US Air Force/NRO	Low Earth	Film return	June	Successful
12 June; 23:58	Some images unusable due to corona effect.					
12 June	(United States) Atlas LV-3A Agena-B		(United States) Point Arguello LC-1-2		(United States) US Air Force	
12 June	(United States) MIDAS 8	US Air Force	Intended: Medium Earth	Missile defence	12 June	Launch failure
12 June	(United States) TRS-7	US Air Force	Intended: Medium Earth	Technology	12 June	Launch failure
12 June	(United States) TRS-8	US Air Force	Intended: Medium Earth	Technology	12 June	Launch failure
12 June	Failed to orbit.					
14 June; 11:58:58	(Soviet Union) Vostok-K		(Soviet Union) Baikonur Site 1/5		(Soviet Union)	
14 June; 11:58:58	(Soviet Union) Vostok 5		Low Earth	Biological; Technology	19 June; 11:58:58	Successful
14 June; 11:58:58	Crewed flight with cosmonaut Valery Bykovsky.					
15 June; 14:29	(United States) Thor DM-21 Agena-D		(United States) Vandenberg LC-75-1-1		(United States) US Air Force	
15 June; 14:29	(United States) Solrad 6A	US Navy/NRL	Low Earth	Radiation	1 August	Successful
15 June; 14:29	(United States) LOFTI 2B	US Navy/NRL	Low Earth	Ionospheric; Technology	18 July	Successful
15 June; 14:29	(United States) Surcal 3		Low Earth	Calibration	5 July	Successful
15 June; 14:29	(United States) Radose 112	US Navy/NRL	Low Earth	Radiation	30 July	Successful
15 June; 14:29	(United States) FTV 1292 (Poppy 2)	US Navy	Low Earth	ELINT	27 July	Successful
15 June; 14:29	NRL Composite 3.					
16 June; 01:49:52	(United States) Scout X-3		(United States) Point Arguello LC-D		(United States) US Air Force	
16 June; 01:49:52	(United States) Transit 5A-3	US Navy	Low Earth	Navigation	3 August 1990	Partial launch failure
16 June; 01:49:52	Damaged during launch, preventing operational use.					
16 June; 09:29:52	(Soviet Union) Vostok-K		(Soviet Union) Baikonur Site 1/5		(Soviet Union)	
16 June; 09:29:52	(Soviet Union) Vostok 6		Low Earth	Biological; Technology	19 June; 08:20	Successful
16 June; 09:29:52	Crewed flight with cosmonaut Valentina Tereshkova, first woman to fly in space, final flight of Vostok programme.					
19 June; 09:50:01	(United States) Delta B		(United States) Cape Canaveral LC-17B		(United States) US Air Force	
19 June; 09:50:01	(United States) TIROS-7 (Tiros-G/A-52)	ESSA	Low Earth	Weather	3 June 1994	Successful
27 June; 00:37	(United States) Thrust Augmented Thor SLV-2A Agena-D		(United States) Vandenberg LC-75-1-2		(United States) US Air Force	
27 June; 00:37	(United States) OPS 0999 (KH-4 22/9056)	US Air Force/NRO	Low Earth	Optical imaging	26 July	Partial spacecraft failure
27 June; 00:37	(United States) SRV 611	US Air Force/NRO	Low Earth	Film return	June/July	Successful
27 June; 00:37	(United States) Hitchhiker 2 (P-11 4201)	US Air Force	Low Earth	ELINT	In orbit	Successful
27 June; 00:37	Light leaks damaged film.					
28 June; 21:19:22	(United States) Scout X-4		(United States) Wallops Island LA-3		(United States) NASA	
28 June; 21:19:22	(United States) GRS (PL-19/CRL-1/AFCRL-A)	US Air Force	Low Earth	Ionospheric; Radiation	14 December 1983	Spacecraft failure
28 June; 21:19:22	Maiden flight of Scout X-4, spacecraft power supply failed after 13th orbit.					
29 June; 23:30	(United States) Thrust Augmented Thor SLV-2A Agena-B		(United States) Vandenberg LC-75-3-5		(United States) US Air Force	
29 June; 23:30	(United States) OPS 1440 (Ferret/Samos-F2 4)	US Air Force/NRO	Low Earth	ELINT	26 October 1969	Successful
29 June; 23:30	Maiden flight of the Thrust Augmented Thor SLV-2A Agena-B.					
← Jan; Feb; Mar; Apr; May; Jun; Jul; Aug; Sep; Oct; Nov; Dec →
For flights after 30 June, see 1963 in spaceflight (July–September)

== Suborbital flights ==
Date and time (UTC)	Rocket	Flight number	Launch site		LSP	
Date and time (UTC)	Payload (⚀ = CubeSat)	Operator	Orbit	Function	Decay (UTC)	Outcome
Date and time (UTC)	Remarks					
1 April	(United States) Centaure		(France) Kerguelen		(France) CNES	
1 April		CNRS	Suborbital	Ionospheric	1 April	Successful
1 April	Apogee: 130 kilometres (81 mi)					
3 April; 16:46	(United States) Aerobee-150A		(United States) Wallops Island		(United States) NASA	
3 April; 16:46		STAN	Suborbital	Ionospheric	3 April	Successful
3 April; 16:46	Apogee: 237 kilometres (147 mi)					
4 April; 15:00	(United States) Aerobee-150 (Hi)		(United States) White Sands LC-35		(United States) NRL	
4 April; 15:00		NRL	Suborbital	Solar	4 April	Successful
4 April; 15:00	Apogee: 205 kilometres (127 mi)					
4 April; 19:45:45	(United States) MGM-31 Pershing I		(United States) Cape Canaveral LC-30		(United States) US Army	
4 April; 19:45:45		US Army	Suborbital	Missile test	4 April	Successful
4 April; 19:45:45	Apogee: 250 kilometres (160 mi)					
5 April; 03:01:43	(United States) Scout X-3		(United States) Point Arguello LC-D		(United States) US Air Force	
5 April; 03:01:43	(United States) Transit 5A-2	US Navy	Intended: Low Earth	Navigation	5 April	Launch failure
5 April; 03:01:43	Replacement for Transit 5A-1, failed to orbit					
5 April	(United States) HGM-25A Titan I		(United States) Vandenberg LC-395A-1		(United States) US Air Force	
5 April		US Air Force	Suborbital	Missile test	5 April	Successful
5 April	Apogee: 1,000 kilometres (620 mi)					
6 April; 00:44:55	(United States) MGM-31 Pershing I		(United States) Cape Canaveral LC-30		(United States) US Army	
6 April; 00:44:55		US Army	Suborbital	Missile test	6 April	Successful
6 April; 00:44:55	Apogee: 250 kilometres (160 mi)					
6 April; 04:03	(Canada) Black Brant I		(Canada) Churchill		(Canada) NRC	
6 April; 04:03		NRC	Suborbital	Auroral; Aeronomy; Ionospheric	6 April	Successful
6 April; 04:03	Apogee: 144 kilometres (89 mi)					
6 April; 07:25	(Canada) Black Brant I		(Canada) Churchill		(Canada) NRC	
6 April; 07:25		NRC	Suborbital	Auroral/Ionospheric/Fields	6 April	Successful
6 April; 07:25	Apogee: 140 kilometres (87 mi)					
8 April; 11:26	(United States) Astrobee-1500		(United States) Wallops Island LA-2A		(United States) NASA	
8 April; 11:26		NASA	Suborbital	Test flight	8 April	Launch failure
8 April; 11:26	Apogee: 72 kilometres (45 mi)					
8 April; 16:00:02	(United States) UGM-27 Polaris A3		(United States) Cape Canaveral LC-29A		(United States) US Navy	
8 April; 16:00:02		US Navy	Suborbital	Missile test	8 April	Successful
8 April; 16:00:02	Apogee: 1,000 kilometres (620 mi)					
9 April; 20:28	(United States) Nike-Apache		(United States) Wallops Island		(United States) NASA	
9 April; 20:28		NASA	Suborbital	Ionospheric	9 April	Successful
9 April; 20:28	Apogee: 163 kilometres (101 mi)					
9 April	(Soviet Union) R-12 Dvina		(Soviet Union) Makat		(Soviet Union) MVS	
9 April		MVS	Suborbital	Missile test	9 April	Successful
9 April	Apogee: 402 kilometres (250 mi)					
10 April; 20:33:07	(United States) UGM-27 Polaris A3		(United States) USNS Observation Island, ETR		(United States) US Navy	
10 April; 20:33:07		US Navy	Suborbital	Missile test	10 April	Launch failure
10 April	(Soviet Union) R-12 Dvina		(Soviet Union) Kapustin Yar		(Soviet Union) MVS	
10 April		MVS	Suborbital	Missile test	10 April	Successful
10 April	Apogee: 402 kilometres (250 mi)					
11 April; 02:08:59	(United States) LGM-30B Minuteman IB		(United States) Cape Canaveral LC-31B		(United States) US Air Force	
11 April; 02:08:59		US Air Force	Suborbital	Missile test	11 April	Successful
11 April; 02:08:59	Apogee: 1,300 kilometres (810 mi)					
11 April; 20:30	(United States) LGM-30A Minuteman IA		(United States) Vandenberg LC-394A-5		(United States) US Air Force	
11 April; 20:30		US Air Force	Suborbital	Missile test	11 April	Successful
11 April; 20:30	Apogee: 1,300 kilometres (810 mi)					
11 April	(Soviet Union) R-14 Chusovaya		(Soviet Union) Plesetsk		(Soviet Union) RVSN	
11 April		RVSN	Suborbital	Missile test	11 April	Successful
11 April	Apogee: 675 kilometres (419 mi)					
12 April; 05:30	(United States) Aerobee-150A		(United States) Wallops Island		(United States) NASA	
12 April; 05:30		CSIRO	Suborbital	Ionospheric	12 April	Successful
12 April; 05:30	Apogee: 198 kilometres (123 mi)					
12 April; 14:00	(United States) Aerobee-150 (Hi)		(United States) White Sands LC-35		(United States) KPNO	
12 April; 14:00		KPNO	Suborbital	Aeronomy	12 April	Launch failure
12 April; 14:00	Apogee: 200 kilometres (120 mi)					
12 April; 19:29:21	(United States) MGM-31 Pershing I		(United States) Cape Canaveral LC-30		(United States) US Army	
12 April; 19:29:21		US Army	Suborbital	Missile test	12 April	Successful
12 April; 19:29:21	Apogee: 250 kilometres (160 mi)					
12 April	(United States) LGM-30A Minuteman IA		(United States) Vandenberg LC-394A-1		(United States) US Air Force	
12 April		US Air Force	Suborbital	Missile test	12 April	Successful
12 April	Apogee: 1,300 kilometres (810 mi)					
13 April	(United States) Nike-Zeus 3		(United States) Kwajalein		(United States) US Army	
13 April		US Army	Suborbital	Missile test	13 April	Successful
13 April	Apogee: 200 kilometres (120 mi)					
13 April	(United States) HGM-25A Titan I		(United States) Vandenberg LC-395A-3		(United States) Strategic Air Command	
13 April		Strategic Air Command	Suborbital	Target	13 April	Successful
13 April	Apogee: 1,000 kilometres (620 mi)					
17 April; 09:23	(United Kingdom) Skylark-7C		(Australia) Woomera LA-2		(United Kingdom) RAE	
17 April; 09:23		UCL/QUB	Suborbital	Aeronomy	17 April	Successful
17 April; 09:23	Apogee: 236 kilometres (147 mi)					
17 April; 16:39	(United States) MGM-31 Pershing I		(United States) Cape Canaveral LC-30E		(United States) US Army	
17 April; 16:39		US Army	Suborbital	Missile test	17 April	Successful
17 April; 16:39	Apogee: 250 kilometres (160 mi)					
17 April	(United States) UGM-27 Polaris A2		(United States) USS Ethan Allen, ETR		(United States) US Navy	
17 April		US Navy	Suborbital	Missile test	17 April	Successful
17 April	Apogee: 1,000 kilometres (620 mi)					
17 April	(United States) UGM-27 Polaris A2		(United States) USS Ethan Allen, ETR		(United States) US Navy	
17 April		US Navy	Suborbital	Missile test	17 April	Successful
17 April	Apogee: 1,000 kilometres (620 mi)					
17 April	(United States) UGM-27 Polaris A2		(United States) USS Ethan Allen, ETR		(United States) US Navy	
17 April		US Navy	Suborbital	Missile test	17 April	Successful
17 April	Apogee: 1,000 kilometres (620 mi)					
17 April			(Soviet Union) Plesetsk		(Soviet Union) MVS	
17 April		MVS	Suborbital	Missile test	17 April	Successful
17 April	Apogee: 200 kilometres (120 mi)					
17 April			(Soviet Union) Plesetsk		(Soviet Union) MVS	
17 April		MVS	Suborbital	Missile test	17 April	Successful
17 April	Apogee: 200 kilometres (120 mi)					
17 April			(Soviet Union) Plesetsk		(Soviet Union) MVS	
17 April		MVS	Suborbital	Missile test	17 April	Successful
17 April	Apogee: 200 kilometres (120 mi)					
18 April; 21:00:14	(United States) Aerobee-300A		(United States) Wallops Island		(United States) NASA	
18 April; 21:00:14		Michigan	Suborbital	Aeronomy	18 April	Successful
18 April; 21:00:14	Apogee: 342 kilometres (213 mi)					
18 April	(United States) UGM-27 Polaris A2		(United States) USS Ethan Allen, ETR		(United States) US Navy	
18 April		US Navy	Suborbital	Missile test	18 April	Successful
18 April	Apogee: 1,000 kilometres (620 mi)					
18 April	(United States) UGM-27 Polaris A2		(United States) USS Ethan Allen, ETR		(United States) US Navy	
18 April		US Navy	Suborbital	Missile test	18 April	Successful
18 April	Apogee: 1,000 kilometres (620 mi)					
18 April	(United States) UGM-27 Polaris A2		(United States) USS Ethan Allen, ETR		(United States) US Navy	
18 April		US Navy	Suborbital	Missile test	18 April	Successful
18 April	Apogee: 1,000 kilometres (620 mi)					
18 April	(United States) Nike-Zeus 3		(United States) White Sands LC-38		(United States) US Army	
18 April		US Army	Suborbital	Missile test	18 April	Successful
18 April	Apogee: 200 kilometres (120 mi)					
19 April; 20:00:11	(United States) LGM-25C Titan II		(United States) Cape Canaveral LC-15		(United States) US Air Force	
19 April; 20:00:11		US Air Force	Suborbital	Missile test	19 April	Launch failure
19 April; 20:00:11	Apogee: 500 kilometres (310 mi)					
20 April; 10:01	(France) Véronique		(Algeria) Hammaguira Blandine		(France) CNES	
20 April; 10:01		DFF/LPA	Suborbital	Aeronomy; Ionospheric	20 April	Successful
20 April; 10:01	Apogee: 175 kilometres (109 mi)					
20 April	(United States) Shotput		(United States) Wallops Island		(United States) NASA	
20 April	(Italy) San Marco Test 1	CRA	Suborbital	Technology	20 April	Successful
20 April	Apogee: 426 kilometres (265 mi)					
22 April	(Soviet Union) R-7A Semyorka		(Soviet Union) Baikonur		(Soviet Union) RVSN	
22 April		RVSN	Suborbital	Missile test	22 April	Successful
22 April	Apogee: 1,350 kilometres (840 mi)					
23 April; 20:48	(United States) Aerobee-150A		(United States) Wallops Island		(United States) NASA	
23 April; 20:48		NASA	Suborbital	Ionospheric	23 April	Successful
23 April; 20:48	Apogee: 199 kilometres (124 mi)					
23 April; 22:07	(France) Véronique		(Algeria) Hammaguira Blandine		(France) CNES	
23 April; 22:07		LPA	Suborbital	Aeronomy; Ionospheric	23 April	Successful
23 April; 22:07	Apogee: 140 kilometres (87 mi)					
23 April	(United States) LGM-30A Minuteman IA		(United States) Vandenberg LC-394A-4		(United States) US Air Force	
23 April		US Air Force	Suborbital	Missile test	23 April	Successful
23 April	Apogee: 1,300 kilometres (810 mi)					
24 April; 20:40:49	(United States) MGM-31 Pershing I		(United States) Cape Canaveral LC-30		(United States) US Army	
24 April; 20:40:49		US Army	Suborbital	Missile test	24 April	Successful
24 April; 20:40:49	Apogee: 250 kilometres (160 mi)					
24 April; 20:59:36	(United States) SM-65E Atlas		(United States) Vandenberg OSTF-1		(United States) US Air Force	
24 April; 20:59:36		US Air Force	Suborbital	Missile test	24 April	Successful
24 April; 20:59:36	Apogee: 1,600 kilometres (990 mi)					
24 April	(United States) Nike-Zeus 3		(United States) White Sands LC-38		(United States) US Army	
24 April		US Army	Suborbital	Missile test	24 April	Successful
24 April	Apogee: 200 kilometres (120 mi)					
24 April			(Soviet Union) Plesetsk		(Soviet Union) MVS	
24 April		MVS	Suborbital	Missile test	24 April	Successful
24 April	Apogee: 200 kilometres (120 mi)					
25 April	(United States) Hopi-Dart		(United States) Wallops Island		(United States) NASA	
25 April		NASA	Suborbital	Test flight	25 April	Launch failure
25 April	Apogee: 1 kilometre (0.62 mi)					
25 April	(Soviet Union) R-12 Dvina		(Soviet Union) Kapustin Yar		(Soviet Union) MVS	
25 April		MVS	Suborbital	Missile test	25 April	Successful
25 April	Apogee: 402 kilometres (250 mi)					
26 April; 18:31:23	(United States) UGM-27 Polaris A3		(United States) USNS Observation Island, ETR		(United States) US Navy	
26 April; 18:31:23		US Navy	Suborbital	Missile test	26 April	Successful
26 April; 18:31:23	Apogee: 1,000 kilometres (620 mi)					
26 April	(France) Dragon		(Algeria) Hammaguira Bacchus		(France) CNES	
26 April		Sud Aviation	Suborbital	Test flight	26 April	Launch failure
26 April	Apogee: 58 kilometres (36 mi)					
26 April	(Soviet Union) R-16U		(Soviet Union) Baikonur Site 41/4		(Soviet Union) RVSN	
26 April		RVSN	Suborbital	Missile test	26 April	Successful
26 April	Apogee: 1,210 kilometres (750 mi)					
27 April; 02:03	(United States) SM-65F Atlas		(United States) Cape Canaveral LC-11		(United States) US Air Force	
27 April; 02:03		US Air Force	Suborbital	REV Test	27 April	Successful
27 April; 02:03	Apogee: 1,400 kilometres (870 mi)					
27 April	(United States) LGM-25C Titan II		(United States) Vandenberg LC-395C		(United States) US Air Force	
27 April		US Air Force	Suborbital	Missile test	27 April	Successful
27 April	Apogee: 1,300 kilometres (810 mi)					
28 April	(Soviet Union) R-12 Dvina		(Soviet Union) Kapustin Yar		(Soviet Union) MVS	
28 April		MVS	Suborbital	Missile test	28 April	Successful
28 April	Apogee: 402 kilometres (250 mi)					
30 April; 04:00	(United States) Aerobee-150 (Hi)		(United States) White Sands LC-35		(United States) NRL	
30 April; 04:00		NRL	Suborbital	UV Astronomy	30 April	Successful
30 April; 04:00	Apogee: 197 kilometres (122 mi)					
30 April	(United States) LGM-30A Minuteman IA		(United States) Vandenberg LC-394A-2		(United States) US Air Force	
30 April		US Air Force	Suborbital	Missile test	30 April	Successful
30 April	Apogee: 1,300 kilometres (810 mi)					
April	(Soviet Union) R-14 Chusovaya		(Soviet Union) Plesetsk		(Soviet Union) RVSN	
April		RVSN	Suborbital	Missile test	April	Successful
April	Apogee: 675 kilometres (419 mi)					
1 May; 10:15	(United States) HGM-25A Titan I		(United States) Vandenberg LC-395A-1		(United States) US Air Force	
1 May; 10:15		US Air Force	Suborbital	Missile test	1 May	Launch failure
1 May; 16:59	(France) Véronique		(Algeria) Hammaguira Blandine		(France) CNES	
1 May; 16:59		LPA/CEA	Suborbital	Aeronomy; Ionospheric	1 May	Successful
1 May; 16:59	Apogee: 160 kilometres (99 mi)					
2 May; 15:03	(West Germany) Seliger 3		(West Germany) Cuxhaven		(West Germany) DRG	
2 May; 15:03		BSFEGmbH	Suborbital	Test flight	2 May	Successful
2 May; 15:03	Apogee: 120 kilometres (75 mi)					
2 May; 17:03	(United States) Aerobee-150 (Hi)		(United States) White Sands LC-35		(United States) US Air Force	
2 May; 17:03		US Air Force	Suborbital	Solar	2 May	Successful
2 May; 17:03	Apogee: 232 kilometres (144 mi)					
7 May; 20:30	(Canada) Black Brant II		(Canada) Churchill		(Canada) NRC	
7 May; 20:30		DRTE	Suborbital	Ionospheric	7 May	Successful
7 May; 20:30	Apogee: 139 kilometres (86 mi)					
7 May; 21:11	(United States) Aerobee-150A		(United States) Wallops Island		(United States) NASA	
7 May; 21:11		Johns Hopkins	Suborbital	Aeronomy	7 May	Successful
7 May; 21:11	Apogee: 223 kilometres (139 mi)					
8 May; 17:23	(United States) Nike-Apache		(United States) Wallops Island		(United States) NASA	
8 May; 17:23		Lockheed	Suborbital	Aeronomy	8 May	Successful
8 May; 17:23	Apogee: 166 kilometres (103 mi)					
8 May	(United States) LGM-30A Minuteman IA		(United States) Vandenberg LC-394A-5		(United States) US Air Force	
8 May		US Air Force	Suborbital	Missile test	8 May	Successful
8 May	Apogee: 1,300 kilometres (810 mi)					
9 May; 16:08:32	(United States) LGM-25C Titan II		(United States) Cape Canaveral LC-16		(United States) US Air Force	
9 May; 16:08:32		US Air Force	Suborbital	Missile test	9 May	Launch failure
9 May; 16:08:32	Apogee: 1,000 kilometres (620 mi)					
9 May; 18:02	(United States) Aerobee-150A		(United States) Wallops Island		(United States) NASA	
9 May; 18:02		CSIRO	Suborbital	Ionospheric	9 May	Successful
9 May; 18:02	Apogee: 203 kilometres (126 mi)					
10 May; 14:45	(United States) Aerobee-150 (Hi)		(United States) White Sands LC-35		(United States) NRL	
10 May; 14:45		NRL	Suborbital	Solar	10 May	Successful
10 May; 14:45	Apogee: 214 kilometres (133 mi)					
10 May; 17:44:04	(United States) UGM-27 Polaris A3		(United States) Cape Canaveral LC-25A		(United States) US Navy	
10 May; 17:44:04		US Navy	Suborbital	Missile test	10 May	Successful
10 May; 17:44:04	Apogee: 1,000 kilometres (620 mi)					
10 May	(United States) Nike-Zeus 3		(United States) White Sands LC-38		(United States) US Army	
10 May		US Army	Suborbital	Missile test	10 May	Launch failure
10 May	Apogee: 20 kilometres (12 mi)					
10 May	(France) Véronique		(Algeria) Hammaguira Blandine		(France) CNES	
10 May		CNRS	Suborbital	Solar	10 May	Successful
10 May	Apogee: 135 kilometres (84 mi)					
11 May	(United States) Kiva-Hopi		(United States) Point Arguello LC-B		(United States) US Air Force	
11 May		US Air Force	Suborbital	Aeronomy	11 May	
11 May	Apogee: 300 kilometres (190 mi)					
13 May	(United States) LGM-25C Titan II		(United States) Vandenberg LC-395D		(United States) US Air Force	
13 May		US Air Force	Suborbital	Missile test	13 May	Successful
13 May	Apogee: 1,300 kilometres (810 mi)					
14 May; 15:45	(United States) Aerobee-150 (Hi)		(United States) White Sands LC-35		(United States) NASA	
14 May; 15:45		NASA	Suborbital	Technology	14 May	Successful
14 May; 15:45	Apogee: 185 kilometres (115 mi)					
14 May	(France) Centaure		(Algeria) Hammaguira Bacchus		(France) CNES	
14 May		CNRS	Suborbital	Aeronomy	14 May	Successful
14 May	Apogee: 150 kilometres (93 mi)					
15 May; 18:22	(France) Centaure		(Algeria) Hammaguira Bacchus		(France) CNES	
15 May; 18:22		CNRS	Suborbital	Aeronomy	15 May	Successful
15 May; 18:22	Apogee: 155 kilometres (96 mi)					
16 May; 04:00	(United States) Nike-Cajun		(United States) Eglin		(United States) US Air Force	
16 May; 04:00		AFCRL	Suborbital	Aeronomy	16 May	Successful
16 May; 04:00	Apogee: 156 kilometres (97 mi)					
16 May; 14:38	(United States) Nike-Cajun		(Pakistan) Sonmiani		(United States) NASA	
16 May; 14:38		SUPA	Suborbital	Aeronomy	16 May	Successful
16 May; 14:38	Apogee: 146 kilometres (91 mi)					
17 May; 16:14:59	(United States) UGM-27 Polaris A3		(United States) Cape Canaveral LC-25A		(United States) US Navy	
17 May; 16:14:59		US Navy	Suborbital	Missile test	17 May	Successful
17 May; 16:14:59	Apogee: 1,000 kilometres (620 mi)					
17 May; 23:00:18	(United States) Blue Scout Junior SLV-1C		(United States) Point Arguello LC-A		(United States) US Air Force	
17 May; 23:00:18		US Air Force	Suborbital	Communications	17 May	Successful
17 May; 23:00:18	Apogee: 1,000 kilometres (620 mi)					
18 May; 01:06	(United States) Nike-Apache		(United States) Eglin		(United States) NASA	
18 May; 01:06		AFCRL	Suborbital	Aeronomy	18 May	Successful
18 May; 01:06	Apogee: 185 kilometres (115 mi)					
18 May; 05:14:00	(United States) LGM-30B Minuteman IB		(United States) Cape Canaveral LC-32B		(United States) US Air Force	
18 May; 05:14:00		US Air Force	Suborbital	Missile test	18 May	Launch failure
18 May; 05:14:00	Apogee: 10 kilometres (6.2 mi)					
18 May; 08:55	(United States) Nike-Cajun		(United States) Eglin		(United States) US Air Force	
18 May; 08:55		AFCRL	Suborbital	Aeronomy	18 May	Successful
18 May; 08:55	Apogee: 167 kilometres (104 mi)					
18 May; 10:06	(United States) Nike-Apache		(United States) Eglin		(United States) NASA	
18 May; 10:06		AFCRL	Suborbital	Aeronomy	18 May	Successful
18 May; 10:06	Apogee: 187 kilometres (116 mi)					
18 May	(Soviet Union) R-16U		(Soviet Union) Baikonur Site 60/7		(Soviet Union) RVSN	
18 May		RVSN	Suborbital	Missile test	18 May	Launch failure
18 May	(Soviet Union) R-16U		(Soviet Union) Baikonur Site 60/6		(Soviet Union) RVSN	
18 May		RVSN	Suborbital	Missile test	18 May	Successful
18 May	Apogee: 1,210 kilometres (750 mi)					
18 May	(Soviet Union) R-16U		(Soviet Union) Baikonur Site 60/8		(Soviet Union) RVSN	
18 May		RVSN	Suborbital	Missile test	18 May	Successful
18 May	Apogee: 1,210 kilometres (750 mi)					
18 May	(Soviet Union) R-7A Semyorka		(Soviet Union) Baikonur		(Soviet Union) RVSN	
18 May		RVSN	Suborbital	Missile test	18 May	Successful
18 May	Apogee: 1,350 kilometres (840 mi)					
20 May; 02:09	(Japan) Kappa-9M		(Japan) Kagoshima		(Japan) ISAS	
20 May; 02:09		TAO	Suborbital	Ionospheric	20 May	Successful
20 May; 02:09	Apogee: 345 kilometres (214 mi)					
20 May	(United States) Nike-Apache		(Italy) Salto di Quirra		(United States) NASA	
20 May		ROSAP	Suborbital	Aeronomy	20 May	Successful
20 May	Apogee: 200 kilometres (120 mi)					
20 May	(Soviet Union) R-9 Desna		(Soviet Union) Baikonur		(Soviet Union) RVSN	
20 May		RVSN	Suborbital	Missile test	20 May	Successful
20 May	Apogee: 1,160 kilometres (720 mi)					
21 May; 05:30	(United States) Aerobee-150 (Hi)		(United States) White Sands LC-35		(United States) NRL	
21 May; 05:30		NRL	Suborbital	UV Astronomy	21 May	Successful
21 May; 05:30	Apogee: 192 kilometres (119 mi)					
21 May; 18:25	(France) Centaure		(Algeria) Hammaguira Bacchus		(France) CNES	
21 May; 18:25		CNRS	Suborbital	Aeronomy	21 May	Successful
21 May; 18:25	Apogee: 125 kilometres (78 mi)					
21 May	(United States) Nike-Apache		(Italy) Salto di Quirra		(United States) NASA	
21 May		ROSAP	Suborbital	Aeronomy	21 May	Successful
21 May	Apogee: 200 kilometres (120 mi)					
21 May	(United States) Nike-Apache		(Italy) Salto di Quirra		(United States) NASA	
21 May		ROSAP	Suborbital	Aeronomy	21 May	Successful
21 May	Apogee: 200 kilometres (120 mi)					
21 May	(France) Centaure		(France) Reggane		(France) CNES	
21 May		CNRS	Suborbital	Aeronomy	21 May	Successful
21 May	Apogee: 150 kilometres (93 mi)					
21 May	(France) Centaure		(France) CERES		(France) CNES	
21 May		CNRS	Suborbital	Aeronomy	21 May	Successful
21 May	Apogee: 150 kilometres (93 mi)					
22 May; 01:10	(United States) Nike-Cajun		(United States) Eglin		(United States) NASA	
22 May; 01:10		AFCRL	Suborbital	Aeronomy	22 May	Successful
22 May; 01:10	Apogee: 135 kilometres (84 mi)					
22 May; 04:38	(United States) Scout X-3		(United States) Wallops Island LA-3		(United States) NASA	
22 May; 04:38		NASA	Suborbital	REV Test	22 May	Successful
22 May; 04:38	Apogee: 145 kilometres (90 mi)					
22 May; 05:10	(United States) Nike-Apache		(Canada) Churchill		(United States) NASA	
22 May; 05:10		GCA/CNRS	Suborbital	Aeronomy	22 May	Successful
22 May; 05:10	Apogee: 186 kilometres (116 mi)					
22 May; 08:51	(United States) Nike-Apache		(Canada) Churchill		(United States) NASA	
22 May; 08:51		GCA/CNRS	Suborbital	Aeronomy	22 May	Successful
22 May; 08:51	Apogee: 184 kilometres (114 mi)					
23 May; 05:13	(United States) Nike-Apache		(Canada) Churchill		(United States) NASA	
23 May; 05:13		GCA/CNRS	Suborbital	Aeronomy	23 May	Successful
23 May; 05:13	Apogee: 200 kilometres (120 mi)					
23 May; 08:46	(United Kingdom) Skylark-7C		(Australia) Woomera LA-2		(United Kingdom) RAE	
23 May; 08:46		Met Office; Jodrell Bank	Suborbital	Solar; Aeronomy	23 May	Successful
23 May; 08:46	Apogee: 201 kilometres (125 mi)					
23 May	(United States) Nike-Zeus 3		(United States) Kwajalein		(United States) US Army	
23 May		US Army	Suborbital	ASAT test	23 May	Successful
23 May	Apogee: 200 kilometres (120 mi)					
24 May; 00:45	(United States) Nike-Apache		(United States) Wallops Island		(United States) NASA	
24 May; 00:45		GCA	Suborbital	Aeronomy	24 May	Successful
24 May; 00:45	Apogee: 205 kilometres (127 mi)					
24 May; 09:00	(United States) Nike-Apache		(United States) Wallops Island		(United States) NASA	
24 May; 09:00		GCA	Suborbital	Aeronomy	24 May	Successful
24 May; 09:00	Apogee: 204 kilometres (127 mi)					
24 May; 17:33:05	(United States) LGM-25C Titan II		(United States) Cape Canaveral LC-15		(United States) US Air Force	
24 May; 17:33:05		US Air Force	Suborbital	Missile test	24 May	Successful
24 May; 17:33:05	Apogee: 1,300 kilometres (810 mi)					
24 May	(United States) LGM-30B Minuteman IB		(United States) Vandenberg LC-394A-6		(United States) US Air Force	
24 May		US Air Force	Suborbital	Missile test	24 May	Successful
24 May	Apogee: 1,300 kilometres (810 mi)					
24 May	(France) Centaure		(Algeria) Hammaguira Bacchus		(France) CNES	
24 May		CNRS	Suborbital	Aeronomy	24 May	Successful
24 May	Apogee: 150 kilometres (93 mi)					
25 May; 00:47	(United States) Nike-Apache		(United States) Wallops Island		(United States) NASA	
25 May; 00:47		GCA	Suborbital	Aeronomy	25 May	Successful
25 May; 00:47	Apogee: 197 kilometres (122 mi)					
25 May	(Soviet Union) R-16U		(Soviet Union) Baikonur Site 41/15		(Soviet Union) RVSN	
25 May		RVSN	Suborbital	Missile test	25 May	Successful
25 May	Apogee: 1,210 kilometres (750 mi)					
25 May	(France) Centaure		(Argentina) CELPA		(France) CNES	
25 May		CNRS	Suborbital	Aeronomy	25 May	Successful
25 May	Apogee: 189 kilometres (117 mi)					
26 May; 05:34:00	(United States) Honest John-Nike		(United States) Barking Sands		(United States) US Air Force	
26 May; 05:34:00		Sandia	Suborbital	Aeronomy	26 May	
26 May; 05:34:00	Apogee: 103 kilometres (64 mi)					
29 May; 04:35	(United Kingdom) Skylark-7C		(Australia) Woomera LA-2		(United Kingdom) RAE	
29 May; 04:35		UCL/RSRS	Suborbital	Ionospheric; Solar	29 May	Successful
29 May; 04:35	Apogee: 209 kilometres (130 mi)					
29 May; 04:48:14	(United States) LGM-30B Minuteman IB		(United States) Cape Canaveral LC-31B		(United States) US Air Force	
29 May; 04:48:14		US Air Force	Suborbital	Missile test	29 May	Successful
29 May; 04:48:14	Apogee: 1,300 kilometres (810 mi)					
29 May; 16:56:24	(United States) LGM-25C Titan II		(United States) Cape Canaveral LC-16		(United States) US Air Force	
29 May; 16:56:24		US Air Force	Suborbital	Missile test	29 May	Launch failure
29 May; 16:56:24	Apogee: 6 kilometres (3.7 mi)					
29 May	(United States) Nike Javelin		(United States) Eglin		(United States) Air Force Air Proving Ground Command (AGPC)	
29 May		AGPC	Suborbital	Test flight	29 May	Successful
29 May	Apogee: 131 kilometres (81 mi)					
30 May	(France) Centaure		(Argentina) CELPA		(France) CNES	
30 May		CNRS	Suborbital	Aeronomy	30 May	Successful
30 May	Apogee: 150 kilometres (93 mi)					
30 May	(France) Centaure		(Argentina) CELPA		(France) CNES	
30 May		CNRS	Suborbital	Aeronomy	30 May	Successful
30 May	Apogee: 150 kilometres (93 mi)					
1 June	(Soviet Union) R-16U		(Soviet Union) Baikonur Site 41/15		(Soviet Union) RVSN	
1 June		RVSN	Suborbital	Missile test	1 June	Launch failure
1 June	Apogee: 1,210 kilometres (750 mi)					
4 June; 20:12:18	(United States) SM-65E Atlas		(United States) Vandenberg OSTF-1		(United States) US Air Force	
4 June; 20:12:18		US Air Force	Suborbital	Missile test	4 June	Successful
4 June; 20:12:18	Apogee: 1,600 kilometres (990 mi)					
4 June	(United States) UGM-27 Polaris A2		(United States) USS Robert E. Lee, ETR		(United States) US Navy	
4 June		US Navy	Suborbital	Missile test	4 June	Successful
4 June	Apogee: 1,000 kilometres (620 mi)					
4 June	(United States) UGM-27 Polaris A2		(United States) USS Robert E. Lee, ETR		(United States) US Navy	
4 June		US Navy	Suborbital	Missile test	4 June	Successful
4 June	Apogee: 1,000 kilometres (620 mi)					
4 June	(United States) UGM-27 Polaris A2		(United States) USS Robert E. Lee, ETR		(United States) US Navy	
4 June		US Navy	Suborbital	Missile test	4 June	Successful
4 June	Apogee: 1,000 kilometres (620 mi)					
4 June	(United States) UGM-27 Polaris A2		(United States) USS Robert E. Lee, ETR		(United States) US Navy	
4 June		US Navy	Suborbital	Missile test	4 June	Successful
4 June	Apogee: 1,000 kilometres (620 mi)					
4 June	(United States) UGM-27 Polaris A2		(United States) USS Robert E. Lee, ETR		(United States) US Navy	
4 June		US Navy	Suborbital	Missile test	4 June	Successful
4 June	Apogee: 1,000 kilometres (620 mi)					
4 June	(United States) UGM-27 Polaris A2		(United States) USS Robert E. Lee, ETR		(United States) US Navy	
4 June		US Navy	Suborbital	Missile test	4 June	Successful
4 June	Apogee: 1,000 kilometres (620 mi)					
5 June	(United States) Nike-Zeus 3		(United States) White Sands LC-38		(United States) US Army	
5 June		US Army	Suborbital	Missile test	5 June	Successful
5 June	Apogee: 200 kilometres (120 mi)					
6 June; 00:30	(Soviet Union) R-5B Pobeda		(Soviet Union) Plesetsk		(Soviet Union) AN	
6 June; 00:30		AN	Suborbital	Ionospheric; Plasma	6 June	Successful
6 June; 00:30	Apogee: 500 kilometres (310 mi)					
6 June; 04:14:59	(United States) LGM-30B Minuteman IB		(United States) Cape Canaveral LC-32B		(United States) US Air Force	
6 June; 04:14:59		US Air Force	Suborbital	Missile test	6 June	Successful
6 June; 04:14:59	Apogee: 1,300 kilometres (810 mi)					
6 June; 14:30	(United States) Aerobee-150 (Hi)		(United States) White Sands LC-35		(United States) NRL	
6 June; 14:30		NRL	Suborbital	Aeronomy	6 June	Successful
6 June; 14:30	Apogee: 208 kilometres (129 mi)					
6 June; 16:16:59	(United States) UGM-27 Polaris A3		(United States) Cape Canaveral LC-25A		(United States) US Navy	
6 June; 16:16:59		US Navy	Suborbital	Missile test	6 June	Successful
6 June; 16:16:59	Apogee: 1,000 kilometres (620 mi)					
6 June	(Soviet Union) R-12 Dvina		(Soviet Union) Plesetsk		(Soviet Union) MVS	
6 June		MVS	Suborbital	Missile test	6 June	Successful
6 June	Apogee: 402 kilometres (250 mi)					
8 June	(Soviet Union) R-12 Dvina		(Soviet Union) Plesetsk		(Soviet Union) MVS	
8 June		MVS	Suborbital	Missile test	8 June	Successful
8 June	Apogee: 402 kilometres (250 mi)					
8 June	(Soviet Union) R-12 Dvina		(Soviet Union) Plesetsk		(Soviet Union) MVS	
8 June		MVS	Suborbital	Missile test	8 June	Successful
8 June	Apogee: 402 kilometres (250 mi)					
11 June; 05:06	(Canada) Black Brant II		(Canada) Churchill		(Canada) NRC	
11 June; 05:06		DRTE	Suborbital	Ionospheric	11 June	Successful
11 June; 05:06	Apogee: 135 kilometres (84 mi)					
11 June; 05:15	(United States) Aerobee-150 (Hi)		(United States) White Sands LC-35		(United States) US Air Force	
11 June; 05:15		AFCRL	Suborbital	Solar	11 June	Successful
11 June; 05:15	Apogee: 302 kilometres (188 mi)					
12 June; 09:03:01	(United States) SM-65D Atlas		(United States) Vandenberg LC-576A-3		(United States) Strategic Air Command	
12 June; 09:03:01		Strategic Air Command	Suborbital	Target	12 June	Successful
12 June; 09:03:01	Apogee: 1,800 kilometres (1,100 mi)					
12 June; 09:30	(United States) Nike-Zeus 3		(United States) Kwajalein		(United States) US Army	
12 June; 09:30		US Army	Suborbital	Missile test	12 June	Successful
12 June; 09:30	Apogee: 200 kilometres (120 mi)					
12 June; 18:39	(France) Centaure 1		(Algeria) Hammaguira Bacchus		(France) CNES	
12 June; 18:39		CNRS; UCL	Suborbital	Ionospheric	12 June	Successful
12 June; 18:39	Apogee: 145 kilometres (90 mi)					
12 June	(United States) Tomahawk		(United States) Tonopah		(United States) Sandia	
12 June		Sandia	Suborbital	Test flight	12 June	Successful
12 June	Apogee: 105 kilometres (65 mi)					
13 June; 16:30:02	(United States) UGM-27 Polaris A2		(United States) USS Lafayette, ETR		(United States) US Navy	
13 June; 16:30:02		US Navy	Suborbital	Missile test	13 June	Launch failure
13 June; 16:30:02	Apogee: 100 kilometres (62 mi)					
13 June; 17:05:34	(United States) UGM-27 Polaris A2		(United States) USS Lafayette, ETR		(United States) US Navy	
13 June; 17:05:34		US Navy	Suborbital	Missile test	13 June	Successful
13 June; 17:05:34	Apogee: 1,000 kilometres (620 mi)					
13 June	(Soviet Union) R-9 Desna		(Soviet Union) Baikonur		(Soviet Union) RVSN	
13 June		RVSN	Suborbital	Missile test	13 June	Launch failure
13 June	(France) Centaure 1		(Algeria) Hammaguira Bacchus		(France) CNES	
13 June		CNRS	Suborbital	Aeronomy	13 June	Successful
13 June	Apogee: 150 kilometres (93 mi)					
14 June	(Soviet Union) R-12 Dvina		(Soviet Union) Plesetsk		(Soviet Union) MVS	
14 June		MVS	Suborbital	Missile test	14 June	Successful
14 June	Apogee: 402 kilometres (250 mi)					
14 June	(France) Centaure 1		(Algeria) Hammaguira Bacchus		(France) CNES	
14 June		CNRS	Suborbital	Aeronomy	14 June	Successful
14 June	Apogee: 150 kilometres (93 mi)					
17 June; 16:14:02	(United States) UGM-27 Polaris A3		(United States) USNS Observation Island, ETR		(United States) US Navy	
17 June; 16:14:02		US Navy	Suborbital	Missile test	17 June	Successful
17 June; 16:14:02	Apogee: 1,000 kilometres (620 mi)					
17 June; 18:00	(United States) Aerobee-150 (Hi)		(United States) White Sands LC-35		(United States) NASA	
17 June; 18:00		NASA	Suborbital	Test flight	17 June	Successful
17 June; 18:00	Apogee: 182 kilometres (113 mi)					
18 June; 00:30	(Soviet Union) R-5B Pobeda		(Soviet Union) Plesetsk		(Soviet Union) AN	
18 June; 00:30		AN	Suborbital	Aeronomy; Ionospheric	18 June	Successful
18 June; 00:30	Apogee: 500 kilometres (310 mi)					
18 June; 03:28	(United States) Nike-Cajun		(United States) Kwajalein		(United States) US Navy	
18 June; 03:28		Michigan	Suborbital	Aeronomy	18 June	Successful
18 June; 03:28	Apogee: 177 kilometres (110 mi)					
18 June; 04:30	(United Kingdom) Skylark-7C		(Australia) Woomera LA-2		(United Kingdom) RAE	
18 June; 04:30		UCL/RSRS	Suborbital	Ionospheric; Solar	18 June	Successful
18 June; 04:30	Apogee: 196 kilometres (122 mi)					
18 June	(United States) LGM-30A Minuteman IA		(United States) Vandenberg LC-394A-3		(United States) Strategic Air Command	
18 June		Strategic Air Command	Suborbital	Missile test	18 June	Successful
18 June	Apogee: 1,300 kilometres (810 mi)					
18 June	(France) Véronique		(Algeria) Hammaguira Blandine		(France) CNES	
18 June		CNRS	Suborbital	Ionospheric	18 June	Launch failure
18 June	Apogee: 160 kilometres (99 mi)					
19 June; 17:33	(United States) Aerobee-150 (Hi)		(United States) Wallops Island		(United States) NASA	
19 June; 17:33		NASA	Suborbital	Technology	19 June	Successful
19 June; 17:33	Apogee: 189 kilometres (117 mi)					
19 June	(France) Véronique		(Algeria) Hammaguira Blandine		(France) CNES	
19 June		CNRS	Suborbital	Ionospheric	19 June	Launch failure
19 June	Apogee: 38 kilometres (24 mi)					
20 June; 03:00	(United States) Nike-Cajun		(United States) Kwajalein		(United States) US Navy	
20 June; 03:00		Michigan	Suborbital	Aeronomy	20 June	Successful
20 June; 03:00	Apogee: 180 kilometres (110 mi)					
20 June; 05:20	(United Kingdom) Skylark-7C		(Australia) Woomera LA-2		(United Kingdom) RAE	
20 June; 05:20		UCL	Suborbital	Ionospheric; Solar	20 June	Successful
20 June; 05:20	Apogee: 227 kilometres (141 mi)					
20 June; 14:25	(United States) Aerobee-150 (Hi)		(United States) White Sands LC-35		(United States) NASA	
20 June; 14:25		NRL	Suborbital	Test flight	20 June	Successful
20 June; 14:25	Apogee: 195 kilometres (121 mi)					
20 June	(United States) LGM-25C Titan II		(United States) Vandenberg LC-395C		(United States) US Air Force	
20 June		US Air Force	Suborbital	Missile test	20 June	Successful
20 June	Apogee: 1,300 kilometres (810 mi)					
21 June; 15:44:03	(United States) UGM-27 Polaris A3		(United States) USNS Observation Island, ETR		(United States) US Navy	
21 June; 15:44:03		US Navy	Suborbital	Missile test	21 June	Successful
21 June; 15:44:03	Apogee: 1,000 kilometres (620 mi)					
21 June	(Soviet Union) R-16U		(Soviet Union) Baikonur Site 41/15		(Soviet Union) RVSN	
21 June		RVSN	Suborbital	Missile test	21 June	Launch failure
24 June; 19:00	(Canada) Black Brant II		(Canada) Churchill		(Canada) CARDE	
24 June; 19:00		CARDE	Suborbital	Test flight	24 June	Successful
24 June; 19:00	Apogee: 171 kilometres (106 mi)					
24 June; 23:00	(Canada) Black Brant II		(Canada) Churchill		(Canada) CARDE	
24 June; 23:00		CARDE	Suborbital	Test flight	24 June	Successful
24 June; 23:00	Apogee: 162 kilometres (101 mi)					
24 June	(United States) UGM-27 Polaris A2		(United States) USS Thomas A. Edison, ETR		(United States) US Navy	
24 June		US Navy	Suborbital	Missile test	24 June	Successful
24 June	Apogee: 1,000 kilometres (620 mi)					
24 June	(United States) UGM-27 Polaris A2		(United States) USS Thomas A. Edison, ETR		(United States) US Navy	
24 June		US Navy	Suborbital	Missile test	24 June	Successful
24 June	Apogee: 1,000 kilometres (620 mi)					
24 June	(United States) UGM-27 Polaris A2		(United States) USS Thomas A. Edison, ETR		(United States) US Navy	
24 June		US Navy	Suborbital	Missile test	24 June	Successful
24 June	Apogee: 1,000 kilometres (620 mi)					
24 June	(United States) UGM-27 Polaris A2		(United States) USS Thomas A. Edison, ETR		(United States) US Navy	
24 June		US Navy	Suborbital	Missile test	24 June	Successful
24 June	Apogee: 1,000 kilometres (620 mi)					
24 June	(United States) UGM-27 Polaris A2		(United States) USS Thomas A. Edison, ETR		(United States) US Navy	
24 June		US Navy	Suborbital	Missile test	24 June	Successful
24 June	Apogee: 1,000 kilometres (620 mi)					
24 June	(United States) UGM-27 Polaris A2		(United States) USS Thomas A. Edison, ETR		(United States) US Navy	
24 June		US Navy	Suborbital	Missile test	24 June	Successful
24 June	Apogee: 1,000 kilometres (620 mi)					
25 June; 13:20	(United States) Aerobee-150 (Hi)		(United States) White Sands LC-35		(United States) KPNO	
25 June; 13:20		KPNO	Suborbital	Aeronomy; Auroral	25 June	Successful
25 June; 13:20	Apogee: 213 kilometres (132 mi)					
25 June	(United States) Nike-Tomahawk 9A		(United States) Barking Sands		(United States) Sandia	
25 June		Sandia	Suborbital	Test flight	25 June	Successful
25 June	Apogee: 250 kilometres (160 mi)					
26 June	(Soviet Union) R-12 Dvina		(Soviet Union) Makat		(Soviet Union) MVS	
26 June		MVS	Suborbital	Missile test	26 June	Successful
26 June	Apogee: 402 kilometres (250 mi)					
27 June	(France) Berenice		(France) CERES		(France) ONERA	
27 June		ONERA	Suborbital	REV Test	27 June	Successful
27 June	Apogee: 270 kilometres (170 mi)					
28 June; 02:34:12	(United States) LGM-30B Minuteman IB		(United States) Cape Canaveral LC-31B		(United States) US Air Force	
28 June; 02:34:12		US Air Force	Suborbital	Missile test	28 June	Successful
28 June; 02:34:12	Apogee: 1,300 kilometres (810 mi)					
28 June; 14:30	(United States) Aerobee-150 (Hi)		(United States) White Sands LC-35		(United States) NASA	
28 June; 14:30		NRL	Suborbital	Solar	28 June	Successful
28 June; 14:30	Apogee: 204 kilometres (127 mi)					
28 June	(United States) LGM-30A Minuteman IA		(United States) Vandenberg LC-394A-1		(United States) Strategic Air Command	
28 June		Strategic Air Command	Suborbital	Missile test	28 June	Successful
28 June	Apogee: 1,300 kilometres (810 mi)					
28 June	(Soviet Union) R-16U		(Soviet Union) Baikonur Site 41/15		(Soviet Union) RVSN	
28 June		RVSN	Suborbital	Missile test	28 June	Successful
28 June	Apogee: 1,210 kilometres (750 mi)					
29 June; 16:46	(United States) Aerobee-150 (Hi)		(United States) Eglin		(United States) US Air Force	
29 June; 16:46		AFCRL	Suborbital	Ionospheric	29 June	Successful
29 June; 16:46	Apogee: 156 kilometres (97 mi)					
29 June	(Soviet Union) R-14 Chusovaya		(Soviet Union) Plesetsk		(Soviet Union) RVSN	
29 June		RVSN	Suborbital	Missile test	29 June	Successful
29 June	Apogee: 675 kilometres (419 mi)					
29 June	(Soviet Union) R-14 Chusovaya		(Soviet Union) Plesetsk		(Soviet Union) RVSN	
29 June		RVSN	Suborbital	Missile test	29 June	Successful
29 June	Apogee: 675 kilometres (419 mi)					
30 June	(United States) Tomahawk		(United States) Point Mugu			
30 June		Sandia	Suborbital	Test flight	30 June	Launch failure
30 June	Apogee: 10 kilometres (6.2 mi)					
30 June	(Soviet Union) R-16U		(Soviet Union) Baikonur Site 60/7		(Soviet Union) RVSN	
30 June		RVSN	Suborbital	Missile test	30 June	Successful
30 June	Apogee: 1,210 kilometres (750 mi)					
June	(Soviet Union) RT-1		(Soviet Union) Plesetsk		(Soviet Union) RVSN	
June		RVSN	Suborbital	Missile test	June	Successful
June	Apogee: 500 kilometres (310 mi)					
June	(United States) Nike-Apache		(United States) White Sands		(United States) US Army	
June		US Army	Suborbital	REV Test	June	Successful
June	Apogee: 100 kilometres (62 mi)					
June	(United States) Nike-Apache		(United States) White Sands		(United States) US Army	
June		US Army	Suborbital		June	Successful
June	Apogee: 100 kilometres (62 mi)					
June	(United States) Nike-Apache		(United States) White Sands		(United States) US Army	
June		US Army	Suborbital		June	Successful
June	Apogee: 100 kilometres (62 mi)					
June	(United States) Nike-Apache		(United States) White Sands		(United States) US Army	
June		US Army	Suborbital		June	Successful
June	Apogee: 100 kilometres (62 mi)					
