= Remnants of launchpads in Germany =

In Germany, military test rockets were launched in Peenemünde (including Greifswalder Oie) and Cuxhaven, and larger non-military rockets were launched in Hespenbusch, Cuxhaven and Zingst. In World War II, A4-rockets were also launched as weapons from several western areas of Germany. Several launchpads were also constructed for the Bachem Ba 349 (also known as Natter), developed in 1944/45.

== Peenemünde ==
From Test stand VII, the most important launchpad for test rockets in Peenemünde, the mud wall, the channel for static tests, the concrete slab used for launches and some remains of the assembly hall still exist. The area is not open to tourists.

== Greifswalder Oie ==
From the former launchpad, a piece of rail and the former observation shelter still exist. The area is open to tourists.

== Cuxhaven ==
In the area of Cuxhaven, a launchpad was constructed only for Operation Backfire. Launches for other operations in this area were made from mobile pads. A trench and some shelter remnants of the Backfire launchpad still exist. Also, the old Navy shelter used Hermann-Oberth-Gesellschaft as control shelter still exists. The area is open to tourists.

== Hespenbusch ==
In Hespenbusch only small rockets were launched from mobile launch pads.

== Zingst ==
In Zingst, a lighted roadway indicates that there was once an important facility. It is possible that the concrete slab on which the launchpad stood still exists.

== Liebenau ==
In Liebenau, the concrete slab probably still exists, which was used for launching the last A4-rockets in World War II in Germany in April 1945.

== Launch sites for war use of A4 ==
The war launches of A4 were made from mobile launch sites, for which no permanent construction was necessary. Nevertheless, there are at some sites concrete pads still in existence (in Hillscheid, for example).

== Launch sites for Bachem Ba 349 ==
On the Ochsenkopf high ground in Lager Heuberg near Stetten am kalten Markt, there is still the concrete pad from which the first manned launch of a Bachem Ba 349 that took place on 1 March 1945, which ended with the pilot Lothar Sieber being killed. The site is on an active Bundeswehr military exercise area and therefore is not open to tourists.

Three other launch sites for the unmanned Bachem Ba 349 test flights are situated in the Hasenholz forest near Kirchheim/Teck. This area is accessible for the public.
