= List of rocket experiments on Zingst =

Coordinates: 54°26′4″N 12°48′11″E

== Rocket Experiments ==
During the Cold War, when the area was a part of East Germany, the eastern part of the Zingst peninsula on the German Baltic Sea coast in Mecklenburg-Western Pomerania was a restricted military area, used for meteorological rocket experiments. Various experiments were conducted between 1970 and 1992 in an area known as Sundi Meadows. There were 5 launches of the Polish rocket Meteor 1E in the early 1970s. On 21 October 1988 launches of Russian of the MMR06-M type rockets began. The restricted area measured just 23.6 kilometres by 25.5 kilometres. As the rockets reached heights up to 80 kilometres, the launch angle of the unguided rockets had to be determined with an accuracy of 2 degrees in order to prevent an impact outside the restricted area.

The first launches of MMR06-M rockets were not successful due to various technical difficulties. The first successful launch with a meteorological payload occurred on 12 April 1989. Additional launches continued for a short time after the fall of the Berlin Wall and German reunification (3 October 1990). They were finally ended on 19 December 1990 for safety and technological reasons.

Nevertheless, between 14 February and 10 April 1992 a total of 19 Russian rockets of the MMR06-M type were launched at Zingst, of which 6 were successful. Although further rockets were still available for testing, the launches of MMR06-M rockets in Zingst were stopped in April 1992 because of the removal of German Federal Armed Forces from the place.

=== List of Launches ===
Date	Time (UTC + 1h)	Rocket type	Mission	Maximum altitude	Duration of transmission	Results
October 21, 1988	14:35	MMR06-M	Experimental	?	8s	EF
November 1, 1988	14:01	MMR06-M	Experimental	67 km	360s/570s	EF
November 4, 1988	14:20	MMR06-M	Experimental	43 km	250s	EF
November 8, 1988	14:11	MMR06-M	Experimental	78 km	637s	EF
November 22, 1988	14:20	MMR06-M	Experimental	53 km	590s	EF
November 23, 1988	14:00	MMR06-M	Experimental	76 km	658s	EF
April 7, 1989	13:00	MMR06-M	Meteorology	72 km	620s	EF
April 14, 1989	13:00	MMR06-M	Meteorology	76 km	4420s	PS
April 26, 1989	13:40	MMR06-M	Meteorology	75 km	4319s	PS
May 10, 1989	13:10	MMR06-M	Meteorology	74 km	4210s	S
May 24, 1989	13:10	MMR06-M	Meteorology	55 km	3299s	PS
June 21, 1989	13:30	MMR06-M	Meteorology	77 km	678s	PS
September 6, 1989	13:38	MMR06-M	Meteorology	74 km	3778s	S
October 10, 1989	14:10	MMR06-M	Meteorology	74 km	3780s	S
October 18, 1989	14:00	MMR06-M	Meteorology	74 km	2489s	PS
November 1, 1989	14:00	MMR06-M	Meteorology	35 km	480s	EF
November 8, 1989	14:10	MMR06-M	Meteorology	73 km	620s	EF
December 8, 1989	14:00	MMR06-M	Meteorology	75 km	3223s	S
December 20, 1989	14:40	MMR06-M	Meteorology	78 km	2205s	S
January 10, 1990	14:00	MMR06-M	Meteorology	75 km	3467s	S
January 19, 1990	14:00	MMR06-M	Meteorology	55 km	514s	EF
February 14, 1990	14:00	MMR06-M	Meteorology	79 km	2437s	PS
March 21, 1990	14:20	MMR06-M	Meteorology	65 km	2655s	PS
March 28, 1990	15:00	MMR06-M	Meteorology	74 km	4296s	S
May 9, 1990	13:00	MMR06-M	Meteorology	74 km	4061s	PS
May 11, 1990	13:00	MMR06-M	Meteorology	74 km	4467s	S
May 30, 1990	13:00	MMR06-M	Meteorology	74 km	4271s	S
June 8, 1990	13:00	MMR06-M	Meteorology	66 km	3242s	S
June 13, 1990	13:00	MMR06-M	Meteorology	76 km	3826s	S
June 20, 1990	13:10	MMR06-M	Meteorology	77 km	4292s	S
September 12, 1990	13:00	MMR06-M	Meteorology	77 km	1260s	PS
September 26, 1990	13:00	MMR06-M	Meteorology	79 km	4010s	PS
October 5, 1990	14:00	MMR06-M	Meteorology	38 km	530s	EF
October 12, 1990	14:00	MMR06-M	Meteorology	53 km	0s	EF
October 17, 1990	14:00	MMR06-M	Meteorology	77 km	1790s	PS
October 17, 1990	14:40	MMR06-M	Meteorology	80 km	1136s	PS
November 2, 1990	14:00	MMR06-M	Meteorology	42 km	592s	EF
November 2, 1990	14:40	MMR06-M	Meteorology	74 km	256s	EF
November 23, 1990	14:00	MMR06-M	Meteorology	68 km	2199s	S
December 5, 1990	14:30	MMR06-M	Meteorology	75 km	605s	EF
December 14, 1990	14:00	MMR06-M	Meteorology	72 km	1900s	PS
December 19, 1990	14:00	MMR06-M	Meteorology	66 km	600s	EF
December 19, 1990	14:30	MMR06-M	Meteorology	71 km	648s	EF
February 14, 1992	8:50	MMR06-M	Meteorology	70 km	3729s	S
February 19, 1992	8:45	MMR06-M	Meteorology	73 km	3992s	S
February 21, 1992	8:30	MMR06-M	Meteorology	77 km	625s	EF
February 26, 1992	8:30	MMR06-M	Meteorology	55 km	1811s	PS
February 26, 1992	9:50	MMR06-M	Meteorology	54 km	3074s	S
February 28, 1992	8:31	MMR06-M	Meteorology	70 km	580s	EF
March 6, 1992	8:32	MMR06-M	Meteorology	49 km	570s	EF
March 6, 1992	9:24	MMR06-M	Meteorology	80 km	625s	EF
March 11, 1992	8:32	MMR06-M	Meteorology	76 km	559s	EF
March 11, 1992	9:27	MMR06-M	Meteorology	74 km	599s	EF
March 20, 1992	8:40	MMR06-M	Meteorology	36 km	535s	EF
March 20, 1992	9:58	MMR06-M	Meteorology	75 km	3993s	S
March 25, 1992	8:32	MMR06-M	Meteorology	51 km	1771s	PS
March 25, 1992	9:25	MMR06-M	Meteorology	?	0s	F
March 27, 1992	8:33	MMR06-M	Meteorology	73 km	4317s	S
April 1, 1992	7:33	MMR06-M	Meteorology	52 km	589s	EF
April 3, 1992	7:30	MMR06-M	Meteorology	-	258s	F
April 3, 1992	8:20	MMR06-M	Meteorology	75 km	595s	EF
April 10, 1992	7:30	MMR06-M	Meteorology	67 km	4054s	S

Remarks: S = Success; PS = Partial Success; F = Failure; EF = Experiment Failure
