= Großenkneten =

- Municipality
- Coat of arms

- Location of Großenkneten within Oldenburg district
- Interactive map of Großenkneten
- Location within Germany Location within Lower Saxony
- Coordinates: 52°57′N 08°16′E
- Country: Germany
- State: Lower Saxony
- District: Oldenburg
- Subdivisions: 19 neighbourhoods

Government
  - Mayor (2020–25): Thorsten Schmidtke (SPD)

Area
  - Total: 176.17 km^{2} (68.02 sq mi)
- Elevation: 37 m (121 ft)

Population (2025-12-31)
  - Total: 15,528
  - Density: 88.142/km^{2} (228.29/sq mi)
- Time zone: UTC+01:00 (CET)
  - Summer (DST): UTC+02:00 (CEST)
- Postal codes: 26197
- Dialling codes: 04435,04487
- Vehicle registration: OL
- Website: www.grossenkneten.de

Großenkneten is a municipality in the district of Oldenburg, in Lower Saxony, Germany.

== Geography ==
Großenkneten is one of the largest municipalities in Germany, in terms of its area, and is situated between the rivers Hunte and Lethe, in the landscape called Wildeshauser Geest. The place – consisting of the villages Huntlosen, Ahlhorn and Großenkneten – is still mostly agrarian, but is becoming more and more popular as a place of residence for commuters to Oldenburg.

== Neighborhoods ==
Großenkneten is divided in 19 neighborhoods (Ortsteile), which are (with population of 2012): Ahlhorn (6.441), Amelhausen (120), Bakenhus (48), Bissel (319), Döhlen (461), Großenkneten (2.637), Hagel (32), Halenhorst (237), Haschenbrok (79), Hengstlage (136), Hespenbusch-Pallast (78), Hosüne (569), Huntlosen (1.831), Husum (60), Sage (623), Sage-Haast (290), Sannum (217), Steinloge (128) and Westrittrum (106).

== History ==
In 1933 the municipality Huntlosen was incorporated into Großenkneten, giving it its current extent.

Between 1952 and 1957 Karl Poggensee and his association DAFRA (the precursor of the Hermann Oberth Society) operated a small launch site for experimental rockets close to the Hespenbusch farm. In 1957 the launch site was shifted to Cuxhaven as the site in Großenkneten had become too small.

The band Trio, formed in Großenkneten in 1979, had a hit in more than 30 countries with their song "Da Da Da" in 1982. They prominently featured the town name on the cover of their debut album.

== Notable places ==
Special recreational locations include several prehistoric tombs and the fish lakes of Ahlhorn. Originally built in the 1880s as a fish farm using the waters of the river Lethe, they have been a nature preserve since 1993. Of the 2 square kilometres of water around 1.2 square kilometres are still used for fish farming today.
