= Mohr Rocket =

Sounding rocket developed in Germany in the 1950s

The Mohr Rocket was a sounding rocket developed by Ernst Mohr in Wuppertal, Germany.

It was a single stage solid fuel rocket with:

- a length of 1.7 metres,
- a total mass of 150 kg (75 kg propellant),
- a lift-off thrust of 76.5 kN and a diameter of 0.3 m.
- a payload, which could weigh up to 5 kg (this was stored in a dart with a mass of 15 kg, a maximum diameter of 5.6 centimetres and a length of 1.25 metres.)

The burn time of the engine was 2 seconds. After the burnout of the engine the dart was separated from the rocket. Dart and rocket had an altitude of 1200 m and a speed of 1200 m/s when separated after burnout. The dart flew without further propulsion up to a height of 50 kilometres, because of its good aerodynamic design, while the rocket, which was not so well designed aerodynamically, reached a lesser height and fell to the ground near the launchpad.

The first launch attempt was planned on August 24, 1957, near Cuxhaven, but cancelled because of bad weather. On June 8, 1958, the first launch attempts were made, but failed, because two rockets hung on the launcher and the third was unstable in flight. The next launch attempt of three further rockets on September 14, 1958, was successful. The rockets reached the desired height of 50 km.

== See also ==
- Rocket experiments in the area of Cuxhaven
