= Hasselkopf =

Mountain in the Harz, Germany

Highest point
- Elevation: 612 m (2,008 ft)
- Coordinates: 51°42′43″N 10°37′03″E

Naming
- Pronunciation: German: [ˈhasəlkɔpf]

Geography
- Location: Lower Saxony, Germany
- Parent range: Harz

Hasselkopf is a mountain on the southern periphery of Braunlage, Germany. It is 612 m high, known for its beginner-friendly ski slope, tobogganing, hiking trails, and beautiful views, especially appealing to families and winter sports novices, though the ski lift reliability can vary. It offers winter fun with easy slopes and summer activities like hiking directly from accommodations, providing a versatile experience in the scenic Harz National Park.

The hill is mostly covered in grass and undeveloped, but its northern slope has a short ski lift and can be used for downhill skiing in the winter months.

On 7 May 1964, the hill was used by Gerhard Zucker to unsuccessfully attempt to demonstrate the use of mail rockets. One exploded in an accident, killing three.
