= Cirrus (rocket) =

- Country of origin: German
- Date: September 16, 1961
- Designer: Hermann Oberth Society

meteorological rocket

The Cirrus is a sounding rocket with two stages, developed by the "Hermann Oberth Society". Its only launches were both on September 16, 1961, at Cuxhaven. The maximum height of the Cirrus, depending on the version, is 35 kilometres with a single stage or 50 kilometres for the 2 stage version.

A Cirrus rocket is exhibited at the Hermann Oberth Space Travel Museum in Feucht, Germany.
