= Dart (rocketry) =

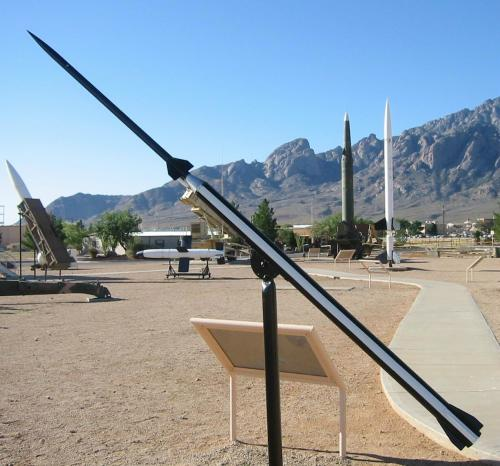
- The sounding rocket Loki with dart

sounding rocket

A dart is the free flying final stage of a sounding rocket, and contains the payload. Its form is very aerodynamically designed. After the launch stage burned out the dart is detached and continues to rise only with its own inertia.

Some sounding rockets are available both with or without dart. The version without a dart is able to transport more payload, but reaches lesser height.

== Applications ==
- Mohr Rocket
- MMR06
- Hopi Dart
- Loki-Dart
- Meteor
- Mesquito
