= Hermann Oberth Space Travel Museum =

Museum in Museum im Landkreis Nürnberger Land in Bavaria

Coordinates: 49°22′30″N 11°12′42″E

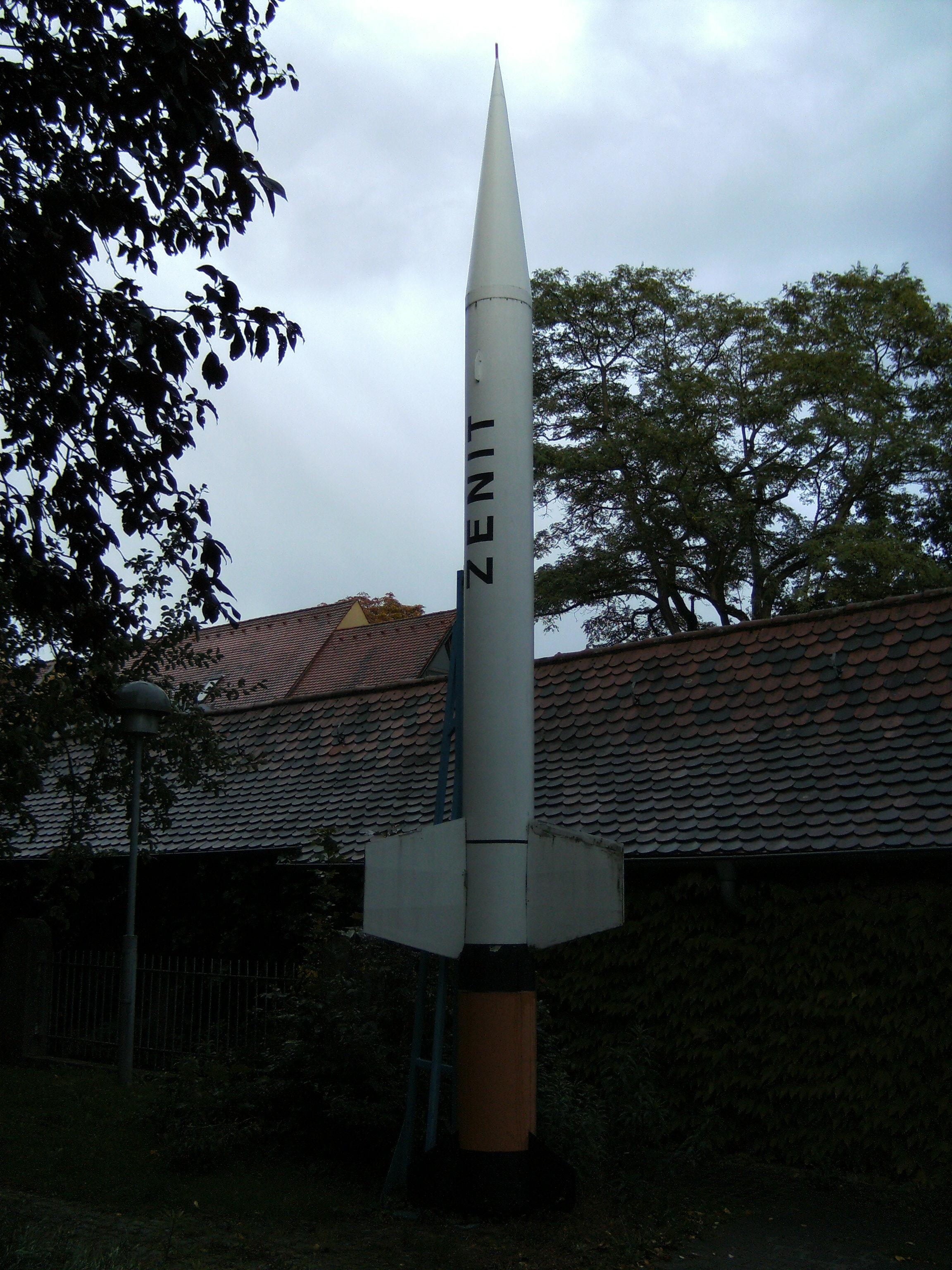
Zenit rocket on display in front of Hermann-Oberth-Museum, Feucht, Germany

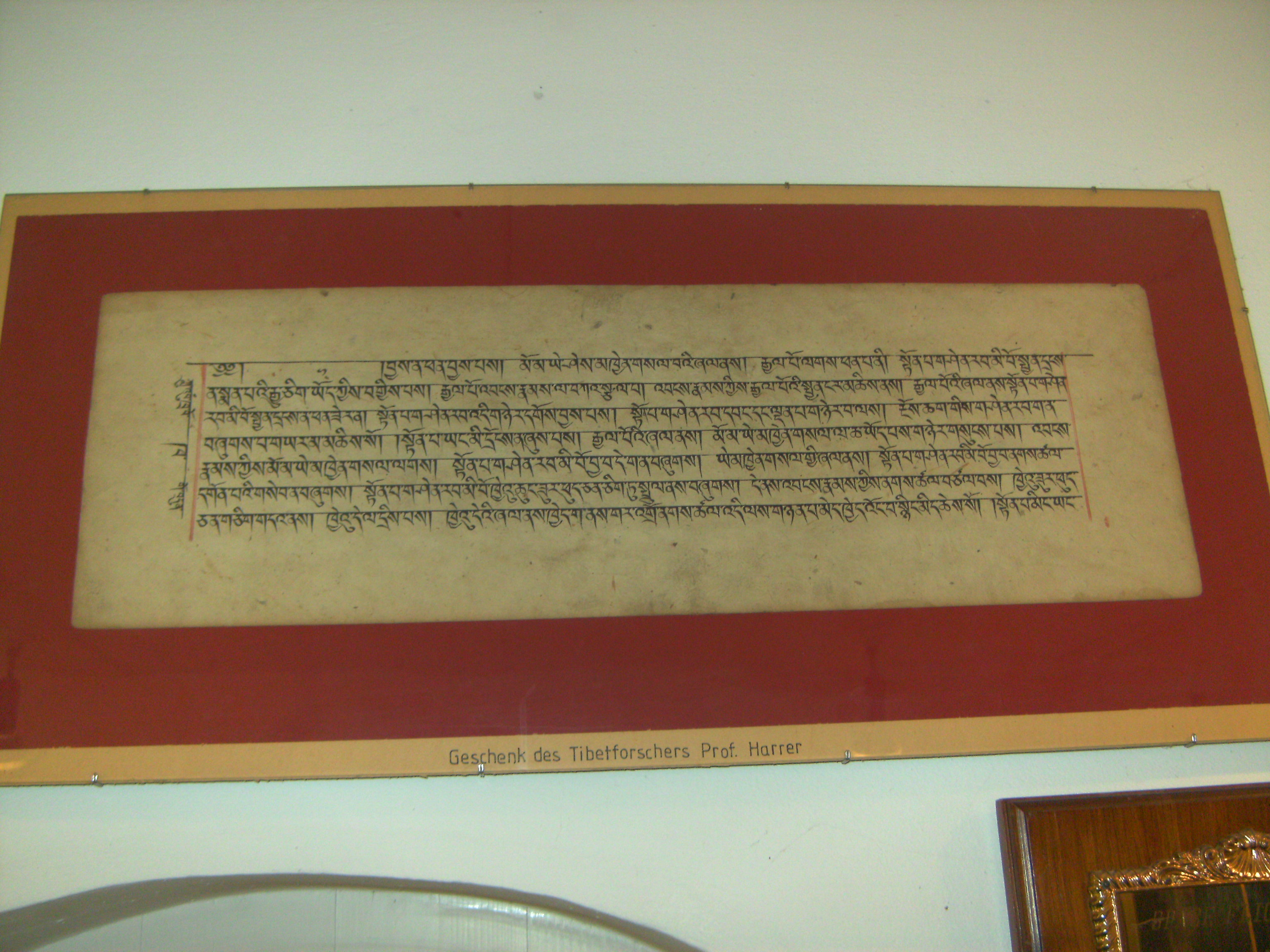
Text written in Sanskrit, in which Tibetans purportedly claim contact with extraterrestrial intelligent life. On display in Hermann-Oberth-Museum, Feucht, Germany

The Hermann Oberth Space Travel Museum (Hermann-Oberth-Raumfahrt-Museum, or Hermann-Oberth-Museum for short) is a museum of space technology in the Franconian city of Feucht in Bavaria, Germany.

It commemorates the life work of the famous visionary and rocket pioneer Hermann Oberth. Exhibits include a Kumulus rocket and a Cirrus rocket, which were developed at the beginning of the 1960s by the Hermann Oberth Society and launched near Cuxhaven, Germany. A Swiss Zenit sounding rocket is also on display in front of the museum.
