= Erna Roth Oberth =

Erna Roth-Oberth (February 27, 1922, Schäßburg (Sighișoara), Transylvania – August 23, 2012, Feucht) was a Transylvanian-German lawyer, a daughter of Hermann Oberth. From 1953, she worked as a lawyer, assisted her father in completing his business affairs and in publishing his works. In 1969, she co-founded the Salzburg International Space Agency, Hermann Oberth - Wernher von Braun (IFR) in Salzburg, and was its vice president for many years. In 1971, together with her husband Josef Roth, she founded the Hermann Oberth Space Museum (HORM) in Feucht near Nuremberg with the aim of illustrating the development of space technology.
