= The Rocket Post =

2004 film by Stephen Whittaker

- Directed by: Stephen Whittaker
- Written by: James MacInnes; William Morrissey
- Starring: Ulrich Thomsen; Shauna Macdonald; Kevin McKidd; Patrick Malahide
- Cinematography: Richard Greatrex
- Distributed by: Ultimate Pictures
- Release dates: 22 July 2004 (Stony Brooks Film Festival); 24 November 2006
- Running time: 112 minutes
- Country: United Kingdom
- Language: English

The Rocket Post is a 2004 British drama film directed by Stephen Whittaker and starring Ulrich Thomsen, Shauna Macdonald, Kevin McKidd and Patrick Malahide. It is set on a remote Scottish island during the late 1930s. The arrival of German rocket scientist Gerhard Zucker is not initially welcomed by the inhabitants of the island.

The film was shot in 2001 on Taransay, but its release was delayed by several years. Additional footage was shot in 2005, and the film was given a limited release in Scotland the following year.

The story is very loosely based on experiments in 1934 by the German inventor Gerhard Zucker to provide a postal service to the island of Scarp by rocket mail.The film's original score was composed by Nigel Clarke & Michael Csányi-Wills and recorded by the Royal Philharmonic Orchestra in London.

== Plot ==
Two German rocket scientists are unable to obtain funding for their experiments from the German Government. They travel to Scarp, an island in the Outer Hebrides of Scotland. Their experiments initially end in disastrous failure. Over time one of the scientists, Heinz Dombrowsky is fed up with the primitive living conditions and returns to Germany where rocketry has obtained the interest of the Third Reich. Things look up for the remaining scientist Gerhard Zucker when he falls in love with a local lass and a local handyman improves his rockets to successfully keep them from exploding.

Germany desires Gerhard to return to Germany, sending a U-Boat to abduct him.

== Cast ==
- Ulrich Thomsen as Gerhard Zucker
- Shauna Macdonald as Catherine Mackay
- Gary Lewis as Jimmy Roach
- Kevin McKidd as Thomas McKinnon
- Patrick Malahide as Charles Ilford
- Eddie Marsan as Heinz Dombrowsky
- Clive Russell as Angus MacKay
- Jimmy Yuill as James MacLeod
- Ian McNeice as Alex Miln
- John Wood as Sir Wilson Ramsay
- Niall Maclennan as James Maclennan
- Alasdair Maclennan as Paul Maclennan
- Tim Barlow as Hector McDougal
- Iain MacRae as Islander 1
- Lewis Iain MacNeill as Islander 2
