= Gerhard Zucker =

German businessman and rocket engineer (1908–1985)

Gerhard Zucker (1908–1985) was a German businessman and rocket engineer.

== Biography ==
Born in Hasselfelde, he first came to public notice in 1931, when he began to work on the problem of transporting mail by rocket. In 1933 he performed several experiments in the Harz and at Cuxhaven. In 1934, he emigrated to the UK, where he attempted to interest the British government in his rocket.

After a failed rocket demonstration for officials of the British Royal Mail on 31 July 1934, he was deported to Germany, where he was arrested on suspicion of cooperating with the British. During World War II he served in the Luftwaffe.

After World War II, he moved across the border to West Germany, to the part of the Harz in Lower Saxony, where he became a furniture dealer. He continued his rocket experiments until, at a rocket demonstration on 7 May 1964 on the Hasselkopf Mountain near Braunlage, an accident occurred which killed three people. This accident led to a ban on civilian rocket research in West Germany, ending the rocket experiments of the Hermann-Oberth-Gesellschaft (Hermann Oberth Society) and the Berthold Seliger Forschungs- und Entwicklungsgesellschaft mbH (Berhold Seliger Research and Development Society).

In the 1970s Gerhard Zucker once again began launching mail rockets.

== Zucker in popular culture ==
A film based on Zucker's attempts with mail rockets at Scarp was released in 2004, called The Rocket Post, starring Ulrich Thomsen as Zucker.

In October 2011, Canadian Wilfred Ashley McIsaac resurrected the Zucker legacy in eastern Ontario, Canada after launching a scale solid fuel ARCAS rocket with Gerhard Zucker 'First Canadian Rocket-Flight' stamps on board. Zucker himself produced the postal stamps for a May 1936 exhibit in New York City. The stamps were never used until McIsaac launched them 75 years later on 31 October 2011.
