= Operation Backfire (World War II) =

British military scientific operation after World War II

External images
- Operation Backfire
- Cuxhaven
- detailed map of the launch site
- main assembly hall
- outside view
- inside view
- watchers
- Operation log 1
- Operation log 2
- official report
- German organisation for the Operation Backfire
- further images

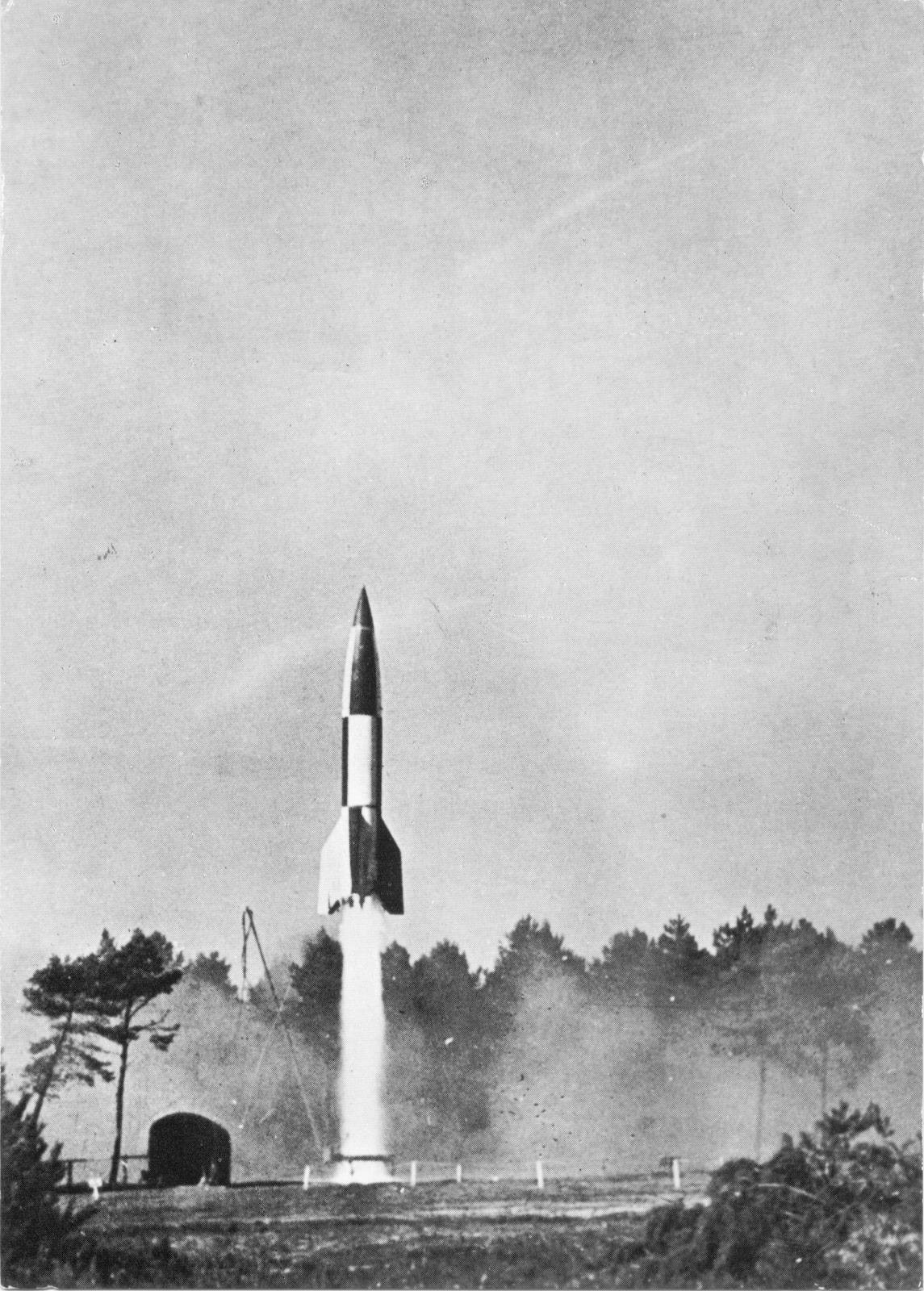
A German V-2 rocket fired by the British during Operation Backfire (1945)

Operation Backfire was a military scientific operation of the Western Allies during and after the Second World War that was performed mainly by British personnel. The operation was designed to completely evaluate the entire V-2 rocket assembly, interrogate German personnel specialized in all phases of it, and then to test and launch missiles across the North Sea.

== Background ==
With the end of the war, the Allies scrambled to acquire German technology. Several military operations had been previously mounted by the British to complete this task, including the Fedden Mission and Operation Surgeon. With the consent of U.S. General Dwight D. Eisenhower, Operation Backfire was orchestrated by Major Robert Staver of the Rocket Section of the Research and Development branch of the Ordnance Office, which had been tasked in directing the effort to find and interrogate the German rocket specialists who had built the V-2. Since 30 April 1945, Major Staver had been in the Nordhausen area searching the smaller laboratories for V-2 technicians. Auxiliary Territorial Service (ATS) Junior Commander Joan Bernard also played a role in this operation.

== Backfire ==
For this operation, three or possibly four V-2 rockets were launched during October 1945 from a launch pad at 53°50′50″N 8°35′32″E north-east of Arensch near Cuxhaven within the British Occupation zone in Germany in order to demonstrate the weapon to Allied personnel.

The Americans had already taken away most of the V2 rocket technology from the German underground Mittelwerk factory at the Mittelbau-Dora concentration camp near Nordhausen. Before the Soviets took control of that area, the British were given the opportunity to gather material. They were able to assemble parts sufficient to build eight V2 rockets. Some parts were still missing and there was a search throughout Germany. Some 400 railway cars and 70 Lancaster flights were used to bring some 250,000 parts and 60 specialized vehicles to Cuxhaven, the most elusive parts being electrical batteries to operate the guidance gyros. The US supplied some tail assemblies from those that they had taken. Many of the rockets and the hydrogen peroxide fuel used in the operation were provided by T-Force, a secretive British Army unit that had, in spring and summer 1945, searched for German military technology and scientists.

The handling and launch procedures were unknown, so German personnel were ordered to perform these, which for the most part they did willingly. The launches were filmed and because the personnel wore their original uniforms and the rockets were painted as in their original livery, this footage (often used for documentaries) has been mistaken for footage of wartime German launches.

=== Launches ===
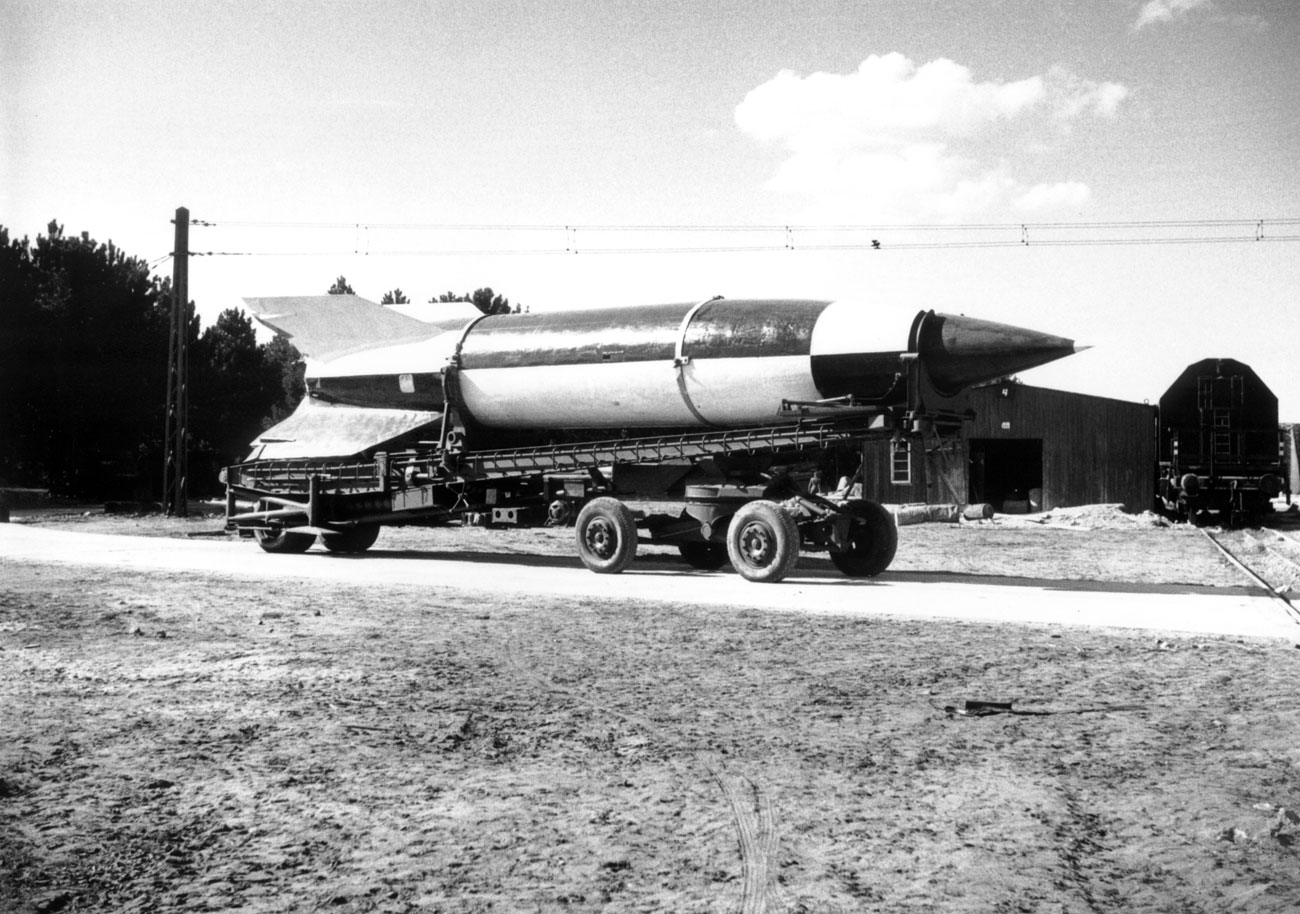
A4-Rocket of Operation Backfire near Cuxhaven (1945)

Date	Time	Maximum height	Length of flight	Remarks
2 October 1945	14:41	69.4 kilometres (43.1 mi)	249.4 kilometres (155.0 mi)	
4 October 1945	14:16	17.4 kilometres (10.8 mi)	24 kilometres (15 mi)	Engine failure shortly after launch.
15 October 1945	15:06	64 kilometres (40 mi)	233 kilometres (145 mi)	Some sources indicate the launch took place on 14 October.

According to the Report on Operation Backfire, there were three Cuxhaven launches. Backfire Rocket One was prepared for launch on 1 October 1945, but did not function. Backfire Rocket Two was prepared for launch on 2 October 1945 and was launched without difficulty. The second Cuxhaven launch took place on 4 October 1945 with Backfire Rocket One. A third and final rocket was launched for representatives of the press and Allies on 15 October 1945 under the name Operation Clitterhouse. According to one site, there was a fourth launch on 17 October 1945 that reached an altitude of about 80 kilometres (50 mi).

== Aftermath ==
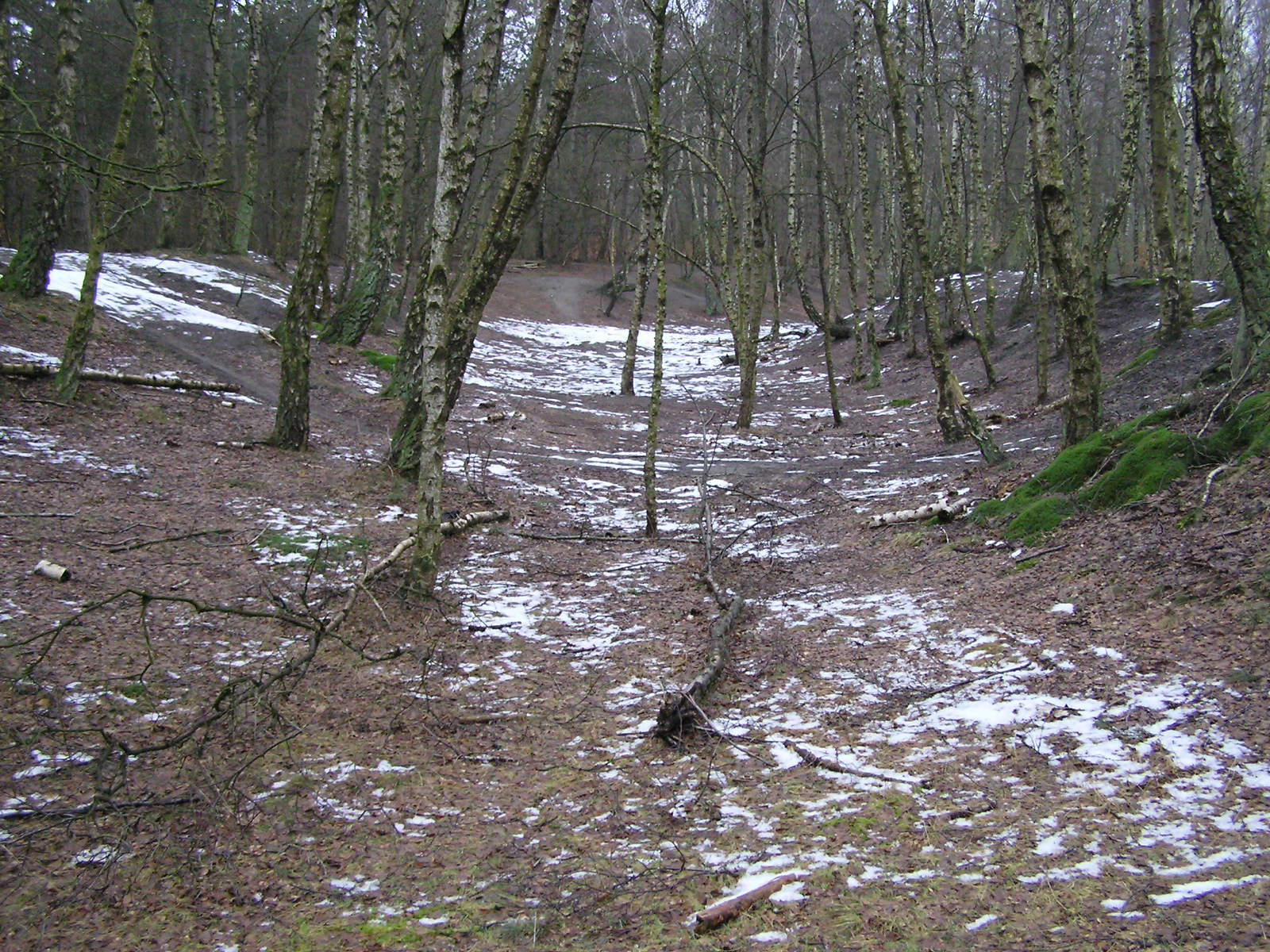
Present day site of the V2 launch tests in the Werner forest near Cuxhaven

For these launches, the British recruited German personnel, even those transferred from US custody and due to be returned, to assist with this missile programme.

The technical aspects of the operation were detailed in a five-volume report.

At the site of the former launchpad there is a trough and some remnants of shelters.

== See also ==
- Anglo-Australian Joint Project
- Arthur Rudolph
- Operation Paperclip
- Remnants of launchpads in Germany
- Rocket experiments in the area of Cuxhaven
