= Mesquito =

- The Mesquito sounding rocket
- Function: Sounding rocket
- Manufacturer: NSROC
- Country of origin: United States

Launch history
- Status: Retired
- Launch sites: LC-2, Wallops Island
- Total launches: 3
- Success(es): 2
- Failure: 1
- First flight: 6 May 2008

The Mesquito is an American sounding rocket vehicle developed for the NASA Sounding Rocket Program on Wallops Island, Virginia. The Mesquito was developed to provide rocket-borne measurements of the mesospheric region of the upper atmosphere. An area of great science interest is in the 82–95 km region, where the conventional understanding of atmospherics physics is being challenged.

The Mesquito is a two-stage sounding rocket using a 9-inch-diameter (229 mm) solid propellant rocket motor from surplus M26 MLRS artillery rocket as the first-stage. The non-propulsive second-stage dart contains a free-flying structural body that includes an avionics suite and an experiment space with interface.

The maiden flight occurred on 6 May, 2008, from LC-2 at the Wallops Flight Facility. After three test launches, the project was shelved.

== Launch history ==
Date	Time (GMT)	S/N	Mission	Apogee	Outcome	Remarks
2008-05-06	18:08	12.065	Test	85 km	Success	Maiden flight
2008-05-07	19:18	12.066	Test	15 km	Failure	Loss of control following burnout
2009-12-16	13:46	12.068	Test	90 km	Success	Dart pinned to first stage
