= Seliger Rocket =

Seliger Rocket is the designation for the sounding rockets of the Berthold Seliger Forschungs- und Entwicklungsgesellschaft mbH. They were

1. A single-stage rocket with a length of 3.4 metres and a takeoff thrust of 50 kN. This rocket was first launched on November 19, 1962, near Cuxhaven and reached a height of 40 km.
2. A two-stage rocket with a length of 6 metres and a takeoff thrust of 50 kN. This rocket was first launched on February 7, 1963, and reached a height of 80 km.
3. A three-stage rocket with a length of 12.8 metres, a diameter of 0.56 metres and a takeoff thrust of 50 kN. This rocket was first launched on May 2, 1963, with reduced fuel and reached an altitude of 120 km. Later with maximum fuel it reached a height of 150 km.

All Seliger Rockets return to the ground by parachute. The single-stage version was completely reusable. Additional single and two-stage rockets were developed in 1963, which could be also used for military purposes. There were flight demonstrations of these rockets to military representatives of non-NATO countries on December 5, 1963.

== See also ==
- Rocket experiments in the area of Cuxhaven
