= MMR06 =

Soviet sounding rocket

The MMR06 is a Soviet/Russian rocket for meteorological experiments, with a length of 3.48 metres and a total weight of 130 kg. The MMR06 rocket was built in two versions: One version had a conical top, the second one, named MMR06-M, had a detachable free flying top, also called dart. The maximum flight height was about 60 - 80 kilometres. Between 1988 and 1992 62 rockets of the type MMR06-M were launched from the former NVA exercise area Zingst, in order to accomplish wind and temperature measurements in the upper atmosphere.

== Technical data of MMR06-M ==
=== Total ===
Total mass	134 ±5 kg
Mass empty	58 kg
Fuel mass	78 kg
Length	4.14 m
Distance from end of nozzle to center of gravity at launch	1.445 m
Distance from end of nozzle to center of gravity at burn-out (Brennschluss)	1.872 m
Distance from end of nozzle to center of wind pressure	1 m
Axial moment of inertia at launch	0.87 kg/m^{2}
Axial moment of inertia at burn-out	0.25 kg/m^{2}
Equatorial moment of inertia at launch	394.5 kg/m^{2}
Equatorial moment of inertia at burn-out	158.5 kg/m^{2}

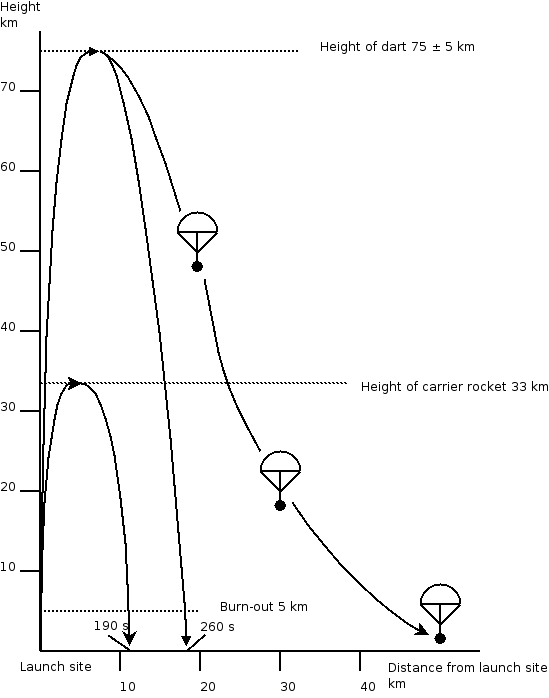
schematic flight path of MMR06-M rocket

=== Aerodynamic coefficients ===
C_{d} (drag coefficient)	0.42
C_{l} (lift coefficient)	20
C_{m}	34.4
Burn-out velocity	1428 m/s
Rotational velocity of rocket around own axis	800 rpm

=== Rocket engine ===
Mass with payload	121.8 kg
Mass without payload with transition piece	38 kg
Mass without payload without transition piece	33 kg
Length with transition piece	2.813 m
Length without transition piece	2.444 m
Time of burn-out	7.2 s - 12 s
Diameter	0.2 m
Wing span	0.6 m
Angle of attack of wings	5' - 40'

=== Dart ===
Mass	12.2 kg
Length	1.478 m
Diameter	0.063 m
Distance from end of dart to center of gravity	0.78 m
Distance from end of dart to center of wind pressure	0.5 m
Axial moment of inertia	0.00752 kg/m^{2}
Equatorial moment of inertia	3.48 kg/m^{2}
Wing span	0.148 m
Angle of attack between wings and longitudinal axis	0°
Velocity at expulsion of probe	3.65 m/s
Aerodynamic coefficients
C_{d}	0.15
C_{l}	20
C_{m}	34.4

=== Parachute system ===
Mass	1 kg
Time of expulsion	130 s

== Launch sites ==
=== Ship ===
- Musson
- Ushakov
- Ernst Krenkel
- Priliv
- Volna

=== Land ===
- Kapustin Yar
- Molodyozhnaya Station
- Zingst
