= Hitchhiker 2 =

- Mission type: Technology
- Operator: USAF
- COSPAR ID: 1963-042B
- SATCAT no.: 682

Spacecraft properties
- Bus: P-11
- Manufacturer: Lockheed Martin / MIT
- Launch mass: 60 kilograms (130 lb)

Start of mission
- Launch date: October 29, 1963, 21:19 UTC
- Rocket: Thor SLV-2A Agena D 386
- Launch site: Vandenberg SLC-1W

End of mission
- Deactivated: May 23, 1965

Orbital parameters
- Reference system: Geocentric
- Regime: Low Earth
- Eccentricity: 0.02201
- Perigee altitude: 285 kilometres (177 mi)
- Apogee altitude: 585 kilometres (364 mi)
- Inclination: 89.9°
- Period: 93.4 minutes
- Epoch: October 29, 1963

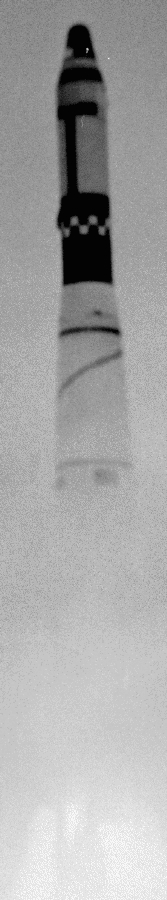
Launch of Hitchhiker 2.

Hitchhiker 2 (or P-11 4202, P-11 AS and OPS 3316) was a satellite launched by U.S. Air Force. It was launched with the aim of studying and measuring cosmic radiation. The satellite was the second successful satellite of the P-11 program, following the failure of the first Hitchhiker satellite in March 1963. It was launched on October 29, 1963 from Vandenberg Air Force Base, California, on a Thor-Agena launch vehicle.

On May 23, 1965, the satellite re-entered the Earth's atmosphere.

== Instruments ==
- 1 Geiger tube (40-4 MeV)
- 1 Faraday cup plasma
- 1 Electron detector (0.3-5.0 MeV)
- 1 Proton detector (0.7-5.3 MeV)
- 2 electrostatic analysers (4-100 keV)

== See also ==
- Corona program
