= Seliger Forschungs- und Entwicklungsgesellschaft mbH =

Defunct German aeronautical research & development company (1961–64)

The Berthold Seliger Forschungs- und Entwicklungsgesellschaft mbH (BSFEGmbH) was a company founded by West German rocket technical designer Berthold Seliger in 1961. Seliger was a former assistant theoretician professor Dr. Eugen Sänger. The company developed and built prototypes of sounding rockets and launched them near Cuxhaven. The BSFEGmbH cooperated strongly with the Hermann-Oberth-Gesellschaft, of which Berthold Seliger was a member. The first rocket developed by the BSFEGmbH was an improved version of the Kumulus, which was first launched on 19 November 1962 and reached a height of 50 kilometres. On 7 February 1963 the BSFEGmbH launched a two-stage rocket with a maximum height of 80 kilometres and, on 2 May 1963, they launched a three-stage rocket with a maximum flight height of more than 100 kilometres. The latter rocket may have attained the highest flight altitude of all rockets built in post-war Germany. The signals from all these rockets were also received at the observatory in Bochum (300 km SSW of Cuxhaven). After May 1963 the BSFEGmbH worked on the improvement of the steering system of their rockets and thought also on military usable rockets.

On 5 December 1963 the BSFEGmbH gave a flight demonstration of their rockets to military staff of non-NATO-countries. Although their rockets were launched with reduced amount of propellant in order not to violate Allied laws concerning the development of military rockets in Germany and were not fit for military use, the rocket experiments of the Hermann-Oberth-Gesellschaft e.V. and the BSFEGmbH after this date were viewed with great suspicion.

In 1964, these experiments were discontinued with a temporary injunction, which is still valid today, after a fatal accident at a rocket demonstration by Gerhard Zucker at Braunlage, although Gerhard Zucker did not cooperate with the BSFEGmbH or the Hermann-Oberth-Gesellschaft e.V. in any way and also had a bad reputation with the members of these societies.

== Products ==
- Seliger Rocket
