= Kumulus =

1960 prototype rocket

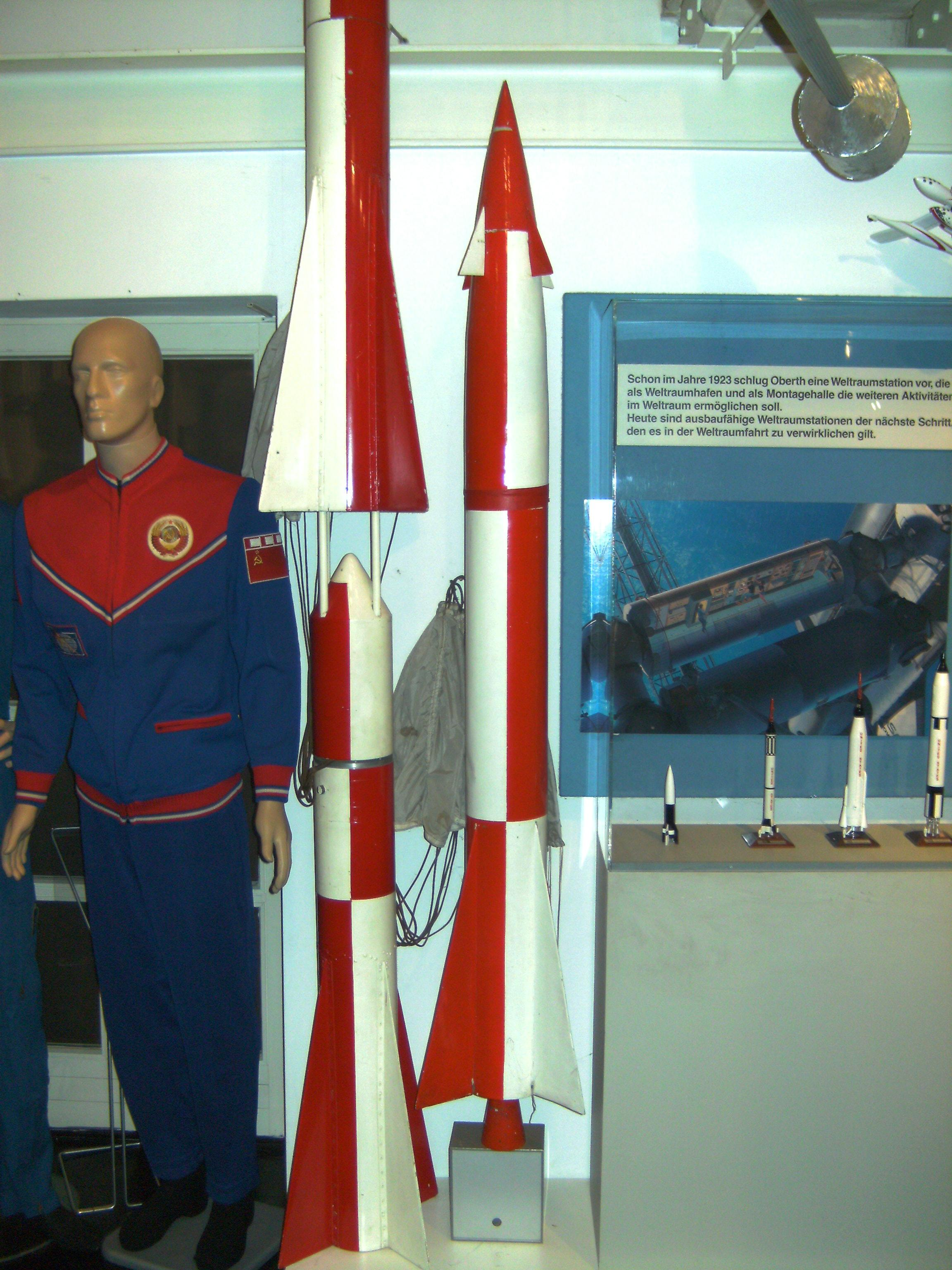
Kumulus rocket at the Hermann Oberth Museum in Feucht

Kumulus is the name of a rocket of the "Hermann-Oberth-Gesellschaft e.V.". The first Kumulus rocket was launched on December 20, 1960, near Cuxhaven. A Kumulus rocket is on display at the Hermann Oberth Space Travel Museum in Feucht.

== Technical data ==
- Diameter: 15 cm
- Length: 3 m
- Thrust: 5 kN
- Maximum height: 20 km
- Payload: 5 kg (for 20 km altitude)
- Launch mass: 60 kg
- Mass without fuel and payload: 28 kg
