= Oberthal =

Oberthal may refer to the following places:

- Oberthal, Saarland, Germany
- Oberthal, Switzerland
