= Ernst Mohr =

20th-century German engineer and rocket scientist

Ernst Mohr was a professor of mechanical engineering at the University of Wuppertal. He developed the meteorological Mohr Rocket, on behalf of the German Rocket Society. The rocket was first launched successfully on September 14, 1958 near Cuxhaven.

At the first successful test the rocket reached heights of 50 kilometers and could send out its payload at speeds of 1.2 km per second.
