= Hespenbusch =

Coordinates: 52°56′20″N 8°18′45″E

Hespenbusch is a farm, which belongs to the municipality of Grossenkneten. Karl Poggensee and the Hermann Oberth society (succeeded by the DAFRA, German work company for affairs of rocket) operated between 1952 and 1957 a launch site for small rockets with a maximum flight level of some kilometers, close to this farm. In 1957 the launch activities were shifted toward Cuxhaven, since the available area became too small.
