= Feucht =

- Municipality
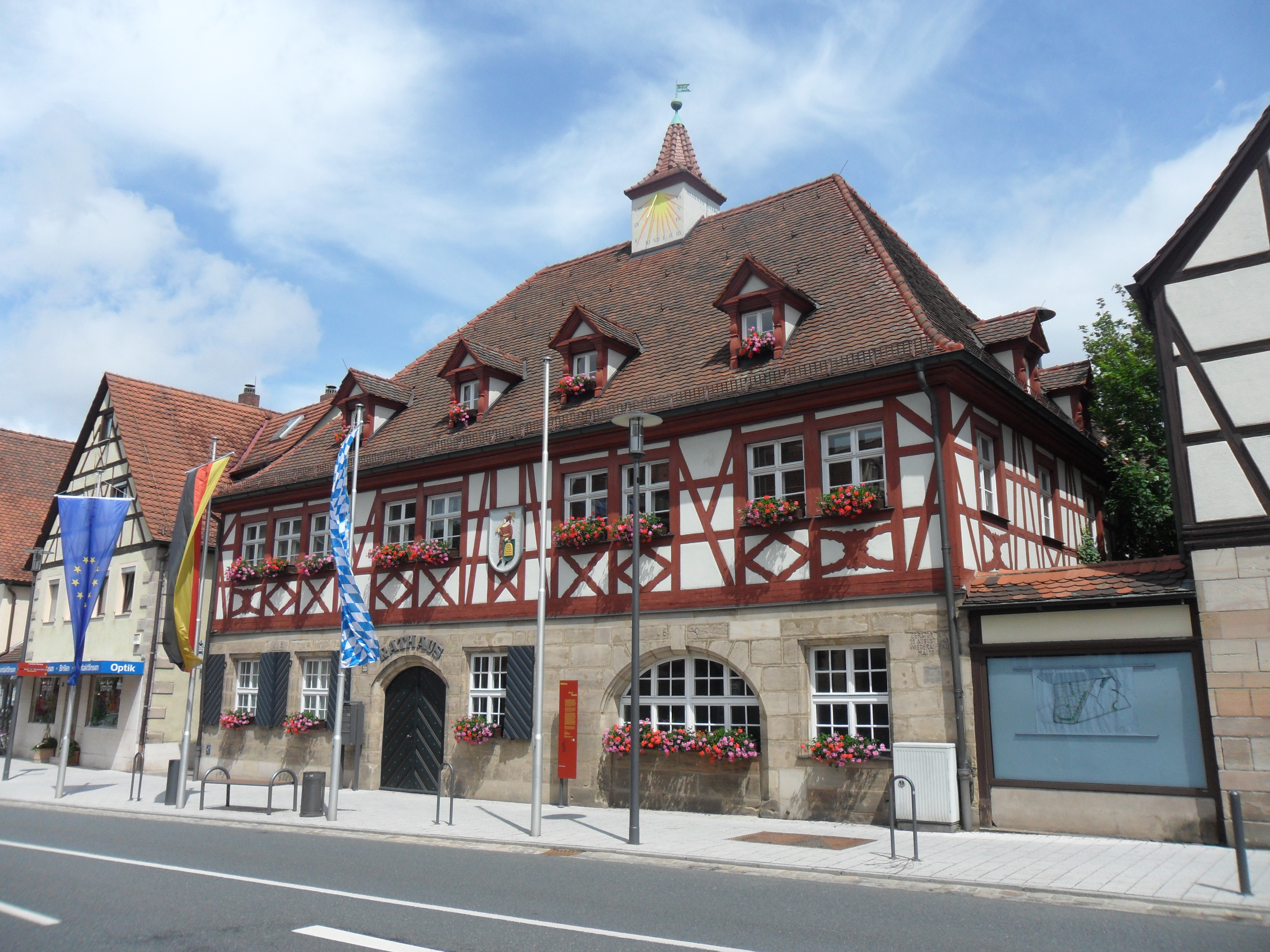
- Town hall

- Coat of arms

- Location of Feucht within Nürnberger Land district
- Interactive map of Feucht
- Location within Germany Location within Bavaria
- Coordinates: 49°22′32.63″N 11°12′46.75″E
- Country: Germany
- State: Bavaria
- Admin. region: Mittelfranken
- District: Nürnberger Land
- Subdivisions: 5 Ortsteile

Government
  - Mayor (2020–26): Jörg Kotzur (SPD)

Area
  - Total: 9.8 km^{2} (3.8 sq mi)
- Elevation: 358 m (1,175 ft)

Population (2025-12-31)
  - Total: 13,604
  - Density: 1,400/km^{2} (3,600/sq mi)
- Time zone: UTC+01:00 (CET)
  - Summer (DST): UTC+02:00 (CEST)
- Postal codes: 90537
- Dialling codes: 09128
- Vehicle registration: LAU, ESB, HEB, N, PEG
- Website: www.feucht.de

Feucht (German pronunciation: [fɔʏçt]) is a market town and municipality southeast of Nuremberg in the district of Nürnberger Land in Bavaria, Germany. The name "Feucht" is derived from the Old High German noun "viuhtje" - "fichta", which is the spruce tree (vernacularly Féichdn). As of 31 December 2019, Feucht had a population of 14,050. Hermann Oberth (1894–1989), one of the early fathers of space travel, lived for many years and died in Feucht.

== History ==
Since the Middle Ages Feucht has been a centre for beekeeping and honey production referred to as Zeidlerei. Lebkuchen, the famous gingerbread of Nuremberg, is based on honey from Feucht. Feucht was also the location of the kaserne of the U.S. Army's 4th Squadron/2nd Armored Cavalry Regiment (Aviation), until its recall to Fort Lewis, Washington in 1992 during the drawdown of the USAREUR.

== Points of interest ==
=== Culture ===
- Hermann Oberth Space Travel Museum - This small museum is located at Pfinzingstrasse 12-14 and is open on weekends. It features some books, models, awards and recognitions which belonged to Hermann Oberth. There are also some rocket engines and models which explain various aspects of space travel.
- Zeidel-Museum - Pfinzingstrasse 6, open on Sunday afternoons from 1:30 to 5:30 is a museum about the history and production of honey, which has a long history in Feucht. It was one of the main ingredients in Lebkuchen, a product of nearby Nuremberg.

=== Business ===
The biggest industrial businesses in Feucht are Excella (pharma), ATOTECH, (Electronic) and Fella (agricultural forage harvesting machinery).

=== Recreation ===
Feucht is home to a couple of small lakes. Its location near the Imperial Woods makes it a popular destination for hiking, cycling and outdoor recreation.

=== Sports ===
In addition to the traditional sports clubs, TSV 04 Feucht with 14 departments and 1. SC Feucht (soccer and bowling), groups for motor sports, cycling, equestrian sports, hiking, shooting and martial arts have also been established.

Soccer plays a major role in both of these clubs. The 1. SC Feucht played in the then third-class Regionalliga Süd from 2003 to 2005 and in the fifth-class Bayernliga Nord in the 2022/23 season. In the TSV 04 Feucht the volleyball team is successful and the women play in the Bayernliga.

The Bogenschützen Feucht e.V. is an archery club in Feucht, which is well-known beyond the boundaries of the market town. It operates a training ground outside Feucht and a hall with ten shooting lanes built in 2010. The medal winner of the 2020 Summer Olympics in Tokyo, Charline Schwarz, is a member of the club.

== Transport ==
Feucht has numerous bus stops throughout the town and is serviced by VGN/VAG bus line with direct service to Nuremberg.

Feucht is located on the Autobahn A9 (motorway / interstate) and the Federal Highway B8.

Feucht has a station on the Nuremberg–Regensburg line and is served by both RB regional trains and Nuremberg S-Bahn trains.
