= Hermann-Oberth-Gesellschaft =

German association in support of rocketry

Hermann Oberth Society
- Formation: 1952
- Founder: Karl Poggensee
- Type: Nonprofit
- Headquarters: Bremen, Germany

The Hermann Oberth Gesellschaft (1952–1993) was an association named after Hermann Oberth, the German astronautics pioneer and the authoritative expert on rocketry outside the United States, which develops and builds rockets and trains engineers in space technology.

The association was founded on the initiative of the german rocket pioneer Karl Poggensee (1909-1980) on September 21, 1952 by eleven rocket specialists as the Deutsche Agentur für Raumfahrtangelegenheiten (DAFRA) under the motto "to promote the peaceful exploration and development of space". Its founders were of the opinion that the company they had set up should be dedicated to developing rockets and using them exclusively for peaceful purposes, and that the Federal Republic of Germany should make a contribution to space research. August Friedrich Staats was elected chairman. In the early days, various test rockets were developed in Hespenbusch near Grossenkneten, which soon reached heights of a few kilometers, so that the area available in Hespenbusch became too small.

In 1956, DAFRA was accepted as a member of the IAF at the 7th Congress of the International Astronautical Federation (IAF) in Rome. On the eve of the 1958 DAFRA conference, it was decided to transform DAFRA into the Deutsche Raketen-Gesellschaft (DRG) and to set up the first German Commission for Space Research. The chairman of DAFRA, August Friedrich Staats, was elected president of the DRG, and in 1960 he became vice president of the IAF.

In 1957 the rocket tests of the Deutsche Raketen-Gesellschaft (DRG) were relocated to the Wadden area of Cuxhaven. There in 1959 some mail rockets were launched by the DRG. In December 1960, the first launch of the single-stage high-altitude rocket Kumulus took place with a peak altitude of 20 kilometers and on September 16, 1961, the first launch of the two-stage high-altitude rocket Cirrus with a peak altitude of 50 kilometers.

At this time Berthold Seliger began to build rockets in this society (DRG). In 1961 Berthold Seliger created his own company, the Seliger Forschungs- und Entwicklungsgesellschaft mbH, which cooperated with the Deutsche Raketen-Gesellschaft (DRG). The Seliger Forschungs- und Entwicklungsgesellschaft mbH developed several two- and three-stage rockets, which could reach heights of up to 150 kilometers, between 1962 and 1963. After a disputed flight demonstration of the Seliger Forschungs- und Entwicklungsgesellschaft mbH militarily usable rockets before military representatives from non-NATO states at Cuxhaven on December 5, 1963, a break between the Seliger Forschungs- und Entwicklungsgesellschaft mbH and the Deutsche Raketen-Gesellschaft occurred. The latter continued to make a few high-altitude rocket launches up to June 1964 and continued experimenting with mail rockets and hybrid-propellant rocket and steam rocket propulsion systems until 1976.

In 1963, with the consent of Hermann Oberth, who had rendered outstanding service to Space, it was decided to rename the DRG to Hermann-Oberth-Gesellschaft (HOG). Oberth died in Feucht on December 28, 1989. In his book "The Rocket to the Planetary Spaces" published in 1923, he was the first to comprehensively present the scientific and technical foundations of rocket and space technology. He is considered the father of scientific rocket technology and astronautics.

After the termination of the rocket launches in the Cuxhaven Wadden area the Hermann-Oberth-Gesellschaft focused on nationwide public relations work on the international space programs through lecture evenings and space congresses, as well as the promotion of students in space technology in so-called Rocket and Space technology teaching and test centers.

In 1990, Dr.-Ing. August Friedrich Staats resigned as President after nearly forty years in office. His successor was Prof. Dr.-Ing. Hans Josef Rath. Staats was elected honorary and vice president. In the fall of 1990, the Hermann-Oberth-Gesellschaft entered into negotiations with the aim of merging the HOG with the Deutsche Gesellschaft für Luft- und Raumfahrt, the Gesellschaft für Raketentechnik und Weltraumfahrt and the Fachverband für Luftfahrt for the Deutsche Gesellschaft für Luft- und Raumfahrt Lilienthal–Oberth (DLRG) to merge. After extensive discussions and coordination, the merger was completed in 1993.
