= Cuxland =

Sightseeing location in Germany

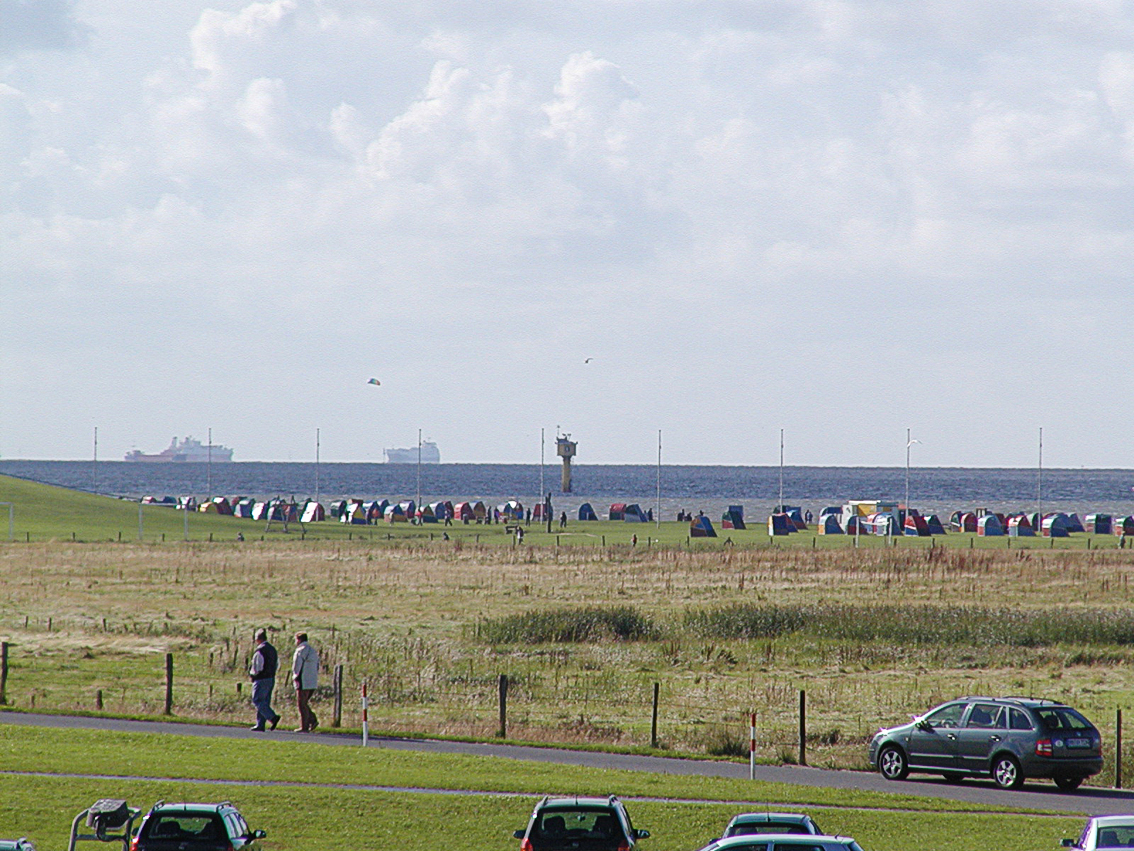
View from dyke of Elbe estuary and dyke foreland with grassy beach in Otterndorf

Cuxland, in a tourist sense, is the land between the River Weser and the mouth of the Elbe in the district of Cuxhaven on Germany's North Sea coast.

== Concept ==
The term Cuxland is an artificial word that has purely been coined for tourist purposes and has no historic significance. It particularly refers to the resorts of the Land Wursten like Dorum, Wremen and Midlum, but also the town of Cuxhaven and resorts of Sahlenburg, Duhnen within its borough Döse, as well as the town of Otterndorf.

== Tourism ==
The central attractions of Cuxland are Sahlenburg, Duhnen und Döse, which have a well developed tourist infrastructure with restaurants and hotels to cater for various tastes, holiday apartments, an open air pool, leisure facilities and shops. Additionally one can visit a number of museums in Cuxhaven, e.g. a museum about the German poet Joachim Ringelnatz in Ritzebüttel Castle.

The majority of the holidaymakers come from the German states of Lower Saxony, North Rhine-Westphalia, Bremen and Hamburg. With around 3 million overnight stays each year, Cuxhaven is the leading resort in Germany. The coastal villages in the collective municipality of Land Wursten and in the borough of Otterndorf are especially popular with families. Inland, spa facilities, cycling and riding are popular; the centre being Bad Bederkesa.

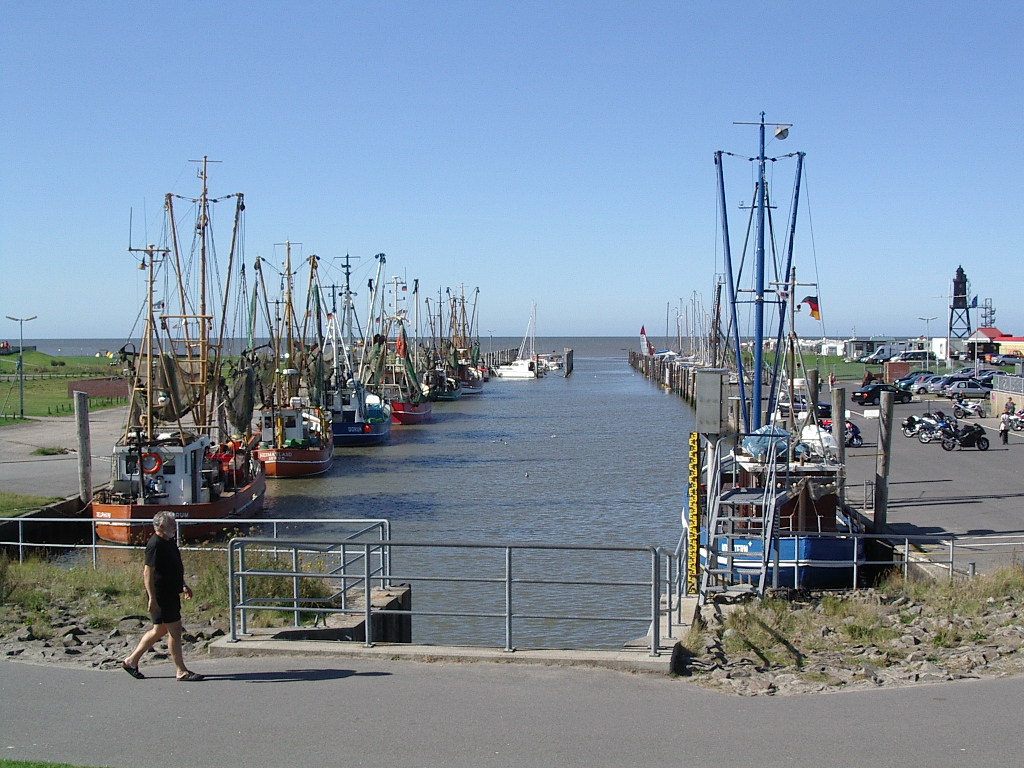
Cutter harbour at Dorumer Tief in Dorum-Neufeld

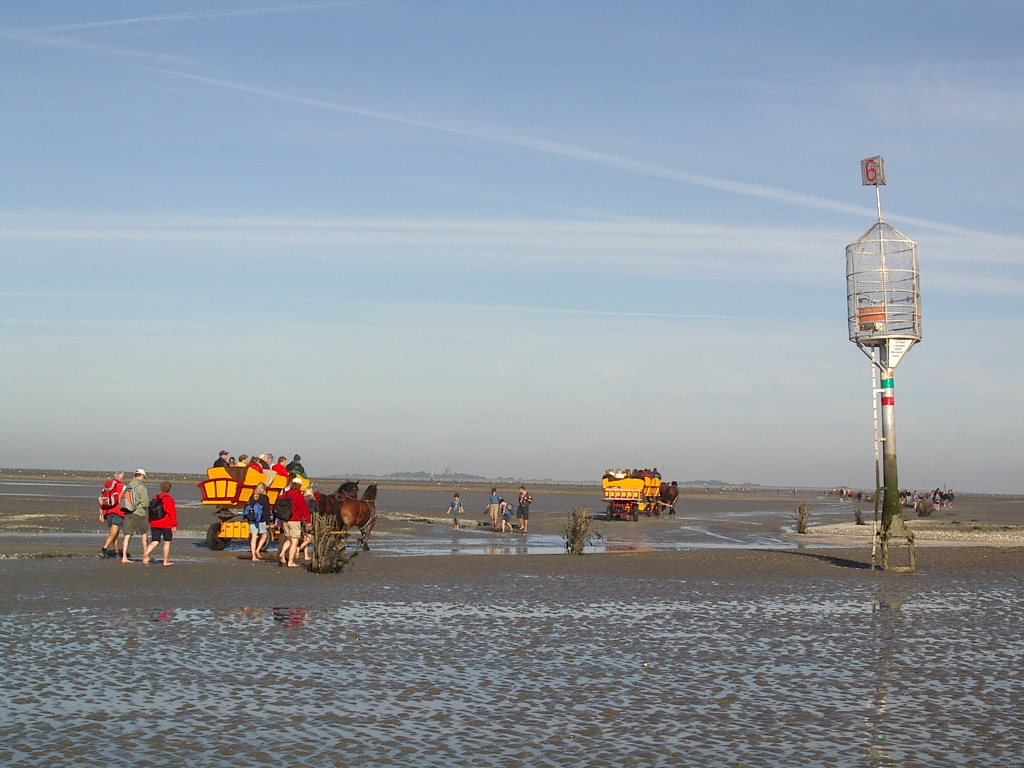
Mudflat car with day trippers in the Sahlenburger Watt near Cuxhaven, on the way to the island of Neuwerk

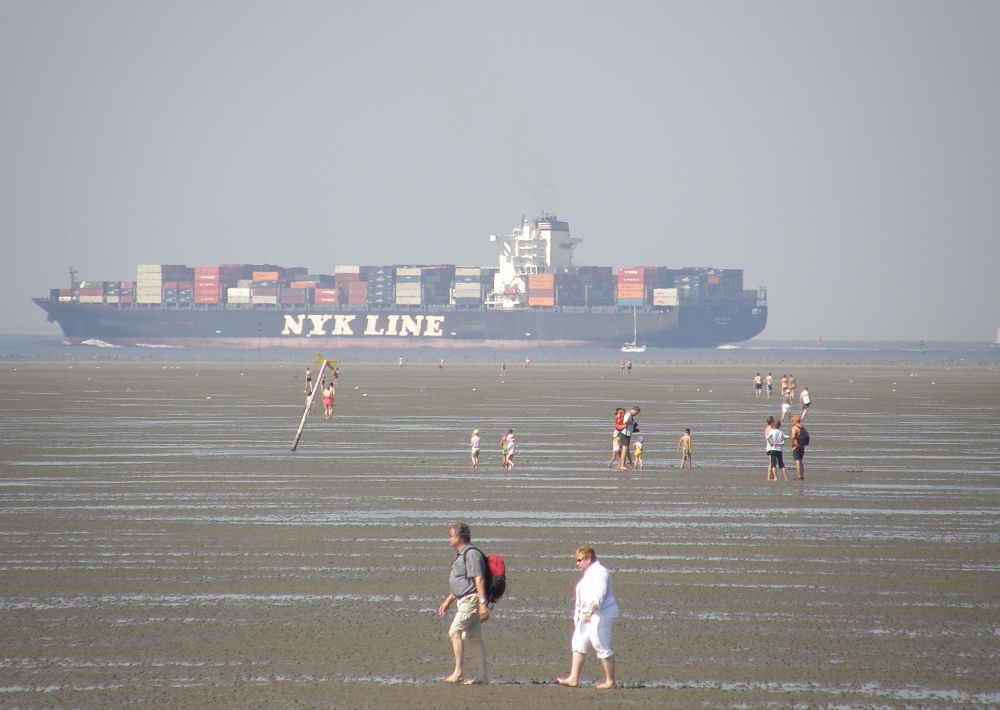
In the mudflats off Cuxhaven-Duhnen

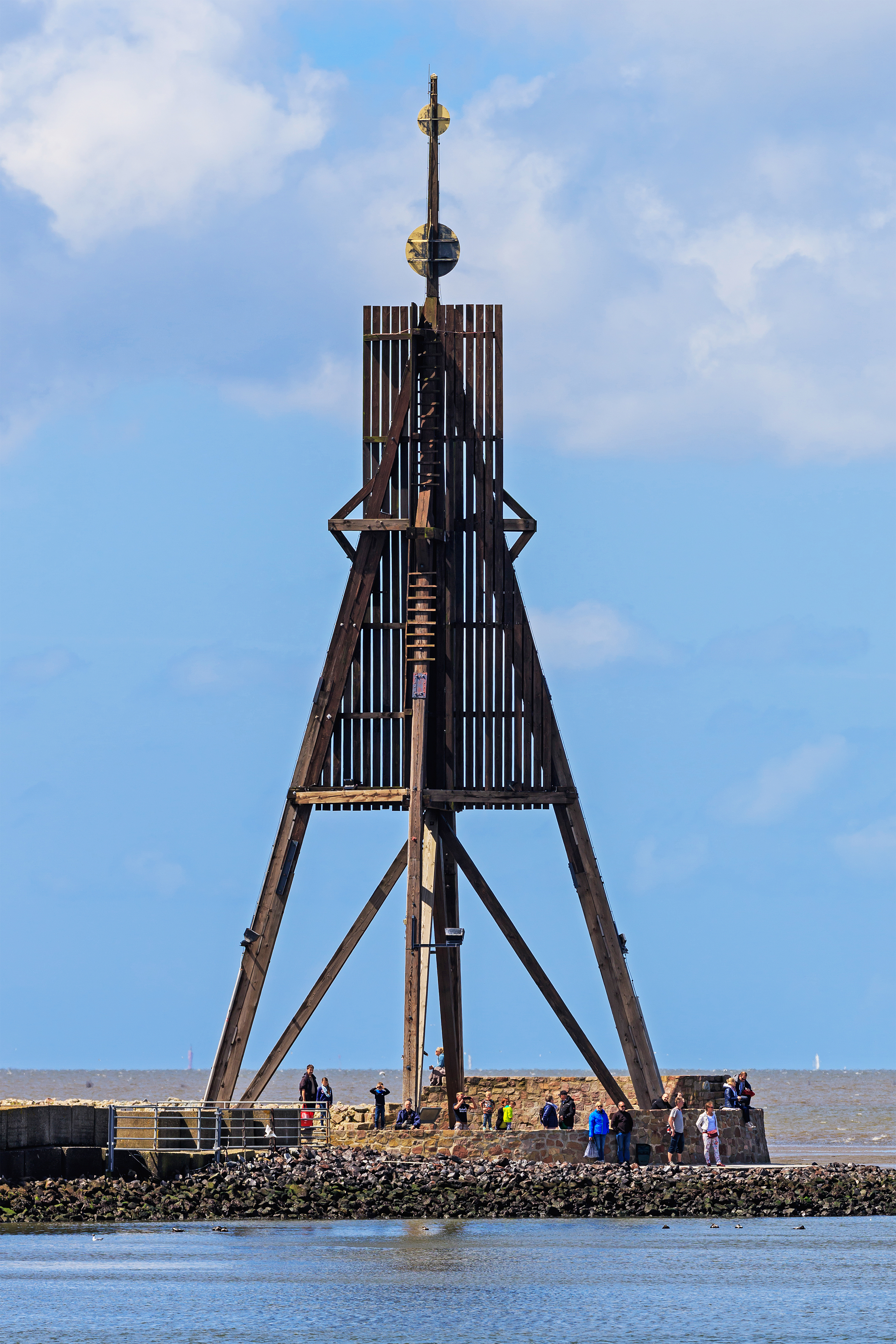
Cuxhaven's symbol and the northernmost point in Lower Saxony: the Kugelbake

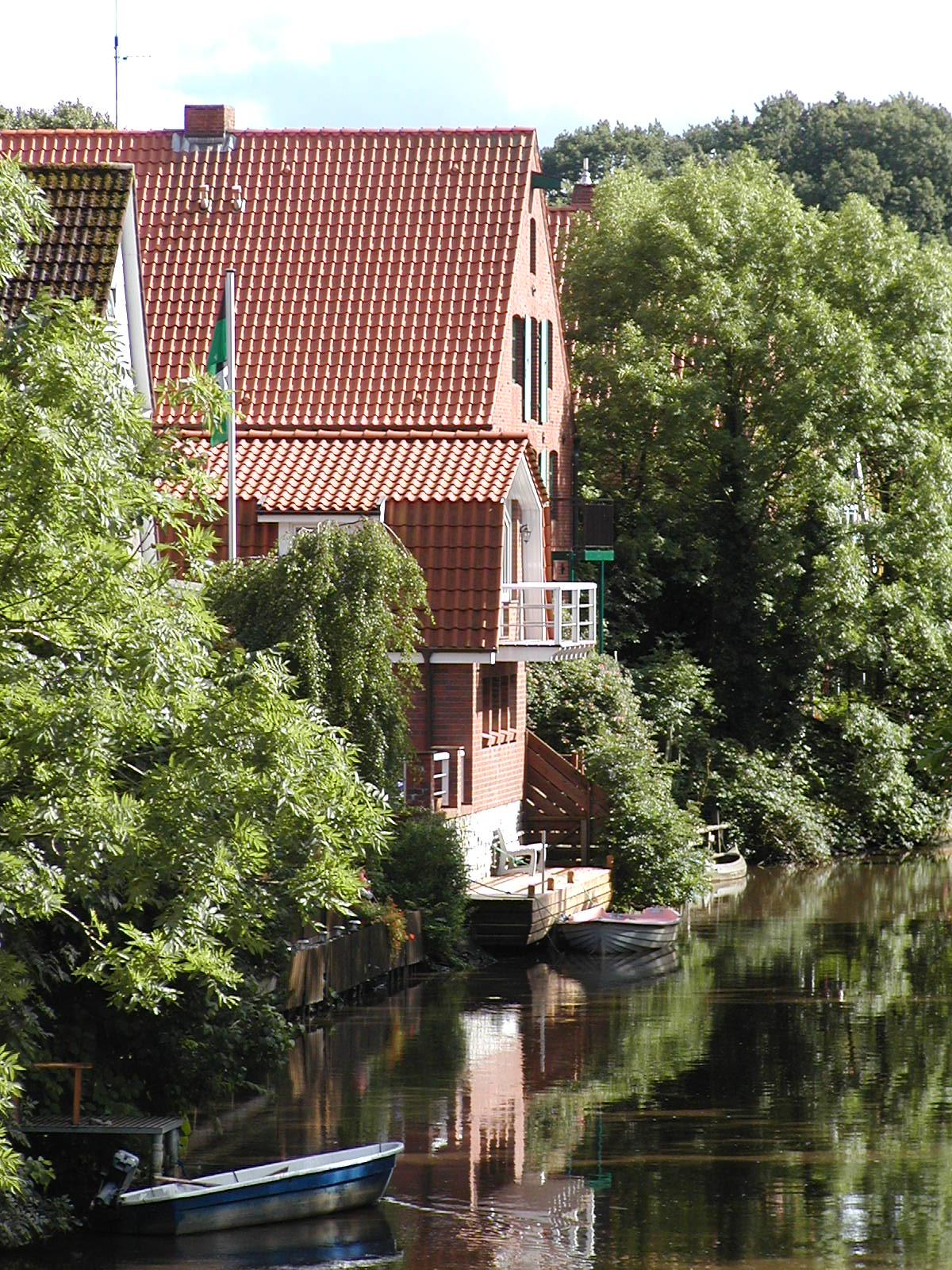
In Otterndorf on the Medem

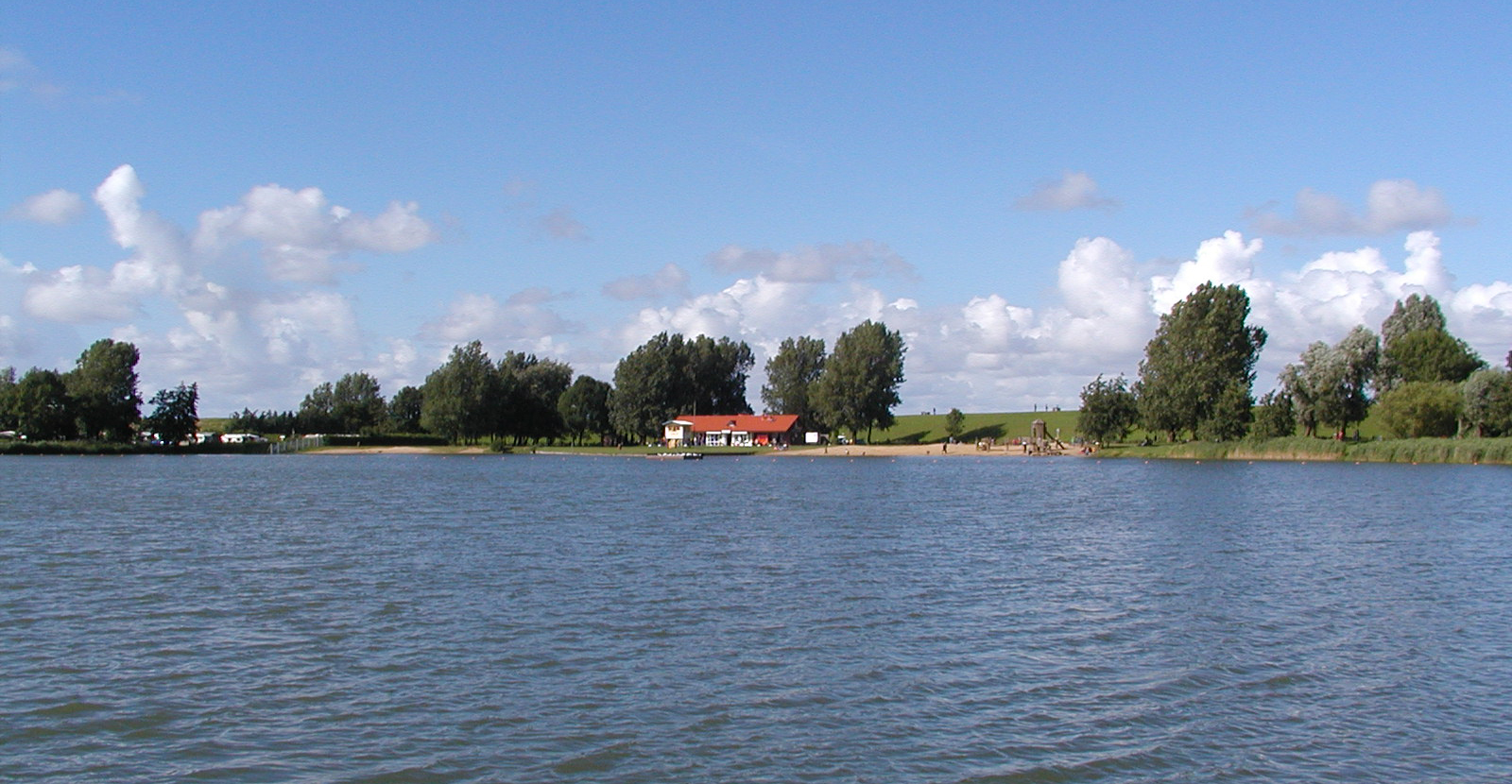
Otterndorf: lake of Achtern Diek

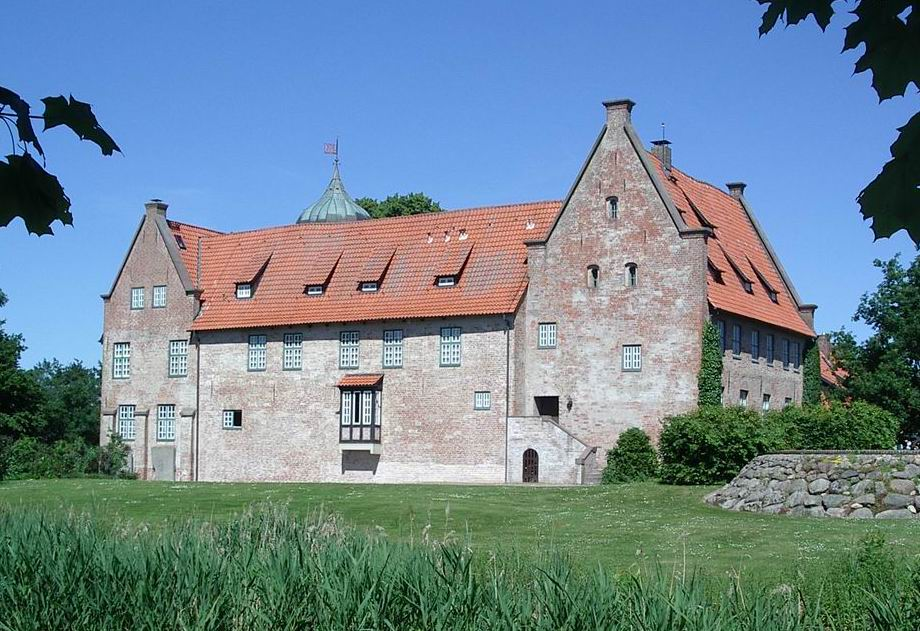
Castle in Bad Bederkesa

== Use of the term "Cuxland" ==
A local holiday park company secured the rights to the word "Cuxland" since 1997 as a brand.

In summer 2008 there were disputes about this. In connection with that the county council decided in favour of the general and wide use of the term "Cuxland".
