= Doos =

Doos may refer to the following places in Germany:

- Döös, the Low Saxon name for the town of Döse in the state of Lower Saxony
- Doos, a district in the town of Waischenfeld in the state of Bavaria
- Doos'sche Palais (Doos Palace) in Wilster in the state of Schleswig-Holstein
- Dictionary of Obscure Sorrows, abbreviated as DOOS

== See also ==
- Van Doos, English nickname for the Royal 22nd Regiment of the Canadian Army
