= Duhnen =

- Ortsteil of Cuxhaven
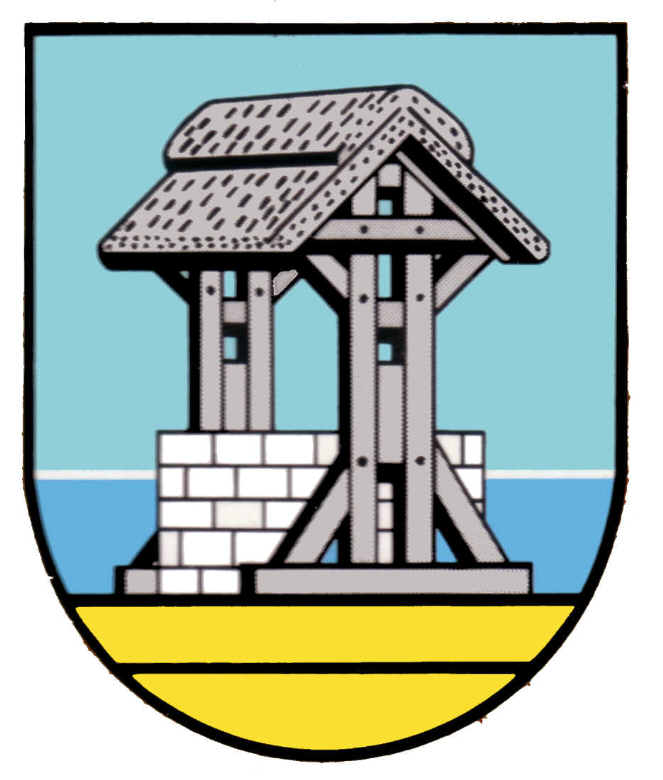
- Coat of arms
- Interactive map of Duhnen
- Location within Germany Location within Lower Saxony
- Coordinates: 53°52′58″N 08°38′44″E
- Country: Germany
- State: Lower Saxony
- Town: Cuxhaven
- Elevation: 8 m (26 ft)

Population (2006-12-31)
  - Total: 1,037
- Time zone: UTC+01:00 (CET)
  - Summer (DST): UTC+02:00 (CEST)
- Postal codes: 27476
- Dialling codes: 04721

Duhnen (toponym derived from dunes) is a seaside resort (Seebad ) along the North Sea, 5 kilometres (3.1 mi) from the centre of Cuxhaven city, Lower Saxony, Germany. Duhnen is located 351 kilometres (218 mi) northwest of Berlin. In 1935 Duhnen was incorporated into the city of Cuxhaven, more than 100 years after the city had been established. Visitors to Hamburg's nearby island of Neuwerk commonly travel through Duhnen. It was at one time a remote fishing and farming village, but today is one of the tourist centres of Cuxland.

== Tourism ==
Most of the homes in the area are used as cottages and camping sites.

The main beach, known as Duhnen Beach, is a long, softly sloping sandy beach situated on the North Sea. There's also a pre-laid mud area along the ocean bed that has been used for mud racing (horse racing since 1902).

== Horse racing ==
Horse and trotter racing along Duhnen Beach attracts about 30,000 spectators annually. The annual event begins when the mud flats, used as the racing track, are exposed by ebbing tides.

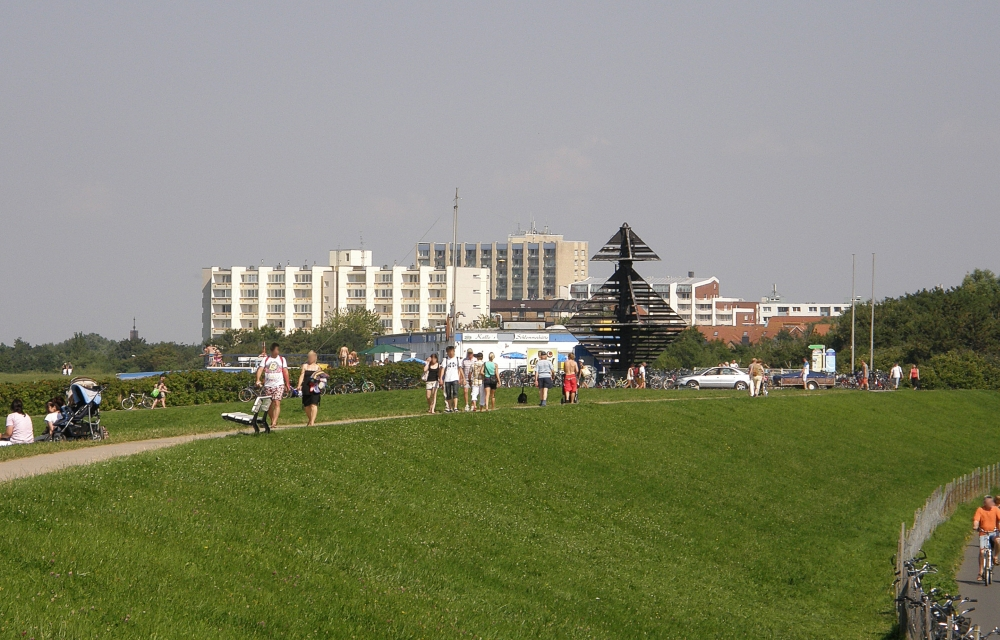
Central Duhnen

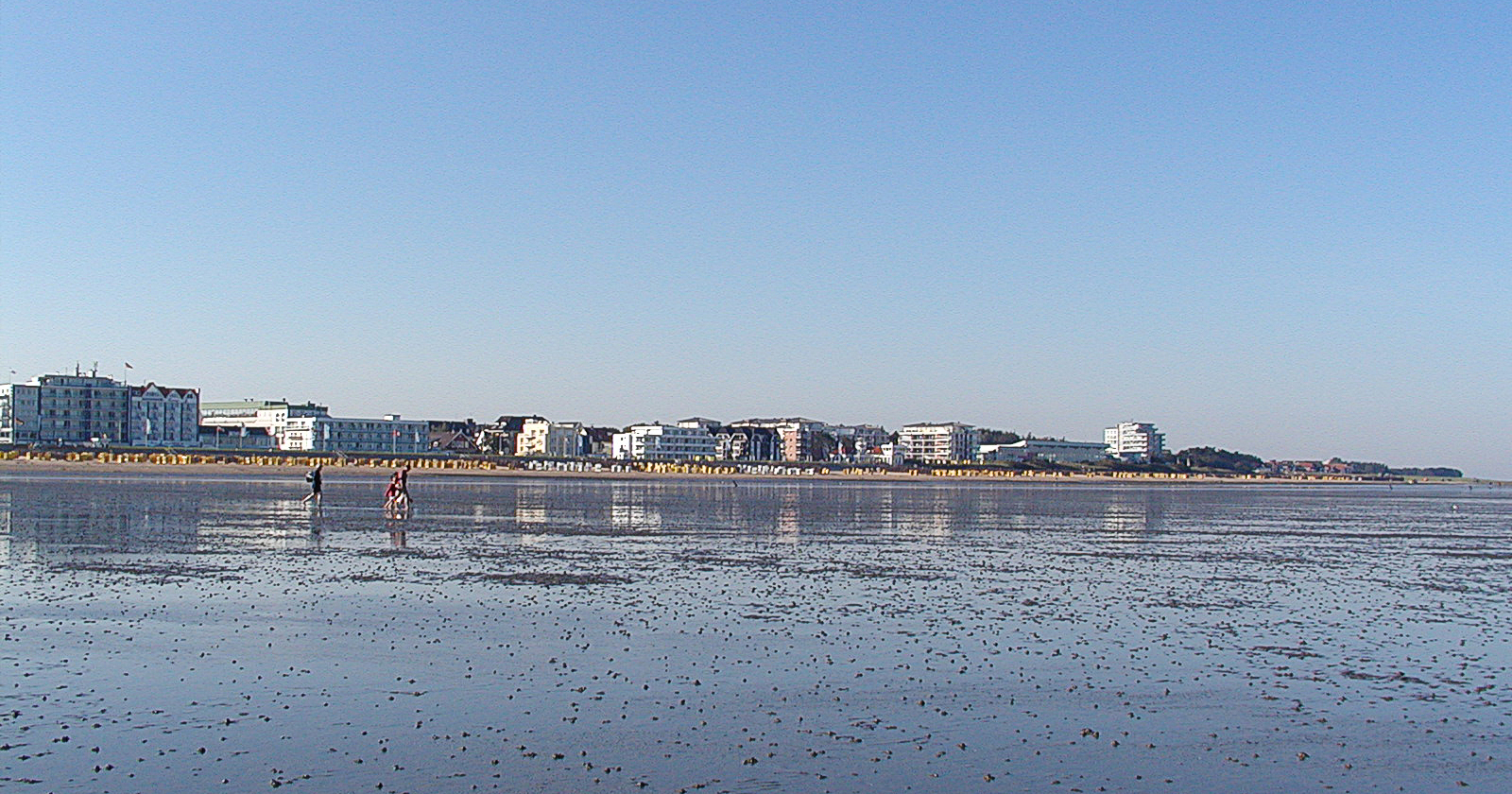
Mud flats along seabed
