= Cuxhaven =

Cuxhaven Cuxhoben (Low German)
- Town
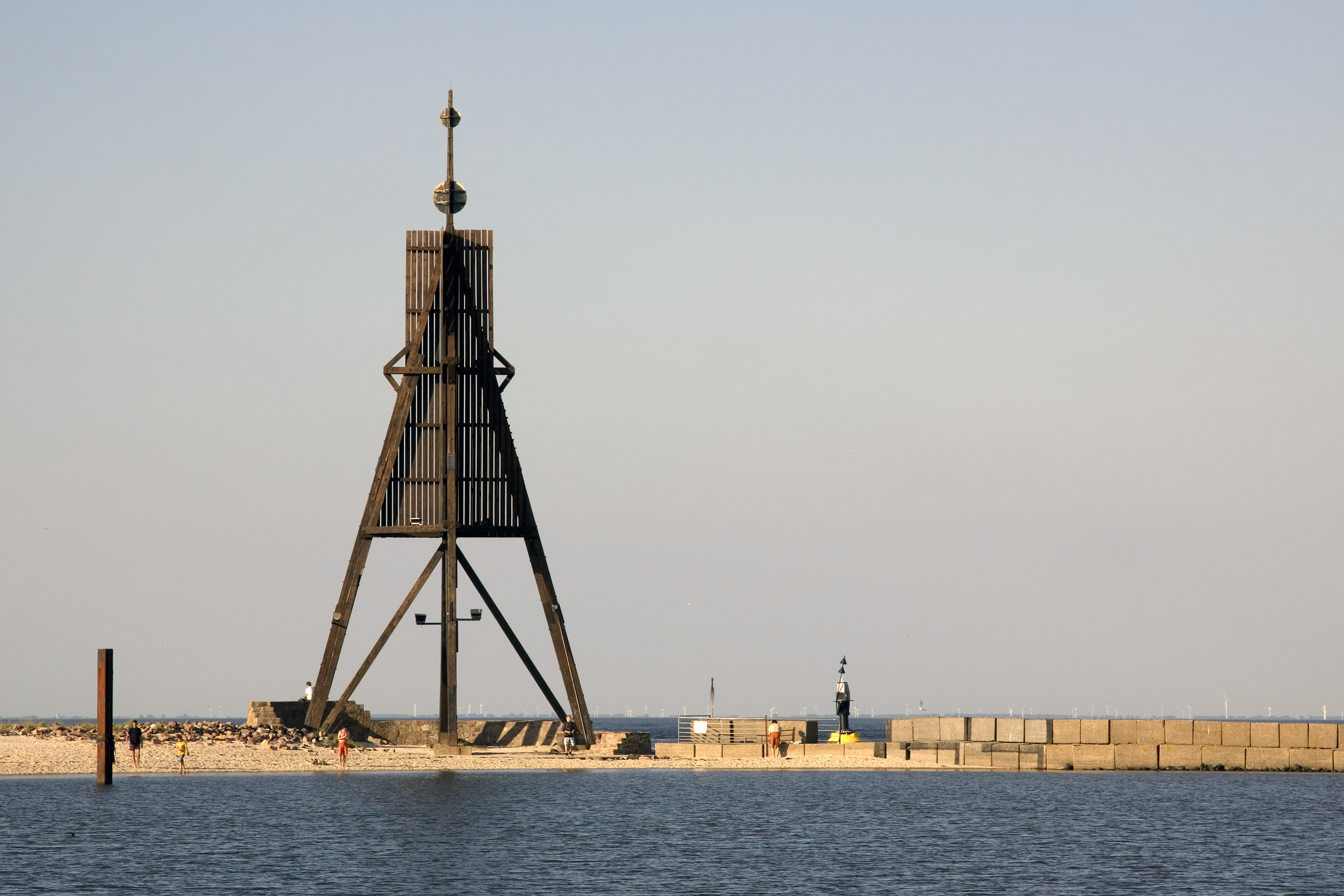
- Kugelbake, symbol of Cuxhaven

- Coat of arms

- Location of Cuxhaven within Cuxhaven district
- Interactive map of Cuxhaven
- Location within Germany Location within Lower Saxony
- Coordinates: 53°51′40″N 08°41′40″E
- Country: Germany
- State: Lower Saxony
- District: Cuxhaven

Government
  - Mayor (2019–24): Uwe Santjer (SPD)

Area
  - Total: 161.93 km^{2} (62.52 sq mi)
- Elevation: 2 m (6.6 ft)

Population (2025-12-31)
  - Total: 49,545
  - Density: 305.97/km^{2} (792.45/sq mi)
- Time zone: UTC+01:00 (CET)
  - Summer (DST): UTC+02:00 (CEST)
- Postal codes: 27472, 27474, 27476, 27478
- Dialling codes: 04721-04724
- Vehicle registration: CUX
- Website: www.cuxhaven.de

Cuxhaven (German: [kʊksˈhaːfn̩]; Low German: Cuxhoben) is a port town and seat of the Cuxhaven district, in Lower Saxony, Germany. The town includes the northernmost point of Lower Saxony. The city serves as a gateway to the nearby Heligoland islands, a tax free zone off the coast of Germany. Cuxhaven is situated on the shore of the North Sea at the mouth of the Elbe River. Cuxhaven has a footprint of 14 kilometres (9 miles) (east–west) by 7 km (4 mi) (north–south). Its town quarters Duhnen, Döse and Sahlenburg are especially popular vacation spots on the North Sea and home to about 52,000 residents.

Cuxhaven is home to an important fisherman's wharf and ship registration point for Hamburg as well as the Kiel Canal until 2008. Tourism is also of great importance. The city and its precursor Ritzebüttel belonged to Hamburg from the 13th century until 1937. What remains of Ritzebüttel is Ritzebüttel Castle ('Schloss Ritzebüttel'). The island of Neuwerk, a Hamburg dependency, is located just northwest of Cuxhaven in the North Sea. The city's symbol, known as the Kugelbake, is a beacon once used as a lighthouse; the wooden landmark on the mouth of the Elbe marks the boundary between the river and the North Sea and also adorns the city's coat of arms.

== History ==
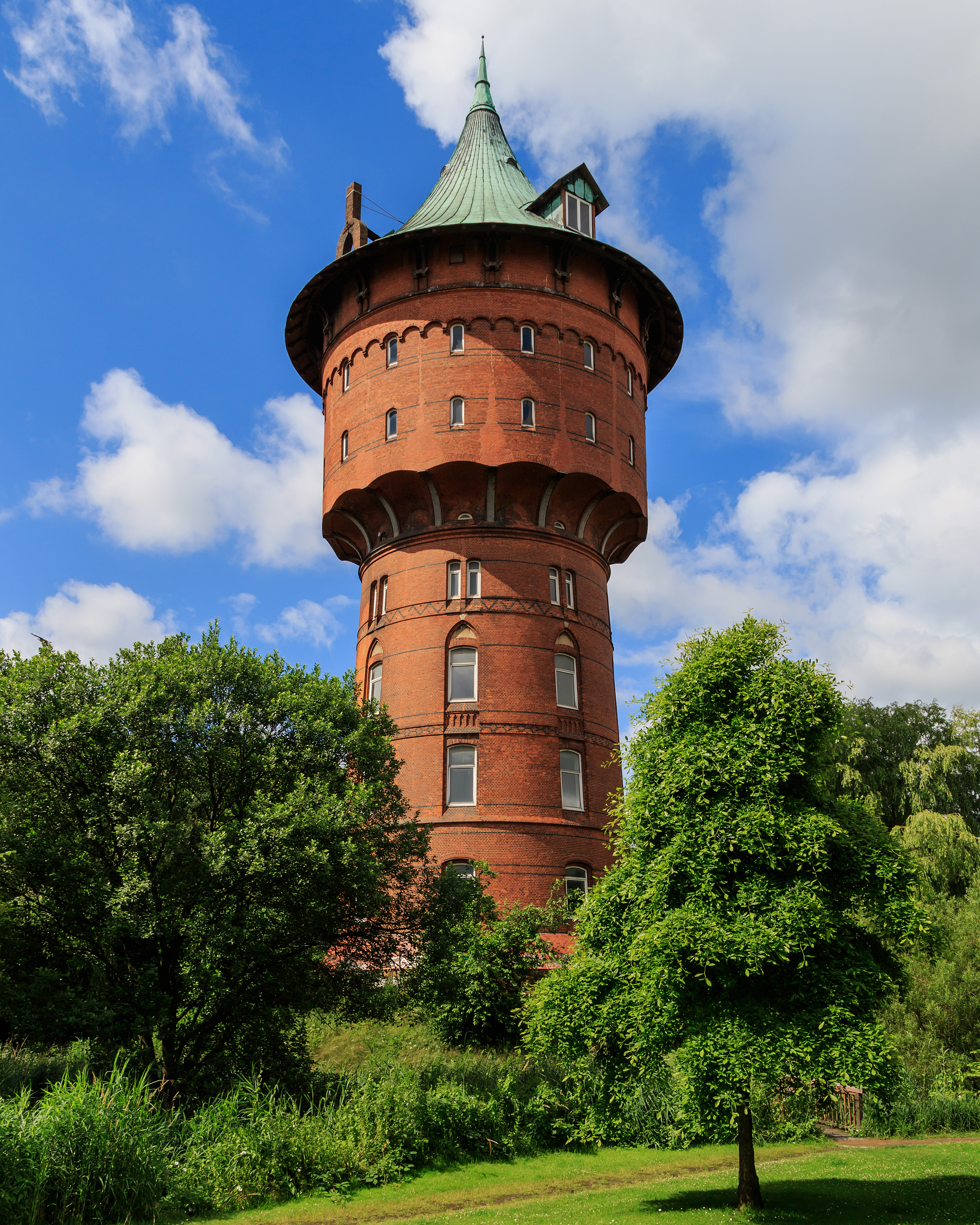
Water tower in Cuxhaven

Ritzebüttel, today a part of Cuxhaven, belonged to the Land of Hadeln, first an exclave of the younger Duchy of Saxony and after its de facto dynastic partition in 1296 of the Duchy of Saxe-Lauenburg, established de jure in 1260. In 1394 the city of Hamburg conquered the fortress of Ritzebüttel and made it its stronghold to protect the estuary of the river Elbe, which connects that city with the open sea.

The population in 1848 was about 800 inhabitants.

The Hamburg America Line built a large ocean liner terminal at Cuxhaven in 1900. Connected directly to Hamburg by a dedicated railway line and station, it served as the major departure point for German and European emigrants until 1969 when ocean liner travel ceased. The ornate assembly hall and associated buildings survived wartime damage and peacetime urban renewal to be restored in 1998 for use as a museum and cruise ship terminal.

On 15 March 1907 Cuxhaven gained city status within the state of Hamburg. In 1937 Cuxhaven became an urban district of the Stade Region within the Prussian Province of Hanover by the Greater Hamburg Act. In 1972 some municipalities of the neighboured rural district of Land of Hadeln were incorporated into the urban district of Cuxhaven. In 1977 Cuxhaven lost the status as urban district and was integrated into the new rural District of Cuxhaven, being its capital.

During the First World War Nordholz Airbase with its airship hangars, near Nordholz to the south of Cuxhaven, was one of the major Imperial German Navy airship stations. On Christmas Day 1914 it was attacked by Royal Navy seaplanes in the Cuxhaven Raid. It subsequently became a strategically important city as German authorities and civilians feared it would be the site of an Allied invasion.

During the Second World War, the town hosted a base of a Wehrmacht radio network, codenamed BROWN, which transmitted data regarding experimental weapon developments, including rocketry. From this location the last ENIGMA-code–encrypted message of the war was transmitted on 7 May 1945. It reported the arrival of British troops and ends: "Closing down for ever – all the best – goodbye."

Between 1945 and 1964 the Hermann-Oberth-Gesellschaft performed various civilian experiments in rocketry near Cuxhaven.

== Tourism ==
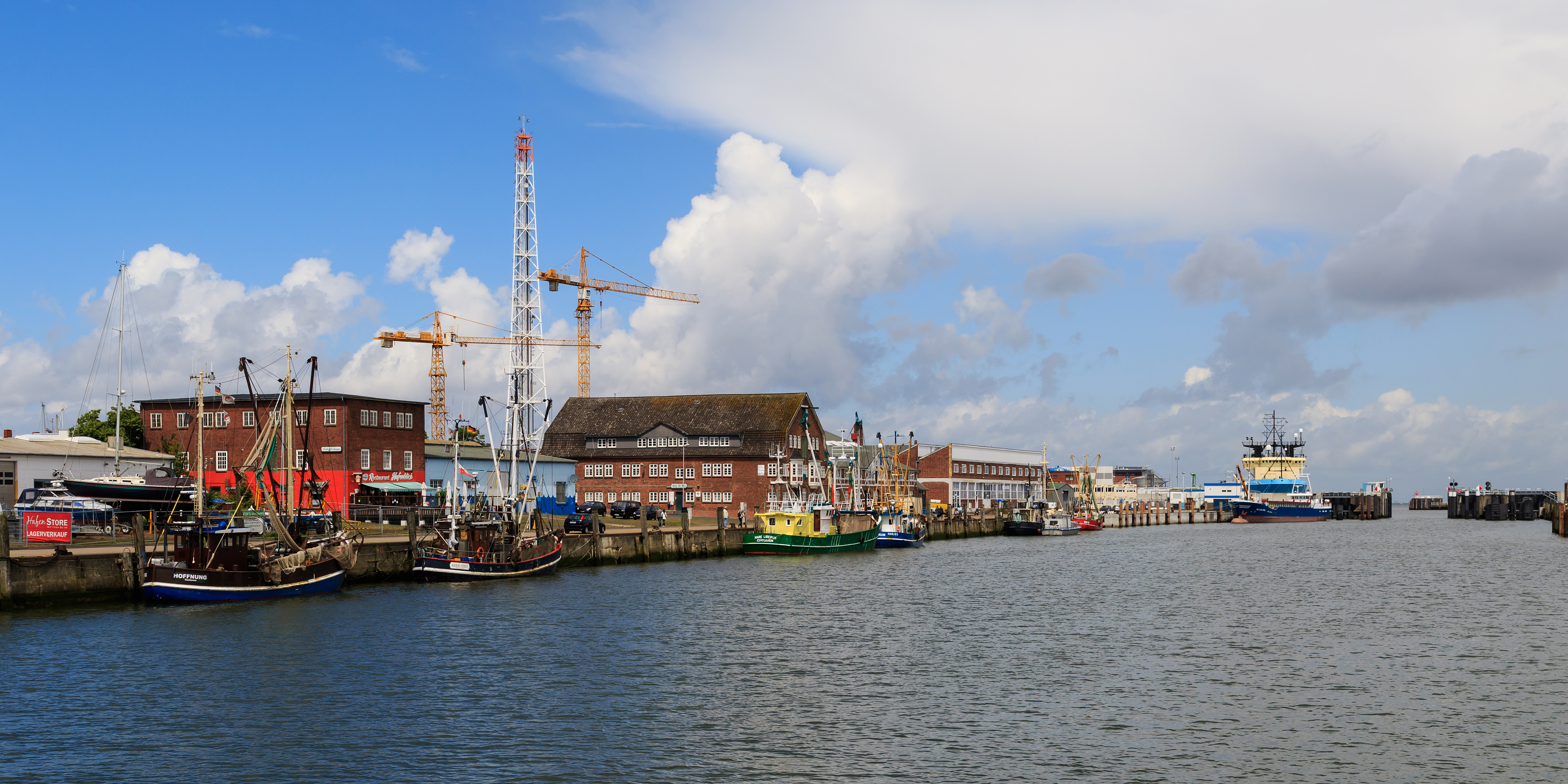
The fishing harbour by the Fischmarkt

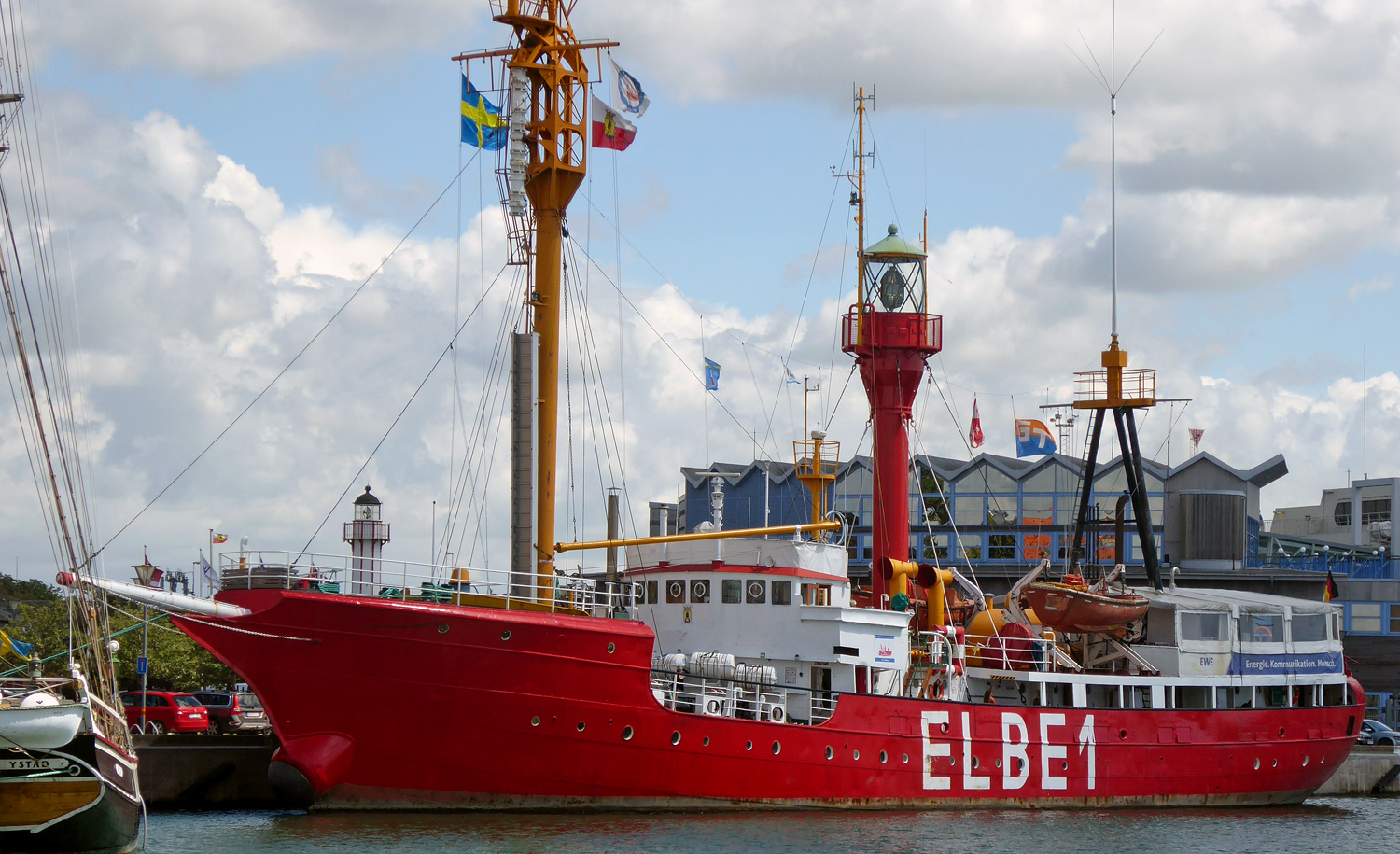
Bürgermeister O'Swald II was the world's largest crewed lightship, the last lightship at position Elbe 1. It is now a B&B in Cuxhaven. 2017.

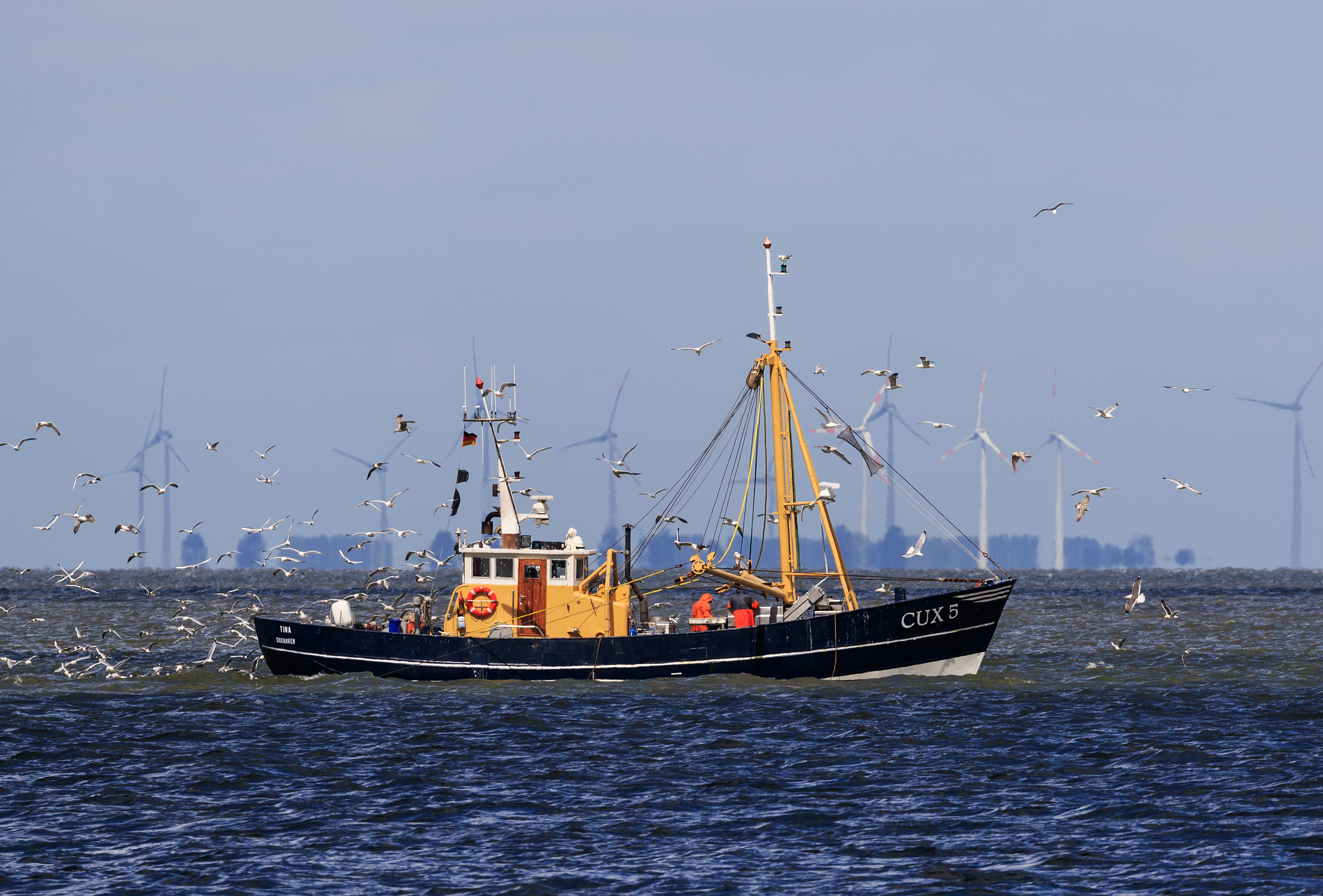
A shrimp cutter returns.

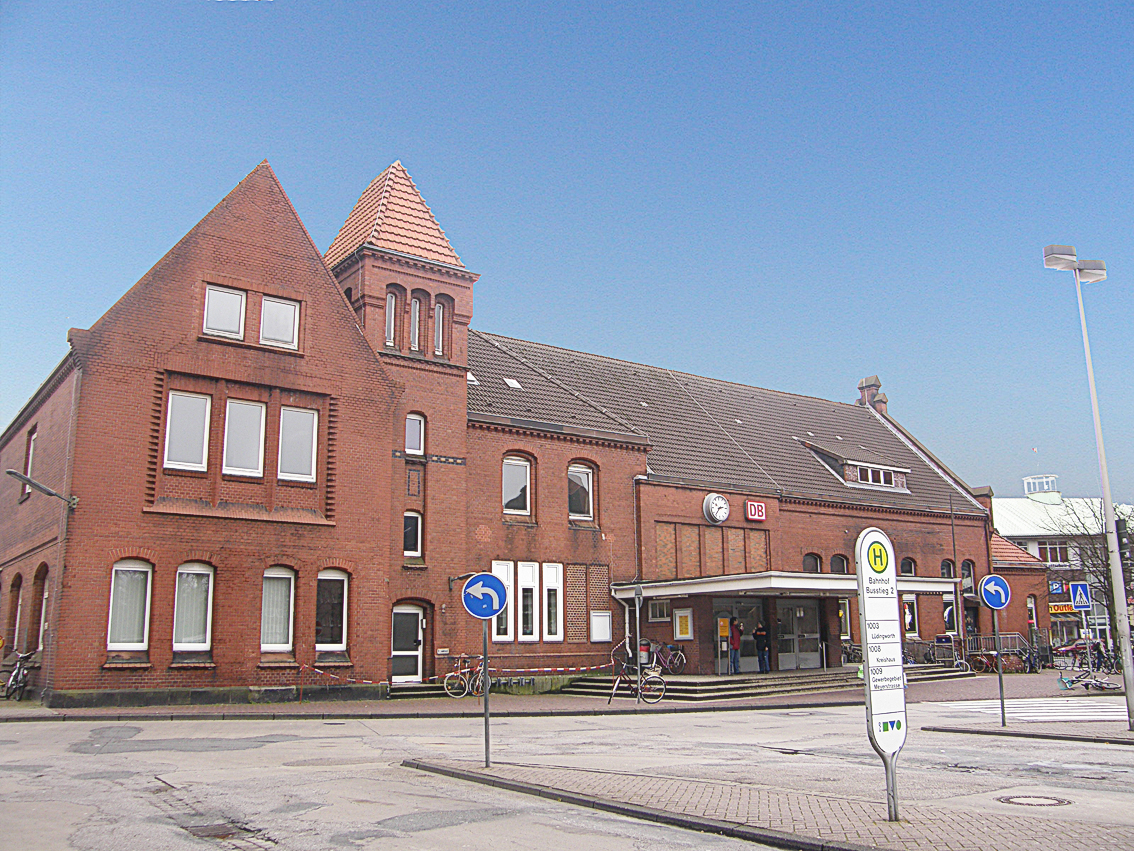
Cuxhaven station building (2013), extensively renovated by 2018

The origins of tourism go back to the year 1816 when a seaside resort was founded in Cuxhaven. Since 1964 Cuxhaven has been a state-recognized climate seaside resort (Seeheilbad) and centre of the so-called holiday region of Cuxland.

In the village of Lüdingworth, in the southern part of the town, stands the Jacobikirche, Saint Jack's Church. Due to its organ by Arp Schnitger and its lavish baroque interior, the building is one of the most notable of its kind in all Lower Saxony.

== Geographical and cultural background ==
The town is served by Cuxhaven station.

The island of Neuwerk is situated 8 kilometres (5 mi) off the coast from Cuxhaven. At low tide the water recedes so far from the coast that the island can be reached either by mudflat hiking or by horse carriage.

A modern landmark of Cuxhaven is the Friedrich-Clemens-Gerke Tower, a telecommunication tower built of concrete, which is not accessible to the public. It is not really distinctive, for many cities in Germany have a similar tower.

The high-test peroxide (HTP) submarine U1407 was raised from where she had been scuttled in Cuxhaven after WWII and rebuilt by the British, being commissioned as HMS Meteorite. It was the catalyst for a series of German-made air-independent propulsion submarines such as the Type 212 and Type 214.

== Harbours ==
The Cuxport deep-water port has begun operations in 1997. It is crucial for the continued economic development of the city of Cuxhaven and its surrounding area. Until 1993, the site of the new port belonged to the Free and Hanseatic City of Hamburg. After long negotiations with Hamburg this land became the property of the state of Lower Saxony, which then invested approximately €140 million in the construction of the new port facilities. There are six berths at two terminals (Europakai and Lübbertkai). The port is located at the Elbe estuary, near the Kiel Canal to the Baltic Sea.

The Cuxhaven multi-purpose terminal is (as of July 2025) operated by Cuxport GmbH, a subsidiary of Rhenus AG & Co. KG (74.9%) and the Hamburg-based HHLA (Hamburger Hafen und Logistik AG, 25.1%).

The main businesses are RoRo transport, new vehicle storage and shipping (295,644 units in 2021), container handling, and the storage and handling of plant components for offshore wind farms. Components such as tower sections, rotor blades, and nacelles for onshore wind turbines are also handled.

In 2021, about 2.448 million tonnes of goods were handled in maritime transport. The offshore infrastructure sector is significantly expanded in 2025-2029.

== Twin towns – sister cities ==
Cuxhaven is twinned with:

- Binz, Germany (1990)
- Hafnarfjörður, Iceland (1988)
- Penzance, England, United Kingdom (1967–1974, 2009–present)
- Sassnitz, Germany (1990)
- Vannes, France (1963)

== Notable people ==
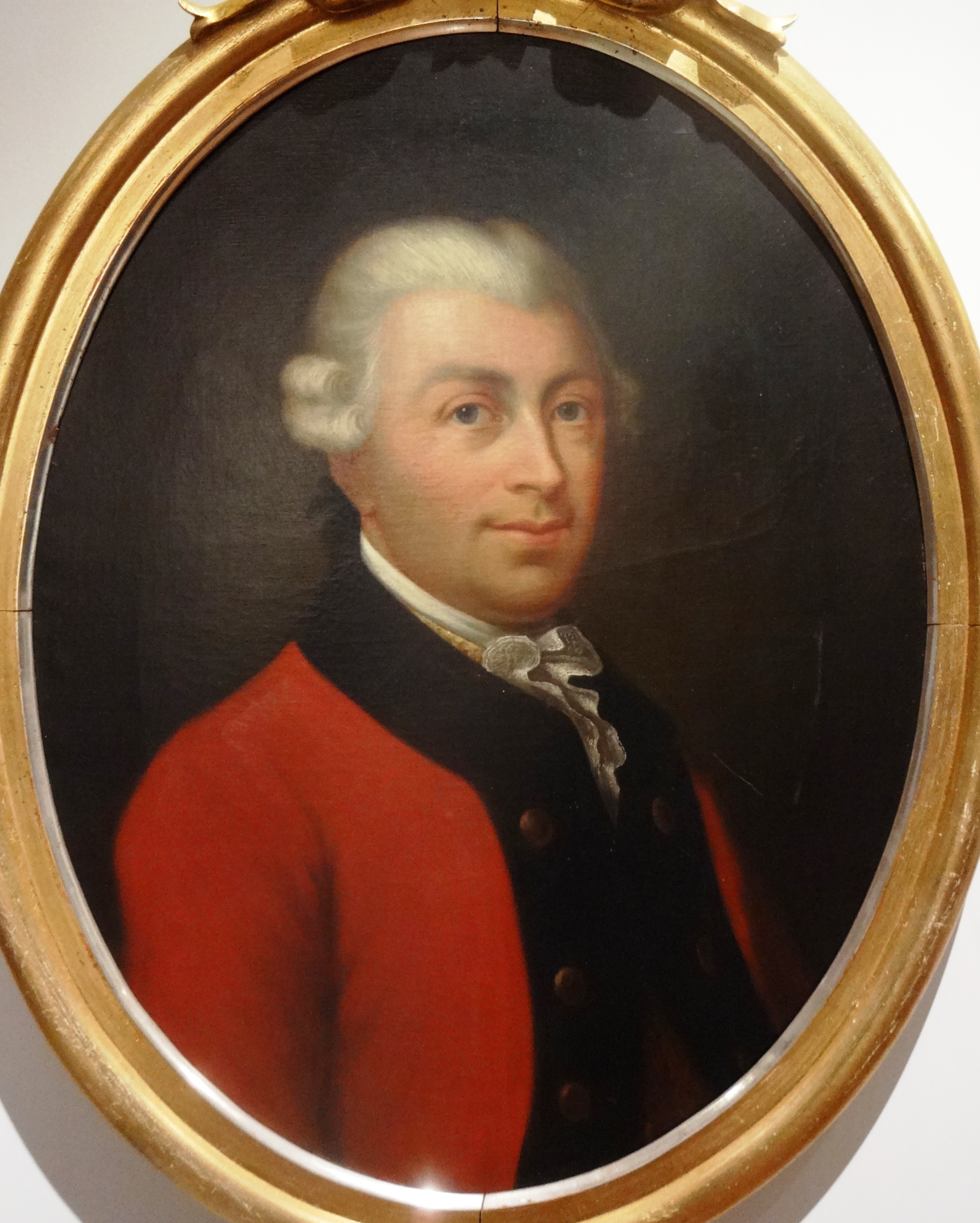
Carsten Niebuhr

- Carsten Niebuhr (1733–1815), mathematician, cartographer and explorer.
- Joachim Ringelnatz (1883–1934), poet, cabaret artiste and painter. Since 2002 the city hosts the Joachim Ringelnatz-Museum, managed by the Joachim Ringelnatz-Foundation.
- Francis Dutton CMG (1818–1877), 7th Premier of South Australia
- Anna Strohsahl (1885–1953), first woman city councillor in Cuxhaven
- Curt Rothenberger (1896–1959), lawyer and Nazi politician
- August Dieckmann (1912–1943), Knight's Cross of the Iron Cross recipient
- Rainer Feist (1945–2007), Admiral, Deputy Supreme Commander of the NATO – HQ
- Stefanie Schneider (born 1968), photographer/artist
- Volker Neumüller (born 1969), music manager and former DSDS jury member
- Constantin Schreiber (born 1979), journalist and author

=== Sport ===
- Jochen Fraatz (born 1963), handball player, member of the national team, team silver medallist at the 1984 Summer Olympics
- Gunnar Sauer (born 1964), footballer, played 303 matches
- Lena Petermann (born 1994), footballer, played over 170 matches, including 22 for Germany women's national football team

== Climate ==
Cuxhaven has an oceanic climate (Köppen: Cfb; Trewartha: Dobk), located on the North Sea coast, the weather is noticeably warmer in winter and cooler in summer.

The Cuxhaven weather station has recorded the following extreme values:

- Its highest temperature was 36.3 °C (97.3 °F) on 9 August 1992.
- Its lowest temperature was −18.2 °C (−0.8 °F) on 24 February 1947.
- Its greatest annual precipitation was 1,144.5 mm (45.06 in) in 1998.
- Its least annual precipitation was 482.2 mm (18.98 in) in 1959.
- The longest annual sunshine was 2179.3 hours in 1947.
- The shortest annual sunshine was 1421.7 hours in 1988.

Climate data for Cuxhaven (1991–2020 normals, extremes 1946–present)
| Month | Jan | Feb | Mar | Apr | May | Jun | Jul | Aug | Sep | Oct | Nov | Dec | Year |
|---|---|---|---|---|---|---|---|---|---|---|---|---|---|
| Record high °C (°F) | 14.4 (57.9) | 17.5 (63.5) | 22.4 (72.3) | 28.0 (82.4) | 31.3 (88.3) | 34.2 (93.6) | 35.9 (96.6) | 36.3 (97.3) | 31.4 (88.5) | 25.6 (78.1) | 19.4 (66.9) | 14.5 (58.1) | 36.3 (97.3) |
| Mean maximum °C (°F) | 10.5 (50.9) | 10.6 (51.1) | 15.5 (59.9) | 20.4 (68.7) | 24.2 (75.6) | 27.9 (82.2) | 29.0 (84.2) | 29.6 (85.3) | 24.4 (75.9) | 19.2 (66.6) | 14.1 (57.4) | 11.1 (52.0) | 31.6 (88.9) |
| Mean daily maximum °C (°F) | 4.5 (40.1) | 4.9 (40.8) | 7.8 (46.0) | 12.3 (54.1) | 16.1 (61.0) | 19.0 (66.2) | 21.4 (70.5) | 21.6 (70.9) | 18.2 (64.8) | 13.5 (56.3) | 8.5 (47.3) | 5.5 (41.9) | 12.8 (55.0) |
| Daily mean °C (°F) | 2.7 (36.9) | 2.9 (37.2) | 5.0 (41.0) | 8.8 (47.8) | 12.6 (54.7) | 15.7 (60.3) | 18.0 (64.4) | 18.2 (64.8) | 15.1 (59.2) | 10.9 (51.6) | 6.5 (43.7) | 3.6 (38.5) | 10.0 (50.0) |
| Mean daily minimum °C (°F) | 0.7 (33.3) | 0.8 (33.4) | 2.5 (36.5) | 5.8 (42.4) | 9.6 (49.3) | 12.7 (54.9) | 15.1 (59.2) | 15.2 (59.4) | 12.4 (54.3) | 8.4 (47.1) | 4.5 (40.1) | 1.7 (35.1) | 7.4 (45.3) |
| Mean minimum °C (°F) | −6.4 (20.5) | −5.0 (23.0) | −2.1 (28.2) | 1.4 (34.5) | 5.3 (41.5) | 9.2 (48.6) | 11.7 (53.1) | 11.1 (52.0) | 8.6 (47.5) | 2.9 (37.2) | −0.9 (30.4) | −4.2 (24.4) | −8.4 (16.9) |
| Record low °C (°F) | −15.7 (3.7) | −18.2 (−0.8) | −13.3 (8.1) | −2.6 (27.3) | 0.5 (32.9) | 4.2 (39.6) | 7.2 (45.0) | 7.6 (45.7) | 3.3 (37.9) | −2.4 (27.7) | −7.9 (17.8) | −15.1 (4.8) | −18.2 (−0.8) |
| Average precipitation mm (inches) | 69.1 (2.72) | 53.1 (2.09) | 48.4 (1.91) | 36.8 (1.45) | 52.1 (2.05) | 77.1 (3.04) | 84.8 (3.34) | 90.6 (3.57) | 80.8 (3.18) | 84.2 (3.31) | 71.5 (2.81) | 77.8 (3.06) | 824.4 (32.46) |
| Average extreme snow depth cm (inches) | 2.8 (1.1) | 3.3 (1.3) | 2.6 (1.0) | 0.1 (0.0) | 0 (0) | 0 (0) | 0 (0) | 0 (0) | 0 (0) | 0 (0) | 0.3 (0.1) | 2.5 (1.0) | 6.7 (2.6) |
| Average precipitation days (≥ 0.1 mm) | 18.6 | 15.6 | 15.5 | 13.1 | 13.7 | 15.0 | 16.1 | 16.8 | 15.9 | 17.7 | 18.9 | 19.0 | 193.6 |
| Average snowy days (≥ 1.0 cm) | 3.6 | 4.3 | 1.9 | 0.1 | 0 | 0 | 0 | 0 | 0 | 0 | 0.4 | 3.0 | 15.0 |
| Average relative humidity (%) | 86.9 | 84.4 | 81.2 | 76.7 | 75.2 | 75.4 | 75.9 | 75.8 | 78.5 | 82.3 | 86.5 | 87.9 | 80.5 |
| Mean monthly sunshine hours | 47.3 | 71.7 | 131.4 | 192.5 | 233.1 | 218.1 | 229.8 | 211.3 | 157.3 | 108.8 | 53.6 | 37.3 | 1,698.5 |
Source 1: NOAA
Source 2: Deutscher Wetterdienst / SKlima.de

== See also ==
- Rocket experiments in the area of Cuxhaven
  - Operation Backfire

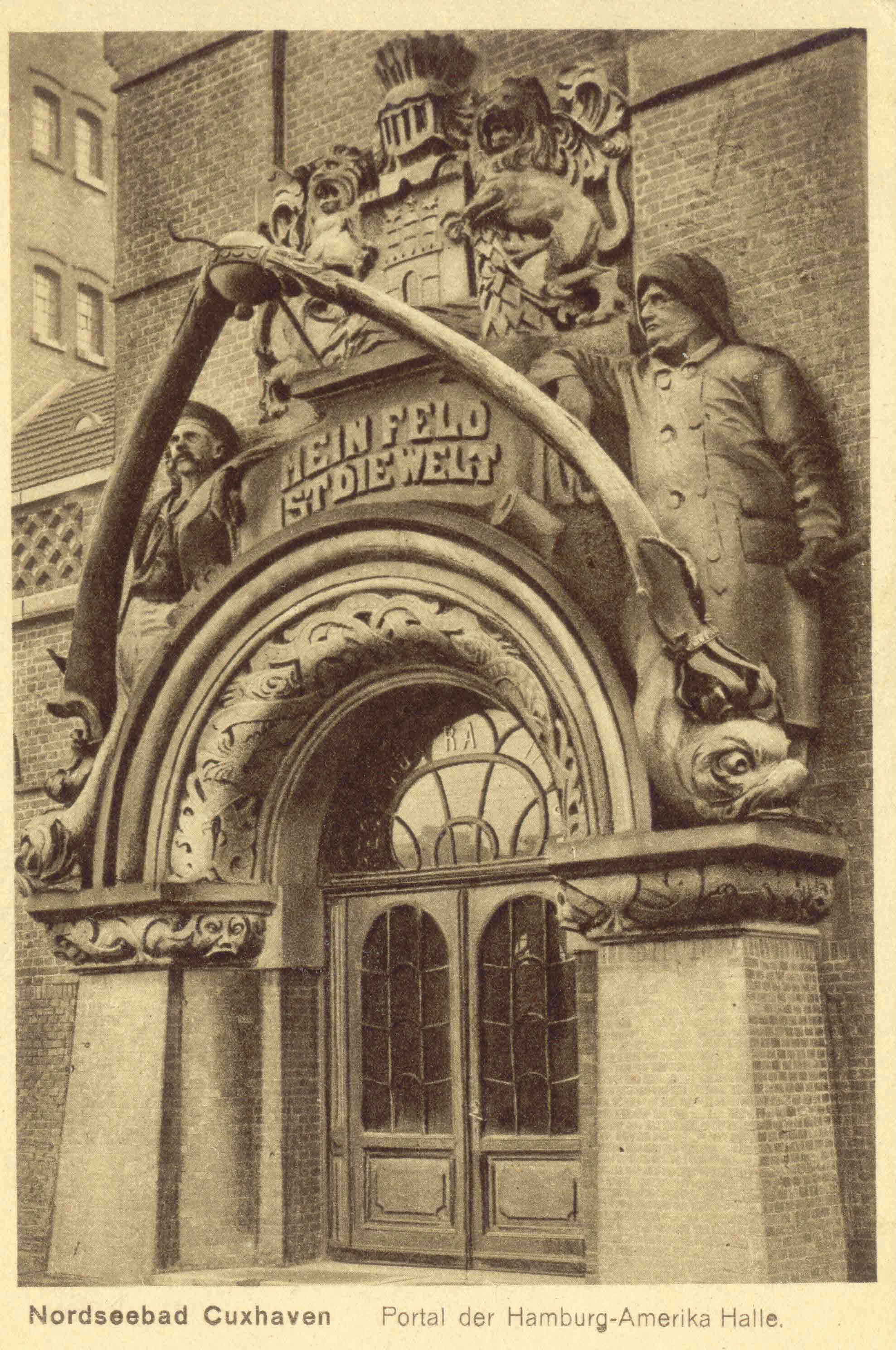
Motto, My field is the world, above the entrance to the Hapag Hall Passenger Terminal, until 1953
