= Svaneke water tower =

Water tower in Svaneke, Denmark

Coordinates: 55°08′26″N 15°08′01″E

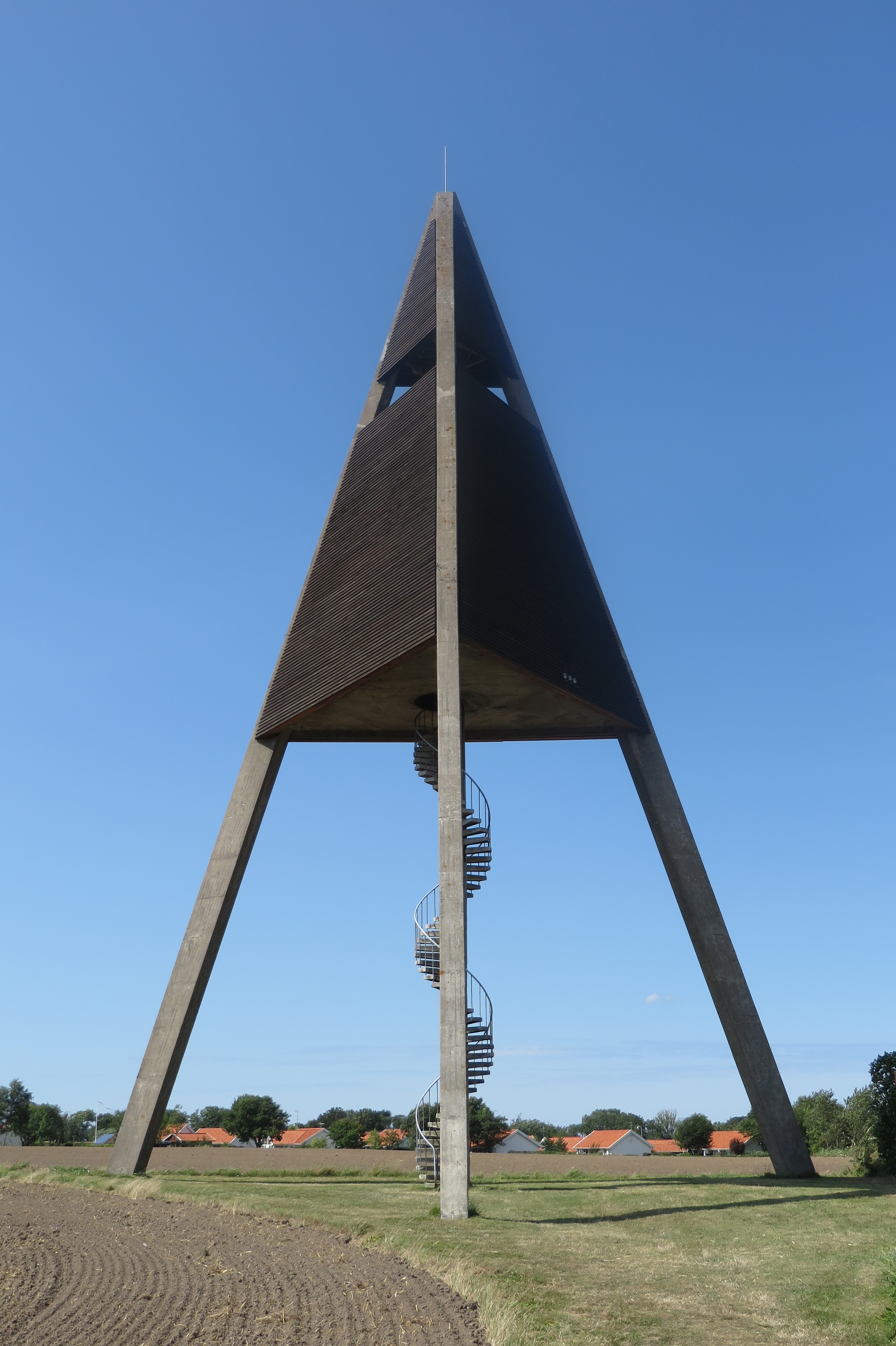
Svaneke Water Tower

The Svaneke water tower, in the small town of Svaneke on the Danish island of Bornholm, was designed by award-winning architect Jørn Utzon and completed in 1952. It was the first successful project of the architect who would later design the Sydney Opera House.

== History ==
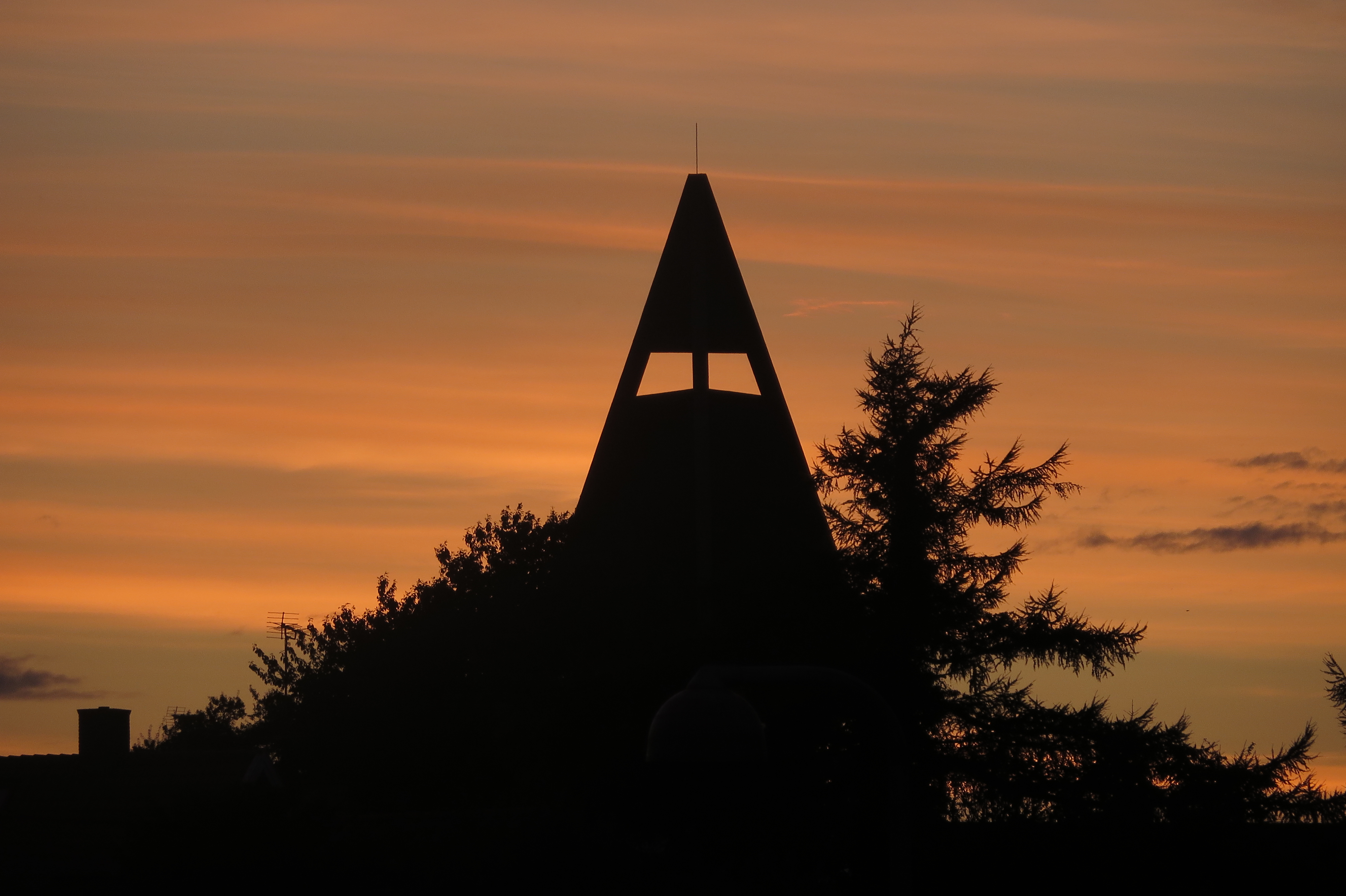

In 1951, the Svaneke town council was considering having a water tower built. The mayor, Emil Andersen, had just been discussing the matter with Preben Vistesen from Aalborg who had previous experience in the area. On his way back to Aalborg, Vistesen happened to meet Jørn Utzon in Copenhagen where they were both waiting for their return flight and had some time on their hands. Over a cup of coffee, Vistesen told him about Svaneke's intention to build a water tower and asked whether he would be interested in helping with the design. Utzon immediately sketched out his innovative idea on a paper serviette. Vistesen put the serviette in his pocket and presented it soon afterwards to the mayor, who was enchanted with the design.

Despite strong opposition, Andersen managed to convince the town council that Utzon's design was worthwhile. In his own words, "It is the only water tower in Denmark that was agreed by a town council when all the votes were against the proposal." Utzon's design was finally accepted in April 1951 and the tower was completed in November 1952.

== Architecture ==
The surprisingly shaped water tower was inspired by the old sea marks used for assisting the navigation of ships at sea. The marks were used in the west of Jutland and in the Swedish archipelago from the end of the 16th century in cases when there were no other distinguishable markings along the coast.

The pyramidal water tank is supported by three slender ferro-concrete legs which meet at the top of the tower. The centrally placed steps, also made of concrete, wind up elegantly from the ground. The water tower was taken out of service in 1988 when alterations to the water supply system were introduced. Since 1990, it has been a listed building.

The water tower in Svaneke was the first of five works by Utzon which can be characterized as concrete architecture. The water tower's tank supported by three sloping concrete legs make the structure thin but powerful. The other works which demonstrate Utzon's creativity with concrete are: the Sydney Opera House, Bagsværd Church, the Kuwait National Assembly and the Paustian Furniture House.

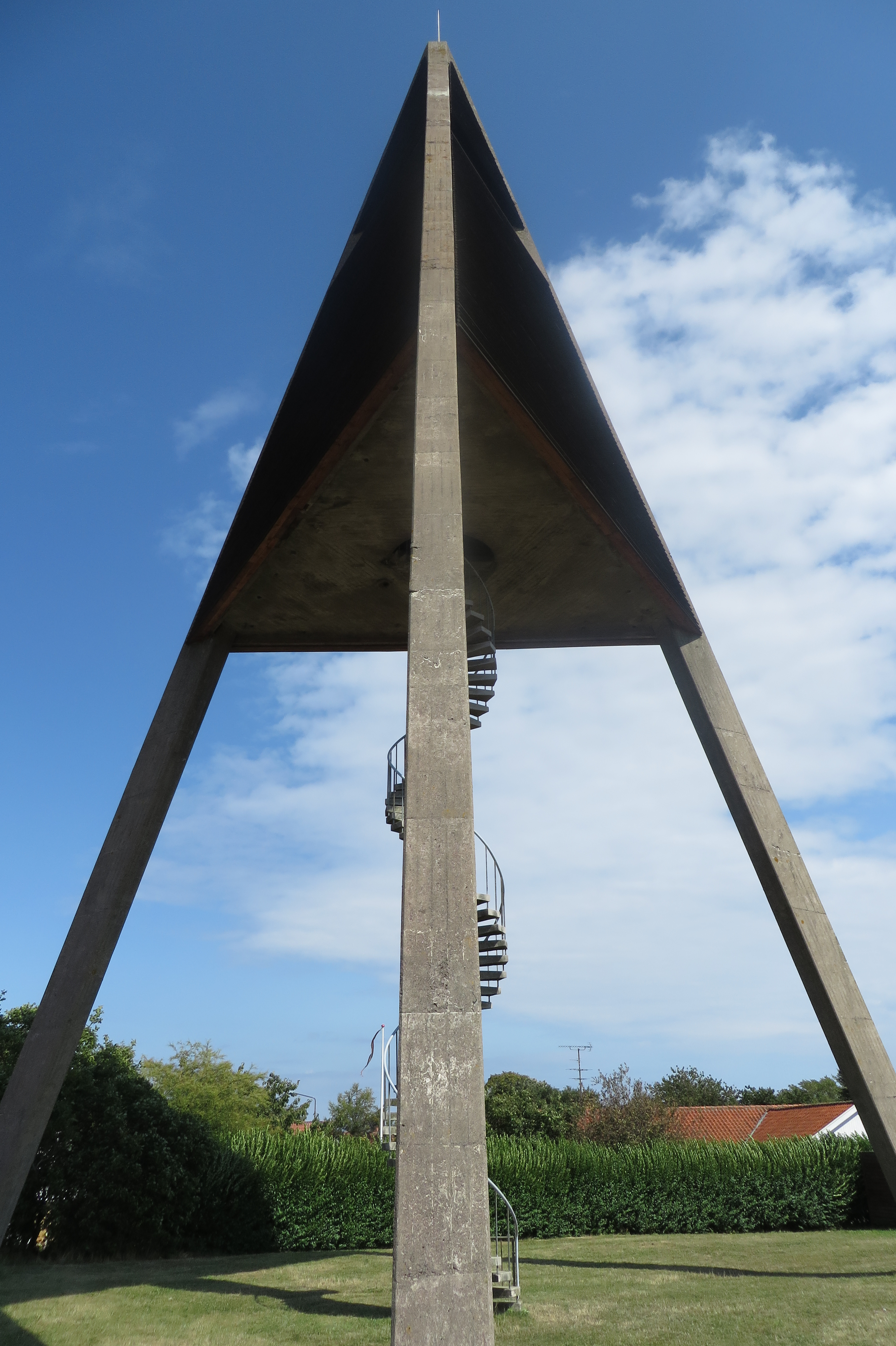

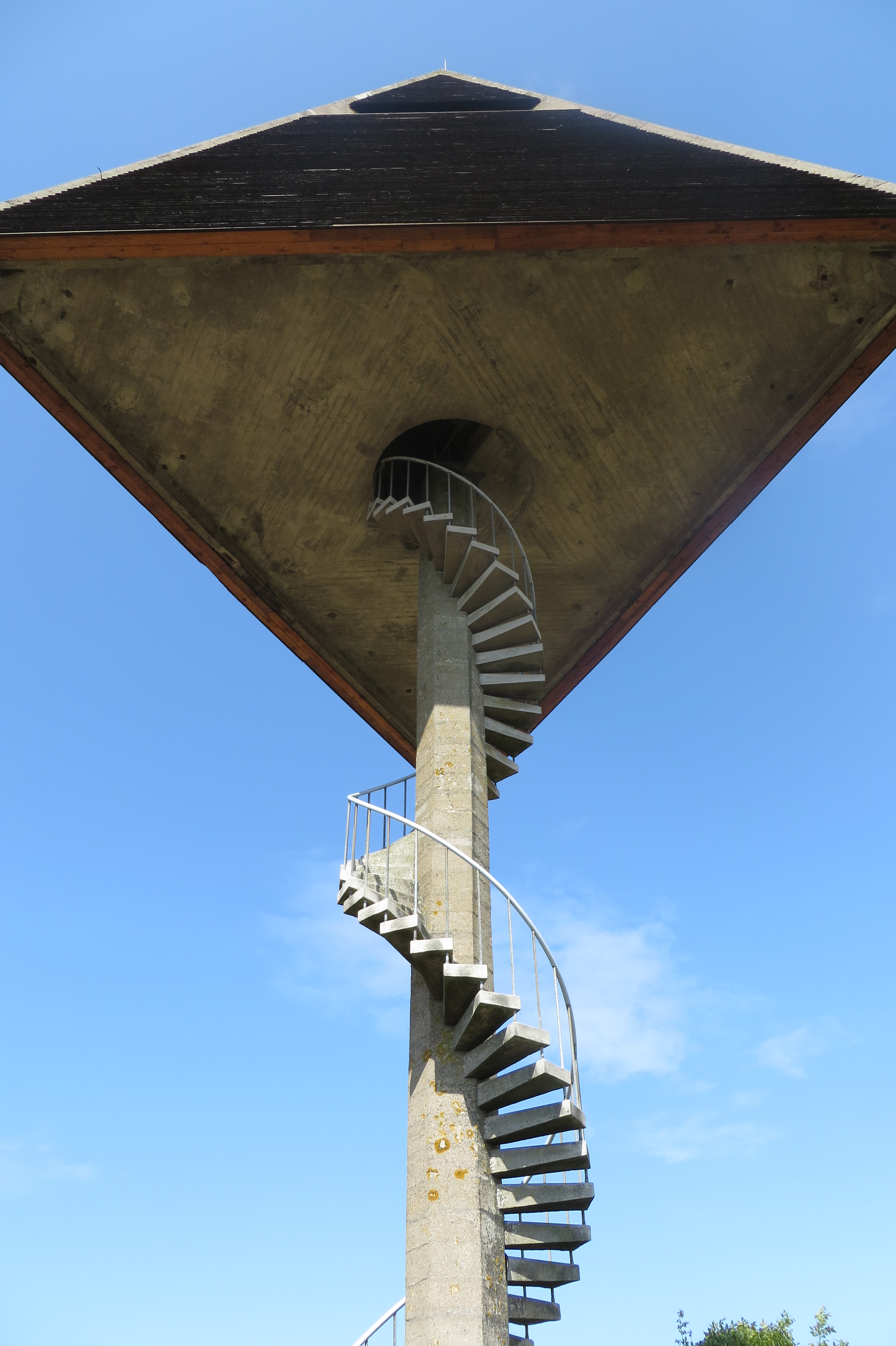

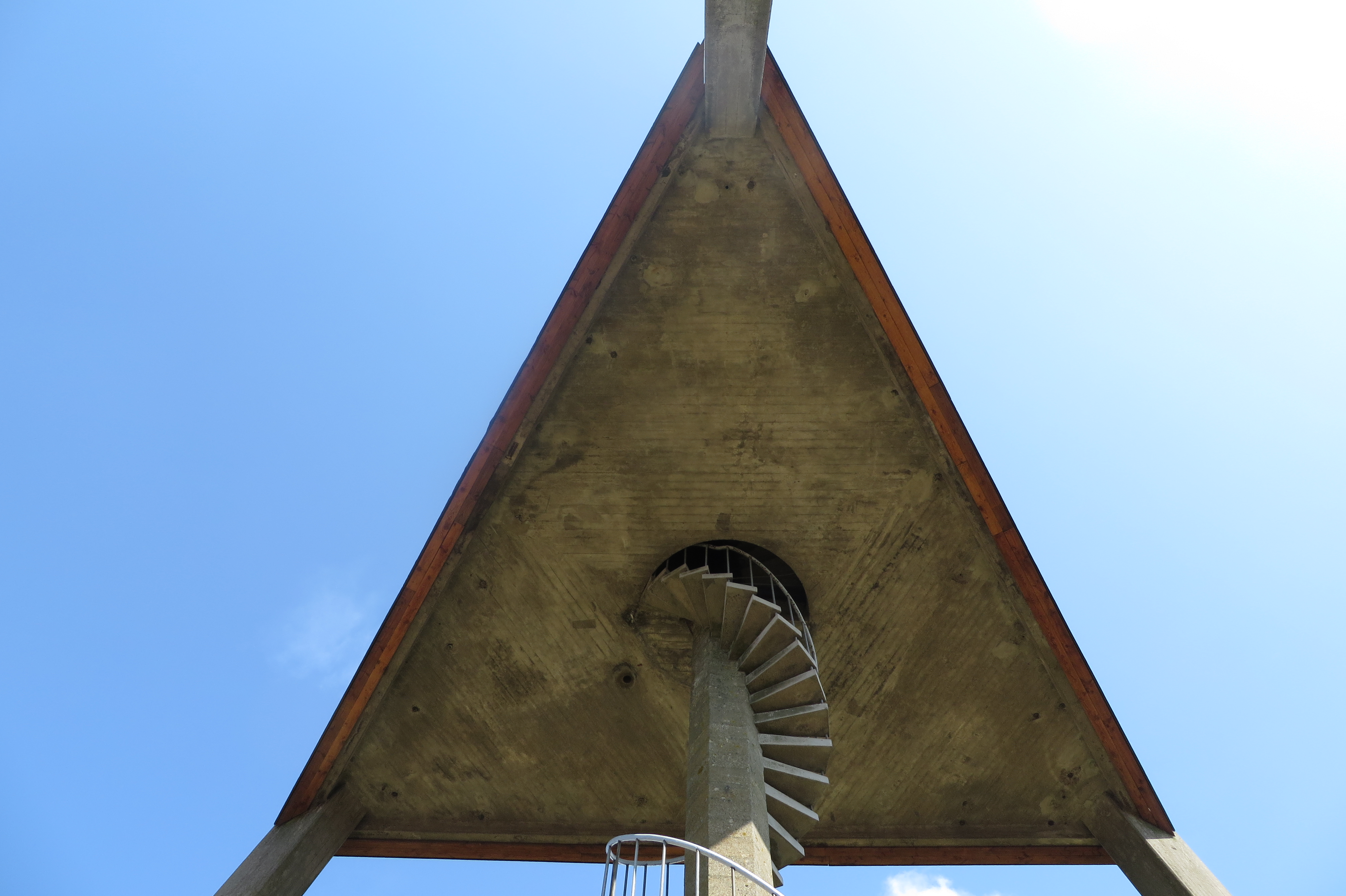

== See also ==
- Kugelbake
