= Kugelbake =

Day beacon in Cuxhaven, Germany

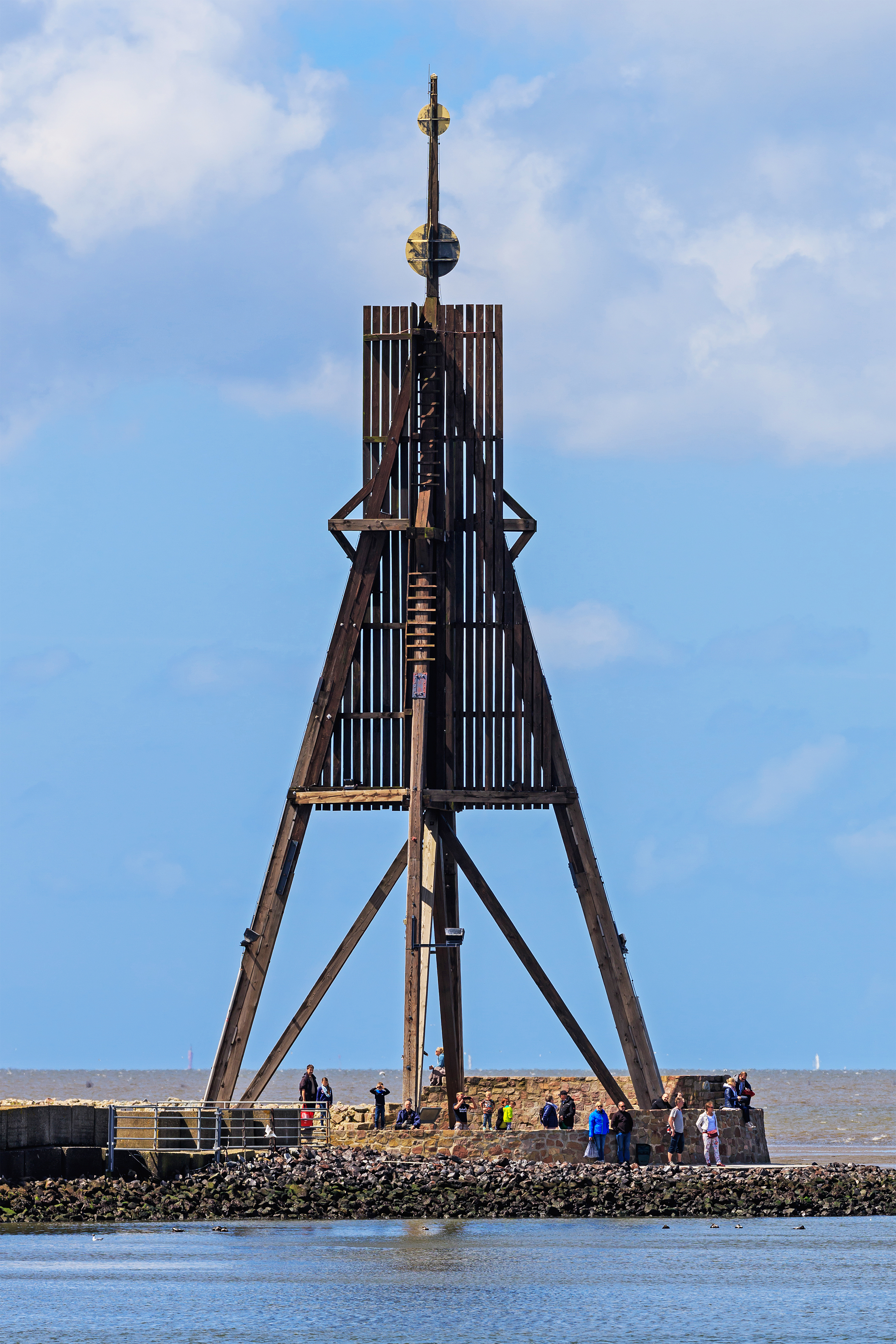
- Location: Cuxhaven, Germany
- Coordinates: 53°53′30″N 8°41′14″E
- Constructed: 1700s
- Construction: wood
- Height: 29 to 31 m (95 to 102 ft)
- Heritage: architectural heritage monument in Lower Saxony

The Kugelbake (German pronunciation: [ˈkuːɡl̩ˌbaːkə], lit. 'Ball Beacon') is a historic day beacon in the city of Cuxhaven, Germany, at the northernmost point of Lower Saxony, where the River Elbe flows into the North Sea. In the Low German dialect of the Middle Ages, the term bake referred to all navigational aids – including lighthouses. About 30 meters (100 feet) high and built of wood, the Kugelbake is the principal landmark of Cuxhaven; since 1913, it has been depicted on the city's coat of arms. Large wooden structures guiding mariners have stood on this spot for over 300 years.

== Position ==
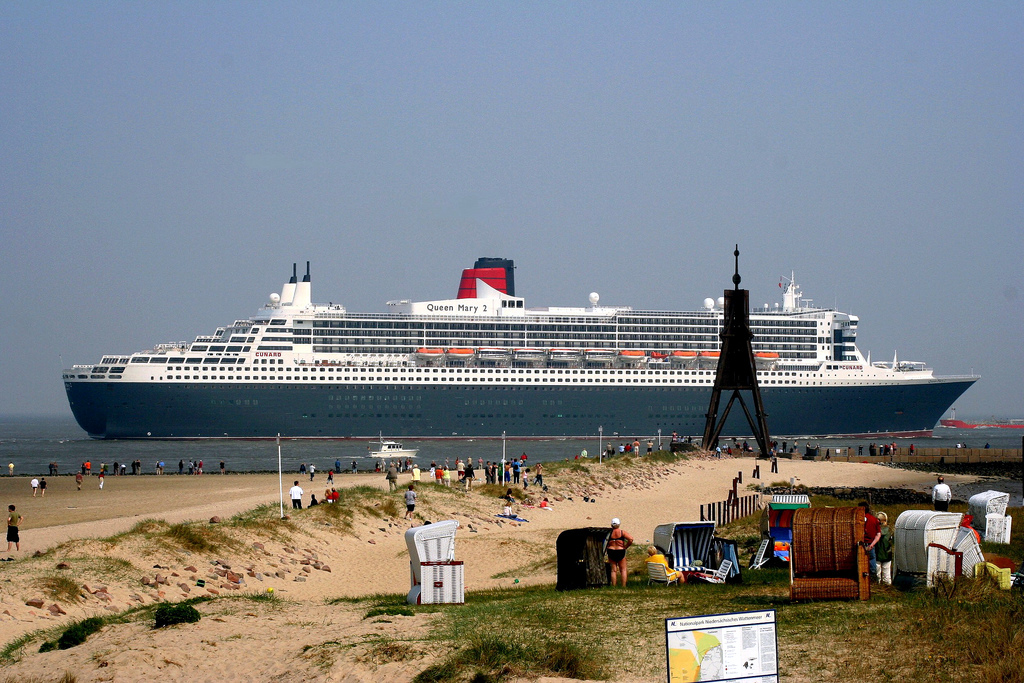
RMS Queen Mary 2 and the Kugelbake

The Kugelbake stands at a busy shipping lane in the Cuxhaven borough of Döse and was once a vital nautical landmark. At this point, the estuary is about 18 km wide. Geographically speaking, the Elbe ends here and the North Sea begins. From a nautical point of view, the Kugelbake can be said to separate the Outer and Lower portions of the Elbe. It is also regarded as the symbolic separation between the Elbe and Weser estuaries. Its distinctive design, well known to skippers, is now a popular tourist destination.

- Height above MHW: 29.63m

== History ==
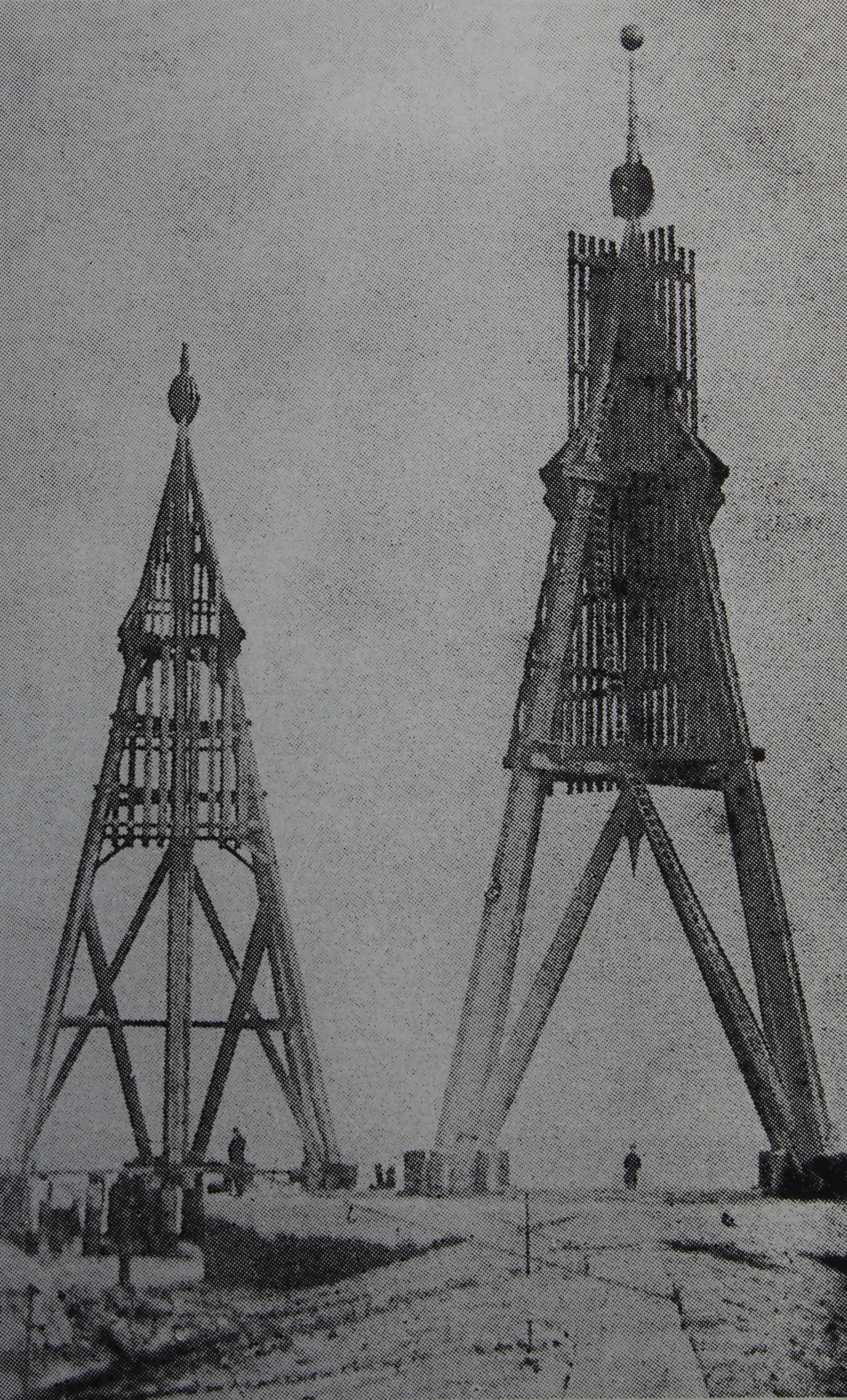
The old and new Kugelbaken in 1867

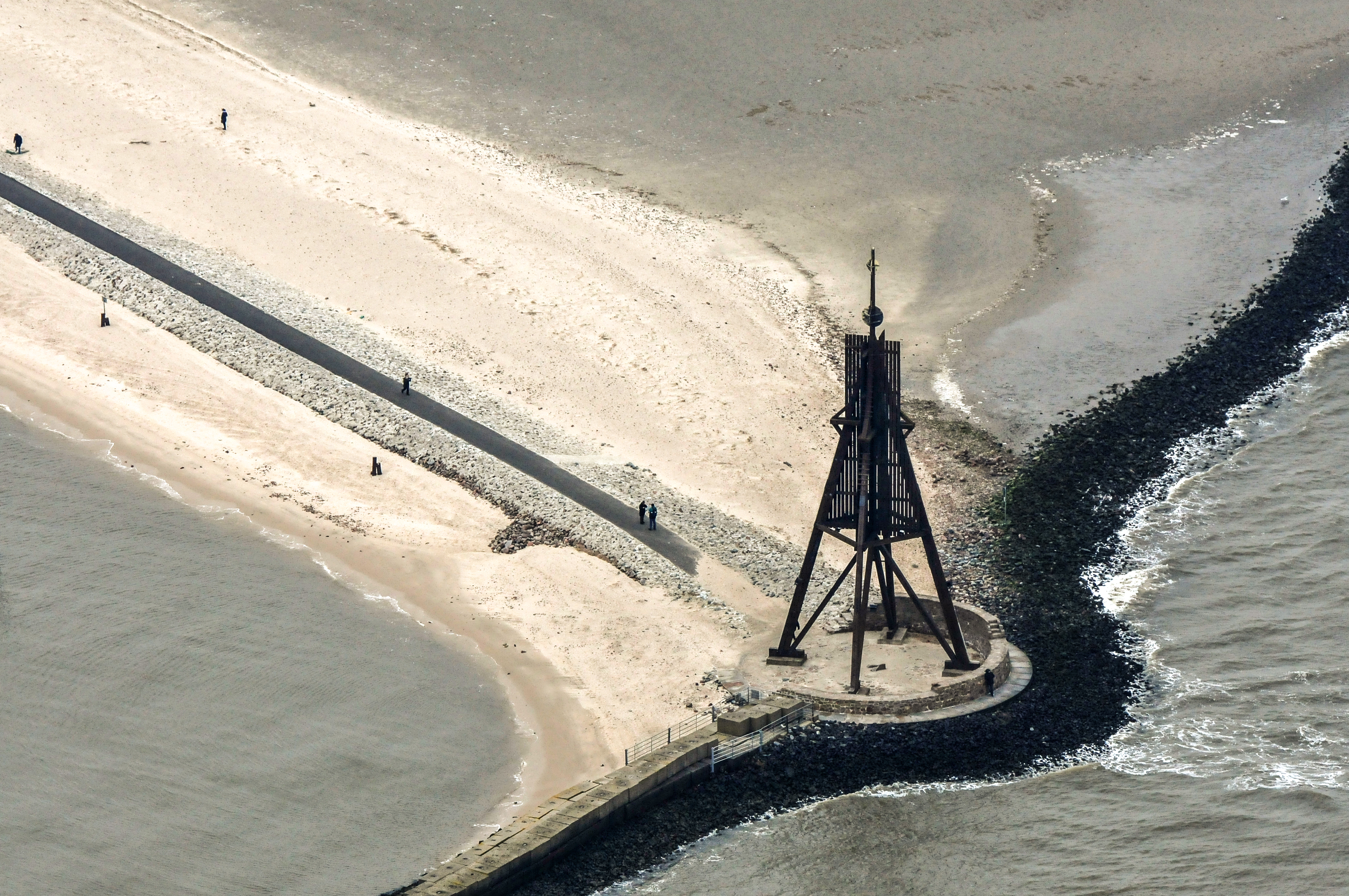

The first navigational aid was built on this spot around 1703 at the instigation of the Pilot Inspector Paul Allers after an existing bearing, a group of trees, was swept away by a fierce storm surge. It was constructed of wood and had a short service life due to the harsh weather and floods common on the point. It was rebuilt approximately every 30 years, the first reconstruction taking place around 1737.

In 1853, the Kugelbake was lit nightly to guide ships in the difficult curvature of the estuary. The light consisted of a fire in a small hut located inside the structure. By 1878 the light served only as a reserve because a lightvessel was placed in the channel throughout the year. At the outbreak of the Franco-Prussian War in 1870, the light was reduced to confuse potential enemies and in World War I it was completely removed for the same reason. In 1924 it was rebuilt, but instead of the eponymous ball, two round perpendicular composite discs were attached at the top. The current construction was built after 1945.

The Kugelbake was also the spot where amateur radio pioneer Jonathan Zenneck experimented with radio communications between the Mainland and ships at sea during the winter of 1899–1900. A wooden hut was built within the structure, equipped with the necessary antennas and technical equipment for the very first coastal radio station in Germany. The first transmissions were sent between the Kugelbake and the steamship Silvana to a distance of 32 km. In the autumn of 1900, transmissions were sent as far as the Elbe Islands and Heligoland, 63 km away.

In 2001 the Wasser- und Schifffahrtsverwaltung (English: Water and Shipping Administration) transferred the Kugelbake to the federal historic properties agency, since the beacon had lost its nautical importance. A foundation was established for the preservation of this historic landmark, which since 2002 has belonged to the city of Cuxhaven.

== Bearers of the name ==
A Ro-Ro vessel MV Kugelbake was built in 2009 for container traffic on the Elbe, registered at Cuxhaven. It has crew of 6, a displacement of 3900 metric tons, is 79.3 m long and 18.6 m wide, and is equipped with a 1900 kW power plant.

== See also ==
- Svaneke Water Tower

== Gallery ==
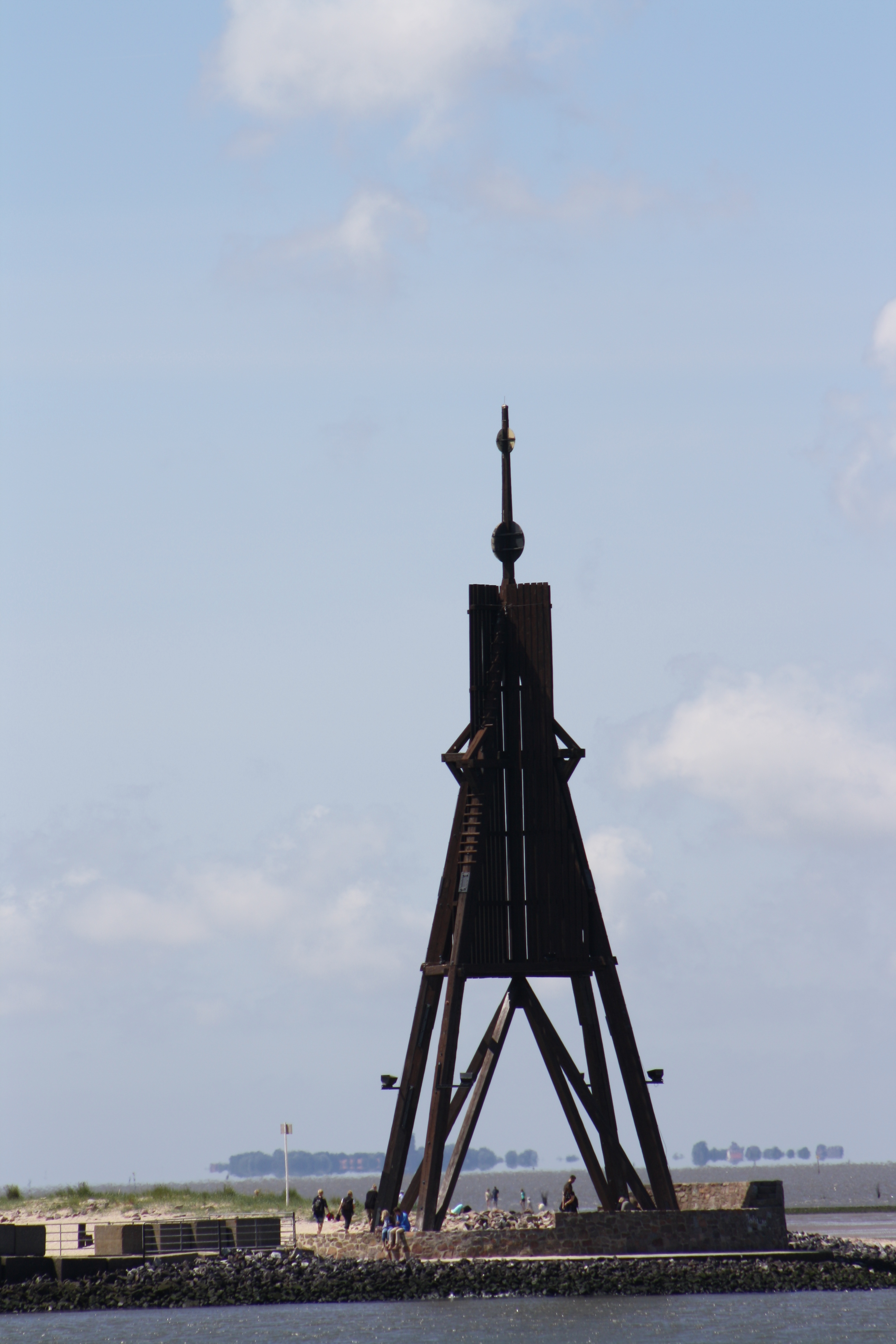
Kugelbake as seen from the tidal flats

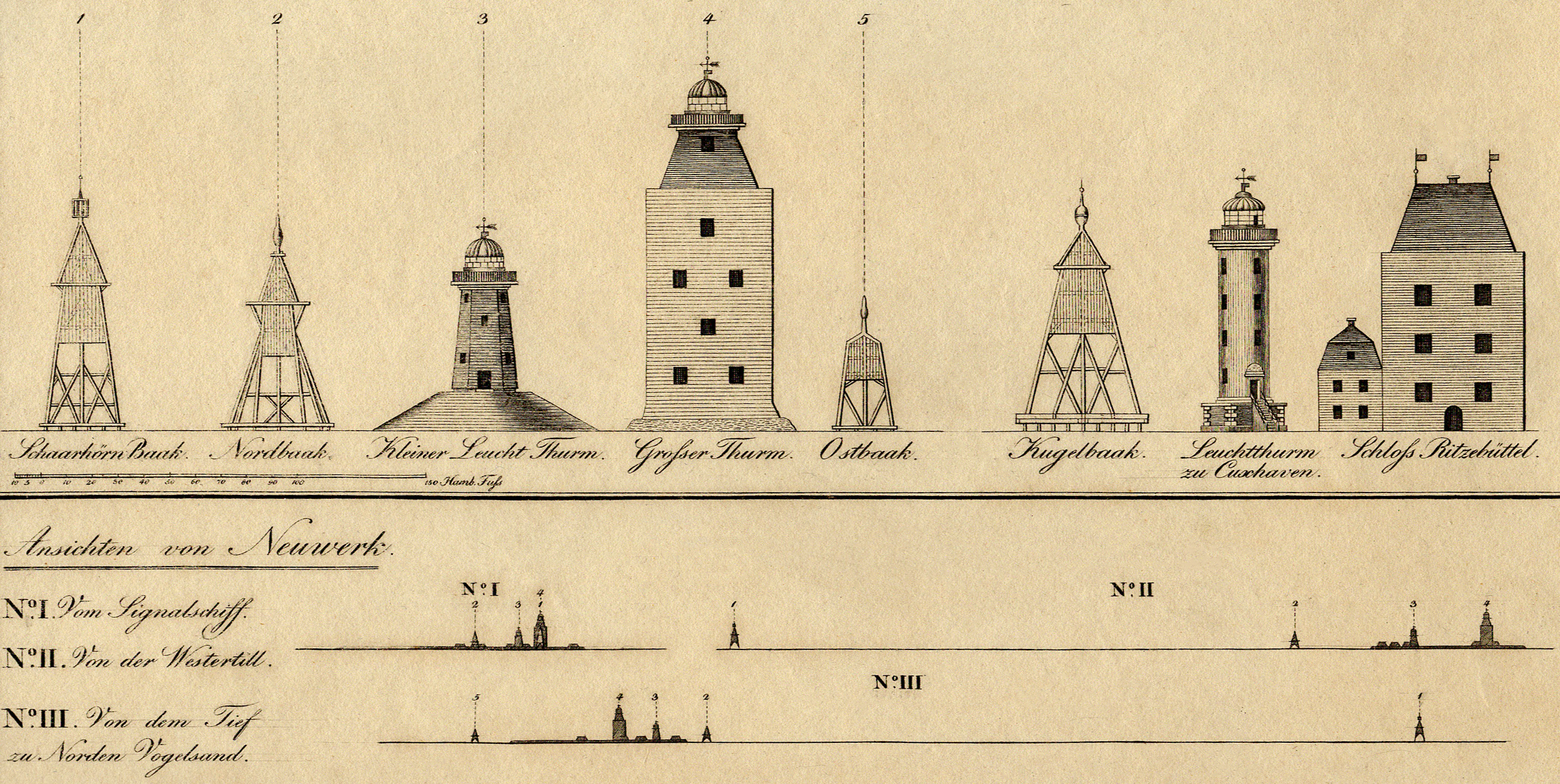
Lighthouses and day marks in the Elbe estuary (1831)
