= Döse =

- Stadtteil of Cuxhaven
- Döse in Cuxhaven
- Interactive map of Döse
- Location within Germany Location within Lower Saxony
- Coordinates: 53°52′58″N 08°40′22″E
- Country: Germany
- State: Lower Saxony
- District: Cuxhaven
- Town: Cuxhaven
- Elevation: 2 m (6.6 ft)

Population (2006-12-31)
  - Total: 12,773
- Time zone: UTC+01:00 (CET)
  - Summer (DST): UTC+02:00 (CEST)
- Postal codes: 27476
- Dialling codes: 04721
- Website: www.cuxhaven.de

Döse (Low German: Döös) the northernmost town in Lower Saxony, Germany at the point where the River Elbe flows into the North Sea. It is a borough of the city Cuxhaven and a popular seaside resort. Döse is located west of Grimmershörn in the borough of Cuxhaven and is one of the tourist centres of the region of Cuxland.

== History ==
Until 1937 Döse, like Cuxhaven, was part of the Land of Hamburg.

Historical population
Year	Pop.	±%
1826	510	—
1847	539	+5.7%
1905	2,230	+313.7%
2006	12,773	+472.8%

== Gallery ==
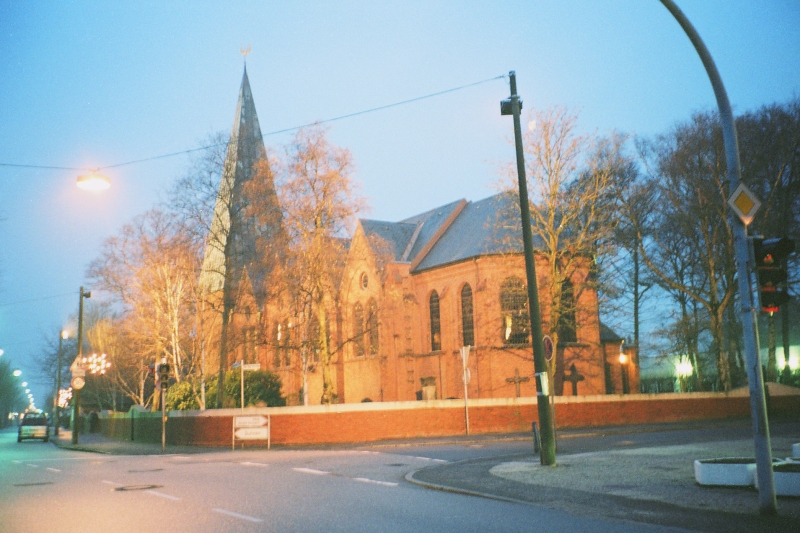
The Evangelical Lutheran "Döser Kirche": Döse Church of St. Gertrud's

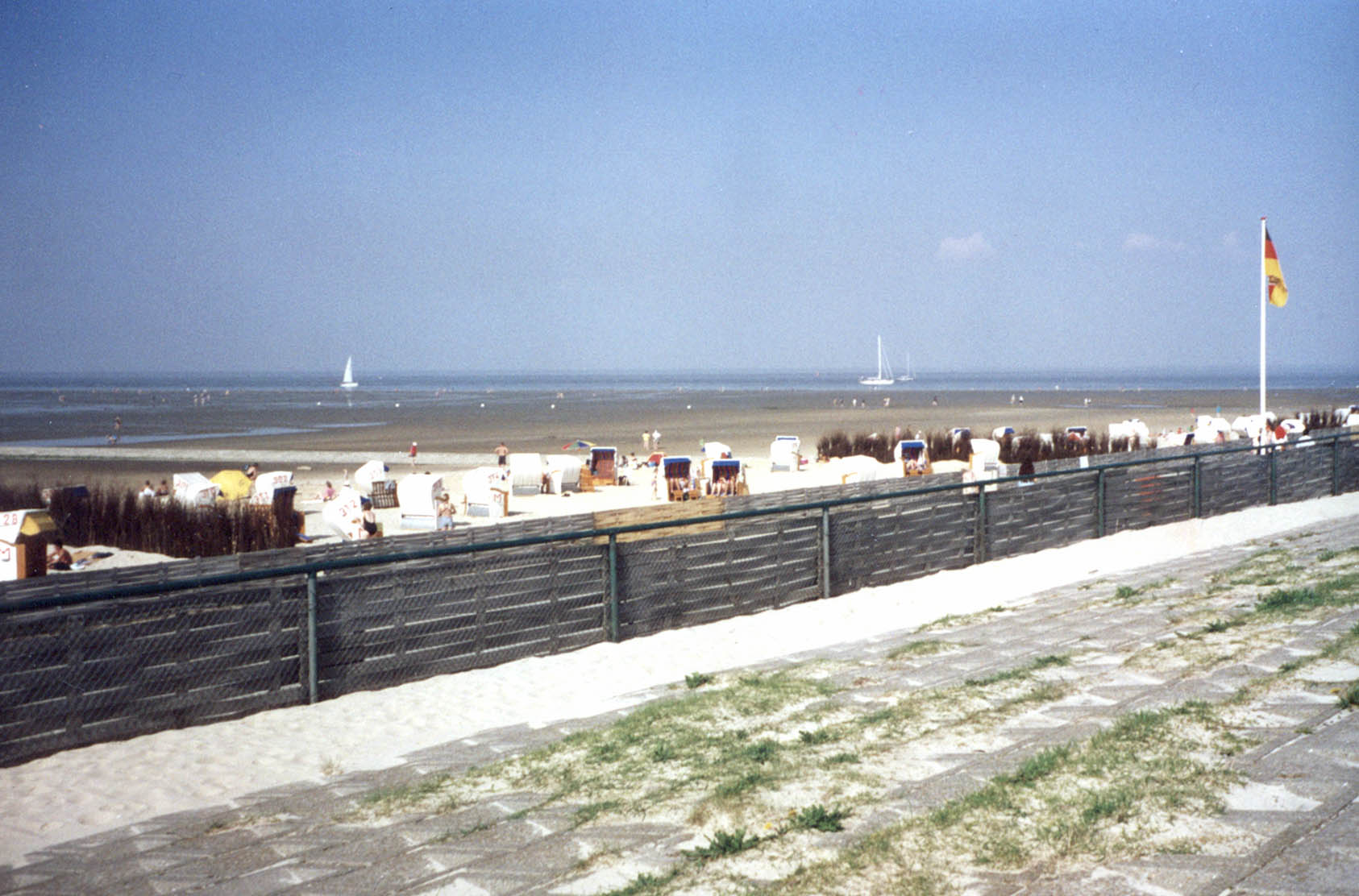
Beach at Döse

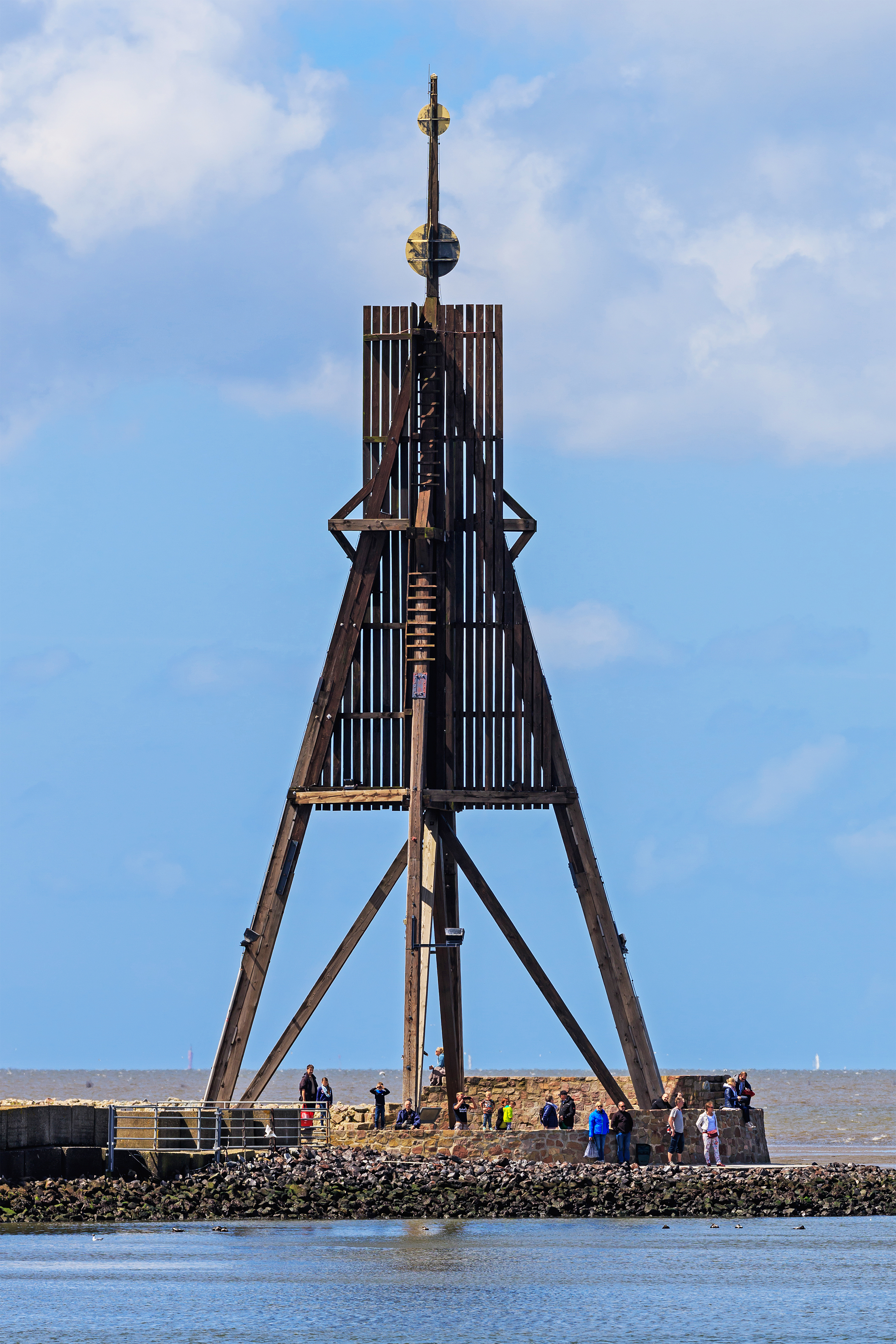
The Kugelbake, marking the northernmost point of Lower Saxony
