= OV3-6 =

US Air Force satellite

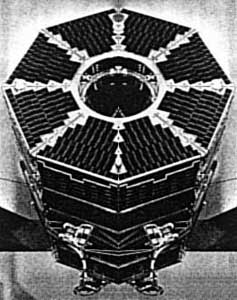
- An OV3 satellite (OV3-1)
- Mission type: Earth science
- Operator: USAF
- COSPAR ID: 1967-120A
- SATCAT no.: S03057

Spacecraft properties
- Manufacturer: Air Force Cambridge Research Laboratory
- Launch mass: 99 kg (218 lb)

Start of mission
- Launch date: 5 December 1967 01:03:46 UTC
- Rocket: Scout B
- Launch site: Vandenberg Space Launch Complex 5

End of mission
- Decay date: 29 September 1971

Orbital parameters
- Regime: Low Earth Orbit
- Eccentricity: 0.00198
- Perigee altitude: 412.00 km (256.00 mi)
- Apogee altitude: 439.00 km (272.78 mi)
- Inclination: 90.6°
- Period: 92.90 minutes
- Epoch: 5 December 1967 00:57:00

Orbiting Vehicle 3-6 (also known as OV3-6 and ATCOS 2 (ATmospheric COmposition Satellite 2)), launched 5 December 1967, was the sixth and last satellite to be launched in the OV3 series of the United States Air Force's Orbiting Vehicle program. The satellite measured electron density and neutral density ion composition, as functions of latitude and time. The satellite reentered the Earth's atmosphere on 9 March 1969.

== History ==
The Orbiting Vehicle satellite program arose from a US Air Force initiative, begun in the early 1960s, to reduce the expense of space research. Through this initiative, satellites would be standardized to improve reliability and cost-efficiency, and where possible, they would fly on test vehicles or be piggybacked with other satellites. In 1961, the Air Force Office of Aerospace Research (OAR) created the Aerospace Research Support Program (ARSP) to request satellite research proposals and choose mission experiments. The USAF Space and Missiles Organization created their own analog of the ARSP called the Space Experiments Support Program (SESP), which sponsored a greater proportion of technological experiments than the ARSP. Five distinct OV series of standardized satellites were developed under the auspices of these agencies.

Unlike the previously initiated OV1 and OV2 series of satellites, which were designed to use empty payload space on rocket test launches, the six OV3 satellites all had dedicated Scout boosters. In this regard, the OV3 series was more akin to its civilian science program counterparts (e.g. Explorer). OV3 differed from NASA programs in its heavy use of off-the-shelf equipment, which resulted in lower unit cost.

The first four satellites in the series were made the Aerojet subsidiary Space General Corporation under a $1.35m contract awarded 2 December 1964, the first satellite due October 1965. The last two satellites were built by Air Force Cambridge Research Laboratory (AFCRL), which also managed the entire series and provided four of the OV3 payloads.

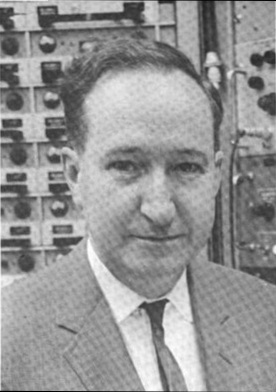
Charles H. Reynolds, Technical Manager of OV3

Charles H. Reynolds, who worked at AFCRL from 1955, was the technical manager for the OV3 program.

Prior to the launch of OV3-6, five other OV3 satellites had been launched (four successfully), all radiation measuring spacecraft. OV3-1 through OV3-4 were launched in 1966 while the unsuccessful OV3-5 was launched in January 1967.

== Spacecraft design ==
OV3-6 and OV3-5 were roughly identical satellites. Like the rest of the OV3 satellites, OV3-6 was an octagonal prism. As with OV3-5, its length differed from the earlier, Aerojet-produced OV3 satellites by being reduced from .74 m (2 ft 5 in) to .53 m (1 ft 9 in). Experiments were mounted on booms, and 2560 solar cells provided 30 Watts of power. Its design life-span was eight months owing to the low planned orbit. The satellite massed 219 lb (99 kg)

== Experiments ==
The purpose of OV3-6, also known as ATmospheric COmposition Satellite 2, was to study the variations of the atmosphere by latitude and over the course of the day, as well as and investigate the effects of solar disturbances on the composition and densities of neutral and ionized particles. To this end, it carried an aeronomy payload produced by AFCRL. Two radially mounted mass spectrometers and three cold-cathode ion-density gauges mounted along the spin axis of the satellite (to better detect small-scale variations in density than previous, radially mounted experiments), comprised one basic experiment under the direction of AFCRL's Rocco S. Narcisi and Joseph P. McIsaac. They measured atmospheric composition, density, pressure, and temperature. A boom-mounted rf impedance probe designed by AFCRL's James C. Ulwick, measured temperature irregularities and electron density. The other boom carried a magnetometer.

== Mission ==
Launched from Vandenberg Space Launch Complex 5 on 5 December 1967 at 00:57:00 UTC via Scout B rocket, OV3-6 was successfully placed into a nearly circular polar orbit. After approximately 80 complete orbits the onboard tape recorder failed in March 1968 limiting transmission of data to times when the satellite was within line-of-site of a ground station. Nevertheless, good experimental data were obtained throughout the satellite's 15-month lifetime. The neutral particles studied included neutral nitrogen and oxygen molecules, as well as free oxygen atoms. The ionized particles measured by OV3-6 included atomic hydrogen, helium, oxygen, nitrogen, and neon, as well as nitric oxide and oxygen molecules. The satellite reentered the Earth's atmosphere on 9 March 1969.

== Results and legacy ==
OV3-6 measured much larger latitude variations than current atmospheric models had expected. A bulge in the neutral density in the summer hemisphere was also discovered. The data obtained was used to construct more accurate atmospheric models, and to correlate physical chemistry reactions to disturbances originating from the sun.

This sixth OV3 satellite was the last of the program, its mission to be continued by the cheaper OV1 program.
