= OV1-15 =

US Air Force satellite

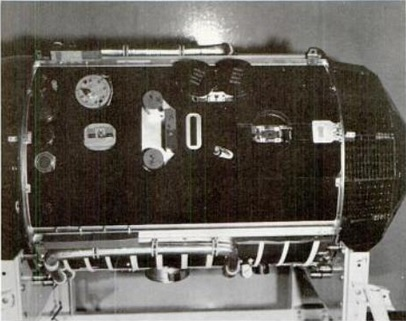
- OV1-15 satellite
- Mission type: Earth science
- Operator: USAF
- COSPAR ID: 1968-059A
- SATCAT no.: S03318

Spacecraft properties
- Manufacturer: General Dynamics
- Launch mass: 215 kg (474 lb)

Start of mission
- Launch date: 11 July 1968 UTC
- Rocket: Atlas F
- Launch site: Vandenberg 576-A-2

End of mission
- Decay date: 6 November 1968

Orbital parameters
- Regime: Low Earth Orbit
- Eccentricity: 0.11291
- Perigee altitude: 154.00 km (95.69 mi)
- Apogee altitude: 1,818.00 km (1,129.65 mi)
- Inclination: 104.82°
- Period: 89.880 minutes
- Epoch: 11 July 1968 19:26:00 UTC

Orbiting Vehicle 1–15 (also known as OV1-15 and SPADES (Solar Perturbation of Atmospheric Density Experimental Satellite)), launched 11 July 1968, was the first satellite (along with its companion, OV1-16) to return long-term information on the density of the Earth's upper atmosphere. Part of the OV1 series of USAF satellites, using standardized designs and sent to orbit on decommissioned Atlas ICBMs to reduce development and launching costs, OV1-15 was launched via Atlas F side-by-side with OV1-16. Before its orbit decayed, causing the satellite to reenter on 8 November 1968, OV1-15 profoundly improved our knowledge of the upper atmosphere, proving that air density increased with solar activity rather than decreasing, as had been the prevailing theory to that time.

== History ==
The Orbiting Vehicle satellite program arose from a US Air Force initiative, begun in the early 1960s, to reduce the expense of space research. Through this initiative, satellites would be standardized to improve reliability and cost-efficiency, and where possible, they would fly on test vehicles or be piggybacked with other satellites. In 1961, the Air Force Office of Aerospace Research (OAR) created the Aerospace Research Support Program (ARSP) to request satellite research proposals and choose mission experiments. The USAF Space and Missiles Organization created their own analog of the ARSP called the Space Experiments Support Program (SESP), which sponsored a greater proportion of technological experiments than the ARSP. Five distinct OV series of standardized satellites were developed under the auspices of these agencies.

The OV1 program, managed by Lt. Col. Clyde Northcott Jr. was an evolution of the 2.7 m "Scientific Passenger Pods" (SPP), which, starting on 2 October 1961, rode piggyback on suborbital Atlas missile tests and conducted scientific experiments during their short time in space. General Dynamics received a $2 million contract on 13 September 1963 to build a new version of the SPP (called the Atlas Retained Structure (ARS)) that would carry a self-orbiting satellite. Once the Atlas missile and ARS reached apogee, the satellite inside would be deployed and thrust itself into orbit. In addition to the orbital SPP, General Dynamics would create six of these satellites, each to be 3.66 m (12.0 ft) long with a diameter of .762 m (2 ft 6.0 in), able to carry a 136 kg (300 lb) payload into a circular 805 km (500 mi) orbit.

Dubbed "Satellite for Aerospace Research" (SATAR), the series of satellites was originally to be launched from the Eastern Test Range on Atlas missions testing experimental Advanced Ballistic Re-Entry System (ABRES) nosecones. However, in 1964, the Air Force transferred ABRES launches to the Western Test Range causing a year's delay for the program. Moreover, because WTR launches would be into polar orbit as opposed to the low-inclination orbits typical of ETR launches, less mass could be lofted into orbit using the same thrust, and the mass of the SATAR satellites had to be reduced.

Prior to the double launch of which OV1-15 was a part, there had been 14 satellites in the OV1 series, the first orbited on January 21, 1965. After OV1-1, the last ABRES test launch, OV1-2 through 12 were launched on decommissioned Atlas D ICBMs, with the exception of OV1-6, launched via the Titan IIIC tasked for the Manned Orbiting Laboratory test flight. OV1-13 and OV1-14 were the first to be launched on a decommissioned Atlas F.

== Spacecraft design ==
OV1-15, like the rest of the OV1 satellite series, consisted of a cylindrical experiment housing capped with flattened cones on both ends containing 5000 solar cells producing 22 watts of power. Continuing the design trend started with OV1-7, the solar cells were flat rather than curved, as had been in the case with the first six OV1 satellites. Two .46 m (1 ft 6 in) antennae for transmitting telemetry and receiving commands extended from the sides of the spacecraft. 12 helium-pressurized hydrogen peroxide thrusters provided attitude control. OV1-15 was spin-stabilized.

== Experiments ==
OV1-15's primary mission was to measure the effects of geogmagnetic storms caused by the sun on atmospheric density, composition, and temperature. This was important to the Air Force as these storms were believed to be slightly perturbing the orbits of USAF satellites, making it difficult to predict where a decaying satellite might reenter. Up to the launch of OV1-15 and 16, virtually nothing was known about the density of the atmosphere at altitudes between 100 km (62 mi) and 200 km (120 mi)—only a few brief sounding rocket flights had probed that region. Theoretical models had suggested that air density would decrease with increased solar activity (the opposite of what the two OV1 satellites ultimately discovered)

OV1-15's instrument package included a microphone density gauge, an ion gauge, mass spectrometers, energetic particle detectors, solar X ray and UV flux monitors, an ionospheric monitor, and a triaxial accelerometer. This last device, dubbed "MESA", was specifically built for OV1-15 and OV1-16 by Bell Aerospace to measure atmospheric drag on the spacecraft as its orbit decayed. The experiments on OV1-15 not only evaluated the environment in the satellite's vicinity, they also helped determine its attitude (orientation with respect to Earth) in space.

== Mission ==
OV1-15 was launched from Vandenberg's 576-A-2 launch pad along with OV1-16 on an Atlas F rocket on 11 July 1968 at around 19:30:00 UTC into an eccentric medium orbit that took it from 1,818.00 km (1,129.65 mi) above the Earth to an atmosphere-scraping altitude of just 154.00 km (95.69 mi).

The spacecraft functioned normally after launch, reentering Earth's atmosphere on 6 November 1968. In addition to returning data on atmospheric fluctuations caused by solar storms, OV1-15 also determined that the density of the upper atmosphere was 30% lower than predicted. Data from OV1-15 and 16 refuted the prevailing theory at the time that atmospheric density would decrease with increased solar activity. In fact, it increased. The satellites also found that the density of the upper atmosphere was not uniform, with pockets of denser and less dense gas.

== Results ==
The findings of OV1-15 and 16 quickly led to refined models of the upper atmosphere of immediate use to the Air Force and the Department of Defense. Their data proved that increased solar activity increased the air density at high altitudes, contradicting the prevailing model of the time. Moreover, the satellites determined that the density of the upper atmosphere was 10% lower than predicted by theoretical models.

The OV1 program ultimately comprised 22 missions, the last flying on 19 September 1971.
