= OV1-16 =

US Air Force satellite

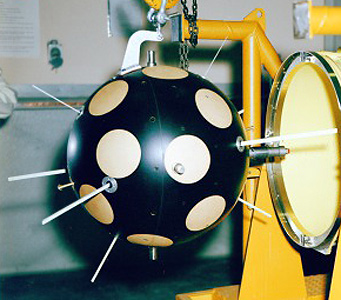
- OV1-16 satellite
- Mission type: Earth science
- Operator: USAF
- COSPAR ID: 1968-059B
- SATCAT no.: S03319

Spacecraft properties
- Manufacturer: General Dynamics
- Launch mass: 272 kg (600 lb)

Start of mission
- Launch date: 11 July 1968 UTC
- Rocket: Atlas F
- Launch site: Vandenberg 576-A-2

Orbital parameters
- Regime: Low Earth Orbit
- Eccentricity: 0.02900
- Perigee altitude: 163 km (101 mi)
- Apogee altitude: 554 km (344 mi)
- Inclination: 89.700°
- Period: 91 minutes
- Epoch: 11 July 1968 19:26:00 UTC

Orbiting Vehicle 1–16 (also known as OV1-16, LOADS1 (Low Altitude Density Satellite 1), and Cannonball 1), was launched 11 July 1968 via Atlas F side-by-side with OV1-15. Part of the OV1 series of USAF satellites, OV1-16 was a small, extremely dense sphere, able to withstand air drag much better than a conventional satellite. Along with OV1-15, it was the first satellite to return long-term information on the density and weather patterns of the Earth's upper atmosphere to better predict satellite orbits as well as the splash-down points of reentering satellites and spacecraft. The satellite reentered the Earth's atmosphere on 19 August 1968 after 39 days in orbit.

== History ==
The Orbiting Vehicle satellite program arose from a US Air Force initiative, begun in the early 1960s, to reduce the expense of space research. Through this initiative, satellites would be standardized to improve reliability and cost-efficiency, and where possible, they would fly on test vehicles or be piggybacked with other satellites. In 1961, the Air Force Office of Aerospace Research (OAR) created the Aerospace Research Support Program (ARSP) to request satellite research proposals and choose mission experiments. The USAF Space and Missiles Organization created their own analog of the ARSP called the Space Experiments Support Program (SESP), which sponsored a greater proportion of technological experiments than the ARSP. Five distinct OV series of standardized satellites were developed under the auspices of these agencies.

The OV1 program, managed by Lt. Col. Clyde Northcott Jr. was an evolution of the 2.7 m "Scientific Passenger Pods" (SPP), which, starting on 2 October 1961, rode piggyback on suborbital Atlas missile tests and conducted scientific experiments during their short time in space. General Dynamics received a $2 million contract on 13 September 1963 to build a new version of the SPP (called the Atlas Retained Structure (ARS)) that would carry a self-orbiting satellite. Once the Atlas missile and ARS reached apogee, the satellite inside would be deployed and thrust itself into orbit. In addition to the orbital SPP, General Dynamics would create six of these satellites, each to be 3.66 m (12.0 ft) long with a diameter of .762 m (2 ft 6.0 in), able to carry a 136 kg (300 lb) payload into a circular 805 km (500 mi) orbit.

Dubbed "Satellite for Aerospace Research" (SATAR), the series of satellites was originally to be launched from the Eastern Test Range on Atlas missions testing experimental Advanced Ballistic Re-Entry System (ABRES) nosecones. However, in 1964, the Air Force transferred ABRES launches to the Western Test Range causing a year's delay for the program. Moreover, because WTR launches would be into polar orbit as opposed to the low-inclination orbits typical of ETR launches, less mass could be lofted into orbit using the same thrust, and the mass of the SATAR satellites had to be reduced.

Prior to the double launch of which OV1-16 was a part, there had been 14 satellites in the OV1 series, the first orbited on January 21, 1965. After OV1-1, the last ABRES test launch, OV1-2 through 12 were launched on decommissioned Atlas D ICBMs, with the exception of OV1-6, launched via the Titan IIIC tasked for the Manned Orbiting Laboratory test flight. OV1-13 and OV1-14 were the first to be launched on a decommissioned Atlas F.

== Spacecraft design ==
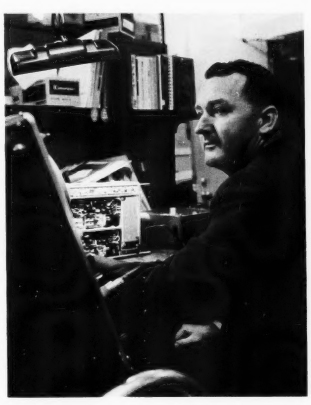
AFCRL's Dr. Kenneth S. W. Champion reviews the OV1-16 satellite

OV1-16 was developed to return information on the weather patterns, particularly the short-term changes in atmospheric density, of the upper atmosphere. This information is useful in predicting satellite orbits as well as the splash-down points of reentering satellites and spacecraft. Up to the launch of OV1-15 and 16, virtually nothing was known about the density of the atmosphere at altitudes between 100 km (62 mi) and 200 km (120 mi)—only a few brief sounding rocket flights had probed that region. Theoretical models had suggested that air density would decrease with increased solar activity (the opposite of what the two OV1 satellites ultimately discovered)

Dr. Kenneth S. W. Champion, Chief of the Atmospheric Structure Branch at AFCRL's Aeronomy Laboratory since 1964, designed the OV1-16 satellite. Unlike most of the standardized, cylindrical OV1 satellites, OV1-16 was a 600 lb (270 kg), 23 in (580 mm) diameter sphere with a solid brass shell 2.5 cm (0.98 in) thick, making it the densest (690.5 kg/m^{3} (1,163.9 lb/cu yd) satellite yet launched. This unusually high density was a design feature: by creating a vehicle with as large a mass/area ratio as possible, the satellite was more resistant to wind resistance. Thus, OV1-16 could stay in orbit, measuring the properties of lower thermosphere between 145 km (90 mi) and 177 km (110 mi) above the Earth, far longer than conventional satellites, which would be forced to reenter almost immediately at such a low altitude.

Several retractable antennas were used to transmit telemetry, while two small antennas were employed by a radar tracking beacon. The satellite was painted black with gold-plated circular areas to moderate heat from sunlight and atmospheric heating. The battery-powered satellite carried no onboard tape recorder, instead transmitting to 12 ground stations when in range.

== Experiments ==
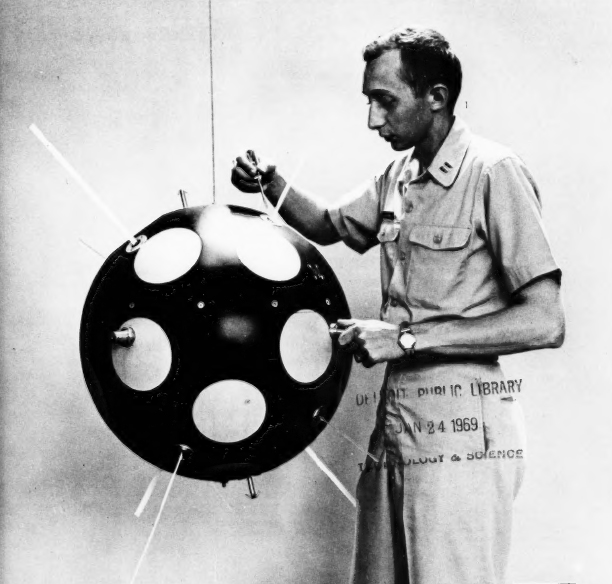
OV1-16 and Captain James D. Brown of AFCRL

The main instrument on OV1-16 was a triaxial acceleration sensor developed by the Bell Aerospace Corporation. It consisted of three mutually perpendicular linear "Miniature Electrostatic Accelerometers" (MESA). The instrument calculated air density by measuring the electrostatic force required to restrain a hollow cylindrical mass as the satellite experienced wind drag. Though in principle, the device could measure drag accelerations as low as 10^{-8} g, but in practice the satellite's measurements were in the range 5×10^{-5} g to 1×^{-7} g due to data noise, imperfect location of the accelerometers, and the spacecraft's rotation. The satellite's radio beacon also facilitated tracking of the satellite, the path of which also revealed details of the air density of the atmosphere it traveled through.

== Mission ==
OV1-16 was launched from Vandenberg's 576-A-2 launch pad along with OV1-15 on an Atlas F rocket on 11 July 1968 at around 19:30:00 UTC into an eccentric medium orbit that took it from 554.00 km (344.24 mi) above the Earth to an atmosphere-scraping altitude of just 163.00 km (101.28 mi). The satellite reentered the Earth's atmosphere on 19 August 1968 after 39 days in orbit. More than 200 data acquisitions were received by ground stations, and the satellite's mission was deemed very successful.

== Results ==
The findings of OV1-15 and 16 quickly led to refined models of the upper atmosphere of immediate use to the Air Force and the Department of Defense. Their data proved that increased solar activity increased the air density at high altitudes, contradicting the prevailing model of the time. Moreover, the satellites determined that the density of the upper atmosphere was 10% lower than predicted by theoretical models.

The OV1 program ultimately comprised 22 missions, the last flying on 19 September 1971.
