= OV3-3 =

US Air Force satellite

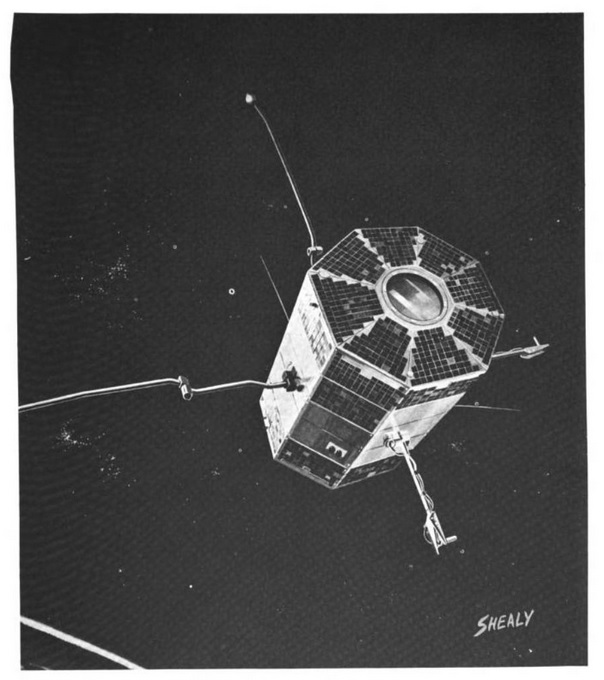
- OV3-2 (OV3-3 similar)
- Mission type: Earth science
- Operator: USAF
- COSPAR ID: 1966-070A
- SATCAT no.: S02201

Spacecraft properties
- Manufacturer: Space General
- Launch mass: 75 kg (165 lb)

Start of mission
- Launch date: 4 August 1966 10:45:01 UTC
- Rocket: Scout B
- Launch site: Vandenberg Space Launch Complex 5

Orbital parameters
- Regime: Medium Earth Orbit
- Eccentricity: 0.23453
- Perigee altitude: 360.00 km (223.69 mi)
- Apogee altitude: 4,492.00 km (2,791.20 mi)
- Inclination: 81.440°
- Period: 137 minutes
- Epoch: 4 August 1966 10:48:00

Orbiting Vehicle 3-3 (also known as OV3-3), launched 4 August 1966, was the third satellite to be launched in the OV3 series of the United States Air Force's Orbiting Vehicle program. The satellite measured charged particles in orbit so that their danger to space-based payloads could be assessed. OV3-3 is still in orbit as of 29 July 2021.

== History ==
The Orbiting Vehicle satellite program arose from a US Air Force initiative, begun in the early 1960s, to reduce the expense of space research. Through this initiative, satellites would be standardized to improve reliability and cost-efficiency, and where possible, they would fly on test vehicles or be piggybacked with other satellites. In 1961, the Air Force Office of Aerospace Research (OAR) created the Aerospace Research Support Program (ARSP) to request satellite research proposals and choose mission experiments. The USAF Space and Missiles Organization created their own analog of the ARSP called the Space Experiments Support Program (SESP), which sponsored a greater proportion of technological experiments than the ARSP. Five distinct OV series of standardized satellites were developed under the auspices of these agencies.

Unlike the previously initiated OV1 and OV2 series of satellites, which were designed to use empty payload space on rocket test launches, the six OV3 satellites all had dedicated Scout boosters. In this regard, the OV3 series was more akin to its civilian science program counterparts (e.g. Explorer). OV3 differed from NASA programs in its heavy use of off-the-shelf equipment, which resulted in lower unit cost.

The first four satellites in the series were made the Aerojet subsidiary Space General Corporation under a $1.35m contract awarded 2 December 1964, the first satellite due October 1965. The last two satellites were built by Air Force Cambridge Research Laboratory (AFCRL), which also managed the entire series and provided four of the OV3 payloads.

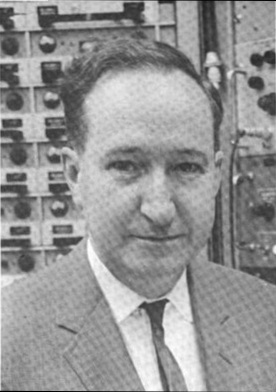
Charles H. Reynolds, Technical Manager of OV3

Charles H. Reynolds, who worked at AFCRL from 1955, was the technical manager for the OV3 program.

Prior to the launch of OV3-3, two other OV3 satellites had been placed into orbit. OV3-1, launched 22 April 1966, measured radiation around the Earth, returning data for over a year. Launched on 10 June 1966, OV3-4 was the second in the OV3 satellite series. It measured the effects of radiation on tissue-equivalent samples.

== Spacecraft design ==
Like the rest of the OV3 satellites, OV3-3 was an octagonal prism, .74 m (2 ft 5 in) in length and width, with experiments mounted on booms. 2560 solar cells provided 30 Watts of power. The satellite was spin-stabilized, but because it was asymmetrical once its booms were extended, OV3-3 maintained its attitude in orbit with a precession damper. The spacecraft was spin stabilized at 8 revolutions per minute (rpm) A Sun sensor, as well as an onboard tri-axial magnetnometer, gave information on the satellite's aspect (facing), its spin rate, and rate of precession.

OV3-3 massed 75 kg (165 lb). Its design life-span was one year.

== Experiments ==
OV3-3's scientific payload consisted of seven experiments originally flown on the failed OV2-1 mission. Designed to measure particle radiation over a wide energy spectrum, the instruments included a Faraday Cup electrometer, two directional telescopes, and three spectrometers. OV3-3 also carried a magnetometer to measure magnetic fields and plasma fluctuations, aided in this by its VLF radio receiver.

== Mission ==
Launched from Vandenberg Space Launch Complex 5 on 4 August 1966 at 10:45:01 UTC via Scout B rocket into a polar orbit, OV3-3 was the third satellite to be launched in the OV3 series. The satellite measured trapped and precipitating particles and their correlated electromagnetic wave fields. Its systems performed well for 14 months until the onboard tape recorder failed in September 1967. Low-latitude, real-time tracking continued into 1969 when the spacecraft was deactivated.

OV3-3 instruments returned data on solar protons, and data received from the satellite's VLF receiver determined the location of the plasmapause (the outer boundary of the Earth's inner magnetosphere).

== Legacy and status ==
As of 29 July 2021, OV3-3 is still in orbit, and its position can be tracked on-line.

The OV3 program ultimately comprised 6 missions, five of them successful. The last (OV3-6) flew on 4 December 1967. The OV3 program was terminated following OV3-6 in favor of the cheaper OV1 program.
