= Orbiting Vehicle =

American satellite family

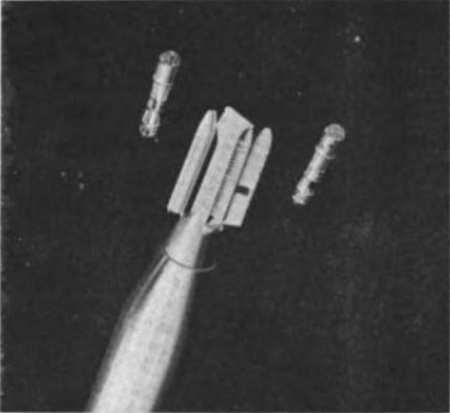
OV1 satellites launched with primary payload on an Atlas rocket

Orbiting Vehicle or OV, originally designated SATAR (SATellite - Atmospheric Research), comprised five different series of standardized American satellites operated by the US Air Force, launched between 1965 and 1971. Forty seven satellites were built, of which forty three were launched and thirty seven reached orbit. With the exception of the OV3 series and OV4-3, they were launched as secondary payloads, using excess space on other missions. This resulted in extremely low launch costs and short proposal-to-orbit times. Typically, OV satellites carried scientific and/or technological experiments, 184 being successfully orbited through the lifespan of the program. A common research focus was assessing the hazards of the near Earth environment to astronauts and equipment.

The first OV series, designated OV1, was built by General Dynamics and carried on suborbital Atlas missile tests; the satellites subsequently placed themselves into orbit by means of an Altair-2 kick motor. The three (of five planned) Northrop-built OV2 satellites were built using parts left over following the cancellation of the Advanced Research Environmental Test Satellite and flew on Titan IIIC test flights. Space General built the OV3 satellites, the only series to be launched on dedicated rockets; six were launched on Scout-B rockets between 1966 and 1967. OV4 satellites were launched as part of a test flight for the Manned Orbiting Laboratory (MOL), with two satellites conducting a communications experiment whilst a third, OV4-3, was the primary payload, a boilerplate mockup of the MOL space station. Two further OV4 satellites, duplicates of the first two, were built but not launched. OV5 satellites were launched as secondary payloads on Titan IIIC rockets as part of the Environmental Research Satellite program.

The OV program was phased out in the late 1960s, succeeded by the Space Test Program, which focused on tailored satellites with specific payloads rather than standardized ones. The last of the series (an OV1) flew in 1971 (under the auspices of the new program).

== Program origin and operations ==
The Orbiting Vehicle satellite program arose from a US Air Force initiative, begun in the early 1960s, to reduce the expense of space research. Through this initiative, satellites would be standardized to improve reliability and cost-efficiency, and where possible, they would fly on test vehicles and/or piggybacked on other satellite launches. In 1961, the Air Force Office of Aerospace Research (OAR) created the Aerospace Research Support Program (ARSP) to request satellite research proposals and choose mission experiments. The USAF Space and Missiles Organization created their own analog of the ARSP called the Space Experiments Support Program (SESP), which sponsored a greater proportion of technological experiments than the ARSP.

In 1966, the OAR annual budget was only about US$10,000,000 (equivalent to $99,230,769 in 2025), which was notably low. This was partly possible due to the satellites being launched as secondary payloads on rocket test flights. Since these were necessarily of lower reliability than launches on seasons rockets, this meant the failure rate was higher: of the five OV missions launched in 1965, only one was successful. As each rocket launched to a unique orbit, failure to loft a satellite on a given launch meant the loss of data to be gained on that particular course. Experiments built for a certain flight, designed for their rocket's orbit, often had no back-up.

Experiments to be flown on the OV satellites (as well as the 100+ sounding rockets also flown under the auspices of OAR) were proposed by various laboratories in pursuit of their current research projects. These ranged in size from small black boxes to complete satellites. Each lab supported the building and testing of experiments as well as analysis of data returned from them. OAR prioritized the experiments on their scientific or engineering merit and also their feasibility; after picking the experiments, OAR then modified their choices based on funding available and managerial oversight. These final choices were passed by Air Force Headquarters and the Department of Defense—NASA was also consulted to ensure they were not launching flights to acquire the same data. OAR selected 22 experiments for satellite flights in 1966 and 30 for 1967.

Implementation of the OV program, as well as procurement of the launching rockets, was generally carried out by the Los Angeles OAR office, commanded by Lt. Col. John C. Hill, and sited at Air Force Space Systems Division (SSD) Headquarters in Los Angeles. Integration of the rocket and satellite was managed by SSD and the Air Force Ballistic Systems Division.

== Summary of Orbiting Vehicle programs ==
Five distinct OV series of standardized satellites were developed under the auspices of these agencies.

Series	Contractor	First launch	Last launch	Built	Launched	Failed to orbit
OV1	General Dynamics	1965-01-21	1971-08-07	23	23	4
OV2	Northrop	1965-10-15	1968-09-26	5	3	0
OV3	Space General; AFRCL	1967-04-22	1967-12-04	6	6	1
OV4	US Air Force; Martin Marietta	1966-11-03	1966-11-03	5	3	0
OV5	TRW Systems; AFRCL; Northrop	1967-04-28	1969-05-23	9	8	1

== OV1 ==
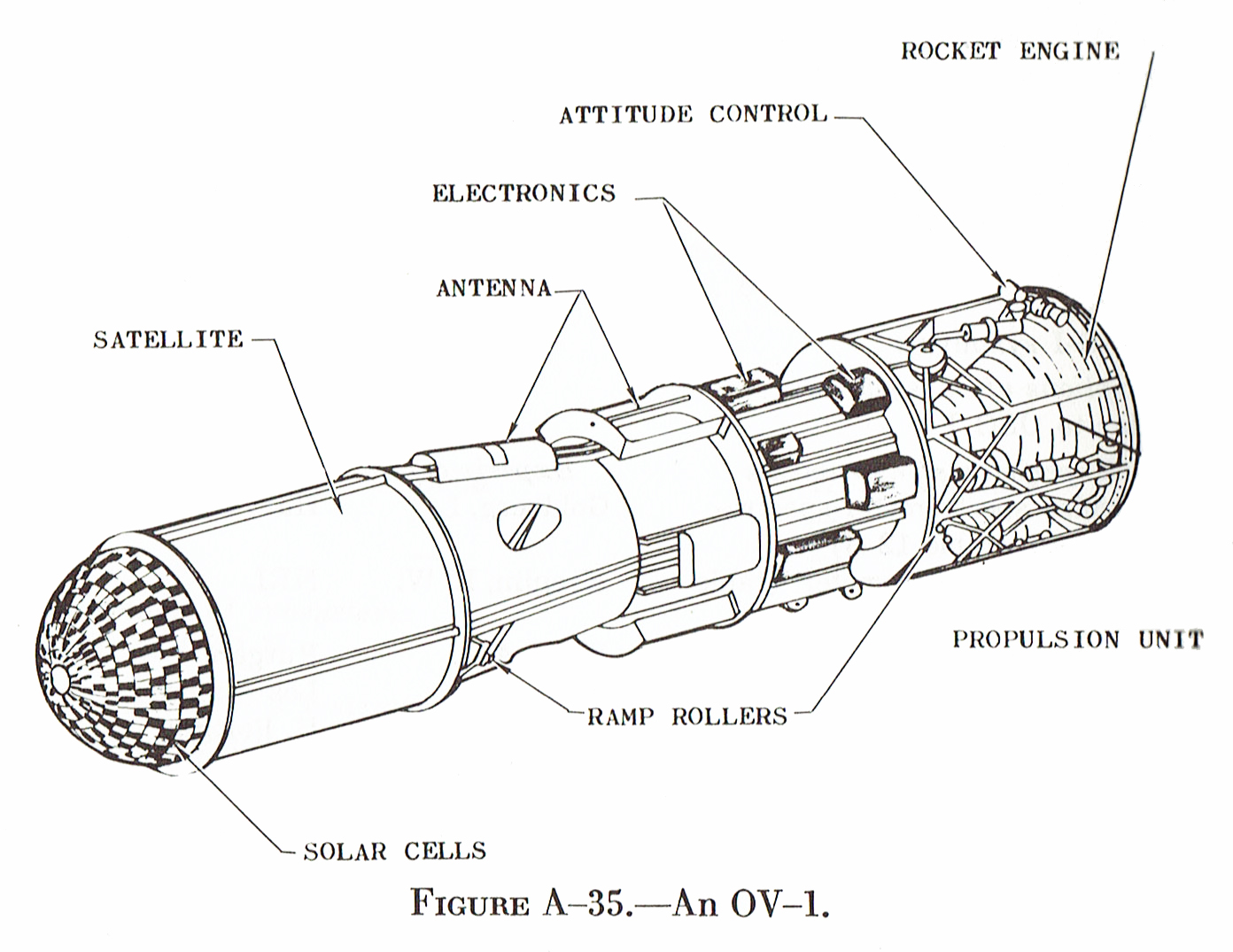
A typical OV1 satellite

=== Background ===
The OV1 series was an evolution of the 2.7 m "Scientific Passenger Pods" (SPP), which, starting on 2 October 1961, were affixed to suborbital Atlas missile tests and conducted scientific experiments during their short time in space. General Dynamics received a $2 million contract on 13 September 1963 to build a new version of the SPP (called the Atlas Retained Structure (ARS)) that would carry a self-orbiting satellite. Once the Atlas missile and ARS reached apogee, the satellite inside would be deployed and thrust itself into orbit. In addition to the orbital SPP, General Dynamics would create six of these satellites, each to be 3.66 m (12.0 ft) long with a diameter of .762 m (2 ft 6.0 in), able to carry a 136 kg (300 lb) payload into a circular 805 km (500 mi) orbit.

Dubbed "Satellite for Aerospace Research" (SATAR), the series of satellites was originally to be launched from the Eastern Test Range on Atlas missions testing experimental Advanced Ballistic Re-Entry System (ABRES) nosecones. However, in 1964, the Air Force transferred ABRES launches to the Western Test Range causing a year's delay for the program. Moreover, because WTR launches would be into polar orbit as opposed to the low-inclination orbits typical of ETR launches, less mass could be lofted into orbit using the same thrust, and the mass of the SATAR satellites had to be reduced.

After OV1-1, the last ABRES test launch, OV1-2 through 12 were launched on decommissioned Atlas D ICBMs, with the exception of OV1-6, launched via the Titan IIIC tasked for the Manned Orbiting Laboratory test flight. The OV1 series from OV1-13 onward were launched on decommissioned Atlas Fs.

=== Spacecraft ===
The standard OV1 satellite, 1.387 m (4 ft 6.6 in) long and .69 m (2 ft 3 in) in diameter, consisted of a cylindrical experiment housing capped with flattened cones on both ends containing 5000 solar cells producing 22 watts of power. Two .46 m (1 ft 6 in) antennae for transmitting telemetry and receiving commands extended from the sides of the spacecraft. 12 helium-pressurized hydrogen peroxide thrusters provided attitude control. Starting with OV1-7, the solar cells were flat rather than rounded, and the satellites carried the Vertistat attitude system that used a Sun sensor to determine the spacecraft's orientation to the Sun. OV1-13 and OV1-14 were the first in the OV1 series to use pulse-code modulation digital telemetry, which afforded the return of more and more precise data from the satellites.

=== Operations ===
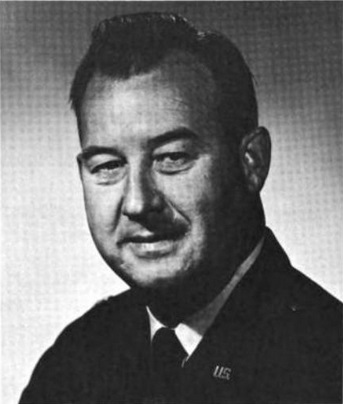
Lt. Col. Clyde Northcott, Jr., OV1 program manager

Ultimately, only the first of the SATARs, (OV1-1, called Atmospheric Research Vehicle (ARV) at the time) ever flew piggyback on an ABRES mission. The rest were flown on ex-ICBM Atlas D and F boosters specifically purchased by the OAR for the OV1 series (except OV1-6, which flew on the Manned Orbiting Laboratory test flight on 2 November 1966). The early Atlas D's were launched from "coffin" silos, and their aiming point was typically the island of Guam. The satellites were mounted in the nose cone of the launching rocket; OV1-1, OV1-3 and OV1-86 were side mounted. A jettisonable propulsion module with an Altair-2 solid-propellant motor provided the thrust for final orbital insertion.

The OV1/Atlas combination was economical for the time, costing just US$1,250,000 (equivalent to $12,403,846 in 2025) per launch. By flying as many as three satellite pods on a single rockets, payload costs were brought down significantly. The standardized format also afforded a quick experiment proposal-to-launch period of just fifteen months. The OV-1 program was managed by Lt. Col. Clyde Northcott, Jr.

=== Significant results ===
Data from OV1-4's Tissue Equivalent Ionization Chamber, calibrated against a similar instrument orbited on Gemini 4, determined the radiation dose Gemini astronauts traveling at OV1-4's altitude (~950 km (590 mi)) would receive: 4 rads per day at a 30° inclination orbit or 1.5 rads per day at a 90° (polar) inclination orbit.

In late May 1967, during a period of high solar and magnetic activity, OV1-9 returned the first evidence of Earth's long theorized but never measured electric field. The satellite detected a stream of protons flowing out of the atmosphere into space moving at more than 60,000 km (37,000 mi) per second. OV1-9 also studied the variation of proton fluxes in the outer Van Allen Belt during that same period, determining that fluxes were ten times greater four days after May's maximum solar activity than they had been before the flare; it took ten days for the fluxes to return to normal levels. The X-ray spectrometer on the co-launched OV1-10 returned the most comprehensive set of solar X-ray observations to date. These data enabled scientists to determine the relative density of neon to magnesium in the solar corona through direct observation rather than using complicated mathematical models. The ratio of neon to magnesium was found to be 1.47 to 1 (+/- .38).

OV1-13, launched 6 April 1968, measured increases in energy and intensity of electrons during a geomagnetic storm that took place 10 June 1968. OV1-13 data also clarified how the particle flow caused by solar storms created these high altitude increases.

Data returned by OV1s 15 and 16 returned the first substantial set of data on the density of Earth's atmosphere between the altitudes of 100 km (62 mi) and 200 km (120 mi) and proved that increased solar activity increased the air density at high altitudes, contradicting the prevailing model of the time. Moreover, the satellites determined that the density of the upper atmosphere was 10% lower than predicted by theoretical models. OV1-15/16 data led to improved atmospheric models that allowed the Air Force to better predict where and when satellites would decay and reenter.

From 1966-69, gravity-gradient stabilization was tested in low Earth orbit on several satellites of the United States Air Force's OV-1 series with a system called Vertistat. Consisting of three 15.5 m (51 ft)-long horizontal booms forming a 'y' and two 19 m (62 ft)-long vertical booms, Vertistat was used unsuccessfully on OV1-7, OV1-86, and OV1-17, but successfully on OV1-10.

=== OV1 Missions ===
Name	Mass	COSPAR ID	Launch	Reentry	Remarks
OV1-1	45 kg (99 lb), 86 kg (190 lb) with Altair booster		21 Jan 1965		Geophysics; first westward launch of a satellite; orbited, but on-board Altair failed to fire.
OV1-2	86 kg (190 lb) with Altair booster	1965 078A	5 Oct 1965		Radiation studies
OV1-3	92 kg (203 lb)		27 May 1965		Biomedical radiation studies; Atlas failed two minutes into flight.
OV1-4	87.6 kg (193 lb)	1966 025A	30 Mar 1966		Thermal control experiments
OV1-5	114.3 kg (252 lb)	1966 025B	30 Mar 1966		Optical radiation test
OV1-6	202 kg	1966 099C	3 Nov 1966	31 Dec 1966	Inflatable decoy
OV1-7	117 kg		14 Jul 1966	14 Jul 1966	Sky science; failed to orbit
OV1-8	3.2 kg	1966 063A	14 Jul 1966	4 Jan 1978	Passive comsat open aluminum sphere
OV1-9	104 kg	1966 111A	11 Dec 1966		Radiation studies; discovered Earth's electric field
OV1-10	130 kg	1966 111B	11 Dec 1966	30 Nov 2002	Radiation studies; studied solar X-rays and Earth's airglow
OV1-11	134 kg		27 July 1967	27 July 1967	Failed to orbit
OV1-12	140 kg	1966 072D	27 July 1967	22 Jul 1980	Radiation studies; also known as Flare Activated Radio-biological Observatory (Faro)
OV1-86	105 kg	1966 072A	27 July 1967	22 Feb 1972	Cosmic ray telescope; Earth's heat radiation
OV1-13	107 kg	1968 026A	6 Apr 1968		High altitude radiation studies
OV1-14	101 kg	1968 026B	6 Apr 1968		EM interference, radiation studies, and Lyman Alpha solar astronomy
OV1-15	213 kg	1968 059A	11 July 1968	6 Nov 1968	Air density, solar studies; also known as Solar Perturbation of Atmospheric Density Experiments Satellite (Spades)
OV1-16	272 kg	1968 059B	11 July 1968	19 Aug 1968	Ionospheric drag experiment; also known as Cannonball-1
OV1-17	142 kg	1969 025A	18 Mar 1969	5 Mar 1970	Solar studies
OV1-17A	221 kg	1969 025D	18 Mar 1969	24 Mar 1969	Repurposed propulsion module of OV1-17; ionospheric studies; also known as Orbis Cal-2
OV1-18		1969 025B	18 Mar 1969	27 Aug 1972	Ionospheric studies
OV1-19		1969 025C	18 Mar 1969		Radiation studies
OV1-20		1971 061A	7 Aug 1971	28 Aug 1971	Radar calibration, radiation studies; based on propulsion module
OV1-21		1971 061B	7 Aug 1971		Radar calibration, air density studies; based on propulsion module

== OV2 ==
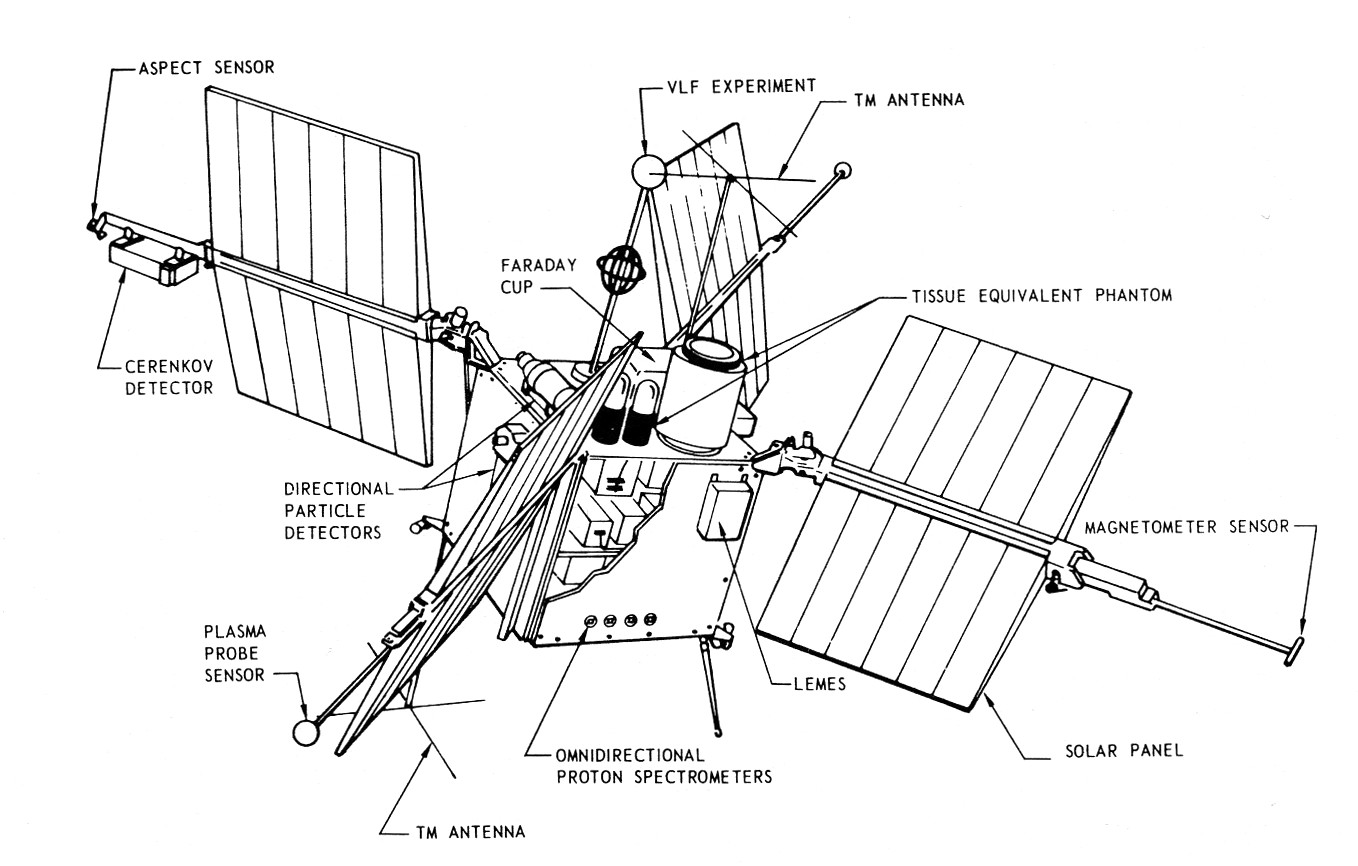
Diagram of OV2-1

=== Background ===
The OV2 series of satellites was originally designed as part of the ARENTS (Advanced Research Environmental Test Satellite) program, intended to obtain supporting data for the Vela satellites, which monitored the Earth for violations of the 1963 Partial Test Ban Treaty. Upon the cancellation of ARENTS due to delays in the Centaur rocket stage, the program's hardware (developed by General Dynamics) was repurposed to fly on the Titan III (initially the A, ultimately the C) booster test launches. The USAF contracted Northrop to produce these satellites, with William C. Armstrong of Northrop Space Laboratories serving as the program manager.

=== Spacecraft ===
The OV2 satellites were all designed on the same plan, roughly cubical structures of aluminum honeycomb, .61 m (2.0 ft) in height, and .58 m (1.9 ft) wide, with four 2.3 m (7.5 ft) paddle-like solar panels mounted at the four upper corners, each with 20,160 solar cells. The power system, which included NiCd batteries for night-time operations, provided 63 W of power. Experiments were generally mounted outside the cube while satellite systems, including tape recorder, command receiver, and PAM/FM/FM telemetry system, were installed inside. Four small solid rocket motors spun, one on each paddle, were designed to spin the OV2 satellites upon reaching orbit, providing gyroscopic stability. Cold-gas jets maintained this stability, receiving information on the satellite's alignment with respect to the Sun via an onboard solar aspect sensor, and with respect to the local magnetic field via two onboard fluxgate magnetometers. A damper kept the satellites from precessing (wobbling around its spin axis). Passive thermal control kept the satellites from overheating.

=== Operations ===
Three OV2 satellites with different mission objectives were originally planned when the OV2 program began. The OV2 series was ultimately expanded to five satellites, all with different goals. Only OV2-5, a radiation and astronomical satellite, achieved a degree of success. However, duplicates of experiments intended for OV2-1 did ultimately fly on OV3-3.

=== Significant results ===
OV2-5 proton energy data collected 2–13 October 1968 in the energy range of 0.060 to 3.3 Mev, showed an eight-fold reduction in particle flux between solar storms and quiet periods. Measuring the angle at which protons encountered the satellite also helped refine theoretical models of how the magnetosphere interacts with the flux of charged particles.

=== OV2 Missions ===
Name	Mass	COSPAR ID	Launch	Reentry	Remarks
OV2-1	170 kg (59 kg experimental payload)	1965 082A	15 Oct 1965	27 Jul 1972	Monitoring biological hazards of near Earth charged particles; failed to separate from LCS-2
OV2-2					Cancelled when the Titan-3C test program was changed; was to have conducted optical measurements from orbit.
OV2-3	193 kg	1965 108A	21 Dec 1965		Radiation studies; the payload failed to separate from the Transtage and contact was lost after launch.
OV2-4					Cancelled when the Titan-3C test program was changed; designed to observe radiation from trans-lunar orbit
OV2-5	204 kg	1968 081A	26 Sep 1968		Radiation studies: cosmic rays, trapped particle fluxes and changes in fluxes arising from solar and geomagnetic disturbances

== OV3 ==
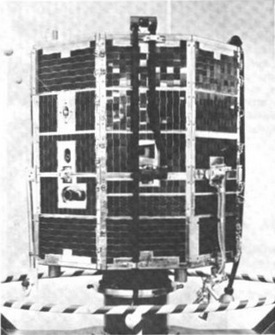
OV3-2

=== Background ===
Unlike the OV1 and OV2 series satellites, which were designed to use empty payload space on rocket test launches, the six OV3 satellites all had dedicated Scout boosters. In this regard, the OV3 series was more akin to its civilian science program counterparts (e.g. Explorer). OV3 differed from NASA programs in its heavy use of off-the-shelf equipment, which resulted in lower unit cost.

The first four satellites in the series were made the Aerojet subsidiary Space General Corporation under a $1.35m contract awarded 2 December 1964, the first satellite due October 1965. The last two satellites were built by Air Force Cambridge Research Laboratory (AFCRL), which also managed the entire series and provided four of the OV3 payloads.

Charles H. Reynolds, who worked at AFCRL from 1955, was the technical manager for the OV3 program.

=== Spacecraft ===
The OV3 satellites were octagonal prisms, .74 m (2 ft 5 in) in length and width (for OV3-5 and OV3-6, length was reduced to .53 m (1 ft 9 in)), with experiments mounted on booms. 2560 solar cells provided 30 Watts of power. The satellite was spin-stabilized, but because it was asymmetrical once its booms were extended, OV3-2 maintained its attitude in orbit with a precession damper. The spacecraft was spin stabilized at 8 revolutions per minute (rpm) A sun sensor, as well as an onboard tri-axial magnetnometer, gave information on the satellite's aspect (facing), its spin rate, and rate of precession. Design life-span was one year.

=== Operations ===
The OV3 program ultimately comprised 6 missions, five of them successful. The last (OV3-6) flew on 4 December 1967. The OV3 program was terminated following OV3-6 in favor of the cheaper OV1 program.

=== Significant Results ===
- OV3-1 had a near polar orbit and returned useful data on the energy and distribution of electrons in the auroral regions.
- Data returned by OV3-4 helped prove and refine theoretical models of radiation dosage an astronaut would receive at orbital altitudes.
- OV3-3 VLF receiver data determined the location of the plasmapause (the outer boundary of the Earth's inner magnetosphere).
- OV3-2 observed ambient charged particle variations before, during, and after the 12 November 1966 South American solar eclipse. OV3-2 also conducted ionospheric and aurora research in orbit in conjunction with AFCRL KC-135 aircraft flying underneath, conducting simultaneous measurements. The National Research Council of Canada also conducted coordinated, simultaneous ionospheric observations.
- OV3-6 measured much larger latitude variations than current atmospheric models had expected. A bulge in the neutral density in the summer hemisphere was also discovered. The data obtained was used to construct more accurate atmospheric models, and to correlate physical chemistry reactions to disturbances originating from the sun.

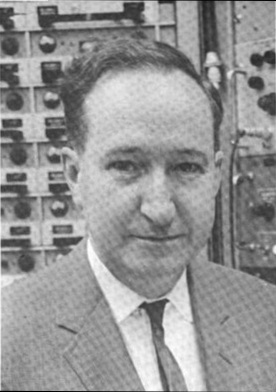
Charles H. Reynolds, Technical Manager of OV3

=== OV3 Missions ===
Name	Mass	COSPAR ID	Launch	Reentry	Remarks
OV3-1	68 kg	1966 034A	22 Apr 1966		Radiation studies; OPS-1527
OV3-2	81 kg	1966 097A	28 Oct 1966	29 Sep 1971	Radiation studies
OV3-3	75 kg	1966 070A	4 Aug 1966		Radiation studies (carried instruments originally on the failed OV2-1)
OV3-4	79 kg	1966 052A	10 Jun 1966		Radiation studies; also known as Personnel Hazards Associated with Space Radiation (Phasr) or Ops-1427
OV3-5	94 kg		31 Jan 1967		Ionospheric studies; also known as Atmospheric Composition Satellite (Atcos)-1; failed to orbit
OV3-6	202 kg	1967 120A	4 Dec 1967	9 Mar 1969	Ionospheric studies; also known as Atcos-2

== OV4 ==
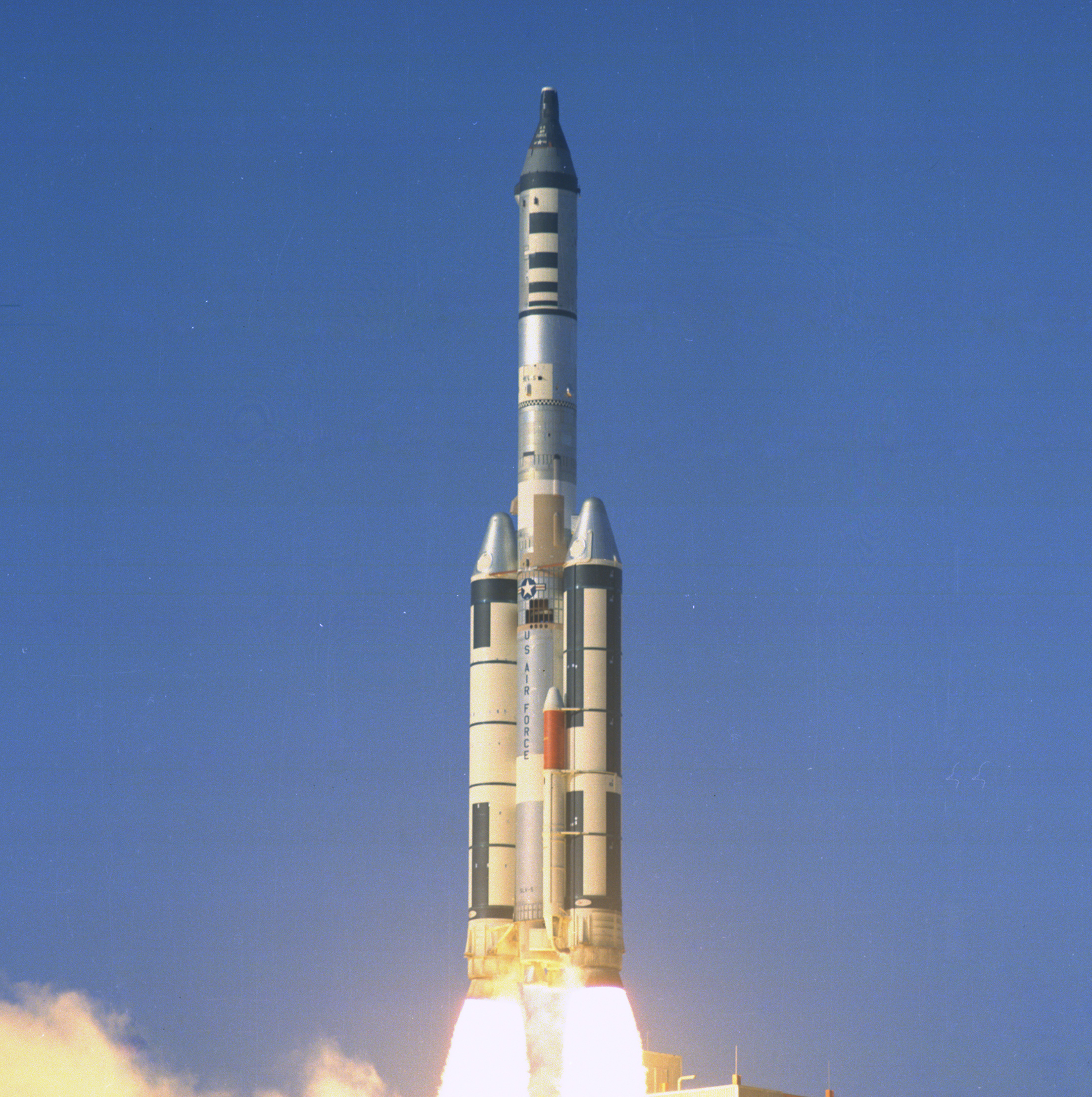
Launch of Titan IIIC with OV4 satellites

=== Background ===
The OV4 series was designed to utilize space aboard the Manned Orbiting Laboratory (MOL) test flights. In September 1964, Raytheon was awarded a $220,000 contract to build a one-off pair of satellites, designed by the U.S.A.F. Avionics Laboratory. These two satellites would investigate long range radio propagation in the charged atmosphere of the ionosphere analogous to the whispering gallery transmission of sounds under a physical dome. In this way, the OV4-1 pair would evaluate the ionosphere's F layer as method of facilitating HF and VHF transmissions between satellites not in line of sight of each other.

=== Spacecraft ===
The OV4-1 satellite pair consisted of a transmitting spacecraft and a receiving spacecraft. OV4-1T's transmitter broadcast on three frequencies in the 20-50 MHz range. OV4-1R included receiving equipment and telemetry broadcast equipment. Launched into slightly different 300 km (190 mi) orbits, the satellites would test whispering gallery communications over a range of distances; OV4-1T included a small rocket motor to maximize orbital separation (180°) from OV4-1R.

Both satellites were cylindrical, .43 m (1 ft 5 in) in diameter, with domed upper ends. Total length was .9 m (2 ft 11 in). Silver oxide/zinc batteries provided for a 50-day lifespan.

Two sets of OV4 "whispering gallery" satellites were built. OV4-2T and OV4-2R were never flown.

=== Operations ===
OV4-1T and OV4-1R were scheduled for launch on the MOL Heat Shield Qualification flight, with a Titan IIIC rocket. The dummy MOL (a Titan first-stage oxidizer tank) was equipped with a variety of experiments and dubbed OV4-3. OV1-6 was also mounted on the Titan III. The rocket took off from Cape Canaveral Launch Complex 40 on 3 November 1966 at 13:50:42 UTC.

=== OV4 Missions ===
Name	Mass	COSPAR ID	Launch	Reentry	Remarks
OV4-1R	68 kg	1966 099B	3 Nov 1966	5 Jan 1967	"Whispering Gallery" receiver
OV4-1T	109 kg	1966 099D	3-Nov-1966	11-Jan-1967	"Whispering Gallery" transmitter
OV4-2R					"Whispering Gallery" receiver (cancelled)
OV4-2T					"Whispering Gallery" transmitter (cancelled)
OV4-3	9661 kg	1966 099A	3-Nov-1966	9-Jan-1967	Boiler plate model of the Manned Orbiting Laboratory (MOL) to which the reconditioned Gemini 2 (which had been used on a sub-orbital flight on 19 January 1965) was attached; included several experiments; also known as Ops-0855

== OV5 ==
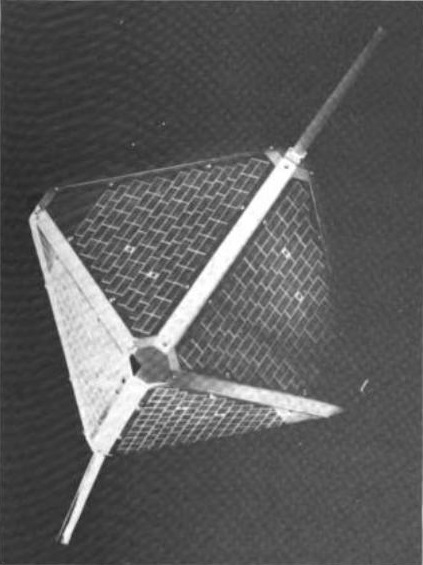
OV5-1 satellite

=== Background ===
The OV5 program was a continuation of the Environmental Research Satellite (ERS) series developed by Space Technology Laboratories, a subdivision of TRW Inc. These were very small satellites launched pick-a-back with primary payloads since 1962—a natural fit under the Orbiting Vehicle umbrella. The primary innovation over the earlier ERS series was a command receiver, allowing instructions to be sent from the ground, and a Pulse-code modulation digital telemetry system, versus the analog transmitters used on prior ERS missions. Like prior ERS, the OV5s were spin-stabilized and heat was passively controlled. All of the OV5 series were built by TRW with the exception of OV5-6, built by AFCRL, and OV5-9, built by Northrop Corporation.

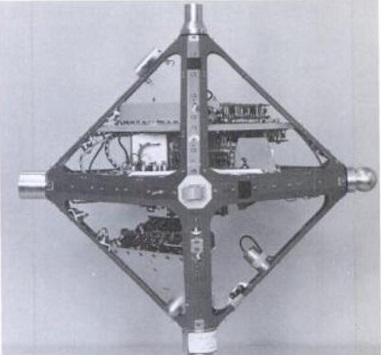
OV5-1 satellite with solar cells removed

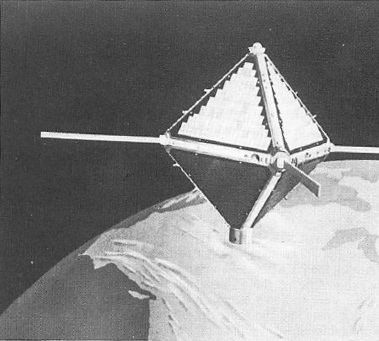
Artist's conception of OV5-4 in orbit

=== OV5 Missions ===
Name	Mass	COSPAR ID	Launch	Reentry	Remarks
OV5-1	6 kg	1967 040E	28 Apr 1967		Radiation studies; also known as ERS-27
OV5-2	10 kg	1968 081B	26 Sep 1968	15 Feb 1971	Materials sciences research; also known as ERS-28
OV5-3	8.6 kg	1967 040D	28 Apr 1967		Materials sciences research – materials friction experiment; also known as ERS-20
OV5-4	12 kg	1968 081C	26 Sep 1968		Heat transfer studies; also known as ERS-21
OV5-5	11 kg	1969 046A	23-May-1969		Radiation studies; also known as ERS-29
OV5-6	11 kg	1969 046B	23-May-1969		Solar flare studies; also known as ERS-26
OV5-7					Solar studies; cancelled
OV5-8	9 kg		16 Aug 1968		Materials sciences research – materials friction experiment; failed to orbit
OV5-9	13 kg	1969 046C	23 May 1969		Radiation studies – carried low-energy proton detectors, a dE/dx telescope, a Cerenkov counter, a VLF radiation detector, a solar X-ray monitor and a solar flare electron detector to provide further basic research data on solar radiation and its effects on the magnetosphere

== Program conclusion ==
The OV program orbited 184 experiments at extremely low launch costs and with very short proposal-to-orbit times. OV was succeeded by the Space Test Program, managed by the Space Missile Organization's Space Experiments Support Program, which had absorbed the ARSP in 1968. The Space Test Program followed the new trend in satellites, which preferred custom-built one-offs with specific payloads to vehicles built on standardized plans. Several late OV satellites were launched under the auspices of the new program
