= OV1-9 =

US Air Force satellite

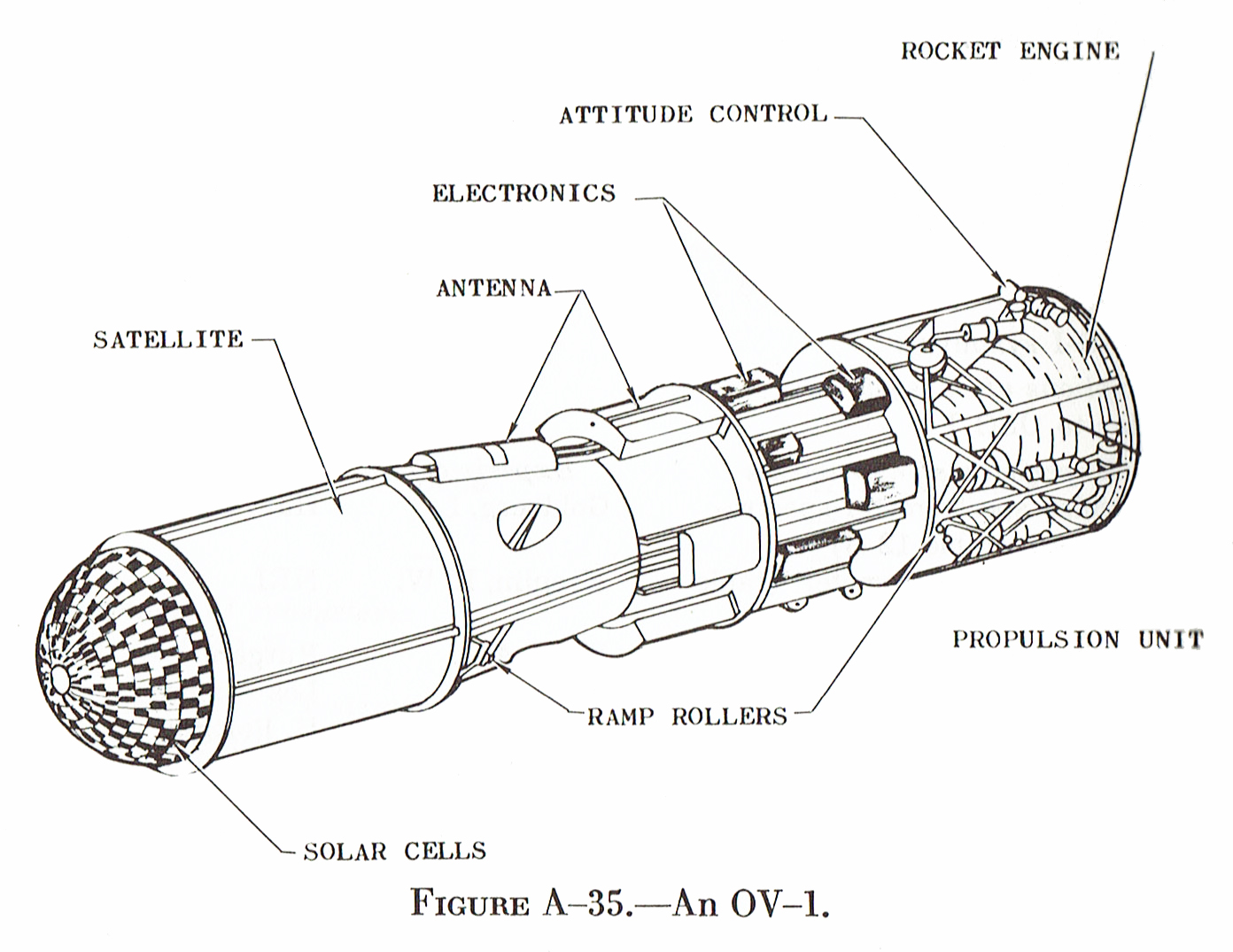
- OV1 series satellite
- Mission type: Earth science
- Operator: USAF
- COSPAR ID: 1966-111A
- SATCAT no.: S02610

Spacecraft properties
- Manufacturer: General Dynamics
- Launch mass: 104 kg (229 lb) with Altair

Start of mission
- Launch date: 11 Dec 1966 21:09:57 UTC
- Rocket: Atlas D
- Launch site: Vandenberg 576-B-3

Orbital parameters
- Regime: Low Earth Orbit
- Eccentricity: 0.23544
- Perigee altitude: 472.00 km (293.29 mi)
- Apogee altitude: 4,694.00 km (2,916.72 mi)
- Inclination: 99.10°
- Period: 141.00 minutes
- Epoch: 1966-12-11 21:07:00

Orbiting Vehicle 1-9 (also known as OV1-9), launched 11 December 1966 along with OV1-10, was the ninth (sixth successful) satellite in the OV1 series of the United States Air Force's Orbiting Vehicle program. OV1-9 recorded low frequency radio emissions and particle radiation in Earth's exosphere; the satellite also collected data on the impact of long-term radiation on biological samples and tissue equivalents. OV1-9 returned the first proof that Earth has an electric field.

== History ==
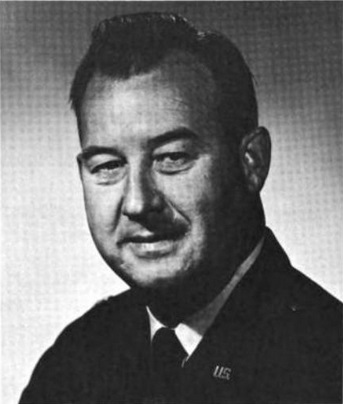
Lt. Col. Clyde Northcott, Jr., OV1 program manager

The Orbiting Vehicle satellite program arose from a US Air Force initiative, begun in the early 1960s, to reduce the expense of space research. Through this initiative, satellites would be standardized to improve reliability and cost-efficiency, and where possible, they would fly on test vehicles or be piggybacked with other satellites. In 1961, the Air Force Office of Aerospace Research (OAR) created the Aerospace Research Support Program (ARSP) to request satellite research proposals and choose mission experiments. The USAF Space and Missiles Organization created their own analog of the ARSP called the Space Experiments Support Program (SESP), which sponsored a greater proportion of technological experiments than the ARSP. Five distinct OV series of standardized satellites were developed under the auspices of these agencies.

The OV1 series was an evolution of the 2.7 m "Scientific Passenger Pods" (SPP), which, starting on 2 October 1961, rode piggyback on suborbital Atlas missile tests and conducted scientific experiments during their short time in space. General Dynamics received a $2 million contract on 13 September 1963 to build a new version of the SPP (called the Atlas Retained Structure (ARS)) that would carry a self-orbiting satellite. Once the Atlas missile and ARS reached apogee, the satellite inside would be deployed and thrust itself into orbit. In addition to the orbital SPP, General Dynamics would create six of these satellites, each to be 3.66 m (12.0 ft) long with a diameter of .762 m (2 ft 6.0 in), able to carry a 136 kg (300 lb) payload into a circular 805 km (500 mi) orbit.

Dubbed "Satellite for Aerospace Research" (SATAR), the series of satellites was originally to be launched from the Eastern Test Range on Atlas missions testing experimental Advanced Ballistic Re-Entry System (ABRES) nosecones. However, in 1964, the Air Force transferred ABRES launches to the Western Test Range causing a year's delay for the program. Moreover, because WTR launches would be into polar orbit as opposed to the low-inclination orbits typical of ETR launches, less mass could be lofted into orbit using the same thrust, and the mass of the SATAR satellites had to be reduced. The OV1 program was managed by Lt. Col. Clyde Northcott, Jr.

Prior to the dual launch of OV1-9 and OV1-10, there had been eight satellites in the OV1 series, the first launched January 21, 1965. All launches had been on Atlas missiles except for OV1-6, which was programmed for launch out of sequence (after the 14 July 1966 launch of OV1-7 and OV1-8) so that it could be carried on the Titan IIIC tasked for the Manned Orbiting Laboratory test flight.

== Spacecraft design ==
OV1-9 was, like the rest of the OV1 satellite series, 1.387 m (4 ft 6.6 in) long and .69 m (2 ft 3 in) in diameter, consisting of a cylindrical experiment housing capped with flattened cones on both ends. It included 5000 flat-faceted solar cells producing 22 watts of power. Two .46 m (1 ft 6 in) antennas for transmitting telemetry and receiving commands extended from the sides of the spacecraft. 12 helium-pressurized hydrogen peroxide thrusters provided attitude control.

OV1-9 weighed, with its attached Altair booster, 104 kg (229 lb).

== Experiments ==
OV1-9's experiment package included experiments developed by the US Air Force's Cambridge Research Laboratories (AFCRL) to detect emissions of exospheric and non-terrestrial origin as well as a battery of spectrometers and counters for detecting ionizing radiation of energy levels from 1 to 100 KeV. The satellite also carried a "Linear Energy Transfer" (LET) device and a tissue-equivalent ion chamber to determine the long term penetrative ability and dosage of radiation on living creatures in orbit.

As an engineering experiment, OV1-9 carried a new system that determined the satellite's orbital attitude using a solar sensor.

== Mission ==
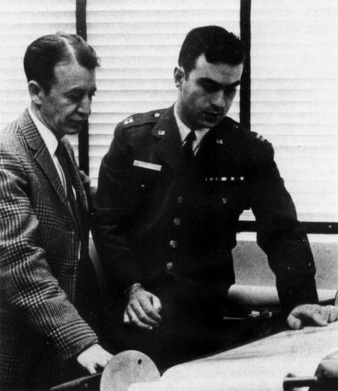
AFCRL's Ludwig Katz and Capt. Paul Rothwell examine OV1-9 data

Launched from Vandenberg's 576-B-3 launch pad on 11 Dec 1966 at 21:09:57 UTC via Atlas D rocket, OV1-9 and the co-launched OV1-10 were the first satellites in the OV1 series to be launched into nearly polar orbits as opposed to 144° retrograde orbits.

In late May 1967, during a period of high solar and magnetic activity, OV1-9 returned the first evidence of Earth's long theorized but never measured electric field. The satellite detected a stream of protons flowing out of the atmosphere into space moving at more than 60,000 km (37,000 mi) per second. This discovery was reported by two AFCRL scientists, Ludwig Katz and Captain Paul Rothwell. OV1-9 also studied the variation of proton fluxes in the outer Van Allen Belt during that same period, determining that fluxes were ten times greater four days after May's maximum solar activity than they had been before the flare; it took ten days for the fluxes to return to normal levels.

== Legacy and status ==
The OV1 program ultimately comprised 22 missions, the last flying on 19 September 1971. As of 26 December 2021, OV1-9 is still in orbit, and its position can be tracked on-line.
