= OV1-10 =

US Air Force satellite

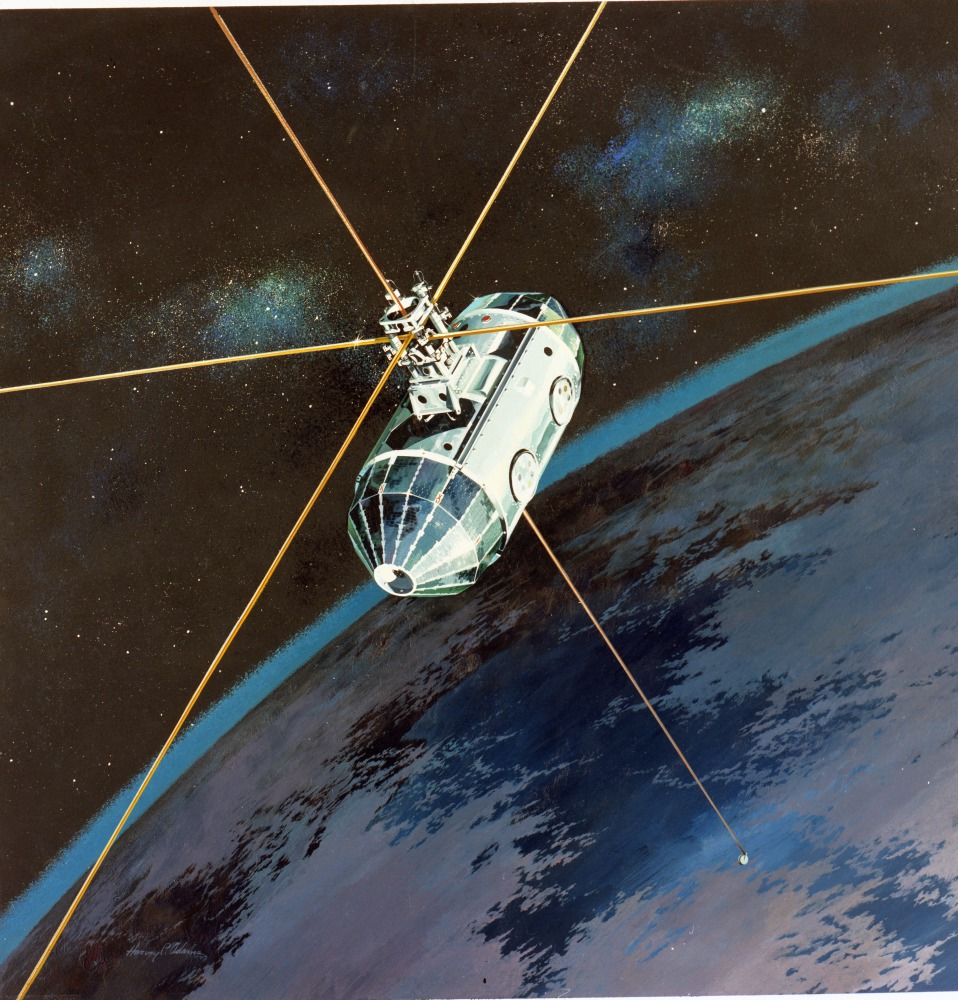
- Artist's impression of OV1-10 satellite
- Mission type: Earth science
- Operator: USAF
- COSPAR ID: 1966-111B
- SATCAT no.: S02611

Spacecraft properties
- Manufacturer: General Dynamics
- Launch mass: 130 kg (290 lb) with Altair

Start of mission
- Launch date: 11 Dec 1966 21:09:57 UTC
- Rocket: Atlas D
- Launch site: Vandenberg 576-B-3

End of mission
- Decay date: 30 November 2002

Orbital parameters
- Regime: Low Earth Orbit
- Eccentricity: 0.00903
- Perigee altitude: 641.00 km (398.30 mi)
- Apogee altitude: 769.00 km (477.83 mi)
- Inclination: 93.430°
- Period: 98.87 minutes
- Epoch: 11 Dec 1966 21:07:00

Orbiting Vehicle 1-10 (also known as OV1-10), launched 11 December 1966 along with OV1-9, was the tenth (seventh successful) satellite in the OV1 series of the United States Air Force's Orbiting Vehicle program. Designed to observe atmospheric airglow, X-ray and cosmic radiation, OV1-10 returned significant data on the Sun as well as on geophysical phenomena in Earth's magnetic field. OV1-10 reentered Earth's atmosphere on 30 November 2002.

== History ==
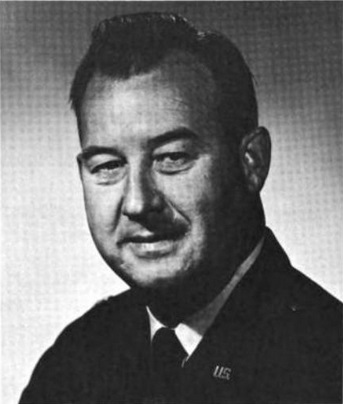
Lt. Col. Clyde Northcott, Jr., OV1 program manager

The Orbiting Vehicle satellite program arose from a US Air Force initiative, begun in the early 1960s, to reduce the expense of space research. Through this initiative, satellites would be standardized to improve reliability and cost-efficiency, and where possible, they would fly on test vehicles or be piggybacked with other satellites. In 1961, the Air Force Office of Aerospace Research (OAR) created the Aerospace Research Support Program (ARSP) to request satellite research proposals and choose mission experiments. The USAF Space and Missiles Organization created their own analog of the ARSP called the Space Experiments Support Program (SESP), which sponsored a greater proportion of technological experiments than the ARSP. Five distinct OV series of standardized satellites were developed under the auspices of these agencies.

The OV1 series was an evolution of the 2.7 m "Scientific Passenger Pods" (SPP), which, starting on 2 October 1961, rode piggyback on suborbital Atlas missile tests and conducted scientific experiments during their short time in space. General Dynamics received a $2 million contract on 13 September 1963 to build a new version of the SPP (called the Atlas Retained Structure (ARS)) that would carry a self-orbiting satellite. Once the Atlas missile and ARS reached apogee, the satellite inside would be deployed and thrust itself into orbit. In addition to the orbital SPP, General Dynamics would create six of these satellites, each to be 3.66 m (12.0 ft) long with a diameter of .762 m (2 ft 6.0 in), able to carry a 136 kg (300 lb) payload into a circular 805 km (500 mi) orbit.

Dubbed "Satellite for Aerospace Research" (SATAR), the series of satellites was originally to be launched from the Eastern Test Range on Atlas missions testing experimental Advanced Ballistic Re-Entry System (ABRES) nosecones. However, in 1964, the Air Force transferred ABRES launches to the Western Test Range causing a year's delay for the program. Moreover, because WTR launches would be into polar orbit as opposed to the low-inclination orbits typical of ETR launches, less mass could be lofted into orbit using the same thrust, and the mass of the SATAR satellites had to be reduced. The OV1 program was managed by Lt. Col. Clyde Northcott, Jr.

Prior to the dual launch of OV1-9 and OV1-10, there had been eight satellites in the OV1 series, the first launched January 21, 1965. All launches had been on Atlas missiles except for OV1-6, which was programmed for launch out of sequence (after the 14 July 1966 launch of OV1-7 and OV1-8) so that it could be carried on the Titan IIIC tasked for the Manned Orbiting Laboratory test flight.

== Spacecraft design ==
OV1-10 was, like the rest of the OV1 satellite series, 1.387 m (4 ft 6.6 in) long and .69 m (2 ft 3 in) in diameter, consisting of a cylindrical experiment housing capped with flattened cones on both ends. It included 5000 flat-faceted solar cells producing 22 watts of power. Two .46 m (1 ft 6 in) antennas for transmitting telemetry and receiving commands extended from the sides of the spacecraft. 12 helium-pressurized hydrogen peroxide thrusters provided attitude control. OV1-10 used 6 distinctive extendible booms with masses at the ends for gravity-gradient stabilization, two extending in opposite directions for each of yaw, pitch and roll. The longer yaw axis booms, each measuring 50 ft (15 m), were also used to house experiments. The spacecraft was not able to achieve yaw stability, turning 180 degrees upside down on several occasions.

OV1-10 weighed, with its attached Altair booster, 130 kg (290 lb).

== Experiments ==
The OV1-10 science package comprised eight experiments. A number of photometers and a Geiger–Müller tube detected day and nighttime atmospheric airglow. OV1-10 carried a cosmic ray telescope and a Sun-pointed X-ray spectrometer for the evaluation of non-terrestrial radiation, complementing OV1-9's experiment package, which was focused on the long term measurement of orbital radiation and its threat to living organisms. Two NASA experiments, a magnetometer and an electric field measuring voltmeter housed in two 15.24 m (50.0 ft) booms used for gravity-gradient stabilization, completed the experiment package.

== Mission ==
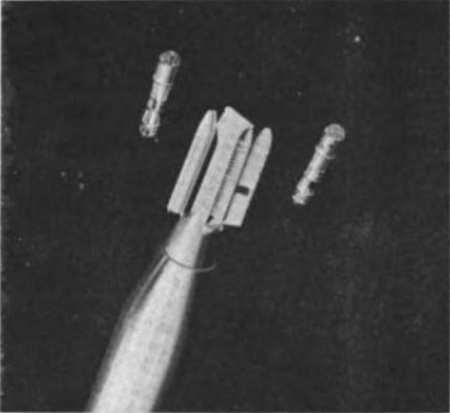
OV1 dual launch staging

Launched from Vandenberg's 576-B-3 launch pad on 11 Dec 1966 at 21:09:57 UTC via Atlas D rocket, OV1-10 and the co-launched OV1-9 were the first satellites in the OV1 series to be launched into nearly polar orbits as opposed to 144° retrograde orbits. The satellite's track, nearly perpendicular to the equator, meant that it followed a meridian of nearly constant local time, drifting with respect to the ground about one hour per month. The "Vertistat" stabilization system, first installed on the failed OV1-7, did not consistently work to keep the satellite stably oriented. OV1-10 sometimes flipped upside-down, and it was given to occasional rapid yaw (spinning around its center of mass) motions. This data was useful in illustrating ways to improve future gravity-gradient systems.

OV1-10's X-ray spectrometer returned the most comprehensive set of solar X-ray observations to date. These data were enabled scientists to determine the relative density of neon to magnesium in the solar corona through direct observation rather than using complicated mathematical models. The ratio of neon to magnesium was found to be 1.47 to 1 (+/- .38). OV1-10's airglow experiments also returned observations of Stable Auroral Red (SAR) arcs, which occur during geomagnetic storms, during an event that took place 15–17 February 1967.

== Legacy and status ==
OV1-10 reentered Earth's atmosphere on 30 November 2002. The OV1 program ultimately comprised 22 missions, the last flying on 19 September 1971. As of 26 December 2021, OV1-9 is still in orbit, and its position can be tracked on-line.
