= OV3-2 =

US Air Force satellite

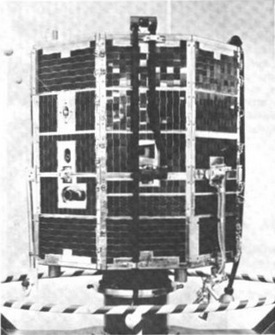
- OV3-2
- Mission type: Earth science
- Operator: USAF
- COSPAR ID: 1966-097A
- SATCAT no.: S02517

Spacecraft properties
- Manufacturer: Space General
- Launch mass: 81 kg (179 lb)

Start of mission
- Launch date: 28 October 1966 11:56:02 UTC
- Rocket: Scout B
- Launch site: Vandenberg Space Launch Complex 5

End of mission
- Decay date: 29 September 1971

Orbital parameters
- Regime: Medium Earth Orbit
- Eccentricity: 0.08697
- Perigee altitude: 320.00 km (198.84 mi)
- Apogee altitude: 1,597.00 km (992.33 mi)
- Inclination: 82.000°
- Period: 104.20 minutes
- Epoch: 28 October 1966 12:00:00

Orbiting Vehicle 3-2 (also known as OV3-2), launched 28 October 1966, was the fourth satellite to be launched in the OV3 series of the United States Air Force's Orbiting Vehicle program. The satellite measured charged particles in orbit, mapping irregularities in the ionosphere, particularly the auroral zone. OV3-2 reentered the Earth's atmosphere on 29 September 1971.

== History ==
The Orbiting Vehicle satellite program arose from a US Air Force initiative, begun in the early 1960s, to reduce the expense of space research. Through this initiative, satellites would be standardized to improve reliability and cost-efficiency, and where possible, they would fly on test vehicles or be piggybacked with other satellites. In 1961, the Air Force Office of Aerospace Research (OAR) created the Aerospace Research Support Program (ARSP) to request satellite research proposals and choose mission experiments. The USAF Space and Missiles Organization created their own analog of the ARSP called the Space Experiments Support Program (SESP), which sponsored a greater proportion of technological experiments than the ARSP. Five distinct OV series of standardized satellites were developed under the auspices of these agencies.

Unlike the previously initiated OV1 and OV2 series of satellites, which were designed to use empty payload space on rocket test launches, the six OV3 satellites all had dedicated Scout boosters. In this regard, the OV3 series was more akin to its civilian science program counterparts (e.g. Explorer). OV3 differed from NASA programs in its heavy use of off-the-shelf equipment, which resulted in lower unit cost.

The first four satellites in the series were made the Aerojet subsidiary Space General Corporation under a $1.35m contract awarded 2 December 1964, the first satellite due October 1965. The last two satellites were built by Air Force Cambridge Research Laboratory (AFCRL), which also managed the entire series and provided four of the OV3 payloads.

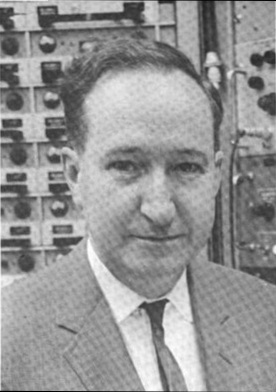
Charles H. Reynolds, Technical Manager of OV3

Charles H. Reynolds, who worked at AFCRL from 1955, was the technical manager for the OV3 program.

Prior to the launch of OV3-2, three other OV3 satellites had been placed into orbit, all radiation measuring spacecraft launched in 1966.

== Spacecraft design ==
Like the rest of the OV3 satellites, OV3-2 was an octagonal prism, .74 m (2 ft 5 in) in length and width, with experiments mounted on booms. 2560 solar cells provided 30 Watts of power. The satellite was spin-stabilized, but because it was asymmetrical once its booms were extended, OV3-2 maintained its attitude in orbit with a precession damper. The spacecraft was spin stabilized at eight revolutions per minute (rpm) A Sun sensor, as well as an onboard tri-axial magnetnometer, gave information on the satellite's aspect (facing), its spin rate, and rate of precession.

OV3-2 massed 81 kg (179 lb) Its design life-span was one year.

== Experiments ==
OV3-2 carried five AFCRL experiments designed primarily to investigate low-energy particles in the Van Allen Belts, looking for irregularities in the ionosphere, particularly in the auroral zone. In addition to its magnetometer, the spacecraft carried two retarding-potential analyzers (RPA) orthogonally mounted on one 54 in (140 cm) boom and a mass spectrometer, both to detect heavy ions; a pair of electrostatic analyzers to measure electrons in the 15-80 keV range; and two Langmuir probes on separate 54 in (140 cm) booms to measure electron density in the 0-2 keV range. The satellite also carried two standing-wave impedance probes on 30 ft (9.1 m) extendable dipoles generating at 2 and 7 Mhz.

Joseph H. Geary was the payload manager for OV3-2.

== Mission ==
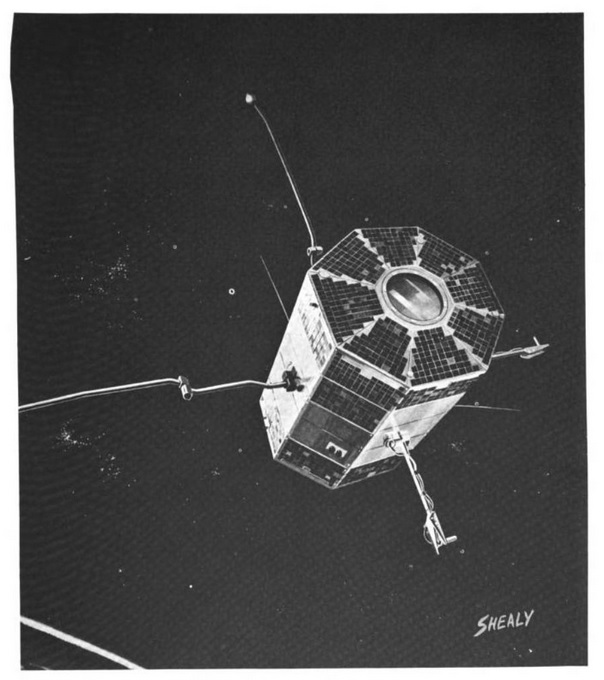
Artist's rendition of the OV3-2 satellite in orbit.

Launched from Vandenberg Space Launch Complex 5 on 28 October 1966 at 11:56:02 UTC via Scout B rocket into a polar orbit, OV3-2 was the fourth satellite to be launched in the OV3 series. While OV3-2 conducted ionospheric and aurora research in orbit in conjunction with AFCRL KC-135 aircraft flying underneath. The National Research Council of Canada also conducted coordinated, simultaneous ionospheric observations. OV3-2's launch was timed such that it could observe ambient charged particle variations before, during, and after the 12 November 1966 South American solar eclipse.

As a result of the erratic performance of the command system, tape recorded data was not obtained until orbit 58 (four days after launch). In 1967, the tape recorder failed, and an additional command system at Churchill, Manitoba was set up to obtain real-time data. This data had to be manually reduced for interpretation because of a malfunction of OV3-2's onboard clock. Some RPA data was lost due to the failure of the thermal equalization probe. The satellite operated throughout 1967, returning high quality data.

The satellite was tracked from the ground from January 1967 to March 1969, a period of rising solar activity, to determine atmospheric densities at heights of 275 km (171 mi) and 320 km (200 mi). The deduced values were compared to those returned by Explorer 32, also in orbit at the time. Good data were obtained.

OV3-2 reentered the Earth's atmosphere on 29 September 1971.

== Legacy ==
The OV3 program ultimately comprised 6 missions, five of them successful. The last (OV3-6) flew on 4 December 1967. The OV3 program was terminated following OV3-6 in favor of the cheaper OV1 program.
