= OV3-1 =

US Air Force satellite

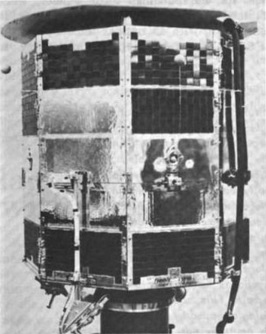
- OV3-1
- Mission type: Earth science
- Operator: USAF
- COSPAR ID: 1966-034
- SATCAT no.: S02150

Spacecraft properties
- Manufacturer: Space General
- Launch mass: 69 kg (152 lb)

Start of mission
- Launch date: 22 Apr 1966 09:45:00 UTC
- Rocket: Scout B
- Launch site: Vandenberg PALC-D

Orbital parameters
- Regime: Medium Earth Orbit
- Eccentricity: 0.24301
- Perigee altitude: 341.00 km (211.89 mi)
- Apogee altitude: 4,658.00 km (2,894.35 mi)
- Inclination: 82.400°
- Period: 138.70 minutes
- Epoch: 22 Apr 1966 09:50:00

Orbiting Vehicle 3-1 (also known as OV3-1 and OPS 1527 ), launched 22 April 1966, was the first satellite in the OV3 series of the United States Air Force's Orbiting Vehicle program. The satellite measured radiation above the Earth, returning useful data for over a year. It is still in orbit as of 1 April 2021.

== History ==
The Orbiting Vehicle satellite program arose from a US Air Force initiative, begun in the early 1960s, to reduce the expense of space research. Through this initiative, satellites would be standardized to improve reliability and cost-efficiency, and where possible, they would fly on test vehicles or be piggybacked with other satellites. In 1961, the Air Force Office of Aerospace Research (OAR) created the Aerospace Research Support Program (ARSP) to request satellite research proposals and choose mission experiments. The USAF Space and Missiles Organization created their own analog of the ARSP called the Space Experiments Support Program (SESP), which sponsored a greater proportion of technological experiments than the ARSP. Five distinct OV series of standardized satellites were developed under the auspices of these agencies.

Unlike the previously initiated OV1 and OV2 series of satellites, which were designed to use empty payload space on rocket test launches, the six OV3 satellites all had dedicated Scout boosters. In this regard, the OV3 series was more akin to its civilian science program counterparts (e.g. Explorer). OV3 differed from NASA programs in its heavy use of off-the-shelf equipment, which resulted in lower unit cost.

The first four satellites in the series were made the Aerojet subsidiary Space General Corporation under a $1.35m contract awarded 2 December 1964, the first satellite due October 1965. The last two satellites were built by Air Force Cambridge Research Laboratory (AFCRL), which also managed the entire series and provided four of the OV3 payloads.

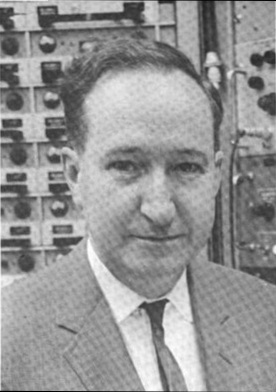
Charles H. Reynolds, Technical Manager of OV3

Charles H. Reynolds, who worked at AFCRL from 1955, was the technical manager for the OV3 program. AFCRL scientists Don F. Smart and Rita C. Sagalyn managed the satellite project.

== Spacecraft design ==
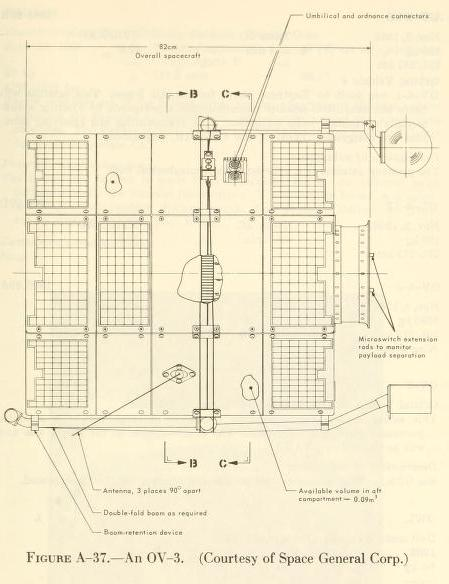
OV3 satellite schematic

Like the rest of the OV3 satellites, OV3-1 was an octagonal prism, .74 m (2 ft 5 in) in length and width, with experiments mounted on booms. 2560 solar cells provided 30 Watts of power. Designed for a six month mission, the satellite was spin-stabilized, but because it was asymmetrical once its four booms were extended, OV3-1 maintained its attitude in orbit with a precession damper. A Sun sensor, as well as an onboard tri-axial magnetnometer, gave information on the satellite's aspect (facing), its spin rate, and rate of precession.

OV3-1 massed 69 kilograms (152 lb) Its design life-span was one year.

== Experiments ==
OV3-1 carried six AFCRL experiments that had been flown on the unsuccessful 15 October 1965 OV2-1 mission, designed to evaluate the long-term hazards of the Earth's Van Allen Belts to astronauts and satellites. They included two pairs of electrostatic analyzers, two plasma probes, a Geiger counter, a scintillation spectrometer. This "cosmic radiation" package could measure the angular distribution and energies of atomic particles as well as their interaction with local magnetic fields. OV3-1 also carried two magnetometers to verify the direction the satellite's instruments were facing at any given time.

== Mission ==
OV3-1 was delivered by Space-General to the Air Force in March 1966. Launched from Vandenberg PALC-D on 22 April 1966 at 9:45:00 UTC via Scout B rocket, OV3-1 was the first in the OV3 satellite series. Though it was only designed to last for 6 months, OV3-1 was still operating more than two years after launch, and by early 1967, sufficient regular results had been obtained. The experiments were henceforth only activated once a week, although activation was made as frequently as possible (range-scheduling capability permitting) during periods of high solar activity.

Though OV3-1 returned good data, the satellite did not perform perfectly. The two magnetometer-mounted booms may not have fully deployed, and the aluminum foil wrapping on them changed the scale factors of the magnetometers, decreasing their sensitivity, each to a different degree. As a result, the magnetic aspect could not be precisely determined. Nevertheless, thanks to the satellite's near polar orbit, OV3-1 was able to return useful data on the energy and distribution of electrons in the auroral regions.

== Legacy and status ==
As of 1 April 2021, OV3-1 is still in orbit, and its position can be tracked on-line.

The OV3 program ultimately comprised 6 missions, five of them successful. The last (OV3-6) flew on 4 December 1967. The OV3-3 program was terminated following OV3 in favor of the cheaper OV1 program.
