= OV1-14 =

US Air Force satellite

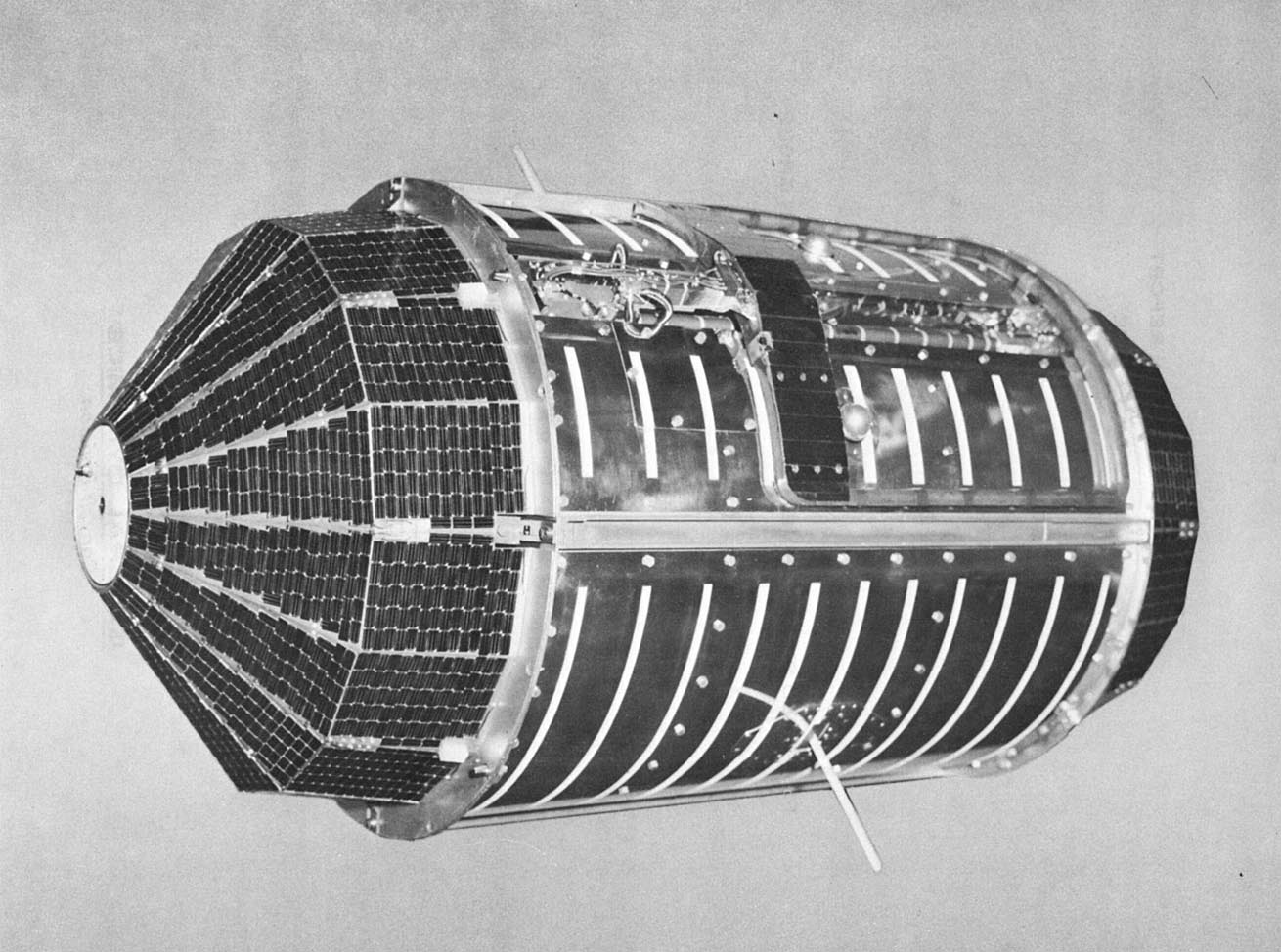
- OV1-14
- Mission type: Earth science
- Operator: USAF
- COSPAR ID: 1968-026B
- SATCAT no.: S03174

Spacecraft properties
- Manufacturer: General Dynamics
- Launch mass: 101 kg (223 lb)

Start of mission
- Launch date: 6 April 1968 09:59:42 UTC
- Rocket: Atlas F
- Launch site: Vandenberg 576-A-2

End of mission
- Last contact: 10 April 1968

Orbital parameters
- Regime: Low Earth Orbit
- Eccentricity: 0.40145
- Perigee altitude: 565.00 km (351.07 mi)
- Apogee altitude: 9,885.00 km (6,142.25 mi)
- Inclination: 100.1°
- Period: 207.40 minutes
- Epoch: 6 April 1968 10:04:00 UTC

Orbiting Vehicle 1–14 (also known as OV1-14) was a satellite launched 6 April 1968 to measure electromagnetic interference and measure proton and electron flux at altitudes up to 8,000 km (5,000 mi). OV1-14 was also supposed to study the Sun in the Lyman-alpha line. Part of the OV1 series of USAF satellites, using standardized designs and sent to orbit on decommissioned Atlas ICBMs to reduce development and launching costs, OV1-14 was launched side-by-side with OV1-13. The launch marked the first usage of the Atlas F in the OV program. Unfortunately, the satellite failed after four to seven days, returning about 24 hours of usable data.

== History ==
The Orbiting Vehicle satellite program arose from a US Air Force initiative, begun in the early 1960s, to reduce the expense of space research. Through this initiative, satellites would be standardized to improve reliability and cost-efficiency, and where possible, they would fly on test vehicles or be piggybacked with other satellites. In 1961, the Air Force Office of Aerospace Research (OAR) created the Aerospace Research Support Program (ARSP) to request satellite research proposals and choose mission experiments. The USAF Space and Missiles Organization created their own analog of the ARSP called the Space Experiments Support Program (SESP), which sponsored a greater proportion of technological experiments than the ARSP. Five distinct OV series of standardized satellites were developed under the auspices of these agencies.

The OV1 program, managed by Lt. Col. Clyde Northcott, Jr. was an evolution of the 2.7 m "Scientific Passenger Pods" (SPP), which, starting on 2 October 1961, rode piggyback on suborbital Atlas missile tests and conducted scientific experiments during their short time in space. General Dynamics received a $2 million contract on 13 September 1963 to build a new version of the SPP (called the Atlas Retained Structure (ARS)) that would carry a self-orbiting satellite. Once the Atlas missile and ARS reached apogee, the satellite inside would be deployed and thrust itself into orbit. In addition to the orbital SPP, General Dynamics would create six of these satellites, each to be 3.66 m (12.0 ft) long with a diameter of .762 m (2 ft 6.0 in), able to carry a 136 kg (300 lb) payload into a circular 805 km (500 mi) orbit.

Dubbed "Satellite for Aerospace Research" (SATAR), the series of satellites was originally to be launched from the Eastern Test Range on Atlas missions testing experimental Advanced Ballistic Re-Entry System (ABRES) nosecones. However, in 1964, the Air Force transferred ABRES launches to the Western Test Range causing a year's delay for the program. Moreover, because WTR launches would be into polar orbit as opposed to the low-inclination orbits typical of ETR launches, less mass could be lofted into orbit using the same thrust, and the mass of the SATAR satellites had to be reduced.

Prior to the double launch of which OV1-14 was a part, there had been 12 satellites in the OV1 series, the first orbited on January 21, 1965. All were launched on decommissioned Atlas D ICBMs, with the exception of OV1-1, the last ABRES test launch, and OV1-6, launched via the Titan IIIC tasked for the Manned Orbiting Laboratory test flight.

== Spacecraft design ==
OV1-14, like the rest of the OV1 satellite series, consisted of a cylindrical experiment housing capped with flattened cones on both ends containing 5000 solar cells producing 22 watts of power. Continuing the design trend started with OV1-7, the solar cells were flat rather than curved, as had been in the case with the first six OV1 satellites. Two .46 m (1 ft 6 in) antennae for transmitting telemetry and receiving commands extended from the sides of the spacecraft. 12 helium-pressurized hydrogen peroxide thrusters provided attitude control. There was also a folding boom for mounting one of the radiation experiments. OV1-13 and 14 were the first in the OV1 series to use Pulse-code modulation digital telemetry, which afforded the return of more and more precise data from the satellite.

For stabilization purposes, the satellite was magnetically charged such that it would remain oriented parallel to the Earth's magnetic field, flipping over each time it crossed over one of the Earth's poles. A nutational dampener prevented wobble around the satellites axis of rotation.

In contrast to prior flights utilizing the Atlas D, which mounted multiple OV satellites on a paddle-like extension on the rocket nose, the Atlas F used to launch OV1-13 and 14 enclosed the satellites in a symmetrical shroud measuring 5.4 m (18 ft) in height and 2.1 m (6 ft 11 in) in diameter made of aluminum.

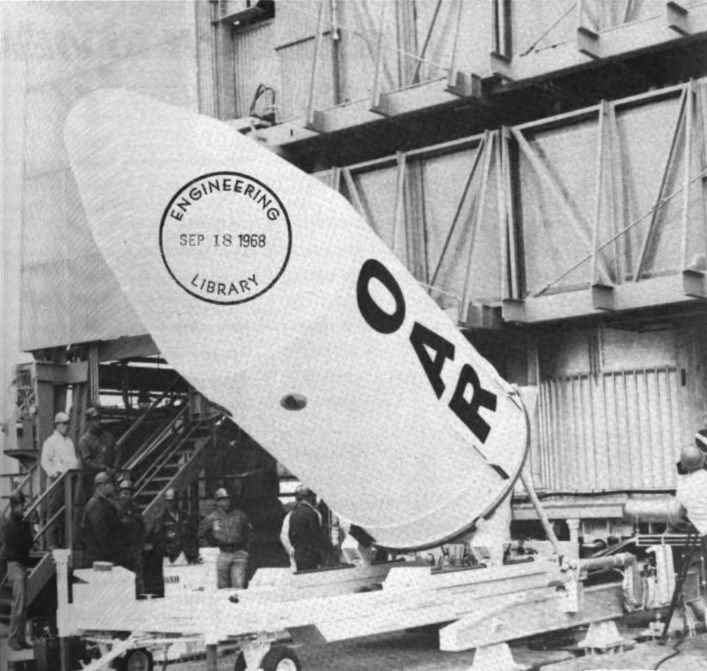
Atlas F shroud for OV1-13 and OV1-14 satellite payload

== Experiments ==
OV1-14 carried nine experiments for the measurement of electromagnetic interference and proton and electron flux at altitudes up to 8,000 km (5,000 mi). OV1-14 carried a Lyman-alpha line photometer for studying the Sun.

== Mission ==
OV1-14 was launched from Vandenberg's 576-A-2 launch pad along with OV1-13 on an Atlas F rocket on 6 April 1968 at 09:59:42 UTC, mounted with OV1-13 on a simple truss framework. Once in orbit, they separated from the rocket carrier and each other using their attached thrusters. The spacecraft was spin-stabilized, rotating about every eight seconds.

After four (or possibly seven) days, the power supply on OV1-14 failed due to overcharging and rupture of its battery, ending a mission that was supposed to last at least a year. Only 84000 seconds (about 24 hours) of usable data was collected, and by that point the satellite was rotating every two seconds.

Enough data was collected to determine that the onboard Faraday cup, used to collect charged particles, was not sensitive enough to measure the flux of particles in orbit. As a result, after OV1-15, OV1 satellites carried electrostatic analyzers instead.

== Legacy and status ==
As of 13 May 2023, OV1-14 is still in orbit, and its position can be tracked on-line. The OV1 program ultimately comprised 22 missions, the last flying on 19 September 1971.
