= OV3-4 =

US Air Force satellite

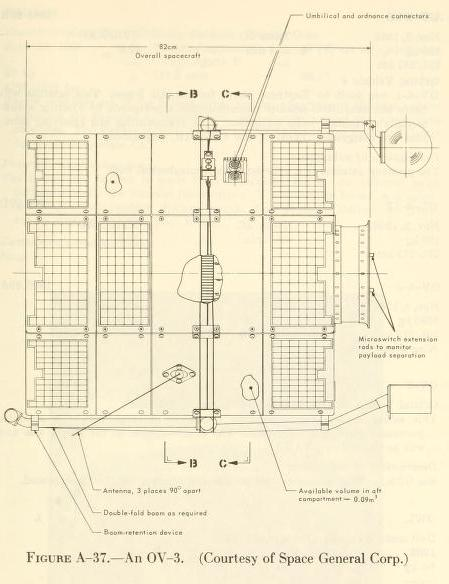
- OV3 satellites schematic
- Mission type: Earth science
- Operator: USAF
- COSPAR ID: 1966-052A
- SATCAT no.: S02201

Spacecraft properties
- Manufacturer: Space General
- Launch mass: 77 kg (170 lb)

Start of mission
- Launch date: 10 June 1966 04:15:00 UTC
- Rocket: Scout B
- Launch site: Wallops Flight Facility Launch Area 3A

Orbital parameters
- Regime: Medium Earth Orbit
- Eccentricity: 0.22423
- Perigee altitude: 647.00 km (402.03 mi)
- Apogee altitude: 4,711.00 km (2,927.28 mi)
- Inclination: 40.900°
- Period: 143 minutes
- Epoch: 10 June 1966 04:19:00

Orbiting Vehicle 3-4 (also known as OV3-4, PHASR, and OPS 1427), launched 10 June 1966, was the second satellite to be launched in the OV3 series of the United States Air Force's Orbiting Vehicle program. The satellite measured radiation above the Earth, helping to determine the hazard posed to human spaceflight at typically traveled altitudes. OV3-4 is still in orbit as of 6 June 2021.

== History ==
The Orbiting Vehicle satellite program arose from a US Air Force initiative, begun in the early 1960s, to reduce the expense of space research. Through this initiative, satellites would be standardized to improve reliability and cost-efficiency, and where possible, they would fly on test vehicles or be piggybacked with other satellites. In 1961, the Air Force Office of Aerospace Research (OAR) created the Aerospace Research Support Program (ARSP) to request satellite research proposals and choose mission experiments. The USAF Space and Missiles Organization created their own analog of the ARSP called the Space Experiments Support Program (SESP), which sponsored a greater proportion of technological experiments than the ARSP. Five distinct OV series of standardized satellites were developed under the auspices of these agencies.

Unlike the previously initiated OV1 and OV2 series of satellites, which were designed to use empty payload space on rocket test launches, the six OV3 satellites all had dedicated Scout boosters. In this regard, the OV3 series was more akin to its civilian science program counterparts (e.g. Explorer). OV3 differed from NASA programs in its heavy use of off-the-shelf equipment, which resulted in lower unit cost.

The first four satellites in the series were made the Aerojet subsidiary Space General Corporation under a $1.35m contract awarded 2 December 1964, the first satellite due October 1965. The last two satellites were built by Air Force Cambridge Research Laboratory (AFCRL), which also managed the entire series and provided four of the OV3 payloads.

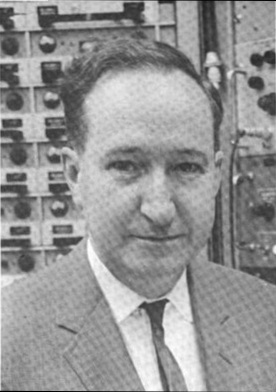
Charles H. Reynolds, Technical Manager of OV3

Charles H. Reynolds, who worked at AFCRL from 1955, was the technical manager for the OV3 program.

OV3-1, launched 22 April 1966, was the first satellite in the OV3 series of the United States Air Force's Orbiting Vehicle program. The satellite measured radiation around the Earth, returning data for over a year.

== Spacecraft design ==
Like the rest of the OV3 satellites, OV3-4 was an octagonal prism, .74 m (2 ft 5 in) in length and width, with experiments mounted on booms. 2560 solar cells provided 30 Watts of power. The satellite was spin-stabilized, but because it was asymmetrical once its booms were extended, OV3-4 maintained its attitude in orbit with a precession damper. A Sun sensor, as well as an onboard tri-axial magnetnometer, gave information on the satellite's aspect (facing), its spin rate, and rate of precession.

OV3-1 massed 77 kilograms (170 lb) Its design life-span was one year.

== Experiments ==
OV3-4's scientific payload, provided by the Air Force Weapons Laboratory (AFWL) and called Personnel Hazards Associated with Space Radiation (PHASR) carried six ionization chambers of differing amounts of shielding ("Tissue Equivalent Ion Chambers" or TEIC) designed to model biological tissue as well as two five-channel spectrometers. The purpose of PHASR was to determine radiation energy-spectrum and dosage data with application toward understanding the long-term impact of radiation on human spaceflight. OV3-4 also carried a triaxial magnetometer (to verify the direction the satellite's instruments were facing at any given time)) and two charged-particle spectrometers, all provided by AFCRL.

== Mission ==
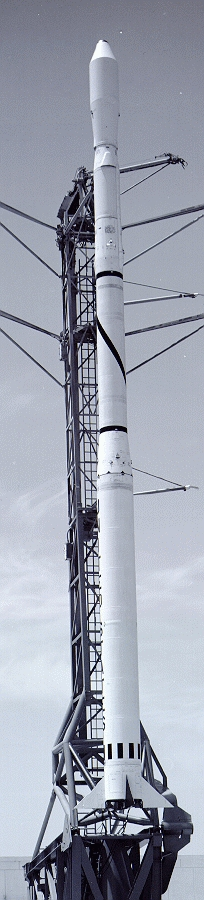
OV3-4 and Scout

Launched from Wallops Flight Facility Launch Area 3A on 10 June 1966 at 4:15:00 UTC via Scout B rocket, OV3-4 was the second to be launched in the OV3 satellite series. The instruments returned good data throughout June and July. By April 1967, the experiments were normally only activated once a week since sufficient results had been obtained, although activation was made as frequently as possible (range-scheduling capability permitting) during periods of high solar activity. Data returned by OV3-4 helped prove and refine the 1966 Vette theoretical model of radiation dosage an astronaut would receive at orbital altitudes. Specifically, it was found that the Vette model was accurate to a factor of two at lower radiation energies, but at higher energies (the radiation that could penetrate the shielding of the thickest TEIC) the Vette model was found to be low by as much as a factor of six.

== Legacy and status ==
As of 7 June 2021, OV3-4 is still in orbit, and its position can be tracked on-line.

The OV3 program ultimately comprised 6 missions, five of them successful. The last (OV3-6) flew on 4 December 1967. The OV3 program was terminated following OV3-6 in favor of the cheaper OV1 program.
