= OV1-13 =

US Air Force satellite

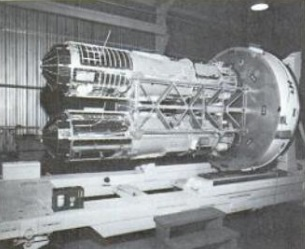
- OV1-13 and OV1-14
- Mission type: Earth science
- Operator: USAF
- COSPAR ID: 1968-026A
- SATCAT no.: S03173

Spacecraft properties
- Manufacturer: General Dynamics
- Launch mass: 107 kg (236 lb)

Start of mission
- Launch date: 6 April 1968 09:59:42 UTC
- Rocket: Atlas F
- Launch site: Vandenberg 576-A-2

End of mission
- Last contact: 3 November 1969

Orbital parameters
- Regime: Low Earth Orbit
- Eccentricity: 0.38500
- Perigee altitude: 588.00 km (365.37 mi)
- Apogee altitude: 9,316.00 km (5,788.69 mi)
- Inclination: 100.050°
- Period: 199.70 minutes
- Epoch: 6 April 1968 10:04:00 UTC

Orbiting Vehicle 1–13 (also known as OV1-13) was a satellite launched on 6 April 1968 to measure the level of radiation in orbit at altitudes as high as 8,000 km (5,000 mi). Part of the OV1 series of USAF satellites, using standardized designs and sent to orbit on decommissioned Atlas ICBMs to reduce development and launching costs, OV1-13 was launched side-by-side with OV1-14. The launch marked the first usage of the Atlas F in the OV program. Operating for more than a year and a half, OV1-13 mapped the grosser characteristics of the Van Allen radiation belts and contributed to the understanding of how particles flow and cause increased intensities during solar storms. As of 12 May 2023, OV1-13 is still in orbit.

== History ==
The Orbiting Vehicle satellite program arose from a US Air Force initiative, begun in the early 1960s, to reduce the expense of space research. Through this initiative, satellites would be standardized to improve reliability and cost-efficiency, and where possible, they would fly on test vehicles or be piggybacked with other satellites. In 1961, the Air Force Office of Aerospace Research (OAR) created the Aerospace Research Support Program (ARSP) to request satellite research proposals and choose mission experiments. The USAF Space and Missiles Organization created their own analog of the ARSP called the Space Experiments Support Program (SESP), which sponsored a greater proportion of technological experiments than the ARSP. Five distinct OV series of standardized satellites were developed under the auspices of these agencies.

The OV1 program, managed by Lt. Col. Clyde Northcott, Jr. was an evolution of the 2.7 m "Scientific Passenger Pods" (SPP), which, starting on 2 October 1961, rode piggyback on suborbital Atlas missile tests and conducted scientific experiments during their short time in space. General Dynamics received a $2 million contract on 13 September 1963 to build a new version of the SPP (called the Atlas Retained Structure (ARS)) that would carry a self-orbiting satellite. Once the Atlas missile and ARS reached apogee, the satellite inside would be deployed and thrust itself into orbit. In addition to the orbital SPP, General Dynamics would create six of these satellites, each to be 3.66 m (12.0 ft) long with a diameter of .762 m (2 ft 6.0 in), able to carry a 136 kg (300 lb) payload into a circular 805 km (500 mi) orbit.

Dubbed "Satellite for Aerospace Research" (SATAR), the series of satellites was originally to be launched from the Eastern Test Range on Atlas missions testing experimental Advanced Ballistic Re-Entry System (ABRES) nosecones. However, in 1964, the Air Force transferred ABRES launches to the Western Test Range causing a year's delay for the program. Moreover, because WTR launches would be into polar orbit as opposed to the low-inclination orbits typical of ETR launches, less mass could be lofted into orbit using the same thrust, and the mass of the SATAR satellites had to be reduced.

Prior to the double launch of which OV1-13 was a part, there had been 12 satellites in the OV1 series, the first orbited on January 21, 1965. All were launched on decommissioned Atlas D ICBMs, with the exception of OV1-1, the last ABRES test launch, and OV1-6, launched via the Titan IIIC tasked for the Manned Orbiting Laboratory test flight.

== Spacecraft design ==
OV1-13, like the rest of the OV1 satellite series, consisted of a cylindrical experiment housing capped with flattened cones on both ends containing 5000 solar cells producing 22 watts of power. Continuing the design trend started with OV1-7, the solar cells were flat rather than curved, as had been in the case with the first six OV1 satellites. Two .46 m (1 ft 6 in) antennae for transmitting telemetry and receiving commands extended from the sides of the spacecraft. 12 helium-pressurized hydrogen peroxide thrusters provided attitude control. There was also a folding boom for mounting one of the radiation experiments. OV1-13 and 14 were the first in the OV1 series to use Pulse-code modulation digital telemetry, which afforded the return of more and more precise data from the satellite.

For stabilization purposes, the satellite was magnetically charged such that it would remain oriented parallel to the Earth's magnetic field, flipping over each time it crossed over one of the Earth's poles. A nutational dampener prevented wobble around the satellites axis of rotation.

In contrast to prior flights utilizing the Atlas D, which mounted multiple OV satellites on a paddle-like extension on the rocket nose, the Atlas F used to launch OV1-13 and 14 enclosed the satellites in a symmetrical shroud measuring 5.4 m (18 ft) in height and 2.1 m (6 ft 11 in) in diameter made of aluminum.

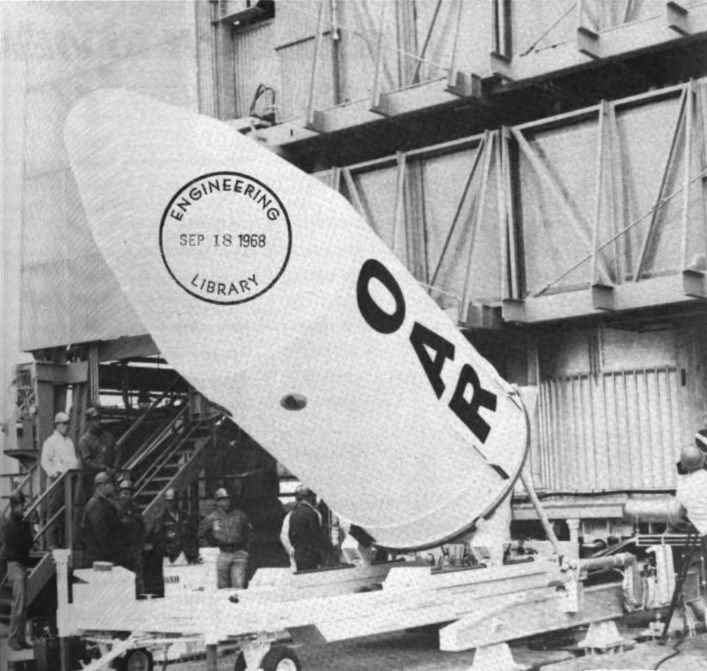
Atlas F shroud for OV1-13 and OV1-14 satellite payload

== Experiments ==
OV1-13 carried ten experiments, eight of which were designed to measure penetrating radiation at altitudes up to 8,000 km (5,000 mi), almost twice as high as any previous OV1 satellites. The experiments included four spectrometers measuring radiation with energies from .1 to 100 KeV, a Geiger counter, an electrostatic analyzer measuring particles in the 1-100 KeV range, and a NASA produced magnetic analyzer. The other two experiments included flexible, curved cadmium sulfide solar cells (successors of which would fly on the 1971 ASTEX satellite), and a friction experiment that interacted several combinations of materials and lubricants with bearings.

== Mission ==
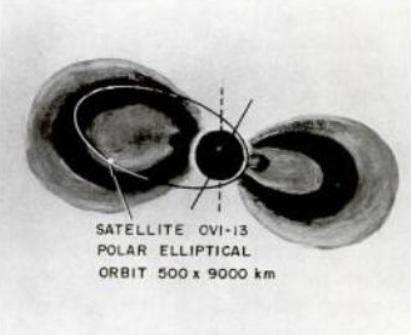
Diagram of OV1-13 orbit with respect to Van Allen radiation belts.

OV1-13 was launched from Vandenberg's 576-A-2 launch pad along with OV-14 on an Atlas F rocket on 6 April 1968 at 09:59:42 UTC, mounted with OV1-14 on a simple truss framework. Once in orbit, they separated from the rocket carrier and each other using their attached thrusters. The spacecraft was spin-stabilized, rotating every 7.5 seconds with its axis perpendicular to its orbit plane.

The spacecraft provided useful data from its launch until November 3, 1969. This data helped map some of the gross features of the radiation belts around the Earth, although there was too little for comprehensive studies. OV-13 did measure increases in energy and intensity of electrons during a geomagnetic storm that took place 10 June 1968. OV1-13 data also clarified how the particle flow caused by solar storms created these high altitude increases.

== Legacy and status ==
As of 12 May 2023, OV1-13 is still in orbit, and its position can be tracked on-line. The OV1 program ultimately comprised 22 missions, the last flying on 19 September 1971.
