= OV2-1 =

US Air Force satellite

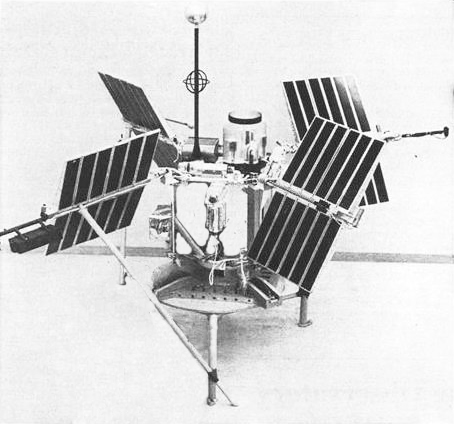
- Image of Orbiting Vehicle (OV) 2-1
- Mission type: Life science
- Operator: USAF
- COSPAR ID: 1965-082C
- SATCAT no.: 01641

Spacecraft properties
- Manufacturer: Northrop
- Launch mass: 170.097 kg (375.00 lb)

Start of mission
- Launch date: 15 October 1965, 17:23:59 UTC
- Rocket: Titan IIIC
- Launch site: Cape Canaveral LC40

Orbital parameters
- Reference system: Geocentric
- Regime: Low Earth
- Eccentricity: 0.00603
- Perigee altitude: 706 km (439 mi)
- Apogee altitude: 792 km (492 mi)
- Inclination: 32.6°
- Period: 99.7 minutes
- Epoch: 15 October 1965

Orbiting Vehicle 2-1 (COSPAR ID: 1965–82C, also known as OV2-1), the first satellite of the second series of the United States Air Force's Orbiting Vehicle program, was an American life science research satellite. Its purpose was to determine the extent of the threat posed to astronauts by the Van Allen radiation belts. Launched 15 October 1965, the mission resulted in failure when the upper stage of OV2-1's Titan IIIC booster broke up.

== Background ==
The Orbiting Vehicle satellite program arose from a US Air Force initiative, begun in the early 1960s, to reduce the expense of space research. Through this initiative, satellites would be standardized to improve reliability and cost-efficiency, and where possible, they would fly on test vehicles or be piggybacked with other satellites. In 1961, the Air Force Office of Aerospace Research (OAR) created the Aerospace Research Support Program (ARSP) to request satellite research proposals and choose mission experiments. The USAF Space and Missiles Organization created their own analog of the ARSP called the Space Experiments Support Program (SESP), which sponsored a greater proportion of technological experiments than the ARSP. Five distinct OV series of standardized satellites were developed under the auspices of these agencies.

The OV2 series of satellites was originally designed as part of the ARENTS (Advanced Research Environmental Test Satellite) program, intended to obtain supporting data for the Vela satellites, which monitored the Earth for violations of the 1963 Partial Test Ban Treaty. Upon the cancellation of ARENTS due to delays in the Centaur rocket stage, the program's hardware (developed by General Dynamics) was repurposed to fly on the Titan III (initially the A, ultimately the C) booster test launches. The USAF contracted Northrop to produce these satellites, with William C. Armstrong of Northrop Space Laboratories serving as the program manager.

== Spacecraft design ==
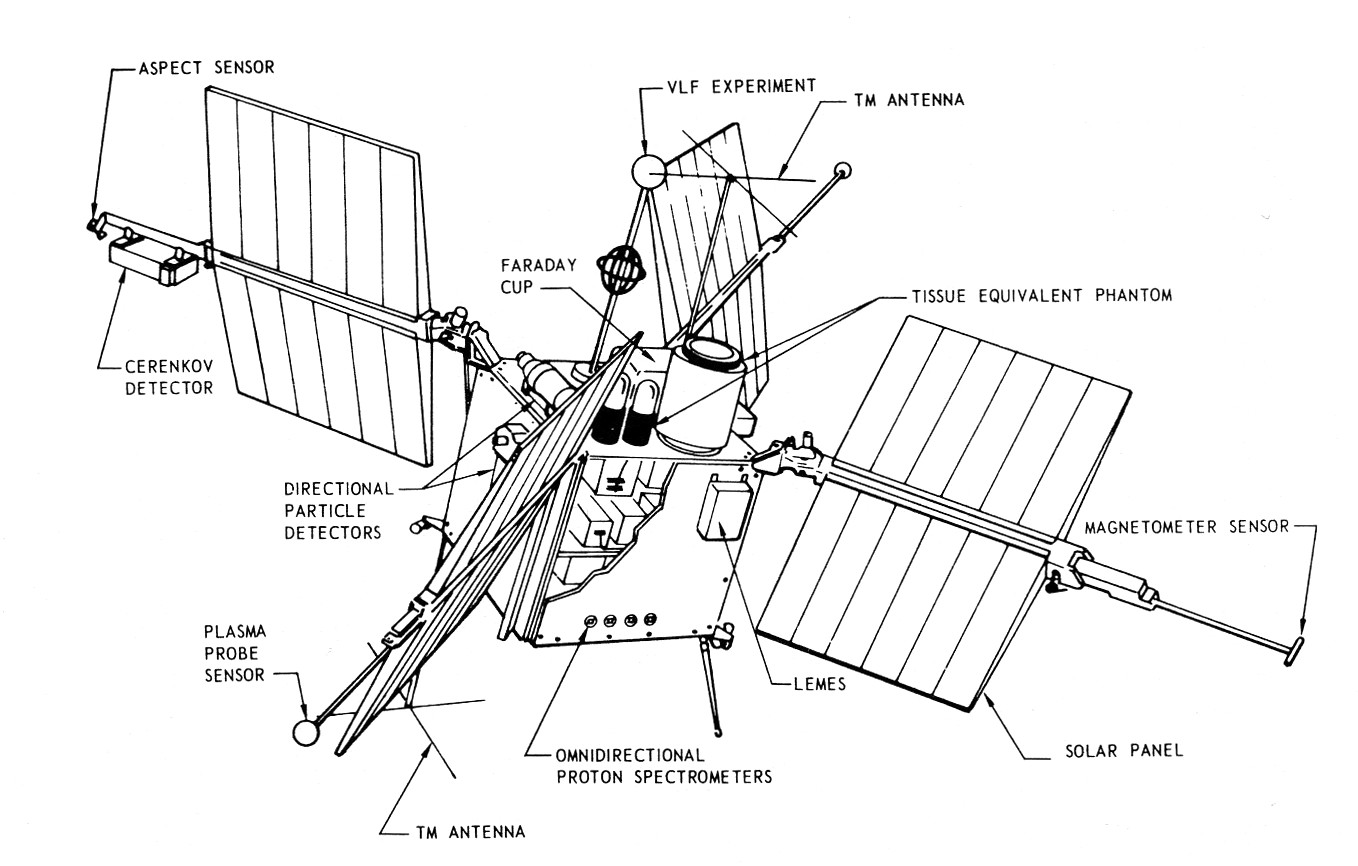
OV2-1 satellite diagram

OV2-1 was built to the configuration standard to all of the OV2 satellites, with a roughly cubical structure of aluminum honeycomb, .61 m (2.0 ft) in height, and .58 m (1.9 ft) wide. Four 2.3 m (7.5 ft) paddle-like solar panels, each with 20,160 solar cells, were mounted at the four upper corners of the main body. The power system, which included NiCd batteries for night-time operations, provided 63 W of power. As with the other craft in the OV2 series, experiments were generally mounted outside the cube while satellite systems, including tape recorder, command receiver, and PAM/FM/FM telemetry system, were installed inside. Four small solid rocket motors spun, one on each paddle, were designed to spin the OV2 satellites upon reaching orbit, providing gyroscopic stability. Cold-gas jets maintained this stability, receiving information on the satellite's alignment with respect to the Sun via an onboard solar aspect sensor, and with respect to the local magnetic field via two onboard fluxgate magnetometers. A damper kept the satellite from precessing (wobbling around its spin axis). Passive thermal control kept the satellite from overheating. The entire satellite weighed 170.097 kg (375.00 lb).

== Experiments ==
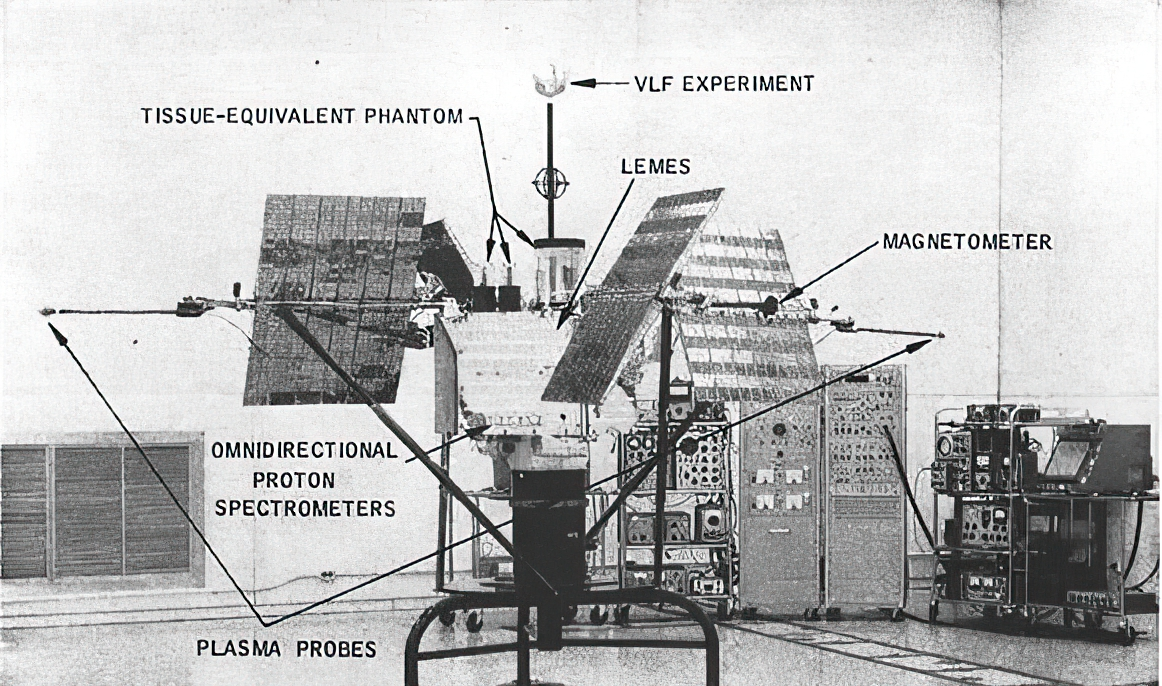
OV2-1 with experiments labeled, one month before launch

OV2-1 was designed to evaluate the long-term hazards of the Earth's Van Allen Belts to astronauts and satellites. Over the course of a year-long mission, the solar-powered satellite would measure nuclear particles, electromagnetic field strength, very low frequency radio waves, and radiation effects on tissue equivalents.

The Air Force's Cambridge Research Center, Weapons Laboratory, and Aerospace Corporation designed the 59 kg (130 lb) scientific and engineering experiment package of fourteen instruments. They included the "Phantom" tissue-equivalent ion chamber (comprising gas-filled tubes simulating the heart, kidneys and lung tissue topped with a Plexiglass cover simulating skin), as well as a Cerenkov counter, a charged particle flux counter, a Faraday Cup electrometer, a magnetic spectrometer, an omnidirectional spectrometer, a scintillation spectrometer, and a plasma wave detector.

Also included as an engineering experiment on OV2-1 was a low-thrust, subliming solid rocket type, developed by Rocket Research Corporation in Seattle, to manage OV2-1's rate of spin.

== Mission ==
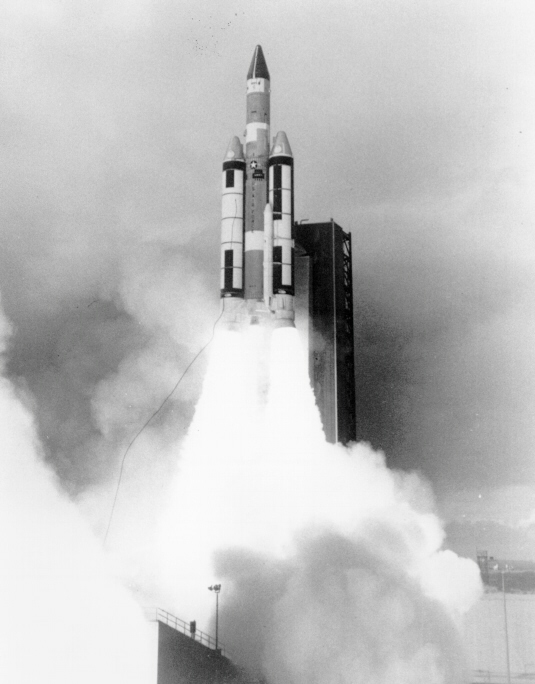
Lift-off of the Titan IIIC rocket carrying OV2-1 and LCS-2 satellites

In its original conception, OV2-1 was to have been launched via Titan 3A rocket to an apogee of 2,400 nmi (4,400 km) and a perigee of 100 nmi (190 km). OV2-1 ultimately was scheduled for launch on the second Titan IIIC test flight on 8 October 1965. However, tests at the Martin/Denver plant determined that there might be issues with the Transtage's pressurization valves; a malfunction of one of the valves had caused a premature shutdown of a Titan 3A test the prior year. The flight was thus delayed one week. A further delay, from 14 October to 15 October, was caused both by bad weather and battery problems in the two "stage zero" solid -propellant side boosters of the Titan IIIC rocket.

OV2-1, along with LCS-2, a 1.12 m (3.7 ft), 34 kg (75 lb) radar calibration sphere, finally made it to space after its Titan IIIC took off on 15 October 1965 at 17:23:59 UT from Cape Canaveral LC40. Once in orbit, the Titan IIIC's Transtage (upper stage) was scheduled to fire ten times, ultimately boosting OV2-1 into its operational orbit. 56 minutes and 10 seconds into the mission, however, at the end of a 24-second burn, one of the two Transtage engines failed to shut down. The booster tumbled and then exploded, stranding the satellite amidst the debris in a nearly circular orbit about 750 km (470 mi) above the Earth.

== Legacy and status ==
The satellite and large pieces of the transtage are still in orbit as of February 2020, and LCS-2 reentered on 25 August 1982. Though its mission was a failure, seven of OV2-1's experiments were reflown on the successful (smaller) OV3-3 mission, launched 4 August 1966.

Two follow-on satellites (OV2-2 and -3) with different mission objectives were originally planned when the OV2 program began. The OV2 series was ultimately expanded to five satellites, all with different goals. Only one, the radiation and astronomical satellite OV2-5, achieved a degree of success.
