= OV1-8 =

US Air Force satellite

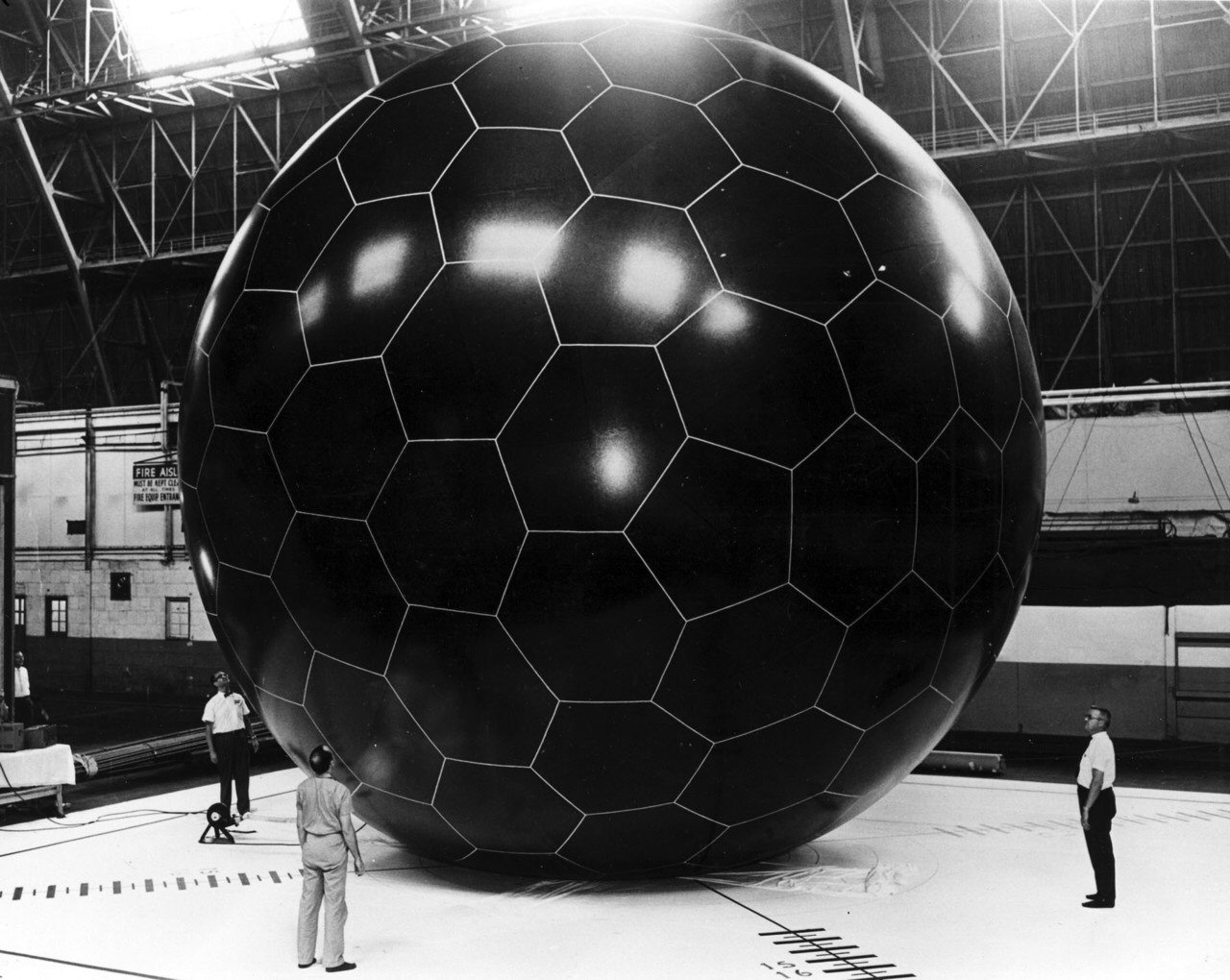
- OV1-8
- Mission type: Earth science
- Operator: USAF
- COSPAR ID: 1966-063A
- SATCAT no.: S02324

Spacecraft properties
- Manufacturer: General Dynamics
- Launch mass: 10.4 kg (23 lb) with onboard rocket.
- BOL mass: 3.2 kilograms (7.1 lb)
- Dimensions: 9.1-meter (30 ft) sphere

Start of mission
- Launch date: 14 July 1966 02:10:02 UTC
- Rocket: Atlas D
- Launch site: Vandenberg 576-B-3

End of mission
- Decay date: 4 January 1978

Orbital parameters
- Regime: Low Earth Orbit
- Eccentricity: 0.00102
- Perigee altitude: 998.00 km (620.13 mi)
- Apogee altitude: 1,013.00 km (629.45 mi)
- Inclination: 144.200°
- Period: 105.20 minutes
- Epoch: 14 July 1966 02:09:00

Orbiting Vehicle 1-8 (also known as OV1-8, OV1-8P,PasComSat, and Gridsphere), launched 14 July 1966, was the seventh satellite launched (fourth successfully) in the OV1 series of the United States Air Force's Orbiting Vehicle program. OV1-8 was designed to test the passive communications utility of an aluminum grid sphere versus a balloon satellite (e.g. NASA's Project Echo). Whereas a conventional balloon satellite had a solid skin, OV1-8 consisted of a fine grid of aluminium antenna wires embedded in a balloon structure that was designed to disintegrate when subject to ultraviolet radiation, leaving the spherical wire grid intact.

== History ==
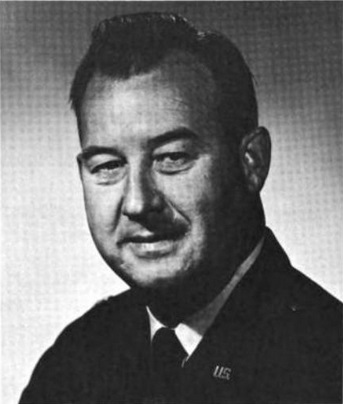
Lt. Col. Clyde Northcott, Jr., OV1 program manager

The Orbiting Vehicle satellite program arose from a US Air Force initiative, begun in the early 1960s, to reduce the expense of space research. Through this initiative, satellites would be standardized to improve reliability and cost-efficiency, and where possible, they would fly on test vehicles or be piggybacked with other satellites. In 1961, the Air Force Office of Aerospace Research (OAR) created the Aerospace Research Support Program (ARSP) to request satellite research proposals and choose mission experiments. The USAF Space and Missiles Organization created their own analog of the ARSP called the Space Experiments Support Program (SESP), which sponsored a greater proportion of technological experiments than the ARSP. Five distinct OV series of standardized satellites were developed under the auspices of these agencies.

The OV1 series was an evolution of the 2.7 m "Scientific Passenger Pods" (SPP), which, starting on 2 October 1961, rode piggyback on suborbital Atlas missile tests and conducted scientific experiments during their short time in space. General Dynamics received a $2 million contract on 13 September 1963 to build a new version of the SPP (called the Atlas Retained Structure (ARS)) that would carry a self-orbiting satellite. Once the Atlas missile and ARS reached apogee, the satellite inside would be deployed and thrust itself into orbit. In addition to the orbital SPP, General Dynamics would create six of these satellites, each to be 3.66 m (12.0 ft) long with a diameter of .762 m (2 ft 6.0 in), able to carry a 136 kg (300 lb) payload into a circular 805 km (500 mi) orbit.

Dubbed "Satellite for Aerospace Research" (SATAR), the series of satellites was originally to be launched from the Eastern Test Range on Atlas missions testing experimental Advanced Ballistic Re-Entry System (ABRES) nosecones. However, in 1964, the Air Force transferred ABRES launches to the Western Test Range causing a year's delay for the program. Moreover, because WTR launches would be into polar orbit as opposed to the low-inclination orbits typical of ETR launches, less mass could be lofted into orbit using the same thrust, and the mass of the SATAR satellites had to be reduced. The OV1 program was managed by Lt. Col. Clyde Northcott, Jr.

The first OV1 satellite to be launched was OV1-1 on January 21, 1965. Though OV1-1's Atlas booster performed properly, the satellite's onboard Altair rocket did not fire, and the probe was lost. OV1-1 was the only satellite launched on an ABRES mission. Starting with OV1-3, launched and lost May 27, 1965, the remaining OV1 satellites all flew on Atlas D and F missiles that had been decommissioned from ICBM duty (except OV1-6, which flew on the Manned Orbiting Laboratory test flight on 2 November 1966). OV1-2, the first successful satellite in the OV1 series, was launched 5 October 1965. OV1-2 pioneered the back-to-back launch configuration under which two OV1 satellites could be carried on the same rocket, although OV1-2 flew alone. This configuration was used in the successful co-launch of OV1-4 and OV1-5 on 30 March 1966.

== Spacecraft design ==
OV1-8 was unique among the OV1 satellites in abandoning the standardized cylindrical, solar-powered form. OV1-8 was a 9.14 m (30.0 ft), 3.2 kg (7.1 lb) open spherical grid of fine aluminum wires mounted in an inflatable balloon, produced by Goodyear Aerospace, of polybutyl methacrylate. With its specially modified propulsion module, OV1-8 massed 10.4 kg (23 lb).

== Experiments ==
The entire satellite, OV1-8, was an experiment prepared by the Avionics Laboratory of Wright-Patterson Air Force Base to test the utility of the aluminum grid sphere as a passive communications satellite versus prior balloon satellites (e.g. NASA's Project Echo). It was calculated that an open grid would encounter less drag from the upper atmosphere than a solid balloon.

== Mission ==
Launched from Vandenberg's 576-B-3 launch pad on 14 July 1966 at 02:10:02 UTC via Atlas D rocket, alongside the unsuccessful solar x-ray, nightglow, and charged particles satellite OV1-7. OV1-8's solid rocket motor delivered it to a nearly circular 1,000 km (620 mi) orbit, and 100 seconds later the satellite separated from its rocket and inflated with helium. Within an hour, the plastic had been completely disintegrated by solar ultraviolet radiation, as planned, leaving a spherical aluminum grid behind. Subsequent tests determined that the aluminum grid had a reflectivity five times higher than that of an ordinary balloon.

OV1-8's retrograde orbit was chosen to accentuate the drag and perturbation caused by the upper atmosphere to analyze their effect on the satellite's motion. Despite the increased drag, OV1-8 remained in orbit for more than 11 years, reentering the Earth's atmosphere on 4 January 1978.

== Legacy and status ==
The unused cylindrical body removed from OV1-8, along with OV1-6's unused Altair 2 propulsion module, was later used in the construction of OV1-86, launched 27 July 1967. The OV1 program ultimately comprised 22 missions, the last flying on 19 September 1971.
