= OV1-11 =

US Air Force satellite

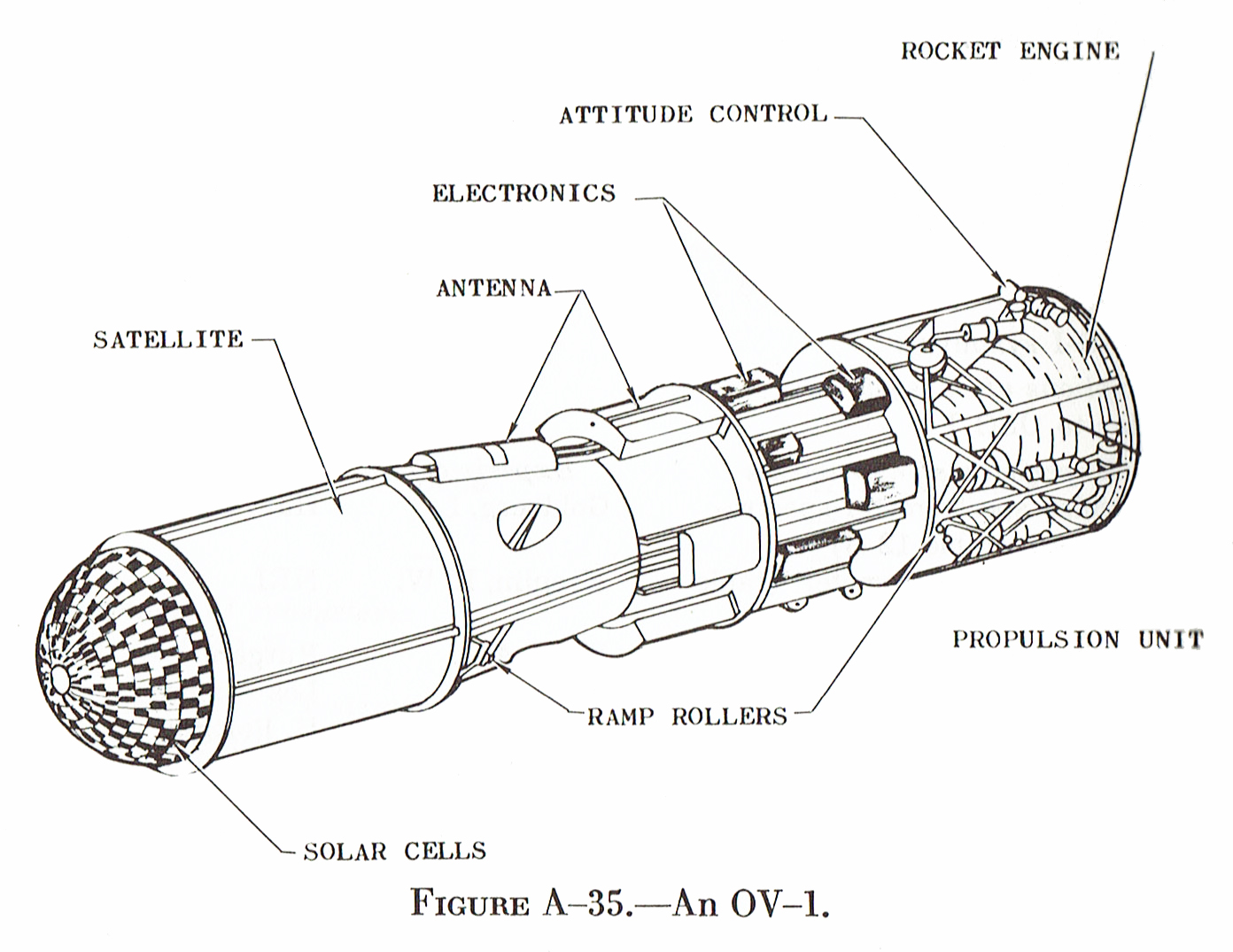
- OV1 series satellite
- Mission type: Earth science
- Operator: USAF
- COSPAR ID: 1967-072
- SATCAT no.: F00438

Spacecraft properties
- Manufacturer: General Dynamics
- Launch mass: 134 kg (295 lb) with Altair

Start of mission
- Launch date: 27 July 1967 19:00:03 UTC
- Rocket: Atlas D
- Launch site: Vandenberg 576-B-3

End of mission
- Decay date: 27 July 1967

Orbital parameters
- Regime: Low Earth Orbit

Orbiting Vehicle 1-11 (also known as OV1-11) was an American satellite launched 27 July 1967 to study a range of environmental conditions in the upper atmosphere. Part of the OV1 series of USAF satellites, using standardized designs and sent to orbit on decommissioned Atlas ICBMs to reduce development and launching costs, OV1-12 was launched with two other satellites in the series, OV1-12 and OV1-86, in the first triple launch of the program. The satellite was lost during launch when its onboard propulsion module failed.

== History ==
The Orbiting Vehicle satellite program arose from a US Air Force initiative, begun in the early 1960s, to reduce the expense of space research. Through this initiative, satellites would be standardized to improve reliability and cost-efficiency, and where possible, they would fly on test vehicles or be piggybacked with other satellites. In 1961, the Air Force Office of Aerospace Research (OAR) created the Aerospace Research Support Program (ARSP) to request satellite research proposals and choose mission experiments. The USAF Space and Missiles Organization created their own analog of the ARSP called the Space Experiments Support Program (SESP), which sponsored a greater proportion of technological experiments than the ARSP. Five distinct OV series of standardized satellites were developed under the auspices of these agencies.

The OV1 program, managed by Lt. Col. Clyde Northcott, Jr. was an evolution of the 2.7 m "Scientific Passenger Pods" (SPP), which, starting on 2 October 1961, rode piggyback on suborbital Atlas missile tests and conducted scientific experiments during their short time in space. General Dynamics received a $2 million contract on 13 September 1963 to build a new version of the SPP (called the Atlas Retained Structure (ARS)) that would carry a self-orbiting satellite. Once the Atlas missile and ARS reached apogee, the satellite inside would be deployed and thrust itself into orbit. In addition to the orbital SPP, General Dynamics would create six of these satellites, each to be 3.66 m (12.0 ft) long with a diameter of .762 m (2 ft 6.0 in), able to carry a 136 kg (300 lb) payload into a circular 805 km (500 mi) orbit.

Dubbed "Satellite for Aerospace Research" (SATAR), the series of satellites was originally to be launched from the Eastern Test Range on Atlas missions testing experimental Advanced Ballistic Re-Entry System (ABRES) nosecones. However, in 1964, the Air Force transferred ABRES launches to the Western Test Range causing a year's delay for the program. Moreover, because WTR launches would be into polar orbit as opposed to the low-inclination orbits typical of ETR launches, less mass could be lofted into orbit using the same thrust, and the mass of the SATAR satellites had to be reduced.

Prior to the triple launch of which OV1-11 was a part, there had been ten satellites in the OV1 series launched, the first on January 21, 1965. All were launched on decommissioned Atlas D ICBMs, with the exception of OV1-1, the last ABRES test launch, and OV1-6, launched via the Titan IIIC tasked for the Manned Orbiting Laboratory test flight.

== Spacecraft design ==
OV1-11, like the rest of the OV1 satellite series, consisted of a cylindrical experiment housing capped with flattened cones on both ends containing 5000 solar cells producing 22 watts of power. Continuing the design trend started with OV1-7, the solar cells were flat rather than curved, as had been in the case with the first six OV1 satellites. Two .46 m (1 ft 6 in) antennae for transmitting telemetry and receiving commands extended from the sides of the spacecraft. 12 helium-pressurized hydrogen peroxide thrusters provided attitude control.

Along with its sister craft, OV1-12, OV1-11 was the first in the OV1 series to use the upgraded Altair 3 booster capable of 26586 N of thrust. The satellite massed, with its attached Altair booster, 134 kg (295 lb).

== Experiments ==
OV1-11's scientific package included eight experiments for a variety of investigations. Two instruments were devoted to studying solar x-rays while an ultraviolet spectrometer would measure UV radiance. Two spectrometers and a faraday cup were designed to measure space plasmas. Another experiment would measure the oxygen in the upper atmosphere. Finally, instruments were included to study Earth's nightglow and also radio emissions on the VLF and LF bands.

== Mission ==
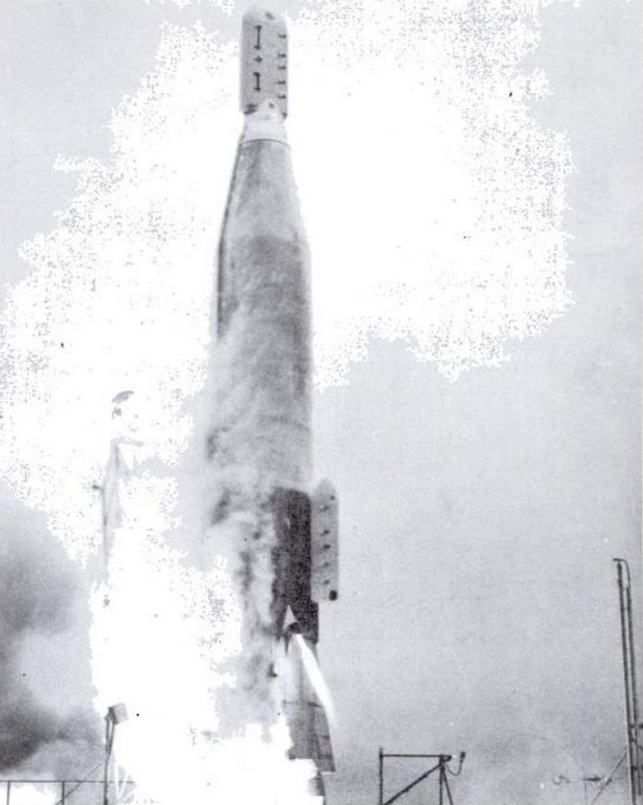
OV1-11 launch (installed in the nose SPP)

OV1-11 was launched from Vandenberg's 576-B-3 launch pad along with OV-12 and OV-86 via Atlas D rocket on 27 July 1967 at 19:00:03 UTC, in the first triple OV1 launch. Mounted alongside OV-12 in the nose SPP (OV1-86 being installed in a separate, side-mounted SPP), OV1-11 was lost when its Altair rocket failed to ignite.

== Legacy and status ==
The OV1 program ultimately comprised 22 missions, the last flying on 19 September 1971.
