= OV1-86 =

US Air Force satellite

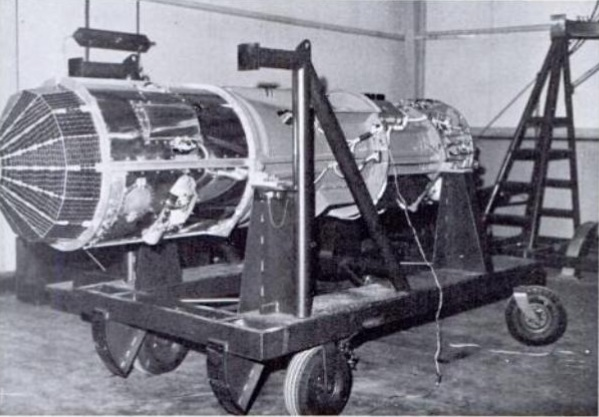
- OV1-86 on a cart awaiting installation on its Atlas rocket
- Mission type: Earth science
- Operator: USAF
- COSPAR ID: 1967-072A
- SATCAT no.: S02893

Spacecraft properties
- Manufacturer: General Dynamics
- Launch mass: 118 kg (260 lb) with Altair

Start of mission
- Launch date: 27 July 1967 19:00:03 UTC
- Rocket: Atlas D
- Launch site: Vandenberg 576-B-3

End of mission
- Decay date: 22 February 1972

Orbital parameters
- Regime: Low Earth Orbit
- Eccentricity: 0.00895
- Perigee altitude: 480.00 km (298.26 mi)
- Apogee altitude: 604.00 km (375.31 mi)
- Inclination: 101.600°
- Period: 95.50 minutes
- Epoch: 27 July 1967 18:57:00 UTC

Orbiting Vehicle 1-86 (also known as OV1-86) was a satellite launched 27 July 1967 to measure the temperature radiation properties of different types of terrain. Part of the OV1 series of USAF satellites, using standardized designs and sent to orbit on decommissioned Atlas ICBMs to reduce development and launching costs, OV1-86 was launched with two other satellites in the series, OV1-11 and OV1-12, in the first triple launch of the program. It was the only OV1 satellite to be cobbled together from two of its sister satellites, utilizing the unused body on OV1-8 and the unused propulsion module on OV1-6. OV1-86's was only partially successful due to the failure of its Vertistat gravity-gradient stabilization system. The satellite reentered the Earth's atmosphere on 22 February 1972.

== History ==
The Orbiting Vehicle satellite program arose from a US Air Force initiative, begun in the early 1960s, to reduce the expense of space research. Through this initiative, satellites would be standardized to improve reliability and cost-efficiency, and where possible, they would fly on test vehicles or be piggybacked with other satellites. In 1961, the Air Force Office of Aerospace Research (OAR) created the Aerospace Research Support Program (ARSP) to request satellite research proposals and choose mission experiments. The USAF Space and Missiles Organization created their own analog of the ARSP called the Space Experiments Support Program (SESP), which sponsored a greater proportion of technological experiments than the ARSP. Five distinct OV series of standardized satellites were developed under the auspices of these agencies.

The OV1 program, managed by Lt. Col. Clyde Northcott, Jr. was an evolution of the 2.7 m "Scientific Passenger Pods" (SPP), which, starting on 2 October 1961, rode piggyback on suborbital Atlas missile tests and conducted scientific experiments during their short time in space. General Dynamics received a $2 million contract on 13 September 1963 to build a new version of the SPP (called the Atlas Retained Structure (ARS)) that would carry a self-orbiting satellite. Once the Atlas missile and ARS reached apogee, the satellite inside would be deployed and thrust itself into orbit. In addition to the orbital SPP, General Dynamics would create six of these satellites, each to be 3.66 m (12.0 ft) long with a diameter of .762 m (2 ft 6.0 in), able to carry a 136 kg (300 lb) payload into a circular 805 km (500 mi) orbit.

Dubbed "Satellite for Aerospace Research" (SATAR), the series of satellites was originally to be launched from the Eastern Test Range on Atlas missions testing experimental Advanced Ballistic Re-Entry System (ABRES) nosecones. However, in 1964, the Air Force transferred ABRES launches to the Western Test Range causing a year's delay for the program. Moreover, because WTR launches would be into polar orbit as opposed to the low-inclination orbits typical of ETR launches, less mass could be lofted into orbit using the same thrust, and the mass of the SATAR satellites had to be reduced.

Prior to the triple launch of which OV1-86 was a part, there had been ten satellites in the OV1 series launched, the first on January 21, 1965. All were launched on decommissioned Atlas D ICBMs, with the exception of OV1-1, the last ABRES test launch, and OV1-6, launched via the Titan IIIC tasked for the Manned Orbiting Laboratory test flight.

== Spacecraft design ==
OV1-86, like the rest of the OV1 satellite series, consisted of a cylindrical experiment housing capped with flattened cones on both ends containing 5000 solar cells producing 22 watts of power. Continuing the design trend started with OV1-7, the solar cells were flat rather than curved, as had been in the case with the first six OV1 satellites. Two .46 m (1 ft 6 in) antennae for transmitting telemetry and receiving commands extended from the sides of the spacecraft. 12 helium-pressurized hydrogen peroxide thrusters provided attitude control.

What distinguished OV1-86 was that cobbled together from two prior OV1 satellites. OV1-6, launched via the restartable Titan, did not need its Altair 2 propulsion module, while the balloon satellite OV1-8 did not use the standard OV1 shell. OV1-86 combined these components into a new satellite.

OV1-86 was the second in the series (after the unsuccessful OV1-7) equipped with the Vertistat stabilisation system, developed for the Advanced Research Environmental Test Satellite (ARENTS) that eventually became OV2. Vertistat was designed to maintain a satellite's orientation using the small difference in gravitational potential between the central body and the ends of equipment booms. The satellite massed, with its attached Altair booster, 118 kg (260 lb).

== Experiments ==
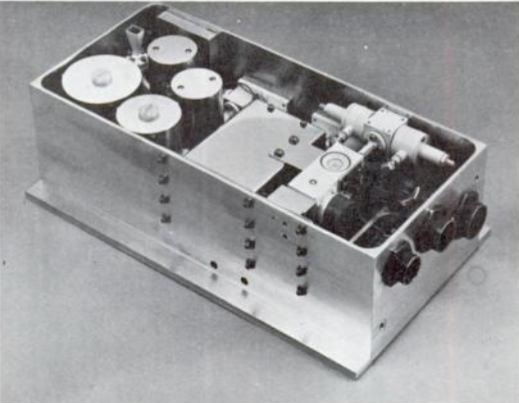
OV1-86 oxygen radiometer

The scientific payload on OV1-86 was designed to continue the work of OV1-5, measuring the temperature radiation properties of different types of terrain. The package included four experiments including a cosmic ray telescope to determine the isotropy of cosmic ray particles and a body-mounted Dicke radiometer that measured in the 60-gHz molecular oxygen absorption band Up to two hours of radiometric data could be stored on magnetic tape, but the satellite was also capable of real-time data transmission., though this was impractical given the few ground stations that could process the data and the briefness (~10 minutes) with which the satellite was in transmission range. The two other experiments included an interferometer and another radiometer to map the Earth in the near-infrared spectrum.

== Mission ==
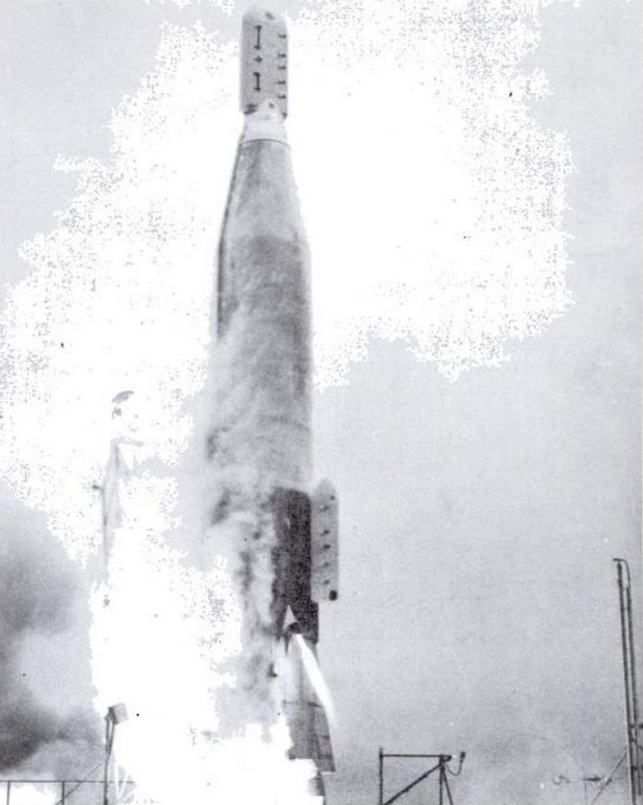
OV1-86 launch (installed in the side SPP)

OV1-86 was launched from Vandenberg's 576-B-3 launch pad along with OV-11 and OV-12 via Atlas D rocket on 27 July 1967 at 19:00:03 UTC, in the first triple OV1 launch. The Veristat failed to stabilize the satellite, which tumbled through its orbit. The satellite's experiments were turned on after the 25th orbit, whereupon it was discovered that for the most part, OV1-86 was pointed away from the Earth. The oxygen radiometer was thus unable to map the temperature radiation of the Earth. It did function, however, returning an expected 0° K temperature for deep space and a (not particularly accurate) measurement of 230° K for the Earth.

== Legacy and status ==
OV1-86 reentered the Earth's atmosphere on 22 February 1972. The OV1 program ultimately comprised 22 missions, the last flying on 19 September 1971.
