= OV1-5 =

US Air Force satellite

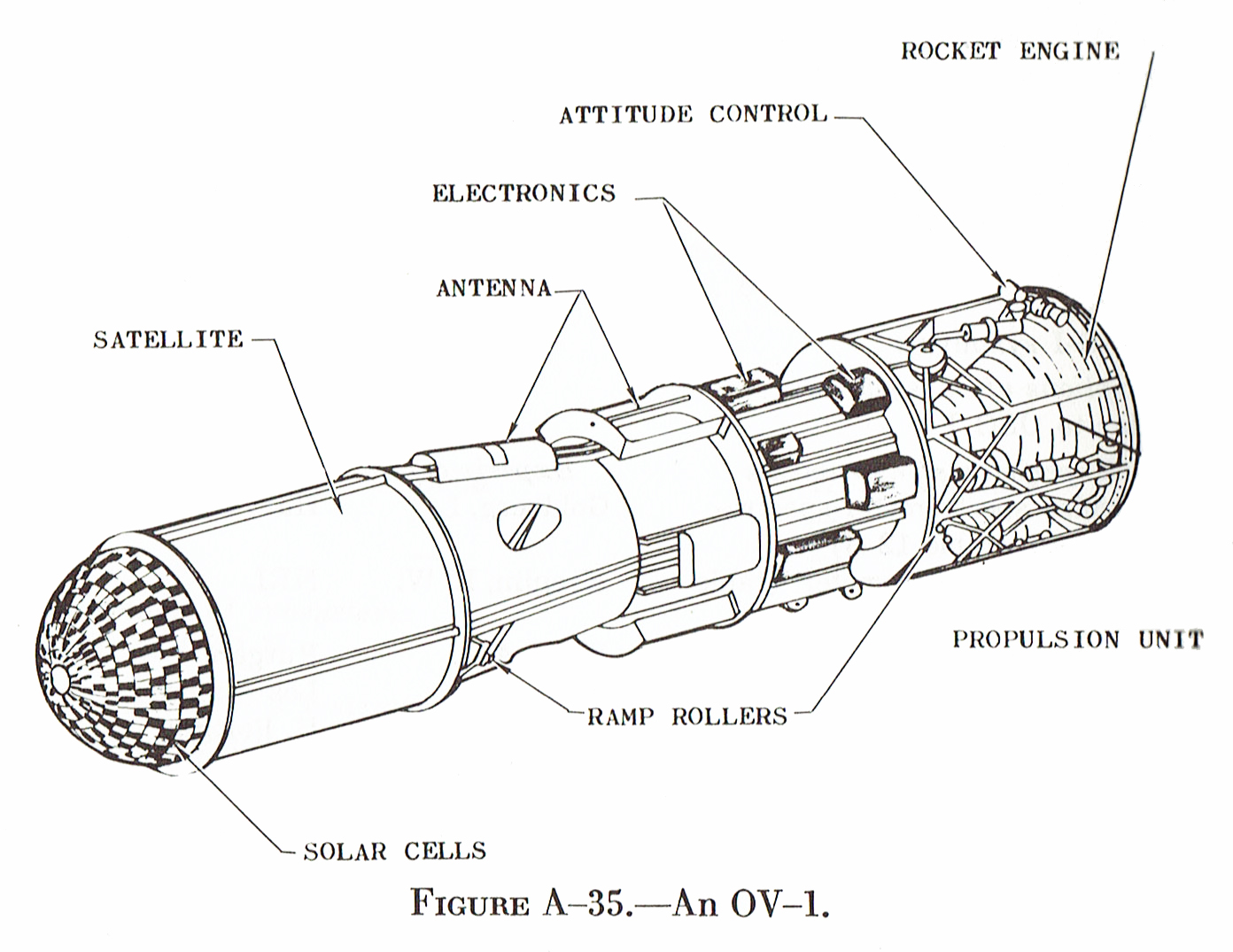
- OV1 series satellite
- Mission type: Earth science
- Operator: USAF
- COSPAR ID: 1966-025B
- SATCAT no.: S02122

Spacecraft properties
- Manufacturer: General Dynamics
- Launch mass: 114.3 kg (252 lb) with Altair

Start of mission
- Launch date: 30 Mar 1966 09:20:12 UTC
- Rocket: Atlas D
- Launch site: Vandenberg 576-B-3

Orbital parameters
- Regime: Low Earth Orbit
- Eccentricity: 0.00479
- Perigee altitude: 987.00 km (613.29 mi)
- Apogee altitude: 1,058.00 km (657.41 mi)
- Inclination: 144.600°
- Period: 105.60 minutes
- Epoch: 1966-03-30 09:21:00

Orbiting Vehicle 1-5 (also known as OV1-5) was launched 30 Mar 1966, and was the fifth satellite (and third successful satellite) in the OV1 series of the United States Air Force's Orbiting Vehicle program. OV1-5 conducted optical experiments, surveying the Earth in the infrared spectrum to see if water, land, mountains and deserts could be distinguished by their thermal gradients. It was launched concurrently with OV1-4 in the first ever side-by-side satellite orbital deployment.

== History ==
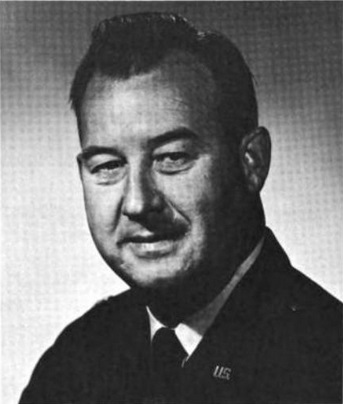
Lt. Col. Clyde Northcott, Jr., OV1 program manager

The Orbiting Vehicle satellite program arose from a US Air Force initiative, begun in the early 1960s, to reduce the expense of space research. Through this initiative, satellites would be standardized to improve reliability and cost-efficiency, and where possible, they would fly on test vehicles or be piggybacked with other satellites. In 1961, the Air Force Office of Aerospace Research (OAR) created the Aerospace Research Support Program (ARSP) to request satellite research proposals and choose mission experiments. The USAF Space and Missiles Organization created their own analog of the ARSP called the Space Experiments Support Program (SESP), which sponsored a greater proportion of technological experiments than the ARSP. Five distinct OV series of standardized satellites were developed under the auspices of these agencies.

The OV1 series was an evolution of the 2.7 m "Scientific Passenger Pods" (SPP), which, starting on 2 October 1961, rode piggyback on suborbital Atlas missile tests and conducted scientific experiments during their short time in space. General Dynamics received a $2 million contract on 13 September 1963 to build a new version of the SPP (called the Atlas Retained Structure (ARS)) that would carry a self-orbiting satellite. Once the Atlas missile and ARS reached apogee, the satellite inside would be deployed and thrust itself into orbit. In addition to the orbital SPP, General Dynamics would create six of these satellites, each to be 3.66 m (12.0 ft) long with a diameter of .762 m (2 ft 6.0 in), able to carry a 136 kg (300 lb) payload into a circular 805 km (500 mi) orbit.

Dubbed "Satellite for Aerospace Research" (SATAR), the series of satellites was originally to be launched from the Eastern Test Range on Atlas missions testing experimental Advanced Ballistic Re-Entry System (ABRES) nosecones. However, in 1964, the Air Force transferred ABRES launches to the Western Test Range causing a year's delay for the program. Moreover, because WTR launches would be into polar orbit as opposed to the low-inclination orbits typical of ETR launches, less mass could be lofted into orbit using the same thrust, and the mass of the SATAR satellites had to be reduced. The OV1 program was managed by Lt. Col. Clyde Northcott, Jr.

The first OV1 satellite to be launched was OV1-1 on January 21, 1965. Though OV1-1's Atlas booster performed properly, the satellite's onboard Altair rocket did not fire, and the probe was lost. OV1-1 was the only satellite launched on an ABRES mission. Starting with OV1-3, launched and lost May 27, 1965, the remaining OV1 satellites all flew on Atlas D and F missiles that had been decommissioned from ICBM duty (except OV1-6, which flew on the Manned Orbiting Laboratory test flight on 2 November 1966). OV1-2, the first successful satellite in the OV1 series, was launched 5 October 1965. OV1-2 pioneered the back-to-back launch configuration under which two OV1 satellites could be carried on the same rocket, although OV1-2 flew alone. This configuration would be used in the co-launch of OV1-4 and OV1-5.

== Spacecraft design ==
OV1-5 was, like the rest of the OV1 satellite series, 1.387 m (4 ft 6.6 in) long and .69 m (2 ft 3 in) in diameter, consisting of a cylindrical experiment housing capped with flattened cones on both ends containing 5000 solar cells producing 22 watts of power. Two .46 m (1 ft 6 in) antennae for transmitting telemetry and receiving commands extended from the sides of the spacecraft. 12 helium-pressurized hydrogen peroxide thrusters provided attitude control.

OV1-5 weighed, with its attached Altair booster, 114.3 kg (252 lb).

== Experiments ==
OV1-5's 46.3 kg (102 lb) experiment package included five infrared optical instruments built by Cambridge Research Laboratories, collectively called the Background Optical Radiation Experiment. Their goal was to determine if different terrain types on the Earth's surface (water, land, mountains and deserts) could be distinguished by their temperature gradients.

== Mission ==
Launched from Vandenberg's 576-B-3 launch pad on 30 Mar 1966 at 09:20:12 UTC via Atlas D rocket, OV1-5 and the co-launched OV1-4 were the first satellites to be placed into orbit side-by-side (as opposed to serially. OV1-4 and OV1-5 had similar but not identical low orbits. OV1-5 performed its mission, data from its time in orbit adding to the body of spectrometric observations of the Earth. In addition to various dedicated USAF facilities, the 150 ft (46 m) parabolic dish at Sagamore Hill Radio Observatory was used on an as available basis to receive data from OV1-5.

== Legacy and status ==
As of 24 March 2021, OV1-5 is still in orbit, and its position can be tracked on-line.

The OV1 program ultimately comprised 22 missions, the last flying on 19 September 1971.
