= OV1-7 =

US Air Force satellite

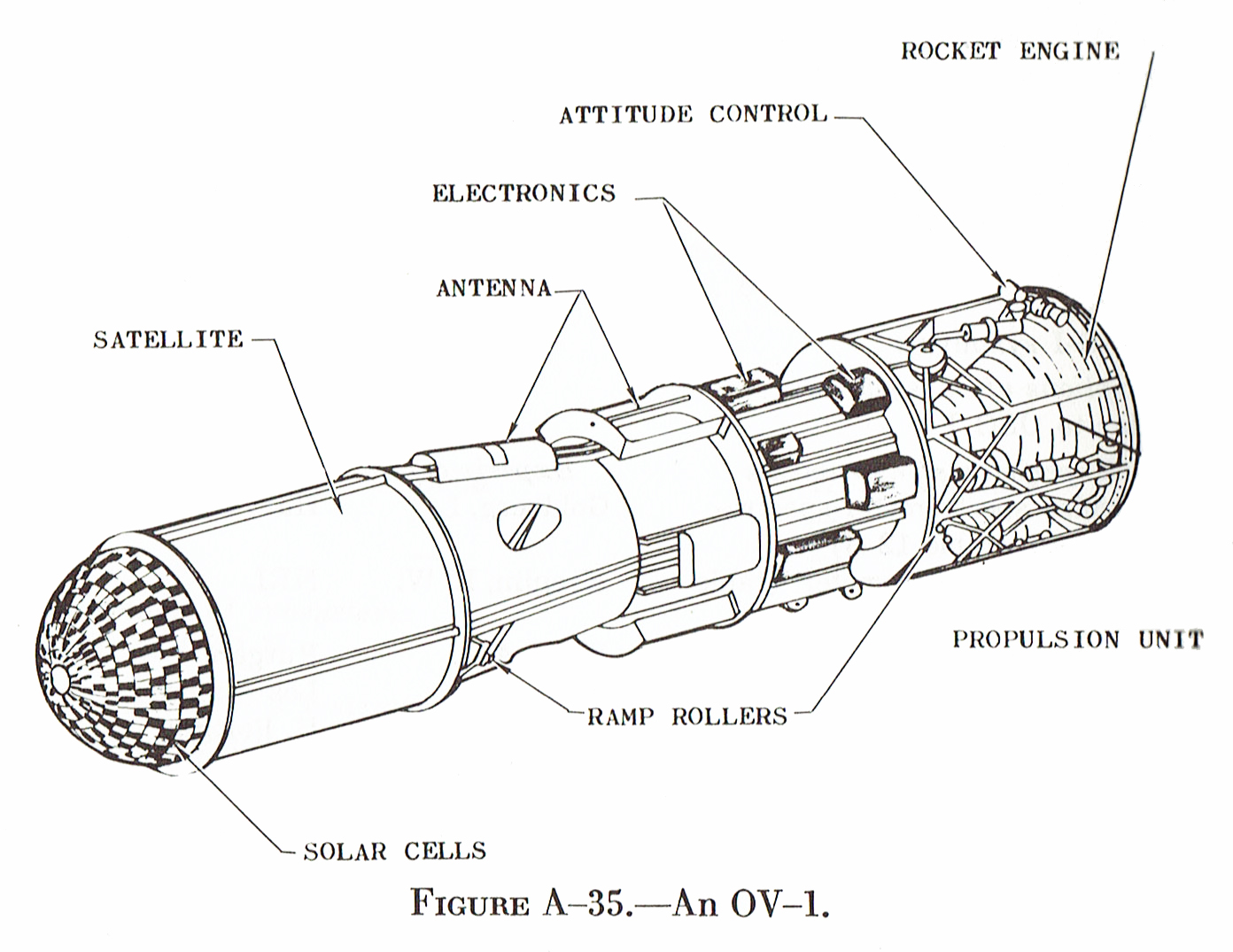
- OV1 series satellite
- Mission type: Earth science
- Operator: USAF
- COSPAR ID: 1966-063
- SATCAT no.: F00389

Spacecraft properties
- Manufacturer: General Dynamics
- Launch mass: 118 kg (260 lb) with Altair

Start of mission
- Launch date: 14 July 1966 02:10:02 UTC
- Rocket: Atlas D
- Launch site: Vandenberg 576-B-3

Orbiting Vehicle 1-7 (also known as OV1-7), launched 14 July 1966, was the sixth satellite launched in the OV1 series of the United States Air Force's Orbiting Vehicle program. OV1-7 was a sky science satellite, designed to return data on charged particles in orbit as well as measurements of solar X-rays and nightglow. Co-launched with OV1-8, the satellite was lost when it failed to detach from its launch rocket.

== History ==
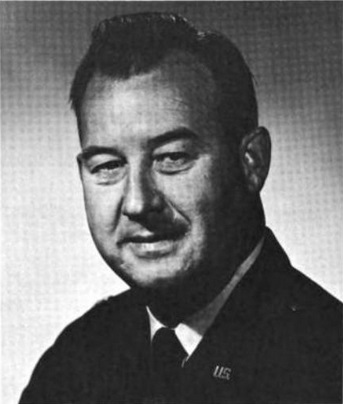
Lt. Col. Clyde Northcott, Jr., OV1 program manager

The Orbiting Vehicle satellite program arose from a US Air Force initiative, begun in the early 1960s, to reduce the expense of space research. Through this initiative, satellites would be standardized to improve reliability and cost-efficiency, and where possible, they would fly on test vehicles or be piggybacked with other satellites. In 1961, the Air Force Office of Aerospace Research (OAR) created the Aerospace Research Support Program (ARSP) to request satellite research proposals and choose mission experiments. The USAF Space and Missiles Organization created their own analog of the ARSP called the Space Experiments Support Program (SESP), which sponsored a greater proportion of technological experiments than the ARSP. Five distinct OV series of standardized satellites were developed under the auspices of these agencies.

The OV1 series was an evolution of the 2.7 m "Scientific Passenger Pods" (SPP), which, starting on 2 October 1961, rode piggyback on suborbital Atlas missile tests and conducted scientific experiments during their short time in space. General Dynamics received a $2 million contract on 13 September 1963 to build a new version of the SPP (called the Atlas Retained Structure (ARS)) that would carry a self-orbiting satellite. Once the Atlas missile and ARS reached apogee, the satellite inside would be deployed and thrust itself into orbit. In addition to the orbital SPP, General Dynamics would create six of these satellites, each to be 3.66 m (12.0 ft) long with a diameter of .762 m (2 ft 6.0 in), able to carry a 136 kg (300 lb) payload into a circular 805 km (500 mi) orbit.

Dubbed "Satellite for Aerospace Research" (SATAR), the series of satellites was originally to be launched from the Eastern Test Range on Atlas missions testing experimental Advanced Ballistic Re-Entry System (ABRES) nosecones. However, in 1964, the Air Force transferred ABRES launches to the Western Test Range causing a year's delay for the program. Moreover, because WTR launches would be into polar orbit as opposed to the low-inclination orbits typical of ETR launches, less mass could be lofted into orbit using the same thrust, and the mass of the SATAR satellites had to be reduced. The OV1 program was managed by Lt. Col. Clyde Northcott, Jr.

The first OV1 satellite to be launched was OV1-1 on January 21, 1965. Though OV1-1's Atlas booster performed properly, the satellite's onboard Altair rocket did not fire, and the probe was lost. OV1-1 was the only satellite launched on an ABRES mission. Starting with OV1-3, launched and lost May 27, 1965, the remaining OV1 satellites all flew on Atlas D and F missiles that had been decommissioned from ICBM duty (except OV1-6, which flew on the Manned Orbiting Laboratory test flight on 2 November 1966). OV1-2, the first successful satellite in the OV1 series, was launched 5 October 1965. OV1-2 pioneered the back-to-back launch configuration under which two OV1 satellites could be carried on the same rocket, although OV1-2 flew alone. This configuration was used in the successful co-launch of OV1-4 and OV1-5 on 30 March 1966.

== Spacecraft design ==
OV1-7 was, like the rest of the OV1 satellite series, 1.387 m (4 ft 6.6 in) long and .69 m (2 ft 3 in) in diameter, consisting of a cylindrical experiment housing capped with flattened cones on both ends containing 5000 solar cells producing 22 watts of power. Unlike the previous OV1 satellites, and setting the precedent for later ones, the solar cells were flat rather than curved. Two .46 m (1 ft 6 in) antennae for transmitting telemetry and receiving commands extended from the sides of the spacecraft. 12 helium-pressurized hydrogen peroxide thrusters provided attitude control. OV1-7 was the first in the series equipped with the Vertistat stabilisation system, developed for the Advanced Research Environmental Test Satellite (ARENTS) that eventually became OV2. Vertistat maintained a satellite's orientation using the small difference in gravitational potential between the central body and the ends of equipment booms.

OV1-7 weighed, with its attached Altair booster, 118 kg (260 lb).

== Experiments ==
OV1-7's experiment package included cosmic ray detectors, molecular oxygen detectors, charged particle measuring devices, a NASA electric field detector, a photometer for measuring nightglow, and a solar X-ray monitor.

== Mission ==
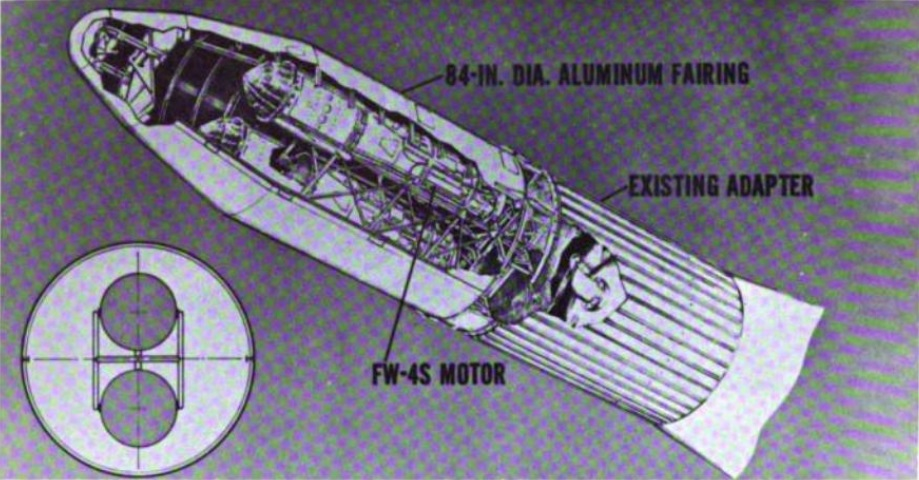
OV1 dual launch schematic

Launched from Vandenberg's 576-B-3 launch pad on 14 July 1966 at 02:10:02 UTC via Atlas D rocket, alongside the passive communications satellite and air drag test balloon, OV1-8, OV1-7 was lost when it failed to eject from its ARS. The small bulge installed to accommodate the new Vertistat system caused too much aerothermal loading, preventing the ARS door from opening quickly enough; OV1-7 collided with the partially open door.

== Legacy and status ==
The co-flying OV1-8 mission was successful. and the Vertistat stabilization system was successfully tested on OV1-10, launched December 1966. The OV1 program ultimately comprised 22 missions, the last flying on 19 September 1971.
