= OV1-2 =

US Air Force satellite

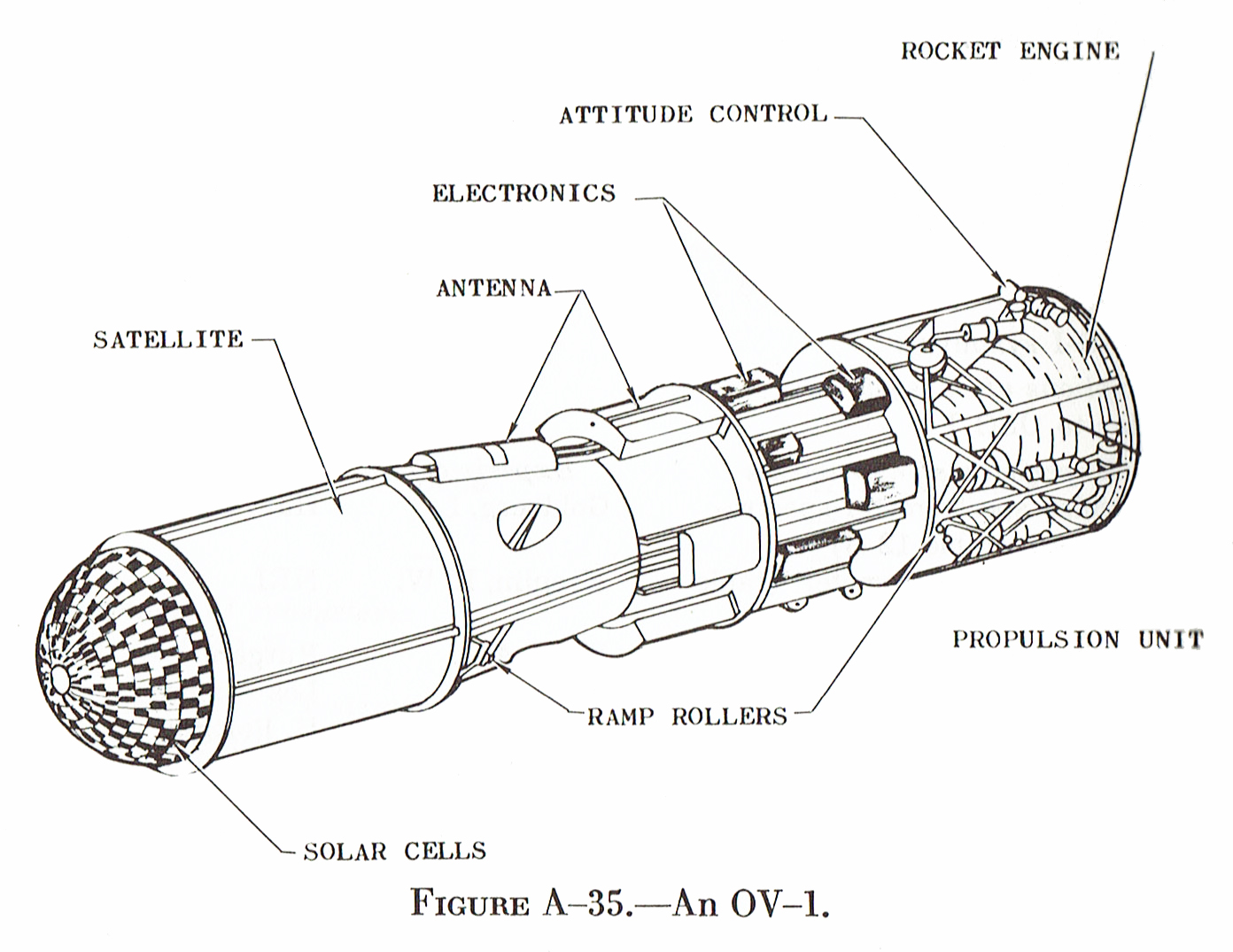
- OV1 series satellite
- Mission type: Earth science
- Operator: USAF
- COSPAR ID: 1965-078A
- SATCAT no.: 01613

Spacecraft properties
- Manufacturer: General Dynamics
- Launch mass: 86 kg (190 lb) with Altair

Start of mission
- Launch date: 5 Oct 1965 09:07:08 UTC
- Rocket: Atlas D
- Launch site: Vandenberg 576-B-3

End of mission
- Last contact: Aug 1967

Orbital parameters
- Regime: Medium Earth Orbit
- Eccentricity: 0.18393
- Perigee altitude: 403.00 km (250.41 mi)
- Apogee altitude: 3,462.00 km (2,151.19 mi)
- Inclination: 144.300°
- Period: 125.58 minutes
- Epoch: 1965-10-05 08:20:00

Orbiting Vehicle 1-2 (also known as OV1-2), launched 5 October 1965, was the third, and first successful, satellite in the OV1 series of the United States Air Force's Orbiting Vehicle program. A radiation measuring satellite designed to conduct research for the planned Manned Orbital Laboratory project, OV1-2 was the first American spacecraft to be placed into orbit on a western (retrograde to Earth's rotation) trajectory. The satellite stopped functioning in April 1967 after a series of technical problems starting two months after launch.

== History ==
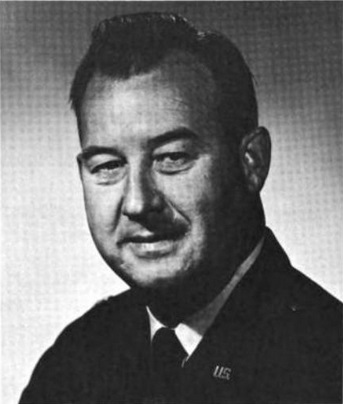
Lt. Col. Clyde Northcott, Jr., OV1 program manager

The Orbiting Vehicle satellite program arose from a US Air Force initiative, begun in the early 1960s, to reduce the expense of space research. Through this initiative, satellites would be standardized to improve reliability and cost-efficiency, and where possible, they would fly on test vehicles or be piggybacked with other satellites. In 1961, the Air Force Office of Aerospace Research (OAR) created the Aerospace Research Support Program (ARSP) to request satellite research proposals and choose mission experiments. The USAF Space and Missiles Organization created their own analog of the ARSP called the Space Experiments Support Program (SESP), which sponsored a greater proportion of technological experiments than the ARSP. Five distinct OV series of standardized satellites were developed under the auspices of these agencies.

The OV1 series was an evolution of the 2.7 m "Scientific Passenger Pods" (SPP), which, starting on 2 October 1961, rode piggyback on suborbital Atlas missile tests and conducted scientific experiments during their short time in space. General Dynamics received a $2 million contract on 13 September 1963 to build a new version of the SPP (called the Atlas Retained Structure (ARS)) that would carry a self-orbiting satellite. Once the Atlas missile and ARS reached apogee, the satellite inside would be deployed and thrust itself into orbit. In addition to the orbital SPP, General Dynamics would create six of these satellites, each to be 3.66 m (12.0 ft) long with a diameter of .762 m (2 ft 6.0 in), able to carry a 136 kg (300 lb) payload into a circular 805 km (500 mi) orbit.

Dubbed "Satellite for Aerospace Research" (SATAR), the series of satellites was originally to be launched from the Eastern Test Range on Atlas missions testing experimental Advanced Ballistic Re-Entry System (ABRES) nosecones. However, in 1964, the Air Force transferred ABRES launches to the Western Test Range causing a year's delay for the program. Moreover, because WTR launches would be into polar orbit as opposed to the low-inclination orbits typical of ETR launches, less mass could be lofted into orbit using the same thrust, and the mass of the SATAR satellites had to be reduced. The OV1 program was managed by Lt. Col. Clyde Northcott, Jr.

The first OV1 satellite to be launched was OV1-1 on January 21, 1965. Though OV1-1's Atlas booster performed properly, the satellite's onboard Altair rocket did not fire, and the probe was lost. OV1-1 was the only satellite launched on an ABRES mission. Starting with OV1-3, launched and lost May 27, 1965, the remaining OV1 satellites all flew on Atlas D and F missiles that had been decommissioned from ICBM duty (except OV1-6, which flew on the Manned Orbiting Laboratory test flight on 2 November 1966).

== Spacecraft design ==
OV1-2 was, like the rest of the OV1 satellite series, 1.387 m (4 ft 6.6 in) long and .69 m (2 ft 3 in) in diameter, consisting of a cylindrical experiment housing capped with flattened cones on both ends containing 5000 solar cells producing 22 watts of power. Two .46 m (1 ft 6 in) antennae for transmitting telemetry and receiving commands extended from the sides of the spacecraft. 12 helium-pressurized hydrogen peroxide thrusters provided attitude control. OV1-2 weighed, with its attached Altair booster, 86 kg (190 lb).

Though the OV1 series was designed to be nose-launched from its carrying rocket, the prior OV1-1 and OV1-3 flights had used side-mounted ARS. Starting with OV1-2, all of the OV1 series was nose-launched (with the exception of the side-launched OV1-86). The two other experiments included an interferometer and another radiometer to map the Earth in the near-infrared spectrum. Also, the OV1-2 flight tested the back-to-back launch configuration under which two OV1 satellites would be carried on the same rocket, although on this mission, the OV1-2 flew alone.

== Experiments ==
OV1-2 carried a six experiment package, sponsored by the Biophysics Group of the Air Force Weapons Laboratory to conduct radiation studies in orbit in support of the Manned Orbital Laboratory project. The data collected would be compared to theoretical radiation doses predicted by computer programs on the ground to verify the utility of their models. The experiment package included two tissue-equivalent ion counters and shielded proton-electron dosimeters, a magnetometer, an X-ray detector, and a proton-electron spectrometer.

== Mission ==
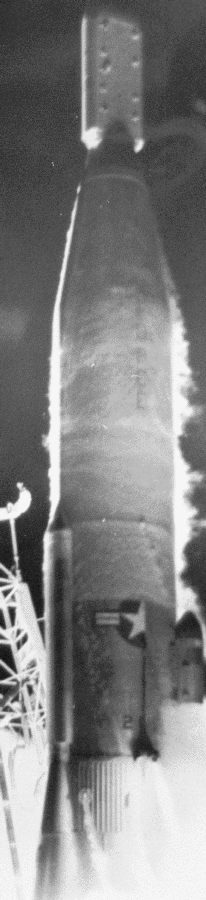
Atlas D with OV1-2

Launched from Vandenberg's 576-B-3 launch pad at 5 October 1965 09:07:08 UTC via Atlas D rocket, OV1-2 was the first OV1 series satellite to mounted in the nose of the launcher rather than the side-mounted ARS, which instead carried a simulated payload for engineering purposes. The satellite was the first to be launched into a retrograde (Western facing) orbit. Upon release from its carrier, OV1-2 tumbled around the Earth, the period of the tumble slowly varying but in the tens of seconds. Though the spacecraft performed normally at first, OV1-2's onboard clock failed on December 1, 1965, this closely followed by the failure of the on-board tape recorder (which allowed data to be stored and transmitted later) on January 13, 1966. Real-time operations were carried out in a limited fashion until total spacecraft failure in April 1967.

== Legacy and status ==
Despite its short lifespan, the data OV1-2 returned on the effectiveness of shielding against radiation doses was significant. OV1-2's radiation data also helped verify various models of the interaction of the Sun and Earth's magnetic fields. This data, along with ones describing the results of similar devices on OV1-12, energized interest in further study of the radial diffusion of electrons and protons in orbit (i.e. the rate at which they migrate to different heights above the Earth).

As of 25 September 2020, OV1-2 is still in orbit, and its position can be tracked on-line. The OV1 program ultimately comprised 22 missions, the last flying on 19 September 1971.
