= OV1-3 =

US Air Force satellite

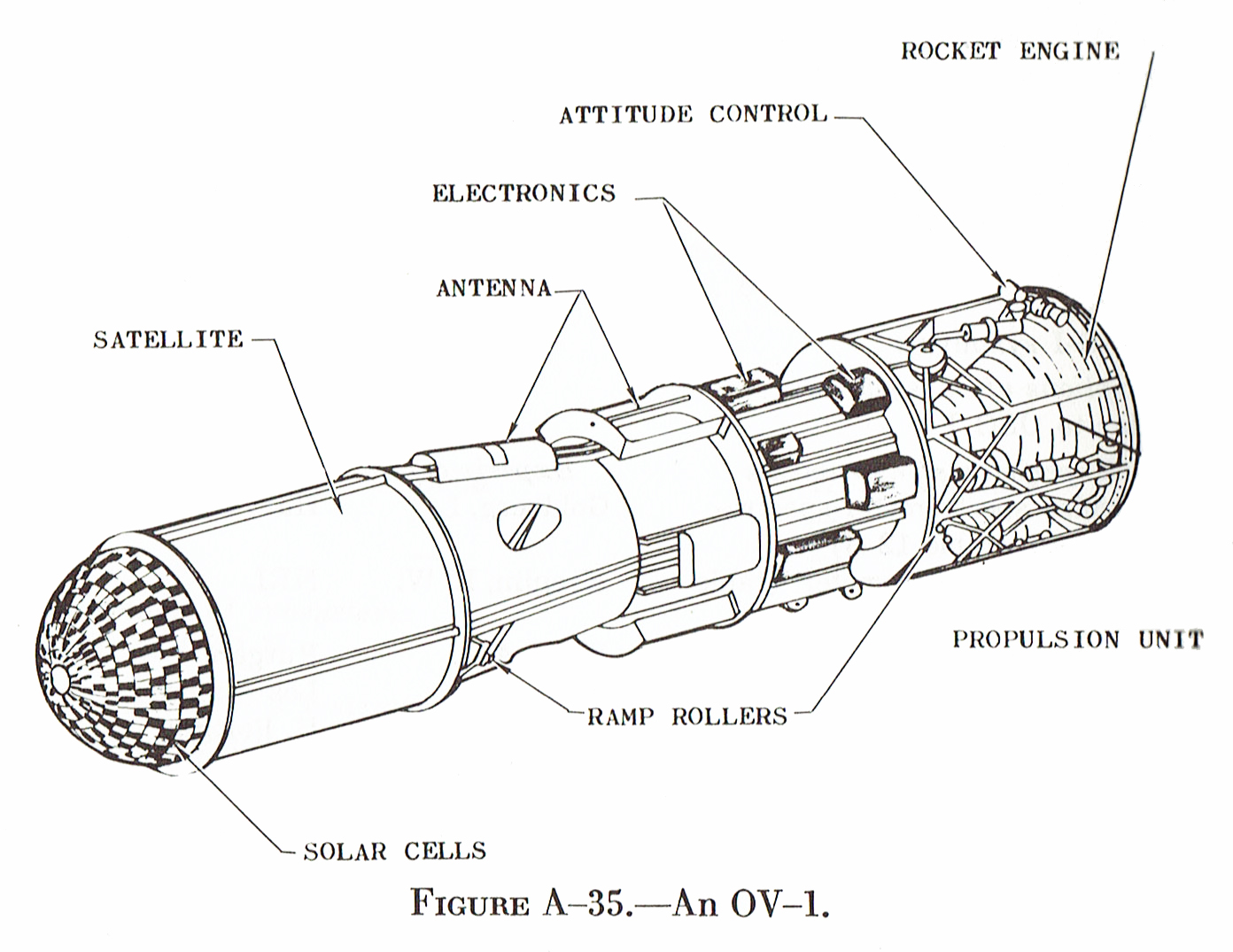
- OV1 series satellite
- Mission type: Life science
- Operator: USAF

Spacecraft properties
- Manufacturer: General Dynamics
- Launch mass: 92 kg (203 lb) with Altair

Start of mission
- Launch date: 27 May 1965 2:54:56 UTC
- Rocket: SM-65D Atlas
- Launch site: Vandenberg 576-B-3

Orbiting Vehicle 1-3 (also known as OV1-3), was the second satellite in the OV1 series of the United States Air Force's Orbiting Vehicle program. OV1-3 was an American life science research satellite designed to measure the effects of orbital radiation on the human body. Launched 28 May 1965, the mission resulted in failure when its Atlas booster exploded two minutes after launch.

== History ==
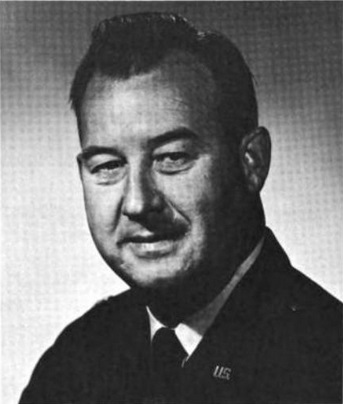
Lt. Col. Clyde Northcott, Jr., OV1 program manager

The Orbiting Vehicle satellite program arose from a US Air Force initiative, begun in the early 1960s, to reduce the expense of space research. Through this initiative, satellites would be standardized to improve reliability and cost-efficiency, and where possible, they would fly on test vehicles or be piggybacked with other satellites. In 1961, the Air Force Office of Aerospace Research (OAR) created the Aerospace Research Support Program (ARSP) to request satellite research proposals and choose mission experiments. The USAF Space and Missiles Organization created their own analog of the ARSP called the Space Experiments Support Program (SESP), which sponsored a greater proportion of technological experiments than the ARSP. Five distinct OV series of standardized satellites were developed under the auspices of these agencies.

The OV1 series was an evolution of the 2.7 m "Scientific Passenger Pods" (SPP), which, starting on 2 October 1961, rode piggyback on suborbital Atlas missile tests and conducted scientific experiments during their short time in space. General Dynamics received a $2 million contract on 13 September 1963 to build a new version of the SPP (called the Atlas Retained Structure (ARS)) that would carry a self-orbiting satellite. Once the Atlas missile and ARS reached apogee, the satellite inside would be deployed and thrust itself into orbit. In addition to the orbital SPP, General Dynamics would create six of these satellites, each to be 3.66 m (12.0 ft) long with a diameter of .762 m (2 ft 6.0 in), able to carry a 136 kg (300 lb) payload into a circular 805 km (500 mi) orbit.

Dubbed "Satellite for Aerospace Research" (SATAR), the series of satellites was originally to be launched from the Eastern Test Range on Atlas missions testing experimental Advanced Ballistic Re-Entry System (ABRES) nosecones. However, in 1964, the Air Force transferred ABRES launches to the Western Test Range causing a year's delay for the program. Moreover, because WTR launches would be into polar orbit as opposed to the low-inclination orbits typical of ETR launches, less mass could be lofted into orbit using the same thrust, and the mass of the SATAR satellites had to be reduced. The OV1 program was managed by Lt. Col. Clyde Northcott, Jr.

The first OV1 satellite to be launched was OV1-1 on 21 January 1965. Though OV1-1's Atlas booster performed properly, the satellite's onboard Altair did not fire, and the probe was lost. OV1-1 was the only satellite launched on an ABRES mission; the remaining OV1 satellites, including OV1-3, flew on Atlas D and F missiles that had been decommissioned from ICBM duty (except OV1-6, which flew on the Manned Orbiting Laboratory test flight on 2 November 1966).

== Spacecraft design ==
OV1-3, like the other satellites in the OV1 series, was 1.387 m (4 ft 6.6 in) long and .69 m (2 ft 3 in) in diameter, and consisted of a cylindrical experiment housing capped with flattened cones on both ends containing 5000 solar cells producing 22 watts of power. Two .46 m (1 ft 6 in) antennas for transmitting telemetry and receiving commands extended from the sides of the spacecraft. 12 helium-pressurized hydrogen peroxide thrusters provided attitude control.

OV1-3 weighed, with its attached Altair booster, 92 kg (203 lb).

Though the OV1 series was designed to be nose-launched from its carrying rocket, on OV1-3, as with the prior OV1-1, the ARS was side-mounted.

== Experiments ==
OV1-3's experiment package was designed to measure the effects of orbital radiation on the human body. The primary experiment was a plastic replica of a human torso containing an ion chamber, a spectrometer, and a linear energy transfer device.

== Mission ==
Launched from Vandenberg's 576-B-3 launch pad at 28 May 1965 2:54:56 UTC, OV1-3 was lost when the Atlas D carrying it, mounting two additional dummy ARS packages for aerodynamic testing purposes, exploded two minutes into the flight.

== Legacy and status ==
The OV1 program ultimately comprised 22 missions, the last flying on 19 September 1971.
