= Pacific Missile Range =

Pacific Missile Range may refer to:

- Pacific Missile Range, a U.S. Navy controlled range from May 1958 to 1 July 1964 based at Point Mugu, California and downrange sites in the central Pacific. Transferred to the U.S.A.F. and renamed Air Force Western Test Range shortened in 1979 to Western Test Range
- The Western Range (USSF), a currently active space range supporting launches from Vandenberg Air Force Base and elsewhere
- Western Launch and Test Range, a missile range active in the 1960s for tracking ballistic missiles
- Pacific Missile Range Facility, located in Hawaii
- Pacific Missile Test Center, the former name of the current Naval Air Warfare Center, Weapons Division at Point Mugu, California
