= OV1-6 =

US Air Force satellite

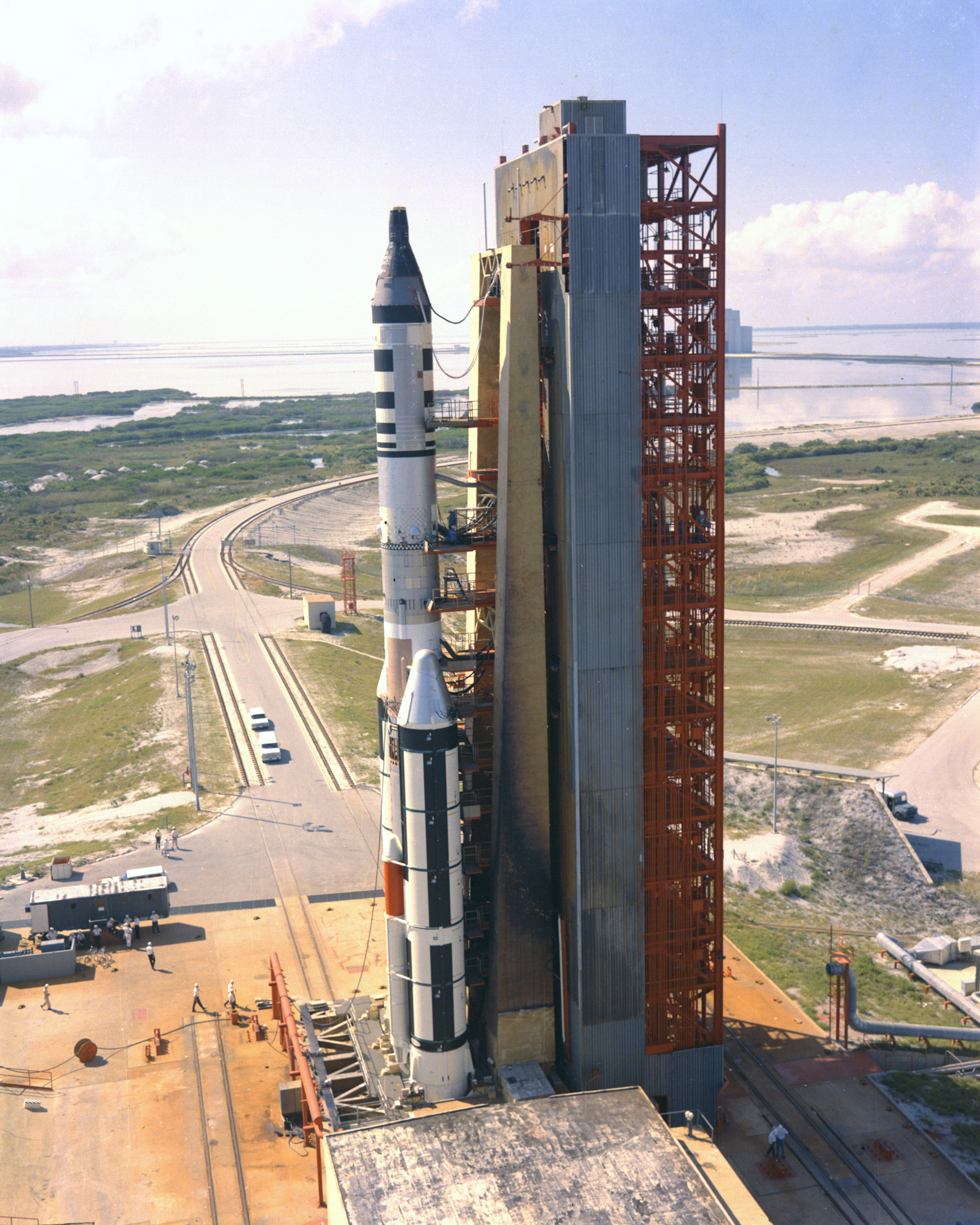
- The Titan IIIC on which OV1-6 was launched (mounted just below the Gemini B)
- Mission type: Earth science
- Operator: USAF
- COSPAR ID: 1966-099C
- SATCAT no.: S02527

Spacecraft properties
- Manufacturer: General Dynamics
- Launch mass: 202 kg (445 lb)

Start of mission
- Launch date: 2 Nov 1966 13:50:42 UTC
- Rocket: Titan IIIC
- Launch site: Cape Canaveral Space Launch Complex 40

Orbital parameters
- Regime: Low Earth Orbit
- Eccentricity: 0.00038
- Perigee altitude: 290.00 km (180.20 mi)
- Apogee altitude: 295.00 km (183.30 mi)
- Inclination: 32.800°
- Period: 90.40 minutes
- Epoch: 1966-02-11 13:55:00 UTC

Orbiting Vehicle 1-6 (also known as OV1-6 and OV1-6S) was launched via Titan IIIC rocket into orbit 2 November 1966 along with two other satellites in the United States Air Force's Orbiting Vehicle series on the first and only Manned Orbiting Laboratory test flight. The eighth satellite in the OV1 series to be launched, OV1-6 was designed to release a number of inflatable spheres, which would then be used in classified tracking experiments conducted on the ground. It is uncertain whether or not the satellite successfully released any of its spheres. OV1-6 reentered the Earth's atmosphere on 31 December 1966.

== History ==
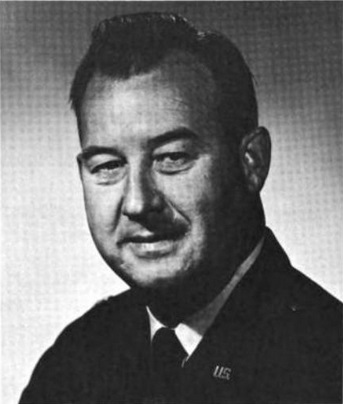
Lt. Col. Clyde Northcott, Jr., OV1 program manager

The Orbiting Vehicle satellite program arose from a US Air Force initiative, begun in the early 1960s, to reduce the expense of space research. Through this initiative, satellites would be standardized to improve reliability and cost-efficiency, and where possible, they would fly on test vehicles or be piggybacked with other satellites. In 1961, the Air Force Office of Aerospace Research (OAR) created the Aerospace Research Support Program (ARSP) to request satellite research proposals and choose mission experiments. The USAF Space and Missiles Organization created their own analog of the ARSP called the Space Experiments Support Program (SESP), which sponsored a greater proportion of technological experiments than the ARSP. Five distinct OV series of standardized satellites were developed under the auspices of these agencies.

The OV1 series was an evolution of the 2.7 m "Scientific Passenger Pods" (SPP), which, starting on 2 October 1961, rode piggyback on suborbital Atlas missile tests and conducted scientific experiments during their short time in space. General Dynamics received a $2 million contract on 13 September 1963 to build a new version of the SPP (called the Atlas Retained Structure (ARS)) that would carry a self-orbiting satellite. Once the Atlas missile and ARS reached apogee, the satellite inside would be deployed and thrust itself into orbit. In addition to the orbital SPP, General Dynamics would create six of these satellites, each to be 3.66 m (12.0 ft) long with a diameter of .762 m (2 ft 6.0 in), able to carry a 136 kg (300 lb) payload into a circular 805 km (500 mi) orbit.

Dubbed "Satellite for Aerospace Research" (SATAR), the series of satellites was originally to be launched from the Eastern Test Range on Atlas missions testing experimental Advanced Ballistic Re-Entry System (ABRES) nosecones. However, in 1964, the Air Force transferred ABRES launches to the Western Test Range causing a year's delay for the program. Moreover, because WTR launches would be into polar orbit as opposed to the low-inclination orbits typical of ETR launches, less mass could be lofted into orbit using the same thrust, and the mass of the SATAR satellites had to be reduced. The OV1 program was managed by Lt. Col. Clyde Northcott, Jr.

Prior to OV1-6, there had been seven satellites in the OV1 series, the first launched January 21, 1965, all on Atlas missiles. OV1-6 was programmed for launch out of sequence (after the 14 July 1966 launch of OV1-7 and OV1-8) so that it could be carried on the Titan IIIC tasked for the Manned Orbiting Laboratory test flight.

== Spacecraft design ==
OV1-6, like the rest of the OV1 satellite series, consisted of a cylindrical experiment housing capped with flattened cones on both ends containing 5000 solar cells producing 22 watts of power. Two .46 m (1 ft 6 in) antennae for transmitting telemetry and receiving commands extended from the sides of the spacecraft. 12 helium-pressurized hydrogen peroxide thrusters provided attitude control. Slightly longer than the standard OV1 satellite, it was 1.7 m (5 ft 7 in) in length.

OV1-6 weighed 202 kg (445 lb). It was mounted just behind the Gemini B adapter section on the Titan IIIC rocket. Because the Titan could deliver, by itself, the OV1-6 to its intended orbit, the Altair rocket propulsion unit was removed from the satellite prior to launch.

== Experiments ==
In contrast to prior OV1 satellites, which with the exception of the unique balloon satellite OV1-8, carried onboard instruments for measuring radiation, OV1-6 carried several inflatable spheres. These were to be deployed as optical targets for ground tracking experiments conducted by Wright Laboratory at Wright-Patterson Air Force Base. The satellite's purpose was initially classified, with the public story that OV1-6 carried several technical experiments including a zero-gravity propellant gauging system.

== Mission ==
Launched from Cape Canaveral Space Launch Complex 40 on 2 November 1966 at 13:50:42 UTC via Titan IIIC along with a simulated Manned Orbiting Laboratory, a boilerplate Gemini B, and the communications test satellites OV4-1T and OV4-1R, OV1-6 was released after the Titan's Transtage had fired twice to reach the planned 300 km (190 mi) orbit.

It is uncertain whether OV1-6 released its target spheres, although at least two additional objects associated with the launch were identified.

== Legacy and status ==
OV1-6 reentered the Earth's atmosphere on 31 December 1966. OV1-6's unused Altair 2 propulsion module was later used, along with OV1-8's unused satellite body, in the construction of OV1-86, launched 27 July 1967. The OV1 program ultimately comprised 22 missions, the last flying on 19 September 1971.
