= OV1-1 =

US Air Force satellite

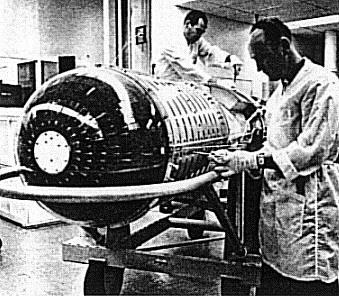
- OV1-1 satellite
- Mission type: Earth science
- Operator: USAF
- COSPAR ID: 1965-F01

Spacecraft properties
- Manufacturer: General Dynamics
- Launch mass: 100 lb (45 kg) (satellite); 189.2 lb (85.8 kg) with Altair

Start of mission
- Launch date: 21 January 1965 21:34:54 UTC
- Rocket: SM-65D Atlas
- Launch site: Vandenberg 576-B-3

Orbiting Vehicle 1-1 (COSPAR ID: 1965-F01, also known as OV1-1), was the first satellite in the OV1 series of the United States Air Force's Orbiting Vehicle program. OV1-1 was an American Earth science research satellite designed to measure radiation, micrometeoroid density, and magnetic fields in orbit. Launched 21 January 1965, the mission resulted in failure when, after a successful launch of its Atlas booster, OV1-1's onboard Altair motor failed to fire.

== History ==
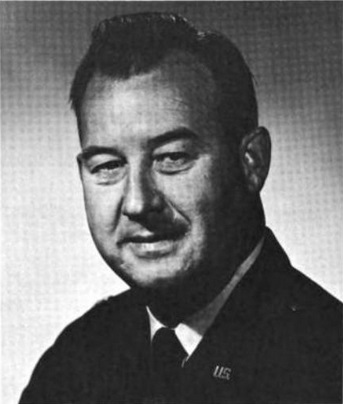
Lt. Col. Clyde Northcott, Jr., OV1 program manager

The Orbiting Vehicle satellite program arose from a US Air Force initiative, begun in the early 1960s, to reduce the expense of space research. Through this initiative, satellites would be standardized to improve reliability and cost-efficiency, and where possible, they would fly on test vehicles or be piggybacked with other satellites. In 1961, the Air Force Office of Aerospace Research (OAR) created the Aerospace Research Support Program (ARSP) to request satellite research proposals and choose mission experiments. The USAF Space and Missiles Organization created their own analog of the ARSP called the Space Experiments Support Program (SESP), which sponsored a greater proportion of technological experiments than the ARSP. Five distinct OV series of standardized satellites were developed under the auspices of these agencies.

The OV1 series was an evolution of the 2.7 m "Scientific Passenger Pods" (SPP), which, starting on 2 October 1961, rode piggyback on suborbital Atlas missile tests and conducted scientific experiments during their short time in space. General Dynamics received a $2 million contract on 13 September 1963 to build a new version of the SPP (called the Atlas Retained Structure (ARS)) that would carry a self-orbiting satellite. Once the Atlas missile and ARS reached apogee, the satellite inside would be deployed and thrust itself into orbit. In addition to the orbital SPP, General Dynamics would create six of these satellites, each to be 3.66 m (12.0 ft) long with a diameter of .762 m (2 ft 6.0 in), able to carry a 136 kg (300 lb) payload into a circular 805 km (500 mi) orbit.

Dubbed "Satellite for Aerospace Research" (SATAR), the series of satellites was originally to be launched from the Eastern Test Range on Atlas missions testing experimental Advanced Ballistic Re-Entry System (ABRES) nosecones. However, in 1964, the Air Force transferred ABRES launches to the Western Test Range causing a year's delay for the program. Moreover, because WTR launches would be into polar orbit as opposed to the low-inclination orbits typical of ETR launches, less mass could be lofted into orbit using the same thrust, and the mass of the SATAR satellites had to be reduced. The OV1 program was managed by Lt. Col. Clyde Northcott, Jr.

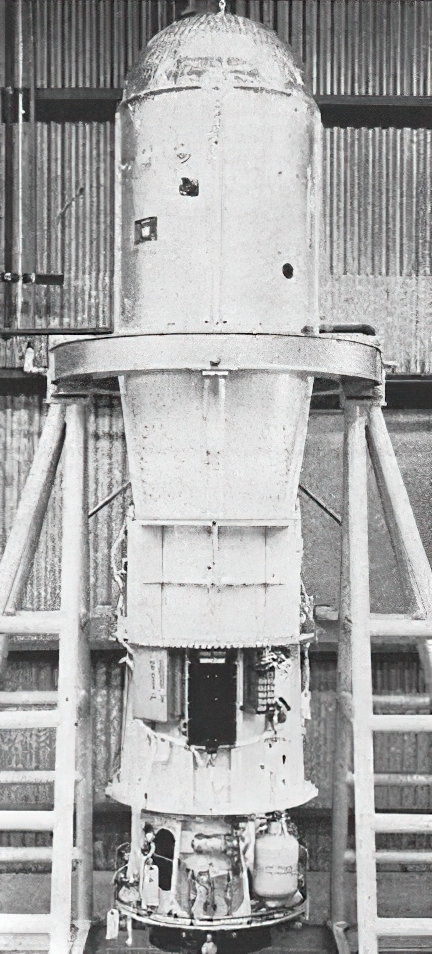
OV1-1 with solid motor undergoing balance test at General Dynamics/Astronautics in San Diego

== Spacecraft design ==
OV1-1, like the other satellites in the OV1 series, was 1.387 m (4 ft 6.6 in) long and .69 m (2 ft 3 in) in diameter, and consisted of a cylindrical experiment housing capped with flattened cones on both ends containing 5000 solar cells (2500 on each end) producing 22 watts of power. Two .46 m (1 ft 6 in) antennas for transmitting telemetry and receiving commands extended from the sides of the spacecraft. 12 helium-pressurized hydrogen peroxide RCS thrusters provided attitude control. Spacecraft systems, including telemetry, command systems, and data recording and playback were located in the satellite's end-caps. An onboard timer would shut down the satellite after 180 days of operation.

OV1-1 weighed 100 lb (45 kg), 189.2 lb (85.8 kg) with its Altair booster.

Though the OV1 series was designed to be nose-launched from its carrying rocket, on OV1-1, the ARS was side-mounted.

== Experiments ==
170,000 cubic centimetres (6.0 cu ft) of space in the cylindrical portion of the spacecraft was allocated to a seven experiment package designed to measure micrometeoroid density, cosmic radio noise, electron density variations, magnetic fields, proton concentrations, and Earth-based infrared and ultraviolet emissions.

== Mission ==
Launched from Vandenberg's 576-B-3 launch pad at 21 January 1965 21:34:54 UTC, OV1-1 (then called Aerospace Research Vehicle (ARV)) was the first satellite launched into a western-facing orbit. Five minutes after launch, the ARS was designed to open so that the OV satellite could propel itself out at Atlas apogee. While the Atlas D carrying OV1-1 flew without incident, OV1-1's Altair booster did not fire at apogee, and the spacecraft remained stranded in its ARS, returning no data.

== Legacy and status ==
The OV1 program ultimately comprised 22 missions, the last flying on 19 September 1971.
