= Altair (rocket stage) =

Solid-fuel rocket

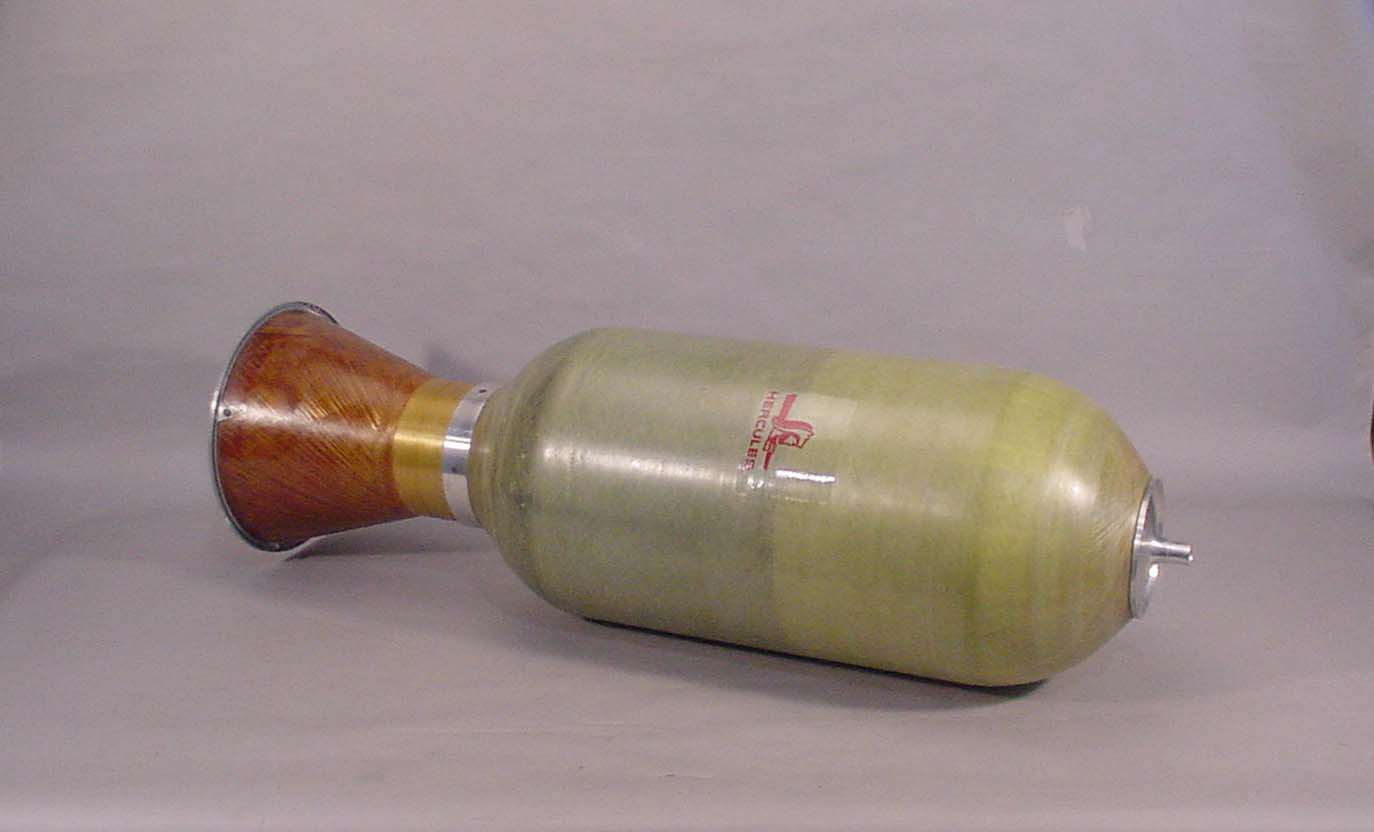
Altair X248-A2 rocket stage

The Altair was a solid-fuel rocket with a filament-wound fibre-reinforced epoxy resin casing, initially developed for use as the third stage of Vanguard rockets in 1959. It was manufactured by Allegany Ballistics Laboratory (ABL) as the X-248. It was also sometimes called the Burner 1.

== Altair ==
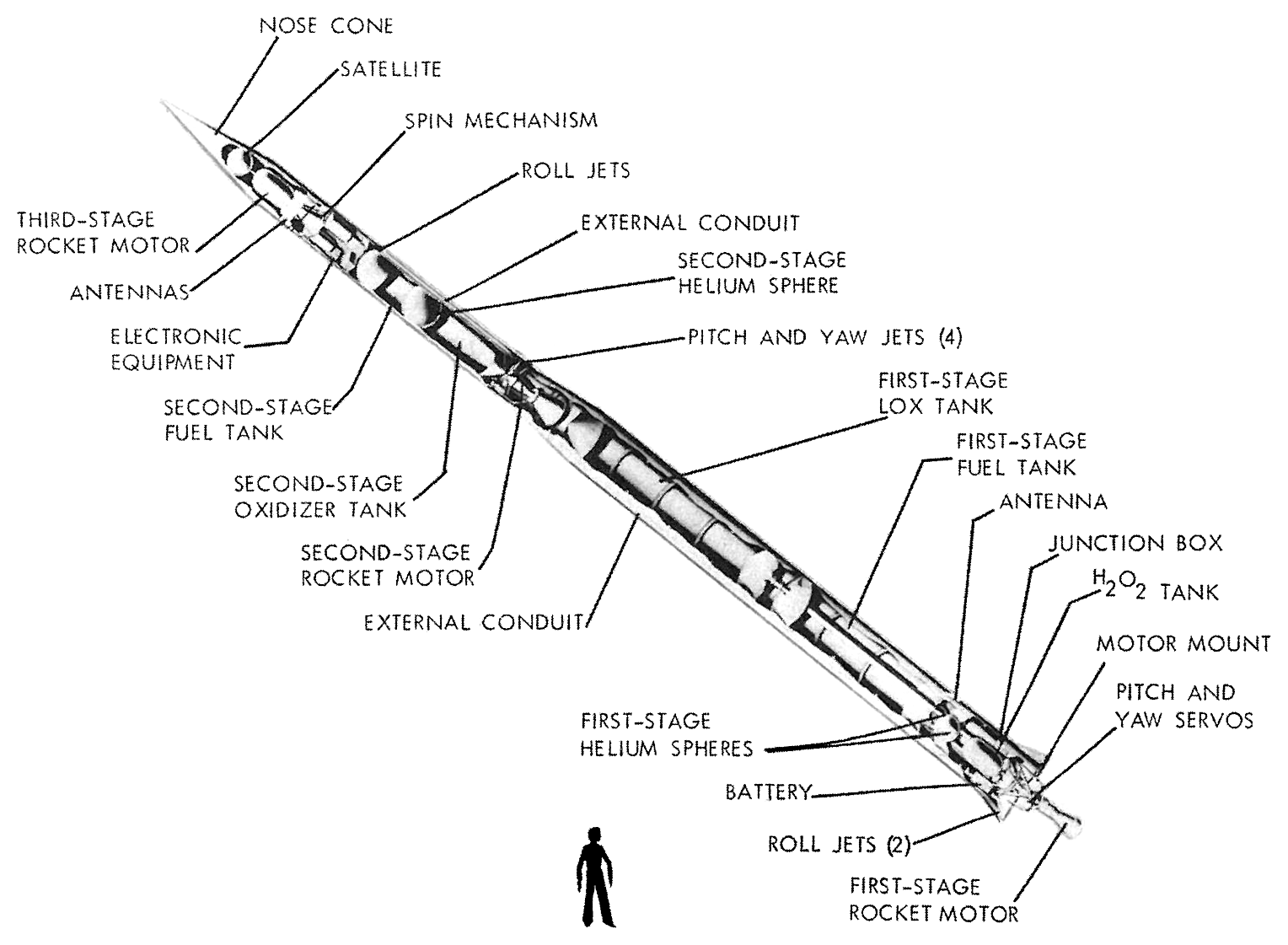
Vanguard rocket cutaway view - Altair is labeled as "third-stage rocket motor".

The X-248 was one of two third-stage designs used during Project Vanguard. Early launches used a stage developed by the Grand Central Rocket Company, but the last used the X-248 which enabled the Vanguard to launch more massive payload.

The X-248 was used as the second stage of some early Thor flights. These vehicles were designated "Thor-LV2D Burner-1".

Altairs were used as the third stage of early Delta rockets and as the second stage of Project Shotput.

Diagram showing Altair as 4th stage of the Scout B rocket.

The fourth stage of the Scout-X rocket used the "Altair-1A" stage, powered by a X-248A engine.

This initial variant could produce 13.7 kN (3,070 lbf) of thrust, and had a diameter of 43.18 cm (17.00 in).

== Altair 2 ==
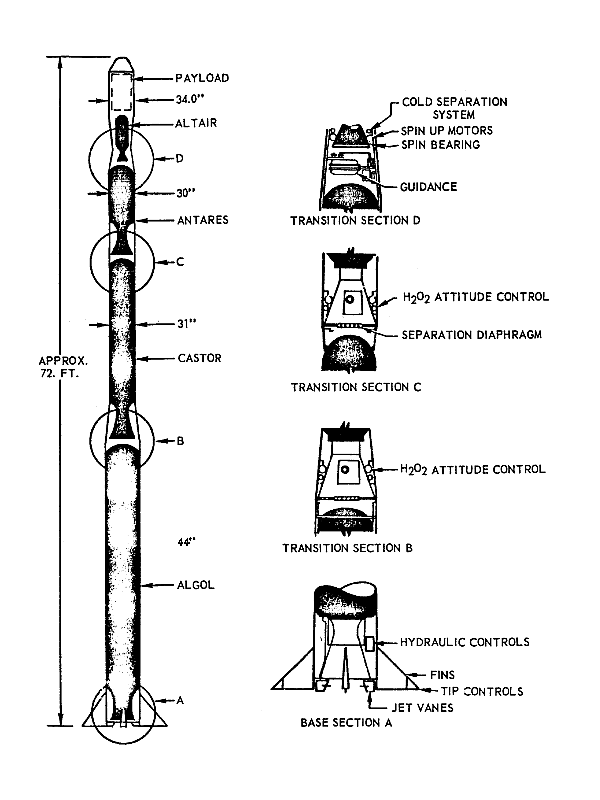
Scout-A diagram showing Altair as 4th stage.

The Altair 2 (X-258) Thiokol (Star 25, TE-M-184-3) solid rocket engine first flew in 1963 and was the kick stage motor for Delta D, Scout A, Scout X-4, and Atlas-D OV1 as part of the Orbiting Vehicle satellites. It was retired in 1973.

== Altair 3 ==
The Altair 3 (FW-4S) solid rocket engine first flew in 1968 and was used on the Atlas-E/F OV1 as part of the OV1 upper stage. It was also used as the second stage of the ASM-135 ASAT anti-satellite missile. It was proposed as the fourth stage for Advanced Scout. The FW-4S motor is similar to Thiokol Star 20 (TE-M-640), and both are designated by NASA as Altair IIIA.

== See also ==
- Algol (rocket stage)
- Castor (rocket stage)
