= OPS 0855 =

American boilerplate Manned Orbital Laboratory spacecraft

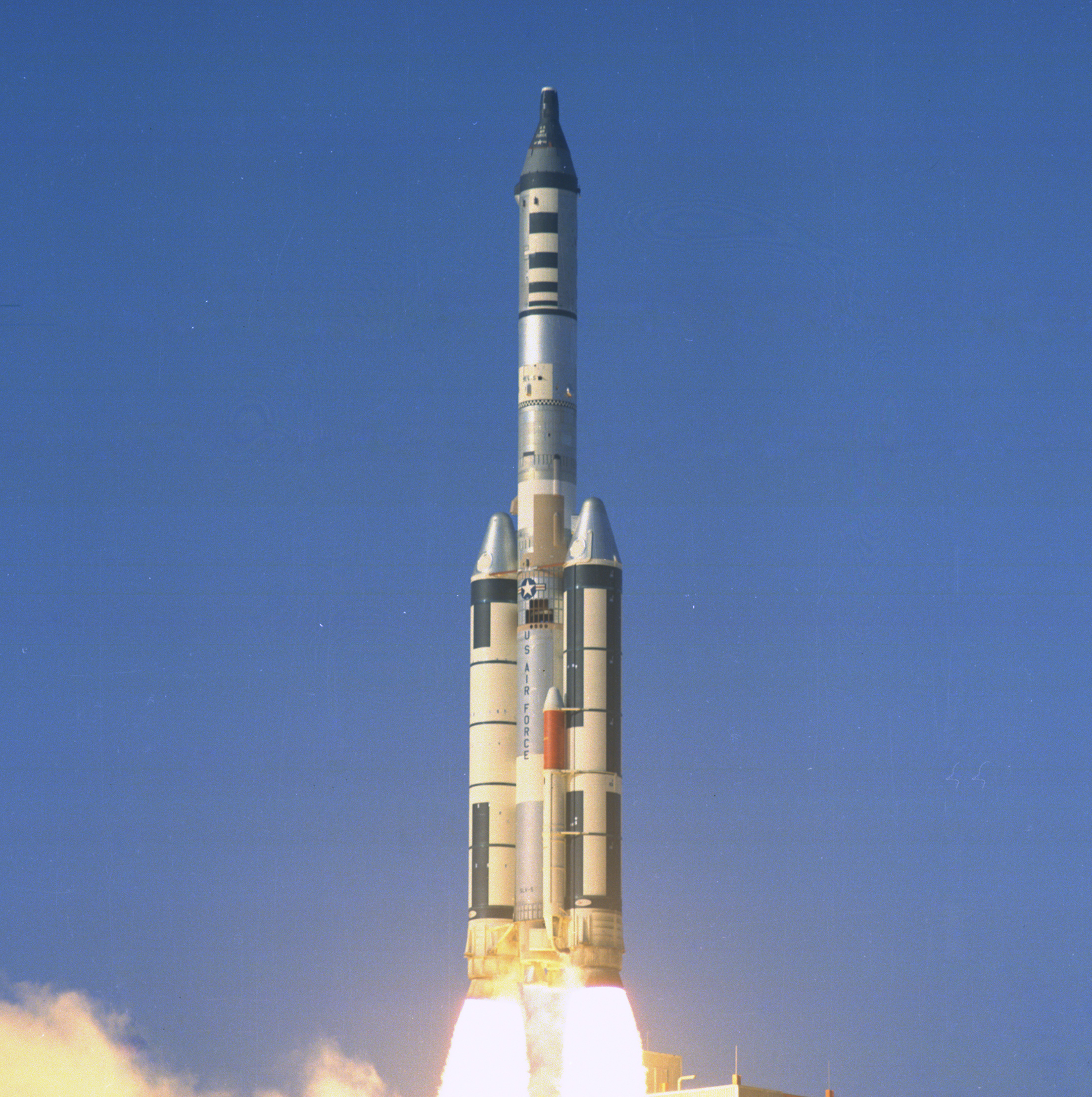
- Launch of OPS 0855 with OV4-1, OV1-6 and Gemini B
- Mission type: Technology
- Operator: US Air Force
- COSPAR ID: 1966-099A
- SATCAT no.: 02524
- Mission duration: Planned: 75 days Achieved: 30 days

Spacecraft properties
- Manufacturer: Martin Marietta
- Launch mass: 9,680 kilograms (21,340 lb)

Start of mission
- Launch date: 3 November 1966, 13:50 UTC
- Rocket: Titan IIIC
- Launch site: Cape Canaveral LC-40

End of mission
- Last contact: 3 December 1966
- Decay date: 9 January 1967

Orbital parameters
- Reference system: Geocentric
- Regime: Low Earth
- Perigee altitude: 298 kilometers (185 mi)
- Apogee altitude: 305 kilometers (190 mi)
- Inclination: 32.82 degrees

OPS 0855, also designated OV4-3, was an American boilerplate Manned Orbiting Laboratory spacecraft launched in 1966. It was flown to demonstrate the launch configuration for future MOL missions. A number of research payloads, designated Manifold, were carried on board, which were intended to operate for 75 days. However, the spacecraft ceased operations after just 30 days. It was built from a decommissioned HGM-25A Titan I first stage oxidizer tank, bolted to a Transtage. It was part of the MOL and Orbiting Vehicle projects.

== History ==
The Manifold experimental package consisted of two micrometeoroid detection payloads, a transmitter beacon designated ORBIS-Low, a cell growth experiment, a prototype hydrogen fuel cell, a thermal control experiment, a propellant transfer and monitoring system to investigate fluid dynamics in zero gravity, a prototype attitude control system, an experiment to investigate the reflection of light in space, and an experiment into heat transfer. The spacecraft was painted to allow it to be used as a target for an optical tracking and observation experiment from the ground.

OPS 0855 was the primary payload of Titan IIIC 3C-9, The Gemini B prototype capsule, known as Gemini SC-2, was flown on the same rocket, and was released onto a suborbital trajectory during launch. The adaptor connecting the Gemini spacecraft to OPS 0855 contained three additional spacecraft, two OV4-1 satellites, and OV1-6. These were released into low Earth orbit.

OPS 0855 entered an orbit with an apogee of 305 kilometres (190 mi), a perigee of 298 kilometres (185 mi), and 32.82 degrees of inclination. It received the COSPAR International Designator 1966-099A, and remained in orbit until its decay on 9 January 1967. No further MOL missions were flown following the cancellation of the project in June 1969.
