= Vandenberg Launch Complex 576 =

United States rocket launch pads

Coordinates: 34°44′22″N 120°37′09″W

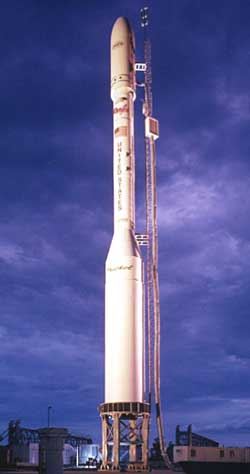
Taurus rocket on LC-576E

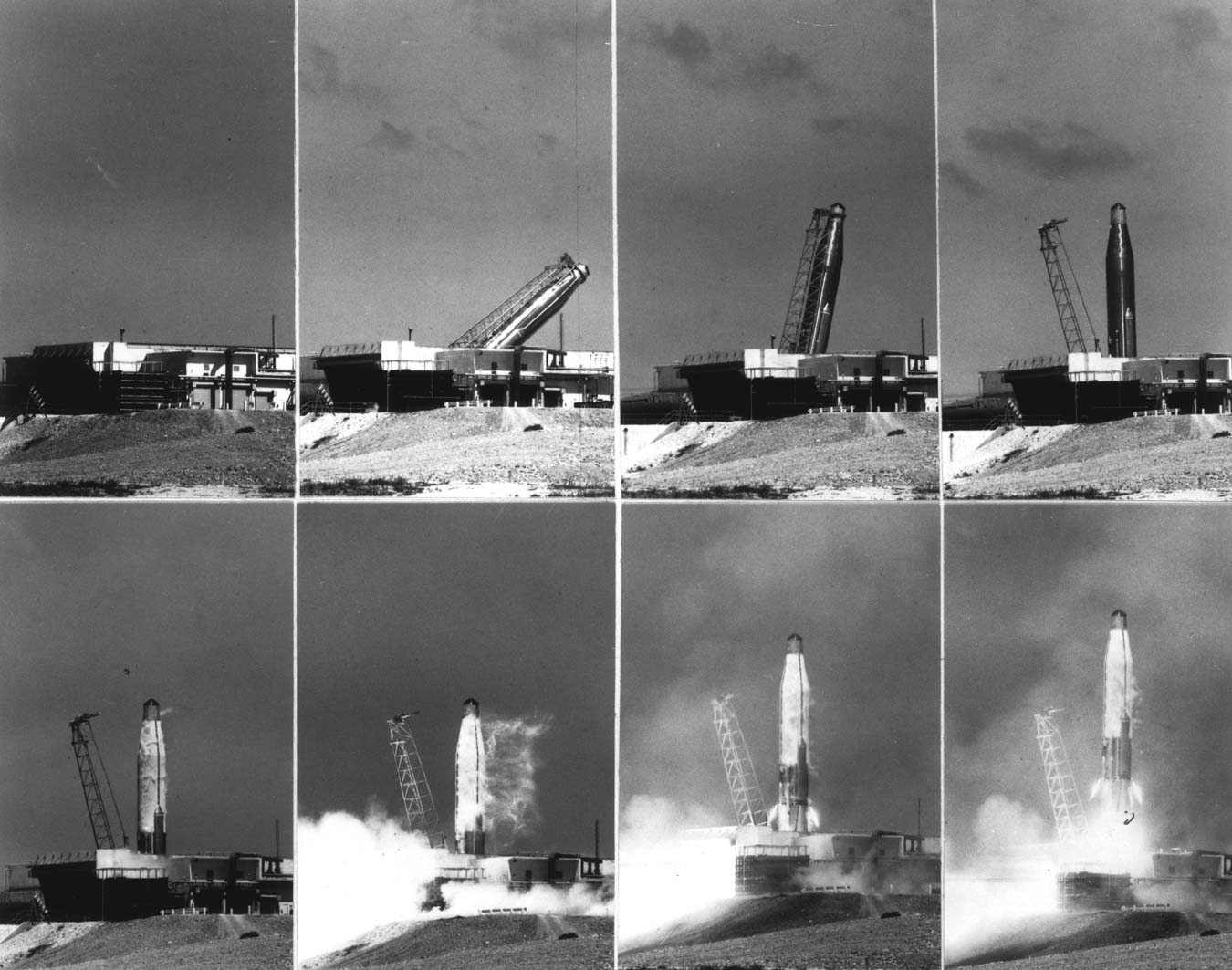
Atlas ICBM sequence images of missile erection, fueling, and launch at Vandenberg AFB, California.

Launch Complex 576 is a group of rocket launch pads at Vandenberg Space Force Base. The pads were used from 1959 until 1971 to launch SM-65 Atlas missiles. The site was also known as Complex ABRES. Pads in Area 576 include 576A-1, 576A-2 and 576A-3, 576B-1, 576B-2 and 576B-3, 576-C, 576-D, 576-E, OSTF-1 and OSTF-2.

The first operational launch of an Atlas missile by the Strategic Air Command was conducted from 576A-2 by the 576th Strategic Missile Squadron on 9 September 1959. It impacted 4,480 nautical miles (8,300 km) away, near Wake Island.

The first Atlas F launch at Vandenberg took place from 576-E on 1 August 1962. Orbital Sciences Corporation now launches their Taurus rockets from 576-E. The LC 576E is also a candidate site for launches of Kinetic Energy Interceptor (KEI) boosters. The USAF and Missile Defense Agency anticipate a minimum of three KEI launches per year from 2009 to at least 2012.

== 576A ==
The first pad in the complex, 576A-2, hosted the inaugural Atlas launch from the West Coast when Missile 12D flew a successful 1,800 kilometres (1,100 mi) arc across the Pacific Ocean on 9 September 1959. The site was not used again until 1965 when it was converted for the Atlas F and hosted 13 ABRES and OV-1 launches.

The second pad in the complex, 576A-3, began operation in 1960. It hosted reentry vehicle and Nike-Zeus target tests on the Atlas D and Atlas F through 1974.

Pad 576A-1 was severely damaged when Atlas 19D exploded on it during a fuel loading exercise on 5 March 1960. It did not enter regular use as a launching facility until 1962 when it hosted Atlas D reentry vehicle and Nike-Zeus target tests. In 1967, the pad was converted for the Atlas F and hosted more reentry vehicle tests until being decommissioned in 1974. One space launch took place from 576A-1, the launch of RADSAT in 1972.

== 576B ==
576B's three pads were coffins sites for Atlas ICBM tests. The facility was the source of some trouble in the beginning due to a construction error as one umbilical on the silo was installed incorrectly. After four failed launches from 576B, it was discovered that the umbilical was releasing prematurely at liftoff when it still had live electrical current in it, which shorted out components in the missiles. Repairs were made during early 1961 and launches resumed that May 1961.

576B-1 began operation in 1960 and hosted five missile tests until 1965, when it hosted Nike-Zeus and reentry vehicle tests. The pad was decommissioned in 1966.

576B-2 hosted Atlas D ICBM tests from 1960 to 1963, then it supported Nike-Zeus and reentry vehicle tests. The pad was decommissioned in 1967.

576B-3 hosted Atlas D ICBM tests from 1960 to 1963, then it supported reentry vehicle and OV-1 satellite launches. The pad was decommissioned in 1967.

== 576C ==
Pad 576C was only used for three Atlas E tests in 1963.

== 576D ==
Pad 576D was only used for two Atlas F tests in 1963-1964.

== 576E ==
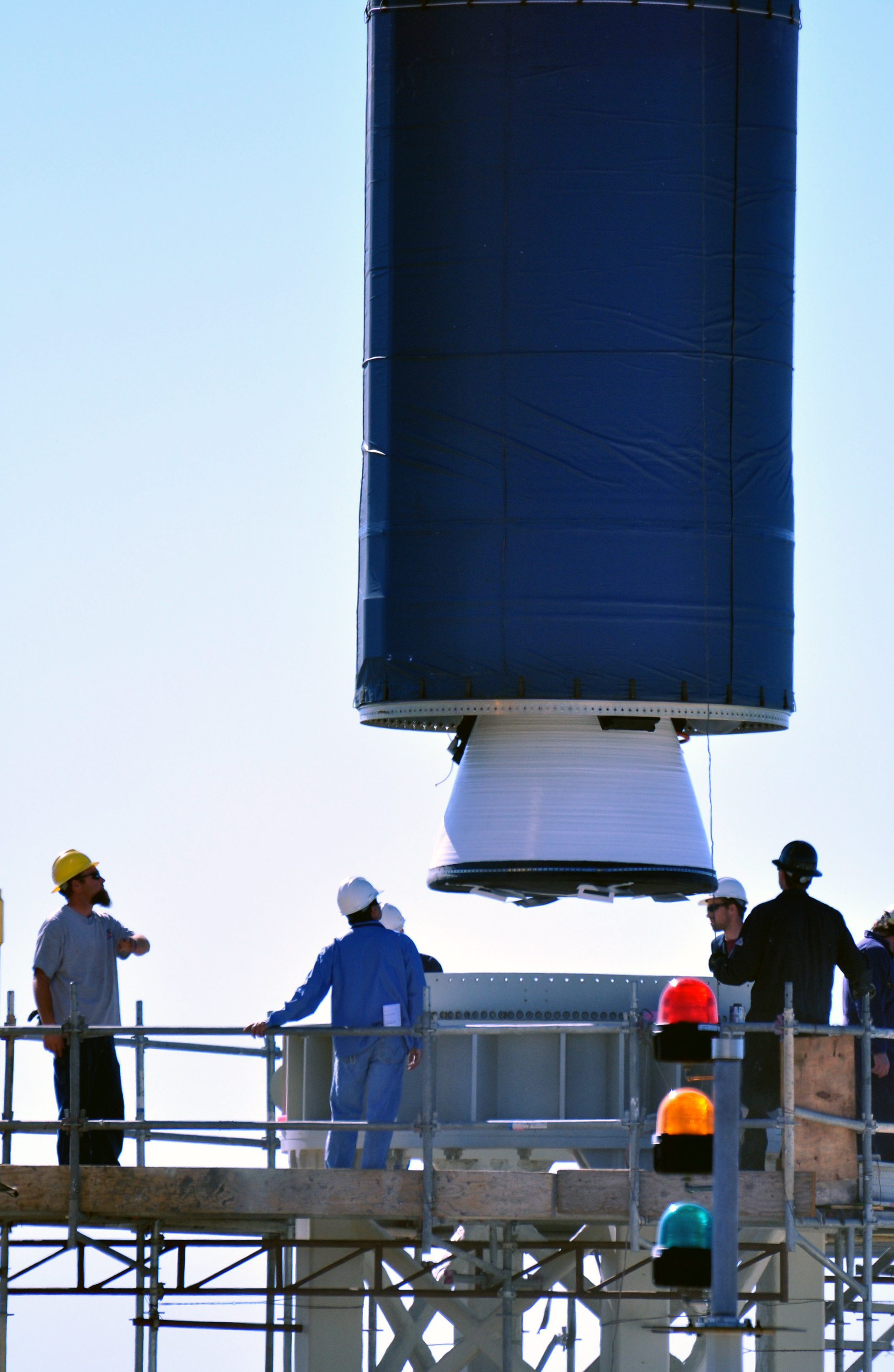
At complex 576E, a crane lifts Stage 0 of the Taurus XL launch vehicle for the Orbiting Carbon Observatory from its transporter.

Pad 576E was used for four Atlas F tests in 1962-1964. Since 1994, the facility was revived for Minotaur-C and Taurus launches.
