= Eastern Range =

American rocket range

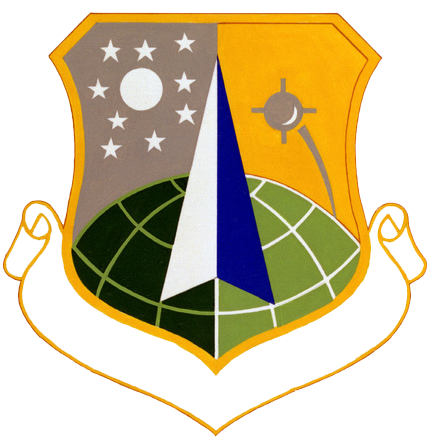
- Emblem of the Eastern Test Range
- Active: 1949–present
- Country: United States
- Branch: United States Space Force

The Eastern Range (ER) is an American rocket range (Spaceport) that supports missile and rocket launches from the two major launch heads located at Cape Canaveral Space Force Station and the Kennedy Space Center (KSC), Florida. The range has also supported Ariane launches from the Guiana Space Centre as well as launches from the Wallops Flight Facility and other lead ranges. The range also uses instrumentation operated by NASA at Wallops and KSC.

The range can support launches between 37° and 114° azimuth. The headquarters of the range is now the Space Launch Delta 45 at Patrick Space Force Base.

== History ==
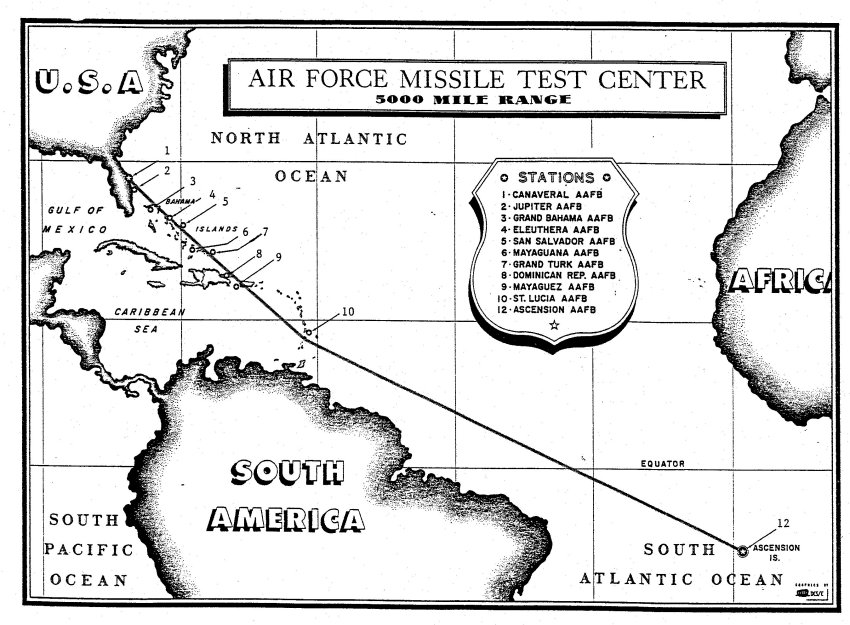
Eastern Test Range, circa 1957

The history of the Eastern Range began on 18 October 1940, with the activation of the Naval Air Station Banana River which primarily supported antisubmarine patrol plane squadrons equipped with the PBY Catalina and PBM Mariner during World War II. NAS Banana River was deactivated and put into a caretaker status on 1 September 1947.

Launches of captured German V-2 rockets had been ongoing since the end of World War II at White Sands Proving Grounds in New Mexico, but it became clear that a much longer range away from heavily populated areas would be needed. The Joint Research and Development Board established the Committee on the Long Range Proving Ground in October 1946 to study locations for such a range, with three potential sites emerging: along the northern coast of Washington state with a range along the Aleutian Islands; El Centro, California, with a range along the Baja California Peninsula; and NAS Banana River with a launch site at Cape Canaveral and a range over the Bahamas and into the Atlantic Ocean. The Washington site was quickly discarded due to difficulties with support due to cold weather and remoteness. El Centro was put forth as the primary choice (due to being close to missile manufacturers) with the Cape as second choice. However, the El Centro site had to be abandoned after a wayward V-2 missile from White Sands crashed into a cemetery in Juarez, Mexico, leading to then Mexican President Miguel Alemán Valdés refusing to allow missiles to overfly Baja.

The U.S. Navy transferred NAS Banana River to the U.S. Air Force on 1 September 1948, and it remained on standby status. On 11 May 1949, President Truman signed Public Law 60 which established the Joint Long Range Proving Ground Base. On 10 June 1949, the Banana River Naval Air Station was redesignated the Joint Long Range Proving Ground Base and Advance Headquarters, Joint Long Range Proving Ground and the Air Force Division, Joint Long Range Proving Ground was established. On 16 May 1950 and 17 May 1950, range and base dropped the "Joint" in their names due to a DoD decision earlier in the year to put the range exclusively under U. S. Air Force jurisdiction. On 24 July 1950, Bumper #8 became the first missile to launch from the Cape Canaveral.

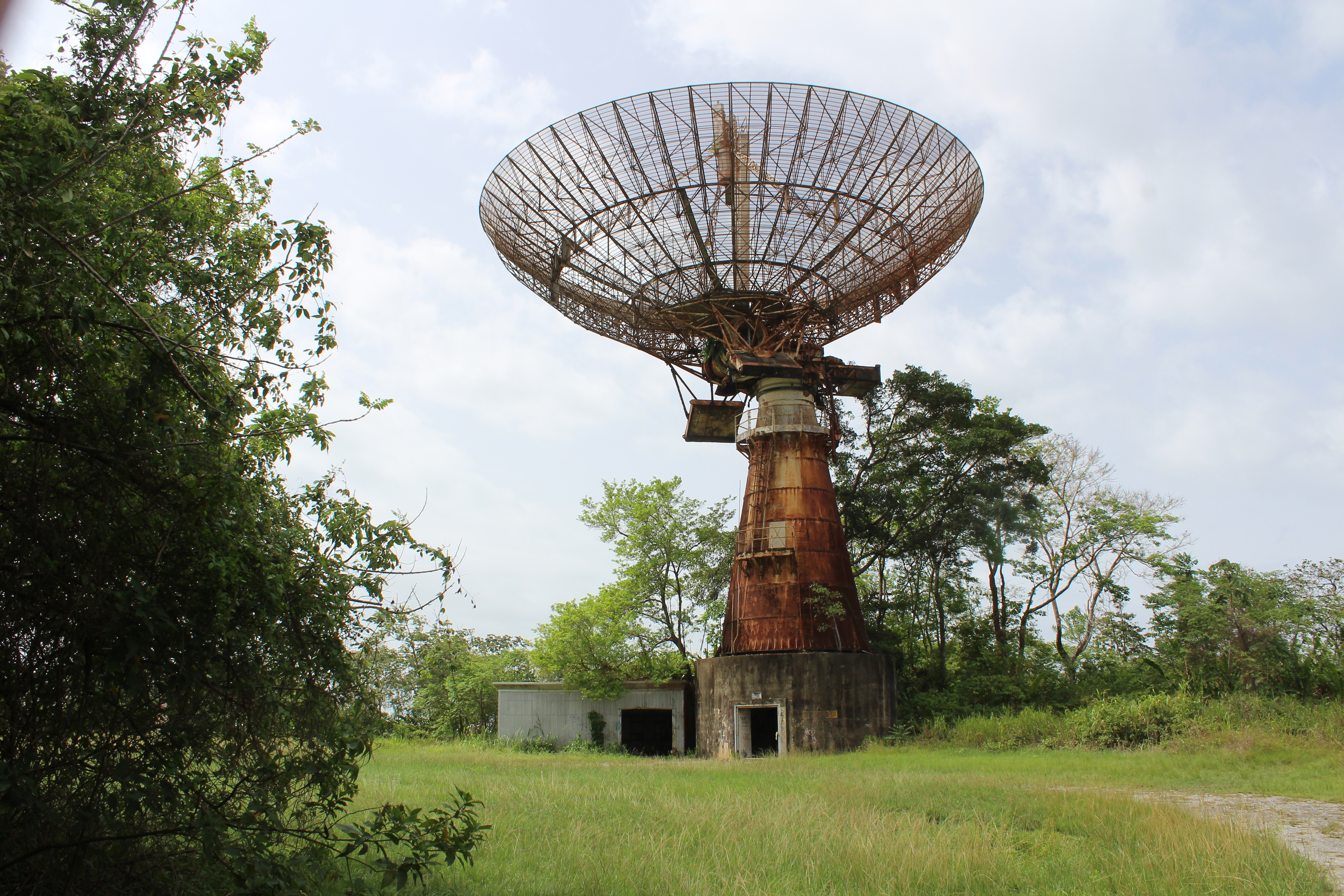
A former tracking station antenna located in Trinidad.

The Long Range Proving Ground Base was renamed Patrick Air Force Base on 1 August 1950, in honor of Major General Mason M. Patrick and the following year, on 30 June 1951, the Joint Long Range Proving Ground Division became the Air Force Missile Test Center and the Joint Long Range Proving Ground became the Florida Missile Test Range (FMTR). These would not be the only name changes for the range or the agency that controlled it. The Florida Missile Test Range was renamed the Atlantic Missile Range (AMR) in 1958 and the Eastern Test Range in 1964; the Air Force Missile Test Center was redesignated the Air Force Eastern Test Range (AFETR) in 1964, then control of the range was transferred to Detachment 1 of the Space and Missile Test Center located at Vandenberg Air Force Base when AFETR was deactivated on 1 February 1977, which put both the Eastern and Western ranges under the same leadership. On 1 October 1979, control of the range passed to the newly activated Eastern Space and Missile Center (ESMC). The ESMC was transferred from Air Force Systems Command to Air Force Space Command on 10 October 1990; finally, on 12 November 1991, the 45th Space Wing was activated and assumed operational control for the range from ESMC; on the same day the Eastern Test Range became the Eastern Range. The transition on the west coast occurred one week later on 19 November 1991, when the Western Space and Missile Center became the 30th Space Wing and the Western Test Range became the Western Range.

In 2014, Raytheon Technologies won a contract to operate the Western and Eastern Ranges for the next 10 years through their subsidiary Range Generation Next.

In February 2017, SpaceX's CRS-10 launch was the "first operational use" of the Autonomous Flight Safety System (AFSS) on "either of Air Force Space Command's Eastern or Western Ranges". The following SpaceX flight, EchoStar 23 in March 2017, was the last SpaceX launch utilizing the historic system of ground radars, tracking computers, and personnel in launch bunkers that had been used for over sixty years for all launches from the Eastern Range. For all future SpaceX launches, AFSS has replaced "the ground-based mission flight control personnel and equipment with on-board Positioning, Navigation and Timing sources and decision logic. The benefits of AFSS include increased public safety, reduced reliance on range infrastructure, reduced range spacelift cost, increased schedule predictability and availability, operational flexibility, and launch slot flexibility".

In 2017, the Eastern Range suffered two hurricanes which caused extensive damage and only allowed 19 launches that year.

By 2017, the Eastern Range had upgraded their legacy operational processes and equipment to be able to support a much faster frequency of rocket launches for SpaceX AFTS-controlled rocket launches, but they did not use the capability when an opportunity arose to increase range launch rate in October 2018. The first planned use of the more rapid rate was in August 2019.

As of 2019, the range said that it could "support up to 48 launches per year from Florida" with an "eventual goal [to] get to a capability to launch two different rockets within 24 hours".

== Launch statistics ==
By year:

- 2016: 23 launches
- 2017: 19 launches - 2 hurricanes
- 2018: 34 scheduled
- 2019: ?
- 2020: ?
- 2021: ?
- 2022: 57
- 2023: 72

In early 2018, the plan was to get to 48 launches a year by about 2023.

== Location ==
The range starts at the launch pads at Cape Canaveral Space Force Station and John F. Kennedy Space Center and extends eastward over the Atlantic Ocean to 90° East longitude in the Indian Ocean, where it meets the Western Range.

The range consists of a chain of shore and sea-based tracking sites. "By January 1960, the Eastern Range included 13 major stations, approximately 91 outlying sites, a fleet of ships and three marine support stations. By September 1963, the Eastern Range extended around the tip of South Africa to the island of Mahé, Seychelles in the Indian Ocean". Much of the sea-based tracking and many of the land based stations have been replaced by space based tracking, including the present Tracking and Data Relay Satellite System (TDRSS).

Ground stations associated with the range are located at:

- Cape Canaveral Space Force Station, Florida 28°29′03″N 080°34′21″W
- John F. Kennedy Space Center, Florida
- Jupiter Auxiliary Air Force Base, Florida: 1950s

Located in what is now Jupiter Inlet Lighthouse Outstanding Natural Area

- Jonathan Dickinson Missile Tracking Annex (JDMTA): 1987–present

Located in the southern end of Jonathan Dickinson State Park 26°58′57.6″N 080°06′29.7″W

- Antigua Auxiliary Air Force Base

Located on the former Coolidge Air Force Base, St. John's, Antigua and Barbuda
Now: Antigua Air Station 17°08′14″N 061°46′33″W

- Ascension Auxiliary Air Force Base

Now: RAF Ascension Island 07°58′20″S 014°24′01″W

- Argentia, Newfoundland on the grounds of the decommissioned Argentia US Navy Facility (NAVFAC) which is staffed on an "as needed" basis for northerly launches 47°17′28″N 053°59′30″W

Major decommissioned stations associated with the range are located at:

- Grand Bahama Auxiliary Air Force Base 26°37′54.6″N 78°21′35.4″W

Located near: Gold Rock Creek, Grand Bahama Island, Bahamas

- Eleuthera Auxiliary Air Force Base 25°12′45″N 076°15′22″W

Located near: Governor's Harbor, Eleuthera Island, Bahamas

- San Salvador Auxiliary Air Force Base 24°03′42″N 074°32′01″W

Located near: Cockburntown, San Salvador Island, Bahamas

- Mayaguana Auxiliary Air Force Base 22°23′29″N 073°00′10″W

Located near: Abraham's Bay, Mayaguana Island, Bahamas

- Grand Turk Auxiliary Air Force Base 21°26′53″N 071°08′48″W

Located near: Cockburn Town, Grand Turk Island, Turks and Caicos Islands

- Dominican Republic Auxiliary Air Force Base 19°03′35″N 069°22′54″W

Located near: Sabena de la Mar, Dominican Republic

- Mayaguez Auxiliary Air Force Base 18°09′53″N 067°10′54″W

Located near: Mayagüez, Puerto Rico

- Saint Lucia Auxiliary Air Force Base 13°47′10″N 060°53′52″W

Located at the easternmost point of Saint Lucia

== Airborne and sea-based tracking assets ==
The Missile Impact Location System (MILS) was established in the then Atlantic Missile Range (AMR) from 1958 through 1960. The system was developed by American Telephone and Telegraph Company (AT&T), with its Bell Laboratories research and Western Electric manufacturing elements and was to an extent based on the company's technology and experience developing and deploying the U.S. Navy's then classified Sound Surveillance System (SOSUS). The company and Navy assets that had installed the first phase of SOSUS, starting in 1951, were engaged on MILS installation and activation.

Atlantic MILS target arrays, intended to precisely locate nose cone splashdown and then nose cone location on the bottom, were located down range from Cape Canaveral about 1,300 km (810 mi) at Grand Turk Island, 2,400 km (1,500 mi) at Antigua and 8,100 km (5,000 mi) at Ascension Island. The range managed the fixed transponders for Sonobuoy MILS (SMILS), exclusively used by the United States Navy Strategic Systems Project Office supporting the Navy's fleet ballistic missile programs. Much of that system's exact details were classified.

As recently as July 2007, NASA spacecraft such as Dawn have depended upon the availability of airborne and sea-based tracking assets associated with the East Range to monitor launch and ascent.

== See also ==
- Ascension Island
- DAMP Project – United States ARPA project to study missile reentry
- Missile Test Project
- Pacific Missile Range Facility
- Pan American Airways Guided Missile Range Division
- List of ships of the United States Air Force
- Western Launch and Test Range
- Missile Range Instrumentation Ship – Class of ships used for tracking missiles and satellites
