= Western Range (USSF) =

American launch vehicle range

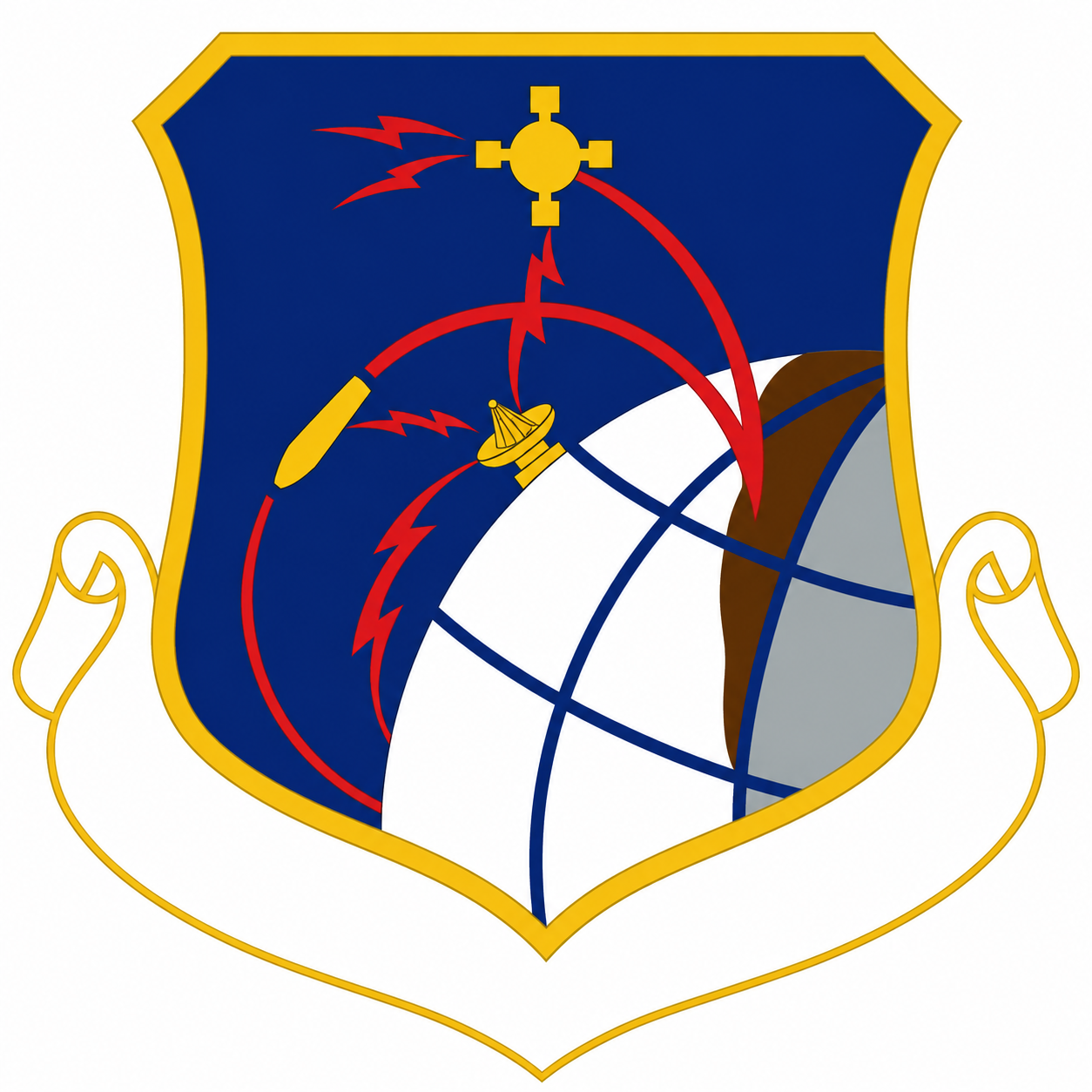
Emblem of the Western Test Range

The Western Range (WR) is the space launch range that supports the major launch head at Vandenberg Space Force Base. Managed by the Space Launch Delta 30, the WR extends from the West Coast of the United States to 90° east longitude in the Indian Ocean where it meets the Eastern Range Operations involve military, government, and commercial interests. The WR has been operated by civilian contractors since its establishment, following the precedent of the Eastern Range. On 1 October 2003, InDyne Inc. took over the range contract from ITT Industries which had operated the range for the previous 44 years.

== History ==
=== Navy's Pacific Missile Range (PMR) ===
The Navy established the Naval Missile Facility at Point Arguello (NMFPA) after the transfer from the Army of 19,800 acres from the southern portion of Camp Cooke in May 1958. Camp Cooke was a World War II training and POW facility and a maximum security Disciplinary Barracks site. Cooke Air Force Base, later Vandenberg Space Force Base, was established on 64,000 acres of the northern portion. The Secretary of Defense directed the Navy to establish the Pacific Missile Range (PMR) with headquarters at Point Mugu and instrumentation sites along the California coast and downrange in the Pacific Ocean. Agreements between the Navy and the Air Force specified that nearly all launches from Vandenberg Space Force Base were under the command and control of Navy and the PMR.

A Pacific Missile Impact Location System (MILS) was installed to support both Intermediate Range Ballistic Missile (IRBM) and Intercontinental Ballistic Missile (ICBM) tests. IRBM impacts were northeast of Hawaii and covered by a system terminating at the Marine Corps Air Station Kaneohe Bay operational November 1958. The ICBM impacts required MILS monitoring between Midway Island and Wake Island and between Wake Island and Eniwetok. Two target arrays and a Broad Ocean Area (BOA) array system were installed. The ICBM range was operational in May 1959 with two target arrays. MILS shore facilities were at Kaneohe and each of the islands.

=== Air Force — Western Test Range ===
Secretary of Defense Robert S. McNamara directed a restructure of the missile ranges on 16 November 1963 with an effective date of 1 July 1964. This restructure shifted responsibility of major sections of the Navy's Pacific Missile Range to the United States Air Force. In a final transfer, on 1 February 1965, the Air Force, with headquarters at Vandenberg Air Force Base, took control of Pillar Point, California, two sites in Hawaii, Canton Island, Midway Island, and Wake Island in the mid-Pacific as well as Eniwetok and Bikini Atoll in the Marshall Islands. The Air Force also took control of the six range instrumented ships Huntsville, Longview, Range Tracker, Richfield, Sunnyvale, and Watertown. The Navy retained a missile test facility at Point Mugu. In 1979, the name was shortened to simply the Western Test Range.

== Notable launches ==
- 28 February 1959 - Discoverer 1 - first spacecraft placed in a polar orbit.
- 29 September 2013 – Falcon 9 Flight 6, the first launch of the Falcon 9 v1.1 launch vehicle from a privately developed leased launchpad at Vandenberg Air Force Base was used in an unusual post-mission launch vehicle test. The first-stage booster of the SpaceX Falcon 9 launch vehicle will conduct a propulsive-return over-water test. After the second stage with the CASSIOPE payload separates from the booster, the booster will do a retro burn to reduce velocity from approximately Mach 10 (12,300 km/h; 7,610 mph) to a controllable descent velocity, and then a second burn just before it reaches the water to simulate a vertical landing of the first stage. This will be the first high-altitude, high-velocity test of the SpaceX reusable launch system development program.

== See also ==
- Eastern Range
- Missile Range Instrumentation Ship

== Bibliography ==
- "Western Range (U)". Federation of American Scientists.
- Gruss, Mike (6 April 2015). "Raytheon Team Wins US$2 Billion Air Force Range Support Contract". SpaceNews.
- 30th Space Wing History Office. "U.S. Air Force Fact Sheet". 30th Space Wing Public Affairs. Archived from the original on 10 January 2015.
- Western Test Range Handbook, Defense Technical Information Center, July 1981
