= OV1-17A =

US Air Force satellite

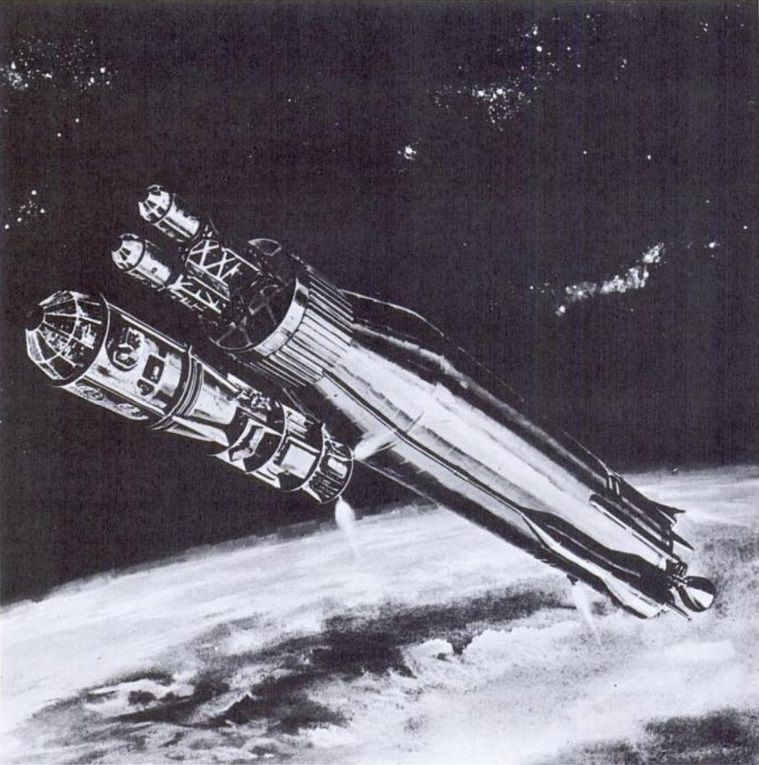
- OV1 satellite deployment on 18 March 1969 launch
- Mission type: Earth science
- Operator: USAF
- COSPAR ID: 1969-025D
- SATCAT no.: S03826

Spacecraft properties
- Manufacturer: Air Force Cambridge Research Laboratory
- Launch mass: 221 kg (487 lb)

Start of mission
- Launch date: 18 March 1969 UTC
- Rocket: Atlas F
- Launch site: Vandenberg 576-A-2

End of mission
- Decay date: 24 March 1969

Orbital parameters
- Regime: Low Earth Orbit
- Perigee altitude: 374 km (232 mi)
- Apogee altitude: 172 km (107 mi)
- Inclination: 99.1°
- Period: 93.2
- Epoch: 18 March 1969 07:41:00 UTC

Orbiting Vehicle 1–17A (also known as OV1-17A and ORBISCAL (Orbiting Radio Beacon Ionospheric Satellite Calibration) 2) was the last in the ORBIS series of satellites designed to investigate ionospheric ducting (a phenomenon which improves the propagation of radio signals). The satellite was part of a quadruple payload launch on 18 March 1969 on an Atlas F along with OV1-18, OV1-19, and OV1-17; specifically, it was attached to the propulsion module of OV1-17. The satellite operated normally for eight days before reentering on 24 March 1969.

== History ==
The Orbiting Vehicle satellite program arose from a US Air Force initiative, begun in the early 1960s, to reduce the expense of space research. Through this initiative, satellites would be standardized to improve reliability and cost-efficiency, and where possible, they would fly on test vehicles or be piggybacked with other satellites. In 1961, the Air Force Office of Aerospace Research (OAR) created the Aerospace Research Support Program (ARSP) to request satellite research proposals and choose mission experiments. The USAF Space and Missiles Organization created their own analog of the ARSP called the Space Experiments Support Program (SESP), which sponsored a greater proportion of technological experiments than the ARSP. Five distinct OV series of standardized satellites were developed under the auspices of these agencies.

The OV1 program, managed by Lt. Col. Clyde Northcott Jr. was an evolution of the 2.7 m "Scientific Passenger Pods" (SPP), which, starting on 2 October 1961, rode piggyback on suborbital Atlas missile tests and conducted scientific experiments during their short time in space. General Dynamics received a $2 million contract on 13 September 1963 to build a new version of the SPP (called the Atlas Retained Structure (ARS)) that would carry a self-orbiting satellite. Once the Atlas missile and ARS reached apogee, the satellite inside would be deployed and thrust itself into orbit. In addition to the orbital SPP, General Dynamics would create six of these satellites, each to be 3.66 m (12.0 ft) long with a diameter of .762 m (2 ft 6.0 in), able to carry a 136 kg (300 lb) payload into a circular 805 km (500 mi) orbit.

Dubbed "Satellite for Aerospace Research" (SATAR), the series of satellites was originally to be launched from the Eastern Test Range on Atlas missions testing experimental Advanced Ballistic Re-Entry System (ABRES) nosecones. However, in 1964, the Air Force transferred ABRES launches to the Western Test Range causing a year's delay for the program. Moreover, because WTR launches would be into polar orbit as opposed to the low-inclination orbits typical of ETR launches, less mass could be lofted into orbit using the same thrust, and the mass of the SATAR satellites had to be reduced.

Prior to the quadruple launch of which OV1-17A was a part, there had been 16 satellites in the OV1 series, the first orbited on January 21, 1965. After OV1-1, the last ABRES test launch, OV1-2 through 12 were launched on decommissioned Atlas D ICBMs, with the exception of OV1-6, launched via the Titan IIIC tasked for the Manned Orbiting Laboratory test flight. OV1-13 and OV1-14 were the first to be launched on a decommissioned Atlas F.

Strictly speaking, OV1-17A was not part of the OV1 series, instead being part of the ORBIS (satellite) series of satellites developed by Air Force Cambridge Research Laboratory designed to investigate ionospheric ducting at high and low altitudes. OV2-5 carried a high altitude ORBIS transmitter as one of its experiments, and OV4-3 carried a low altitude ORBIS transmitter. OV1-17A was the last of the ORBIS series, being a reflight of ORBISCAL 1, lost in a 12-satellite Atlas-Burner launch failure in August 1968.

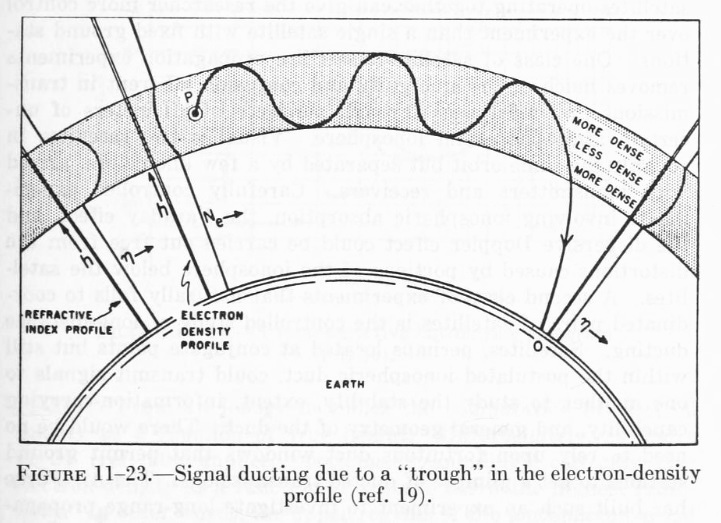
Diagram depicting atmospheric ducting of radio signals

== Spacecraft design ==
ORBISCAL 2 operated two 2 Watt transmitters operating on 8.98 and 13.25 MHz using two 6.4 m (21 ft) antennas. There was also a 6.4 m (21 ft) intertial boom for dampening wobble. Sufficient battery power was provided for ten days of transmission. The satellite was mounted on the OV1-17 PAM between its satellite attach fitting and the motor casing for the Altair 3. The satellite carried a small, solid-fuel engine to deboost the craft into a lower operating orbit.

== Mission ==
OV1-17A was launched from Vandenberg's 576-A-2 launch pad along with OV1-18, OV1-19, and OV1-17 on an Atlas F rocket on 18 March 1969 at around 7:47:35 UTC into an orbit that took it from 374 km (232 mi) above the Earth to minimum172.00 km (106.88 mi) with an inclination of 99.1° and a period of 93.2 minutes. Once in orbit, the propulsion module separated to become its own satellite.

The satellite reentered the atmosphere on 24 March 1969.

== Results ==
Ground stations tuned into ORBISCAL 2's beacons for its eight day lifespan in orbit. The stations at Thule and at Sagamore Hill, Massachusetts frequently recorded propagation ranges of 20,000 kilometers during both day and night hours. It was the last satellite in the ORBIS series.
