= OV1-17 =

US Air Force satellite

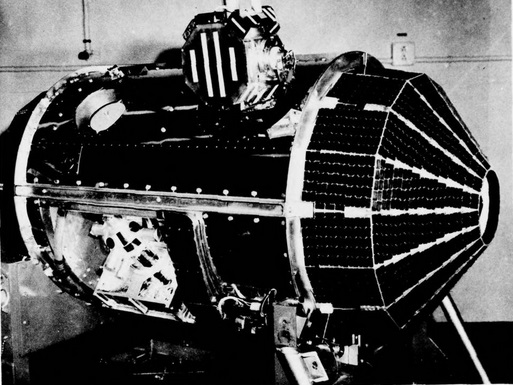
- Mission type: Earth science
- Operator: USAF
- COSPAR ID: 1969-025A
- SATCAT no.: S03823

Spacecraft properties
- Manufacturer: General Dynamics
- Launch mass: 142 kg (313 lb)

Start of mission
- Launch date: 18 March 1969 UTC
- Rocket: Atlas F
- Launch site: Vandenberg 576-A-2

End of mission
- Decay date: 5 March 1970

Orbital parameters
- Regime: Low Earth Orbit
- Eccentricity: 0.00484
- Perigee altitude: 397.00 km (246.68 mi)
- Apogee altitude: 463.00 km (287.69 mi)
- Inclination: 99.100°
- Period: 93.2 minutes
- Epoch: 18 March 1969 07:41:00 UTC

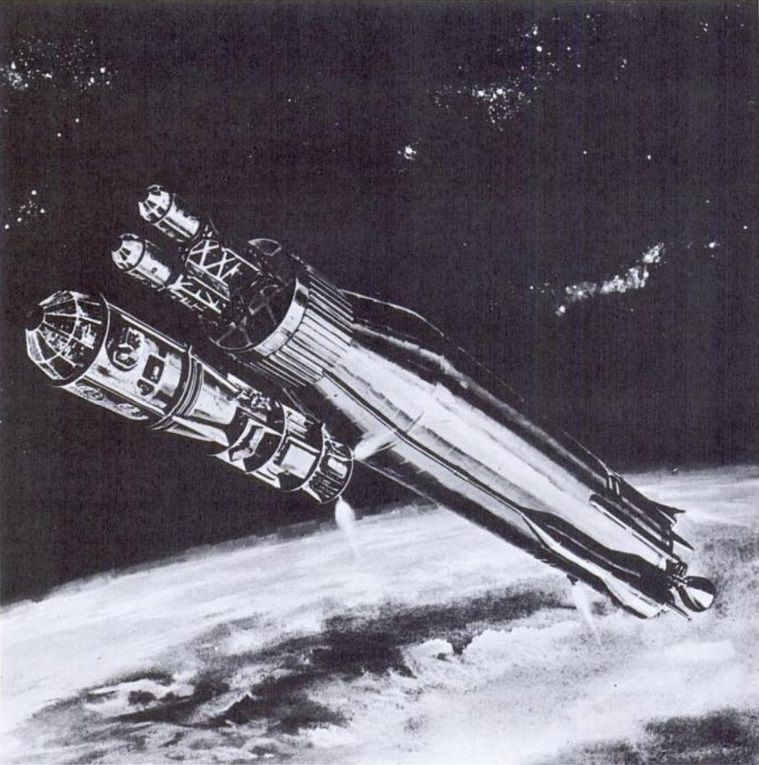
OV1 satellite deployment on 18 March 1969 launch

Orbiting Vehicle 1–17 (also known as OV1-17) was solar radiation satellite, part of a quadruple payload launch on 18 March 1969. Part of the OV1 series of USAF satellites, using standardized designs and sent to orbit on decommissioned Atlas ICBMs to reduce development and launching costs, OV1-17 was launched via Atlas F along with OV1-18 and OV1-19. Its primary purpose was to measure the effects of the Earth's ionosphere on detection, control, communications, and tracking systems in space. Because its stabilization system failed to deploy, and because of the abbreviated data sets, the flight yielded relatively few scientific results. Still, 11 papers were published using OV1-17 data. Once in orbit, OV1-17's propulsion system detached, becoming a separate satellite designated OV1-17A. This sub-satellite carried radio beacons for determining if meteor trails could be used for relaying radio messages. OV1-17 reentered Earth's atmosphere on 5 March 1970, OV1-17A on 24 March 1969.

== Background ==
The Orbiting Vehicle satellite program arose from a US Air Force initiative, begun in the early 1960s, to reduce the expense of space research. Through this initiative, satellites would be standardized to improve reliability and cost-efficiency, and where possible, they would fly on test vehicles or be piggybacked with other satellites. In 1961, the Air Force Office of Aerospace Research (OAR) created the Aerospace Research Support Program (ARSP) to request satellite research proposals and choose mission experiments. The USAF Space and Missiles Organization created their own analog of the ARSP called the Space Experiments Support Program (SESP), which sponsored a greater proportion of technological experiments than the ARSP. Five distinct OV series of standardized satellites were developed under the auspices of these agencies.

The OV1 program, managed by Lt. Col. Clyde Northcott Jr. was an evolution of the 2.7 m "Scientific Passenger Pods" (SPP), which, starting on 2 October 1961, rode piggyback on suborbital Atlas missile tests and conducted scientific experiments during their short time in space. General Dynamics received a $2 million contract on 13 September 1963 to build a new version of the SPP (called the Atlas Retained Structure (ARS)) that would carry a self-orbiting satellite. Once the Atlas missile and ARS reached apogee, the satellite inside would be deployed and thrust itself into orbit. In addition to the orbital SPP, General Dynamics would create six of these satellites, each to be 3.66 m (12.0 ft) long with a diameter of .762 m (2 ft 6.0 in), able to carry a 136 kg (300 lb) payload into a circular 805 km (500 mi) orbit.

Dubbed "Satellite for Aerospace Research" (SATAR), the series of satellites was originally to be launched from the Eastern Test Range on Atlas missions testing experimental Advanced Ballistic Re-Entry System (ABRES) nosecones. However, in 1964, the Air Force transferred ABRES launches to the Western Test Range causing a year's delay for the program. Moreover, because WTR launches would be into polar orbit as opposed to the low-inclination orbits typical of ETR launches, less mass could be lofted into orbit using the same thrust, and the mass of the SATAR satellites had to be reduced.

Prior to the quadruple launch of which OV1-17 was a part, there had been 16 satellites in the OV1 series, the first orbited on January 21, 1965. After OV1-1, the last ABRES test launch, OV1-2 through 12 were launched on decommissioned Atlas D ICBMs, with the exception of OV1-6, launched via the Titan IIIC tasked for the Manned Orbiting Laboratory test flight. OV1-13 and OV1-14 were the first to be launched on a decommissioned Atlas F.

The Orbiting Vehicle program was succeeded by the Space Test Program, managed by the Space Missile Organization's Space Experiments Support Program, which had absorbed the ARSP in 1968, and OV1-17 was launched under its auspices. The OV1 program ultimately comprised 22 missions, the last flying on 19 September 1971.

== Spacecraft design ==
OV1-17, like the rest of the OV1 satellite series, consisted of a cylindrical experiment housing capped with flattened cones on both ends containing 5000 solar cells producing 22 watts of power. Continuing the design trend started with OV1-7, the solar cells were flat rather than curved, as had been in the case with the first six OV1 satellites. Two .46 m (1 ft 6 in) antennae for transmitting telemetry and receiving commands extended from the sides of the spacecraft. 12 helium-pressurized hydrogen peroxide thrusters provided attitude control.

Unlike most of the prior satellites in the OV1 series, OV1-17 was not spin-stabilized, but was supposed to maintain its attitude through Vertistat, a gravity-gradient stabilization system consisting of three 15.5 m (51 ft)-long horizontal booms forming a 'y' and two 19 m (62 ft)-long vertical booms. This system was demonstrated unsuccessfully on OV1-7 and OV1-86, but successfully on OV1-10.

Two 6.45 m (21.2 ft)-long antenna beacons, operating on 13.23 and 8.98 MHz, were mounted on OV1-17's propulsion module along with a 6.45 m (21.2 ft) inertial boom. Once separated from OV1-17, the propulsion module was designed to be an independent satellite providing information on the usability of meteor trails to relay radio messages. The experiment on the sub-satellite, dubbed "Orbis-Cal 2", was designed and run by the Naval Research Laboratory.

== Experiments ==
OV1-17's primary purpose was to measure the effects of the Earth's ionosphere on detection, control, communications, and tracking systems in space, Its suite of 12 experiments included three crystal spectrometers for detecting solar X-rays, a large deployable dish antenna for measuring radio interference, and an electron spectrometer developed by Lockheed for detecting auroral electrons (in conjunction with ATS-5 using a similar experiment). Further instruments were to measure ion densities, gamma radiation, and the energy spectra of electrons and protons, while the booms themselves would measure electric fields.

The satellite also carried a meteor trail calibration beacon to see if such trails could be used to relay radio messages. A pane of 14 cadmium sulfide solar cells and a set of thermal control coatings were mounted to determine performance and radiation resistance.

== Mission ==
OV1-17 was launched from Vandenberg's 576-A-2 launch pad along with OV1-18, OV1-19, and OV1-17A (housed in OV1-17's propulsion module) on an Atlas F rocket on 18 March 1969 at around 7:47:35 UTC into an orbit that took it from 463 km (288 mi) above the Earth to minimum397.00 km (246.68 mi). Once in orbit, the propulsion module separated and fired an onboard rocket to become its own satellite in a lower orbit, operating normally for eight days before reentering Earth's atmosphere on 24 March 1969. It was designated OV1-17A, (COSPAR ID 1969-26D, SATCAT S03826)

The Vertistat on OV1-17 failed to deploy properly, as had happened on previous flights, causing the spacecraft to tumble, which rendered four of the seven environmental experiments useless. Moreover, the three remaining aerospace experiments only received useful data for relatively short time periods, limiting results.

OV1-17 reentered Earth's atmosphere on 5 March 1970.

== Results ==
Despite the failure of the Vertistat system, OV1-17 collected data on extremely-low frequency radio propagation, horizon dayglow, nightglow, high-energy solar protons, magnetospheric ions, electric fields, gamma radiation, and the energy spectra of electrons and protons, and 11 papers were published based on OV1-17 data.
