= Scout X-2M =

U.S. rocket, 1962-1963

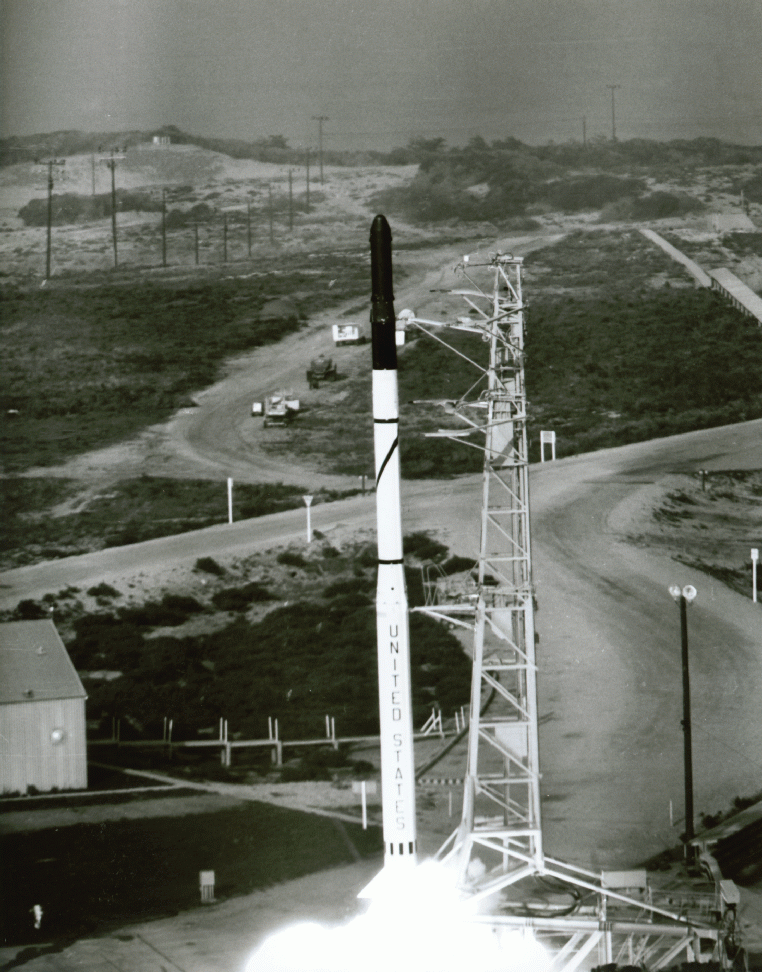
- Scout X-2M with P35-1 payload (DMSP-1, FTV-3501), May 24, 1962
- Function: Expendable launch system
- Manufacturer: Vought
- Country of origin: United States

Size
- Height: 22 metres (72 ft)
- Diameter: 1.02 metres (3 ft 4 in)
- Mass: 17,000 kilograms (37,000 lb)
- Stages: Four

Associated rockets
- Family: Scout

Launch history
- Status: Retired
- Launch sites: Point Arguello LC-D
- Total launches: 3
- Success(es): 1
- Failure(s): 2
- First flight: 1962-05-24
- Last flight: 1963-04-26

First stage – Algol 1D
- Powered by: 1 solid
- Maximum thrust: 440 kilonewtons (99,000 lb_{f})
- Burn time: 44 seconds
- Propellant: Solid

Second stage – Castor 1A
- Powered by: 1 solid
- Maximum thrust: 286 kilonewtons (64,000 lb_{f})
- Specific impulse: 247 sec
- Burn time: 27 seconds
- Propellant: Solid

Third stage – Antares 2A
- Powered by: 1 X-254
- Maximum thrust: 93 kilonewtons (21,000 lb_{f})
- Specific impulse: 293 sec
- Burn time: 36 seconds
- Propellant: Solid

Fourth stage – MG-18
- Powered by: 1 Solid
- Propellant: Solid

Scout X-2M was an American expendable launch system which was flown three times between May 1962 and April 1963. It was a four-stage rocket, based on the earlier Scout X-2, but with an MG-18 upper stage instead of the Altair used on the X-2. It was a member of the Scout family of rockets.

The Scout X-2 was an all-solid rocket, with an Algol 1D first stage, a Castor 1A second stage, an Antares 2A third stage, and an MG-18 fourth stage. It was launched from Launch Complex D at Point Arguello, and was used for the launch of P-35 weather satellites.

The first Scout X-2M was launched 24 May 1962, carrying P35-1, but failed to reach orbit. The second flight, launched at 11:44 GMT on 23 August, was the only successful launch to be made by an X-2M, placing P35-2 into low Earth orbit. The final launch, with P35-4 occurred on 26 April 1963, and like the first flight, it failed to reach orbit.
