= Project FIRE =

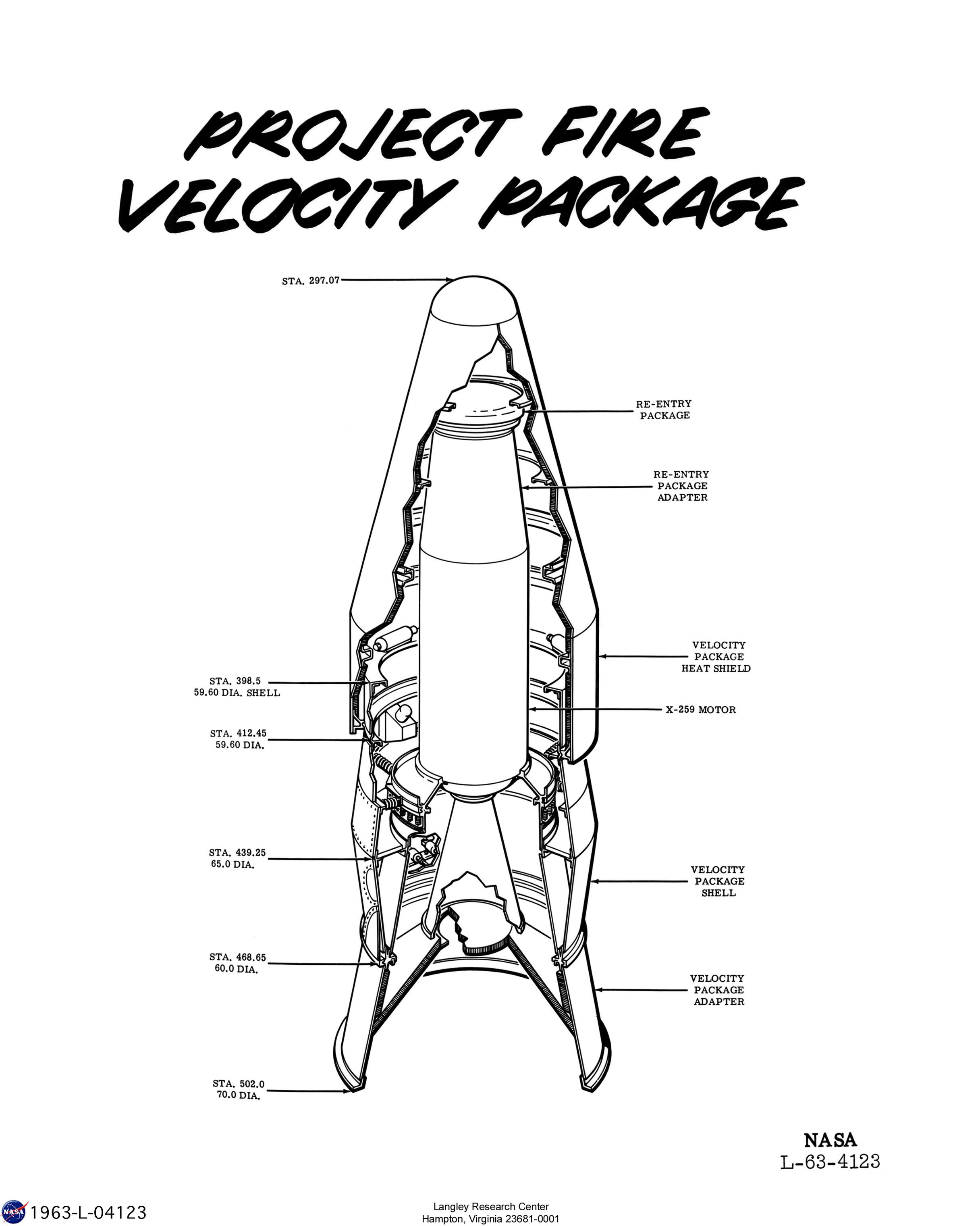
Schematic drawing of Project FIRE Velocity Package. This was the design of a package used for flight tests with the Atlas rockets.

Project FIRE (Flight Investigation Reentry Environment) was a United States NASA effort to determine the effects of atmospheric entry on spacecraft materials.

Project FIRE used both ground testing in wind tunnels and flight tests to test the effects of reentry heating on spacecraft materials, using a subscale model of the Apollo Command Module.

== Wind tunnel tests ==
Wind tunnel testing occurred at the 4-foot Unitary Plan Wind Tunnel, the High-Temperature Tunnel, and the Thermal Structures Tunnel at the Langley Research Center located in Hampton, Virginia.

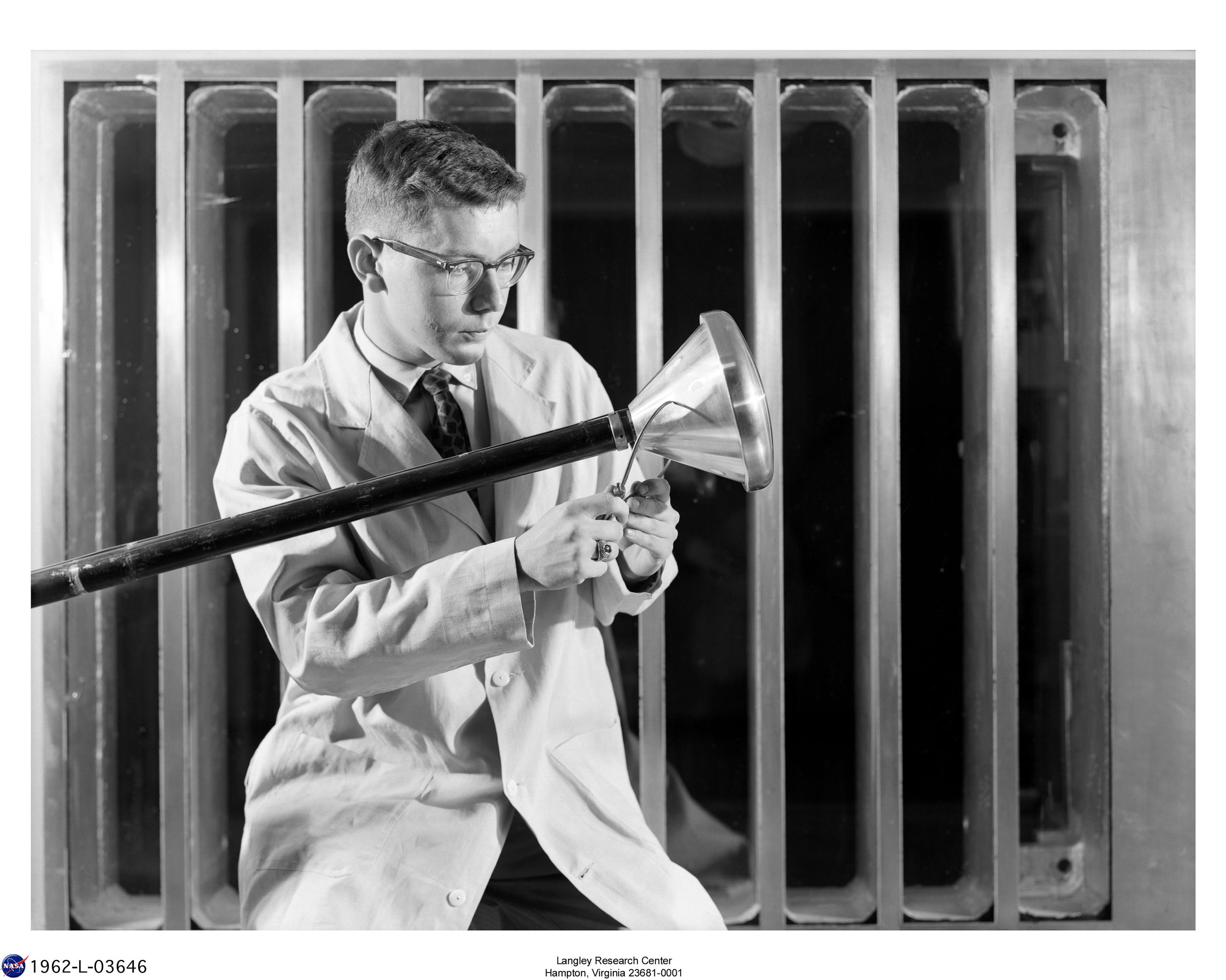
Researcher checks model of Project FIRE Reentry package to be tested in Unitary Plan Wind Tunnel.

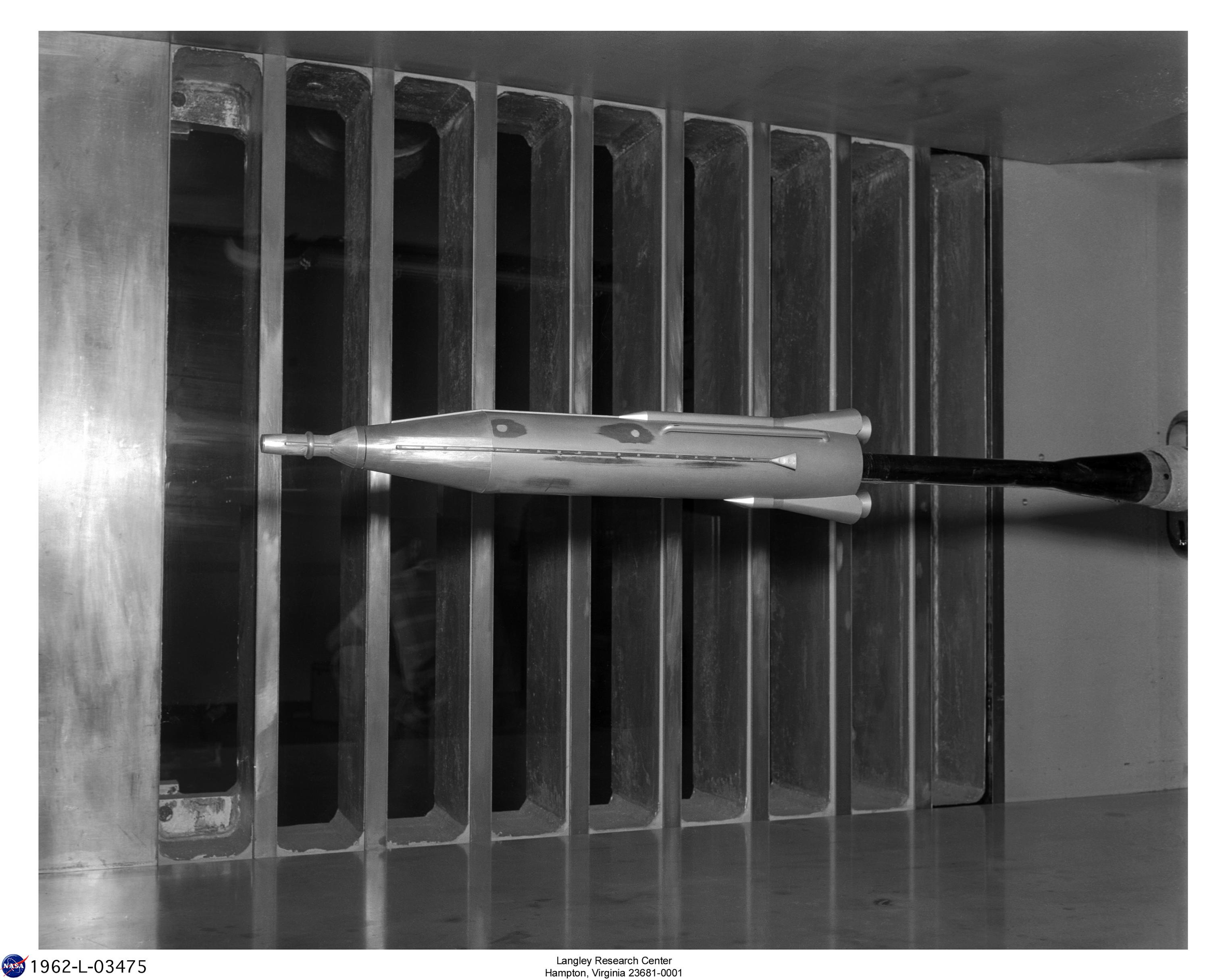
Test of Project FIRE model in Unitary Plan Wind Tunnel

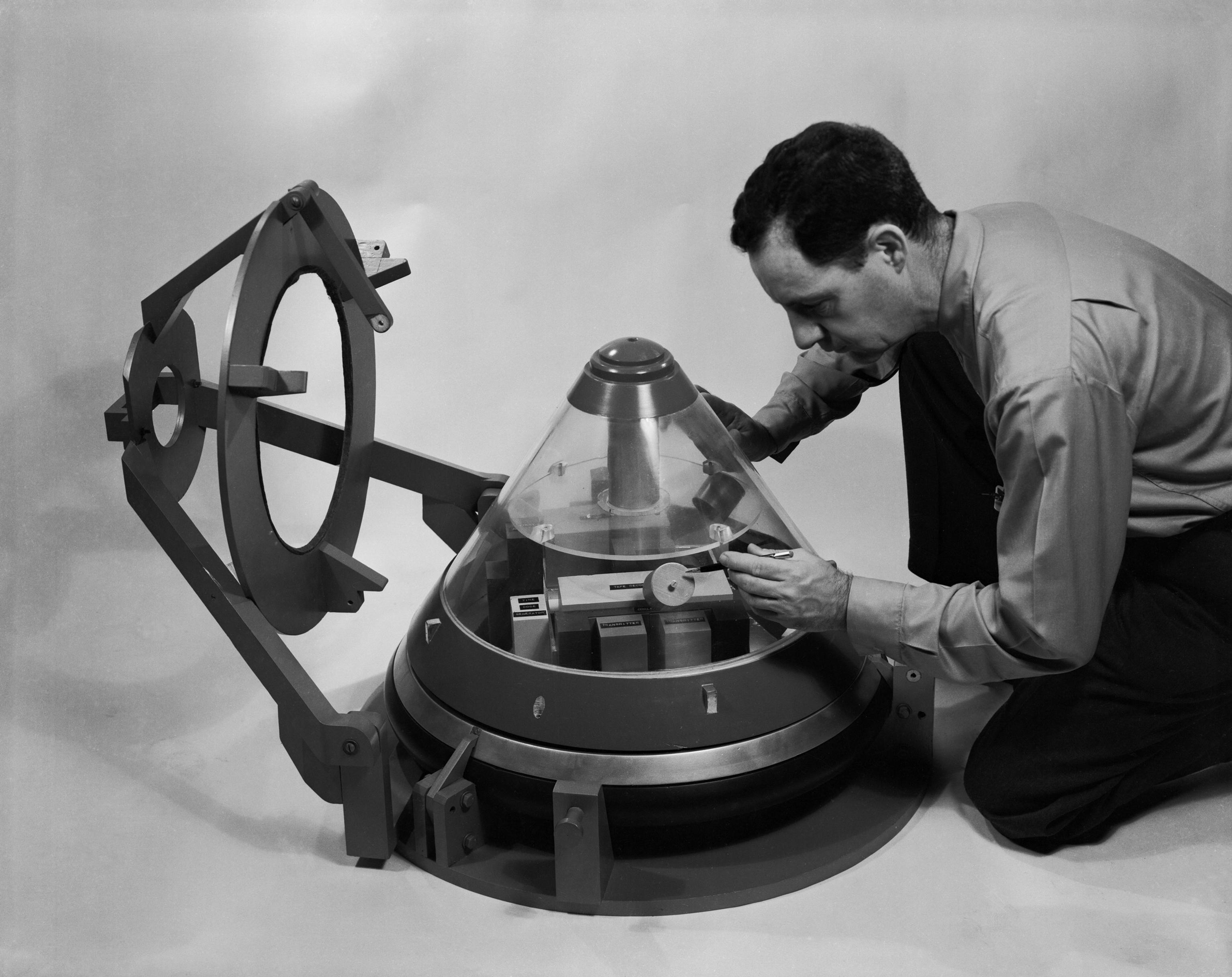
Project FIRE model for wind tunnel tests

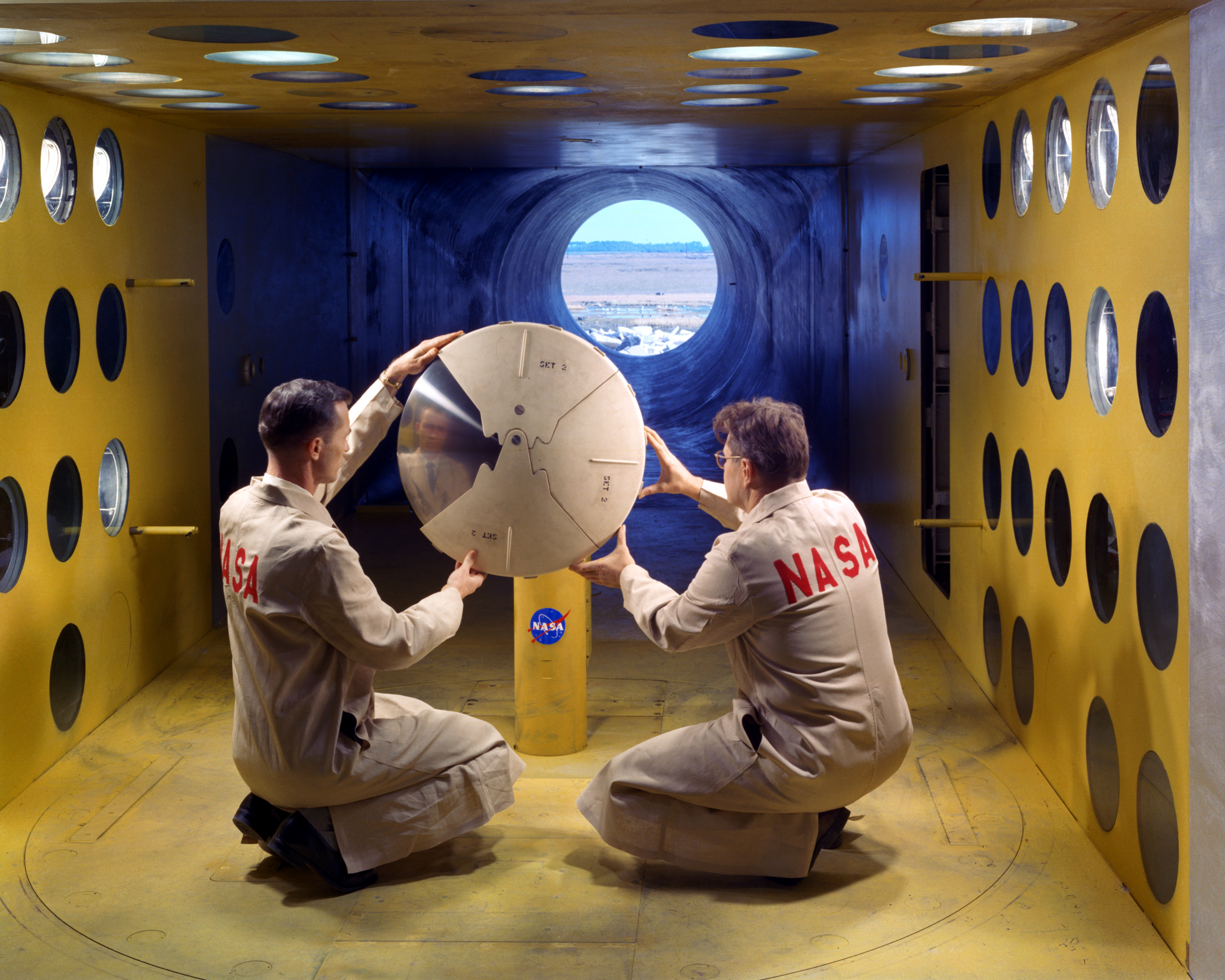
Project FIRE technicians preparing materials to be subjected to high temperatures that will simulate the effects of re-entry heating.

== Flight tests ==
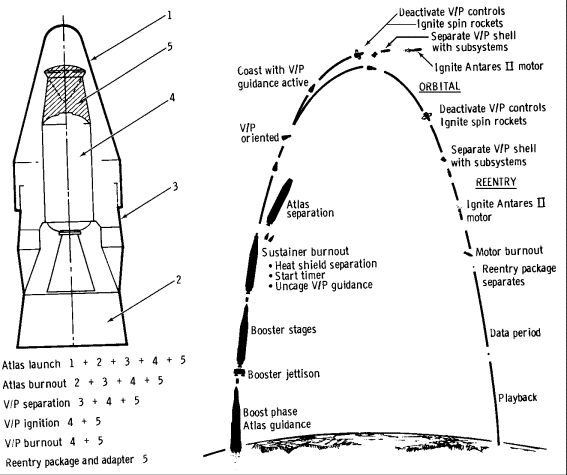
Project FIRE - Configuration of the upper stage and probe; flight trajectory

Recoverable reentry packages were flight tested using Atlas-D rockets with Antares-2 solid fuel upper stages (also used on the Scout rocket family), launched from LC 12 at Cape Canaveral Air Force Station in Florida, United States.

=== FIRE 1 ===
The first Project FIRE reentry package was propelled to an altitude of 122 km (76 miles) by an Atlas-D Antares-2 launch vehicle (missile 263D) on 14 April 1964.

Following a coasting phase that reached an apogee exceeding 800 km (500 miles) the velocity package initiated the reentry vehicle's trajectory, plunging it into a trajectory at a velocity of 11,300 m/s (25,000 mph) with a minus 15 degree trajectory. As the spacecraft descended towards Earth, a solid-fuel Antares II rocket positioned behind the payload ignited for 30 seconds, elevating the descent speed to 40,501 km/h (25,166 mph). Temperature data from the spacecraft's instruments were transmitted to the ground, indicating an estimated exterior temperature of 11,400 K (20,100 °F).

Approximately 32 minutes post-launch, the spacecraft made impact into the Atlantic Ocean.

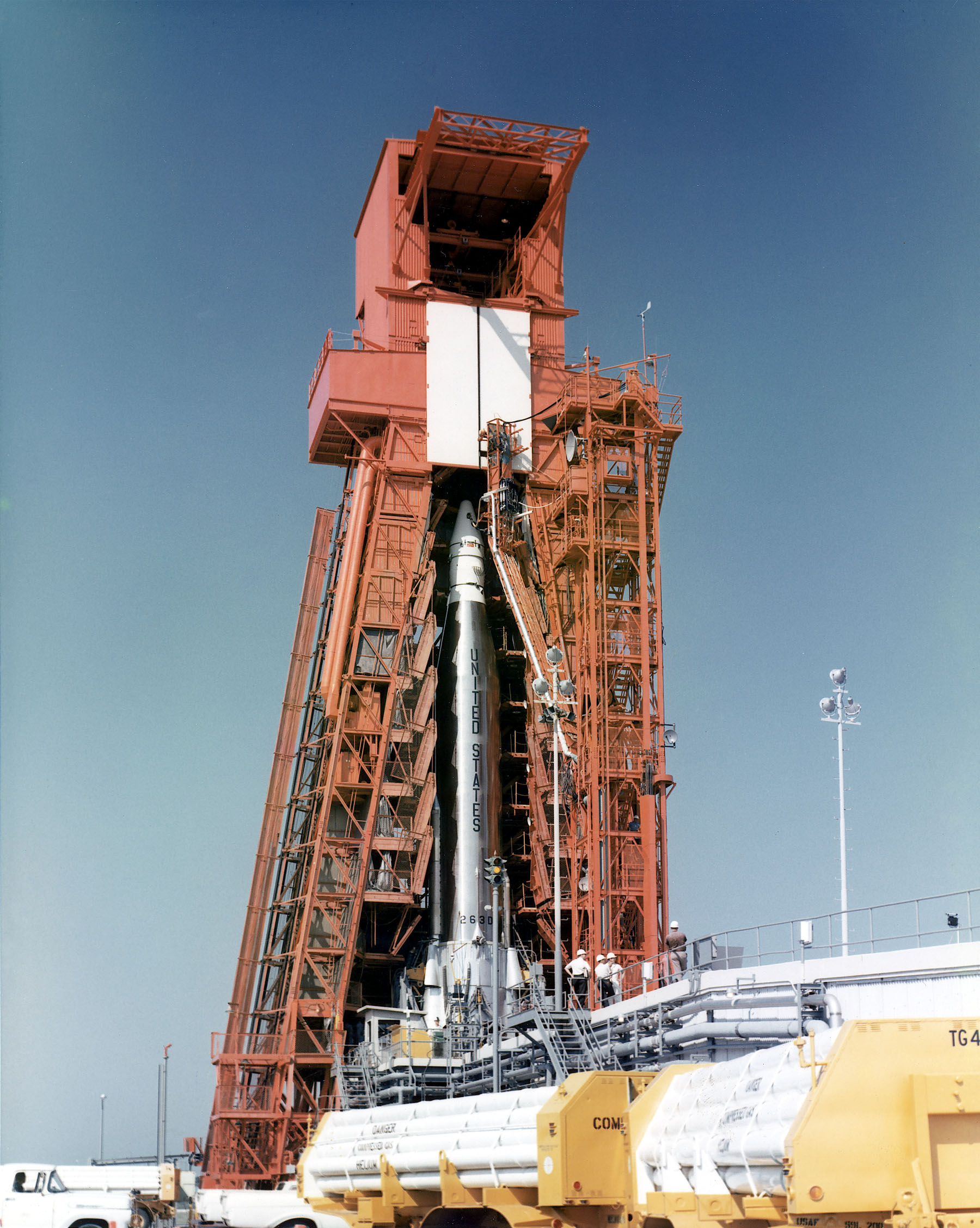
Gantry pull back at LC-12 for an Atlas 263D launch with Project FIRE 1

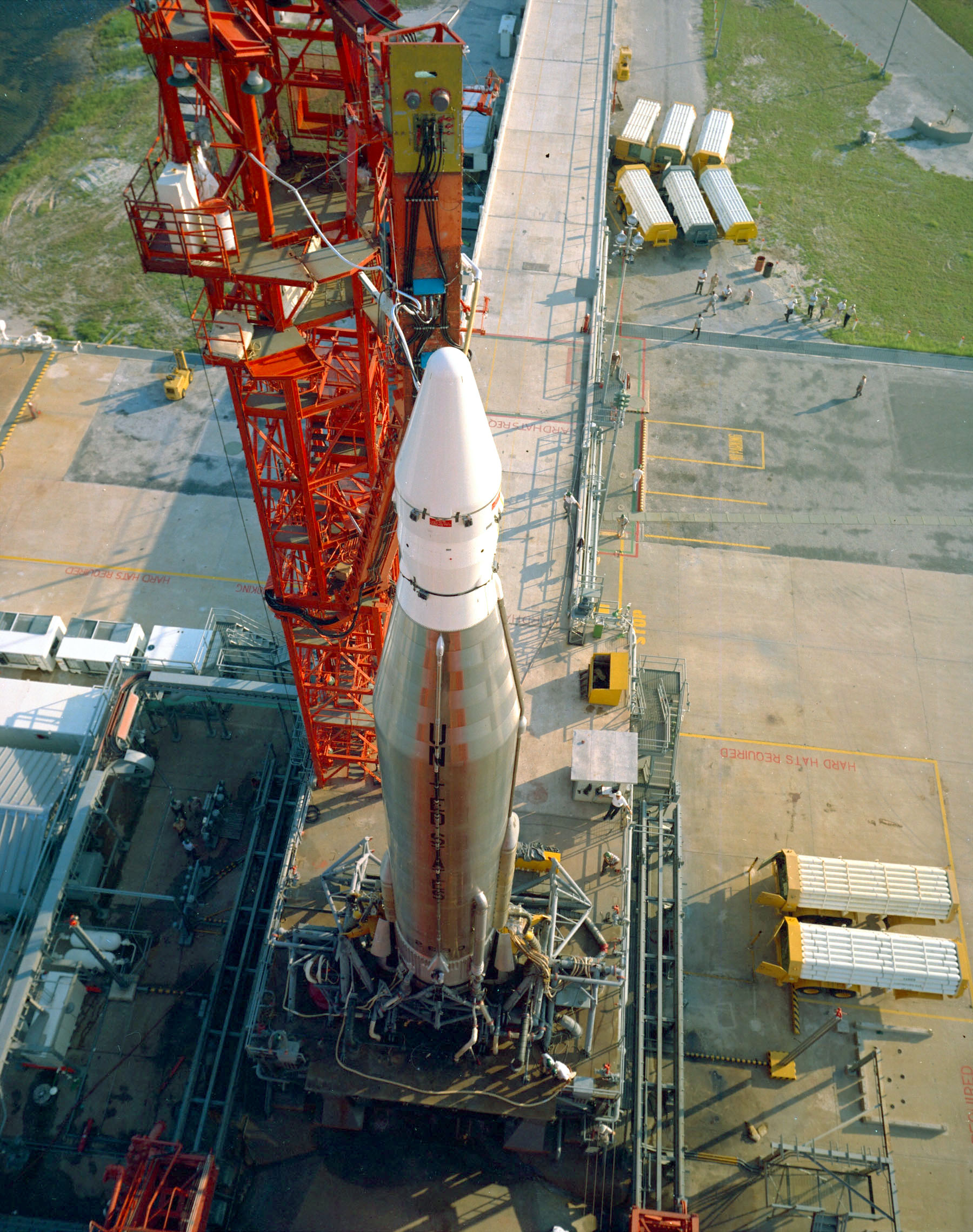
Atlas 263D rocket with Antares upper stage carrying Fire 1 re-entry capsule

=== FIRE 2 ===
During the second trial, a propelled instrumented probe, referred to as a "flying thermometer", was launched into a ballistic trajectory over 805 km (500 miles) high by an Atlas-D Antares-2 booster (missile 264D) on 22 May 1965.

As the spacecraft initiated its descent after 26 minutes of flight, the Antares II rocket accelerated its fall. The probe entered the atmosphere at a velocity of 40,877 km/h (25,400 mph), generating temperatures of approximately 11,206 K (19,711 °F). Ground stations received data on heating throughout the descent.

Thirty-two minutes post-launch, and a mere six minutes after the Antares ignition, the device impacted in the Atlantic Ocean approximately 8,256 km (5,130 miles) southeast of the Cape.

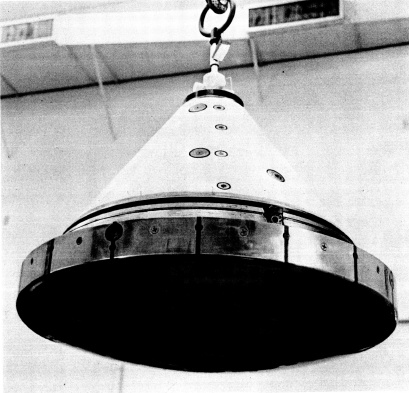
Project FIRE 2 reentry package

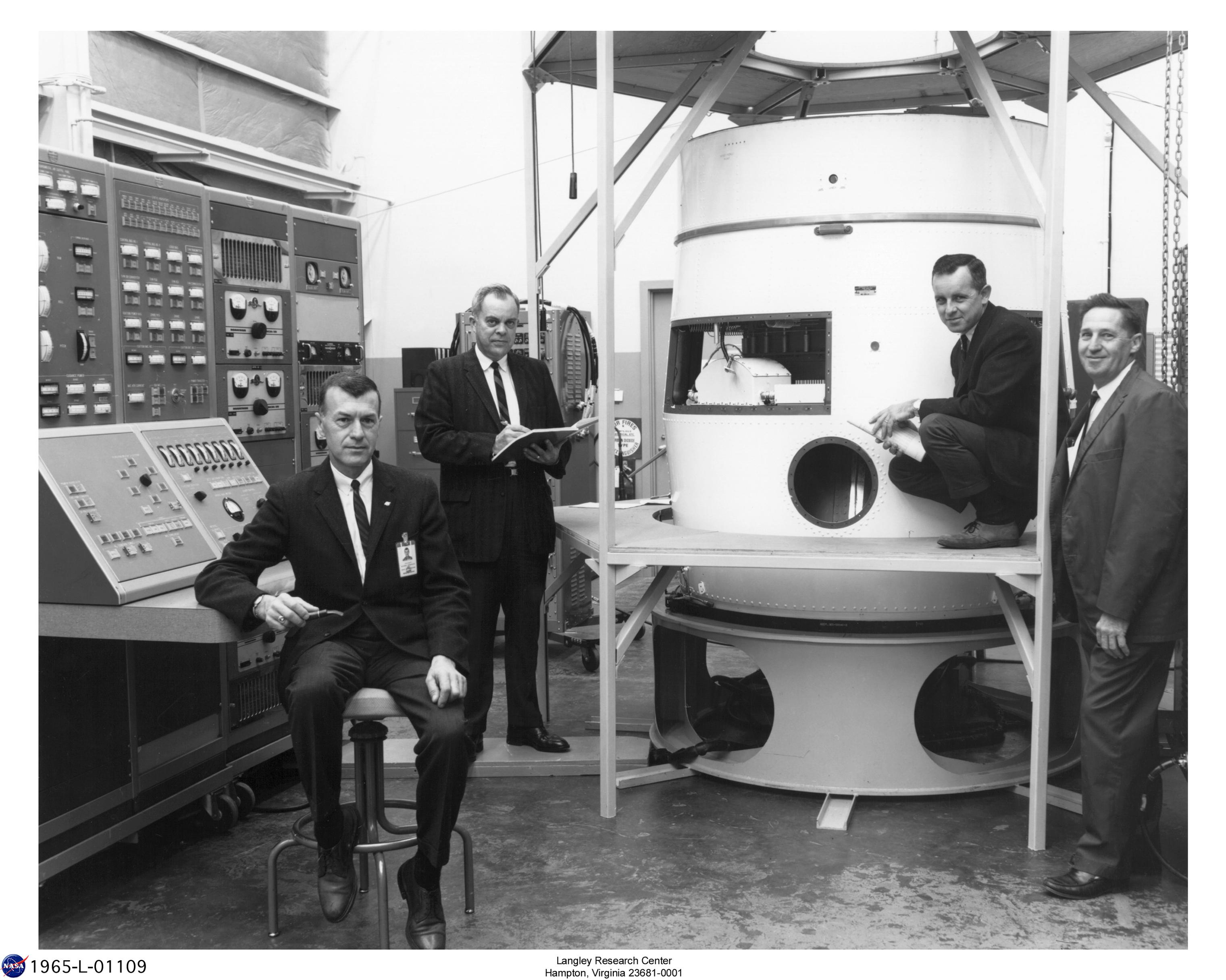
Personnel of Langley Research Center at Cape Canaveral during preliminary checkout of Project FIRE velocity package before launch

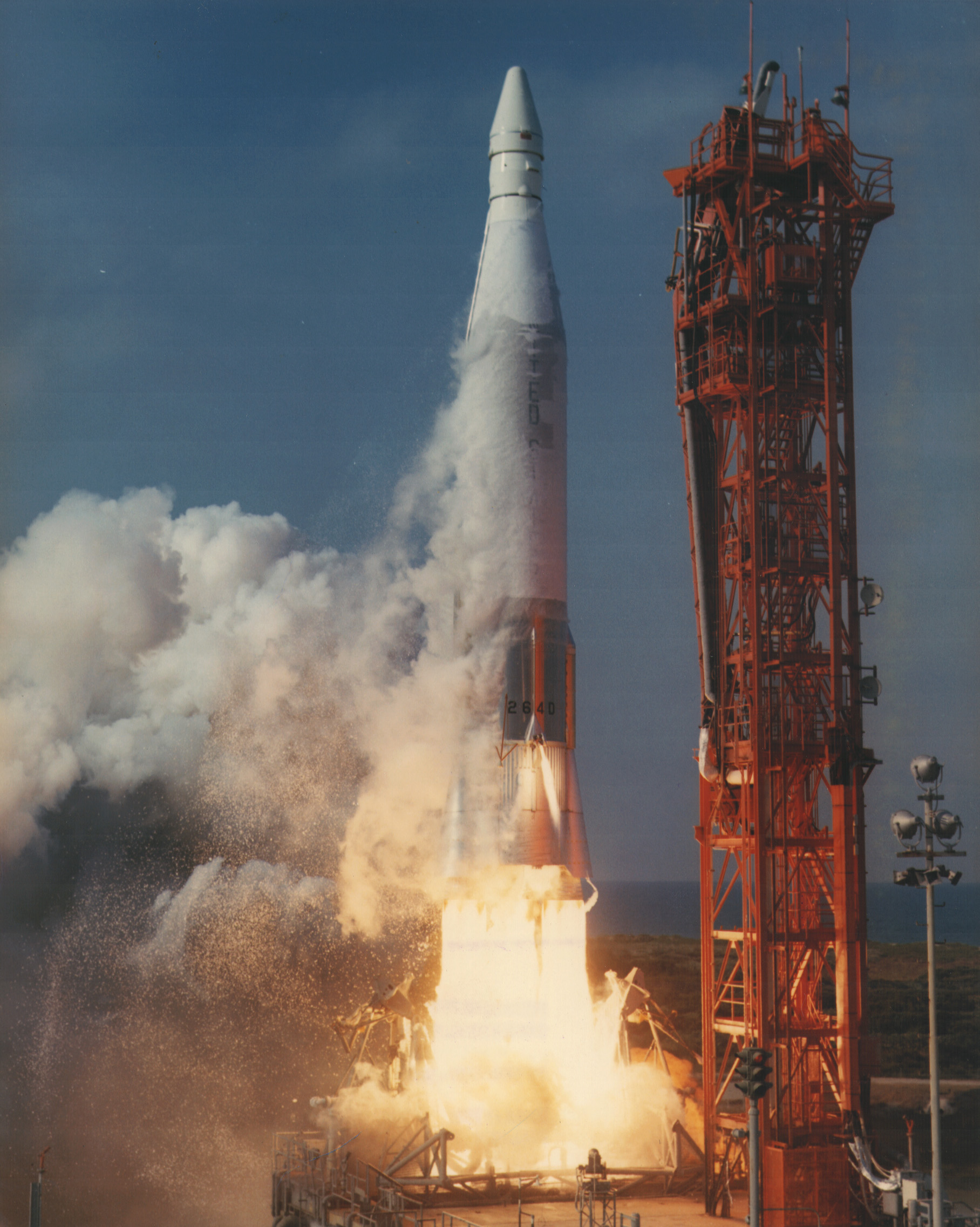
Project FIRE 2 lifts off from launch complex 12 aboard an Atlas 264D, 22 May 1965

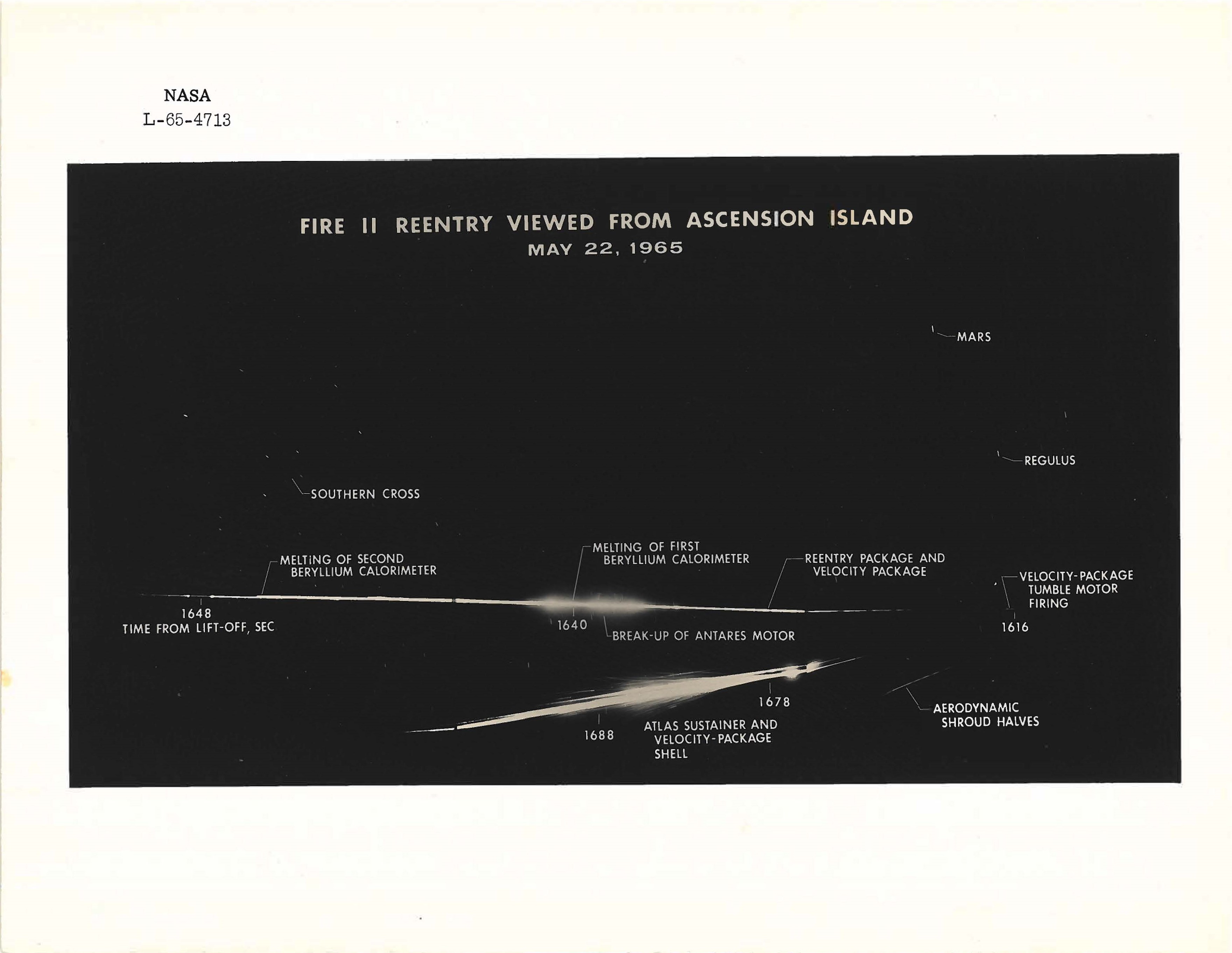
Project FIRE 2 reentry vehicle as photographed from Ascension Island

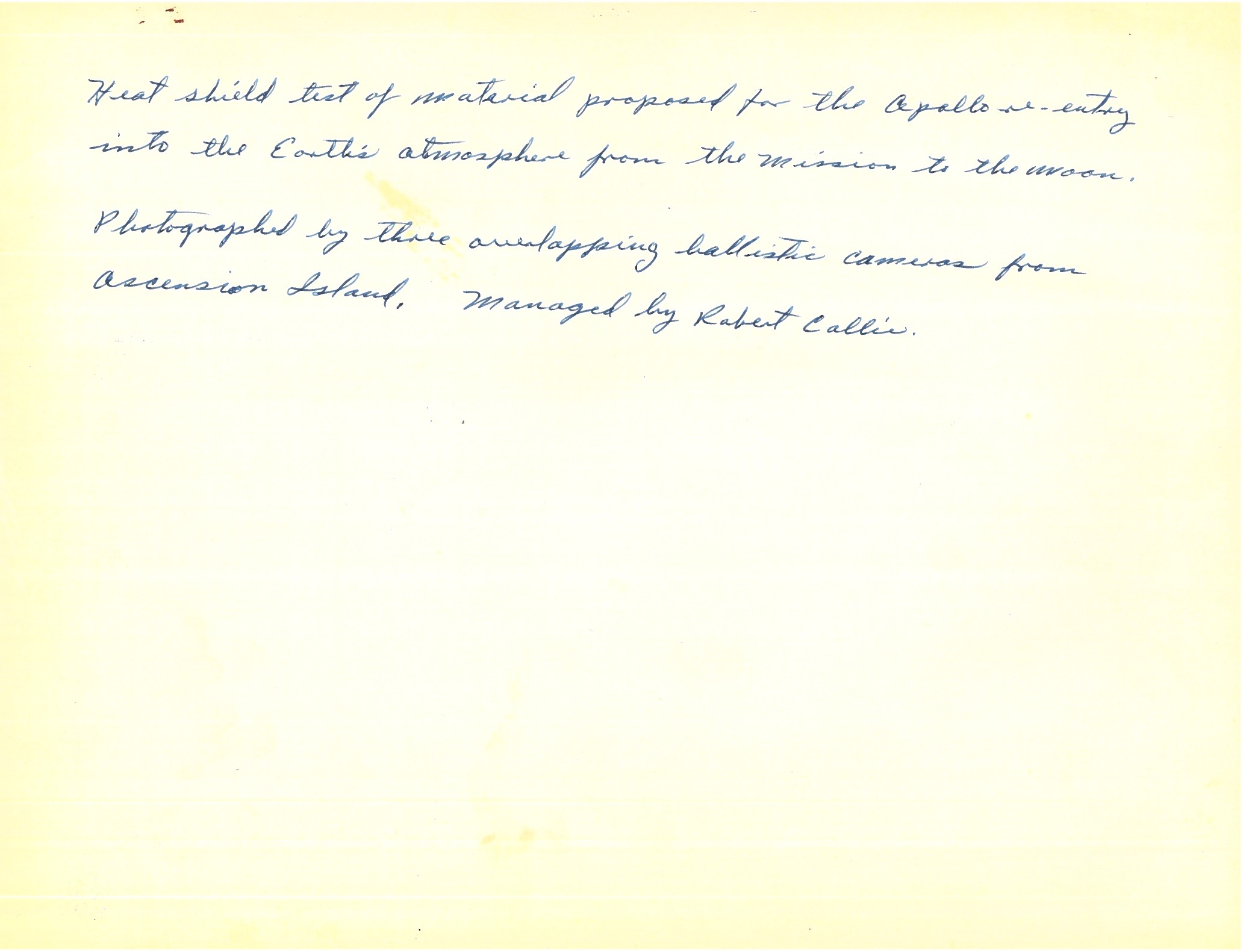
Project FIRE 2 reentry vehicle photograph notes by photographer Robert Collie
