= Scout X-2B =

U.S. rocket, 1963

- Manufacturer: Vought
- Country of origin: United States

Size
- Height: 22 metres (72 ft)
- Diameter: 1.02 metres (3 ft 4 in)
- Mass: 17,000 kilograms (37,000 lb)
- Stages: Four

Associated rockets
- Family: Scout

Launch history
- Status: Retired
- Launch sites: Point Arguello LC-D
- Total launches: 1
- Failure(s): 1
- UTC date of spacecraft launch: 1963-09-27

First stage – Algol 1D
- Powered by: 1 solid
- Maximum thrust: 440 kilonewtons (99,000 lb_{f})
- Burn time: 44 seconds
- Propellant: Solid

Second stage – Castor 1A
- Powered by: 1 solid
- Maximum thrust: 286 kilonewtons (64,000 lb_{f})
- Specific impulse: 247 sec
- Burn time: 27 seconds
- Propellant: Solid

Third stage – Antares 2A
- Powered by: 1 X-254
- Maximum thrust: 93 kilonewtons (21,000 lb_{f})
- Specific impulse: 293 sec
- Burn time: 36 seconds
- Propellant: Solid

Fourth stage – Altair 2A
- Powered by: 1 X-258
- Maximum thrust: 22 kilonewtons (4,900 lb_{f})
- Specific impulse: 266 sec
- Burn time: 28 seconds
- Propellant: Solid

The Scout X-2B was an American expendable launch system which was flown during 1963. It was a four-stage rocket, based on the earlier Scout X-2, but with an Altair 2A fourth stage in place of the Altair 1A used on the X-2. It was a member of the Scout family of rockets.

The Scout X-2 was an all-solid rocket, with an Algol 1D first stagea Castor 1A second stage, an Antares 2A third stage, and an Altair 2A fourth stage. It made only one flight, which was launched from Launch Complex D at Point Arguello, carrying a P-35 weather satellites, P35-5. The launch occurred on 27 September 1963, and failed to achieve orbit.
