= ORBIS (USAF satellite) =

Series of American satellites

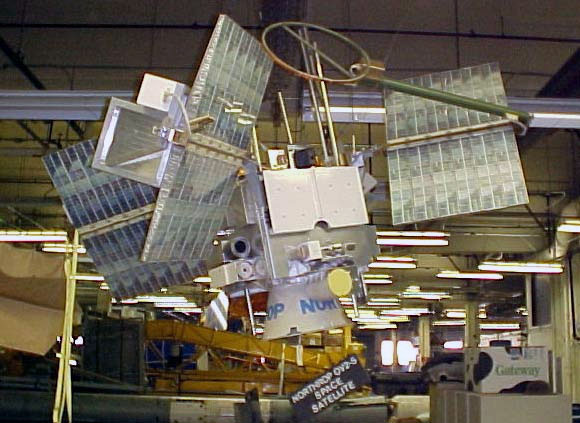
- OV2-5 satellite (carried ORBIS high beacon)
- Manufacturer: Air Force Cambridge Research Laboratories
- Country of origin: United States
- Operator: United States Air Force
- Applications: Satellite Communications

Specifications
- Spacecraft type: Small satellite
- Launch mass: varied

Production
- Status: Retired
- Launched: 6+ (4 successful)
- Maiden launch: Before 18 November 1964
- Last launch: 24 March 1969

ORBIS (Orbiting Radio Beacon Ionospheric Satellite) was a project of the Air Force Cambridge Research Laboratories that investigated ionospheric ducting for the purpose of long-distance satellite communications. ORBIS radio beacons were orbited on stand-alone satellites or included as experiments on other satellites between 1964 and 1969.

== Background ==
=== Ionospheric ducting ===
In Earth's ionosphere, when there a lesser electron density sandwiched between two maxima, a propagation duct can be created. Satellite signals emitted and "trapped" within the highly refractive sides of this duct may propagate thousands of kilometers. Indeed, the low frequency signals of the early Sputniks, for example, were frequently heard by ground stations when the satellites were on the opposite side of the Earth from them (a similar phenomenon happens acoustically in the Earth's oceans, allowing distress signals to be heard several thousand kilometers away.) It was believed that stable propagation ducts for frequencies between 30 and 50 MHz might exist around the entire Earth, allowing for extremely long range communications.

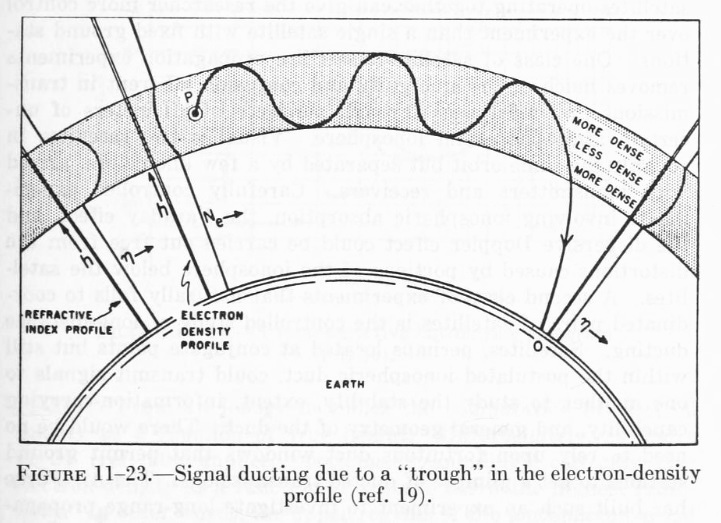
Diagram depicting atmospheric ducting of radio signals

=== Satellite program ===
The United States Air Force sponsored the ORBIS (Orbiting Radio Beacon Ionospheric Satellite) experiments, intended to explore these ionospheric ducts. ORBIS beacons operating continuously on two frequencies, one above the daytime plasma frequency and one below were monitored by a dozen or more ground stations. As the satellite position was well known, the presence of ducting was indicated when signals were picked up far from the source where "windows" in the duct were present.

Similar beacon experiments, under the code name "Nora Alice," were built by the University of Illinois and carried on Discoverer 32 and Discoverer 36 in 1961 and 1962.

== Missions ==
ORBIS beacons were carried on dedicated satellites and included in the experiment packages of other satellites. All ORBIS beacon satellites were launched in multi-satellite missions. (see launch summary below).

=== ORBIS ===
After one launch failure on March 24, a stand-alone ORBIS satellite was put into a low orbit on 18 November 1964. It transmitted on 10.004 MHz for about two weeks, until it reentered the atmosphere. Observed at many locations throughout the world, the AFCRL observatories in Massachusetts noted (a) extremely long-range propagation observed from the northwest near and after local sunrise, the signals cutting off as the satellite passed below the horizon to the south, and (b) during the post-midnight hours, long range propagation was observed beyond-the-horizon from the south. Stations at Urbana, Illinois and St. Louis, Missouri noted similar effects. Europe-based stations, managed by members of the Joint Satellite Studies Group, noted general agreement with the U.S.A. overhead observations, but because of high local interference, did not detect much long-range propagation. The general conclusion was that the southern and equatorial regions of the Earth seemed far more favorable to long-range propagation, especially for signals propagated from the Northern Hemisphere during the midnight hours.

=== Orbiting Vehicle ===
The program was later split into ORBIS Low and ORBIS High, with low and high referring to satellite altitude. Satellite OV2-5 carried eleven experiments, one of which was an ORBIS High transmitter. OV2-5 was launched into a synchronous altitude orbit in September 1968.

OV4-3, a Manned Orbital Laboratory boilerplate, was launched in November 1966. In addition to two other experiments, it carried an ORBIS Low transmitter operating at 5.005, 10.004 and 30.012 MHz. 25 ground stations located around the world were involved in this mission. It operated for one month and reentered the atmosphere in 9 January 1967.

=== ORBISCAL ===
ORBISCAL (ORBIS Calibration), also called OV1-17A, had two transmitters, operating at 8.98 and 13.25 MHz. It broadcast for one week between launch and reentry in March 1969. It was a reflight of ORBISCAL 1, lost in a 12-satellite Atlas-Burner launch failure in August 1968. Stations at Thule and at Sagamore Hill Radio Observatory, Massachusetts frequently recorded propagation ranges of 20,000 kilometers during both day and night hours.

== Launches ==
Name	Launch date	International Designator	Other names	Launch vehicle
ORBIS 1	24 March 1964	F00297		Thrust Augmented Thor SLV-2A Agena-d
ORBIS	18 November 1964	A00587	KH-4A 1014	Thrust Augmented Thor SLV-2A Agena-D
OV2-5	26 September 1968	S03428		Titan_IIIC
OV4-3	3 November 1966	1966-099A	OPS 0855	Titan_IIIC
ORBISCAL 1 (failed launch)	16 August 1968			Atlas SLV-3 Burner-2
ORBISCAL 2	18 March 1969	1969-025D	OV1-17A	Atlas F

There may have been other, classified ORBIS flights prior to 1967.
