= Antares 2 =

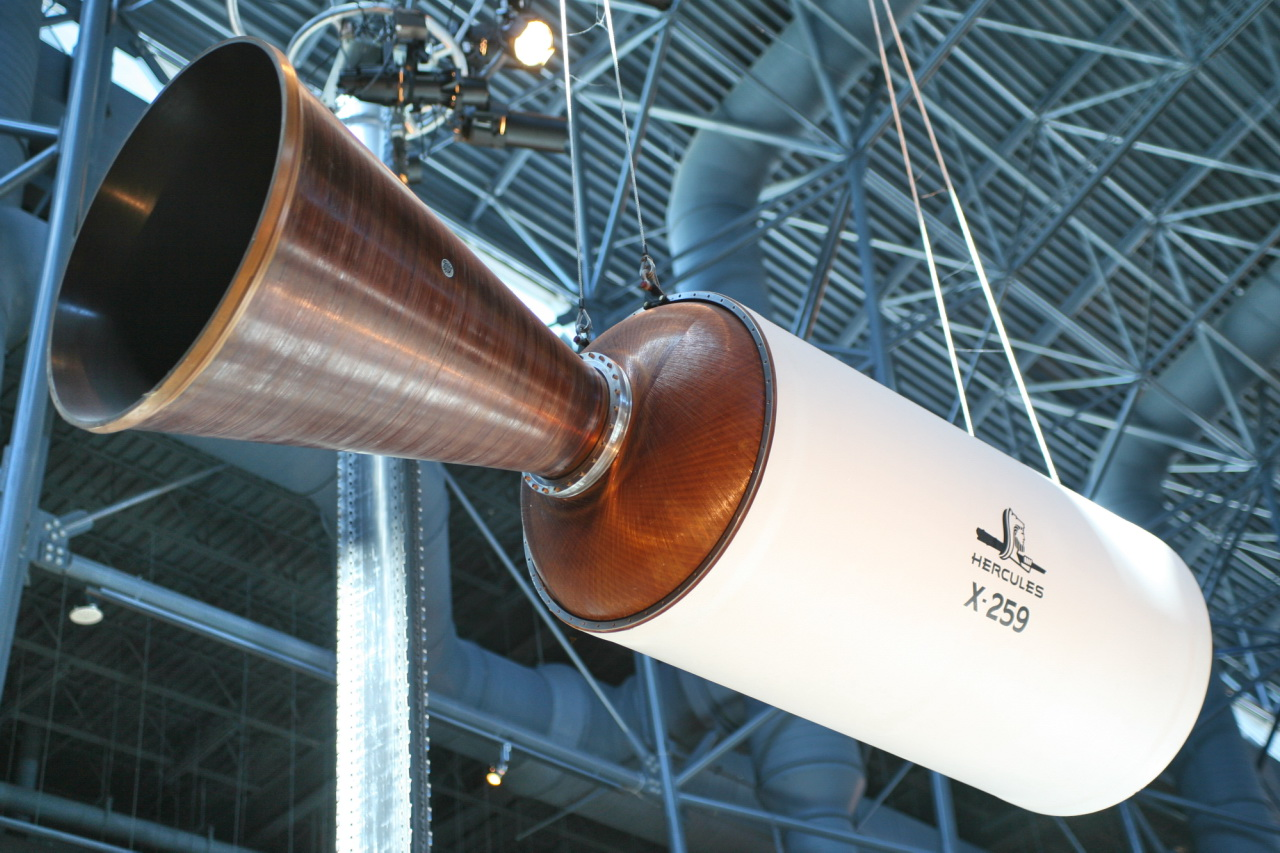
Antares X-259 rocket stage

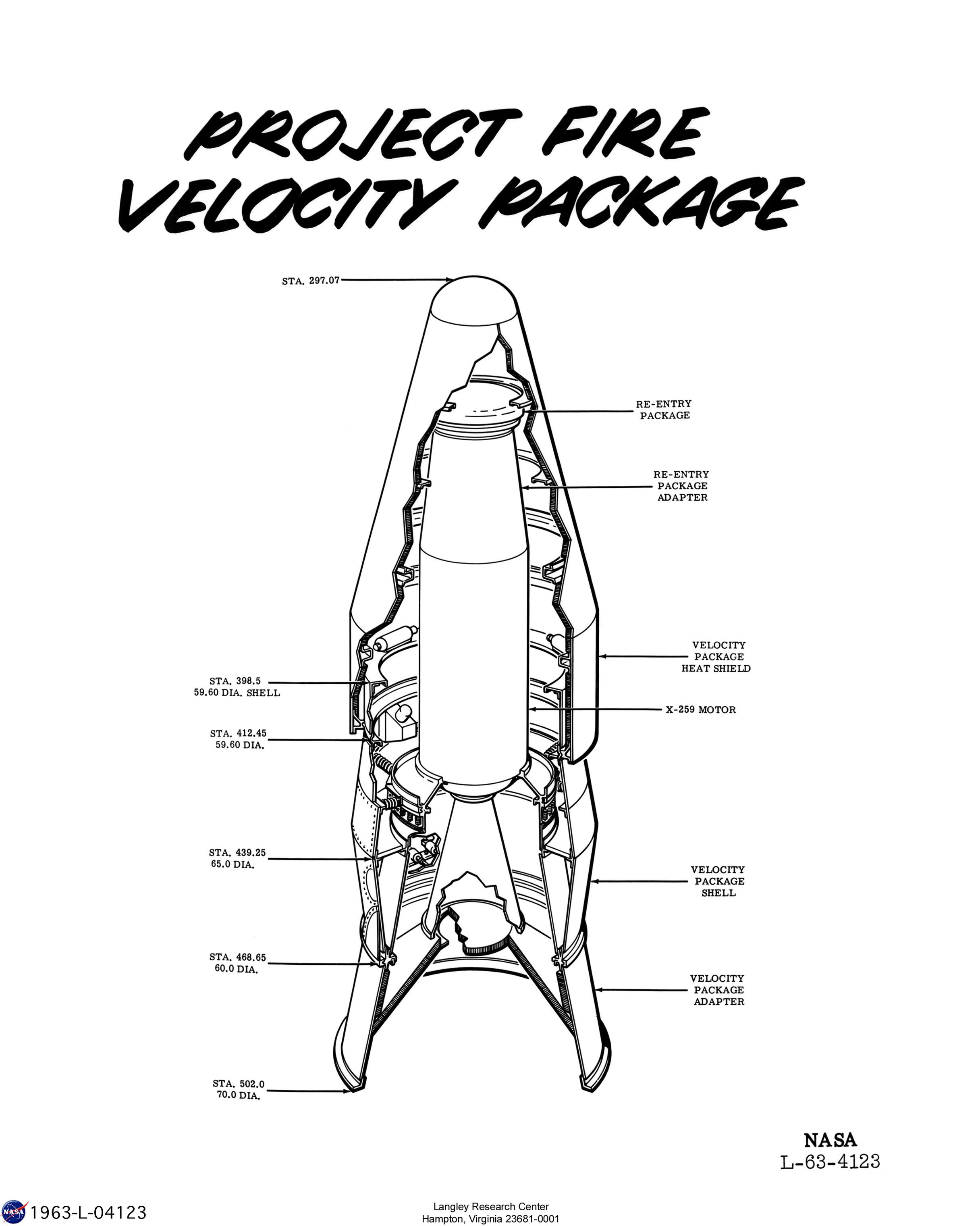
Project FIRE Velocity Package diagram, with the Antares X-259 visible.

Antares 2 (X-259) was an American solid-fueled rocket stage built by Hercules/ABL/Thiokol that used a cast, aluminized, double-base solid propellant containing nitrocellulose. It was used from the mid-1960s to 1995, in the Scout and Strypi family of rockets, and on the Project FIRE Velocity Packages, and was used about 96 times.

== Details ==
Basic details of the X-259 stage:

- Thrust: 93.10 kN (20,930 lb_{f})
- Gross mass: 1,400 kg (3,100 lb)
- Unfuelled mass: 300 kg (660 lb)
- Specific impulse: 293 s.
- Specific impulse sea level: 233 s.
- Burn time: 36 s.
- Height: 2.9 m (9.5 ft)
- Diameter: 0.76 m (2.5 ft)

== Variants ==
There were various variants:

- Antares 2 was used on Scout X-2 1C, B 2A, B-1 F, D-1 F and D; Strypi Tomahawk, XI and IX; SPARTA and Athena H
- Antares 2A was used on Scout-X2, X2B, X2M, X3, X3A, X3C, X3M, X4, X4A, X5C, A, A1, B, B1, C, and D1; and Project FIRE;
- Antares 2B was used on Scout-A2, B2, E1 and Scout-F1.
