= OV2-5 =

US Air Force satellite

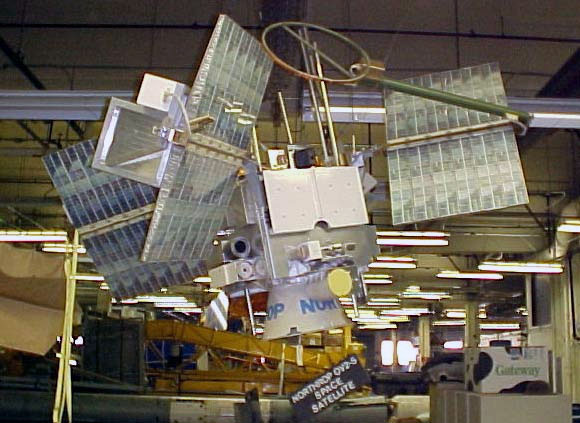
- OV2-5 satellite mock-up donated by Northrop to the National Museum of the U.S. Air Force
- Mission type: particle science
- Operator: USAF
- COSPAR ID: 1968-081A
- SATCAT no.: S03428

Spacecraft properties
- Manufacturer: Northrop
- Launch mass: 204 kg (450 lb)

Start of mission
- Launch date: 26 September 1968, 07:37:01 UTC
- Rocket: Titan IIIC
- Launch site: Cape Canaveral LC41

Orbital parameters
- Reference system: Geocentric
- Regime: Geosynchronous
- Perigee altitude: 35,064 km (21,788 mi)
- Apogee altitude: 35,797 km (22,243 mi)
- Inclination: 3.0 °
- Period: 1,417.9 minutes
- Epoch: 26 November 1968

Orbiting Vehicle 2-5 (COSPAR ID: 1968-081A, also known as OV2-5), the third and last satellite of the second series of the United States Air Force's Orbiting Vehicle program, was an American particle science and ionosphere research satellite. Launched 26 September 1968 along with three other satellites, OV2-5 became the first scientific satellite to operate at geosynchronous altitude.

== Background ==
The Orbiting Vehicle satellite program arose from a US Air Force initiative, begun in the early 1960s, to reduce the expense of space research. Through this initiative, satellites would be standardized to improve reliability and cost-efficiency, and where possible, they would fly on test vehicles or be piggybacked with other satellites. In 1961, the Air Force Office of Aerospace Research (OAR) created the Aerospace Research Support Program (ARSP) to request satellite research proposals and choose mission experiments. The USAF Space and Missiles Organization created their own analog of the ARSP called the Space Experiments Support Program (SESP), which sponsored a greater proportion of technological experiments than the ARSP. Five distinct OV series of standardized satellites were developed under the auspices of these agencies.

The OV2 series of satellites was originally designed as part of the ARENTS (Advanced Research Environmental Test Satellite) program, intended to obtain supporting data for the Vela satellites, which monitored the Earth for violations of the 1963 Partial Test Ban Treaty. Upon the cancellation of ARENTS due to delays in the Centaur rocket stage, the program's hardware (developed by General Dynamics) was repurposed to fly on the Titan III (initially the A, ultimately the C) booster test launches. The USAF contracted Northrop to produce these satellites, with William C. Armstrong of Northrop Space Laboratories serving as the program manager.

The first satellite in the OV2 series, OV2-1, was launched 15 October 1965 with a suite of radiation measuring experiments; it was lost when its booster broke up in orbit. The next satellite in the series, OV2-2, was to carry out optical measurements from an altitude of 400 kilometres (250 mi), but the mission was cancelled when the Titan III test schedule was truncated. Instead, OV2-3, with several solar experiments, was scheduled for the next Titan III launch.

OV2-3, along with LES-3, LES-4, and OSCAR 4, was launched on a Titan IIIC on 22 December 1965, but the Transtage carrying the satellites never made its final burn to finalize the geosynchronous orbit. Though the other satellites attached separated and returned data, OV2-3 remained attached and did not operate. OV2-4, which would have left Earth's orbit to conduct measurements, was deleted from the schedule like OV2-2.

OV2-5, originally planned for launch in Spring of 1967, had the largest equipment loadout of the OV2 series. In addition to duplicating OV2-1's radiation detection capabilities, it also could conduct ionospheric radio transmission tests and measure the Lyman-alpha hydrogen emission background. The Titan IIIC launch failure on 26 August 1966 caused the rescheduling of OV2-5's flight for 1968.

== Spacecraft design ==
The 204 kg (450 lb) OV2-5 was built to the configuration standard to all of the OV2 satellites, with a roughly cubical structure of aluminum honeycomb, .61 m (2.0 ft) in height, and .58 m (1.9 ft) wide. Four 2.3 m (7.5 ft) paddle-like solar panels, each with 20,160 solar cells, were mounted at the four upper corners of the main body. The power system, which included NiCd batteries for night-time operations, provided 63 W of power.

As with the other craft in the OV2 series, experiments were generally mounted outside the cube while satellite systems, including tape recorder, command receiver, and PAM/FM/FM telemetry system, were installed inside. Four small solid rocket motors spun, one on each paddle, were designed to spin the OV2 satellites upon reaching orbit, providing gyroscopic stability. Cold-gas jets maintained this stability, receiving information on the satellite's alignment with respect to the Sun via an onboard solar aspect sensor, and with respect to the local magnetic field via two onboard fluxgate magnetometers. A damper kept the satellite from precessing (wobbling around its spin axis). Passive thermal control kept the satellite from overheating. OV2-5 was designed for a lifespan of at least one year.

== Experiments ==
OV2-5 carried 11 experiments, most of which were designed to measure charged particles and magnetic fields around the spacecraft. The satellite also carried the ORBIS-High Ionospheric radio beacon, a VLF receiver, as well as a scanning ultra-violet photometer to measure the Lyman-alpha hydrogen emission background.

== Mission and results ==
OV2-5, along with OV5-2, OV5-4, and LES 6, was successfully launched via Titan IIIC from Cape Canaveral LC41 at 07:37:01 UTC and ultimately delivered to an altitude of 22,000 mi (35,000 km) making it the first ever scientific geosynchronous satellite. Though seven of the 12 experiment appendages failed to deploy, most of the satellite's experiments returned useful data.

Proton energy data collected 2–13 October 1968 in the energy range of 0.060 to 3.3 Mev showed an eight-fold reduction in particle flux between solar storms and quiet periods. Measuring the angle at which protons encountered the satellite also helped refine theoretical models of how the magnetosphere interacts with the flux of charged particles.

OV2-5 was originally released into a geostationary orbit, but as it lacked a system for maintaining an orbit, it gradually slipped into a geosynchronous orbit, where it and its Transtage still remain (as of June 2021).
