= SM-65D Atlas =

First operational version of the U.S. Atlas missile

Atlas D (SM-65D)
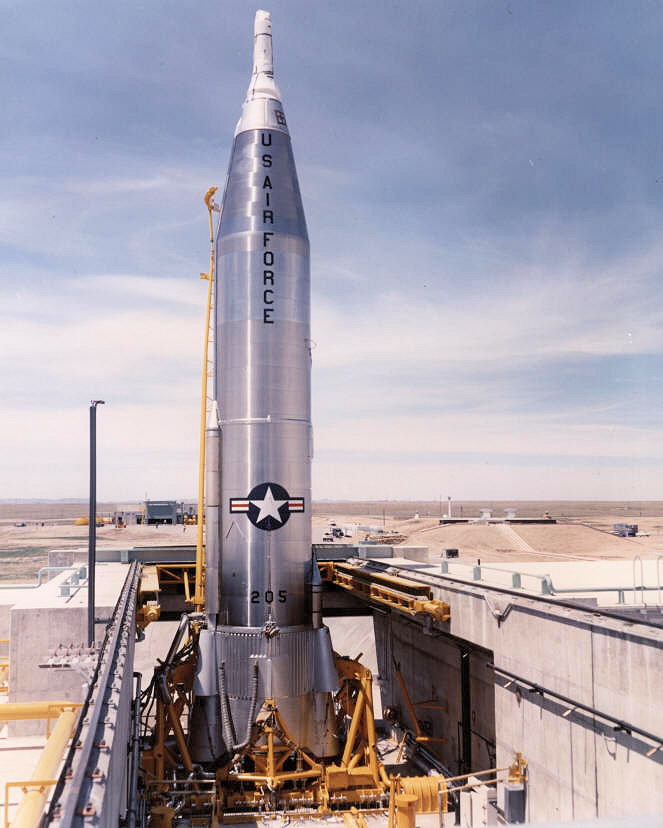
- 564th Strategic Missile Squadron Convair SM-65D Atlas missile 58-220, pad 564-A2, Warren I site, F. E. Warren AFB, Wyoming
- Function: ICBM; Expendable launch system
- Manufacturer: Convair / General Dynamics
- Country of origin: United States

Size
- Height: 25.15 metres (82.51 ft)
- Diameter: 3.0 metres (10.0 ft)
- Mass: 119,000 kilograms (262,000 lb)
- Stages: 1½

Capacity

Payload to LEO
- Mass: 1,400 kg (3,100 lb)

Launch history
- Status: Retired
- Launch sites: LC-11, 12, 13 & 14, CCAFS; LC-576, VAFB
- Total launches: 135
- Success(es): 103
- Failure: 32
- First flight: 14 April 1959
- Last flight: 7 November 1967

Boosters
- No. boosters: 1
- Engines: 2 Rocketdyne XLR-89-5
- Thrust: 1,517.4 kilonewtons (341,130 lbf)
- Burn time: 135 seconds
- Propellant: RP-1/LOX

First stage
- Engines: 1 Rocketdyne XLR-105-5
- Thrust: 363.22 kilonewtons (81,655 lbf)
- Burn time: 5 minutes
- Propellant: RP-1/LOX

The SM-65D Atlas, or Atlas D, was the first operational version of the U.S. Atlas missile. Atlas D was first used as an intercontinental ballistic missile (ICBM) to deliver a nuclear weapon payload on a suborbital trajectory. It was later developed as a launch vehicle to carry a payload to low Earth orbit on its own, and later to geosynchronous orbit, to the Moon, Venus, or Mars with the Agena or Centaur upper stage.

Atlas D was launched from Cape Canaveral Air Force Station, at Launch Complexes 11, 12, 13 and 14, and Vandenberg Air Force Base at Launch Complex 576.

The fully operational D-series Atlas was similar to the R&D model Atlas B and C, but incorporated a number of design changes implemented as a result of lessons learned during test flights. In addition, the D-series had the full-up Rocketdyne MA-2 propulsion system with 360,000 pounds-force (1,600 kN) of thrust versus the 250,000 pounds-force (1,100 kN) of thrust in the Atlas B/C's engines. Operational Atlas D missiles retained radio ground guidance aside from a few R&D launches which tested the inertial guidance system designed for the Atlas E/F, and the Atlas D would be the basis for most space launcher variants of Atlas.

== History ==
=== 1959 ===
"Atlas: The ICBM" (1957) De-classified USAF information film reel.

"On Target, The Atlas ICBM" (1959) De-classified USAF information film reel.

The Atlas D testing program began with the launch of Missile 3D from LC-13 on April 14, 1959. Engine startup proceeded normally, but it quickly became apparent that the LOX fill/drain valve had not closed properly. LOX spilled around the base of the thrust section, followed by leakage from the RP-1 fill/drain valve. The propellants then mixed and exploded on the launch stand. Because of the open LOX fill/drain valve, the Atlas's propellant system suffered a loss of fuel flow and pressure that caused the B-2 engine to operate at only 65% thrust. Due to the imbalanced thrust, the Atlas lifted at a slanted angle, which also prevented one of the launcher hold-down arms from retracting properly. Subsequent film review showed that no apparent damage to the missile resulted from either the launcher release or the propellant explosion. The flight control system managed to retain missile stability until T+26 seconds when the loss of pressure to the LOX feed system ruptured propellant ducting and resulted in an explosion that caused the booster section to rip away from the missile. The Atlas sank backwards through its own trail of fire until the Range Safety destruct command was issued at T+36 seconds. The sustainer and verniers continued operating until missile destruction. All other missile systems had functioned well during the brief flight and the LOX fill/drain valve malfunction was attributed to a breakdown of the butterfly actuator shaft, possibly during the Pre-Flight Readiness Firing a few weeks earlier, so Atlas vehicles starting with Missile 26D would use an actuator made of steel rather than aluminum. The leakage from the fuel fill/drain valve was traced to an improper procedure during the prelaunch countdown and was not connected to the LOX fill/drain valve problem. LC-13 sustained some damage due to the anomalous liftoff of Atlas 3D, this was quickly repaired and preparations began for the launch of Missile 5D.

On May 18, Atlas 7D was prepared for a night launch of an RVX-2 reentry vehicle from LC-14, the second attempt to fly one after the launch of a C-series Atlas had miscarried two months earlier. The test was conducted with the Mercury astronauts in attendance in order to showcase the vehicle that would take them into orbit, but 64 seconds of flight ended in another explosion, prompting Gus Grissom to remark "Are we really going to get on top of one of those things?" This failure was traced to improper separation of the right launcher hold-down pin, which damaged the B-2 nacelle structure and caused helium pressurization gas to escape during ascent. At 62 seconds into the launch, the pressure in the LOX tank exceeded the pressure in the RP-1 tank, which reversed the intermediate bulkhead. Two seconds later, the missile exploded. Film review confirmed that the hold-down pin on the right launcher arm failed to retract at liftoff and was jerked from the missile. The resultant force caused a four-inch gap in the B-2 nacelle structure which also damaged low-pressure helium lines. The hold-down pin had not retracted due to a sheared retaining bolt in the bell crank pulley system in the right launcher arm. Once again, all other systems in the Atlas functioned well and there were no problems not directly attributable to the launcher malfunction. The flight of 7D resulted in improved maintenance procedures for the launcher equipment at CCAS and use of higher heat steel in the bell crank retaining bolts.

Atlas 5D lifted from LC-13 on June 6. The flight went perfectly until booster separation, at which point a fuel leak started. Tank pressure decreased until the intermediate bulkhead reversed at T+157 seconds and the missile exploded. This incident was similar in nature to an Atlas C failure earlier in the year and it resulted in a major investigation and redesign effort. The failure point was either the fuel staging disconnect valve or associated plumbing, and modifications were made to the disconnect valve, plumbing, booster separation system, jettison tracks, and even the launcher mechanism, all of which were possible causes of the malfunction. On July 29, Missile 11D was launched with a series of modifications designed to correct problems on previous Atlas launches. The flight was mostly successful and booster section separation was performed successfully on a D-series Atlas for the first time, but some difficulties with the hydraulic system occurred due to low engine compartment temperatures caused by a probable LOX leak. Missile 14D launched from LC-13 on August 11, at which point the Air Force somewhat reluctantly declared the Atlas to be operational as a missile system. On September 9, Missile 12D launched from Vandenberg Air Force Base, marking the first Atlas flight from the West Coast. Eight more D-series ICBM tests were conducted in 1959, as well as two space launches using Atlas D vehicles. Although assorted minor failures and hardware bugs affected these flights, the overall success rate was a major improvement over the first half of the year.

Missile 26D on October 29 experienced a premature shutdown of the V-1 vernier when interference from the onboard camera package caused temporary loss of ground guidance lock on the missile. Impact occurred 16 miles (26 km) short of the target point.

Because of growing confidence in the Atlas, it was decided to abandon PFRF (Pre-Flight Readiness Firing) tests except for the first handful of Atlas E flights as well as space launches. The final test of 1959, Missile 40D on December 19, utilized a "dry" start method (no inert fluid in the engine tubes). This experiment worked without any apparent problems. The first four Atlas flights of 1960, three CCAS and one VAFB launch, were largely successful. On 6D, several malfunctions of the ground guidance system occurred—spurious yaw commands were sent at T+175 seconds and ground guidance lock on the missile was lost for almost two minutes. The missile continued to be unstable in flight for the first 14 seconds of vernier solo phase. Furthermore, an erroneous VECO signal was sent at T+278 seconds but the missile programmer did not act on it due to an apparent open circuit. VECO was intended to take place at T+282 seconds but did not occur for the aforementioned reason and it was instead performed 12 seconds later by a backup signal generated by the programmer. The missile landed within 9 miles (14 km) of the target area.

=== 1960 ===
On March 5, 1960, Missile 19D was undergoing a propellant loading exercise at 576-A2 at VAFB when a fuel leak started a fire on the pad that led to the explosion of the missile. The launch facility was written off due to the damage and not used again for almost 5 years.

On March 8, 1960, Missile 44D launched from LC-11 on the first test of the AIG (All Inertial Guidance System) and experienced a 90° roll transient at liftoff. The AIG managed to correct this problem and the missile completed a successful 3,000 miles (4,800 km) lob downrange.

With this string of successful Atlas tests, program officials were lulled into a sense of security that rudely ended on March 11 when Atlas 51D lifted from LC-13. The B-1 engine suffered combustion instability which caused loss of thrust within two seconds of liftoff. An explosion ripped apart the thrust section, followed by structural failure of the propellant tanks, causing the Atlas to fall back onto LC-13 in an enormous fireball. The Atlas went in for a repeat performance on April 8 when Missile 48D, launched from LC-11 and intended as the first closed-loop test of the AIG (All Inertial Guidance System), experienced combustion instability again, this time in the B-2 engine. The first indication of trouble was a pressure surge in the B-2 combustion chamber, followed by unstable thrust, engine shutdown, and an explosion that started a thrust section fire. The B-1 engine then shut down, followed by the sustainer and verniers. Since the propulsion system had not attained sufficient thrust, the launcher hold-down mechanism did not release the missile, which stayed in place and burned on the pad. The thrust section fire slowed down 15 seconds after the attempted launch, then resumed around 45 seconds. At 60 seconds, the Atlas was completely destroyed when the propellant tanks exploded.

Postflight analysis of the back-to-back failures found that in each case, the missile had fallen victim to rough combustion in one booster engine, which destroyed the LOX injector head (the injector damage on 51D was more extensive than 48D) and started a thrust section fire. In both missiles, the rough combustion cutoff sensor in the B-1 engine failed to operate. On 48D, the rough combustion did not occur in that engine and the lack of RCC cutoff was not a problem (B-1 thrust was terminated instead by the turbopump overspeed sensor). The B-2 RCC sensor operated correctly and terminated thrust before liftoff could be achieved. On 51D, it resulted in the B-1 continuing to operate until the missile lifted, resulting in a destructive pad fallback. The exact reason for the rough combustion was unclear, although it had occurred over a dozen times in static firing tests of the MA-2 engines. However, it was noted that the separate exhaust duct for the gas generator vent pipe had been removed from both LC-11 and LC-13 after engineers decided that it was unnecessary and impeded removal and installation of protective covers on the pipe during ground testing. It could not be determined with certainty if the lack of an exhaust duct had anything to do with the failures, and in any case, camera coverage did not offer any evidence in support of this theory. Nonetheless, it was decided to put the exhaust duct back on the Atlas pads at CCAS in order to comply with the configuration of operational Atlas missile silos, and as a "just in case" measure. Adjustments to the insulation boots on both missile was also ruled out as a probable cause of the failures. Aside from re-installing the exhaust duct, camera coverage of the flame deflector pit at ignition would also be increased and greater efforts made to ensure that the booster engines were free of contaminants. An added backup accelerometer was added to the RCC sensors in case of a failure. Two launch facilities were now in need of repair. LC-13 was severely damaged by the fallback of 51D and would not be used again for six months, while damage to LC-11 was less extensive and repairs were completed in only two months. After restoration, LC-13 was converted for the Atlas E and would not host further D-series tests. Attention shifted to LC-12 where Atlas 56D flew over 9,000 miles (14,000 km) with an instrumented nose cone, impacting the Indian Ocean.

After the back-to-back pad explosions, it was decided to go back to using a wet start (inert fluid in the engine tubes) on the Atlas rather than the failed experiment of a dry start to ensure smoother engine startup. Atlas 56D (launched on May 20) was the first East Coast launch following 48D and it incorporated the modifications to the launch facilities along with cameras mounted on both launcher heads to look down into the nacelle sections at liftoff, as well as being the first flight from LC-12 in nine months as the pad had suffered major damage in the explosion of Atlas 9C the previous September. This was followed by Atlas 45D, an Agena vehicle used to launch a MIDAS satellite.

Missile 54D launched successfully from LC-11, now repaired from the explosion of 48D, on June 11. This was followed by 62D on June 22 which marked the first dry engine start since 48D, as well as the first test of the Mercury ASIS system. The flight was largely successful however an open circuit resulted in the programmer not receiving the VECO discrete from the guidance system at the intended T+300 seconds. A backup command from the programmer performed VECO eight seconds later, consequently the RV landed 18 miles (28 km) further downrange than intended. The next flight, Missile 27D on June 28, was successful.

Missile 60D launched July 2. The vernier start tanks were inadvertently vented and refilled several times during the flight. This resulted in depletion of control helium and decay in propulsion system performance, and so the Mark III Mod 1B reentry vehicle landed some 40 miles (64 km) short of its intended target point. An electrical short in the engine relay control box was suspected.

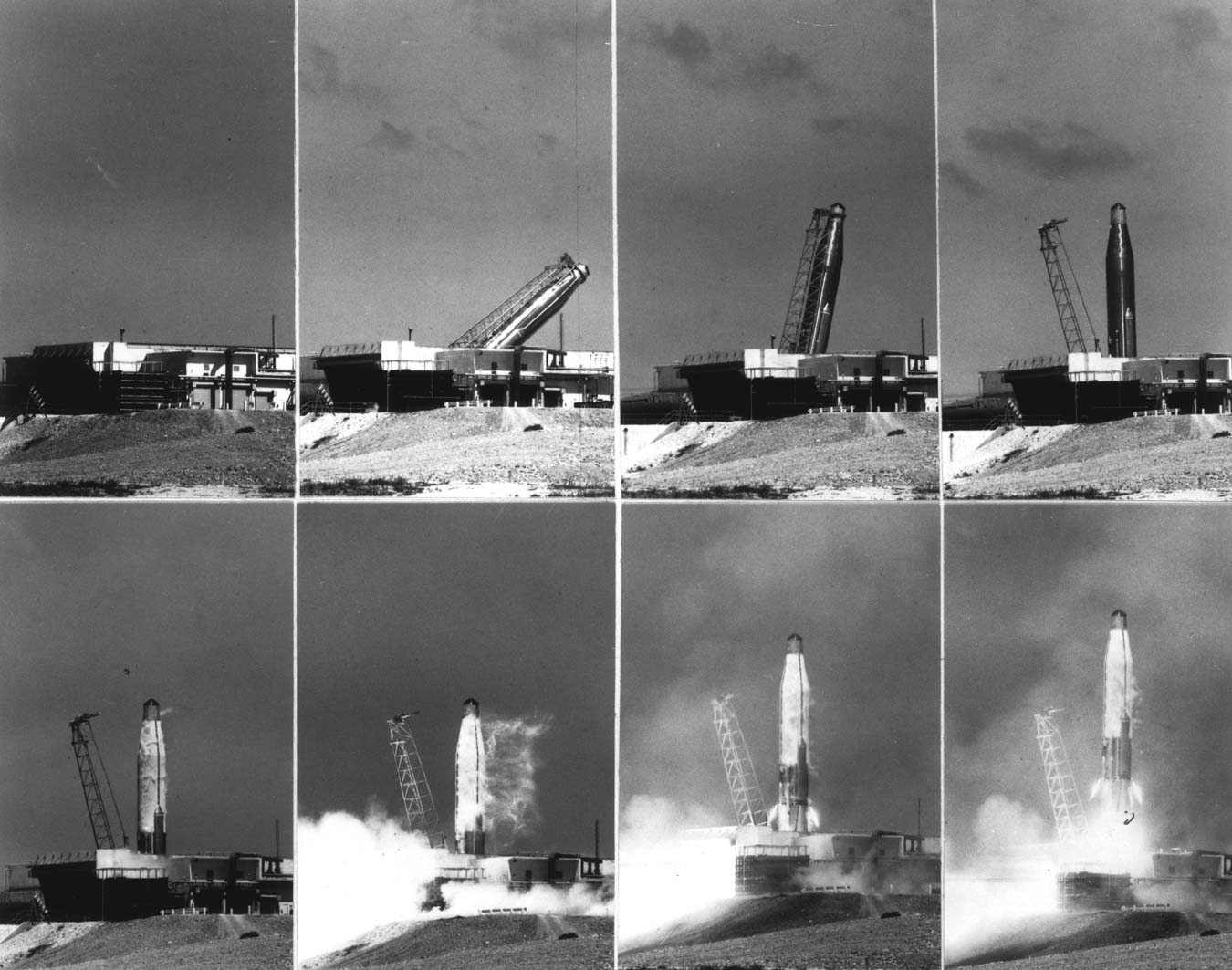
Atlas 25D is shown in a sequence of images being erected and launched.

Atlas D tests on the West Coast hit a series of snags in the following months as well when IOC testing began. Atlas 25D had flown successfully on April 22 from 576B-1, a coffin silo, after delays following the postflight findings from 51D and 48D. The next attempt was 23D on May 6. Following a normal liftoff, control began to fail the moment the pitch and roll sequence began at T+21 seconds. The missile performed a couple of cartwheels before the Range Safety destruct command was sent at T+26 seconds. This failure was attributed to wiring in the pitch gyro contacting the casing and shorting out the gyro motor. The guidance system rate beacon also failed at liftoff, thus it would have been impossible to transmit any discrete guidance commands to the missile had the flight continued. Atlas 74D (July 22) broke up 70 seconds into launch due to a failure of the pitch gyro either due to an improper motor speed setting or torquing signals. Missile 47D (September 12) lost sustainer thrust starting at T+220 seconds due to an apparent loss of helium control pressure to the gas generator. The sustainer completely shut down at T+268 seconds and the missile fell 480 miles (772 km) short of the target area. Making postflight analysis difficult was a major loss of telemetry data at T+109 seconds caused by a power failure, consequently only 13 telemetry measurements remained active for the rest of the flight. Missile 33D (September 29) failed to stage its booster section when the staging electrical disconnect plug pulled out at T+125 seconds; it impacted 1,200 miles (1,900 km) short of the target area. 81D (October 13) failed when the LOX quick disconnect pressure sensor malfunctioned due to the loss of a heat shield at liftoff. As a consequence, the tank pressurization system mistakenly sensed a drop in tank pressure and began pumping helium into the tanks to raise their pressure level. Pressures in both propellant tanks began rising at T+39 seconds and the missile self-destructed when excessive LOX tank pressure ruptured the intermediate bulkhead at T+71 seconds.

While attempting to launch Missile 32D from LC-12 on August 2, the sustainer RCC sensor was tripped and an automatic shutdown issued. The sustainer thrust chamber was found to have pinhole leaks in it. It was removed and swapped with a different engine, and 32D was launched successfully seven days later. After this, 66D was launched successfully on August 12 but its RV sank into the ocean and was not recovered.

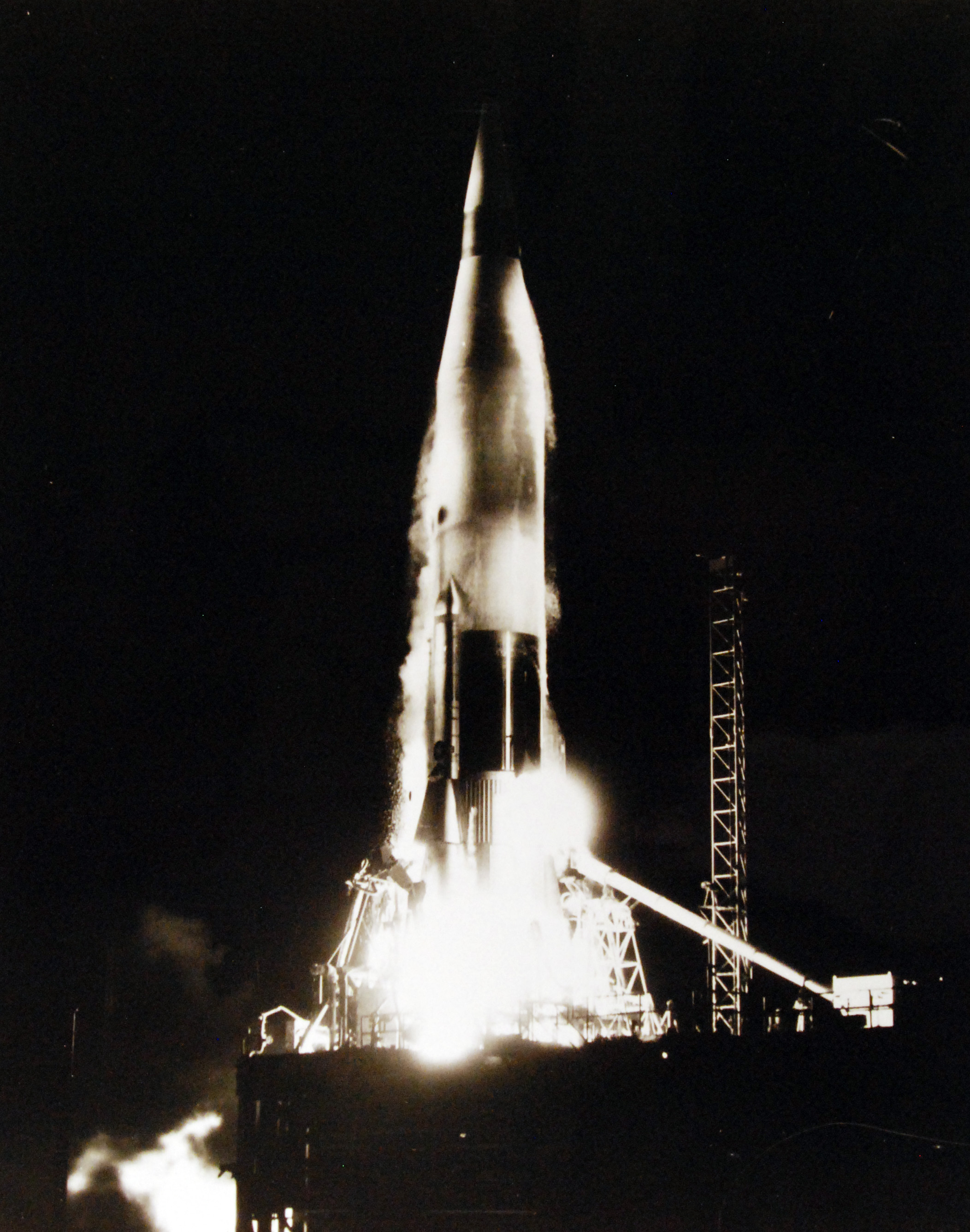
Atlas 71D, 13 October 1960

Five more Atlas D tests from CCAS during the year were successful, these were 76D, 79D, 71D, 55D, and 83D. Missile 79D was the last test flight from LC-14, which had otherwise been turned over to NASA for Project Mercury but the failure of Mercury-Atlas 1 in July caused a lengthy delay between flights and so LC-14 was temporarily free for use. The most notable flight in this stretch was Atlas 71D on October 13 which carried three mice and other experiments in a biological nose cone which successfully completed a 5,000-mile (8,000 km) lob downrange from LC-11 at the Cape. This missile utilized a dry start method without any hold-down time at liftoff with no apparent ill effects and all airborne systems performed well aside from an unexplained decrease in B-1 and sustainer thrust a few seconds before BECO. This was attributed to a probable fuel line obstruction. Cameras mounted on the nose cone photographed the spent Atlas after capsule separation.

=== 1961-62 ===
Atlas 90D, the final R&D flight of a D-series missile, launched successfully from LC-12 on January 23, 1961. Four operational Atlas D flights from VAFB during the year were successful and the first three flights of 1962 also went without a hitch. Atlas 52D launched from 576-B3 at VAFB on February 21, 1962. Abnormal thrust section temperatures occurred early in the flight, and the sustainer and verniers shut down starting at T+49 seconds. The booster engines experienced thrust decay at T+58 seconds followed by complete loss of thrust at T+68 seconds, and missile breakup five seconds later. This failure was traced to a leak in the booster engine gas generator that caused thrust section overheating and loss of engine thrust, and it occurred a mere five hours after John Glenn's Mercury launch, driving home the point that Atlas was still far from a reliable vehicle.

The next flight after 52D was Missile 134D (March 24), witnessed by President Kennedy, who was making a tour of VAFB. Eight successful Atlas D operational flights in a row followed, some of which tested Nike-Zeus target missiles. On October 2, Missile 4D failed when the vernier engines shut down at T+33 seconds due to an inadvertent closure of the propellant valves. The propellant feed system sent all of the propellant intended for the verniers into the sustainer engine, which was overpressurized beyond its structure limits. The sustainer shut down at T+181 seconds, likely due to a rupture from the excessive pressure level, and the missile fell an estimated 2,300 miles (3,700 km) short of its target. Roll control had been maintained by the booster engines following vernier shutdown, then lost after BECO. Three more Atlas D flights during the year were successful.

=== 1963 ===
After the high degree of success achieved in 1962, the flight record of the D-series took a turn for the worse in 1963. The first flight of the year, Missile 39D, lifted from 576-B2 at VABF shortly after midnight on January 25. Beginning at T+86 seconds, the V-2 vernier shut down followed by loss of B-1 engine gimbaling control, telemetry power failure, and booster thrust decay. The sustainer shut down at T+108 seconds and the boosters at T+126 seconds. The missile tumbled, broke up, and impacted about 99 miles (159 km) downrange. Telemetry data revealed abnormally high thrust section temperatures during powered flight; initially a fuel leak and fire were suspected but launch film revealed an improperly attached insulation boot which came off at liftoff. Three Atlas Ds then successfully tested Nike-Zeus target missiles. In March, a series of operational SAC tests were carried out with minimal telemetry to reduce weight and allow the missiles to fly for as long a range as possible—five Atlas D and F flights. The first was 102D launched March 10 from 576-B3. The missile began to tumble out of control shortly after liftoff and self-destructed at T+33 seconds after having performed a 320° loop, showering the area around the pad with flaming debris. Although only a few items were telemetered, the telemetry system failed during the prelaunch countdown anyway and film did not reveal any obvious cause of the control loss, but recovered debris discovered that the pitch gyro was either not running or the rotation speed was too low, and that 102D was still using the old Type B gyro canisters which did not have the Spin Motor Rotation Detection System (SMRD). The SMRD had been conceived back in 1958 after the first Atlas B failed in flight due to an inoperative yaw gyro, but was not phased into Atlas vehicles until 1961. Missile 102D had not been upgraded to the newer Type D gyros which had the SMRD, and a quick examination of the Atlas inventory at VAFB found two more missiles with Type B gyros. They were replaced with spare Type D canisters from Project Mercury.

After the successful flight of 64D on March 12, Missile 46D (March 15) failed when the sustainer hydraulic rise-off heat shield broke off. Radiated heat caused the rise-off disconnect valve to fail, resulting in loss of sustainer engine hydraulic fluid. Sustainer and vernier control failed starting at T+83 seconds, but missile stability was retained until BECO at T+137 seconds. After booster jettison, the missile became unstable in flight. SECO occurred at T+145 seconds and impact occurred approximately 500 miles (804 km) downrange. This incident was a near repeat of a failed Atlas-Agena launch three months earlier, and after another Atlas-Agena the following June fell victim to a hydraulic rise-off heat shield loss, the heat shield was redesigned. Check valves were installed on the hydraulic system of Atlas SLVs, although not ICBMs.

Missile 193D was launched on March 16, part of the normal operational test series with full telemetry as opposed to the "stripped" SAC tests. Missile performance was nominal until T+76 seconds when thrust section temperatures began rising. Pitch stability was lost at T+103 seconds and sustainer hydraulic control failed at T+149 seconds. BECO occurred on time at T+135 seconds, and impact occurred approximately 390 miles (627 km) downrange. This flight resulted in improved installation and stitching for the engine insulation boots. D-series operational tests were suspended for two months while efforts were made to correct the problems experienced during the first few months of 1963. Then 198D carried out a Nike-Zeus test successfully on June 12. Two operational ICBM tests in July–August were also successful.

Missile 63D on September 7 suffered a ruptured vernier hydraulic line from aerodynamic heating at T+110 seconds. The sustainer and verniers shut down just prior to BECO and the mission failed. On September 12, 84D experienced a hydraulic failure in the last few seconds of vernier solo phase and the warhead did not land on target. The missile did not carry temperature probes, but thrust section overheating was suspected. On October 7, Missile 163D exploded at T+75 seconds when the intermediate bulkhead reversed. Postflight investigation found that launch crews had loaded the helium bottles with insufficiently chilled gas, resulting in a lack of helium flow to the propellant tanks, which lost pressure during ascent.

The last operational Atlas D missile test was Missile 158D on November 13. The flight was normal until T+112 seconds when sustainer hydraulic pressure began dropping, followed by missile explosion five seconds later. Because this was the program finale, Convair did not perform a full postflight investigation and the cause of the hydraulic failure was not determined. One more Atlas D was flown in 1963, an ABRES RV test on December 18, successfully.

=== 1964-1967 ===
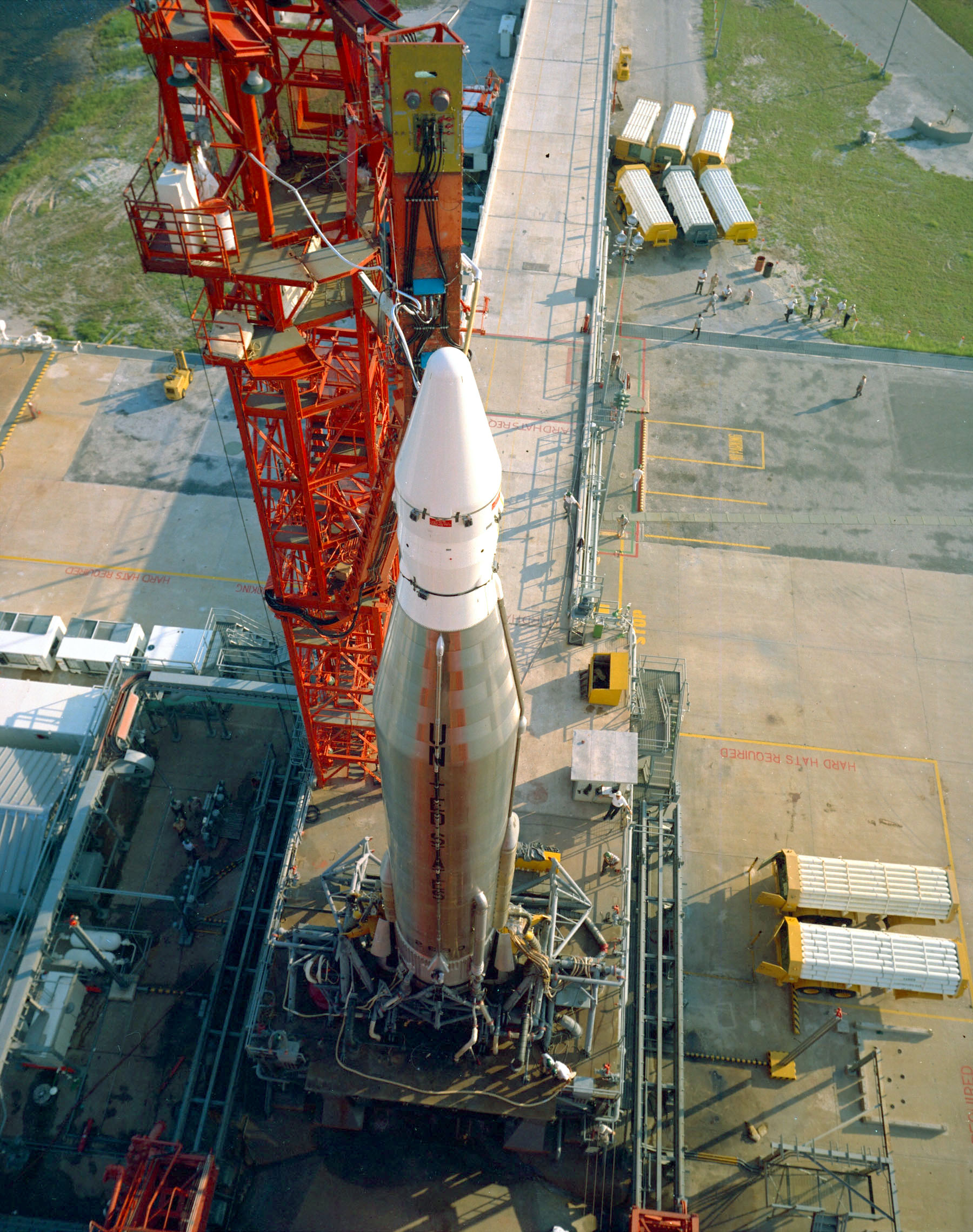
Atlas 263D with Antares upper stage carrying Fire 1 on September 30, 1963

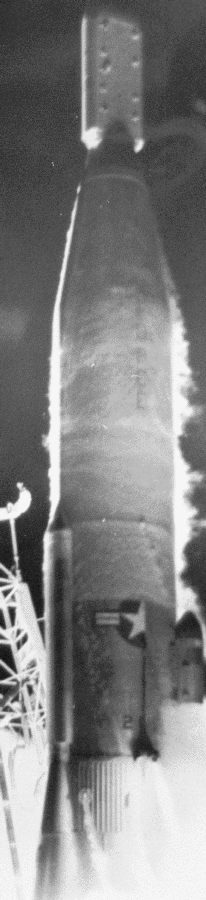
Atlas 34D launches OV1-2 on 5 October 1965

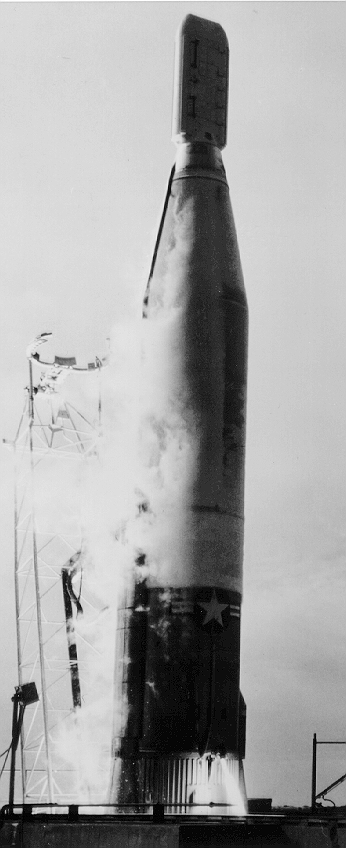
Atlas 89D launches OV1-09 and OV1-10 on December 11 1966

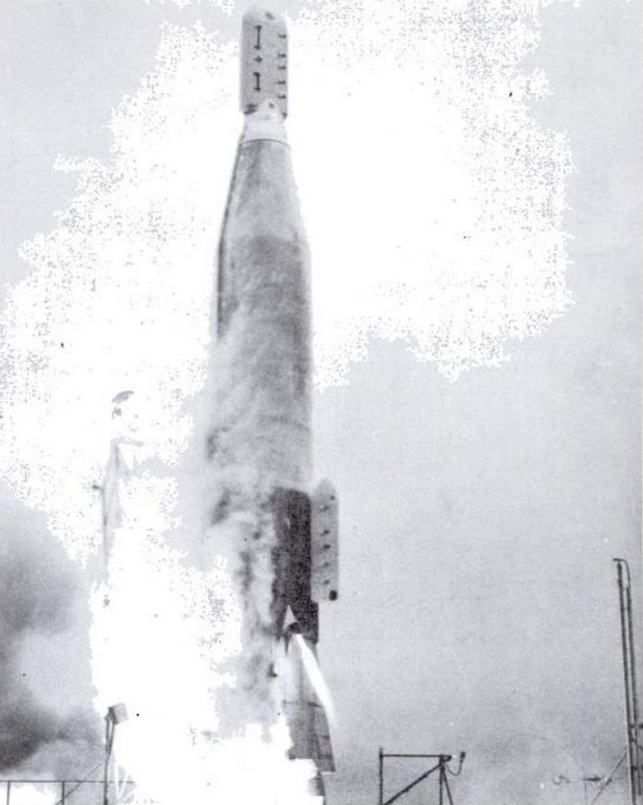
Atlas 92D launches OV1-11, OV1-12, and OV1-86 on 27 July 1967

On April 23, 1964, Missile 263D launched from CCAS LC-12 as part of Project FIRE, a series of suborbital tests designed to verify Apollo command module ablative heat shield material. This was the first suborbital Atlas D flown from the Cape in over three years. Five RV/Nike-Zeus tests from VAFB during the year achieved most of their mission goals.

The Atlas ICBM program concluded in early 1965, however refurbished missiles continued to be flown from VAFB for various orbital and suborbital mission for years afterward. Six successful RV/Nike-Zeus flights were carried out using D-series missiles from January to April 1965. On May 22, the second Project FIRE test was performed from the Cape using Missile 264D.

During 1965, another new program developed, the OV (Orbiting Vehicle) flights, which were a series of experimental scientific pods. The first attempt using Atlas 172D miscarried when an incorrectly set sustainer PU valve caused fuel depletion and premature SECO. The guidance system did not issue the separation command to the pods, which remained attached to the sustainer section as it reentered the atmosphere and burned up. The second attempt, using Missile 68D on May 28, was an even bigger fiasco when a LOX leak during ascent resulted in a thrust section explosion two minutes into launch. Although booster jettison was performed successfully, damage from the explosion resulted in eventual sustainer shutdown and missile self-destruction. Afterwards, it was decided that suborbital flights were insufficient for the OV program and that full orbital tests were needed.

There were eleven more Atlas D launches in 1965, ten ABRES/Nike-Zeus tests and OV 1–2 on October 5. All of these were successful.

Fourteen Atlas Ds were launched in 1966, these included ten ABRES and Nike-Zeus tests and two OV launches. Two flights failed. These were respectively 303D on March 4 and 208D on May 3. The former suffered a sustainer hydraulic failure following BECO and premature engine shutdown, the latter experienced high thrust section temperatures beginning at T+45 seconds, loss of sustainer gimbaling control at T+135 seconds, loss of vernier control at T+195 seconds, and propulsion system shutdown starting at T+233 seconds. Impact occurred east of Hawaii, about 2,300 miles (3,700 km) downrange.

Six Atlas Ds were launched in 1967, five ABRES tests and one OV launch. All were successful and Missile 94D, launched from 576-B2 on November 7, was the final Atlas D flight as ABRES testing would continue using E and F-series missiles.

Most Atlas D launches were sub-orbital missile tests; however several were used for other missions, including orbital launches of crewed Mercury, and uncrewed OV1 spacecraft. Two were also used as sounding rockets as part of Project FIRE. A number were also used with upper stages, such as the RM-81 Agena, to launch satellites.

The Atlas D was deployed in limited numbers as an ICBM due to its radio guidance while the fully operational E and F-series missiles had inertial guidance packages and a different ignition system that allowed faster engine starts.

For Mercury, the Atlas D was used to launch four crewed Mercury spacecraft into low Earth orbit. The modified version of the Atlas D used for Project Mercury was designated Atlas LV-3B.

Atlas Ds used for space launches were custom-built for the needs of the mission they were performing, but when the Atlas was retired from missile service in 1965, Convair introduced a standardized Atlas vehicle (the SLV-3) for all space missions. Remaining D-series missiles were flown until 1967 for suborbital tests of reentry vehicles and a few space launches.

A total of 116 D-series missiles (not including vehicles used for space launches) were flown from 1959 to 1967 with 26 failures.

== Warhead ==
The warhead of the Atlas D was originally the G.E. Mk 2 "heat sink" re-entry vehicle (RV) with a W49 thermonuclear weapon, combined weight 3,700 lb (1,680 kg) and yield of 1.44 megatons (Mt). The W-49 was later placed in a Mk 3 ablative RV, combined weight 2,420 lb (1,100 kg) The Atlas E and F had an AVCO Mk 4 RV containing a W-38 thermonuclear bomb with a yield of 3.75 Mt which was fuzed for either air burst or contact burst. The Mk 4 RV also deployed penetration aids in the form of mylar balloons which replicated the radar signature of the Mk 4 RV. The Mk 4 plus W-38 had a combined weight of 4,050 lb (1,840 kg).

== See also ==
- SM-65 Atlas
- List of Atlas launches (1960–1969)
