= List of Atlas launches (1960–1969) =

== Launch statistics ==
=== Rocket configurations ===
- Atlas-Agena
- Atlas-Able
- Atlas-Centaur
- Atlas SLV
- Atlas D
- Atlas E
- Atlas F

=== Launch sites ===
- Cape Canaveral LC-11
- Cape Canaveral LC-12
- Cape Canaveral LC-13
- Cape Canaveral LC-14
- Cape Canaveral SLC-36A
- Cape Canaveral SLC-36B
- Vandenberg LC-576A
- Vandenberg OSTF-1
- Vandenberg OSTF-2
- Vandenberg SLC-3E
- Vandenberg SLC-3W
- Vandenberg SLC-4E
- Vandenberg SLC-4W

=== Launch outcomes ===
- Success
- Partial failure
- Failure

== 1960 ==
Date/Time (UTC)	Rocket	S/N	Launch site	Payload	Function	Orbit	Outcome	Remarks
1960-01-07; 01:40	Atlas D	43D	CCAFS LC-13		ICBM test	Suborbital	Success	
1960-01-26; 23:43	Atlas D	6D	VAFB 576A3		ICBM test	Suborbital	Success	
1960-01-27; 01:31	Atlas D	44D	CCAFS LC-13		ICBM test	Suborbital	Success	
1960-02-12; 04:11	Atlas D	49D	CCAFS LC-13		ICBM test	Suborbital	Success	
1960-02-26; 17:25	Atlas-Agena A LV-3	29D	CCAFS LC-14	MIDAS 1	Missile warning	LEO (target)	Failure	Agena RSO charges accidentally fired at staging, leading to vehicle breakup. First launch of the Atlas-Agena vehicle.
1960-03-08; 13:10	Atlas D	42D	CCAFS LC-11		ICBM test	Suborbital	Success	
1960-03-11; 00:36	Atlas D	51D	CCAFS LC-13		ICBM test	Suborbital	Failure	Combustion instability in B-1 engine. Missile fell back onto the pad and exploded.
1960-04-08; 13:10	Atlas D	48D	CCAFS LC-11		ICBM test	Suborbital	Failure	Combustion instability in B-2 engine. Missile exploded on the pad.
1960-04-22; 19:39	Atlas D	25D	VAFB 576B2		ICBM test	Suborbital	Success	
1960-05-06; 19:39	Atlas D	23D	VAFB 576B2		ICBM test	Suborbital	Failure	Pitch gyro motor shorted, causing loss of control. RSO T+25 seconds
1960-05-20; 15:00	Atlas D	56D	CCAFS LC-12		ICBM test	Suborbital	Success	
1960-05-24; 17:36	Atlas-Agena A LV-3	45D	CCAFS LC-14	MIDAS 2	Missile warning	LEO	Success	
1960-06-11; 06:30	Atlas D	54D	CCAFS LC-11		ICBM test	Suborbital	Success	
1960-06-22; 14:49	Atlas D	62D	CCAFS LC-14		ICBM test	Suborbital	Success	
1960-06-28; 02:30	Atlas D	27D	CCAFS LC-12		ICBM test	Suborbital	Success	
1960-07-02; 06:58	Atlas D	60D	CCAFS LC-11		ICBM test	Suborbital	Partial failure	Short in relay box caused decrease in propulsion system performance. The missile impacted 40 miles short of its intended target point.
1960-07-22; 23:46	Atlas D	74D	VAFB 576B1		ICBM test	Suborbital	Failure	Gyro spin motor failure resulted in an unplanned pitch maneuver that exceeded the missile's structural limits and caused vehicle breakup at T+69 seconds.
1960-07-29; 13:13	Atlas D	50D	CCAFS LC-14	Mercury-Atlas 1	Mercury test	Suborbital	Failure	Excessive aerodynamic bending of the Mercury adapter interface results in Atlas structural failure T+58 seconds. First attempted launch of a Mercury capsule.
1960-08-09; 18:09	Atlas D	32D	CCAFS LC-12		ICBM test	Suborbital	Success	
1960-08-12; 13:00	Atlas D	66D	CCAFS LC-12		ICBM test	Suborbital	Success	Atlas portion of flight successful, RVX-2A reentry vehicle not recovered
1960-09-12; 20:38	Atlas D	47D	VAFB 576B3		ICBM test	Suborbital	Failure	Sustainer engine lost thrust due to failure of helium control pressure
1960-09-17; 00:50	Atlas D	76D	CCAFS LC-11		ICBM test	Suborbital	Success	
1960-09-19; 18:31	Atlas D	79D	CCAFS LC-14		ICBM test	Suborbital	Success	
1960-09-25; 15:13	Atlas-Able	80D	CCAFS LC-12	Pioneer P-30	Lunar probe	HEO (target)	Failure	Second stage propellant feed malfunction
1960-09-29; 20:31	Atlas D	33D	VAFB 576B2		ICBM test	Suborbital	Failure	Staging electrical disconnect plug pulled out T+125 seconds, causing premature BECO and failure of booster section to jettison. Missile impacted 1200 miles off target.
1960-10-11; 19:15	Atlas E	3E	CCAFS LC-13		ICBM test	Suborbital	Failure	First Atlas E launch. Sustainer hydraulic rise-off disconnect failed due to radiated heat, causing loss of hydraulic fluid and sustainer shutdown T+40 seconds. Missile tumbled following staging and broke up at T+154 seconds.
1960-10-11; 20:33	Atlas-Agena A LV-3	57D	VAFB SLC-3W	Samos 1	Optical reconnaissance	LEO (target)	Failure	Improper pad umbilical disconnect caused loss of Agena pressurization gas.
1960-10-13; 04:53	Atlas D	81D	VAFB 576B3		ICBM test	Suborbital	Failure	LOX tank sensing line rise-off disconnect failed due to radiated heat. Overpressurization of the LOX tank ruptured the intermediate bulkhead followed by missile self-destruction at T+71 seconds.
1960-10-13; 09:34	Atlas D	71D	CCAFS LC-11	Biological nose cone w/ three mice	ICBM test	Suborbital	Success	
1960-10-22; 09:34	Atlas D	55D	CCAFS LC-12		ICBM test	Suborbital	Success	
1960-11-15; 05:54	Atlas D	83D	CCAFS LC-12		ICBM test	Suborbital	Success	
1960-11-30; 01:12	Atlas E	4E	CCAFS LC-13		ICBM test	Suborbital	Failure	Sustainer hydraulic rise-off disconnect failed due to radiated heat, causing loss of hydraulic fluid and sustainer shutdown T+40 seconds. Missile tumbled following staging, but remained structurally intact until impact with the ocean.
1960-12-15; 09:10	Atlas-Able	91D	CCAFS LC-12	Pioneer P-31	Lunar probe	HEO (target)	Failure	Vibration and/or flying debris from Able adapter section ruptured Atlas LOX tank T+66 seconds, followed by complete vehicle self-destruction at T+73 seconds.
1960-12-16; 04:53	Atlas D	99D	VAFB 576B3		ICBM test	Suborbital	Success	

== 1961 ==
Date/Time (UTC)	Rocket	S/N	Launch site	Payload	Function	Orbit	Outcome	Remarks
1961-01-23; 21:02	Atlas D	90D	CCAFS LC-12		ICBM test	Suborbital	Success	Final R&D flight of a D-series Atlas
1961-01-24; 21:55	Atlas E	8E	CCAFS LC-13		ICBM test	Suborbital	Failure	Aerodynamic heating shorted the vernier feedback transducer, resulting in unstable flight trajectory
1961-01-31; 20:21	Atlas-Agena A LV-3	70D	VAFB SLC-3W	Samos 2	Optical reconnaissance	LEO	Success	
1961-02-21; 14:12	Atlas D	67D	CCAFS LC-14	Mercury-Atlas 2	Mercury test	Suborbital	Success	First successful launch of a Mercury-Atlas
1961-02-24; 18:29	Atlas E	9E	CCAFS LC-13		ICBM test	Suborbital	Success	First successful launch of an Atlas-E
1961-03-14; 04:17	Atlas E	13E	CCAFS LC-13		ICBM test	Suborbital	Failure	Propellant utilization malfunction results in premature fuel depletion and sustainer shutdown
1961-03-25; 01:49	Atlas E	16E	CCAFS LC-13		ICBM test	Suborbital	Partial failure	Wiring error results in loss of helium control bottle gas, no gas left to perform booster jettison
1961-04-25; 16:15	Atlas-D	100D	CCAFS LC-14	Mercury-Atlas 3	Uncrewed spacecraft	LEO (target)	Failure	First attempted orbital Mercury launch. Pitch and roll sequence failed to initiate due to short or open circuit in missile programmer. RSO T+43 seconds. Capsule successfully recovered.
1961-05-13; 02:00	Atlas E	12E	CCAFS LC-11		ICBM test	Suborbital	Success	
1961-05-24; 21:50	Atlas D	95D	VAFB 576B2		ICBM test	Suborbital	Success	
1961-05-26; 02:26	Atlas E	18E	CCAFS LC-13		ICBM test	Suborbital	Success	
1961-06-07; 21:13	Atlas E	27E	VAFB OSTF-1		ICBM test	Suborbital	Failure	First attempted launch of an Atlas E from VAFB. Vehicle exploded at liftoff due to combustion instability in the B-1 engine.
1961-06-23; 03:00	Atlas E	17E	CCAFS LC-13		ICBM test	Suborbital	Failure	Gyro spin motor set to incorrect speed, causing excessive pitch rate and missile self-destruction at T+101 seconds.
1961-07-07; 04:51	Atlas E	22E	CCAFS LC-13		ICBM test	Suborbital	Success	
1961-07-12; 15:11	Atlas-Agena A LV-3	97D	VAFB SLC-3E	MIDAS 3	Missile warning	MEO	Success	
1961-07-31; 21:32	Atlas E	21E	CCAFS LC-11		ICBM test	Suborbital	Success	
1961-08-09; 04:31	Atlas F	2F	CCAFS LC-13		ICBM test	Suborbital	Success	Maiden flight of Atlas F
1961-08-23; 04:31	Atlas D	101D	VAFB 576B3		ICBM test	Suborbital	Success	
1961-08-23; 10:04	Atlas-Agena B LV-3	111D	CCAFS LC-12	Ranger 1	Lunar impact probe	HEO (target)	Failure	Agena failed to restart due to electrical short; spacecraft left in LEO.
1961-09-09; 01:42	Atlas E	26E	CCAFS LC-13		ICBM test	Suborbital	Failure	Sustainer engine lost thrust due to gas generator failure following booster staging.
1961-09-09; 19:28	Atlas-Agena B LV-3	106D	VAFB SLC-3W	Samos 3	Optical reconnaissance	LEO (target)	Failure	Improper umbilical eject sequence causes loss of electrical power. Vehicle fell back onto the pad and exploded.
1961-09-13; 14:04	Atlas-D	88D	CCAFS LC-14	Mercury-Atlas 4	Uncrewed spacecraft	LEO	Success	
1961-10-02; 18:23	Atlas E	25E	CCAFS LC-11		ICBM test	Suborbital	Success	
1961-10-05; 13:42	Atlas E	30E	CCAFS LC-13		ICBM test	Suborbital	Success	
1961-10-21; 13:53	Atlas-Agena B LV-3	105D	VAFB SLC-3E	MIDAS 4	Missile warning	MEO	Partial failure	Roll control failed T+186 seconds, satellite placed in an incorrect orbit
1961-11-10; 14:55	Atlas E	32E	CCAFS LC-13	Biological nose cone w/ squirrel monkey	ICBM test	Suborbital	Failure	Sustainer engine shut down at liftoff due to improperly installed pressure transducer. RSO T+35 seconds.
1961-11-18; 08:12	Atlas-Agena B LV-3	117D	CCAFS LC-12	Ranger 2	Lunar impact probe	HEO (target)	Failure	Agena failed to restart due to rate gyro malfunction; spacecraft left in LEO.
1961-11-22; 20:45	Atlas-Agena B LV-3	108D	VAFB SLC-3W	Samos 4	Optical reconnaissance	LEO (target)	Failure	Pitch control failed at T+244 seconds. Agena separated but was left facing in the wrong direction for orbital insertion.
1961-11-22; 21:04	Atlas F	4F	CCAFS LC-11		ICBM test	Suborbital	Success	
1961-11-29; 15:08	Atlas-D	93D	CCAFS LC-14	Mercury-Atlas 5	Uncrewed spacecraft	LEO	Success	
1961-11-29; 23:01	Atlas D	53D	VAFB 576B2		ICBM test	Suborbital	Success	
1961-12-01; 20:40	Atlas E	35E	CCAFS LC-13		ICBM test	Suborbital	Success	
1961-12-07; 21:18	Atlas D	82D	VAFB 576B3		ICBM test	Suborbital	Success	
1961-12-12; 20:16	Atlas F	5F	CCAFS LC-11		ICBM test	Suborbital	Partial failure	Intermittently shorted diode in guidance system results in premature propulsion system cutoff. Planned range not achieved.
1961-12-20; 03:32	Atlas E	36E	CCAFS LC-13		ICBM test	Suborbital	Success	
1961-12-21; 03:35	Atlas F	6F	CCAFS LC-11	Biological nose cone w/ rhesus monkey	ICBM test	Suborbital	Failure	Sustainer hydraulic system leak at staging results in loss of hydraulic fluid and engine shutdown. Nose cone separated properly, but was lost at sea after recovery crews failed to locate it.
1961-12-22; 19:12	Atlas-Agena B LV-3	114D	VAFB SLC-3E	Samos 5	Optical reconnaissance	LEO	Partial failure	Sustainer cutoff timer failed, causing the Atlas to burn to propellant depletion and putting the payload in a higher than planned orbit.

== 1962 ==
Date/Time (UTC)	Rocket	S/N	Launch site	Payload	Function	Orbit	Outcome	Remarks
1962-01-17; 21:02	Atlas D	123D	VAFB 576B2		ICBM test	Suborbital	Success	
1962-01-23; 21:28	Atlas D	132D	VAFB 576B3		ICBM test	Suborbital	Success	
1962-01-26; 20:30	Atlas-Agena B LV-3	121D	CCAFS LC-12	Ranger 3	Lunar impact probe	HEO (target)	Partial failure	Failure of both Atlas and Agena guidance systems; probe sent on incorrect trajectory
1962-02-13; 20:55	Atlas E	40E	CCAFS LC-13		ICBM test	Suborbital	Success	Final Atlas E R&D launch
1962-02-16; 23:04	Atlas D	137D	VAFB 576B2		ICBM test	Suborbital	Success	
1962-02-20; 14:47	Atlas-D	109D	CCAFS LC-14	Mercury-Atlas 6	Crewed spacecraft	LEO	Success	Carried John Glenn into orbit. First American orbital crewed flight.
1962-02-21; 22:30	Atlas D	52D	VAFB 576B3		ICBM test	Suborbital	Failure	Booster gas generator hot gas leak results in engine shutdown and missile self-destruction at T+72 seconds.
1962-03-01; 00:04	Atlas E	66E	VAFB OSTF-1		ICBM test	Suborbital	Failure	Thrust section fire resulted in failure of booster section to jettison and premature vernier shutdown. Missile self-destructed at T+295 seconds.
1962-03-07; 22:10	Atlas-Agena B LV-3	112D	VAFB SLC-3E	Samos 6	Optical reconnaissance	LEO	Success	
1962-03-24; 00:39	Atlas D	134D	VAFB 576B2		ICBM test	Suborbital	Success	Launch witnessed by President Kennedy
1962-04-09; 15:04	Atlas-Agena B LV-3	110D	VAFB SLC-3E	MIDAS 5	Missile warning	MEO	Partial failure	Improper pitch program results in incorrect orbit.
1962-04-09; 20:50	Atlas F	11F	CCAFS LC-11		ICBM test	Suborbital	Failure	Sustainer LOX turbopump failure. Missile exploded one second after liftoff.
1962-04-12; 01:57	Atlas D	129D	VAFB 576B2		ICBM test	Suborbital	Success	
1962-04-23; 20:50	Atlas-Agena B LV-3	133D	CCAFS LC-12	Ranger 4	Lunar impact probe	HEO	Success	
1962-04-26; 18:56	Atlas-Agena B LV-3	118D	VAFB SLC-3W	Samos 7	Optical reconnaissance	LEO	Success	
1962-04-27; 23:24	Atlas D	140D	VAFB 576B2		ICBM test	Suborbital	Success	
1962-05-08; 19:49	Atlas-Centaur-A LV-3C	AC-1	CCAFS LC-36A		Test flight vehicle	Suborbital	Failure	First launch of the Atlas-Centaur vehicle. Centaur insulation panel separated prematurely, resulting in LH2 tank rupture at T+54 seconds and subsequent complete launch vehicle destruction.
1962-05-12; 00:31	Atlas D	127D	VAFB 576B3		ICBM test	Suborbital	Success	
1962-05-24; 12:45	Atlas-D	107D	CCAFS LC-14	Mercury-Atlas 7	Crewed spacecraft	LEO	Success	Carried Scott Carpenter into orbit.
1962-06-17; 18:14	Atlas-Agena B LV-3	115D	VAFB SLC-3W	Samos 8	Optical reconnaissance	LEO	Success	
1962-06-26; 10:57	Atlas D	21D	VAFB 576B3	NTMP K-1	Nike-Zeus target missile test	Suborbital	Success	
1962-07-12; 16:57	Atlas D	141D	VAFB 576B2	NTMP K-2	Nike-Zeus target missile test	Suborbital	Success	
1962-07-13; 21:11	Atlas E	67E	VAFB OSTF-1		ICBM test	Suborbital	Partial failure	Propellant utilization system malfunction due to LOX leak. Improper sustainer engine operation caused the RV to overshoot its target.
1962-07-18; 20:15	Atlas-Agena B LV-3	120D	VAFB SLC-3W	Samos 9	Optical reconnaissance	LEO	Success	
1962-07-19; 11:05	Atlas D	13D	VAFB 576B1		ICBM test	Suborbital	Success	
1962-07-22; 09:21	Atlas-Agena B LV-3	145D	CCAFS LC-12	Mariner 1	Venus flyby probe	IPT (target)	Failure	Improper guidance system programming resulted in erroneous flight path. RSO T+294 seconds.
1962-08-01; 21:07	Atlas F	15F	VAFB 576E		ICBM test	Suborbital	Success	
1962-08-05; 17:59	Atlas-Agena B LV-3	124D	VAFB SLC-3W	Samos 10	Optical reconnaissance	LEO	Success	
1962-08-09; 22:51	Atlas D	8D	VAFB 576-B3		ICBM test	Suborbital	Success	
1962-08-09; 23:05	Atlas D	87D	VAFB 576-B2		ICBM test	Suborbital	Success	
1962-08-10; 21:11	Atlas F	57F	VAFB OSTF-2		ICBM test	Suborbital	Failure	Roll program failed due to open circuit in missile programmer. RSO T+67 seconds.
1962-08-13; 22:00	Atlas F	7F	CCAFS LC-11		ICBM test	Suborbital	Success	
1962-08-27; 06:53	Atlas-Agena B LV-3	179D	CCAFS LC-12	Mariner 2	Venus flyby probe	IPT	Success	First spacecraft to reach the vicinity of another planet.
1962-09-19; 18:15	Atlas F	8F	CCAFS LC-11		ICBM test	Suborbital	Success	
1962-10-02; 11:46	Atlas D	4D	VAFB 576B2	NTMP-K3	Nike-Zeus target missile test	Suborbital	Failure	Vernier failure results in sustainer engine being oversupplied with propellant. Sustainer shut down at T+181 seconds due to damage from excessive chamber pressure.
1962-10-03; 12:15	Atlas-D	113D	CCAFS LC-14	Mercury-Atlas 8	Crewed spacecraft	LEO	Success	Carried Walter M. Schirra, Jr. into orbit.
1962-10-18; 16:59	Atlas-Agena B LV-3	215D	CCAFS LC-12	Ranger 5	Lunar impact probe	HEO	Success	
1962-10-19; 18:15	Atlas F	14F	CCAFS LC-11		ICBM test	Suborbital	Success	
1962-10-26; 10:59	Atlas D	159D	VAFB 576A1	NTMP K-5	Nike-Zeus target missile test	Suborbital	Success	
1962-11-07; 19:43	Atlas F	16F	CCAFS LC-11		ICBM test	Suborbital	Success	
1962-11-11; 20:17	Atlas-Agena B LV-3	128D	VAFB SLC-3W	Samos 11	Optical reconnaissance	LEO	Success	
1962-11-14; 22:36	Atlas F	13F	VAFB OSTF-2		ICBM test	Suborbital	Failure	Thrust section fire caused premature sustainer shutdown
1962-12-05; 21:25	Atlas F	21F	CCAFS LC-11		ICBM test	Suborbital	Success	Final Atlas F R&D launch
1962-12-12; 11:38	Atlas D	161D	VAFB 576A3	NTMP K-6	Nike-Zeus target missile test	Suborbital	Success	
1962-12-17; 20:36	Atlas-Agena B LV-3	131D	VAFB SLC-3E	MIDAS 6	Missile warning	MEO (target)	Failure	Hydraulic rise-off disconnect heat shield failed at liftoff, resulting in loss of booster engine hydraulics fluid. Vehicle self-destructed T+80 seconds.
1962-12-18; 17:26	Atlas E	64E	VAFB OSTF-1	NTMP K-4	Nike-Zeus target missile test	Suborbital	Failure	Pressure pulse at liftoff caused loss of B-2 turbopump lubricant oil. Missile self-destructed T+40 seconds.
1962-12-22; 09:29	Atlas D	160D	VAFB 576A1	NTMP K-7	Nike-Zeus target missile test	Suborbital	Success	

== 1963 ==
Date/Time (UTC)	Rocket	S/N	Launch site	Payload	Function	Orbit	Outcome	Remarks
1963-01-25; 10:44	Atlas D	39D	VAFB 576B2	NTMP K-9	Nike-Zeus target missile test	Suborbital	Failure	Loss of sustainer insulation boot at liftoff results in high thrust section temperatures, followed by complete propulsion system shutdown at T+126 seconds.
1963-01-31; 08:51	Atlas D	176D	VAFB 576A3	NTMP K-12	Nike-Zeus target missile test	Suborbital	Success	
1963-02-13; 11:55	Atlas D	182D	VAFB 576A1	NTMP K-8	Nike-Zeus target missile test	Suborbital	Success	
1963-02-28; 09:02	Atlas D	188D	VAFB 576A3	NTMP K-10	Nike-Zeus target missile test	Suborbital	Success	
1963-03-01; 22:00	Atlas F	134F	CCAFS LC-11	ABRES REX-1	Reentry vehicle test	Suborbital	Success	
1963-03-10; 02:42	Atlas D	102D	VAFB 576B3		ICBM test	Suborbital	Failure	Pitch gyro failure results in loss of control. Missile self-destructed T+33 seconds.
1963-03-12; 05:21	Atlas D	64D	VAFB 576B2		ICBM test	Suborbital	Success	
1963-03-15; 11:38	Atlas D	46D	VAFB 576B1		ICBM test	Suborbital	Failure	Hydraulic rise-off disconnect heat shield failed at liftoff, resulting in loss of sustainer hydraulics fluid followed by missile tumbling and self-destruction.
1963-03-16; 02:05	Atlas F	63F	VAFB 576D		ICBM test	Suborbital	Success	
1963-03-16; 08:32	Atlas D	193D	VAFB 576A1	NTMP K-14	Nike-Zeus target missile test	Suborbital	Failure	High thrust section temperatures cause sustainer hydraulics failure followed by missile tumbling and self-destruction at T+240 seconds.
1963-03-21; 21:10	Atlas F	83F	VAFB OSTF-2		ICBM test	Suborbital	Success	
1963-03-24; 00:09	Atlas F	52F	VAFB 576E		ICBM test	Suborbital	Failure	Missile self-destructed at T+91 seconds. Insufficient telemetry to determine the cause of the failure.
1963-04-24; 20:59	Atlas E	65E	VAFB OSTF-1		ICBM test	Suborbital	Success	
1963-04-27; 02:03	Atlas F	135F	CCAFS LC-11	ABRES REX-2	Reentry vehicle test	Suborbital	Success	
1963-05-09; 20:06	Atlas-Agena B LV-3	119D	VAFB SLC-3E	MIDAS 7	Missile warning	MEO	Success	
1963-05-15; 13:04	Atlas-D	130D	CCAFS LC-14	Mercury-Atlas 9	Crewed spacecraft	LEO	Success	Carried Gordon Cooper into orbit.
1963-06-04; 20:12	Atlas E	62E	VAFB OSTF-1		ICBM test	Suborbital	Success	
1963-06-12; 09:03	Atlas D	198D	VAFB 576A3	NTMP	Nike-Zeus target missile test	Suborbital	Success	
1963-06-12	Atlas-Agena B LV-3	139D	VAFB SLC-3E	MIDAS 8	Missile warning	MEO (target)	Failure	Hydraulic rise-off disconnect heat shield failed at liftoff, resulting in loss of booster engine hydraulic fluid. Vehicle self-destructed T+93 seconds.
1963-07-03; 21:13	Atlas E	69E	VAFB 576C		ICBM test	Suborbital	Success	
1963-07-12; 20:46	Atlas-Agena D LV-3	201D	VAFB SLC-4W	KH-7 Gambit 4001	Optical reconnaissance	LEO	Success	
1963-07-19; 03:51	Atlas-Agena B LV-3	75D	VAFB SLC-3E	MIDAS 9	Missile warning	MEO	Success	
1963-07-26; 19:19	Atlas E	24E	VAFB OSTF-1		ICBM test	Suborbital	Failure	Electrical short in Range Safety system results in spurious cutoff signal being issued to the sustainer engine at T+143 seconds
1963-07-30; 18:36	Atlas E	70E	VAFB 576C		ICBM test	Suborbital	Success	
1963-07-31; 20:52	Atlas D	143D	VAFB 576B2		ICBM test	Suborbital	Success	
1963-08-24; 09:50	Atlas E	72E	VAFB 576F	NTMP	Nike-Zeus target missile test	Suborbital	Success	
1963-08-28; 23:10	Atlas D	142D	VAFB 576B3		ICBM test	Suborbital	Success	
1963-09-06; 19:30	Atlas-Agena D LV-3	212D	VAFB SLC-4W	KH-7 Gambit 4002	Optical reconnaissance	LEO	Success	
1963-09-06; 21:59	Atlas D	63D	VAFB 576B2		ICBM test	Suborbital	Failure	Vernier hydraulic line ruptured T+110 seconds, causing loss of sustainer hydraulics fluid followed by sustainer/vernier shutdown.
1963-09-11; 21:00	Atlas D	84D	VAFB 576B1		ICBM test	Suborbital	Failure	High thrust section temperatures result in loss of vernier hydraulic pressure, missile tumbled during vernier solo phase
1963-09-25; 11:04	Atlas E	71E	VAFB 576C		ICBM test	Suborbital	Failure	Sustainer hydraulic line ruptured at staging. Missile stability lost T+140 seconds.
1963-10-04; 05:17	Atlas F	45F	VAFB 576G		ICBM test	Suborbital	Failure	Stuck valve resulted in B-2 engine failing to start. Missile fell over and exploded on impact with the ground.
1963-10-07; 21:31	Atlas D	163D	VAFB 576B3		ICBM test	Suborbital	Failure	Improper preflight procedure results in loss of tank pressure and intermediate bulkhead reversal. Missile self-destructed T+75 seconds.
1963-10-17; 02:37	Atlas-Agena D LV-3	197D	CCAFS LC-13	Vela 1A/1B	Nuclear strike detection	HEO	Success	
1963-10-25; 18:59	Atlas-Agena D LV-3	224D	VAFB SLC-4W	KH-7 Gambit 4003	Optical reconnaissance	LEO	Success	
1963-10-28; 21:00	Atlas F	136F	CCAFS LC-11	ABRES WAC-1/SSP 21/FLIP	Reentry vehicle test	Suborbital	Failure	Sustainer hydraulic line ruptured at staging. Control lost T+140 seconds.
1963-11-04; 09:34	Atlas D	232D	VAFB 576A1	ABRES REX-3	Reentry vehicle test	Suborbital	Success	
1963-11-13; 22:35	Atlas D	158D	VAFB 576B2		ICBM test	Suborbital	Failure	Final Atlas D operational test. Sustainer hydraulics failure results in engine shutdown and missile destruction at T+120 seconds
1963-11-27; 19:03	Atlas-Centaur-B LV-3C	AC-2	CCAFS LC-36A		Test flight vehicle	LEO	Success	Performed first liquid hydrogen rocket engine firing in space.
1963-12-18; 09:34	Atlas D	233D	VAFB 576A1	ABRES LORV-8	Reentry vehicle test	Suborbital	Success	
1963-12-18; 21:45	Atlas-Agena D LV-3	227D	VAFB SLC-4W	KH-7 Gambit 4004	Optical reconnaissance	LEO	Success	
1963-12-18; 22:56	Atlas F	109F	VAFB 576G		ICBM test	Suborbital	Success	Final Atlas R&D flight

== 1964 ==
Date/Time (UTC)	Rocket	S/N	Launch site	Payload	Function	Orbit	Outcome	Remarks
1964-01-30; 15:49	Atlas-Agena B LV-3	199D	CCAFS LC-12	Ranger 6	Lunar impact probe	HEO	Success	
1964-02-12; 19:59	Atlas E	48E	VAFB OSTF-1		ICBM test	Suborbital	Failure	Guidance system timer malfunctioned due to liftoff-induced vibration. Propulsion system cutoff commands issued prematurely, planned range not achieved.
1964-02-25; 18:59	Atlas-Agena D LV-3	285D	VAFB SLC-4W	KH-7 Gambit 4005	Optical reconnaissance	LEO	Success	
1964-02-25; 20:22	Atlas E	5E	CCAFS LC-11	ABRES WAC-3/Pod 18	Reentry vehicle test	Suborbital	Success	
1964-03-11; 20:14	Atlas-Agena D LV-3	296D	VAFB SLC-4W	KH-7 Gambit 4006	Optical reconnaissance	LEO	Success	
1964-04-01; 20:22	Atlas F	137F	CCAFS LC-11	ABRES WAC-2	Reentry vehicle test	Suborbital	Success	
1964-04-03; 20:26	Atlas F	3F	VAFB OSTF-2		ICBM test	Suborbital	Failure	Stuck valve resulted in B-1 engine failing to start. Missile fell over and exploded on impact with the ground.
1964-04-14; 21:42	Atlas D	263D	CCAFS LC-12	FIRE 1	Apollo heat shield test	Suborbital	Success	
1964-04-23; 16:19	Atlas-Agena D LV-3	351D	VAFB SLC-4W	KH-7 Gambit 4007	Optical reconnaissance	LEO	Success	
1964-05-19; 19:21	Atlas-Agena D LV-3	350D	VAFB SLC-4W	KH-7 Gambit 4008	Optical reconnaissance	LEO	Success	
1964-06-18; 14:56	Atlas D	243D	VAFB 576-A1	ABRES LORV-1	Reentry vehicle test	Suborbital	Success	
1964-06-30; 14:04	Atlas-Centaur-C LV-3C	AC-3	CCAFS LC-36A		Test flight vehicle	LEO (target)	Failure	Centaur hydraulics pump failed, causing engine shutdown 253 seconds after Centaur ignition.
1964-07-06; 18:51	Atlas-Agena D LV-3	352D	VAFB SLC-4W	KH-7 Gambit 4009	Optical reconnaissance	LEO	Success	
1964-07-17; 02:37	Atlas-Agena D LV-3	216D	CCAFS LC-13	Vela 2A/2B	Nuclear strike detection	HEO	Success	
1964-07-28; 16:50	Atlas-Agena B LV-3	250D	CCAFS LC-12	Ranger 7	Lunar impact probe	HEO	Success	
1964-07-29; 09:22	Atlas D	248D	VAFB 576-A3	NTMP KX-13	Nike-Zeus target missile test	Suborbital	Success	
1964-08-07; 20:12	Atlas F	110F	VAFB 576-E		ICBM test	Suborbital	Success	
1964-08-14; 22:00	Atlas-Agena D SLV-3	7101	VAFB SLC-4E	KH-7 Gambit 4010	Optical reconnaissance	LEO	Success	
1964-08-27; 09:54	Atlas E	57E	VAFB OSTF-1	ST/KX-48	Nike-Zeus target vehicle test	Suborbital	Partial failure	Guidance system malfunction caused premature sustainer/vernier cutoff, planned range not achieved
1964-08-31; 15:46	Atlas F	36F	VAFB 576-D		ICBM test	Suborbital	Success	
1963-09-05; 01:23	Atlas-Agena B LV-3	195D	CCAFS LC-12	OGO 1	Magnetosphere research	HEO	Success	
1964-09-15; 15:27	Atlas D	245D	VAFB 576-A1	ABRES LORV-3	Reentry vehicle test	Suborbital	Partial failure	Guidance rate beacon failure results in RSO accidentally issuing a manual cutoff command following SECO. No vernier solo phase.
1964-09-22; 15:27	Atlas D	247D	VAFB 576-A3	NTMP KX-19	Nike-Zeus target missile test	Suborbital	Success	
1964-09-23; 13:10	Atlas-Agena D SLV-3	7102	VAFB SLC-4E	KH-7 Gambit 4011	Optical reconnaissance	LEO	Success	
1964-10-08	Atlas-Agena D SLV-3	7103	VAFB SLC-4E	KH-7 Gambit 4012	Optical reconnaissance	LEO (target)	Failure	Agena shut down 1.5 seconds after ignition due to an electrical short
1964-10-23; 18:30	Atlas-Agena D LV-3	353D	VAFB SLC-4W	KH-7 Gambit 4013	Optical reconnaissance	LEO	Success	
1964-11-05; 19:22	Atlas-Agena D LV-3	289D	CCAFS LC-13	Mariner 3	Mars flyby probe	IPT	Failure	Payload fairing failed to separate.
1964-11-28; 14:22	Atlas-Agena D LV-3	288D	CCAFS LC-12	Mariner 4	Mars flyby probe	IPT	Success	First spacecraft to reach the vicinity of Mars.
1964-12-01; 08:45	Atlas D	210D	VAFB 576-A1	ABRES LORV-5	Reentry vehicle test	Suborbital	Success	
1964-12-04; 11:09	Atlas D	300D	VAFB 576-A3	NTMP RMV-303	Nike-Zeus target missile test	Suborbital	Success	
1964-12-04; 18:57	Atlas-Agena D SLV-3	7105	VAFB SLC-4E	KH-7 Gambit 4014	Optical reconnaissance	LEO	Success	
1964-12-11; 14:25	Atlas-Centaur-C LV-3C	AC-4	CCAFS LC-36A	Surveyor mass model	Test flight vehicle	MEO (target); LEO (actual)	Partial failure	Centaur ullage rocket design flaw prevented it from restarting.
1964-12-22; 19:15	Atlas F	111F	VAFB 576-E		ICBM test	Suborbital	Success	

== 1965 ==
Date/Time (UTC)	Rocket	S/N	Launch site	Payload	Function	Orbit	Outcome	Remarks
1965-01-08; 18:59	Atlas F	106F	VAFB 576-G		ICBM test	Suborbital	Success	Final Atlas ICBM test
1965-01-12; 18:59	Atlas D	166D	VAFB 576-B1	NTMP RMV-302	Nike/Zeus target missile test	Suborbital	Success	
1965-01-21; 20:09	Atlas D-OV1	172D	VAFB LC-576B-3	OV1-1	Technology test	LEO (target)	Failure	PU valve set wrong, high fuel consumption led to premature sustainer cutoff; satellite deployment failed.
1965-01-23; 20:09	Atlas-Agena D SLV-3	7106	VAFB SLC-4W	KH-7 Gambit 4015	Optical reconnaissance	LEO	Success	
1965-02-17; 17:05	Atlas-Agena B LV-3	196D	CCAFS LC-12	Ranger 8	Lunar impact probe	HEO	Success	
1965-02-27; 11:11	Atlas D	211D	VAFB 576-A1	ABRES LORV-4	Reentry vehicle test	Suborbital	Success	
1965-03-02; 09:52	Atlas D	301D	VAFB 576-A3	NTMP RMV-301	Nike/Zeus target missile test	Suborbital	Success	
1965-03-02; 13:25	Atlas-Centaur-C LV-3C	AC-5	CCAFS LC-36A	Surveyor SD-1	Test flight vehicle	MEO (target)	Failure	Booster fuel prevalves accidentally closed at T+2 seconds, causing loss of booster engine thrust. Vehicle fell back onto the pad and exploded.
1965-03-12; 19:25	Atlas-Agena D SLV-3	7104	VAFB SLC-4W	KH-7 Gambit 4016	Optical reconnaissance	LEO	Success	
1965-03-12; 23:21	Atlas D	154D	VAFB 576-A3	ABRES MTV-2	Reentry vehicle test	Suborbital	Success	
1965-03-21; 21:37	Atlas-Agena B LV-3	204D	CCAFS LC-12	Ranger 9	Lunar impact probe	HEO	Success	
1965-03-26; 09:01	Atlas D	297D	VAFB 576-A1	ABRES LORV-7	Reentry vehicle test	Suborbital	Success	
1965-04-03; 21:25	Atlas-Agena D SLV-3	7401	VAFB SLC-4E	SNAPSHOT	Technology testing	LEO	Success	First and only nuclear reactor powered American satellite.
1965-04-06; 13:34	Atlas D	150D	VAFB 576-B1	ABRES WAC-4	Reentry vehicle test	Suborbital	Success	
1965-04-28; 20:17	Atlas-Agena D SLV-3	7107	VAFB SLC-4E	KH-7 Gambit 4017	Optical reconnaissance	LEO	Success	
1965-05-22; 13:34	Atlas D	264D	CCAFS LC-12	FIRE 2	Apollo heat shield test	Suborbital	Success	
1965-05-27; 19:30	Atlas-Agena D SLV-3	7108	VAFB SLC-4E	KH-7 Gambit 4018	Optical reconnaissance	LEO	Success	
1965-05-28; 02:54	Atlas D-OV1	68D	VAFB LC-576B-3	OV1-3	Technology test	LEO (target)	Failure	LOX leak caused loss of booster engine thrust and thrust section explosion T+128 seconds. Vehicle self-destructed T+210 seconds.
1965-06-03; 10:38	Atlas D	177D	VAFB 576-B2	NTMP RMV-304	Nike/Zeus target missile test	Suborbital	Success	
1965-06-08; 16:17	Atlas D	299D	VAFB 576-A1	ABRES LORV-6	Reentry vehicle test	Suborbital	Success	
1965-06-10; 12:26	Atlas D	302D	VAFB 576-A3	NTMP RMV-303	Nike/Zeus target missile test	Suborbital	Success	
1965-06-25; 19:30	Atlas-Agena D SLV-3	7109	VAFB SLC-4E	KH-7 Gambit 4019	Optical reconnaissance	LEO	Success	
1965-07-01; 09:54	Atlas D	59D	VAFB 576-B1	NTMP KX-32	Nike/Zeus target missile test	Suborbital	Success	
1965-07-12; 19:00	Atlas-Agena D SLV-3	7112	VAFB SLC-4E	KH-7 Gambit 4020	Optical reconnaissance	LEO (target)	Failure	Programmer accidentally commanded sustainer shutdown at BECO.
1965-07-20; 08:27	Atlas-Agena D LV-3	225D	CCAFS LC-13	Vela 3A/3B	Nuclear strike detection	HEO	Success	One vernier engine failed to start, slightly low orbit did not preclude successful completion of the mission.
1965-08-03; 19:12	Atlas-Agena D SLV-3	7111	VAFB SLC-4E	KH-7 Gambit 4021	Optical reconnaissance	LEO	Success	
1965-08-04; 12:43	Atlas D	183D	VAFB 576-B1	ABRES WAC-5	Reentry vehicle test	Suborbital	Success	
1965-08-05; 12:41	Atlas F	147F	VAFB 576-A2	ABRES LORV-2A	Reentry vehicle test	Suborbital	Success	
1965-08-11; 14:31	Atlas-Centaur-D LV-3C	AC-6	CCAFS LC-36B	Surveyor SD-2	Test flight vehicle	HEO	Success	
1965-08-26; 11:20	Atlas D	61D	VAFB 576-B2	NTMP KX-41	Nike/Zeus target missile test	Suborbital	Success	
1965-09-29; 10:40	Atlas D	125D	VAFB 576-B1	NTMP KX-45	Nike/Zeus target missile test	Suborbital	Success	
1965-09-30; 19:20	Atlas-Agena D SLV-3	7110	VAFB SLC-4E	KH-7 Gambit 4022	Optical reconnaissance	LEO	Success	
1965-10-05; 09:07	Atlas D-OV1	34D	VAFB LC-576B-3	OV1-2	Technology test	LEO	Success	
1965-10-25; 15:00	Atlas-Agena D SLV-3	5301	CCAFS LC-14	GATV 5002	Docking target vehicle	LEO (target)	Failure	Agena engine exploded at ignition. Was to be used as the docking target for Gemini 6.
1965-11-08; 19:26	Atlas-Agena D SLV-3	7113	VAFB SLC-4E	KH-7 Gambit 4023	Optical reconnaissance	LEO	Success	
1965-11-29; 11:20	Atlas D	200D	VAFB 576-A1	NTMP KX-33/SSP-27	Nike/Zeus target missile test	Suborbital	Success	
1965-12-20; 13:39	Atlas D	85D	VAFB 576-B2	NTMP KX-31	Nike/Zeus target missile test	Suborbital	Success	

== 1966 ==
Date/Time (UTC)	Rocket	S/N	Launch site	Payload	Function	Orbit	Outcome	Remarks
1966-01-19; 20:10	Atlas-Agena D SLV-3	7114	VAFB SLC-4E	KH-7 Gambit 4024	Optical reconnaissance	LEO	Success	
1966-02-10; 15:34	Atlas D	305D	VAFB 576-A1	NTMP KX-38	Nike-Zeus target missile test	Suborbital	Success	
1966-02-10; 13:04	Atlas D	86D	VAFB 576-B2	NTMP KX-51	Nike-Zeus target missile test	Suborbital	Success	
1966-02-15; 13:04	Atlas-Agena D SLV-3	7115	VAFB SLC-4E	KH-7 Gambit 4025	Optical reconnaissance	LEO	Success	
1966-02-19; 09:56	Atlas D	73D	VAFB 576-B1	NTMP KX-47	Nike-Zeus target missile test	Suborbital	Success	
1966-03-03; 12:29	Atlas D	303D	VAFB 576-A1	NTMP KX-35	Nike-Zeus target missile test	Suborbital	Failure	Sustainer hydraulic system lost pressure at booster jettison, followed by missile tumbling and propulsion system shutdown
1966-03-16; 15:00	Atlas-Agena D SLV-3	5302	CCAFS LC-14	GATV 5003	Docking target vehicle	LEO	Success	Used as the docking target for Gemini 8.
1966-03-18; 20:30	Atlas-Agena D SLV-3	7116	VAFB SLC-4E	KH-7 Gambit 4026	Optical reconnaissance	LEO	Success	
1966-03-19; 09:56	Atlas D	304D	VAFB 576-A1	NTMP KX-43	Nike-Zeus target missile test	Suborbital	Partial failure	Sustainer fuel valve failed to close at SECO. Residual thrust caused target missile to overshoot the target point.
1966-03-30; 09:20	Atlas D-OV1	72D	VAFB LC-576B-3	OV1-4/OV1-5	Technology test	LEO	Success	
1966-04-08; 01:00	Atlas-Centaur-D LV-3C	AC-8	CCAFS LC-36B	Surveyor SD-3	Test flight vehicle	HEO (target) / LEO (actual)	Partial failure	Centaur stage ran out of ullage propellant before restarting.
1966-04-08; 19:35	Atlas-Agena D SLV-3	5001	CCAFS LC-12	OAO-1	High energy astronomy research	LEO	Success	Spacecraft failed shortly after launch.
1966-04-19; 19:12	Atlas-Agena D SLV-3	7117	VAFB SLC-4E	KH-7 Gambit 4027	Optical reconnaissance	LEO	Success	
1966-05-03; 10:30	Atlas D	208D	VAFB 576-A1	NTMP KX-37	Nike-Zeus target missile test	Suborbital	Failure	Sustainer shut down prematurely due to high thrust section temperatures.
1966-05-13; 11:43	Atlas D	98D	VAFB 576-B1	ABRES WAC-5A	Reentry vehicle test	Suborbital	Success	
1966-05-14; 18:30	Atlas-Agena D SLV-3	7118	VAFB SLC-4E	KH-7 Gambit 4028	Optical reconnaissance	LEO	Success	
1966-05-17; 15:15	Atlas-Agena D SLV-3	5303	CCAFS LC-14	GATV 5004	Docking target vehicle	LEO (target)	Failure	Programmer servo-amplifier failure due to either cryo leakage or pinched wiring results in unplanned pitch-over just before BECO. Vehicle fell into the Atlantic Ocean. Was to be used as the docking target for Gemini 9.
1966-05-26; 12:04	Atlas D	41D	VAFB 576-B2	NTMP KX-47	Nike-Zeus target missile test	Suborbital	Success	
1966-05-30; 14:41	Atlas-Centaur-D LV-3C	AC-10	CCAFS LC-36A	Surveyor 1	Lunar lander	HEO	Success	First American lander to soft-land on the Moon.
1966-06-01; 15:00	Atlas SLV-3	5304	CCAFS LC-14	ATDA	Docking target vehicle	LEO	Success	Used as the docking target for Gemini 9, but docking not attempted as the booster shroud failed to separate from the ATDA.
1966-06-03; 19:25	Atlas-Agena D SLV-3	7119	VAFB SLC-4E	KH-7 Gambit 4029	Optical reconnaissance	LEO	Success	
1966-06-07; 02:48	Atlas-Agena B SLV-3	5601	CCAFS LC-12	OGO-3	Magnetosphere research	HEO	Success	
1966-06-09; 20:15	Atlas-Agena D SLV-3	7201	VAFB SLC-3E	MIDAS 10	Missile warning	MEO	Partial failure	Agena restart burn failed
1966-06-10; 11:15	Atlas D	96D	VAFB 576-B1	NTMP KX-42	Nike-Zeus target missile test	Suborbital	Success	
1966-06-26; 15:34	Atlas D	147D	VAFB 576-B2	NTMP KX-20	Nike-Zeus target missile test	Suborbital	Success	
1966-06-30; 10:00	Atlas D	298D	VAFB 576-A1	NTMP KX-39	Nike-Zeus target missile test	Suborbital	Success	
1966-07-12; 17:57	Atlas-Agena D SLV-3	7120	VAFB SLC-4E	KH-7 Gambit 4030	Optical reconnaissance	LEO	Success	
1966-07-14; 02:10	Atlas D-OV1	58D	VAFB LC-576B-3	OV1-7/OV1-8	Technology test	LEO	Partial failure	Satellite kick motor failed
1966-07-18; 20:39	Atlas-Agena D SLV-3	5305	CCAFS LC-14	GATV 5005	Docking target vehicle	LEO	Success	Used as the docking target for Gemini 10.
1966-08-08; 17:47	Atlas F	149F	VAFB 576-A2	ABRES MBRV-1	Reentry vehicle test	Suborbital	Failure	Fuel line obstruction causes early sustainer shutdown and no R/V separation
1966-08-10; 19:26	Atlas-Agena D SLV-3	5801	CCAFS LC-13	Lunar Orbiter 1	Lunar orbiter	HEO	Success	
1966-08-16; 18:30	Atlas-Agena D SLV-3	7121	VAFB SLC-4E	KH-7 Gambit 4031	Optical reconnaissance	LEO	Success	
1966-08-19; 19:30	Atlas-Agena D SLV-3	7202	VAFB SLC-3E	MIDAS 11	Missile warning	MEO	Success	
1966-09-12; 13:05	Atlas-Agena D SLV-3	5306	CCAFS LC-14	GATV 5006	Docking target vehicle	LEO	Success	Used as the docking target for Gemini 11.
1966-09-16; 17:59	Atlas-Agena D SLV-3	7123	VAFB SLC-4E	KH-7 Gambit 4032	Optical reconnaissance	LEO	Success	
1966-09-20; 12:32	Atlas-Centaur-D LV-3C	AC-7	CCAFS LC-36A	Surveyor 2	Lunar lander	HEO	Success	Spacecraft failed en route to the Moon.
1966-10-05; 22:00	Atlas-Agena D SLV-3	7203	VAFB SLC-3E	MIDAS 12	Missile warning	MEO	Success	
1966-10-11; 19:59	Atlas F	115F	VAFB OSTF 576-A2	ABRES SBGRV-1	Reentry vehicle test	Suborbital	Failure	Fuel prevalve failure resulted in B-1 engine shutdown. Missile self-destructed T+88 seconds.
1966-10-12; 19:15	Atlas-Agena D SLV-3	7122	VAFB SLC-4E	KH-7 Gambit 4033	Optical reconnaissance	LEO	Success	
1966-10-26; 11:12	Atlas-Centaur-D LV-3C	AC-9	CCAFS LC-36B	Surveyor SD-4	Test flight vehicle	HEO	Success	Performed first ever liquid hydrogen rocket engine restart in space.
1966-11-02; 20:23	Atlas-Agena D SLV-3	7124	VAFB SLC-4E	KH-7 Gambit 4034	Optical reconnaissance	LEO	Success	
1966-11-06; 23:21	Atlas-Agena D SLV-3	5802	CCAFS LC-13	Lunar Orbiter 2	Lunar orbiter	HEO	Success	
1966-11-11; 19:08	Atlas-Agena D SLV-3	5307	CCAFS LC-14	GATV 5001	Docking target vehicle	LEO	Success	Used as the docking target for Gemini 12.
1966-12-05; 21:09	Atlas-Agena D SLV-3	7125	VAFB SLC-4E	KH-7 Gambit 4035	Optical reconnaissance	LEO	Success	
1966-12-07; 02:12	Atlas-Agena D SLV-3	5101	CCAFS LC-12	ATS-1	Communication/Meteorology	GEO	Success	
1966-12-11; 21:10	Atlas D-OV1	89D	VAFB 576-B3	OV1-9/OV1-10	Technology test	LEO	Success	
1966-12-21; 22:15	Atlas SLV-3	7001	VAFB SLC-3E	PRIME	Technology test	Suborbital	Success	

== 1967 ==
Date/Time (UTC)	Rocket	S/N	Launch site	Payload	Function	Orbit	Outcome	Remarks
1967-01-18; 01:34	Atlas F	148F	VAFB 576 A2	ABRES TVX-13	Reentry vehicle test	Suborbital	Success	
1967-01-22; 15:44	Atlas D	35D	VAFB 576 B2	ABRES MK-12R	Reentry vehicle test	Suborbital	Success	
1967-02-02; 20:00	Atlas-Agena D SLV-3	7126	VAFB SLC-4E	KH-7 Gambit 4036	Optical reconnaissance	LEO	Success	
1967-02-05; 01:17	Atlas-Agena D SLV-3	5803	CCAFS LC-13	Lunar Orbiter 3	Lunar orbiter	Lunar	Success	
1967-02-13; 22:00	Atlas F	121F	VAFB 576 A3	ABRES TX-22	Reentry vehicle test	Suborbital	Success	
1967-03-05; 23:05	Atlas SLV-3	7002	VAFB SLC-3E	PRIME	Technology test	Suborbital	Success	
1967-03-16; 17:56	Atlas F	151F	VAFB 576 A2	ABRES MBRV-2	Reentry vehicle test	Suborbital	Success	
1967-04-06; 03:23	Atlas-Agena D SLV-3	5102	CCAFS LC-12	ATS-2	Communication/Meteorology	GEO (planned)	Partial failure	Agena stage failed to re-ignite
1967-04-07; 11:19	Atlas D	38D	VAFB 576 B2	ABRES AX-1	Reentry vehicle test	Suborbital	Success	
1967-04-17; 07:05	Atlas-Centaur-D LV-3C	AC-12	CCAFS LC-36B	Surveyor 3	Lunar lander	TLI	Success	
1967-04-20; 01:35	Atlas SLV-3	7003	VAFB SLC-3E	PRIME	Technology test	Suborbital	Success	
1967-05-04; 22:25	Atlas-Agena D SLV-3	5804	CCAFS LC-13	Lunar Orbiter 4	Lunar orbiter	Lunar	Success	
1967-05-19; 22:00	Atlas F	119F	VAFB 576 A1	ABRES SBGRV-2	Reentry vehicle test	Suborbital	Partial failure	Static discharge ignited the Atlas's RSO charges at reentry vehicle separation.
1967-05-22; 18:30	Atlas-Agena D SLV-3	7127	VAFB SLC-4E	KH-7 Gambit 4037	Optical reconnaissance	LEO	Success	
1967-06-04; 18:07	Atlas-Agena D SLV-3	7128	VAFB SLC-4E	KH-7 Gambit 4038	Optical reconnaissance	LEO	Success	
1967-06-09; 10:23	Atlas-F/Trident	122F	VAFB 576 A3	ABRES RMP-B-1	Rentry vehicle test	Suborbital	Success	
1967-06-14; 06:01	Atlas-Agena D SLV-3	5401	CCAFS LC-12	Mariner 5	Venus flyby probe	IPT	Success	
1967-07-06; 11:19	Atlas D	65D	VAFB 576 B2	ABRES PDV	Reentry vehicle test	Suborbital	Success	
1967-07-14; 11:53	Atlas-Centaur-D LV-3C	AC-11	CCAFS LC-36A	Surveyor 4	Lunar lander	TLI	Success	Spacecraft crash landed on the Moon.
1967-07-22 unknown	Atlas-F/Trident	114F	VAFB 576 A3	ABRES RMP-B-2	Rentry vehicle test	Suborbital	Success	
1967-07-27; 19:00	Atlas D-OV1	92D	VAFB LC-576B-3	OV1-11/OV1-12/OV1-86	Technology test	LEO	Partial failure	OV1-11 kick motor failed
1967-07-29; 08:48	Atlas F	150F	VAFB 576 A1	ABRES MBRV-3	Reentry vehicle test	Suborbital	Success	
1967-08-01; 22:33	Atlas-Agena D SLV-3	5805	CCAFS LC-13	Lunar Orbiter 5	Lunar orbiter	Lunar	Success	
1967-09-08; 07:57	Atlas-Centaur-D SLV-3C	AC-13	CCAFS LC-36B	Surveyor 5	Lunar lander	TLI	Success	
1967-10-11; 11:30	Atlas D	69D	VAFB 576 B3	ABRES MBRV-3	Reentry vehicle test	Suborbital	Success	
1967-10-14; 22:00	Atlas F	118F	VAFB 576 A2	ABRES MBRV-4	Reentry vehicle test	Suborbital	Success	
1967-10-27 unknown	Atlas-F/Trident	81F	VAFB 576 A3	ABRES RMP-B-3	Rentry vehicle test	Suborbital	Failure	Ruptured ducting in booster hydraulic system results in loss of control. Vehicle self-destructed T+37 seconds.
1967-11-05; 23:37	Atlas-Agena D SLV-3	5103	CCAFS LC-12	ATS-3	Communication/Meteorology	GEO	Success	
1967-11-07; 07:39	Atlas-Centaur-D SLV-3C	AC-14	CCAFS LC-36B	Surveyor 6	Lunar lander	TLI	Success	
1967-11-07; 13:17	Atlas D	94D	VAFB 576 B2	ABRES Mk-11 AX-2	Reentry vehicle test	Suborbital	Success	
1967-11-10; 12:20	Atlas F	113F	VAFB 576 A1	ABRES BGRV-1	Reentry vehicle test	Suborbital	Success	
1967-12-21 unknown	Atlas-F/Trident	117F	VAFB 576 A3	ABRES RMP-B-4	Reentry vehicle test	Suborbital	Success	

== 1968 ==
Date/Time (UTC)	Rocket	S/N	Launch site	Payload	Function	Orbit	Outcome	Remarks
1968-01-07; 06:30	Atlas-Centaur-D SLV-3C	AC-15	CCAFS LC-36A	Surveyor 7	Lunar lander	HEO	Success	
1968-01-31; 05:29	Atlas-F/Trident	94F	VAFB 576 A3	ABRES RMP-B-5	BMRS BRV for Target 21 (Rentry vehicle test)	Suborbital	Success	
1968-02-26; 12:20	Atlas F	116F	VAFB 576 A1	ABRES BGRV-2	Reentry vehicle test	Suborbital	Success	
1968-03-04; 13:06	Atlas-Agena D SLV-3A	5602A	CCAFS LC-13	OGO-5	Magnetosphere research	HEO	Success	
1968-03-06; 22:00	Atlas E	74E	VAFB 576-A3	ABRES RMP-B7	Reentry vehicle test	Suborbital	Success	
1968-04-06; 09:59	Atlas F-OV1	107F	VAFB LC-576A-2	OV1-13/OV1-14	Technology test	LEO	Success	
1968-04-18; 22:00	Atlas E	77E	VAFB 576-A1	ABRES RVTO-1A-1	Reentry vehicle test	Suborbital	Success	
1968-04-27; 22:00	Atlas E/Trident	78E	VAFB 576-A3	ABRES RBM-B8	Reentry vehicle test	Suborbital	Success	
1968-05-03; 12:20	Atlas F	95F	VAFB 576 A2	ABRES Penaid TVX	Reentry vehicle test	Suborbital	Failure	Short in missile programmer results in no pitch program. RSO T+45 seconds.
1968-06-01; 12:20	Atlas F	89F	VAFB 576 A2	ABRES PDV	Reentry vehicle test	Suborbital	Success	
1968-06-29; 00:01	Atlas F	32F	VAFB 576 A1	ABRES RVTO-1A-2	Reentry vehicle test	Suborbital	Success	
1968-07-11; 19:30	Atlas F-OV1	75F	VAFB LC-576A-2	OV1-15/OV1-16	Technology test	LEO	Success	
1968-08-06; 11:08	Atlas-Agena D SLV-3A	5501A	CCAFS LC-13	Canyon 1 (AFP-827)	ELINT	HEO	Success	
1968-08-10; 22:33	Atlas-Centaur-D SLV-3C	AC-17	CCAFS LC-36A	ATS-4	Communication/Meteorology	GEO (target)	Partial failure	Centaur stage failed to restart due to oxidizer leak.
1968-08-16; 20:57	Atlas-SLV3 Burner-2	7004	VAFB SLC-3E	STP P68-1	Technology test	LEO (target)	Failure	Payload fairing failed to separate.
1968-09-25; 00:00	Atlas F/Trident	99F	VAFB 576 A3	RMP-B 9	Reentry vehicle test	Suborbital	Success	
1968-09-27; 00:00	Atlas F	84F	VAFB 576 A1	ABRES RVTO-1A-3	Reentry vehicle test	Suborbital	Success	
1968-11-16	Atlas F/Trident	56F	VAFB 576 A3	RMP-B-10	Reentry vehicle test	Suborbital	Failure	Vernier solo accumulator malfunction during vernier solo phase
1968-11-24; 00:01	Atlas F	60F	VAFB 576 A1	ABRES RVTO-1A-4	Reentry vehicle test	Suborbital	Success	
1968-12-07; 08:40	Atlas-Centaur-D SLV-3C	AC-16	CCAFS LC-36B	OAO-2	High energy astronomy research	LEO	Success	

== 1969 ==
Date/Time (UTC)	Rocket	S/N	Launch site	Payload	Function	Orbit	Outcome	Remarks
1969-01-16; 00:00	Atlas F/Trident	70F	VAFB 576 A3	RMP-B 11	Reentry vehicle test	Suborbital	Success	
1969-02-25; 01:29	Atlas-Centaur-D SLV-3C	AC-20	CCAFS LC-36B	Mariner 6	Mars flyby probe	IPT	Success	
1969-03-18; 07:47	Atlas F-OV1	104F	VAFB LC-576A-2	OV1-17/OV1-18/OV1-19	Technology test	LEO	Success	
1969-03-27; 22:22	Atlas-Centaur-D SLV-3C	AC-19	CCAFS LC-36A	Mariner 7	Mars flyby probe	IPT	Success	
1969-04-13; 02:30	Atlas-Agena D SLV-3A	5502A	CCAFS LC-13	Canyon 2 (AFP-827)	ELINT	HEO	Success	
1969-08-12; 11:01	Atlas-Centaur-D SLV-3C	AC-18	CCAFS LC-36A	ATS-5	Communication/Meteorology	GEO	Success	
1969-08-20; 00:00	Atlas F	112F	VAFB 576 A1	ABRES RVTO-1A-5	Reentry vehicle test	Suborbital	Success	
1969-09-16; 00:00	Atlas F/Trident	100F	VAFB 576 A3	RMP-B 12	Reentry vehicle test	Suborbital	Success	
1969-10-10; 00:00	Atlas F/Trident	98F	VAFB 576 A3	RMP-B-13	Reentry vehicle test	Suborbital	Failure	Loss of sustainer turbopump lubricant and failure of hydraulic rise-off disconnect resulted in sustainer shutdown T+65 seconds. Missile tumbled following BECO.
1969-12-03; 00:00	Atlas F	44F	VAFB 576 A1	ABRES RVTO-1A-6	Reentry vehicle test	Suborbital	Success	
1969-12-12; 00:00	Atlas F/Trident	93F	VAFB 576 A3	RMP-B 14	Reentry vehicle test	Suborbital	Success	

== Main Page ==
- List of Atlas launches
