= SM-65E Atlas =

Variant of the U.S. Atlas missile

Atlas-E (SM-65E)
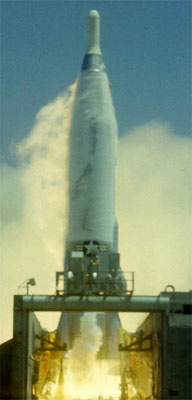
- Launch of an Atlas-E missile
- Function: ICBM; Expendable launch system
- Manufacturer: Convair
- Country of origin: United States

Launch history
- Status: Retired
- Launch sites: LC-11 & 13 CCAFS; OSTF-1, LC-576 & SLC-3, VAFB
- Total launches: 48
- Success(es): 33
- Failure: 15
- First flight: October 11, 1960
- Last flight: March 24, 1995

Boosters
- No. boosters: 1
- Powered by: 2 LR-89-5
- Total thrust: 369,802 lbf (1,644.96 kN)
- Specific impulse: 256 s
- Burn time: 120 s
- Propellant: RP-1/LOX

First stage
- Powered by: 1 LR-105-5
- Maximum thrust: 86,844 lbf (386.30 kN)
- Specific impulse: 316 s
- Burn time: 309 s
- Propellant: RP-1/LOX

The SM-65E Atlas, or Atlas-E, was an operational variant of the Atlas missile. It first flew on October 11, 1960, and was deployed as an operational ICBM from September 1961 until April 1966. Following retirement as an ICBM, the Atlas-E, along with the Atlas-F, was refurbished for orbital launches as the Atlas E/F. The last Atlas E/F launch was conducted on March 24, 1995, using a rocket which had originally been built as an Atlas E.

As fully operational ICBMs, the Atlas E and F, which differed only in guidance systems, had upgraded engines and inertial control instead of the Atlas D's radio ground guidance. The ignition system was also different from the one used on the D-series, which used a "wet" start, meaning that the propellants were injected into the combustion chamber prior to ignition, and a hypergolic igniter on the fully developed version. The Atlas E/F for comparison used pyrotechnic cartridges and a dry start (ignition coming before propellant injection) for an extremely rapid ignition that required no hold-down time on the pad to prevent combustion instability. The booster engines had separate gas generators unlike the Atlas D which had one gas generator for both engines. The launcher system used for the E and F series was also different from the D series, eliminating the hold-down arms in favor of a mechanism that would immediately release the missile as thrust built up.

Atlas-E launches were conducted from Cape Canaveral Air Force Station, at Launch Complexes 11 and 13, and Vandenberg Air Force Base at OSTF-1, LC-576 and SLC-3.

== 1960–61 ==
The Atlas E testing program commenced on October 11, 1960, when Missile 3E was launched from Cape Canaveral's LC-13. At around 40 seconds into launch, the sustainer hydraulic system lost pressure. After booster jettison, the missile lost attitude control, tumbled, and broke up at T+154 seconds. On November 30, the second attempt, Missile 4E, repeated the same failure except that the missile remained structurally intact until impact in the ocean. Both of these failures were traced to radiated heat that caused a failure of the sustainer hydraulic rise-off disconnect, which ruptured and allowed the hydraulic fluid to escape; they resulted in shielding being added to protect the rise-off disconnect.

Missile 8E on January 24, 1961, lost roll control due to aerodynamic heating shorting the vernier pitch control servo, a problem that had not occurred since the early Atlas A tests. Missile 9E on February 4 experienced problems with the propellant utilization system and prematurely depleted its fuel supply, however the warhead landed only a few miles short of the target, so the flight was considered a success. Missile 13E (March 14) experienced a similar problem, but with a much earlier sustainer cutoff and the warhead missed its target by almost 2,000 miles (3,200 km). Missile 16E (March 25) depleted its supply of helium control gas early, making it impossible to jettison the booster section. The missile was dragged down by the weight of the spent booster engines and fell short of its intended range, also the propellant utilization system malfunctioned again and caused the engines to run fuel rich. The failure was traced to two mistakenly transposed wires which caused spurious venting of the control helium out the vernier engines.

Missile 12E (May 13) and Missile 18E (May 26) both performed well. Testing now began at VAFB on the West Coast, but the first attempt ended ignominiously when Missile 27E lifted from OSTF-1 (Operational Silo Test Facility) on June 7. The B-1 engine almost immediately shut down at liftoff due to rough combustion, causing a fire in the thrust section that led to the explosion of the missile only four seconds after launch. The failure, a near-repeat of two Atlas D accidents the previous year, extensively damaged OSTF-1 and put it out of use for months. Postflight examination of the missile hardware found extensive damage to the B-1 engine injector head. Afterwards, copper baffles were installed in all injector heads and the engine start sequence changed to wet start (an inert fluid kept in the engine tubes to reduce shock at ignition). The downside of this was adding 40 pounds (18 kg) of additional weight as well as slightly reduced engine performance. The ARMA guidance system on 27E also experienced erratic behavior due to an intermittently shorted diode; the guidance system had flagged a "No-Go" signal during an abortive launch attempt of 27E two days earlier and a rerouting wire was installed around a switch. Had the flight continued, it's possible that the missile would not have achieved a proper trajectory.

The next Atlas E test, from Cape Canaveral, was also a spectacular failure. Missile 17E on June 23 experienced a malfunction of the pitch gyro motor, which was apparently running at 84% speed. The missile began to oscillate in the pitch plane starting at T+15 seconds. At T+79 seconds the LOX tank pressure increased from aerodynamic heating or propellant slosh and at T+97 seconds aerodynamic loads from the excessive pitch rate caused collapse of the vernier fairing, rupturing a low pressure hydraulic line and causing loss of hydraulic pressure to the sustainer and verniers. The missile broke up three seconds later from either aerodynamic heating or structural loads. After this debacle, all remaining Atlas E/F R&D flights had the SMRD (Spin Motor Rotation Detector) system installed.

Atlas E tests at VAFB were curtailed until OSTF-1 could be repaired, and for the remainder of 1961 all testing took place from the Cape. Following two successive flights ending in explosions and an incinerated launch stand, the successful flights of Missiles 22E and 21E during July, followed by the first Atlas F flight in August, came as a relief. On September 9, Missile 26E lost sustainer thrust following BECO and tumbled, falling into the Atlantic Ocean almost 2,000 miles (3,200 km) short of its target. Two E-series flights in October, 25E and 30E, were both successful.

On November 10, an attempt to launch a biological mission (Missile 32E) with a squirrel monkey named Goliath ended in disaster as the Atlas's sustainer engine shut down almost immediately at liftoff, while the verniers failed to start at all. The booster engines managed to retain attitude control until a fire broke out in the thrust section and caused the B-1 engine to shut down at T+22 seconds. Telemetry data became erratic at this point. The Atlas began tumbling uncontrollably and was destroyed by Range Safety at T+35 seconds, the B-2 engine continuing to operate until missile destruction. The nose cone impacted in the ocean about 20 seconds later. Goliath, who was in a padded container with no restraints, was recovered from the Atlantic Ocean three days later. A postmortem examination of the monkey found that he had died of multiple head injuries probably caused by impact with the ocean rather than separation of the capsule from the booster. Had the flight succeeded, Goliath would have been sent on a 5,000 miles (8,000 km) suborbital lob and recovered in the South Atlantic. The capsule had no instrumentation or medical monitoring of the monkey, only a TV camera to record his actions during the flight. The sustainer engine was pulled from the ocean floor and examined, which found that a pressure transducer had accidentally been installed on the test port of the LOX regulator due to an erroneous schematic diagram of the sustainer hardware. This resulted in near-total LOX starvation of the sustainer engine. Strong vibration in the gas generator from the shutdown ruptured low-pressure ducting and started a propellant leak that led to a thrust section fire. The vernier engines never activated due to their startup timer being set to activate following sustainer start (which failed, thus preventing the start signal from being sent to the verniers). Despite these mishaps, the Atlas E was declared operational that month.

The failure of Atlas 32E caused momentary concern over Project Mercury, but NASA reassured the public that the flight used a different model of booster and that the accident had no relevance to Mercury.

The sustainer malfunction on Missile 26E had been traced to a gas generator failure which occurred during the staging sequence, but the exact reason for it was unclear, in part because of the normal momentary telemetry blackout that occurred at booster jettison due to ionized engine exhaust gases impinging on the telemetry antenna. When telemetry returned, the sustainer gas generator temperature was over 1,000 °F (538 °C), suggesting a LOX-rich shutdown.

Ed Hujsak, assistant chief engineer of mechanical and propulsion systems for the Atlas program, believed that the location of the propellant lines on the E/F missiles was causing LOX and RP-1 ejected from the spent booster engines following staging to mix and explode, possibly damaging valves or plumbing. As evidence of this, he pointed to telemetry data from flights indicating a momentary pitching motion of the missile after booster jettison, which could be the result of the energy generated by exploding propellant. The conclusion was that such an event had ruptured low pressure ducting on Missile 26E and caused loss of fuel flow to the sustainer gas generator, or else propellant residue had obstructed the ducting. Hujsak proposed that additional cutoff valves be added to the propellant lines in the booster engines that would be closed just before jettison. This upgrade had to be retrofitted to missiles that had already been shipped, but Air Force officials argued that they only needed to add valves to the LOX lines on the grounds that the RP-1 could not detonate without oxidizer.

On December 6, Missile 6F suffered a leak in the sustainer hydraulic system at BECO, resulting in eventual loss of hydraulic pressure and failure to achieve the planned range. After this debacle, the Air Force relented and agreed to install cutoff valves for the RP-1 lines as well, and this failure mode did not repeat itself.

== 1962 ==
The final Atlas E test from CCAS was Missile 40E on February 13, 1962. With OSTF-1 back in operation, Missile 66E launched on March 1. Shortly after liftoff, a thrust section fire started in the vicinity of the fuel fill/drain valve. It continued until approximately T+50 seconds and then disappeared, but apparently resulted in damage to the thrust section, as the helium control gas leaked and resulted in vernier engine shutdown as well as no booster jettison. After BECO, the sustainer engine was left dragging the dead weight of the booster section. This combined with the loss of roll control from vernier shutdown caused the missile to tumble and finally break up at T+295 seconds. The exact reason for the thrust section fire was not determined. In addition, an erroneous signal from a pad umbilical threw open the LOX boil-off valve at liftoff, causing a gradual decay in tank pressure during ascent, although this was a secondary failure that did not contribute to the eventual loss of the missile.

The Atlas test program during 1962 mainly consisted of Atlas D and F flights. Just two more Atlas E tests were carried out during the year. On July 13, Missile 67E lifted from OSTF-1. A LOX leak, which apparently started at liftoff, resulted in abnormally cold thrust section temperatures and freezing of the helium control lines to the sustainer propellant utilization system. This threw the main propellant valves to the sustainer full open at T+60 seconds and resulted in abnormally high thrust and premature sustainer cutoff. The open propellant valves resulted in an additional 43 seconds of residual thrust following SECO and the R/V missed its target by about 20 miles. Several modifications to the LOX feed system and the sustainer propellant valves were made afterwards.

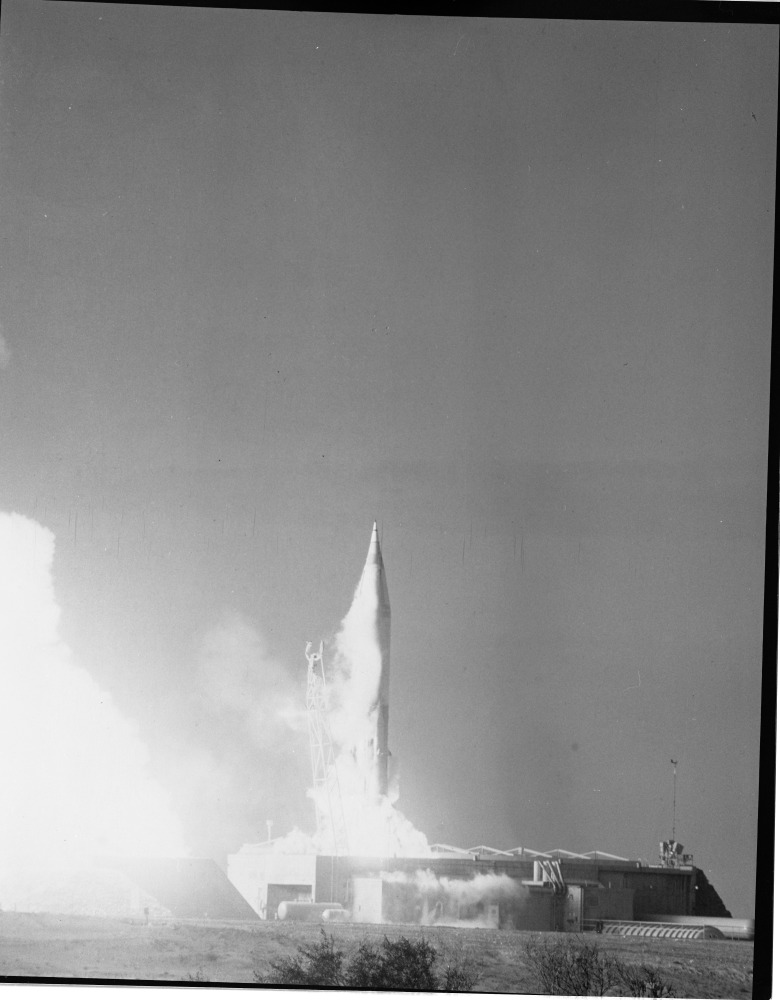
Atlas 64E launch from OSTF-1 in December 1962

One other E-series flew during the year, when Missile 64E lifted from OSTF-1 on December 18. The launch was nominal until T+37 seconds when the B-2 fuel turbopump abruptly stopped, causing immediate fuel starvation to the engine and loss of thrust. The missile yawed to the left and broke up from aerodynamic loads. The sustainer, verniers, and B-1 engine were unaffected by the B-2 shutdown and operated for two seconds afterward. Final loss of telemetry occurred at T+40 seconds.

The immediate cause of the mishap was unclear as there had been no indication of trouble right up until 37 seconds. Following shutdown, the B-2 gas generator's temperature increased by 300°F, suggesting fuel starvation. Temperature probes in the thrust section showed no abnormal temperature increase there.

The failure was ultimately traced to a pressure pulse at liftoff that caused the B-2 insulation boot to be jammed upward and snag on the drain valve for the turbopump lubricant oil tank. During ascent, the oil escaped until the pump ran out of lubricant and seized up, causing engine shutdown and loss of the missile. Improvements to the insulation boots and changes in preflight procedures to prevent pressure pulses from forming were implemented.

Following the Cuban Missile Crisis in October 1962, several Congressmen voiced their concern about the reliability of the ICBM arsenal and whether it would actually work if called upon. Secretary of Defense Robert McNamara thus decided to carry out a test launch of an Atlas missile to verify its operability. The serial numbers of all currently deployed Atlas missiles were written down on pieces of paper, placed inside a hat, and one would be pulled at random. The winner turned out to be Missile 65E, then located at Walker Air Force Base in Kansas. This would be the first launch of an active duty ICBM from an operational silo facility, the Mk IV nuclear warhead would be replaced with a dummy unit and the guidance program changed to fire the Atlas into the Pacific Ocean instead of over the North Pole into the Soviet Union. However, the project quickly met with opposition from Kansas governor John Anderson as well as politicians from neighboring states who protested the idea of a missile flying over populated areas, especially since on-duty ICBMs lacked any Range Safety destruct system in the event of a malfunction. Even if the Atlas flew perfectly, the booster section would still have a high chance of landing in a populated area. Secretary McNamara eventually agreed to transport Atlas 65E to Vandenberg and have the Walker AFB crew launch it there.

Even with this change to a safer launching locale, Congress still argued over the geopolitical implications of such a test. A failure would damage US prestige, a success would send a needless provocation to the Soviet Union especially coming on the heels of the Cuban Missile Crisis. Atlas 65E was eventually launched on April 25, 1963, from OSTF-1 at Vandenberg, as a R&D flight carried out by a Convair team rather than the Walker missileers. The flight, which had a series of modifications designed to correct problems encountered on previous Atlas launches, was completely successful and the missile flew 6,000 miles (9,700 km) downrange, missing the target point by only a few hundred meters. It was also the first completely successful launch from OSTF-1 after five failed attempts.

== 1963 ==
Seven Atlas E flights took place during 1963. The first three, including 65E, were entirely successful. Atlas 24E, launched from OSTF-1 on July 26, experienced an accidental sustainer shutdown at T+143 seconds due to electrical shorts in the Range Safety system which sent a spurious manual cutoff command. The cause of them was unclear, and GD/A could not offer any solution except improved prelaunch checkout procedures. Atlas 70E launched from 576-C on July 30 and was successful, as was 72E, launched on August 24 from OSTF-1. Atlas 71E, the last flight of the year, launched from 576-C on September 25 and experienced a sustainer hydraulic line rupture at staging, leading to missile tumbling and failure of the mission.

== 1964–68 ==
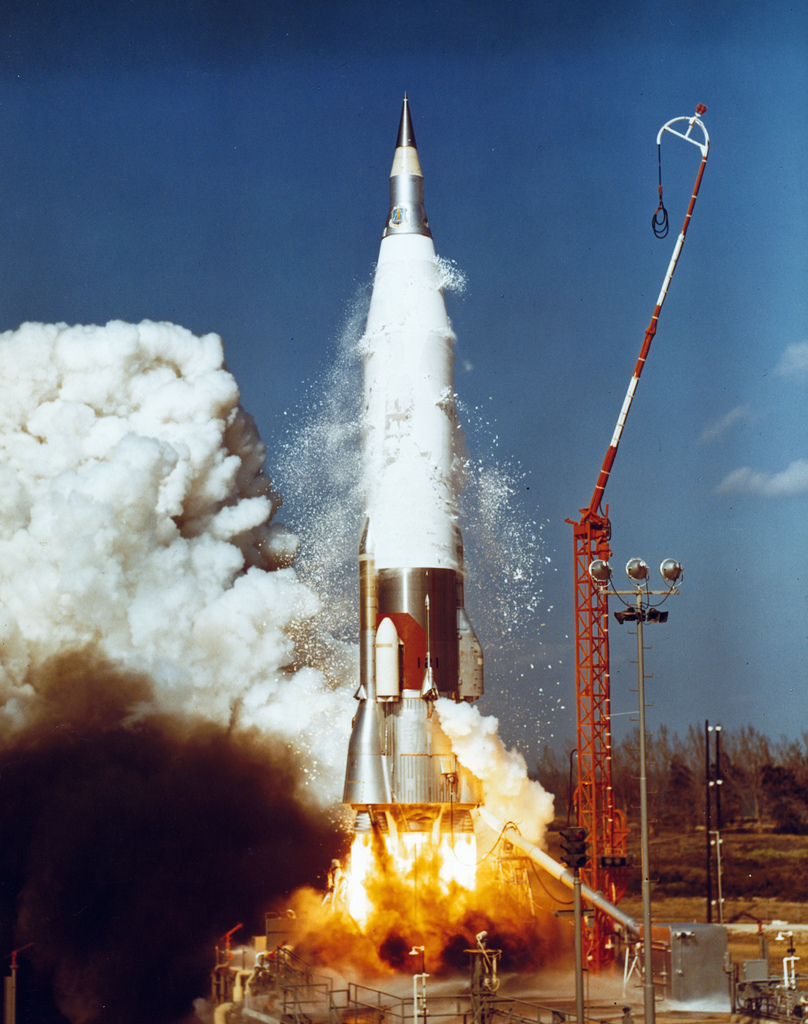
Atlas 5E launching the ABRES WAC-3/Pod 18 re-entry vehicle test from Cape Canaveral LC-11.

Three Atlas Es were launched in 1964. The first of these was 48E on February 12, launched from 576-F. At approximately T+3 seconds, the guidance system issued inadvertent BECO and SECO/VECO cutoff discreets. Since however the programmer was set up to block cutoff commands during the first two minutes of flight in order to prevent a missile fallback on or around the pad area, nothing happened. The BECO command was unblocked at T+120 seconds and the SECO/VECO command at T+200 seconds, causing the missile to impact only 685 miles (1,102 km) downrange. This was the first outright malfunction of the guidance computer on an E-series Atlas and the eventual solution to this problem involved equipping the guidance system with acoustic padding and anti-shock mounts to protect it from liftoff-induced vibration. Missile 5E on February 25 was successful. Missile 57E on August 27 fell 70 miles (110 km) short of its planned range when a malfunction of the guidance system accelerometer caused the sustainer and vernier cutoff signals to be issued four seconds early.

The Atlas E and F were phased out of use as operational ICBMs in 1965 and replaced by the hypergolically-fueled Titan II. Decommissioned Atlas missiles were then used for military satellite launches from Vandenberg AFB well into the 1990s, sometimes with solid-fueled upper stages, sometimes not. These Atlases should be not be confused with the Atlas H which flew five times during the 1980s and was a standard Atlas SLV-3 (descendant of the original Atlas D) flown with solid upper stages.

During 1962–74, the Air Force conducted many dozens of test flights of reentry vehicles and Nike/Zeus target missiles. Most of these were on Atlas D or F missiles, however six of them used Atlas Es. After 1964, only three Atlas Es were flown during the remainder of the 1960s, all of them successful ABRES tests in 1968. No Atlas Es were launched between 1969 and 1979.

== 1980–95 ==
On December 9, 1980, Missile 68E was used to launch a NOSS ELINT satellite from VABF's SLC-3W. Shortly before staging, the B-1 engine shut down, causing the booster to perform a 180-degree loop and plummet back towards Earth. The Range Safety destruct command was sent, resulting in a high-altitude explosion. The failure was attributed to corrosion in a piece of ducting that resulted in loss of lubricant to the B-1 turbopump. The ducting in the Atlas could have been easily replaced, but the Air Force elected not to do so on the grounds that the Space Shuttle would be replacing expendable launch vehicles soon. In addition, the converted Atlas missiles still had various ICBM hardware features which were unnecessary for space launches and added more complexity and failure points. These included attachment ducts so that the lubricant oil tank could be mounted either horizontally or vertically during preparation for a silo launch. As a result of the postflight investigation for Atlas 68E, it was decided to inspect all existing launch vehicles for corroded plumbing and also remove unneeded ICBM hardware.

The last-ever failure of an Atlas caused by the booster itself, as opposed to the upper stages or other external factors, was an attempted launch of the military GPS satellite Navstar 7 on December 19, 1981, using Missile 76E. The B-2 engine shut down seconds after liftoff, causing the Atlas to pitch over and nosedive into the ground. The Range Safety officer sent the destruct command moments before impact, leaving a burnt crater only a few hundred feet from Launch Complex SLC3E. Investigation of the booster debris quickly pinpointed the cause of the problem; a botched repair job on a metal O-ring that caused sealant to plug up ventilation holes in the gas generator, which overpressurized and ruptured shortly after ignition. Escaping flames then burned through a LOX feed line, cutting off the flow of oxidizer to the gas generator and causing B-2 engine shutdown.

On September 17, 1986, Atlas 52E successfully launched NOAA-G, a weather satellite for the National Oceanic and Atmospheric Administration. The launch had been intended for the summer of 1985, but was delayed by more than a year due to endless technical problems and the need to use the Atlas pads at VAFB for DoD launches. After a frustrating series of problems with the Atlas's LOX tank and the booster turbopumps, liftoff took place at 7:52 AM PST. The launch went perfectly and inserted the weather satellite into a 507 by 493 miles (816 km × 793 km) orbit; it was considered a "huge relief" after a year of multiple disasters for the US space program, and it orbited a badly needed satellite after the loss of GOES-G four months earlier.

The final Atlas E launch (Missile 45E launched on March 24, 1995) successfully carried a weather satellite aloft for the Air Force. A total of 64 Atlas Es were launched between 1960 and 1995, thirty of them being space launches. Sixteen launches failed.

== See also ==
- SM-65 Atlas
