= SM-65F Atlas =

Missile

Atlas-F (SM-65F)
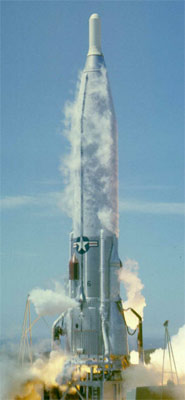
- Launch of an Atlas-F missile
- Function: ICBM; Expendable launch system
- Manufacturer: Convair
- Country of origin: United States

Launch history
- Status: Retired
- Launch sites: LC-11 & 13 CCAFS; OSTF-2, LC-576 & SLC-3, VAFB
- Total launches: 70
- Success(es): 53
- Failure: 17
- First flight: 8 August 1961
- Last flight: 23 June 1981

Boosters
- No. boosters: 1
- Powered by: 2 LR-89-5
- Total thrust: 369,802 lbf (1,644.96 kN)
- Specific impulse: 256 s
- Burn time: 120 s
- Propellant: RP-1/LOX

First stage
- Powered by: 1 LR-105-5
- Maximum thrust: 86,844 lbf (386.30 kN)
- Specific impulse: 316 s
- Burn time: 309 s
- Propellant: RP-1/LOX

The SM-65F Atlas, or Atlas-F, was the final operational variant of the Atlas missile, only differing from the Atlas E in the launch facility and guidance package used. It first flew on 8 August 1961, and was deployed as an operational ICBM between 1961 and 1966. Following retirement as an ICBM, the Atlas-F, along with the Atlas-E, was refurbished for orbital launches as the Atlas E/F.

The Atlas E and F also differed in their launch facilities; Atlas E utilized the same coffin silos as Atlas D missiles, with the missile stored horizontally and raised upright for launch. Atlas F for comparison used a vertical silo with an elevator similar to the Titan I. The Atlas F was originally conceived when the Air Force decided that the coffin silos used for the Atlas D and E were too exposed and vulnerable to enemy attack.

Atlas E and F used the MA-3 propulsion system which had a separate gas generator for all three engines, unlike the Atlas D where one gas generator drove both booster turbopumps. In addition, they used pyrotechnic cartridges for rapid starting and the gas generators and pumps were mounted on each booster engine instead of being placed in the central thrust section. This setup was designed for ease of service and engine swapping in the field, while the Atlas D's simpler configuration was considered preferable for space launches. Total thrust of the MA-3 was 375,000 pounds-force (1,670 kN).

Atlas E/F used the ARMA inertial guidance system rather than Atlas D's radio ground guidance; some IOC (Initial Operational Capability) Atlas D flights tested the ARMA system instead of the standard GE Mod II radio guidance. Aside from minor differences in the ARMA on the Atlas E and F, the major difference between the two consisted of differently-placed quick fill lines for the two silo systems used.

Most refurbished Atlas F space launches used solid-fueled upper stages, a notable exception being Missile 23F which launched Seasat, a NASA oceanography satellite, on June 27, 1978, the last Atlas-Agena vehicle flown. The final Atlas F launch took place on June 23, 1981 when Missile 87F successfully placed a NOAA weather satellite into orbit. Atlas E/F space launchers were given an extensive tear-down and rebuild by Convair and the ARMA system replaced with the GE Mod II guidance system.

== 1961-62 ==
The first two Atlas F flights were Missile 2F on August 8, 1961 and Missile 4F on November 22, both from LC-11 at CCAS. Both tests were entirely successful, and on December 12, Missile 5F launched from LC-11. This test was a partial failure; an electrical short in the guidance system caused an early SECO command to be sent and the missile fell short of its planned range. On the 21st, Atlas 6F lifted off of LC-11 carrying a rhesus monkey named Scatback. This was the third launch of a primate on an Atlas in the past month - the first was Mercury-Atlas 5 which successfully lofted a chimpanzee on a two-orbit mission while the second, an Atlas E test, malfunctioned shortly after liftoff and had to be destroyed, claiming the life of the squirrel monkey it was carrying. Atlas 6F performed acceptably until after booster jettison when a hydraulic failure caused loss of sustainer thrust. The capsule separated and splashed down near Ascension Island in the South Atlantic, however the tracking beacon failed to operate and recovery crews could not locate it. They gave up the search and Scatback was officially lost at sea. The failure was traced to combustion of spent propellant following booster jettison which was damaging valves and/or ducting; it was solved by the installation of cutoff valves in the booster section.

So far, the Atlas F test program had gone well and nobody was prepared for the upcoming disaster on April 9, 1962 when Missile 11F exploded only one second after liftoff from LC-11. Examination of recovered missile parts found that some sort of explosion or detonation in the sustainer turbopump had occurred. The sustainer engine had shut down almost immediately at liftoff followed by loss of its telemetered engine parameter data. The booster engines operated satisfactorily until missile destruction at T+3 seconds.

On May 13, Missile 1F erupted in flames and exploded on the test stand at Sycamore Canyon at the start of a planned 40 second test run. Investigation found that the sustainer LOX turbopump had experienced a detonation much like that of 11F. The LOX feed system was ruptured, leading to an intense LOX-fed fire. An automatic shutdown command was sent to the propulsion system, but damage to wiring resulted in no B-2 shutdown and that engine ran at 100% thrust until the final explosion. The investigation team concluded that a slight delay opening the HS valve in the sustainer engine had occurred; the turbopump was spinning at its maximum speed of 10,000 RPM which resulted in excessive stress on it. The pump shaft vibrated and caused the blades to rub against the casing, causing a friction spark and explosion. The eventual solution to this problem involved adding a plastic liner to the inside of the turbopump.

Testing now began at Vandenberg and Missile 15F flew successfully from 576-E on August 1. Nine days later, Missile 57F launched from OSTF-2 and failed to perform its roll maneuver. The pitch sequence was executed properly, but the lack of the roll program prevented the missile from attaining the correct trajectory and it was blown up by Range Safety 67 seconds into the launch. The cause was believed to be an open circuit to the gyroscopes, although the specific failure point was not determined. The roll signal was sent properly by the guidance system but the flight control system did not respond to it, as a consequence the missile's flight path was about 55° to the right of the planned trajectory. The next test launch took place from the now-repaired LC-11 at the Cape two days later and all subsequent R&D flights went without a hitch except for 13F on November 14 which experienced a thrust section fire beginning at T+18 seconds. Temperatures in the thrust section shot to over 400° and caused a rupture to the pneumatic system. LOX tank and control bottle pressure decayed, followed by loss of pressure to the lube oil reservoir. The sustainer and verniers shut down at T+94 seconds due to lack of turbopump lubricant. The booster engines continued operating until T+120 seconds when a premature BECO signal terminated thrust. Impact occurred 360 miles (579 km) downrange. The cause of the thrust section fire was unknown, however a fuel leak was suspected. The next launch, Missile 21F on December 5, successfully concluded the R&D phase of the Atlas F program.

== 1963-64 ==
Atlas F tests achieved a high degree of success during 1963, and eight flights took place through the year. A series of SAC launches took place from VAFB in March with the missiles stripped to minimal instrumentation. Three of these were Atlas Ds and two F-series. Atlas 63F was launched successfully on March 16 from 576-D. This was followed by the also-successful 83F, not part of the SAC flight series, on March 22. The flight of 52F on March 24 ended in an abrupt explosion 90 seconds after launch and the minimal instrumentation onboard was insufficient to provide any explanation. Tracking camera film showed that the missile was on the proper flight path and no other obvious indications of trouble were visible.

Missile 135F then performed a successful ABRES test from Cape Canaveral's LC-11 on April 27. Six months followed before the next F-series flight when on October 4, Missile 45F suffered a stuck engine valve during an operational test from VABF's 576-G, preventing B-2 engine start. The missile tipped over and exploded on impact with the ground. An ABRES test from LC-11 at Cape Canaveral on October 28 using Missile 136F failed when the sustainer engine lost hydraulic pressure at staging and tumbled. The last F-series flight of the year was on December 18 when 576-G hosted the successful flight of 109F, the last Atlas R&D launch.

Five Atlas Fs were flown in 1964. Missile 137F flew from LC-11 at the Cape on April 1 and performed a successful flight. Two days later, Missile 3F flew from 576-G at VAFB and repeated the same failure as 45F. The B-1 engine experienced a stuck main fuel valve and did not start, once again the missile fell over and exploded on impact with the ground. Damage to the silo facility was more extensive than had been the case with 45F, and 576-G was not used again for six months. Investigation of the two failures found that hardened hypergol residue had been responsible for the stuck valves on both Atlas vehicles, which had accumulated from repeated test firings, and that on 3F, the fuel valve did eventually open, but too late for engine start to be possible. GD/A issued a service bulletin to all Atlas silo crews to make sure missiles were properly checked and free of hypergol residue. Three more F-series flights during the year (110F, 36D, and 111F) were all successful.

== 1965- ==
On January 8, 1965, the final Atlas ICBM test, Missile 106F, successfully launched from 576-G. That year, the Atlas was retired from service as an ICBM and remaining missiles used for suborbital and orbital launches over the next few decades. This included tests of ABRES, RMP, and BMRS reentry vehicles at Vandenberg. The OSTF silos were converted into dedicated launch pads for these and Nike/Zeus target missile testing (the latter were never launched with Atlas Fs). Sixty-five such tests took place between 1965 and 1974, roughly half of which used Atlas Fs. Some had a Trident solid upper stage and there were several failures, the most notable being a 1967 test where the Atlas's RSO charges were ignited by static electricity at RV separation, after which cork insulation was added to the RV to prevent a recurrence of this failure mode.

OV-13 and OV-14 on their Atlas launching vehicle, 1968.

There were two major failures during its 20 years as a satellite launcher. One was an attempted launch of the Radiometer 20 military test payload on April 12, 1975 on Atlas 71F. A glob of gelled LOX and kerosene fell into the flame pit at ignition, exploded, and damaged the Atlas's sustainer engine. The launch vehicle continued to operate for over two minutes, but the sustainer and verniers eventually shut down and the range safety destruct command was issued at T+303 seconds. Since the LOX gel explosion also damaged wiring in the base of the booster, the telemetry system lost power and no data was returned during launch, making it difficult to determine the exact cause of the engine failure. It was believed that damage to a piece of plumbing was the most likely explanation.

The other was a launch of a NOAA weather satellite on May 29, 1980 using Atlas 19F. Performance appeared normal until booster jettison when the trajectory was discovered to be off-course. The sustainer engine kept burning 50 seconds past its normal cutoff time. When the satellite finally separated, it was inserted into a useless elliptical orbit.

The failure was caused by a seal jostled loose by the rapid-fire pyrotechnic cartridge ignition system used in the Atlas E/F missiles, flooding the B-1 turbopump with fuel and slowing down its rotation speed, cutting thrust levels in the engine to 80% and considerably reducing booster velocity and fuel consumption. The Atlas's onboard computer tried to compensate first by extending the booster engine burn time, but eventually a backup command forced booster shutdown and jettison. After BECO, the computer still tried to compensate by extending sustainer burn time until it went nearly a minute past what would have been normal cutoff. Following SECO, the booster also extended solo vernier flight for another 11 seconds. However, for simplicity reasons, the NOAA satellite had no electrical interface with the Atlas, which caused it to fire its posigrade rockets at a pre-set time. Since it was still attached to the Atlas, it was impossible for the spacecraft's small thrusters to orient itself correctly. Thanks to the extended burn time, SECO would now take place at T+377 seconds, but at T+370 seconds, the timer on the satellite automatically activated its solid fueled kick motor with the Atlas's sustainer engine still operating. The LOX tank dome was blown off the Atlas, which registered on telemetry readouts as an instant loss of tank pressure. The satellite separated, but ended up in a useless orbit and had to be abandoned.

Atlas F launches were conducted from Cape Canaveral Air Force Station, at Launch Complexes 11 and 13, and Vandenberg Air Force Base at OSTF-2, LC-576 and SLC-3. A total of 55 Atlas F missile tests were conducted between 1961 and 1974, the post-1965 launches all being tests of reentry vehicles as Atlas had been retired from ICBM service, along with 39 space launches during 1967 to 1981. There were 16 failures.

== See also ==
- SM-65 Atlas
