= Vandenberg Launch Complex 576A =

Rocket launch pads at Vandenberg Space Force Base

Complex 576A
- Location: 34°44′22″N 120°37′09″W
- Short name: 576A
- Operator: US Air Force
- Total launches: a
- Launch pad(s): 576A-1 34°46′36″N 120°36′6″W; 576A-2 34°46′26″N 120°35′18″W; 576A-3 34°46′39″N 120°35′48″W
Launch history
- Status: Inactive
- Launches: 21 / 13 / 20
- First launch: 9 Sep 1959
- Last launch: 17 Mar 1969
- Associated rockets: Atlas-D/E/F

Launch Complex 576A, also known as Area 576, is a group of rocket launch pads at Vandenberg Air Force Base. The pads at the complex were used from 1959 until 1971 to launch SM-65 Atlas missiles. The site was also known as Complex ABRES. Pads in Area 576A include 576-A-1,2,3

The first operational launch of an Atlas missile by the Strategic Air Command was conducted from 576-A-2 by the 576th Strategic Missile Squadron on September 9, 1959. It impacted 4,480 nautical miles (8,300 km) away, near Wake Island.

The three launch sites are:

- 576A-1 34°46′36″N 120°36′6″W
- 576A-2 34°46′26″N 120°35′18″W
- 576A-3 34°46′39″N 120°35′48″W

== 576A-1 ==
Date	Site	Type	Codename
26-Oct-62	576A-1	ATLAS D	CLOSED CIRCUITS
22-Dec-62	576A-1	ATLAS D	FLY HIGH
13-Feb-63	576A-1	ATLAS D	FLAG RACE
16-Mar-63	576A-1	ATLAS D	LEADING EDGE
1-Dec-64	576A-1	ATLAS D	BROOK TROUT
27-Feb-65	576A-1	ATLAS D	DRAG BAR
26-Mar-65	576A-1	ATLAS D	FRESH FROG
8-Jun-65	576A-1	ATLAS D	LEA RING
29-Nov-65	576A-1	ATLAS D	WILD GOAT
10-Feb-66	576A-1	ATLAS D	YEAST CAKE
4-Mar-66	576A-1	ATLAS D	ETERNAL CAMP
19-Mar-66	576A-1	ATLAS D	WHITE BEAR
3-May-66	576A-1	ATLAS D	CRAB CLAW
30-Jun-66	576A-1	ATLAS D	HEAVY ARTILLERY
19-May-67	576A-1	ATLAS F	BUSY PIGSKIN
10-Nov-67	576A-1	ATLAS F	--
26-Feb-68	576A-1	ATLAS F	--
18-Apr-68	576A-1	ATLAS E	--
29-Jun-68	576A-1	ATLAS F	--
27-Sep-68	576A-1	ATLAS F	--
24-Nov-68	576A-1	ATLAS F	--

== 576A-2 ==
Date	Site	Type	Codename
9-Sep-59	576A-2	ATLAS D	DESERT HEAT
5-Aug-65	576A-2	ATLAS F	SEA TRAMP
8-Aug-66	576A-2	ATLAS F	BUSY RAMROD
11-Oct-66	576A-2	ATLAS F	LOW HILL
17-Jan-67	576A-2	ATLAS F	BUSY STEPSON
16-Mar-67	576A-2	ATLAS F	LITTLE CHURCH
29-Jul-67	576A-2	ATLAS F	BREAD HOOK
14-Oct-67	576A-2	ATLAS F	--
6-Apr-68	576A-2	ATLAS F	--
3-May-68	576A-2	ATLAS F	--
1-Jun-68	576A-2	ATLAS F	--
11-Jul-68	576A-2	ATLAS F	--
17-Mar-69	576A-2	ATLAS F	--

== 576A-3 ==
Date	Site	Type	Codename
26-Jan-60	576A-3	ATLAS D	DUAL EXHAUST
12-Dec-62	576A-3	ATLAS D	DEER PARK
31-Jan-63	576A-3	ATLAS D	FAINT CLICK
28-Feb-63	576A-3	ATLAS D	PITCH PINE
12-Jun-63	576A-3	ATLAS D	HARPOON GUN
4-Dec-64	576A-3	ATLAS D	OPERA GLASS
2-Mar-65	576A-3	ATLAS D	PORK BARREL
10-Jun-65	576A-3	ATLAS D	STOCK BOY
13-Feb-67	576A-3	ATLAS F	BUSY BOXER
9-Jun-67	576A-3	ATLAS F	--
22-Jul-67	576A-3	ATLAS F	--
27-Oct-67	576A-3	ATLAS F	--
21-Dec-67	576A-3	ATLAS F	--
31-Jan-68	576A-3	ATLAS F	--
6-Mar-68	576A-3	ATLAS E	--
27-Apr-68	576A-3	ATLAS E	--
22-Jun-68	576A-3	ATLAS F	--
25-Sep-68	576A-3	ATLAS F	--
16-Nov-68	576A-3	ATLAS F	--
16-Jan-69	576A-3	ATLAS F	--
