= Operational Silo Test Facility =

Former rocket launch site at Vandenberg Space Force Base

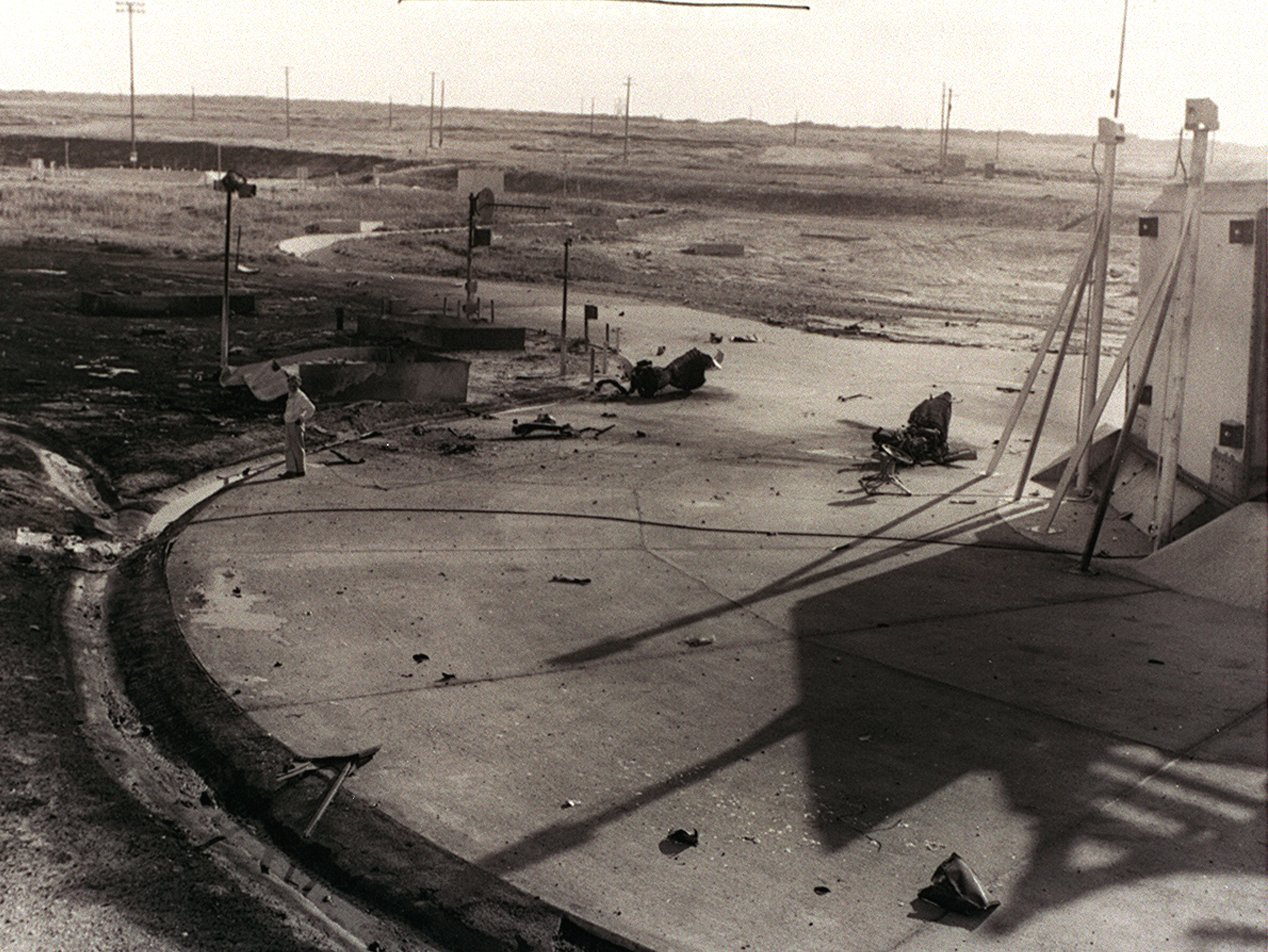
- Vandenberg OSTF after explosion
- Interactive map of Operational Silo Test Facility
- Launch site: Vandenberg Space Force Base, California, US
- Location: 34.804329°N 120.546165°W
- Short name: OSTF
- Operator: United States Air Force
- Launch pad: 3

Launch history
- First launch: 1960
- Last launch: 1965
Launch history
- Status: Destroyed
- Launches: 18
- Associated rockets: Titan I, Atlas E, Atlas F

The Operational Silo Test Facility (OSTF) is a former United States Air Force intercontinental ballistic missile launch facility at Vandenberg Space Force Base, California, United States. It was a developmental launch site for the silo-based Titan and Atlas missile series.

The site was originally constructed for Titan I tests. On 12 December 1960, a fully fueled Titan was lifted to the surface in preparation for launch when the silo elevator collapsed. The missile fell back down into the silo and exploded, damaging the facility so badly that it was abandoned. The first launch of a silo-based missile would take place 1,200 feet (370 m) to the northwest inside the Silo Launch Test Facility (SLTF).

The OSTF complex also included silos for launching Atlas E and F missiles; coffin types for the former and elevator types for the latter. Atlas testing began rather ignominiously when Missile 27E exploded at liftoff on 7 June 1961, putting OSTF-1 (also designated Site F or 576 Foxtrot) out of use for seven months. The facility went on to host another nine Atlas E launches before being decommissioned in 1966.

Operational tests were designed as practice drills for ballistic missile crews and also engineering tests of the missile and silo equipment—they would travel to Vandenberg Air Force Base and launch a randomly selected missile from the inventory, which was then equipped with telemetry and Range Safety destruct packages. Some launches tested reentry vehicles or Nike-Zeus target missiles.

OSTF-2 (also designated Site G or 576 Golf) hosted seven Atlas F launches between 1962 and 1965. This facility received its own baptism of fire on 4 October 1963 when Missile 45F tipped over at liftoff after one engine failed to start. Damage to the silo was not that serious and it hosted the final Atlas R&D flight two months later. Then on 2 April 1964, a repeat disaster happened when Missile 3F failed in virtually identical fashion to 45F. This time OSTF-2 was not used again for six months, after which it hosted the finale Atlas ICBM test, Missile 106F, on 8 January 1965 and was then decommissioned from service.

== Gallery ==
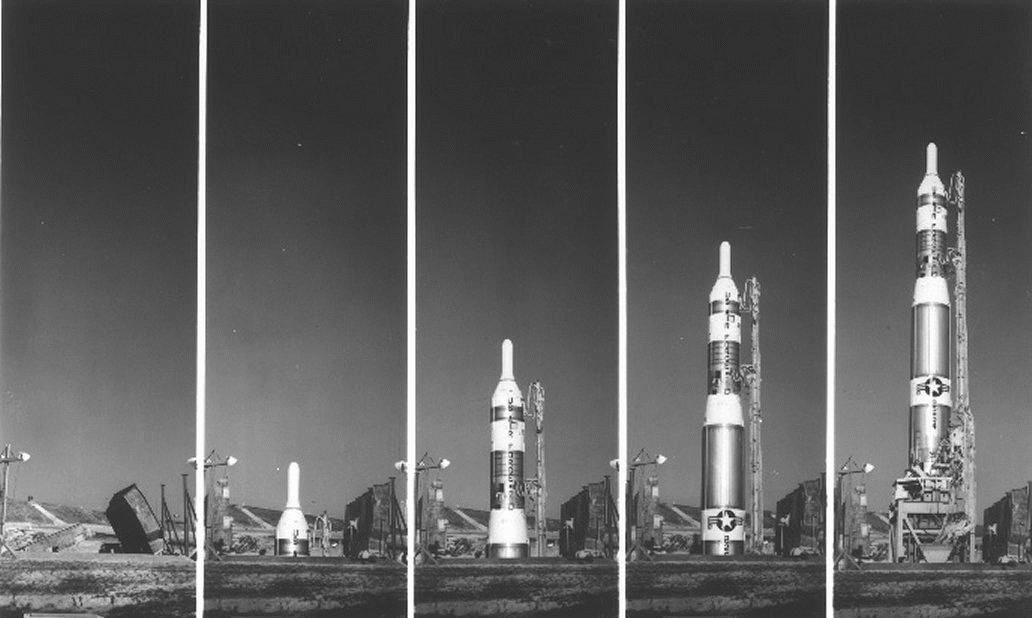
Titan I missile emerges from the silo in 1960

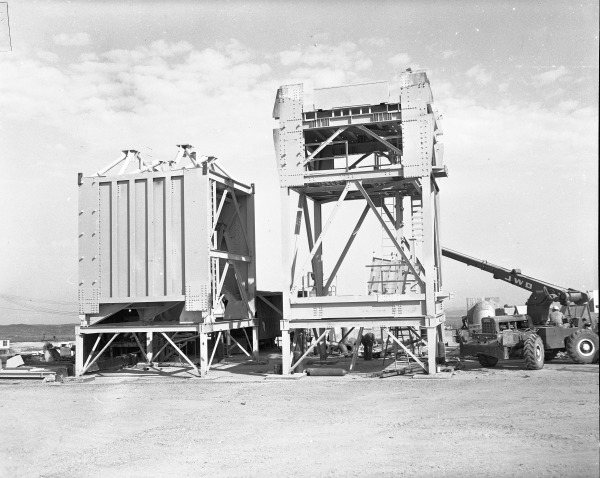
OSTF-2 Platform Launcher in October 1960

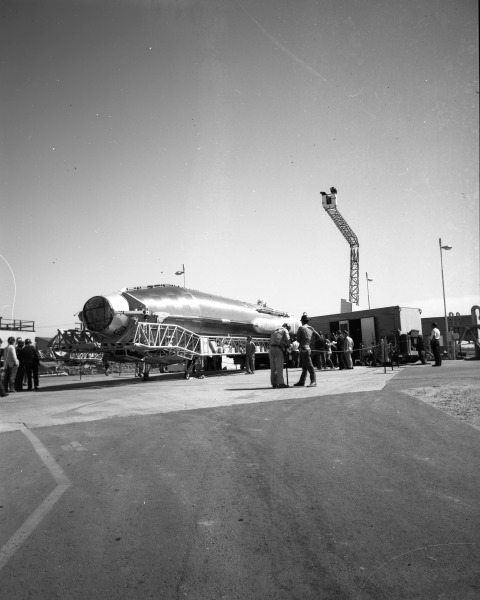
Raising Atlas 3F at OSTF-2 in September 1961

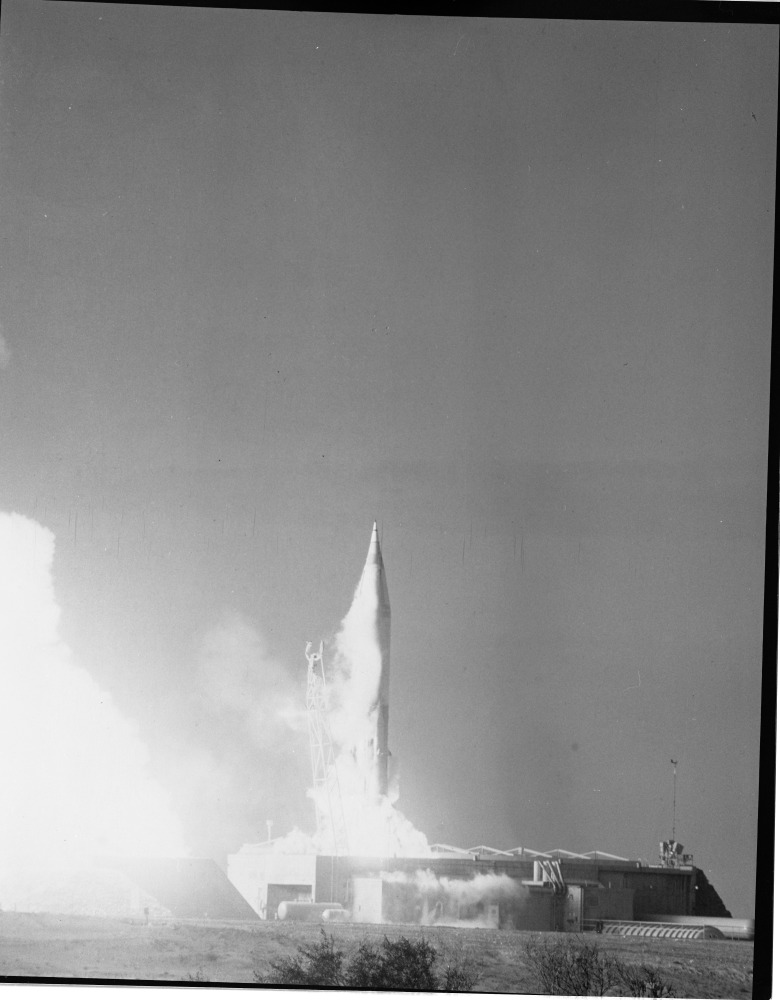
Atlas 64E launch from OSTF-1 in December 1962

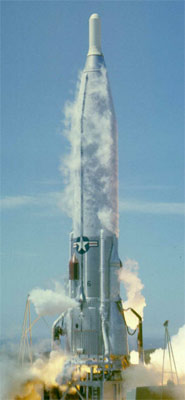
Atlas 3F at OSTF-2 prior to failed launch attempt in April 1964

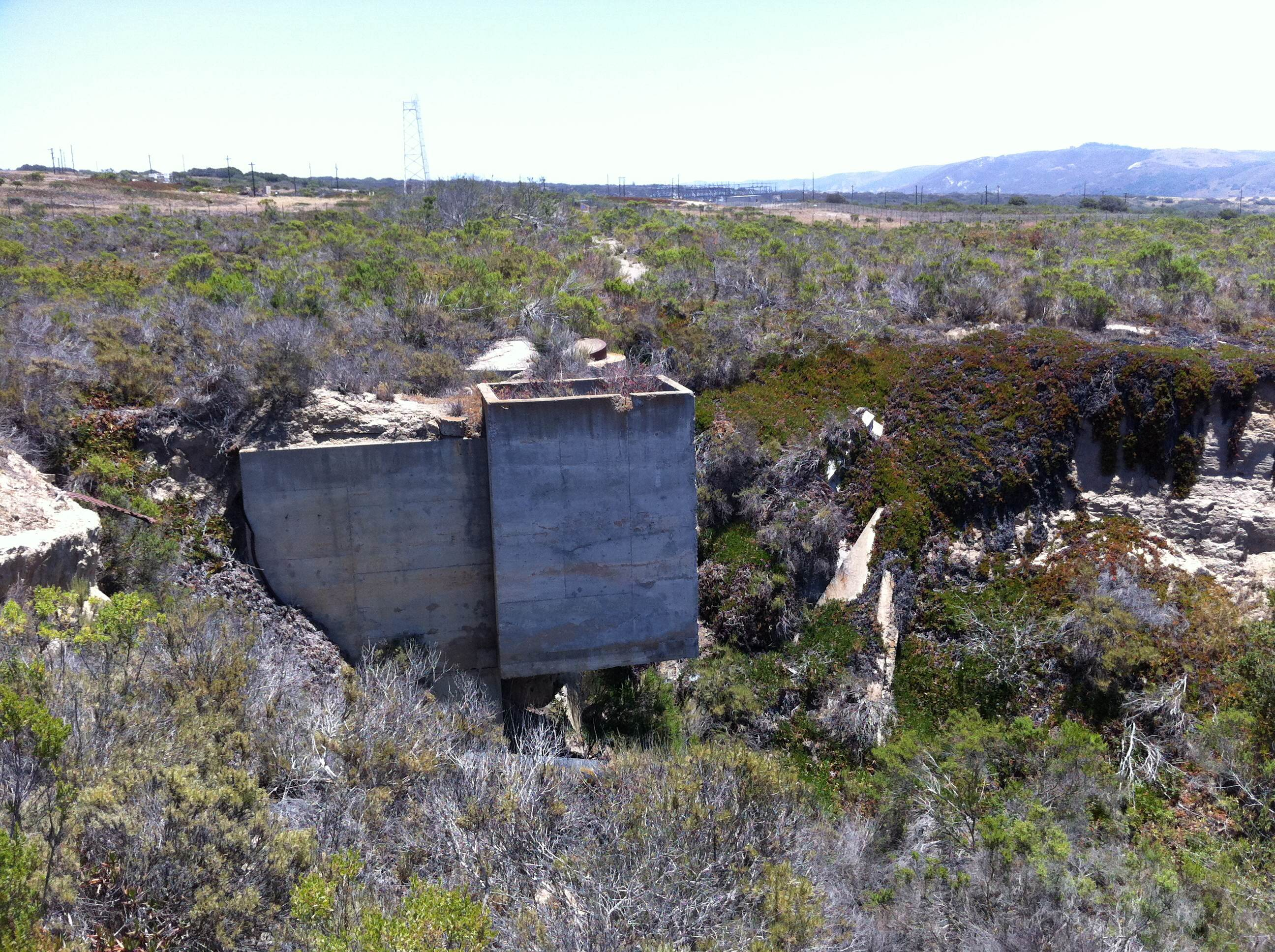
Operational Silo Test Facility in 2014

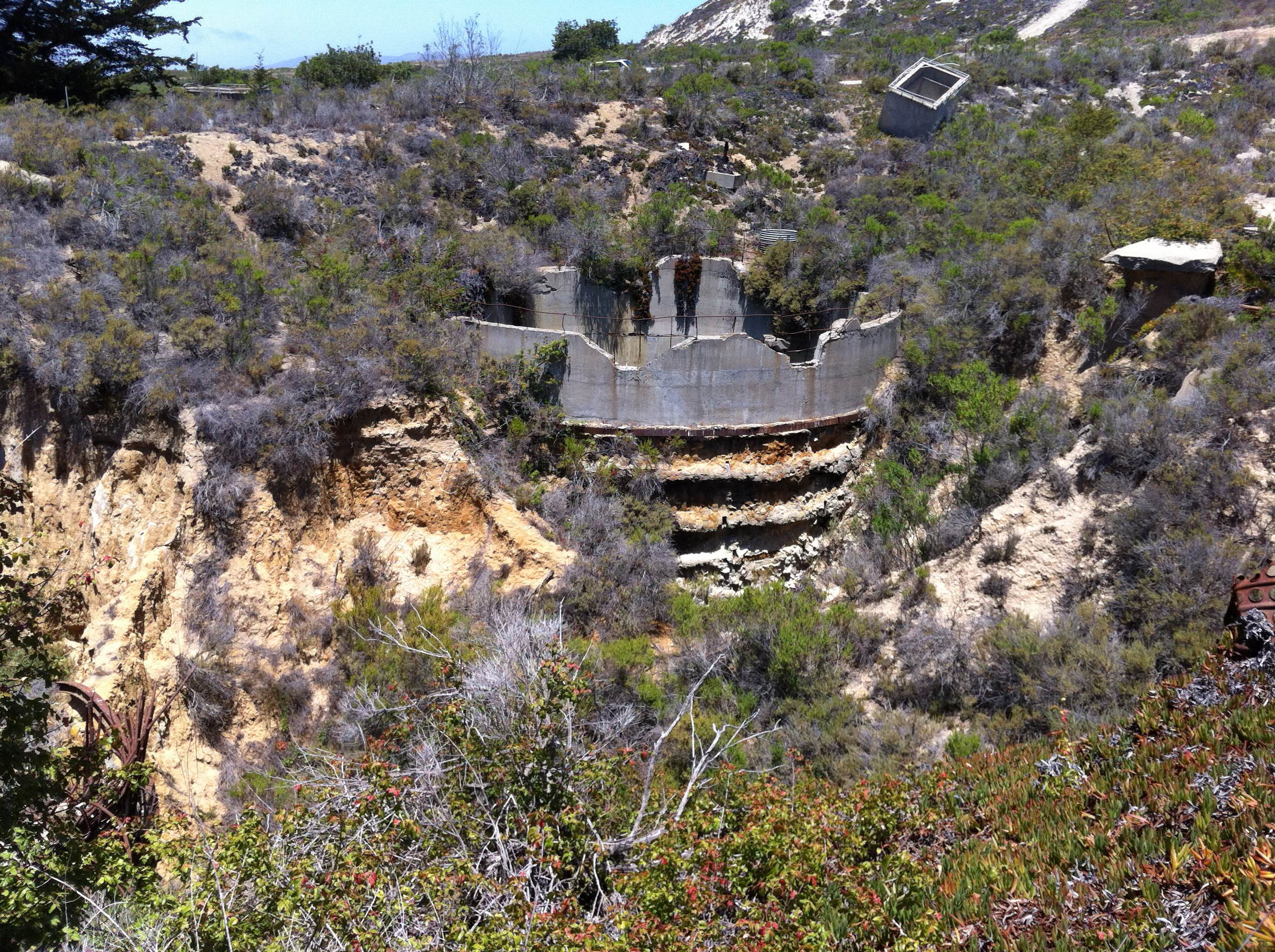
Operational Silo Test Facility in 2014

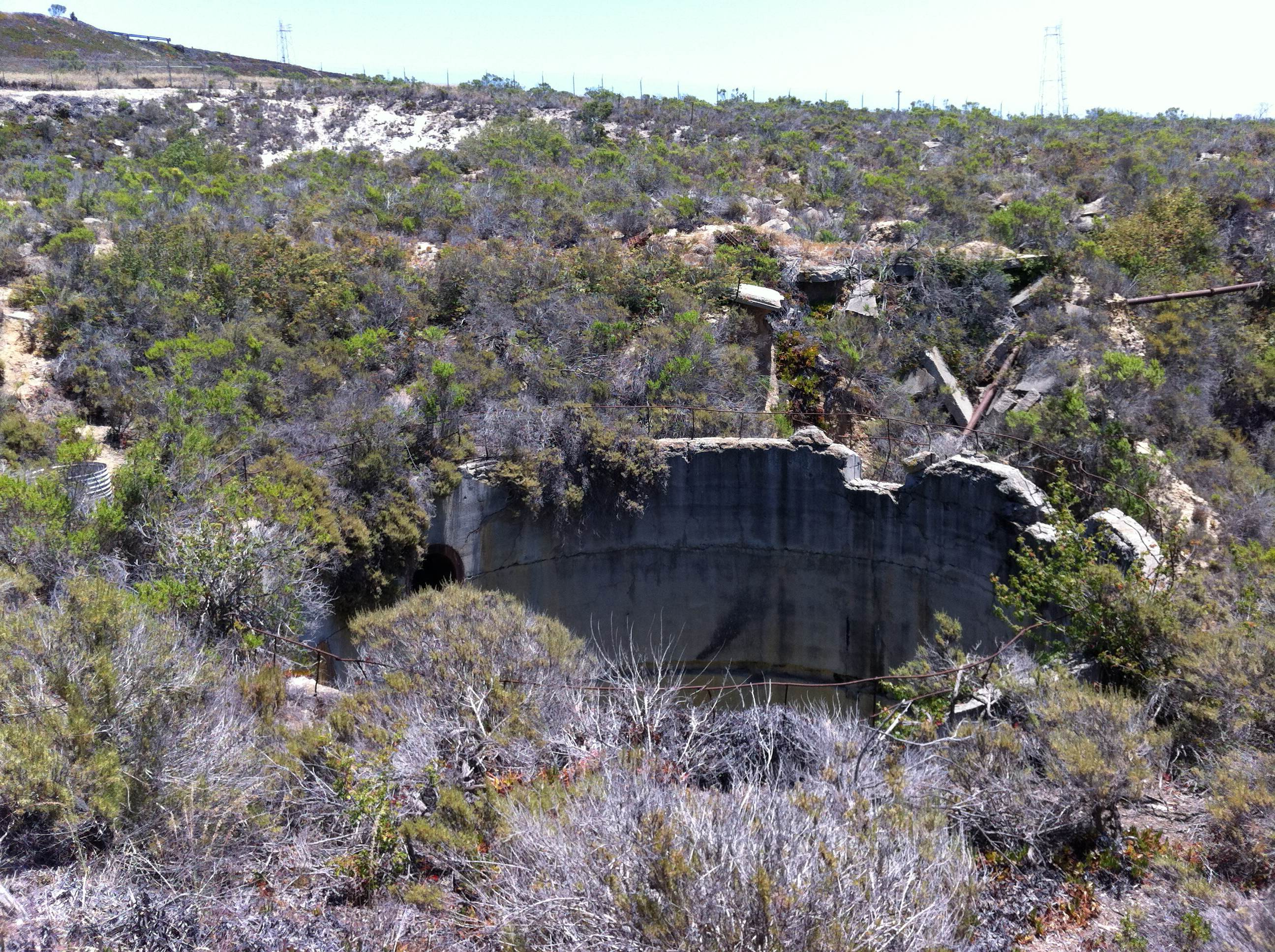
Operational Silo Test Facility in 2014
