= List of OPS Satellites =

List of satellites launched by the United States Air Force

This is a list of satellites and spacecraft that have been given OPS designations by the United States Air Force. These designations have been applied to most United States military satellites launched from 1963 to 1984, and after 1984 the designations was changed into the USA designation.

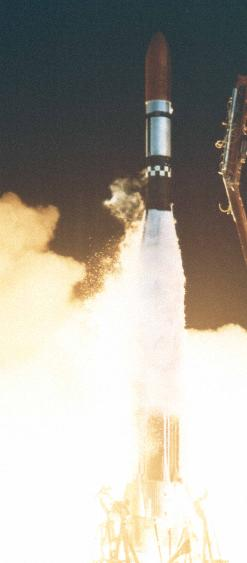
Launch of Vela 2A & B satellite also known as OPS 3662 & 3674

== 1963-65 ==
Number	Launch date	COSPAR-ID	Other designations	Launch vehicle	Function	Status	Remarks
OPS 0048	1963-01-07		KH-4 18	Thor-DM-21 Agena-D	Reconnaissance		
OPS 0180	1963-01-16		P-698BK Group 1-D 1	Thor-DM-21 Agena-B	Reconnaissance		
OPS 0240	1963-02-19		DSAP-1 F3	Scout-X3M	Meteorology		
OPS 0583	1963-02-28		KH-4 19	Thor-SLV2A Agena-B	Reconnaissance	Launch Failure	
OPS 0627	1963-03-18		KH-6 1	Thor-SLV2A Agena-D	Reconnaissance	Launch Failure	
OPS 0720	1963-04-01		KH-4 20	Thor-SLV2A Agena-D	Reconnaissance		
OPS 1008	1963-04-26		KH-5 8	Thor-SLV2A Agena-D	Reconnaissance		
OPS 0924	1963-05-18		KH-6 2	Thor-SLV2A Agena-D	Reconnaissance		
OPS 0954	1963-06-12		KH-4 21	Thor-SLV2A Agena-D	Reconnaissance		
OPS 0999	1963-06-27		KH-4 22	Thor-SLV2A Agena-D	Reconnaissance		
OPS 1440	1963-06-29		P-698BK Group 1-D 2	Thor-SLV2A Agena-D	Reconnaissance		
OPS 1467	1963-07-12		KH-7 1	Thor-SLV2A Agena-D	Reconnaissance		
OPS 1226	1963-07-19		KH-4 23	Thor-SLV2A Agena-D	Reconnaissance		
OPS 1370	1963-07-31		KH-6 3	Thor-SLV2A Agena-D	Reconnaissance		
OPS 1419	1963-08-25		KH-4A 1	Thor-SLV2A Agena-D	Reconnaissance		
OPS 1561	1963-08-29		KH-5 9	Thor-SLV2A Agena-D	Reconnaissance		
OPS 1947	1963-09-06		KH-7 2	Thor-SLV2A Agena-D	Reconnaissance		
OPS 1353	1963-09-23		KH-4A 2	Thor-SLV2A Agena-D	Reconnaissance		
OPS 2196	1963-10-25		KH-7 3	Thor-SLV2A Agena-D	Reconnaissance		
OPS 2437	1963-10-29		KH-5 10	Thor-SLV2A Agena-D	Reconnaissance		
OPS 2268	1963-11-09		KH-4 24	Thor-SLV2A Agena-D	Reconnaissance	Launch Failure	
OPS 2260	1963-11-27		KH-4 25	Thor-SLV2A Agena-D	Reconnaissance		
OPS 2372	1963-12-18		KH-7 4	Thor-SLV2A Agena-D	Reconnaissance		
OPS 1388	1963-12-21		KH-4 26	Thor-SLV2A Agena-D	Reconnaissance		
OPS 3367A	1964-01-19		DSAP-1 F6	Thor-DM-21 Agena-D	Meteorology		
OPS 3367B	1964-01-19		DSAP-1 F7	Thor-DM-21 Agena-D	Meteorology		
OPS 3444	1964-02-15		KH-4A 3	Thor-SLV2A Agena-D	Reconnaissance		
OPS 2423	1964-02-25		KH-7 5	Atlas-LV3 Agena-D	Reconnaissance		
OPS 3722	1964-02-28		P-698BK Group 1-A 1	Thor-SLV2A Agena-D	Reconnaissance		
OPS 3435	1964-03-11		KH-7 6	Atlas-LV3 Agena-D	Reconnaissance		
OPS 3467	1964-03-24		KH-4A 4	Thor-SLV2A Agena-D	Reconnaissance	Launch Failure	
OPS 3743	1964-04-23		KH-7 7	Atlas-LV3 Agena-D	Reconnaissance		
OPS 2921	1964-04-27		KH-4A 5	Thor-SLV2A Agena-D	Reconnaissance		
OPS 3592	1964-05-19		KH-7 8	Atlas-LV3 Agena-D	Reconnaissance		
OPS 4412	1964-06-04		Transit-5C 1	Scout-X4	Navigation		
OPS 3483	1964-06-04		KH-4A 6	Thor-SLV2A Agena-D	Reconnaissance		
OPS 3236	1964-06-13		KH-5 11	Thor-SLV2A Agena-D	Reconnaissance		
OPS 4467A	1964-06-18		DSAP-1 F8	Thor-DM-21 Agena-D	Meteorology		
OPS 4467B	1964-06-18		DSAP-1 F9	Thor-DM-21 Agena-D	Meteorology		
OPS 3754	1964-06-19		KH-4A 7	Thor-DM-21 Agena-D	Reconnaissance		
OPS 3395	1964-07-02		P-698BK Group 2-D 2	Thor-SLV2A Agena-D	Reconnaissance		
OPS 3684	1964-07-06		KH-7 9	Atlas-LV3 Agena-D	Reconnaissance		
OPS 4923	1964-07-06		Noah's Ark	Atlas-LV3 Agena-D	Reconnaissance		
OPS 3491	1964-07-10		KH-4A 8	Thor-SLV2A Agena-D	Reconnaissance		
OPS 3662	1964-07-17		Vela 3	Atlas-LV3 Agena-D	Nuclear Detection		
OPS 3674	1964-07-17		Vela 4	Atlas-LV3 Agena-D	Nuclear Detection		
OPS 3042	1964-08-05		KH-4A 9	Thor-SLV2A Agena-D	Reconnaissance		
OPS 3802	1964-08-14		KH-7 10	Atlas-SLV3 Agena-D	Reconnaissance		
OPS 3316	1964-08-14		Hitchhiker 3	Atlas-SLV3 Agena-D	Technology demonstration		
OPS 2739	1964-08-21		KH-5 12	Thor-SLV2A Agena-D	Reconnaissance		
OPS 3497	1964-09-14		KH-4A 10	Thor-SLV2A Agena-D	Reconnaissance		
OPS 4262	1964-09-23		KH-7 11	Atlas-SLV3 Agena-D	Reconnaissance		
OPS 3333	1964-10-05		KH-4A 11	Thor-SLV2A Agena-D	Reconnaissance		
OPS 5798	1964-10-06		Transit-O 1	Thor-DSV2A Ablestar	Navigation		
OPS 4036	1964-10-07		KH-7 12	Atlas-SLV3 Agena-D	Reconnaissance	Failure	
OPS 3559	1964-10-17		KH-4A 12	Thor-SLV2A Agena-D	Reconnaissance		
OPS 4384	1964-10-23		KH-7 13	Atlas-LV3 Agena-D	Reconnaissance		
OPS 5063	1964-10-23		Step Thirteen/Plymouth Rock 3	Atlas-LV3 Agena-D	Reconnaissance		
OPS 5434	1964-11-02		KH-4A 13	Thor-SLV2A Agena-D	Reconnaissance		
OPS 3062	1964-11-04		P-698BK Group 3-D 1	Thor-SLV2A Agena-D	Reconnaissance		
OPS 3360	1964-11-18		KH-4A 14	Thor-SLV2A Agena-D	Reconnaissance		
OPS 4439	1964-12-04		KH-7 14	Atlas-SLV3 Agena-D	Reconnaissance		
OPS 6582	1964-12-13		Transit-O 2	Thor-DSV2A Ablestar	Navigation		
OPS 3358	1964-12-19		KH-4A 15	Thor-SLV2A Agena-D	Reconnaissance		
OPS 3762	1964-12-21		Quill 1	Thor-SLV2A Agena-D	Reconnaissance		
OPS 3928	1965-01-15		KH-4A 16	Thor-SLV2A Agena-D	Reconnaissance		
OPS 7040	1965-01-19		DSAP-1 F10	Thor-Burner	Meteorology	Partial Failure	
OPS 4703	1965-01-23		KH-7 15	Atlas-Agena	Reconnaissance		
OPS 4782	1965-02-25		KH-4A 17	Thor-Agena	Reconnaissance		
OPS 4988	1965-03-09		Poppy 4B	Thor-Agena	SIGINT		
OPS 7087	1965-03-11		Transit-O 3	Thor-Ablestar	Navigation	Partial Failure	
OPS 4920	1965-03-12		KH-7 16	Atlas-SLV3 Agena-D	Reconnaissance		
OPS 7353	1965-03-18		DSAP-1 F11	Thor-LV2D Burner-1	Meteorology		
OPS 4803	1965-03-25		KH-4A 18	Thor-SLV2A Agena-D	Reconnaissance		
OPS 4682	1965-04-03		SNAPSHOT	Atlas-SLV3 Agena-D	Technology demonstration		
OPS 4983	1965-04-28		KH-7 17	Atlas-SLV3 Agena-D	Reconnaissance		
OPS 6717	1965-04-28		Pundit 4	Atlas-SLV3 Agena-D	Reconnaissance		
OPS 5023	1965-04-29		KH-4A 19	Thor-SLV2A Agena-D	Reconnaissance		
OPS 8431	1965-05-18		KH-4A 20	Thor-SLV2A Agena-D	Reconnaissance		
OPS 8386	1965-05-20		DSAP-3 F1	Thor-LV2D Burner-1	Meteorology		
OPS 5236	1965-05-27		KH-7 18	Atlas-SLV3 Agena-D	Reconnaissance		
OPS 8425	1965-06-09		KH-4A 21	Thor-SLV2A Agena-D	Reconnaissance		
OPS 8480	1965-06-24		Transit-O 4	Thor-DSV2A Able-Star	Navigation		
OPS 5501	1965-06-25		KH-7 19	Atlas-SLV3 Agena-D	Reconnaissance		
OPS 6749	1965-06-25		Fanion 1/Tripos 1	Atlas-SLV3 Agena-D	Reconnaissance		
OPS 5810	1965-07-12		KH-7 20	Atlas-SLV3 Agena-D	Reconnaissance	Failure	
OPS 8411	1965-07-17		P-770 Group 3-A 1	Thor-SLV2A Agena-D	Reconnaissance		
OPS 5543	1965-07-19		KH-4A 22	Thor-SLV2A Agena-D	Reconnaissance		
OPS 6577	1965-07-20		Vela 5	Atlas-LV3 Agena-D	Nuclear Detection		
OPS 6564	1965-07-20		Vela 6	Atlas-LV3 Agena-D	Nuclear Detection		
OPS 5698	1965-08-03		KH-7 21	Atlas-SLV3 Agena-D	Reconnaissance		
OPS 6761	1965-08-03		Magnum	Atlas-SLV3 Agena-D	Reconnaissance		
OPS 8464	1965-08-13		Transit-O 5	Thor-DSV2A Able-Star	Navigation		
OPS 7208	1965-08-17		KH-4A 23	Thor-SLV2A Agena-D	Reconnaissance		
OPS 3373	1965-09-02		MRPV	Thor-DM21 Agena-D	Technology demonstration		
OPS 8068	1965-09-10		DSAP-2 F1	Thor-LV2D Burner-1	Meteorology		
OPS 7221	1965-09-22		KH-4A 24	Thor-SLV2A Agena-D	Reconnaissance		
OPS 7208	1965-09-30		KH-7 22	Atlas-SLV3 Agena-D	Reconnaissance		
OPS 5325	1965-10-05		KH-4A 25	Thor-SLV2A Agena-D	Reconnaissance		
OPS 2155	1965-10-28		KH-4A 26	Thor-SLV2A Agena-D	Reconnaissance		
OPS 6232	1965-11-08		KH-7 23	Atlas-SLV3 Agena-D	Reconnaissance		
OPS 8293	1965-11-08		Auroral	Atlas-SLV3 Agena-D	Reconnaissance		
OPS 7249	1965-12-09		KH-4A 27	Thor-SLV2A Agena-D	Reconnaissance		
OPS 1509	1965-12-22		Transit-O 6	Scout-A	Navigation		
OPS 4639	1965-12-24		KH-4A 28	Thor-SLV2A Agena-D	Reconnaissance		

== 1966-70 ==
Number	Launch date	COSPAR-ID	Other designations	Launch vehicle	Function	Status	Remarks
OPS 2394	1966-01-06		DSAP-2 F2	Thor-LV2D Burner-1	Meteorology	Failure	
OPS 7253	1966-01-19		KH-7 24	Atlas-SLV3 Agena-D	Reconnaissance		
OPS 3179	1966-01-19		-	Atlas-SLV3 Agena-D	Technology demonstration		
OPS 1593	1966-01-28		Transit-O 7	Scout A	Navigation		
OPS 7291	1966-02-02		KH-4A 29	Thor-SLV2A Agena-D	Reconnaissance		
OPS 1439	1966-02-09		P-770 Group 3-D 2	Thor-SLV2A Agena-D	Reconnaissance		
OPS 1184	1966-02-15		KH-7 25	Atlas-SLV3 Agena-D	Reconnaissance		
OPS 3011	1966-02-15		Bluebell 2C	Atlas-SLV3 Agena-D	Calibration		
OPS 3031	1966-02-15		Bluebell 2S	Atlas-SLV3 Agena-D	Calibration		
OPS 3488	1966-03-09		KH-4A 30	Thor-SLV2A Agena-D	Reconnaissance		
OPS 0879	1966-03-18		KH-7 26	Atlas-SLV3 Agena-D	Reconnaissance		
OPS 0794	1966-03-18		NRL-PL 137	Atlas-SLV3 Agena-D	Technology demonstration		
OPS 1117	1966-03-26		Transit-O 8	Scout A	Navigation		
OPS 0340	1966-03-31		DSAP-2 F3	Thor-LV2D Burner-1	Meteorology		
OPS 1612	1966-04-07		KH-4A 31	Thor-SLV2A Agena-D	Reconnaissance		
OPS 0910	1966-04-19		KH-7 27	Atlas-SLV3 Agena-D	Reconnaissance		
OPS 1527	1966-04-22		OV3 1	Scout B	Technology demonstration		
OPS 1508	1966-05-03		KH-4A 32	Thor-SLV2A Agena-D	Reconnaissance	Failure	
OPS 1950	1966-05-19		KH-7 28	Atlas-SLV3 Agena-D	Reconnaissance		
OPS 6785	1966-05-19		Leige / Plicat	Atlas-SLV3 Agena-D	Reconnaissance		
OPS 0082	1966-05-19		Transit-O 9	Scout A	Navigation		
OPS 1778	1966-05-24		KH-4A 33	Thor-SLV2A Agena-D	Reconnaissance		
OPS 1577	1966-06-03		KH-7 29	Atlas-SLV3 Agena-D	Reconnaissance		
OPS 1856	1966-06-03		-	Atlas-SLV3 Agena-D	Technology demonstration		
OPS 1960	1966-06-09		RTS-1 1	Atlas-SLV3 Agena-D	Early warning		
OPS 1427	1966-06-10		OV3 4	Scout B	Technology demonstration		
OPS 9311	1966-06-16		IDCSP 1	Titan IIIC	Communications		
OPS 9312	1966-06-16		IDCSP 2	Titan IIIC	Communications		
OPS 9313	1966-06-16		IDCSP 3	Titan IIIC	Communications		
OPS 9314	1966-06-16		IDCSP 4	Titan IIIC	Communications		
OPS 9315	1966-06-16		IDCSP 5	Titan IIIC	Communications		
OPS 9316	1966-06-16		IDCSP 6	Titan IIIC	Communications		
OPS 9317	1966-06-16		IDCSP 7	Titan IIIC	Communications		
OPS 9381	1966-06-16		GGTS-1	Titan IIIC	Technology demonstration		
OPS 1599	1966-06-21		KH-4A 34	Thor-SLV2A Agena-D	Reconnaissance		
OPS 1850	1966-07-12		KH-7 30	Atlas-SLV3 Agena-D	Reconnaissance		
OPS 3014	1966-07-29		KH-8 1	Titan-3B Agena-D	Reconnaissance		
OPS 1545	1966-08-09		KH-4A 35	Thorad-SLV2G Agena-D	Reconnaissance		
OPS 1832	1966-08-16		KH-7 31	Atlas-SLV3 Agena-D	Reconnaissance		
OPS 6810	1966-08-16		Sampan 1 / Sousea 1	Atlas-SLV3 Agena-D	Reconnaissance		
OPS 2366	1966-08-18		Transit-O 10	Scout A	Navigation		
OPS 0856	1966-08-19		RTS-1 2	Atlas-SLV3 Agena-D	Early warning		
OPS 6026	1966-09-16		DSAP-4 F1	Thor-LV2F Burner-2	Meteorology		
OPS 1686	1966-09-16		KH-7 32	Atlas-SLV3 Agena-D	Reconnaissance		
OPS 6874	1966-09-16		Fanion 2 / Tripos 2	Atlas-SLV3 Agena-D	Reconnaissance		
OPS 1703	1966-09-20		KH-4A 36	Thor-SLV2A Agena-D	Reconnaissance		
OPS 4096	1966-09-28		KH-8 2	Titan-3B Agena-D	Reconnaissance		
OPS 1920	1966-10-05		RTS-1 3	Atlas-SLV3 Agena-D	Early warning		
OPS 2055	1966-10-12		KH-7 33	Atlas-SLV3 Agena-D	Reconnaissance		
OPS 5345	1966-10-12		SGLS 1	Atlas-SLV3 Agena-D	Technology demonstration		
OPS 2070	1966-11-02		KH-7 34	Atlas-SLV3 Agena-D	Reconnaissance		
OPS 5424	1966-11-02		-	Atlas-SLV3 Agena-D	Technology demonstration		
OPS 0855	1966-11-03		OV4-3	Titan IIIC	Technology demonstration		Carried Gemini B spacecraft.
OPS 1866	1966-11-08		KH-4A 37	Thorad-SLV2G Agena-D	Reconnaissance		
OPS 1890	1966-12-05		KH-7 35	Atlas-SLV3 Agena-D	Reconnaissance		
OPS 8968	1966-12-14		KH-8 3	Titan-3B Agena-D	Reconnaissance		
OPS 1584	1966-12-29		Multigroup 1	Thor-SLV2A Agena-D	Reconnaissance		
OPS 1664	1967-01-14		KH-4A 38	Thor-SLV2A Agena-D	Reconnaissance		
OPS 9321	1967-01-18		IDCSP 8	Titan IIIC	Communications		
OPS 9322	1967-01-18		IDCSP 9	Titan IIIC	Communications		
OPS 9323	1967-01-18		IDCSP 10	Titan IIIC	Communications		
OPS 9324	1967-01-18		IDCSP 11	Titan IIIC	Communications		
OPS 9325	1967-01-18		IDCSP 12	Titan IIIC	Communications		
OPS 9326	1967-01-18		IDCSP 13	Titan IIIC	Communications		
OPS 9327	1967-01-18		IDCSP 14	Titan IIIC	Communications		
OPS 9328	1967-01-18		IDCSP 15	Titan IIIC	Communications		
OPS 4399	1967-02-02		KH-7 36	Atlas-SLV3 Agena-D	Reconnaissance		
OPS 6073	1967-02-08		DSAP-4A F2	Thor-LV2F Burner-2	Meteorology		
OPS 4750	1967-02-22		KH-4A 39	Thor-SLV2A Agena-D	Reconnaissance		
OPS 4204	1967-02-24		KH-8 4	Titan-3B Agena-D	Reconnaissance		
OPS 4779	1967-03-30		KH-4A 40	Thor-SLV2A Agena-D	Reconnaissance		
OPS 0110	1967-04-14		Transit-O 12	Scout A	Navigation		
OPS 4243	1967-04-26		KH-8 5	Titan-3B Agena-D	Reconnaissance	Failure	
OPS 6638	1967-04-28		Vela 7	Titan IIIC	Nuclear Detection		
OPS 6679	1967-04-28		Vela 8	Titan IIIC	Nuclear Detection		
OPS 4696	1967-05-09		KH-4A 41	Thorad-SLV2G Agena-D	Reconnaissance		
OPS 1967	1967-05-09		Fanion 3 / Slewto	Thorad-SLV2G Agena-D	Reconnaissance		
OPS 7218	1967-05-18		Transit-O 18	Scout A	Navigation		
OPS 4321	1967-05-22		KH-7 37	Atlas-SLV3 Agena-D	Reconnaissance		
OPS 5557	1967-05-22		LOGACS	Atlas-SLV3 Agena-D	Technology demonstration		
OPS 5712	1967-05-31		-	Thor-DM-21 Agena-D	Technology demonstration		
OPS 3559	1967-06-16		KH-4A 42	Thorad-SLV2G Agena-D	Reconnaissance		
OPS 1873	1967-06-16		Savant 1	Thorad-SLV2G Agena-D	Reconnaissance		
OPS 4282	1967-06-20		KH-8 6	Titan-3B Agena-D	Reconnaissance		
OPS 9331	1967-07-01		IDCSP 16	Titan IIIC	Communications		
OPS 9332	1967-07-01		IDCSP 17	Titan IIIC	Communications		
OPS 9333	1967-07-01		IDCSP 18	Titan IIIC	Communications		
OPS 9334	1967-07-01		IDCSP 19-DATS	Titan IIIC	Communications		
OPS 1879	1967-07-25		Multigroup 2	Thor-SLV2A Agena-D	Reconnaissance		
OPS 4827	1967-08-07		KH-4A 43	Thorad-SLV2G Agena-D	Reconnaissance		
OPS 4886	1967-07-16		KH-8 7	Titan-3B Agena-D	Reconnaissance		
OPS 7202	1967-07-23		DSAP-4A F3	Thor-LV2F Burner-2	Meteorology		
OPS 5089	1967-09-15		KH-4B 1	Thorad-SLV2G Agena-D	Reconnaissance		
OPS 4941	1967-09-19		KH-8 8	Titan-3B Agena-D	Reconnaissance		
OPS 4947	1967-09-25		Transit-O 14	Scout A	Navigation		
OPS 1264	1967-10-11		DSAP-4A F4	Thor-LV2F Burner-2	Meteorology		
OPS 4995	1967-10-25		KH-8 9	Titan-3B Agena-D	Reconnaissance		
OPS 0562	1967-11-02		KH-4A 44	Thorad-SLV2G Agena-D	Reconnaissance		
OPS 5000	1967-12-05		KH-8 10	Titan-3B Agena-D	Reconnaissance		
OPS 1001	1967-12-09		KH-4B 2	Thorad-SLV2G Agena-D	Reconnaissance		
OPS 1965	1968-01-17		Multigroup 3	Thor-SLV2A Agena-D	Reconnaissance		
OPS 5028	1968-01-18		KH-8 11	Titan-3B Agena-D	Reconnaissance		
OPS 2243	1968-01-24		KH-4A 45	Thorad-SLV2G Agena-D	Reconnaissance		
OPS 7034	1968-03-02		Transit-O 18	Scout A	Navigation		
OPS 5057	1968-03-13		KH-8 12	Titan-3B Agena-D	Reconnaissance		
OPS 4849	1968-03-14		KH-4A 46	Thorad-SLV2G Agena-D	Reconnaissance		
OPS 7076	1968-03-14		Lampan 1/Sampan 2	Thorad-SLV2G Agena-D	Reconnaissance		
OPS 5105	1968-04-17		KH-8 13	Titan-3B Agena-D	Reconnaissance		
OPS 1419	1968-05-01		KH-4B 3	Thorad-SLV2G Agena-D	Reconnaissance		
OPS 7869	1968-05-23		DSAP-4B F1	Thor-LV2F Burner-2	Meteorology		
OPS 5138	1968-06-05		KH-8 14	Titan-3B Agena-D	Reconnaissance		
OPS 9341	1968-06-13		IDCSP 20	Titan IIIC	Communications		
OPS 9342	1968-06-13		IDCSP 21	Titan IIIC	Communications		
OPS 9343	1968-06-13		IDCSP 22	Titan IIIC	Communications		
OPS 9344	1968-06-13		IDCSP 23	Titan IIIC	Communications		
OPS 9345	1968-06-13		IDCSP 24	Titan IIIC	Communications		
OPS 9346	1968-06-13		IDCSP 25	Titan IIIC	Communications		
OPS 9347	1968-06-13		IDCSP 26	Titan IIIC	Communications		
OPS 9348	1968-06-13		IDCSP 27	Titan IIIC	Communications		
OPS 5343	1968-06-20		KH-4A 47	Thorad-SLV2G Agena-D	Reconnaissance		
OPS 5259	1968-06-20		Tripos 3 / Sousea 2	Thorad-SLV2G Agena-D	Reconnaissance		
OPS 2222	1968-08-06		Canyon 1	Atlas-SLV3A Agena-D	Reconnaissance		
OPS 5187	1968-08-06		KH-8 15	Titan-3B Agena-D	Reconnaissance		
OPS 5955	1968-08-07		KH-4B 4	Thorad-SLV2G Agena-D	Reconnaissance		
OPS 5247	1968-09-10		KH-8 16	Titan-3B Agena-D	Reconnaissance		
OPS 0165	1968-09-18		KH-4A 48	Thorad-SLV2G Agena-D	Reconnaissance		
OPS 8595	1968-09-18		Vampan 1	Thorad-SLV2G Agena-D	Reconnaissance		
OPS 0964	1968-10-05		Strawman 1	Thorad-SLV2G Agena-D	Reconnaissance		
OPS 4078	1968-10-23		DSAP-4B F2	Thor-LV2F Burner-2	Meteorology		
OPS 1315	1968-11-03		KH-4B 5	Thorad-SLV2G Agena-D	Reconnaissance		
OPS 5296	1968-11-18		KH-8 17	Titan-3B Agena-D	Reconnaissance		
OPS 6518	1968-12-04		KH-8 18	Titan-3B Agena-D	Reconnaissance	Partial Failure	
OPS 4740	1968-12-12		KH-4A 49	Thorad-SLV2G Agena-D	Reconnaissance		
OPS 7684	1968-12-12		P-801 1	Thorad-SLV2G Agena-D	Communications		
OPS 7585	1969-01-22		KH-8 19	Titan-3B Agena-D	Reconnaissance	Partial Failure	
OPS 3890	1969-02-05		KH-4B 6	Thorad-SLV2G Agena-D	Reconnaissance		
OPS 2644	1969-02-05		P-801 2	Thorad-SLV2G Agena-D	Communications		
OPS 0757	1969-02-09		TACOMSAT (TACSAT 1)	Titan-IIIC	Communications		
OPS 4248	1969-03-04		KH-8 20	Titan-3B Agena-D	Reconnaissance		
OPS 3722	1969-03-19		KH-4A 50	Thorad-SLV2G Agena-D	Reconnaissance		
OPS 2285	1969-03-19		Tivoli 2	Thorad-SLV2G Agena-D	Reconnaissance		
OPS 3148	1969-04-13		Canyon 2	Atlas-SLV3A Agena-D	Reconnaissance		
OPS 5310	1969-04-15		KH-8 21	Titan-3B Agena-D	Reconnaissance		
OPS 1101	1969-05-02		KH-4A 51	Thorad-SLV2G Agena-D	Reconnaissance		
OPS 1721	1969-05-02		Lampan 2 / Sampan 3	Thorad-SLV2G Agena-D	Reconnaissance		
OPS 6909	1969-05-23		Vela 9	Titan IIIC	Nuclear Detection		
OPS 6911	1969-05-23		Vela 10	Titan IIIC	Nuclear Detection		
OPS 1077	1969-06-03		KH-8 22	Titan-3B Agena-D	Reconnaissance		
OPS 1127	1969-07-23		DSAP-4B F3	Thor-LV2F Burner-2	Meteorology		
OPS 3654	1969-07-24		KH-4B 7	Thorad-SLV2H Agena-D	Reconnaissance		
OPS 8285	1969-07-31		Strawman 2	Thorad-SLV2G Agena-D	Reconnaissance		
OPS 7807	1969-08-23		KH-8 23	Titan-3(23)B Agena-D	Reconnaissance		
OPS 3531	1969-09-22		KH-4A 52	Thorad-SLV2G Agena-D	Reconnaissance		
OPS 4710	1969-09-22		Savant 2	Thorad-SLV2G Agena-D	Reconnaissance		
OPS 1807	1969-09-30		Weston	Thorad-SLV2G Agena-D	Reconnaissance		
OPS 8455	1969-10-24		KH-8 24	Titan-3(23)B Agena-D	Reconnaissance		
OPS 6617	1969-12-04		KH-4B 8	Thorad-SLV2H Agena-D	Reconnaissance		
OPS 6531	1970-01-14		KH-8 25	Titan-3B Agena-D	Reconnaissance		
OPS 0054	1970-02-11		DSAP-5A F1	Thor-LV2F Burner-2	Meteorology		
OPS 0440	1970-03-04		KH-4B 9	Thorad-SLV2H Agena-D	Reconnaissance		
OPS 3402	1970-03-04		Tivoli 3	Thorad-SLV2H Agena-D	Reconnaissance		
OPS 7033	1970-04-08		Vela 11	Titan IIIC	Nuclear Detection		
OPS 7044	1970-04-08		Vela 12	Titan IIIC	Nuclear Detection		
OPS 2863	1970-04-15		KH-8 26	Titan-3B Agena-D	Reconnaissance		
OPS 4720	1970-05-20		KH-4B 10	Thorad-SLV2H Agena-D	Reconnaissance		
OPS 8520	1970-05-20		Tripos 4 / Sousea 3	Thorad-SLV2H Agena-D	Reconnaissance		
OPS 5346	1970-06-19		Rhyolite 1 (Aquacade 1)	Atlas-SLV3A Agena-D	Reconnaissance		
OPS 6820	1970-06-25		KH-8 27	Titan-3B Agena-D	Reconnaissance		
OPS 4324	1970-07-23		KH-4B 11	Thorad-SLV2H Agena-D	Reconnaissance		
OPS 7874	1970-08-18		KH-8 28	Titan-3B Agena-D	Reconnaissance		
OPS 8329	1970-08-26		Strawman 3	Thorad-SLV2G Agena-D	Reconnaissance		
OPS 7329	1970-09-01		Canyon 3	Atlas-SLV3A Agena-D	Reconnaissance		
OPS 0203	1970-09-03		DSAP-5A F2	Thor-LV2F Burner-2	Meteorology		
OPS 7568	1970-10-23		KH-8 29	Titan-3B Agena-D	Reconnaissance		
OPS 5960	1970-11-06		DSP-1	Titan-3(23)C	Early warning		
OPS 4992	1970-11-18		KH-4B 12	Thorad-SLV2H Agena-D	Reconnaissance		
OPS 6829	1970-11-18		Tophat 1	Thorad-SLV2H Agena-D	Reconnaissance		

== 1971-75 ==
Number	Launch date	COSPAR-ID	Other designations	Launch vehicle	Function	Status	Remarks
OPS 7776	1971-01-21		KH-8 30	Titan-3(23)B Agena-D	Reconnaissance		
OPS 5268	1971-02-17		DSAP-5A F3	Thor-LV2F Burner-2	Meteorology		
OPS 5268a	1971-02-17		NRL-PL 170A	Thor-LV2F Burner-2	Calibration		
OPS 5268b	1971-02-17		NRL-PL 170B	Thor-LV2F Burner-2	Calibration		
OPS 5268c	1971-02-17		NRL-PL 170C	Thor-LV2F Burner-2	Calibration		
OPS 3297	1971-02-17		KH-4B 13	Thorad-SLV2H Agena-D	Reconnaissance	Failure	
OPS 4788	1971-03-21		Jumpseat-1	Titan-3(33)B Agena-D	SIGINT		
OPS 5300	1971-03-24		KH-4B 14	Thorad-SLV2H Agena-D	Reconnaissance		
OPS 7899	1971-04-22		KH-8 31	Titan-3(23)B Agena-D	Reconnaissance		
OPS 3811	1971-05-05		DSP-2	Titan-3(23)C	Early warning		
OPS 3850	1971-06-08		SESP 1	Thor-LV2F Burner-2	Technology demonstration		
OPS 8709	1971-06-15		KH-9 1	Titan IIID	Reconnaissance		
OPS 8373	1971-07-16		Strawman 4	Thorad-SLV2H Agena-D	Reconnaissance		
OPS 8608	1971-08-12		KH-8 32	Titan-3(24)B Agena-D	Reconnaissance		
OPS 5454	1971-09-10		KH-4B 15	Thorad-SLV2H Agena-D	Reconnaissance		
OPS 7681	1971-09-10		Arroyo	Thorad-SLV2H Agena-D	Reconnaissance		
OPS 4311	1971-10-14		DSAP-5B F1	Thor-LV2F Burner-2A	Meteorology		
OPS 7616	1971-10-23		KH-8 33	Titan-3(24)B Agena-D	Reconnaissance		
OPS 9431	1971-11-03		DCSC-2 1	Titan-3(23)C	Communications		
OPS 9432	1971-11-03		DCSC-2 2	Titan-3(23)C	Communications		
OPS 7898	1971-12-14		Poppy 7A	Thorad-SLV2G Agena-D	ELINT		
OPS 7898b	1971-12-14		Poppy 7B	Thorad-SLV2G Agena-D	ELINT		
OPS 7898c	1971-12-14		Poppy 7C	Thorad-SLV2G Agena-D	ELINT		
OPS 7898d	1971-12-14		Poppy 7D	Thorad-SLV2G Agena-D	ELINT		
OPS 1737	1972-01-20		KH-9 2	Titan-IIID	Reconnaissance		
OPS 7718	1972-01-20		Mabeli	Titan-IIID	Reconnaissance		
OPS 1844	1972-02-16		Jumpseat-2	Titan-3(33)B Agena-D	SIGINT	Failure	
OPS 1570	1972-03-01		DSP-3	Titan-3(23)C	Early warning		
OPS 5058	1972-03-24		DSAP-5B F2 (DMSP-5B F2)	Thor-LV2F Burner-2A	Meteorology		
OPS 5640	1972-04-19		KH-4B 16	Thorad-SLV2H Agena-D	Reconnaissance		
OPS 6574	1972-05-20		KH-8 35	Titan-3(23)B Agena-D	Reconnaissance	Failure	
OPS 6371	1972-05-25		KH-4B 17	Thorad-SLV2H Agena-D	Reconnaissance		
OPS 7293	1972-07-07		KH-9 3	Titan-IIID	Reconnaissance		
OPS 7803	1972-07-07		Ursala 1	Titan-IIID	Reconnaissance		
OPS 8888	1972-09-01		KH-8 36	Titan-3(24)B Agena-D	Reconnaissance		
OPS 8180a	1972-10-02		Radsat	Atlas-F Burner-2	Reconnaissance		
OPS 8180b	1972-10-02		Radcat	Atlas-F Burner-2	Calibration		
OPS 8314	1972-10-10		KH-9 4	Titan-IIID	Reconnaissance		
OPS 8314/2	1972-10-10		P-801 4	Titan-IIID	Communications		
OPS 7323	1972-11-09		DSAP-5B F3	Thor-LV2F Burner-2A	Meteorology		
OPS 9390	1972-12-20		Canyon 5	Atlas-SLV3A Agena-D	Reconnaissance		
OPS 3978	1972-12-21		KH-8 37	Titan-3(24)B Agena-D	Reconnaissance		
OPS 6063	1973-03-06		Rhyolite 2 (Aquacade 2)	Atlas-SLV3A Agena-D	Reconnaissance		
OPS 8410	1973-03-09		KH-9 5	Titan-IIID	Reconnaissance		
OPS 2093	1973-05-16		KH-8 38	Titan-3(24)B Agena-D	Reconnaissance		
OPS 6157	1973-06-12		DSP-4	Titan-3(23)C	Early warning		
OPS 4018	1973-06-26		KH-8 39	Titan-3(24)B Agena-D	Reconnaissance	Failure	
OPS 8261	1973-07-13		KH-9 6	Titan-IIID	Reconnaissance		
OPS 8364	1973-08-17		DSAP-5B F4 (DMSP-5B F4)	Thor-LV2F Burner-2A	Meteorology		
OPS 7724	1973-08-21		Jumpseat-3	Titan-3(33)B Agena-D	Reconnaissance		
OPS 6275	1973-09-27		KH-8 40	Titan-3(24)B Agena-D	Reconnaissance		
OPS 6630	1973-11-10		KH-9 7	Titan-IIID	Reconnaissance		
OPS 7705	1973-11-10		Ursala 2	Titan-IIID	Reconnaissance		
OPS 6630/2	1973-11-10		P-801 5	Titan-IIID	Communications		
OPS 9433	1973-12-13		DSCS-2 3	Titan-3(23)B	Communications		
OPS 9434	1973-12-13		DSCS-2 4	Titan-3(23)B	Communications		
OPS 6889	1974-02-13		KH-8 41	Titan-3(24)B Agena-D	Reconnaissance		
OPS 8579	1974-03-16		DMSP-5B F5	Thor-LV2F Burner-2A	Meteorology		
OPS 6245	1974-04-10		KH-9 8	Titan IIID	Reconnaissance		
OPS 4547	1974-04-10		Tophat 2	Titan IIID	Reconnaissance		
OPS 3935	1974-04-10		IRCB	Titan IIID	Technology demonstration		
OPS 1776	1974-06-06		KH-8 42	Titan-3(24)B Agena-D	Reconnaissance		
OPS 7518	1974-07-14		NTS-1	Atlas-F PTS	Navigation		
OPS 6983	1974-08-09		DMSP-5C F1	Thor-LV2F Burner-2A	Navigation		
OPS 3004	1974-08-14		KH-8 43	Titan-3(24)B Agena-D	Reconnaissance		
OPS 7122	1974-09-29		KH-9 9	Titan IIID	Reconnaissance		
OPS 6239	1974-09-29		Raquel 1	Titan IIID	Reconnaissance		
OPS 8452	1974-09-29		S3 1	Titan IIID	Technology demonstration		
OPS 2439	1975-03-10		Jumpseat-4	Titan-3(34)B Agena-D	SIGINT		
OPS 4883	1975-04-18		KH-8 44	Titan-3(34)B Agena-D	Reconnaissance		
OPS 9435	1975-05-20		DCSC-2 5	Titan-3(23)C	Communications	Partial Failure	
OPS 9436	1975-05-20		DCSC-2 6	Titan-3(23)C	Communications	Partial Failure	
OPS 6226	1975-05-24		DMSP-5C F2	Thor-LV2F Burner-2A	Meteorology		
OPS 6381	1975-06-08		KH-9 10	Titan-3D	Reconnaissance		
OPS 4966	1975-06-18		Canyon-6	Atlas-SLV3A Agena-D	Reconnaissance		
OPS 5499	1975-10-09		KH-8 45	Titan-3(24)B Agena-D	Reconnaissance		
OPS 4428	1975-12-04		KH-9 11	Titan-IIID	Reconnaissance		
OPS 5547	1975-12-04		S3 2	Titan-IIID	Technology demonstration		
OPS 3165	1975-12-14		DSP-5	Titan-3(23)C	Early warning		

== 1976-80 ==
Number	Launch date	COSPAR-ID	Other designations	Launch vehicle	Function	Status	Remarks
OPS 5140	1976-02-19		DMSP-5C F3	Thor-LV2F Burner-2A	Meteorology		
OPS 7837	1976-06-02		Quasar-1	Titan-3(34)B Agena-D	Communications		
OPS 2112	1974-06-26		DSP-6	Titan-3(23)C	Early warning		
OPS 4699	1976-07-08		KH-9 12	Titan-IIID	Reconnaissance		
OPS 5366	1976-07-08		Ursala 3	Titan-IIID	Reconnaissance		
OPS 3986	1976-07-08		S3 3	Titan-IIID	Technology demonstration		
OPS 7940	1976-08-06		Quasar-2	Titan-3(34)B Agena-D	Communications		
OPS 5721	1976-09-11		DMSP-5D1 F1	Thor-LV2F Star-37XE Star-37-S-ISS	Meteorology		
OPS 8533	1976-09-15		KH-8 47	Titan-3(24)B Agena-D	Reconnaissance		
OPS 8410	1976-12-19		KH-11 1	Titan-IIID	Reconnaissance		
OPS 3151	1977-02-06		DSP-7	Titan-3(23)C	Early warning		
OPS 4915	1977-03-13		KH-8 48	Titan-3(24)B Agena-D	Reconnaissance		
OPS 9437	1977-05-12		DSCS-2 7	Titan-3(23)C	Communications		
OPS 9428	1977-05-12		DSCS-2 8	Titan-3(23)C	Communications		
OPS 9751	1977-05-23		Canyon-7	Atlas-SLV3A Agena-D	Reconnaissance		
OPS 5644	1977-06-05		DMSP-5D1 F2	Thor-LV2F Star-37XE Star-37-S-ISS	Meteorology		
OPS 4800	1977-06-27		KH-9 13	Titan-IIID	Reconnaissance		
OPS 7471	1977-09-23		KH-8 49	Titan-3(34)B Agena-D	Reconnaissance		
OPS 4258	1977-12-11		Aquacade 3	Atlas-SLV3A Agena-D	Reconnaissance		
OPS 6291	1978-02-09		FLTSATCOM-1	Atlas-SLV3D Centaur-D1AR	Communications		
OPS 5111	1978-02-22		GPS-1	Atlas-F SGS-1	Navigation		
OPS 6031	1978-02-25		Jumpseat-5	Titan-3(34)B Agena-D	SIGINT		
OPS 0460	1978-03-16		KH-9 14	Titan-IIID	Reconnaissance		
OPS 7858	1978-03-16		Raquel 1A	Titan-IIID	Reconnaissance		
OPS 9439	1978-03-25		DSCS-2 9	Titan-3(23)C	Communications	Failure	
OPS 9440	1978-03-25		DSCS-2 10	Titan-3(23)C	Communications	Failure	
OPS 8730	1978-04-07		Aquacade 4	Atlas-SLV3A Agena-D	Reconnaissance		
OPS 6182	1978-05-01		DMSP-5D1 F3	Thor-LV2F Star-37XE Star-37S-ISS	Meteorology		
OPS 5112	1978-05-13		GPS-2	Atlas-F SGS-1	Navigation		
OPS 9454	1978-06-10		Chalet 8 (Vortex 8)	Titan-3(23)C	Reconnaissance		
OPS 4515	1978-06-14		KH-11 2	Titan-IIID	Reconnaissance		
OPS 7310	1978-08-05		Quasar-3	Titan-3(34)B Agena-D	Communications		
OPS 5113	1978-10-07		GPS-3	Atlas-F SGS-1	Navigation		
OPS 5114	1978-12-11		GPS-4	Atlas-F SGS-1	Navigation		
OPS 3854	1979-03-16		KH-9 15	Titan-IIID	Reconnaissance		
OPS 6675	1979-03-16		Ursala 4	Titan-IIID	Reconnaissance		
OPS 6292	1979-05-04		FLTSATCOM-2	Atlas-SLV3D Centaur-D1AR	Communications		
OPS 7164	1979-05-28		KH-8 50	Titan-3(24)B Agena-D	Reconnaissance		
OPS 5390	1979-06-06		DMSP-5D1 F4	Thor-LV2F Star-37XE Star-37S-ISS	Meteorology		
OPS 7484	1979-06-10		DSP-8	Titan-3(23)C	Early warning		
OPS 1948	1979-10-01		Vortex 9	Titan-3(23)C	Reconnaissance		
OPS 9441	1979-11-21		DSCS-2 13	Titan-3(23)C	Communications		
OPS 9442	1979-11-21		DSCS-2 14	Titan-3(23)C	Communications		
OPS 6293	1980-01-18		FLTSATCOM-3	Atlas-SLV3D Centaur-D1AR	Communications		
OPS 2581	1980-02-07		KH-11 3	Titan IIID	Reconnaissance		
OPS 5115	1980-02-09		GPS-5	Atlas-F SGS-1	Navigation		
OPS 5116	1980-04-26		GPS-6	Atlas-F SGS-1	Navigation		
OPS 3123	1980-06-18		KH-9 16	Titan-IIID	Reconnaissance		
OPS 1292	1980-06-18		P-801 6	Titan-IIID	Communications		
OPS 6294	1980-10-31		FLTSATCOM-4	Atlas-SLV3D Centaur-D1AR	Communications		
OPS 5805	1980-12-13		Quasar-4	Titan-3(34)B Agena-D	Communications		

== 1981-84 ==
Number	Launch date	COSPAR-ID	Other designations	Launch vehicle	Function	Status	Remarks
OPS 1166	1981-02-28		KH-8 51	Titan-3(24)B Agena-D	Reconnaissance		
OPS 7350	1981-03-16		DSP-9	Titan-2(23)C	Early warning		
OPS 7225	1981-04-24		Jumpseat-6	Titan-3(34)B Agena-D	SIGINT	Partial Failure	
OPS 3984	1981-09-03		KH-11 4	Titan-IIID	Reconnaissance		
OPS 4029	1981-10-31		Vortex-10 (Mercury-10)	Titan-3(23)C	Reconnaissance		
OPS 2849	1982-01-21		KH-8 52	Titan-3(24)B Agena-D	Reconnaissance		
OPS 8701	1982-03-06		DSP-10	Titan-3(23)C	Early warning		
OPS 5642	1982-05-11		KH-9 17	Titan-IIID	Reconnaissance		
OPS 6553	1982-05-11		Farrah-1	Titan-IIID	Reconnaissance		
OPS 9445	1982-10-30		DSCS-2 16	Titan-34D IUS	Communications		
OPS 9627	1982-11-17		KH-11 5	Titan-3D	Reconnaissance		
OPS 9845	1982-12-21		DMSP-5D2 F6	Atlas-E Star-37S-ISS	Meteorology		
OPS 2925	1983-04-15		KH-8 53	Titan-3(24)B Agena-D	Reconnaissance		
OPS 0721	1983-06-20		KH-9 18	Titan-34D	Reconnaissance		
OPS 3899	1983-06-20		P-801 7	Titan-34D	Communications		
OPS 9794	1983-07-14		GPS-8	Atlas-E SGS-2	Navigation		
OPS 7304	1983-07-31		Jumpseat-7	Titan-3(34)B Agena-D	SIGINT		
OPS 1294	1983-11-18		DMSP-5D2 F7	Atlas-E Star-37S-ISS	Meteorology		
OPS 0441	1984-01-31		Vortex-11 (Mercury-11)	Titan-34D Transtage	Reconnaissance		
OPS 7641	1984-04-14		DSP-11	Titan-34D Transtage	Early warning		
OPS 8424	1984-04-17		KH-8 54	Titan-3(24)B Agena-D	Reconnaissance		

== See also ==
- List of USA satellites (1-500)
