= OV5-1 =

US Air Force satellite

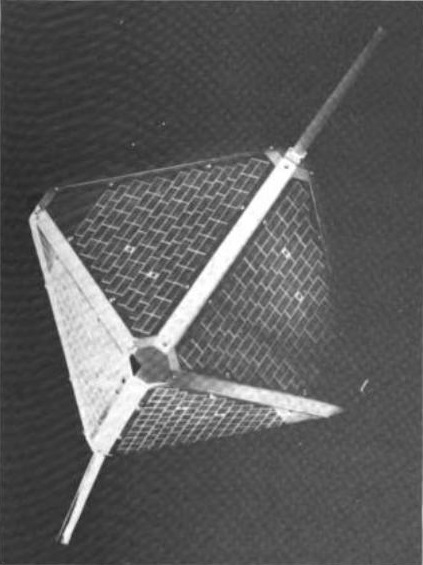
- OV5-1
- Mission type: Earth science
- Operator: USAF
- COSPAR ID: 1967-040E
- SATCAT no.: S02769

Spacecraft properties
- Manufacturer: TRW Inc.
- Launch mass: 6.3 kg (14 lb)

Start of mission
- Launch date: 28 Apr 1967 10:01:00 UTC
- Rocket: Titan IIIC
- Launch site: Cape Canaveral LC-41

Orbital parameters
- Reference system: Geocentric
- Regime: Highly Elliptical
- Perigee altitude: 9,484 km (5,893 mi)
- Apogee altitude: 110,350 km (68,570 mi)
- Period: 47.2 hours
- Epoch: 28 Apr 1967

Orbiting Vehicle 5-1 (also known as OV5-1 and ERS 27), was an X-ray measuring microsatellite launched in support of the United States Air Force's space weather prediction program. Launched on 28 April 1967, it was the first satellite in the OV5 series of the United States Air Force's Orbiting Vehicle program. Data was collected until November 1967, and the satellite turned itself off in June 1967. OV5-1 is still in orbit as of 11 February 2023.

== Background ==
The Orbiting Vehicle satellite program arose from a US Air Force initiative, begun in the early 1960s, to reduce the expense of space research. Through this initiative, satellites would be standardized to improve reliability and cost-efficiency, and where possible, they would fly on test vehicles or be piggybacked with other satellites. In 1961, the Air Force Office of Aerospace Research (OAR) created the Aerospace Research Support Program (ARSP) to request satellite research proposals and choose mission experiments. The USAF Space and Missiles Organization created their own analog of the ARSP called the Space Experiments Support Program (SESP), which sponsored a greater proportion of technological experiments than the ARSP. Five distinct OV series of standardized satellites were developed under the auspices of these agencies.

The OV5 program was a continuation of the Environmental Research Satellite (ERS) series developed by Space Technology Laboratories, a subdivision of TRW Inc. These were very small satellites launched pick-a-back with primary payloads since 1962—a natural fit under the Orbiting Vehicle umbrella. The primary innovation over the earlier ERS series was a command receiver, allowing instructions to be sent from the ground, and a Pulse-code modulation digital telemetry system, versus the analog transmitters used on prior ERS missions. Like prior ERS, the OV5s were spin-stabilized and heat was passively controlled. All of the OV5 series were built by TRW with the exception of OV5-6, built by AFCRL, and OV5-9, built by Northrop Corporation.

With data received OV5-1, the first satellite in the OV5 series, AFCRL hoped to be able to predict the effects of solar activity on the space environment far above the Earth, particularly the strength of hazardous solar protons. The satellite project manager was Major Ronald A. Bena, chief of the Space Forecasting Branch at AFCRL. Dr. G. Kenneth Yates was the project scientist.

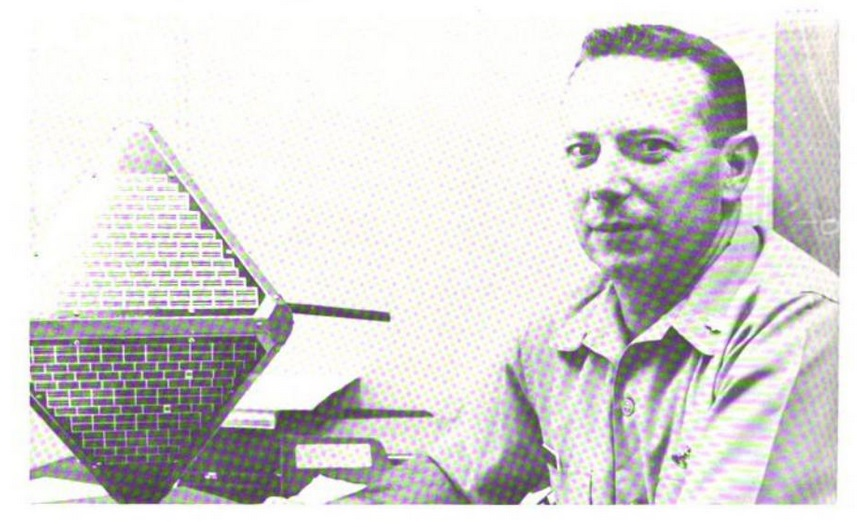
Major Ronald A. Bena, project manager for OV5

== Spacecraft design ==
The OV5 satellites resembled their ERS predecessors. OV5-1 was made of aluminum struts outlining a tetrahedron .3 m (0.98 ft) in width, with 816 solar cells generating 5.5 Watts distributed over the eight triangular faces. The bottom vertex housed the fitting that attached to the launch vehicle; the other vertices were used for mounting experiments. Power was stored in a nickel–cadmium battery. An on-board timer was designed to shut off the satellite after 18 months of operation.

== Experiments ==
The primary experiment on OV5-1 was a proportional counter with a beryllium window for the measurement of X-rays from solar flares. Six directional geiger counters also measured X-rays. The proportional counter also measured background radiation during non-flare periods. A solar aspect sensor system, determining the angle between the satellite-sun line and the satellite spin axis to within 7.5 degrees, ensured that project scientists could properly interpret satellite data.

== Mission ==
OV5-1 was launched via Titan IIIC rocket on 28 Apr 1967 at 10:01 UTC from Cape Canaveral LC-41, mounted pick-a-back with Vela 4A and Vela 4B. These three satellites, along with OV5-3 and ERS 18, were placed in a highly elliptical orbit that took them more than 110,000 km (68,000 mi) above the Earth. There, OV5-1 was spun up to 12 rpm and oriented so its X-ray detector swept past the Sun. Measurements were transmitted to the AFCRL facility at Sagamore Hill Radio Observatory as well as NASA Spacecraft Tracking and Data Acquisition Network stations for six hours out of every 47.2 hour orbit.

Data was collected from the satellite until 1 November 1967. OV5-1's preset timer turned off the transmitter in June 1968.

== Legacy and status ==
OV5-1 data was compiled between 15 January 1968 and 15 June 1971 into a final report. It included analysis of measurements taken within and above Earth's magnetosphere as well as X-rays resulting from the 23 May 1967 solar flare. OV5-1 is still in orbit as of 11 February 2023. There were seven orbited satellites in the OV5 series launched between 1967 and 1969, six of them successful.
