= OV5-3 =

US Air Force satellite

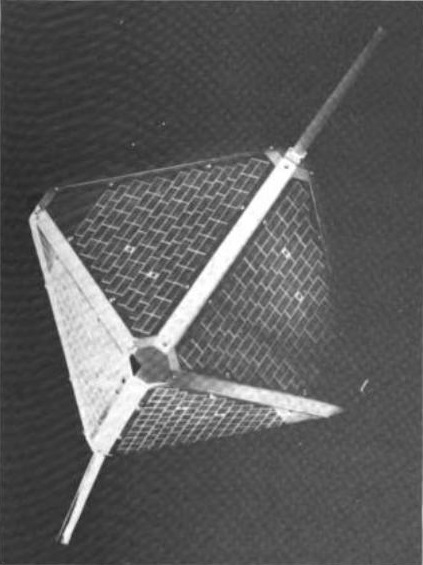
- OV5-1 (a typical OV5 satellite)
- Mission type: Materials science
- Operator: USAF
- COSPAR ID: 1967-040D
- SATCAT no.: S02768

Spacecraft properties
- Manufacturer: TRW Inc.
- Launch mass: 8.6 kg (19 lb)

Start of mission
- Launch date: 28 Apr 1967 10:01:00 UTC
- Rocket: Titan IIIC
- Launch site: Cape Canaveral LC-41

Orbital parameters
- Reference system: Geocentric
- Regime: Highly Elliptical
- Eccentricity: 0.744
- Perigee altitude: 86,044 km (53,465 mi)
- Apogee altitude: 111,229 km (69,114 mi)
- Inclination: 32.8
- Period: 2829.6 minutes<
- Epoch: 1 May 1967

Orbiting Vehicle 5-3 (also known as OV5-3 and ERS 20), was a materials science microsatellite launched on 28 April 1967 and still in orbit as of 2020. Carrying a variety of metal and plastic samples, it conducted friction tests on them in the vacuum of space to help determine their usability in space equipment. OV5-3 was the second satellite in the OV5 series of the United States Air Force's Orbiting Vehicle program.

== Background ==
The Orbiting Vehicle satellite program arose from a US Air Force initiative, begun in the early 1960s, to reduce the expense of space research. Through this initiative, satellites would be standardized to improve reliability and cost-efficiency, and where possible, they would fly on test vehicles or be piggybacked with other satellites. In 1961, the Air Force Office of Aerospace Research (OAR) created the Aerospace Research Support Program (ARSP) to request satellite research proposals and choose mission experiments. The USAF Space and Missiles Organization created their own analog of the ARSP called the Space Experiments Support Program (SESP), which sponsored a greater proportion of technological experiments than the ARSP. Five distinct OV series of standardized satellites were developed under the auspices of these agencies.

The OV5 program was a continuation of the Environmental Research Satellite (ERS) series developed by Space Technology Laboratories, a subdivision of TRW Inc. These were very small satellites launched pick-a-back with primary payloads since 1962—a natural fit under the Orbiting Vehicle umbrella. The primary innovation over the earlier ERS series was a command receiver, allowing instructions to be sent from the ground, and a Pulse-code modulation digital telemetry system, versus the analog transmitters used on prior ERS missions. Like prior ERS, the OV5s were spin-stabilized and heat was passively controlled. All of the OV5 series were built by TRW with the exception of OV5-6, built by AFCRL, and OV5-9, built by Northrop Corporation.

In contrast to the space environmental missions of most of the other OV probes, including OV5-3's rocket-mate, OV5-1, OV5-3 carried an engineering experiment. With a cargo of 16 samples of metals and Teflon, each of these materials was tested for friction for use in future spacecraft systems.

== Spacecraft design ==
The OV5 satellites resembled their ERS predecessors. OV5-3 was made of aluminum struts outlining a tetrahedron .3 m (0.98 ft) in width, with 816 solar cells generating 5.5 Watts distributed over the eight triangular faces. The bottom vertex housed the fitting that attached to the launch vehicle; the other vertices were used for mounting experiments. Power was stored in a nickel–cadmium battery. An on-board timer was designed to shut off the satellite after 18 months of operation.

OV5-3 had no attitude control or propulsion system, but it set spinning by a coiled spring system upon ejection from the launch vehicle for more even solar cell activation and for improved communications reliability. Passive thermal control kept the inside of the spacecraft at around 15 °C (59 °F). Telemetry broadcast on 136.260 MHz while the command receiver transmitted at 149 MHz. These frequencies were compatible with NASA Spacecraft Tracking and Data Acquisition Network (STADAN) stations.

== Experiments ==
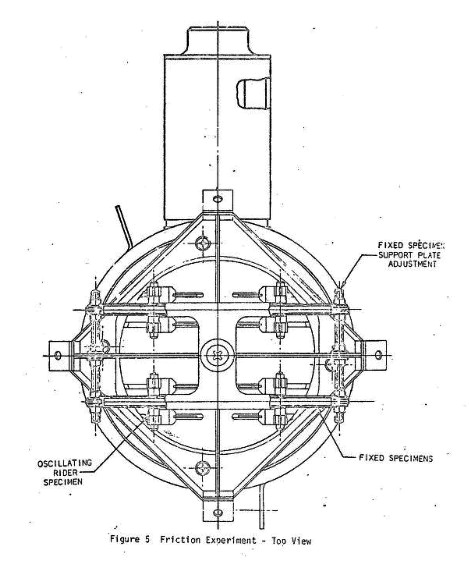
OV5-3 materials science experiment top view

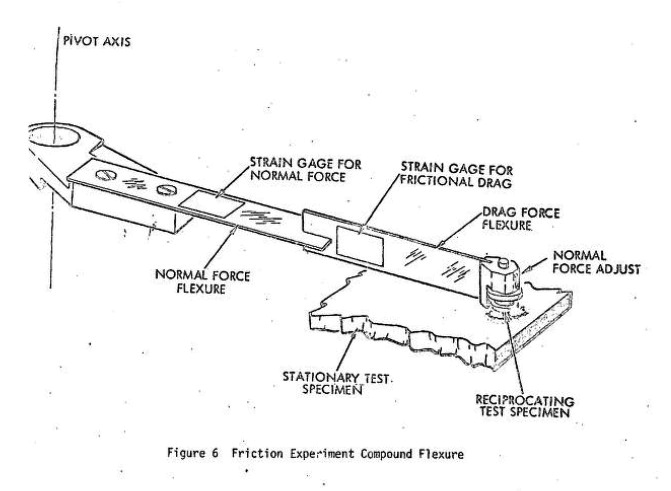
OV5-3 materials science experiment wiper view

Two identical experiment packages were mounted outside the satellite on opposite vertices, each with 16 samples of metal and Teflon. They included a sealed electric motor, which drove a cam linked through a flexible bellows. These in turn were attached to sixteen wiper arms that slid across the samples while the satellite was in communication with a STADAN station, and only on the command of a ground controller. This minimized wear on the samples as well as gave more flexibility to the tester.

== Mission ==
OV5-3 was launched via Titan IIIC rocket on 28 Apr 1967 at 10:01 UTC from Cape Canaveral LC-41, mounted pick-a-back with Vela 4A and Vela 4B. These three satellites, along with OV5-1 and ERS 18, were placed in a highly elliptical orbit that took them more than 110,000 km (68,000 mi) above the Earth. Friction tests began 48 hours after orbital insertion and continued for twelve months (but only when the satellite was within 50,000 km (31,000 mi)} of a STADAN station.

== Legacy and status ==
These results were compared to friction tests conducted in vacuum on the ground, produced by two different methods, over the next several years. Extended ion pumped data correlated more closely to OV5-3 data than data obtained from oil pumped ultrahigh vacuum tests.

Though the satellite was supposed to turn itself off after one year, OV5-3 was still transmitting on 136.260 MHz as of 2020. There were seven orbited satellites in the OV5 series launched between 1967 and 1969, six of them successful.
