= Environmental Research Satellite =

Family of artificial satellites launched in the 1960s run by the USAF

The Environmental Research Satellite (ERS, alternatively Earth Resources Satellite) program was a series of small satellites initially operated by the United States Air Force Office of Aerospace Research. Designed to be launched "piggyback" to other satellites during launch, detaching once in orbit, they were the smallest satellites launched to date—what would today be classified as microsatellites. Thirty-three ERS satellites in six different series were launched between 1962 and 1971, conducting scientific research and serving as test beds to investigate the reliability of new spacecraft components.

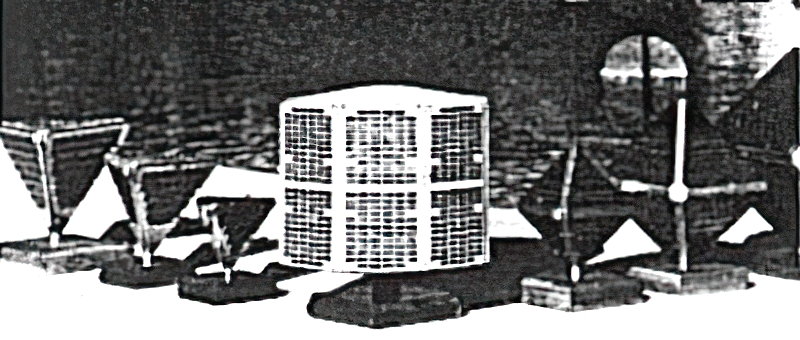
The TRS and ORS families. From left to right: TRS Mk. 3, TRS Mk. 2, TRS Mk.1, an OV3 bus, ORS Mk. 1, ORS Mk. 2, ORS Mk. 3

== Summary of launches ==
Series	First launch	Last launch	Built	Confirmed launched	Failed
TRS Mk. 1	1962-09-07	1963-07-19	10	10	7
TRS Mk. 2	1963-10-17	1964-10-7	4	2	0
ORS Mk.2	1966-06-19	1966-08-09	5	2	0
ORS Mk.3	1965-07-20	1967-04-28	2	2	0
OV5	1967-04-28	1969-05-23	9	8	1
TTS, TETR, TATS	1967-12-13	1971-09-29	4	4	3

== TRS Mk. 1 ==
The TRS (Tetrahedral Research Satellite) Mk. 1 was developed by Space Technology Laboratories, a subdivision of TRW Inc., as an inexpensive, miniaturized "off-the-shelf" satellite that customers could use to perform simple experiments in orbit. The Mk. 1 was a regular tetrahedron measuring 16 cm (6.3 in) on a side, each face mounted with sufficient solar cells to operate the experiments and the telemetry system when the satellite was in the sun. Transmission of data was constant at that time as the spacecraft included neither internal battery nor command system. A transistor-based system provided eight channels of data: five for experiments, two for telemetry calibration, and one for the spacecraft temperature. A 40 in (1.0 m) antenna transmitted data. on 136.771 Mhz.

Each TRS satellite was estimated to cost only $25,000 (equivalent to $213,888.89 in 2020) to build, excluding development, launch and mission operations costs.

The Air Force Space Systems Division (AFSSD), then headed by Col. T. O. Wear, was the first and only customer for STL's TRS Mk. 1 satellites, initially purchasing six for its Environmental Research Satellite (ERS) program. Ten TRS Mk. 1 satellites were ultimately produced, designed to research radiation and micrometeoroid flux in Earth orbit. All were launched from Vandenberg Air Force Base attached to primary payloads.

Name	Mass	COSPAR ID	Launch	Reentry	Primary satellites	Mission	Outcome
ERS 1	.7 kg (1.5 lb)	1962 βπ	1962-11-11	1962-11-12	Samos 11 (Samos-E6 5)	Radiation studies	Failed to separate
ERS 2 (TRS 1)	.6 kg (1.3 lb)	1962 αχ	1962-09-17	1962-10-17	KH-4 12	Radiation, natural and from Starfish Prime	Failed to separate
ERS 3		1962-F09	1962-12-17		MIDAS 6, ERS 4	Radiation and micrometeorite studies; carried a cosmic ray experiment and an infrared plume experiment	Failed to launch
ERS 4		1962-F09	1962-12-17		MIDAS 6, ERS 3	Radiation and micrometeorite studies; carried a cosmic ray experiment and an infrared plume experiment	Failed to launch
ERS 5 (TRS 2)	.7 kg (1.5 lb)	1963-014B	1963-09-05	1963-11-11	MIDAS 7, DASH 1, West Ford 2, ERS 6	Van Allen Belts radiation and radiation damage to solar cells	Successful
ERS 6 (TRS 3)	.7 kg (1.5 lb)	1963-014C	1963-09-05	1964-03-17	MIDAS 7, DASH 1, West Ford 2, ERS 5	Van Allen Belts radiation and radiation damage to solar cells	Successful
ERS 7		1963-F09	1963-06-12		MIDAS 8, TRS 8	Radiation and micrometeorite studies	Failed to launch
ERS 8		1963-F09	1963-06-12		MIDAS 8, TRS 7	Radiation and micrometeorite studies	Failed to launch
ERS 9 (TRS 4)	1.5 kg (3.3 lb)	1963-030B	1963-07-19	1963-08-11	MIDAS 9, DASH 2, ERS 10	Radiation damage to solar cells	Successful
ERS 10	1.5 kg (3.3 lb)	1963-030A	1963-07-19	1964-09-24	MIDAS 9, DASH 2, ERS 09	Radiation damage to solar cells	Failed to separate

=== Significant flights ===
==== ERS 2 (TRS 1) ====
At the time it was launched, TRS 1 was the smallest satellite ever placed into orbit. The aluminum spacecraft carried 140 solar cells, producing 600 milliwatts of power, and five radiation-detecting cells. Though the satellite did not separate from its primary satellite, it returned eight minutes of data per orbit to tracking stations below. It was designed to turn off after 90 days of operation. TRS 1 circled the Earth in a Low Earth orbit.

==== ERS 5, 6, and 9 (TRS 2-4) ====
Data returned from these three fully successful TRS satellites, circling the Earth in Medium Earth orbits (within the Van Allen Belts), returned valuable data on the effects of orbital radiation on solar cells. Of significance, it was determined that p-on-n silicon cells deteriorated five times more quickly than n-on-p cells. While protective covers did not affect n-on-p degradation, they were shown to be helpful for the more sensitive p-on-n cells. An unexpected result of the solar cell experiment was that, while it had been observed in ground tests that exposure to radiation of the cells' quartz covers and the epoxy adhesive that held them to the cells reduced the light they transmitted (and thus the power generated) to the cells by 15%, such was not observed in orbit.

TRS 2 and 3 marked the first time two satellites were deployed into orbit simultaneously. Data was obtained by NASA's Minitrack communications network in cooperation with the USAF.

== TRS Mk. 2 ==
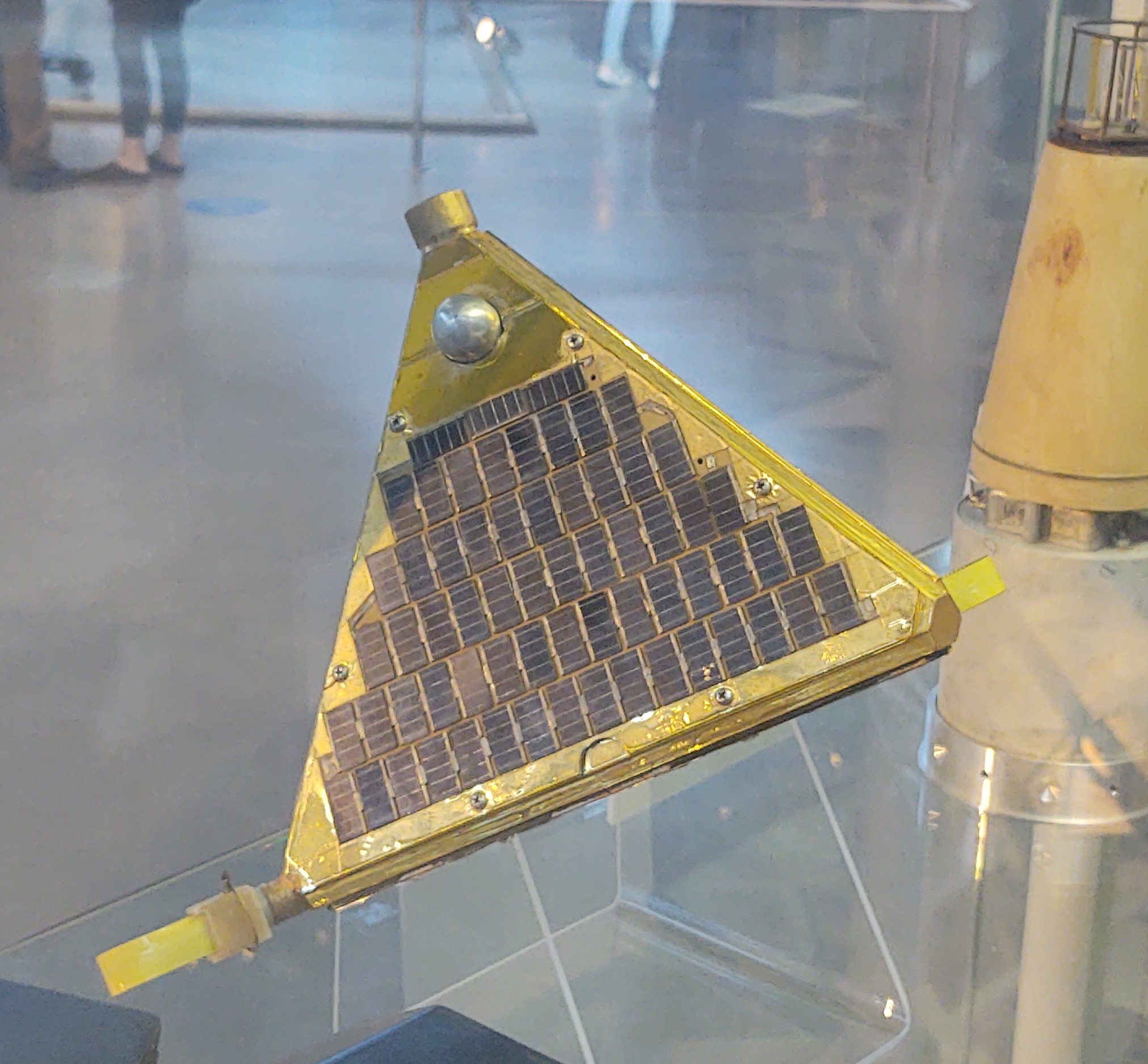
ERS-11, an unflown TRS Mk. 2 prototype, on display at the Steven F. Udvar-Hazy Center

The TRS Mk. 2 design was a tetrahedron measuring 21 cm on a side. Four were produced: ERS-11 through ERS-14, though only two were launched, both pick-a-back with primary USAF payloads. They were designed to operate for one year, at which point, an onboard timer would shut the satellites off.

Name	Mass	COSPAR ID	Launch	Reentry	Primary satellites	Mission	Outcome
ERS 11	2.1 kg (4.6 lb)					Prototype satellite	Not launched
ERS 12 (TRS 5)	2.1 kg (4.6 lb)	1963-039B	1963-10-17		Vela 1A, Vela 1B	Charged particle research in the magnetosphere	Successful
ERS 13 (TRS 6)	2.1 kg (4.6 lb)	1964-040C	1964-07-17		Vela 2A, Vela 2B	Charged particle research in the magnetosphere	Successful
ERS 14							Not launched

=== Flights ===
==== ERS 12 (TRS 5) ====
Launched into a highly elliptical orbit that took the satellite as high as 103,500 km (64,300 mi) above the Earth and as close as 220 km (140 mi) at perigee, ERS 12 measured the intensity of charged particles in the magnetosphere. Its experiment package detected radiation from all directions, measuring electrons at levels greater than 0.5 and 5 MeV and protons between 10 and 20 eV and 50 to 100 eV. The spacecraft returned data until 1963-10-30.

==== ERS 13 (TRS 6, "Pygmy") ====
ERS 13's orbit was similar to that of ERS 12, with a perigee of 250 km (160 mi), but an even higher apogee: 120,317 km (74,762 mi). Spinning once every six seconds, the satellite measured electron and proton levels in the Van Allen Belts with omni-directional radiation detectors—a scintillation counter and a solid-state detector.^{[a]} The onboard transmitter, with a power of 100 mW could only reach ground stations when ERS 13 was within 40,280 km (25,030 mi) of Earth. The satellite functioned normally until 1964-10-20, when transmission became erratic. The satellite went silent on 1965-01-25.

^{a} (it is possible that ERS 12 and ERS 13 had the same experiments in their packages)

== ORS Mk. 1 ==
There is no evidence that any Octahedral Research Satellite Mark 1 ever flew.

== ORS Mk. 2 ==
The ORS Mk. 2 design was an octahedron measuring 23 cm on a side. Five were produced: ORS-1 and ORS-2 (ERS-15 through ERS-16), which carried out cold welding experiments in space on a variety of metal samples, and ERS-23 through ERS-25, classified satellites whose flights may have been cancelled.

Both ERS 15 and 16 used actuators for their cold welding experiments, the first (16) making five metal to metal tests, and the second (15) making eight.

Name	Mass	COSPAR ID	Launch	Reentry	Primary satellites	Mission	Outcome
ERS 15 (ORS 1)	4.5 kg (9.9 lb)	1966-077C	1966-08-19		Midas 10, SECOR 7	Cold welding	Successful
ERS 16 (ORS 2)	4.5 kg (9.9 lb)	1966-051C	1966-06-09	1967-03-12	Midas 11, SECOR 6	Cold welding	Successful
ERS 23							Mission cancelled
ERS 24							Mission cancelled
ERS 25							Mission cancelled

== ORS Mk. 3 ==
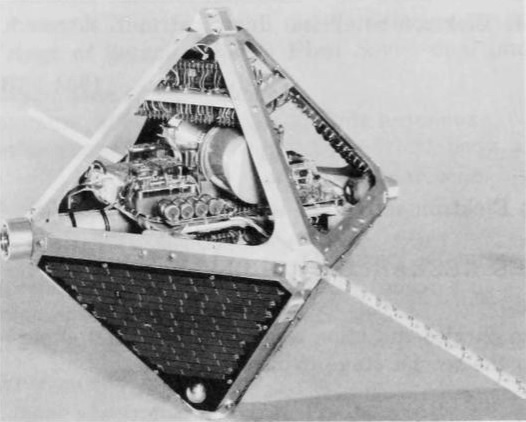
ERS-17, an ORS Mk. 3 satellite

The ORS Mk. 3 design was an octahedron measuring 28 cm on a side. Two were produced: ORS-3 and ORS-4 (ERS-17 and ERS-18).

Name	Mass	COSPAR ID	Launch	Reentry	Primary satellite	Mission	Outcome
ERS 17 (ORS 3)	5.5 kg (12 lb)	1965-058C	1965-7-20	1968-07-01	Vela 5, Vela 6	Radiation detection	Successful
ERS 18 (ORS 4)	9.1 kg (20 lb)	1967-040C	1967-04-28		Vela 7, Vela 7, OV5-1, OV5-3	Gamma ray and X ray observation	Successful

=== Flights ===
==== ERS 17 (ORS 3) ====
Taking advantage of the high-apogee, eccentric orbit of the Vela 3A and Vela 3B satellites, ERS 17 was attached as a "pigmy" satellite, adding negligibly to the payload compared to the Velas launched 20 July 1965 to monitor the Earth for nuclear tests. ERS 17's 112,012 km (69,601 mi) apogee and 207 km (129 mi) perigee orbit took it through Earth's Van Allen Belts, which the satellite was designed to investigate, measuring charged particles, X rays, gamma rays, and cosmic rays in the near-earth environment. Approximately 1500 hours of data were collected by the ERS 17's five radiation detectors until November 3, 1965, when the transmitter ceased. Though this was much shorter than the planned lifespan of one year, the satellite had collected a useful data set within the first four weeks of operation. In addition to returning basic scientific data, as well as helping to refine the Vela design by a better understanding of the radiation hazard the satellite series would endure, ERS 17 also monitored for the telltale increase of electron fluxes in the event of nuclear detonations in near space. ERS reentered 1 July 1967.

==== ERS 18 (ORS 4) ====
The heavier ERS 18, launched with the next set of Vela satellites with the same mission as ERS 17, operated successfully from launch until thirteen months later, on June 3, 1968, when its transmitter was turned off by the onboard timer, as planned. Analysis of returned data indicated that the intensity of gamma rays of energy greater than 1 MeV were higher than would be expected by simply extrapolating from the intensity of gamma rays of less than 1 MeV energy. This suggested an additional, as yet undetermined source of high intensity gamma rays.

As of 8 June 2022, ERS 18 is still in orbit, and its position can be tracked on-line.

== OV5 ==
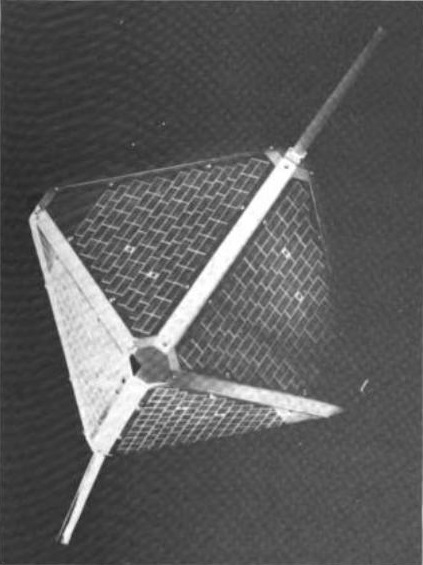
OV5-1 satellite

The design of the OV5 (Orbiting Vehicle 5) series was based on the ORS Mk. 3 design and its vehicles were also given ERS numbers. Nine were produced: OV5-1 through OV5-9. These were very small satellites launched pick-a-back with primary payloads since 1962—a natural fit under the Orbiting Vehicle umbrella. The primary innovation over the earlier ERS series was a command receiver, allowing instructions to be sent from the ground, and a Pulse-code modulation digital telemetry system, versus the analog transmitters used on prior ERS missions. Like prior ERS, the OV5s were spin-stabilized and heat was passively controlled. All of the OV5 series were built by TRW with the exception of OV5-6, built by AFCRL, and OV5-9, built by Northrop Corporation.

OV5 Missions

Name	Mass	COSPAR ID	Launch	Reentry	Primary satellites	Mission	Outcome
OV5-1 (ERS-27)	6 kg (13 lb)	1967 040E	28 Apr 1967			Materials sciences research	Successful
OV5-2 (ERS-28)	10 kg (22 lb)	1968 081B	26 Sep 1968	15 Feb 1971		Radiation studies	Successful
OV5-3 (ERS-20)	8.6 kg (19 lb)	1967 040D	28 Apr 1967			Radiation studies	Successful
OV5-4 (ERS-21)	12 kg (26 lb)	1968 081C	26 Sep 1968			Heat transfer studies	Successful
OV5-5 (ERS-29)	11 kg (24 lb)	1969 046A	23-May-1969			Radiation studies	Successful
OV5-6 (ERS-26)	11 kg (24 lb)	1969 046B	23-May-1969			Solar flare studies	Successful
OV5-7						Solar studies	Cancelled
OV5-8	9 kg (20 lb)		16 Aug 1968			Materials sciences research – materials friction experiment	Failed to orbit
OV5-9	13 kg (29 lb)	1969 046C	23 May 1969			Radiation studies – carried low-energy proton detectors, a dE/dx telescope, a Cerenkov counter, a VLF radiation detector, a solar X-ray monitor and a solar flare electron detector to provide further basic research data on solar radiation and its effects on the magnetosphere	Successful

== TETR ==
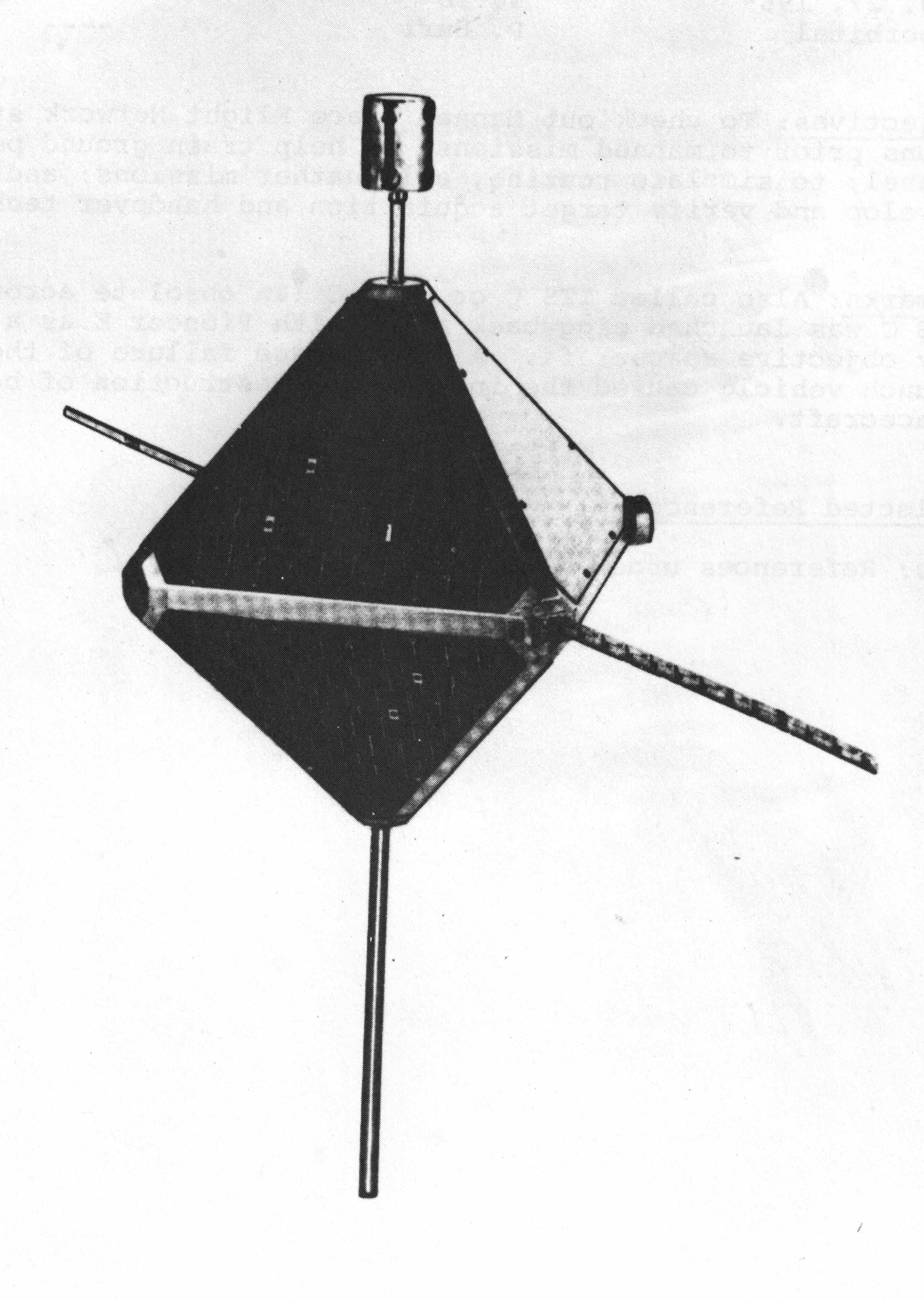
Test and Training Satellite (TTS)

TETR (also known as TTR and TATS, all standing for "Test and Training Satellite") was a series of octahedral ERS satellites which were built to train Apollo program ground station crews for the Manned Space Flight Network. Four were produced: TTR-1 through TTR-4 (ERS-30 through ERS-33) TETR 2 supported training for Apollo missions 8 through 13 despite a faulty battery pack. TETR C failed to orbit due to a failure in the launch vehicle.

Name	Mass	COSPAR ID	Launch	Reentry	Primary satellite	Mission	Outcome
ERS 30 (TTS 1, TETR 1)	20 kg (44 lb)	1967-123B	1967-12-13	1968-04-28	Pioneer 8	Communications	Successful
ERS 31 (TTS 2, TETR 2)	40 kg (88 lb)	1968-100B	1968-11-08	1979-09-19	Pioneer 9	Communications	Successful
ERS 32 (TTS 3, TETR 3)		TETR-C	1969-08-27		Pioneer E	Communications	Launch failure
ERS 33 (TTS 4, TETR 4)	20.4 kg (45 lb)	1971-083B	1971-09-29	1978-09-19	OSO 7	Communications	Successful
