= 54 Piscium Ab =

Saturn like exoplanet orbiting 54 Piscium A

54 Piscium b
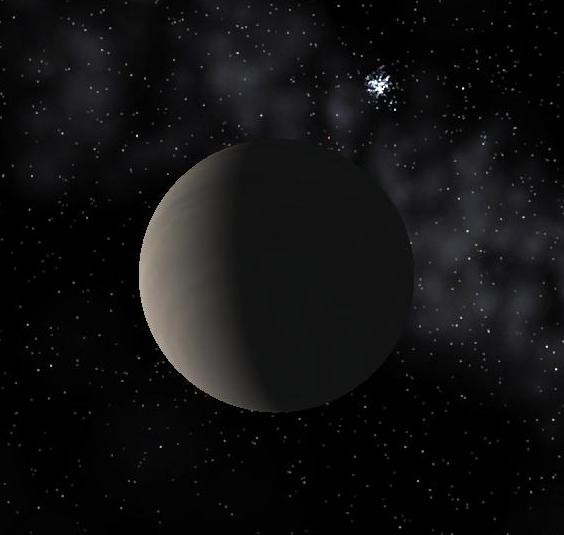

Discovery
- Discovered by: Fischer et al.
- Discovery site: Lick Observatory and Keck Observatory
- Discovery date: 2003
- Detection method: Doppler spectroscopy

Orbital characteristics
- Semi-major axis: 0.295±0.029 AU
- Eccentricity: 0.645±0.02
- Orbital period (sidereal): 62.250±0.004 d
- Argument of perihelion: 243±3 º
- Semi-amplitude: 16.6±0.6 m/s
- Star: 54 Piscium A

Physical characteristics
- Mass: ≥0.228±0.011 M_{J}

54 Piscium b (HD 3651 b), occasionally catalogued as 54 Piscium Ab to differentiate from the brown dwarf in the system, is an extrasolar planet approximately 36 light-years away in the constellation of Pisces. It was discovered orbiting the orange dwarf star 54 Piscium. Its minimum mass is one-fifth that of Jupiter, and it orbits the star in a very eccentric orbit about every two months.

== Discovery ==
On January 16, 2003, a team of astronomers (led by Geoff Marcy) announced the discovery of an extrasolar planet around 54 Piscium using the radial velocity method, a process utilizing the "wobbling" effect that a star may experience if something is tugging on it. The planet has been estimated to have a mass of only 20 percent that of Jupiter (making the planet around the same size and mass of Saturn).

== Orbit and mass ==
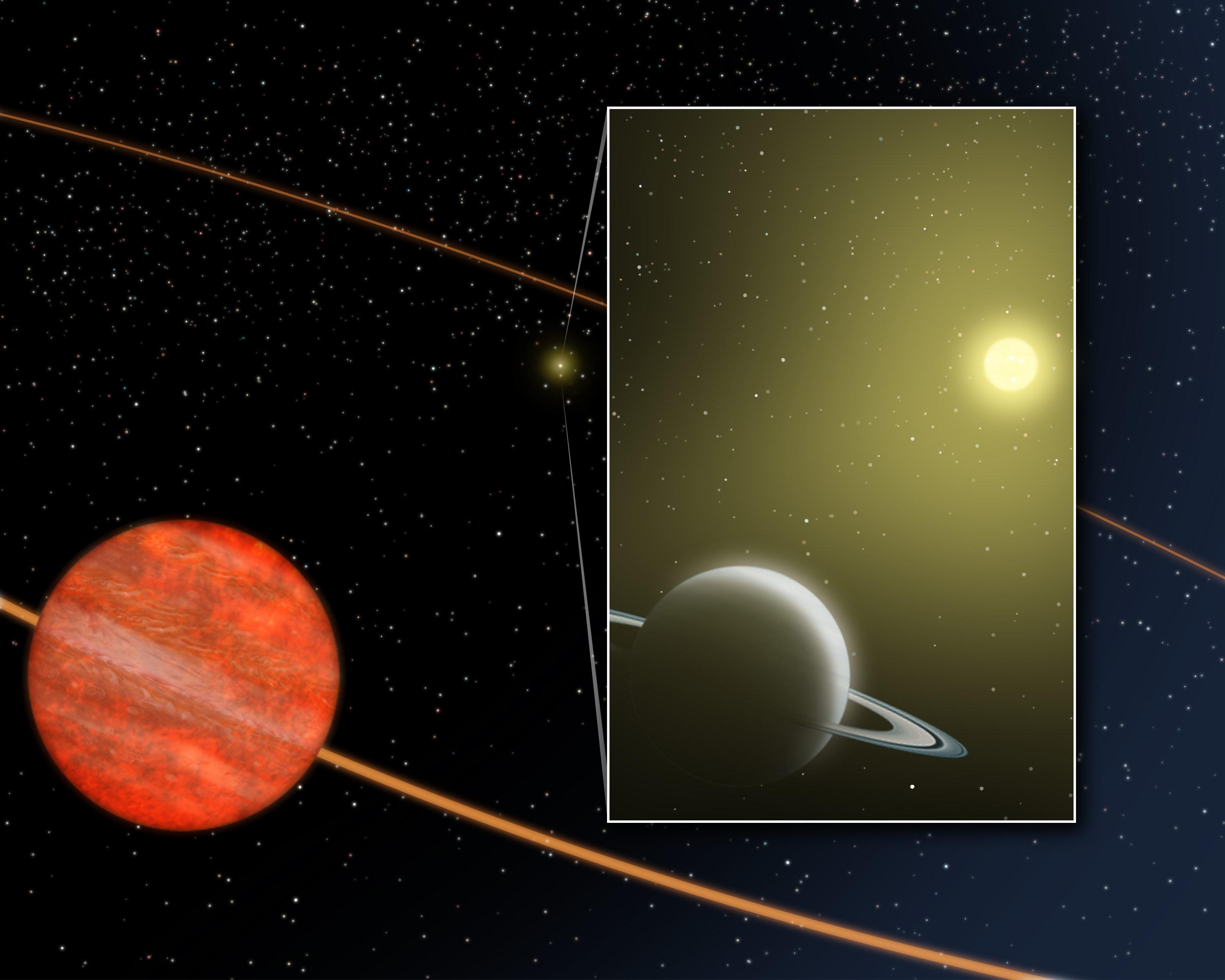
An artist's impression of the brown dwarf (54 Piscium B) and the planet closer to its sun (54 Piscium b).

The planet orbits its sun at a distance of 0.28 astronomical units (which would be within the orbit of Mercury), which takes approximately 62 days to complete. The planet has a high eccentricity of about 0.63. The highly elliptical orbit, however, suggested that the gravity of an unseen object farther away from the star was pulling the planet outward. The reason for the eccentric orbit became clear with the discovery of the brown dwarf within the system.

=== Perturbation ===
The orbit of an Earth-like planet would need to be centered within 0.68 AU (around the orbital distance of Venus), which in a Keplerian system means a 240-day orbital period. In a 2006 simulation with the brown dwarf, 54 Piscium b's orbit "sweeps clean" most test particles within 0.5 AU, leaving only asteroids "in low-eccentricity orbits near the known planet’s apastron distance, near the 1:2 mean-motion resonance". Also, observation has ruled out Neptune-class or heavier planets with a period of one year or less; which still allows for Earth-sized planets at 0.6 AU or more.

== See also ==
- 109 Piscium b - another nearby planet in the constellation of Pisces
