= 54 Piscium =

Star in the constellation Pisces

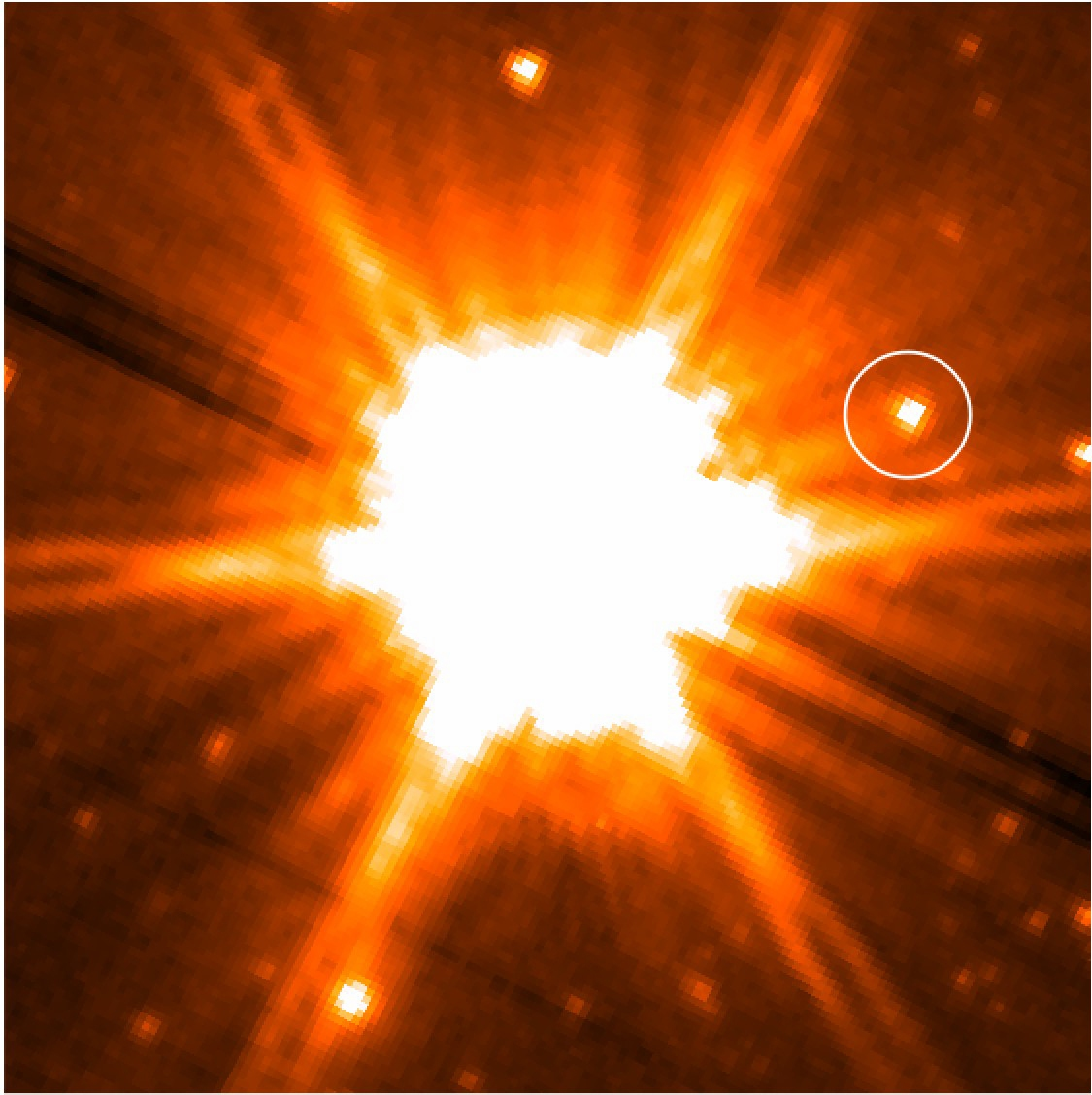
- 54 Piscium A and the brown dwarf 54 Piscium B (circled).

Observation data Epoch J2000.0 Equinox ICRS
- Constellation: Pisces
- Right ascension: 00^{h} 39^{m} 21.80539^{s}
- Declination: +21° 15′ 01.7129″
- Apparent magnitude (V): 5.88

Characteristics
- Spectral type: K0V / T7.5V
- U−B color index: +0.57
- B−V color index: +0.85
- Variable type: Suspected

Astrometry
Radial velocity (R_{v})	−33.07±0.13 km/s
Proper motion (μ)	RA: −461.948 mas/yr Dec.: −369.624 mas/yr
Parallax (π)	90.0248±0.0482 mas
Distance	36.23 ± 0.02 ly (11.108 ± 0.006 pc)
Absolute magnitude (M_{V})	5.65

Details

54 Psc A
Mass	0.848±0.040 M_{☉}
Radius	0.864±0.039 R_{☉}
Luminosity	0.51±0.03 L_{☉}
Surface gravity (log g)	4.52±0.01 cgs
Temperature	5,267±13 K
Metallicity [Fe/H]	+0.14±0.02 dex
Rotation	40.2±4.0 d
Age	10.0±3.5 Gyr

54 Psc B
Mass	48.1+4.4 −4.0 M_{Jup}
Radius	0.81±0.02 R_{Jup}
Luminosity	2.69+0.19 −0.18×10^{−6} L_{☉}
Temperature	809+15 −16 K

Other designations
- 54 Psc, NSV 245, BD+20°85, FK5 276, GJ 27, HD 3651, HIP 3093, HR 166, SAO 74175, LHS 1116, LTT 10224

Database references
SIMBAD	data

54 Piscium is an orange dwarf star approximately 36 light-years away in the constellation of Pisces. In 2003, an extrasolar planet was confirmed to be orbiting the star, and in 2006, a brown dwarf was also discovered orbiting it.

== Stellar components ==
The Flamsteed designation 54 Piscium originated in the star catalogue of the British astronomer John Flamsteed, first published in 1712. It has an apparent magnitude of 5.86, allowing it to be seen with the unaided eye under suitable viewing conditions. The star has a classification of K0V, with the luminosity class V indicating this is a main sequence star that is generating energy at its core through the thermonuclear fusion of hydrogen into helium. The effective temperature of the photosphere is about 5,267 K, giving it the characteristic orange hue of a K-type star.

As a typical K-type dwarf, 54 Piscium is smaller and fainter than the Sun, at 85% of the Sun's mass and half of the luminosity. The angular diameter has been directly determined by interferometry using the CHARA array, yielding a radius 86.4% of the Sun's radius. The rotational period of 54 Piscium is about 40.2 days. The age of the star is about 6.4 billion years, based on chromospheric activity and isochronal analysis. Another study suggest a higher age of ten billion years. There is some uncertainty in the scientific press concerning the higher ratio of elements heavier than hydrogen compared to those found in the Sun; what astronomers term the metallicity. Santos et al. (2004) report the logarithm of the abundance ratio of iron to hydrogen, [Fe/H], to be 0.12 dex, whereas Cenarro et al. (2007) published a value of –0.15 dex.

Long term observation of this star's magnetic activity levels suggests that it is entering a Maunder minimum period, which means it may undergo an extended period of low starspot numbers. It has a Sun-like activity cycle that has been decreasing in magnitude. As of 2010, the most recent period of peak activity was 1992–1996, which showed a lower level of activity than the previous peak in 1976–1980.

The star rotates at an inclination of 83^{+7}_{−56} degrees relative to Earth.

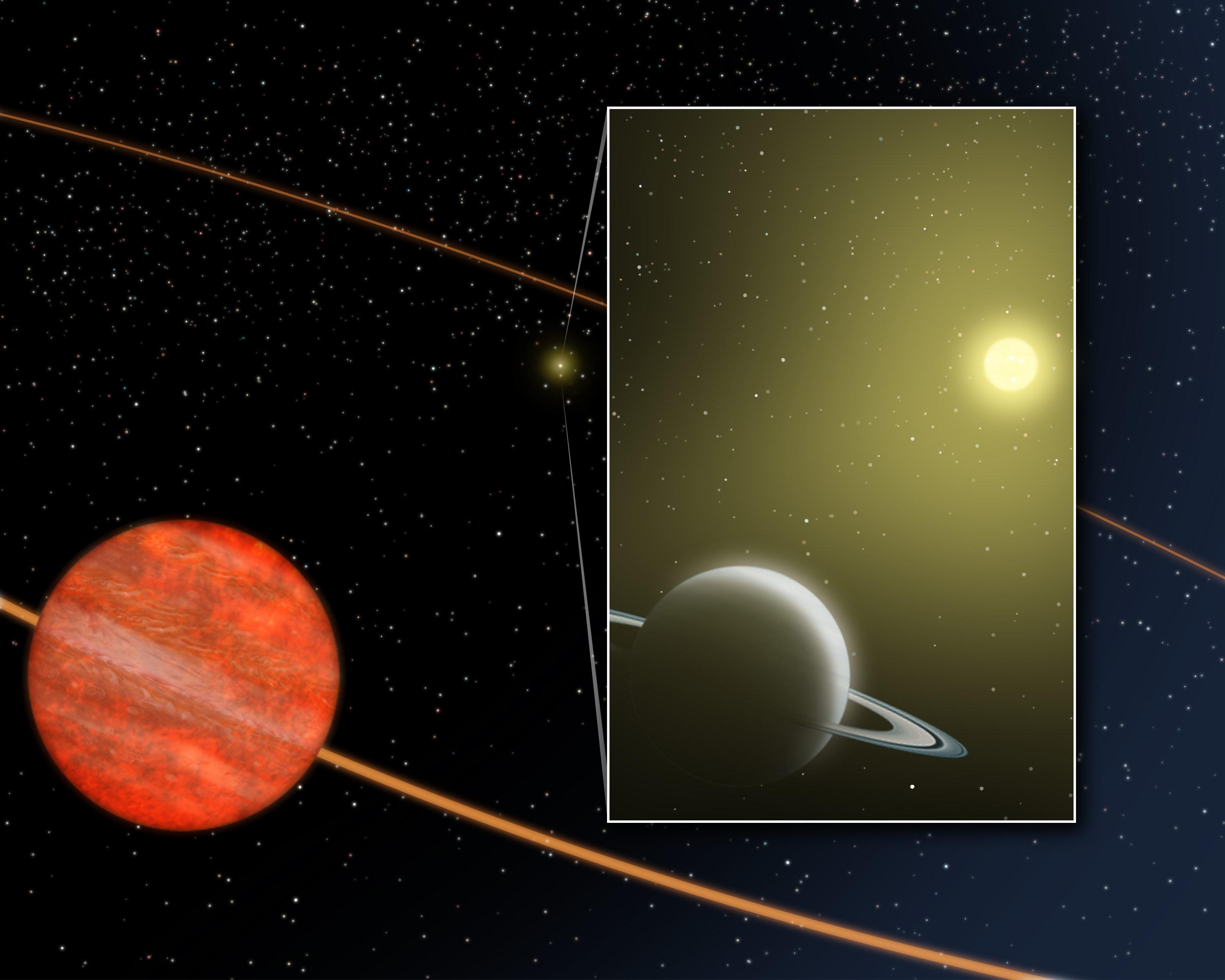
An artist's impression of brown dwarf 54 Piscium B and the planet 54 Piscium b.

In 2006, a direct image of 54 Piscium showed that there was a brown dwarf companion to 54 Piscium A. 54 Piscium B is thought to be a "methane brown dwarf" of the spectral type "T7.5V". The mass of this object is about 50 times the mass of Jupiter, lower than the limit for hydrogen burning of about 75 Jupiter masses. Despite its large mass, 54 Piscium B is smaller than Jupiter with just 80% its radius. Similar to Gliese 570 D, this brown dwarf is thought to have a surface temperature of about 810 K (537 °C).

When 54 Piscium B was directly imaged by NASA's Spitzer Space Telescope, it was shown that the brown dwarf had a projected separation of around 476 astronomical units from the primary star. 54 Piscium B was the first brown dwarf to be detected around a star with an already known extrasolar planet (based on radial velocity surveys).

== Planetary system ==
On January 16, 2003, a team of astronomers (led by Geoff Marcy) announced the discovery of an extrasolar planet (named 54 Piscium b) around 54 Piscium. The planet has been estimated to have a mass of only 20 percent that of Jupiter (making the planet around the same size and mass of Saturn).

The planet orbits its sun at a distance of 0.28 astronomical units (which would be within the orbit of Mercury), which takes approximately 62 days to complete. It has been assumed that the planet shares the star's inclination and so has real mass close to its minimum mass; however, several "hot Jupiters" are known to be oblique relative to the stellar axis.

The planet has a high eccentricity of about 0.65. The highly elliptical orbit suggested that the gravity of an unseen object farther away from the star was pulling the planet outward. That cause was verified with the discovery of the brown dwarf within the system.

The orbit of an Earth-like planet would need to be centered within 0.68 AU (around the orbital distance of Venus), which in a Keplerian system means a 240-day orbital period. In a later simulation with the brown dwarf, 54 Piscium b's orbit "sweeps clean" most test particles within 0.5 AU, leaving only asteroids "in low-eccentricity orbits near the known planet's apastron distance, near the 1:2 mean-motion resonance". Also, observation has ruled out Neptune-class or heavier planets with a period of one year or less; which still allows for Earth-sized planets at 0.6 AU or more.

A two planet fit to the radial velocities with two circular planets in a 2:1 orbital resonance is possible however it does not significantly improve the solution, and therefore does not justify the additional complexity.

The 54 Piscium planetary system
Companion (in order from star)	Mass	Semimajor axis (AU)	Orbital period (days)	Eccentricity	Inclination (°)	Radius
b	≥0.228±0.011 M_{J}	0.295±0.029	62.250±0.004	0.645±0.02	—	—

== See also ==
- 107 Piscium
- 109 Piscium
- Delta Trianguli
- Upsilon Andromedae
