= OV5-8 =

US Air Force satellite

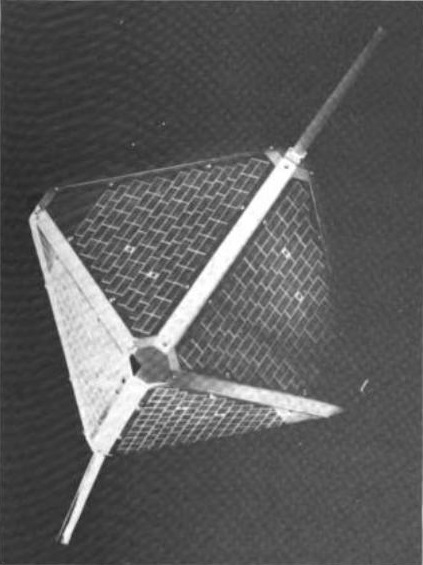
- OV5-1 (a typical OV5 satellite)
- Mission type: Materials science
- Operator: USAF
- COSPAR ID: 1968-F07
- SATCAT no.: F00478

Spacecraft properties
- Manufacturer: TRW Inc.
- Launch mass: 9 kg (20 lb)

Start of mission
- Launch date: 16 August 1968 20:57:44 UTC
- Rocket: Atlas Burner 2
- Launch site: Vandenberg Space Launch Complex 3

Orbital parameters
- Epoch: 16 August 1968

Orbiting Vehicle 5-8 (also known as OV5-8 and ERS 19), was a materials science microsatellite launched, along with 12 other satellites in the biggest multi-satellite launch to date, on 18 August 1968 on the first Atlas Burner 2 rocket. The rocket and all payloads were lost when the second stage (Burner) shroud collapsed after first stage (Atlas) cutoff. OV5-8 was the third satellite in the OV5 series of the United States Air Force's Orbiting Vehicle program.

== Background ==
The Orbiting Vehicle satellite program arose from a US Air Force initiative, begun in the early 1960s, to reduce the expense of space research. Through this initiative, satellites would be standardized to improve reliability and cost-efficiency, and where possible, they would fly on test vehicles or be piggybacked with other satellites. In 1961, the Air Force Office of Aerospace Research (OAR) created the Aerospace Research Support Program (ARSP) to request satellite research proposals and choose mission experiments. The USAF Space and Missiles Organization created their own analog of the ARSP called the Space Experiments Support Program (SESP), which sponsored a greater proportion of technological experiments than the ARSP. Five distinct OV series of standardized satellites were developed under the auspices of these agencies.

The OV5 program was a continuation of the Environmental Research Satellite (ERS) series developed by Space Technology Laboratories, a subdivision of TRW Inc. These were very small satellites launched pick-a-back with primary payloads since 1962—a natural fit under the Orbiting Vehicle umbrella. The primary innovation over the earlier ERS series was a command receiver, allowing instructions to be sent from the ground, and a Pulse-code modulation digital telemetry system, versus the analog transmitters used on prior ERS missions. Like prior ERS, the OV5s were spin-stabilized and heat was passively controlled. All of the OV5 series were built by TRW with the exception of OV5-6, built by AFCRL, and OV5-9, built by Northrop Corporation.

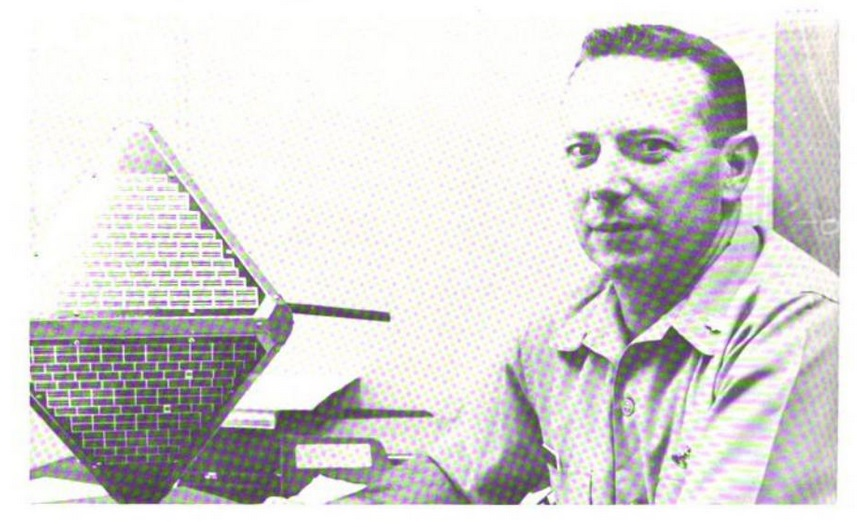
Major Ronald A. Bena, project manager for OV5

== Spacecraft design ==
The OV5 satellites resembled their ERS predecessors. OV5-8 was made of aluminum struts outlining a tetrahedron .3 m (0.98 ft) in width, with 816 solar cells generating 5.5 Watts distributed over the eight triangular faces. The bottom vertex housed the fitting that attached to the launch vehicle; the other vertices were used for mounting experiments. Power was stored in a nickel–cadmium battery. An on-board timer was designed to shut off the satellite after 18 months of operation.

== Experiments ==
OV5-8 carried some sort of vacuum-friction experiment

== Mission ==
OV5-8 was launched on the maiden flight of the Atlas Burner 2 rocket on 16 Aug 1968 at 20:57:44 UTC from Vandenberg Space Launch Complex 3 along with 12 other satellites—the most orbited on one rocket to date. During the flight, the first stage (Atlas) functioned properly, but the protective shroud on the second stage (Burner), three times larger than the one used on the Thor-Burner collapsed. This kept the second stage from detaching and firing as programmed, and all payloads were lost.

== Legacy and status ==
There were seven orbited satellites in the OV5 series launched between 1967 and 1969, six of them successful. The launch of OV5-8 marked the first time an ARSP payload was included in a SESP launch (SEPS P68-1); SESP absorbed the ARSP later that year.
