= 109 Piscium =

Star in the constellation Pisces

- Location of 109 Piscium (circled in red)

Observation data Epoch J2000.0 Equinox ICRS
- Constellation: Pisces
- Right ascension: 01^{h} 44^{m} 55.8255^{s}
- Declination: +20° 04′ 59.337″
- Apparent magnitude (V): 6.27

Characteristics
- Evolutionary stage: subgiant
- Spectral type: G3 Va
- B−V color index: 0.720±0.009

Astrometry
Radial velocity (R_{v})	−45.53±0.09 km/s
Proper motion (μ)	RA: −43.357(42) mas/yr Dec.: −104.936(34) mas/yr
Parallax (π)	30.1535±0.0402 mas
Distance	108.2 ± 0.1 ly (33.16 ± 0.04 pc)
Absolute magnitude (M_{V})	3.73

Details
Mass	1.11±0.03 M_{☉}
Radius	1.92±0.05 R_{☉}
Luminosity	2.89±0.08 L_{☉}
Surface gravity (log g)	4.05±0.05 cgs
Temperature	5,641±28 K
Metallicity [Fe/H]	0.15±0.04 dex
Rotation	32.6±1.6 d
Rotational velocity (v sin i)	1.3 km/s
Age	6.75±0.71 Gyr

Other designations
- 109 Psc, BD+19°282, GJ 72, HD 10697, HIP 8159, HR 508

Database references
SIMBAD	data
Exoplanet Archive	data

109 Piscium is a yellow hued G-type subgiant star located about 108 light-years away in the zodiac constellation of Pisces. It is near the lower limit of visibility to the naked eye with an apparent visual magnitude of 6.27. The star is moving closer to the Earth with a heliocentric radial velocity of −45.5 km/s. It has one known exoplanet.

With a stellar classification of G3 Va, this is a Sun-like star with a similar mass but a 91% larger radius. (Cowley and Bidelman (1979) had this classified as a subgiant star that is leaving the main sequence.) It is 6.75 billion years old with a higher abundance of iron and a low projected rotational velocity of 1.3 km/s. The star is radiating 2.9 times the Sun's luminosity from its photosphere at an effective temperature of 5,442 K.

== Planetary system ==
On 1 November 1999 the discovery of an extrasolar planet orbiting this star was announced. The planet has a minimum mass of about 6 times that of Jupiter and takes just under three years to orbit its parent star. It orbits within the habitable zone.

The star rotates at an inclination of 69^{+21}_{−26} degrees relative to Earth. It is probable that this planet shares that inclination. In 2022, the inclination and true mass of 109 Piscium b were measured via astrometry. The inclination estimate is consistent with that of the stellar rotation.

A candidate second planet was identified in a 2026 study using HARPS-N. This would be a hot Neptune, orbiting close to the star with an 8-day period.

The 109 Piscium planetary system
Companion (in order from star)	Mass	Semimajor axis (AU)	Orbital period (days)	Eccentricity	Inclination (°)	Radius
.01 (unconfirmed)	≥16.6±2.6 M_{🜨}	—	8.1127±0.0006	0.18+0.15 −0.12	—	—
b	6.77+0.89 −0.56 M_{J}	2.143+0.062 −0.063	1,075.50±0.69	0.1035+0.0072 −0.0073	72+13 −15 or 108+15 −13	—

== Popular culture ==
In the 1983 Star Trek novel The Wounded Sky by Diane Duane, the USS Enterprise intentionally causes 109 Piscium to go supernova by engaging its warp drive too close to the star, in order to destroy a group of pursuing Klingon vessels. Mr. Spock informs the "Interstellar Astronomical Union" of the change in status of the star, and Captain Kirk experiences an uneasy sense that he may "get in trouble with Starfleet" over this arguably rash course of action.

== See also ==
- 54 Piscium
- Lists of exoplanets
- Giant planets in the habitable zone
