= 109 Piscium b =

Long-period gas giant orbiting 109 Piscium

Discovery
- Discovered by: California and Carnegie Planet Search
- Discovery site: W. M. Keck Observatory
- Discovery date: November 1, 1999
- Detection method: Doppler spectroscopy

Orbital characteristics
- Semi-major axis: 2.051+0.079 −0.087 AU
- Eccentricity: 0.104+0.009 −0.008
- Orbital period (sidereal): 2.944 ± 0.002 years (1,075.30 ± 0.73 d)
- Inclination: 86.116°+19.957° −20.530°
- Longitude of ascending node: 38.852°+15.084° −21.589°
- Time of perihelion: 2,449,333.898+14.739 −15.380
- Argument of perihelion: 112.816°+5.254° −5.448°
- Semi-amplitude: 114.583+1.067 −1.196 m/s
- Star: 109 Piscium

Physical characteristics
- Mean radius: 1.152 R_{J}
- Mass: 5.743+1.011 −0.289 M_{J}

109 Piscium b (aka HD 10697 b) is a long-period extrasolar planet discovered in orbit around 109 Piscium. It is about 5.74 times the mass of Jupiter and is likely to be a gas giant. As is common for long-period planets discovered around other stars, it has an orbital eccentricity greater than that of Jupiter.

The discoverers estimate its effective temperature as 264 K from solar heating, but it could be at least 10 to 20 K warmer because of internal heating. It orbits within the habitable zone.

Preliminary astrometric measurements suggested that the orbital inclination is 170.3°, yielding an object mass of 38 times that of Jupiter, which would make it a brown dwarf. However, subsequent analysis indicates that the precision of the measurements used to derive the astrometric orbit is insufficient to constrain the parameters. A more plausible suggestion is that this planet shares its star's inclination, of 69^{+21}_{−26}°. In 2022, the inclination and true mass of 109 Piscium b were measured via astrometry. The inclination estimate is consistent with that of the stellar rotation.

== See also ==
- 54 Piscium b – another nearby planet in the constellation of Pisces
- List of exoplanets discovered before 2000
