= DASH (satellite) =

DASH (short for Density And Scale Height) were a pair of 2.5 meter balloon satellites launched in 1963. They were designed to measure air density at very high altitude, but their orbit was significantly affected by solar radiation pressure.
