= TACOMSAT =

Communications satellite of the United States Air Force

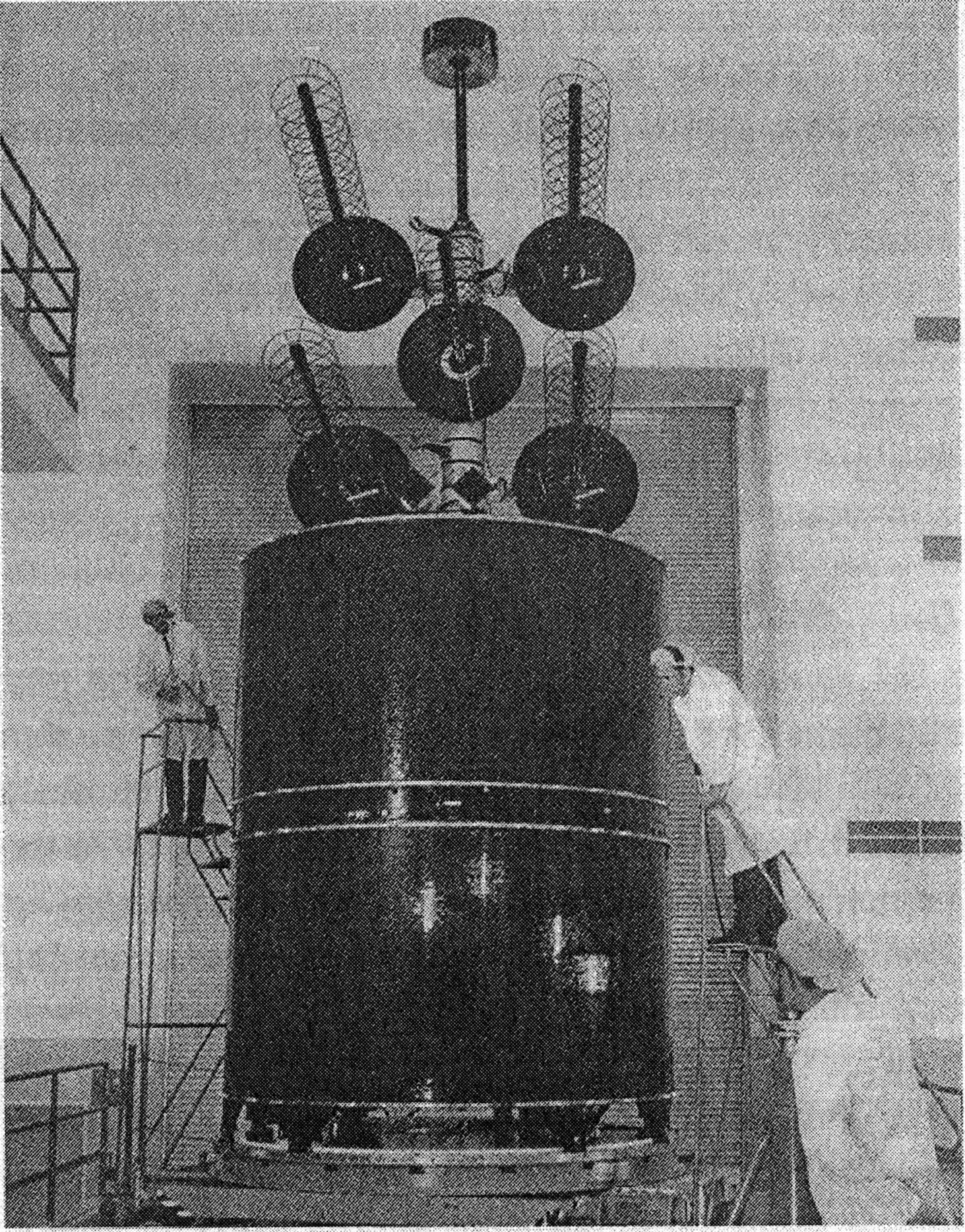
- The TACOMSAT experimental communications satellite
- Mission type: Technology
- Operator: United States Department of Defense
- COSPAR ID: 1969-013A
- SATCAT no.: 03691
- Mission duration: 1,405 days

Spacecraft properties
- Bus: HS-308
- Manufacturer: Hughes Aircraft Company
- Dry mass: 645 kilograms (1,422 lb)
- Power: Solar cells (body mounted), batteries

Start of mission
- Launch date: February 9, 1969
- Rocket: Titan IIIC
- Launch site: Cape Canaveral Air Force Station Space Launch Complex 41

Orbital parameters
- Reference system: Geocentric
- Regime: Geostationary
- Perigee altitude: 35,692 kilometers (22,178 mi)
- Apogee altitude: 35,822 kilometers (22,259 mi)
- Inclination: 3.7° degrees
- Period: 1,434 minutes

TACOMSAT (also known as TACSAT 1, OPS 0757, or Tactical Communications Satellite) was a communications satellite designed and built by Hughes Aircraft Corporation under the direction of the United States Air Force Space and Missile Systems Organization (SAMSO). TACOMSAT was used by the United States Department of Defense to explore the feasibility of geostationary satellite communications between ground stations comprising fixed bases, military field units, aircraft, and ships.

== Construction ==
At 7.62 meters (25.0 ft) in length and 2.81 feet (0.86 m) in diameter, TACOMSAT was the largest and most powerful communications satellite at the time of its launch. The 3.4 meters (11 ft)-long main cylinder of the HS-308 bus was spin-stabilized at 54 rpm with the antennas mounted to a despun platform in an early version of the Hughes Gyrostat design. The platform was equipped with a variety of antennas, including a five-element UHF bifilar helical antenna array, two X band horn antennas, and a biconical antenna for telemetry and control.

The UHF transponder could provide a maximum RF output of 230 watts over a 10 MHz bandwidth, while the X band transponder could provide 30 watts over 10 MHz of bandwidth. The two transponders could be interconnected, allowing all signals to be exchanged between bands with a reduced usable bandwidth of 425 kHz.

The combination of high RF power and stable antenna platform resulted in strong signals that could be received by antennas as small as 1 meter (3.3 ft) in diameter. This permitted remotely deployed field units to communicate with one another and with headquarters. High RF power also permitted simultaneous access by many users across the transponder bandwidth.

== Mission ==
After a February 9, 1969 launch on a Titan IIIC launch vehicle, TACOMSAT reached a geostationary transfer orbit over the Pacific Ocean. After more than three years of successful experiments by the US Army, US Air Force, and US Navy, TACSAT was decommissioned on December 16, 1972.
