= Vela 4B =

U.S. reconnaissance satellite

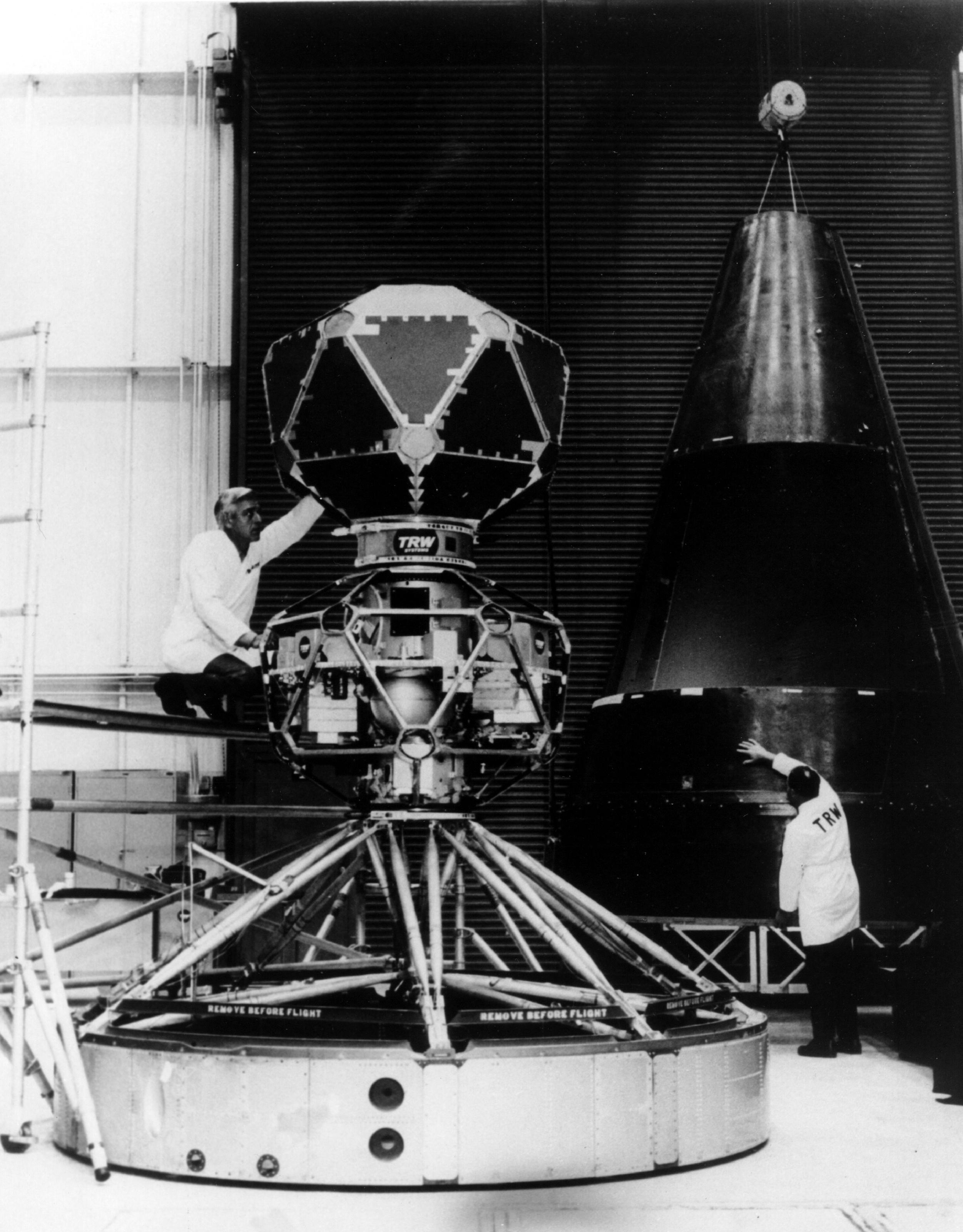
- Operator: USAF
- COSPAR ID: 1967-040B
- SATCAT no.: 2766

Spacecraft properties
- Manufacturer: TRW
- Launch mass: 225 kilograms (496 lb)
- Power: 120 W

Start of mission
- Launch date: April 28, 1967, 10:01 UTC
- Rocket: Titan 3C-10
- Launch site: Cape Canaveral LC-41

Orbital parameters
- Reference system: Geocentric
- Regime: Highly Elliptical
- Perigee altitude: 107,337 kilometres (66,696 mi)
- Apogee altitude: 114,612 kilometres (71,217 mi)
- Inclination: 33.06°
- Period: 6,671.8 minutes (111.197 h)
- Epoch: 1 May 1967

Vela 4B (also known Vela 8 and OPS 6679) was an American reconnaissance satellite to detect explosions and nuclear tests on land and in space. It was released together with Vela 4A, ERS 18, OV5 1 and OV5 3.

== Instruments ==
- 2 optical bhangmeters observing Earth
- 12 external X-ray detectors
- 18 internal neutron and gamma-ray detectors

== See also ==
- Vela (satellite)
