= Vela 4A =

American reconnaissance satellite

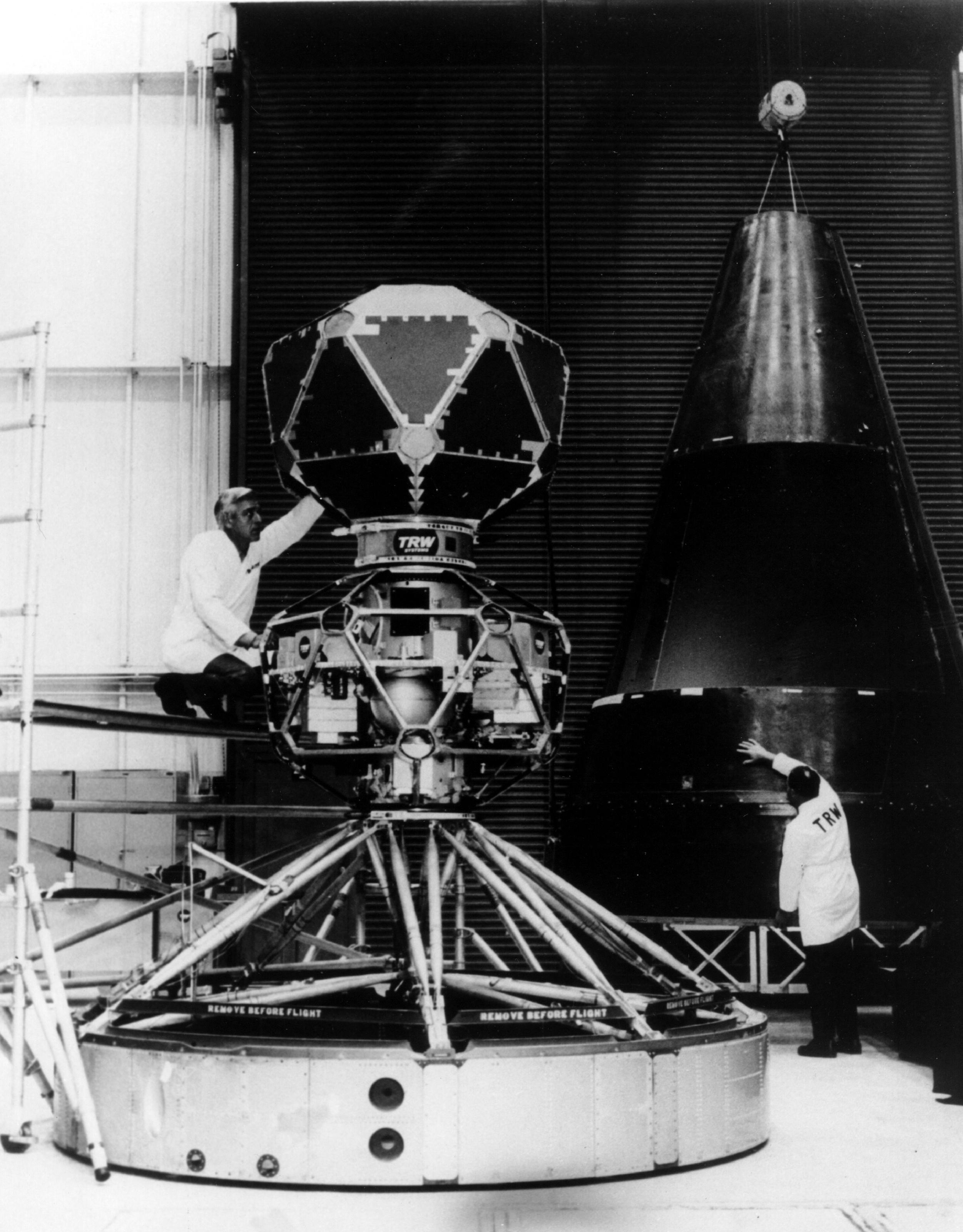
- Operator: USAF
- COSPAR ID: 1967-040A
- SATCAT no.: 2765

Spacecraft properties
- Manufacturer: TRW
- Launch mass: 225 kilograms (496 lb)
- Power: 120 W

Start of mission
- Launch date: April 28, 1967, 10:01 UTC
- Rocket: Titan III-C
- Launch site: Cape Canaveral LC-41

Orbital parameters
- Reference system: Geocentric
- Regime: Highly Elliptical
- Semi-major axis: 117,619 kilometres (73,085 mi)
- Perigee altitude: 53,631.5 kilometres (33,325.1 mi)
- Apogee altitude: 161,866.1 kilometres (100,578.9 mi)
- Inclination: 19.9°
- Period: 6,690.8 minutes (111.513 h)

Vela 4A (also known Vela 7 and OPS 6638) was an American reconnaissance satellite built to detect explosions and nuclear tests on land and in space. It was released together with Vela 4B, ERS 18, OV5 1 and OV5 3.

The ship remains in orbit around Earth.

== Instruments ==
- 2 optical bhangmeters observing Earth
- 12 external X-ray detectors
- 18 internal neutron and gamma-ray detectors

== See also ==
- Vela (satellite)
