= Highly elliptical orbit =

Orbit in the two body case with high eccentricity

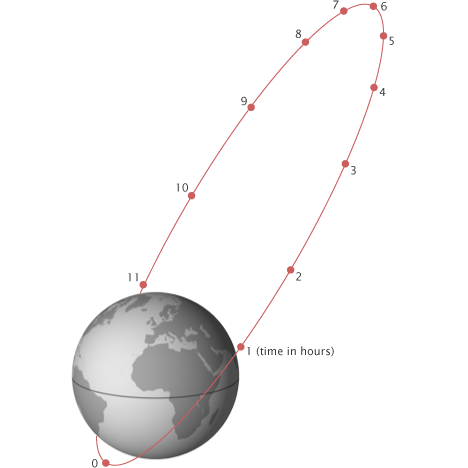
Molniya orbit for the Northern hemisphere

A highly elliptical orbit (HEO) or highly eccentric orbit is an orbit of one body about another with high eccentricity, usually referring to one around Earth.

Examples of inclined HEO orbits include Molniya orbits, named after the Molniya Soviet communication satellites which used them, and Tundra orbits. Many US satellites also have used these orbits, satellites such as the Trumpet electronics intelligence satellites.

The acronym HEO normally is expanded to Highly Eccentric Orbit by orbital analysts since all orbits around planets, etc are ellipses - the term "highly elliptical" is not very clear as to what is exaggerated. It would be more proper to call these orbits "elongated" than "highly elliptical".

Highly eccentric orbits have two main uses - as transfer orbits and as good orbits for communication with or surveillance of the Polar regions. The transfer orbit was proposed by the German scientist Walter Hohmann in 1925, it connects two circular orbits, a lower one and a higher one, with an eccentric orbit. There are many HEO orbits where a launch vehicle initially injects a spacecraft into a LEO orbit and then an upper stage injects the payload, intended to go to geosynchronous orbit, into a HEO transfer orbit and then a final stage or engine circularizes the payload in the intended geosynchronous orbit.

When chosen for communications or surveillance, these extremely elongated orbits also can provide long dwell times at a point in the sky during the approach to, and descent from, apogee. Bodies moving through the long apogee dwell appear to move slowly, and remain at high altitude over Polar latitude ground sites for long periods of time. This makes these elliptical orbits useful for communications satellites. The Northern Hemisphere has far more landmass, and it belongs to historically competitive countries, so most HEO satellites are in orbits which maximize time over the Northern Polar regions. Most of the Southern Hemisphere is covered by water and has been less interesting to these adversarial countries.

Geostationary orbits cannot serve polar latitudes because their elevation above the horizon from these ground sites is too low. The latitude limit for a GEO sat is 81 degrees with a practical limit of just above 75 degrees. Many GEO comm sats have custom "foot prints" and focus their signals at their primary service areas, so above 60 degrees a larger ground antenna and clear line of sight is needed.

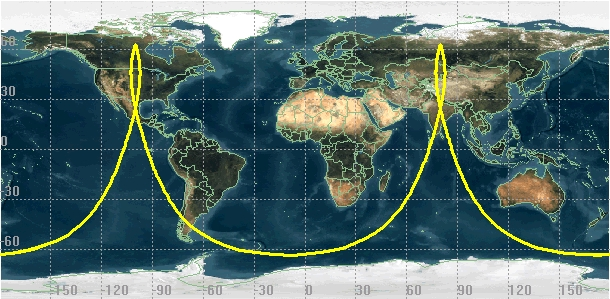
Groundtrack of a Molniya orbit

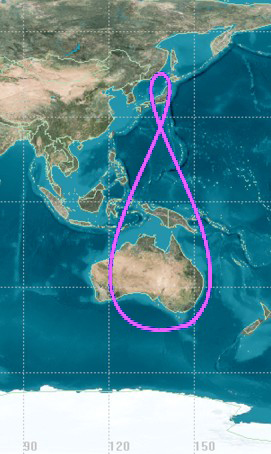
The groundtrack of a QZSS orbit

Sirius Satellite Radio used inclined HEO orbits, specifically the Tundra orbits, to keep two satellites positioned above North America while another satellite quickly sweeps through the southern part of its 24-hour orbit. The longitude above which the satellites dwell at apogee in the small loop remains relatively constant as Earth rotates. The three separate orbits are spaced equally around the Earth, but share a common ground track.
