= −1 (disambiguation) =

−1 is the negative of the number 1.

−1 (minus 1, negative 1, dash 1) may also refer to:

== Mathematics ==
- the exponent ^{−1} denoting a multiplicative inverse or reciprocal
- the superscript ^{−1} denoting an inverse function

== Arts and entertainment ==
- Godzilla Minus One, a 2023 Japanese epic kaiju film
- Minus One (TV series), a 2019 Indian streaming series
- "Minus One" (short story), by J. G. Ballard, 1963
- Minus One (band), a band from Cyprus
- "The Negative One", a 2014 song by Slipknot
- "−1", a song by Mudvayne from the 2000 album L.D. 50
- Minus-One recordings, a variant mix of a multi-track recording in the Philippines

== Other uses ==
- DASH 1.0, Desktop and mobile Architecture for System Hardware
- DASH 1, one of the DASH satellites
- DASH 1, a Kyoto model car

== See also ==
- One (disambiguation)
- −2 (disambiguation)
- 1 BC
