= One (disambiguation) =

One or 1 is a number. It most often refers to:

- 1 (year), first year of the AD era
- 1 BC, the year before AD 1
- One (pronoun), a pronoun in the English language
- January, the first month of the year in the Julian and Gregorian calendars

One, 1 or ONE may also refer to:

== Arts, media, and activism ==
=== Film, broadcast media, and news ===
==== Movies ====
- One: The Movie, a 2005 documentary about the meaning of life
- 1 (2009 film), a 2009 Hungarian film by Pater Sparrow
- 1 (2013 film), about Formula One
- 1: Nenokkadine, a 2014 Indian Telugu-language film by Sukumar starring Mahesh Babu
- One (2017 film), an Indian Bengali-language crime thriller by Birsa Dasgupta
- One (2021 film), an Indian Malayalam-language political thriller by Santhosh Viswanath

==== Television episodes ====
- "One" (Law & Order: Criminal Intent), S1 E1, 2001
- "One" (Star Trek: Voyager), S4 E25, 1998
- "One" (Casualty), S31 E45, 2017

==== Television networks, channels and stations ====
- Channel 1 (disambiguation)
- TV1 (disambiguation)
- Europe:
  - One (German TV channel)
  - One (Maltese TV channel)
  - ONE Television, a defunct Swedish TV channel
  - SVT1, a Swedish television channel
  - RTÉ One, an Irish television station
  - BBC One, a British television station
  - TF1, a French television channel
  - Rai 1, an Italian television channel
  - RTP1, a Portuguese television channel
  - La 1 (Spain), a Spanish television channel
  - TVR 1, a Romanian television channel
- North America:
  - One (Canadian TV channel)
  - NY1, a local news channel in New York City
- Asia and Oceania:
  - DD 1, flagship TV channel of the Indian public broadcaster Doordarshan
  - ONE31, a Thai digital terrestrial network owned by The One Enterprise (part of GMM Grammy)
  - One (Southeast Asia TV channel), a defunct television channel
  - Singapore ONE, a broadband network in Singapore
  - One News (TV channel), a Philippine-based news channel operated by Cignal TV
  - One PH, a Philippine-based teleradyo channel operated by Cignal TV
  - One Sports (TV channel), a Philippine-based television sports channel operated by TV5 Network
    - One Sports+
  - One, the former name of 10 Bold, an Australian television channel
  - TVNZ 1, a New Zealand television channel
  - Kiri One TV, a Kiribati television channel

==== Streaming services ====
- NHK ONE, a Japanese streaming service
- Viva One, a Philippine streaming service

==== Radio stations ====
- Radio 1 (disambiguation)
- One FM, the former name of Malaysian Chinese-language radio station Eight FM
- One FM, the former name of Singaporean radio station Gold 905
- One FM 91.3, a Singaporean radio station

==== Other uses in film, broadcast media, and news ====
- One, an alias of Vecna, the main antagonist of Stranger Things
- One, a character from the fifth season of Battle for Dream Island, an animated web series
- One (radio series), a British comedy series by David Quantick
- One (website), an Israeli news site

=== Literature and activism ===
- One (Crossan novel), the 2016 Carnegie Medal winning work by Sarah Crossan
- One (David Karp novel), a 1953 dystopian novel, also published as Escape to Nowhere
- One (Bach novel), 1988, by Richard Bach
- One (manga artist), pseudonym of a Japanese manga artist
- One, by Conrad Williams, the 2010 British Fantasy Award winner for Best Novel
- One, a magazine published by the Catholic Near East Welfare Association
- ONE, a magazine published by the National Association of Free Will Baptists
- One, the first U.S. homophile magazine, published by One, Inc. from 1953 to 1969
- ONE, Inc., a gay rights organization founded in the US in 1952
- One Campaign, a campaign to fight global AIDS and poverty

=== Music ===
==== Songs ====
See One (song)

==== EPs ====
- One (Angela Aki EP), 2005
- One (Charlotte Church EP), 2012
- One (Hillsong United EP), 1998
- ONE (Lee Gikwang EP), 2017
- One (The Never Ending EP), 2014
- One (Ra EP), 2000
- One (Tying Tiffany EP), 2013
- One, by The Brian Jonestown Massacre, 2009

==== Albums ====
See One (album)

==== Other uses in music ====
- One (band), a Greek Cypriot boys band
- One Music PH, a Philippine online music portal
- One (opera), a 2003 chamber opera by Michel van der Aa
- One Enterprises, a production company founded by American hip-hop artist Akir
- One (rapper), a South Korean actor and musician

=== Video games ===
- One (video game), released in 1997 for the Sony PlayStation
- One (N-Gage game), a 2005 video game for N-Gage and N-Gage 2.0
- One: Kagayaku Kisetsu e, a 1998 Japanese video game by Tactics

== Places and transportation ==
=== Regions and geographical features ===
- Ain (department number: 01), a French department
- Ona, Vestland (sometimes spelled One), an island in Øygarden, Norway
- L'One, a river that joins the Pique in Bagnères-de-Luchon, France

=== Roads and transit lines ===
- List of highways numbered 1
- List of public transport routes numbered 1
- Onehunga Line (timetable code: ONE), Auckland, New Zealand

=== Automobiles ===
- BMW 1 Series, a subcompact car built since 2004
- Carver One, a microcar
- Fiat 1, an automobile manufactured by Fiat from 1908 to 1910
- Haima 1, a city car built since 2012
- Li One, a luxury mid-size crossover SUV
- Lightyear One, an all-solar-electric executive liftback produced from 2022 to 2023 later renamed to the Lightyear 0
- Lynk & Co 01, a compact SUV built since 2017
- Mercedes-AMG ONE, a plug-in hybrid sports car
- MG One, a compact crossover SUV
- Mini One, a three or five door hatchback built since 2000
- Nikola One, a cancelled proposed electric semi-truck tractor unit
- Polestar 1, a plug-in hybrid sports car
- Saleen 1, a sports car
- Smart #1, a battery electric subcompact crossover SUV

=== Other uses in transportation ===
- One (train operating company), a 2004–2012 British company, renamed to National Express East Anglia in 2008
- Ocean Network Express Holdings, Ltd., a Japanese container transportation and shipping company
- OneAircraft One, a Slovenian aircraft design
- One Aviation, a 2015–2021 American merger of aircraft manufacturers Eclipse Aerospace and Kestrel Aircraft
- One, a call sign suffix of any official vehicle used for the transportation of the president of the United States, for example Air Force One

== Government and military ==
- National Statistics Office (Dominican Republic) (Oficina Nacional de Estadística)
- Office of National Estimates, a forerunner of the U.S. National Intelligence Council
- Operation Noble Eagle, a U.S. and Canadian military operation in response to the September 11, 2001 attacks
- Organisation of National Ex-Servicemen (O.N.E.), an organization of veterans of military service in Ireland

== Science and technology ==
=== Astronomy ===
- Ceres (dwarf planet), with the Minor-planet designation of 1 Ceres

=== Electronics and computing ===
==== Telecom companies ====
- One Montenegro, a Montenegrin mobile phone operator
- One NZ, a telecommunications company in New Zealand
- One (Telekom Slovenija Group), former Macedonian GSM/UMTS mobile operator
- One Albania, an Albanian telecommunications company
- One Hungary, a Hungarian telecommunications company
- Orange Austria, previously ONE, an Austrian mobile network operator

==== Android smartphones ====
- Android One, a line of consumer electronics
- GeeksPhone One
- HTC One series, Taiwanese
- OnePlus One, the first released by Chinese smartphone manufacturer OnePlus
- Red Hydrogen One

==== Video game consoles ====
- PS One, a smaller version of the original Sony PlayStation
- Xbox One, eighth-generation, by Microsoft

==== Other uses in electronics and computing ====
- The Red One (camera), the first camera released by the Red Digital Cinema Camera Company
- Elonex ONE, or simply ONE, a subnotebook computer
- Ubuntu One, an online storage service by Canonical Ltd.

== Other uses ==
- One (Enneagram), a personality type
- Purina One, a line of pet food products
- ONE Bank, a commercial bank in Bangladesh
- One (sixth form college), a college in Ipswich, England
- ONE Championship, a mixed martial arts organization founded in Singapore in 2011

== See also ==
- -one, a suffix used in organic chemistry to denote the -C(=O)- group
- Ones (disambiguation)
- Oneness (disambiguation)
- The One (disambiguation)
- L'One, a stage name for Georgian-Russian rapper, singer, and songwriter Levan Emzarovich Gorozia
- Number One (disambiguation), also spelled "No. 1" or "#1"
- Year One (disambiguation)
- One percent (disambiguation)
- First (disambiguation)
- 01 (disambiguation)
- +1 (disambiguation)
- -1 (disambiguation)
- I (disambiguation)
- Uno (disambiguation)
