= Divine unity =

In Monotheism, Divine unity is God's attribute of Oneness and may refer to:

- Unitarianism, the belief that God is one person.
- the nature of God in Oneness Pentecostalism.
- "oneness of God" (tawhid), an Islamic doctrine the rejecting the Trinity
- the oneness of God, one of the three core assertions of the Baháʼí teachings#Unity
- Divine simplicity, the belief that God is without distinguishable parts, characteristics or features (is "one").
