= Year One (disambiguation) =

Year One in political history usually refers to the institution of radical, revolutionary change.

Year One or Year 1 may also refer to:

- 0s, a year
- 1 BC, a year
- Year 1 (education), an educational year group in schools
- Year One (film), a 2009 American adventure comedy
- Anno uno, a 1974 Italian biographical film released internationally as Year One
- Batman: Year One, a DC Comics story arc
  - Batman: Year One (film), a 2011 animated film based on the story arc
- Robin: Year One, another DC Comics story arc
- Batgirl: Year One, a 2003 DC Comics comic book miniseries
- Two-Face: Year One, a 2008 DC Comics two-part miniseries
- Green Arrow: Year One, a 2007 DC Comics limited series
- Superman: Year One, a 2019 DC Comics limited series published under the DC Black Label
- Gotham City: Year One, a 2022 DC Comics limited series also published in the DC Black Label
- Ryan Caulfield: Year One, a 1999 American television series
- A Vampyre Story: Year One, an adventure game under development
- Year One (album), 1969 album by rock group, The Golden Gate

== See also ==
- Year Zero (disambiguation)
- The Year Is One, 2001 album by Comes with the Fall
- Lovers in the Year One, 1973 Czechoslovak drama film
- One Year, 1971 album by Colin Blunstone
- One Year Later (disambiguation)
- New Year (disambiguation)
- One (disambiguation)
