= Plus One =

Plus One may refer to:

== Arts, entertainment, and media ==
- Plus One (2008 film), a Russian comedy film
- Plus One (2019 film), an American romantic comedy film
- Plus One (band), a Christian pop band
  - Plus One: The Home Video, 2001
- Plus One (DJ), one member of Jack Beats, an English electronic-music duo from London
- Plus One (TV series), a British sitcom
- "Plus One" (Call Me Kat), a 2021 television episode
- "Plus One" (Drifters), a 2015 television episode
- "Plus One" (The X-Files), a 2018 television episode

== Other uses ==
- Acorn Plus 1, an expansion for the Acorn Electron home computer
- Plus-One system, a suggested change to the college football championship format in the United States

== See also ==
- +1 (disambiguation)
- OnePlus, a Chinese smartphone manufacturer
- PLOS One, a scientific journal
- TV One Plus 1, a time-shifted repeat of the New Zealand channel TV One
