= −2 =

Negative integer two units from the origin in mathematics

| ← −3 | −2 | −1 → |
- −1 0 1 2 3 4 5 6 7 8 9 →: List of numbers; Integers
- Cardinal: −2, minus two, negative two
- Ordinal: −2nd (negative second)
- Divisors: 1, 2
- Arabic: −٢
- Chinese numeral: 负二，负弍，负貳
- Bengali: −২
Binary (byte)
| S&M: | 100000010_{2} |
| 2sC: | 11111110_{2} |
Hex (byte)
| S&M: | 0x102_{16} |
| 2sC: | 0xFE_{16} |

In mathematics, negative two or minus two is an integer two units from the origin, denoted as −2 or ^{−}2. It is the additive inverse of 2, following −3 and preceding −1, and is the largest negative even integer. Except in rare cases exploring integral ring prime elements, negative two is generally not considered a prime number.

Negative two is sometimes used to denote the square reciprocal in the notation of SI base units, such as m·s^{−2}. Additionally, in fields like software design, −1 is often used as an invalid return value for functions, and similarly, negative two may indicate other invalid conditions beyond negative one. For example, in the On-Line Encyclopedia of Integer Sequences, negative one denotes non-existence, while negative two indicates an infinite solution.

== Properties ==
- Negative two is a complementary Bell number (also known as Rao Uppuluri-Carpenter numbers), and a Hermite number.
- Negative two makes the class number of the quadratic field $\mathbb{Q}[\sqrt{d}]$ equal to 1, meaning its ring of integers is a unique factorization domain. (Note: When $d<0$, if the ring of integers of $\mathbb{Q}[\sqrt{d}]$ is a unique factorization domain, all numbers in $\mathbb{Q}[\sqrt{d}]$ have a unique factorization. For example, $\mathbb{Q}[\sqrt{-5}]$ is not, as 6 can be factored in two ways in $\mathbb{Z}[\sqrt{-5}]$: $2\times 3$ and $(1+\sqrt{-5})(1-\sqrt{-5})$.) According to the Stark–Heegner theorem, only nine negative numbers have this property, corresponding to Heegner numbers.
  - Negative two also makes the quadratic field $\mathbb{Q}[\sqrt{d}]$ a simple Euclidean field (or norm-Euclidean field). Only five negative numbers have this property: −11, −7, −3, −2, −1. If relaxed, −15 is included.
- Negative two is the largest negative integer unreachable from 1 in two steps using addition, subtraction, or multiplication. The largest in one step is −1, and in three steps, −4. This relates to the straight-line program combined with addition, subtraction, and multiplication, exploring the algebraic complexity of integers in relation to NP = P.
- Negative two is the second-order Hermite number, i.e. $H_2 = H_2(0) = -2$.
- Negative two makes $k(k+1)(k+2)$ a triangular number. Only nine integers have this property, with negative two being the smallest: −2, −1, 0, 1, 4, 5, 9, 56, and 636.

=== Divisors of negative two ===
The divisors of negative two, including negative divisors, are identical to those of two: −2, −1, 1, 2. By definition, negative numbers are not typically subjected to prime factorization, though $-1$ can be factored out as $-1 \times 2$, making 2 a prime factor but not the result of prime factorization. As a Gaussian integer, negative two can be factored as $i \times (1+i)^2$, where $1+i$ is a Gaussian prime and $i$ is the imaginary unit.

=== Powers of negative two ===
The first few powers of negative two are −2, 4, −8, 16, −32, 64, −128, oscillating between positive and negative. The positive terms are powers of four, and the negative terms differ from powers of four by a factor of negative two. This property makes negative two the largest negative number that can represent all real numbers as a base without using a negative sign or two's complement. In 1957, some computers used a base-negative-two numeral system for calculations. Similarly, using $2i$ can represent complex numbers.

The sum of the powers of negative two is a divergent geometric series. Although divergent, its generalized sum is $\frac{1}{3}$.

$$\sum_{k=0}^{n} (-2)^k = 1 - 2 + 4 - 8 + \dots$$

Using the geometric series formula,

$$\sum_{k=0}^\infty a r^k = \frac{a}{1-r}$$

with the first term $a=1$ and common ratio $r=-2$, the result is $\frac{1}{3}$. However, the series is divergent, with partial sums:

1, −1, 3, −5, 11, −21, 43, −85, 171, −341...

Though divergent, Euler assigned the value $\frac{1}{3}$ to this series, known as Euler summation.

=== Negative second power ===
The negative second power of a number is its square reciprocal, applicable to functions as well. In daily life, it is occasionally used to denote units without a division sign, such as acceleration, typically written as m/s^{2} but also as m·s^{−2} in SI notation.

Common topics related to the square reciprocal include: for any real number $n$, its square reciprocal $n^{-2}$ is always positive; the inverse-square law; grid turbulence decay; and the Basel problem. The Basel problem states that the sum of the square reciprocals of natural numbers converges to $\frac{\pi^2}{6}$:

$$\sum^{\infin}_{n=1} {n^{-2}} = {1^{-2} }+{2^{-2} }+{3^{-2} }+\cdots = {1 \over 1^2 }+{1 \over 2^2 }+{1 \over 3^2 }+\cdots = { \pi^2 \over 6 }$$

This value equals the Riemann zeta function at 2.

For any real number, the square reciprocal is positive. For negative two, it is $\frac{1}{4}$. The square reciprocals of the first few natural numbers are:

| Square reciprocal | 1 | 2 | 3 | 4 | 5 | 6 | 7 | 8 | 9 | 10 |
|---|---|---|---|---|---|---|---|---|---|---|
| $x^{-2}$ | 1 | $\frac{1}{4}$ | $\frac{1}{9}$ | $\frac{1}{16}$ | $\frac{1}{25}$ | $\frac{1}{36}$ | $\frac{1}{49}$ | $\frac{1}{64}$ | $\frac{1}{81}$ | $\frac{1}{100}$ |
| $x^{-2}$ | 1 | 0.25 | $0.\overline{1}$ | 0.0625 | 0.04 | $0.0\overline{27}$ | 0.0204081632... (Note: The repeating decimal for 7's square reciprocal has a period of 42: 0.0204081632 6530612244 8979591836 7346938775 51... See reciprocal of 49.) | 0.015625 | $0.\overline{012345679}$ | 0.01 |

=== Square root of negative two ===
The square root of negative two, defined with the imaginary unit $i$ satisfying $i^2 = -1$, is derived from $\sqrt{-x} = \pm i \sqrt{x}$. For negative two, it is $\sqrt{-2} = \pm i \sqrt{2}$. (Note: In the bi-imaginary number system $\left\langle\sqrt{R},Z_R\right\rangle$, where $R$ is negative two and $Z_R$ is two, it is $\left\langle\pm \mathrm i \sqrt{2},Z_2\right\rangle$. Donald E. Knuth (April 1, 1960). "A imaginary number system" [A imaginary number system]. Communications of the ACM. 3 (4): 245–247. doi:10.1145/367177.367233.) The principal value is $\sqrt{-2} = i \sqrt{2}$. (Note: The principal value of the square root of –2 is $\sqrt{-x} = \pm i \sqrt{x}$ taking the positive value; with respect to –2, that is $\sqrt{-2} = i \sqrt{2}$.)

== Representation ==
Negative two is typically represented by adding a negative sign before 2, commonly called "negative two" or "minus two" in English.

In binary, especially in computing, negative numbers are often represented using two's complement. Negative two is represented as "...11111110_{(2)}", specifically "1110_{(2)}" for 4-bit, "11111110_{(2)}" for 8-bit, and "1111111111111110_{(2)}" for 16-bit integers. In signed notation, it is "−10_{(2)}".

== Plus or minus two ==
Plus or minus two ($\pm 2$) is expressed using the plus-minus sign, representing both positive and negative two. It denotes the square roots of 4 or the solutions to the quadratic equation $x^2 = 4$, i.e., $\sqrt{4} = \pm{2}$. Plus or minus two appears more frequently in cultural contexts, such as music compositions or the documentary ±2 °C, which explores the environmental impact of a global temperature change of two degrees.

== See also ==
- 2
