= Red Table Talk =

Television program

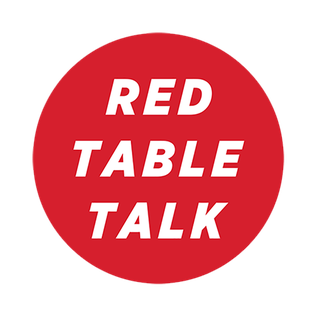
- Genre: Talk show
- Presented by: Jada Pinkett Smith; Willow Smith; Adrienne Banfield-Norris
- Country of origin: United States
- Original language: English
- No. of seasons: 5
- No. of episodes: 129

Production
- Executive producers: Jada Pinkett Smith; Ellen Rakieten; Miguel Melendez; Meghan Hoffman; Gennifer Gardiner; Todd Yasui
- Producer: Lisa Wilson
- Cinematography: Adrian Pruett
- Editors: John Schimke; Patrick Fraser; John French; David Milhous; Eric Tome
- Running time: 16–27 minutes
- Production companies: Westbrook Studios; Very Tall Productions

Original release
- Network: Facebook Watch (2018–2022)
- Release: May 7, 2018 – December 19, 2022

Red Table Talk is an American talk show web series starring Jada Pinkett Smith, Willow Smith, and Jada's mother, Adrienne Banfield-Norris. The series premiered on May 7, 2018 on Facebook Watch, and would run for 5 seasons and 129 episodes on the streaming service. The series also spawned a spinoff, Red Table Talk: The Estefans, led by Gloria Estefan, Emily Estefan and Lili Estefan. Facebook Watch ended the series run in April 2023 as part of the cancellation of all TV shows of original programming on Facebook Watch, although Red Table Talk producers, Westbrook Studios, will continue the project and are reportedly seeking a new home for the series, which was originally slated to return in 2024.

Red Table Talk provides "a forum where the perspectives of three different generations on a wide variety of topics are shared."

== Production ==
On January 18, 2018, it was announced that Facebook had given the production a series order. The series was expected to star Jada Pinkett Smith, Willow Smith, and Adrienne Banfield-Norris. Pinkett Smith was also set as an executive producer alongside Ellen Rakieten and Miguel Melendez. It was expected the show would premiere in April 2018.

On April 23, 2018, it was announced that the show would premiere on May 7, 2018. On June 13, 2018, it was announced that Facebook had ordered an additional 13 episodes of the series bringing the first season total up to 23. The additional episodes were expected to premiere in the fall of 2018. Facebook renewed the show for a second season of at least 20 episodes, to premiere in May 2019. Season 2 premiered on May 6, 2019 and is reported to have 20 episodes.

The show launched an overall deal with IHeartMedia to launch a podcast radio network.

On April 26, 2023, it was reported that Red Table Talk was being cancelled by Facebook Watch. The cancellation was related to the discontinuation of all original programming by Facebook Watch; a shift of emphasis by parent company Meta Platforms toward content for its virtual reality service Horizon Worlds; and ongoing layoffs at Meta that included the departure of Mina Lefevre, Facebook Watch's head of development and programming. The reports also indicated that Westbrook Studios, the producer of Red Table Talk, is seeking a new distributor for future episodes of the series.

== Episodes ==
Seasons of Red Table Talk
Season	Episodes	Originally released	
Season	Episodes	First released	Last released
1	27	May 7, 2018	March 1, 2019
2	23	May 6, 2019	December 16, 2019
3	26	February 26, 2020	December 29, 2020
4	27	March 31, 2021	December 22, 2021
5	26	April 20, 2022	December 19, 2022

=== Season 1 (2018–19) ===
Red Table Talk, season 1 episodes
No. overall	No. in season	Title	Featured guest	Original release date
1	1	"Motherhood"	Sheree Fletcher	May 7, 2018
In the premiere episode of Red Table Talk, Jada Pinkett Smith is joined by Will Smith's ex-wife Sheree Fletcher for an intimate conversation about their blended family.
2	2	"Surviving Loss"	N/A	May 14, 2018
This week around the Red Table, Jada reveals the impact of the tragic death of her longtime best friend Tupac Shakur, and Willow shares a painful secret for the first time.
3	3	"Body Confessions! Jada Tells All at the Table"	N/A	May 21, 2018
At the Red Table this week, Jada, Willow, and Adrienne get real about body insecurities and explain why every single body is beautiful in its own way.
4	4	"Girls Trippin' with Gabrielle Union"	Gabrielle Union	May 28, 2018
Jada and Gabrielle Union have an open discussion about the ups and downs of friendship and the power of sisterhood.
5	5	"Growing Up Smith!"	Jaden Smith	June 4, 2018
Jaden and Willow Smith reveal what it's like growing up in one of the most famous families in America; Adrienne wonders if the kids' parents Will and Jada might have granted them too much independence too soon.
6	6	"Let's Talk About Sex!"	Telana Lynum	June 11, 2018
Jada reveals everything from losing her virginity to embracing abstinence, to her addiction to sex toys; Willow shares how she first learned about sex; and Adrienne explains how her introduction to sex created shame in her life.
7	7	"EJ & Cookie Johnson: Daring to be Different"	Cookie Johnson & EJ Johnson	June 18, 2018
E.J. Johnson brings his mother Cookie to the Red Table for a colorful discussion about gender fluidity, individuality, and fashion. He and Willow explain how their generation has very different ideas about gender stereotypes, and how they stay true to themselves in the face of societal expectations.
8	8	"Tiffany Haddish in the House!"	Tiffany Haddish	June 25, 2018
Comedian Tiffany Haddish is the breakout star of the year. Jada invites her Girls Trip co-star and friend over to talk about her sudden rise to fame, unexpected encounters with celebrities, and her favorite male body part.
9	9	"Cesar Millan: From Illegal Immigrant to American Dream"	Cesar Millan	July 2, 2018
Jada invites her longtime friend Cesar Millan, the world-renowned "Dog Whisperer," for a conversation about his remarkable journey to America. From his harrowing attempts to cross the border as an illegal immigrant to his international TV stardom, Cesar tells all.
10	10	"Facing Addiction: Jada & Adrienne Share Their Family's Story"	August Alsina & Ashley Marie	July 9, 2018
For the first time ever, Jada's mom Adrienne shares details of her 20-year heroin addiction and how it affected a young Jada. Also joining the family are special guest August Alsina and Will's youngest sister Ashley Marie, both of whom have faced addiction.
11	11	"Becoming Mr. & Mrs. Smith (Part 1)"	Will Smith	October 22, 2018
Will and Jada reveal the truth behind their relationship, from the day they met to the moments of crisis in their 20-plus-year marriage.
12	12	"Our Unique Union (Part 2)"	Will Smith	October 29, 2018
Will returns to the Table to describe the breaking point in his marriage to Jada, and how the couple have redefined the definition of "husband" and "wife" to fit their unique union.
13	13	"Leah Remini: Setting the Record Straight"	Leah Remini	November 5, 2018
After years of not speaking, Jada meets Leah Remini at the Table to discuss their very public dispute over Leah's accusations that Jada and Will are Scientologists.
14	14	"The Racial Divide: Women of Color & White Women"	Jane Elliott	November 12, 2018
The tough topic of race relations between women is brought to the Red Table with famed diversity educator Jane Elliott.
15	15	"Domestic Abuse: When Love Turns Violent"	Crystal & Selena	November 19, 2018
Heartbreaking stories of domestic abuse are revealed when Adrienne shares her traumatic experiences at the hands of Jada's father, the life-threatening event that finally made her leave him, and the effect it had on Jada; Willow sits down with a 14-year-old girl who witnessed her mother's abuse.
16	16	"Surviving Divorce with Toni Braxton"	Toni Braxton	November 26, 2018
Jada invites good friend Toni Braxton to the Red Table to talk about her public and painful divorce. Toni reveals the real reason her marriage ended, and Adrienne shares what she's learned from each of her three divorces.
17	17	"Learning to Forgive"	Caleeb Pinkett	December 3, 2018
Jada and her younger brother Caleeb share their deeply personal experience of struggling to forgive the man who hurt them the most: their father.
18	18	"Interracial Marriage with Ellen Pompeo"	Ellen Pompeo	December 10, 2018
Grey's Anatomy star Ellen Pompeo opens up about her interracial marriage and the challenges of raising bi-racial children.
19	19	"Confronting Mental Illness"	Kid Cudi	December 17, 2018
Jada reveals her struggles with depression and suicidal thoughts. Grammy-winning rapper Kid Cudi joins the Table to talk about his mental-health problems and battle with addiction.
20	20	"Christmas with the Smiths"	N/A	December 24, 2018
Jada, Willow, and Adrienne celebrates Christmas at the Red Table.
21	21	"Red Table Workout"	Whitney Simmons & Brittne Babe	December 31, 2018
Jada, Adrienne, and Willow reveal their secrets to staying in shape mentally and physically; plus they share tips on how to be happier in the New Year.
22	22	"Surviving R. Kelly: The Aftermath (Part 1)"	Lisa Van Allen	December 31, 2018
Jada, Adrienne, and Willow sit down with R. Kelly accuser Lisa Van Allen as she shares details of her decade-long ordeal with the singer.
23	23	"Surviving R. Kelly: An Accuser's Daughter Speaks Out (Pt. 2)"	Akeyla Van Allen & Candice Norcott	December 31, 2018
Lisa Van Allen's teenage daughter Akeyla speaks publicly for the first time about her mom's alleged 10-year abusive relationship with R. Kelly; psychologist Dr. Candice Norcott tells how abusers manipulate their victims.
24	24	"Black and Gay in America with Don Lemon"	Don Lemon	January 11, 2019
The Red Table makes a special trip to New York for an exclusive interview with CNN anchor Don Lemon about the horrific hate crime against Empire actor Jussie Smollett. Lemon reveals the obstacles he faced as a gay Black man in a high-profile job and the challenges facing gay men in the African American community.
25	25	"Unpacking White Privilege and Prejudice"	Justina Machado, Rachel Elizabeth Cargle & Amie Newman	January 18, 2019
Three women from diverse backgrounds join the Red Table to discuss the concept of white privilege and how it affects the relationships between white women and women of color.
26	26	"What Men Really Think About Love"	Wale & Justin Baldoni	January 25, 2019
Award-winning rapper Wale and Jane the Virgin star Justin Baldoni come to the Red Table for a vulnerable, eye-opening, and honest conversation about what men want and need in the search for true love.
27	27	"Jordyn Woods Shares the Truth"	Jordyn Woods	March 1, 2019
Jordyn Woods comes to The Red Table for an emotional first interview about the public scandal involving NBA Star Tristan Thompson, the father of Khloe Kardashian's daughter. She addresses the rumors and accusations. What really happened that night? It's an RTT exclusive.

=== Season 2 (2019) ===
Red Table Talk, season 2 episodes
No. overall	No. in season	Title	Featured guest	Original release date
28	1	"First Ladies of the NBA: Meet the Curry’s"	Ayesha Curry, Sonya Curry, Sydel Curry-Lee & Callie Rivers	May 6, 2019
It's a Red Table Road Trip. Jada, Gammy, and Willow travel to North Carolina to the private home of NBA Royalty to meet the Queens of the Curry Dynasty. It's Real Talk with REAL NBA wives.
29	2	"Molested as a Young Boy: An NBA Star Breaks His Silence"	Keyon Dooling	May 13, 2019
Former NBA player Keyon Dooling is one of the few brave men to come forward with his story of childhood abuse, and how keeping it a secret for years drove him to a mental institution.
30	3	"Does Porn Ruin Relationships?"	Garrett Jonsson & Arial Jonsson	May 20, 2019
Jada, Willow, and Adrienne engage in a frank discussion on the effects of pornography.
31	4	"The Roadblocks Between You and Love"	Jay Shetty & Radhi Shetty	May 27, 2019
Jada, Gammy, and Willow are at the Table to discuss how fear, ego, and insecurity can get in the way of unconditional love. Then they are joined by former monk-turned-Internet sensation Jay Shetty and his wife Radhi, who share their secrets to a happy marriage.
32	5	"Ciara: Healing the Emotional Scars"	Ciara	June 3, 2019
Ciara comes to the Red Table to reveal how she turned her "scars" into "beauty marks", and discusses her journey from pain and mistrust to her loving marriage to NFL star Russell Wilson.
33	6	"Infidelity: Can Your Relationship Survive?"	Esther Perel	June 10, 2019
Jada and Gammy reveal how the infidelities in their lives shaped their views of marriage. Then world-renowned couples therapist Esther Perel comes to the Table to share how she's helped couples overcome infidelity.
34	7	"Common: Breaking Destructive Cycles"	Common	June 17, 2019
After years of success as a rapper and actor, Common found himself stuck in a cycle of failed relationships - both romantic and familial. He comes to the Red Table to discuss his book "Let Love Have The Last Word" and share how he finally broke through the destructive cycles.
35	8	"Unconventional Relationships: Can Multiple Partners Work?"	N/A	June 24, 2019
Jada, Gammy, and Willow explore alternatives to conventional marriage as they meet a "throuple": two women and a man in a three-way romantic relationship; Jada and Willow embarrass Gammy by revealing their thoughts about multiple partner scenarios.
36	9	"Children Forced Into Marriage: A National Disgrace"	N/A	July 1, 2019
In 48 states it's still legal for young girls to be forced into marriage. Two brave women who were child brides share the harrowing details of how they were forced to marry older men and why the laws absolutely must change.
37	10	"Should White People Adopt Black Children"	Kristin Davis	July 8, 2019
RTT takes on the controversial topic of interracial adoption. Jada and Gammy are joined by Sex and the City's Kristin Davis, a mother of two adopted Black children, who's been forced to confront her own white privilege after seeing how differently her own kids have been treated.
38	11	"Will Smith's Emergency Family Meeting"	Will Smith, Jaden Smith, Trey Smith	September 23, 2019
For the first time ever, the entire Smith family is at the Red Table as Will surprises Jada by calling an emergency family meeting. Intimate family secrets are revealed as Will shares his private struggles with the RTT Community.
39	12	"Chelsea Handler Confronts White Privilege"	Chelsea Handler	September 30, 2019
Chelsea Handler comes to the table to reveal eye-opening truths about her past and confront her own white privilege.
40	13	"Living Your Truth: A Transgender Pastor Speaks Out"	Paula Williams	October 7, 2019
Jada, Willow, and Gammy sit down with Pastor Paula Williams, a transgender woman who risked her job, family, and friendships in order to live her truth.
41	14	"Alicia Keys: Uncensored"	Alicia Keys	October 14, 2019
Grammy winner Alicia Keys joins Jada for a very special episode of Red Table. From her personal struggles and insecurities to revelations about her marriage and true stories behind some of her biggest songs, the usually private Alicia Keys is uncensored and revealing like never before.
42	15	"Raised by White Parents: A Black Adoptee Speaks"	Angela Tucker	October 21, 2019
Jada, Willow, and Gammy sit down with Angela Tucker, a Black woman who was raised by white parents, to discuss the struggles of transracial adoptees.
43	16	"The Narcissism Epidemic"	Ramani Durvasula	October 28, 2019
Where do you fall on the narcissism scale? Renowned psychologist Dr. Ramani Durvasula sits down with Jada, Willow and Gammy for a revealing discussion around self-obsession, and explains how to both identify and manage the narcissists in your life.
44	17	"Demi Moore and Her Daughters"	Demi Moore, Rumer Willis & Tallulah Willis	November 4, 2019
For the first time, Demi Moore and daughters Rumer and Tallulah Willis come to the Table to share intimate details about Demi’s best-selling memoir “Inside Out,” the difficulties of their traumatic mother-daughter relationship, Demi’s life-threatening addiction, the men in her life, and why their family didn’t speak for three years.
45	18	"Surviving Addiction: A Path to Healing"	Tommy Davidson	November 11, 2019
Jada and Gammy are joined by comedian and family friend Tommy Davidson to discuss his experiences of racism, abuse, and addiction. From being abandoned as an infant to learning how to overcome the pain of his past, Tommy comes to the Table to share his story.
46	19	"Loving and Losing Whitney Houston: Robyn Crawford Speaks Out"	Robyn Crawford	November 18, 2019
Whitney Houston’s close friend and confidante Robyn Crawford breaks her silence, revealing the closely-guarded truth about their friendship, their romance, and her volatile marriage.
47	20	"Rapper T.I. and His Wife Tiny Set The Record Straight"	T.I. & Tameka "Tiny" Harris	November 25, 2019
Rapper and actor T.I. comes to the Table with his wife Tiny to address the controversy around him taking his daughter to the gynecologist to make sure that she’s still a virgin.
48	21	"T.I. and Tiny: Back from the Brink of Divorce (Part 2)"	T.I. & Tameka "Tiny" Harris	December 2, 2019
T.I. and his wife Tiny are back at the Red Table to share the ups and downs of their marriage, including public controversies, prison, infidelity, and filing for divorce.
49	22	"Ask Us Anything"	N/A	December 10, 2019
We’re turning the Table! Jada, Willow, and Gammy answer your burning questions about marriage, rumors, and blending families. Plus, an update from Jordyn Woods’ Red Table Talk.
50	23	"Smith Family Medical Results Revealed"	Mark Hyman, Will Smith, Jaden Smith	December 16, 2019
After undergoing medical testing as a family, the Smiths receive their test results – including a big surprise for one family member. Plus, world-renowned Doctor Mark Hyman shares what you should eat to turn your health around now.

=== Season 3 (2020) ===
Red Table Talk, season 3 episodes
No. overall	No. in season	Title	Featured guest	Original release date
51	1	"What Snoop Dogg Wants Everyone to Know"	Snoop Dogg	February 26, 2020
Entertainment Icon Snoop Dogg comes to the Table for a healing talk about the controversial statements he made about Gayle King, what led to his apology, and what he’s learned since.
52	2	"What You Need to Know About Coronavirus"	Will Smith & Trey Smith	March 18, 2020
Jada and Will hold a special family Red Table Talk to get straight factual answers to their questions, and yours, about the Coronavirus pandemic.
53	3	"Managing Our Anxiety & Fear During COVID-19"	Jay Shetty & Ramani Durvasula	March 25, 2020
In this challenging time, motivational speaker Jay Shetty and psychologist Dr. Ramani come to the Red Table with tips and tools for managing the emotional toll that COVID-19 has created. (This episode was filmed prior to the enactment of the current COVID-19 guidelines by the California Governor and similar guidelines enacted in other states).
54	4	"Coping with Addiction During Coronavirus"	Mike Dow	April 8, 2020
For millions of Americans struggling with addiction, the Coronavirus presents new challenges. Gammy shares her own battles, and the family welcomes specialist Dr. Mike Dow to help answer your addiction questions.
55	5	"A Girls Trip Coronavirus Quarantine Reunion"	Regina Hall, Tiffany Haddish & Queen Latifah	April 15, 2020
Jada is joined by her Girls Trip co-stars: Regina Hall, Tiffany Haddish, and Queen Latifah for a laugh-filled reunion which will not disappoint. In tough times you just need to laugh with your BFFs.
56	6	"How Your Relationship Can Survive Quarantine"	Michaela Boehm, John Gray & Aventer Gray	April 29, 2020
Is Coronavirus putting a strain on your relationship? Renowned intimacy expert, and personal counselor to Jada and Will, Michaela Boehm comes to the table with practical tools to help your relationship last. Plus, famed John Gray Ministries and his wife Aventer Gray share how isolation has them questioning their marriage and family dynamic.
57	7	"Mother's Day Surprises for Coronavirus Heroes"	Sandra Bullock & Tamela Mann	May 8, 2020
This Mother's Day is a difficult one for many dealing with quarantine, social distancing, and loss. Red Table Talk is honoring mothers who are on the front lines of the fight against coronavirus with help from celebrity friends Sandra Bullock and Gospel singer Tamela Mann. Let the surprises begin.
58	8	"Colorism: Why Black People Discriminate Against Each Other"	Mia Pitts & Madison Miles	May 27, 2020
Jada, Gammy, and Willow tackle Colorism, a rarely-discussed form of discrimination that continues to divide the Black community. Learn why this hateful bias entered into Black culture years ago, and meet Jada's lifelong friend Mia and daughter Madison, who reveal how they've been targets of bias themselves.
59	9	"How Gun Violence Affects Women"	Lauren London, Erica Ford, Rain Stippec & Dani Robinson	June 3, 2020
Jada sits down for a special one-on-one conversation with Lauren London, longtime partner of the late Nipsey Hussle, to talk about the traumas of gun violence and coping with grief and loss.
60	10	"Black America In Crisis"	Angela Davis & Tamika Mallory	June 19, 2020
Jada, Gammy, and Willow address the state of emergency within Black America - from racism to police brutality, white supremacy to "Karens", and even cancel culture. Joining this special RTT: Legendary Civil Rights leader Dr. Angela Davis and the woman who gave the most powerful speech of this generation: activist Tamika Mallory.
61	11	"Jada and Will: Their First One-On-One Conversation"	Will Smith, Jaden Smith & Trey Smith	June 21, 2020
On this special Father's Day episode, Jada sits down with Will for one of the most intimate and vulnerable conversations the couple has ever shared. Will and Jada reflect on their 23 years of parenting, including the lessons they've learned, the failures they've overcome, and how Will's divorce from his first wife shaped his approach as a father and husband. Plus, never-before-seen Smith family home videos and Father's Day surprises from Willow, Jaden, and Trey.
62	12	"Jada Brings Herself to the Table"	Will Smith	July 10, 2020
Jada and Will address the recent headlines and share their journey of finding peace through pain.
63	13	"Life Changing Lessons with Brené Brown"	Brené Brown	September 28, 2020
Are you struggling with shame, guilt, fear, or self-doubt? World-renowned expert Brené Brown joins the table to help. Willow admits what being shamed by her parents felt like, and Jada has a revelation about her codependency.
64	14	"Fed Up and Fired Up: Ice Cube’s Bold Plan for Black America"	Ice Cube	October 6, 2020
Rapper and movie star Ice Cube has had enough. Cube reveals his groundbreaking "Contract With Black America" and the changes he believes are necessary to properly address racial inequality for Black Americans.
65	15	"Mom Shaming: The New Epidemic"	Jessica Alba & Ashley Graham	October 13, 2020
Jessica Alba and Ashley Graham come to the Table to share their experiences as frequent targets of mom shaming. Jada shares her own stories of being mom-shamed, and Willow reveals how that affected her.
66	16	"Sexual Consent: What Every Woman Should Know"	Amber Rose, Rumer Willis & DeAndre Levy	October 20, 2020
Amber Rose, Rumer Willis, and DeAndre Levy come to the Table to share their own experiences with sexual consent. When you don't say yes, but don't say no, who's at fault? Everyone shares their opinions on the next RTT.
67	17	"Why Are Women Mean to Each Other?"	Jemele Hill & Cari Champion	October 27, 2020
Former rivals and sports journalists Jemele Hill and Cari Champion come to the Table to discuss why Black women often don't support each other, and how difficult mother-daughter relationships can lead to toxic female friendships.
68	18	"Secret Struggles of “The Most Controversial Person on the Internet”"	Jameela Jamil	November 13, 2020
In a provocative and unfiltered conversation, outspoken actress Jameela Jamil reveals the secret struggles she's faced and how her most shocking behavior radically saved her life, helped her heal, and made her an unlikely inspiration.
69	19	"Breaking Family Cycles with Matthew McConaughey"	Matthew McConaughey	November 17, 2020
Oscar winner and bestselling author Matthew McConaughey comes to the Table with his mother for an exclusive, intimate conversation about his childhood and career, followed by a big surprise for Matthew: a reunion 30 years in the making.
70	20	"Will Smith’s Red Table Takeover: Resolving Conflict"	Will Smith, Janet Hubert, & Ramani Durvasula	November 20, 2020
Join Will for a special Red Table Takeover when he sits down for an emotional conversation with Janet Hubert, the original Aunt Viv of The Fresh Prince of Bel-Air, to resolve their bitter 30-year-long feud.
71	21	"Red Table Recipes: Cooking for the Holidays"	Will Smith, Sheree Zampino, Tabitha Brown, & Joshuah Nishi	November 24, 2020
Jada, Willow, and Gammy are joined by Will's first wife Sheree Zampino, who reveals the secrets behind one of her famous recipes and gives tips on how other blended families can spend the holidays together.
72	22	"Red Table Transformations"	N/A	December 1, 2020
Six people who have lost a combined 1,000 pounds come to the Table to show how they did it - and how you can too. Plus, Willow reveals a major way she's transformed in 2020 and how she conquered her insecurities.
73	23	"Olivia Jade Speaks Out"	Olivia Jade Giannulli	December 8, 2020
In this RTT exclusive, Olivia Jade, younger daughter of Full House actress Lori Loughlin and designer Mossimo Giannulli, breaks her silence on the college-admissions scandal that rocked the nation and landed her famous parents in prison.
74	24	"How to Heal a Broken Heart"	Michaela Boehm	December 15, 2020
Jada and Will's personal relationship counselor, Michaela Boehm, comes to the Table with powerful advice on coping with betrayal, rejection, and tragedy, and why continuing to believe in love is important.
75	25	"Suicide Attempt Survivors Speak Out"	N/A	December 22, 2020
Jada, Willow, and Gammy are joined by emotional and inspiring suicide-attempt survivors who have powerful messages for those struggling with mental health during this challenging time.
76	26	"How to Handle #Awkward Conversations"	Kym Whitley & Philip Galanes	December 29, 2020
Do you need help working through an awkward situation? Comedian Kym Whitley and New York Times advice columnist Philip Galanes come to the Table to solve your most-awkward social dilemmas.

=== Season 4 (2021) ===
Red Table Talk, season 4 episodes
No. overall	No. in season	Title	Featured guest	Original release date
77	1	"“I'd Never Been With a Woman Before!” Niecy Nash Sets the Record Straight"	Niecy Nash & Jessica Betts	March 31, 2021
In this interview with her new wife Jessica, Niecy Nash reveals how she went from two marriages to men to falling in love with a woman. The newlyweds set the record straight about their relationship and how they fell in love.
78	2	"Secrets to Surviving a Narcissist in Your Life"	Ramani Durvasula	April 7, 2021
We all know a narcissist: it could be your spouse, friend, boss, or parent. Renowned psychologist Dr. Ramani offers a rare look inside the minds of narcissists and behavior that is often at the root of many abusive relationships.
79	3	"An Urgent Warning from Bobby Brown"	Bobby Brown & Alicia Etheredge-Brown	April 14, 2021
Bobby Brown, Grammy winner and "Bad Boy of R&B", comes to the Table with his wife Alicia to open up about the addictions and controversies that have followed him for decades.
80	4	"Is Polyamory for You?"	N/A	April 28, 2021
Willow opens up about her decision to practice ethical non-monogamy; Poly Solo Gabrielle Smith and her married boyfriend Alex come to the Table to reveal how their multiple-partner approach to relationships works.
81	5	"Willow’s Mother’s Day Surprise"	Shirley Caesar & Wicked Wisdom	May 5, 2021
Willow pulls off a top-secret Mother's Day gift for Jada when the Red Table salutes amazing moms, plus a special performance by The Queen of Gospel Music, Shirley Caesar. Grab your tissues for our annual RTT Mother's Day special.
82	6	"The Invisible Black Women Epidemic"	Tressie McMillan Cottom, Tamika Mallory, Ramani Durvasula & Candice Norcott	May 13, 2021
It's a rarely-talke-dabout type of racism. Tamika Mallory reveals how the experience of feeling invisible led to her struggle with addiction. Plus: Gammy shares the troubling way she was treated by doctors while she was pregnant with Jada.
83	7	"Confronting The Divide Between Black and Asian Americans"	Michael Eric Dyson, Min Jin Lee & Lisa Ling	May 19, 2021
Deeply-rooted tensions between Black and Asian American communities have existed for years, yet are rarely talked about. Journalist Lisa Ling and scholar Dr. Michael Eric Dyson explain the origins of this complicated relationship.
84	8	"Red Table Tattoos with Dr. Woo"	Brian Woo	May 26, 2021
Jada takes Gammy and Willow on a special field trip for a magical bucket-list surprise. During this ink session, the notoriously private Dr. Woo opens up about his Chinese-American roots and how he talks to his young children about racism.
85	9	"Kelly Osbourne Comes Clean"	Kelly Osbourne	June 2, 2021
Kelly Osbourne, who recently relapsed after four years of sobriety, comes to the Table to reveal how one drink turned into multiple bottles, the moment she realized she was in trouble, and the high price of her addiction.
86	10	"Meet Our Wellness Queen"	Queen Afua	June 9, 2021
Jada's world-renowned healer of more than 30 years, Queen Afua, reveals three important questions every woman must ask her "yoni." She also shares her trusted healing tools for less stress and better sex, diet, and overall health.
87	11	"Paris Jackson x Willow Smith One-on-One"	Paris Jackson	June 16, 2021
Paris Jackson opens up in a rare in-depth conversation with longtime friend Willow about their shared struggles with mental health, sexuality, betrayal, and self-harm. Paris also gives an exclusive performance of her new song "Freckles."
88	12	"Will Smith Brings Kevin Hart to the Red Table"	Will Smith & Kevin Hart	June 20, 2021
Will and Kevin Hart come to the Table for an intimate, in-depth, one-on-one special event. This not-be-missed conversation covers everything from parenting mistakes, ex-wives, personal confessions, revelations, and important lessons.
89	13	"Salma Hayek’s Best Advice"	Salma Hayek	June 23, 2021
Salma Hayek joins the Table for an intimate, revealing conversation about motherhood, menopause, and marriage. Jada reveals how Salma's wise words helped her through one of the most difficult times in her life.
90	14	"Love Without Labels: Maria Bello and Her Fiancé Dominique Share Their Story"	Maria Bello & Dominique Crenn	June 24, 2021
Maria Bello opens up about her sexuality journey, from having a son with her longtime boyfriend to her upcoming wedding to French chef Dominique Crenn. She reveals challenges of being judged and Dominique's near-fatal cancer diagnosis.
91	15	"Are You Drinking Too Much? A Wake Up Call for Women"	Annie Grace	July 7, 2021
Jada reveals her personal struggles with alcohol, and a liver specialist shares information you need to know. Plus, stories of hitting rock bottom and binge drinking from: the Teacher of the Year, a NYC Attorney, and a global vice-president.
92	16	"Jada Goes Bald!"	Tiffany Haddish, Yvonne Orji & Sidra Smith	September 15, 2021
Superstar comedian Tiffany Haddish crashes the Red Table determined to find out why Jada shaved her head. Also: Insecure star Yvonne Orji shares her traumatic hair journey; and three brave women make a bold choice and shave their heads.
93	17	"Jada’s Surprise 50th Birthday Celebration"	Octavia Spencer, Kerry Washington, Angela Bassett, Mariah Carey, Ciara, Gabrielle Union, George Clooney, Missy Elliott, Bethenny Frankel, Lauren London, Meagan Good, Tia Mowry, Gloria Estefan, Arsenio Hall, Lena Waithe, Samuel L. Jackson, Toni Braxton, Jimmy Kimmel, Trevor Noah, Tina Knowles-Lawson, Duane Martin, MC Lyte, Method Man, Michael Strahan, Jaden Smith, and Trey Smith	September 22, 2021
George Clooney, Mariah Carey, Gabrielle Union, Kerry Washington, Jimmy Kimmel, Ciara, Method Man, Angela Bassett, and many more join the Red Table in celebration of Jada's 50th birthday. Plus: a surprise performance by a Grammy-winning superstar.
94	18	"Brazilian Butt Lifts: What to Know"	Michelle Visage & Myla Bennett-Powell	September 29, 2021
The ladies explore the dangers of the BBL with a top plastic surgeon who refuses to do them; RuPaul's Drag Race star Michelle Visage shares the side effects of her breast implants and why she made the decision to have them removed.
95	19	"Cyberstalking: How to Protect Yourself"	Flynn Adams & Dr. Thomas Hyslip	October 6, 2021
Willow shares her frightening experience with a cyberstalker; Flynn Adams, daughter of Jane Seymour, reveals what brought extreme danger to her; a young woman tells how she was tricked into sending naked photos to a sextortionist.
96	20	"Help Us Find Missing People with Elizabeth Smart"	Elizabeth Smart & Laura Coates	October 13, 2021
Elizabeth Smart, who survived unthinkable torture by kidnappers, comes to the Table to lend her powerful voice; former federal prosecutor Laura Coates explains why women of color become someone's "perfect prey."
97	21	"Gwyneth Paltrow Talks Sex"	Gwyneth Paltrow & Jaiya	October 27, 2021
Academy Award-winner Gwyneth Paltrow comes to the Red Table for a candid conversation about sex and shares important advice on how to have the intimacy and sex you really want.
98	22	"How to Set Boundaries and Change Your Life"	Lauren London & Nedra Glover Tawwab	November 3, 2021
Healthy boundaries...we all need them, but what are they really? Lauren London and Nedra Glover Tawwab join the Table to discuss the struggles many of us have, like saying no, issues with co-dependency, anxiety, and more.
99	23	"The Miracle Treatment We Almost Couldn’t Tell You About"	Lisa Ling, Michael Pollan, Paul Song & Jaden Smith	November 10, 2021
Jaden Smith brings an underground topic to the Table: magic mushrooms. What was once done in secret and thought of as a dangerous drug, top doctors now say might be the miracle treatment for mental health.
100	24	"Will Smith Invites Venus and Serena to the Table"	Will Smith, Venus Williams, Serena Williams, Simone Biles, Naomi Campbell, Karlie Kloss & Novak Djokovic	November 17, 2021
Will takes over the Table for a conversation with two of the greatest athletes ever: Venus and Serena Williams. It's a discussion about lessons, losses, wisdom, and behind-the-scenes stories from their new film, King Richard.
101	25	"Sandra Bullock’s Most Important Role"	Sandra Bullock	December 1, 2021
Oscar winner Sandra Bullock opens up about her motherhood journey. The usually private superstar talks about adoption, the traumas of the foster-care system, and what parenting two Black children has taught her.
102	26	"What Happens When You Accidentally Take Someone’s Life"	John Arthur Greene	December 8, 2021
In the wake of cinematographer Halyna Hutchins' fatal wounding during an on-set shooting involving Alec Baldwin, people who have caused unimaginable tragedies come forward to share the steps they've taken to overcome their anguish and trauma.
103	27	"Keanu Reeves, Carrie-Anne Moss & Priyanka Chopra Jonas: An Exclusive Matrix Reunion"	Keanu Reeves, Carrie-Anne Moss, Priyanka Chopra & Jaden Smith	December 15, 2021
We're celebrating RTT's 100th episode in a big way: for the first time together, superstars Keanu Reeves, Carrie-Anne Moss, and Priyanka Chopra Jonas join Jada, Willow, and Jaden for A SPECIAL MATRIX REUNION.
104	28	"Is Your Gut Making You Sick?"	Jaden Smith	December 22, 2021
Jada, Gammy, and Jaden sit down with medical and dietary experts to solve the gut problems that have plagued them for years. Plus, Jada and Gammy allow cameras to follow them to the hospital as they get an invasive medical test.

=== Season 5 (2022) ===
Red Table Talk, season 5 episodes
No. overall	No. in season	Title	Featured guest	Original release date
105	1	"Janelle Monáe’s Hidden Struggles"	Janelle Monáe & Janet Hawthorne	April 20, 2022
Superstar Janelle Monáe joins the Red Table and shares her inspiring message for anyone who's ever felt like they didn't fit in or can't be themselves; a special appearance by Janelle's fierce, fun-loving mom shakes up the Table.
106	2	"Kim Basinger + Ireland Baldwin: Living with Anxiety, Panic Attacks + Phobias"	Kim Basinger & Ireland Baldwin	April 27, 2022
Oscar winner Kim Basinger and her daughter Ireland Baldwin join the Table for their first-ever interview together. They open up about their crippling anxiety, panic attacks, phobias, and mental-health issues that impact millions.
107	3	"The Story Behind Miss USA Cheslie Kryst’s Suicide: Her Mother Speaks Out for the First Time"	April Simpkins	May 4, 2022
The heartbroken mom and stepdad of Miss USA Cheslie Kryst join the Red Table after their daughter tragically died by suicide earlier this year. Cheslie's mother April shares the devastating final message her daughter sent before her death.
108	4	"Tinder Swindler and Anna Delvey Victims: What You Haven’t Heard"	Ayleen Charlotte, Ramani Durvasula & Rachel DeLoache Williams	May 11, 2022
"Tinder Swindler" victim Ayleen Charlotte speaks out for the first time since the record-breaking documentary; Rachel Williams, victim of "the fake German heiress" Anna Delvey discloses trauma and the fallout after a vacation from hell.
109	5	"Fentanyl: An Urgent Warning for All"	Dominic DuPont & Kate Quigley	May 18, 2022
Actor Michael K. Williams' nephew speaks out about losing his beloved uncle to fentanyl; comic Kate Quigley reveals how she was the lone survivor of a fentanyl poisoning that killed three of her friends, including comedian Fuquan Johnson.
109	6	"How Mothers Damage Their Daughters: Could This Be You?"	Kelly McDaniel & Tanika Ray	May 25, 2022
Did you know there are THREE CRITICAL NEEDS every daughter requires from her mother? "Mother Hunger" author and trauma psychotherapist Kelly McDaniel joins the table as Jada, Gammy, and Willow open up about how their mothers affected them.
110	7	"Alopecia: The Devastating Impact"	Charlie Villanueva	June 1, 2022
The mother of 12-year-old Rio Allred, who suffered from Alopecia and took her own life, opens up about her daughter's death, and a woman who worked in the hair industry for more than a decade reveals why it's more than "just hair."
111	8	"Queen Latifah is on a Mission!"	Queen Latifah	June 8, 2022
Superstar Queen Latifah joins the Table to reveal a personal struggle that's taken her a long time to understand, shares her important new mission, and offers her one-of-a-kind wisdom to a special group of fans.
112	9	"Extreme Violence: Inside the Minds of People Who Hate"	Jeff Schoep, Deeyah Khan, Jillian Peterson, Ibram X. Kendi & Zach Banner	June 16, 2022
With one hate crime committed every hour and multiple mass shootings happening every day in the US, Red Table Talk gathers a special group of leading voices to reveal the roots of hatred and extreme violence.
113	10	"How Not to Be Scammed"	Barbara Corcoran	June 22, 2022
Someone is trying to steal your money, your identity, your passwords. Red Table Talk is sharing critical information to protect yourself, your family, and your money. Business mogul Barbara Cocoran reveals how she went from Shark to victim.
114	11	"How Jennette McCurdy Survived Her Mom’s Abuse"	Jennette McCurdy, Kelly McDaniel, Abby Jasmine, David Archuleta, Violet Benson, Mayim Bialik, Nia Dennis, Rosie McClelland & Alyson Stoner	September 7, 2022
After years of suffering in silence, iCarly star Jennette McCurdy bravely opens up in her first in-depth interview about the decades of torment, exploitation, and manipulation inflicted by her very own mother.
115	12	"Parental Alienation: When Your Child is Turned Against You"	Teddy Riley & Nia Riley	September 14, 2022
Music legend Teddy Riley's at the Table sharing the heartbreaking ordeal that he and more than 22 million other families are experiencing.
116	13	"What is Gaslighting? Could It Be Happening to You?"	Ramani Durvasula & Rebecca Humphries	September 21, 2022
You might be a victim of gaslighting and not even know it. We've all heard the term; now Red Table Talk brings you the essential guide to gaslighting. The Crown actress Rebecca Humphries reveals the damage caused by being gaslighted.
117	14	"‘I Was Stuck in a Horrifying Nightmare’ – Hayden Panettiere’s Untold Story"	Hayden Panettiere & Kelly Osbourne	September 28, 2022
Heroes actress Hayden Panettiere bravely opens up about years of alcohol abuse and crippling postpartum depression; for the first time she reveals her truth about giving up custody of her only child.
118	15	"‘The World Hated Me’ - Constance Wu Back from the Brink"	Constance Wu	October 5, 2022
Crazy Rich Asians star Constance Wu vanished from the spotlight three years ago. Now she's at the Red Table for an emotional conversation about unrelenting backlash from 'careless tweets' that nearly cost her her career and her life.
119	16	"How the Police Killed Breonna Taylor: The Only Witness Speaks Out"	Benjamin Crump, Tamika Mallory, Tamika Palmer & Kenneth Walker	October 12, 2022
In this RTT special, the only witness to Breonna Taylor's death at the hands of police reveals what really happened that tragic night. It's an important, raw, gripping conversation that everyone must see.
120	17	"Are You a Toxic Forgiver?"	Sheree Zampino & Jana Kramer	October 19, 2022
Sheree Zampino, Will's former wife, joins the table for a revealing raw conversation about her relationship with Jada. Country-music star Jana Kramer reveals how continually forgiving her ex-husband's infidelities made her lose herself.
121	18	"‘I Saw My Mother Falling Apart’ – Journalist Jemele Hill + Her Mom’s First Interview Together"	Jemele Hill, Cari Champion, Magic Johnson, Cookie Johnson, Holly Robinson Peete, Rodney Peete & Gabrielle Union	October 26, 2022
Sports journalist Jemele Hill and her mother Denise sit down for their first interview together and reveal the pain passed down in their family after Denise relied on drugs to cope with severe PTSD after being abused and raped.
122	19	"‘I Didn’t Know What a Healthy Relationship Was’ – Cheryl Burke on Breaking Her Trauma Bonds"	Cheryl Burke & Alfiee Breland-Noble	November 2, 2022
Cheryl Burke opens up about her recent divorce and why four years of sobriety is "not easy right now." Renowned psychologist Dr. Alfiee Breland-Noble reveals the surprising ways our childhood experiences influence our adult relationships.
123	20	"‘I Was a Good Person Doing Bad Things’ – How Fat Joe Went All the Way Up"	Fat Joe	November 9, 2022
Life lessons from the one and only Grammy-nominated artist, author, and entrepreneur Fat Joe. It's a raw, revealing, hilarious conversation that only Fat Joe could bring, proving why he's known as the G.O.A.T. of hip-hop storytelling.
124	21	"‘He Wanted to Hurt Me One Last Time’ – Supermodel Paulina Porizkova on Betrayal, Abandonment + Loss"	Paulina Porizkova & Maria Shriver	November 16, 2022
Iconic supermodel Paulina Porizkova had a picture-perfect life: beauty, the largest modeling contract in history, a rock-star husband, and two sons. She now opens up about her separation from Ric Ocasek, and his untimely death.
125	22	"‘That Was the Darkest Time in My Life’ – Ashanti’s Sister Shia Douglas Speaks Out About Domestic Abuse"	Ashanti, Kenashia ‘Shia’ Douglas & Tina Douglas	November 23, 2022
Ashanti, her younger sister Kenashia "Shia" Douglas, and their mom Tina open up about the domestic abuse Shia endured. In their first interview together, this tight-knit family shares what they call the "darkest time of their lives."
126	23	"How to Find and Keep a Healthy Relationship"	Violet Benson, DeVon Franklin, Lewis Howes, Matthew Hussey, Stephan Labossiere, Ciara Miller, Deepti Vempani, Michelle Young & Sheree Zampino	December 5, 2022
In this special edition of RTT, renowned experts who have helped millions have healthier relationships reveal highly sought-after advice that you must hear. If you want to change your love life, don't miss this engaging conversation.
127	24	"Jay Shetty Reveals His Highly Anticipated Rules of Love"	Jay Shetty & Zashia Monique Santiago	December 12, 2022
Think you know how to love? Think again. For the first time, best-selling author, purpose coach, and former monk Jay Shetty reveals his highly-anticipated rules of love.
128	25	"Will Smith’s Red Table Takeover: Will Smith and His Kids Take Over the Red Table"	Will Smith, Trey Smith, Jaden Smith, Ben Foster & Antoine Fuqua	December 14, 2022
Will is taking over the Red Table with his kids to open up about the most transformative time of his life: making the movie Emancipation. Will shares the biggest revelations of his life, and a co-star who refused to speak to him.
129	26	"An RTT Special Event: A Different World Reunion"	Debbie Allen, Darryl M. Bell, Charnele Brown, Jasmine Guy, Kadeem Hardison, Dawnn Lewis, Ajai Sanders, Cree Summer, Marisa Tomei, Glynn Turman, Karen Malina White & Patti LaBelle	December 19, 2022
The superstar cast of the groundbreaking series A Different World reunites for the first time at the Red Table, revealing exclusive behind-the-scenes stories and hilarious and heartfelt memories, and reliving their favorite episodes.

== Reception ==
=== Critical response ===
In a positive review, USA Today's Maeve McDermott praised the series for its "insightful guests, no-holds-barred topics and Smith’s magnetic hosting presence" and favorably compared to other television series saying, "Unlike the web of other celebrity TV shows featuring manufactured family drama and few moments of actual clarity, though, the revealing conversations on Red Table Talk have authentic, difficult lessons at their center." In another encouraging criticism, The Washington Post's Bethonie Butler was equally approving saying, "It's a shrewd business move for the Smiths to acknowledge and address long-standing rumors about their family in a format they can control. That said, there's an authenticity woven throughout the episodes that makes Red Table Talk stand out amid a surplus of celebrity-hosted talk shows." The show received a 2019 Daytime Emmy Award nomination in the informative talk-show category.

=== Viewership ===
By July 17, 2018, the show's debut episode had been watched 27 million times and episode ten had accumulated 21 million views.

== Awards and nominations ==
Award nominations for Red Table Talk
Year	Award	Category	Nominee(s)	Result	Ref.
2018	Streamy Awards	Non-Fiction Series	Red Table Talk	Nominated	
2018	People's Choice Awards	The Daytime Talk Show of 2018	Red Table Talk	Nominated	
2019	Daytime Emmy Awards	Outstanding Talk Show/Informative	Red Table Talk	Nominated	
2019	NAACP Image Awards	Outstanding Host in a Talk or News / Information (Series or Special) - Individual or Ensemble	Jada Pinkett Smith, Willow Smith and Adrienne Banfield-Norris	Won	
2021	Critics' Choice Television Awards	Best Talk Show	Red Table Talk	Nominated	
2021	MTV Movie & TV Awards	Best Talk/Topical Show	Red Table Talk	Nominated	
2021	Daytime Emmy Awards	Outstanding Talk Show Informative	Red Table Talk	Won	
2021	Daytime Emmy Awards	Outstanding Talk Show Informative	Red Table Talk: The Estefans	Nominated	
2021	Daytime Emmy Awards	Outstanding Informative Talk Show Host	Jada Pinkett Smith, Willow Smith and Adrienne Banfield-Norris (from Red Table Talk)	Nominated	
2021	Daytime Emmy Awards	Outstanding Informative Talk Show Host	Gloria Estefan, Emily Estefan and Lili Estefan (from Red Table Talk: The Estefans)	Nominated	
2021	Daytime Emmy Awards	Outstanding Daytime Non-fiction Special	Red Table Talk: Will Smith’s Red Table Takeover: Resolving Conflict	Nominated	
2021	Daytime Emmy Awards	Outstanding Hairstyling	Red Table Talk	Nominated	
2021	Daytime Emmy Awards	Outstanding Makeup	Red Table Talk	Nominated	
2022	Daytime Emmy Awards	Outstanding Hairstyling	Red Table Talk	Nominated	
2022	Daytime Emmy Awards	Outstanding Makeup	Red Table Talk	Nominated	
2022	Daytime Emmy Awards	Outstanding Hairstyling	Georgina Del Pino and William Isaac Mesa (from Red Table Talk: The Estefans)	Won	
