= One (song) =

Songs with the title "One" or "1" include:

- "#1", by Future and Metro Boomin from We Still Don't Trust You, 2024
- "1", by Joy Zipper, 2005
- "One" (Aimer song), 2017
- "One" (Ami Suzuki song), from Supreme Show, 2008
- "One" (Bee Gees song), from the album of the same name, 1989
- "One" (Busta Rhymes song), from When Disaster Strikes..., 1998
- "One" (A Chorus Line song), 1974
- "One" (Creed song), from My Own Prison, 1999
- "One" (Crystal Kay song), from the movie Giratina and the Sky Warrior, 2008
- "One" (Ed Sheeran song), from x, 2014
- "One" (Fat Joe song), from Jealous Ones Still Envy 2, 2009
- "One" (Harry Nilsson song), from Aerial Ballet, 1969, made famous by Three Dog Night
- "One" (JayKo song), 2009
- "One" (Metallica song), from ...And Justice For All, 1988
- "One" (Sky Ferreira song), 2010
- "One" (Swedish House Mafia song), from Until One, 2010
- "One" (U2 song), from Achtung Baby, 1991
- "One (Always Hardcore)", by Scooter from Mind the Gap, 2004
- "O.N.E." (song), by Yeasayer, from Odd Blood, 2010
- "One", by Alanis Morissette from Supposed Former Infatuation Junkie, 1998
- "One", by Ane Brun from It All Starts with One, 2011
- "One", by Coheed and Cambria from Year of the Black Rainbow, 2010
- "One", by Epik High from Pieces, Part One, 2008
- "One", by Faith Hill from Cry, 2002
- "One", by GFriend from Flower Bud, 2015
- "One", by Ghostface Killah from Supreme Clientele, 2000
- "One", by Immortal Technique from Revolutionary Vol. 2, 2003
- "O.N.E." by King Gizzard and the Lizard Wizard, from L.W., 2021
- "One", by Kumi Koda from Grow into One, 2003
- "One", by Lewis Capaldi from Divinely Uninspired to a Hellish Extent, 2019
- "One!", by Misia from Love Is the Message
- "One", by Parachute Band from Roadmaps and Revelations, 2007
- "One", by Rip Slyme from Tokyo Classic, 2001
- "One", by Shapeshifter from Soulstice, 2006
- "One", by Simple Plan from Still Not Getting Any..., 2004
- "One", by Soulfly from 3, 2002
- "One", by Sunny Day Real Estate from The Rising Tide, 2000
- "One", by Tasman Keith and Kwame, 2021
- "One", by TVXQ from Heart, Mind and Soul, 2006
- "One", by Wicked Wisdom from Wicked Wisdom, 2006
- "One", by Zion I from Mind Over Matter, 2000
- "One", from the musical Bare: A Pop Opera
- "One", by Karma to Burn from the album Wild, Wonderful Purgatory, 1999
- "One (Blake's Got a New Face)", by Vampire Weekend from Vampire Weekend, 2008
