= -2 (disambiguation) =

−2 is the negative of the number 2.

-2 (minus 2, negative 2, dash 2) may also refer to:

- Negatives 2, a 2004 album by Phantom Planet
- EMD Dash 2, a line of diesel-electric locomotives
- de Havilland Canada DHC-2 Beaver, a utility aircraft
- Minus two formula, an attempt by Moeen U Ahmed to end the political careers of two former prime ministers in Bangladesh
- DASH 2, one of the DASH satellites
- DASH 2, a Kyoto model car

== See also ==
- -- (disambiguation)
