= +1 =

The term +1 may refer to:

== Arts, entertainment, and media ==
- +1 (album), by Kaela Kimura (2008)
- +1 (film), a horror film directed by Dennis Iliadis (2013)
- "+1" (song), by French DJ Martin Solveig (2015)
- +1 Records, a music management, publicity & marketing company
- +1 (also known as Plus One), a "lifeline" in the Who Wants to Be a Millionaire? franchise

== Technology ==
- +1 button, the "like" button implemented by Google applications
- Countries in the North American Numbering Plan (country calling code "+1")
  - For the list of codes, see list of North American Numbering Plan area codes
- +1, a suffix attached to the name of a television timeshift channel

== See also ==
- 1-up
- OnePlus, a Chinese smartphone manufacturer
- And 1 (disambiguation)
- Infinity plus one (disambiguation)
- One (disambiguation)
- Plus One (disambiguation)
- UTC+01:00, a time offset one hour ahead of Coordinated Universal Time
- Successor function
