= Wicked Wisdom =

American nu metal band

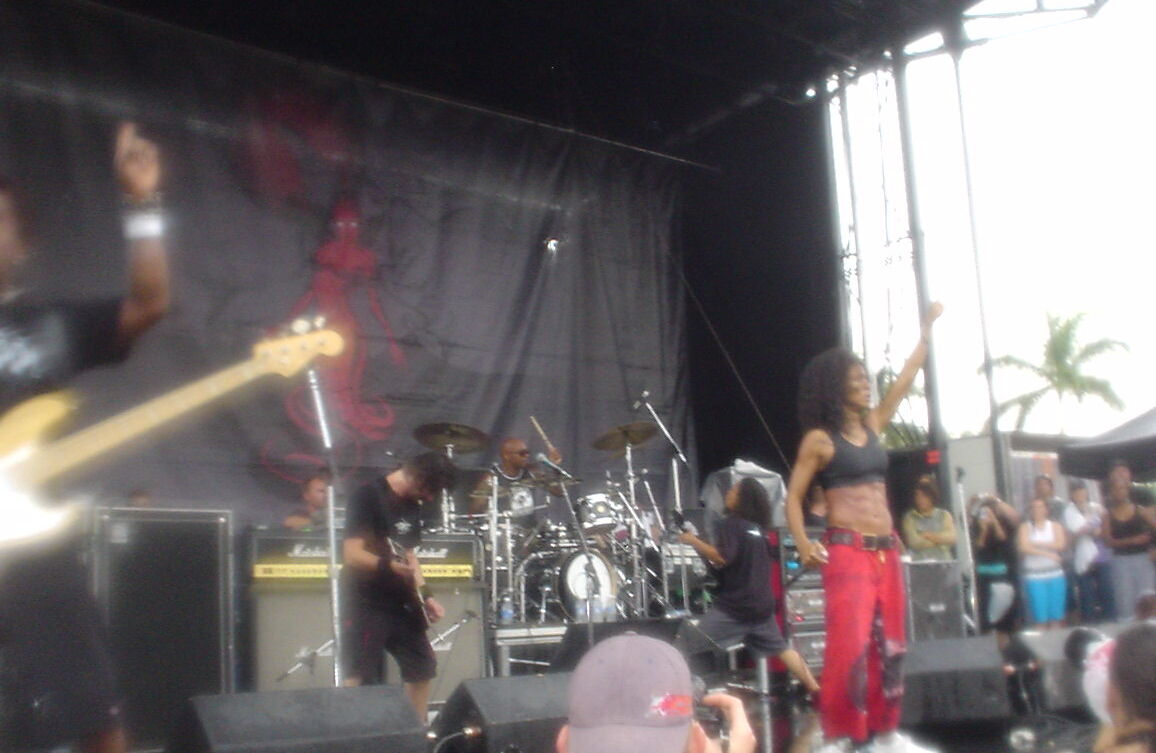
- Wicked Wisdom performing at Ozzfest 2005

Background information
- Origin: Los Angeles, California, U.S.
- Genres: Nu metal
- Years active: 2002–2006, 2021–present
- Labels: Suburban Noize, Interscope
- Members: Jada Koren; Cameron "Wirm" Graves; Philip "Fish" Fisher; Pocket Honore; Rio Lawrence
- Past members: Korel Tunador; Devin Vasquez
- Website: wickedwisdom.net

Wicked Wisdom is an American nu metal band from Los Angeles, California, formed by Jada Pinkett Smith in 2002.

== History ==
"I listened to all kinds of metal as a kid. Metallica, Guns N' Roses. I would always look at Axl Rose and say, 'Why aren't there any chicks out there doing this now?' I always wanted an opportunity to get out there and rock out."

— Pinkett Smith on why she created Wicked Wisdom

Actress Jada Pinkett Smith (under the name Jada Koren) formed the band in 2002. It consists of Pinkett Smith (lead vocals), Pocket Honore (guitar, vocals), Cameron "Wirm" Graves (guitar, keyboard, vocals), Rio Lawrence (bass, vocals), and Philip "Fish" Fisher (drums, formerly of Fishbone). The band is managed by James Lassiter and Miguel Melendez of Overbrook Entertainment, a company co-founded by Pinkett Smith's husband Will Smith.

=== The Onyx Hotel Tour ===
Wicked Wisdom landed a slot on Britney Spears' Onyx Hotel Tour in 2004, one of the year's highest-profile tours. To promote their 2004 debut album, titled My Story, the band opened for Spears for eight dates in April and May 2004 during the European leg of the tour.

=== Ozzfest 2005 ===
In 2005, Sharon Osbourne went to see Wicked Wisdom perform at a small night club in Los Angeles, California. She said, "I was blown away. When you see and hear Jada with her band it's apparent that she has nothing but love and respect for this genre of music." In May 2005 organizers announced Wicked Wisdom would perform on the second stage of 2005's Ozzfest. Fans of the festival were outraged, claiming the band did not have the credibility to perform at the music festival. Aware of the questions about the band's addition to Ozzfest, Pinkett Smith said, "I'm not here asking for any favors. You've got to show and prove. And not every audience is going to go for it." Wicked Wisdom's guitarist Pocket Honore said while early dates of the tour were rocky, "once word got out that we weren't a joke, people started coming out and by the sixth or seventh gig we were on fire." Pinkett Smith agreed, saying, "After seven dates within the Ozzfest tour, the whole attitude of it started to turn around once the word of mouth started getting out."

The band's self-titled second album was released on February 21, 2006, through Pinkett Smith's production company 100% Women and Suburban Noize Records. Will Smith served as the project's executive producer. The album made it to Billboard's Top Heatseekers chart, and peaked at number 44 during the week of March 11, 2006. AllMusic reviewer Alex Henderson said of the album, "[Pinkett Smith] shows herself to be an expressive, commanding singer" and that Wicked Wisdom "shows considerable promise". The band promoted the album in 2006, touring with heavy metal band Sevendust.

=== Wicked Evolution ===
In September 2011, Jada Pinkett Smith was seen/photographed leaving a recording studio, but speculation connected the moment to her daughter, Willow Smith, completing her debut album. In January 2012, a video posted to YouTube, claimed to show The Graves Brothers working in the studio on a gothic/piano rock styled pop song for what they called "the new Jada Pinkett Smith record". Over the next couple of weeks it was announced that the new band name was "Wicked Evolution".

In 2021, Wicked Wisdom reunited with Smith's daughter Willow Smith to perform "Bleed All Over Me" with Ronald Bruner Jr. on drums, Michael Anderson on bass guitar and Taylor Graves on keyboards for a Mother's Day episode of Red Table Talk.

== Discography ==
- My Story (2004)
- Wicked Wisdom (2006)

=== Music videos ===
==== As Wicked Wisdom ====
Year	Song	Album
2006	"Something Inside of Me"	Wicked Wisdom
2006	"Bleed All Over Me"	Wicked Wisdom
2013	"Stuck"	

==== As Wicked Evolution ====
Year	Song	Album
2012	"Left Behind"	
2012	"Burn"	
