= Year Zero (disambiguation) =

Year zero is the year before 1 AD used in astronomical calculations.

Year Zero may also refer to:

== Music ==
- Year Zero (album), a 2007 album by Nine Inch Nails
  - Year Zero (game), an alternate reality game based on the album
  - Year Zero Remixed, a remix album by Nine Inch Nails
- "Year Zero" (song) by Ghost
- Year Zero, a 2004 album by Slam (band)
- Year Zero, a 1996 album by Buck 65
- Year Zero, a 2002 album by Galahad (band)
- Year Zero, a 1997 album by 18 Wheeler (band)
- Year Zero - the original soundtrack, a 2012 album by Black Mountain (band)
- "Year Zero", a song by Momus for his 2016 album Scobberlotchers
- "Year Zero", a song by Thirty Seconds to Mars
- "Year Zero", a song by Billy Woods and Kenny Segal for their 2023 album Maps

== Literature ==
- Year Zero (Reid novel), a 2012 science fiction novel by Robert Reid
- Year Zero, a 1995 book of poetry by Brian Henderson (poet)
- Year Zero, a 2002 novel by Jeff Long (writer)
- Year Zero: A History of 1945, a 2013 nonfiction book by Ian Buruma

== Entertainment ==
- Germany, Year Zero, a 1948 Italian film directed by Roberto Rossellini
- Panic in Year Zero!, a 1962 American film directed by Ray Milland
- Year Zero: The Silent Death of Cambodia, a 1979 British television documentary
- Tirana Year Zero, a 2002 Albanian film
- Year Zero (Bernice Summerfield), a Doctor Who audio drama
- "Year Zero" (Gotham), an episode of Gotham
- Année Zéro (English: Year Zero), a French-Belgian television crime drama

== Other uses ==
- Year Zero (political notion), the dating of the takeover of Cambodia by the Khmer Rouge
- Stunde Null, a reference to the first year in post-war Germany (1946)
- The first portion of the Vault 7 documents made public by WikiLeaks in March 2017 are referred to as "Year Zero"

== See also ==
- Year One (disambiguation)
