= Jada Pinkett Smith =

American actress (born 1971)

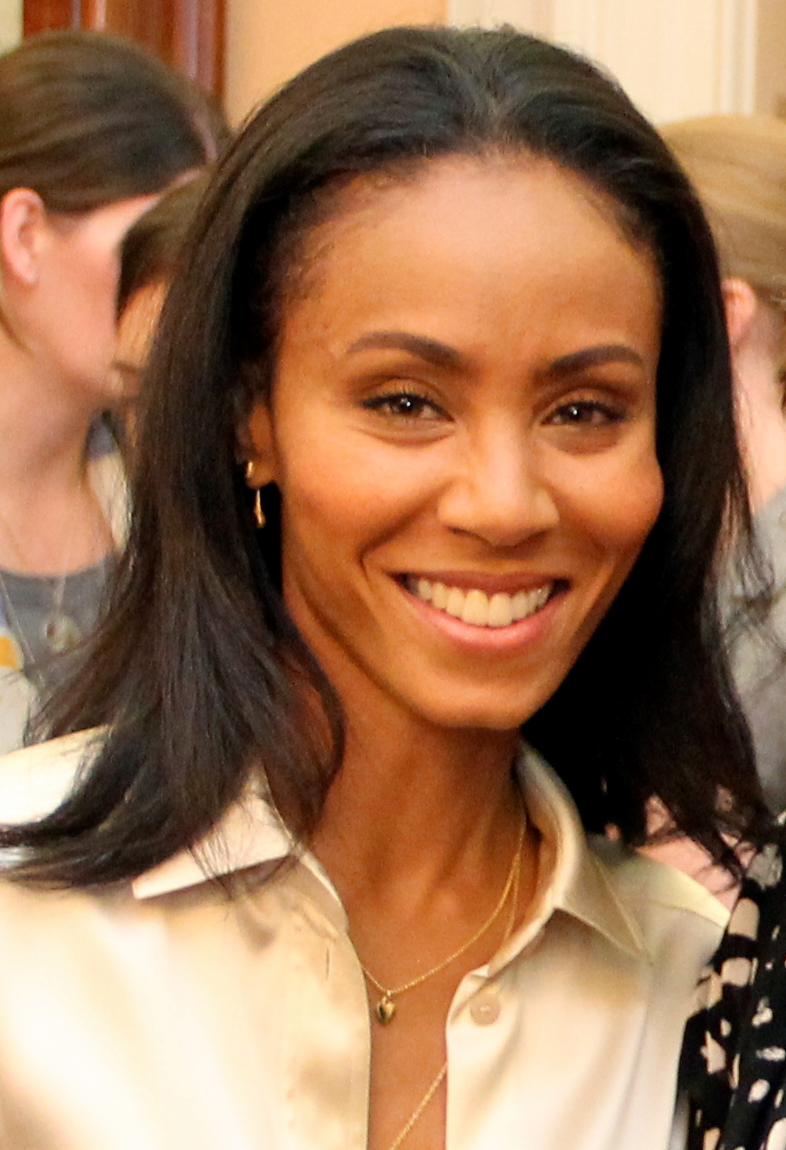
- Pinkett Smith in 2017
- Born: Jada Koren Pinkett; September 18, 1971 (age 55); Baltimore, Maryland, U.S.
- Occupations: Actress; talk show host; businesswoman; musician
- Years active: 1990–present
- Organizations: Westbrook Inc.; 100% Womon Productions
- Agent: Endeavor
- Spouse: Will Smith (m. 1997; sep. 2016)
- Children: Jaden; Willow
- Website: jadapinkettsmith.com

Jada Koren Pinkett Smith (née Pinkett; born September 18, 1971) is an American actress, musician, businesswoman, and talk show host. She has earned a Daytime Emmy Award, a MTV Movie Award, and four NAACP Image Awards as well as nominations for a People's Choice Awards and a Tony Award. She was named one of the 100 most influential people in the world in 2021 by Time magazine.

Pinkett Smith made her film debut in 1992. Her most notable roles include Niobe in The Matrix films (2003–2021) and voicing Gloria the Hippo in the DreamWorks Animated Madagascar franchise (2005–2012). She has also acted in the films Menace II Society (1993), Jason's Lyric (1994), The Nutty Professor (1996), Set It Off (1996), Scream 2 (1997), Collateral (2004), Magic Mike XXL (2015), Bad Moms (2016), and Girls Trip (2017).

On television, she acted in the sitcom A Different World (1991–1993), the medical drama series Hawthorne (2009–2011) and Gotham (2014–2017). She also co-hosted the Facebook Watch talk show Red Table Talk (2018–2022) earning a Daytime Emmy Award. Pinkett Smith was the lead vocalist of the nu metal band Wicked Wisdom and has published two books. She was married to actor Will Smith from 1997 to 2016. Together they founded the company Westbrook in 2019. She produced the Tony Award-nominated Broadway musical Fela! (2010).

== Early life and education ==
Born in Baltimore, Maryland, Jada Koren Pinkett was named after her mother's favorite soap opera actress, Jada Rowland. She is of Jamaican and Bajan descent on her mother's side and Black-American descent on her father's side. Her parents are Adrienne Banfield-Norris, the head nurse of a Baltimore inner-city clinic, and Robsol Pinkett Jr., who ran a construction company. Banfield-Norris became pregnant in high school, and the couple married but divorced after several months.

Pinkett was raised by her mother and grandmother, Marion Martin Banfield, a Jamaican-born social worker who was married to Gilbert Banfield, a family medicine physician. "My grandmother was a doer who wanted to create a better community and add beauty to the world," she said. Banfield noticed her granddaughter's passion for the performing arts and enrolled her in piano, tap dance, and ballet lessons.

During elementary school, Pinkett got to know Josh Charles. She also participated in TWIGs ("To Work In Gaining Skills"), a free after-school program for 2nd-8th grade Baltimore City children offered by the Baltimore School for the Arts. The program is competitive; students must audition and only a few hundred are accepted each year. TWIGs is also often a stepping stone for additional arts training; about half of the entering class of Baltimore School for the Arts are TWIGs alumni.

Pinkett attended the Baltimore School for the Arts, where she studied acting and dance. While at BSA, she met and became close friends with classmate and rapper Tupac Shakur. She also reunited with her friend, Josh Charles. Pinkett graduated in 1989. Pinkett has admitted she was not the best student in high school, and frequently showed up late. Pinkett has remained an active alumnus of BSA.

She was raised in the Pimlico/Arlington neighborhood in a home on Price Avenue. Growing up, she hung out in the neighborhoods of Coldspring and Dolfield. As a teen, she went to clubs including Cignel, Odell's Nightclub, and Godfrey's Famous Ballroom. She has also publicly admitted selling drugs in the Cherry Hill neighborhood. After graduation from BSA, Pinkett spent a year at the North Carolina School of the Arts. She was a drama major.

== Film and television career ==
=== Early career (1990–1995) ===
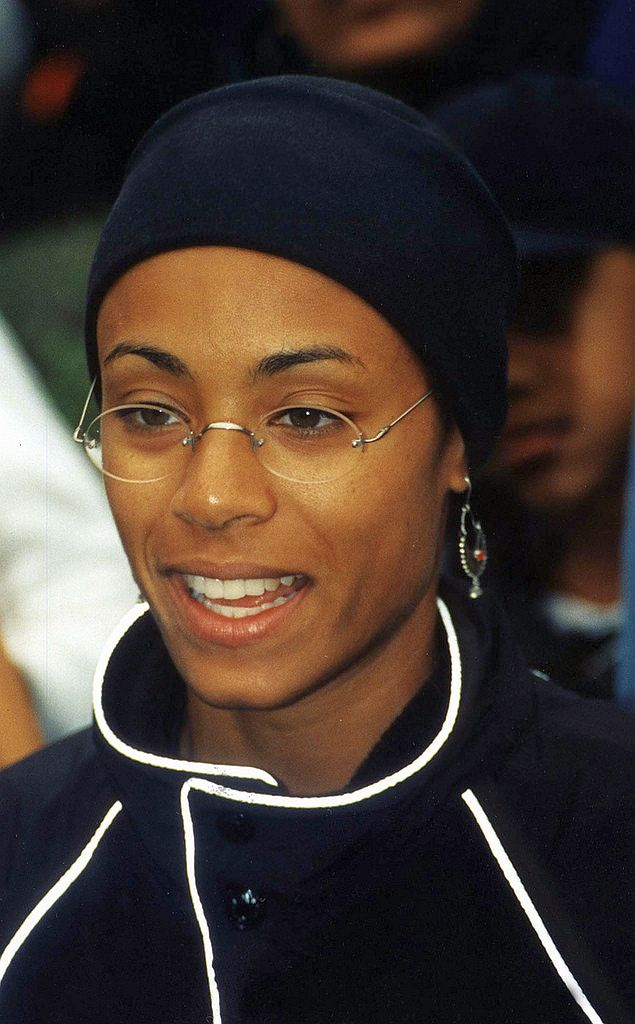
Pinkett Smith at the Million Woman March in 1997

Pinkett began her acting career in 1990, when she starred in an episode of True Colors. She received guest roles in television shows such as Doogie Howser, M.D. (1991) and 21 Jump Street (1991), and earned a role on comedian Bill Cosby's NBC television sitcom A Different World in 1991, as college freshman Lena James.

The role on A Different World proved to be a pivotal career break. Pinkett joined the cast in its fourth season when it was already a hit show and stayed on the show until its final season. Like Pinkett, the character of Lena James was from a poor area of Baltimore. The character originally was a fish out of water; as a freshman she explained, "I really miss my homeboys. They're not like these Hillman brothers, all self-involved and afraid to sweat." The character of Lena James adapts and as a sophomore, when her Baltimore friends visit, she finds herself stuck between the world where she was raised and the world she was now in at Hillman. Lena James enters Hillman as an engineering major, but discovers her talent for writing and switches to journalism.

In 1993, Pinkett appeared in her first film, Menace II Society. A recommendation from her friend Tupac Shakur got her cast as single mother Ronnie. Shakur was also set to appear in the film before he was fired. Pinkett considered dropping out of the film after Shakur's departure but he convinced her to keep the role.

In 1994, Pinkett acted with Keenen Ivory Wayans in the action and comedy film A Low Down Dirty Shame. She described her character Peaches as "raw" with "major attitude", and her acting garnered positive reviews. The New York Times wrote, "Ms. Pinkett, whose performance is as sassy and sizzling as a Salt-N-Pepa recording, walks away with the movie." In 1994, she also starred as a title character in Doug McHenry's romantic drama Jason's Lyric, opposite Allen Payne. In his positive review of the film, Roger Ebert wrote, "[Payne] has powerful chemistry with the enigmatic, teasing, tender character played by Pinkett; they really seem to like one another, which is not a feeling you always pick up in screen romances." That year, she also had a role in the romantic comedy-drama The Inkwell.

In 1995, Pinkett played a convict on work release in the horror film Demon Knight. According to Larenz Tate, Pinkett was set to appear in the film Dead Presidents (1995), but she turned down the role of Delilah due to her loyalty to Shakur. The Hughes brothers directed the film and they had fired Shakur from Menace II Society.

Pinkett also began directing music videos in 1995. She directed the music video "I'm Going Down" by girl group Y? N-Vee. She also directed the music video "How Many Times" by Gerald Levert and appeared in the video. "It was reported that Pinkett would direct the music video for Shakur's song "Can U Get Away" but another single was released instead. Pinkett came up with the concept for his "California Love" music video which she had intended to direct, but she removed herself from the project.

=== Rise to prominence (1996–2002) ===
Pinkett starred with actor and comedian Eddie Murphy in the 1996 remake of The Nutty Professor, portraying the love interest of a morbidly-obese, kindhearted university professor. The film was a commercial success, earning $25 million in its first weekend in North America and eventually $274 million worldwide. She also had a lead role in Set It Off (1996), a crime drama about four women who rob banks to escape from poverty, opposite Queen Latifah, Vivica A. Fox, and Kimberly Elise. Her acting in the film was noted in the San Francisco Chronicle, which wrote that she was "the one to watch". Budgeted at $9 million, Set It Off made $41 million globally. Pinkett also directed the music video "Keep On Keepin' On" by MC Lyte Feat. Xscape.

In 1997, Pinkett had a cameo role in Scream 2 as a college student who is brutally murdered in front of hundreds of filmgoers. The film made more than $100 million at the North American box office. In 1998, she played a news reporter in the thriller Return to Paradise, with Joaquin Phoenix and Vince Vaughn, and took on the title role of an extroverted woman, alongside Tommy Davidson, in the comedy Woo. While favorably reviewing her performance in Woo, Derek Armstrong of AllMovie wrote that the script was "formulaic" and "not much of a vehicle for its impish starlet". She next starred in Spike Lee's film Bamboozled (2000) as a personal assistant to the main character, played by Damon Wayans. Although the film met with mediocre reviews, it won the National Board of Review's Freedom of Expression Award.

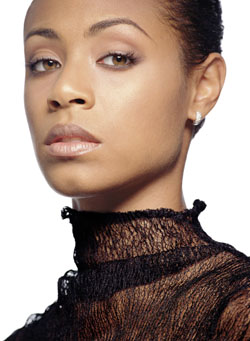
Pinkett Smith in 2001

In 2001, Pinkett Smith portrayed a loud-mouthed wife in the moderately successful comedy Kingdom Come, with LL Cool J, Vivica A. Fox, Anthony Anderson, Toni Braxton, and Whoopi Goldberg. In the biographical sports drama Ali (2001), she played Sonji Roi, the first wife of boxer Muhammad Ali, opposite Will Smith. While she loved the final product, she initially did not think she was the right person for the role: "I felt like because we were a couple off screen, for people to see us together on the screen in a movie like this, would take people out of the movie, that people would see Will and Jada there—they wouldn't see Ali and Sonji".

=== Commercial success (2003–2017) ===
Perhaps her best-known role is the part of human rebel Niobe in the films The Matrix Reloaded (2003) and The Matrix Revolutions (2003)—sequels to 1999's The Matrix—and the related video game Enter The Matrix (2003). The character was written specifically with Pinkett Smith in mind. Directly after she filmed her scenes for Ali, Pinkett Smith flew to Australia to work on the Matrix sequels. The sequels earned over $91 million and $48 million during their North American opening weekends, respectively.

In the neonoir thriller Collateral (2004), alongside Jamie Foxx and Tom Cruise, Pinkett Smith played a U.S. Justice Department prosecutor and the target of a contract killer. The film was a critical and commercial success, grossing $217.8 million worldwide. She voiced Gloria, a strong, confident, but sweet hippopotamus, in the animated film Madagascar (2005). Tom McGrath, one of the film's directors, said they found all these traits in her voice when they listened to her. Despite a mixed response from critics, the film was a commercial success, earning $532 million worldwide, and becoming one of the biggest hits of 2005. In 2005, she published a children's book, Girls Hold Up This World, which landed at number two on The New York Times Best Seller list. In 2007, she played the wife of an affluent dentist in the drama Reign Over Me, with Adam Sandler, Don Cheadle, Liv Tyler, and Donald Sutherland. Entertainment Weekly called the film a "strange, black-and-blue therapeutic drama equally mottled with likable good intentions and agitating clumsiness", and found Pinkett Smith "graceful" in it.

In 2008, Pinkett Smith took on the role of a lesbian author in the all-female comedy The Women, opposite Meg Ryan, Annette Bening, Debra Messing, and Eva Mendes. Though a commercial success, The Women was panned by critics, with Pinkett Smith earning a nomination for the Golden Raspberry Award for Worst Actress for her performance. Her directorial debut was the drama The Human Contract (also 2008); she also wrote it, and starred as the sister of a successful but unhappy businessman, with Paz Vega and Idris Elba. It debuted at the Cannes Film Festival in May 2008. The success of Madagascar led Pinkett Smith to return to the role of Gloria in the 2008 sequel Madagascar: Escape 2 Africa, which earned US$603 million at the international box office.

Pinkett Smith was an executive producer and starred as a Chief Nursing Officer in the TNT medical drama Hawthorne, which premiered on June 16, 2009. USA Today remarked: "Pinkett Smith's Hawthorne is tired in every sense of the word, and she's not the only one. Every character and event falls under the category of painfully predictable". Hawthorne ended on August 16, 2011, after three seasons. In 2010, she earned a nomination for the Tony Award for Best Musical as a producer for the Broadway musical Fela!. While she reprised the voice role of Gloria in Madagascar 3: Europe's Most Wanted (2012), which made over US$746 million, she also voiced the character in the NBC Christmas special Merry Madagascar (2009) and the direct-to-DVD film Madly Madagascar (2013).

Beginning in 2014, Pinkett Smith starred in the first season of the FOX crime drama Gotham, as Gotham City gangster Fish Mooney. She returned, recurrently, in the second and third seasons of the series. In 2015, she starred in the comedy Magic Mike XXL, as the manager of a star stripper club, opposite Channing Tatum and Joe Manganiello. The film made US$122.5 million worldwide. She starred with Mila Kunis, Kristen Bell and Christina Applegate in the comedy Bad Moms (2016), as the sidekick of a domineering parent-teacher association head. It received mixed reviews from critics, who praised the cast and humor, though did not feel it could "take full advantage of its assets". The film, nevertheless, earned more than US$183.9 million.

Pinkett Smith next took on the role of a nurse and uptight mom in the comedy Girls Trip (2017), alongside Regina Hall, Queen Latifah, and Tiffany Haddish. The film was chosen by Time magazine as one of its top ten films of 2017, and grossed US$140 million worldwide, including over US$100 million domestically, the first comedy of 2017 to do so. In July 2017, Pinkett Smith appeared at the Essence Festival where, on the Empowerment Stage, she appeared to talk alongside Queen Latifah. Pinkett Smith spoke highly of the cast reflecting their characters in real life, stating that they are all women who love other women and work to empower each other, a feature that she notes as rare in Hollywood.

=== Later career (2018–present) ===
Beginning in May 2018, Pinkett Smith along with her mother Adrienne Banfield-Norris and her daughter Willow Smith have hosted the Facebook Watch talk show Red Table Talk, which focuses on a wide range of topics. In a positive review, USA Today's Maeve McDermott praised the series for its "insightful guests, no-holds-barred topics and Smith's magnetic hosting presence". In 2021, Time magazine named Pinkett Smith and her co-hosts to its list of the 100 most influential people in the world; they were chosen by comedian Tiffany Haddish. In 2021, Red Table Talk won a Daytime Emmy Award in the outstanding informative talk show category.

Pinkett Smith narrated and produced the 2023 docu-series African Queens, which premiered on Netflix. The first season focused on Njinga, Queen of Ndongo and Matamba while the second season focused on Ptolemaic Egyptian Queen Cleopatra VII. Pinkett Smith's memoir Worthy was published in October 2023. The book covers her journey from suicidal depression to self-acceptance and spiritual healing. It also offers insight to her difficult childhood, friendship with rapper Tupac Shakur, unconventional marriage, and her reaction to Will Smith slapping Chris Rock at the Oscars.

== Other ventures ==
=== Music ===
I listened to all kinds of metal as a kid. Metallica, Guns N' Roses. I would always look at Axl Rose and say, "Why aren't there any chicks out there doing this now?" I always wanted an opportunity to get out there and rock out.

— Pinkett Smith on why she created Wicked Wisdom

Under the name Jada Koren, Pinkett Smith formed the metal band Wicked Wisdom in 2002. The band consists of Pinkett Smith performing lead vocals, Pocket Honore (guitar, vocals), Cameron "Wirm" Graves (guitar, keyboard, vocals), and Rio (bass, vocals). The band is managed by James Lassiter and Miguel Melendez of Overbrook Entertainment, a company co-founded by Pinkett Smith's husband Will Smith.

The band's self-titled debut album was released on February 21, 2006, by Pinkett Smith's production company 100% Womon and Suburban Noize Records. Will Smith served as the project's executive producer. The album made it to Billboard's Top Heatseekers chart, and peaked at number 44 during the week of March 11, 2006. AllMusic reviewer Alex Henderson said of the album, "[Pinkett Smith] shows herself to be an expressive, commanding singer" and that "[Wicked Wisdom] shows considerable promise". The band promoted the album in 2006, touring with heavy metal band Sevendust.

==== Onyx Hotel Tour ====
Wicked Wisdom landed a slot on Britney Spears' Onyx Hotel Tour in 2004, one of the year's highest-profile tours. The band opened for Spears for eight dates in April and May 2004, during the European leg of the tour.

==== Ozzfest 2005 ====
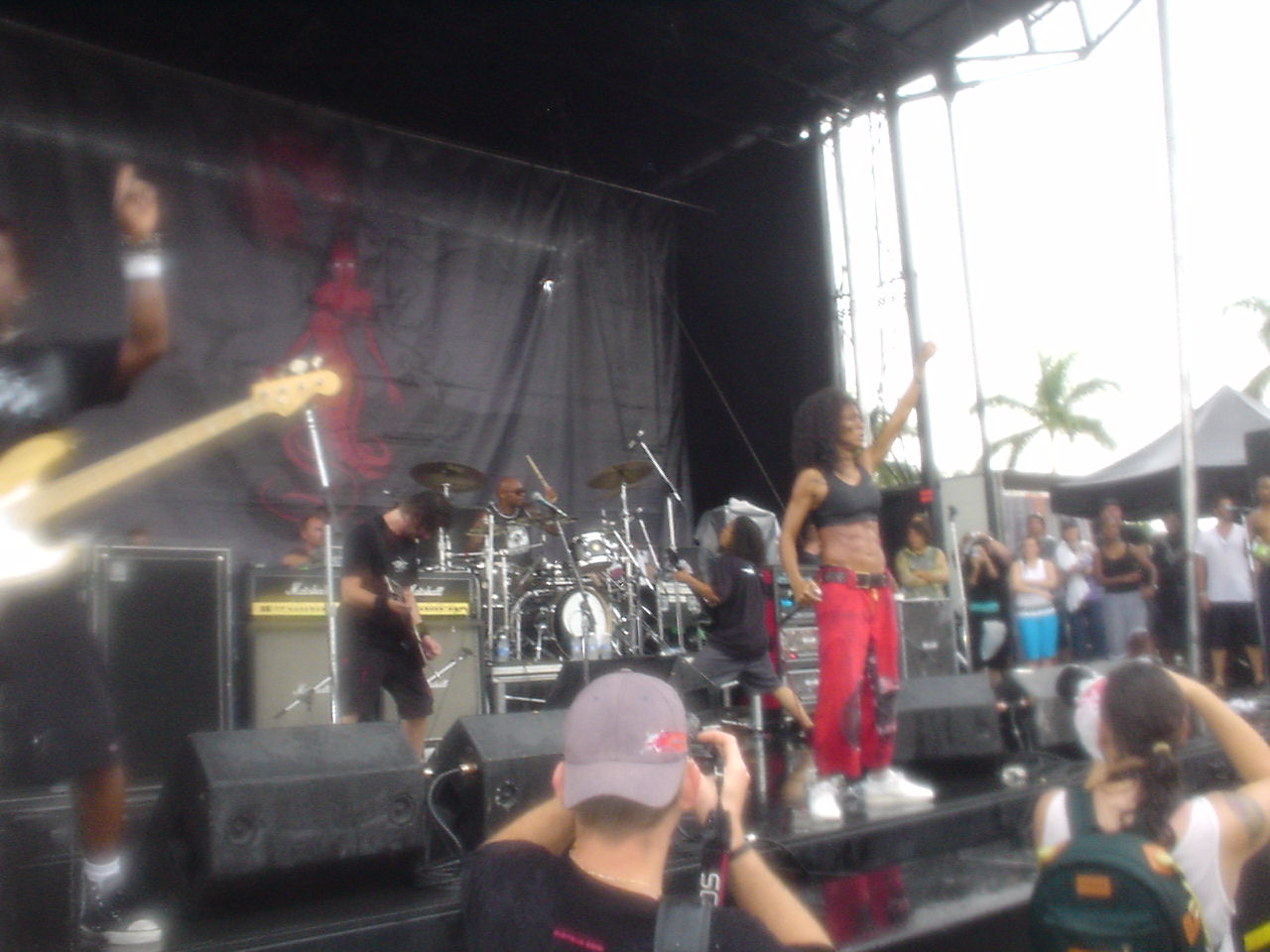
Wicked Wisdom performing at Ozzfest 2005

In 2005, Sharon Osbourne saw Wicked Wisdom perform at a small nightclub in Los Angeles. She said: "I was blown away. When you see and hear Jada with her band it's apparent that she has nothing but love and respect for this genre of music". In May 2005, organizers announced Wicked Wisdom would perform on the second stage of 2005's Ozzfest. Aware of questions about the band's addition to Ozzfest, Pinkett Smith said, "I'm not here asking for any favors. You've got to show and prove. And not every audience is going to go for it." Wicked Wisdom's guitarist Pocket Honore said while early dates of the tour were rocky, "once word got out that we weren't a joke, people started coming out and by the sixth or seventh gig we were on fire". Pinkett Smith agreed, saying, "After seven dates within the Ozzfest tour, the whole attitude of it started to turn around once the word of mouth started getting out."

=== Business ===
After opening her music company 100% Womon Productions, Pinkett Smith created her own fashion label, Maja, in 1994. The clothing line features women's T-shirts and dresses embellished with the slogan "Sister Power", sold primarily through small catalogs. In 2003, Pinkett Smith and Smith helped to create the television series All of Us, which aired on UPN/The CW. Pinkett Smith published her first children's book, Girls Hold Up This World, in 2005. "I wrote the book for Willow and for her friends and for all the little girls in the world who need affirmation about being female in this pretty much masculine world. I really tried to capture different sides of femininity. I want girls in the world to feel powerful, to know they have the power to change the world in any way they wish."

In 2005, Pinkett Smith became one of many celebrities to invest a combined total of US$10 million in Carol's Daughter, a line of beauty products created by Lisa Price. She became a spokesman for the beauty line, and said, "To be a part of another African American woman's dream was just priceless to me." In 2015, the Smith couple were among the founding investors of an energy storage company. Pinkett-Smith produces films through jointly owned production companies with husband Will Smith under Overbrook Entertainment and Westbrook Inc. In 2019, Westbrook Entertainment was acquired by Mark Gillespie's Three Six Zero, diversifying that talent management company.

=== Philanthropy ===
In 1997, Pinkett Smith was the emcee of the Million Woman March in Philadelphia. Together with Will, Pinkett Smith has created the Will and Jada Smith Family Foundation in Baltimore, Maryland, a charity that focuses on youth in urban inner cities and family support. Her aunt, Karen Banfield Evans, is the foundation's executive director. The charity was awarded the David Angell Humanitarian Award by The American Screenwriters Association (ASA) in 2006. The Will and Jada Smith Family Foundation has provided grants to non-profit organizations such as YouthBuild, and Pinkett Smith has made personal donations to organizations such as Capital K-9s.

After meeting Tom Cruise during the filming of Collateral (2004), Pinkett Smith and Will Smith donated $20,000 to the Hollywood Education and Literacy Program (HELP), Scientology's basis for homeschooling. Pinkett Smith reported using Scientology's Study Technology to homeschool her children, and she credited Scientology's Narconon with helping her father with his addiction. In 2006, Pinkett Smith donated $1 million to her high school alma mater, the Baltimore School for the Arts, and dedicated the new theater to her classmate and close friend Tupac Shakur.

When Pinkett Smith's aunt, Karen Banfield Evans, was diagnosed with lupus, the Will and Jada Smith Family Foundation, in association with the Lupus Foundation of America and Maybelline, held the first annual "Butterflies Over Hollywood" event on September 29, 2007, at the El Rey Theatre in Los Angeles. The event raised funds for LFA public and professional educational programs. The Will and Jada Smith Family Foundation was presented with an award in 2007 at the 4th Annual Lupus Foundation of America Awards.

In 2012, on behalf of PETA, Pinkett Smith wrote a letter to Baltimore's mayor, asking that the visiting Ringling Brothers Circus "comply with Baltimore's absolute prohibition of the use of devices such as bullhooks" and not harm the elephants. In 2013, she appeared in a video clip for Gucci's "Chime for Change" campaign that aims to raise funds and awareness of women's issues globally.

== Personal life ==
=== Relationships ===
In the early 1990s, Pinkett Smith dated former basketball player Grant Hill while he attended Duke University. Pinkett Smith had a close friendship with rapper Tupac Shakur which was formed when they were attending the Baltimore School for the Arts. Pinkett Smith secured Shakur a guest appearance on A Different World in 1993. She appeared in his music videos "Keep Ya Head Up" (1993) and "Temptations" (1995). She also came up with the concept for his "California Love" (1995) music video and had intended to direct it, but she removed herself from the project. In 1995, she contributed $100,000 towards Shakur's bail as he awaited an appeal on his sexual abuse conviction. She later revealed that she turned down a marriage proposal from Shakur while he was incarcerated at Rikers Island in 1995. Speaking about her, Shakur stated: "Jada is my heart. She will be my friend for my whole life. We'll be old together. Jada can ask me to do anything and she can have it." Pinkett Smith stated in the 2003 documentary Tupac: Resurrection that Shakur was "one of my best friends. He was like a brother. It was beyond friendship for us. The type of relationship we had, you only get that once in a lifetime."

=== Marriage to Will Smith ===
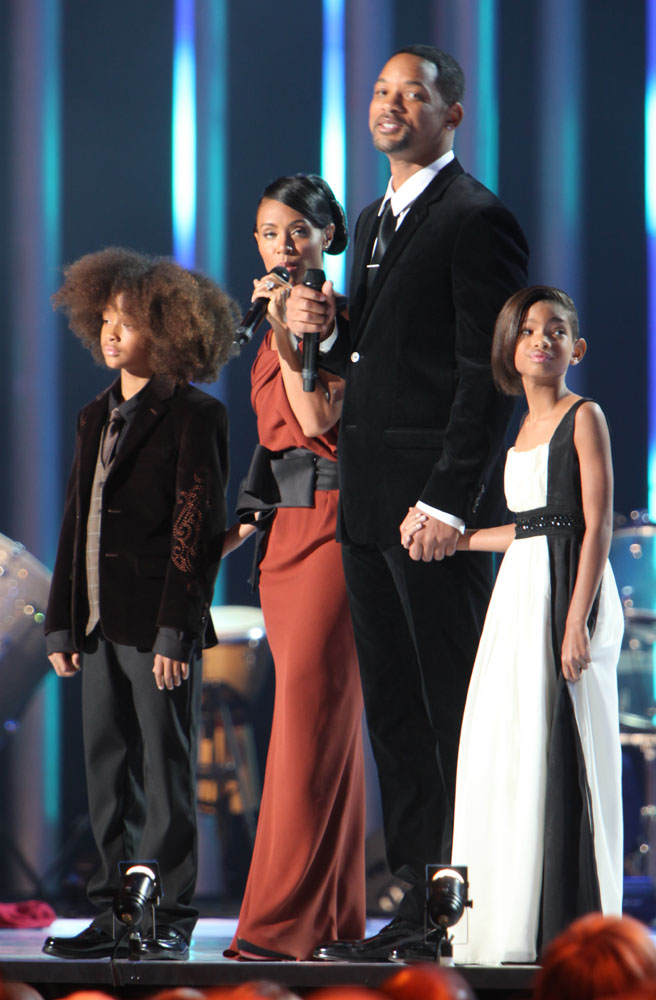
Pinkett Smith with her husband and children at the 2009 Nobel Peace Prize Concert

Pinkett Smith has remained close to her mother Adrienne Banfield-Norris, and said, "A mother and daughter's relationship is usually the most honest, and we are so close." She also added: "[My mother] understood what I wanted and never stood in my way." She participated as the maid of honor in Banfield-Norris's 1998 wedding to Paul Jones, a telecommunications executive.

She met Will Smith in 1994 on the set of Smith's television show The Fresh Prince of Bel-Air, when she auditioned for the role of his character's girlfriend, Lisa Wilkes. She was considered too short and the role went to actress Nia Long. Will and Jada later began dating after his divorce from Sheree Fletcher was finalized in 1995. Prior to this, Will had developed an attraction to Jada, but did not act on it. Jada eventually moved from her hometown of Baltimore to California to be with him. On December 31, 1997, while Jada was three months pregnant, about 100 guests attended their wedding at The Cloisters, near her hometown of Baltimore, Maryland. Regarding her marriage, Jada said that they are "private people" and told one interviewer, "I will throw my career away before I let it break up our marriage. I made it clear to Will. I'd throw it away completely". She later revealed that she "never wanted to be married," but as a young and pregnant actress she felt pressured and her mother urged her to get married.

They have two children, Jaden Christopher Syre Smith (born 1998), and Willow Camille Reign Smith (born 2000). She is also the stepmother of Trey Smith, her husband's son from a previous marriage. Will commented in 2008 on their parenting styles: "We're not strict but we definitely believe it's a very important component for rearing children. It creates safety for them. They understand that they need guidance." The family resides in a 27,000 square foot (2,500 m^{2}) home, on 100 acres (40 ha), in Malibu. In May 2014, Moisés Arias, who was 20 at the time, was photographed shirtless in a bed with then-13-year-old Willow Smith. The photo triggered an investigation into the family by the Los Angeles County Department of Children and Family Services.

In April 2013, Pinkett Smith caused many to believe she and her husband were in an open marriage after stating in an interview: "I've always told Will, 'You can do whatever you want as long as you can look at yourself in the mirror and be okay'. Because at the end of the day, Will is his own man. I'm here as his partner, but he is his own man". However, she denied such, clarifying her statements on Facebook, writing: "Open marriage? The statement I made in regard to, 'Will can do whatever he wants', has illuminated the need to discuss the relationship between trust and love and how they co-exist".

=== Entanglement ===
In June 2020, singer and rapper August Alsina—a friend of Pinkett Smith's son Jaden—said that he and Pinkett Smith had been involved in an adulterous affair in 2016, when he was 23 years old and she was 44. He also claimed that the affair happened with Will Smith's permission. A spokesman for Pinkett Smith denied the claims, saying they were "absolutely not true". On July 10, during an episode of Red Table Talk featuring her husband, Pinkett Smith confirmed an "entanglement" with Alsina during their separation, although not with his permission. Pinkett Smith said that Alsina misconstrued it as permission because she and her husband were "separated amicably". She eventually got back together with her husband after breaking off the relationship with Alsina and stated she has not spoken to him since.

Pinkett Smith's use of the word "entanglement" went viral on the Internet. In 2021, Will Smith stated that Pinkett Smith "never believed in conventional marriage" and that both of them have had sexual relationships outside of their marriage. In October 2023, Pinkett Smith stated that she and Smith had been separated since 2016, though they have no intention to divorce.

=== Alopecia and slap incident ===
In 2018, Pinkett Smith revealed that she had been diagnosed with the autoimmune disease alopecia areata. Despite having many medical tests, she said she has not been able to find the cause of her alopecia, and that she suspects it might be stress. She shared a video on her Instagram account in December 2021 showing herself with a shaved head, saying: "Now at this point, I can only laugh" (...) "Mama's gonna have to take it down to the scalp so nobody thinks she got brain surgery or something. Me and this alopecia are going to be friends... period!". A joke by Chris Rock at the 94th Academy Awards referring to Pinkett Smith's hair resulted in Will Smith angrily slapping Rock in retaliation.

=== Sexuality ===
In her 2023 memoir Worthy, Pinkett noted that "there have always been rumors" that she is gay, though she attributes them to having been seen dancing at LGBTQ+ clubs in Los Angeles in the 1990s. She does not deny, however, having experimented with intimacy with women, stating, "The truth is that during those early years of exploration in Hollywood, I had a few sexual experiences with women, only to realize that when it comes to sex, I love men...my belief is--women are the most amazing creatures on the planet, and I hold reverence for women through my friendships."

== Filmography ==
=== Film ===
Year	Title	Role	Notes
1992	Moe's World	Natalie	Television film
1993	Menace II Society	Ronnie	
1994	The Inkwell	Lauren Kelly	
1994	Jason's Lyric	Lyric	
1994	A Low Down Dirty Shame	Peaches	
1995	Demon Knight	Jeryline	
1996	The Nutty Professor	Carla Purty	
1996	If These Walls Could Talk	Patti	Television film
1996	Set It Off	Lida "Stony" Newsom	
1997	Scream 2	Maureen Evans	Cameo; Credited as "Jada Pinkett"
1998	Woo	Woo	
1998	Blossoms and Veils	Raven	Short film
1998	Return to Paradise	M.J. Major	
1998	Welcome to Hollywood	Jada Pinkett Smith	Cameo
1999	Princess Mononoke	Toki	Voice; English dub
2000	Bamboozled	Sloan Hopkins	
2001	Kingdom Come	Charisse Slocumb	
2001	Ali	Sonji Roi	
2003	Maniac Magee	Amanda Beale	Television film
2003	The Matrix Reloaded	Niobe	
2003	The Matrix Revolutions	Niobe	
2003	Ride or Die	—N/a	Executive producer
2004	Collateral	Annie Farrell	
2005	Madagascar	Gloria	Voice
2005	A Christmas Caper	Gloria	Uncredited voice
2007	Reign Over Me	Janeane Johnson	
2008	The Women	Alex Fisher	
2008	The Human Contract	Rita	also writer and director
2008	The Secret Life of Bees	—N/a	Executive producer
2008	Madagascar: Escape 2 Africa	Gloria	Voice
2009	Merry Madagascar	Gloria	Voice
2010	The Karate Kid	—N/a	Producer
2012	Men in Black 3	Party Guest	Uncredited
2012	Madagascar 3: Europe's Most Wanted	Gloria	Voice
2013	Madly Madagascar	Gloria	Voice
2013	After Earth	—N/a	Producer
2014	Penguins of Madagascar	Gloria	Voice cameo
2014	Annie	—N/a	Producer
2015	Magic Mike XXL	Rome	
2016	Bad Moms	Stacy	
2017	Girls Trip	Lisa Cooper	
2019	Angel Has Fallen	FBI Agent Helen Thompson	
2020	Life in a Year	—N/a	Executive producer
2021	The Matrix Resurrections	Niobe	

=== Television ===
Year	Title	Role	Notes
1990	True Colors	Beverly	Episode: "Life with Fathers"Credited as "Jada Pinkett"
1991	21 Jump Street	Nicole	Episode: "Homegirls"; Credited as "Jada Pinkett"
1991	Doogie Howser, M.D.	Trish Andrews	Episode: "Air Doogie"; Credited as "Jada Pinkett"
1991–1993	A Different World	Lena James	46 Episodes
2009–2011	Hawthorne	Christina Hawthorne	Lead role Chief Nursing Officer-Director Of Nursing- President/ Chief Operations Officer COO
2014–2017	Gotham	Fish Mooney	Series regular (season 1); Special guest star (seasons 2–3)
2017	Carpool Karaoke: The Series	Herself	Episode: "Queen Latifah & Jada Pinkett Smith"
2018–2022	Red Table Talk	Herself	Host and executive producer
2019	Today	Herself	"Jada Pinkett Smith Opens Up About Red Table Talk And Her Family"
2019	Jimmy Kimmel Live	Herself	"Jada Pinkett Smith on Aladdin, Vacations with Husband Will & Pornography"
2019	The Late Show with Stephen Colbert	Herself	"Jada Pinkett Smith: Happiness Is About Peace"
2019	CBS This Morning	Herself	"Jada Pinkett Smith speaks to her 20-year-old self, talks new movie and Red Table Talk"
2022	The Equalizer	Jessie "The Worm" Cook	Episode: "Legacy"
2023	African Queens	Herself	Narrator and executive producer
2026	A Different World	Lena James	Episode: "Romancing the Unknown"

=== Video games ===
Year	Title	Role	Notes
2003	Enter the Matrix	Niobe	Live-action cutscenes, voice, and motion-capture performance

== Discography ==
=== With Wicked Wisdom ===
- My Story (2004)
- Wicked Wisdom (2006)

=== As featured artist ===
- "1000 Kisses" (Will Smith featuring Jada Pickett Smith, Born to Reign, 2002)

== Awards and nominations ==
Year	Award	Category	Work	Result	Ref
1996	Fangoria Chainsaw Awards	Fangoria Chainsaw Award for Best Actress	Tales from the Crypt: Demon Knight	Won	
1998	Blockbuster Entertainment Awards	Favorite Supporting Actress – Horror	Scream 2	Nominated	
2001	NAACP Image Awards	Outstanding Supporting Actress in a Motion Picture	Ali	Nominated	
2003	Teen Choice Awards	Choice Movie Actress – Drama/Action Adventure	The Matrix Reloaded	Nominated	
2003	NAACP Image Awards	Outstanding Supporting Actress in a Motion Picture	The Matrix Revolutions	Nominated	
2004	Interactive Achievement Awards	Outstanding Achievement in Character Performance – Female	Enter the Matrix	Won	
2006	NAACP Image Awards	Outstanding Literary Work – Children's	"Girls Hold Up This World"	Won	
2010	NAACP Image Awards	Outstanding Actress in a Drama Series	Hawthorne	Won	
2010	Prism Awards	Performance in a Drama Episode	Hawthorne	Nominated	
2010	Tony Awards	Best Musical	Fela!	Nominated	
2013	Behind the Voice Actors Awards	Best Vocal Ensemble in a Feature Film	Madagascar 3: Europe's Most Wanted	Nominated	
2015	NAACP Image Awards	Outstanding Supporting Actress in a Drama Series	Gotham	Nominated	
2015	People's Choice Awards	Favorite Actress in a New TV Series	Gotham	Nominated	
2019	Daytime Emmy Awards	Outstanding Informative Talk Show	Red Table Talk	Nominated	
2019	MTV Movie & TV Awards	MTV Trailblazer Award	Jada Pinkett Smith	Won	
2019	NAACP Image Awards	Outstanding Host in a Talk, Reality, News/ Information or Variety (Series or Special)	Red Table Talk	Won	
2020	NAACP Image Awards	Outstanding Host in a Talk, Reality, News/ Information or Variety (Series or Special)	Red Table Talk	Won	
2020	Daytime Emmy Awards	Outstanding Informative Talk Show	Red Table Talk	Nominated	
2020	Daytime Emmy Awards	Outstanding Informative Talk Show Host	Red Table Talk	Nominated	
2021	NAACP Image Awards	Outstanding Host in a Talk, Reality, News/ Information or Variety (Series or Special)	Red Table Talk	Nominated	
2021	Daytime Emmy Awards	Outstanding Informative Talk Show	Red Table Talk	Won	
2021	Daytime Emmy Awards	Outstanding Informative Talk Show Host	Red Table Talk	Nominated	
2021	Daytime Emmy Awards	Outstanding Informative Talk Show	Red Table Talk : The Estefans	Nominated	
2021	Daytime Emmy Awards	Outstanding Daytime Non-fiction Special	Red Table Talk: Will Smith's Red Table Takeover: Resolving Conflict	Nominated	

== Books ==
- Pinkett Smith, Jada (with Donyelle Kennedy-Mccullough) (2005). Girls Hold Up This World. New York: Cartwheel. ISBN 9780439087933. (Children's Book).
- Pinkett Smith, Jada (2023). Worthy. New York: Dey St. ISBN 9780063320680. OCLC 1401246846.

== See also ==
- Chris Rock–Will Smith slapping incident – Live-television incident in 2022
