= Straight-line program =

In computer science, a straight-line program is, informally, a program that does not contain any loop or any test, and is formed by a sequence of steps that apply each an operation to previously computed elements.

This article is devoted to the case where the allowed operations are the operations of a group, that is multiplication and inversion. More specifically a straight-line program (SLP) for a finite group G = ⟨S⟩ is a finite sequence L of elements of G such that every element of L either belongs to S, is the inverse of a preceding element, or the product of two preceding elements. An SLP L is said to compute a group element g ∈ G if g ∈ L, where g is encoded by a word in S and its inverses.

Intuitively, an SLP computing some g ∈ G is an efficient way of storing g as a group word over S; observe that if g is constructed in i steps, the word length of g may be exponential in i, but the length of the corresponding SLP is linear in i. This has important applications in computational group theory, by using SLPs to efficiently encode group elements as words over a given generating set.

Straight-line programs were introduced by Babai and Szemerédi in 1984 as a tool for studying the computational complexity of certain matrix group properties. Babai and Szemerédi prove that every element of a finite group G has an SLP of length O(log^{2}|G|) in every generating set.

An efficient solution to the constructive membership problem is crucial to many group-theoretic algorithms. It can be stated in terms of SLPs as follows. Given a finite group G = ⟨S⟩ and g ∈ G, find a straight-line program computing g over S. The constructive membership problem is often studied in the setting of black box groups. The elements are encoded by bit strings of a fixed length. Three oracles are provided for the group-theoretic functions of multiplication, inversion, and checking for equality with the identity. A black box algorithm is one which uses only these oracles. Hence, straight-line programs for black box groups are black box algorithms.

Explicit straight-line programs are given for a wealth of finite simple groups in the online ATLAS of Finite Groups.

== Definition ==
=== Informal definition ===
Let G be a finite group and let S be a subset of G. A sequence L = (g_{1},...,g_{m}) of elements of G is a straight-line program over S if each g_{i} can be obtained by one of the following three rules:

1. g_{i} ∈ S
2. g_{i} = g_{j} $\cdot$ g_{k} for some j,k < i
3. g_{i} = g^{−1}_{j} for some j < i.

The straight-line cost c(g|S) of an element g ∈ G is the length of a shortest straight-line program over S computing g. The cost is infinite if g is not in the subgroup generated by S.

A straight-line program is similar to a derivation in predicate logic. The elements of S correspond to axioms and the group operations correspond to the rules of inference.

=== Formal definition ===
Let G be a finite group and let S be a subset of G. A straight-line program of length m over S computing some g ∈ G is a sequence of expressions (w_{1},...,w_{m}) such that for each i, w_{i} is a symbol for some element of S, or w_{i} = (w_{j},-1) for some j < i, or w_{i} = (w_{j},w_{k}) for some j,k < i, such that w_{m} takes upon the value g when evaluated in G in the obvious manner.

The original definition appearing in requires that G =⟨S⟩. The definition presented above is a common generalisation of this.

From a computational perspective, the formal definition of a straight-line program has some advantages. Firstly, a sequence of abstract expressions requires less memory than terms over the generating set. Secondly, it allows straight-line programs to be constructed in one representation of G and evaluated in another. This is an important feature of some algorithms.

== Examples ==
The dihedral group D_{12} is the group of symmetries of a hexagon. It can be generated by a 60 degree rotation ρ and one reflection λ. The leftmost column of the following is a straight-line program for λρ^{3}:

1. λ
2. ρ
3. ρ^{2}
4. ρ^{3}
5. λρ^{3}
1. λ is a generator.
2. ρ is a generator.
3. Second rule: (2).(2)
4. Second rule: (3).(2)
5. Second rule: (1).(4)

In S_{6}, the group of permutations on six letters, we can take α=(1 2 3 4 5 6) and β=(1 2) as generators. The leftmost column here is an example of a straight-line program to compute (1 2 3)(4 5 6):

1. α
2. β
3. α^{2}
4. α^{2}β
5. α^{2}βα
6. α^{2}βαβ
7. α^{2}βαβα^{2}βαβ
1. (1 2 3 4 5 6)
2. (1 2)
3. (1 3 5)(2 4 6)
4. (1 3 5 2 4 6)
5. (1 4)(2 5 3 6)
6. (1 4 2 5 3 6)
7. (1 2 3)(4 5 6)
1. α is a generator
2. β is a generator
3. Second rule: (1).(1)
4. Second rule: (3).(2)
5. Second rule: (4).(1)
6. Second rule: (5).(2)
7. Second rule: (6).(6)

== Applications ==
Short descriptions of finite groups. Straight-line programs can be used to study compression of finite groups via first-order logic. They provide a tool to construct "short" sentences describing G (i.e. much shorter than |G|). In more detail, SLPs are used to prove that every finite simple group has a first-order description of length O(log|G|), and every finite group G has a first-order description of length O(log^{3}|G|).

Straight-line programs computing generating sets for maximal subgroups of finite simple groups. The online ATLAS of Finite Group Representations provides abstract straight-line programs for computing generating sets of maximal subgroups for many finite simple groups.

Example: The group Sz(32), belonging to the infinite family of Suzuki groups, has rank 2 via generators a and b, where a has order 2, b has order 4, ab has order 5, ab^{2} has order 25 and abab^{2}ab^{3} has order 25. The following is a straight-line program that computes a generating set for a maximal subgroup E_{32}·E_{32}⋊C_{31}. This straight-line program can be found in the online ATLAS of Finite Group Representations.

1. a
2. b
3. ab
4. abb
5. ababb
6. ababbb
7. (abb)^{18}
8. (abb)^{−18}
9. (abb)^{−18}b
10. (abb)^{−18}b(abb)^{18}
11. (ababb)^{14}
12. (ababb)^{−14}
13. (ababb)^{−14}ababbb
14. (ababb)^{−14}ababbb(ababb)^{14}
1. a is a generator.
2. b is a generator.
3. Second rule: (1).(2)
4. Second rule: (3).(2)
5. Second rule: (3).(4)
6. Second rule: (5).(2)
7. Second rule iterated: (4) multiplied 18 times
8. Third rule: (7) inverse
9. Second rule: (8).(2)
10. Second rule: (9).(7)
11. Second rule iterated: (5) multiplied 14 times
12. Third rule: (11) inverse
13. Second rule: (12).(6)
14. Second rule: (13).(11)

== Reachability theorem ==
The reachability theorem states that, given a finite group G generated by S, each g ∈ G has a maximum cost of (1 + lg|G|)^{2}. This can be understood as a bound on how hard it is to generate a group element from the generators.

Here the function lg(x) is an integer-valued version of the logarithm function: for k≥1 let lg(k) = max{r : 2^{r} ≤ k}.

The idea of the proof is to construct a set Z = {z_{1},...,z_{s}} that will work as a new generating set (s will be defined during the process). It is usually larger than S, but any element of G can be expressed as a word of length at most 2|Z| over Z. The set Z is constructed by inductively defining an increasing sequence of sets K(i).

Let K(i) = {z_{1}^{α_{1}}·z_{2}^{α_{2}}·...·z_{i}^{α_{i}} : α_{j} ∈ {0,1}}, where z_{i} is the group element added to Z at the i-th step. Let c(i) denote the length of a shortest straight-line program that contains Z(i) = {z_{1},...,z_{i}}. Let K(0) = {1_{G}} and c(0)=0. We define the set Z recursively:

- If K(i)^{−1}K(i) = G, declare s to take upon the value i and stop.
- Else, choose some z_{i+1} ∈ G\K(i)^{−1}K(i) (which is non-empty) that minimises the "cost increase" c(i+1) − c(i).

By this process, Z is defined in a way so that any g ∈ G can be written as an element of K(i)^{−1}K(i), effectively making it easier to generate from Z.

We now need to verify the following claim to ensure that the process terminates within lg(|G|) many steps:

Claim 1—If i < s then |K(i+1)| = 2|K(i)|.

Proof

It is immediate that |K(i+1)| ≤ 2|K(i)|. Now suppose for a contradiction that |K(i+1)| < 2|K(i)|. By the pigeonhole principle there are k_{1},k_{2} ∈ K(i+1) with k_{1} = z_{1}^{α_{1}}·z_{2}^{α_{2}}·...·z_{i+1}^{α_{i+1}} = z_{1}^{β_{1}}·z_{2}^{β_{2}}·...·z_{i+1}^{β_{i+1}} = k_{2} for some α_{j},β_{j} ∈ {0,1}. Let r be the largest integer such that α_{r} ≠ β_{r}. Assume WLOG that α_{r} = 1. It follows that z_{r} = z_{p}^{−α_{p}}·z_{p-1}^{−α_{p-1}}·...·z_{1}^{−α_{1}}·z_{1}^{β_{1}}·z_{2}^{β_{2}}·...·z_{q}^{β_{q}}, with p,q < r. Hence z_{r} ∈ K(r−1)^{−1}K(r − 1), a contradiction.

The next claim is used to show that the cost of every group element is within the required bound.

Claim 2— c(i) ≤ i ^{2} − i.

Proof

Since c(0)=0 it suffices to show that c(i+1) - c(i) ≤ 2i. The Cayley graph of G is connected and if i < s, K(i)^{−1}K(i) ≠ G, then there is an element of the form g_{1}·g_{2} ∈ G \ K(i)^{−1}K(i) with g_{1} ∈ K(i)^{−1}K(i) and g_{2} ∈ S.

It takes at most 2i steps to generate g_{1} ∈ K(i)^{−1}K(i). There is no point in generating the element of maximum length, since it is the identity. Hence 2i −1 steps suffice. To generate g_{1}·g_{2} ∈ G\K(i)^{−1}K(i), 2i steps are sufficient.

We now finish the theorem. Since K(s)^{−1}K(s) = G, any g ∈ G can be written in the form k^{−1}_{1}·k_{2} with k^{−1}_{1},k_{2} ∈ K(s). By Corollary 2, we need at most s^{2} − s steps to generate Z(s) = Z, and no more than 2s − 1 steps to generate g from Z(s).

Therefore c(g|S) ≤ s^{2} + s − 1 ≤ lg^{2}|G| + lg|G| − 1 ≤ (1 + lg|G|)^{2}.
