= Wicked Wisdom (album) =

Studio album by Wicked Wisdom
- Released: February 21, 2006
- Studio: The Boom Boom Room (Burbank, California)
- Genre: Nu metal
- Length: 33:18
- Label: Suburban Noize/Interscope
- Producers: Ulrich Wild, Jay Baumgardner, Pocket Honore, Will Smith (exec.)

Professional ratings
Review scores
| Source | Rating |
|---|---|
| AllMusic | 3.5/5 stars |

Wicked Wisdom is the second studio album by American nu metal band Wicked Wisdom. Released on February 21, 2006, by Jada Pinkett Smith's production company 100% Womon and Suburban Noize Records, Will Smith served as the project's executive producer. The album made it to Billboard's Top Heatseekers chart, and peaked at number 44 during the week of March 11, 2006. Allmusic reviewer Alex Henderson said of the album, "[Pinkett Smith] shows herself to be an expressive, commanding singer" and that "[Wicked Wisdom] shows considerable promise". The band promoted the album in 2006, touring with heavy metal band Sevendust.

== Track listing ==
- All Songs Written By Jada Koren, Pocket Honore & Cameron Graves
1. Yesterday Don't Mean – 2:29
2. Something Inside of Me – 3:34
3. One – 2:43
4. Bleed All Over Me – 3:19
5. Cruel Intentions – 3:27
6. You Can't Handle – 3:09
7. Forgiven – 4:27
8. Set Me Free – 4:54
9. Don't Hate Me – 2:40
10. Reckoning – 2:36
11. Fakeness (Bonus Track For Japan)

== Personnel ==
- Jada Koren – vocals, bellows
- Pocket Honore – guitar, vocals
- Cameron Graves – guitar, keyboards
- Rio – bass guitar, vocals
- Philip Fisher – drums, percussion

Production

- Produced by Ulrich Wild, Jay Baumgardner and Pocket Honore
- Recorded and engineered by Dan Certa, Sergio Chavez and Ulrich Wild
- Mixed by Jay Baumgardner
- Digital editing: Dan Certa, Sergio Chavez
- Mastered by UE Nastasi
