= Radio 1 =

Radio 1 or Radio One most commonly refers to:

- BBC Radio 1, a music radio station operated by the British public broadcaster
  - BBC Radio 1Xtra, a digital radio station broadcasting Black music
- CBC Radio One, a talk radio station operated by the Canadian public broadcaster

Radio 1 or Radio One may also refer to:

== Stations ==
- NPO Radio 1, a talk radio station operated by the Dutch public broadcaster
- Polskie Radio Program I, a radio station operated by the Polish public broadcaster
- Radio 1, the former name of Nasional FM, Malaysia
- Radio 1 (later One FM), the former name of Singaporean radio station Gold 905
- Radio 1 (Belgium), a talk radio station operated by the Flemish public broadcaster
- Radio 1 (Czech Republic), a commercial music radio station in Prague
- Radio 1 FM (The Gambia), an independent station based in Serrekunda
- Radio 1 (Ghana), a station operated by the Ghana Broadcasting Corporation
- Radio One (India), a commercial radio station in several Indian cities
- Radio One (Lebanon), a defunct Lebanese radio station
- Radio One (Mauritius), a private commercial radio station in Mauritius
- Radio One (New Zealand), a student radio station in Dunedin
- Radio Uno (Chile), a Chilean station playing only national music
- Radyo 1 of the Turkish Radio and Television Corporation
- Rai Radio 1, a talk radio station operated by the Italian public broadcaster
- RTÉ Radio 1, a talk radio station operated by the Irish public broadcaster
- Radio 1 UAE, a CHR radio station operated by the Abu Dhabi Media Network
- Radio-1 (Russia), a defunct Russian radio station
- NHK Radio 1, a Japanese radio station
- KBS Radio 1, a South Korean radio station
  - KBS 1FM, branded as KBS Classic FM, a South Korean radio station

== Networks ==
- Radio 1 (Norway), a network of commercial radio stations in Oslo, Trondheim, Bergen and Stavanger
- Urban One, a U.S. network radio operator, formerly Radio One

== Music ==
- Radio One (album), a 1988 album by the Jimi Hendrix Experience
