= One Year Later =

One Year Later may refer to:

- "One Year Later", a 2025 television episode of Game Changer (game show)
- "One Year Later" (comics), a 2006 comic book storyline event running through the books published by DC Comics.
- One Year Later (film), a 1933 film directed by E. Mason Hopper
- "One Year Later" (Andor), a 2025 television episode of the Disney+ streaming series Andor
- "One Year Later", a song on the 2009 Girls' Generation EP Genie
