= Oneness =

Oneness may refer to:

== Religion and philosophy ==
- Holism
- Nondualism
- Henosis, a concept in Greek mysticism denoting "oneness" or "unity"
- Monism, a metaphysical concept in philosophy
- Meditative absorption, oneness, Samadhi
- Monotheism, the belief that only one deity exists
  - Divine simplicity, doctrine that holds God is without parts
  - Tawhid, Islam's fundamental concept that God is one and single
  - The three oneness, three core assertions in the Baháʼí teachings#Unity
- Oneness Pentecostalism, a movement of nontrinitarian denominations
- Systems thinking

== Economy ==
- Law of one price (LoP), an economic concept which posits that "a good must sell for the same price in all locations".

== Media, arts and entertainment ==
- OneNess, a poet/singer/entertainer (see Poet in the City)
- Oneness idents, used by BBC One TV station between 2017 and 2022
- Oneness (film), a 2024 Indian Meitei-language film

=== In music ===
- Oneness (Carlos Santana album), a 1979 rock album
- GodWeenSatan: The Oneness, the 1990 debut album by American rock band Ween
- Oneness (Jack DeJohnette album), a 1997 jazz album

== See also ==
- One (disambiguation)
