= Vela (satellite) =

Group of satellites to detect nuclear detonations

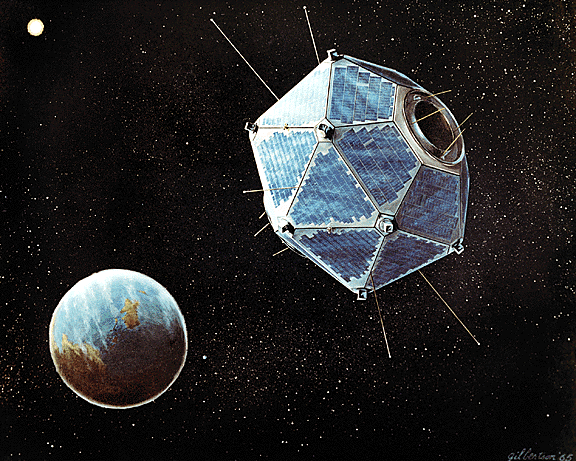
- Artist's impression of Vela 5B satellite in orbit
- Country of origin: United States
- Operator: U.S. Air Force
- Applications: Reconnaissance

Specifications
- Regime: Highly elliptical orbit
- Design life: 15 years

Production
- Status: Disabled
- Launched: 12
- Operational: 0
- Retired: 12
- Maiden launch: Vela 1A
- Last launch: Vela 6B

Related spacecraft
- Derived from: Project Vela and Integrated Operational Nuclear Detection System (IONDS)

Vela was the name of a group of reconnaissance satellites developed as the Vela Hotel element of Project Vela by the United States to detect nuclear detonations and monitor Soviet Union compliance with the 1963 Partial Test Ban Treaty.

Vela started out as a small budget research program in 1959. It ended 26 years later as a successful, cost-effective military space system, which also provided scientific data on natural sources of space radiation. In the 1970s, the nuclear detection mission was taken over by the Defense Support Program (DSP) satellites. In the late 1980s, it was augmented by the Navstar Global Positioning System (GPS) satellites. The program is now called the Integrated Operational NuDet (Nuclear Detonation) Detection System (IONDS).

== Deployment ==
Launch Mission Report: Vela - VB (1980) Official de-classified USAF Titan IIIC/Vela satellite information film reel.

Twelve satellites were built, six of the Vela Hotel design and six of the Advanced Vela design. The Vela Hotel series was to detect nuclear tests in space, while the Advanced Vela series was to detect not only nuclear explosions in space but also in the atmosphere.

All spacecraft were manufactured by TRW and launched in pairs, either on an Atlas-Agena or Titan III-C boosters. They were placed in orbits of 118,000 km (73,000 miles) to avoid particle radiation trapped in the Van Allen radiation belts. Their apogee was about one-third of the distance to the Moon. The first Vela Hotel pair was launched on 17 October 1963, one week after the Partial Test Ban Treaty went into effect, and the last in 1965. They had a design life of six months, but were only actually shut down after five years. Advanced Vela pairs were launched in 1967, 1969, and 1970. They had a nominal design life of 18 months, later changed to seven years. However, the last satellite to be shut down was Vehicle 9 in 1984, which had been launched in 1969 and had lasted nearly 15 years.

The Vela series began with the launch of Vela 1A and 1B on 17 October 1963, a flight also marking the maiden voyage of the Atlas-Agena SLV-3 vehicle. The second pair of satellites launched on 17 July 1964, and the third on 20 July 1965. The last launch miscarried slightly when one Atlas vernier engine shut down at liftoff, while the other vernier operated at above-normal thrust levels. This resulted in a slightly lower than normal inclination for the satellites, however the mission was carried out successfully. The problem was traced to a malfunction of the vernier LOX poppet valve.

Subsequent Vela satellites were switched to the Titan IIIC booster due to their increased weight and complexity. Three more sets were launched on 28 April 1967, 23 May 1969, and 8 April 1970. The last pair of Vela satellites operated until 1985, when they were finally shut down; the Air Force claimed them to be the world's longest operating satellites. They remained in orbit until their orbits decayed at the end of 1992.

Table of Vela launches
Launch date	Satellite	COSPAR ID	Launch vehicle	Serial	Launch mass	Instruments	Satellite photo
17 October 1963	Vela 1A	1963-039A	Atlas-Agena-D	197D	150 kilograms (330 lb)	3 instruments	
17 October 1963	Vela 1B	1963-039C	Atlas-Agena-D	197D	150 kilograms (330 lb)	3 instruments	
17 July 1964	Vela 2A	1964-040A	Atlas-Agena-D	216D	150 kilograms (330 lb)	8 instruments	
17 July 1964	Vela 2B	1964-040B	Atlas-Agena-D	216D	150 kilograms (330 lb)	8 instruments	
20 July 1965	Vela 3A	1965-058A	Atlas-Agena-D	225D	150 kilograms (330 lb)	8 instruments	
20 July 1965	Vela 3B	1965-058B	Atlas-Agena-D	225D	150 kilograms (330 lb)	8 instruments	
28 April 1967	Vela 4A	1967-040A	Titan IIIC	3C-10	231 kilograms (509 lb)	9 instruments	
28 April 1967	Vela 4B	1967-040B	Titan IIIC	3C-10	231 kilograms (509 lb)	9 instruments	
23 May 1969	Vela 5A	1969-046D	Titan IIIC	3C-15	259 kilograms (571 lb)	8 instruments	
23 May 1969	Vela 5B	1969-046E	Titan IIIC	3C-15	259 kilograms (571 lb)	8 instruments	
8 April 1970	Vela 6A	1970-027A	Titan IIIC	3C-18	261 kilograms (575 lb)	8 instruments	
8 April 1970	Vela 6B	1970-027B	Titan IIIC	3C-18	261 kilograms (575 lb)	8 instruments	

Two Guardians reveal a full-scale Vela satellite model.

On May 4, 2021 a full-scale Vela satellite model presented by Northrop Grumman was put on display at the Los Angeles Air Force Base, California.

== Instruments ==
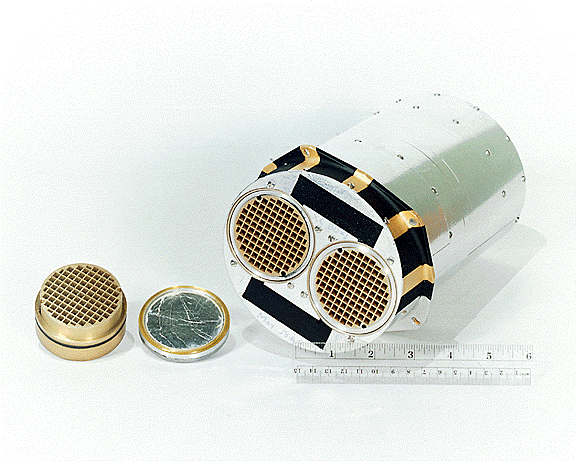
Vela-5B All-Sky Monitor Instrument

The original Vela satellites were equipped with 12 external X-ray detectors and 18 internal neutron and gamma-ray detectors. They were equipped with solar panels generating 90 watts.

The Advanced Vela satellites were additionally equipped with two non-imaging silicon photodiode sensors called bhangmeters which monitored light levels over sub-millisecond intervals. They could determine the location of a nuclear explosion to within about 3,000 miles. Atmospheric nuclear explosions produce a unique signature, often called a "double-humped curve": a short and intense flash lasting around 1 millisecond, followed by a second much more prolonged and less intense emission of light taking a fraction of a second to several seconds to build up. The effect occurs because the surface of the early fireball is quickly overtaken by the expanding atmospheric shock wave composed of ionised gas. Although it emits a considerable amount of light itself it is opaque and prevents the far brighter fireball from shining through. As the shock wave expands, it cools down becoming more transparent allowing the much hotter and brighter fireball to become visible again.

No single natural phenomenon is known to produce this signature, although there was speculation that the Velas could record exceptionally rare natural double events, such as a meteoroid strike on the spacecraft that produces a bright flash or triggering on a lightning superbolt in the Earth's atmosphere, as may have occurred in the Vela incident.

They were also equipped with sensors which could detect the electromagnetic pulse from an atmospheric explosion.

Additional power was required for these instruments, and these larger satellites consumed 120 watts generated from solar panels. Serendipitously, the Vela satellites were the first devices ever to detect cosmic gamma ray bursts.

== Role in discovering gamma-ray bursts ==
On 2 July 1967, at 14:19 UTC, the Vela 4 and Vela 3 satellites detected a flash of gamma radiation unlike any known nuclear weapons signature. Uncertain what had happened but not considering the matter particularly urgent, the team at the Los Alamos Scientific Laboratory, led by Ray Klebesadel, filed the data away for investigation. As additional Vela satellites were launched with better instruments, the Los Alamos team continued to find inexplicable gamma-ray bursts in their data. By analyzing the different arrival times of the bursts as detected by different satellites, the team was able to determine rough estimates for the sky positions of sixteen bursts and definitively rule out a terrestrial or solar origin. Contrary to popular belief, the data was never classified. After thorough analysis, the findings were published in 1973 as an Astrophysical Journal article entitled "Observations of Gamma-Ray Bursts of Cosmic Origin". This alerted the astronomical community to the existence of gamma-ray bursts, now recognised as the most violent events in the universe.

=== Vela 5A and 5B ===
The scintillation X-ray detector (XC) aboard Vela 5A and its twin Vela 5B consisted of two 1 mm thick NaI(Tl) crystals mounted on photomultiplier tubes and covered by a 0.13 mm thick beryllium window. Electronic thresholds provided two energy channels, 3–12 keV and 6–12 keV. In addition to the x-ray Nova announcement indicated above the XC Detector aboard Vela 5A and 5B also discovered and announced the first X-ray burst ever reported. The announcement of this discovery predated the initial announcement of the discovery of gamma-ray bursts by 2 years. In front of each crystal was a slat collimator providing a full width at half maximum (FWHM) aperture of c. 6.1 × 6.1 degrees. The effective detector area was c. 26 cm^{2}. The detectors scanned a great circle every 60 seconds, and covered the whole sky every 56 hours. Sensitivity to celestial sources was severely limited by the high intrinsic detector background, equivalent to about 80% of the signal from the Crab Nebula, one of the brightest sources in the sky at these wavelengths. The Vela 5B satellite X-ray detector remained functional for over ten years.

=== Vela 6A and 6B ===
Like the previous Vela 5 satellites, the Vela 6 nuclear test detection satellites were part of a program run jointly by the Advanced Research Projects of the U.S. Department of Defense and the U.S. Atomic Energy Commission, managed by the U.S. Air Force. The twin spacecraft, Vela 6A and 6B, were launched on 8 April 1970. Data from the Vela 6 satellites were used to look for correlations between gamma-ray bursts and X-ray events. At least two good candidates were found, GB720514 and GB740723. The X-ray detectors failed on Vela 6B on 27 January 1972 and on Vela 6A on 12 March 1972.

== Controversial observations ==
Some controversy still surrounds the Vela program. On 22 September 1979 the Vela 5B satellite (also known as Vela 10 and IRON 6911) detected the characteristic double flash of an atmospheric nuclear explosion near the Prince Edward Islands. Still unsatisfactorily explained, this event has become known as the Vela incident. President Jimmy Carter initially deemed the event to be evidence of a joint Israeli and South African nuclear test, though the now-declassified report of a scientific panel he subsequently appointed while seeking reelection concluded that it was probably not the event of a nuclear explosion, however, this may have been politically motivated. In 2018, a new study confirmed that it is highly likely that it was a nuclear test, conducted by Israel. An alternative explanation involves a magnetospheric event affecting the instruments.

An earlier incident occurred when an intense solar storm on 4 August 1972 triggered the system to event mode as if an explosion occurred, but this was quickly resolved by personnel monitoring the data in real-time.

== See also ==
- Timeline of artificial satellites and space probes
