= Vela 1B =

U.S. reconnaissance satellite

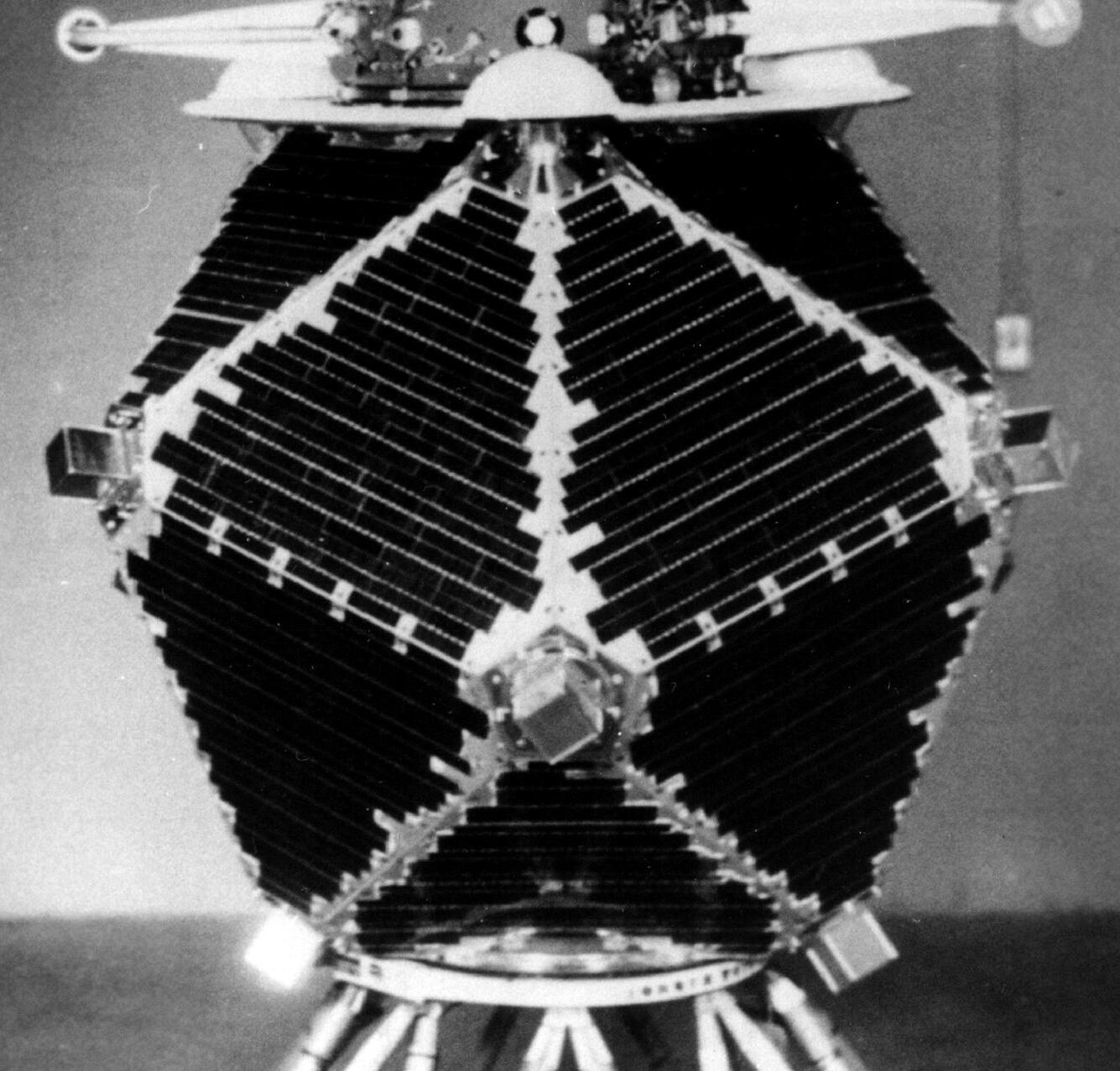
- Vela 1B
- Operator: USAF
- COSPAR ID: 1963-039C
- SATCAT no.: 00692
- Mission duration: 6 months (planned)

Spacecraft properties
- Manufacturer: TRW
- Launch mass: 150 kilograms (330 lb)
- Power: 90 W

Start of mission
- Launch date: October 17, 1963, 02:24
- Rocket: Atlas-LV3 Agena-D
- Launch site: Cape Canaveral LC-13

Orbital parameters
- Reference system: Geocentric
- Regime: Highly Elliptical
- Semi-major axis: 115,746.0 kilometres (71,921.2 mi)
- Perigee altitude: 42,766.0 kilometres (26,573.6 mi)
- Apogee altitude: 175,984.2 kilometres (109,351.5 mi)
- Inclination: 28.7°
- Period: 6,531.6 minutes
- Epoch: June 3, 2018
Instruments
- X-ray/Charged Particle
- Gamma ray/Charged Particle
- Neutron Detectors

Vela 1B was a military satellite developed to detect nuclear detonations to monitor compliance with the 1963 Partial Test Ban Treaty by the Soviet Union.

== Launch ==
Vela 1B was launched on October 17, 1963, from the Cape Canaveral Air Force Station, Florida, by an Atlas-Agena launch vehicle. Vela 1B was launched along with Vela 1A and with ERS-12.

== Mission ==
Vela 1B was one of two spin-stabilized 134 kilograms (295 lb) satellites comprising the first launch in a series of 6 Vela launches. Their objectives were to monitor nuclear weapons explosions in space and to study X-rays, gamma-rays, neutrons, and charged particles as the satellites passed through interplanetary space, the bow shock, the magnetosheath, and the magnetotail. The satellite operated in either a real-time mode (one data frame/sec) or a memory store mode (one data frame every 256 seconds). The spacecraft was operated in the real-time mode about 40% of the time and in the store mode for the rest of the time until the next Vela launch. At this time, tracking priority was given to the new spacecraft, and the older spacecraft was operated in the store mode only. There had been less and less data coverage of these satellites with each succeeding launch.

== Specifications ==
- Height: 1.40 metres (4.6 ft)
- Propulsion: BE-3A AKM
- Stabilization: 120 rpm

== See also ==
- Vela (satellite)
