= Vela incident =

1979 undeclared nuclear explosion

- Date: 22 September 1979
- Time: 00:53 UTC
- Location: Prince Edward Islands; 47°S 40°E
- Participants: Israel (alleged); South Africa (alleged)

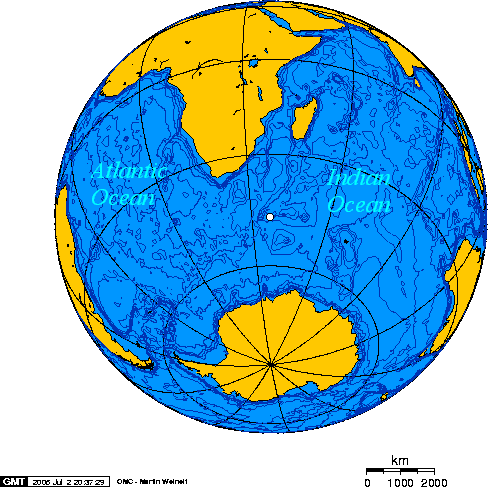
Vela incident (100x100)

The Vela incident was an atmospheric nuclear explosion that occurred on 22 September 1979, near the South African territory of Prince Edward Islands in the Indian Ocean, roughly midway between Africa and Antarctica. This explosion is widely believed to have been an undeclared test of an Israeli nuclear weapon on the ocean surface, carried out with assistance from South Africa. Initially detected as a double flash of light by an American Vela Hotel satellite, further meteorological satellite, hydroacoustic, and radionuclide data support the event's identification as an atmospheric nuclear explosion.

In 1980, US president Jimmy Carter wrote in his diary, "We have a growing belief among our scientists that the Israelis did indeed conduct a nuclear test explosion in the ocean near the southern end of Africa." Experts have suggested the weapon tested was a neutron bomb and/or nuclear artillery round, and that Israel may have carried out other nuclear tests.

It is the second most recent atmospheric nuclear explosion in history, preceding China's Operation 21-716 test in 1980. If conducted by Israel, it was in contravention of Israel's 1964 ratification of the Partial Nuclear Test Ban Treaty.

The previous 41 double flashes detected by the Vela satellites were caused by atmospheric nuclear tests. Some traces of potential nuclear fallout were detected in Australia but not New Zealand. Some information about the event remains classified by the United States government. Its Department of Defense initially suggested a combination of phenomena such as lightning and a meteoroid hitting the satellite.

== Detection ==
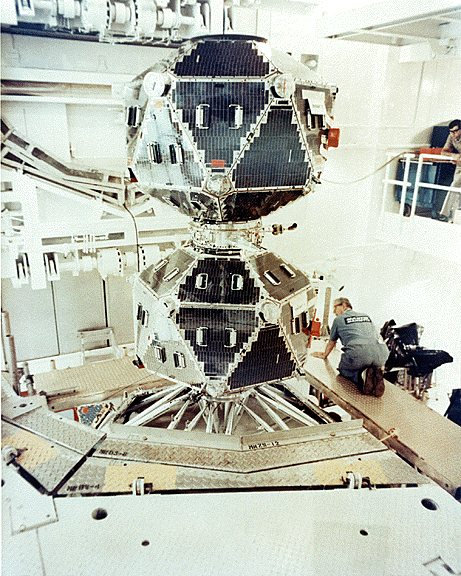
Two Vela 5A/B satellites in a clean room. The two satellites are separated after launch.

The "double flash", then dubbed the South Atlantic flash, was detected on 22 September 1979, at 00:53 UTC, by the American Vela satellite OPS 6911 (also known as Vela 10 and Vela 5B), which carried various sensors designed to detect nuclear explosions that contravened the Partial Nuclear Test Ban Treaty (assuming that it was done by a signatory). (Note: Israel and South Africa were both parties to the treaty.)

As well as being able to detect gamma rays, X-rays, and neutrons, the satellite also contained two silicon solid-state bhangmeter sensors that could detect the dual light flashes associated with an atmospheric nuclear explosion: the initial brief, intense flash, followed by a second, longer flash.

The satellite reported a double flash potentially characteristic of an atmospheric nuclear explosion of two to three kilotons, in the Indian Ocean between the Crozet Islands (a sparsely inhabited French possession) and the Prince Edward Islands (which belong to South Africa) at 47°S 40°E.

Acoustic data of the Sound Surveillance System (SOSUS), established by the United States to detect Soviet submarines, and the Missile Impact Locating System (MILS), designed to detect missile nose cone impact locations of test missiles in the Atlantic and Pacific test ranges, were searched for evidence of a nuclear detonation in the region. These data were found not to have enough substantial evidence of a detonation of a nuclear weapon but a detailed, affirming study regarding MILS data correlating with time and location of the Vela flash was not considered in that finding. United States Air Force (USAF) surveillance aircraft flew 25 sorties over that area of the Indian Ocean from 22 September to 29 October 1979 to carry out atmospheric sampling. Studies of wind patterns confirmed that fallout from an explosion in the southern Indian Ocean could have been carried from there to southwestern Australia. It was reported that low levels of iodine-131 (a short-half-life product of nuclear fission) were detected in sheep in the southeastern Australian states of Victoria and Tasmania soon after the event. Sheep in New Zealand showed no such trace. The Arecibo Observatory, in Puerto Rico, detected an anomalous ionospheric wave during the morning of 22 September 1979, which moved from the southeast to the northwest, an event that had not been observed previously.

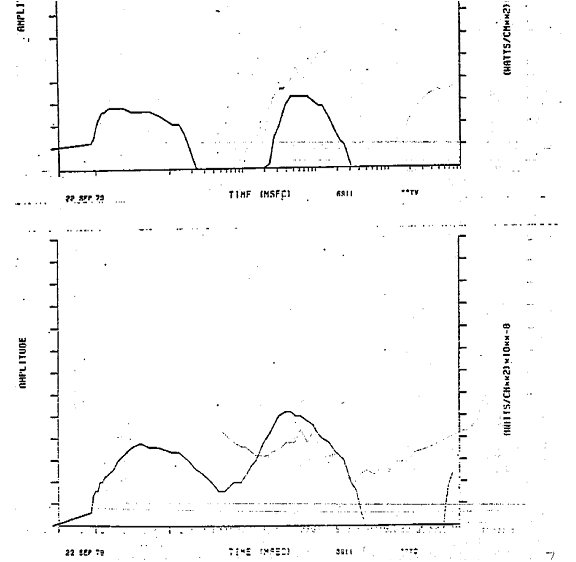
Bhangmeter light patterns detected by a pair of sensors on Vela satellite 6911 on 22 September 1979

After the event was made public, the United States Department of Defense (DOD) clarified that it was either a bomb blast or a combination of natural phenomena, such as lightning, a meteor, or a glint from the sun. The initial assessment by the United States National Security Council (NSC), with technical support from the Naval Research Laboratory, in October 1979 was that the American intelligence community had "high confidence" that the event was a low-yield nuclear explosion, although no radioactive debris had been detected and there were "no corroborating seismic or hydro-acoustic data". A later NSC report revised this position to "inconclusive" about whether a nuclear test had occurred. The report concluded that if a nuclear test had been carried out, responsibility should be ascribed to the South African weapons programme.

=== Office of Science and Technology evaluation ===
The Carter administration asked the Office of Science and Technology Policy (OSTP) to convene a panel of instrumentation experts to re-examine the Vela Hotel 6911 data, and to attempt to find whether the optical flash detected came from a nuclear test. The outcome was politically important to Carter, as his presidency and 1980 re-election campaign prominently featured the themes of nuclear nonproliferation and disarmament. The SALT II treaty had been signed three months earlier, and was pending ratification by the United States Senate, and Israel and Egypt had signed the Camp David Accords six months earlier.

An independent panel of scientific and engineering experts was commissioned by Frank Press, the Science Advisor to President Carter and the chairman of the OSTP, to evaluate the evidence and determine the likelihood that the event was a nuclear detonation. The chairman of this science panel was Jack Ruina of the Massachusetts Institute of Technology, and also the former director of the US Department of Defense's Advanced Research Projects Agency. Reporting in mid-1980, the panel noted that there were some key differences in the detected optical signature from that of an actual nuclear explosion, particularly in the ratio of intensities measured by the two detectors on the satellite. The now-declassified report contains details of the measurements made by the Vela Hotel satellite.

The explosion was picked up by a pair of sensors on only one of the several Vela satellites; other similar satellites were looking elsewhere, or weather conditions precluded them seeing the same event. The Vela satellites had previously detected 41 atmospheric tests—by countries such as France and China—each of which was confirmed by other means, including testing for radioactive fallout. The absence of any such corroboration of a nuclear origin for the Vela incident also suggested that the "double flash" signal was a spurious "zoo" signal of unknown origin, possibly caused by the impact of a micrometeoroid. Such "zoo" signals, which mimicked nuclear explosions, had been received several times earlier.

Their report noted that the flash data contained "many of the features of signals from previously observed nuclear explosions", but that "careful examination reveals a significant deviation in the light signature of the 22 September event that throws doubt on the interpretation as a nuclear event". The best analysis that they could offer of the data suggested that, if the sensors were properly calibrated, any source of the "light flashes" were spurious "zoo events". Thus, their final determination was that while they could not rule out that this signal was of nuclear origin, "based on our experience in related scientific assessments, it is our collective judgment that the September 22 signal was probably not from a nuclear explosion". The Ruina panel did not seriously consider a detailed study done by the Naval Research Laboratory concluding that the strong signals detected by three Ascension Island MILS hydrophones supported a near-surface nuclear blast that could be associated with the observed double flash. The study used French testing in the Pacific as models and placed the site in the vicinity of the Prince Edward Islands.

Victor Gilinsky (former member of the Nuclear Regulatory Commission) argued that the science panel's findings were politically motivated. Some data seemed to confirm that a nuclear explosion was the source for the "double flash" signal. An "anomalous" traveling ionospheric disturbance was measured at the Arecibo Observatory in Puerto Rico at the same time, but many thousands of miles away in a different hemisphere of the Earth. A test in Western Australia conducted a few months later found some increased nuclear radiation levels. A detailed study done by New Zealand's National Radiation Laboratory found no evidence of excess radioactivity, and neither did a government-funded nuclear laboratory in the United States. Los Alamos National Laboratory scientists that worked on the Vela Hotel program have professed their conviction that the Vela Hotel satellite's detectors worked properly.

Leonard Weiss, at the time Staff Director of the Senate Subcommittee on Energy and Nuclear Proliferation, has also raised concerns about the findings of the Ad-Hoc Panel, arguing that it was set up by the Carter Administration to counter embarrassing and growing opinion that it was an Israeli nuclear test. Specific intelligence about the Israeli nuclear program was not shared with the panel, whose report therefore produced the plausible deniability that the administration sought.

== Possible responsible parties ==
If a nuclear explosion did occur, it occurred within a circle of radius 1,500 miles (2,400 kilometers), covering parts of the Indian and South Atlantic Oceans, the southern tip of Africa, and a small part of Antarctica.

=== Israel ===
Well before the Vela incident, American intelligence agencies had made the assessment that Israel probably possessed its own nuclear weapons. According to journalist Seymour Hersh (The Samson Option: Israel's Nuclear Arsenal and American Foreign Policy), the detection was the third joint Israeli–South African nuclear test in the Indian Ocean, and the Israelis had sent two IDF ships and "a contingent of Israeli military men and nuclear experts" for the test. Author Richard Rhodes also concludes the incident was an Israeli nuclear test, conducted in cooperation with South Africa, and that the United States administration deliberately obscured this fact in order to avoid complicating relations with South Africa and Israel. Likewise, Leonard Weiss offers a number of arguments to support the test being Israeli, and claims that successive US administrations continue to cover up the test to divert unwanted attention that may portray its foreign policy in a bad light. Similarly, Professor Avner Cohen concluded that in hindsight, the existence of a cover-up by the United States is unambiguous because there were "at least three independent scientific pieces of evidence unrelated to a satellite that confirm the existence of the explosion."

In the 2008 book The Nuclear Express: A Political History of the Bomb and its Proliferation, Thomas C. Reed and Danny B. Stillman stated their opinion that the "double flash" was the result of a joint South African–Israeli nuclear bomb test. David Albright stated in his article about the "double flash" event in the Bulletin of the Atomic Scientists that "If the 1979 flash was caused by a test, most experts agree it was probably an Israeli test". In 2010, it was revealed that, on 27 February 1980, President Jimmy Carter wrote in his diary, "We have a growing belief among our scientists that the Israelis did indeed conduct a nuclear test explosion in the ocean near the southern end of Africa."

Leonard Weiss, of the Center for International Security and Cooperation at Stanford University, writes: "The weight of the evidence that the Vela event was an Israeli nuclear test assisted by South Africa appears overwhelming."

According to Israeli nuclear program defector Mordechai Vanunu, Israel only gained a production-scale highly enriched uranium plant and possible boosted fission or thermonuclear capability after 1980, implying that the weapon was an unboosted implosion device using plutonium from the Dimona reactor.

Reed has written that he believes the Vela incident was an Israeli neutron bomb test. The test would have gone undetected as the Israelis specifically chose a window of opportunity when, according to the published data, no active Vela satellites were observing the area. Although the decade-old Vela satellite that detected the blast was officially listed as "retired" by the US government, it was still able to receive data. Additionally, the Israelis chose to set off the test during a typhoon. By 1984, according to Vanunu, Israel was mass-producing neutron bombs.

=== South Africa ===
The Republic of South Africa also had a clandestine nuclear weapons programme at the time, despite having acceded to the Partial Test Ban Treaty in 1963, and is located in the region of the incident. Later, concurrently with the end of apartheid, South Africa disclosed most but not all of the information on its nuclear weapons programme. Later inspections by the International Atomic Energy Agency (IAEA) in 1993 concluded that South Africa could not have constructed a nuclear bomb until November 1979, two months after the "double flash" incident, as South Africa did not have enough highly enriched uranium in their possession at the time of the incident. Furthermore, the IAEA reported that all possible South African nuclear bombs had been accounted for. A Central Intelligence Agency (CIA) report dated 21 January 1980, produced for the United States Arms Control and Disarmament Agency, concluded that:

In sum, State/INR finds the arguments that South Africa conducted a nuclear test on 22 September inconclusive, even though, if a nuclear explosion occurred on that date, South Africa is the most likely candidate for responsibility.

United Nations Security Council Resolution 418, of 4 November 1977, introduced a mandatory arms embargo against South Africa, which also required all states to refrain from "any co-operation with South Africa in the manufacture and development of nuclear weapons".

Sasha Polakow-Suransky writes that, in 1979, South Africa was not yet advanced enough to test a nuclear device: "By the first week of October, the State Department had realized that South Africa was probably not the guilty party; Israel was a more likely candidate."

=== Soviet Union ===
In 1979, the Defense Intelligence Agency (DIA) reported that the test might have been a Soviet test done in violation of the 1963 Partial Nuclear Test Ban Treaty (PTBT).

=== India ===
India had carried out a nuclear test in 1974 (codenamed Smiling Buddha). The possibility that India would test a weapon was considered, since it would be possible for the Indian Navy to operate in waters so far south. This was dismissed as unnecessary as India had signed and ratified the Limited Test Ban Treaty (LTBT) in 1963, had complied with it even in its first test, and was not hiding its nuclear weapons capability.

=== Pakistan ===
An interagency intelligence memorandum requested by the United States National Security Council and entitled "The 22 September 1979 Event" analyzed the possibility of Pakistan wanting to prove its nuclear explosive technology in secret.

=== France ===
Since the "double flash", if one existed, could have occurred not very far to the west of the French-owned Kerguelen Islands, it was a possibility that France was testing a small neutron bomb or other small tactical nuclear bomb.

== Subsequent developments ==
1981 Los Alamos report as cited

Since 1980, some small amounts of new information have emerged but most questions remain unanswered. A Los Alamos Scientific Laboratory report from 1981 notes:

TIROS-N plasma data and related geophysical data measured on 22 September 1979 were analyzed to determine whether the electron precipitation event detected by TIROS-N at 00:54:49 universal time could have been related to a surface nuclear burst (SNB). The occurrence of such a burst was inferred from light signals detected by two Vela bhangmeters −2 min before the TIROS-N event. We found the precipitation to be unusually large but not unique. It probably resulted from passage of TIROS-N through the precipitating electrons above a pre-existing auroral arc that may have brightened to an unusually high intensity from natural causes −3 min before the Vela signals. ... We conclude that such an event, although rare, is not unique and, furthermore, that this particular event was associated with an auroral arc that probably existed before the Vela event. Although it may be argued that the segment of the arc sampled by the TIROS-N was intensified by a SNB, we find no evidence to support this thesis or to suggest that the observation was anything but the result of natural magnetospheric processes.

In October 1984, a National Intelligence Estimate on the South African nuclear programme noted:

There is still considerable disagreement within the Intelligence Community as to whether the flash in the South Atlantic detected by a U.S. [redacted] satellite in September 1979 was a nuclear test, and if so, by South Africa. If the latter, the need for South Africa to test a device during the time frame of this Estimate is significantly diminished.

A shorter form of this wording was used in a subsequent National Intelligence Council memorandum of September 1985. In February 1994, Commodore Dieter Gerhardt, a convicted Soviet spy and the commander of South Africa's Simon's Town naval base at the time, talked about the incident upon his release from prison. He said:

Although I was not directly involved in planning or carrying out the operation, I learned unofficially that the flash was produced by an Israeli–South African test, code-named Operation Phenix [sic]. The explosion was clean and was not supposed to be detected. But they were not as smart as they thought, and the weather changed—so the Americans were able to pick it up.

Gerhardt further stated that no South African naval vessels had been involved, and that he had no first-hand knowledge of a nuclear test. In 1993, then President F. W. de Klerk admitted that South Africa had indeed possessed six assembled nuclear weapons, with a seventh in production, but that they had been dismantled (before the first all-race elections of April 1994). There was no mention specifically of the Vela incident or of Israeli cooperation in South Africa's nuclear programme. On 20 April 1997, the Israeli daily newspaper Haaretz quoted the South African deputy foreign minister, Aziz Pahad, as supposedly confirming that the "double flash" from over the Indian Ocean was indeed from a South African nuclear test. Haaretz also cited past reports that Israel had purchased 550 tons of uranium from South Africa for its own nuclear plant in Dimona. In exchange, Israel allegedly supplied South Africa with nuclear weapons design information and nuclear materials to increase the power of nuclear warheads. Pahad's statement was confirmed by the United States embassy in Pretoria, South Africa, but Pahad's press secretary stated that Pahad had said only that "there was a strong rumour that a test had taken place, and that it should be investigated". In other words, he was merely repeating rumours that had been circulating for years. David Albright, commenting on the stir created by this press report, stated:

The US government should declassify additional information about the event. A thorough public airing of the existing information could resolve the controversy.

In October 1999, a white paper that was published by the United States Senate Republican Policy Committee in opposition to the Comprehensive Test Ban Treaty stated:

There remains uncertainty about whether the South Atlantic flash in September 1979 recorded by optical sensors on the U.S. Vela satellite was a nuclear detonation and, if so, to whom it belonged.

In 2003, Stansfield Turner, the Director of Central Intelligence (DCI) during the Carter administration, stated that the Vela detection was of a "man-made phenomenon". In his 2006 book On the Brink, the retired CIA clandestine service officer Tyler Drumheller wrote of his 1983–1988 tour-of-duty in South Africa:

We had operational successes, most importantly regarding Pretoria's nuclear capability. My sources collectively provided incontrovertible evidence that the apartheid government had in fact tested a nuclear bomb in the South Atlantic in 1979, and that they had developed a delivery system with assistance from the Israelis.

In 2010, Jimmy Carter published his White House Diary. In the entry for 22 September 1979, he wrote "There was indication of a nuclear explosion in the region of South Africa—either South Africa, Israel using a ship at sea, or nothing." For 27 February 1980, he wrote "We have a growing belief among our scientists that the Israelis did indeed conduct a nuclear test explosion in the ocean near the southern end of Africa."

Some American information related to this incident has been declassified in the form of heavily redacted reports and memoranda following requests for records made under the US Freedom of Information Act; on 5 May 2006, many of these declassified documents were made available through the National Security Archive. A December 2016 report by William Burr and Avner Cohen of George Washington University's National Security Archive and Nuclear Proliferation International History Project noted that the debate over the South Atlantic flash had shifted over the past few years, in favour of its being a man-made weapon test. The report concluded:

A Central Intelligence Agency–sponsored panel of well-respected scientists concluded that a mysterious flash detected by a U.S. Vela satellite over the South Atlantic on the night of 22 September 1979 was likely a nuclear test.

The newly released research and subsequent report was largely based upon recently declassified documents in files at the National Archives of Gerard C. Smith, a former Ambassador and special envoy on nuclear nonproliferation during Jimmy Carter's presidency. Smith had once said: "I was never able to break free from the thought that the event was a joint operation between Israel and South Africa." The documents cited a June 1980 US State Department report in which Defense Intelligence Agency Vice Director Jack Varona had said the ensuing US investigation was a "white wash, due to political considerations" based on "flimsy evidence". He added that the "weight of the evidence pointed towards a nuclear event" and cited hydroacoustic data analysed by the Naval Research Laboratory. The data, he suggested, involved "signals... unique to nuclear shots in a maritime environment" and emanating from the area of "shallow waters between Prince Edward and Marion Islands, south-east of South Africa". Avner Cohen stated that "Now, 40 years later, there is a scientific and historical consensus that it was a nuclear test and that it had to be Israeli." In 2017, a study in Science & Global Security demonstrated the unlikelihood of a meteoroid collision as the cause of the satellite's reading. In 2018, a new study made the case for the double flash being a nuclear test. A 2022 study examining readings from the NASA satellite Nimbus-7 taken 16 minutes and 44 seconds after the explosion found evidence of a trace left by the blast's shockwave in the ozone layer.

== In popular culture ==
- The West Wing episode "The Warfare of Genghis Khan" includes an element based on the Vela incident.
- The Vela incident plays into the plot of Jonas Jonasson's novel The Girl Who Saved the King of Sweden.

== See also ==
- International Monitoring System—an existing global nuclear weapons test detection system
- Israel–South Africa relations
- Nuclear espionage
- Nuclear weapons of Israel
- Operation Argus; a secret series of United States nuclear tests in the South Atlantic
- South Africa and weapons of mass destruction
