= Vela 2B =

U.S. reconnaissance satellite

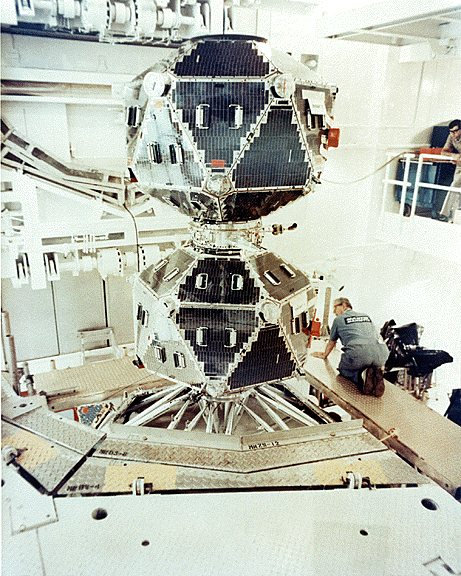
- Vela satellite.
- Operator: USAF
- COSPAR ID: 1964-040B
- SATCAT no.: 837

Spacecraft properties
- Manufacturer: TRW
- Launch mass: 135 kilograms (298 lb)

Start of mission
- Launch date: July 17, 1964, 08:22 UTC
- Rocket: Atlas LV-3A Agena-D
- Launch site: Cape Canaveral LC-13

Orbital parameters
- Reference system: Geocentric
- Regime: Highly Elliptical
- Perigee altitude: 94,436 kilometres (58,680 mi)
- Apogee altitude: 11,775 kilometres (7,317 mi)
- Inclination: 40.8°
- Period: 100,12 hours
- Epoch: July 17, 1964

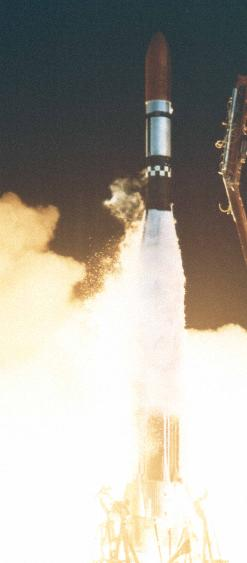
Launch of Vela 2B.

Vela 2B (also known Vela 4, Vela Hotel 4 and OPS 3674) was a U.S. reconnaissance satellite for detecting explosions and nuclear tests on land and in space, the first of the second pair of Vela series satellites, taken together with Vela 2A and ERS 13 satellites. The secondary task of the ship was space research (X-rays, gamma rays, neutrons, magnetic field and charged particles).

The satellite was rotationally stabilized (2 rps). The ship could work in real time mode (one data frame per second) or in data recording mode (one frame every 256 seconds). The first mode was used for the first 40% of the mission's duration. The second one was used until the next pair of Vela satellites were launched.

The ship remains in orbit around Earth.

== Instruments ==
- X-ray and charged particle detector
- Gamma ray detector and charged particles
- Neutron detector
- Electron and proton spectrometer
- Background radiation detector
- Solid state detector
- Geiger-Muller counters
- Magnetometer

== See also ==
- Vela (satellite)
