= Vela 2A =

U.S. reconnaissance satellite

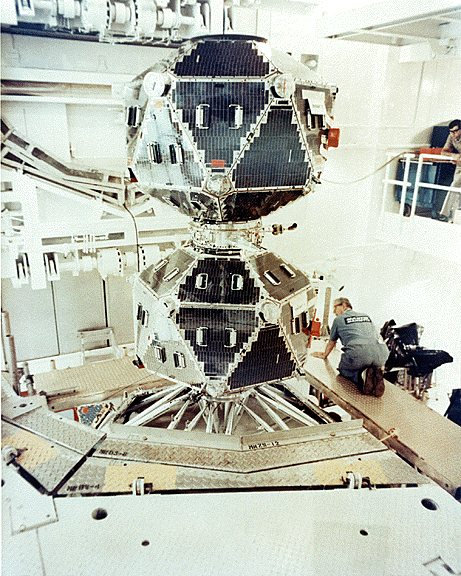
- Vela satellite.
- Operator: USAF
- COSPAR ID: 1964-040A
- SATCAT no.: 836

Spacecraft properties
- Manufacturer: TRW
- Launch mass: 150 kilograms (330 lb)
- Power: 90 W

Start of mission
- Launch date: July 17, 1964, 08:22 UTC
- Rocket: Atlas LV-3A Agena-D
- Launch site: Cape Canaveral LC-13

Orbital parameters
- Reference system: Geocentric
- Regime: Highly Elliptical
- Eccentricity: 0.5262
- Perigee altitude: 45,585 kilometres (28,325 mi)
- Apogee altitude: 161,011 kilometres (100,048 mi)
- Inclination: 75.15°
- Epoch: July 10, 2017

Vela 2A, also known as Vela 3, Vela Hotel 3 and OPS 3662, was a U.S. military satellite developed to detect nuclear detonations to monitor compliance with the 1963 Partial Test Ban Treaty by the Soviet Union. The secondary task of the ship was space research (X-rays, gamma rays, neutrons, magnetic field and charged particles).

== Launch ==
Vela 2A was released on July 17, 1964, from the Cape Canaveral Air Force Station, Florida, through an Atlas-Agena launch vehicle. Vela 2A was launched along with Vela 2B and with ERS 13.

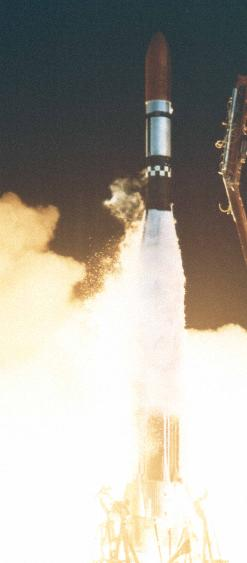
Launch of Vela 2A.

== Capabilities ==
Vela 2A was rotationally stabilized (2 rotations per sec.). The ship could work in real time mode (one data frame per second) or in data recording mode (one frame every 256 seconds). The first mode was used for the first 40% of the mission's duration. The second one was used until the next pair of Vela satellites were launched.

== Instruments ==
- X-ray and charged particle detector
- Gamma ray detector and charged particles
- Neutron detector
- Electron and proton spectrometer
- Background radiation detector
- Solid state detector
- Geiger-Muller counters
- Magnetometer

== See also ==
- Vela 1A
