= Vela 1A =

Nuclear detonation detector

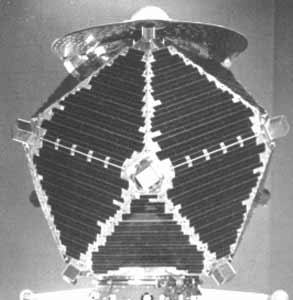
- Vela 1A
- Operator: USAF
- COSPAR ID: 1963-039A
- SATCAT no.: 00674
- Mission duration: 6 months (planned)

Spacecraft properties
- Manufacturer: TRW
- Launch mass: 150 kilograms (330 lb)
- Power: 90 W

Start of mission
- Launch date: October 17, 1963, 02:24
- Rocket: Atlas-LV3 Agena-D
- Launch site: Cape Canaveral LC-13

Orbital parameters
- Reference system: Geocentric
- Regime: Highly Elliptical
- Perigee altitude: 101,081 kilometres (62,809 mi)
- Apogee altitude: 116,582 kilometres (72,441 mi)
- Inclination: 38.7°
- Period: 6,486.2 minutes
- Epoch: October 17, 1963

Vela 1A (or Vela 1) was a US military satellite developed to detect nuclear detonations to monitor compliance with the 1963 Partial Test Ban Treaty.

== Launch ==
Vela 1A was launched on October 17, 1963 from the Cape Canaveral Air Force Station, Florida, by an Atlas-Agena launch vehicle. Vela 1A was launched along with Vela 1B and with ERS 12.

== Mission ==
Vela 1A was a spin-stabilized 124-kg satellite comprising the first launch in a series of six Vela launches. Together with its twin Vela 1B, their objectives were to monitor nuclear weapons explosions in space and to study x-rays, gamma-rays, neutrons, and charged particles as the satellites passed through interplanetary space, the bow shock, the magnetosheath, and the magnetotail.

== See also ==
- Vela (satellite)
