= Vela 5A =

American reconnaissance satellite

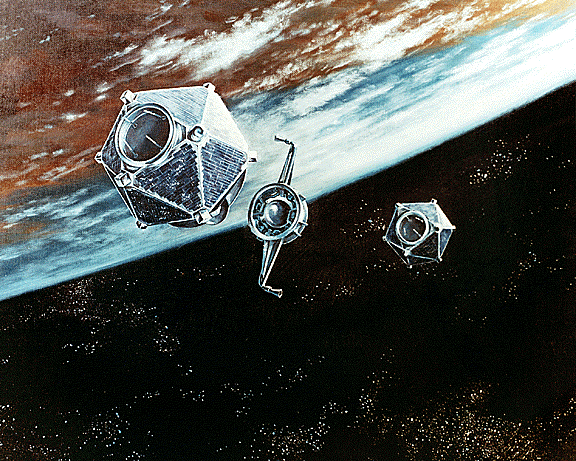
- Post-launch separation of Vela 5A and 5B
- Operator: USAF
- COSPAR ID: 1969-046D
- SATCAT no.: 3954

Spacecraft properties
- Manufacturer: TRW
- Launch mass: 259 kilograms (571 lb)
- Power: 120 W

Start of mission
- Launch date: May 23, 1969, 07:57:01 UTC
- Rocket: Titan III-C 15
- Launch site: Cape Canaveral LC-41

Orbital parameters
- Reference system: Geocentric
- Regime: Highly Elliptical
- Semi-major axis: 117,689 kilometres (73,129 mi)
- Perigee altitude: 29,122.4 kilometres (18,095.8 mi)
- Apogee altitude: 193,514.6 kilometres (120,244.4 mi)
- Inclination: 42°
- Period: 6,696.8 minutes (111.613 h)

Vela 5A (also known Vela 9 and OPS 6909) was an American reconnaissance satellite to detect explosions and nuclear tests on land and in space. It was released together with Vela 5B, OV5 5, OV5 6 and OV5 9.

== Instruments ==
- 2 optical bhangmeters observing the planet
- 12 external X-ray detectors
- 18 internal neutron and gamma-ray detectors

== See also ==
- Vela (satellite)
