= Bhangmeter =

Radiometer to detect atmospheric nuclear detonations

A bhangmeter is a non-imaging radiometer installed on reconnaissance and navigation satellites to detect atmospheric nuclear detonations and determine the yield of the nuclear weapon. They are also installed on some armored fighting vehicles, in particular NBC reconnaissance vehicles, in order to help detect, localise and analyse tactical nuclear detonations. They are often used alongside pressure and sound sensors in this role in addition to standard radiation sensors. Some nuclear bunkers and military facilities may also be equipped with such sensors alongside seismic event detectors.

The bhangmeter was developed at Los Alamos National Laboratory by a team led by Hermann Hoerlin.

== Etymology ==
The name of the detector is a pun which was bestowed upon it by Fred Reines, one of the scientists working on the project. The name is derived from the Urdu/Hindi word "bhang", a locally grown variety of cannabis which is smoked or drunk to induce intoxicating effects, the joke being that one would have to be on drugs to believe the bhangmeter detectors would work properly. This is in contrast to a "bangmeter" one might associate with detection of nuclear explosions.

== History ==
The bhangmeter was invented, and the first proof-of-concept device was built, in 1948 to measure the nuclear test detonations of Operation Sandstone. Prototype and production instruments were later built by EG&G, and the name "bhangmeter" was coined in 1950 by Frederick Reines. Bhangmeters became standard instruments used to observe US nuclear tests. A Mod II bhangmeter was developed to observe the detonations of Operation Buster-Jangle (1951) and Operation Tumbler-Snapper (1952). These tests lay the groundwork for a large deployment of nationwide North American bhangmeters with the Bomb Alarm System (1961–1967).

US president John F. Kennedy and the First Secretary of the Communist Party of the Soviet Union Nikita Khrushchev signed the Partial Test Ban Treaty on August 5, 1963, under the condition that each party could use its own technical means to monitor the ban on nuclear testing in the atmosphere or in outer space.

Bhangmeters were first installed, in 1961, aboard a modified US KC-135A aircraft monitoring the pre-announced Soviet test of Tsar Bomba.

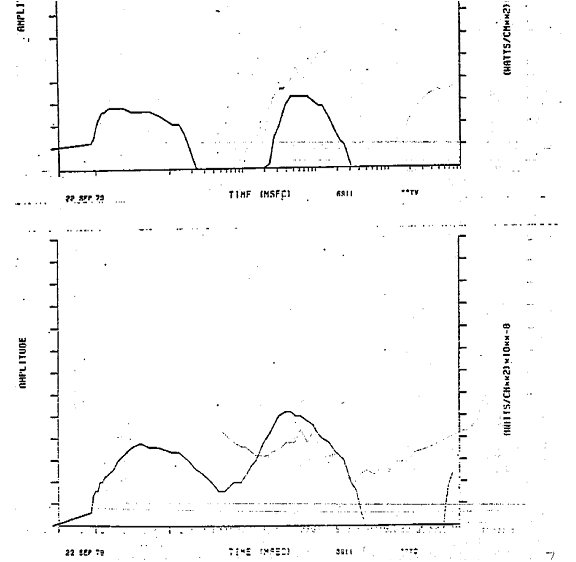
Bhangmeter data collected during the Vela incident in 1979.

The Vela satellites were the first space-based observation devices jointly developed by the U.S. Air Force and the Atomic Energy Commission. The first generation of Vela satellites were not equipped with bhangmeters but with X-ray sensors to detect the intense single pulse of X-rays produced by a nuclear explosion. The first satellites which incorporated bhangmeters were the Advanced Vela satellites.

Since 1980, bhangmeters have been included on US GPS navigation satellites.

== Description ==
Greenhouse George early fireball evolution, showing the initial dimming of the first light pulse

Graph of a nuclear fireball's surface temperature and diameter over time

The silicon photodiode sensors are designed to detect the distinctive bright double pulse of visible light (a.k.a. double flash) that is emitted from atmospheric nuclear weapons explosions. This signature consists of a short and intense flash lasting around 1 millisecond, followed by a second much more prolonged and less intense emission of light taking a fraction of a second to several seconds to build up. This signature, with a double intensity maximum, is characteristic of atmospheric nuclear explosions and is the result of the Earth's atmosphere becoming opaque to visible light and transparent again as the explosion's shock wave travels through it.

The effect occurs because the surface of the early fireball is quickly overtaken by the expanding "case shock", the atmospheric shock wave composed of the ionised plasma of what was once the casing and other matter of the device. Although it emits a considerable amount of light itself, it is opaque and prevents the far brighter fireball from shining through. The net result recorded is a decrease of the light visible from outer space as the shock wave expands, producing the first peak recorded by the bhangmeter.

As it expands, the shock wave cools off and becomes less opaque to the visible light produced by the inner fireball. The bhangmeter starts eventually to record an increase in visible light intensity. The expansion of the fireball leads to an increase of its surface area and consequently an increase of the amount of visible light radiated off to space. The fireball continues to cool down so the amount of light eventually starts to decrease, causing the second peak observed by the bhangmeter. The time between the first and second peaks can be used to determine its nuclear yield.

The effect is unambiguous for explosions below about 30 kilometres (19 mi) altitude, but above this height a more ambiguous single pulse is produced.

== See also ==
- Vela incident
- WC-135 Constant Phoenix
- Nuclear MASINT
- Electro-optical MASINT
