= Atlas-Agena =

American expendable launch system

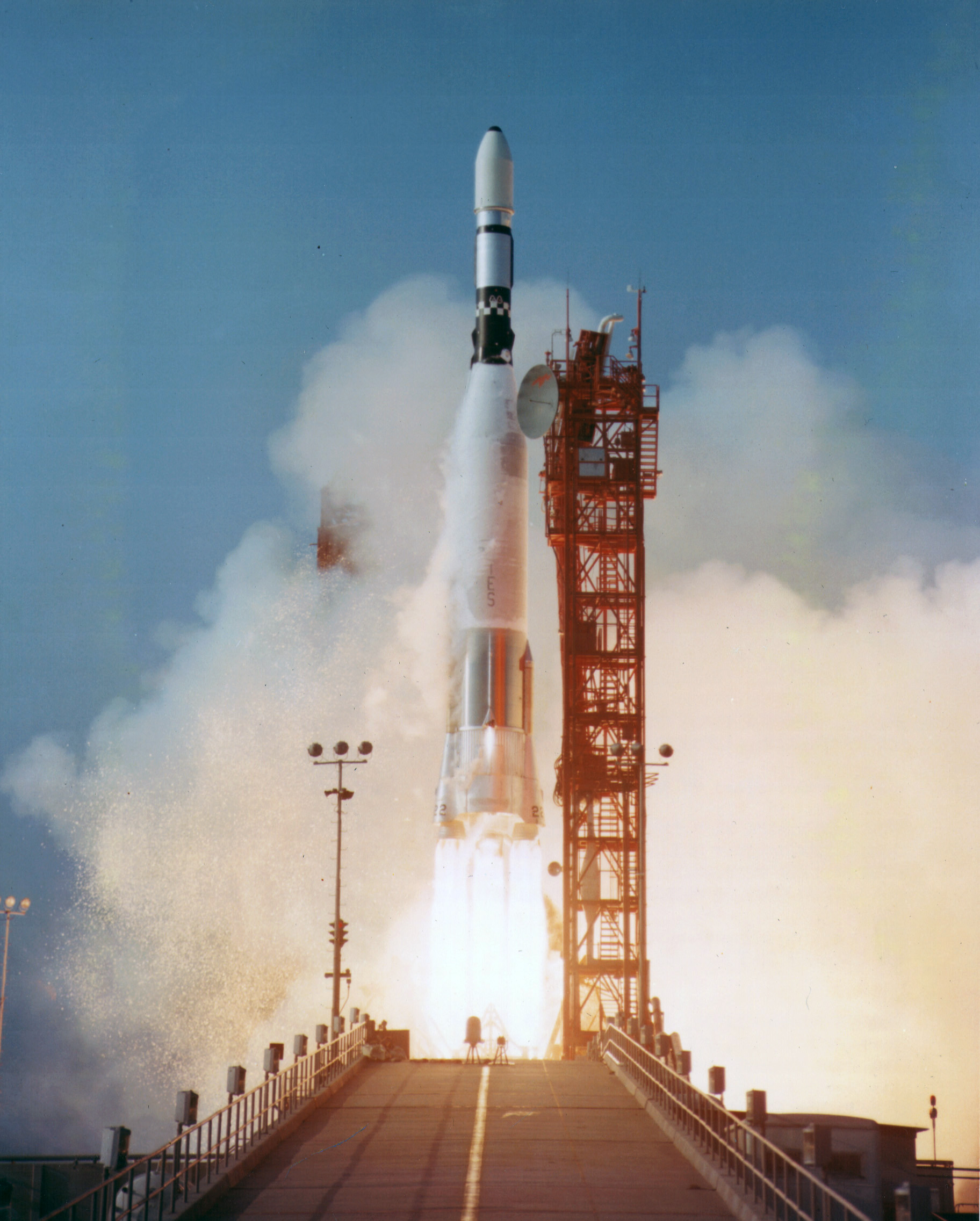
- An Atlas-Agena launching Lunar Orbiter 4
- Function: Expendable launch system
- Manufacturer: Convair/General Dynamics
- Country of origin: United States

Size
- Height: 118.0 feet (36.0 m)
- Diameter: 10.0 feet (3.0 m)
- Width: 16.0 feet (4.9 m)
- Mass: 341,000 pounds (155,000 kg)
- Stages: 2½

Capacity

Payload to LEO
- Mass: 2,200 pounds (1,000 kg)

Payload to GEO
- Mass: 1,540 pounds (700 kg)

Payload to TLI
- Mass: 850 pounds (390 kg)

Payload to escape
- Mass: 575 pounds (261 kg)

Launch history
- Status: Retired
- Launch sites: LC-12, 13 & 14, CCAFS; SLC-3 & 4, Vandenberg
- Total launches: 109
- Success(es): 93
- Failure: 13
- Partial failure: 3
- First flight: 26 February 1960
- Last flight: 27 June 1978

Boosters
- No. boosters: 1
- Width: 16.0 feet (4.9 m)
- Powered by: 2
- Maximum thrust: 233,000 pounds-force (1,040 kN)
- Burn time: 134 seconds
- Propellant: RP-1/LOX

First stage
- Diameter: 10.0 feet (3.0 m)
- Powered by: 1
- Maximum thrust: 67,000 pounds-force (300 kN)
- Burn time: 5 minutes
- Propellant: RP-1/LOX

Second stage – Agena D
- Height: 248 inches (6.3 m)
- Diameter: 5.0 feet (1.5 m)
- Powered by: 1 Bell Aerospace 8247
- Maximum thrust: 16,000 pounds-force (71 kN)
- Burn time: 265 seconds
- Propellant: UDMH/IRFNA

The Atlas-Agena was an American expendable launch system derived from the SM-65 Atlas missile. It was a member of the Atlas family of rockets, and was launched 109 times between 1960 and 1978. It was used to launch the first five Mariner uncrewed probes to the planets Venus and Mars, and the Ranger and Lunar Orbiter uncrewed probes to the Moon. The upper stage was also used as an uncrewed orbital target vehicle for the Gemini crewed spacecraft to practice rendezvous and docking. However, the launch vehicle family was originally developed for the Air Force and most of its launches were classified DoD payloads.

The Atlas-Agena was a two-and-a-half-stage rocket, with a stage-and-a-half Atlas missile as the first stage, and an RM-81 Agena second stage. Initially, Atlas D missiles, redesignated as the LV-3, were used as the first stage. These were later replaced by the standardized Atlas SLV-3, and its derivatives, the SLV-3A and B. The final Atlas-Agena launch used an Atlas E/F.

Launches were conducted from Launch Complexes 12, 13 and 14 at the Cape Canaveral Air Force Station, and Launch Complexes 1 and 2 at Point Arguello (now SLC-3 and 4 at Vandenberg Space Force Base).

== Variants ==
=== Atlas LV-3 Agena-A ===
The earliest Agena variant was the Agena A in 1959–60, which did not have restart capability, mostly flown on Thor-Agena boosters for the Discoverer program.

The early Atlas LV3 Agena A variant was flown four times for the Midas and Samos programs (Midas 1, Midas 2, Samos 1, and Samos 2), with two failures.

=== Atlas LV-3 Agena-B ===
Interactive 3D model of Atlas-Agena B

Late in 1960, Lockheed introduced the uprated Agena B stage which was restartable and had longer propellant tanks for more burn time. It first flew on the Thor and did not make its maiden voyage on an Atlas for months, when Midas 3 launched on July 12, 1961.

The Atlas LV-3 Agena B was used between 1961 and 1965 for a variety of NASA and DoD programs, including Ranger, Mariner, Samos, and Midas but proved an unreliable, with only 21 successes in 28 flights.

=== Atlas SLV-3 Agena-B ===
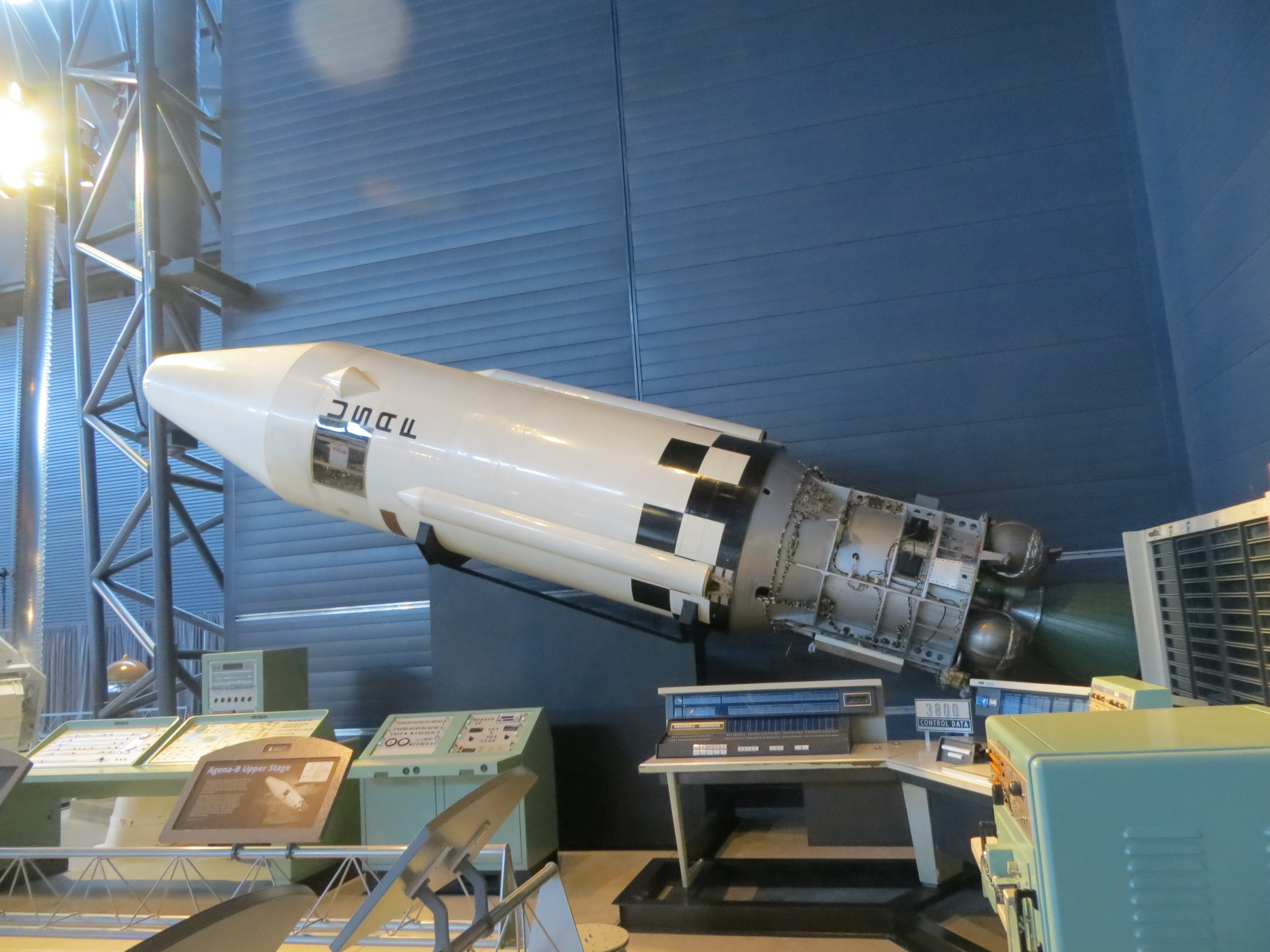
Atlas-Agena B upper stage on display at the Steven F. Udvar-Hazy Center

The Atlas SLV-3 Agena-B was a specific variant used to launch the OGO-3 satellite in 1966.

=== Atlas LV-3 / SLV-3 / SLV-3A / SLV-3B / E/F Agena-D ===
In late 1962, after Ranger 5 suffered a booster malfunction, albeit a minor one that ground controllers were able to work around, NASA convened a review board which undertook a wholesale reevaluation of the Atlas-Agena as a launch vehicle. The board found that quality control and checkout procedures were poor, and that this situation was exacerbated by the several dozen configurations of the booster, as each individual DoD and NASA program necessitated custom modifications to the Atlas and Agena, and the latter also differed in its Atlas and Thor variants. The board recommended improved quality control, better hardware, and also establishing one standardized launch vehicle for all space programs.

==== Atlas LV-3 Agena D ====
The result was the Atlas LV-3 Agena D, a standardized version of the Atlas D core and Agena B which would be the same on every launch (at least as far as the Atlas was concerned, Agena Ds often still had customized setups, especially for DoD payloads). The Agena D first flew in July 1963, starting a series of 15 successful launches for NASA and Air Force programs, including Ranger, Mariner, Midas, and Gambit.

==== Atlas SLV-3 Agena D ====
The Atlas SLV-3 Agena D first flew in August 1964. Forty-seven Atlas SLV-3 Agena D boosters were flown over the following years, mostly for the KH-7 Gambit and Vela programs, and also for a few NASA missions like Mariner.

==== Atlas SLV-3A Agena-D ====
The Atlas SLV-3A Agena-D was a variant with an extended tank, for twelve launches including OGO-5 and Canyon/Rhyolite SIGINT satellites, between 1968 and 1978.

==== Atlas SLV-3B Agena-D ====
The Atlas SLV-3B Agena-D was a specific variant used to launch the first OAO satellite in 1966.

==== Atlas E/F Agena D ====
The last Atlas-Agena was flown in 1978 to launch SEASAT, on a repurposed Atlas F missile designated Atlas E/F Agena D.

Atlas Agena Variants
Name	First launch	Last launch	Launches	Successes	Failures	Partial failures	Remarks
Atlas LV-3 Agena-A	1960-02-26	1961-01-31	4	2	2	0	Early Atlas-Agena variant flown four times for the Midas and Samos programs
Atlas LV-3 Agena-B	1961-07-12	1965-03-21	28	21	5	2	Enhanced, restartable Agena. Used for a variety of NASA and Air Force programs, including Ranger, Mariner, Samos, and Midas.
Atlas LV-3 Agena-D	1963-07-12	1965-07-20	15	15	0	0	Standardized Agena B used for a variety of NASA and Air Force programs, including Ranger, Mariner, Midas, and Gambit.
Atlas SLV-3 Agena-D	1964-08-14	1967-11-05	47	41	5	1	Standardized SLV-3 Atlas+Agena D used for a variety of NASA and Air Force programs, including Mariner, Vela, and Gambit.
Atlas SLV-3B Agena-D	1966-04-08		1	1	0	0	One-off Atlas variant used for the first OAO satellite.
Atlas SLV-3 Agena-B	1966-06-07		1	1	0	0	One-off Atlas variant used for OGO-3
Atlas SLV-3A Agena-D	1968-03-04	1978-04-08	12	11	1	0	Extended tank Atlas. Used for OGO-5 and Canyon/Rhyolite SIGINT satellites.
Atlas E/F Agena D	1978-06-27		1	1	0	0	One-off Atlas variant mating the last Agena stage flown to a refurbished Atlas F missile for the launch of Seasat.

== Destruct system ==
The Agena stage on Atlas vehicles had its own Flight Termination System in case a booster malfunction necessitated vehicle destruct, however due to weight limitations there was no separate command receiver. The FTS was wired to the command receiver on the Atlas and would be triggered by activation of the latter's FTS. This meant that the Agena could not be destroyed after staging. Atlas-Agena vehicles also had the ISDS (Inadvertent Separation Destruct System) to activate the Agena's FTS if it separated prematurely, a situation most likely to be caused by a booster hard-over. This consisted of a series of trip wires in the booster adapter section that would activate the Agena FTS if broken. The ISDS would be disabled at staging.

The Gemini-Agena Target Vehicle had a specially modified Range Safety destruct system designed to fire slugs into the propellant tanks rather than the conventional method of rupturing them externally, since an inadvertent activation in orbit could endanger the Gemini astronauts.

The very first Atlas-Agena flight, MIDAS 1 in February 1960, failed when the unproven ISDS mistakenly activated at staging, rupturing the Atlas's LOX tank and causing the breakup of the Agena. The ISDS was redesigned afterwards and this failure mode did not repeat itself. One Atlas-Agena vehicle (Mariner 1) was intentionally destroyed when the Atlas went off-course and three others (MIDAS 6, MIDAS 8, and Canyon 4) broke up in flight resulting in activation of the ISDS and destruct of the Agena.

== Production launches ==
=== Ranger ===
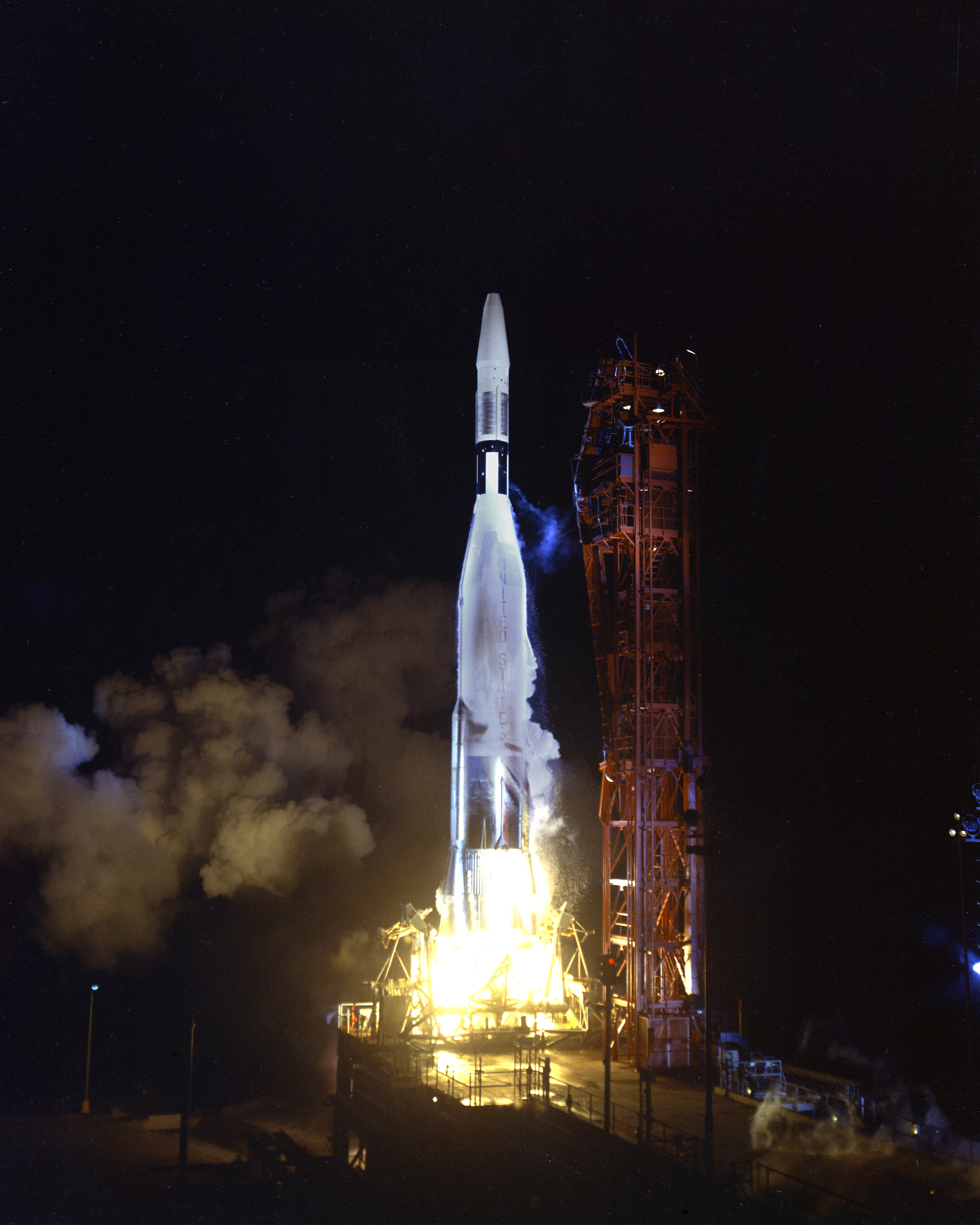
Launch of Ranger 1

The Ranger spacecraft were designed to impact the Moon, returning photographs of the lunar surface until their destruction. The spacecraft was designed in three Blocks, all similar in appearance with a forward antenna and magnetometer, supported by a boom, with more sensors and two solar panels and a dish antenna mounted at the base. The first two Block I spacecraft, Ranger 1 and Ranger 2, were launched on August 23 and November 18, 1961, not to the Moon, but in intended high Earth orbits to test the Atlas-Agena and spacecraft capabilities. However, the Agena malfunctioned on both flights and left the probes trapped in a useless low Earth orbit from which they soon decayed.

The Block II missions, Ranger 3, Ranger 4, and Ranger 5, were launched away from Earth in January, April, and October 1962, but all three failed due to either malfunctions of the probe or launch vehicle difficulties. Ranger 3 missed the Moon entirely. Ranger 4's solar panels failed to deploy, and the navigation system failed, sending the probe to impact the lunar far side without returning any pictures or data. Ranger 5 suffered an unknown failure which deprived it of power, and it missed the Moon by 725 kilometers (391 nautical miles).

Ranger 6, launched January 30, 1964, successfully impacted the Moon but its cameras failed to return pictures. The last three Rangers were finally successful: Ranger 7 in July 1964, Ranger 8 in February 1965, and Ranger 9 in March 1965.

=== Mariner ===
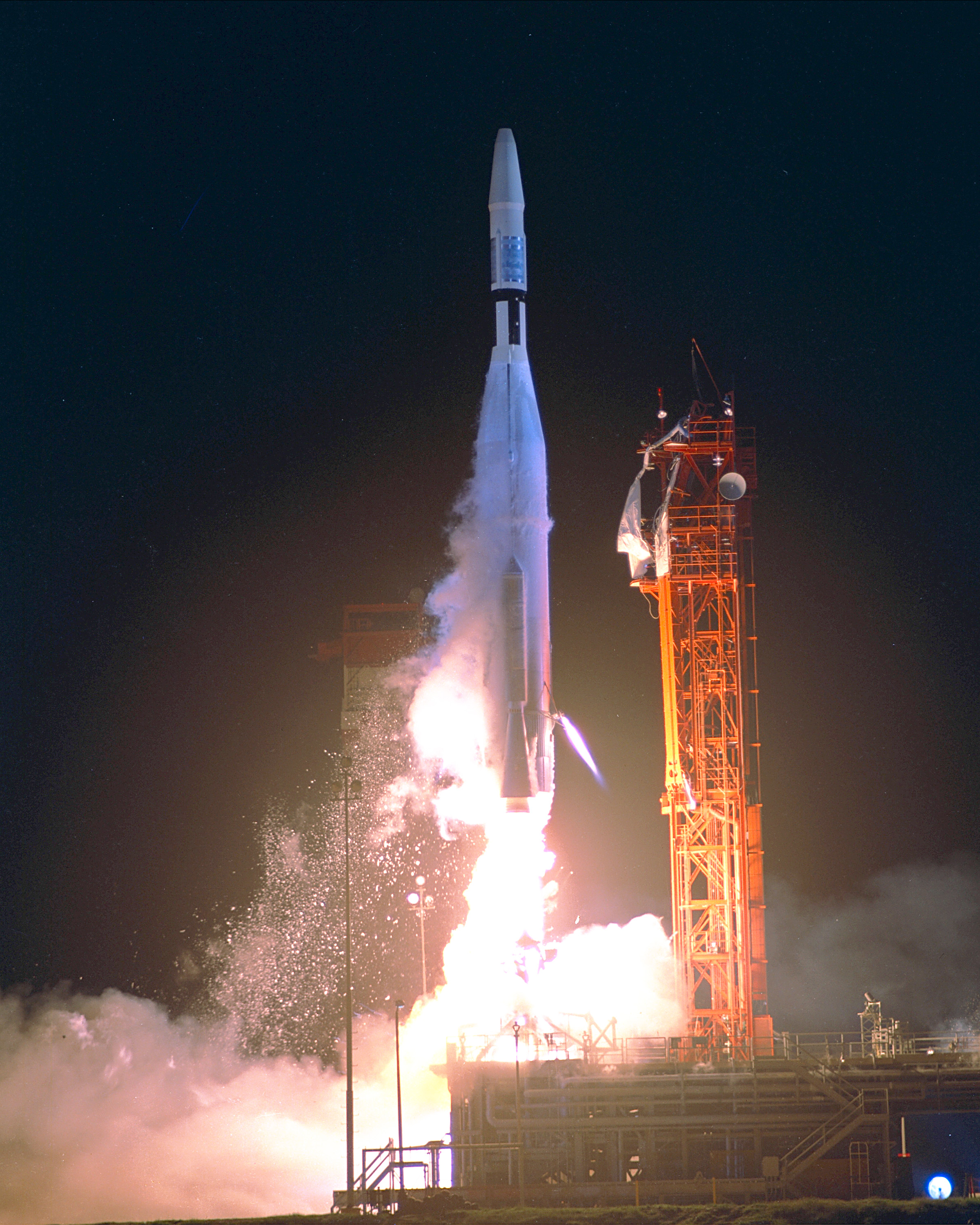
Atlas-Agena carrying the Mariner 1 spacecraft lifting off from Cape Kennedy Launch Complex 12.

The Mariner spacecraft were built by NASA's Jet Propulsion Laboratory. Mariner 1 and Mariner 2 were twins, launched on July 22 and August 27, 1962, to fly by the planet Venus. The first two craft used the same spacecraft bus as the Block I Rangers, each weighing 446 pounds (202 kg) and instrumented to perform radiometric temperature measurements of the planet, and to measure interplanetary magnetic fields and particles. Mariner 1's Atlas-Agena malfunctioned and went off course, requiring its destruction approximately 5 minutes after liftoff. Mariner 2 successfully made the 3½-month flight, becoming the first spacecraft to fly by another planet. It carried microwave and infrared radiometers, and sensors for cosmic dust, solar plasma and high-energy radiation, and magnetic fields.

Mariner 3 and Mariner 4 used a redesigned spacecraft bus weighing 575 pounds (261 kg), and were launched on November 5 and November 28, 1964, to fly by the planet Mars. Mariner 3 failed after a successful launch when its payload shroud failed to open. These Mariners carried cameras, and Mariner 4 successfully returned pictures of Mars as it flew by.

The 540-pound (240 kg) Mariner 5 was successfully launched to Venus on June 14, 1967, and flew by in October, probing Venus's atmosphere with radio waves, scanning its brightness in ultraviolet light, and sampling solar particles and magnetic field fluctuations above the planet.

=== Gemini ===
View at Pad 14 during prelaunch operations for the Atlas/Agena. The Agena is mounted atop its Atlas launch vehicle

The Agena rocket stage was used as the passive docking target for the Gemini crewed space program. After docking, the Agena could also be fired by the astronauts to raise the combined Gemini-Agena spacecraft into a higher orbit. The first attempt at such a docking mission was made for the Gemini 6 mission on October 25, 1965, but the Agena suffered an engine failure and did not reach orbit. This forced postponement and replanning of the Gemini 6A mission, which performed rendezvous with Gemini 7 without docking.

The GATV was first successfully launched for Gemini 8 on March 16, 1966, permitting the first successful docking in space. GATV-8 was later used as the secondary Agena target for Gemini 10, which also docked with its own GATV. GATV-9 failed to orbit when the Atlas suffered a control malfunction, forcing a similar reschedule of the Gemini 9A mission using a backup Augmented Target Docking Adapter atop an Atlas, but with no Agena rocket stage. Two more GATVs were successfully launched and used on Gemini 11 and Gemini 12.

=== Lunar Orbiter ===
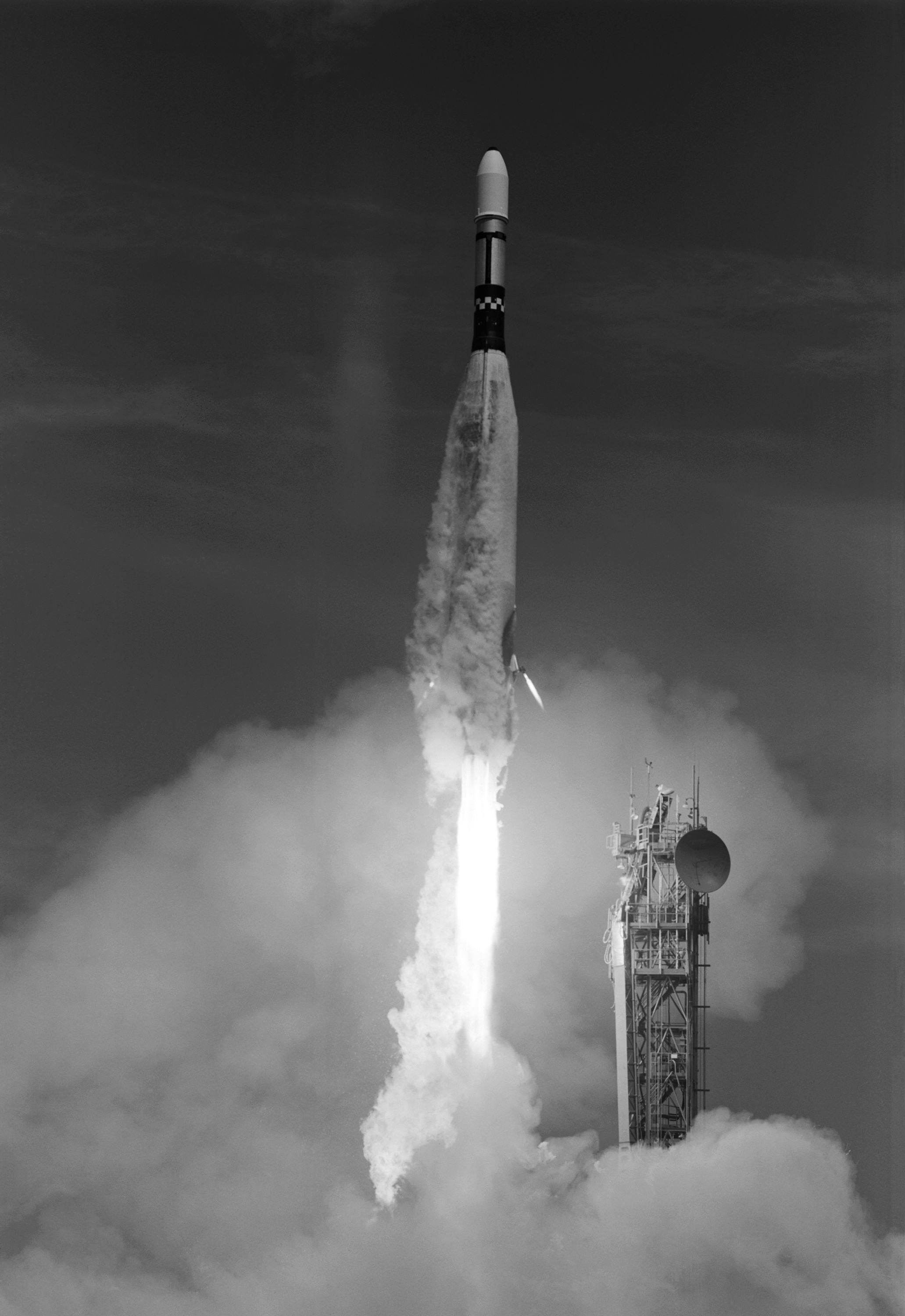
Liftoff of Lunar Orbiter I

A series of five Lunar Orbiter spacecraft were launched from August 1966 through August 1967, to help select landing sites for the Apollo lunar landing program by mapping the Moon's surface. Each spacecraft weighed 850 pounds (390 kg) and was 4.9 feet (1.5 m) in diameter, minus the four extended solar panels. All launches were successful, and a total of 99 percent of the surface of the Moon (near and far side) was mapped with resolution as high as 3 ft 3 in (1 meter). Altogether the Orbiters returned 2180 high resolution and 882 medium resolution frames. The spacecraft also carried micrometeoroid sensors, which showed the average micro-meteoroid flux near the Moon to be two orders of magnitude greater than in interplanetary space, but slightly less than the near-Earth environment.

=== OAO ===
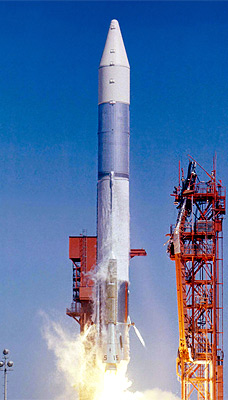
Atlas-SLV3B Agena-D launching OAO-1

Orbiting Astronomical Observatory was a series of NASA satellites flown between 1966 and 1972 for astronomy studies. The first OAO (launched April 8, 1966) used a one-off Atlas variant, mating an Agena D to the LV-3C variant of the Atlas and encased in a Centaur-type payload shroud. The remaining three launches used actual Atlas-Centaur vehicles.

=== ATS ===
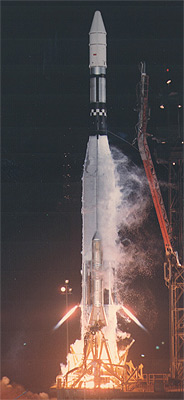
Atlas-SLV3 Agena-D with ATS-3

Applications Technology Satellite was a series of NASA satellites flown in 1967–69 to perform various technology tests. Only the first ATS was launched on an Atlas-Agena, the remainder using Atlas-Centaurs. ATS-1 was a partial failure when the Agena failed to restart, leaving it in LEO.

=== OGO ===
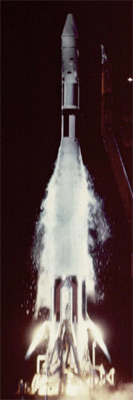
Atlas-LV3 Agena-B with OGO-1

Orbiting Geophysical Observatory was a series of NASA satellites flown between 1964 and 1969 for magnetosphere studies. These satellites used several different booster types, including Thor-Agenas. Five of them used Atlas-Agenas, and OGO 5 (launched March 4, 1968) was the sole civilian use of the Atlas SLV-3A Agena.

=== Midas ===
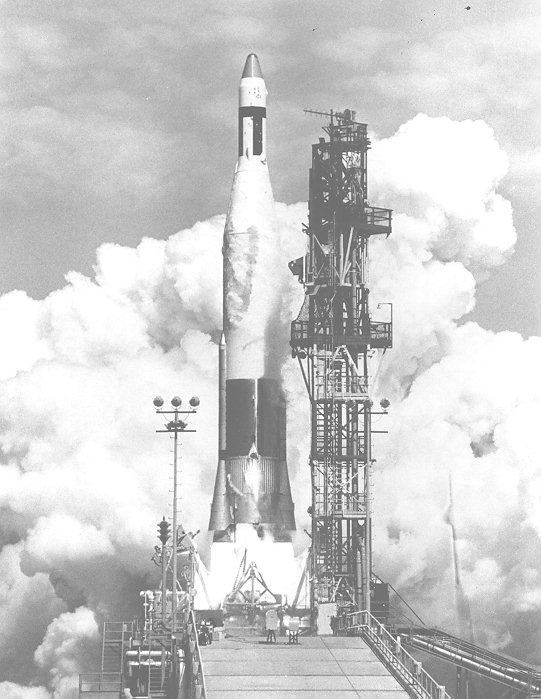
Atlas Agena A with Midas 1

Missile Defense Alarm System was a series of Air Force satellites flown between 1960 and 1966 for infrared detection of ballistic missile exhaust plumes on Atlas-Agena A, B, and D. There were several failures and overall program performance was poor, but it would give way to the more successful DSP satellites.

=== Samos ===
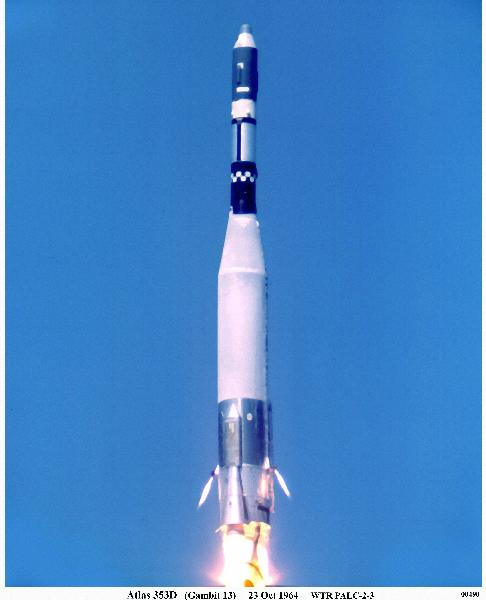
Atlas LV-3A Agenda D with KH-7 13 satellite.

Samos was a series of Air Force satellites flown between 1960 and 1962 for photoreconnaissance on Atlas-Agena A and B. There were several failures, including an on-pad explosion of an Atlas, and the program was cancelled at the end of 1962 without ever demonstrating any operational capability.

=== Gambit ===
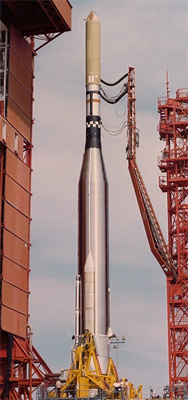
Atlas-SLV3A Agena-D with Rhyolite 3 / Aquacade 3

KH-7 Gambit was a series of Air Force satellites flown between 1963 and 1966 for photoreconnaissance on Atlas-Agena D. Although there were a number of mission failures, Gambit overall was highly successful in comparison with the bungled Samos program and it returned high-value area reconnaissance of the USSR and China before giving way to KH-8 Gambit in 1967.

=== Rhyolite/Canyon ===
Rhyolite/Canyon was a series of Air Force satellites flown between 1968 and 1978 for SIGNIT intelligence on Atlas SLV-3A Agena. One Canyon mission failed when its Atlas went off course and had to be destroyed. These were the final launches of Atlas-Agena vehicles aside from the one-off Atlas F/Agena used to launch Seasat.

=== Vela ===
Atlas Agena D rocket with Vela 2A, Vela 2B and ERS 13.

Vela consisted of two sets of Air Force satellites flown in 1964–65 to monitor Soviet compliance with the Nuclear Test Ban Treaty on Atlas-Agena Ds.

=== Snapshot ===
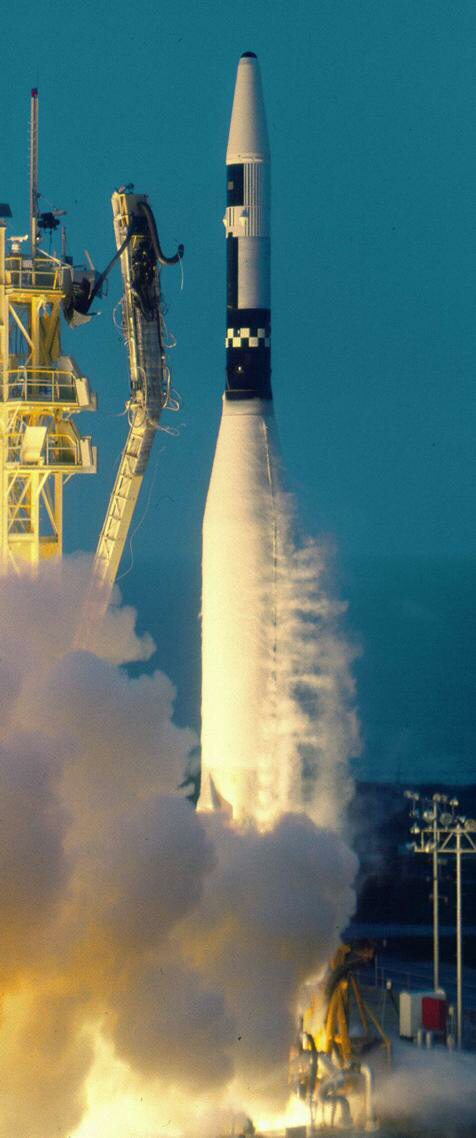
Launch of the SNAP-10A using an Atlas-Agena D SLV-3

Snapshot was a one-off Air Force test of a nuclear satellite flown in 1965 on an Atlas-Agena D.
