= 1964 in spaceflight (January–March) =

This is a list of spaceflights launched between January and March 1964. For launches in the rest of the year, see 1964 in spaceflight (April–June), 1964 in spaceflight (July–September) and 1964 in spaceflight (October–December). For an overview of the whole year, see 1964 in spaceflight.

== Orbital launches ==
- ← Jan
- Feb
- Mar
- Apr
- May
- Jun
- Jul
- Aug
- Sep
- Oct
- Nov
- Dec →

Date and time (UTC)	Rocket	Flight number	Launch site		LSP	
Date and time (UTC)	Payload (⚀ = CubeSat)	Operator	Orbit	Function	Decay (UTC)	Outcome
Date and time (UTC)	Remarks					
=== January ===
11 January; 20:07	(United States) Thrust Augmented Thor SLV-2A Agena-D		(United States) Vandenberg LC-75-3-5		(United States) US Air Force	
11 January; 20:07	(United States) Poppy 3A (Solrad 7A)	NRL	Low Earth	Radiation	In orbit	Successful
11 January; 20:07	(United States) Poppy 3B (NRL-PL 135)	US Navy/NRL	Low Earth	ELINT	In orbit	Successful
11 January; 20:07	(United States) Poppy 3C (GGSE-1)	NRL	Low Earth	Gravity gradient stabilization	In orbit	Successful
11 January; 20:07	(United States) SECOR-1 (EGRS-1)	US Army	Low Earth	Geodesy	In orbit	Successful
11 January; 20:07	NRL Composite 4					
19 January; 10:59:54	(United States) Thor SLV-2 Agena-D		(United States) Vandenberg LC-75-1-2		(United States) US Air Force	
19 January; 10:59:54	(United States) OPS 3367A (DSAP-1 F6/P-35 6)	US Air Force	Low Earth	Weather	In orbit	Successful
19 January; 10:59:54	(United States) OPS 3367B (DSAP-1 F7/P-35 7)	US Air Force	Low Earth	Weather	In orbit	Successful
21 January; 21:14:59	(United States) Delta B		(United States) Cape Canaveral LC-17B		(United States) US Air Force	
21 January; 21:14:59	(United States) Relay 2 (A-16)	NASA	Medium Earth	Communications	In orbit	Successful
25 January; 13:59:04	(United States) Thor SLV-2 Agena-B		(United States) Vandenberg LC-75-1-1		(United States) US Air Force	
25 January; 13:59:04	(United States) Echo 2	NASA/Unknown	Low Earth	Communications	7 June 1969	Successful
29 January; 16:25:01	(United States) Saturn I		(United States) Cape Canaveral LC-37B		(United States) NASA	
29 January; 16:25:01	(United States) Saturn I SA-5 (Jupiter nosecone)	NASA	Low Earth	Test flight	30 April	Successful
29 January; 16:25:01	First all-up test and orbital launch of the Saturn I.					
30 January; 21:51:02	(Soviet Union) Vostok-K		(Soviet Union) Baikonur Site 1/5		(Soviet Union)	
30 January; 21:51:02	(Soviet Union) Elektron 1		Medium Earth	Radiation	In orbit	Successful
30 January; 21:51:02	(Soviet Union) Elektron 2		Highly elliptical	Radiation	27 April 1997	Successful
30 January; 15:49:09	(United States) Atlas LV-3A Agena-B		(United States) Cape Canaveral LC-12		(United States) US Air Force	
30 January; 15:49:09	(United States) Ranger 6	NASA	Highly elliptical	Lunar impactor	2 February; 09:24:32	Spacecraft failure
30 January; 15:49:09	Impacted Mare Tranquillitatis, camera failed to return imagery.					
← Jan; Feb; Mar; Apr; May; Jun; Jul; Aug; Sep; Oct; Nov; Dec →; === February ===
15 February; 21:38	(United States) Thrust Augmented Thor SLV-2A Agena-D		(United States) Vandenberg LC-75-3-4		(United States) US Air Force	
15 February; 21:38	(United States) OPS 3444 (KH-4A 3/1004)	US Air Force/NRO	Low Earth	Optical imaging	9 March	Successful
15 February; 21:38	(United States) SRV 629	US Air Force/NRO	Low Earth	Film return	February	Successful
15 February; 21:38	(United States) SRV 628	US Air Force/NRO	Low Earth	Film return	February	Successful
19 February; 05:47:40	(Soviet Union) Molniya-M		(Soviet Union) Baikonur Site 1/5		(Soviet Union)	
19 February; 05:47:40	(Soviet Union) Venera 3MV-1 №2		Intended: Heliocentric	Venus flyby	In orbit	Launch failure
19 February; 05:47:40	Second stage malfunctioned.					
25 February; 13:26	(Soviet Union) Kosmos 63S1		(Soviet Union) Kapustin Yar Mayak-2		(Soviet Union)	
25 February; 13:26	(Soviet Union) Kosmos 25 (DS-P1 №4)		Low Earth	Radar target Technology	21 November	Successful
25 February; 18:59:47	(United States) Atlas LV-3A Agena-D		(United States) Point Arguello LC-2-3		(United States) US Air Force	
25 February; 18:59:47	(United States) OPS 2423 (KH-7 5/4005/AFP-206 SV-955)	US Air Force/NRO	Low Earth	Optical imaging	1 March	Successful
28 February; 03:20	(United States) Thrust Augmented Thor SLV-2A Agena-D		(United States) Vandenberg LC-75-3-5		(United States) US Air Force	
28 February; 03:20	(United States) OPS 3722 (Ferret 5/Samos-F3 1)	US Air Force/NRO	Low Earth	ELINT	19 February 1969	Successful
← Jan; Feb; Mar; Apr; May; Jun; Jul; Aug; Sep; Oct; Nov; Dec →; === March ===
11 March; 20:14:24	(United States) Atlas LV-3A Agena-D		(United States) Point Arguello LC-2-3		(United States) US Air Force	
11 March; 20:14:24	(United States) OPS 3435 (KH-7 6/4006/AFP-206 SV-956)	US Air Force/NRO	Low Earth	Optical imaging	16 March	Successful
18 March; 15:07	(Soviet Union) Kosmos 63S1		(Soviet Union) Kapustin Yar Mayak-2		(Soviet Union)	
18 March; 15:07	(Soviet Union) Kosmos 26 (DS-MG №1)		Low Earth	Technology	28 September	Successful
19 March; 11:13:41	(United States) Delta B		(United States) Cape Canaveral LC-17A		(United States) US Air Force	
19 March; 11:13:41	(United States) BE-A (S-66)	NASA	Intended: Low Earth	Ionospheric	19 March	Launch failure
19 March; 11:13:41	Final flight of Delta B, third stage produced insufficient thrust, failed to orbit.					
21 March; 08:15:35	(Soviet Union) Molniya-M		(Soviet Union) Baikonur Site 1/5		(Soviet Union)	
21 March; 08:15:35	(Soviet Union) Luna E-6 №6		Intended: Highly elliptical	Lunar flyby	21 March	Launch failure
21 March; 08:15:35	(Soviet Union) Luna E-6 №6 SA		Intended: Highly elliptical Achieved: Low Earth	Lunar lander	21 March	Launch failure
21 March; 08:15:35	Failed to orbit.					
24 March; 22:22:48	(United States) Thrust Augmented Thor SLV-2A Agena-D		(United States) Point Arguello LC-1-1		(United States) US Air Force	
24 March; 22:22:48	(United States) OPS 3467 (KH-4A 4/1003)	US Air Force/NRO	Intended: Low Earth	Optical imaging	24 March	Launch failure
24 March; 22:22:48	(United States) SRV 631	US Air Force/NRO	Intended: Low Earth	Film return	24 March	Launch failure
24 March; 22:22:48	(United States) SRV 630	US Air Force/NRO	Intended: Low Earth	Film return	24 March	Launch failure
24 March; 22:22:48	Failed to orbit.					
27 March; 03:24:42	(Soviet Union) Molniya-M		(Soviet Union) Baikonur Site 1/5		(Soviet Union)	
27 March; 03:24:42	(Soviet Union) Kosmos 27 (Venera 3MV-1 №3)		Intended: Heliocentric; Achieved: Low Earth	Venus flyby	29 March	Launch failure
27 March; 03:24:42	(Soviet Union) Kosmos 27 SA		Intended: Heliocentric; Achieved: Low Earth	Venus lander	29 March	Launch failure
27 March; 03:24:42	Upper stage attitude control system failure.					
27 March; 17:25:23	(United States) Scout X-3		(United States) Wallops Island LA-3		(United States) NASA	
27 March; 17:25:23	(United Kingdom) Ariel 2 (UK-C/UK-2/S-52)	SERC	Low Earth	Galactic radiation	18 November 1967	Successful
27 March; 17:25:23	Final flight of Scout X-3.					
← Jan; Feb; Mar; Apr; May; Jun; Jul; Aug; Sep; Oct; Nov; Dec →
For flights after 31 March, see 1964 in spaceflight (April-June)

== Suborbital launches ==
- ← Jan
- Feb
- Mar
- Apr
- May
- Jun
- Jul
- Aug
- Sep
- Oct
- Nov
- Dec →

Date and time (UTC)	Rocket	Flight number	Launch site		LSP	
Date and time (UTC)	Payload (⚀ = CubeSat)	Operator	Orbit	Function	Decay (UTC)	Outcome
Date and time (UTC)	Remarks					
=== January ===
4 January	(Soviet Union) R-9 Desna		(Soviet Union) Baikonur		(Soviet Union) RVSN	
4 January		RVSN	Suborbital	Missile test	4 January	Successful
4 January	Apogee: 1,160 kilometres (720 mi)					
6 January	(United States) Nike Zeus 3		(United States) Kwajalein		(United States) US Army	
6 January		US Army	Suborbital	ABM test	6 January	Successful
6 January	Apogee: 200 kilometres (120 mi)					
8 January; 00:00:10	(United States) UGM-27 Polaris A3		(United States) Cape Canaveral LC-29A		(United States) US Navy	
8 January; 00:00:10		US Navy	Suborbital	Missile test	8 January	Successful
8 January; 00:00:10	Apogee: 1,000 kilometres (620 mi)					
8 January; 13:15	(United States) Nike-Apache		(India) Thumba		(United States) NASA	
8 January; 13:15		NASA	Suborbital	Aeronomy	8 January	Successful
8 January; 13:15	Apogee: 187 kilometres (116 mi)					
9 January; 05:22	(Canada) Black Brant II		(Canada) Churchill		(Canada) NRC	
9 January; 05:22		NRC	Suborbital	Auroral; Ionospheric; Micrometeoroid research	9 January	Successful
9 January; 05:22	Apogee: 115 kilometres (71 mi)					
9 January	(Soviet Union) R-12 Dvina		(Soviet Union) Kapustin Yar		(Soviet Union) MVS	
9 January		MVS	Suborbital	Missile test	9 January	Successful
9 January	Apogee: 402 kilometres (250 mi)					
9 January	(Soviet Union) R-9 Desna		(Soviet Union) Baikonur		(Soviet Union) RVSN	
9 January		RVSN	Suborbital	Missile test	9 January	Successful
9 January	Apogee: 1,160 kilometres (720 mi)					
10 January	(United States) LGM-30B Minuteman IB		(United States) Vandenberg LF-07		(United States) Strategic Air Command	
10 January		Strategic Air Command	Suborbital	Missile test	10 January	Successful
10 January	Apogee: 1,300 kilometres (810 mi)					
12 January; 00:26	(United States) Nike-Apache		(India) Thumba		(United States) NASA	
12 January; 00:26		NASA	Suborbital	Aeronomy	12 January	Successful
12 January; 00:26	Apogee: 187 kilometres (116 mi)					
12 January	(Soviet Union) R-9 Desna		(Soviet Union) Baikonur		(Soviet Union) RVSN	
12 January		RVSN	Suborbital	Missile test	12 January	Successful
12 January	Apogee: 1,160 kilometres (720 mi)					
13 January; 16:30:04	(United States) UGM-27 Polaris A2		(United States) USS Nathan Hale, ETR		(United States) US Navy	
13 January; 16:30:04		US Navy	Suborbital	Missile test	13 January	Launch failure
13 January; 16:30:04	Apogee: 100 kilometres (62 mi)					
13 January; 21:50:01	(United States) UGM-27 Polaris A2		(United States) USS Nathan Hale, ETR		(United States) US Navy	
13 January; 21:50:01		US Navy	Suborbital	Missile test	13 January	Successful
13 January; 21:50:01	Apogee: 1,000 kilometres (620 mi)					
13 January; 23:39:00	(United States) UGM-27 Polaris A2		(United States) USS Nathan Hale, ETR		(United States) US Navy	
13 January; 23:39:00		US Navy	Suborbital	Missile test	13 January	Launch failure
13 January; 23:39:00	Apogee: 2 kilometres (1.2 mi)					
14 January; 06:05	(Canada) Black Brant II		(Canada) Churchill		(Canada) NRC	
14 January; 06:05		NRC	Suborbital	Auroral; Ionospheric; Micrometeoroid research	14 January	Successful
14 January; 06:05	Apogee: 155 kilometres (96 mi)					
14 January	(United States) Nike-Tomahawk 9A		(United States) Barking Sands		(United States) Sandia	
14 January		Sandia	Suborbital	Test flight	14 January	Successful
14 January	Apogee: 292 kilometres (181 mi)					
14 January	(Soviet Union) R-12 Dvina		(Soviet Union) Kapustin Yar		(Soviet Union) MVS	
14 January		MVS	Suborbital	Missile test	14 January	Successful
14 January	Apogee: 402 kilometres (250 mi)					
15 January; 20:30:19	(United States) LGM-25C Titan II		(United States) Cape Canaveral LC-15		(United States) US Air Force	
15 January; 20:30:19		AFCRL	Suborbital	Test flight	15 January	Successful
15 January; 20:30:19	Apogee: 1,300 kilometres (810 mi)					
15 January; 22:34	(United States) Nike-Apache		(United States) Wallops Island		(United States) NASA	
15 January; 22:34		GCA	Suborbital	Aeronomy	15 January	Launch failure
15 January; 22:34	Apogee: 45 kilometres (28 mi)					
15 January; 22:40	(United States) Nike-Apache		(United States) Wallops Island		(United States) NASA	
15 January; 22:40		GCA	Suborbital	Aeronomy	15 January	Successful
15 January; 22:40	Apogee: 114 kilometres (71 mi)					
16 January; 04:28:58	(Soviet Union) R-36		(Soviet Union) Baikonur Site 67/21		(Soviet Union) RVSN	
16 January; 04:28:58		RVSN	Suborbital	Missile test	16 January	Successful
16 January; 04:28:58	Apogee: 908 kilometres (564 mi)					
16 January; 05:00	(United States) Nike-Apache		(United States) Wallops Island		(United States) NASA	
16 January; 05:00		GCA	Suborbital	Aeronomy	16 January	Successful
16 January; 05:00	Apogee: 170 kilometres (110 mi)					
16 January; 11:34	(United States) Nike-Apache		(United States) Wallops Island		(United States) NASA	
16 January; 11:34		GCA	Suborbital	Aeronomy	16 January	Successful
16 January; 11:34	Apogee: 200 kilometres (120 mi)					
16 January	(United States) LGM-30B Minuteman IB		(United States) Vandenberg LF-02		(United States) Strategic Air Command	
16 January		Strategic Air Command	Suborbital	Missile test	16 January	Successful
16 January	Apogee: 1,300 kilometres (810 mi)					
17 January; 00:29:59	(United States) LGM-30B Minuteman IB		(United States) Cape Canaveral LC-32B		(United States) US Air Force	
17 January; 00:29:59		US Air Force	Suborbital	Missile test	17 January	Successful
17 January; 00:29:59	Apogee: 1,300 kilometres (810 mi)					
17 January; 05:01	(United States) Javelin		(United States) Wallops Island		(United States) NASA	
17 January; 05:01		NRL	Suborbital	Aeronomy	17 January	Successful
17 January; 05:01	Apogee: 925 kilometres (575 mi)					
20 January; 17:02:01	(United States) UGM-27 Polaris A3		(United States) USNS Observation Island, ETR		(United States) US Navy	
20 January; 17:02:01		US Navy	Suborbital	Missile test	20 January	Successful
20 January; 17:02:01	Apogee: 1,000 kilometres (620 mi)					
20 January; 18:00	(Canada) Black Brant II		(Canada) Churchill		(Canada) CARDE	
20 January; 18:00		CARDE	Suborbital	Test flight	20 January	Successful
20 January; 18:00	Apogee: 204 kilometres (127 mi)					
20 January; 21:15	(Canada) Black Brant II		(Canada) Churchill		(Canada) CARDE	
20 January; 21:15		CARDE	Suborbital	Test flight	20 January	Successful
20 January; 21:15	Apogee: 204 kilometres (127 mi)					
22 January	(Soviet Union) R-9 Desna		(Soviet Union) Baikonur		(Soviet Union) RVSN	
22 January		RVSN	Suborbital	Missile test	22 January	Launch failure
22 January	(Soviet Union) R-9 Desna		(Soviet Union) Baikonur		(Soviet Union) RVSN	
22 January		RVSN	Suborbital	Missile test	22 January	Successful
22 January	Apogee: 1,160 kilometres (720 mi)					
22 January	(Soviet Union) R-9 Desna		(Soviet Union) Baikonur		(Soviet Union) RVSN	
22 January		RVSN	Suborbital	Missile test	22 January	Successful
22 January	Apogee: 1,160 kilometres (720 mi)					
23 January; 18:25	(United States) Nike-Cajun		(United States) Kwajalein		(United States) US Navy	
23 January; 18:25		Michigan	Suborbital	Aeronomy	23 January	Successful
23 January; 18:25	Apogee: 172 kilometres (107 mi)					
23 January; 18:36	(United States) Nike-Cajun		(Canada) Churchill		(United States) NASA	
23 January; 18:36		NASA	Suborbital	Aeronomy	23 January	Launch failure
23 January; 18:36	Apogee: 21 kilometres (13 mi)					
23 January	(United States) Nike-Tomahawk		(United States) Barking Sands		(United States) Sandia	
23 January		NASA	Suborbital	Test flight	23 January	Launch failure
23 January	Apogee: 5 kilometres (3.1 mi)					
23 January	(Soviet Union) R-12 Dvina		(Soviet Union) Kapustin Yar		(Soviet Union) MVS	
23 January		MVS	Suborbital	Missile test	23 January	Successful
23 January	Apogee: 402 kilometres (250 mi)					
23 January	(United States) LGM-25C Titan II		(United States) Vandenberg LC-395C		(United States) US Air Force	
23 January		US Air Force	Suborbital	Missile test	23 January	Successful
23 January	Apogee: 1,300 kilometres (810 mi)					
24 January; 00:16	(United States) Nike-Cajun		(United States) Wallops Island		(United States) NASA	
24 January; 00:16		NASA	Suborbital	Aeronomy	24 January	Successful
24 January; 00:16	Apogee: 119 kilometres (74 mi)					
24 January; 01:30	(United States) LGM-30A Minuteman IA		(United States) Vandenberg LF-04		(United States) Strategic Air Command	
24 January; 01:30		Strategic Air Command	Suborbital	Missile test	24 January	Successful
24 January; 01:30	Apogee: 1,300 kilometres (810 mi)					
25 January; 05:30	(United States) Nike-Apache		(India) Thumba		(United States) NASA	
25 January; 05:30		New Hampshire	Suborbital	Magnetospheric	25 January	Successful
25 January; 05:30	Apogee: 164 kilometres (102 mi)					
25 January	(Soviet Union) R-36		(Soviet Union) Baikonur Site 67/21		(Soviet Union) RVSN	
25 January		RVSN	Suborbital	Missile test	25 January	Launch failure
25 January	(Soviet Union) R-9 Desna		(Soviet Union) Baikonur		(Soviet Union) RVSN	
25 January		RVSN	Suborbital	Missile test	25 January	Successful
25 January	Apogee: 1,160 kilometres (720 mi)					
26 January; 16:47:03	(United States) UGM-27 Polaris A2		(United States) USS Nathan Hale, ETR		(United States) US Navy	
26 January; 16:47:03		US Navy	Suborbital	Missile test	26 January	Launch failure
26 January; 16:47:03	Apogee: 5 kilometres (3.1 mi)					
26 January; 19:59:03	(United States) UGM-27 Polaris A2		(United States) USS Nathan Hale, ETR		(United States) US Navy	
26 January; 19:59:03		US Navy	Suborbital	Missile test	26 January	Successful
26 January; 19:59:03	Apogee: 1,000 kilometres (620 mi)					
27 January; 04:30	(United States) Nike-Apache		(India) Thumba		(United States) NASA	
27 January; 04:30		New Hampshire	Suborbital	Magnetospheric	27 January	Successful
27 January; 04:30	Apogee: 164 kilometres (102 mi)					
28 January; 19:00	(United States) Aerobee-150 (Hi)		(United States) White Sands LC-35		(United States) NASA	
28 January; 19:00		NASA	Suborbital	Test flight	28 January	Successful
28 January; 19:00	Apogee: 126 kilometres (78 mi)					
28 January; 23:01:38	(United States) LGM-30B Minuteman IB		(United States) Cape Canaveral LC-31B		(United States) US Air Force	
28 January; 23:01:38		US Air Force	Suborbital	Missile test	28 January	Successful
28 January; 23:01:38	Apogee: 1,300 kilometres (810 mi)					
28 January	(United States) Nike-Tomahawk 9A		(United States) Barking Sands		(United States) Sandia	
28 January		Sandia	Suborbital	Aeronomy	28 January	Successful
28 January	Apogee: 290 kilometres (180 mi)					
29 January; 03:09	(United States) Aerobee-300A		(United States) Wallops Island		(United States) NASA	
29 January; 03:09		NASA	Suborbital	Aeronomy	29 January	Successful
29 January; 03:09	Apogee: 309 kilometres (192 mi)					
29 January; 04:11	(United States) Nike-Cajun		(United States) Wallops Island		(United States) NASA	
29 January; 04:11		NASA	Suborbital	Aeronomy	29 January	Successful
29 January; 04:11	Apogee: 254 kilometres (158 mi)					
29 January; 04:18	(United States) Nike-Cajun		(United Kingdom) Ascension		(United States) NASA	
29 January; 04:18		NASA	Suborbital	Aeronomy	29 January	Successful
29 January; 04:18	Apogee: 124 kilometres (77 mi)					
29 January; 10:00	(United States) Nike-Apache		(India) Thumba		(United States) NASA	
29 January; 10:00		New Hampshire	Suborbital	Magnetospheric	29 January	Successful
29 January; 10:00	Apogee: 167 kilometres (104 mi)					
29 January; 22:17	(United States) Nike-Cajun		(Canada) Churchill		(United States) NASA	
29 January; 22:17		NASA	Suborbital	Aeronomy	29 January	Successful
29 January; 22:17	Apogee: 122 kilometres (76 mi)					
29 January	(United States) LGM-30B Minuteman IB		(United States) Vandenberg LF-03		(United States) Strategic Air Command	
29 January		Strategic Air Command	Suborbital	Missile test	29 January	Successful
29 January	Apogee: 1,300 kilometres (810 mi)					
31 January; 13:30	(United States) Nike-Apache		(India) Thumba		(United States) NASA	
31 January; 13:30		New Hampshire	Suborbital	Magnetospheric	31 January	Successful
31 January; 13:30	Apogee: 167 kilometres (104 mi)					
31 January	(Soviet Union) R-12 Dvina		(Soviet Union) Kapustin Yar		(Soviet Union) MVS	
31 January		MVS	Suborbital	Missile test	31 January	Successful
31 January	Apogee: 402 kilometres (250 mi)					
January	(United States) Nike-Apache		(United States) White Sands		(United States) US Army	
January		US Army	Suborbital	Target	January	Successful
January	Apogee: 100 kilometres (62 mi)					
January	(United States) Nike-Apache		(United States) White Sands		(United States) US Army	
January		US Army	Suborbital	Target	January	Successful
January	Apogee: 100 kilometres (62 mi)					
January	(United States) MGM-31 Pershing I		(United States) Fort Wingate		(United States) US Army	
January		US Army	Suborbital	Missile test	January	Successful
January	Apogee: 250 kilometres (160 mi)					
=== February ===
1 February	(Soviet Union) R-12 Dvina		(Soviet Union) Kapustin Yar		(Soviet Union) MVS	
1 February		MVS	Suborbital	Missile test	1 February	Successful
1 February	Apogee: 402 kilometres (250 mi)					
2 February	(Soviet Union) R-14 Chusovaya		(Soviet Union) Kapustin Yar		(Soviet Union) RVSN	
2 February		RVSN	Suborbital	Missile test	2 February	Successful
2 February	Apogee: 675 kilometres (419 mi)					
2 February	(Soviet Union) R-16U		(Soviet Union) Baikonur Site 60/8		(Soviet Union) RVSN	
2 February		RVSN	Suborbital	Missile test	2 February	Successful
2 February	Apogee: 1,210 kilometres (750 mi)					
2 February	(Soviet Union) R-9 Desna		(Soviet Union) Baikonur		(Soviet Union) RVSN	
2 February		RVSN	Suborbital	Missile test	2 February	Successful
2 February	Apogee: 1,160 kilometres (720 mi)					
3 February; 16:41:07	(United States) UGM-27 Polaris A2		(United States) USS James Monroe, ETR		(United States) US Navy	
3 February; 16:41:07		US Navy	Suborbital	Missile test	3 February	Successful
3 February; 16:41:07	Apogee: 1,000 kilometres (620 mi)					
4 February; 01:05	(United Kingdom) Skylark-5C		(Australia) Woomera LA-2		(United Kingdom) (Australia) RAE/WRE	
4 February; 01:05		RAE/WRE	Suborbital	Aeronomy	4 February	Successful
4 February; 01:05	Apogee: 118 kilometres (73 mi)					
4 February; 01:35:00	(United States) Nike-Apache		(United Kingdom) Ascension		(United States) NASA	
4 February; 01:35:00		Michigan	Suborbital	Aeronomy	4 February	Successful
4 February; 01:35:00	Apogee: 158 kilometres (98 mi)					
4 February; 01:46	(United States) Nike-Cajun		(United States) Wallops Island		(United States) NASA	
4 February; 01:46		NASA	Suborbital	Aeronomy	4 February	Successful
4 February; 01:46	Apogee: 116 kilometres (72 mi)					
4 February			(Soviet Union) Kapustin Yar		(Soviet Union) MVS	
4 February		MVS	Suborbital	Missile test	4 February	Successful
4 February	Apogee: 200 kilometres (120 mi)					
5 February; 00:39	(United States) Nike-Cajun		(Canada) Churchill		(United States) NASA	
5 February; 00:39		NASA	Suborbital	Aeronomy	5 February	Successful
5 February; 00:39	Apogee: 126 kilometres (78 mi)					
5 February; 03:20	(United States) Nike-Cajun		(United States) Wallops Island		(United States) NASA	
5 February; 03:20		NASA	Suborbital	Aeronomy	5 February	Successful
5 February; 03:20	Apogee: 119 kilometres (74 mi)					
5 February; 06:00	(Soviet Union) R-17 Elbrus		(Soviet Union) Kapustin Yar		(Soviet Union) MVS	
5 February; 06:00		MVS	Suborbital	Missile test	5 February	Launch failure
6 February	(United States) Honest John-Nike-Nike		(United States) Point Arguello LC-A		(United States) NASA	
6 February		NASA	Suborbital	Solar	6 February	Launch failure
6 February	Apogee: 5 kilometres (3.1 mi)					
6 February	(Soviet Union) R-16U		(Soviet Union) Baikonur Site 41/3		(Soviet Union) RVSN	
6 February		RVSN	Suborbital	Missile test	6 February	Successful
6 February	Apogee: 1,210 kilometres (750 mi)					
8 February	(Soviet Union) R-12 Dvina		(Soviet Union) Kapustin Yar		(Soviet Union) MVS	
8 February		MVS	Suborbital	Missile test	8 February	Successful
8 February	Apogee: 402 kilometres (250 mi)					
9 February; 04:12	(United States) Aerobee-150 (Hi)		(Canada) Churchill		(United States) US Air Force	
9 February; 04:12		Utah	Suborbital	Ionospheric; Auroral	9 February	Successful
9 February; 04:12	Apogee: 228 kilometres (142 mi)					
9 February	(France) Centaure 1		(Algeria) Hammaguira Bacchus		(France) CNES	
9 February		CNRS	Suborbital	Aeronomy	9 February	Successful
9 February	Apogee: 170 kilometres (110 mi)					
10 February	(United States) Athena RTV		(United States) Green River Pad 2		(United States) US Air Force	
10 February		US Air Force	Suborbital	REV Test	10 February	Launch failure
10 February	Apogee: 40 kilometres (25 mi)					
10 February	(France) Dragon		(Algeria) Hammaguira Bacchus		(France) CNES	
10 February		DMA	Suborbital	Test flight	10 February	Successful
10 February	Apogee: 470 kilometres (290 mi)					
11 February; 18:06	(Soviet Union) R-17 Elbrus		(Soviet Union) Kapustin Yar		(Soviet Union) MVS	
11 February; 18:06		MVS	Suborbital	Missile test	11 February	Launch failure
11 February	(United States) LGM-30A Minuteman IA		(United States) Vandenberg LF-06		(United States) Strategic Air Command	
11 February		Strategic Air Command	Suborbital	Missile test	11 February	Successful
11 February	Apogee: 1,300 kilometres (810 mi)					
12 February; 19:59:40	(United States) SM-65E Atlas		(United States) Vandenberg LC-576F		(United States) Strategic Air Command	
12 February; 19:59:40		Strategic Air Command	Suborbital	Missile test	12 February	Launch failure
12 February; 20:30	(United States) Nike-Apache		(United States) Wallops Island		(United States) NASA	
12 February; 20:30		NASA	Suborbital	Test flight	12 February	Successful
12 February; 20:30	Apogee: 145 kilometres (90 mi)					
12 February	(France) Centaure 1		(Algeria) Hammaguira Bacchus		(France) CNES	
12 February		CNRS	Suborbital	Aeronomy	12 February	Successful
12 February	Apogee: 150 kilometres (93 mi)					
12 February	(France) Centaure 1		(Algeria) Hammaguira Bacchus		(France) CNES	
12 February		CNRS	Suborbital	Aeronomy	12 February	Successful
12 February	Apogee: 150 kilometres (93 mi)					
12 February	(France) Centaure 1		(Algeria) Hammaguira Bacchus		(France) CNES	
12 February		CNRS	Suborbital	Aeronomy	12 February	Successful
12 February	Apogee: 150 kilometres (93 mi)					
13 February; 01:36:22	(United States) LGM-30B Minuteman IB		(United States) Cape Canaveral LC-32B		(United States) US Air Force	
13 February; 01:36:22		US Air Force	Suborbital	Missile test	13 February	Successful
13 February; 01:36:22	Apogee: 1,300 kilometres (810 mi)					
13 February; 04:29	(United States) Nike-Cajun		(Canada) Churchill		(United States) NASA	
13 February; 04:29		NASA	Suborbital	Aeronomy	13 February	Successful
13 February; 04:29	Apogee: 119 kilometres (74 mi)					
13 February; 04:30	(United States) Nike-Cajun		(United States) Wallops Island		(United States) NASA	
13 February; 04:30		NASA	Suborbital	Aeronomy	13 February	Successful
13 February; 04:30	Apogee: 119 kilometres (74 mi)					
13 February; 04:55	(United States) Nike-Cajun		(United Kingdom) Ascension		(United States) NASA	
13 February; 04:55		NASA	Suborbital	Aeronomy	13 February	Successful
13 February; 04:55	Apogee: 119 kilometres (74 mi)					
13 February; 05:00	(France) Centaure 1		(Algeria) Hammaguira Bacchus		(France) CNES	
13 February; 05:00		CNRS	Suborbital	Aeronomy	13 February	Successful
13 February; 05:00	Apogee: 150 kilometres (93 mi)					
13 February	(Soviet Union) R-12 Dvina		(Soviet Union) Kapustin Yar		(Soviet Union) MVS	
13 February		MVS	Suborbital	Missile test	13 February	Successful
13 February	Apogee: 402 kilometres (250 mi)					
13 February	(France) Centaure 1		(Algeria) Hammaguira Bacchus		(France) CNES	
13 February		CNRS	Suborbital	Aeronomy	13 February	Successful
13 February	Apogee: 190 kilometres (120 mi)					
14 February; 04:37	(France) Centaure 1		(Algeria) Hammaguira Bacchus		(France) CNES	
14 February; 04:37		CNES	Suborbital	Aeronomy	14 February	Successful
14 February; 04:37	Apogee: 190 kilometres (120 mi)					
14 February; 07:47	(United States) Thor DSV-2J		(United States) Johnston LE-1		(United States) US Air Force	
14 February; 07:47		Douglas	Suborbital	ABM test	14 February	Successful
14 February; 07:47	Apogee: 1,000 kilometres (620 mi)					
14 February			(Soviet Union) Kapustin Yar		(Soviet Union) MVS	
14 February		MVS	Suborbital	Missile test	14 February	Successful
14 February	Apogee: 200 kilometres (120 mi)					
15 February; 04:37	(France) Centaure 1		(Algeria) Hammaguira Bacchus		(France) CNES	
15 February; 04:37		CNES	Suborbital	Aeronomy	15 February	Successful
15 February; 04:37	Apogee: 150 kilometres (93 mi)					
17 February; 10:00	(United States) Aerobee-150 (Hi)		(United States) White Sands		(United States) NRL	
17 February; 10:00		NRL	Suborbital	Aeronomy	17 February	Successful
17 February; 10:00	Apogee: 268 kilometres (167 mi)					
17 February; 16:15	(United States) LGM-25C Titan II		(United States) Vandenberg LC-395B		(United States) US Air Force	
17 February; 16:15		US Air Force	Suborbital	Missile test	17 February	Successful
17 February; 16:15	Apogee: 1,300 kilometres (810 mi)					
17 February; 17:03:04	(United States) UGM-27 Polaris A2		(United States) USS James Monroe, ETR		(United States) US Navy	
17 February; 17:03:04		US Navy	Suborbital	Missile test	17 February	Successful
17 February; 17:03:04	Apogee: 1,000 kilometres (620 mi)					
18 February; 21:50	(United States) Nike-Apache		(United States) White Sands		(United States) US Air Force/ERDA	
18 February; 21:50		AFCRL	Suborbital	Aeronomy	18 February	Successful
18 February; 21:50	Apogee: 205 kilometres (127 mi)					
18 February	(Soviet Union) R-12 Dvina		(Soviet Union) Kapustin Yar		(Soviet Union) MVS	
18 February		MVS	Suborbital	Missile test	18 February	Successful
18 February	Apogee: 402 kilometres (250 mi)					
19 February; 15:15:07	(Soviet Union) R-36		(Soviet Union) Baikonur Site 67/21		(Soviet Union) RVSN	
19 February; 15:15:07		RVSN	Suborbital	Missile test	19 February	Successful
19 February; 15:15:07	Apogee: 906 kilometres (563 mi)					
19 February; 21:30	(United States) Nike-Cajun		(United States) White Sands		(United States) US Air Force/ERDA	
19 February; 21:30		AFCRL	Suborbital	Aeronomy	19 February	Successful
19 February; 21:30	Apogee: 154 kilometres (96 mi)					
20 February; 03:00	(United Kingdom) Skylark-7		(Australia) Woomera LA-2		(United Kingdom) (Australia) RAE/WRE	
20 February; 03:00		RAE/WRE	Suborbital	Test flight	20 February	Launch failure
20 February; 03:00	Apogee: 112 kilometres (70 mi)					
20 February; 07:23	(United States) Nike-Apache		(Canada) Churchill		(United States) NASA	
20 February; 07:23		NASA	Suborbital	Auroral	20 February	Successful
20 February; 07:23	Apogee: 204 kilometres (127 mi)					
20 February			(Soviet Union) Kapustin Yar		(Soviet Union) MVS	
20 February		MVS	Suborbital	Missile test	20 February	Successful
20 February	Apogee: 200 kilometres (120 mi)					
20 February			(Soviet Union) Kapustin Yar		(Soviet Union) MVS	
20 February		MVS	Suborbital	Missile test	20 February	Successful
20 February	Apogee: 200 kilometres (120 mi)					
20 February			(Soviet Union) Kapustin Yar		(Soviet Union) MVS	
20 February		MVS	Suborbital	Missile test	20 February	Successful
20 February	Apogee: 200 kilometres (120 mi)					
20 February			(Soviet Union) Kapustin Yar		(Soviet Union) MVS	
20 February		MVS	Suborbital	Missile test	20 February	Successful
20 February	Apogee: 200 kilometres (120 mi)					
24 February; 14:57	(United States) MGM-31 Pershing I		(United States) Fort Wingate		(United States) US Army	
24 February; 14:57		US Army	Suborbital	Missile test	24 February	Successful
24 February; 14:57	Apogee: 250 kilometres (160 mi)					
25 February; 00:17	(United States) MGM-31 Pershing I		(United States) Fort Wingate		(United States) US Army	
25 February; 00:17		US Army	Suborbital	Missile test	25 February	Successful
25 February; 00:17	Apogee: 250 kilometres (160 mi)					
25 February; 02:00	(United States) LGM-30B Minuteman IB		(United States) Vandenberg LF-02		(United States) Strategic Air Command	
25 February; 02:00		Strategic Air Command	Suborbital	Missile test	25 February	Successful
25 February; 02:00	Apogee: 1,300 kilometres (810 mi)					
25 February; 02:45	(United States) LGM-30B Minuteman IB		(United States) Vandenberg LF-03		(United States) Strategic Air Command	
25 February; 02:45		Strategic Air Command	Suborbital	Missile test	25 February	Successful
25 February; 02:45	Apogee: 1,300 kilometres (810 mi)					
25 February; 20:22	(United States) SM-65E Atlas		(United States) Cape Canaveral LC-11		(United States) US Air Force	
25 February; 20:22		US Air Force	Suborbital	REV Test	25 February	Successful
25 February; 20:22	Apogee: 1,600 kilometres (990 mi)					
25 February	(United States) MGM-31 Pershing I		(United States) Fort Wingate		(United States) US Army	
25 February		US Army	Suborbital	Missile test	25 February	Launch failure
25 February	Apogee: 10 kilometres (6.2 mi)					
26 February; 01:29:58	(United States) LGM-30B Minuteman IB		(United States) Cape Canaveral LC-31B		(United States) US Air Force	
26 February; 01:29:58		US Air Force	Suborbital	Missile test	26 February	Successful
26 February; 01:29:58	Apogee: 1,300 kilometres (810 mi)					
26 February; 20:14:44	(United States) LGM-25C Titan II		(United States) Cape Canaveral LC-15		(United States) US Air Force	
26 February; 20:14:44		US Air Force	Suborbital	Missile test	26 February	Successful
26 February; 20:14:44	Apogee: 1,300 kilometres (810 mi)					
26 February; 21:18	(United States) Aerobee-150 (Hi)		(Canada) Churchill		(United States) NASA	
26 February; 21:18		Johns Hopkins	Suborbital	Aeronomy	26 February	Launch failure
26 February; 21:18	Apogee: 161 kilometres (100 mi)					
26 February	(Soviet Union) R-16U		(Soviet Union) Baikonur		(Soviet Union) RVSN	
26 February		RVSN	Suborbital	Missile test	26 February	Launch failure
27 February; 02:30:28	(Soviet Union) R-36		(Soviet Union) Baikonur Site 67/21		(Soviet Union) RVSN	
27 February; 02:30:28		RVSN	Suborbital	Missile test	27 February	Launch failure
28 February; 02:04:14	(United States) LGM-30B Minuteman IB		(United States) Cape Canaveral LC-32B		(United States) US Air Force	
28 February; 02:04:14		US Air Force	Suborbital	Missile test	28 February	Successful
28 February; 02:04:14	Apogee: 1,300 kilometres (810 mi)					
28 February	(United States) MGM-31 Pershing I		(United States) Fort Wingate		(United States) US Army	
28 February		US Army	Suborbital	Missile test	28 February	Successful
28 February	Apogee: 250 kilometres (160 mi)					
29 February; 05:32	(United States) Nike-Apache		(Canada) Churchill		(United States) NASA	
29 February; 05:32		NASA	Suborbital	Auroral	29 February	Successful
29 February; 05:32	Apogee: 204 kilometres (127 mi)					
29 February	(United States) LGM-30A Minuteman IA		(United States) Vandenberg LF-04		(United States) Strategic Air Command	
29 February		Strategic Air Command	Suborbital	Missile test	29 February	Successful
29 February	Apogee: 1,300 kilometres (810 mi)					
29 February	(United States) LGM-30A Minuteman IA		(United States) Vandenberg LF-05		(United States) Strategic Air Command	
29 February		Strategic Air Command	Suborbital	Missile test	29 February	Successful
29 February	Apogee: 1,300 kilometres (810 mi)					
29 February	(Soviet Union) R-12 Dvina		(Soviet Union) Makat		(Soviet Union) MVS	
29 February		MVS	Suborbital	Missile test	29 February	Successful
29 February	Apogee: 402 kilometres (250 mi)					
=== March ===
1 March; 06:40	(United States) Thor DSV-2J		(United States) Johnston LE-1		(United States) US Air Force	
1 March; 06:40		US Air Force	Suborbital	ABM test	1 March	Successful
1 March; 06:40	Apogee: 674 kilometres (419 mi)					
2 March; 16:30:03	(United States) UGM-27 Polaris A2		(United States) USS Woodrow Wilson, ETR		(United States) US Navy	
2 March; 16:30:03		US Navy	Suborbital	Missile test	2 March	Successful
2 March; 16:30:03	Apogee: 1,000 kilometres (620 mi)					
3 March	(Soviet Union) R-16U		(Soviet Union) Baikonur		(Soviet Union) RVSN	
3 March		RVSN	Suborbital	Missile test	3 March	Successful
3 March	Apogee: 1,210 kilometres (750 mi)					
4 March; 09:53	(United States) HAD		(Australia) Woomera LA-2		(Australia) WRE	
4 March; 09:53		WRE	Suborbital	Aeronomy	4 March	Successful
4 March; 09:53	Apogee: 111 kilometres (69 mi)					
4 March	(Soviet Union) R-12 Dvina		(Soviet Union) Makat		(Soviet Union) MVS	
4 March		MVS	Suborbital	Missile test	4 March	Successful
4 March	Apogee: 402 kilometres (250 mi)					
4 March	(Soviet Union) R-16U		(Soviet Union) Baikonur Site 41/4		(Soviet Union) RVSN	
4 March		RVSN	Suborbital	Missile test	4 March	Successful
4 March	Apogee: 1,210 kilometres (750 mi)					
6 March	(United States) LGM-30B Minuteman IB		(United States) Vandenberg LF-07		(United States) Strategic Air Command	
6 March		Strategic Air Command	Suborbital	Missile test	6 March	Successful
6 March	Apogee: 1,300 kilometres (810 mi)					
7 March; 02:45	(United States) Nike-Cajun		(United States) Wallops Island		(United States) NASA	
7 March; 02:45		NASA	Suborbital	Aeronomy	7 March	Successful
7 March; 02:45	Apogee: 114 kilometres (71 mi)					
10 March; 02:06	(United Kingdom) Skylark-7C		(Australia) Woomera LA-2		(United Kingdom) (Australia) RAE/WRE	
10 March; 02:06		Southampton; ICST; UCL	Suborbital	GR astronomy Solar	10 March	Successful
10 March; 02:06	Apogee: 175 kilometres (109 mi)					
10 March	(Soviet Union) R-12 Dvina		(Soviet Union) Makat		(Soviet Union) MVS	
10 March		MVS	Suborbital	Missile test	10 March	Successful
10 March	Apogee: 402 kilometres (250 mi)					
10 March	(United States) Tomahawk		(United States) Tonopah		(United States) Sandia	
10 March		Sandia	Suborbital	Aeronomy	10 March	Successful
10 March	Apogee: 105 kilometres (65 mi)					
11 March; 12:30:05	(United States) UGM-27 Polaris A3		(United States) Cape Canaveral LC-25A		(United States) US Navy	
11 March; 12:30:05		US Navy	Suborbital	Missile test	11 March	Launch failure
11 March; 12:30:05	Apogee: 100 kilometres (62 mi)					
11 March; 18:00	(United States) Nike-Cajun		(United States) Eglin		(United States) US Air Force	
11 March; 18:00		AFCRL	Suborbital	Ionospheric	11 March	Successful
11 March; 18:00	Apogee: 100 kilometres (62 mi)					
11 March			(Algeria) Hammaguira Bacchus		(France) ONERA	
11 March		ONERA	Suborbital	Test flight	11 March	Successful
11 March	Apogee: 110 kilometres (68 mi)					
11 March	(United Kingdom) Black Knight 201		(Australia) Woomera LA-5		(United Kingdom) RAE	
11 March		RAE	Suborbital	REV Test	11 March	Successful
11 March	Apogee: 500 kilometres (310 mi)					
11 March	(Soviet Union) R-12 Dvina		(Soviet Union) Makat		(Soviet Union) MVS	
11 March		MVS	Suborbital	Missile test	11 March	Successful
11 March	Apogee: 402 kilometres (250 mi)					
12 March; 02:07	(United Kingdom) Skylark-7C		(Australia) Woomera LA-2		(United Kingdom) (Australia) RAE/WRE	
12 March; 02:07		Southampton; ICST; UCL	Suborbital	GR astronomy Solar	12 March	Successful
12 March; 02:07	Apogee: 176 kilometres (109 mi)					
12 March; 02:58:40	(United States) Nike-Apache		(Norway) Andøya		(Norway) NDRE	
12 March; 02:58:40		NASA	Suborbital	Auroral; Plasma; Solar	12 March	Successful
12 March; 02:58:40	Apogee: 146 kilometres (91 mi)					
12 March; 04:20	(United States) Nike-Cajun		(United States) Wallops Island		(United States) NASA	
12 March; 04:20		NASA	Suborbital	Test flight	12 March	Successful
12 March; 04:20	Apogee: 110 kilometres (68 mi)					
13 March; 11:40:56	(United States) XRM-91 Blue Scout Junior		(United States) Cape Canaveral LC-18A		(United States) US Air Force	
13 March; 11:40:56		AFCRL	Suborbital	Magnetospheric	13 March	Launch failure
13 March; 11:40:56	Apogee: 600 kilometres (370 mi)					
13 March; 17:04:47	(United States) LGM-30B Minuteman IB		(United States) Cape Canaveral LC-32B		(United States) US Air Force	
13 March; 17:04:47		US Air Force	Suborbital	Missile test	13 March	Successful
13 March; 17:04:47	Apogee: 1,300 kilometres (810 mi)					
13 March; 18:20	(United States) Nike-Cajun		(United States) Kwajalein		(United States) US Navy	
13 March; 18:20		Michigan	Suborbital	Aeronomy	13 March	Successful
13 March; 18:20	Apogee: 174 kilometres (108 mi)					
13 March	(Soviet Union) R-14 Chusovaya		(Soviet Union) Kapustin Yar		(Soviet Union) RVSN	
13 March		RVSN	Suborbital	Missile test	13 March	Launch failure
13 March	(United States) LGM-25C Titan II		(United States) Vandenberg LC-395C		(United States) US Air Force	
13 March		US Air Force	Suborbital	Missile test	13 March	Successful
13 March	Apogee: 1,300 kilometres (810 mi)					
14 March	(United States) Honest John-Nike-Nike		(United States) Point Arguello LC-A		(United States) NASA	
14 March		NASA	Suborbital	Solar	14 March	Successful
14 March	Apogee: 143 kilometres (89 mi)					
15 March; 02:44	(United States) Nike-Apache		(Norway) Andøya		(Norway) NDRE	
15 March; 02:44		NASA	Suborbital	Ionospheric; Plasma	15 March	Successful
15 March; 02:44	Apogee: 134 kilometres (83 mi)					
15 March; 14:12:54	(Soviet Union) R-17 Elbrus		(Soviet Union) Kapustin Yar		(Soviet Union) MVS	
15 March; 14:12:54		MVS	Suborbital	Missile test	15 March	Successful
15 March; 14:12:54	Apogee: 278 kilometres (173 mi)					
15 March			(Soviet Union) Kapustin Yar		(Soviet Union) MVS	
15 March		MVS	Suborbital	Missile test	15 March	Successful
15 March	Apogee: 200 kilometres (120 mi)					
16 March; 16:30:14	(United States) UGM-27 Polaris A2		(United States) USS Woodrow Wilson, ETR		(United States) US Navy	
16 March; 16:30:14		US Navy	Suborbital	Missile test	16 March	Successful
16 March; 16:30:14	Apogee: 1,000 kilometres (620 mi)					
16 March; 19:29	(United States) Aerobee-150 (Hi)		(United States) White Sands		(United States) NOTS	
16 March; 19:29		US Navy	Suborbital	Radiation	16 March	Successful
16 March; 19:29	Apogee: 200 kilometres (120 mi)					
16 March			(Soviet Union) Kapustin Yar		(Soviet Union) MVS	
16 March		MVS	Suborbital	Missile test	16 March	Successful
16 March	Apogee: 200 kilometres (120 mi)					
16 March	(United States) UGM-27 Polaris A2		(United States) USS Henry Clay, ETR		(United States) US Navy	
16 March		US Navy	Suborbital	Missile test	16 March	Successful
16 March	Apogee: 1,000 kilometres (620 mi)					
18 March; 06:11	(United States) Nike-Apache		(Canada) Churchill		(United States) NASA	
18 March; 06:11		Rice	Suborbital	Auroral	18 March	Successful
18 March; 06:11	Apogee: 151 kilometres (94 mi)					
18 March	(United States) Nike-Tomahawk		(United States) Barking Sands		(United States) Sandia	
18 March		Sandia	Suborbital	Aeronomy	18 March	Successful
18 March	Apogee: 315 kilometres (196 mi)					
19 March; 15:42	(United States) Nike-Apache		(Norway) Andøya		(Norway) NDRE	
19 March; 15:42		NDRE/BERG	Suborbital	Ionospheric; Plasma; Solar	19 March	Successful
19 March; 15:42	Apogee: 139 kilometres (86 mi)					
20 March; 05:23	(United States) Nike-Apache		(Canada) Churchill		(United States) NASA	
20 March; 05:23		Rice	Suborbital	Auroral	20 March	Successful
20 March; 05:23	Apogee: 151 kilometres (94 mi)					
20 March; 17:20:11	(United States) LGM-30B Minuteman IB		(United States) Cape Canaveral LC-31B		(United States) US Air Force	
20 March; 17:20:11		US Air Force	Suborbital	Missile test	20 March	Successful
20 March; 17:20:11	Apogee: 1,300 kilometres (810 mi)					
20 March	(United States) UGM-27 Polaris A2		(United States) USS Henry Clay, ETR		(United States) US Navy	
20 March		US Navy	Suborbital	Missile test	20 March	Successful
20 March	Apogee: 1,000 kilometres (620 mi)					
23 March; 10:37	(United States) Nike-Apache		(Canada) Churchill		(United States) NASA	
23 March; 10:37		Rice	Suborbital	Auroral	23 March	Successful
23 March; 10:37	Apogee: 153 kilometres (95 mi)					
23 March; 20:41:57	(United States) LGM-25C Titan II		(United States) Cape Canaveral LC-15		(United States) US Air Force	
23 March; 20:41:57		AFCRL	Suborbital	Test flight	23 March	Successful
23 March; 20:41:57	Apogee: 1,300 kilometres (810 mi)					
23 March	(United States) Nike-Tomahawk		(United States) Barking Sands		(United States) Sandia	
23 March		NASA	Suborbital	Aeronomy	23 March	Launch failure
23 March	Apogee: 20 kilometres (12 mi)					
23 March	(Soviet Union) R-12 Dvina		(Soviet Union) Kapustin Yar		(Soviet Union) MVS	
23 March		MVS	Suborbital	Missile test	23 March	Successful
23 March	Apogee: 402 kilometres (250 mi)					
24 March; 04:22:54	(United States) Nike-Apache		(Canada) Churchill		(United States) NASA	
24 March; 04:22:54		NASA	Suborbital	Auroral	24 March	Successful
24 March; 04:22:54	Apogee: 184 kilometres (114 mi)					
24 March	(United States) LGM-30B Minuteman IB		(United States) Vandenberg LF-02		(United States) Strategic Air Command	
24 March		Strategic Air Command	Suborbital	Missile test	24 March	Successful
24 March	Apogee: 1,300 kilometres (810 mi)					
24 March	(Soviet Union) R-12 Dvina		(Soviet Union) Kapustin Yar		(Soviet Union) MVS	
24 March		MVS	Suborbital	Missile test	24 March	Successful
24 March	Apogee: 402 kilometres (250 mi)					
25 March; 03:25	(United States) Nike-Apache		(Canada) Churchill		(United States) NASA	
25 March; 03:25		NASA	Suborbital	Auroral	25 March	Successful
25 March; 03:25	Apogee: 179 kilometres (111 mi)					
25 March	(United States) LGM-30B Minuteman IB		(United States) Vandenberg LF-03		(United States) Strategic Air Command	
25 March		Strategic Air Command	Suborbital	Missile test	25 March	Launch failure
25 March	Apogee: 1 kilometre (0.62 mi)					
25 March	(United States) Nike-Apache		(Italy) (Kenya) Santa Rita		(Italy) CRA	
25 March		CRA	Suborbital	Test flight	25 March	Successful
25 March	Apogee: 200 kilometres (120 mi)					
25 March	(United States) MGM-31 Pershing I		(United States) Fort Wingate		(United States) US Army	
25 March		US Army	Suborbital	Missile test	25 March	Successful
25 March	Apogee: 250 kilometres (160 mi)					
26 March; 03:30	(United States) Nike-Apache		(Canada) Churchill		(United States) NASA	
26 March; 03:30		NASA	Suborbital	Auroral	26 March	Successful
26 March; 03:30	Apogee: 193 kilometres (120 mi)					
26 March	(United States) LGM-30A Minuteman IA		(United States) Vandenberg LF-05		(United States) Strategic Air Command	
26 March		Strategic Air Command	Suborbital	Missile test	26 March	Successful
26 March	Apogee: 1,300 kilometres (810 mi)					
26 March	(Soviet Union) R-14 Chusovaya		(Soviet Union) Kapustin Yar		(Soviet Union) RVSN	
26 March		RVSN	Suborbital	Missile test	26 March	Successful
26 March	Apogee: 675 kilometres (419 mi)					
27 March	(Soviet Union) R-12 Dvina		(Soviet Union) Kapustin Yar		(Soviet Union) MVS	
27 March		MVS	Suborbital	Missile test	27 March	Launch failure
28 March	(United States) MGM-31 Pershing I		(United States) Fort Wingate		(United States) US Army	
28 March		US Army	Suborbital	Missile test	28 March	Successful
28 March	Apogee: 250 kilometres (160 mi)					
30 March; 19:00	(United States) Aerobee-150 (Hi)		(United States) White Sands LC-35		(United States) US Air Force	
30 March; 19:00		US Air Force	Suborbital	Solar	30 March	Successful
30 March; 19:00	Apogee: 248 kilometres (154 mi)					
30 March	(United States) Nike-Apache		(Italy) (Kenya) Santa Rita		(Italy) CRA	
30 March		CRA	Suborbital	Test flight	30 March	Successful
30 March	Apogee: 200 kilometres (120 mi)					
31 March; 02:33:11	(United States) LGM-30B Minuteman IB		(United States) Cape Canaveral LC-32B		(United States) US Air Force	
31 March; 02:33:11		US Air Force	Suborbital	Missile test	31 March	Successful
31 March; 02:33:11	Apogee: 1,300 kilometres (810 mi)					
31 March; 02:33:30	(United States) Nike Javelin		(United States) Cape Canaveral		(United States) Air Force Air Proving Ground Command (AGPC)	
31 March; 02:33:30		AGPC	Suborbital	Test flight	31 March	Successful
31 March; 02:33:30	Apogee: 131 kilometres (81 mi)					
31 March	(United States) LGM-30A Minuteman IA		(United States) Vandenberg LF-04		(United States) Strategic Air Command	
31 March		Strategic Air Command	Suborbital	Missile test	31 March	Successful
31 March	Apogee: 1,300 kilometres (810 mi)					
March	(United States) Nike-Apache		(United States) White Sands		(United States) US Army	
March		US Army	Suborbital	Target	March	Successful
March	Apogee: 100 kilometres (62 mi)					

- ← Jan
- Feb
- Mar
- Apr
- May
- Jun
- Jul
- Aug
- Sep
- Oct
- Nov
- Dec →
