= 1964 in spaceflight (October–December) =

This is a list of spaceflights launched between October and December 1964. For launches in the rest of the year, see 1964 in spaceflight (January–March), 1964 in spaceflight (April–June) and 1964 in spaceflight (July–September). For an overview of the whole year, see 1964 in spaceflight.

== Orbital launches ==
- ← Jan
- Feb
- Mar
- Apr
- May
- Jun
- Jul
- Aug
- Sep
- Oct
- Nov
- Dec →

Date and time (UTC)	Rocket	Flight number	Launch site		LSP	
Date and time (UTC)	Payload (⚀ = CubeSat)	Operator	Orbit	Function	Decay (UTC)	Outcome
Date and time (UTC)	Remarks					
=== October ===
4 October; 03:45:00	(United States) Delta C	D026	(United States) Cape Canaveral LC-17A		(United States) US Air Force	
4 October; 03:45:00	(United States) Explorer 21 (IMP-2/IMP-B/S-74a)	NASA	Highly elliptical	Magnetospheric	January 1966	Partial launch failure
4 October; 03:45:00	Apogee lower than expected, returned data until 13 October 1965.					
5 October; 21:50:14	(United States) Thrust Augmented Thor SLV-2A Agena-D		(United States) Vandenberg LC-75-3-4		(United States) US Air Force	
5 October; 21:50:14	(United States) OPS 3333 (KH-4A 11/1011)	US Air Force/NRO	Low Earth	Optical imaging	26 October	Successful
5 October; 21:50:14	(United States) SRV 653	US Air Force/NRO	Low Earth	Film return	October	Successful
5 October; 21:50:14	(United States) SRV 654	US Air Force/NRO	Low Earth	Film return	October	Partial spacecraft failure
5 October; 21:50:14	Aerial recovery of second SRV failed, necessitating recovery by ship.					
6 October; 07:12:00	(Soviet Union) Voskhod		(Soviet Union) Baikonur Site 1/5		(Soviet Union) RVSN	
6 October; 07:12:00	(Soviet Union) Kosmos 47 (Voskhod 3KV №1)		Low Earth	Test flight	7 October; 07:28	Successful
6 October; 17:04:21	(United States) Thor DSV-2A Ablestar		(United States) Vandenberg LC-75-1-2		(United States) US Air Force	
6 October; 17:04:21	(United States) OPS 5798 (Transit O-1/NNS 30010)	US Navy	Low Earth	Navigation	In orbit	Spacecraft failure
6 October; 17:04:21	(United States) Dragsphere 1	US Navy	Low Earth		In orbit	Successful
6 October; 17:04:21	(United States) Dragsphere 2	US Navy	Low Earth		In orbit	Successful
6 October; 17:04:21	Transit satellite failed a few days after becoming operational.					
8 October	(United States) Atlas SLV-3 Agena-D		(United States) Vandenberg PALC-2-4		(United States) US Air Force	
8 October	(United States) OPS 4036 (KH-7 12/4012/AFP-206 SV-961)	US Air Force/NRO	Intended: Low Earth	Optical imaging	8 October	Launch failure
8 October	Failed to orbit.					
10 October; 03:01	(United States) Scout X-4		(United States) Vandenberg PALC-D		(United States) US Air Force	
10 October; 03:01	(United States) Explorer 22 (BE-B/S-66a)	NASA	Low Earth	Geodesy; Ionospheric	In orbit	Successful
12 October; 07:30:01	(Soviet Union) Voskhod		(Soviet Union) Baikonur Site 1/5		(Soviet Union)	
12 October; 07:30:01	(Soviet Union) Voskhod 1		Low Earth	Biological	13 October; 07:47:04	Successful
12 October; 07:30:01	Manned flight with three cosmonauts, first manned Voskhod flight, first spacecraft to carry more than one person.					
14 October; 09:50	(Soviet Union) Vostok-2		(Soviet Union) Baikonur Site 31/6		(Soviet Union)	
14 October; 09:50	(Soviet Union) Kosmos 48 (Zenit-2 №24)		Low Earth	Optical imaging	20 October	Partial spacecraft failure
14 October; 09:50	Spacecraft's thermal regulation system malfunctioned, necessitating early return to Earth.					
17 October; 22:02:23	(United States) Thrust Augmented Thor SLV-2A Agena-D		(United States) Vandenberg PALC-1-1		(United States) US Air Force	
17 October; 22:02:23	(United States) OPS 3559 (KH-4A 12/1012)	US Air Force/NRO	Low Earth	Optical imaging	4 November	Partial spacecraft failure
17 October; 22:02:23	(United States) SRV 651	US Air Force/NRO	Low Earth	Film return	October	Successful
17 October; 22:02:23	(United States) SRV 645	US Air Force/NRO	Low Earth	Film return	October	Successful
17 October; 22:02:23	Attitude control problems during second imagery period.					
23 October; 07:30	(Soviet Union) Kosmos-1		(Soviet Union) Baikonur Site 41/15		(Soviet Union)	
23 October; 07:30	(Soviet Union) Strela-1 №6		Low Earth	Communications; Technology	23 October	Launch failure
23 October; 07:30	(Soviet Union) Strela-1 №7		Low Earth	Communications; Technology	23 October	Launch failure
23 October; 07:30	(Soviet Union) Strela-1 №8		Low Earth	Communications; Technology	23 October	Launch failure
23 October; 07:30	Failed to orbit.					
23 October; 18:30	(United States) Atlas LV-3A Agena-D		(United States) Vandenberg PALC-2-3		(United States) US Air Force	
23 October; 18:30	(United States) OPS 4384 (KH-7 13/4013/AFP-206 SV-963)	US Air Force/NRO	Low Earth	Optical imaging	28 October	Successful
23 October; 18:30	(United States) OPS 5063 (SSF-A 4/EHH A4)	US Air Force/NRO	Low Earth	SIGINT	23 February 1965	Successful
24 October; 05:16	(Soviet Union) Kosmos 63S1		(Soviet Union) Kapustin Yar Mayak-2		(Soviet Union) RVSN	
24 October; 05:16	(Soviet Union) Kosmos 49 (DS-MG №2)		Low Earth	Technology	21 August 1965	Successful
28 October; 10:48	(Soviet Union) Vostok-2		(Soviet Union) Baikonur Site 31/6		(Soviet Union)	
28 October; 10:48	(Soviet Union) Kosmos 50 (Zenit-2 №24)		Low Earth	Optical imaging	5 November	Spacecraft failure
28 October; 10:48	Failed to deorbit, commanded to self-destruct.					
← Jan; Feb; Mar; Apr; May; Jun; Jul; Aug; Sep; Oct; Nov; Dec →; === November ===
2 November; 21:30:20	(United States) Thrust Augmented Thor SLV-2A Agena-D		(United States) Vandenberg LC-75-3-4		(United States) US Air Force	
2 November; 21:30:20	(United States) OPS 5434 (KH-4A 13/1013)	US Air Force/NRO	Low Earth	Optical imaging	28 November	Partial spacecraft failure
2 November; 21:30:20	(United States) SRV 656	US Air Force/NRO	Low Earth	Film return	November	Successful
2 November; 21:30:20	(United States) SRV 657	US Air Force/NRO	Low Earth	Film return	November	Successful
2 November; 21:30:20	Both cameras erroneously took images immediately after launch, and subsequently failed before first imagery period was complete, 65% of images returned were out of focus.					
4 November; 02:12:11	(United States) Thrust Augmented Thor SLV-2A Agena-D		(United States) Vandenberg LC-75-3-5		(United States) US Air Force	
4 November; 02:12:11	(United States) OPS 3062 (Ferret 7/Samos-F3 3)	US Air Force/NRO	Low Earth	ELINT	5 November 1969	Successful
5 November; 19:22:05	(United States) Atlas LV-3A Agena-D		(United States) Cape Canaveral LC-13		(United States) US Air Force	
5 November; 19:22:05	(United States) Mariner 3	NASA	Heliocentric	Mars flyby	5 November	Launch failure
5 November; 19:22:05	Payload fairing failed to separate, resulting in spacecraft mass being too great to reach Mars.					
6 November; 12:02:01	(United States) Scout X-4		(United States) Wallops Island LA-3		(United States) NASA	
6 November; 12:02:01	(United States) Explorer 23 (S-55C)	NASA	Low Earth	Technology; Micrometeoroid research	29 June 1983	Successful
18 November; 20:35:54	(United States) Thrust Augmented Thor SLV-2A Agena-D		(United States) Vandenberg LC-75-1-1		(United States) US Air Force	
18 November; 20:35:54	(United States) OPS 3360 (KH-4A 14/1014)	US Air Force/NRO	Low Earth	Optical imaging	6 December	Successful
18 November; 20:35:54	(United States) SRV 659	US Air Force/NRO	Low Earth	Film return	November	Successful
18 November; 20:35:54	(United States) SRV 660	US Air Force/NRO	Low Earth	Film return	November	Successful
18 November; 20:35:54	Carried ORBIS experiment.					
21 November; 17:09:39	(United States) Scout X-4		(United States) Vandenberg PALC-D		(United States) US Air Force	
21 November; 17:09:39	(United States) Explorer 24 (AD-B/S-56c)	NASA	Medium Earth	Geodesy; Ionospheric	18 October 1968	Successful
21 November; 17:09:39	(United States) Explorer 25 (IE-B/Injun-4)	NASA	Medium Earth	Atmospheric; Ionospheric; Particle research	In orbit	Successful
28 November; 14:22:01	(United States) Atlas LV-3A Agena-D		(United States) Cape Canaveral LC-12		(United States) US Air Force	
28 November; 14:22:01	(United States) Mariner 4	NASA	Heliocentric	Mars flyby	In orbit	Successful
28 November; 14:22:01	First spacecraft to successfully fly past Mars, closest approach 9,846 kilometres (6,118 mi) at 01:00:57 UTC on 15 July 1965.					
30 November; 13:12	(Soviet Union) Molniya	G15000-29	(Soviet Union) Baikonur Site 1/5		(Soviet Union)	
30 November; 13:12	(Soviet Union) Zond 2 (Mars 3MV-4 №1)		Heliocentric	Mars flyby	In orbit	Spacecraft failure
30 November; 13:12	Communications lost in April 1965, flew past Mars on 6 August 1965.					
← Jan; Feb; Mar; Apr; May; Jun; Jul; Aug; Sep; Oct; Nov; Dec →; === December ===
1 December	(Soviet Union) Kosmos 63S1		(Soviet Union) Kapustin Yar Site 86/1		(Soviet Union) RVSN	
1 December	(Soviet Union) DS-2 №2		Low Earth	Technology	1 December	Launch failure
1 December	Payload fairing failed to separate, failed to orbit.					
4 December; 18:57	(United States) Atlas SLV-3 Agena-D		(United States) Vandenberg PALC-2-4		(United States) US Air Force	
4 December; 18:57	(United States) OPS 4439 (KH-7 14/4014/AFP-206 SV-964)	US Air Force/NRO	Low Earth	Optical imaging	6 December	Successful
9 December; 23:02	(Soviet Union) Kosmos 63S1		(Soviet Union) Kapustin Yar Site 86/1		(Soviet Union) RVSN	
9 December; 23:02	(Soviet Union) Kosmos 51 (DS-MT №3)		Low Earth	Technology	14 November 1965	Successful
10 December; 16:52:33	(United States) Titan IIIA		(United States) Cape Canaveral LC-20		(United States) US Air Force	
10 December; 16:52:33	(United States) Transtage 2	US Air Force	Low Earth	Test flight	13 December	Successful
11 December; 14:25:02	(United States) Atlas LV-3C Centaur-C	AC-4	(United States) Cape Canaveral LC-36A		(United States) NASA	
11 December; 14:25:02	(United States) Surveyor Mass Model 1	NASA	Intended: Medium Earth; Achieved: Low Earth	Test flight	12 December	Partial launch failure
11 December; 14:25:02	Centaur failed to restart.					
13 December; 00:08:10	(United States) Thor DSV-2A Ablestar		(United States) Vandenberg LC-75-1-2		(United States) US Air Force	
13 December; 00:08:10	(United States) OPS 6582 (Transit O-2/NNS 30020)	US Navy	Low Earth	Navigation	In orbit	Spacecraft failure
13 December; 00:08:10	(United States) Transit 5E-5	US Navy	Low Earth	Radiation	In orbit	Successful
13 December; 00:08:10	Transit O-2 failed a few days after becoming operational.					
15 December; 20:20:04	(United States) Scout X-4		(United States) Wallops Island LA-3A		(Italy) CRA	
15 December; 20:20:04	(Italy) San Marco 1	CRA	Low Earth	Technology; Air density	11 September 1965	Successful
15 December; 20:20:04	First Italian satellite.					
19 December; 21:10:16	(United States) Thrust Augmented Thor SLV-2A Agena-D		(United States) Vandenberg LC-75-3-4		(United States) US Air Force	
19 December; 21:10:16	(United States) OPS 3358 (KH-4A 15/1015)	US Air Force/NRO	Low Earth	Optical imaging	14 January 1965	Partial spacecraft failure
19 December; 21:10:16	(United States) SRV 662	US Air Force/NRO	Low Earth	Film return	December	Successful
19 December; 21:10:16	(United States) SRV 663	US Air Force/NRO	Low Earth	Film return	December/January	Successful
19 December; 21:10:16	Telemetry problems early in the mission led to some errors in areas photographed.					
21 December; 09:00:03	(United States) Delta C		(United States) Cape Canaveral LC-17A		(United States) US Air Force	
21 December; 09:00:03	(United States) Explorer 26 (EPE-D)	NASA	Highly elliptical	Magnetospheric	23 August 2021	Successful
21 December; 19:08:56	(United States) Thrust Augmented Thor SLV-2A Agena-D		(United States) Vandenberg LC-75-1-1		(United States) US Air Force	
21 December; 19:08:56	(United States) OPS 3762 (Quill 1/FTV 2355)	US Air Force/NRO	Low Earth	Radar imaging	11 January 1965	Successful
21 December; 19:08:56	(United States) SRV	US Air Force/NRO	Low Earth	Film return	Unknown	Successful
21 December; 19:08:56	Only Quill satellite to be launched, operated successfully but images found to be useless.					
← Jan; Feb; Mar; Apr; May; Jun; Jul; Aug; Sep; Oct; Nov; Dec →

== Suborbital launches ==
- ← Jan
- Feb
- Mar
- Apr
- May
- Jun
- Jul
- Aug
- Sep
- Oct
- Nov
- Dec →

Date and time (UTC)	Rocket	Flight number	Launch site		LSP	
Date and time (UTC)	Payload (⚀ = CubeSat)	Operator	Orbit	Function	Decay (UTC)	Outcome
Date and time (UTC)	Remarks					
=== October ===
2 October; 02:35	(United States) Aerobee-150 (Hi)		(United States) White Sands LC-35		(United States) NASA	
2 October; 02:35		NASA	Suborbital	XR astronomy	2 October	Successful
2 October; 02:35	Apogee: 144 kilometres (89 mi)					
2 October; 03:35:14	(Soviet Union) UR-200		(Soviet Union) Baikonur Site 90/20		(Soviet Union) RVSN	
2 October; 03:35:14		RVSN	Suborbital	Missile test	2 October	Successful
2 October; 03:35:14	Apogee: 681 kilometres (423 mi)					
2 October	(United States) LGM-25C Titan II		(United States) Vandenberg LC-395C		(United States) Strategic Air Command	
2 October		Strategic Air Command	Suborbital	Missile test	2 October	Successful
2 October	Apogee: 1,300 kilometres (810 mi)					
4 October; 06:00	(United States) Athena RTV		(United States) Green River Pad 2		(United States) US Air Force	
4 October; 06:00		US Air Force	Suborbital	REV Test	4 October	Launch failure
5 October	(France) Centaure 1		(Algeria) Hammaguira Bacchus		(France) CNES	
5 October		CNET	Suborbital	Test flight	5 October	Successful
5 October	Apogee: 150 kilometres (93 mi)					
6 October; 20:20	(Canada) Black Brant IIB		(Canada) Fort Churchill		(Canada) CARDE	
6 October; 20:20		CARDE	Suborbital	Test flight	6 October	Successful
6 October; 20:20	Apogee: 211 kilometres (131 mi)					
6 October	(Soviet Union) R-12 Dvina		(Soviet Union) Kapustin Yar		(Soviet Union) MVS	
6 October		MVS	Suborbital	Missile test	6 October	Successful
6 October	Apogee: 402 kilometres (250 mi)					
7 October; 18:35	(Canada) Black Brant IIB		(Canada) Fort Churchill		(Canada) CARDE	
7 October; 18:35		CARDE	Suborbital	Test flight	7 October	Successful
7 October; 18:35	Apogee: 213 kilometres (132 mi)					
7 October; 23:04	(United States) Nike-Apache		(United States) Wallops Island		(United States) NASA	
7 October; 23:04		GCA	Suborbital	Aeronomy	7 October	Successful
7 October; 23:04	Apogee: 172 kilometres (107 mi)					
7 October; 23:19	(United States) Nike-Apache		(United States) Wallops Island		(United States) NASA	
7 October; 23:19		NASA	Suborbital	Magnetospheric	7 October	Launch failure
7 October; 23:19	Apogee: 14 kilometres (8.7 mi)					
7 October	(France) Centaure 1		(Algeria) Hammaguira Bacchus		(France) CNES	
7 October		CNET	Suborbital	Test flight	7 October	Successful
7 October	Apogee: 150 kilometres (93 mi)					
8 October; 05:32	(United States) Javelin		(United States) Wallops Island		(United States) NASA	
8 October; 05:32		Lockheed	Suborbital	Aeronomy; Ionospheric	8 October	Successful
8 October; 05:32	Apogee: 1,004 kilometres (624 mi)					
8 October; 10:23	(United States) Nike-Apache		(United States) Wallops Island		(United States) NASA	
8 October; 10:23		GCA	Suborbital	Aeronomy	8 October	Successful
8 October; 10:23	Apogee: 160 kilometres (99 mi)					
8 October; 10:34:00	(United States) Nike-Apache		(United States) Wallops Island		(United States) NASA	
8 October; 10:34:00		NASA	Suborbital	Magnetospheric	8 October	Successful
8 October; 10:34:00	Apogee: 141 kilometres (88 mi)					
9 October; 04:04:56	(United States) Scout X-3C		(United States) Wallops Island LA-3A		(United States) NASA	
9 October; 04:04:56		NASA	Suborbital	REV Test	9 October	Successful
9 October; 04:04:56	Apogee: 132 kilometres (82 mi)					
9 October	(Soviet Union) R-12 Dvina		(Soviet Union) Kapustin Yar		(Soviet Union) MVS	
9 October		MVS	Suborbital	Missile test	9 October	Successful
9 October	Apogee: 402 kilometres (250 mi)					
10 October; 02:00	(Soviet Union) R-36		(Soviet Union) Baikonur Site 67/22		(Soviet Union) RVSN	
10 October; 02:00		RVSN	Suborbital	Missile test	10 October	Successful
10 October; 02:00	Apogee: 865 kilometres (537 mi)					
10 October; 07:00:04	(Soviet Union) R-17 Elbrus		(Soviet Union) Kapustin Yar		(Soviet Union) MVS	
10 October; 07:00:04		MVS	Suborbital	Missile test	10 October	Successful
10 October; 07:00:04	Apogee: 254 kilometres (158 mi)					
11 October	(Soviet Union) R-16U		(Soviet Union) Baikonur Site 41/4		(Soviet Union) RVSN	
11 October		RVSN	Suborbital	Missile test	11 October	Successful
11 October	Apogee: 1,210 kilometres (750 mi)					
11 October	(Soviet Union) R-16U		(Soviet Union) Baikonur Site 41/4		(Soviet Union) RVSN	
11 October		RVSN	Suborbital	Missile test	11 October	Successful
11 October	Apogee: 1,210 kilometres (750 mi)					
12 October	(France) Rubis		(Algeria) Hammaguira Bacchus		(France) ONERA	
12 October		ONERA	Suborbital	Test flight	12 October	Launch failure
12 October	Apogee: 60 kilometres (37 mi)					
13 October; 16:50:04	(United States) UGM-27 Polaris A3		(United States) USS James Madison, ETR		(United States) US Navy	
13 October; 16:50:04		US Navy	Suborbital	Missile test	13 October	Successful
13 October; 16:50:04	Apogee: 1,000 kilometres (620 mi)					
14 October; 09:36	(United States) HAD		(Australia) Woomera LA-2		(Australia) WRE	
14 October; 09:36		WRE	Suborbital	Aeronomy	14 October	Successful
14 October; 09:36	Apogee: 102 kilometres (63 mi)					
14 October	(United States) Aerobee-150A		(United States) Wallops Island		(United States) NOTS	
14 October		NOTS	Suborbital	Radiation	14 October	Successful
14 October	Apogee: 200 kilometres (120 mi)					
16 October; 12:10	(Soviet Union) R-17 Elbrus		(Soviet Union) Kapustin Yar		(Soviet Union) MVS	
16 October; 12:10		MVS	Suborbital	Missile test	16 October	Successful
16 October; 12:10	Apogee: 254 kilometres (158 mi)					
16 October	(United States) Terrier-Tomahawk		(United States) Barking Sands		(United States) Sandia	
16 October		Sandia	Suborbital	Aeronomy	16 October	Launch failure
16 October	(Soviet Union) R-12 Dvina		(Soviet Union) Kapustin Yar		(Soviet Union) MVS	
16 October		MVS	Suborbital	Missile test	16 October	Successful
16 October	Apogee: 402 kilometres (250 mi)					
17 October; 10:43	(United States) Nike-Apache		(United States) Eglin		(United States) US Air Force	
17 October; 10:43		AFCRL	Suborbital	Aeronomy	17 October	Successful
17 October; 10:43	Apogee: 156 kilometres (97 mi)					
17 October; 10:45	(United States) Nike Javelin		(United States) Eglin			
17 October; 10:45		AFCRL	Suborbital	Aeronomy	17 October	Successful
17 October; 10:45	Apogee: 177 kilometres (110 mi)					
19 October; 15:42	(United States) Javelin		(United States) Wallops Island		(United States) NASA	
19 October; 15:42		NASA	Suborbital	Ionospheric	19 October	Successful
19 October; 15:42	Apogee: 840 kilometres (520 mi)					
19 October; 23:00	(United Kingdom) Blue Streak		(Australia) Woomera LA-6A		(Europe) ELDO	
19 October; 23:00		ELDO	Suborbital		19 October	Successful
19 October; 23:00	Apogee: 243 kilometres (151 mi)					
19 October	(United States) UGM-27 Polaris A2		(United States) USS Alexander Hamilton, ETR		(United States) US Navy	
19 October		US Navy	Suborbital	Missile test	19 October	Successful
19 October	Apogee: 1,000 kilometres (620 mi)					
19 October	(United States) UGM-27 Polaris A2		(United States) USS Alexander Hamilton, ETR		(United States) US Navy	
19 October		US Navy	Suborbital	Missile test	19 October	Successful
19 October	Apogee: 1,000 kilometres (620 mi)					
19 October	(United States) UGM-27 Polaris A2		(United States) USS Alexander Hamilton, ETR		(United States) US Navy	
19 October		US Navy	Suborbital	Missile test	19 October	Successful
19 October	Apogee: 1,000 kilometres (620 mi)					
19 October	(United States) UGM-27 Polaris A2		(United States) USS Alexander Hamilton, ETR		(United States) US Navy	
19 October		US Navy	Suborbital	Missile test	19 October	Successful
19 October	Apogee: 1,000 kilometres (620 mi)					
20 October; 02:29	(Soviet Union) UR-200		(Soviet Union) Baikonur Site 90/20		(Soviet Union) RVSN	
20 October; 02:29		RVSN	Suborbital	Missile test	20 October	Successful
20 October; 02:29	Apogee: 1,129 kilometres (702 mi)					
20 October	(France) Emeraude VE121		(Algeria) Hammaguira Brigitte		(France) CNES	
20 October		CNES	Suborbital	Missile test	20 October	Launch failure
20 October	(United States) Tomahawk		(United States) Tonopah		(United States) Sandia	
20 October		Sandia	Suborbital	Aeronomy	20 October	Launch failure
21 October; 19:44	(United States) Astrobee-1500		(United States) Wallops Island LA-2A		(United States) NASA	
21 October; 19:44		NASA	Suborbital	Test flight	21 October	Successful
21 October; 19:44	Apogee: 1,950 kilometres (1,210 mi)					
21 October; 21:12	(United States) HAD		(Australia) Carnarvon		(Australia) WRE	
21 October; 21:12		WRE	Suborbital	Aeronomy	21 October	Successful
21 October; 21:12	Apogee: 100 kilometres (62 mi)					
22 October; 11:03	(United States) HAD		(Australia) Carnarvon		(Australia) WRE	
22 October; 11:03		WRE	Suborbital	Aeronomy	22 October	Successful
22 October; 11:03	Apogee: 100 kilometres (62 mi)					
23 October; 16:00	(United States) Javelin		(United States) Wallops Island		(United States) NASA	
23 October; 16:00		NASA	Suborbital	Radio astronomy	23 October	Successful
23 October; 16:00	Apogee: 1,100 kilometres (680 mi)					
24 October; 17:33	(United States) Nike-Apache		(United States) Barking Sands		(United States) Sandia	
24 October; 17:33		Sandia	Suborbital	Aeronomy	24 October	Successful
24 October; 17:33	Apogee: 160 kilometres (99 mi)					
27 October; 00:58	(United States) Aerobee-150 (Hi)		(United States) White Sands LC-35		(United States) NASA	
27 October; 00:58		ASE/MIT	Suborbital	XR astronomy	27 October	Successful
27 October; 00:58	Apogee: 192 kilometres (119 mi)					
27 October; 10:50	(United Kingdom) Skylark-7C		(Australia) Woomera LA-2		(United Kingdom) (Australia) RAE/WRE	
27 October; 10:50		UCL	Suborbital	UV Astronomy; X-ray astronomy	27 October	Successful
27 October; 10:50	Apogee: 146 kilometres (91 mi)					
27 October; 16:57	(Canada) Black Brant II		(Canada) Fort Churchill		(United States) US Air Force	
27 October; 16:57		AFCRL	Suborbital	Ionospheric	27 October	Successful
27 October; 16:57	Apogee: 149 kilometres (93 mi)					
27 October; 16:57	(United States) Nike-Cajun		(Canada) Fort Churchill		(United States) US Air Force	
27 October; 16:57		AFCRL	Suborbital	Auroral; Ionospheric	27 October	Successful
27 October; 16:57	Apogee: 136 kilometres (85 mi)					
27 October; 20:25	(United States) Nike-Apache		(United States) Barking Sands		(United States) Sandia	
27 October; 20:25		Sandia	Suborbital	Aeronomy	27 October	Successful
27 October; 20:25	Apogee: 160 kilometres (99 mi)					
28 October	(United States) UGM-27 Polaris A2		(United States) USS Lafayette, ETR		(United States) US Navy	
28 October		US Navy	Suborbital	Missile test	28 October	Successful
28 October	Apogee: 1,000 kilometres (620 mi)					
28 October	(United States) UGM-27 Polaris A2		(United States) USS Lafayette, ETR		(United States) US Navy	
28 October		US Navy	Suborbital	Missile test	28 October	Successful
28 October	Apogee: 1,000 kilometres (620 mi)					
28 October	(United States) UGM-27 Polaris A2		(United States) USS Lafayette, ETR		(United States) US Navy	
28 October		US Navy	Suborbital	Missile test	28 October	Successful
28 October	Apogee: 1,000 kilometres (620 mi)					
28 October	(United States) UGM-27 Polaris A2		(United States) USS Lafayette, ETR		(United States) US Navy	
28 October		US Navy	Suborbital	Missile test	28 October	Successful
28 October	Apogee: 1,000 kilometres (620 mi)					
29 October; 01:59	(Soviet Union) R-36		(Soviet Union) Baikonur Site 67/22		(Soviet Union) RVSN	
29 October; 01:59		RVSN	Suborbital	Missile test	29 October	Successful
29 October; 01:59	Apogee: 868 kilometres (539 mi)					
29 October; 12:15:02	(Soviet Union) R-17 Elbrus		(Soviet Union) Kapustin Yar		(Soviet Union) MVS	
29 October; 12:15:02		MVS	Suborbital	Missile test	29 October	Successful
29 October; 12:15:02	Apogee: 248 kilometres (154 mi)					
29 October; 16:28:13	(United States) LGM-30F Minuteman II		(United States) Cape Canaveral LC-32B		(United States) US Air Force	
29 October; 16:28:13		US Air Force	Suborbital	Missile test	29 October	Successful
29 October; 16:28:13	Apogee: 1,300 kilometres (810 mi)					
29 October; 23:18	(France) Centaure 1		(France) CERES		(Europe) ESRO	
29 October; 23:18		LPA	Suborbital	Aeronomy	29 October	Successful
29 October; 23:18	Apogee: 150 kilometres (93 mi)					
30 October; 19:30	(United States) Aerobee-150 (Hi)		(United States) White Sands LC-35		(United States) NASA	
30 October; 19:30		NASA	Suborbital	Solar	30 October	Successful
30 October; 19:30	Apogee: 189 kilometres (117 mi)					
31 October; 18:04:03	(United States) UGM-27 Polaris A3		(United States) USS Casimir Pulaski, ETR		(United States) US Navy	
31 October; 18:04:03		US Navy	Suborbital	Missile test	31 October	Successful
31 October; 18:04:03	Apogee: 1,000 kilometres (620 mi)					
October	(Soviet Union) A-350Zh		(Soviet Union) Sary Shagan Site 6		(Soviet Union) PRO	
October		PRO	Suborbital	Missile test	October	Successful
October	Apogee: 100 kilometres (62 mi)					
October	(United States) Nike-Apache		(United States) White Sands		(United States) US Army	
October		US Army	Suborbital	Target	October	Successful
October	Apogee: 100 kilometres (62 mi)					
October	(France) Berenice		(France) CERES		(France) ONERA	
October		ONERA	Suborbital	REV Test	October	Successful
October	Apogee: 250 kilometres (160 mi)					
October	(France) Berenice		(France) CERES		(France) ONERA	
October		ONERA	Suborbital	REV Test	October	Successful
October	Apogee: 250 kilometres (160 mi)					
=== November ===
1 November; 06:00	(United States) Nike-Apache		(Canada) Fort Churchill		(United States) NASA	
1 November; 06:00		NASA	Suborbital	Aeronomy	1 November	Successful
1 November; 06:00	Apogee: 182 kilometres (113 mi)					
1 November; 06:15	(United States) Nike-Apache		(United States) Barking Sands		(United States) Sandia	
1 November; 06:15		Sandia	Suborbital	Aeronomy	1 November	Successful
1 November; 06:15	Apogee: 140 kilometres (87 mi)					
1 November; 06:18	(United States) Nike-Apache		(United States) Barking Sands		(United States) Sandia	
1 November; 06:18		Sandia	Suborbital	Aeronomy	1 November	Successful
1 November; 06:18	Apogee: 160 kilometres (99 mi)					
2 November; 09:03	(Japan) Kappa-8L		(Japan) Kagoshima		(Japan) ISAS	
2 November; 09:03		TAO	Suborbital	Aeronomy	2 November	Successful
2 November; 09:03	Apogee: 156 kilometres (97 mi)					
3 November; 00:00	(United States) LGM-30B Minuteman IB		(United States) Vandenberg LF-08		(United States) Strategic Air Command	
3 November; 00:00		Strategic Air Command	Suborbital	Missile test	3 November	Successful
3 November; 00:00	Apogee: 1,300 kilometres (810 mi)					
3 November; 00:35	(United States) LGM-30B Minuteman IB		(United States) Vandenberg LF-03		(United States) Strategic Air Command	
3 November; 00:35		Strategic Air Command	Suborbital	Missile test	3 November	Successful
3 November; 00:35	Apogee: 1,300 kilometres (810 mi)					
3 November; 07:57	(United States) Aerobee-150 (Hi)		(United States) White Sands LC-35		(United States) NASA	
3 November; 07:57		Princeton	Suborbital	UV Astronomy	3 November	Successful
3 November; 07:57	Apogee: 127 kilometres (79 mi)					
3 November; 10:02	(United States) Nike-Apache		(United States) Eglin		(United States) US Air Force	
3 November; 10:02		AFCRL	Suborbital	Aeronomy; Ionospheric	3 November	Successful
3 November; 10:02	Apogee: 209 kilometres (130 mi)					
3 November; 17:32	(United States) Nike-Apache		(United States) Barking Sands		(United States) Sandia	
3 November; 17:32		Sandia	Suborbital	Aeronomy	3 November	Successful
3 November; 17:32	Apogee: 160 kilometres (99 mi)					
3 November; 17:38	(United States) Nike-Cajun		(United States) Wallops Island		(United States) NASA	
3 November; 17:38		NASA	Suborbital	Aeronomy	3 November	Successful
3 November; 17:38	Apogee: 122 kilometres (76 mi)					
4 November; 08:31	(France) Centaure 1		(Argentina) CELPA		(France) CNIE	
4 November; 08:31		ONUSJ	Suborbital	Aeronomy	4 November	Successful
4 November; 08:31	Apogee: 175 kilometres (109 mi)					
4 November; 16:35	(France) Véronique		(Algeria) Hammaguira Blandine		(France) CNES	
4 November; 16:35		CNRS	Suborbital	Solar	4 November	Successful
4 November; 16:35	Apogee: 150 kilometres (93 mi)					
4 November; 17:00	(United States) LGM-25C Titan II		(United States) Vandenberg LC-395D		(United States) Strategic Air Command	
4 November; 17:00		Strategic Air Command	Suborbital	Missile test	4 November	Successful
4 November; 17:00	Apogee: 1,300 kilometres (810 mi)					
4 November	(United States) LGM-30A Minuteman IA		(United States) Vandenberg LF-06		(United States) Strategic Air Command	
4 November		Strategic Air Command	Suborbital	Missile test	4 November	Successful
4 November	Apogee: 1,300 kilometres (810 mi)					
5 November; 03:01	(Japan) Kappa-9M		(Japan) Kagoshima		(Japan) ISAS	
5 November; 03:01		ISAS	Suborbital	Ionospheric	5 November	Successful
5 November; 03:01	Apogee: 356 kilometres (221 mi)					
5 November; 17:00	(United States) Nike-Cajun		(United States) Wallops Island		(United States) NASA	
5 November; 17:00		NASA	Suborbital	Aeronomy	5 November	Successful
5 November; 17:00	Apogee: 122 kilometres (76 mi)					
5 November; 19:03	(United States) Javelin		(United States) Wallops Island		(United States) NASA	
5 November; 19:03		Johns Hopkins	Suborbital	Aeronomy	5 November	Successful
5 November; 19:03	Apogee: 867 kilometres (539 mi)					
5 November; 20:38	(United States) Nike-Apache		(Canada) Fort Churchill		(United States) NASA	
5 November; 20:38		BRL	Suborbital	Fields; Ionospheric	5 November	Successful
5 November; 20:38	Apogee: 145 kilometres (90 mi)					
5 November; 20:39	(United States) Javelin		(Canada) Fort Churchill		(United States) NASA	
5 November; 20:39		BRL	Suborbital	Ionospheric	5 November	Successful
5 November; 20:39	Apogee: 840 kilometres (520 mi)					
5 November; 23:16	(France) Centaure 1		(Argentina) CELPA		(France) CNIE	
5 November; 23:16		ONUSJ	Suborbital	Aeronomy	5 November	Successful
5 November; 23:16	Apogee: 176 kilometres (109 mi)					
5 November	(United States) LGM-30B Minuteman IB		(United States) Vandenberg LF-09		(United States) Strategic Air Command	
5 November		Strategic Air Command	Suborbital	Missile test	5 November	Successful
5 November	Apogee: 1,300 kilometres (810 mi)					
5 November	(France) Centaure 1		(Algeria) Hammaguira Bacchus		(France) CNES	
5 November		CNRS	Suborbital	Aeronomy	5 November	Successful
5 November	Apogee: 150 kilometres (93 mi)					
5 November	(France) Centaure 1		(Algeria) Hammaguira Bacchus		(France) CNES	
5 November		CNRS	Suborbital	Aeronomy	5 November	Successful
5 November	Apogee: 150 kilometres (93 mi)					
5 November	(France) Centaure 1		(France) CERES		(France) CNES	
5 November		CNRS	Suborbital	Aeronomy	5 November	Successful
5 November	Apogee: 150 kilometres (93 mi)					
5 November	(France) Centaure 1		(France) Reggane		(France) CNES	
5 November		CNRS	Suborbital	Aeronomy	5 November	Successful
5 November	Apogee: 150 kilometres (93 mi)					
5 November	(France) Centaure 1		(France) Reggane		(France) CNES	
5 November		CNRS	Suborbital	Aeronomy	5 November	Successful
5 November	Apogee: 150 kilometres (93 mi)					
6 November; 00:02	(United States) Nike-Cajun		(United States) Wallops Island		(United States) NASA	
6 November; 00:02		NASA	Suborbital	Aeronomy	6 November	Successful
6 November; 00:02	Apogee: 120 kilometres (75 mi)					
6 November; 00:08	(United States) Nike-Apache		(India) Thumba		(United States) NASA	
6 November; 00:08		ISRO	Suborbital	Aeronomy	6 November	Successful
6 November; 00:08	Apogee: 192 kilometres (119 mi)					
6 November; 05:20	(United States) Nike-Cajun		(United States) Wallops Island		(United States) NASA	
6 November; 05:20		NASA	Suborbital	Aeronomy	6 November	Successful
6 November; 05:20	Apogee: 120 kilometres (75 mi)					
6 November; 08:31	(France) Centaure 1		(Argentina) CELPA		(France) CINE	
6 November; 08:31		ONUSJ	Suborbital	Aeronomy	6 November	Successful
6 November; 08:31	Apogee: 179 kilometres (111 mi)					
6 November; 10:00	(United States) Nike-Cajun		(United States) Wallops Island		(United States) NASA	
6 November; 10:00		NASA	Suborbital	Aeronomy	6 November	Successful
6 November; 10:00	Apogee: 125 kilometres (78 mi)					
6 November; 13:45	(United Kingdom) Black Knight 301		(Australia) Woomera LA-5		(United Kingdom) RAE	
6 November; 13:45		UCL	Suborbital	REV Test; Aeronomy	6 November	Successful
6 November; 13:45	Apogee: 629 kilometres (391 mi)					
6 November	(United States) LGM-30B Minuteman IB		(United States) Vandenberg LF-02		(United States) Strategic Air Command	
6 November		Strategic Air Command	Suborbital	Missile test	6 November	Launch failure
6 November	(United States) LGM-30B Minuteman IB		(United States) Vandenberg LF-07		(United States) Strategic Air Command	
6 November		Strategic Air Command	Suborbital	Missile test	6 November	Successful
6 November	Apogee: 1,300 kilometres (810 mi)					
6 November	(United States) Nike-Tomahawk		(United States) Barking Sands		(United States) Sandia	
6 November		Sandia	Suborbital	Aeronomy	6 November	Successful
6 November	Apogee: 289 kilometres (180 mi)					
6 November	(France) Centaure 1		(France) Reggane		(France) CNES	
6 November		CNRS	Suborbital	Aeronomy	6 November	Successful
6 November	Apogee: 150 kilometres (93 mi)					
6 November	(France) Centaure 1		(France) CERES		(France) CNES	
6 November		CNRS	Suborbital	Aeronomy	6 November	Successful
6 November	Apogee: 150 kilometres (93 mi)					
7 November; 01:38	(United States) Nike-Cajun		(United States) Wallops Island		(United States) NASA	
7 November; 01:38		NASA	Suborbital	Test flight	7 November	Successful
7 November; 01:38	Apogee: 110 kilometres (68 mi)					
7 November; 03:21	(United States) Athena RTV		(United States) Green River Pad 1		(United States) US Air Force	
7 November; 03:21		US Air Force	Suborbital	REV Test	7 November	Successful
7 November; 03:21	Apogee: 260 kilometres (160 mi)					
7 November; 05:13	(United States) Nike-Apache		(Canada) Fort Churchill		(United States) NASA	
7 November; 05:13		BRL	Suborbital	Ionospheric	7 November	Successful
7 November; 05:13	Apogee: 149 kilometres (93 mi)					
7 November; 05:14	(United States) Javelin		(Canada) Fort Churchill		(United States) NASA	
7 November; 05:14		BRL/Michigan	Suborbital	Ionospheric	7 November	Successful
7 November; 05:14	Apogee: 714 kilometres (444 mi)					
7 November; 10:31	(United States) Aerobee-150 (Hi)		(United States) White Sands LC-35		(United States) NASA	
7 November; 10:31		NASA	Suborbital	UV Astronomy	7 November	Successful
7 November; 10:31	Apogee: 213 kilometres (132 mi)					
8 November; 08:22	(France) Véronique		(Algeria) Hammaguira Blandine		(France) CNES	
8 November; 08:22		CNRS	Suborbital	Solar	8 November	Launch failure
8 November; 08:22	Apogee: 98 kilometres (61 mi)					
9 November; 12:54	(United States) Nike-Apache		(India) Thumba		(United States) NASA	
9 November; 12:54		ISRO	Suborbital	Aeronomy	9 November	Successful
9 November; 12:54	Apogee: 192 kilometres (119 mi)					
9 November	(United States) LGM-30A Minuteman IA		(United States) Vandenberg LF-05		(United States) Strategic Air Command	
9 November		Strategic Air Command	Suborbital	Missile test	9 November	Successful
9 November	Apogee: 1,300 kilometres (810 mi)					
9 November	(United States) Nike-Tomahawk		(United States) Barking Sands		(United States) Sandia	
9 November		Sandia	Suborbital	Aeronomy	9 November	Successful
9 November	Apogee: 289 kilometres (180 mi)					
10 November; 00:05	(United States) Nike-Apache		(India) Thumba		(United States) NASA	
10 November; 00:05		ISRO	Suborbital	Aeronomy	10 November	Successful
10 November; 00:05	Apogee: 192 kilometres (119 mi)					
10 November; 02:05	(Japan) Kappa-8L		(Japan) Kagoshima		(Japan) ISAS	
10 November; 02:05		Osaka	Suborbital	Ionospheric	10 November	Successful
10 November; 02:05	Apogee: 145 kilometres (90 mi)					
10 November; 11:07	(United States) Nike-Apache		(United States) Wallops Island		(United States) NASA	
10 November; 11:07		Urbana-Champaign	Suborbital	Ionospheric	10 November	Successful
10 November; 11:07	Apogee: 251 kilometres (156 mi)					
10 November; 22:25	(United States) Nike-Apache		(United States) AO-4 LP-1		(United States) NASA	
10 November; 22:25		GCA	Suborbital	Aeronomy	10 November	Successful
10 November; 22:25	Apogee: 200 kilometres (120 mi)					
10 November; 22:28	(United States) Nike-Apache		(United States) Wallops Island		(United States) NASA	
10 November; 22:28		GCA	Suborbital	Aeronomy	10 November	Successful
10 November; 22:28	Apogee: 198 kilometres (123 mi)					
10 November	(United States) Nike-Apache		(United States) Eglin		(United States) US Air Force	
10 November		US Air Force	Suborbital	Aeronomy	10 November	Successful
10 November	Apogee: 200 kilometres (120 mi)					
10 November	(United States) Nike-Apache		(United States) Eglin		(United States) US Air Force	
10 November		US Air Force	Suborbital	Aeronomy	10 November	Successful
10 November	Apogee: 200 kilometres (120 mi)					
11 November; 09:59	(United States) HAD		(Australia) Woomera LA-2		(Australia) WRE	
11 November; 09:59		WRE	Suborbital	Aeronomy	11 November	Successful
11 November; 09:59	Apogee: 100 kilometres (62 mi)					
11 November; 22:24	(United States) Nike-Apache		(United States) USS Croatan, AO-4 LP-2		(United States) NASA	
11 November; 22:24		GCA	Suborbital	Aeronomy	11 November	Successful
11 November; 22:24	Apogee: 156 kilometres (97 mi)					
11 November; 22:27	(United States) Nike-Apache		(United States) Wallops Island		(United States) NASA	
11 November; 22:27		GCA	Suborbital	Aeronomy	11 November	Successful
11 November; 22:27	Apogee: 202 kilometres (126 mi)					
12 November; 03:05	(Japan) Kappa-8L		(Japan) Kagoshima		(Japan) ISAS	
12 November; 03:05		Osaka	Suborbital	Aeronomy	12 November	Successful
12 November; 03:05	Apogee: 100 kilometres (62 mi)					
12 November; 10:00	(United States) HAD		(Australia) Woomera LA-2		(Australia) WRE	
12 November; 10:00		WRE	Suborbital	Aeronomy	12 November	Successful
12 November; 10:00	Apogee: 103 kilometres (64 mi)					
12 November; 10:53	(United States) Nike-Apache		(United States) USS Croatan, AO-4 LP-3		(United States) NASA	
12 November; 10:53		GCA	Suborbital	Aeronomy	12 November	Successful
12 November; 10:53	Apogee: 204 kilometres (127 mi)					
12 November; 10:56	(United States) Nike-Apache		(United States) Wallops Island		(United States) NASA	
12 November; 10:56		GCA	Suborbital	Aeronomy	12 November	Successful
12 November; 10:56	Apogee: 204 kilometres (127 mi)					
12 November; 19:30	(United States) Aerobee-150 (Hi)		(United States) White Sands LC-35		(United States) NRL	
12 November; 19:30		NRL	Suborbital	Solar	12 November	Successful
12 November; 19:30	Apogee: 189 kilometres (117 mi)					
13 November; 16:57:03	(United States) UGM-27 Polaris A3		(United States) USS Casimir Pulaski, ETR		(United States) US Navy	
13 November; 16:57:03		US Navy	Suborbital	Missile test	13 November	Successful
13 November; 16:57:03	Apogee: 1,000 kilometres (620 mi)					
13 November	(United States) Nike-Tomahawk		(United States) Barking Sands		(United States) Sandia	
13 November		Sandia	Suborbital	Aeronomy	13 November	Successful
13 November	Apogee: 308 kilometres (191 mi)					
14 November; 10:23	(United States) Aerobee-150 (Hi)		(United States) White Sands LC-35		(United States) NASA	
14 November; 10:23		NASA	Suborbital	UV Astronomy	14 November	Successful
14 November; 10:23	Apogee: 207 kilometres (129 mi)					
16 November; 06:57	(United States) Thor DSV-2J		(United States) Johnston LE-1		(United States) US Air Force	
16 November; 06:57		US Air Force	Suborbital	ABM test	16 November	Successful
16 November; 06:57	Apogee: 1,148 kilometres (713 mi)					
16 November; 18:18	(United States) Aerobee-150A		(United States) Wallops Island		(United States) NASA	
16 November; 18:18		NASA	Suborbital	Aeronomy	16 November	Successful
16 November; 18:18	Apogee: 188 kilometres (117 mi)					
16 November; 18:31	(United States) Aerobee-150 (Hi)		(United States) White Sands LC-35		(United States) NASA	
16 November; 18:31		NASA	Suborbital	Meteorite research	16 November	Successful
16 November; 18:31	Apogee: 157 kilometres (98 mi)					
17 November; 17:49	(United States) Nike-Apache		(United States) USS Croatan, AO-4 LP-4		(United States) NASA	
17 November; 17:49		Michigan	Suborbital	Aeronomy	17 November	Successful
17 November; 17:49	Apogee: 194 kilometres (121 mi)					
17 November; 21:10	(United States) Nike-Cajun		(United States) USS Croatan, AO-4 LP-5		(United States) NASA	
17 November; 21:10		Michigan	Suborbital	Aeronomy	17 November	Successful
17 November; 21:10	Apogee: 160 kilometres (99 mi)					
17 November			(Soviet Union) Kapustin Yar		(Soviet Union) MVS	
17 November		MVS	Suborbital	Missile test	17 November	Successful
17 November	Apogee: 200 kilometres (120 mi)					
18 November; 11:23:00	(United States) Nike-Apache		(United States) Eglin		(United States) US Air Force	
18 November; 11:23:00		AFCRL	Suborbital	Aeronomy	18 November	Launch failure
18 November; 11:23:00	Apogee: 143 kilometres (89 mi)					
18 November	(United States) Nike-Tomahawk		(United States) Barking Sands		(United States) Sandia	
18 November		Sandia	Suborbital	Aeronomy	18 November	Successful
18 November	Apogee: 309 kilometres (192 mi)					
18 November	(United States) MGM-31 Pershing I		(United States) Hueco		(United States) US Army	
18 November		US Army	Suborbital	Missile test	18 November	Successful
18 November	Apogee: 250 kilometres (160 mi)					
18 November	(United States) MGM-31 Pershing I		(United States) Hueco		(United States) US Army	
18 November		US Army	Suborbital	Missile test	18 November	Successful
18 November	Apogee: 250 kilometres (160 mi)					
19 November; 05:34	(United States) Nike-Apache		(United States) Eglin		(United States) US Air Force	
19 November; 05:34		AFCRL	Suborbital	Aeronomy	19 November	Successful
19 November; 05:34	Apogee: 142 kilometres (88 mi)					
19 November; 17:15	(United States) Aerobee-150 (Hi)		(United States) White Sands LC-35		(United States) NRL	
19 November; 17:15		NRL	Suborbital	Solar	19 November	Successful
19 November; 17:15	Apogee: 219 kilometres (136 mi)					
19 November; 18:34	(United States) Nike-Apache		(United States) USS Croatan, AO-4 LP-6		(United States) NASA	
19 November; 18:34		Michigan	Suborbital	Aeronomy	19 November	Launch failure
19 November; 18:34	Apogee: 14 kilometres (8.7 mi)					
19 November; 19:02	(United States) Nike-Cajun		(United States) Wallops Island		(United States) NASA	
19 November; 19:02		NASA	Suborbital	Aeronomy	19 November	Successful
19 November; 19:02	Apogee: 125 kilometres (78 mi)					
19 November; 20:20	(United States) Nike-Apache		(United States) Wallops Island		(United States) NASA	
19 November; 20:20		Urbana-Champaign	Suborbital	Ionospheric	19 November	Successful
19 November; 20:20	Apogee: 167 kilometres (104 mi)					
19 November; 22:02	(United States) Nike-Apache		(United States) USS Croatan, AO-4 LP-7		(United States) NASA	
19 November; 22:02		Urbana-Champaign	Suborbital	Ionospheric	19 November	Successful
19 November; 22:02	Apogee: 170 kilometres (110 mi)					
19 November; 23:43	(United States) Nike-Apache		(United States) Eglin		(United States) US Air Force	
19 November; 23:43		AFCRL	Suborbital	Aeronomy	19 November	Successful
19 November; 23:43	Apogee: 200 kilometres (120 mi)					
19 November	(United States) MGM-31 Pershing I		(United States) Hueco		(United States) US Army	
19 November		US Army	Suborbital	Missile test	19 November	Successful
19 November	Apogee: 250 kilometres (160 mi)					
19 November	(United States) MGM-31 Pershing I		(United States) Hueco		(United States) US Army	
19 November		US Army	Suborbital	Missile test	19 November	Launch failure
19 November	Apogee: 250 kilometres (160 mi)					
19 November			(Soviet Union) Kapustin Yar		(Soviet Union) MVS	
19 November		MVS	Suborbital	Missile test	19 November	Successful
19 November	Apogee: 200 kilometres (120 mi)					
21 November	(United States) Nike-Tomahawk		(United States) Barking Sands		(United States) Sandia	
21 November		Sandia	Suborbital	Aeronomy	21 November	Successful
21 November	Apogee: 270 kilometres (170 mi)					
22 November; 16:30	(United States) Nike-Cajun		(United States) Eglin		(United States) US Air Force	
22 November; 16:30		US Air Force	Suborbital	Ionospheric	22 November	Successful
22 November; 16:30	Apogee: 110 kilometres (68 mi)					
23 November; 17:07	(United States) Nike-Apache		(United States) Wallops Island		(United States) NASA	
23 November; 17:07		NASA	Suborbital	Ionospheric	23 November	Successful
23 November; 17:07	Apogee: 178 kilometres (111 mi)					
24 November	(United States) Nike Javelin		(United States) Eglin		(United States) Air Force Air Proving Ground Command (AGPC)	
24 November		AGPC	Suborbital	Aeronomy	24 November	Launch failure
24 November	Apogee: 1 kilometre (0.62 mi)					
24 November	(United States) Nike-Tomahawk		(United States) Barking Sands		(United States) Sandia	
24 November		Sandia	Suborbital	Aeronomy	24 November	Successful
24 November	Apogee: 300 kilometres (190 mi)					
25 November; 11:34	(United States) Aerobee-150 (Hi)		(United States) White Sands LC-35		(United States) NRL	
25 November; 11:34		NRL	Suborbital	XR astronomy	25 November	Successful
25 November; 11:34	Apogee: 200 kilometres (120 mi)					
27 November; 08:02	(Canada) Black Brant II		(Canada) Fort Churchill		(Canada) NRCC	
27 November; 08:02		NRCC	Suborbital	Auroral; Ionospheric; Micrometeoroid research	27 November	Successful
27 November; 08:02	Apogee: 170 kilometres (110 mi)					
27 November; 13:31	(United States) Nike-Iroquois		(United States) Eglin		(United States) US Air Force	
27 November; 13:31		AFCRL	Suborbital	Test flight	27 November	Successful
27 November; 13:31	Apogee: 201 kilometres (125 mi)					
27 November; 17:38	(France) Centaure 1		(Algeria) Hammaguira Bacchus		(France) CNES	
27 November; 17:38		MPE	Suborbital	Aeronomy	27 November	Successful
27 November; 17:38	Apogee: 166 kilometres (103 mi)					
28 November; 11:14:26	(Soviet Union) R-17 Elbrus		(Soviet Union) Kapustin Yar		(Soviet Union) MVS	
28 November; 11:14:26		MVS	Suborbital	Missile test	28 November	Successful
28 November; 11:14:26	Apogee: 250 kilometres (160 mi)					
28 November	(United States) Athena RTV		(United States) Green River Pad 3		(United States) US Air Force	
28 November		US Air Force	Suborbital	REV Test	28 November	Launch failure
30 November; 13:11	(United States) Nike-Apache		(Pakistan) Sonmiani		(United States) NASA	
30 November; 13:11		SUPARCO	Suborbital	Aeronomy	30 November	Successful
30 November; 13:11	Apogee: 207 kilometres (129 mi)					
30 November; 17:37	(France) Centaure 1		(Algeria) Hammaguira Bacchus		(France) CNES	
30 November; 17:37		MPE	Suborbital	Aeronomy	30 November	Successful
30 November; 17:37	Apogee: 207 kilometres (129 mi)					
30 November	(United States) Honest John-Nike-Nike		(United States) Barking Sands		(United States) Sandia	
30 November		NASA	Suborbital	Test flight	30 November	Successful
30 November	Apogee: 168 kilometres (104 mi)					
30 November	(United States) Nike-Tomahawk		(United States) Barking Sands		(United States) Sandia	
30 November		Sandia	Suborbital	Test flight	30 November	Successful
30 November	Apogee: 293 kilometres (182 mi)					
November	(United States) Nike-Javelin		(United States) White Sands		(United States) DASA	
November		DASA	Suborbital	Aeronomy	November	Successful
November	Apogee: 100 kilometres (62 mi)					
November	(United States) Nike-Javelin		(United States) White Sands		(United States) DASA	
November		DASA	Suborbital	Aeronomy	November	Successful
November	Apogee: 100 kilometres (62 mi)					
November	(United States) Nike-Javelin		(United States) White Sands		(United States) DASA	
November		DASA	Suborbital	Aeronomy	November	Successful
November	Apogee: 100 kilometres (62 mi)					
November	(United States) Nike-Javelin		(United States) White Sands		(United States) DASA	
November		DASA	Suborbital	Aeronomy	November	Successful
November	Apogee: 100 kilometres (62 mi)					
November	(United States) Nike-Javelin		(United States) White Sands		(United States) DASA	
November		DASA	Suborbital	Aeronomy	November	Successful
November	Apogee: 100 kilometres (62 mi)					
November	(United States) Nike-Javelin		(United States) White Sands		(United States) DASA	
November		DASA	Suborbital	Aeronomy	November	Successful
November	Apogee: 100 kilometres (62 mi)					
=== December ===
1 December; 01:20	(United States) Nike-Apache		(Pakistan) Sonmiani		(United States) NASA	
1 December; 01:20		SUPARCO	Suborbital	Aeronomy	1 December	Successful
1 December; 01:20	Apogee: 200 kilometres (120 mi)					
1 December; 04:20	(United States) Nike-Cajun		(Argentina) CELPA		(United States) NASA	
1 December; 04:20		TUC	Suborbital	Ionospheric	1 December	Successful
1 December; 04:20	Apogee: 134 kilometres (83 mi)					
1 December; 06:15	(United States) Aerobee-150 (Hi)		(United States) White Sands LC-35		(United States) NASA	
1 December; 06:15		NASA	Suborbital	Aeronomy	1 December	Successful
1 December; 06:15	Apogee: 182 kilometres (113 mi)					
1 December; 08:45:04	(United States) SM-65D Atlas		(United States) Vandenberg LC-576A-1		(United States) Strategic Air Command	
1 December; 08:45:04		Strategic Air Command	Suborbital	REV Test	1 December	Successful
1 December; 08:45:04	Apogee: 1,800 kilometres (1,100 mi)					
1 December	(United States) Nike-Tomahawk		(United States) Barking Sands		(United States) Sandia	
1 December		Sandia	Suborbital	Test flight	1 December	Launch failure
1 December	Apogee: 270 kilometres (170 mi)					
2 December; 16:30:04	(United States) UGM-27 Polaris A3		(United States) USS Stonewall Jackson, ETR		(United States) US Navy	
2 December; 16:30:04		US Navy	Suborbital	Missile test	2 December	Successful
2 December; 16:30:04	Apogee: 1,000 kilometres (620 mi)					
3 December; 17:40	(France) Dragon		(Algeria) Hammaguira Bacchus		(France) CNES	
3 December; 17:40		CNES	Suborbital	Aeronomy	3 December	Successful
3 December; 17:40	Apogee: 390 kilometres (240 mi)					
4 December; 11:09:17	(United States) SM-65D Atlas		(United States) Vandenberg LC-576A-3		(United States) Strategic Air Command	
4 December; 11:09:17		Strategic Air Command	Suborbital	Target	4 December	Successful
4 December; 11:09:17	Apogee: 1,800 kilometres (1,100 mi)					
4 December; 18:06	(United States) Nike-Cajun		(Argentina) CELPA		(United States) NASA	
4 December; 18:06		TUC	Suborbital	Ionospheric	4 December	Successful
4 December; 18:06	Apogee: 123 kilometres (76 mi)					
5 December; 04:30	(United States) Athena RTV		(United States) Green River Pad 2		(United States) US Air Force	
5 December; 04:30		US Air Force	Suborbital	REV Test	5 December	Successful
5 December; 04:30	Apogee: 200 kilometres (120 mi)					
7 December; 17:56	(United States) Nike-Apache		(United States) Wallops Island		(United States) NASA	
7 December; 17:56		New Hampshire	Suborbital	Magnetospheric	7 December	Successful
7 December; 17:56	Apogee: 145 kilometres (90 mi)					
8 December; 10:26	(United States) HAD		(Australia) Woomera LA-2		(Australia) WRE	
8 December; 10:26		WRE	Suborbital	Aeronomy	8 December	Successful
8 December; 10:26	Apogee: 100 kilometres (62 mi)					
8 December; 22:55	(United States) Aerobee-150 (Hi)		(United States) White Sands LC-35		(United States) US Air Force	
8 December; 22:55		US Air Force	Suborbital	Solar	8 December	Successful
8 December; 22:55	Apogee: 200 kilometres (120 mi)					
8 December	(United States) HGM-25A Titan I		(United States) Vandenberg LC-395A-1		(United States) Strategic Air Command	
8 December		Strategic Air Command	Suborbital	Missile test	8 December	Successful
8 December	Apogee: 1,000 kilometres (620 mi)					
9 December; 08:00	(United States) LGM-30B Minuteman IB		(United States) Vandenberg LF-08		(United States) Strategic Air Command	
9 December; 08:00		Strategic Air Command	Suborbital	Missile test	9 December	Launch failure
9 December; 20:00	(United States) LGM-30B Minuteman IB		(United States) Vandenberg LF-02		(United States) Strategic Air Command	
9 December; 20:00		Strategic Air Command	Suborbital	Missile test	9 December	Successful
9 December; 20:00	Apogee: 1,300 kilometres (810 mi)					
10 December; 10:26	(United States) HAD		(Australia) Woomera LA-2		(Australia) WRE	
10 December; 10:26		WRE	Suborbital	Aeronomy	10 December	Successful
10 December; 10:26	Apogee: 100 kilometres (62 mi)					
11 December	(United States) Aerobee-150 (Hi)		(United Kingdom) Walker Cay		(United States) NOTS	
11 December		NOTS	Suborbital	Radiation	11 December	Successful
11 December	Apogee: 200 kilometres (120 mi)					
15 December; 00:00	(Soviet Union) R-36		(Soviet Union) Baikonur Site 67/22		(Soviet Union) RVSN	
15 December; 00:00		RVSN	Suborbital	Missile test	15 December	Successful
15 December; 00:00	Apogee: 870 kilometres (540 mi)					
15 December; 17:59:59	(United States) LGM-30F Minuteman II		(United States) Cape Canaveral LC-32B		(United States) US Air Force	
15 December; 17:59:59		US Air Force	Suborbital	Missile test	15 December	Successful
15 December; 17:59:59	Apogee: 1,300 kilometres (810 mi)					
15 December	(Soviet Union) R-12 Dvina		(Soviet Union) Kapustin Yar		(Soviet Union) MVS	
15 December		MVS	Suborbital	Missile test	15 December	Successful
15 December	Apogee: 402 kilometres (250 mi)					
16 December; 02:02	(United Kingdom) Skylark 3		(Australia) Woomera LA-2		(United Kingdom) (Australia) RAE/WRE	
16 December; 02:02		RAE/WRE	Suborbital	Test flight	16 December	Successful
16 December; 02:02	Apogee: 220 kilometres (140 mi)					
16 December; 14:30	(United States) Aerobee-150 (Hi)		(United States) White Sands LC-35		(United States) NASA	
16 December; 14:30		NASA	Suborbital	Meteorite research	16 December	Successful
16 December; 14:30	Apogee: 207 kilometres (129 mi)					
16 December; 14:57	(United States) Nike-Apache		(United States) White Sands		(United States) NASA	
16 December; 14:57		NASA	Suborbital	Ionospheric	16 December	Successful
16 December; 14:57	Apogee: 195 kilometres (121 mi)					
16 December; 16:34:03	(United States) UGM-27 Polaris A3		(United States) USS Stonewall Jackson, ETR		(United States) US Navy	
16 December; 16:34:03		US Navy	Suborbital	Missile test	16 December	Successful
16 December; 16:34:03	Apogee: 1,000 kilometres (620 mi)					
16 December	(United States) Sparrow-Arcas		(United States) San Nicolas		(United States) US Navy	
16 December		US Navy	Suborbital	Weather	16 December	Successful
16 December	Apogee: 100 kilometres (62 mi)					
17 December; 03:05	(United Kingdom) Skylark-7C		(Australia) Woomera LA-2		(United Kingdom) (Australia) RAE/WRE	
17 December; 03:05		CULH	Suborbital	Solar	17 December	Successful
17 December; 03:05	Apogee: 167 kilometres (104 mi)					
17 December; 06:55	(United States) Aerobee-150 (Hi)		(United States) White Sands LC-35		(United States) NASA	
17 December; 06:55		Johns Hopkins	Suborbital	Aeronomy	17 December	Successful
17 December; 06:55	Apogee: 235 kilometres (146 mi)					
17 December; 19:54:00	(United States) Nike-Cajun		(United States) Point Mugu		(United States) US Navy	
17 December; 19:54:00		US Navy	Suborbital	Aeronomy	17 December	
17 December; 19:54:00	Apogee: 100 kilometres (62 mi)					
17 December	(United States) Sparrow-Arcas		(United States) San Nicolas		(United States) US Navy	
17 December		US Navy	Suborbital	Weather	17 December	Successful
17 December	Apogee: 100 kilometres (62 mi)					
18 December	(France) Rubis		(Algeria) Hammaguira Bacchus		(France) ONERA	
18 December		ONERA	Suborbital	Test flight	18 December	Launch failure
18 December	Apogee: 60 kilometres (37 mi)					
18 December	(United States) LGM-30B Minuteman IB		(United States) Vandenberg LF-07		(United States) Strategic Air Command	
18 December		Strategic Air Command	Suborbital	Missile test	18 December	Successful
18 December	Apogee: 1,300 kilometres (810 mi)					
18 December	(Soviet Union) R-14 Usovaya		(Soviet Union) Kapustin Yar		(Soviet Union) RVSN	
18 December		RVSN	Suborbital	Missile test	18 December	Successful
18 December	Apogee: 675 kilometres (419 mi)					
18 December	(Soviet Union) R-16U		(Soviet Union) Baikonur Site 41/3		(Soviet Union) RVSN	
18 December		RVSN	Suborbital	Missile test	18 December	Successful
18 December	Apogee: 1,210 kilometres (750 mi)					
19 December; 01:06:12	(United States) LGM-30F Minuteman II		(United States) Cape Canaveral LC-31B		(United States) US Air Force	
19 December; 01:06:12		US Air Force	Suborbital	Missile test	19 December	Successful
19 December; 01:06:12	Apogee: 1,300 kilometres (810 mi)					
21 December; 09:44:59	(Soviet Union) R-17 Elbrus		(Soviet Union) Kapustin Yar		(Soviet Union) MVS	
21 December; 09:44:59		MVS	Suborbital	Missile test	21 December	Successful
21 December; 09:44:59	Apogee: 250 kilometres (160 mi)					
22 December; 04:00	(United States) Blue Scout Junior SLV-1B		(United States) Vandenberg PALC-A		(United States) US Air Force	
22 December; 04:00		EOS; WPAT	Suborbital	Technology	22 December	Launch failure
22 December; 04:00	Apogee: 500 kilometres (310 mi)					
22 December; 16:30:04	(United States) UGM-27 Polaris A3		(United States) USS Von Steuben, ETR		(United States) US Navy	
22 December; 16:30:04		US Navy	Suborbital	Missile test	22 December	Successful
22 December; 16:30:04	Apogee: 1,000 kilometres (620 mi)					
22 December; 19:15:20	(United States) SM-65F Atlas		(United States) Vandenberg LC-576E		(United States) Strategic Air Command	
22 December; 19:15:20		Strategic Air Command	Suborbital	Missile test	22 December	Successful
22 December; 19:15:20	Apogee: 1,400 kilometres (870 mi)					
22 December	(Soviet Union) R-12 Dvina		(Soviet Union) Kapustin Yar		(Soviet Union) MVS	
22 December		MVS	Suborbital	Missile test	22 December	Successful
22 December	Apogee: 402 kilometres (250 mi)					
23 December	(Soviet Union) R-12 Dvina		(Soviet Union) Kapustin Yar		(Soviet Union) MVS	
23 December		MVS	Suborbital	Missile test	23 December	Successful
23 December	Apogee: 402 kilometres (250 mi)					
26 December	(Soviet Union) R-12 Dvina		(Soviet Union) Kapustin Yar		(Soviet Union) MVS	
26 December		MVS	Suborbital	Missile test	26 December	Successful
26 December	Apogee: 402 kilometres (250 mi)					
26 December	(Soviet Union) R-12 Dvina		(Soviet Union) Kapustin Yar		(Soviet Union) MVS	
26 December		MVS	Suborbital	Missile test	26 December	Successful
26 December	Apogee: 402 kilometres (250 mi)					
26 December	(Soviet Union) R-16U		(Soviet Union) Baikonur Site 41/3		(Soviet Union) RVSN	
26 December		RVSN	Suborbital	Missile test	26 December	Successful
26 December	Apogee: 1,210 kilometres (750 mi)					
December	(United States) Nike-Apache		(United States) White Sands		(United States) US Army	
December		US Army	Suborbital	Target	December	Successful
December	Apogee: 100 kilometres (62 mi)					
December	(United States) Nike-Javelin		(United States) White Sands		(United States) DASA	
December		DASA	Suborbital	Aeronomy	December	Successful
December	Apogee: 100 kilometres (62 mi)					
December	(United States) Nike-Javelin		(United States) White Sands		(United States) DASA	
December		DASA	Suborbital	Aeronomy	December	Successful
December	Apogee: 100 kilometres (62 mi)					
Unknown	(Soviet Union) A-350Zh		(Soviet Union) Sary Shagan Site 6		(Soviet Union) PRO	
Unknown		PRO	Suborbital	Missile test	Unknown	Successful
Unknown	Apogee: 100 kilometres (62 mi)					
Unknown	(Soviet Union) A-350Zh		(Soviet Union) Sary Shagan Site 6		(Soviet Union) PRO	
Unknown		PRO	Suborbital	Missile test	Unknown	Successful
Unknown	Apogee: 100 kilometres (62 mi)					
Unknown	(Soviet Union) MR-12		(Soviet Union) Kapustin Yar		(Soviet Union) AN	
Unknown		AN	Suborbital	Aeronomy	Unknown	Successful
Unknown	Apogee: 150 kilometres (93 mi)					
Unknown	(Soviet Union) MR-12		(Soviet Union) Kapustin Yar		(Soviet Union) AN	
Unknown		AN	Suborbital	Aeronomy	Unknown	Successful
Unknown	Apogee: 150 kilometres (93 mi)					
Unknown	(Soviet Union) MR-12		(Soviet Union) Kapustin Yar		(Soviet Union) AN	
Unknown		AN	Suborbital	Aeronomy	Unknown	Successful
Unknown	Apogee: 150 kilometres (93 mi)					
Unknown	(Soviet Union) MR-12		(Soviet Union) Kapustin Yar		(Soviet Union) AN	
Unknown		AN	Suborbital	Aeronomy	Unknown	Successful
Unknown	Apogee: 150 kilometres (93 mi)					
Unknown	(Soviet Union) RT-1		(Soviet Union) Kapustin Yar		(Soviet Union) RVSN	
Unknown		RVSN	Suborbital	Missile test	Unknown	Successful
Unknown	Apogee: 500 kilometres (310 mi)					
Unknown	(Soviet Union) RT-1		(Soviet Union) Kapustin Yar		(Soviet Union) RVSN	
Unknown		RVSN	Suborbital	Missile test	Unknown	Successful
Unknown	Apogee: 500 kilometres (310 mi)					
Unknown	(France) Berenice		(France) CERES		(France) ONERA	
Unknown		ONERA	Suborbital	REV Test	Unknown	Successful
Unknown	Apogee: 270 kilometres (170 mi)					
Unknown	(France) Berenice		(France) CERES		(France) ONERA	
Unknown		ONERA	Suborbital	REV Test	Unknown	Successful
Unknown	Apogee: 270 kilometres (170 mi)					
Unknown	(United States) Sidewinder-Raven		(United States) White Sands		(United States) ERDL	
Unknown		ERDL	Suborbital	Test flight	Unknown	Successful
Unknown	Apogee: 113 kilometres (70 mi)					
Unknown	(United States) Sidewinder-Raven		(United States) White Sands		(United States) ERDL	
Unknown		ERDL	Suborbital	Test flight	Unknown	Successful
Unknown	Apogee: 113 kilometres (70 mi)					

- ← Jan
- Feb
- Mar
- Apr
- May
- Jun
- Jul
- Aug
- Sep
- Oct
- Nov
- Dec →
