= Kosmos 26 =

Societ magnetic field observation satellite

- Mission type: Magnetosphere
- COSPAR ID: 1964-013A
- SATCAT no.: 00766
- Mission duration: 194 days

Spacecraft properties
- Spacecraft type: DS-MG
- Manufacturer: Yuzhnoye
- Launch mass: 365 kg

Start of mission
- Launch date: 18 March 1964, 15:07:00 GMT
- Rocket: Kosmos-2I 63S1
- Launch site: Kapustin Yar, Mayak-2
- Contractor: Yuzhnoye

End of mission
- Decay date: 28 September 1964

Orbital parameters
- Reference system: Geocentric
- Regime: Low Earth
- Perigee altitude: 266 km
- Apogee altitude: 387 km
- Inclination: 49.0°
- Period: 91.0 minutes
- Epoch: 18 March 1964

Kosmos 26 (Russian: Космос 26 meaning Cosmos 26), also known as DS-MG No.1 was a scientific satellite which was launched by the Soviet Union in 1964. This mission studied the Earth's magnetic field and, along with Kosmos 49, represented the USSR contribution to the International Quiet Solar Year World Magnetic Survey. The corresponding American measurements were performed by the satellites OGO 2 and OGO 4.

It was launched aboard a Kosmos-2I 63S1 rocket from Mayak-2 at Kapustin Yar. The launch occurred at 15:07 GMT on 18 March 1964.

Kosmos 26 was placed into a low Earth orbit with a perigee of 266 kilometres (165 mi), an apogee of 387 kilometres (240 mi), 49.0° of inclination, and an orbital period of 91.0 minutes. It decayed from orbit on 28 September 1964. Kosmos 26 was the first of two DS-MG satellites to be launched, the other being Kosmos 49.

== See also ==
- 1964 in spaceflight
