= Kosmos 49 =

Societ magnetic field observation satellite

- Mission type: Magnetosphere
- COSPAR ID: 1964-069A
- SATCAT no.: 00913
- Mission duration: 301 days

Spacecraft properties
- Spacecraft type: DS-MG
- Manufacturer: Yuzhnoye
- Launch mass: 400 kg

Start of mission
- Launch date: 24 October 1964, 05:17:00 GMT
- Rocket: Kosmos 63S1
- Launch site: Kapustin Yar Mayak-2
- Contractor: Yuzhnoye

End of mission
- Decay date: 21 August 1965

Orbital parameters
- Reference system: Geocentric
- Regime: Low Earth
- Perigee altitude: 264 km
- Apogee altitude: 466 km
- Inclination: 48.99°
- Period: 91.8 minutes
- Epoch: 24 October 1964

Kosmos 49 (Russian: Космос 49 meaning Cosmos 49), also known as DS-MG No.2 was a scientific satellite which was launched by the Soviet Union in 1964. This mission used proton magnetometers to map the Earth's magnetic field and, along with Kosmos 26, represented the USSR's contribution to the International Quiet Solar Year World Magnetic Survey. The corresponding American measurements were performed by the satellites OGO 2 and OGO 4. It also conducted scientific research into the Earth's infrared flux and ultraviolet flux.

The shape of the spacecraft was almost an ellipsoid and measured 1.8 metres (5 ft 11 in) long and 1.2 metres (3 ft 11 in) in diameter. A boom 3.3 metres (11 ft) long was attached at one end of the spacecraft to the magnetometers. It had a mass of 400 kg. The performance of the spacecraft was satisfactory.

It was launched aboard a Kosmos 63S1 rocket from Mayak-2 at Kapustin Yar. The launch occurred at 05:17 GMT on 24 October 1964. Kosmos 49 was placed into a low Earth orbit with a perigee of 264 kilometres (164 mi), an apogee of 466 kilometres (290 mi), 48.99° of inclination, and an orbital period of 91.8 minutes. It decayed from orbit on 21 August 1965. Kosmos 49 was the second of two DS-MG satellites to be launched, the other being Kosmos 26.

== See also ==
- 1964 in spaceflight
