= Elektron (satellite program) =

Series of Soviet satellites

Elektron 1, 2, 3, and 4
- Elektrons 1 and Elektron 2 (identical to 3 and 4)
- Mission type: Earth science
- Operator: Soviet Union
- COSPAR ID: 1964-006A (Elektron 1); 1964-006B (Elektron 2); 1964-038A (Elektron 3); 1964-038B (Elektron 4)

Spacecraft properties
- Manufacturer: OKB-1
- Launch mass: 329 kg (725 lb) (Elektron 1); 444 kg (979 lb) (Elektron 2); 350 kg (770 lb) (Elektron 3); 444 kg (979 lb) (Elektron 4)

Start of mission
- Launch date: Elektron 1 and 2: January 30, 1964, 09:45 UTC; Elektron 3 and 4: July 11, 1964, 21:51 UTC
- Rocket: Vostok 8K72K
- Launch site: Baikonur LC1

Orbital parameters
- Reference system: Geocentric
- Perigee altitude: Elektron 1: 406 kilometres (252 mi); Elektron 2: 460 kilometres (290 mi); Elektron 3: 408 kilometres (254 mi); Elektron 4: 459 kilometres (285 mi)
- Apogee altitude: Elektron 1: 7,110 kilometres (4,420 mi); Elektron 2: 68,000 kilometres (42,000 mi); Elektron 3: 7,030 kilometres (4,370 mi); Elektron 4: 66,100 kilometres (41,100 mi)
- Inclination: 61 degrees
- Period: 168.9 minutes (1/3); 22.5 hours (2/4)

Elektron (Russian: электрон, 'electron'), in American sources sometimes called Electron, was the first Soviet multiple satellite program, comprising two identical pairs of particle physics satellites launched by the Soviet Union in 1964. The four spacecraft simultaneously monitored the lower and upper Van Allen radiation belts and returned a considerable volume of data regarding radiation in space and atmospheric conditions to an altitude of more than 58,000 kilometres (36,000 mi) above the Earth. Two of the four launched satellites are still in orbit as of 2023, the other two having reentered.

== History ==
On 23 June 1960, Soviet spaceflight engineer Sergei Korolev's "big space plan" for the future of Soviet space endeavors was approved by the Central Committee of the Communist Party and the Council of Soviet Ministers. The plan included provisions for the development of scientific spacecraft to map Earth's Van Allen radiation belts.

Per decrees on 9 May 1960 and 13 May 1961, the satellites would consist of two identical pairs of spacecraft, the satellites of each pair in differing orbits to map the lower and upper Van Allen Belts simultaneously. The satellites would orbit at higher orbital inclinations than those launched by the United States (at an angle of 60 degrees vs. 30 degrees with respect to Earth's equator). Each pair would be deployed by a single Vostok rocket. Korolev's design bureau, OKB-1, began design work in July. In addition to investigating Earth's natural radiation belts, they were designed to study artificial radiation belts created by high altitude nuclear tests. However, the ratification of the Partial Nuclear Test Ban Treaty in August 1963 ended such tests before the launch of the Elektron satellites.

== Spacecraft design ==
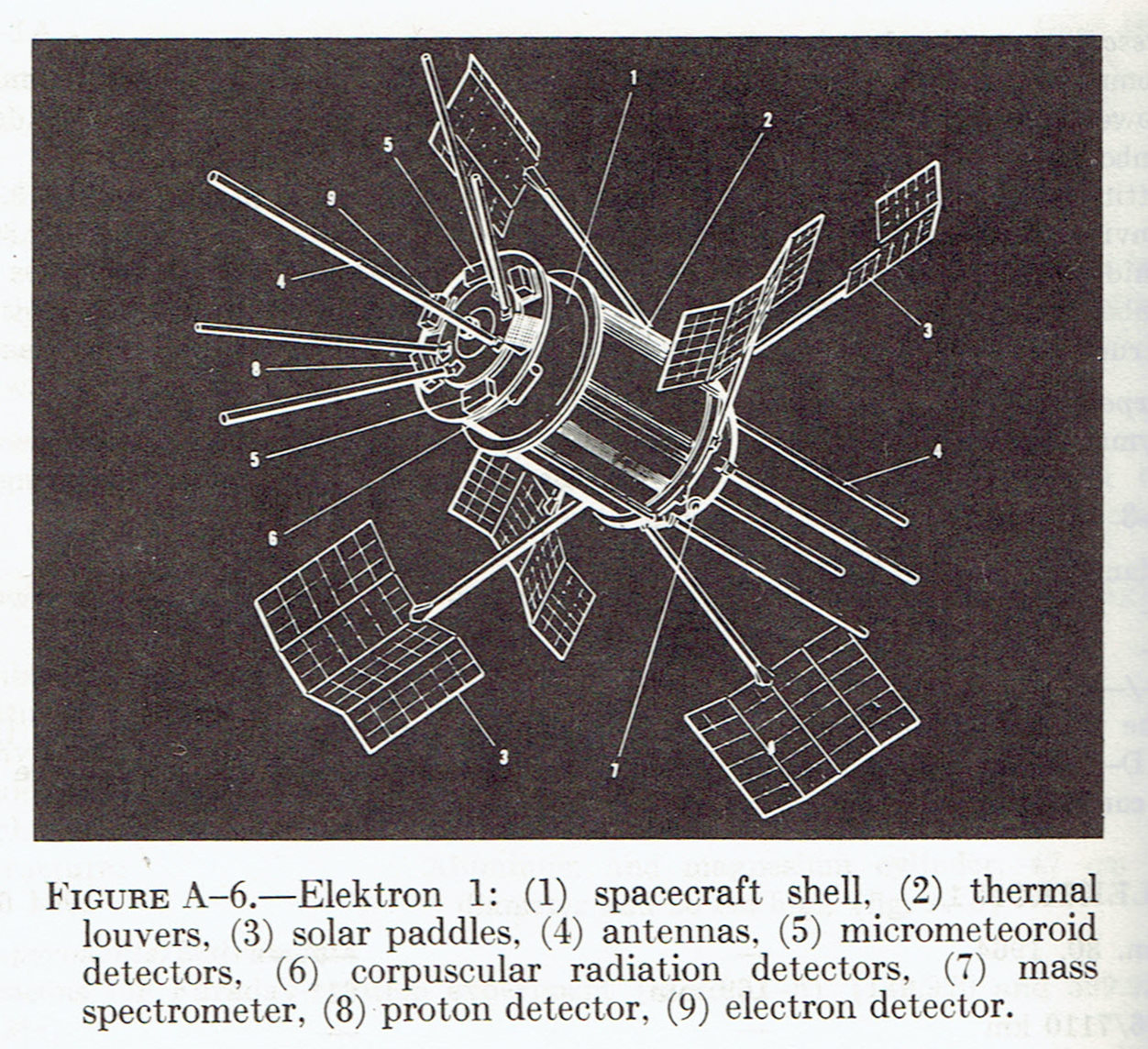
Diagram of Elektrons 1 and 3

=== Elektron 1 and 3 ===
Elektron 1 and 3 had design masses of 350 kg (770 lb), were 3.25 metres (10.7 ft) in diameter, and were designed to be placed into eccentric 425 kilometres (264 mi) × 6,000 kilometres (3,700 mi) orbits. They were cylindrical with six solar panels with a combined area of 20 m^{2} for power generation.

The experiment packages for Elektron 1 and 3 were identical, each including a radio frequency mass spectrometer; Geiger counters, scintillation counters, and semiconductor detectors for radiation studies; a piezoelectric micrometeoroid detector; a galactic radio-noise receiver, and a radio beacon for ionospheric studies. Telemetry and commands were conveyed via four antennas. The internal environment of the satellites was kept moderated through thermal louvers.

Elektron 1 ultimately had a mass of 329 kg (725 lb) while Elektron 3 had a mass of 350 kg (770 lb).

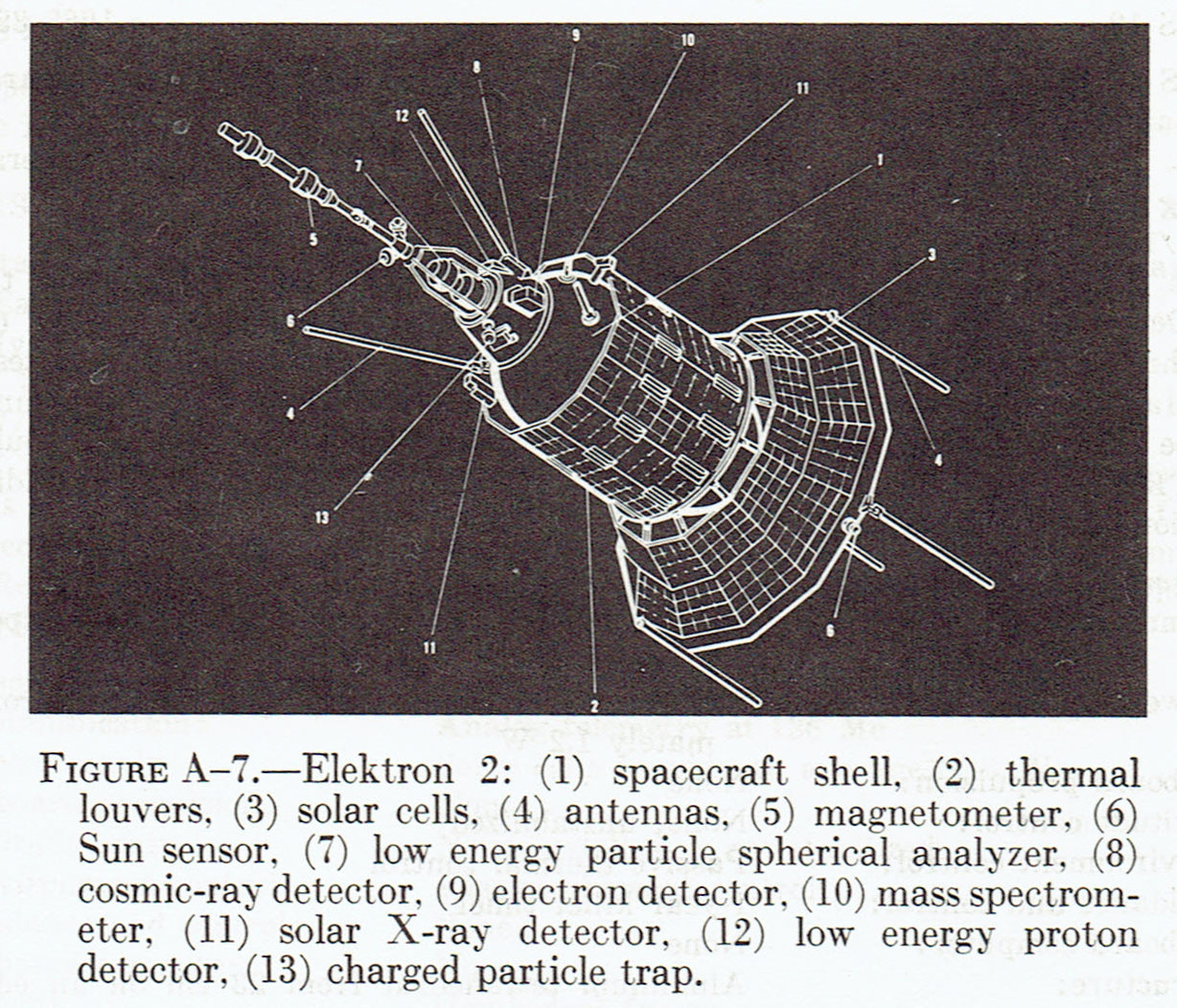
Diagram of Elektrons 2 and 4

=== Elektron 2 and 4 ===
Elektron 2 and 4 had design masses of 460 kg (1,010 lb), were 4 metres (13 ft) in diameter and 8.5 metres (28 ft) long, also cylindrical, but with a skirt of solar cells with a combined area of 20 m^{2} for power generation rather than solar panels. The satellites were to be boosted into highly eccentric 450 kilometres (280 mi) × 60,000 kilometres (37,000 mi) orbits to map the outer Van Allen belt while, simultaneously, Elektron 1 and 3 probed the inner radiation belt. To achieve this orbit, Elektron 2 and 4 were each equipped with solid-propellant perigee kick motor of 3,350 kgf and 12 to 15 seconds duration.

The experiment packages for Elektron 2 and 4 were also identical, and each included a radio frequency mass spectrometer; Geiger counters, scintillation counters, and semiconductor detectors for radiation studies; a spherical ion trap; two three-axis fluxgate magnetometers; a galactic radio-noise receiver; solar X-ray photometers; and a Cerenkov-scintillator cosmic-ray telescope. Telemetry and commands were conveyed via four antennas. The internal environment of the satellites was kept moderated through thermal louvers, and the satellite stabilized with the aid of a Sun sensor.

== Missions ==
The orbits of satellites Elektron 2 and 4 with respect to the Earth's magnetosphere (adapted from 1969 paper)

=== Mission 1 ===
Elektrons 1 and 2 were launched on January 30, 1964, at 09:45:09 UTC from Launch Complex 1 at Baikonur Space Center (also known as NIIP-5) on a single Vostok 8K72K carrier rocket marking the first Soviet multiple satellite launch. The satellites, although launched from Earth together, were released at different stages, and so were able to achieve different orbits. The first satellite was released at a time when the upper stage of the launching rocket was still firing. Elektron 1's initial orbit had a perigee of 406 kilometres (252 mi), an apogee of 7,110 kilometres (4,420 mi), an orbital inclination of 61°, and a period of 169 minutes, an orbit that kept the satellite within Earth's Van Allen Belts.

Elektron 2's orbit took the spacecraft beyond the Earth's magnetosphere to penetrate the shock wave and turbulent area marking the Earth's magnetopause: its initial perigee was 460 kilometres (290 mi), the apogee was 68,000 kilometres (42,000 mi), its orbital inclination was 61°, and its period 1,360 minutes.

Elektron 1 returned usable data as late as October 1964; Elektron 2 as late as May 1964.

=== Mission 2 ===
Elektron 3 and 4 were launched on July 11, 1964, at 21:51:02 UTC from Launch Complex 1 at Baikonur Space Center, again on a single Vostok 8K72K, with identical missions and similar orbits to that of Elektron 1 and 2. Elektron 3's orbit had a perigee of 408 kilometres (254 mi), an apogee of 7,030 kilometres (4,370 mi), an orbital inclination of 61°, and a period of 168 minutes; Elektron 4's orbit had a perigee of 459 kilometres (285 mi), an apogee of 66,100 kilometres (41,100 mi), an orbital inclination of 61°, and a period of 1,314 minutes.

Elektron 3 returned usable data as late as October 1964; Elektron 4 as late as November 1964.

== Legacy and status ==
The Elektron satellites returned data that supported more than a dozen technical papers on a variety of subjects including near-Earth magnetic fields, particle distribution, and ionospheric studies, and allowed the assessment of risk to both cosmonauts and satellites from radiation in outer space. The Elektron satellites returned considerable measurements on the make-up of Earth's atmosphere to an altitude of 3,000 kilometres (1,900 mi), including the concentration of hydrogen, carbon, and oxygen ions. These satellites, along with the concurrent Kosmos satellite program, contributed to Soviet prestige, bolstering the impression that the Soviets, like the Americans, were committed to civilian as well as military application of satellites.

In July 1965, Elektron 1 and 2 were displayed among the new exhibits at Kosmos Pavilion in the Soviet exposition on achievements of U.S.S.R's national economy.

Elektron 4 decayed from its orbit on 12 October 1983, and Elektron 2 decayed from its orbit on 20 July 1997. Elektron 1 and 3 remain in orbit As of 2023.

== See also ==
- Soviet space program
