= Sidewinder Raven =

Sidewinder Raven is the designation of a two-stage sounding rocket. It has a ceiling of 112 km, a takeoff thrust of 26 kN, a takeoff weight of 110 kg, a diameter of 130 mm and a length of 5.20 m.
