= 1964 in spaceflight (July–September) =

This is a list of spaceflights launched between July and September 1964. For launches in the rest of the year, see 1964 in spaceflight (January–March), 1964 in spaceflight (April–June) and 1964 in spaceflight (October–December). For an overview of the whole year, see 1964 in spaceflight.

== Orbital launches ==
- ← Jan
- Feb
- Mar
- Apr
- May
- Jun
- Jul
- Aug
- Sep
- Oct
- Nov
- Dec →

| Date and time (UTC) | Rocket | Flight number | Launch site | | LSP | |
| Date and time (UTC) | Payload (⚀ = CubeSat) | Operator | Orbit | Function | Decay (UTC) | Outcome |
| Date and time (UTC) | Remarks | | | | | |
|---|---|---|---|---|---|---|
=== July ===
| 1 July; 11:16 | (Soviet Union) Voskhod | | (Soviet Union) Baikonur Site 1/5 | | (Soviet Union) | |
| 1 July; 11:16 | (Soviet Union) Kosmos 34 (Zenit-4 №3) | | Low Earth | Optical imaging | 9 July | Successful |
| 2 July; 23:59:56 | (United States) Thrust Augmented Thor SLV-2A Agena-D | | (United States) Vandenberg LC-75-3-5 | | (United States) US Air Force | |
| 2 July; 23:59:56 | (United States) OPS 3395 (Ferret 6/Samos-F3 2) | US Air Force/NRO | Low Earth | ELINT | 7 August 1969 | Successful |
| 6 July; 18:51:18 | (United States) Atlas LV-3A Agena-D | | (United States) Point Arguello LC-2-3 | | (United States) US Air Force | |
| 6 July; 18:51:18 | (United States) OPS 3684 (KH-7 9/4009/AFP-206 SV-959) | US Air Force/NRO | Low Earth | Optical imaging | 8 July | Successful |
| 6 July; 18:51:18 | (United States) OPS 4923 (SSF-A 3/EHH A3) | US Air Force/NRO | Low Earth | SIGINT | 3 January 1965 | Successful |
| 10 July; 21:51:02 | (Soviet Union) Vostok-K | | (Soviet Union) Baikonur Site 1/5 | | (Soviet Union) | |
| 10 July; 21:51:02 | (Soviet Union) Elektron 3 | | Medium Earth | Radiation | In orbit | Successful |
| 10 July; 21:51:02 | (Soviet Union) Elektron 4 | | Highly elliptical | Radiation | 12 October 1983 | Successful |
| 10 July; 21:51:02 | Final flight of Vostok-K. | | | | | |
| 10 July; 23:15 | (United States) Thrust Augmented Thor SLV-2A Agena-D | | (United States) Point Arguello LC-1-1 | | (United States) US Air Force | |
| 10 July; 23:15 | (United States) OPS 3491 (KH-4A 8/1008) | US Air Force/NRO | Low Earth | Optical imaging | 6 August | Successful |
| 10 July; 23:15 | (United States) SRV 640 | US Air Force/NRO | Low Earth | Film return | July | Successful |
| 10 July; 23:15 | (United States) SRV 641 | US Air Force/NRO | Low Earth | Film return | July | Successful |
| 10 July; 23:15 | Last launch from Point Arguello. | | | | | |
| 15 July; 11:31 | (Soviet Union) Vostok-2 | | (Soviet Union) Baikonur Site 31/6 | | (Soviet Union) | |
| 15 July; 11:31 | (Soviet Union) Kosmos 35 (Zenit-2 №21) | | Low Earth | Optical imaging | 23 July | Successful |
| 17 July; 08:22 | (United States) Atlas LV-3A Agena-D | | (United States) Cape Canaveral LC-13 | | (United States) US Air Force | |
| 17 July; 08:22 | (United States) OPS 3662 (Vela 2A) | US Air Force | High Earth | Nuclear test detection Radiation research | In orbit | Successful |
| 17 July; 08:22 | (United States) OPS 3674 (Vela 2B) | US Air Force | High Earth | Nuclear test detection Radiation research | In orbit | Successful |
| 17 July; 08:22 | (United States) ERS-13 | US Air Force | Highly elliptical | Particle research | 5 February 1966 | Successful |
| 28 July; 16:50:07 | (United States) Atlas LV-3A Agena-B | | (United States) Cape Canaveral LC-12 | | (United States) US Air Force | |
| 28 July; 16:50:07 | (United States) Ranger 7 | NASA | Highly elliptical | Lunar impactor | 31 July; 13:25:48 | Successful |
| 28 July; 16:50:07 | Impacted Mare Nubium. | | | | | |
| 30 July; 03:36 | (Soviet Union) Kosmos 63S1 | | (Soviet Union) Kapustin Yar Mayak-2 | | (Soviet Union) | |
| 30 July; 03:36 | (Soviet Union) Kosmos 36 (DS-P1-Yu №1) | | Low Earth | Radar target | 28 February 1965 | Successful |
← Jan; Feb; Mar; Apr; May; Jun; Jul; Aug; Sep; Oct; Nov; Dec →; === August ===
| 5 August; 23:15:35 | (United States) Thrust Augmented Thor SLV-2A Agena-D | | (United States) Vandenberg LC-75-3-4 | | (United States) US Air Force | |
| 5 August; 23:15:35 | (United States) OPS 3042 (KH-4A 9/1009) | US Air Force/NRO | Low Earth | Optical imaging | 1 September | Successful |
| 5 August; 23:15:35 | (United States) SRV 646 | US Air Force/NRO | Low Earth | Film return | August | Successful |
| 5 August; 23:15:35 | (United States) SRV 647 | US Air Force/NRO | Low Earth | Film return | August | Successful |
| 14 August; 09:36 | (Soviet Union) Vostok-2 | | (Soviet Union) Baikonur Site 31/6 | | (Soviet Union) | |
| 14 August; 09:36 | (Soviet Union) Kosmos 37 (Zenit-2 №22) | | Low Earth | Optical imaging | 22 August | Partial spacecraft failure |
| 14 August; 09:36 | Film in SA-10 camera broke. | | | | | |
| 14 August; 22:00:13 | (United States) Atlas SLV-3 Agena-D | | (United States) Vandenberg PALC-2-4 | | (United States) US Air Force | |
| 14 August; 22:00:13 | (United States) OPS 3802 (KH-7 10/4010/AFP-206 SV-960) | US Air Force/NRO | Low Earth | Optical imaging | 23 August | Successful |
| 14 August; 22:00:13 | (United States) OPS 3216 (Hitchhiker 2/P-11 4202) | US Air Force/NRO | Low Earth | SIGINT | 8 March 1979 | Successful |
| 14 August; 22:00:13 | Maiden flight of Atlas SLV-3 Agena-D, first Atlas-Agena launch from Vandenberg. | | | | | |
| 18 August; 09:15 | (Soviet Union) Kosmos-1 | | (Soviet Union) Baikonur Site 41/15 | | (Soviet Union) | |
| 18 August; 09:15 | (Soviet Union) Kosmos 38 (Strela-1 №1) | | Low Earth | Communications; Technology | 8 November | Successful |
| 18 August; 09:15 | (Soviet Union) Kosmos 39 (Strela-1 №2) | | Low Earth | Communications; Technology | 17 November | Successful |
| 18 August; 09:15 | (Soviet Union) Kosmos 40 (Strela-1 №3) | | Low Earth | Communications; Technology | 18 November | Successful |
| 18 August; 09:15 | Maiden flight of Kosmos-1. | | | | | |
| 19 August; 12:15:02 | (United States) Delta D | | (United States) Cape Canaveral LC-17A | | (United States) US Air Force | |
| 19 August; 12:15:02 | (United States) Syncom 3 (Syncom C) | NASA | Geosynchronous | Communications | In orbit | Successful |
| 19 August; 12:15:02 | Maiden flight of Delta D, satellite positioned at 64° West and 180° East in 1964, moved to 25° West in 1965, and 165° East in 1966. | | | | | |
| 21 August; 15:45 | (United States) Thrust Augmented Thor SLV-2A Agena-D | | (United States) Vandenberg LC-75-1-2 | | (United States) US Air Force | |
| 21 August; 15:45 | (United States) OPS 2739 (KH-5 12/9064A) | US Air Force/NRO | Low Earth | Optical imaging | 31 March 1965 | Partial spacecraft failure |
| 21 August; 15:45 | (United States) SRV 667 | US Air Force/NRO | Low Earth | Film return | August | Successful |
| 21 August; 15:45 | Final KH-5 flight, film affected by image smearing and a flare, carried Starflash 1B experiment. | | | | | |
| 22 August; 07:12 | (Soviet Union) Molniya | | (Soviet Union) Baikonur Site 1/5 | | (Soviet Union) | |
| 22 August; 07:12 | (Soviet Union) Kosmos 41 (Molniya-1) | | Molniya | Communications; Technology | 9 April 2004 | Spacecraft failure |
| 22 August; 07:12 | Communications antenna failed to deploy. | | | | | |
| 22 August; 11:02 | (Soviet Union) Kosmos 63S1 | | (Soviet Union) Kapustin Yar Mayak-2 | | (Soviet Union) | |
| 22 August; 11:02 | (Soviet Union) Kosmos 42 (Strela-1 №4) | | Low Earth | Communications; Technology | 19 December 1965 | Successful |
| 22 August; 11:02 | (Soviet Union) Kosmos 43 (Strela-1 №5) | | Low Earth | Communications; Technology | 27 December 1965 | Successful |
| 25 August; 13:43 | (United States) Scout X-4 | | (United States) Vandenberg PALC-D | | (United States) US Air Force | |
| 25 August; 13:43 | (United States) Explorer 20 (IE-A/TOPSI/S-48) | NASA | Low Earth | Ionospheric | In orbit | Successful |
| 28 August; 07:56:57 | (United States) Thor SLV-2 Agena-B | | (United States) Vandenberg LC-75-1-1 | | (United States) US Air Force | |
| 28 August; 07:56:57 | (United States) Nimbus 1 (Nimbus A) | NASA | Low Earth | Weather; Technology | 16 May 1974 | Partial launch failure |
| 28 August; 07:56:57 | Placed in lower than planned orbit due to premature second stage cutoff during second burn. | | | | | |
| 28 August; 16:19 | (Soviet Union) Vostok-2M | | (Soviet Union) Baikonur Site 31/6 | | (Soviet Union) RVSN | |
| 28 August; 16:19 | (Soviet Union) Kosmos 44 (Meteor №1) | VNIEM | Low Earth | Weather | In orbit | Successful |
| 28 August; 16:19 | Maiden flight of Vostok-2M. | | | | | |
← Jan; Feb; Mar; Apr; May; Jun; Jul; Aug; Sep; Oct; Nov; Dec →; === September ===
| 1 September; 15:00:06 | (United States) Titan IIIA | 3A-2 | (United States) Cape Canaveral LC-20 | | (United States) US Air Force | |
| 1 September; 15:00:06 | (United States) Transtage 1 | US Air Force | Intended: Low Earth | Test flight | 1 September | Launch failure |
| 1 September; 15:00:06 | Maiden flight of Titan IIIA, upper stage pressurisation system failed. | | | | | |
| 5 September; 01:23 | (United States) Atlas LV-3A Agena-B | | (United States) Cape Canaveral LC-12 | | (United States) U.S Air Force | |
| 5 September; 01:23 | (United States) OGO-1 (OGO-A) | NASA | Highly elliptical | Magnetospheric research | 29 August 2020; 20:44 | Partial spacecraft failure; Successful |
| 5 September; 01:23 | Two booms failed to deploy; one blocked a horizon sensor, disabling attitude control system. OGO-1 was put in stand-by mode on 25 November 1969, and the mission was officially terminated on 1 November 1971. | | | | | |
| 13 September; 09:50 | (Soviet Union) Voskhod | | (Soviet Union) Baikonur Site 1/5 | | (Soviet Union) RVSN | |
| 13 September; 09:50 | (Soviet Union) Kosmos 45 (Zenit-4 №4) | | Low Earth | Optical imaging | 18 September | Successful |
| 14 September; 22:53 | (United States) Thrust Augmented Thor SLV-2A Agena-D | | (United States) Vandenberg PALC-1-1 | | (United States) US Air Force | |
| 14 September; 22:53 | (United States) OPS 3497 (KH-4A 10/1010) | US Air Force/NRO | Low Earth | Optical imaging | 6 October | Successful |
| 14 September; 22:53 | (United States) SRV 644 | US Air Force/NRO | Low Earth | Film return | September | Successful |
| 14 September; 22:53 | (United States) SRV 652 | US Air Force/NRO | Low Earth | Film return | September | Successful |
| 18 September; 16:22:43 | (United States) Saturn I | | (United States) Cape Canaveral LC-37B | | (United States) NASA | |
| 18 September; 16:22:43 | (United States) Apollo A-102 (BP-15) | NASA | Low Earth | Test flight | 22 September; 07:20 | Successful |
| 18 September; 16:22:43 | Boilerplate Apollo spacecraft | | | | | |
| 23 September; 22:06 | (United States) Atlas SLV-3 Agena-D | | (United States) Vandenberg PALC-2-4 | | (United States) US Air Force | |
| 23 September; 22:06 | (United States) OPS 4262 (KH-7 11/4011/AFP-206 SV-962) | US Air Force/NRO | Low Earth | Optical imaging | 28 September | Successful |
| 24 September; 12:00 | (Soviet Union) Vostok-2 | | (Soviet Union) Baikonur Site 31/6 | | (Soviet Union) RVSN | |
| 24 September; 12:00 | (Soviet Union) Kosmos 46 (Zenit-2 №22) | | Low Earth | Optical imaging | 2 October | Successful |
← Jan; Feb; Mar; Apr; May; Jun; Jul; Aug; Sep; Oct; Nov; Dec →
For flights after 30 September, see 1964 in spaceflight (October-December)

== Suborbital launches ==
- ← Jan
- Feb
- Mar
- Apr
- May
- Jun
- Jul
- Aug
- Sep
- Oct
- Nov
- Dec →

| Date and time (UTC) | Rocket | Flight number | Launch site | | LSP | |
| Date and time (UTC) | Payload (⚀ = CubeSat) | Operator | Orbit | Function | Decay (UTC) | Outcome |
| Date and time (UTC) | Remarks | | | | | |
|---|---|---|---|---|---|---|
=== July ===
| 1 July | (Soviet Union) R-12 Dvina | | (Soviet Union) Kapustin Yar | | (Soviet Union) MVS | |
| 1 July | | MVS | Suborbital | Missile test | 1 July | Successful |
| 1 July | Apogee: 402 kilometres (250 mi) | | | | | |
| 1 July | (Soviet Union) R-16U | | (Soviet Union) Baikonur Site 41/4 | | (Soviet Union) RVSN | |
| 1 July | | RVSN | Suborbital | Missile test | 1 July | Successful |
| 1 July | Apogee: 1,210 kilometres (750 mi) | | | | | |
| 2 July; 00:24:03 | (United States) UGM-27 Polaris A3 | | (United States) Cape Canaveral LC-25A | | (United States) US Navy | |
| 2 July; 00:24:03 | | US Navy | Suborbital | Missile test | 2 July | Successful |
| 2 July; 00:24:03 | Apogee: 1,000 kilometres (620 mi) | | | | | |
| 2 July; 21:00 | (Canada) Black Brant IVA | | (Canada) Churchill | | (Canada) CARDE | |
| 2 July; 21:00 | | CBAL | Suborbital | Test flight | 2 July | Launch failure |
| 2 July; 21:00 | Apogee: 400 kilometres (250 mi) | | | | | |
| 2 July | (United States) Nike-Tomahawk | | (United States) Barking Sands | | (United States) Sandia | |
| 2 July | | Sandia | Suborbital | Aeronomy | 2 July | Successful |
| 2 July | Apogee: 298 kilometres (185 mi) | | | | | |
| 2 July | (Soviet Union) R-12 Dvina | | (Soviet Union) Kapustin Yar | | (Soviet Union) MVS | |
| 2 July | | MVS | Suborbital | Missile test | 2 July | Successful |
| 2 July | Apogee: 402 kilometres (250 mi) | | | | | |
| 5 July | (United States) Nike-Apache | | (United States) White Sands | | (United States) US Air Force | |
| 5 July | | AFCRL | Suborbital | Aeronomy | 5 July | |
| 5 July | Apogee: 200 kilometres (120 mi) | | | | | |
| 6 July; 19:23 | (United Kingdom) Skylark-7C | | (Italy) Salto di Quirra | | (Europe) ESRO | |
| 6 July; 19:23 | | CNES/Liège | Suborbital | Aeronomy | 6 July | Successful |
| 6 July; 19:23 | Apogee: 198 kilometres (123 mi) | | | | | |
| 6 July | (United States) Nike-Tomahawk | | (United States) Barking Sands | | (United States) Sandia | |
| 6 July | | Sandia | Suborbital | Solar | 6 July | Successful |
| 6 July | Apogee: 288 kilometres (179 mi) | | | | | |
| 7 July; 19:00 | (United States) LGM-30B Minuteman IB | | (United States) Vandenberg LF-02 | | (United States) Strategic Air Command | |
| 7 July; 19:00 | | Strategic Air Command | Suborbital | Missile test | 7 July | Successful |
| 7 July; 19:00 | Apogee: 1,300 kilometres (810 mi) | | | | | |
| 7 July; 19:30 | (United States) LGM-30A Minuteman IA | | (United States) Vandenberg LF-05 | | (United States) Strategic Air Command | |
| 7 July; 19:30 | | Strategic Air Command | Suborbital | Missile test | 7 July | Launch failure |
| 7 July; 19:30 | Apogee: 10 kilometres (6.2 mi) | | | | | |
| 7 July; 22:43 | (United States) Aerobee-150 (Hi) | | (United States) White Sands | | (United States) NRL | |
| 7 July; 22:43 | | NRL | Suborbital | XR astronomy | 7 July | Successful |
| 7 July; 22:43 | Apogee: 295 kilometres (183 mi) | | | | | |
| 7 July; 23:02 | (Canada) Martlet 2 | | Barbados | | (Canada) (United States) DND/DoD | |
| 7 July; 23:02 | | DND/DoD | Suborbital | Aeronomy | 7 July | Successful |
| 7 July; 23:02 | Apogee: 109 kilometres (68 mi) | | | | | |
| 7 July | (Soviet Union) R-12 Dvina | | (Soviet Union) Kapustin Yar | | (Soviet Union) MVS | |
| 7 July | | MVS | Suborbital | Missile test | 7 July | Successful |
| 7 July | Apogee: 402 kilometres (250 mi) | | | | | |
| 8 July; 19:15:03 | (United States) UGM-27 Polaris A2 | | (United States) USS John Adams (SSBN-620), ETR | | (United States) US Navy | |
| 8 July; 19:15:03 | | US Navy | Suborbital | Missile test | 8 July | Successful |
| 8 July; 19:15:03 | Apogee: 1,000 kilometres (620 mi) | | | | | |
| 8 July; 19:22 | (United Kingdom) Skylark-7C | | (Italy) Salto di Quirra | | (Europe) ESRO | |
| 8 July; 19:22 | | CNES/Liège | Suborbital | Aeronomy | 8 July | Successful |
| 8 July; 19:22 | Apogee: 183 kilometres (114 mi) | | | | | |
| 8 July; 20:15:03 | (United States) UGM-27 Polaris A2 | | (United States) USS John Adams, ETR | | (United States) US Navy | |
| 8 July; 20:15:03 | | US Navy | Suborbital | Missile test | 8 July | Successful |
| 8 July; 20:15:03 | Apogee: 1,000 kilometres (620 mi) | | | | | |
| 8 July; 21:16:02 | (United States) UGM-27 Polaris A2 | | (United States) USS John Adams, ETR | | (United States) US Navy | |
| 8 July; 21:16:02 | | US Navy | Suborbital | Missile test | 8 July | Successful |
| 8 July; 21:16:02 | Apogee: 1,000 kilometres (620 mi) | | | | | |
| 8 July; 21:23 | (United States) Athena RTV | | (United States) Green River Pad 1 | | (United States) US Air Force | |
| 8 July; 21:23 | | US Air Force | Suborbital | REV Test | 8 July | Successful |
| 8 July; 21:23 | Apogee: 260 kilometres (160 mi) | | | | | |
| 8 July | (United States) Terrier-Tomahawk | | (United States) Barking Sands | | (United States) Sandia | |
| 8 July | | Sandia | Suborbital | Aeronomy | 8 July | Launch failure |
| 8 July | Apogee: 1 kilometre (0.62 mi) | | | | | |
| 8 July | (Soviet Union) R-12 Dvina | | (Soviet Union) Kapustin Yar | | (Soviet Union) MVS | |
| 8 July | | MVS | Suborbital | Missile test | 8 July | Successful |
| 8 July | Apogee: 402 kilometres (250 mi) | | | | | |
| 9 July; 04:13 | (United States) Nike-Apache | | (United States) Wallops Island | | (United States) NASA | |
| 9 July; 04:13 | | Rice | Suborbital | Aeronomy | 9 July | Successful |
| 9 July; 04:13 | Apogee: 167 kilometres (104 mi) | | | | | |
| 9 July; 08:39 | (United States) HAD | | (Australia) Woomera LA-2 | | (Australia) WRE | |
| 9 July; 08:39 | | WRE | Suborbital | Aeronomy | 9 July | Successful |
| 9 July; 08:39 | Apogee: 111 kilometres (69 mi) | | | | | |
| 9 July; 19:00 | (United States) LGM-30B Minuteman IB | | (United States) Vandenberg LF-07 | | (United States) Strategic Air Command | |
| 9 July; 19:00 | | Strategic Air Command | Suborbital | Missile test | 9 July | Successful |
| 9 July; 19:00 | Apogee: 1,300 kilometres (810 mi) | | | | | |
| 9 July | (China) Dongfeng 2 | | (China) Jiuquan LA-3 | | (China) PLA | |
| 9 July | | PLA | Suborbital | Missile test | 9 July | Successful |
| 9 July | Apogee: 200 kilometres (120 mi) | | | | | |
| 10 July | (Soviet Union) R-12 Dvina | | (Soviet Union) Kapustin Yar | | (Soviet Union) MVS | |
| 10 July | | MVS | Suborbital | Missile test | 10 July | Successful |
| 10 July | Apogee: 402 kilometres (250 mi) | | | | | |
| 11 July; 02:02 | (Japan) Lambda 3 | | (Japan) Kagoshima LA-L | | (Japan) ISAS | |
| 11 July; 02:02 | | Tokai | Suborbital | Ionospheric | 11 July | Successful |
| 11 July; 02:02 | Apogee: 857 kilometres (533 mi) | | | | | |
| 11 July | (China) Dongfeng 2 | | (China) Jiuquan LA-3 | | (China) PLA | |
| 11 July | | PLA | Suborbital | Missile test | 11 July | Successful |
| 11 July | Apogee: 200 kilometres (120 mi) | | | | | |
| 13 July; 03:04 | (United States) HAD | | (Australia) Woomera LA-2 | | (Australia) WRE | |
| 13 July; 03:04 | | WRE | Suborbital | Aeronomy | 13 July | Successful |
| 13 July; 03:04 | Apogee: 122 kilometres (76 mi) | | | | | |
| 13 July | (United States) LGM-30B Minuteman IB | | (United States) Vandenberg LF-03 | | (United States) Strategic Air Command | |
| 13 July | | Strategic Air Command | Suborbital | Missile test | 13 July | Successful |
| 13 July | Apogee: 1,300 kilometres (810 mi) | | | | | |
| 14 July; 03:00 | (United States) HAD | | (Australia) Woomera LA-2 | | (Australia) WRE | |
| 14 July; 03:00 | | WRE | Suborbital | Aeronomy | 14 July | Successful |
| 14 July; 03:00 | Apogee: 122 kilometres (76 mi) | | | | | |
| 14 July | (Soviet Union) R-12 Dvina | | (Soviet Union) Kapustin Yar | | (Soviet Union) MVS | |
| 14 July | | MVS | Suborbital | Missile test | 14 July | Successful |
| 14 July | Apogee: 402 kilometres (250 mi) | | | | | |
| 15 July; 00:58 | (United States) Nike-Apache | | (United States) Wallops Island | | (United States) NASA | |
| 15 July; 00:58 | | GCA | Suborbital | Aeronomy | 15 July | Successful |
| 15 July; 00:58 | Apogee: 191 kilometres (119 mi) | | | | | |
| 15 July; 02:19 | (United States) HAD | | (Australia) Woomera LA-2 | | (Australia) WRE | |
| 15 July; 02:19 | | WRE | Suborbital | Aeronomy | 15 July | Successful |
| 15 July; 02:19 | Apogee: 106 kilometres (66 mi) | | | | | |
| 15 July; 04:09 | (United States) Nike-Apache | | (United States) Wallops Island | | (United States) NASA | |
| 15 July; 04:09 | | GCA | Suborbital | Aeronomy | 15 July | Successful |
| 15 July; 04:09 | Apogee: 192 kilometres (119 mi) | | | | | |
| 15 July; 08:00 | (United States) Nike-Apache | | (United States) Wallops Island | | (United States) NASA | |
| 15 July; 08:00 | | Urbana-Champaign | Suborbital | Ionospheric | 15 July | Successful |
| 15 July; 08:00 | Apogee: 154 kilometres (96 mi) | | | | | |
| 15 July; 08:05 | (United States) Nike-Apache | | (United States) Wallops Island | | (United States) NASA | |
| 15 July; 08:05 | | GCA | Suborbital | Aeronomy | 15 July | Successful |
| 15 July; 08:05 | Apogee: 190 kilometres (120 mi) | | | | | |
| 15 July; 09:06 | (United States) Nike-Apache | | (United States) Wallops Island | | (United States) NASA | |
| 15 July; 09:06 | | GCA | Suborbital | Aeronomy | 15 July | Successful |
| 15 July; 09:06 | Apogee: 191 kilometres (119 mi) | | | | | |
| 15 July; 09:20 | (United States) Nike-Apache | | (United States) Wallops Island | | (United States) NASA | |
| 15 July; 09:20 | | Urbana-Champaign | Suborbital | Ionospheric | 15 July | Successful |
| 15 July; 09:20 | Apogee: 161 kilometres (100 mi) | | | | | |
| 15 July; 10:25 | (United States) Nike-Apache | | (United States) Wallops Island | | (United States) NASA | |
| 15 July; 10:25 | | Urbana-Champaign | Suborbital | Ionospheric | 15 July | Successful |
| 15 July; 10:25 | Apogee: 171 kilometres (106 mi) | | | | | |
| 15 July; 17:30 | (United States) Nike-Tomahawk | | (United States) Barking Sands | | (United States) Sandia | |
| 15 July; 17:30 | | NASA | Suborbital | Technology | 15 July | Successful |
| 15 July; 17:30 | Apogee: 270 kilometres (170 mi) | | | | | |
| 16 July; 02:13 | (United States) HAD | | (Australia) Woomera LA-2 | | (Australia) WRE | |
| 16 July; 02:13 | | WRE | Suborbital | Aeronomy | 16 July | Successful |
| 16 July; 02:13 | Apogee: 106 kilometres (66 mi) | | | | | |
| 16 July; 05:30 | (United States) HAD | | (Australia) Carnarvon | | (Australia) WRE | |
| 16 July; 05:30 | | WRE | Suborbital | Aeronomy | 16 July | Successful |
| 16 July; 05:30 | Apogee: 114 kilometres (71 mi) | | | | | |
| 16 July; 16:22 | (United States) Nike-Apache | | (United States) Wallops Island | | (United States) NASA | |
| 16 July; 16:22 | | NASA | Suborbital | Ionospheric | 16 July | Successful |
| 16 July; 16:22 | Apogee: 137 kilometres (85 mi) | | | | | |
| 16 July; 16:54:04 | (United States) UGM-27 Polaris A3 | | (United States) USS Daniel Boone, ETR | | (United States) US Navy | |
| 16 July; 16:54:04 | | US Navy | Suborbital | Missile test | 16 July | Successful |
| 16 July; 16:54:04 | Apogee: 1,000 kilometres (620 mi) | | | | | |
| 16 July; 17:24:07 | (United States) UGM-27 Polaris A3 | | (United States) USS Daniel Boone, ETR | | (United States) US Navy | |
| 16 July; 17:24:07 | | US Navy | Suborbital | Missile test | 16 July | Launch failure |
| 16 July; 17:24:07 | Apogee: 500 kilometres (310 mi) | | | | | |
| 17 July; 05:15 | (United States) HAD | | (Australia) Carnarvon | | (Australia) WRE | |
| 17 July; 05:15 | | WRE | Suborbital | Aeronomy | 17 July | Successful |
| 17 July; 05:15 | Apogee: 120 kilometres (75 mi) | | | | | |
| 17 July; 08:24 | (United States) Nike-Apache | | (United States) Cape Canaveral | | (United States) US Air Force | |
| 17 July; 08:24 | | AFCRL | Suborbital | Aeronomy | 17 July | Successful |
| 17 July; 08:24 | Apogee: 105 kilometres (65 mi) | | | | | |
| 17 July | (United States) MGM-31 Pershing I | | (United States) Black Mesa | | (United States) US Air Force | |
| 17 July | | US Air Force | Suborbital | Missile test | 17 July | Successful |
| 17 July | Apogee: 250 kilometres (160 mi) | | | | | |
| 17 July | (Soviet Union) R-12 Dvina | | (Soviet Union) Sovetskaya Gavan | | (Soviet Union) MVS | |
| 17 July | | MVS | Suborbital | Missile test | 17 July | Successful |
| 17 July | Apogee: 402 kilometres (250 mi) | | | | | |
| 17 July | (Soviet Union) R-12 Dvina | | (Soviet Union) Kapustin Yar | | (Soviet Union) MVS | |
| 17 July | | MVS | Suborbital | Missile test | 17 July | Successful |
| 17 July | Apogee: 402 kilometres (250 mi) | | | | | |
| 18 July; 04:30 | (Soviet Union) R-17 Elbrus | | (Soviet Union) Kapustin Yar | | (Soviet Union) MVS | |
| 18 July; 04:30 | | MVS | Suborbital | Missile test | 18 July | Successful |
| 18 July; 04:30 | Apogee: 250 kilometres (160 mi) | | | | | |
| 18 July; 12:22 | (United States) Astrobee-200 | | (Canada) Churchill | | (United States) US Air Force | |
| 18 July; 12:22 | | AFCRL | Suborbital | Aeronomy | 18 July | Successful |
| 18 July; 12:22 | Apogee: 207 kilometres (129 mi) | | | | | |
| 20 July; 10:53 | (United States) Scout X-4 | | (United States) Wallops Island LA-3A | | (United States) NASA | |
| 20 July; 10:53 | (United States) SERT-1 | NASA | Suborbital | Technology | 20 July | Partial spacecraft failure |
| 20 July; 10:53 | Apogee: 4,002 kilometres (2,487 mi), first launch from LA-3A at the Wallops Flight Facility, carried caesium and mercury ion engines, caesium engine failed to start | | | | | |
| 20 July; 17:30 | (United States) Nike-Tomahawk | | (United States) Barking Sands | | (United States) Sandia | |
| 20 July; 17:30 | | NASA | Suborbital | Technology | 20 July | Successful |
| 20 July; 17:30 | Apogee: 287 kilometres (178 mi) | | | | | |
| 21 July | (Soviet Union) R-12 Dvina | | (Soviet Union) Sovetskaya Gavan | | (Soviet Union) MVS | |
| 21 July | | MVS | Suborbital | Missile test | 21 July | Launch failure |
| 21 July | (United States) Nike-Tomahawk | | (United States) Barking Sands | | (United States) Sandia | |
| 21 July | | LASL | Suborbital | Solar | 21 July | Successful |
| 21 July | Apogee: 270 kilometres (170 mi) | | | | | |
| 21 July | (Soviet Union) R-16U | | (Soviet Union) Baikonur Site 41/4 | | (Soviet Union) RVSN | |
| 21 July | | RVSN | Suborbital | Missile test | 21 July | Successful |
| 21 July | Apogee: 1,210 kilometres (750 mi) | | | | | |
| 22 July; 02:50 | (Japan) LS-A | | (Japan) Niijima | | (France) STA | |
| 22 July; 02:50 | | STA | Suborbital | Test flight | 22 July | Successful |
| 22 July; 02:50 | Apogee: 150 kilometres (93 mi) | | | | | |
| 22 July; 08:55 | (Japan) LS-A | | (Japan) Niijima | | (France) STA | |
| 22 July; 08:55 | | STA | Suborbital | Test flight | 22 July | Successful |
| 22 July; 08:55 | Apogee: 150 kilometres (93 mi) | | | | | |
| 22 July | (United States) Nike-Tomahawk | | (United States) Barking Sands | | (United States) Sandia | |
| 22 July | | LASL | Suborbital | Solar | 22 July | Successful |
| 22 July | Apogee: 321 kilometres (199 mi) | | | | | |
| 22 July | (United States) MGM-31 Pershing I | | (United States) Black Mesa | | (United States) US Air Force | |
| 22 July | | US Air Force | Suborbital | Missile test | 22 July | Successful |
| 22 July | Apogee: 250 kilometres (160 mi) | | | | | |
| 23 July; 18:43 | (United States) Aerobee-150 (Hi) | | (Canada) Churchill | | (United States) NASA | |
| 23 July; 18:43 | | NASA | Suborbital | Cosmic ray research | 23 July | Successful |
| 23 July; 18:43 | Apogee: 233 kilometres (145 mi) | | | | | |
| 25 July; 17:35 | (United States) Aerobee-150 (Hi) | | (Canada) Churchill | | (United States) NASA | |
| 25 July; 17:35 | | NASA | Suborbital | Cosmic ray research | 25 July | Successful |
| 25 July; 17:35 | Apogee: 215 kilometres (134 mi) | | | | | |
| 26 July; 09:07 | (Japan) Kappa-8L | | (Japan) Kagoshima | | (Japan) ISAS | |
| 26 July; 09:07 | | ISAS | Suborbital | Aeronomy | 26 July | Successful |
| 26 July; 09:07 | Apogee: 124 kilometres (77 mi) | | | | | |
| 26 July; 10:51 | (Japan) Kappa-8L | | (Japan) Kagoshima | | (Japan) ISAS | |
| 26 July; 10:51 | | TAO | Suborbital | Aeronomy | 26 July | Successful |
| 26 July; 10:51 | Apogee: 112 kilometres (70 mi) | | | | | |
| 27 July | (United States) LGM-30A Minuteman IA | | (United States) Vandenberg LF-06 | | (United States) Strategic Air Command | |
| 27 July | | Strategic Air Command | Suborbital | Missile test | 27 July | Successful |
| 27 July | Apogee: 1,300 kilometres (810 mi) | | | | | |
| 27 July | (Soviet Union) R-7A Semyorka | | (Soviet Union) Baikonur Site 31/6 | | (Soviet Union) RVSN | |
| 27 July | | RVSN | Suborbital | Missile test | 27 July | Successful |
| 27 July | Apogee: 1,350 kilometres (840 mi) | | | | | |
| 28 July; 20:06 | (United States) Nike-Apache | | (United States) White Sands LC-33 | | (United States) US Air Force | |
| 28 July; 20:06 | | AFCRL | Suborbital | Aeronomy | 28 July | Successful |
| 28 July; 20:06 | Apogee: 200 kilometres (120 mi) | | | | | |
| 28 July; 21:14 | (United States) Aerobee-300 | | (Canada) Churchill | | (United States) NASA | |
| 28 July; 21:14 | | NASA | Suborbital | Aeronomy | 28 July | Successful |
| 28 July; 21:14 | Apogee: 322 kilometres (200 mi) | | | | | |
| 29 July; 09:22:56 | (United States) SM-65D Atlas | | (United States) Vandenberg LC-576A-3 | | (United States) Strategic Air Command | |
| 29 July; 09:22:56 | | Strategic Air Command | Suborbital | Target | 29 July | Successful |
| 29 July; 09:22:56 | Apogee: 1,800 kilometres (1,100 mi) | | | | | |
| 29 July; 09:30 | (United States) Nike-Apache | | (United States) White Sands | | (United States) US Air Force | |
| 29 July; 09:30 | | AFCRL | Suborbital | Aeronomy | 29 July | Successful |
| 29 July; 09:30 | Apogee: 200 kilometres (120 mi) | | | | | |
| 29 July; 10:07 | (Japan) Kappa-9M | | (Japan) Kagoshima | | (Japan) ISAS | |
| 29 July; 10:07 | | ISAS | Suborbital | Cosmic ray research | 29 July | Successful |
| 29 July; 10:07 | Apogee: 300 kilometres (190 mi) | | | | | |
| 30 July; 16:30:03 | (United States) UGM-27 Polaris A3 | | (United States) USS Daniel Boone, ETR | | (United States) US Navy | |
| 30 July; 16:30:03 | | US Navy | Suborbital | Missile test | 30 July | Successful |
| 30 July; 16:30:03 | Apogee: 1,000 kilometres (620 mi) | | | | | |
| 30 July; 17:00:03 | (United States) UGM-27 Polaris A3 | | (United States) USS Daniel Boone, ETR | | (United States) US Navy | |
| 30 July; 17:00:03 | | US Navy | Suborbital | Missile test | 30 July | Successful |
| 30 July; 17:00:03 | Apogee: 1,000 kilometres (620 mi) | | | | | |
| 30 July | (United States) Nike-Tomahawk | | (United States) Barking Sands | | (United States) Sandia | |
| 30 July | | Sandia | Suborbital | Aeronomy | 30 July | Successful |
| 30 July | Apogee: 311 kilometres (193 mi) | | | | | |
| 30 July | (United States) LGM-25C Titan II | | (United States) Vandenberg LC-395D | | (United States) Strategic Air Command | |
| 30 July | | Strategic Air Command | Suborbital | Missile test | 30 July | Successful |
| 30 July | Apogee: 1,300 kilometres (810 mi) | | | | | |
| 31 July | (Soviet Union) R-12 Dvina | | (Soviet Union) Kapustin Yar | | (Soviet Union) MVS | |
| 31 July | | MVS | Suborbital | Missile test | 31 July | Successful |
| 31 July | Apogee: 402 kilometres (250 mi) | | | | | |
| 31 July | (Soviet Union) R-16U | | (Soviet Union) Baikonur | | (Soviet Union) RVSN | |
| 31 July | | RVSN | Suborbital | Missile test | 31 July | Successful |
| 31 July | Apogee: 1,210 kilometres (750 mi) | | | | | |
| July | (United States) MGM-31 Pershing I | | (United States) Fort Wingate | | (United States) US Army | |
| July | | US Army | Suborbital | Missile test | July | Successful |
| July | Apogee: 250 kilometres (160 mi) | | | | | |
| July | (United States) MGM-31 Pershing I | | (United States) Fort Wingate | | (United States) US Army | |
| July | | US Army | Suborbital | Missile test | July | Successful |
| July | Apogee: 250 kilometres (160 mi) | | | | | |
=== August ===
| 1 August; 05:54:49 | (Soviet Union) UR-200 | | (Soviet Union) Baikonur Site 90/19 | | (Soviet Union) RVSN | |
| 1 August; 05:54:49 | | RVSN | Suborbital | Missile test | 1 August | Successful |
| 1 August; 05:54:49 | Apogee: 686 kilometres (426 mi) | | | | | |
| 1 August | (France) Dragon | | (Norway) Myrdalsandir | | (France) CNES | |
| 1 August | | CNRS | Suborbital | Aeronomy; Ionospheric | 1 August | Successful |
| 1 August | Apogee: 440 kilometres (270 mi) | | | | | |
| 4 August | (Soviet Union) R-12 Dvina | | (Soviet Union) Kapustin Yar | | (Soviet Union) MVS | |
| 4 August | | MVS | Suborbital | Missile test | 4 August | Successful |
| 4 August | Apogee: 402 kilometres (250 mi) | | | | | |
| 5 August; 02:00:29 | (Soviet Union) R-36 | | (Soviet Union) Baikonur Site 67/22 | | (Soviet Union) RVSN | |
| 5 August; 02:00:29 | | RVSN | Suborbital | Missile test | 5 August | Successful |
| 5 August; 02:00:29 | Apogee: 1,493 kilometres (928 mi) | | | | | |
| 5 August; 17:15 | (United Kingdom) Black Knight 301 | | (Australia) Woomera LA-5 | | (United Kingdom) RAE | |
| 5 August; 17:15 | | RAE | Suborbital | REV Test | 5 August | Successful |
| 5 August; 17:15 | Apogee: 602 kilometres (374 mi) | | | | | |
| 5 August | (United States) Nike-Tomahawk | | (United States) Barking Sands | | (United States) Sandia | |
| 5 August | | LASL | Suborbital | Solar | 5 August | Successful |
| 5 August | Apogee: 300 kilometres (190 mi) | | | | | |
| 6 August; 16:30 | (United States) UGM-27 Polaris A3 | | (United States) USS Tecumseh, ETR | | (United States) US Navy | |
| 6 August; 16:30 | | US Navy | Suborbital | Missile test | 6 August | Successful |
| 6 August; 16:30 | Apogee: 1,000 kilometres (620 mi) | | | | | |
| 6 August; 23:29 | (United States) Nike-Apache | | (Sweden) Kronogard | | (United States) NASA | |
| 6 August; 23:29 | | AFCRL | Suborbital | Aeronomy | 6 August | Successful |
| 6 August; 23:29 | Apogee: 125 kilometres (78 mi) | | | | | |
| 6 August | (Soviet Union) R-12 Dvina | | (Soviet Union) Kapustin Yar | | (Soviet Union) MVS | |
| 6 August | | MVS | Suborbital | Missile test | 6 August | Successful |
| 6 August | Apogee: 402 kilometres (250 mi) | | | | | |
| 6 August | (Soviet Union) R-12 Dvina | | (Soviet Union) Sovetskaya Gavan | | (Soviet Union) MVS | |
| 6 August | | MVS | Suborbital | Missile test | 6 August | Successful |
| 6 August | Apogee: 402 kilometres (250 mi) | | | | | |
| 7 August; 00:16 | (United States) Nike-Cajun | | (Sweden) Kronogard | | (United States) NASA | |
| 7 August; 00:16 | | NASA | Suborbital | Aeronomy | 7 August | Successful |
| 7 August; 00:16 | Apogee: 130 kilometres (81 mi) | | | | | |
| 7 August; 01:00 | (United States) Nike-Cajun | | (United States) Wallops Island | | (United States) NASA | |
| 7 August; 01:00 | | NASA | Suborbital | Aeronomy | 7 August | Successful |
| 7 August; 01:00 | Apogee: 119 kilometres (74 mi) | | | | | |
| 7 August; 20:12 | (United States) SM-65F Atlas | | (United States) Vandenberg LC-576E | | (United States) Strategic Air Command | |
| 7 August; 20:12 | | Strategic Air Command | Suborbital | Missile test | 7 August | Successful |
| 7 August; 20:12 | Apogee: 1,400 kilometres (870 mi) | | | | | |
| 7 August | (United States) LGM-30B Minuteman IB | | (United States) Vandenberg LF-03 | | (United States) Strategic Air Command | |
| 7 August | | Strategic Air Command | Suborbital | Missile test | 7 August | Successful |
| 7 August | Apogee: 1,300 kilometres (810 mi) | | | | | |
| 7 August | (France) Dragon | | (Norway) Myrdalsandir | | (France) CNES | |
| 7 August | | CNRS | Suborbital | Aeronomy; Ionospheric | 7 August | Successful |
| 7 August | Apogee: 420 kilometres (260 mi) | | | | | |
| 8 August; 04:00 | (United States) Nike-Cajun | | (Canada) Churchill | | (United States) NASA | |
| 8 August; 04:00 | | NASA | Suborbital | Aeronomy | 8 August | Successful |
| 8 August; 04:00 | Apogee: 139 kilometres (86 mi) | | | | | |
| 8 August | (United States) Nike-Tomahawk | | (United States) Barking Sands | | (United States) Sandia | |
| 8 August | | LASL | Suborbital | Solar | 8 August | Successful |
| 8 August | Apogee: 307 kilometres (191 mi) | | | | | |
| 9 August | (Soviet Union) R-16U | | (Soviet Union) Baikonur Site 41/4 | | (Soviet Union) RVSN | |
| 9 August | | RVSN | Suborbital | Missile test | 9 August | Successful |
| 9 August | Apogee: 1,210 kilometres (750 mi) | | | | | |
| 10 August | (United States) Hydra-Iris | | (United States) USNS Wheeling, PO-6 | | (United States) US Navy | |
| 10 August | | NASA | Suborbital | Magnetospheric | 10 August | Successful |
| 10 August | Apogee: 200 kilometres (120 mi) | | | | | |
| 11 August; 02:00:05 | (Soviet Union) R-36 | | (Soviet Union) Baikonur Site 67/22 | | (Soviet Union) RVSN | |
| 11 August; 02:00:05 | | RVSN | Suborbital | Missile test | 11 August | Launch failure |
| 11 August; 05:10 | (United Kingdom) Skylark-7C | | (Australia) Woomera LA-2 | | (United Kingdom) (Australia) RAE/WRE | |
| 11 August; 05:10 | | CULH | Suborbital | Solar | 11 August | Successful |
| 11 August; 05:10 | Apogee: 145 kilometres (90 mi) | | | | | |
| 11 August; 10:30 | (United States) Aerobee-150 (Hi) | | (United States) White Sands LC-35 | | (United States) NASA | |
| 11 August; 10:30 | | NASA | Suborbital | UV Astronomy | 11 August | Successful |
| 11 August; 10:30 | Apogee: 172 kilometres (107 mi) | | | | | |
| 11 August | (United States) LGM-25C Titan II | | (United States) Vandenberg LC-395C | | (United States) Strategic Air Command | |
| 11 August | | Strategic Air Command | Suborbital | Missile test | 11 August | Successful |
| 11 August | Apogee: 1,300 kilometres (810 mi) | | | | | |
| 12 August; 00:43 | (United States) Nike-Apache | | (Sweden) Kronogard | | (United States) NASA | |
| 12 August; 00:43 | | AFCRL | Suborbital | Aeronomy | 12 August | Successful |
| 12 August; 00:43 | Apogee: 121 kilometres (75 mi) | | | | | |
| 12 August; 01:11 | (United States) Nike-Cajun | | (Sweden) Kronogard | | (United States) NASA | |
| 12 August; 01:11 | | NASA | Suborbital | Aeronomy | 12 August | Successful |
| 12 August; 01:11 | Apogee: 130 kilometres (81 mi) | | | | | |
| 12 August; 01:49 | (United States) Nike-Cajun | | (United States) Wallops Island | | (United States) NASA | |
| 12 August; 01:49 | | NASA | Suborbital | Aeronomy | 12 August | Successful |
| 12 August; 01:49 | Apogee: 114 kilometres (71 mi) | | | | | |
| 12 August; 02:15 | (United States) Nike-Cajun | | (Canada) Churchill | | (United States) NASA | |
| 12 August; 02:15 | | NASA | Suborbital | Aeronomy | 12 August | Successful |
| 12 August; 02:15 | Apogee: 126 kilometres (78 mi) | | | | | |
| 12 August; 03:00:12 | (Soviet Union) R-17 Elbrus | | (Soviet Union) Kapustin Yar | | (Soviet Union) MVS | |
| 12 August; 03:00:12 | | MVS | Suborbital | Missile test | 12 August | Successful |
| 12 August; 03:00:12 | Apogee: 246 kilometres (153 mi) | | | | | |
| 13 August | (United States) LGM-25C Titan II | | (United States) Vandenberg LC-395B | | (United States) Strategic Air Command | |
| 13 August | | Strategic Air Command | Suborbital | Missile test | 13 August | Successful |
| 13 August | Apogee: 1,300 kilometres (810 mi) | | | | | |
| 16 August; 00:53 | (United States) Nike-Apache | | (Sweden) Kronogard | | (United States) NASA | |
| 16 August; 00:53 | | AFCRL | Suborbital | Aeronomy | 16 August | Successful |
| 16 August; 00:53 | Apogee: 119 kilometres (74 mi) | | | | | |
| 16 August; 01:13 | (United States) Nike-Cajun | | (Sweden) Kronogard | | (United States) NASA | |
| 16 August; 01:13 | | NASA | Suborbital | Aeronomy | 16 August | Successful |
| 16 August; 01:13 | Apogee: 135 kilometres (84 mi) | | | | | |
| 16 August; 03:15 | (United States) Nike-Cajun | | (United States) Wallops Island | | (United States) NASA | |
| 16 August; 03:15 | | NASA | Suborbital | Aeronomy | 16 August | Successful |
| 16 August; 03:15 | Apogee: 122 kilometres (76 mi) | | | | | |
| 16 August; 05:53 | (United States) Nike-Cajun | | (United Kingdom) Ascension | | (United States) NASA | |
| 16 August; 05:53 | | NASA | Suborbital | Aeronomy | 16 August | Successful |
| 16 August; 05:53 | Apogee: 123 kilometres (76 mi) | | | | | |
| 17 August; 00:29 | (United States) Nike-Apache | | (Sweden) Kronogard | | (United States) NASA | |
| 17 August; 00:29 | | AFCRL | Suborbital | Aeronomy | 17 August | Successful |
| 17 August; 00:29 | Apogee: 124 kilometres (77 mi) | | | | | |
| 17 August; 00:49 | (United States) Nike-Cajun | | (Sweden) Kronogard | | (United States) NASA | |
| 17 August; 00:49 | | NASA | Suborbital | Aeronomy | 17 August | Successful |
| 17 August; 00:49 | Apogee: 132 kilometres (82 mi) | | | | | |
| 17 August; 12:55 | (United States) Nike-Cajun | | (United Kingdom) Ascension | | (United States) NASA | |
| 17 August; 12:55 | | NASA | Suborbital | Aeronomy | 17 August | Successful |
| 17 August; 12:55 | Apogee: 122 kilometres (76 mi) | | | | | |
| 17 August | (United States) LGM-30A Minuteman IA | | (United States) Vandenberg LF-05 | | (United States) Strategic Air Command | |
| 17 August | | Strategic Air Command | Suborbital | Missile test | 17 August | Successful |
| 17 August | Apogee: 1,300 kilometres (810 mi) | | | | | |
| 18 August; 01:15 | (United States) Nike-Cajun | | (Canada) Churchill | | (United States) NASA | |
| 18 August; 01:15 | | NASA | Suborbital | Aeronomy | 18 August | Successful |
| 18 August; 01:15 | Apogee: 124 kilometres (77 mi) | | | | | |
| 18 August; 01:25 | (United States) Nike-Cajun | | (United States) Wallops Island | | (United States) NASA | |
| 18 August; 01:25 | | NASA | Suborbital | Aeronomy | 18 August | Successful |
| 18 August; 01:25 | Apogee: 120 kilometres (75 mi) | | | | | |
| 18 August; 06:05 | (United States) Scout X-4A | | (United States) Wallops Island LA-3 | | (United States) NASA | |
| 18 August; 06:05 | | NASA | Suborbital | REV Test | 18 August | Successful |
| 18 August; 06:05 | Apogee: 183 kilometres (114 mi) | | | | | |
| 20 August; 05:36 | (United Kingdom) Skylark-7C | | (Australia) Woomera LA-2 | | (United Kingdom) (Australia) RAE/WRE | |
| 20 August; 05:36 | | Wales | Suborbital | Ionospheric; Solar | 20 August | Successful |
| 20 August; 05:36 | Apogee: 192 kilometres (119 mi) | | | | | |
| 20 August; 09:02 | (United States) HAD | | (Australia) Woomera LA-2 | | (Australia) WRE | |
| 20 August; 09:02 | | WRE | Suborbital | Aeronomy | 20 August | Successful |
| 20 August; 09:02 | Apogee: 119 kilometres (74 mi) | | | | | |
| 20 August; 16:30:02 | (United States) UGM-27 Polaris A3 | | (United States) USS Tecumseh, ETR | | (United States) US Navy | |
| 20 August; 16:30:02 | | US Navy | Suborbital | Missile test | 20 August | Successful |
| 20 August; 16:30:02 | Apogee: 1,000 kilometres (620 mi) | | | | | |
| 20 August | (Soviet Union) R-12 Dvina | | (Soviet Union) Kapustin Yar | | (Soviet Union) MVS | |
| 20 August | | MVS | Suborbital | Missile test | 20 August | Successful |
| 20 August | Apogee: 402 kilometres (250 mi) | | | | | |
| 21 August | (United States) LGM-30B Minuteman IB | | (United States) Vandenberg LF-08 | | (United States) Strategic Air Command | |
| 21 August | | Strategic Air Command | Suborbital | Missile test | 21 August | Successful |
| 21 August | Apogee: 1,300 kilometres (810 mi) | | | | | |
| 22 August; 10:15 | (United States) Aerobee-150 (Hi) | | (United States) White Sands LC-35 | | (United States) NASA | |
| 22 August; 10:15 | | NASA | Suborbital | UV Astronomy | 22 August | Successful |
| 22 August; 10:15 | Apogee: 123 kilometres (76 mi) | | | | | |
| 25 August | (United States) LGM-30B Minuteman IB | | (United States) Vandenberg LF-07 | | (United States) Strategic Air Command | |
| 25 August | | Strategic Air Command | Suborbital | Missile test | 25 August | Successful |
| 25 August | Apogee: 1,300 kilometres (810 mi) | | | | | |
| 26 August; 17:01 | (United States) Nike-Apache | | (United States) Wallops Island | | (United States) NASA | |
| 26 August; 17:01 | | NASA | Suborbital | Ionospheric | 26 August | Successful |
| 26 August; 17:01 | Apogee: 154 kilometres (96 mi) | | | | | |
| 26 August | (United States) Nike-Cajun | | (United States) Eglin | | (United States) US Air Force | |
| 26 August | | US Air Force | Suborbital | Aeronomy | 26 August | Successful |
| 26 August | Apogee: 100 kilometres (62 mi) | | | | | |
| 26 August | (Soviet Union) R-12 Dvina | | (Soviet Union) Sovetskaya Gavan | | (Soviet Union) MVS | |
| 26 August | | MVS | Suborbital | Missile test | 26 August | Successful |
| 26 August | Apogee: 402 kilometres (250 mi) | | | | | |
| 27 August; 09:54:00 | (United States) SM-65E Atlas | | (United States) Vandenberg LC-576F | | (United States) Strategic Air Command | |
| 27 August; 09:54:00 | | Strategic Air Command | Suborbital | Target | 27 August | Successful |
| 27 August; 09:54:00 | Apogee: 1,600 kilometres (990 mi) | | | | | |
| 29 August; 05:30 | (United States) Aerobee-150 (Hi) | | (United States) White Sands LC-35 | | (United States) NASA | |
| 29 August; 05:30 | | ASE/MIT | Suborbital | XR astronomy | 29 August | Successful |
| 29 August; 05:30 | Apogee: 179 kilometres (111 mi) | | | | | |
| 29 August; 09:36:53 | (United States) Blue Scout Junior SLV-1B | | (United States) Vandenberg PALC-A | | (United States) US Air Force | |
| 29 August; 09:36:53 | | EOS; WPAT | Suborbital | Technology | 29 August | Successful |
| 29 August; 09:36:53 | Apogee: 2,000 kilometres (1,200 mi) | | | | | |
| 31 August; 15:46:17 | (United States) SM-65F Atlas | | (United States) Vandenberg LC-576D | | (United States) Strategic Air Command | |
| 31 August; 15:46:17 | | Strategic Air Command | Suborbital | Missile test | 31 August | Successful |
| 31 August; 15:46:17 | Apogee: 1,400 kilometres (870 mi) | | | | | |
| August | (United States) Nike-Apache | | (United States) White Sands | | (United States) US Army | |
| August | | US Army | Suborbital | Target | August | Successful |
| August | Apogee: 100 kilometres (62 mi) | | | | | |
| August | (United States) Nike-Apache | | (United States) White Sands | | (United States) US Army | |
| August | | US Army | Suborbital | Target | August | Successful |
| August | Apogee: 100 kilometres (62 mi) | | | | | |
=== September ===
| 1 September; 09:19 | (United Kingdom) Skylark-7C | | (Australia) Woomera LA-2 | | (United Kingdom) (Australia) RAE/WRE | |
| 1 September; 09:19 | | Met Office | Suborbital | Aeronomy | 1 September | Successful |
| 1 September; 09:19 | Apogee: 212 kilometres (132 mi) | | | | | |
| 1 September | (United States) LGM-30A Minuteman IA | | (United States) Vandenberg LF-04 | | (United States) Strategic Air Command | |
| 1 September | | Strategic Air Command | Suborbital | Missile test | 1 September | Successful |
| 1 September | Apogee: 1,300 kilometres (810 mi) | | | | | |
| 2 September; 03:08 | (United States) Aerobee-150A | | (United States) Wallops Island | | (United States) NASA | |
| 2 September; 03:08 | | Wisconsin | Suborbital | UV Astronomy | 2 September | Successful |
| 2 September; 03:08 | Apogee: 156 kilometres (97 mi) | | | | | |
| 2 September; 16:45 | (Soviet Union) R-17 Elbrus | | (Soviet Union) Kapustin Yar | | (Soviet Union) MVS | |
| 2 September; 16:45 | | MVS | Suborbital | Missile test | 2 September | Launch failure |
| 4 September; 01:20 | (United Kingdom) Skylark-5C | | (Australia) Woomera LA-2 | | (United Kingdom) (Australia) RAE/WRE | |
| 4 September; 01:20 | | RAE/WRE | Suborbital | Test flight | 4 September | Launch failure |
| 4 September; 01:20 | Apogee: 182 kilometres (113 mi) | | | | | |
| 5 September; 16:30:03 | (United States) UGM-27 Polaris A3 | | (United States) USS Ulysses S. Grant, ETR | | (United States) US Navy | |
| 5 September; 16:30:03 | | US Navy | Suborbital | Missile test | 5 September | Successful |
| 5 September; 16:30:03 | Apogee: 1,000 kilometres (620 mi) | | | | | |
| 8 September; 03:43 | (Canada) Black Brant II | | (Canada) Churchill | | (Canada) NRC | |
| 8 September; 03:43 | | ALB | Suborbital | Ionospheric | 8 September | Launch failure |
| 8 September; 03:43 | Apogee: 20 kilometres (12 mi) | | | | | |
| 8 September | (United States) LGM-30A Minuteman IA | | (United States) Vandenberg LF-06 | | (United States) Strategic Air Command | |
| 8 September | | Strategic Air Command | Suborbital | Missile test | 8 September | Successful |
| 8 September | Apogee: 1,300 kilometres (810 mi) | | | | | |
| 9 September; 02:13:03 | (Soviet Union) R-36 | | (Soviet Union) Baikonur Site 67/22 | | (Soviet Union) RVSN | |
| 9 September; 02:13:03 | | RVSN | Suborbital | Missile test | 9 September | Successful |
| 9 September; 02:13:03 | Apogee: 1,495 kilometres (929 mi) | | | | | |
| 10 September | (United States) LGM-30B Minuteman IB | | (United States) Vandenberg LF-02 | | (United States) Strategic Air Command | |
| 10 September | | Strategic Air Command | Suborbital | Missile test | 10 September | Successful |
| 10 September | Apogee: 1,300 kilometres (810 mi) | | | | | |
| 10 September | (Soviet Union) R-16U | | (Soviet Union) Baikonur Site 41/3 | | (Soviet Union) RVSN | |
| 10 September | | RVSN | Suborbital | Missile test | 10 September | Successful |
| 10 September | Apogee: 1,210 kilometres (750 mi) | | | | | |
| 11 September | (Soviet Union) R-14 Chusovaya | | (Soviet Union) Kapustin Yar | | (Soviet Union) RVSN | |
| 11 September | | RVSN | Suborbital | Missile test | 11 September | Successful |
| 11 September | Apogee: 675 kilometres (419 mi) | | | | | |
| 13 September; 02:57 | (Soviet Union) R-11A-1 | | (Soviet Union) Kapustin Yar | | (Soviet Union) RVSN | |
| 13 September; 02:57 | | FIAN | Suborbital | Test flight | 13 September | Successful |
| 13 September; 02:57 | Apogee: 100 kilometres (62 mi) | | | | | |
| 15 September; 06:59 | (Canada) Black Brant II | | (Canada) Churchill | | (Canada) NRC | |
| 15 September; 06:59 | | SASK | Suborbital | Ionospheric | 15 September | Successful |
| 15 September; 06:59 | Apogee: 166 kilometres (103 mi) | | | | | |
| 15 September; 09:35 | (United States) Aerobee-150 (Hi) | | (United States) White Sands LC-35 | | (United States) KPNO | |
| 15 September; 09:35 | | KPNO | Suborbital | IR Astronomy | 15 September | Successful |
| 15 September; 09:35 | Apogee: 200 kilometres (120 mi) | | | | | |
| 15 September; 15:27 | (United States) SM-65D Atlas | | (United States) Vandenberg LC-576A-1 | | (United States) Strategic Air Command | |
| 15 September; 15:27 | | US Air Force | Suborbital | REV Test | 15 September | Successful |
| 15 September; 15:27 | Apogee: 1,800 kilometres (1,100 mi) | | | | | |
| 15 September | (United States) LGM-30B Minuteman IB | | (United States) Vandenberg LF-08 | | (United States) Strategic Air Command | |
| 15 September | | Strategic Air Command | Suborbital | Missile test | 15 September | Successful |
| 15 September | Apogee: 1,300 kilometres (810 mi) | | | | | |
| 16 September | (Soviet Union) R-12 Dvina | | (Soviet Union) Kapustin Yar | | (Soviet Union) MVS | |
| 16 September | | MVS | Suborbital | Missile test | 16 September | Successful |
| 16 September | Apogee: 402 kilometres (250 mi) | | | | | |
| 17 September; 05:56 | (United Kingdom) Skylark-7C | | (Australia) Woomera LA-2 | | (United Kingdom) (Australia) RAE/WRE | |
| 17 September; 05:56 | | Wales | Suborbital | Ionospheric; Solar | 17 September | Successful |
| 17 September; 05:56 | Apogee: 192 kilometres (119 mi) | | | | | |
| 18 September; 17:17 | (United States) Aerobee-150A | | (United States) Wallops Island | | (United States) NASA | |
| 18 September; 17:17 | | NASA | Suborbital | Aeronomy | 18 September | Successful |
| 18 September; 17:17 | Apogee: 168 kilometres (104 mi) | | | | | |
| 18 September; 17:25 | (United States) Nike-Apache | | (United States) Cape Canaveral | | (United States) US Air Force | |
| 18 September; 17:25 | | AFCRL | Suborbital | Aeronomy; Ionospheric | 18 September | Successful |
| 18 September; 17:25 | Apogee: 105 kilometres (65 mi) | | | | | |
| 21 September; 16:30:03 | (United States) UGM-27 Polaris A3 | | (United States) USS Ulysses S. Grant, ETR | | (United States) US Navy | |
| 21 September; 16:30:03 | | US Navy | Suborbital | Missile test | 21 September | Successful |
| 21 September; 16:30:03 | Apogee: 1,000 kilometres (620 mi) | | | | | |
| 21 September | (United States) LGM-30B Minuteman IB | | (United States) Vandenberg LF-09 | | (United States) Strategic Air Command | |
| 21 September | | Strategic Air Command | Suborbital | Missile test | 21 September | Successful |
| 21 September | Apogee: 1,300 kilometres (810 mi) | | | | | |
| 22 September; 13:10 | (United States) SM-65D Atlas | | (United States) Vandenberg LC-576A-3 | | (United States) Strategic Air Command | |
| 22 September; 13:10 | | Strategic Air Command | Suborbital | Target | 22 September | Successful |
| 22 September; 13:10 | Apogee: 1,800 kilometres (1,100 mi) | | | | | |
| 23 September | (United States) LGM-30B Minuteman IB | | (United States) Vandenberg LF-03 | | (United States) Strategic Air Command | |
| 23 September | | Strategic Air Command | Suborbital | Missile test | 23 September | Successful |
| 23 September | Apogee: 1,300 kilometres (810 mi) | | | | | |
| 24 September; 04:42 | (United Kingdom) Skylark-7C | | (Australia) Woomera LA-2 | | (United Kingdom) (Australia) RAE/WRE | |
| 24 September; 04:42 | | RSRS | Suborbital | Ionospheric; Solar | 24 September | Successful |
| 24 September; 04:42 | Apogee: 180 kilometres (110 mi) | | | | | |
| 24 September; 05:56:15 | (Soviet Union) UR-200 | | (Soviet Union) Baikonur Site 90/20 | | (Soviet Union) RVSN | |
| 24 September; 05:56:15 | | RVSN | Suborbital | Missile test | 24 September | Successful |
| 24 September; 05:56:15 | Apogee: 686 kilometres (426 mi) | | | | | |
| 24 September; 16:04:15 | (United States) LGM-30F Minuteman II | | (United States) Cape Canaveral LC-32B | | (United States) US Air Force | |
| 24 September; 16:04:15 | | US Air Force | Suborbital | Missile test | 24 September | Successful |
| 24 September; 16:04:15 | Apogee: 1,300 kilometres (810 mi) | | | | | |
| 24 September | (Soviet Union) R-9 Desna | | (Soviet Union) Baikonur | | (Soviet Union) RVSN | |
| 24 September | | RVSN | Suborbital | Missile test | 24 September | Successful |
| 24 September | Apogee: 1,160 kilometres (720 mi) | | | | | |
| 25 September; 04:03:33 | (Soviet Union) R-36 | | (Soviet Union) Baikonur Site 67/22 | | (Soviet Union) RVSN | |
| 25 September; 04:03:33 | | RVSN | Suborbital | Missile test | 25 September | Successful |
| 25 September; 04:03:33 | Apogee: 1,000 kilometres (620 mi) | | | | | |
| 25 September | (Soviet Union) R-16U | | (Soviet Union) Baikonur Site 60/8 | | (Soviet Union) RVSN | |
| 25 September | | RVSN | Suborbital | Missile test | 25 September | Successful |
| 25 September | Apogee: 1,210 kilometres (750 mi) | | | | | |
| 25 September | (United States) Tomahawk | | (United States) Wallops Island | | | |
| 25 September | | Sandia | Suborbital | Test flight | 25 September | Successful |
| 25 September | Apogee: 100 kilometres (62 mi) | | | | | |
| 26 September; 02:15 | (United States) Athena RTV | | (United States) Green River Pad 2 | | (United States) US Air Force | |
| 26 September; 02:15 | | US Air Force | Suborbital | REV Test | 26 September | Launch failure |
| 26 September; 02:15 | Apogee: 200 kilometres (120 mi) | | | | | |
| 26 September; 03:50 | (Soviet Union) R-5 VAO | | (Soviet Union) Kapustin Yar Site 84 | | (Soviet Union) RVSN | |
| 26 September; 03:50 | | AN | Suborbital | Ionospheric | 26 September | Launch failure |
| 26 September; 03:50 | Apogee: 500 kilometres (310 mi) | | | | | |
| 26 September; 12:04 | (United States) Aerobee-150A | | (United States) Wallops Island | | (United States) NASA | |
| 26 September; 12:04 | | NASA | Suborbital | Test flight | 26 September | Successful |
| 26 September; 12:04 | Apogee: 120 kilometres (75 mi) | | | | | |
| 27 September | (Soviet Union) R-16U | | (Soviet Union) Baikonur Site 41/4 | | (Soviet Union) RVSN | |
| 27 September | | RVSN | Suborbital | Missile test | 27 September | Successful |
| 27 September | Apogee: 1,210 kilometres (750 mi) | | | | | |
| 28 September; 16:30:03 | (United States) UGM-27 Polaris A3 | | (United States) USS James Madison, ETR | | (United States) US Navy | |
| 28 September; 16:30:03 | | US Navy | Suborbital | Missile test | 28 September | Successful |
| 28 September; 16:30:03 | Apogee: 1,000 kilometres (620 mi) | | | | | |
| 29 September; 04:31 | (United Kingdom) Skylark-7C | | (Australia) Woomera LA-2 | | (United Kingdom) (Australia) RAE/WRE | |
| 29 September; 04:31 | | RSRS | Suborbital | Ionospheric; Solar | 29 September | Successful |
| 29 September; 04:31 | Apogee: 174 kilometres (108 mi) | | | | | |
| 29 September; 21:22:49 | (United States) LGM-30B Minuteman IB | | (United States) Cape Canaveral LC-31B | | (United States) US Air Force | |
| 29 September; 21:22:49 | | US Air Force | Suborbital | Missile test | 29 September | Launch failure |
| 29 September; 21:22:49 | Apogee: 1 kilometre (0.62 mi) | | | | | |
| 29 September | (United States) LGM-30B Minuteman IB | | (United States) Vandenberg LF-07 | | (United States) Strategic Air Command | |
| 29 September | | Strategic Air Command | Suborbital | Missile test | 29 September | Successful |
| 29 September | Apogee: 1,300 kilometres (810 mi) | | | | | |
| 29 September | (Soviet Union) R-16U | | (Soviet Union) Baikonur Site 60/6 | | (Soviet Union) RVSN | |
| 29 September | | RVSN | Suborbital | Missile test | 29 September | Successful |
| 29 September | Apogee: 1,210 kilometres (750 mi) | | | | | |
| 30 September | (Soviet Union) R-12 Dvina | | (Soviet Union) Kapustin Yar | | (Soviet Union) MVS | |
| 30 September | | MVS | Suborbital | Missile test | 30 September | Successful |
| 30 September | Apogee: 402 kilometres (250 mi) | | | | | |
| September | (United States) Nike-Apache | | (United States) White Sands | | (United States) US Army | |
| September | | US Army | Suborbital | Target | September | Successful |
| September | Apogee: 100 kilometres (62 mi) | | | | | |
| September | (United States) Nike-Apache | | (United States) White Sands | | (United States) US Army | |
| September | | US Army | Suborbital | Target | September | Successful |
| September | Apogee: 100 kilometres (62 mi) | | | | | |
| September | (United States) Nike-Javelin | | (United States) White Sands | | (United States) DASA | |
| September | | DASA | Suborbital | Aeronomy | September | Successful |
| September | Apogee: 100 kilometres (62 mi) | | | | | |
| September | (United States) Nike-Javelin | | (United States) White Sands | | (United States) DASA | |
| September | | DASA | Suborbital | Aeronomy | September | Successful |
| September | Apogee: 100 kilometres (62 mi) | | | | | |
| September | (United States) Nike-Javelin | | (United States) White Sands | | (United States) DASA | |
| September | | DASA | Suborbital | Aeronomy | September | Successful |
| September | Apogee: 100 kilometres (62 mi) | | | | | |
| 3rd Quarter | (Australia) Aero High | | (Australia) Woomera LA-2 | | (Australia) WRE | |
| 3rd Quarter | | WRE | Suborbital | Test flight | 3rd Quarter | Launch failure |
| 3rd Quarter | (Australia) Aero High | | (Australia) Woomera LA-2 | | (Australia) WRE | |
| 3rd Quarter | | WRE | Suborbital | Test flight | 3rd Quarter | Launch failure |

- ← Jan
- Feb
- Mar
- Apr
- May
- Jun
- Jul
- Aug
- Sep
- Oct
- Nov
- Dec →
