= Kosmos 25 =

Soviet radar target satellite

- Mission type: ABM Radar target Technology
- COSPAR ID: 1964-010A
- SATCAT no.: 00757
- Mission duration: 268 days

Spacecraft properties
- Spacecraft type: DS-P1
- Manufacturer: Yuzhnoye
- Launch mass: 355 kg

Start of mission
- Launch date: 27 February 1964, 13:26:00 GMT
- Rocket: Kosmos-2I 63S1
- Launch site: Kapustin Yar, Mayak-2
- Contractor: Yuzhnoye

End of mission
- Decay date: 21 November 1964

Orbital parameters
- Reference system: Geocentric
- Regime: Low Earth
- Perigee altitude: 255 km
- Apogee altitude: 526 km
- Inclination: 49.0°
- Period: 92.3 minutes
- Epoch: 27 February 1964

Kosmos 25 (Russian: Космос 25 meaning Cosmos 25), also known as DS-P1 No.4 was a prototype radar target satellite for anti-ballistic missile tests, which was launched by the Soviet Union in 1964 as part of the Dnepropetrovsk Sputnik programme. Its primary mission was to demonstrate the necessary technologies for radar tracking of spacecraft, which would allow future satellites to function as targets.

It was launched aboard a Kosmos-2I 63S1 rocket, from Mayak-2 at Kapustin Yar. The launch occurred at 13:26 GMT on 27 February 1964.

Kosmos 25 was placed into a low Earth orbit with a perigee of 255 kilometres (158 mi), an apogee of 526 kilometres (327 mi), 49.0° of inclination, and an orbital period of 92.3 minutes. It decayed from orbit on 21 November 1964.

Kosmos 25 was a prototype DS-P1 satellite, the last of four to be launched. Of these, it was the third to successfully reach orbit after Kosmos 6 and Kosmos 19. It was succeeded by the first operational DS-P1 satellite, Kosmos 36.

== See also ==
- 1964 in spaceflight
