= 1964 in spaceflight (April–June) =

This is a list of spaceflights launched between April and June 1964. For launches in the rest of the year, see 1964 in spaceflight (January–March), 1964 in spaceflight (July–September) and 1964 in spaceflight (October–December). For an overview of the whole year, see 1964 in spaceflight.

== Orbital launches ==
- ← Jan
- Feb
- Mar
- Apr
- May
- Jun
- Jul
- Aug
- Sep
- Oct
- Nov
- Dec →

Date and time (UTC)	Rocket	Flight number	Launch site		LSP	
Date and time (UTC)	Payload (⚀ = CubeSat)	Operator	Orbit	Function	Decay (UTC)	Outcome
Date and time (UTC)	Remarks					
=== April ===
2 April; 02:42	(Soviet Union) Molniya-M		(Soviet Union) Baikonur Site 1/5		(Soviet Union)	
2 April; 02:42	(Soviet Union) Zond 1 (Venera 3MV-1 №2)		Heliocentric	Venus flyby	In orbit	Spacecraft failure
2 April; 02:42	(Soviet Union) Zond 1 SA		Intended: Heliocentric; Achieved: Low Earth	Venus lander	In orbit	Spacecraft failure
2 April; 02:42	Failed to orbit					
4 April; 09:36	(Soviet Union) Vostok-2		(Soviet Union) Baikonur Site 31/6		(Soviet Union)	
4 April; 09:36	(Soviet Union) Kosmos 28 (Zenit-2 №16)		Low Earth	Optical imaging	12 April	Successful
8 April; 16:00:01	(United States) Titan II GLV		(United States) Cape Canaveral LC-19		(United States) US Air Force	
8 April; 16:00:01	(United States) Gemini 1	NASA	Low Earth	Test flight	12 April; 15:00	Successful
8 April; 16:00:01	Maiden flight of Titan II GLV, first orbital launch of a Titan rocket, and first flight of the Gemini program.					
12 April; 09:30	(Soviet Union) Polyot		(Soviet Union) Baikonur Site 31/6		(Soviet Union)	
12 April; 09:30	(Soviet Union) Polyot 2 (I-151/I-2B №2)		Low Earth	ASAT test Technology	8 June 1966	Successful
12 April; 09:30	Final flight of Polyot rocket, non-intercept flight test of I-2B antisatellite weapon.					
20 April; 08:08:28	(Soviet Union) Molniya-M		(Soviet Union) Baikonur Site 1/5		(Soviet Union)	
20 April; 08:08:28	(Soviet Union) Luna E-6 №5		Intended: Highly elliptical	Lunar flyby	20 April	Launch failure
20 April; 08:08:28	(Soviet Union) Luna E-6 №5 SA		Intended: Highly elliptical Achieved: Low Earth	Lunar lander	20 April	Launch failure
20 April; 08:08:28	Upper stage power system failed 340 seconds after launch, failed to orbit.					
21 April; 18:50	(United States) Thor DSV-2A Ablestar		(United States) Vandenberg LC-75-1-1		(United States) US Air Force	
21 April; 18:50	(United States) Transit 5BN-3	US Navy	Intended: Low Earth	Navigation	21 April	Launch failure
21 April; 18:50	(United States) Transit 5E-4	US Navy	Intended: Low Earth	Radiation	21 April	Launch failure
21 April; 18:50	Failed to orbit, Transit 5BN-3 carried a SNAP-9 RTG.					
23 April; 16:19	(United States) Atlas LV-3A Agena-D		(United States) Point Arguello LC-2-3		(United States) US Air Force	
23 April; 16:19	(United States) OPS 3743 (KH-7 7/4007/AFP-206 SV-957)	US Air Force/NRO	Low Earth	Optical imaging	29 April	Successful
25 April; 10:19	(Soviet Union) Vostok-2		(Soviet Union) Baikonur Site 31/6		(Soviet Union)	
25 April; 10:19	(Soviet Union) Kosmos 29 (Zenit-2 №19)		Low Earth	Optical imaging	3 May	Successful
27 April; 23:23:48	(United States) Thrust Augmented Thor SLV-2A Agena-D		(United States) Vandenberg LC-75-3-4		(United States) US Air Force	
27 April; 23:23:48	(United States) OPS 2921 (KH-4A 5/1005)	US Air Force/NRO	Low Earth	Optical imaging	26 May; 04:36	Spacecraft failure
27 April; 23:23:48	(United States) SRV 618	US Air Force/NRO	Low Earth	Film return	26 May; 04:36	Spacecraft failure
27 April; 23:23:48	(United States) SRV 635	US Air Force/NRO	Low Earth	Film return	26 May; 04:36	Spacecraft failure
27 April; 23:23:48	Film in forward camera broke, Agena power system failed, first SRV commanded to separate on 30 April but failed to do so, spacecraft reentered over Venezuela, with first SRV being recovered by farm workers, images damaged in landing and were unusable.					
← Jan; Feb; Mar; Apr; May; Jun; Jul; Aug; Sep; Oct; Nov; Dec →; === May ===
18 May; 09:50	(Soviet Union) Voskhod		(Soviet Union) Baikonur Site 1/5		(Soviet Union)	
18 May; 09:50	(Soviet Union) Kosmos 30 (Zenit-4 №2)		Low Earth	Optical imaging	26 May	Successful
19 May; 19:21:14	(United States) Atlas LV-3A Agena-D		(United States) Point Arguello LC-2-3		(United States) US Air Force	
19 May; 19:21:14	(United States) OPS 3592 (KH-7 8/4008/AFP-206 SV-958)	US Air Force/NRO	Low Earth	Optical imaging	22 May	Successful
28 May; 17:07:00	(United States) Saturn I		(United States) Cape Canaveral LC-37B		(United States) NASA	
28 May; 17:07:00	(United States) Apollo AS-101 (BP-13)	NASA	Low Earth	Test flight	2 June; 01:00	Successful
28 May; 17:07:00	Boilerplate Apollo spacecraft, first stage engine failure during ascent did not affect flight due to engine-out capability.					
← Jan; Feb; Mar; Apr; May; Jun; Jul; Aug; Sep; Oct; Nov; Dec →; === June ===
4 June; 03:50:55	(United States) Scout X-4		(United States) Point Arguello LC-D		(United States) US Air Force	
4 June; 03:50:55	(United States) OPS 4412 (Transit 5C-1)	US Navy	Low Earth	Technology; Navigation	In orbit	Successful
4 June; 03:50:55	Ceased operations on 23 August 1965.					
4 June; 22:59	(United States) Thrust Augmented Thor SLV-2A Agena-D		(United States) Point Arguello LC-1-1		(United States) US Air Force	
4 June; 22:59	(United States) OPS 3483 (KH-4A 6/1006)	US Air Force/NRO	Low Earth	Optical imaging	18 June	Successful
4 June; 22:59	(United States) SRV 638	US Air Force/NRO	Low Earth	Film return	June	Successful
4 June; 22:59	(United States) SRV 639	US Air Force/NRO	Low Earth	Film return	June	Successful
4 June	(Soviet Union) Molniya		(Soviet Union) Baikonur Site 1/5		(Soviet Union)	
4 June	(Soviet Union) Molniya-1 №2		Intended: Molniya	Communications; Technology	4 June	Launch failure
4 June	Block A throttle jammed closed 104 seconds after launch, failed to orbit.					
6 June; 06:00	(Soviet Union) Kosmos 63S1		(Soviet Union) Kapustin Yar Mayak-2		(Soviet Union)	
6 June; 06:00	(Soviet Union) Kosmos 31 (DS-MT №2)		Low Earth	Technology	20 October	Successful
10 June; 10:48	(Soviet Union) Vostok-2		(Soviet Union) Baikonur Site 31/6		(Soviet Union)	
10 June; 10:48	(Soviet Union) Kosmos 32 (Zenit-2 №18)		Low Earth	Optical imaging	18 June	Successful
13 June; 15:47	(United States) Thrust Augmented Thor SLV-2A Agena-D		(United States) Vandenberg LC-75-1-2		(United States) US Air Force	
13 June; 15:47	(United States) OPS 3236 (KH-5 11/9065A)	US Air Force/NRO	Low Earth	Optical imaging	2 June 1965	Successful
13 June; 15:47	(United States) SRV 661	US Air Force/NRO	Low Earth	Film return	June	Successful
13 June; 15:47	Spacecraft carried Starflash 1A experiment.					
18 June; 04:56:08	(United States) Thor SLV-2 Agena-D		(United States) Vandenberg LC-75-3-4		(United States) US Air Force	
18 June; 04:56:08	(United States) OPS 4467A (DSAP-1 F8/P-35 8)	US Air Force	Low Earth	Weather	In orbit	Successful
18 June; 04:56:08	(United States) OPS 4467B (DSAP-1 F9/P-35 9)	US Air Force	Low Earth	Weather	In orbit	Successful
19 June; 23:18	(United States) Thrust Augmented Thor SLV-2A Agena-D		(United States) Vandenberg LC-75-1-1		(United States) US Air Force	
19 June; 23:18	(United States) OPS 3754 (KH-4A 7/1007)	US Air Force/NRO	Low Earth	Optical imaging	16 July	Successful
19 June; 23:18	(United States) SRV 634	US Air Force/NRO	Low Earth	Film return	June	Successful
19 June; 23:18	(United States) SRV 633	US Air Force/NRO	Low Earth	Film return	June/July	Successful
23 June; 10:19	(Soviet Union) Vostok-2		(Soviet Union) Baikonur Site 31/6		(Soviet Union)	
23 June; 10:19	(Soviet Union) Kosmos 33 (Zenit-2 №20)		Low Earth	Optical imaging	1 July	Successful
25 June; 01:40:24	(United States) Scout X-4		(United States) Point Arguello LC-D		(United States) US Air Force	
25 June; 01:40:24	(United States) ESRS (CRL-2/ENSAT)	US Air Force	Low Earth	Environmental	25 June	Launch failure
25 June; 01:40:24	Second stage exploded.					
30 June; 14:04:22	(United States) Atlas LV-3C Centaur-C	AC-3	(United States) Cape Canaveral LC-36A		(United States) NASA	
30 June; 14:04:22		NASA	Intended: Geosynchronous transfer	Test flight	30 June	Launch failure
30 June; 14:04:22	Maiden flight of Atlas LV-3C Centaur-C, Centaur hydraulic system failed.					
← Jan; Feb; Mar; Apr; May; Jun; Jul; Aug; Sep; Oct; Nov; Dec →
For flights after 30 June, see 1964 in spaceflight (July-September)

== Suborbital launches ==
- ← Jan
- Feb
- Mar
- Apr
- May
- Jun
- Jul
- Aug
- Sep
- Oct
- Nov
- Dec →

Date and time (UTC)	Rocket	Flight number	Launch site		LSP	
Date and time (UTC)	Payload (⚀ = CubeSat)	Operator	Orbit	Function	Decay (UTC)	Outcome
Date and time (UTC)	Remarks					
=== April ===
1 April; 03:10	(Japan) Kappa-8L		(Japan) Kagoshima		(Japan) ISAS	
1 April; 03:10		ISAS	Suborbital	Aeronomy; Fields	1 April	Successful
1 April; 03:10	Apogee: 100 kilometres (62 mi)					
1 April; 20:22	(United States) SM-65F Atlas		(United States) Cape Canaveral LC-11		(United States) US Air Force	
1 April; 20:22		AFCRL	Suborbital	REV test	1 April	Successful
1 April; 20:22	Apogee: 1,400 kilometres (870 mi)					
1 April	(United States) Aerobee-150 (Hi)		(United Kingdom) Walker Cay		(United States) NOTS	
1 April		NOTS	Suborbital	Radiation	1 April	Successful
1 April	Apogee: 200 kilometres (120 mi)					
2 April	(United States) Nike-Apache		(Italy) (Kenya) Santa Rita		(Italy) CRA	
2 April		CRA	Suborbital	Test flight	2 April	Successful
2 April	Apogee: 200 kilometres (120 mi)					
2 April			(Soviet Union) Kapustin Yar		(Soviet Union) MVS	
2 April		MVS	Suborbital	Missile test	2 April	Successful
2 April	Apogee: 200 kilometres (120 mi)					
2 April			(Soviet Union) Kapustin Yar		(Soviet Union) MVS	
2 April		MVS	Suborbital	Missile test	2 April	Successful
2 April	Apogee: 200 kilometres (120 mi)					
3 April; 03:48	(United States) Aerobee-150 (Hi)		(United States) White Sands LC-35		(United States) NASA	
3 April; 03:48		NASA	Suborbital	UV Astronomy	3 April	Successful
3 April; 03:48	Apogee: 190 kilometres (120 mi)					
3 April; 20:26:22	(United States) SM-65F Atlas		(United States) Vandenberg LC-576G		(United States) Strategic Air Command	
3 April; 20:26:22		Strategic Air Command	Suborbital	Missile test	3 April	Launch failure
6 April; 16:30:03	(United States) UGM-27 Polaris A2		(United States) USS Henry Clay, ETR		(United States) US Navy	
6 April; 16:30:03		US Navy	Suborbital	Missile test	6 April	Successful
6 April; 16:30:03	Apogee: 1,000 kilometres (620 mi)					
7 April; 05:29	(Canada) Black Brant II		(Canada) Fort Churchill		(Canada) NRCC	
7 April; 05:29		NRCC	Suborbital	Auroral; Ionospheric; Micrometeoroid research	7 April	Successful
7 April; 05:29	Apogee: 155 kilometres (96 mi)					
7 April; 14:13	(United States) Aerobee-150 (Hi)		(United States) White Sands LC-35		(United States) KPNO	
7 April; 14:13		KPNO	Suborbital	Aeronomy	7 April	Successful
7 April; 14:13	Apogee: 223 kilometres (139 mi)					
8 April; 01:12:56	(United States) LGM-30B Minuteman IB		(United States) Cape Canaveral LC-31B		(United States) US Air Force	
8 April; 01:12:56		US Air Force	Suborbital	Missile test	8 April	Successful
8 April; 01:12:56	Apogee: 1,300 kilometres (810 mi)					
8 April; 07:47	(Canada) Black Brant II		(Canada) Fort Churchill		(Canada) NRCC	
8 April; 07:47		SASK	Suborbital	Auroral; Aeronomy; Ionospheric	8 April	Successful
8 April; 07:47	Apogee: 154 kilometres (96 mi)					
8 April; 08:41	(Soviet Union) R-17 Elbrus		(Soviet Union) Kapustin Yar		(Soviet Union) MVS	
8 April; 08:41		MVS	Suborbital	Missile test	8 April	Successful
8 April; 08:41	Apogee: 278 kilometres (173 mi)					
9 April; 14:22	(United States) Nike-Apache		(Pakistan) Sonmiani		(United States) NASA	
9 April; 14:22		SUPARCO	Suborbital	Aeronomy	9 April	Successful
9 April; 14:22	Apogee: 160 kilometres (99 mi)					
9 April; 21:04:50	(United States) LGM-25C Titan II		(United States) Cape Canaveral LC-15		(United States) US Air Force	
9 April; 21:04:50		AFCRL	Suborbital	Test flight	9 April	Successful
9 April; 21:04:50	Apogee: 1,300 kilometres (810 mi)					
10 April; 04:31	(United States) Aerobee-150 (Hi)		(United States) White Sands LC-35		(United States) NASA	
10 April; 04:31		NASA	Suborbital	UV Astronomy	10 April	Launch failure
10 April; 04:31	Apogee: 74 kilometres (46 mi)					
10 April; 06:30	(United States) Nike-Apache		(Canada) Fort Churchill		(United States) NASA	
10 April; 06:30		Fairbanks	Suborbital	Auroral	10 April	Successful
10 April; 06:30	Apogee: 172 kilometres (107 mi)					
11 April; 07:05:54	(Soviet Union) UR-200		(Soviet Union) Baikonur Site 90/19		(Soviet Union) RVSN	
11 April; 07:05:54		RVSN	Suborbital	Missile test	11 April	Launch failure
11 April; 07:05:54	Apogee: 70 kilometres (43 mi)					
11 April; 09:19	(United Kingdom) Skylark-7C		(Australia) Woomera LA-2		(United Kingdom) (Australia) RAE/WRE	
11 April; 09:19		Met Office	Suborbital	Aeronomy	11 April	Successful
11 April; 09:19	Apogee: 200 kilometres (120 mi)					
11 April	(France) Dragon		(Algeria) Hammaguira Bacchus		(France) CNES	
11 April		CNRS	Suborbital	Aeronomy	11 April	Successful
11 April	Apogee: 400 kilometres (250 mi)					
11 April	(France) Centaure 1		(Algeria) Hammaguira Bacchus		(France) CNES	
11 April		CNRS	Suborbital	Aeronomy	11 April	Successful
11 April	Apogee: 151 kilometres (94 mi)					
13 April; 19:00	(United States) LGM-30B Minuteman IB		(United States) Vandenberg LF-07		(United States) Strategic Air Command	
13 April; 19:00		Strategic Air Command	Suborbital	Missile test	13 April	Successful
13 April; 19:00	Apogee: 1,300 kilometres (810 mi)					
13 April	(France) Dragon		(Algeria) Hammaguira Bacchus		(France) CNES	
13 April		CNRS	Suborbital	Aeronomy	13 April	Successful
13 April	Apogee: 425 kilometres (264 mi)					
13 April	(France) Centaure 1		(Algeria) Hammaguira Bacchus		(France) CNES	
13 April		CNRS	Suborbital	Aeronomy	13 April	Successful
13 April	Apogee: 151 kilometres (94 mi)					
14 April; 06:40	(United States) Nike-Apache		(Canada) Fort Churchill		(United States) NASA	
14 April; 06:40		Fairbanks	Suborbital	Auroral	14 April	Successful
14 April; 06:40	Apogee: 157 kilometres (98 mi)					
14 April; 08:32	(United States) HAD		(Australia) Woomera LA-2		(Australia) WRE	
14 April; 08:32		WRE	Suborbital	Aeronomy	14 April	Successful
14 April; 08:32	Apogee: 121 kilometres (75 mi)					
14 April; 18:30	(United States) Aerobee-150 (Hi)		(United States) White Sands LC-35		(United States) NASA	
14 April; 18:30		NASA	Suborbital	Aeronomy	14 April	Launch failure
14 April; 18:30	Apogee: 31 kilometres (19 mi)					
14 April; 21:42:25	(United States) SM-65D Atlas		(United States) Cape Canaveral LC-12		(United States) NASA	
14 April; 21:42:25		NASA	Suborbital	REV Test	14 April	Successful
14 April; 21:42:25	Apogee: 837 kilometres (520 mi)					
14 April	(France) Véronique		(Algeria) Hammaguira Blandine		(France) CNES	
14 April		CNRS	Suborbital	Solar	14 April	Successful
14 April	Apogee: 119 kilometres (74 mi)					
15 April; 01:21:42	(United States) Nike-Apache		(United Kingdom) Ascension		(United States) NASA	
15 April; 01:21:42		Michigan	Suborbital	Aeronomy	15 April	Successful
15 April; 01:21:42	Apogee: 158 kilometres (98 mi)					
15 April; 15:56:00	(United States) Nike-Apache		(United Kingdom) Ascension		(United States) NASA	
15 April; 15:56:00		Michigan	Suborbital	Aeronomy	15 April	Successful
15 April; 15:56:00	Apogee: 158 kilometres (98 mi)					
15 April; 23:25	(United States) Javelin		(United States) Wallops Island		(United States) NASA	
15 April; 23:25		NASA	Suborbital	Ionospheric	15 April	Successful
15 April; 23:25	Apogee: 727 kilometres (452 mi)					
16 April; 07:16	(Canada) Black Brant II		(Canada) Fort Churchill		(Canada) NRCC	
16 April; 07:16		SASK	Suborbital	Ionospheric; Micrometeoroid research Particles	16 April	Successful
16 April; 07:16	Apogee: 152 kilometres (94 mi)					
16 April; 21:00:05	(United States) Nike-Apache		(United States) Wallops Island		(United States) NASA	
16 April; 21:00:05		Urbana-Champaign	Suborbital	Ionospheric	16 April	Successful
16 April; 21:00:05	Apogee: 168 kilometres (104 mi)					
17 April; 00:44	(Canada) Black Brant II		(Canada) Fort Churchill		(Canada) NRCC	
17 April; 00:44		CBA	Suborbital	Ionospheric	17 April	Successful
17 April; 00:44	Apogee: 172 kilometres (107 mi)					
17 April; 23:15	(United States) Nike-Cajun		(United States) Wallops Island		(United States) NASA	
17 April; 23:15		Michigan	Suborbital	Aeronomy	17 April	Successful
17 April; 23:15	Apogee: 149 kilometres (93 mi)					
18 April; 00:38	(United States) Nike-Cajun		(Canada) Fort Churchill		(United States) NASA	
18 April; 00:38		NASA	Suborbital	Aeronomy	18 April	Successful
18 April; 00:38	Apogee: 119 kilometres (74 mi)					
18 April; 00:59	(United States) Nike-Cajun		(United States) Wallops Island		(United States) NASA	
18 April; 00:59		NASA	Suborbital	Aeronomy	18 April	Successful
18 April; 00:59	Apogee: 119 kilometres (74 mi)					
20 April; 16:30:03	(United States) UGM-27 Polaris A2		(United States) USS Henry Clay, ETR		(United States) US Navy	
20 April; 16:30:03		US Navy	Suborbital	Missile test	20 April	Successful
20 April; 16:30:03	Apogee: 1,000 kilometres (620 mi)					
20 April; 17:00:09	(United States) UGM-27 Polaris A2		(United States) USS Henry Clay, ETR		(United States) US Navy	
20 April; 17:00:09		US Navy	Suborbital	Missile test	20 April	Successful
20 April; 17:00:09	Apogee: 1,000 kilometres (620 mi)					
21 April; 06:15	(United States) Thor DSV-2J		(United States) Johnston LE-2		(United States) US Air Force	
21 April; 06:15		US Air Force	Suborbital	ABM test	21 April	Successful
21 April; 06:15	Apogee: 778 kilometres (483 mi)					
21 April; 16:18	(United States) Aerobee-150 (Hi)		(United States) White Sands LC-35		(United States) NASA	
21 April; 16:18		NASA	Suborbital	Ionospheric; Micrometeoroid research Solar	21 April	Launch failure
21 April; 16:18	Apogee: 11 kilometres (6.8 mi)					
21 April; 23:56	(Canada) Black Brant III		(Canada) Fort Churchill		(Canada) NRCC	
21 April; 23:56		CBA	Suborbital	Test flight	21 April	Successful
21 April; 23:56	Apogee: 150 kilometres (93 mi)					
21 April	(United States) MGM-31 Pershing I		(United States) Hueco		(United States) US Army	
21 April		US Army	Suborbital	Missile test	21 April	Successful
21 April	Apogee: 250 kilometres (160 mi)					
22 April; 06:54	(United States) Nike-Apache		(Canada) Fort Churchill		(United States) NASA	
22 April; 06:54		Fairbanks	Suborbital	Auroral	22 April	Successful
22 April; 06:54	Apogee: 166 kilometres (103 mi)					
23 April; 11:00	(United States) LGM-30B Minuteman IB		(United States) Vandenberg LF-03		(United States) Strategic Air Command	
23 April; 11:00		Strategic Air Command	Suborbital	Missile test	23 April	Successful
23 April; 11:00	Apogee: 1,300 kilometres (810 mi)					
23 April	(United States) MGM-31 Pershing I		(United States) Hueco		(United States) US Army	
23 April		US Army	Suborbital	Missile test	23 April	Successful
23 April	Apogee: 250 kilometres (160 mi)					
24 April; 20:14:17	(United States) LGM-30B Minuteman IB		(United States) Cape Canaveral LC-31B		(United States) US Air Force	
24 April; 20:14:17		US Air Force	Suborbital	Missile test	24 April	Successful
24 April; 20:14:17	Apogee: 1,300 kilometres (810 mi)					
25 April; 06:05:26	(Soviet Union) R-17 Elbrus		(Soviet Union) Kapustin Yar		(Soviet Union) MVS	
25 April; 06:05:26		MVS	Suborbital	Missile test	25 April	Launch failure
25 April	(France) Lex		(France) CERES		(France) ONERA	
25 April		ONERA	Suborbital	Test flight	25 April	Launch failure
25 April	Apogee: 1 kilometre (0.62 mi)					
26 April	(Soviet Union) R-36		(Soviet Union) Baikonur Site 67/22		(Soviet Union) RVSN	
26 April		RVSN	Suborbital	Missile test	26 April	Launch failure
27 April	(United States) LGM-30A Minuteman IA		(United States) Vandenberg LF-05		(United States) Strategic Air Command	
27 April		Strategic Air Command	Suborbital	Missile test	27 April	Successful
27 April	Apogee: 1,300 kilometres (810 mi)					
27 April	(Soviet Union) R-12 Dvina		(Soviet Union) Kapustin Yar		(Soviet Union) MVS	
27 April		MVS	Suborbital	Missile test	27 April	Successful
27 April	Apogee: 402 kilometres (250 mi)					
April	(United States) Nike-Javelin		(United States) White Sands		(United States) DASA	
April		DASA	Suborbital	Aeronomy	April	Successful
April	Apogee: 100 kilometres (62 mi)					
April	(United States) MGM-31 Pershing I		(United States) Fort Wingate		(United States) US Army	
April		US Army	Suborbital	Missile test	April	Successful
April	Apogee: 250 kilometres (160 mi)					
April	(United States) MGM-31 Pershing I		(United States) Fort Wingate		(United States) US Army	
April		US Army	Suborbital	Missile test	April	Successful
April	Apogee: 250 kilometres (160 mi)					
=== May ===
4 May	(France) Centaure 1		(Algeria) Hammaguira Bacchus		(France) CNES	
4 May		CNET	Suborbital	Test flight	4 May	Successful
4 May	Apogee: 151 kilometres (94 mi)					
6 May; 16:00	(United States) Aerobee-150 (Hi)		(United States) White Sands LC-35		(United States) NRL	
6 May; 16:00		NRL	Suborbital	Solar	6 May	Successful
6 May; 16:00	Apogee: 238 kilometres (148 mi)					
7 May; 02:31:00	(United States) Nike-Cajun		(United States) Point Mugu		(United States) US Navy	
7 May; 02:31:00		US Navy	Suborbital	Aeronomy	7 May	
7 May; 02:31:00	Apogee: 110 kilometres (68 mi)					
7 May	(United States) LGM-30B Minuteman IB		(United States) Vandenberg LF-02		(United States) Strategic Air Command	
7 May		Strategic Air Command	Suborbital	Missile test	7 May	Successful
7 May	Apogee: 1,300 kilometres (810 mi)					
8 May	(France) Centaure 1		(Algeria) Hammaguira Bacchus		(France) CNES	
8 May		CNET	Suborbital	Test flight	8 May	Successful
8 May	Apogee: 151 kilometres (94 mi)					
10 May	(France) Centaure 1		(Algeria) Hammaguira Bacchus		(France) CNES	
10 May		GRI	Suborbital	Aeronomy	10 May	Successful
10 May	Apogee: 151 kilometres (94 mi)					
10 May	(France) Centaure 1		(Algeria) Hammaguira Bacchus		(France) CNES	
10 May		CNRS	Suborbital	Aeronomy	10 May	Successful
10 May	Apogee: 151 kilometres (94 mi)					
11 May	(United States) LGM-30A Minuteman IA		(United States) Vandenberg LF-06		(United States) Strategic Air Command	
11 May		Strategic Air Command	Suborbital	Missile test	11 May	Successful
11 May	Apogee: 1,300 kilometres (810 mi)					
12 May; 11:25	(United States) Nike-Cajun		(United States) Kwajalein		(United States) US Navy	
12 May; 11:25		Michigan	Suborbital	Aeronomy	12 May	Successful
12 May; 11:25	Apogee: 144 kilometres (89 mi)					
12 May	(United States) Nike-Tomahawk		(United States) Barking Sands		(United States) Sandia	
12 May		Sandia	Suborbital	Aeronomy	12 May	Successful
12 May	Apogee: 313 kilometres (194 mi)					
14 May; 04:31	(United Kingdom) Skylark-7C		(Australia) Woomera LA-2		(United Kingdom) (Australia) RAE/WRE	
14 May; 04:31		RAE/WRE	Suborbital	Test flight	14 May	Successful
14 May; 04:31	Apogee: 182 kilometres (113 mi)					
14 May	(United States) Nike-Tomahawk		(United States) Barking Sands		(United States) Sandia	
14 May		Sandia	Suborbital	Aeronomy	14 May	Successful
14 May	Apogee: 313 kilometres (194 mi)					
14 May	(France) Centaure 1		(Algeria) Hammaguira Bacchus		(France) CNES	
14 May		GRI	Suborbital	Aeronomy	14 May	Successful
14 May	Apogee: 151 kilometres (94 mi)					
15 May; 06:56:00	(Soviet Union) UR-200		(Soviet Union) Baikonur Site 90/19		(Soviet Union) RVSN	
15 May; 06:56:00		RVSN	Suborbital	Missile test	15 May	Successful
15 May; 06:56:00	Apogee: 689 kilometres (428 mi)					
15 May	(United States) Nike-Tomahawk		(United States) Barking Sands		(United States) Sandia	
15 May		Sandia	Suborbital	Aeronomy	15 May	Successful
15 May	Apogee: 325 kilometres (202 mi)					
15 May	(Soviet Union) R-9 Desna		(Soviet Union) Baikonur		(Soviet Union) RVSN	
15 May		RVSN	Suborbital	Missile test	15 May	Successful
15 May	Apogee: 1,160 kilometres (720 mi)					
18 May; 06:20	(United States) Nike-Apache		(United States) Eglin		(United States) US Air Force	
18 May; 06:20		AFCRL	Suborbital	Test flight	18 May	Successful
18 May; 06:20	Apogee: 208 kilometres (129 mi)					
18 May; 06:20	(United States) Nike-Apache		(United States) Cape Canaveral		(United States) US Air Force	
18 May; 06:20		AFCRL	Suborbital	Aeronomy	18 May	Successful
18 May; 06:20	Apogee: 152 kilometres (94 mi)					
18 May; 18:35	(United States) Nike-Apache		(United States) Cape Canaveral		(United States) US Air Force	
18 May; 18:35		AFCRL	Suborbital	Aeronomy	18 May	Successful
18 May; 18:35	Apogee: 190 kilometres (120 mi)					
18 May	(United States) LGM-30B Minuteman IB		(United States) Vandenberg LF-03		(United States) Strategic Air Command	
18 May		Strategic Air Command	Suborbital	Missile test	18 May	Successful
18 May	Apogee: 1,300 kilometres (810 mi)					
18 May	(United States) Nike-Tomahawk		(United States) Barking Sands		(United States) Sandia	
18 May		Sandia	Suborbital	Aeronomy	18 May	Successful
18 May	Apogee: 300 kilometres (190 mi)					
19 May; 06:45	(United States) Nike-Apache		(United States) Cape Canaveral		(United States) US Air Force	
19 May; 06:45		AFCRL	Suborbital	Aeronomy	19 May	Successful
19 May; 06:45	Apogee: 150 kilometres (93 mi)					
19 May; 18:00	(United States) Nike-Apache		(United States) Cape Canaveral		(United States) US Air Force	
19 May; 18:00		AFCRL	Suborbital	Aeronomy	19 May	Successful
19 May; 18:00	Apogee: 267 kilometres (166 mi)					
20 May	(United States) Nike-Apache		(United States) White Sands		(United States) US Air Force	
20 May		US Air Force	Suborbital	Aeronomy	20 May	Successful
20 May	Apogee: 200 kilometres (120 mi)					
20 May	(United States) Nike-Tomahawk		(United States) Barking Sands		(United States) Sandia	
20 May		Sandia	Suborbital	Test flight	20 May	Successful
20 May	Apogee: 142 kilometres (88 mi)					
20 May			(Soviet Union) Kapustin Yar		(Soviet Union) MVS	
20 May		MVS	Suborbital	Missile test	20 May	Successful
20 May	Apogee: 200 kilometres (120 mi)					
20 May			(Soviet Union) Kapustin Yar		(Soviet Union) MVS	
20 May		MVS	Suborbital	Missile test	20 May	Successful
20 May	Apogee: 200 kilometres (120 mi)					
21 May	(United States) Nike-Tomahawk		(United States) Barking Sands		(United States) Sandia	
21 May		Sandia	Suborbital	Aeronomy	21 May	Successful
21 May	Apogee: 329 kilometres (204 mi)					
23 May; 04:59:50	(Soviet Union) R-36		(Soviet Union) Baikonur Site 67/21		(Soviet Union) RVSN	
23 May; 04:59:50		RVSN	Suborbital	Missile test	23 May	Launch failure
23 May; 04:59:50	Apogee: 870 kilometres (540 mi)					
25 May; 18:29:05	(United States) UGM-27 Polaris A3		(United States) USS Daniel Webster, ETR		(United States) US Navy	
25 May; 18:29:05		US Navy	Suborbital	Missile test	25 May	Successful
25 May; 18:29:05	Apogee: 1,000 kilometres (620 mi)					
25 May; 19:15:06	(United States) UGM-27 Polaris A3		(United States) USS Daniel Webster, ETR		(United States) US Navy	
25 May; 19:15:06		US Navy	Suborbital	Missile test	25 May	Successful
25 May; 19:15:06	Apogee: 1,000 kilometres (620 mi)					
25 May	(United States) LGM-30B Minuteman IB		(United States) Vandenberg LF-07		(United States) Strategic Air Command	
25 May		Strategic Air Command	Suborbital	Missile test	25 May	Successful
25 May	Apogee: 1,300 kilometres (810 mi)					
25 May	(United States) Nike-Tomahawk		(United States) Barking Sands		(United States) Sandia	
25 May		LASL	Suborbital	Solar	25 May	Successful
25 May	Apogee: 290 kilometres (180 mi)					
27 May; 04:30	(United States) Aerobee-150 (Hi)		(United States) White Sands LC-35		(United States) US Air Force	
27 May; 04:30		AFCRL	Suborbital	X-ray astronomy	27 May	Successful
27 May; 04:30	Apogee: 245 kilometres (152 mi)					
27 May	(United States) Nike-Tomahawk		(United States) Barking Sands		(United States) Sandia	
27 May		LASL	Suborbital	Solar	27 May	Successful
27 May	Apogee: 290 kilometres (180 mi)					
28 May; 02:15	(United States) Nike-Apache		(United States) White Sands		(United States) NASA	
28 May; 02:15		US Air Force	Suborbital	Aeronomy	28 May	Launch failure
28 May; 02:15	Apogee: 48 kilometres (30 mi)					
28 May; 07:32	(United States) Thor DSV-2J		(United States) Johnston LE-2		(United States) US Air Force	
28 May; 07:32		US Air Force	Suborbital	ABM test	28 May	Launch failure
28 May; 07:32	Apogee: 932 kilometres (579 mi)					
28 May; 23:15	(United States) Athena RTV		(United States) Green River Pad 2		(United States) US Air Force	
28 May; 23:15		US Air Force	Suborbital	REV Test	28 May	Launch failure
28 May; 23:15	Apogee: 40 kilometres (25 mi)					
28 May	(United States) Aerobee-150 (Hi)		(United Kingdom) Walker Cay		(United States) NOTS	
28 May		NOTS	Suborbital	Radiation	28 May	Successful
28 May	Apogee: 200 kilometres (120 mi)					
30 May; 02:30:30	(Soviet Union) R-36		(Soviet Union) Baikonur Site 67/22		(Soviet Union) RVSN	
30 May; 02:30:30		RVSN	Suborbital	Missile test	30 May	Successful
30 May; 02:30:30	Apogee: 864 kilometres (537 mi)					
30 May; 04:02:51	(Soviet Union) UR-200		(Soviet Union) Baikonur Site 90/19		(Soviet Union) RVSN	
30 May; 04:02:51		RVSN	Suborbital	Missile test	30 May	Successful
30 May; 04:02:51	Apogee: 695 kilometres (432 mi)					
30 May	(Soviet Union) R-16U		(Soviet Union) Baikonur		(Soviet Union) RVSN	
30 May		RVSN	Suborbital	Missile test	30 May	Successful
30 May	Apogee: 1,210 kilometres (750 mi)					
May	(United States) Nike-Javelin		(United States) White Sands		(United States) DASA	
May		DASA	Suborbital	Aeronomy	May	Successful
May	Apogee: 100 kilometres (62 mi)					
May	(United States) Nike-Javelin		(United States) White Sands		(United States) DASA	
May		DASA	Suborbital	Aeronomy	May	Successful
May	Apogee: 100 kilometres (62 mi)					
=== June ===
3 June; 18:45	(United States) Nike-Apache		(United States) Wallops Island		(United States) NASA	
3 June; 18:45		NASA	Suborbital	Ionospheric	3 June	Successful
3 June; 18:45	Apogee: 140 kilometres (87 mi)					
3 June	(Soviet Union) R-7A Semyorka		(Soviet Union) Baikonur Site 31/6		(Soviet Union) RVSN	
3 June		RVSN	Suborbital	Missile test	3 June	Successful
3 June	Apogee: 1,350 kilometres (840 mi)					
4 June; 23:44	(United Kingdom) Blue Streak		(Australia) Woomera LA-6A		(Europe) ELDO	
4 June; 23:44		ELDO	Suborbital		4 June	Successful
4 June; 23:44	Apogee: 157 kilometres (98 mi), maiden flight of Blue Streak, test for the Europa programme					
5 June	(Soviet Union) R-12 Dvina		(Soviet Union) Kapustin Yar		(Soviet Union) MVS	
5 June		MVS	Suborbital	Missile test	5 June	Successful
5 June	Apogee: 402 kilometres (250 mi)					
7 June	(Soviet Union) R-16U		(Soviet Union) Baikonur Site 41/4		(Soviet Union) RVSN	
7 June		RVSN	Suborbital	Missile test	7 June	Successful
7 June	Apogee: 1,210 kilometres (750 mi)					
8 June; 16:34:07	(United States) UGM-27 Polaris A3		(United States) USS Daniel Webster, ETR		(United States) US Navy	
8 June; 16:34:07		US Navy	Suborbital	Missile test	8 June	Successful
8 June; 16:34:07	Apogee: 1,000 kilometres (620 mi)					
8 June; 17:09:07	(United States) UGM-27 Polaris A3		(United States) USS Daniel Webster, ETR		(United States) US Navy	
8 June; 17:09:07		US Navy	Suborbital	Missile test	8 June	Successful
8 June; 17:09:07	Apogee: 1,000 kilometres (620 mi)					
8 June	(France) Veronique 61		(Algeria) Hammaguira Blandine		(France) CNES	
8 June		LRBA	Suborbital	Test flight	8 June	Successful
8 June	Apogee: 260 kilometres (160 mi)					
9 June	(United States) LGM-30A Minuteman IA		(United States) Vandenberg LF-05		(United States) Strategic Air Command	
9 June		Strategic Air Command	Suborbital	Missile test	9 June	Successful
9 June	Apogee: 1,300 kilometres (810 mi)					
10 June; 05:03	(United States) Astrobee-200		(United States) Point Arguello		(United States) US Air Force	
10 June; 05:03		US Air Force	Suborbital	Aeronomy	10 June	Successful
10 June; 05:03	Apogee: 343 kilometres (213 mi)					
10 June; 05:30	(France) Rubis		(Algeria) Hammaguira Bacchus		(France) ONERA	
10 June; 05:30		ONERA	Suborbital	Test flight	10 June	Successful
10 June; 05:30	Apogee: 1,800 kilometres (1,100 mi)					
10 June; 12:44:59	(United States) Aerobee-150 (Hi)		(United States) White Sands LC-35		(United States) NASA	
10 June; 12:44:59		NASA	Suborbital	Micrometeoroid research Technology	10 June	Successful
10 June; 12:44:59	Apogee: 155 kilometres (96 mi)					
10 June; 15:10:00	(United States) Nike-Apache		(United States) Wallops Island		(United States) NASA	
10 June; 15:10:00		NASA	Suborbital	Magnetospheric	10 June	Successful
10 June; 15:10:00	Apogee: 146 kilometres (91 mi)					
11 June; 08:31	(United States) HAD		(Australia) Woomera LA-2		(Australia) WRE	
11 June; 08:31		WRE	Suborbital	Aeronomy	11 June	Successful
11 June; 08:31	Apogee: 113 kilometres (70 mi)					
11 June	(United States) LGM-30A Minuteman IA		(United States) Vandenberg LF-06		(United States) Strategic Air Command	
11 June		Strategic Air Command	Suborbital	Missile test	11 June	Successful
11 June	Apogee: 1,300 kilometres (810 mi)					
11 June	(Soviet Union) R-12 Dvina		(Soviet Union) Kapustin Yar		(Soviet Union) MVS	
11 June		MVS	Suborbital	Missile test	11 June	Successful
11 June	Apogee: 402 kilometres (250 mi)					
12 June; 05:03	(France) Rubis		(Algeria) Hammaguira Bacchus		(France) ONERA	
12 June; 05:03		ONERA	Suborbital	Test flight	12 June	Successful
12 June; 05:03	Apogee: 1,800 kilometres (1,100 mi)					
13 June	(France) Veronique 61		(Algeria) Hammaguira Blandine		(France) CNES	
13 June		LRBA	Suborbital	Test flight	13 June	Successful
13 June	Apogee: 260 kilometres (160 mi)					
15 June; 12:40	(United States) LGM-30B Minuteman IB		(United States) Vandenberg LF-02		(United States) Strategic Air Command	
15 June; 12:40		Strategic Air Command	Suborbital	Missile test	15 June	Successful
15 June; 12:40	Apogee: 1,300 kilometres (810 mi)					
15 June	(France) Emeraude VE121		(Algeria) Hammaguira Brigitte		(France) CNES	
15 June		CNES	Suborbital	Missile test	15 June	Launch failure
16 June; 09:00	(United States) Aerobee-150 (Hi)		(United States) White Sands LC-35		(United States) NRL	
16 June; 09:00		NRL	Suborbital	UV astronomy	16 June	Successful
16 June; 09:00	Apogee: 127 kilometres (79 mi)					
17 June; 01:01	(United States) Nike-Cajun		(United States) Kwajalein		(United States) US Navy	
17 June; 01:01		Michigan	Suborbital	Aeronomy	17 June	Successful
17 June; 01:01	Apogee: 140 kilometres (87 mi)					
17 June; 04:00:31	(Soviet Union) UR-200		(Soviet Union) Baikonur Site 90/19		(Soviet Union) RVSN	
17 June; 04:00:31		RVSN	Suborbital	Missile test	17 June	Successful
17 June; 04:00:31	Apogee: 694 kilometres (431 mi)					
17 June	(France) Emeraude VE121		(Algeria) Hammaguira Brigitte		(France) CNES	
17 June		CNES	Suborbital	Missile test	17 June	Launch failure
18 June; 02:19	(United States) Nike-Cajun		(United States) Kwajalein		(United States) US Navy	
18 June; 02:19		Michigan	Suborbital	Aeronomy	18 June	Successful
18 June; 02:19	Apogee: 149 kilometres (93 mi)					
18 June; 14:56:13	(United States) SM-65D Atlas		(United States) Vandenberg LC-576A-1		(United States) Strategic Air Command	
18 June; 14:56:13		AFCRL	Suborbital	REV Test	18 June	Successful
18 June; 14:56:13	Apogee: 1,800 kilometres (1,100 mi)					
18 June; 16:30	(United States) Nike-Cajun		(United States) Kwajalein		(United States) US Navy	
18 June; 16:30		Michigan	Suborbital	Aeronomy	18 June	Successful
18 June; 16:30	Apogee: 148 kilometres (92 mi)					
19 June; 01:29	(United States) Nike-Cajun		(United States) Kwajalein		(United States) US Navy	
19 June; 01:29		US Navy	Suborbital	Aeronomy	19 June	Successful
19 June; 01:29	Apogee: 100 kilometres (62 mi)					
19 June; 13:46	(United States) Aerobee-150 (Hi)		(United States) White Sands LC-35		(United States) KPNO	
19 June; 13:46		KPNO	Suborbital	Aeronomy	19 June	Successful
19 June; 13:46	Apogee: 124 kilometres (77 mi)					
19 June; 15:40	(United States) Nike-Cajun		(United States) Kwajalein		(United States) US Navy	
19 June; 15:40		US Navy	Suborbital	Aeronomy	19 June	Successful
19 June; 15:40	Apogee: 100 kilometres (62 mi)					
22 June	(Soviet Union) R-14 Usovaya		(Soviet Union) Kapustin Yar		(Soviet Union) RVSN	
22 June		RVSN	Suborbital	Missile test	22 June	Successful
22 June	Apogee: 675 kilometres (419 mi)					
23 June; 18:16:03	(United States) UGM-27 Polaris A2		(United States) USS John Adams (SSBN-620), ETR		(United States) US Navy	
23 June; 18:16:03		US Navy	Suborbital	Missile test	23 June	Successful
23 June; 18:16:03	Apogee: 1,000 kilometres (620 mi)					
23 June; 19:53:03	(United States) UGM-27 Polaris A2		(United States) USS John Adams, ETR		(United States) US Navy	
23 June; 19:53:03		US Navy	Suborbital	Missile test	23 June	Successful
23 June; 19:53:03	Apogee: 1,000 kilometres (620 mi)					
23 June; 21:31:02	(United States) UGM-27 Polaris A2		(United States) USS John Adams, ETR		(United States) US Navy	
23 June; 21:31:02		US Navy	Suborbital	Missile test	23 June	Successful
23 June; 21:31:02	Apogee: 1,000 kilometres (620 mi)					
24 June; 04:42:27	(Soviet Union) R-36		(Soviet Union) Baikonur Site 67/22		(Soviet Union) RVSN	
24 June; 04:42:27		RVSN	Suborbital	Missile test	24 June	Successful
24 June; 04:42:27	Apogee: 874 kilometres (543 mi)					
24 June; 20:34	(Canada) Black Brant IVA		(Canada) Fort Churchill		(Canada) CARDE	
24 June; 20:34		CBA	Suborbital	Test flight	24 June	Launch failure
24 June; 20:34	Apogee: 467 kilometres (290 mi)					
25 June; 14:57:39	(United States) Nike-Apache		(United States) Wallops Island		(United States) NASA	
25 June; 14:57:39		NASA	Suborbital	Magnetospheric	25 June	Successful
25 June; 14:57:39	Apogee: 150 kilometres (93 mi)					
26 June; 00:52:30	(United States) Nike-Apache		(United States) Wallops Island		(United States) NASA	
26 June; 00:52:30		NASA	Suborbital	Magnetospheric	26 June	Successful
26 June; 00:52:30	Apogee: 156 kilometres (97 mi)					
29 June; 21:00	(United States) LGM-30B Minuteman IB		(United States) Vandenberg LF-09		(United States) US Air Force	
29 June; 21:00		US Air Force	Suborbital	Missile test	29 June	Successful
29 June; 21:00	Apogee: 1,300 kilometres (810 mi)					
29 June	(United States) Nike-Tomahawk		(United States) Barking Sands		(United States) Sandia	
29 June		Sandia	Suborbital	Aeronomy	29 June	Launch failure
29 June	(China) Dong Feng 2		(China) Jiuquan LA-3		(China) PLA	
29 June		PLA	Suborbital	Missile test	29 June	Successful
29 June	Apogee: 200 kilometres (120 mi)					
30 June; 00:00	(United States) LGM-30A Minuteman IA		(United States) Vandenberg LF-04		(United States) Strategic Air Command	
30 June; 00:00		Strategic Air Command	Suborbital	Missile test	30 June	Successful
30 June; 00:00	Apogee: 1,300 kilometres (810 mi)					
30 June; 22:30:04	(Soviet Union) R-36		(Soviet Union) Baikonur Site 67/22		(Soviet Union) RVSN	
30 June; 22:30:04		RVSN	Suborbital	Missile test	30 June	Successful
30 June; 22:30:04	Apogee: 872 kilometres (542 mi)					
June	(United States) Nike-Apache		(United States) White Sands		(United States) US Army	
June		US Army	Suborbital	Aeronomy	June	Successful
June	Apogee: 100 kilometres (62 mi)					
June	(United States) Nike-Apache		(United States) White Sands		(United States) US Army	
June		US Army	Suborbital	Target	June	Successful
June	Apogee: 100 kilometres (62 mi)					
June	(United States) Nike-Javelin		(United States) White Sands		(United States) DASA	
June		DASA	Suborbital	Aeronomy	June	Successful
June	Apogee: 100 kilometres (62 mi)					
June	(Soviet Union) R-14 Usovaya		(Soviet Union) Kapustin Yar		(Soviet Union) RVSN	
June		RVSN	Suborbital	Missile test	June	Successful
June	Apogee: 675 kilometres (419 mi)					

- ← Jan
- Feb
- Mar
- Apr
- May
- Jun
- Jul
- Aug
- Sep
- Oct
- Nov
- Dec →
