= Kosmos 19 =

Soviet radar tracking satellite

- Mission type: ABM radar target Technology
- COSPAR ID: 1963-033A
- SATCAT no.: 00632
- Mission duration: 237 days

Spacecraft properties
- Spacecraft type: DS-P1
- Manufacturer: Yuzhnoye
- Launch mass: 355 kg

Start of mission
- Launch date: 6 August 1963; 06:00:00 GMT
- Rocket: Kosmos-2I 63S1
- Launch site: Kapustin Yar, Mayak-2
- Contractor: Yuzhnoye

End of mission
- Decay date: 30 March 1964

Orbital parameters
- Reference system: Geocentric
- Regime: Low Earth
- Perigee altitude: 267 km
- Apogee altitude: 487 km
- Inclination: 49.0°
- Period: 92.2 minutes
- Epoch: 6 August 1963

Kosmos 19 (Russian: Космос 19 meaning Cosmos 19), also known as DS-P1 No.3 was a prototype radar target satellite for anti-ballistic missile tests, which was launched by the Soviet Union in 1963 as part of the Dnepropetrovsk Sputnik programme. Its primary mission was to demonstrate the necessary technologies for radar tracking of spacecraft, which would allow future satellites to function as targets.

== Spacecraft ==
It had a mass of 355 kilograms (783 lb). Its primary mission was to demonstrate the necessary technologies for radar tracking of spacecraft, which would allow future satellites to function as targets. It was a solar-powered satellite manufactured by Yuzhnoye.

== Mission ==
It was launched aboard a Kosmos-2I 63S1 rocket, from Mayak-2 at Kapustin Yar. The launch occurred at 06:00:00 GMT on 6 August 1963. Kosmos 19 was placed into a low Earth orbit with a perigee of 267 kilometres (166 mi), an apogee of 487 kilometres (303 mi), an inclination of 49.0°, and an orbital period of 92.2 minutes. It decayed from orbit on 30 March 1964.

Kosmos 19 was a prototype DS-P1 satellite, the third of four to be launched. It was preceded by the successful launch of Kosmos 6 on 30 June 1962, and a launch failure on 6 April 1963, and will be succeeded by Kosmos 25, which will be launched on 27 February 1964.

== See also ==
- 1963 in spaceflight
