= Kosmos 51 =

Soviet technology demonstration satellite

- Mission type: Technology; Cosmic ray
- Operator: VNIIEM
- COSPAR ID: 1964-080A
- SATCAT no.: 00947
- Mission duration: 340 days

Spacecraft properties
- Spacecraft type: DS-MT
- Manufacturer: Yuzhnoye
- Launch mass: 350 kg

Start of mission
- Launch date: 9 December 1964; 23:02:00 GMT
- Rocket: Kosmos 63S1
- Launch site: Kapustin Yar, Site 86/1
- Contractor: Yuzhnoye

End of mission
- Decay date: 14 November 1965

Orbital parameters
- Reference system: Geocentric
- Regime: Low Earth
- Perigee altitude: 262 km
- Apogee altitude: 533 km
- Inclination: 48.8°
- Period: 92.5 minutes
- Epoch: 9 December 1964

Kosmos 51 (Russian: Космос 51 meaning Cosmos 51), also known as DS-MT No.3 was a technology demonstration satellite which was launched by the Soviet Union in 1964 as part of the Dnepropetrovsk Sputnik programme. Its primary mission was to demonstrate an electric gyrodyne orientation system. It also carried a scientific research package as a secondary payload, which was used to study cosmic rays and the luminosity of the stellar background.

It was launched aboard a Kosmos 63S1 rocket from Site 86/1 at Kapustin Yar. The launch occurred at 23:02 GMT on 9 December 1964.

Kosmos 51 was placed into a low Earth orbit with a perigee of 262 kilometres (163 mi), an apogee of 533 kilometres (331 mi), 48.8° of inclination, and an orbital period of 92.5 minutes. It decayed from orbit on 14 November 1965. Kosmos 51 was the last of three DS-MT satellites to be launched. The first was lost in a launch failure on 1 June 1963, and the second was launched as Kosmos 31 on 6 June 1964.

== See also ==
- 1964 in spaceflight
