= Kosmos 31 =

Soviet technology demonstration satellite

- Mission type: Technology; Cosmic ray
- Operator: VNIIEM
- COSPAR ID: 1964-028A
- SATCAT no.: 00803
- Mission duration: 136 days

Spacecraft properties
- Spacecraft type: DS-MT
- Manufacturer: Yuzhnoye
- Launch mass: 325 kg

Start of mission
- Launch date: 6 June 1964, 06:00:00 GMT
- Rocket: Kosmos-2I 63S1
- Launch site: Kapustin Yar, Mayak-2

End of mission
- Decay date: 20 October 1964

Orbital parameters
- Reference system: Geocentric
- Regime: Low Earth
- Perigee altitude: 222 km
- Apogee altitude: 492 km
- Inclination: 49.0°
- Period: 91.6 minutes
- Epoch: 6 juin 1964

Kosmos 31 (Russian: Космос 31 meaning Cosmos 31), also known as DS-MT No.2 was a technology demonstration satellite which was launched by the Soviet Union in 1964 as part of the Dnepropetrovsk Sputnik programme. Its primary mission was to demonstrate an electric gyrodyne orientation system. It also carried a scientific research package as a secondary payload, which was used to study cosmic rays.

It was launched aboard a Kosmos-2I 63S1 rocket from Mayak-2 at Kapustin Yar. The launch occurred at 06:00 GMT on 6 June 1964.

Kosmos 31 was placed into a low Earth orbit with a perigee of 222 kilometres (138 mi), an apogee of 492 kilometres (306 mi), 49.0° of inclination, and an orbital period of 91.6 minutes. It decayed from orbit on 20 October 1964. Kosmos 31 was the second of three DS-MT satellites to be launched. The first, DS-MT No.1, was lost in a launch failure on 1 June 1963, and the third is Kosmos 51, which was launched on 9 December 1964.

== See also ==
- 1964 in spaceflight
