= Kosmos 6 =

Soviet radar target satellite

- Mission type: ABM radar target Technology
- Harvard designation: 1962 Alpha Delta 1
- COSPAR ID: 1962-028A
- SATCAT no.: 00338
- Mission duration: 39 days

Spacecraft properties
- Spacecraft type: DS-P1
- Manufacturer: Yuzhnoye
- Launch mass: 355 kg

Start of mission
- Launch date: 30 June 1962, 16:00:00 GMT
- Rocket: Kosmos-2I 63S1
- Launch site: Kapustin Yar, Mayak-2
- Contractor: Yuzhnoye

End of mission
- Decay date: 8 August 1962

Orbital parameters
- Reference system: Geocentric
- Regime: Low Earth
- Perigee altitude: 264 km
- Apogee altitude: 344 km
- Inclination: 49.0°
- Period: 90.6 minutes
- Epoch: 30 June 1962

Kosmos 6 (Russian: Космос 6 meaning Cosmos 6), also known as DS-P1 No.1 as part of the Dnepropetrovsk Sputnik programme and occasionally in the West as Sputnik 16 was a prototype radar target satellite for anti-ballistic missile tests, which was launched by the Soviet Union in 1962.

== Spacecraft ==
It was the sixth satellite to be designated under the Kosmos system, and the second spacecraft launched as part of the DS programme to successfully reach orbit, after Kosmos 1. It had a mass of 355 kilograms (783 lb). Its primary mission was to demonstrate the necessary technologies for radar tracking of spacecraft, which would allow future satellites to function as targets. It was the first solar-powered satellite manufactured by Yuzhnoye.

== Mission ==
It was launched aboard the seventh flight of the Kosmos-2I 63S1 rocket. The launch was conducted from Mayak-2 at Kapustin Yar, and occurred at 16:00:00 GMT on 30 June 1962. Kosmos 6 was placed into a low Earth orbit with a perigee of 264 kilometres (164 mi), an apogee of 344 kilometres (214 mi), an inclination of 49.0°, and an orbital period of 90.6 minutes. It decayed on 8 August 1962.

Kosmos 6 was a prototype DS-P1 satellite, the first of four to be launched. Of the other three satellites, one was lost in a launch failure on 6 April 1963, and the remaining two successfully reached orbit as Kosmos 19 and Kosmos 25.

== See also ==
- 1962 in spaceflight
