= Kosmos 36 =

Societ anti-ballistic missile target satellite

- Mission type: ABM radar target
- COSPAR ID: 1964-042A
- SATCAT no.: 00844
- Mission duration: 213 days

Spacecraft properties
- Spacecraft type: DS-P1-Yu
- Manufacturer: Yuzhnoye
- Launch mass: 325 kg

Start of mission
- Launch date: 30 July 1964, 03:36:00 GMT
- Rocket: Kosmos-2I 63S1
- Launch site: Kapustin Yar, Mayak-2
- Contractor: Yuzhnoye

End of mission
- Decay date: 28 February 1965

Orbital parameters
- Reference system: Geocentric
- Regime: Low Earth
- Perigee altitude: 261 km
- Apogee altitude: 477 km
- Inclination: 49.0°
- Period: 91.9 minutes
- Epoch: 30 July 1964

Kosmos 36 (Russian: Космос 36 meaning Cosmos 36), also known as DS-P1-Yu #1, was a satellite which was used for use in calibrating the Dnestr space surveillance and as a radar calibration target, for tests of anti-ballistic missiles. It was launched by the Soviet Union in 1964 as part of the Dnepropetrovsk Sputnik programme. It was built by the Yuzhnoye Design Bureau.

Kosmos 36 was launched using a Kosmos-2I 63S1 carrier rocket, which flew from Mayak-2 at Kapustin Yar. The launch occurred at 03:36 GMT on 30 July 1964.

After separating from its carrier rocket, Kosmos 36 was in a low Earth orbit with a perigee of 261 kilometres (162 mi), an apogee of 477 kilometres (296 mi), 49.0° of inclination, and an orbital period of 91.9 minutes. It decayed from orbit on 28 February 1965. Kosmos 36 was the first of seventy nine DS-P1-Yu satellites to be launched, of which all but seven were successful. The next launch of a DS-P1-Yu satellite, the DS-P1-Yu #2 will be on 12 February 1965, failed due to a second stage malfunction.

== See also ==
- 1964 in spaceflight
