= 1963 in spaceflight =

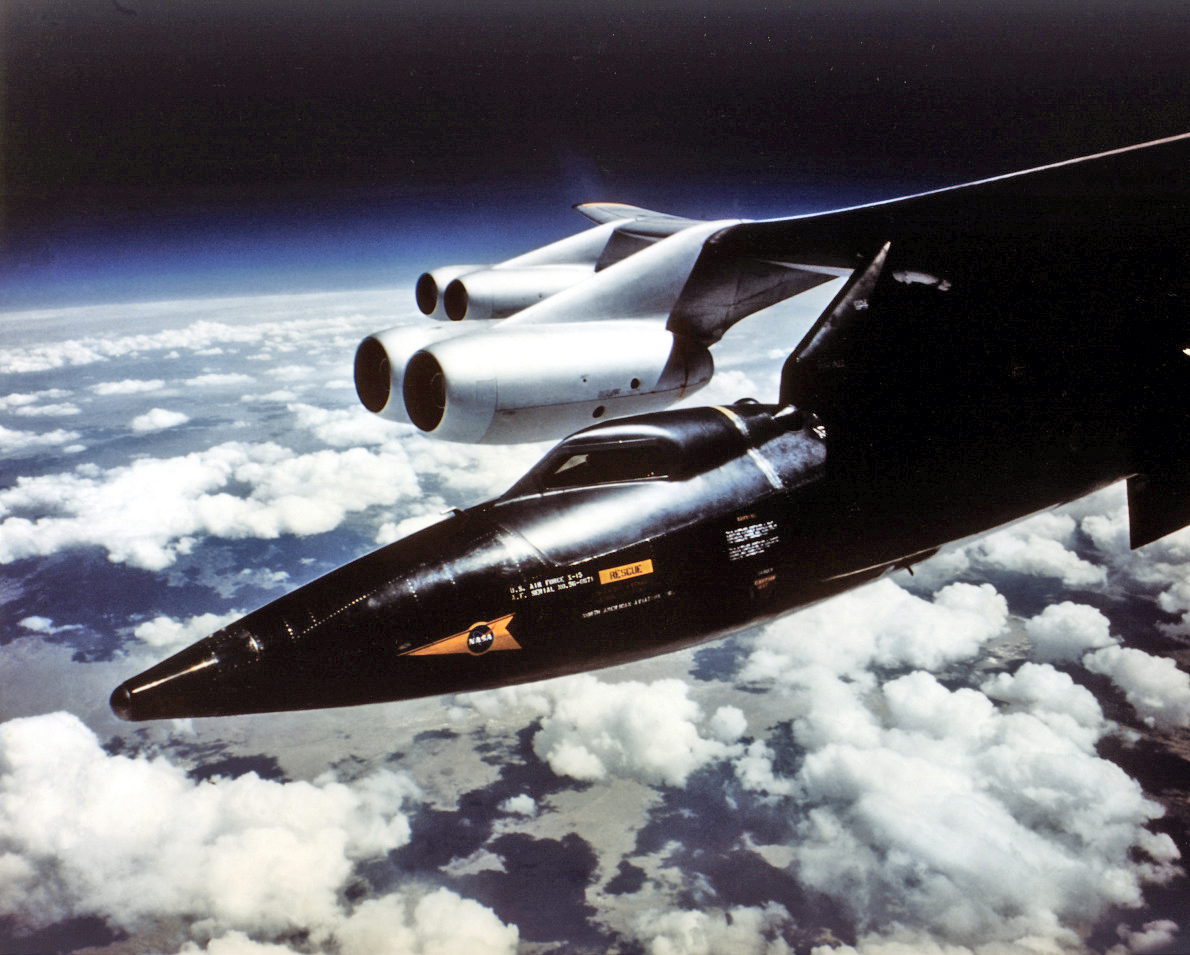
- A North American X-15 made two suborbital flights in July and August, becoming the first reusable spacecraft

Orbital launches
- First: 4 January
- Last: 21 December
- Total: 70
- Successes: 50
- Failures: 17
- Partial failures: 3
- Catalogued: 55

Rockets
- Maiden flights: Atlas LV-3A Agena-D; Atlas LV-3C Centaur-B; Polyot 11A59; Scout X-2B; Scout X-3M; Scout X-4; Thor DSV-2A Ablestar; TAT SLV-2A Agena-B; TAT SLV-2A Agena-D; Voskhod 11A57
- Retirements: Atlas LV-3B; Atlas LV-3C Centaur-B; Scout X-2B; Scout X-2M; Scout X-3M; Sergeant-Delta

Crewed flights
- Orbital: 3
- Suborbital: 2
- Total travellers: 4

1963 in spaceflight

- ← Jan
- Feb
- Mar
- Apr
- May
- Jun
- Jul
- Aug
- Sep
- Oct
- Nov
- Dec →

== Deep space rendezvous ==
Date (GMT)	Spacecraft	Event	Remarks
5 April	Luna 4	Flyby of the Moon	Failed lander, closest approach: 8,336 kilometres (5,180 mi)
19 June	Mars 1	First flyby of Mars	Closest approach: 193,000 kilometres (120,000 mi), communications system failed before flyby

== Notable creations of orbital debris ==
Date/Time (UTC)	Source object	Event type	Pieces tracked	Remarks
9 May	Westford-2	Communications experiment	46	As part of an experiment to facilitate international telecommunications, the US Military deployed an artificial space ring consisting of hundreds of millions of tiny copper needles which would act as antennas reflecting radio signals at the target wavelength of 8 GHz. A large proportion of the needles were not dispersed properly and remained stuck in clumps that were discovered and tracked by the SSN between 1966 and 1991. As of October 2013, 46 of the 144 detected debris clumps remain in orbit. The needles that were properly dispersed are believed to have decayed. This event prompted international protests and influenced the drafting of the 1967 Outer Space Treaty.

== Orbital launch statistics ==
=== By country ===
Country	Launches	Successes	Failures	Partial failures
Soviet Union	24	15	9	0
United States	46	35	8	3
World	70	50	17	3

=== By rocket ===
Rocket	Country	Launches	Successes	Failures	Partial failures	Remarks
Atlas LV-3A Agena-B	United States	3	1	1	1	
Atlas LV-3A Agena-D	United States	5	5	0	0	Maiden flight
Atlas LV-3B	United States	1	1	0	0	Retired
Atlas LV-3C Centaur-B	United States	1	1	0	0	Only flight
Delta B	United States	6	6	0	0	
Delta C	United States	1	1	0	0	
Kosmos-2I 63S1	Soviet Union	8	4	4	0	
Molniya 8K78	Soviet Union	1	0	1	0	
Molniya-L 8K78L	Soviet Union	3	1	2	0	Maiden flight
Polyot 11A59	Soviet Union	1	1	0	0	Maiden flight
Scout X-2B	United States	1	0	1	0	Only flight
Scout X-2M	United States	1	0	1	0	Retired
Scout X-3	United States	2	0	1	1	
Scout X-3M	United States	1	1	0	0	Only flight
Scout X-4	United States	2	1	0	1	Maiden flight
Thor DSV-2A Ablestar	United States	2	2	0	0	Maiden flight
Thor DM-21 Agena-B	United States	1	1	0	0	
Thor SLV-2 Agena-D (Thor DM-21 Agena-D)	United States	8	6	2	0	Redesignated midyear
Thrust Augmented Thor SLV-2A Agena-B	United States	1	1	0	0	Maiden flight
Thrust Augmented Thor SLV-2A Agena-D	United States	10	8	2	0	Maiden flight
Voskhod 11A57	Soviet Union	1	1	0	0	Maiden flight
Vostok-K 8K72K	Soviet Union	2	2	0	0	
Vostok-2 8A92	Soviet Union	8	6	2	0	

=== By orbit ===
Orbital regime	Launches	Achieved	Not Achieved	Accidentally Achieved	Remarks
Low Earth	57	44	13	2	
Medium Earth	5	4	1	0	
High Earth	5	3	2	0	Including Highly elliptical orbits
Geosynchronous/transfer	2	2	0	0	
Heliocentric	1	0	1	0	
