= 1964 in spaceflight =

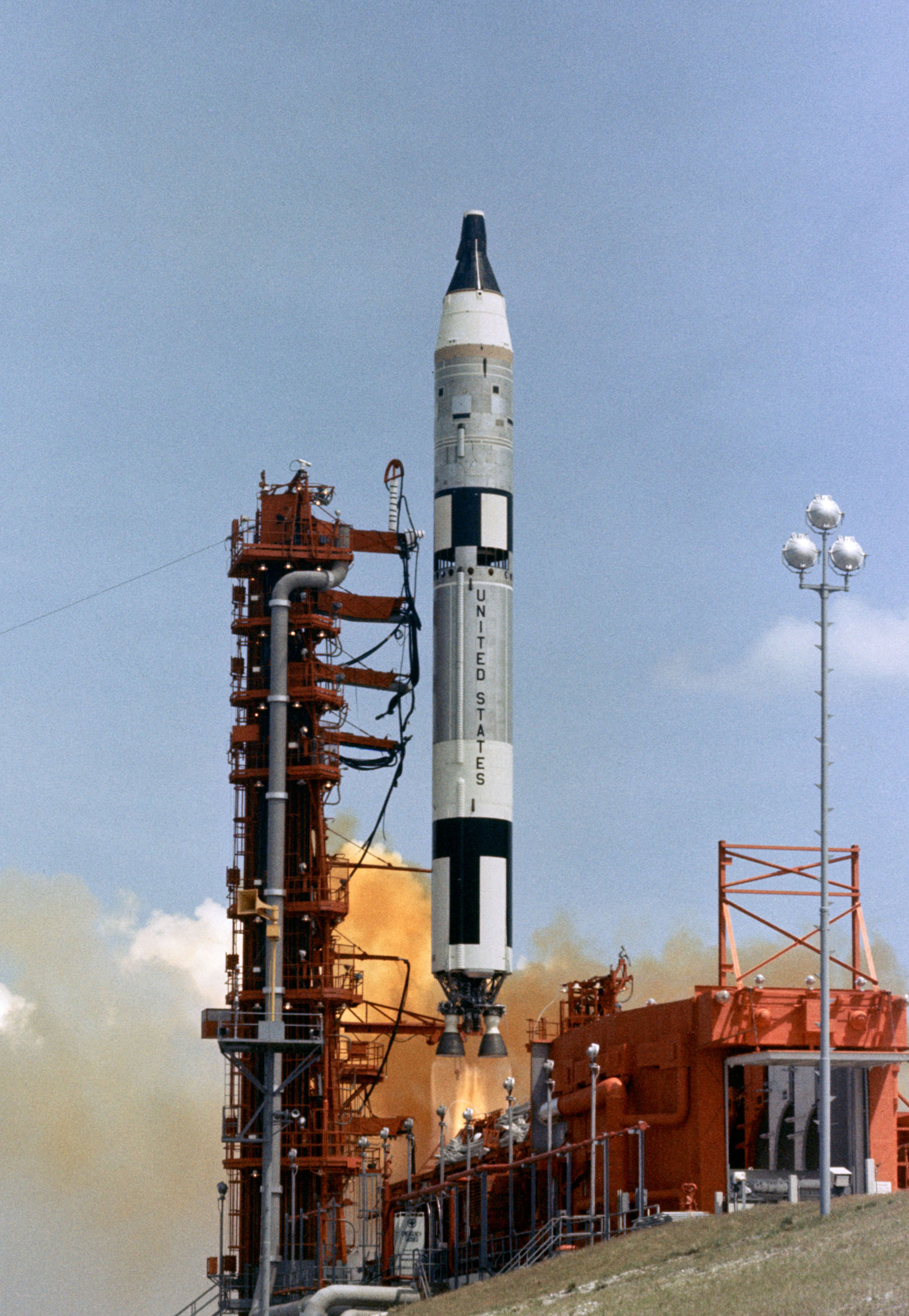
- The launch of Gemini 1, the first flight of the Titan II GLV rocket and the Gemini programme

Orbital launches
- First: 11 January
- Last: 21 December
- Total: 101
- Successes: 83
- Failures: 15
- Partial failures: 3
- Catalogued: 87

National firsts
- Satellite: Italy

Rockets
- Maiden flights: Atlas SLV-3 Agena-D; Atlas LV-3C Centaur-C; Delta D Kosmos-1 63S3; Molniya-M 8K78M; Titan II GLV; Titan IIIA; Vostok-2M 8A92M
- Retirements: Delta B Scout X-3; Polyot 11A59; Vostok-K 8K72K

Crewed flights
- Orbital: 1
- Total travellers: 3

1964 in spaceflight

- ← Jan
- Feb
- Mar
- Apr
- May
- Jun
- Jul
- Aug
- Sep
- Oct
- Nov
- Dec →

== Deep Space Rendezvous ==
Date (UTC)	Spacecraft	Event	Remarks
2 February	Ranger 6	Lunar impact	Impacted Mare Tranquillitatis at 09:24:32, failed to return images
14 July	Zond 1	Flyby of Venus	Closest approach: 100,000 kilometres (62,000 mi), communications system failed before flyby
31 July	Ranger 7	Lunar impact	Impacted Mare Nubium at 13:25:49, returned 4,308 images

== Orbital launch statistics ==
=== By country ===
Country	Launches	Successes	Failures	Partial failures
Soviet Union	36	29	7	0
United States	64	53	8	3
World	100	82	15	3

=== By rocket ===
Rocket	Country	Launches	Successes	Failures	Partial failures	Remarks
Atlas LV-3A Agena-B	United States	3	3	0	0	
Atlas LV-3A Agena-D	United States	9	8	1	0	
Atlas SLV-3 Agena-D	United States	4	3	1	0	Maiden flight
Atlas LV-3C Centaur-C	United States	2	0	1	1	Maiden flight
Delta B	United States	2	1	1	0	Retired
Delta C	United States	2	1	0	1	
Delta D	United States	1	1	0	0	Maiden flight
Kosmos-1 63S3	Soviet Union	2	1	1	0	Maiden flight
Kosmos-2I 63S1	Soviet Union	8	7	1	0	
Molniya 8K78	Soviet Union	3	2	1	0	
Molniya-M 8K78M	Soviet Union	5	1	4	0	Maiden flight
Polyot 11A59	Soviet Union	1	1	0	0	Retired
Saturn I	United States	3	3	0	0	First orbital launch
Scout X-3	United States	1	1	0	0	Retired
Scout X-4	United States	7	6	1	0	
Scout X-4	Italy	1	1	0	0	First Italian satellite launch
Thor DSV-2A Ablestar	United States	3	2	1	0	
Thor SLV-2 Agena-B	United States	2	1	0	1	
Thor SLV-2 Agena-D	United States	2	2	0	0	
Thrust Augmented Thor SLV-2A Agena-D	United States	20	19	1	0	
Titan II GLV	United States	1	1	0	0	Maiden flight
Titan IIIA	United States	2	1	1	0	Maiden flight
Voskhod 11A57	Soviet Union	5	5	0	0	
Vostok-K 8K72K	Soviet Union	2	2	0	0	Retired
Vostok-2 8A92	Soviet Union	9	9	0	0	
Vostok-2M 8A92M	Soviet Union	1	1	0	0	Maiden flight

=== By orbit ===
Orbital regime	Launches	Achieved	Not Achieved	Accidentally Achieved	Remarks
Low Earth	77	68	8	2	
Medium Earth	4	3	1	0	
High Earth	11	8	3	0	Including Highly elliptical orbits
Geosynchronous/transfer	2	1	1	0	
Heliocentric	6	4	2	0	
