= 1967 in spaceflight =

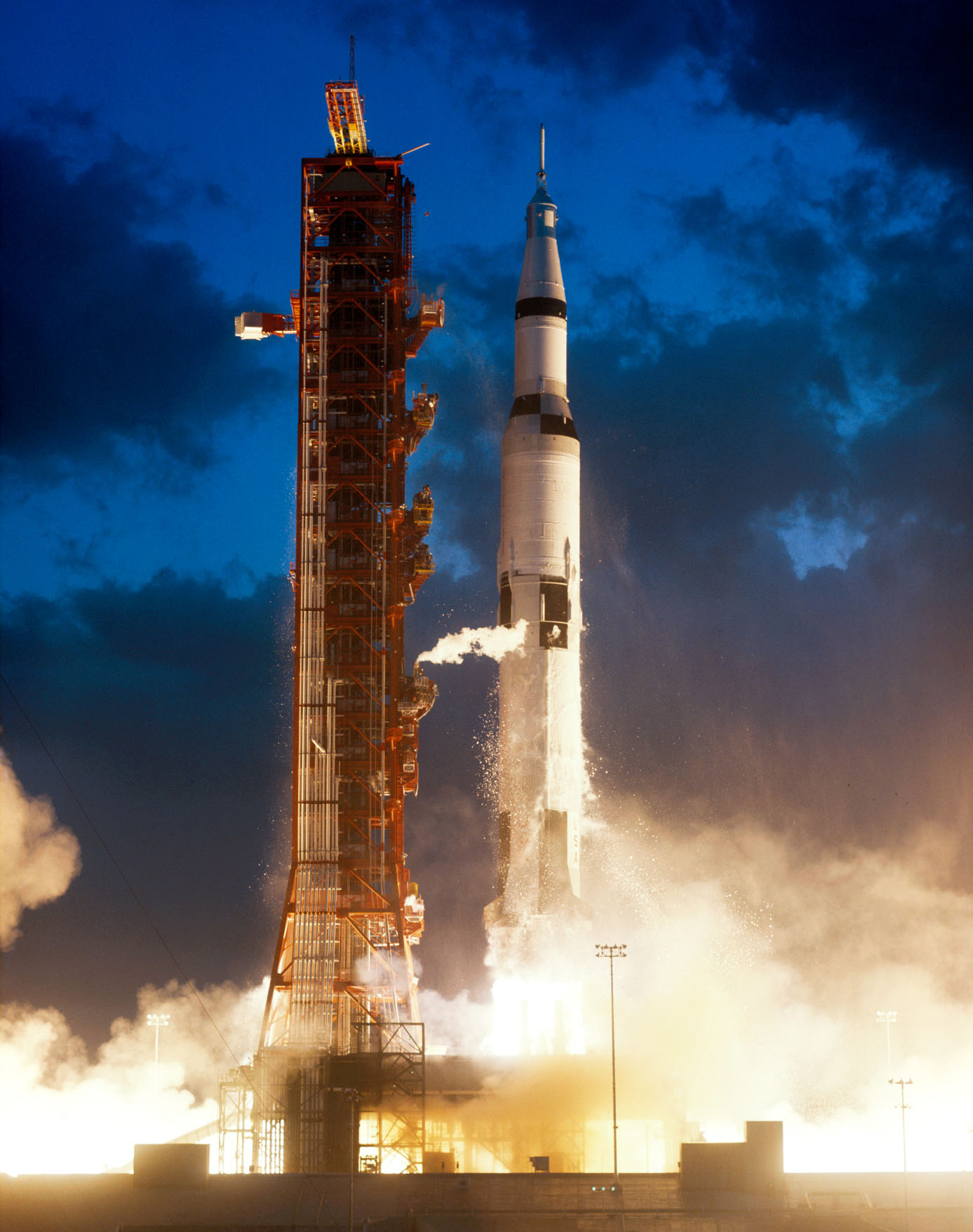
- Apollo 4, the first flight of the Saturn V rocket lifts off.

Orbital launches
- First: Intelsat II F-2
- Last: CRL AF17.750D

National firsts
- Satellite: Australia

Rockets
- Maiden flights: (Soviet Union) Proton-K (United States) Saturn V
- Retirements: (Soviet Union) Kosmos (63S1) (United States) Redstone Sparta

1967 in spaceflight

The year 1967 in spaceflight saw the most orbital launches of the 20th century and more than any other year until 2021, including that of the first Australian satellite, WRESAT, which was launched from the Woomera Test Range atop an American Sparta rocket. The United States National Space Science Data Center catalogued 172 spacecraft placed into orbit by launches which occurred in 1967.

The year saw both setbacks and advances for the United States Apollo programme. Three astronauts; Virgil "Gus" Grissom, Ed White and Roger B. Chaffee, were killed in a fire aboard the AS-204 spacecraft at Cape Kennedy Launch Complex 34 on 27 January whilst rehearsing the launch. On 20 October the Saturn V rocket made its maiden flight.

== Orbital Launches ==
- ← Jan
- Feb
- Mar
- Apr
- May
- Jun
- Jul
- Aug
- Sep
- Oct
- Nov
- Dec →

=== January ===
January launches
Date and time (UTC)	Rocket	Flight number	Launch site		LSP	
Date and time (UTC)	Payload	Operator	Orbit	Function	Decay (UTC)	Outcome
Date and time (UTC)	Remarks					
11 January; 10:55	(United States) Delta E1		(United States) LC-17, Cape Canaveral			
11 January; 10:55	(United Nations) Intelsat II F-2 (Canary Bird)	Intelsat	Geosynchronous	Communications	In orbit	Successful
14 January; 21:28	(United States) Thor-Agena D		(United States) SLC-2W, Vandenberg AFB			
14 January; 21:28	(United States) OPS 1664 KH-4A 1038	CIA	Low Earth Orbit	Reconnaissance	2 February 1967	Successful
18 January; 14:19	(United States) Titan IIIC		(United States) SLC-41, Cape Canaveral			
18 January; 14:19	(United States) IDCSP 8	US Air Force	Geosynchronous	Communications	In orbit	Successful
18 January; 14:19	(United States) IDCSP 9	US Air Force	Geosynchronous	Communications	In orbit	Successful
18 January; 14:19	(United States) IDCSP 10	US Air Force	Geosynchronous	Communications	In orbit	Successful
18 January; 14:19	(United States) IDCSP 11	US Air Force	Geosynchronous	Communications	In orbit	Successful
18 January; 14:19	(United States) IDCSP 12	US Air Force	Geosynchronous	Communications	In orbit	Successful
18 January; 14:19	(United States) IDCSP 13	US Air Force	Geosynchronous	Communications	In orbit	Successful
18 January; 14:19	(United States) IDCSP 14	US Air Force	Geosynchronous	Communications	In orbit	Successful
18 January; 14:19	(United States) IDCSP 15	US Air Force	Geosynchronous	Communications	In orbit	Successful
19 January; 12:39	(Soviet Union) Vostok-2		(Soviet Union) Pu-41/1, Plesetsk			
19 January; 12:39	(Soviet Union) Kosmos 138 (Zenit-2 #45)	GRU	Low Earth Orbit	Reconnaissance	27 January 1967	Successful
25 January; 13:55	(Soviet Union) R-36ORB		(Soviet Union) Pad 164/36, Baikonur			
25 January; 13:55	(Soviet Union) Kosmos 139 (OGCh #7)		Low Earth Orbit	Weapon System Test	27 January 1967	Successful
26 January; 17:31	(United States) Delta E		(United States) SLC-2E, Vandenberg AFB			
26 January; 17:31	(United States) ESSA-4	ESSA	Sun-Synchronous Orbit	Meteorology	In orbit	Successful
31 January; 12:45	(United States) Scout B		(United States) SLC-5, Vandenberg AFB		US Air Force	
31 January; 12:45	(United States) OV3-5	US Air Force	Low Earth orbit	Magnetosphere research satellite	31 January	Failure

=== February ===
February launches
Date and time (UTC)	Rocket	Flight number	Launch site		LSP	
Date and time (UTC)	Payload	Operator	Orbit	Function	Decay (UTC)	Outcome
Date and time (UTC)	Remarks					
2 February; 20:00	(United States) Atlas-Agena D		(United States) SLC-2E, Vandenberg AFB		US Air Force	
2 February; 20:00	(United States) OPS 4399 KH-7 4036	US Air Force	Low Earth orbit	Optical Reconnaissance	12 February	Successful
5 February; 01:17	(United States) Atlas-Agena D		(United States) LC-13, Cape Canaveral		NASA	
5 February; 01:17	(United States) Lunar Orbiter 3	NASA	Low Lunar Orbit	Lunar surface mapping	9 October	Successful
7 February; 03:20	(Soviet Union) Soyuz		(Soviet Union) Pad 1/5 (Gagarin's Start), Baikonur			
7 February; 03:20	(Soviet Union) Kosmos 140 (Soyuz 7K-OK 1)	MOM	Low Earth Orbit	Uncrewed Test Flight	9 February	Successful
8 February; 08:00	(United States) Thor-Burner 2		(United States) SLC-10W, Vandenberg AFB		US Air Force	
8 February; 08:00	(United States) DMSP-4A F2	US Air Force	Sun-Synchronous Orbit	Meteorology	In orbit	Successful
8 February; 09:39	(France) Diamant-A		(Algeria) Hammaguir		CNES	
8 February; 09:39	(France) Diadème 1	CNES	Low Earth Orbit	Geodesy	In orbit	Partial Failure
8 February; 09:39	The third stage underperformed, lower orbit than planned					
8 February; 10:19	(Soviet Union) Voskhod		(Soviet Union) Pad 41/1, Baikonur			
8 February; 10:19	(Soviet Union) Kosmos 141 (Zenit-4 #26)	GRU	Low Earth Orbit	Optical reconnaissance	16 February	Successful
14 February; 10:04	(Soviet Union) Kosmos-2		(Soviet Union) Pad 86/1, Kapustin Yar			
14 February; 10:04	(Soviet Union) Kosmos 142 (DS-U2-I #2)	Yuzhnoye Design Bureau	Low Earth Orbit	Ionosphere Research	6 July	Successful
15 February; 10:06	(France) Diamant-A		(Algeria) Hammaguir		CNES	
15 February; 10:06	(France) Diadème 2	CNES	Low Earth Orbit	Geodesy	In orbit	Successful
22 February; 22:02	(United States) Thor SLV-2A Agena-D		(United States) SLC-2W, Vandenberg AFB		US Air Force	
22 February; 22:02	(United States) OPS 4750 KH-4A 1039	US Air Force	Low Earth orbit	Optical Reconnaissance	11 March	Successful
24 February; 19:59	(United States) Titan IIIB Agena-D		(United States) SLC-4W, Vandenberg AFB		US Air Force	
24 February; 19:59	(United States) OPS 4204 KH-8 4304	US Air Force	Low Earth orbit	Optical Reconnaissance	6 March	Successful
27 February; 08:45	(Soviet Union) Vostok-2		(Soviet Union) Pad 1/5, Baikonur			
27 February; 08:45	(Soviet Union) Kosmos 143 (Zenit-2 #46)	GRU	Low Earth Orbit	Optical reconnaissance	7 March	Partial Failure
28 February; 14:34	(Soviet Union) Vostok-2M		(Soviet Union) Pad 41/1, Plesetsk			
28 February; 14:34	(Soviet Union) Kosmos 144 (Meteor-1 #6)		Low Earth Orbit	Meteorology	14 September 1982	Successful

=== March ===
March launches
Date and time (UTC)	Rocket	Flight number	Launch site		LSP	
Date and time (UTC)	Payload	Operator	Orbit	Function	Decay (UTC)	Outcome
Date and time (UTC)	Remarks					
3 March; 06:44:58	(Soviet Union) Kosmos-2		(Soviet Union) Kapustin Yar LC-86/1		(Soviet Union)	
3 March; 06:44:58	(Soviet Union) Kosmos 145 (DS-U2 M #2)		Low Earth	Atomic clock test	8 March 1968	Successful
8 March; 16:12:00	(United States) Delta C		(United States) Cape Canaveral LC-17B		(United States) NASA	
8 March; 16:12:00	(United States) OSO-3	NASA	Low Earth	Solar research	4 April 1982	Successful
8 March; 16:12:00	The spacecraft performed normally until the second onboard tape recorder failed in July 1968. The spacecraft was put in standby condition on 10 November 1969, and became inoperable shortly thereafter.					
10 March; 11:30	(Soviet Union) Proton-K / Blok D		(Soviet Union) Pad 81/23, Baikonur		MOM	
10 March; 11:30	(Soviet Union) Kosmos 146 (L1P 2)	MOM	Low Earth orbit	Test prototype Soyuz 7K-L1P	18 March	Successful
10 March; 11:30	Maiden flight of the Proton 8K82K (Proton-K).					
13 March; 12:10:23	(Soviet Union) Vostok-2		(Soviet Union) Pu-41/1, Plesetsk			
13 March; 12:10:23	(Soviet Union) Kosmos 147 (Zenit-2 #47)	GRU	Low Earth Orbit	Reconnaissance	21 March	Successful
16 March; 17:30	(Soviet Union) Kosmos-2		(Soviet Union) Site 133/1, Plesetsk			
16 March; 17:30	(Soviet Union) Kosmos 148 (DS-P1-1 #2)		Low Earth Orbit	Radar calibration	7 May	Successful
21 March; 10:07	(Soviet Union) Kosmos-2I 63SM		(Soviet Union) Site 86/1 Kapustin Yar		Yuzhnoye Design Bureau	
21 March; 10:07	(Soviet Union) Kosmos 149 (DS-MO #1 / Opticheski #1)	Yuzhnoye Design Bureau	Low Earth orbit	Test, geophysical research	7 April	Successful
21 March; 10:07	Aerodynamic skirt stabiliser test					
22 March; 12:44	(Soviet Union) Voskhod		(Soviet Union) Site 41/1, Plesetsk			
22 March; 12:44	(Soviet Union) Kosmos 150 (Zenit-4 #27)	GRU	Low Earth Orbit	Reconnaissance	30 March	Successful
22 March; 14:05	(Soviet Union) R-36-O		(Soviet Union) Site 161/35, Baikonur			
22 March; 14:05	(Soviet Union) OGCh #8		Low Earth Orbit	Weapon System Test	22 March	Failure
22 March; 14:05	Second stage explosion at T+455 seconds					
23 March; 01:30	(United States) Delta E1		(United States) LC-17B, Cape Canaveral			
23 March; 01:30	(United Nations) Intelsat II F3 (Lani Bird)	Intelsat	Geosynchronous	Communications	In orbit	Successful
24 March; 11:50	(Soviet Union) Kosmos-3		(Soviet Union) Site 41/15, Baikonur			
24 March; 11:50	(Soviet Union) Kosmos 151 (Strela-2 #3)		Low Earth Orbit	Military communications	6 May 1991	Successful
25 March; 06:59	(Soviet Union) Kosmos-2		(Soviet Union) Site 133/1, Plesetsk			
25 March; 06:59	(Soviet Union) Kosmos 152 (DS-P1-Yu #7)		Low Earth Orbit	Radar calibration	5 August	Successful
30 March; 18:54	(United States) Thor-SLV-2A Agena-D		(United States) SLC-2W, Vandenberg			
30 March; 18:54	(United States) OPS 4779 (KH-4A 1040)		Low Earth Orbit	Reconnaissance	17 April	Successful

=== April ===
April launches
Date and time (UTC)	Rocket	Flight number	Launch site		LSP	
Date and time (UTC)	Payload	Operator	Orbit	Function	Decay (UTC)	Outcome
Date and time (UTC)	Remarks					
4 April; 14:00	(Soviet Union) Vostok-2		(Soviet Union) Site 41/1, Plesetsk			
4 April; 14:00	(Soviet Union) Kosmos 153 (Zenit-2 #48)	GRU	Low Earth Orbit	Reconnaissance	12 April	Successful
6 April; 03:23	(United States) Atlas-SLV3 Agena-D		(United States) LC-12, Cape Canaveral			
6 April; 03:23	(United States) ATS-2	NASA	Medium Earth orbit (planned); Highly elliptical low Earth orbit (achieved)	Communications/ Meteorology	2 September 1969	Partial failure
6 April; 03:23	(United States) Research Payload Module 481	LANL	Highly elliptical low Earth orbit	Technology Demonstration	29 June 1968	Success
6 April; 03:23	Agena failed to restart, the satellite placed into unplanned highly elliptical orbit. Research Payload Module 481, attached to Agena, tested heat pipes in the space environment					
8 April; 09:00	(Soviet Union) Proton-K / Blok D		(Soviet Union) Pad 81/23, Baikonur		MOM	
8 April; 09:00	(Soviet Union) Kosmos 154 (L1P 3)	MOM	Low Earth orbit	Test prototype Soyuz 7K-L1P	10 April	Partial failure
8 April; 09:00	Block D (4th stage) failed to re-ignite					
12 April; 10:51	(Soviet Union) Voskhod		(Soviet Union) Site 1/5, Baikonur			
12 April; 10:51	(Soviet Union) Kosmos 155 (Zenit-4 #28)	GRU	Low Earth Orbit	Reconnaissance	20 April	Successful
13 April; 02:40	(Japan) Lambda 4S		(Japan) Kagoshima			
13 April; 02:40	(Japan) Ohsumi	ISAS	Low Earth Orbit	Technology demonstration	13 April	Failure
13 April; 02:40	Third attempt to launch the first Japanese satellite. The fourth stage failed to ignite					
14 April; 03:25	(United States) Scout A		(United States) SLC-5, Vandenberg AFB		US Air Force	
14 April; 03:25	OPS 0100 Transit 15	US Navy	Low Earth Orbit	Navigation Satellite	In orbit	Successful
17 April; 07:05	(United States) Atlas-SLV3 Centaur-D	AC-12	(United States) Cape Canaveral LC-36B			
17 April; 07:05	(United States) Surveyor 3	NASA	Translunar injection	Lunar lander	20 April (on the Moon)	Successful
20 April	(United States) Delta E		(United States) Vandenberg SLC-2E			
20 April	(United States) ESSA-5	ESSA	Low Earth Orbit	Meteorology	In orbit	Successful
23 April; 00:35	(Soviet Union) Soyuz		(Soviet Union) Site 1/5, Baikonur		MOM	
23 April; 00:35	(Soviet Union) Soyuz 1	MOM	Low Earth Orbit	Crewed test of Soyuz spacecraft	24 April; 03:22:52	Spacecraft failure
23 April; 00:35	Solar panels jammed, bad weather prevented Soyuz 2 launch, parachute failure during descent resulted in loss of crew					
26 April; 10:06	(United States) Scout B		(Italy) San Marco platform, Formosa Bay, Kenya		CRS	
26 April; 10:06	(Italy) San Marco 2	CRS	Low Earth Orbit	Atmospheric Research	14 October	Successful
26 April	(United States) Titan IIIB Agena-D		(United States) Vandenberg SLC-4W			
26 April	(United States) OPS 4243 KH-8 4305	USAF	Low Earth Orbit	Reconnaissance	26 April	Failure
27 April; 12:50	(Soviet Union) Vostok-2M		(Soviet Union) Site 41/1, Plesetsk			
27 April; 12:50	(Soviet Union) Kosmos 156 (Meteor-1 #7)		Low Earth Orbit	Meteorology	23 October 1989	Successful
28 April; 10:01	(United States) Titan IIIC		(United States) Cape Canaveral LC-41			
28 April; 10:01	(United States) OPS 6638 Vela 7	USAF		Reconnaissance	In orbit	Successful
28 April; 10:01	(United States) OPS 6679 Vela 8	USAF		Reconnaissance	In orbit	Successful
28 April; 10:01	(United States) ERS-18 ORS-4	USAF		Technology Demonstration	In orbit	Successful
28 April; 10:01	(United States) ERS-20 OV5-3	USAF		Technology Demonstration	In orbit	Successful
28 April; 10:01	(United States) ERS-27 OV5-1	USAF		Technology Demonstration	In orbit	Successful

=== May ===
May launches
Date and time (UTC)	Rocket	Flight number	Launch site		LSP	
Date and time (UTC)	Payload	Operator	Orbit	Function	Decay (UTC)	Outcome
Date and time (UTC)	Remarks					
4 May; 22:25	(United States) Atlas-SLV3 Agena-D		(United States) Cape Canaveral LC-13			
4 May; 22:25	(United States) Lunar Orbiter 4	NASA	Selenocentric	Lunar orbiter	6 October	Successful
5 May; 16:00	(United States) Scout A		(United States) SLC-5, Vandenberg AFB		US Air Force	
5 May; 16:00	(United Kingdom) (United States) Ariel 3	UK Science Research Council, NASA	Low Earth Orbit	Atmospheric Research	14 December 1970	Successful
9 May; 21:50	(United States) Thorad-SLV2G Agena-D		(United States) Vandenberg SLC-1E			
9 May; 21:50	(United States) OPS 4696 KH-4A 1041	CIA	Low Earth	Reconnaissance	13 July	Partial failure
9 May; 21:50	(United States) OPS 1967 Fanion 3	USAF	Low Earth	SIGINT	14 March 1993	Successful
9 May; 21:50	Failure of the booster cut-off switch, the satellite went into a highly eccentric orbit					
12 May; 10:30	(Soviet Union) Vostok-2		(Soviet Union) Site 1/5, Baikonur			
12 May; 10:30	(Soviet Union) Kosmos 157 (Zenit-2 #49)	GRU	Low Earth Orbit	Reconnaissance	20 May	Successful
15 May; 11:00	(Soviet Union) Kosmos-3M		(Soviet Union) Site 132/2, Plesetsk			
15 May; 11:00	(Soviet Union) Kosmos 158 (Zaliv-GVM #1)		Low Earth Orbit	Boilerplate	In orbit	Successful
15 May; 11:00	Maiden flight of Kosmos-3M					
16 May; 21:44	(Soviet Union) Molniya-M / Blok L		(Soviet Union) Site 1/5, Baikonur			
16 May; 21:44	(Soviet Union) Kosmos 159 (Ye-6LS No 111)		High Earth orbit (planned); Highly elliptical orbit (achieved)	Test spacecraft	11 November	Partial success
16 May; 21:44	Blok L cut off too early, the spacecraft placed into much lower orbit than planned, planned mission was accomplished					
17 May; 16:05	(Soviet Union) R-36-O		(Soviet Union) Site 41/1, Baikonur			
17 May; 16:05	(Soviet Union) Kosmos 160 (OGCh #9)	RVSN	Low Earth Orbit	FOBS test	18 May	Successful
18 May; 09:05	(United States) Scout A		(United States) SLC-5, Vandenberg AFB		US Air Force	
18 May; 09:05	(United States) OPS 7218 Transit 16	US Navy	Low Earth Orbit	Navigation	In orbit	Successful
22 May; 14:00	(Soviet Union) Voskhod		(Soviet Union) Site 41/1, Plesetsk			
22 May; 14:00	(Soviet Union) Kosmos 161 (Zenit-4 #29)	GRU	Low Earth Orbit	Reconnaissance	30 May	Successful
22 May; 18:30	(United States) Atlas SLV-3 Agena-D		(United States) Vandenberg SLC-4E			
22 May; 18:30	(United States) OPS 4321 KH-7 4037	USAF	Low Earth Orbit	Reconnaissance	30 May	Successful
22 May; 18:30	(United States) OPS 5557 LOGACS	USAF	Low Earth Orbit	Technology Demonstration	27 May	Successful
24 May; 14:05	(United States) Delta E1		(United States) Vandenberg SLC-2E			
24 May; 14:05	(United States) Explorer 34 (IMP F)	NASA	Highly elliptical orbit	Cislunar space research	3 May 1969	Successful
24 May; 22:50	(Soviet Union) Molniya-M		(Soviet Union) Site 1/5, Baikonur			
24 May; 22:50	(Soviet Union) Molniya-1 05		Molniya	Communications	26 November 1971	Successful
30 May; 02:06	(United States) Scout B		(United States) SLC-5, Vandenberg AFB		US Air Force	
30 May; 02:06	(European Union) ESRO 2A	ESRO	Low Earth Orbit	X-Ray Astronomy and Radiation Measurements	30 May	Failure
30 May; 02:06	Third stage Failure					
31 May; 09:30	(United States) Thor DM-21 Agena-D		(United States) Vandenberg SLC-2W			
31 May; 09:30	(United States) Poppy 5A	US Navy		ELINT	In orbit	Successful
31 May; 09:30	(United States) Poppy 5B	US Navy		ELINT	In orbit	Successful
31 May; 09:30	(United States) Poppy 5C	US Navy		ELINT	In orbit	Successful
31 May; 09:30	(United States) Poppy 5D	US Navy		ELINT	In orbit	Successful
31 May; 09:30	(United States) Timation 1	Naval Research Laboratory		Navigation	In orbit	Successful
31 May; 09:30	(United States) Calsphere 3	Naval Research Laboratory		Radar calibration	In orbit	Successful
31 May; 09:30	(United States) Calsphere 4	Naval Research Laboratory		Radar calibration	In orbit	Successful
31 May; 09:30	(United States) NRL-PL 150B	Naval Research Laboratory		Radar calibration	In orbit	Successful
31 May; 09:30	(United States) ORS 5712	USAF		Technology Demonstration	In orbit	Successful

=== June ===
June launches
Date and time (UTC)	Rocket	Flight number	Launch site		LSP	
Date and time (UTC)	Payload	Operator	Orbit	Function	Decay (UTC)	Outcome
Date and time (UTC)	Remarks					
1 June; 10:40	(Soviet Union) Voskhod		(Soviet Union) Site 1/5, Baikonur			
1 June; 10:40	(Soviet Union) Kosmos 162 (Zenit-4 #30)	GRU	Low Earth Orbit	Reconnaissance	9 June	Successful
4 June; 18:07	(United States) Atlas-SLV3 Agena-D		(United States) Vandenberg SLC-4E			
4 June; 18:07	(United States) OPS 4360 KH-7 4038	USAF	Low Earth	Reconnaissance	12 June	Successful
5 June; 05:03	(Soviet Union) Kosmos-2		(Soviet Union) Kapustin Yar			
5 June; 05:03	(Soviet Union) Kosmos 163 (DS-U2-MP #2)		Low Earth Orbit	Micrometeoroid research	11 October	Successful
8 June; 13:00	(Soviet Union) Voskhod		(Soviet Union) Site 41/1, Plesetsk			
8 June; 13:00	(Soviet Union) Kosmos 164 (Zenit-2 #50)	GRU	Low Earth Orbit	Reconnaissance	14 June	Successful
12 June; 02:39	(Soviet Union) Molniya-M / Blok VL		(Soviet Union) Site 1/5, Baikonur			
12 June; 02:39	(Soviet Union) Venera 4		Heliocentric	Venus lander	In orbit	Successful
12 June; 18:06	(Soviet Union) Kosmos-2		(Soviet Union) Site 133/1, Plesetsk			
12 June; 18:06	(Soviet Union) Kosmos 165 (DS-P1-Yu #8)		Low Earth Orbit	Radar calibration	15 January 1968	Successful
14 June; 06:01	(United States) Atlas-SLV3 Agena-D		(United States) Cape Canaveral LC-12			
14 June; 06:01	(United States) Mariner 5	NASA	Heliocentric	Venus flyby	In orbit	Successful
16 June; 04:43	(Soviet Union) Kosmos-2		(Soviet Union) Kapustin Yar			
16 June; 04:43	(Soviet Union) Kosmos 166 (DS-U3-S #1)		Low Earth Orbit	Solar astronomy	25 October	Successful
16 June; 21:35	(United States) Thorad-SLV2G Agena-D		(United States) Vandenberg SLC-1W			
16 June; 21:35	(United States) OPS 3559 KH-4A 1042	CIA	Low Earth	Reconnaissance	20 July	Successful
16 June; 21:35	(United States) OPS 1873 Savant 1	USAF	Low Earth	Signal intelligence	22 October 1968	Successful
17 June; 02:36	(Soviet Union) Molniya-M / Blok VL		(Soviet Union) Site 1/5, Baikonur			
17 June; 02:36	(Soviet Union) Kosmos 167 (Venera 5a)		Heliocentric (planned); Low Earth orbit (achieved)	Venus lander	25 June	Failure
17 June; 02:36	Blok VL failed to fire, leaving the spacecraft in the low Earth orbit					
20 June; 11:00	(Soviet Union) Voskhod		(Soviet Union) Site 41/1, Plesetsk			
20 June; 11:00	(Soviet Union) Zenit-4 #31	GRU	Low Earth Orbit	Reconnaissance	20 June	Failure
20 June; 16:15	(United States) Titan IIIB Agena-D		(United States) Vandenberg SLC-4W			
20 June; 16:15	(United States) OPS 4282 KH-8 4306	USAF	Low Earth	Reconnaissance	30 June	Successful
26 June; 04:30	(Soviet Union) Kosmos-3M		(Soviet Union) Site 132/2, Plesetsk			
26 June; 04:30	(Soviet Union) Tselina-O-GVM #1		Low Earth Orbit	Dummy Satellite	26 June	Failure
29 June; 21:01	(United States) Thor-LV2F Burner-2 Star-13A		(United States) Vandenberg			
29 June; 21:01	(United States) Aurora 1	USAF	Low Earth	Auroral research	In orbit	Successful
29 June; 21:01	(United States) SECOR 9	US Army	Low Earth	Geodesy	In orbit	Successful

=== July ===
July launches
Date and time (UTC)	Rocket	Flight number	Launch site		LSP	
Date and time (UTC)	Payload	Operator	Orbit	Function	Decay (UTC)	Outcome
Date and time (UTC)	Remarks					
1 July; 13:15	(United States) Titan IIIC		(United States) SLC-41, Cape Canaveral		US Air Force	
1 July; 13:15	(United States) DODGE	US Air Force	Geosynchronous Orbit	Triaxial Gravity Gradient Stabilization, Magnetic Field Measurements, and Earth Imagery	In orbit	Successful
1 July; 13:15	(United States) LES 5	USAF	Geosynchronous Orbit	Technology Demonstration	In orbit	Successful
1 July; 13:15	(United States) IDCSP 16 (OPS 9331)	US Air Force	Geosynchronous Orbit	Communications	In orbit	Successful
1 July; 13:15	(United States) IDCSP 17 (OPS 9332)	US Air Force	Geosynchronous Orbit	Communications	In orbit	Successful
1 July; 13:15	(United States) IDCSP 18 (OPS 9333)	US Air Force	Geosynchronous Orbit	Communications	In orbit	Successful
1 July; 13:15	(United States) IDCSP 19-DATS (OPS 9334)	US Air Force	Geosynchronous Orbit	Communications	In orbit	Successful
4 July; 05:59	(Soviet Union) Voskhod		(Soviet Union) Site 31/6, Baikonur			
4 July; 05:59	(Soviet Union) Kosmos 168 (Zenit-2 #51)	GRU	Low Earth Orbit	Reconnaissance	12 July	Successful
14 July; 11:53:29	(United States) Atlas-SLV3 Centaur-D	AC-11	(United States) Cape Canaveral LC-36A			
14 July; 11:53:29	(United States) Surveyor 4	NASA	Translunar injection	Lunar lander	17 July 1967	Spacecraft failure
14 July; 11:53:29	Radio signals from the spacecraft ceased 2.5 minutes before landing on the Moon					
17 July; 16:45	(Soviet Union) R-36-O		(Soviet Union) Site 162/36, Baikonur			
17 July; 16:45	(Soviet Union) Kosmos 169 (OGCh #10)	RVSN	Low Earth Orbit	FOBS test	17 July	Successful
19 July; 14:19	(United States) Delta E1		(United States) Cape Canaveral LC-17B			
19 July; 14:19	(United States) Explorer 35 (IMP E)	NASA	Selenolentric	Lunar orbiter	Unknown	Successful
21 July; 06:00	(Soviet Union) Voskhod		(Soviet Union) Site 31/6, Baikonur			
21 July; 06:00	(Soviet Union) Zenit-4 #32	GRU	Low Earth Orbit	Reconnaissance	21 July	Failure
25 July; 03:48	(United States) Thor SLV-2A Agena-D		(United States) Vandenberg SLC-2W			
25 July; 03:48	(United States) OPS 1879 (Multigroup 2&Setter 1B)	USAF	Low Earth	Signal intelligence	12 June 1969	Successful
27 July; 19:00	(United States) Atlas D OV1		(United States) Vandenberg			
27 July; 19:00	(United States) OV1-11	USAF	Low Earth	Upper atmosphere research	27 July	Failure
27 July; 19:00	(United States) OV1-12	USAF	Low Earth	Solar flare research	22 July 1980	Successful
27 July; 19:00	(United States) OV1-86	USAF	Low Earth	Geophysics, cosmic rays research	22 February 1972	Successful
27 July; 19:00	OV1-11 failed to separate from the launch vehicle					
28 July; 14:21	(United States) Thor SLV-2A Agena-D		(United States) Vandenberg SLC-2E			
28 July; 14:21	(United States) OGO 4 (POGO 2)	NASA	Low Earth orbit	Geophysics research	16 August 1972	Successful
31 July; 16:45	(Soviet Union) R-36-O		(Soviet Union) Site 161/35, Baikonur			
31 July; 16:45	(Soviet Union) Kosmos 170 (OGCh #11)	RVSN	Low Earth Orbit	FOBS test	31 July	Successful

=== August ===
August launches
Date and time (UTC)	Rocket	Flight number	Launch site		LSP	
Date and time (UTC)	Payload	Operator	Orbit	Function	Decay (UTC)	Outcome
Date and time (UTC)	Remarks					
1 August; 22:32	(United States) Atlas SLV-3 Agena-D		(United States) Cape Canaveral LC-13			
1 August; 22:32	(United States) Lunar Orbiter 5	NASA	Selenocentric	Lunar orbiter	31 January 1968	Successful
7 August; 21:44	(United States) Thorad-SLV2G Agena-D		(United States) Vandenberg SLC-1E			
7 August; 21:44	(United States) OPS 4827 KH-4A	CIA	Low Earth orbit	Reconnaissance	1 September	Successful
8 August; 16:05	(Soviet Union) R-36-O		(Soviet Union) Site 162/36, Baikonur			
8 August; 16:05	(Soviet Union) Kosmos 171 (OGCh #12)	RVSN	Low Earth Orbit	FOBS test	8 August	Successful
9 August; 05:45	(Soviet Union) Voskhod		(Soviet Union) Site 1/5, Baikonur			
9 August; 05:45	(Soviet Union) Kosmos 172 (Zenit-4 #33)	GRU	Low Earth Orbit	Reconnaissance	17 August	Successful
16 August; 17:07	(United States) Titan IIIB Agena-D		(United States) Vandenberg SLC-4W			
16 August; 17:07	(United States) OPS 4886 KH-8 4307	CIA	Low Earth orbit	Reconnaissance	28 August	Successful
23 August; 04:41	(United States) Thor LV-2F Burner 2		(United States) Vandenberg			
23 August; 04:41	(United States) OPS 7202 DSMP-4A F3	USAF	Low Earth orbit	Meteorology	In orbit	Successful
24 August; 04:59	(Soviet Union) Kosmos-2		(Soviet Union) Site 133/1, Plesetsk			
24 August; 04:59	(Soviet Union) Kosmos 173 (DS-P1-Yu #9)		Low Earth Orbit	Radar calibration	17 December	Successful
31 August; 08:00	(Soviet Union) Molniya (M)		(Soviet Union) Site 1/5, Baikonur			
31 August; 08:00	(Soviet Union) Kosmos 174 (Molniya 1Yu 11L)		Highly elliptical orbit	Deep space tracking system test	30 December 1968	Successful

=== September ===
September launches
Date and time (UTC)	Rocket	Flight number	Launch site		LSP	
Date and time (UTC)	Payload	Operator	Orbit	Function	Decay (UTC)	Outcome
Date and time (UTC)	Remarks					
1 September; 10:30	(Soviet Union) Voskhod		(Soviet Union) Site 41/1, Plesetsk			
1 September; 10:30	(Soviet Union) Zenit-2 #52	GRU	Low Earth Orbit	Reconnaissance	1 September	Failure
7 September; 22:04:26	(United States) Delta G		(United States) SLC-17B, Cape Canaveral		NASA	
7 September; 22:04:26	(United States) Biosatellite 2 (Bios 2)	NASA	Low Earth Orbit	Biological experiments	9 September 1967	Successful
8 September; 07:57	(United States) Atlas-SLV3 Centaur-D	AC-13	(United States) SLC-36B, Cape Canaveral		NASA	
8 September; 07:57	(United States) Surveyor 5	NASA	Translunar injection	Lunar lander	11 September (on the Moon)	Successful
11 September; 10:30	(Soviet Union) Voskhod		(Soviet Union) Site 41/1, Plesetsk			
11 September; 10:30	(Soviet Union) Kosmos 175 (Zenit-4 #34)	GRU	Low Earth Orbit	Reconnaissance	19 September	Successful
12 September; 17:00	(Soviet Union) Kosmos-2		(Soviet Union) Site 133/1, Plesetsk			
12 September; 17:00	(Soviet Union) Kosmos 176 (DS-P1-Yu #10)		Low Earth Orbit	Radar calibration	3 March 1968	Successful
15 September; 19:41	(United States) Thorad-SLV2G Agena-D		(United States) Vandenberg SLC-1W			
15 September; 19:41	(United States) OPS 5089 KH-4B 1101	USAF	Low Earth	Reconnaissance	4 October	Successful
16 September; 06:06	(Soviet Union) Voskhod		(Soviet Union) Site 1/5, Baikonur			
16 September; 06:06	(Soviet Union) Kosmos 177 (Zenit-2 #53)	GRU	Low Earth Orbit	Reconnaissance	24 October	Successful
19 September; 14:45	(Soviet Union) R-36-O		(Soviet Union) Site 161/35, Baikonur			
19 September; 14:45	(Soviet Union) Kosmos 178 (OGCh #13)	RVSN	Low Earth Orbit	FOBS test	19 September	Successful
19 September; 18:37	(United States) Titan IIIB Agena-D		(United States) Vandenberg SLC-4W			
19 September; 18:37	(United States) OPS 4941 KH-8 4308	USAF	Low Earth	Reconnaissance	30 September	Successful
22 September; 14:05	(Soviet Union) R-36-O		(Soviet Union) Site 162/36, Baikonur			
22 September; 14:05	(Soviet Union) Kosmos 179 (OGCh #14)	RVSN	Low Earth Orbit	FOBS test	22 September	Successful
25 September; 08:25	(United States) Scout A		(United States) SLC-5, Vandenberg AFB		US Air Force	
25 September; 08:25	(United States) OPS 4947 Transit 17	US Navy	Low Earth Orbit	Navigation Satellite	In orbit	Successful
26 September; 10:20	(Soviet Union) Voskhod		(Soviet Union) Site 41/1, Plesetsk			
26 September; 10:20	(Soviet Union) Kosmos 180 (Zenit-2 #54)	GRU	Low Earth Orbit	Reconnaissance	4 October	Successful
27 September; 11:00	(Soviet Union) Kosmos-3M		(Soviet Union) Site 132/2, Plesetsk			
27 September; 11:00	(Soviet Union) Zaliv-GVM #2		Low Earth Orbit	Dummy payload	27 September	Failure
27 September; 22:11	(Soviet Union) Proton-K / Blok D 8K82K (11S824)		(Soviet Union) Pad 81/23, Baikonur		MOM	
27 September; 22:11	(Soviet Union) Zond 4a (L1 4)	MOM	Lunar free-return	Prototype Soyuz 7K-L1P/Zond	T+100 s	Failure
27 September; 22:11	First stage failure					
28 September; 00:45	(United States) Delta E1		(United States) Cape Canaveral LC-17B			
28 September; 00:45	(United Nations) Intelsat II F4 (Pacific-2)	Intelsat	Geosynchronous	Communications	In orbit	Successful

=== October ===
October launches
Date and time (UTC)	Rocket	Flight number	Launch site		LSP	
Date and time (UTC)	Payload	Operator	Orbit	Function	Decay (UTC)	Outcome
Date and time (UTC)	Remarks					
3 October; 05:00	(Soviet Union) Molniya (M)		(Soviet Union) Site 1/5, Baikonur			
3 October; 05:00	(Soviet Union) Molniya-1 06		Molniya	Communications	4 March 1969	Successful
11 October; 07:57	(United States) Thor LV-2F Burner 2		(United States) Vandenberg			
11 October; 07:57	(United States) OPS 1264 DSAP-4A F4	USAF	Sun-synchronous orbit	Meteorology	In orbit	Successful
11 October; 11:30	(Soviet Union) Voskhod		(Soviet Union) Site 41/1, Plesetsk			
11 October; 11:30	(Soviet Union) Kosmos 181 (Zenit-2 #55)	GRU	Low Earth Orbit	Reconnaissance	19 October	Successful
16 October; 08:00	(Soviet Union) Voskhod		(Soviet Union) Site 31/6, Baikonur			
16 October; 08:00	(Soviet Union) Kosmos 182 (Zenit-4 #35)	GRU	Low Earth Orbit	Reconnaissance	24 October	Successful
18 October; 13:30	(Soviet Union) R-36-O		(Soviet Union) Site 161/35, Baikonur			
18 October; 13:30	(Soviet Union) Kosmos 183 (OGCh #15)	RVSN	Low Earth Orbit	FOBS test	18 October	Successful
18 October; 15:58	(United States) Delta C		(United States) Cape Canaveral LC-17B			
18 October; 15:58	(United States) OSO 4	NASA	Low Earth	Solar astronomy	15 June 1982	Successful
22 October; 08:40	(Soviet Union) Molniya (M)		(Soviet Union) Site 1/5, Baikonur			
22 October; 08:40	(Soviet Union) Molniya-1 07		Molniya	Communications	31 December 1969	Successful
24 October; 22:49	(Soviet Union) Vostok-2M		(Soviet Union) Site 41/1, Plesetsk			
24 October; 22:49	(Soviet Union) Kosmos 184 (Meteor-1 #8)		Low Earth Orbit	Meteorology	2 April 1989	Successful
25 October; 19:15	(United States) Titan IIIB Agena-D		(United States) Vandenberg SLC-4W			
25 October; 19:15	(United States) OPS 4995 KH-8 4309	USAF	Low Earth	Reconnaissance	5 November	Successful
27 October; 02:21	(Soviet Union) Tsyklon-2A		(Soviet Union) Site 90/19, Baikonur			
27 October; 02:21	(Soviet Union) Kosmos 185 (I2-BM #1)		Low Earth Orbit	Test spacecraft	14 January 1969	Successful
27 October; 09:29	(Soviet Union) Soyuz		(Soviet Union) Site 31/6, Baikonur			
27 October; 09:29	(Soviet Union) Kosmos 186 (Soyuz Test #3)		Low Earth Orbit	Uncrewed test of Soyuz spacecraft	31 October	Successful
28 October; 13:15	(Soviet Union) R-36-O		(Soviet Union) Site 162/36, Baikonur			
28 October; 13:15	(Soviet Union) Kosmos 187 (OGCh #16)	RVSN	Low Earth Orbit	FOBS test	28 October	Successful
30 October; 08:12	(Soviet Union) Soyuz		(Soviet Union) Site 1/5, Baikonur			
30 October; 08:12	(Soviet Union) Kosmos 188 (Soyuz Test #4)		Low Earth Orbit	Uncrewed test of Soyuz spacecraft	2 November	Successful
30 October; 17:59	(Soviet Union) Kosmos-3M		(Soviet Union) Site 132/2, Plesetsk			
30 October; 17:59	(Soviet Union) Kosmos 189 (Tselina-O #1)		Low Earth Orbit	SIGINT	8 June 1978	Successful

=== November ===
November launches
Date and time (UTC)	Rocket	Flight number	Launch site		LSP	
Date and time (UTC)	Payload	Operator	Orbit	Function	Decay (UTC)	Outcome
Date and time (UTC)	Remarks					
2 November; 21:31	(United States) Thorad-SLV2G Agena-D		(United States) Vandenberg SLC-1E			
2 November; 21:31	(United States) OPS 0562 KH-4A 1044	CIA	Low Earth	Reconnaissance	2 December	Successful
2 November; 21:31	(United States) Facade	USAF	Low Earth	SIGINT	28 March 1969	Successful
3 November; 11:20	(Soviet Union) Voskhod		(Soviet Union) Site 41/1, Plesetsk			
3 November; 11:20	(Soviet Union) Kosmos 190 (Zenit-4 #36)	GRU	Low Earth Orbit	Reconnaissance	11 November	Successful
5 November; 23:37	(United States) Atlas-SLV3 Agena-D		(United States) Cape Canaveral LC-12			
5 November; 23:37	(United States) ATS-3	NASA	Geosynchronous	Communications / Meteorology	In orbit	Successful
7 November; 07:39:01	(United States) Atlas-SLV3 Centaur-D	AC-14	(United States) Cape Canaveral LC-36B			
7 November; 07:39:01	(United States) Surveyor 6	NASA	Translunar injection	Lunar lander	10 November; 01:01:06	Successful
9 November; 12:00	(United States) Saturn V		(United States) LC-39A, Kennedy Space Center		NASA	
9 November; 12:00	(United States) Apollo 4	NASA	Highly elliptical orbit	Test Saturn V and Apollo Command Module reentry	9 November; 20:37	Successful
9 November; 12:00	(United States) LTA-10R	NASA	Highly elliptical orbit	Instrumented dynamic Simulation payload	9 November	Successful
9 November; 12:00	Maiden flight of the Saturn V. LTA-10R remained attached to the S-IVB upper stage					
10 November; 17:53	(United States) Delta E1		(United States) Vandenberg SLC-2E			
10 November; 17:53	(United States) ESSA-6	ESSA	Low Earth (SSO)	Meteorology	In orbit	Successful
21 November; 14:29	(Soviet Union) Kosmos-2		(Soviet Union) Plesetsk Site 133/1			
21 November; 14:29	(Soviet Union) Kosmos 191 (DS-P1-Yu #11)		Low Earth Orbit	Radar Calibration	2 March 1968	Successful
22 November; 19:07	(Soviet Union) Proton K / Blok D		(Soviet Union) Pad 81/23, Baikonur		MOM	
22 November; 19:07	(Soviet Union) Zond 4b	MOM	Lunar Free-return	Prototype Soyuz 7K-L1P/Zond	22 November	Failure
22 November; 19:07	Second stage failure					
23 November; 15:00	(Soviet Union) Kosmos-3M		(Soviet Union) Plesetsk Site 132/2			
23 November; 15:00	(Soviet Union) Kosmos 192 (Zaliv #1)		Low Earth Orbit	Navigation	In orbit	Successful
25 November; 11:30	(Soviet Union) Voskhod		(Soviet Union) Site 41/1, Plesetsk			
25 November; 11:30	(Soviet Union) Kosmos 193 (Zenit-2 #56)	GRU	Low Earth Orbit	Reconnaissance	3 December	Successful
29 November; 04:49	(United States) Redstone Sparta		(Australia) LA-8, Woomera		WRE	
29 November; 04:49	(Australia) WRESAT	WRE	Low Earth orbit	Atmospheric experiments	10 January 1968	Successful
29 November; 04:49	First Australian satellite					

=== December ===
December launches
Date and time (UTC)	Rocket	Flight number	Launch site		LSP	
Date and time (UTC)	Payload	Operator	Orbit	Function	Decay (UTC)	Outcome
Date and time (UTC)	Remarks					
3 December; 12:00	(Soviet Union) Voskhod		(Soviet Union) Site 41/1, Plesetsk			
3 December; 12:00	(Soviet Union) Kosmos 194 (Zenit-4 #37)	GRU	Low Earth Orbit	Reconnaissance	11 December	Successful
5 December; 01:03	(United States) Scout B		(United States) SLC-5, Vandenberg AFB		US Air Force	
5 December; 01:03	OV3-6	US Air Force	Low Earth Orbit	Magnetospheric Research	9 March 1969	Successful
5 December; 18:45	(United States) Titan IIIB Agena-D		(United States) Vandenberg SLC-4W			
5 December; 18:45	(United States) OPS 5000 KH-8 4310	USAF	Low Earth	Reconnaissance	16 December	Successful
9 December; 22:25	(United States) Thorad-SLV2G Agena-D		(United States) Vandenberg SLC-1W			
9 December; 22:25	(United States) OPS 1001 KH-4A 1102	CIA	Low Earth	Reconnaissance	25 December	Successful
13 December; 14:08	(United States) Delta E1		(United States) Cape Canaveral LC-17B			
13 December; 14:08	(United States) Pioneer 8	NASA	Heliocentric	Solar orbiter	In orbit	Successful
13 December; 14:08	(United States) TTR	NASA	Heliocentric	Technology Demonstration	In orbit	Successful
16 December; 12:00	(Soviet Union) Voskhod		(Soviet Union) Site 41/1, Plesetsk			
16 December; 12:00	(Soviet Union) Kosmos 195 (Zenit-2 #57)	GRU	Low Earth Orbit	Reconnaissance	24 December	Successful
19 December; 06:30	(Soviet Union) Kosmos		(Soviet Union) Kapustin Yar, Site 86/1			
19 December; 06:30	(Soviet Union) Kosmos 196 (DS-U1-G #2)		Low Earth Orbit	Solar research	7 July 1968	Successful
19 December; 06:30	Final flight of the original Kosmos (63S1)					
26 December; 09:01	(Soviet Union) Kosmos-2		(Soviet Union) Kapustin Yar, Site 86/1			
26 December; 09:01	(Soviet Union) Kosmos 197 (DS-U2-V #3)		Low Earth Orbit	Ionosphere research	30 January 1968	Successful
27 December; 11:28	(Soviet Union) Tsyklon-2A		(Soviet Union) Site 90/19, Baikonur			
27 December; 11:28	(Soviet Union) Kosmos 198 (US-AO #3)		Low Earth Orbit	Prototype of US-A satellite	In orbit	Successful

- ← Jan
- Feb
- Mar
- Apr
- May
- Jun
- Jul
- Aug
- Sep
- Oct
- Nov
- Dec →

== Suborbital launches ==
- ← Jan
- Feb
- Mar
- Apr
- May
- Jun
- Jul
- Aug
- Sep
- Oct
- Nov
- Dec →

Date and time (UTC)	Rocket	Flight number	Launch site		LSP	
Date and time (UTC)	Payload	Operator	Orbit	Function	Decay (UTC)	Outcome
Date and time (UTC)	Remarks					
=== January-December ===
25 January; 23:16	(France) Dragon		(Adélie Land) Dumont d'Urville Station, Terre Adelie			
25 January; 23:16	(France)	CNES	Suborbital	Ionosphere research	25 January	Successful
25 January; 23:16	Apogee: 340 km					
31 January; 23:05	(Soviet Union) MR-12		(Soviet Union) Kheysa			
31 January; 23:05	(Soviet Union)	AN SSSR	Suborbital	Thermosphere research	31 January	Successful
31 January; 23:05	Apogee: 172 km					
6 February; 02:10	(Japan) L-3H		(Japan) Kagoshima Space Center LP-L			
6 February; 02:10	(Japan)	ISAS	Suborbital	Ionosphere research, X-ray astronomy	6 February	Successful
6 February; 02:10	Apogee: 2150 km					
9 February	(Soviet Union) RT-15		(Soviet Union) Kapustin Yar, Site 84		(Soviet Union) RVSN	
9 February	(Soviet Union)	RVSN	Suborbital	Missile test	4 December	Successful
5 March; 23:05	(United States) Atlas SLV-3		(United States) Vandenberg AFB, SLC-3E		(United States) US Air Force	
5 March; 23:05	(United States) SV-5D FV-2	US Air Force	Suborbital	Lifting body reentry test	5 March	Successful
5 March; 23:05	Second test of PRIME					
4 August; 03:53	(European Union) Europa	F6/1	(Australia) LA-6A, Woomera		ELDO	
4 August; 03:53			Suborbital	Test launcher with dummy third stage	N/A	Failure
4 August; 03:53	Second stage failed to ignite. Apogee: 180 km					
11 October; 16:22	(United States) Sparta	SV-8	(Australia) LA-8, Woomera		(United States) US Army	
11 October; 16:22	(United States) Re-entry vehicle	US Army	Suborbital	Re-entry vehicle test	11 October	Successful
11 October; 16:22	Apogee: 137 km					
12 October; 14:15	(Soviet Union) Kosmos-3		(Soviet Union) Baikonur Site 41/15			
12 October; 14:15	(Soviet Union) VKZ 1		Suborbital	Aeronomy, ionosphere and radiation belt research	T+52 min	Successful
12 October; 14:15	Launched on the strictly vertical trajectory. Apogee: 4,400 km					
19 October; 17:33	(United States) Scout B		(United States) LA-3A, Wallops Island		US Air Force	
19 October; 17:33	(United States) RAM C-1	NASA	Suborbital	Technology Demonstration	19 October	Successful
31 October; 13:14	(United States) Sparta	SV-9	(Australia) LA-8, Woomera		(United States) US Army	
31 October; 13:14	(United States) Re-entry vehicle	US Army	Suborbital	Re-entry vehicle test	31 October	Successful
31 October; 13:14	Apogee: 111 km					
November	(France) LEX	02B/1	(France) CERES Ile du Levant		(France) ONERA	
November	(France)	ONERA	Suborbital	Test flight	November	Successful
November	Apogee: 115 km					
November	(France) LEX	02B/2	(France) CERES Ile du Levant		(France) ONERA	
November	(France)	ONERA	Suborbital	Test flight	November	Successful
November	Apogee: 115 km					
November	(France) LEX	02B/4	(France) CERES Ile du Levant		(France) ONERA	
November	(France) SECT Meteo	ONERA	Suborbital	Meteorology	November	Successful
November	Apogee: 101 km					
4 December; 21:01	(European Union) Europa	F6/2	(Australia) LA-6A, Woomera		ELDO	
4 December; 21:01	N/A	ELDO	Suborbital	Test launcher with dummy third stage and boilerplate spacecraft	N/A	Failure
4 December; 21:01	Second stage failed to separate. Apogee: 200 km					

- ← Jan
- Feb
- Mar
- Apr
- May
- Jun
- Jul
- Aug
- Sep
- Oct
- Nov
- Dec →

== Deep Space Rendezvous ==
Date (UTC)	Spacecraft	Event	Remarks
8 February	Lunar Orbiter 3	Selenocentric orbit insertion	Returned 182 images
20 April	Surveyor 3	Lunar landing	in Oceanus Procellarum
8 May	Lunar Orbiter 4	Selenocentric orbit insertion	Returned 163 images
17 July	Surveyor 4	Lunar impact	Failed lander, impacted Sinus Medii
22 July	Explorer 35	Selenocentric orbit insertion	
5 August	Lunar Orbiter 5	Selenocentric orbit insertion	Returned 213 images
11 September	Surveyor 5	Lunar landing	in Mare Tranquillitatis
1 October	Lunar Orbiter 2	Lunar impact	
10 October	Lunar Orbiter 3	Lunar impact	
18 October	Venera 4	Venus probe	Atmospheric probe functioned for 94 minutes in the Venerian atmosphere
19 October	Mariner 5	Flyby of Venus	Closest approach 3,990 kilometres (2,480 mi)
31 October	Lunar Orbiter 4	Lunar impact	
10 November	Surveyor 6	Lunar landing	in Sinus Medii
