= Surveyor 4 =

NASA space probe

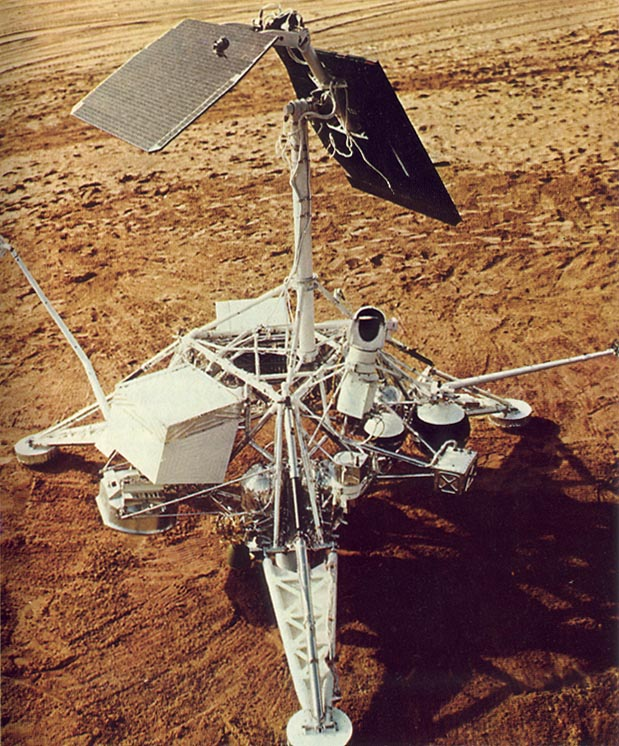
- Surveyor model on Earth
- Mission type: Lunar lander
- Operator: NASA
- COSPAR ID: 1967-068A
- SATCAT no.: 02875
- Mission duration: 62 hrs. 9 min. 1 sec. (launch to last contact)

Spacecraft properties
- Manufacturer: Hughes Aircraft
- Launch mass: 1,037.4 kg
- Dry mass: 283 kilograms (624 lb)

Start of mission
- Launch date: July 14, 1967, 11:53:29 UTC
- Rocket: Atlas LV-3C Centaur-D AC-11
- Launch site: Cape Canaveral LC-36A

End of mission
- Last contact: July 17, 1967, 02:02:30 UTC (approx)

Lunar impact (failed landing)
- Impact date: July 17, 1967, 02:05:00 UTC
- Impact site: 0.45°N 1.39°W

Surveyor 4 is the fourth lunar lander in the American uncrewed Surveyor program sent to explore the surface of the Moon. This spacecraft crashed after an otherwise flawless mission; telemetry contact was lost 2.5 minutes before touchdown. The planned landing target was Sinus Medii (Central Bay) at 0.4° north latitude and 1.33° west longitude.

Surveyor 6 successfully landed near the crash site of Surveyor 4 a few months later in November 1967.

== Mission ==
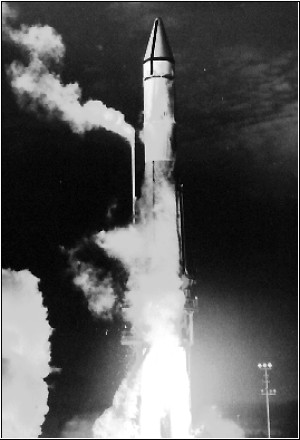
Surveyor 4 launch (Atlas AC-11)

This spacecraft was the fourth in a series designed to achieve a soft landing on the Moon and to return photography of the lunar surface for determining characteristics of the lunar terrain for Apollo lunar landing missions. Equipment on board included a television camera and auxiliary mirrors, a soil mechanics surface sampler, strain gauges on the spacecraft landing legs, and numerous engineering sensors. Like Surveyor 3, Surveyor 4 was also equipped with a surface claw (with a magnet in the claw) to detect and measure ferrous elements in the lunar surface.

After a flawless flight to the Moon, radio signals from the spacecraft ceased during the terminal-descent phase at 02:03 UT on July 17, 1967, approximately 2.5 minutes before touchdown. Contact with the spacecraft was never reestablished, and the mission was unsuccessful. The solid-fuel retrorocket may have exploded near the end of its scheduled burn.

== See also ==
- 1967 in spaceflight
- List of artificial objects on the Moon
- List of missions to the Moon
