= Kosmos 166 =

Soviet sun imaging satellite

- Mission type: Solar imaging
- COSPAR ID: 1967-061A
- SATCAT no.: 02848
- Mission duration: 131 days

Spacecraft properties
- Spacecraft type: DS-U3-S
- Manufacturer: Yuzhnoye
- Launch mass: 400 kg

Start of mission
- Launch date: 16 June 1967, 04:44:00 GMT
- Rocket: Kosmos-2I 63SM
- Launch site: Kapustin Yar, 86/1
- Contractor: Yuzhnoye

End of mission
- Decay date: 25 October 1967

Orbital parameters
- Reference system: Geocentric
- Regime: Low Earth
- Perigee altitude: 281 km
- Apogee altitude: 553 km
- Inclination: 48.4°
- Period: 92.6 minutes
- Epoch: 16 June 1967

Kosmos 166 (Russian: Космос 166 meaning Cosmos 166), also known as DS-U3-S No.1, was a satellite which was launched by the Soviet Union in 1967 as part of the Dnepropetrovsk Sputnik programme. It was a 400 kilograms (880 lb) spacecraft, which was built by the Yuzhnoye Design Office, and was used to conduct multispectral imaging of the Sun.

Kosmos 166 was launched from Site 86/1 at Kapustin Yar, aboard a Kosmos-2I 63SM carrier rocket. The launch occurred at 04:44:00 GMT on 16 June 1967, and resulted in the successful insertion of the satellite into a low Earth orbit. Upon reaching orbit, the satellite was assigned its Kosmos designation, and received the International Designator 1967-061A. The North American Air Defense Command assigned it the catalogue number 02848.

Kosmos 166 was the first of two DS-U3-S satellites to be launched, the other being Kosmos 230. It was operated in an orbit with a perigee of 281 kilometres (175 mi), an apogee of 553 kilometres (344 mi), an inclination of 48.4°, and an orbital period of 92.6 minutes. It completed operations on 26 September 1967, before decaying from orbit and reentering the atmosphere on 25 October.

== See also ==
- 1967 in spaceflight
