= Kosmos 176 =

Soviet radar calibration target satellite

- Mission type: ABM radar target
- COSPAR ID: 1967-086A
- SATCAT no.: 02942
- Mission duration: 173 days

Spacecraft properties
- Spacecraft type: DS-P1-Yu
- Manufacturer: Yuzhnoye
- Launch mass: 400 kg

Start of mission
- Launch date: 12 September 1967; 17:00:00 GMT
- Rocket: Kosmos-2I 63SM
- Launch site: Plesetsk, Site 133/3
- Contractor: Yuzhnoye

End of mission
- Decay date: 3 March 1968

Orbital parameters
- Reference system: Geocentric
- Regime: Low Earth
- Perigee altitude: 196 km
- Apogee altitude: 1525 km
- Inclination: 81.9°
- Period: 102.5 minutes
- Epoch: 12 September 1967

Kosmos 176 (Russian: Космос 176 meaning Cosmos 176), also known as DS-P1-Yu No.10 was a Soviet satellite which was used as a radar calibration target for tests of anti-ballistic missiles. It was a 400 kilograms (880 lb) spacecraft, was built by the Yuzhnoye Design Office, and launched in 1967 as part of the Dnepropetrovsk Sputnik programme.

A Kosmos-2I 63SM carrier rocket was used to launch Kosmos 176 from Site 133/3 at Plesetsk Cosmodrome. The launch occurred at 17:00:00 GMT on 12 September 1967, and resulted in Kosmos 176's successful deployment into low Earth orbit. Upon reaching orbit, it was assigned its Kosmos designation, and received the International Designator 1967-086A.

Kosmos 176 was operated in an orbit with a perigee of 196 kilometres (122 mi), an apogee of 1,525 kilometres (948 mi), an inclination of 81.9°, and an orbital period of 102.5 minutes. It remained in orbit until it decayed and reentered the atmosphere on 3 March 1968. It was the tenth of seventy nine DS-P1-Yu satellites to be launched, and the ninth of seventy two to successfully reach orbit.

== See also ==
- 1967 in spaceflight
