= Kosmos 197 =

Soviet satellite

- Mission type: Technology
- COSPAR ID: 1967-126A
- SATCAT no.: 03079
- Mission duration: 34 days

Spacecraft properties
- Spacecraft type: DS-U2-V
- Manufacturer: Yuzhnoye
- Launch mass: 325 kg

Start of mission
- Launch date: 26 December 1967; 09:01:59 GMT
- Rocket: Kosmos-2I 63SM
- Launch site: Kapustin Yar, Site 86/4
- Contractor: Yuzhnoye

End of mission
- Decay date: 30 January 1968

Orbital parameters
- Reference system: Geocentric
- Regime: Low Earth
- Perigee altitude: 217 km
- Apogee altitude: 486 km
- Inclination: 48.5°
- Period: 91.5 minutes
- Epoch: 26 December 1967

Kosmos 197 (Russian: Космос 197 meaning Cosmos 197), also known as DS-U2-V No.3, was a Soviet satellite which was launched in 1967 as part of the Dnepropetrovsk Sputnik programme. It was a 325 kilograms (717 lb) spacecraft, which was built by the Yuzhnoye Design Office, and was used to conduct classified technology development experiments for the Soviet armed forces.

A Kosmos-2I 63SM carrier rocket was used to launch Kosmos 197 into low Earth orbit. The launch took place from Site 86/4 at Kapustin Yar. The launch occurred at 09:01:59 GMT on 26 December 1967, and resulted in the successful insertion of the satellite into orbit. Upon reaching orbit, the satellite was assigned its Kosmos designation, and received the International Designator 1967-126A. The North American Air Defense Command assigned it the catalogue number 03079.

Kosmos 197 was the third of four DS-U2-V satellites to be launched. It was operated in an orbit with a perigee of 217 kilometres (135 mi), an apogee of 486 kilometres (302 mi), an inclination of 48.5°, and an orbital period of 91.5 minutes. On 30 January 1968, it decayed from orbit and reentered the atmosphere.

== See also ==
- 1967 in spaceflight
