= Kosmos 152 =

Soviet radar calibration target satellite

- Mission type: ABM Radar target
- COSPAR ID: 1967-028A
- SATCAT no.: 02722
- Mission duration: 133 days

Spacecraft properties
- Spacecraft type: DS-P1-Yu
- Manufacturer: Yuzhnoye
- Launch mass: 325 kg

Start of mission
- Launch date: 25 March 1967, 06:57:00 GMT
- Rocket: Kosmos-2I 63SM
- Launch site: Plesetsk, Site 133/3
- Contractor: Yuzhnoye

End of mission
- Decay date: 5 August 1967

Orbital parameters
- Reference system: Geocentric
- Regime: Low Earth
- Perigee altitude: 272 km
- Apogee altitude: 488 km
- Inclination: 71.0°
- Period: 92.2 minutes
- Epoch: 25 March 1967

Kosmos 152 (Russian: Космос 152 meaning Cosmos 152), also known as DS-P1-Yu No.7 was a Soviet satellite which was used as a radar calibration target for tests of anti-ballistic missiles. It was built by the Yuzhnoye Design Bureau, and launched in 1967 as part of the Dnepropetrovsk Sputnik programme, and had a mass of 325 kilograms (717 lb).

Kosmos 152 was launched using a Kosmos-2I 63SM carrier rocket, which flew from Site 133/3 at Plesetsk Cosmodrome. The launch occurred at 06:57 GMT on 25 March 1967.

Kosmos 152 separated from its carrier rocket into a low Earth orbit with a perigee of 272 kilometres (169 mi), an apogee of 488 kilometres (303 mi), an inclination of 71.0°, and an orbital period of 92.2 minutes. It decayed from orbit on 5 August 1967. Kosmos 152 was the seventh of seventy nine DS-P1-Yu satellites to be launched, and the sixth of seventy two to successfully reach orbit.

== See also ==
- 1967 in spaceflight
