= Kosmos 191 =

Soviet radar calibration target satellite

- Mission type: ABM radar target
- COSPAR ID: 1967-115A
- SATCAT no.: 03043
- Mission duration: 102 days

Spacecraft properties
- Spacecraft type: DS-P1-Yu
- Manufacturer: Yuzhnoye
- Launch mass: 325 kg

Start of mission
- Launch date: 21 November 1967, 14:29:48 GMT
- Rocket: Kosmos-2I 63SM
- Launch site: Plesetsk, Site 133/3
- Contractor: Yuzhnoye

End of mission
- Decay date: 2 March 1968

Orbital parameters
- Reference system: Geocentric
- Regime: Low Earth
- Perigee altitude: 267 km
- Apogee altitude: 497 km
- Inclination: 71.0°
- Period: 92.2 minutes
- Epoch: 21 November 1967

Kosmos 191 (Russian: Космос 191 meaning Cosmos 191), also known as DS-P1-Yu No.9 was a Soviet satellite which was used as a radar calibration target for tests of anti-ballistic missiles. It was built by the Yuzhnoye Design Office, and launched in 1967 as part of the Dnepropetrovsk Sputnik programme.

A Kosmos-2I 63SM carrier rocket was used to launch Kosmos 191 from Site 133/3 at Plesetsk Cosmodrome. The launch occurred at 14:29:48 GMT on 21 November 1967, and resulted in Kosmos 191's successful deployment into low Earth orbit. Upon reaching orbit, it was assigned its Kosmos designation, and received the International Designator 1967-115A.

Kosmos 191 was operated in an orbit with a perigee of 267 kilometres (166 mi), an apogee of 497 kilometres (309 mi), an inclination of 71.0°, and an orbital period of 92.2 minutes. It was a 325 kilograms (717 lb) spacecraft. It remained in orbit until it decayed and reentered the atmosphere on 2 March 1968. It was the eleventh of seventy nine DS-P1-Yu satellites to be launched, and the tenth of seventy two to successfully reach orbit.

== See also ==
- 1967 in spaceflight
