= Kosmos 159 =

- Mission type: Uncrewed lunar spacecraft
- Operator: GSMZ Lavochkin
- COSPAR ID: 1967-046A
- SATCAT no.: 02805
- Mission duration: 179 days

Spacecraft properties
- Spacecraft type: E-6LS
- Manufacturer: GSMZ Lavochkin
- Launch mass: 1640 kg
- Dry mass: 1136 kg

Start of mission
- Launch date: 16 May 1967, 21:43:57 GMT
- Rocket: Molniya-M s/n N15001-58
- Launch site: Baikonur, Site 1/5
- Contractor: TsSKB-Progress

End of mission
- Decay date: 11 November 1967

Orbital parameters
- Reference system: Geocentric
- Regime: Elliptic Earth
- Perigee altitude: 350 km
- Apogee altitude: 60637 km
- Inclination: 51.8°
- Period: 1174.0 minutes
- Epoch: 16 May 1967

Kosmos 159 (Russian: Космос 159, meaning Cosmos 159), E-6LS No.111, was one of many satellites designed during the Soviet space program given the designation Kosmos. This satellite was specifically designed to be a high orbit satellite used to gain information on trajectory anomalies caused by the Moon's gravitational pull. This data would have been vital to the Soviet space program and could have been key in successful crewed missions to the Moon. This mission was also used to test radio communications in space.

== Spacecraft ==
Kosmos 159 was a one-off high apogee Earth satellite developed to acquire data on new telecommunications systems for upcoming crewed missions to the Moon. Besides a usual complement of telemetry and communications equipment, the vehicle also carried a transceiver as part of the long-range communications system (Dal'nyy radiokompleks, DRK) and the BR-9-7 telemetry system, equipment designed to work with the new SaturnMS-DRK ground station located near the village of Saburovo, about 10 kilometres (6.2 mi) from NIP-14, a station, close to Moscow, belonging to the Soviet ground-based tracking network. The spacecraft was similar to Luna 11 but had a slightly lengthened (by 15 centimetres (5.9 in)) instrument container so as to accommodate the modified DRK and new BR-9-7 telemetry systems.

== Mission ==
The Kosmos 159 was launched 16 May 1967 at 21:43:57 GMT, which was a radio-equipped version of the E-6 used to test tracking and communications networks for the Soviet crewed lunar program. The objective of the mission was to acquire data on trajectory measurement techniques for future crewed lunar missions. Kosmos 159 was planned to go into a very high apogee (250,000 km) orbit, but the Blok L upper stage is to have cut off too early, leaving the spacecraft in a perigee of 350 kilometres (220 mi), an apogee of 60,637 kilometres (37,678 mi), an inclination of 51.8°, and an orbital period of 1174.0 minutes. Despite the incorrect orbit, controllers were able to accomplish the original mission, carried out over a period of nine days during which it was discovered that the energy potential of the UHF downlink from the spacecraft to the ground was 1–2 orders magnitude below the calculated value. Kosmos 159 reentered the Earth's atmosphere on 11 November 1967. The craft weighed 1,640 kilograms (3,620 lb).
