= Surveyor program =

1960s NASA program to soft-land robotic probes on the Moon

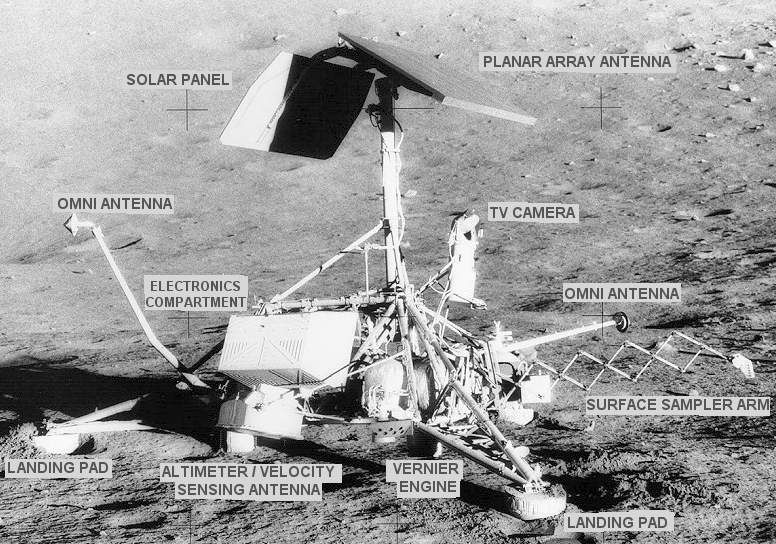
- Surveyor 3 resting on the surface of the Moon, taken by Apollo 12 astronauts

Program overview
- Country: United States
- Organization: NASA
- Purpose: Demonstrate soft landing on the Moon
- Status: Completed

Program history
- Cost: US$469 million
- First flight: May 30–June 2, 1966
- Last flight: January 7–10, 1968
- Successes: 5
- Failures: 2
- Launch site: Cape Canaveral LC-36

Vehicle information
- Launch vehicle: Atlas-Centaur

The Surveyor program was a NASA program that, from June 1966 through January 1968, sent seven robotic spacecraft to the surface of the Moon. Its primary goal was to demonstrate the feasibility of soft landings on the Moon. The Surveyor craft were the first American spacecraft to achieve soft landing on an extraterrestrial body. The missions called for the craft to travel directly to the Moon on an impact trajectory, a journey that lasted 63 to 65 hours, and ended with a deceleration of just over three minutes to a soft landing.

The program was implemented by NASA's Jet Propulsion Laboratory (JPL) to prepare for the Apollo program, and started in 1960. JPL selected Hughes Aircraft in 1961 to develop the spacecraft system. The total cost of the Surveyor program was officially $469 million.

Five of the Surveyor craft successfully soft-landed on the Moon, including the first one. The other two failed: Surveyor 2 crashed at high velocity after a failed mid-course correction, and Surveyor 4 lost contact (possibly exploding) 2.5 minutes before its scheduled touch-down.

All seven spacecraft are still on the Moon; none of the missions included returning them to Earth. Some parts of Surveyor 3 were returned to Earth by the crew of Apollo 12, which landed near it in 1969. The camera from this craft is on display at the National Air and Space Museum in Washington, DC.

== Goals ==

Landing sites of American Surveyor and Apollo programs, together with Soviet Luna program.

The program performed several other services beyond its primary goal of demonstrating soft landings. The ability of spacecraft to make midcourse corrections was demonstrated, and the landers carried instruments to help evaluate the suitability of their landing sites for crewed Apollo landings. Several Surveyor spacecraft had robotic shovels designed to test lunar soil mechanics. Before the Soviet Luna 9 mission (landing four months before Surveyor 1) and the Surveyor project, it was unknown how deep the dust on the Moon was. If the dust was too deep, then no astronaut could land. The Surveyor program proved that landings were possible. Some of the Surveyors also had alpha scattering instruments and magnets, which helped determine the chemical composition of the soil.

The simple and reliable mission architecture was a pragmatic approach to solving the most critical space engineering challenges of the time, namely the closed-loop terminal descent guidance and control system, throttleable engines, and the radar systems required for determining the lander's altitude and velocity. The Surveyor missions were the first time that NASA tested such systems in the challenging thermal and radiation environment near the Moon.

== Launch and lunar landing ==
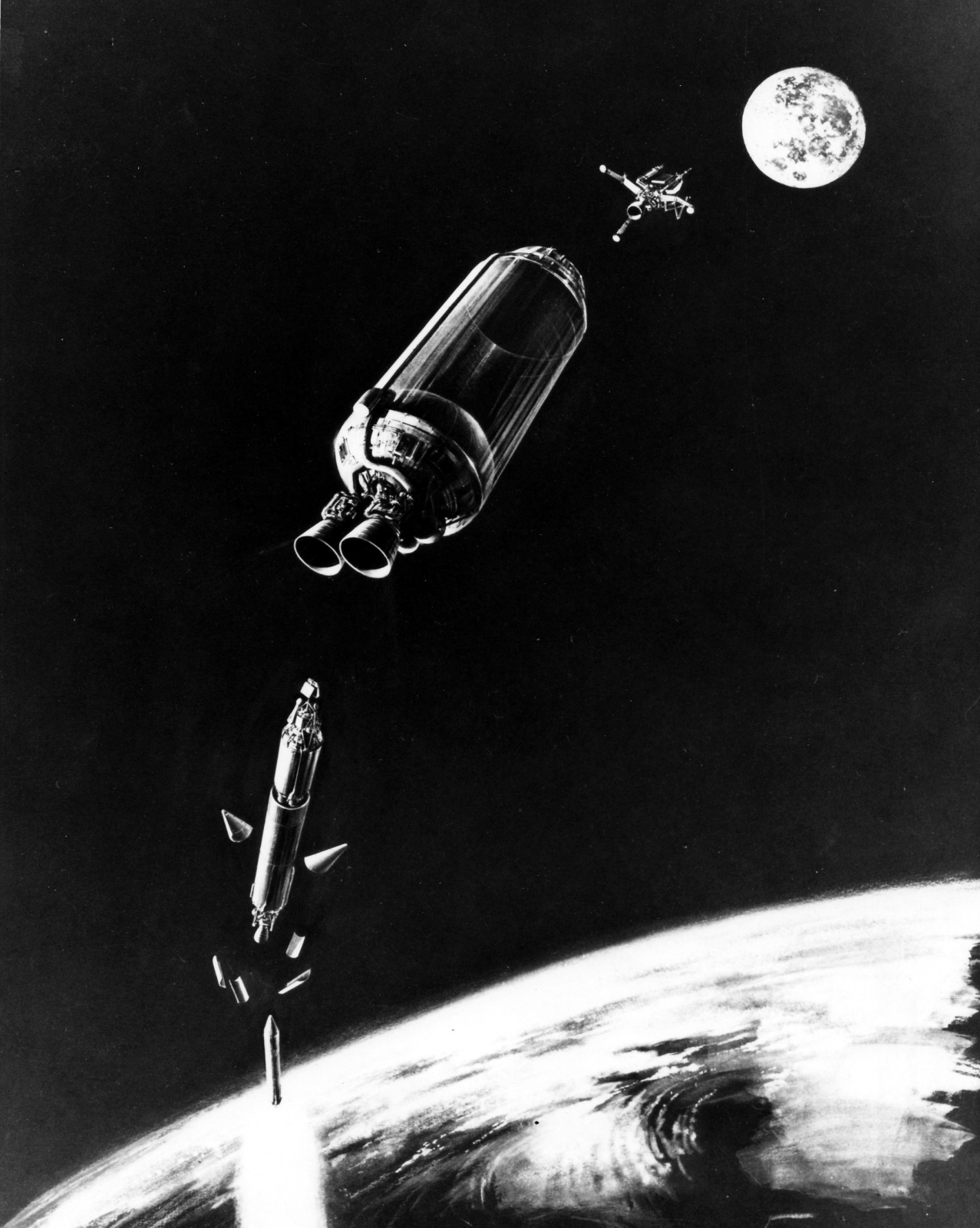
Atlas-Centaur injecting a Surveyor lander directly into trans-lunar flightpath

Each Surveyor mission consisted of a single unmanned spacecraft designed and built by Hughes Aircraft Company. The launch vehicle was the Atlas-Centaur, which injected the craft directly into trans-lunar flightpath. The craft did not orbit the Moon on reaching it, but directly decelerated from impact trajectory, from 2.6 km/s relative to the Moon before firing retrorockets to a soft landing about 3 minutes 10 seconds later.

Each craft was planned to slow down by 96% to about 110 m/s by a main solid fuel retrorocket, which fired for 40 seconds starting at an altitude of 75.3 km above the Moon, and then was jettisoned along with the radar unit at 11 km from the surface. The remainder of the trip to the surface, lasting about 2.5 minutes, was handled by smaller doppler radar units and three vernier engines running on liquid fuels fed to them using pressurized helium. (The successful flight profile of Surveyor 5 was given a somewhat shortened vernier flight sequence as a result of a helium leak.) The last 3.4 meters to the surface was accomplished in free fall from zero velocity at that height, after the vernier engines were turned off. This resulted in a landing speed of about 3 m/s. The free-fall to the surface was in an attempt to avoid surface contamination by rocket blast.

Surveyor 1 required a total of about 63 hours (2.6 days) to reach the Moon, and Surveyor 5 required 65 hours (2.7 days). The launch weights (at lunar injection) of the seven Surveyors ranged from 995.2 kilograms (2,194 lb) to 1,040 kilograms (2,290 lb), and their landing weights (minus fuel, jettisoned retrorocket, and radar unit) ranged from 294.3 kilograms (649 lb) to 306 kilograms (675 lb).

== Missions ==
=== Surveyor 1 ===
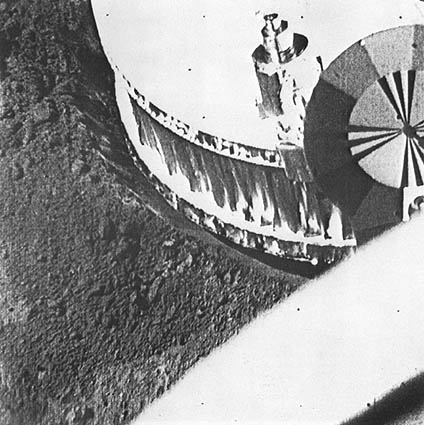
Image from Surveyor 1 of its footpad in order to study soil mechanics in preparation for the Apollo crewed landings.

Surveyor 1 was launched May 30, 1966 and sent directly into a trajectory to the Moon without any parking orbit. Its retrorockets were turned off at a height of about 3.4 meters above the lunar surface. Surveyor 1 fell freely to the surface from this height, and it landed on the lunar surface on June 2, 1966, on the Oceanus Procellarum. This location was at 2.474°S 43.339°W. This is within the northeast portion of the large crater called Flamsteed P (or the Flamsteed Ring). Flamsteed itself lies within Flamsteed P on the south side.

Surveyor 1 transmitted video data from the Moon beginning shortly after its landing through July 14, 1966, but with a period of no operations during the two-week long lunar night of June 14, 1966 through July 7, 1966.

The return of engineering information (temperatures, etc.) from Surveyor 1 continued through January 7, 1967, with several interruptions during the lunar nights. The spacecraft returned data on the motion of the Moon, which would be used to refine the map of its orbital path around the Earth as well as better determine the distance between the two worlds.

=== Surveyor 2 ===
Surveyor 2 was launched on September 20, 1966. A mid-course correction failure resulted in the spacecraft losing control. Contact was lost with the spacecraft at 9:35 UTC, September 22.

=== Surveyor 3 ===
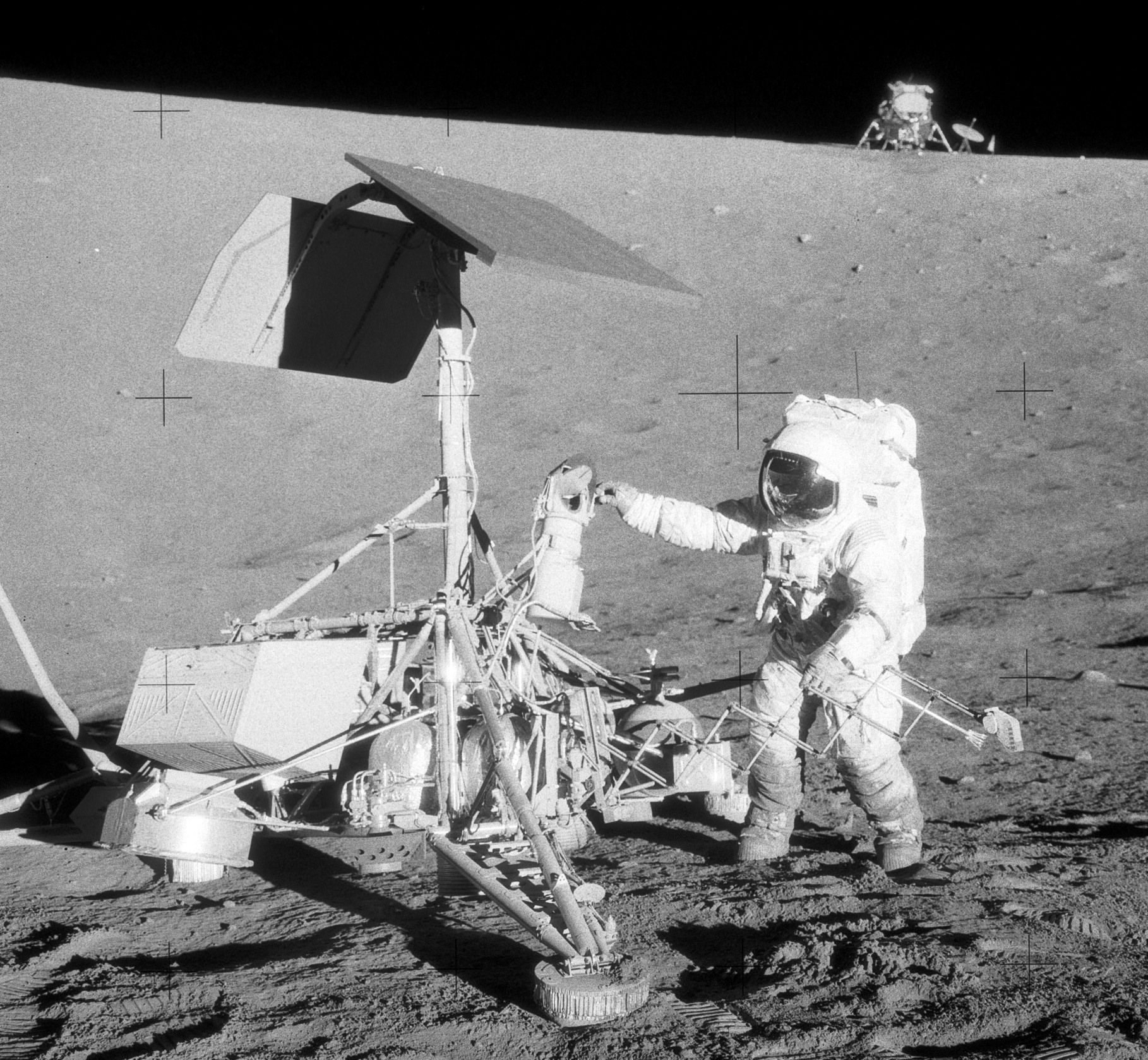
Astronaut Pete Conrad near Surveyor 3 during Apollo 12, 1969. Lunar Module in the background.

Launched on April 17, 1967, Surveyor 3 landed on April 20, 1967, at the Mare Cognitum portion of the Oceanus Procellarum (S3° 01' 41.43" W23° 27' 29.55"), in a small crater that was subsequently named Surveyor. It transmitted 6,315 TV images to the Earth, including the first images to show what planet Earth looked like from the Moon's surface.

Surveyor 3 was the first spacecraft to unintentionally lift off from the Moon's surface, which it did twice, due to an anomaly with Surveyor's landing radar, which did not shut off the vernier engines but kept them firing throughout the first touchdown and after it. Surveyor 3's TV and telemetry systems were found to have been damaged by its unplanned landings and liftoffs.

Surveyor 3 was visited by Apollo 12 astronauts Pete Conrad and Alan Bean in November 1969, and remains the only probe visited by humans on another world. The Apollo 12 astronauts excised several components of Surveyor 3, including the television camera, and returned them to Earth for study.

=== Surveyor 4 ===
Launched on July 14, 1967, Surveyor 4 crashed after an otherwise flawless mission; telemetry contact was lost 2.5 minutes before touchdown. The solid-fuel retrorocket may have exploded near the end of its scheduled burn. The planned landing target was Sinus Medii (Central Bay) at 0.4° north latitude and 1.33° west longitude.

=== Surveyor 5 ===
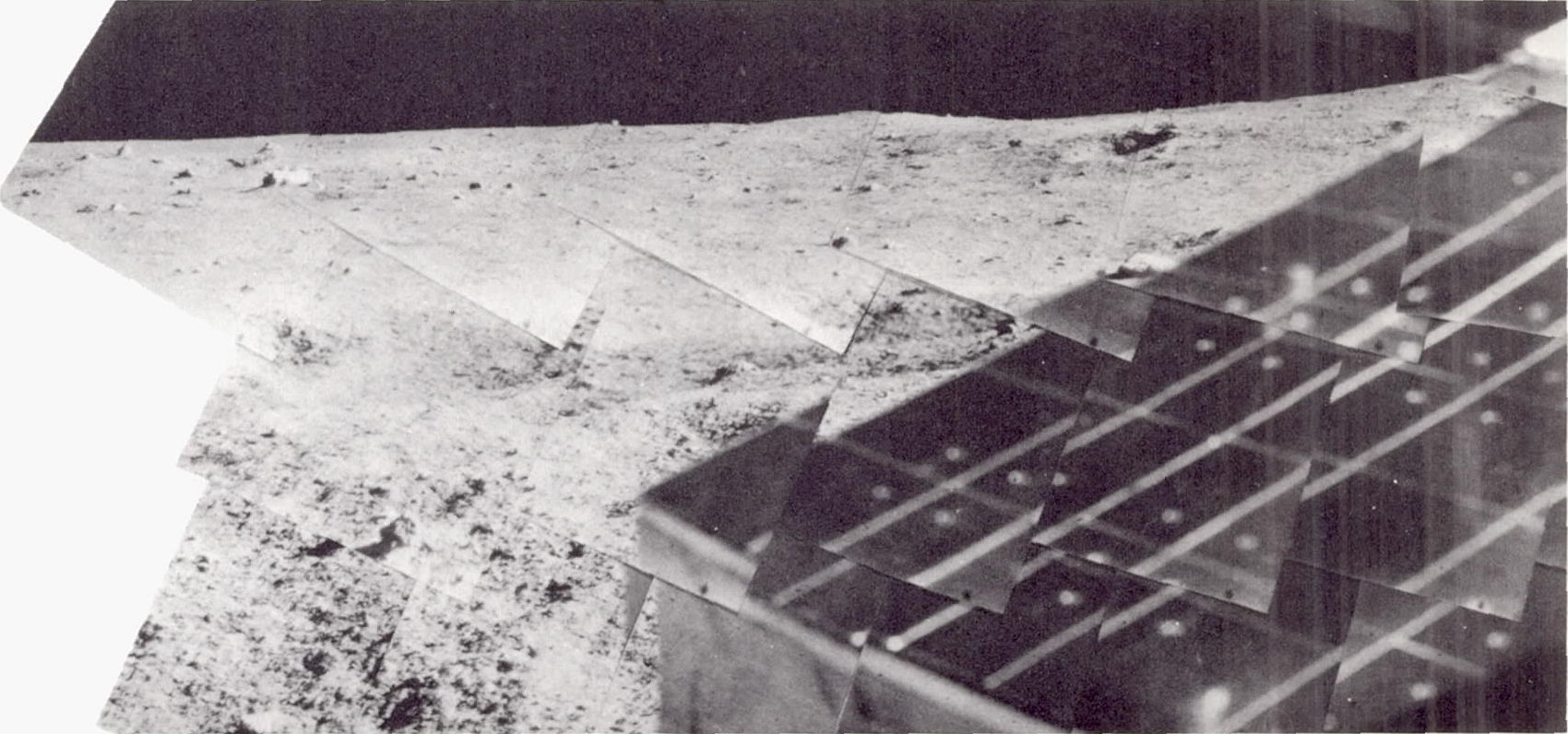
Lunar surface imaged by Surveyor 5

Surveyor 5 was launched on September 8, 1967 from Cape Canaveral. It landed on Mare Tranquillitatis on September 11, 1967. The spacecraft transmitted excellent data for all experiments from shortly after touchdown until October 18, 1967, with an interval of no transmission from September 24 to October 15, 1967, during the first lunar night. Transmissions were received until November 1, 1967, when shutdown for the second lunar night occurred. Transmissions were resumed on the third and fourth lunar days, with the final transmission occurring on December 17, 1967. A total of 19,118 images were transmitted to Earth.

=== Surveyor 6 ===
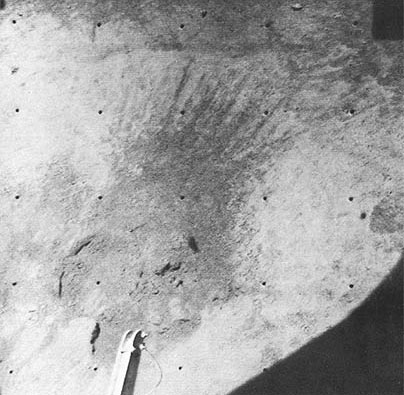
Surveyor 6 effects of the vernier-rocket engine blast on the double imprint previously made in the lunar surface by one of the spacecraft's crushable blocks during the initial touchdown

Surveyor 6 was the first spacecraft planned to lift off from the Moon's surface.

It was launched on November 7, 1967, and landed on November 10, 1967 in Sinus Medii (near the crash site of Surveyor 4). The successful completion of this mission satisfied the Surveyor program's obligation to the Apollo project.

Surveyor 6's engines were restarted and burned for 2.5 seconds in the first lunar liftoff on November 17 at 10:32 UTC. This created 150 lbf (700 N) of thrust and lifted the vehicle 12 feet (4 m) from the lunar surface. After moving west eight feet, (2.5 m) the spacecraft once again successfully soft landed and continued functioning as designed. On November 24, 1967, the spacecraft was shut down for the two-week lunar night. Contact was made on December 14, 1967, but no useful data was obtained.

=== Surveyor 7 ===
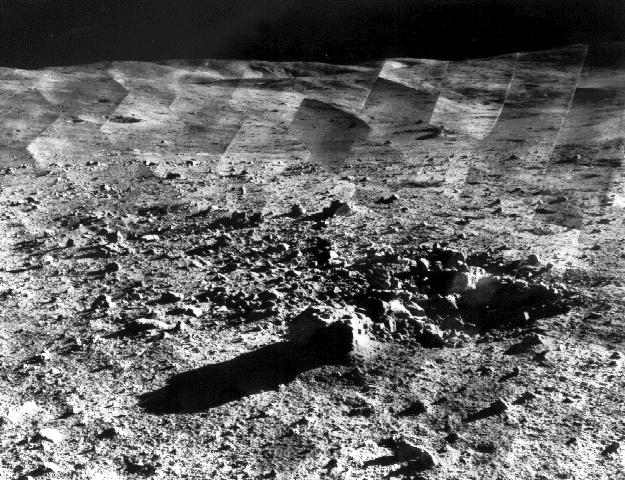
Photomosaic of lunar panorama near the Tycho crater taken by Surveyor 7. The hills on the center horizon are about eight miles away from the spacecraft.

Surveyor 7 was launched on January 7, 1968, landing on the lunar surface on January 10, 1968, on the outer rim of the crater Tycho. Operations of the spacecraft began shortly after the soft landing. On January 20, while the craft was still in daylight, the TV camera clearly saw two laser beams aimed at it from the night side of the crescent Earth, one from Kitt Peak National Observatory, Tucson, Arizona, and the other at Table Mountain at Wrightwood, California.

Operations on the second lunar day occurred from February 12 to 21, 1968. The mission objectives were fully satisfied by the spacecraft operations. Battery damage was suffered during the first lunar night and transmission contact was subsequently sporadic. Contact with Surveyor 7 was lost on February 21, 1968.

== Surveyor mission list ==
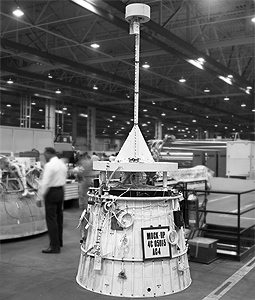
Surveyor-Model 1: A 952 kg mass representative for the Surveyor lunar probe. The cylindrical mass was permanently connected to the Centaur upper stage.

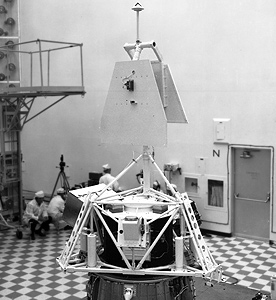
Surveyor-SD 2. Simulated Surveyor payload with the same dynamic properties as the real probe.

Surveyor-Model were generic mass simulators, while Surveyor SD had the same structure as the real Surveyor landers with all equipment replaced by dummy weights. These served to test Atlas-Centaur launch vehicle performance, and were not intended to reach the Moon.

Of the seven Surveyor missions, five were successful.

Mission	Launch	Rocket	Arrived at Moon	Disposition
Surveyor-Model 1	December 11, 1964	Atlas-LV3C Centaur-C AC-4	-	165 × 178 km Earth orbit
Surveyor SD-1	March 02, 1965	Atlas-LV3C Centaur-C AC-5	-	destroyed on launch
Surveyor SD-2	August 11, 1965	Atlas-LV3C Centaur-D AC-6	-	166 × 815085 km Earth orbit
Surveyor-Model 2	April 08, 1966	Atlas-LV3C Centaur-D AC-8	-	175 × 343 km Earth orbit
Surveyor 1	May 30, 1966	Atlas-LV3C Centaur-D AC-10	June 2, 1966	landed on Oceanus Procellarum
Surveyor 2	September 20, 1966	Atlas-LV3C Centaur-D AC-7	September 23, 1966	crashed near Copernicus crater
Surveyor-Model 3	October 26,1966	Atlas-LV3C Centaur-D AC-9	-	165 × 470040 km Earth orbit
Surveyor 3	April 17, 1967	Atlas-LV3C Centaur-D AC-12	April 20, 1967	landed on Oceanus Procellarum
Surveyor 4	July 14, 1967	Atlas-LV3C Centaur-D AC-11	July 17, 1967	crashed on Sinus Medii
Surveyor 5	September 8, 1967	Atlas-SLV3C Centaur-D AC-13	September 11, 1967	landed on Mare Tranquillitatis
Surveyor 6	November 7, 1967	Atlas-SLV3C Centaur-D AC-14	November 10, 1967	landed on Sinus Medii
Surveyor 7	January 7, 1968	Atlas-SLV3C Centaur-D AC-15	January 10, 1968	landed near Tycho crater

== Space Race competition ==
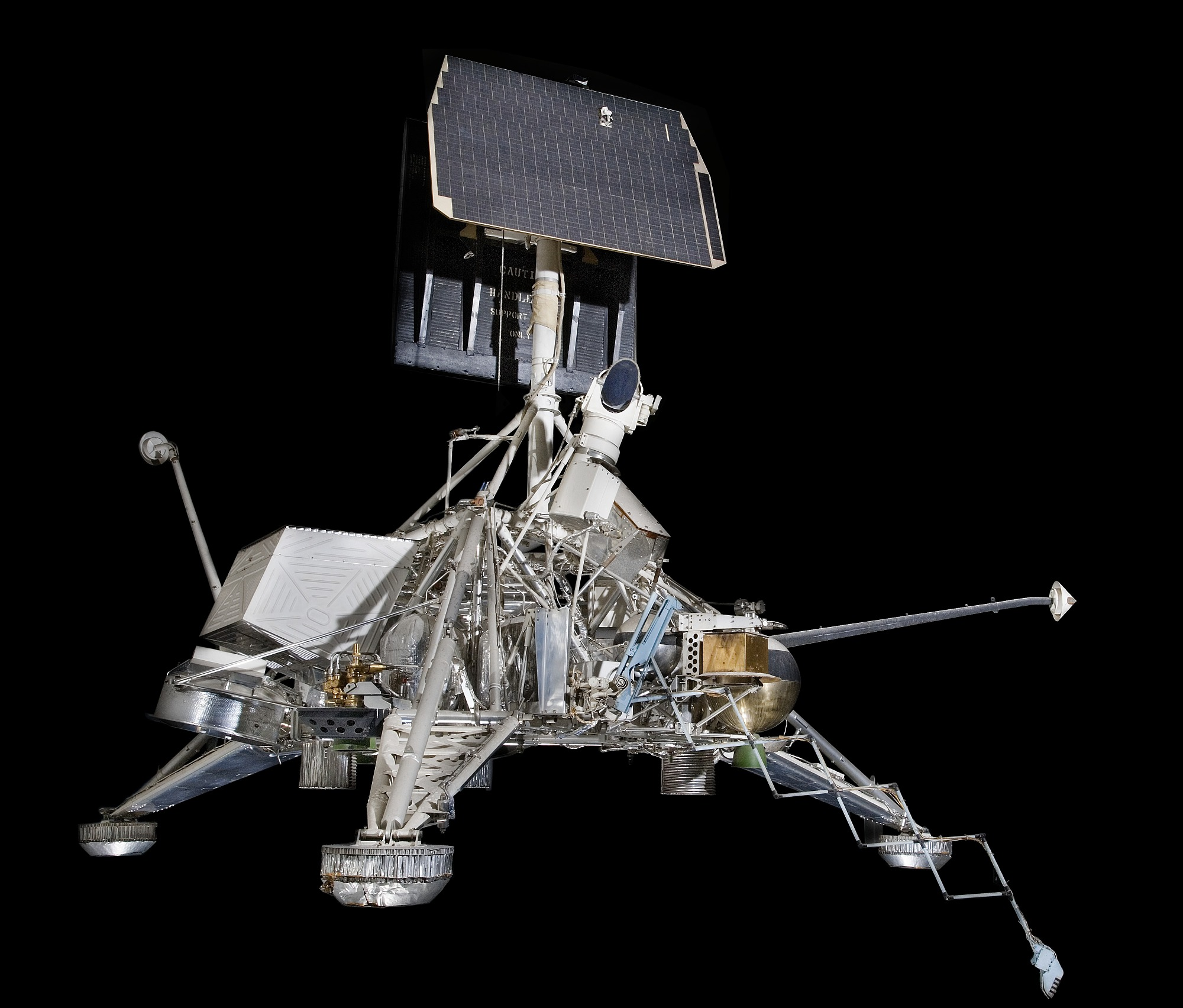
An engineering model of Surveyor 3, S-10, used for thermal control tests. It was reconfigured to represent a flight model of Surveyor 3 or later, since it was the first to have a scoop and claw surface sampler. (National Air and Space Museum)

During the time of the Surveyor missions, the United States was actively involved in the Space Race with the Soviet Union. Thus, the Surveyor 1 landing in June 1966, only four months after the Soviet Luna 9 probe landed in February, was an indication the programs were at similar stages.

== See also ==
- Atlas (rocket family)
- Luna programme
- Lunar Orbiter program
- Ranger program
- Exploration of the Moon
- List of missions to the Moon
