= Kosmos 230 =

Soviet Sun imaging satellite

- Mission type: Solar imaging
- COSPAR ID: 1968-056A
- SATCAT no.: 03308
- Mission duration: 120 days

Spacecraft properties
- Spacecraft type: DS-U3-S
- Manufacturer: Yuzhnoye
- Launch mass: 400 kg

Start of mission
- Launch date: 5 July 1968, 06:59:50 GMT
- Rocket: Kosmos-2I 63SM
- Launch site: Kapustin Yar, Site 86/4
- Contractor: Yuzhnoye

End of mission
- Decay date: 2 November 1968

Orbital parameters
- Reference system: Geocentric
- Regime: Low Earth
- Perigee altitude: 285 km
- Apogee altitude: 543 km
- Inclination: 48.5°
- Period: 93.0 minutes
- Epoch: 5 July 1968

Kosmos 230 (Russian: Космос 230 meaning Cosmos 230), also known as DS-U3-S No.2, was a satellite which was launched by the Soviet Union in 1968 as part of the Dnepropetrovsk Sputnik programme. It was a 400 kilograms (880 lb) spacecraft, which was built by the Yuzhnoye Design Bureau, and was used to conduct multispectral imaging of the Sun.

Kosmos 230 was launched from Site 86/4 at Kapustin Yar, aboard a Kosmos-2I 63SM carrier rocket. The launch occurred at 06:59:50 UTC on 5 July 1968, and resulted in the successful insertion of the satellite into a low Earth orbit. Upon reaching orbit, the satellite was assigned its Kosmos designation, and received the International Designator 1968-056A. The North American Air Defense Command assigned it the catalogue number 03308.

Kosmos 230 was the second of two DS-U3-S satellites to be launched, after Kosmos 166. It was operated in an orbit with a perigee of 285 kilometres (177 mi), an apogee of 543 kilometres (337 mi), an inclination of 48.5°, and an orbital period of 93.0 minutes, until decaying from orbit and reentering the atmosphere on 2 November 1968.

== See also ==
- 1968 in spaceflight
