= Kosmos 173 =

Soviet radar calibration target satellite

- Mission type: ABM radar target
- COSPAR ID: 1967-081A
- SATCAT no.: 02921
- Mission duration: 117 days

Spacecraft properties
- Spacecraft type: DS-P1-Yu
- Manufacturer: Yuzhnoye
- Launch mass: 325 kg

Start of mission
- Launch date: 24 August 1967, 04:59:49 GMT
- Rocket: Kosmos-2I 63SM
- Launch site: Plesetsk, 133/1
- Contractor: Yuzhnoye

End of mission
- Decay date: 17 December 1967

Orbital parameters
- Reference system: Geocentric
- Regime: Low Earth
- Perigee altitude: 277 km
- Apogee altitude: 480 km
- Inclination: 71.0°
- Period: 92.3 minutes
- Epoch: 24 August 1967

Kosmos 173 (Russian: Космос 173 meaning Cosmos 173), also known as DS-P1-Yu No.8 was a Soviet satellite which was used as a radar calibration target for tests of anti-ballistic missiles. It was a 325 kilograms (717 lb) spacecraft, was built by the Yuzhnoye, and launched in 1967 as part of the Dnepropetrovsk Sputnik programme.

A Kosmos-2I 63SM carrier rocket was used to launch Kosmos 173 from Site 133/1 at Plesetsk Cosmodrome. The launch occurred at 04:59:49 GMT on 24 August 1967, and resulted in Kosmos 173's successful deployment into low Earth orbit.

Kosmos 173 was operated in an orbit with a perigee of 277 kilometres (172 mi), an apogee of 480 kilometres (300 mi), an inclination of 71.0°, and an orbital period of 92.3 minutes. It remained in orbit until it decayed and reentered the atmosphere on 17 December 1967. It was the ninth of seventy nine DS-P1-Yu satellites to be launched, and the eighth of seventy two to successfully reach orbit.

== See also ==
- 1967 in spaceflight
