= Surveyor 6 =

NASA lunar lander

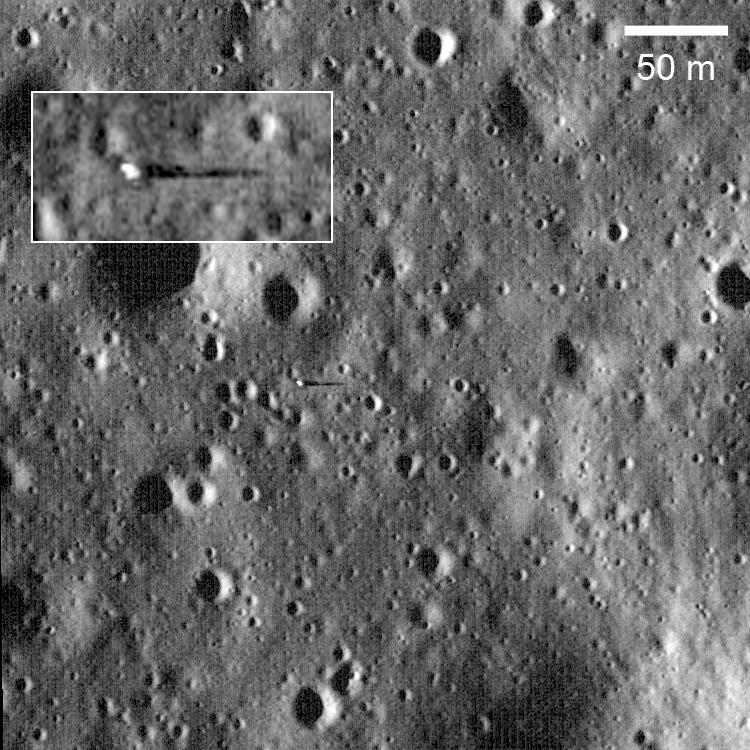
- Surveyor 6 casting 18-meter long shadow with Sun just 8° above the horizon, LROC image taken in 2010
- Mission type: Lunar lander
- Operator: NASA
- COSPAR ID: 1967-112A
- SATCAT no.: 03031
- Mission duration: 37 days (launch to last contact)

Spacecraft properties
- Manufacturer: Hughes Aircraft
- Launch mass: 1,008.3 kilograms (2,223 lb)
- Landing mass: 299.6 kilograms (661 lb) after landing

Start of mission
- Launch date: November 7, 1967, 07:39:01 UTC
- Rocket: Atlas SLV-3C Centaur-D AC-14
- Launch site: Cape Canaveral LC-36B

End of mission
- Last contact: December 14, 1967; last useful data November 24

Lunar lander
- Landing date: November 10, 1967, 01:01:06 UTC
- Return launch: November 17, 1967, 10:32 UTC
- Landing site: 0.47430°N 1.4275°W

Lunar lander
- Landing date: November 17, 1967
- Landing site: 2.5 metres (8 ft 2 in) west of original landing site

Surveyor 6 is the sixth lunar lander of the American uncrewed Surveyor program that reached the surface of the Moon. Surveyor 6 landed on the Sinus Medii. A total of 30,027 images were transmitted to Earth.

This spacecraft is the fourth of the Surveyor series to successfully achieve a soft landing on the Moon, obtain post landing television pictures, determine the abundance of the chemical elements in the lunar soil, obtain touchdown dynamics data, obtain thermal and radar reflectivity data, and conduct a Vernier engine erosion experiment.

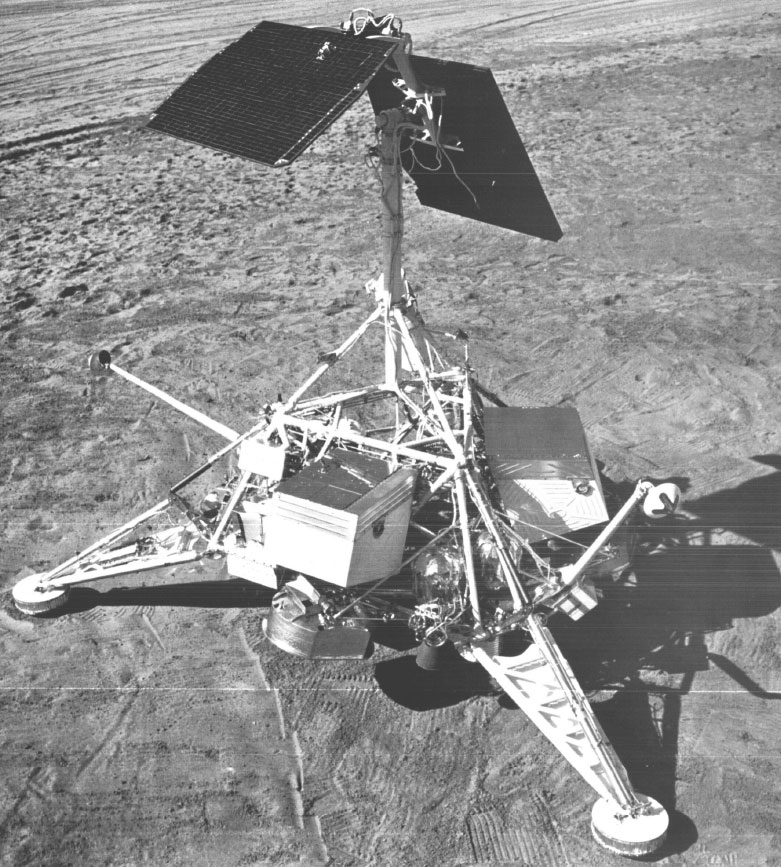
Surveyor model on Earth.

Virtually identical to Surveyor 5, this spacecraft carried a television camera, a small bar magnet attached to one footpad, and an alpha-scattering instrument as well as the necessary engineering equipment. It landed on November 10, 1967, in Sinus Medii, 0.49 deg in latitude and 1.40 deg w longitude (selenographic coordinates)–the center of the Moon's visible hemisphere. Landing site imagery places the exact landing location at 0.47430°N 1.4275°W.

The spacecraft accomplished all planned objectives. The successful completion of this mission satisfied the Surveyor program's obligation to the Apollo project. On November 24, 1967, the spacecraft was shut down for the two-week lunar night. Contact was made on December 14, 1967, but no useful data was obtained.

Lunar soil surveys were completed using photographic and alpha particle backscattering methods. A similar instrument, the APXS, was used onboard several Mars missions.

In a further test of space technology, Surveyor 6's engines were restarted and burned for 2.5 seconds in the first lunar liftoff on November 17 at 10:32 UTC. This created 150 lbf (700 N) of thrust and lifted the vehicle 12 feet (4 m) from the lunar surface. After moving west eight feet, (2.5 m) the spacecraft once again successfully soft landed and continued functioning as designed.

Surveyor 6 landed near the crash site of Surveyor 4, which malfunctioned a few months earlier in July 1967.

== Science experiments ==
=== Television ===
The TV camera consisted of a vidicon tube, 25 and 100 mm focal length lenses, shutters, polarizing filters (as opposed to color filters used on the previous Surveyor cameras), and iris mounted nearly vertically and surmounted by a mirror that could be adjusted by stepping motors to move in both azimuth and elevation. The polarizing filters served as analyzers for the detection of measurement of the linearly polarized component of light scattered from the lunar surface. An auxiliary mirror was used for viewing the lunar surface beneath the spacecraft. The frame by frame coverage of the lunar surface provided a 360 deg azimuth view and an elevation view from approximately +90 deg above the plane normal to the camera z axis to −60 deg below this same plane. Both 600 line and 200 line modes of operation were used. The 200 line mode transmitted over an omnidirectional antenna and scanned one frame each 61.8 seconds. A complete video transmission of each 200 line picture required 20 seconds and utilized a bandwidth of 1.2 kHz. Most transmissions consisted of the 600 line pictures, which were telemetered by a directional antenna.

The frames were scanned each 3.6 seconds. Each frame required nominally one second to be read from the vidicon and utilized a 220 kHz bandwidth for transmission. The optical surfaces were the cleanest of any mission because of a redesigned mirror hood. The television images were displayed on a slow scan monitor coated with a long persistence phosphor. The persistence was selected to optimally match the nominal maximum frame rate. One frame of TV identification was received for each incoming TV frame and was displayed in real time at a rate compatible with that of the incoming image. These data were recorded on a video magnetic tape recorder and on 70 mm film. The camera performance was excellent in terms of both the quantity and quality of pictures. Between lunar landing, lunar 'second' landing, and the lunar first day sunset on November 24, 1967, 29,914 pictures were taken and transmitted.

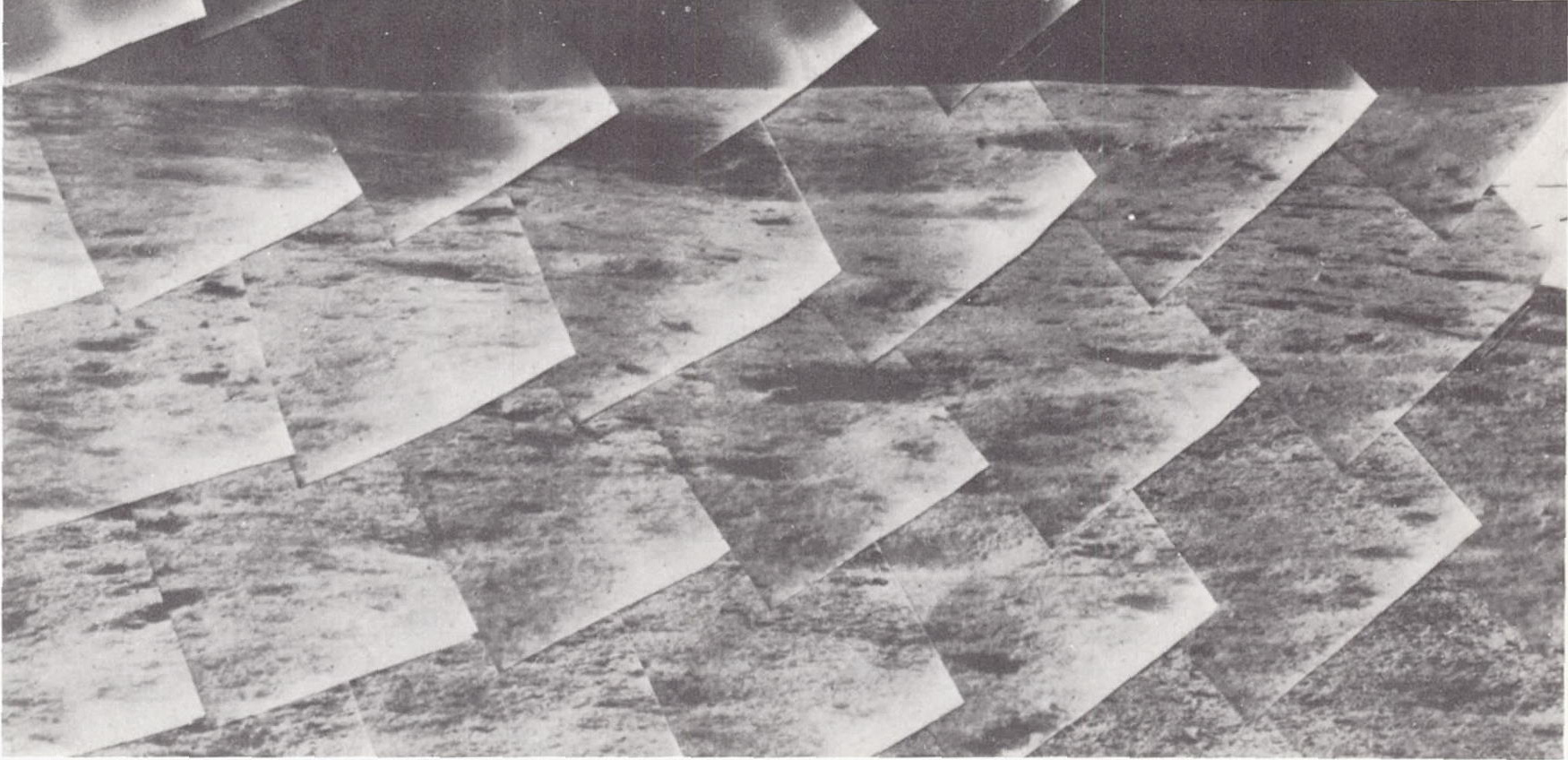
The mare surface

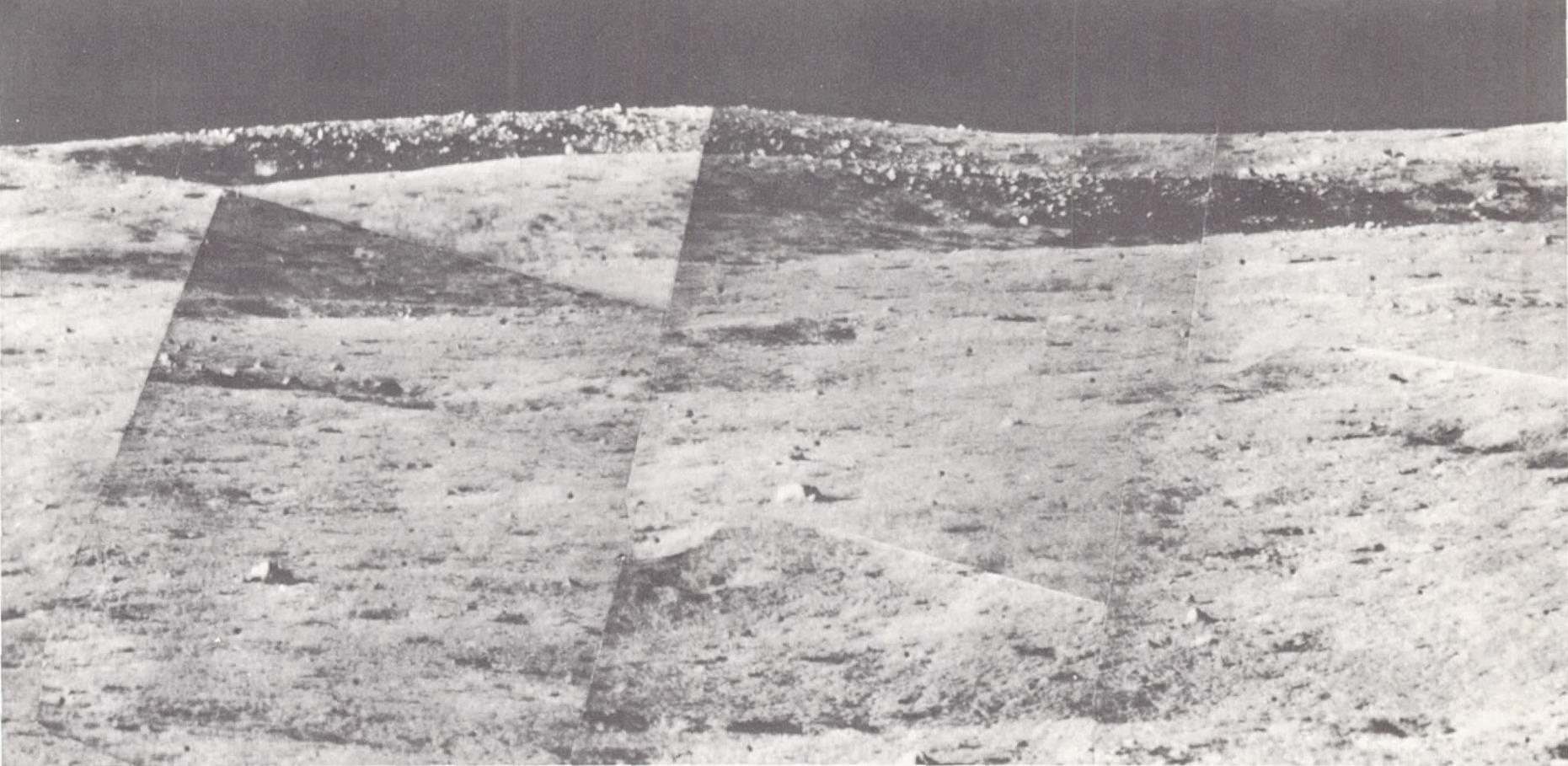
Another view of the mare surface

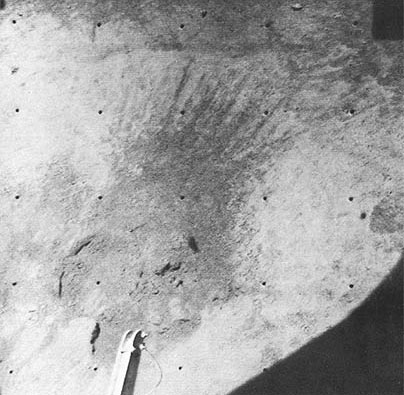
Effects of the vernier-rocket engine blast on the double imprint previously made in the lunar surface by one of the spacecraft's crushable blocks during the initial touchdown.

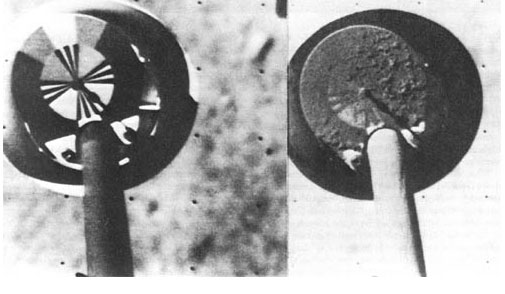
Effects of the vernier-rocket engine blast (before/after).

=== Alpha-Scattering Surface Analyzer ===
The alpha-scattering surface analyzer was designed to measure directly the abundances of the major elements of the lunar surface. The instrumentation consisted of an alpha source (curium 242) collimated to irradiate a 100 mm (3.94 in) diameter opening in the bottom of the instrument where the sample was located and two parallel but independent charged particle detector systems. One system, containing two sensors, detected the energy spectra of the alpha particles scattered from the lunar surface, and the other, containing four sensors, detected energy spectra of the protons produced via reactions (alpha and protons) in the surface material. Each detector assembly was connected to a pulse height analyzer.

A digital electronics package, located in a compartment on the spacecraft, continuously telemetered signals to Earth whenever the experiment was operating. The spectra contained quantitative information on all major elements in the samples except for hydrogen, helium, and lithium. Curium collected on the collimator films and was scattered by the gold plating on the inside bottom of the sensor head. This resulted in a gradually increasing background and reduction of the sensitivity technique for heavy elements. One proton detector was turned off during the second day of operation because of noise. A total of 43 hours of data was obtained from November 11 to 24, 1967. The final data was obtained 4 hours after local sunset. However, after the spacecraft 'hopping' maneuver on November 17, 1967, the sensor head was upside down. Measurements were continued in order to obtain information on solar protons and cosmic rays. Therefore, data for the purpose of the chemical analysis of lunar surface material were obtained only during the first 30 hours of operation. During this period, 27 hours and 44 min of data were known to be noise free.

=== Accomplishments ===
Surveyor 6 was the first spacecraft to lift off from another celestial body. It was monitored by the Jet Propulsion Laboratory in Pasadena. It used its liquid-fueled vernier engines to lift itself from its original landing site to a position some 10 feet away.

This was later noted by the Mars Geyser Hopper mission as a post-soft landing propulsive hop that pre-dated its proposal.

== See also ==
- List of artificial objects on the Moon
- List of missions to the Moon
