= Surveyor 5 =

NASA lunar probe

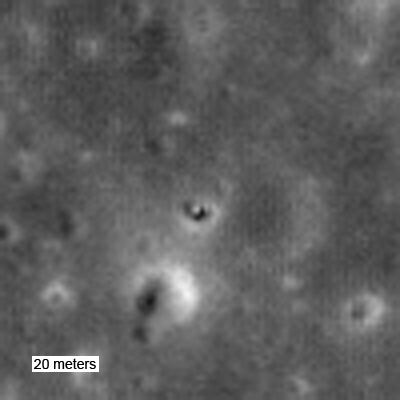
- Surveyor 5 sitting in a 10 meter diameter crater, LROC NAC image
- Mission type: Lunar lander
- Operator: NASA
- COSPAR ID: 1967-084A
- SATCAT no.: 02937
- Mission duration: 3 months, 9 days (launch to last contact)

Spacecraft properties
- Manufacturer: Hughes Aircraft
- Launch mass: 1,006 kilograms (2,218 lb)
- Landing mass: 303 kilograms (668 lb)

Start of mission
- Launch date: September 8, 1967, 07:57:01 UTC
- Rocket: Atlas SLV-3C Centaur-D AC-13
- Launch site: Cape Canaveral LC-36B

End of mission
- Last contact: December 17, 1967

Lunar lander
- Landing date: September 11, 1967, 00:46:44 UTC
- Landing site: 1.41°N 23.18°E (Mare Tranquillitatis)

Surveyor 5 is the fifth lunar lander of the American uncrewed Surveyor program sent to explore the surface of the Moon. Surveyor 5 landed on Mare Tranquillitatis in 1967. A total of 19,118 images were transmitted to Earth.

== Mission ==
The mission experienced a helium leak in the system that pressurized the liquid-fuel vernier engines that could have resulted in failure. An improvised landing sequence which started the retrorocket just 42 km above the Moon (about half the usual height) allowed the vernier engines to bring the craft down in 106 seconds from a height of only 1340 m (about 10% of the usual). This brought the craft down with a helium pressure on the edge of what would have shut the engines down from lack of pressure.

The landing, however, was successful, and data was received for two weeks after the landing. A miniature chemical analysis lab using an alpha particle backscatter device was used to determine the lunar surface soil consisted of basaltic rock. A similar instrument, the APXS, was used onboard several Mars missions.

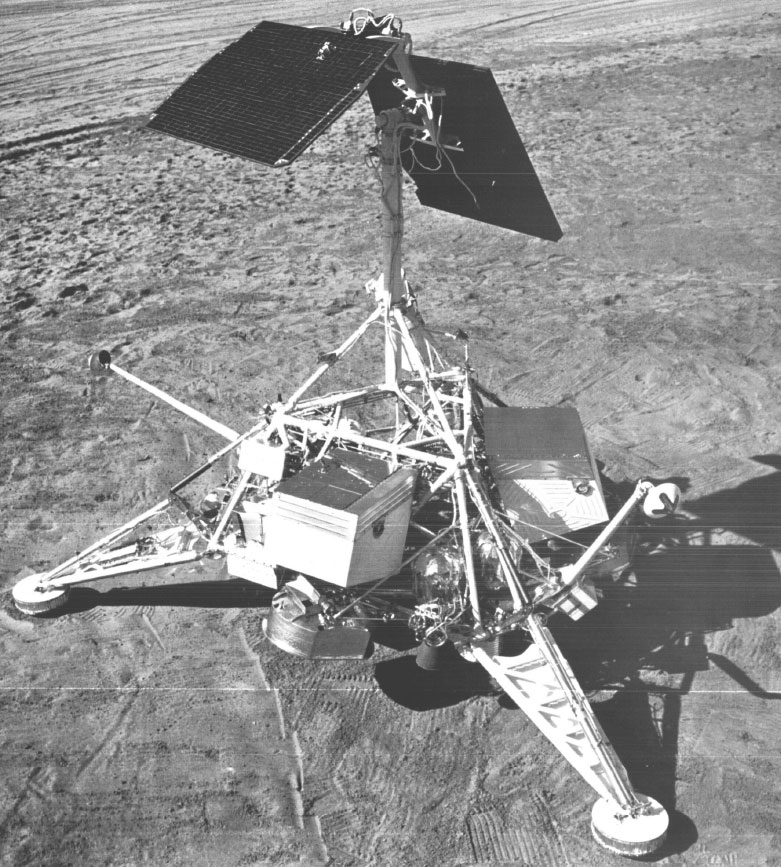
Surveyor model on Earth.

Surveyor 5 was the third spacecraft in the Surveyor series to achieve a successful lunar soft landing. The spacecraft had a basic triangular structure of aluminum tubing that provided mounting surfaces for engineering and scientific equipment. The objectives were to obtain postlanding television pictures of the lunar surface, conduct a Vernier engine erosion experiment, determine the relative abundance of the chemical elements in the lunar soil, obtain touchdown dynamics data, and obtain thermal and radar reflectivity data.

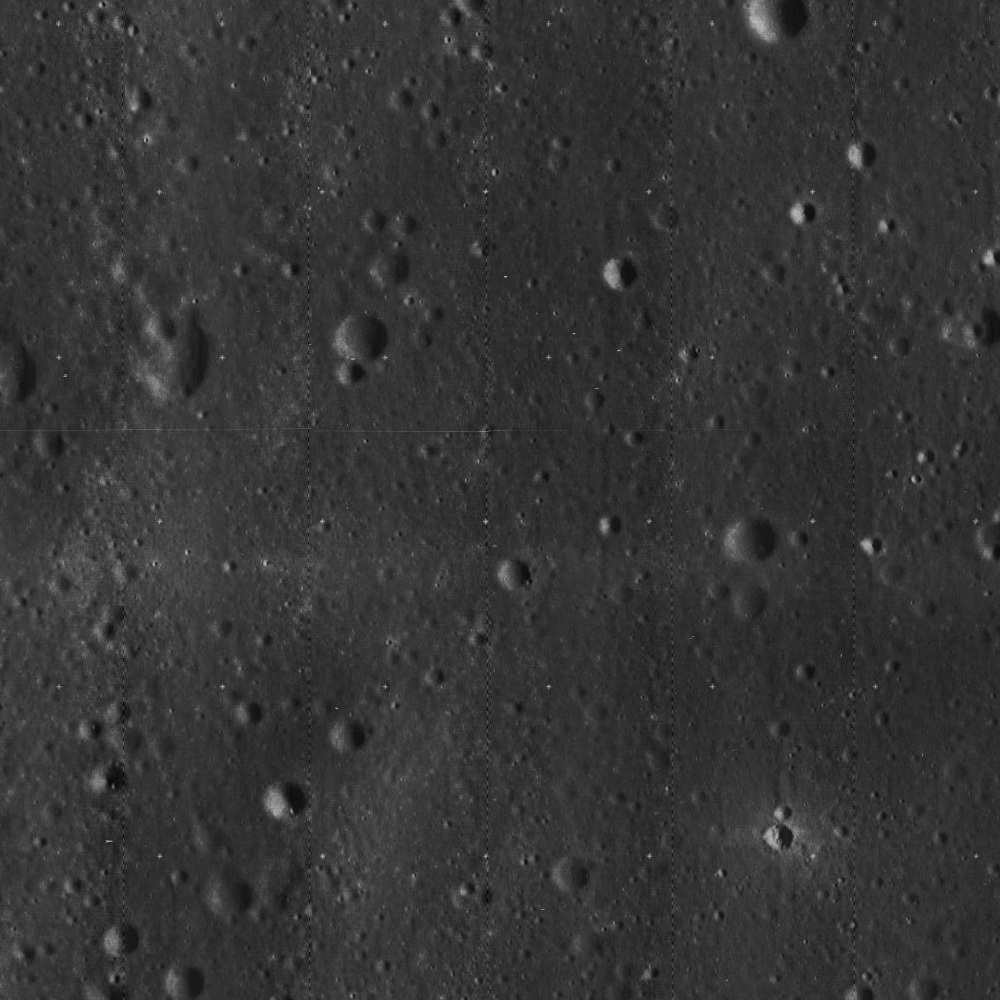
Lunar Orbiter 5 image centered on the landing site. Width is 17.2 km.

Instrumentation for this spacecraft was similar to that of the previous Surveyors and included landing legs, a Vernier propulsion system, and numerous engineering sensors. An alpha-scattering instrument was installed in place of the surface sampler, and a small bar magnet attached to one footpad was included to detect the presence of magnetic material in the lunar soil. The spacecraft landed at 00:46:44 UT on September 11, 1967 (7:46 p.m. EST September 10) in Mare Tranquillitatis, at 1.41° N latitude and 23.18° E longitude (selenographic coordinates), within the rimless edge of a small crater on a slope of about 20 deg. The spacecraft transmitted excellent data for all experiments from shortly after touchdown until October 18, 1967, with an interval of no transmission from September 24 to October 15, 1967, during the first lunar night. Transmissions were received until November 1, 1967, when shutdown for the second lunar night occurred. Transmissions were resumed on the third and fourth lunar days, with the final transmission occurring on December 17, 1967. Pictures were transmitted during the first, second, and fourth lunar days. Less than two years later the first crewed landing, Apollo 11, would land 25 km south-southwest of Surveyor 5.

== Launch ==
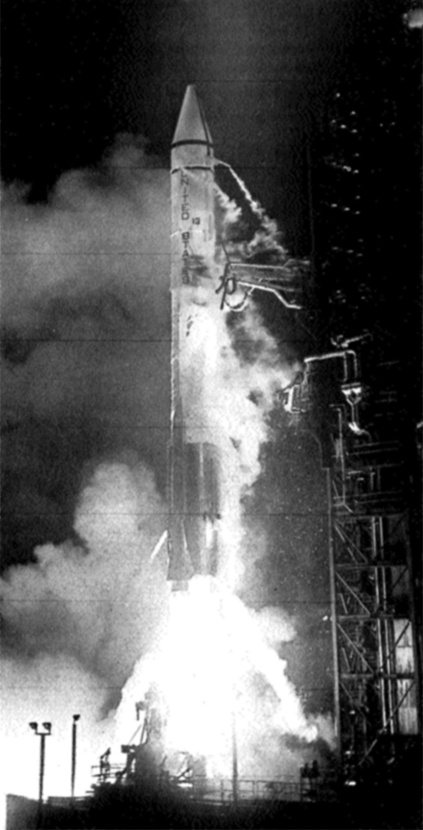
Centaur AC-13 launching Surveyor 5

Surveyor 5 was launched on the Atlas-Centaur rocket on September 8, 1967 from Cape Canaveral.

== Science instruments ==
=== Television ===
The TV camera consisted of a vidicon tube, 25 and 100 mm focal length lenses, shutters, clear, red, green and blue optical filters, and iris mounted along an axis inclined approximately 16° to the central axis of the spacecraft. The camera was mounted under a mirror that could be moved in azimuth and elevation. Camera operation was totally dependent upon receipt of the proper command structure from Earth. Frame by frame coverage of the lunar surface was obtained over 360° in azimuth and from +40° above the plane normal to the camera z-axis to 65° below this plane. Both 600-line and 200-line modes of operation were used. The 200-line mode transmitted over an omnidirectional antenna and scanned one frame each 61.8 seconds. A complete video transmission of each 200-line picture required 20 seconds and utilized a bandwidth of 1.2 kHz. Most transmissions consisted of the 600-line pictures, which were telemetered by a directional antenna. These frames were scanned each 3.6 seconds. Each 600-line picture required nominally 1 second to be read from the vidicon and utilized a 220 kHz bandwidth for transmission.

The television images were displayed on a slow scan monitor coated with a long persistency phosphor. The persistency was selected to optimally match the nominal maximum frame rate. One frame of TV identification was received for each incoming TV frame and was displayed in real time at a rate compatible with that of the incoming image. These data were recorded on a video magnetic tape recorder and on 70 mm film. During the first lunar day, which ended on September 24, 1967, 18,006 high quality television pictures were transmitted. After being shut down during the lunar night, more than 20 days, the camera responded to commands and transmitted an additional 1,048 pictures between October 15 and 23, 1967. Another 64 pictures were transmitted on the fourth lunar day, but the quality of pictures taken after the first lunar day was poor due to camera degradation resulting from the lunar night temperatures.

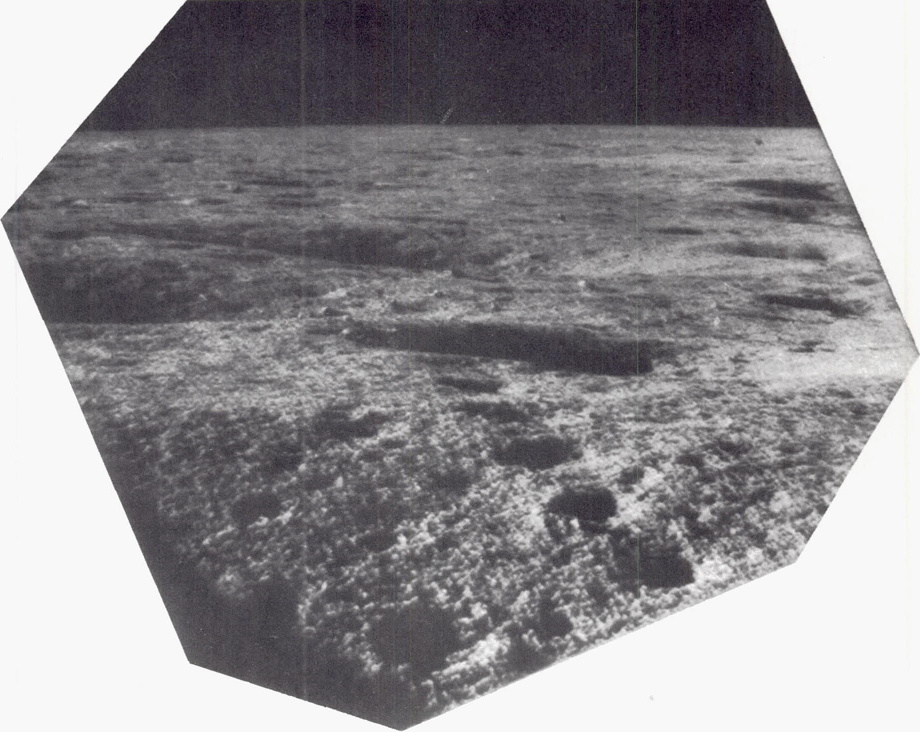
Wide-angle picture of the northwest wall of the Surveyor 5 crater

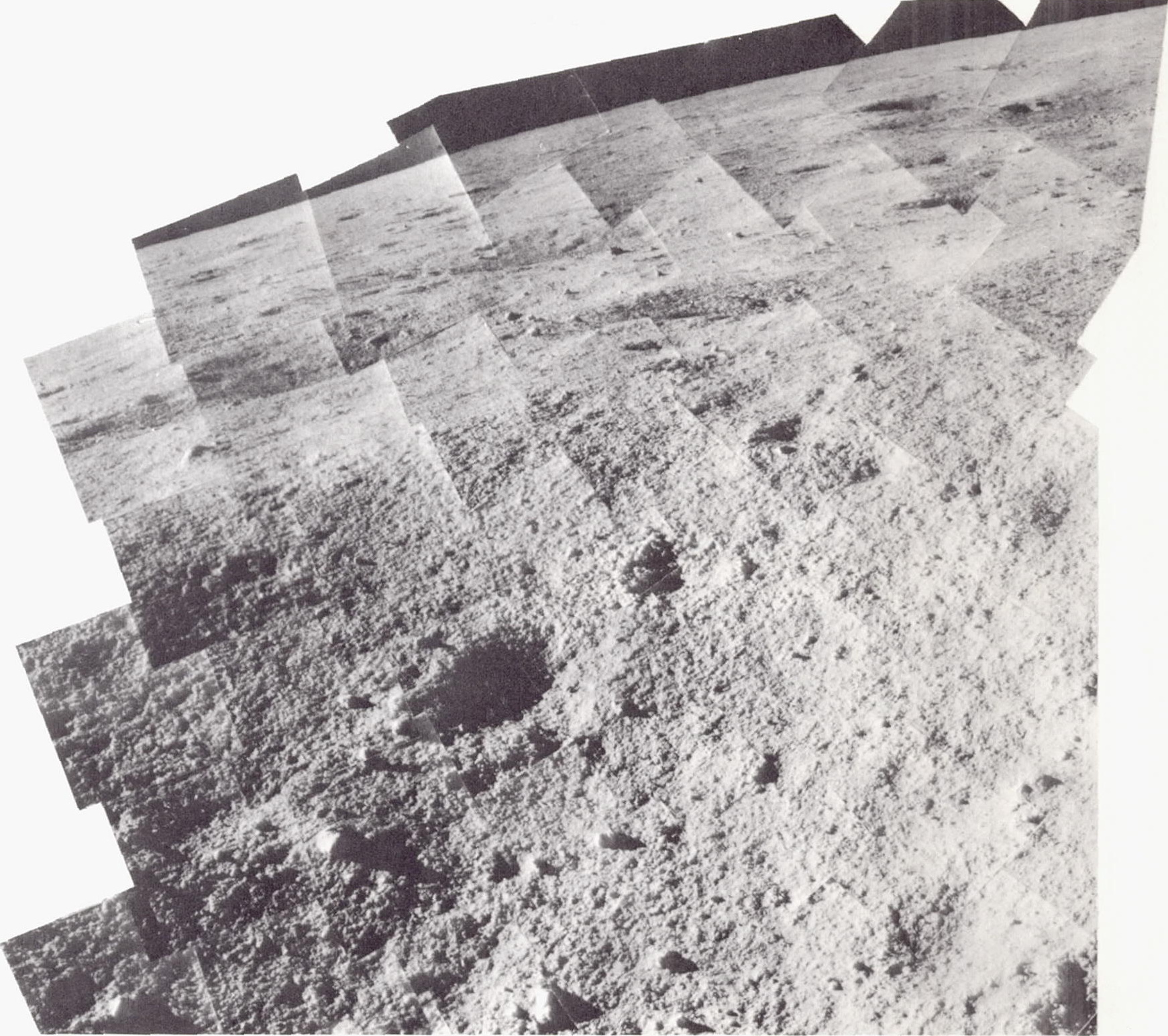
Panorama of the mare surface

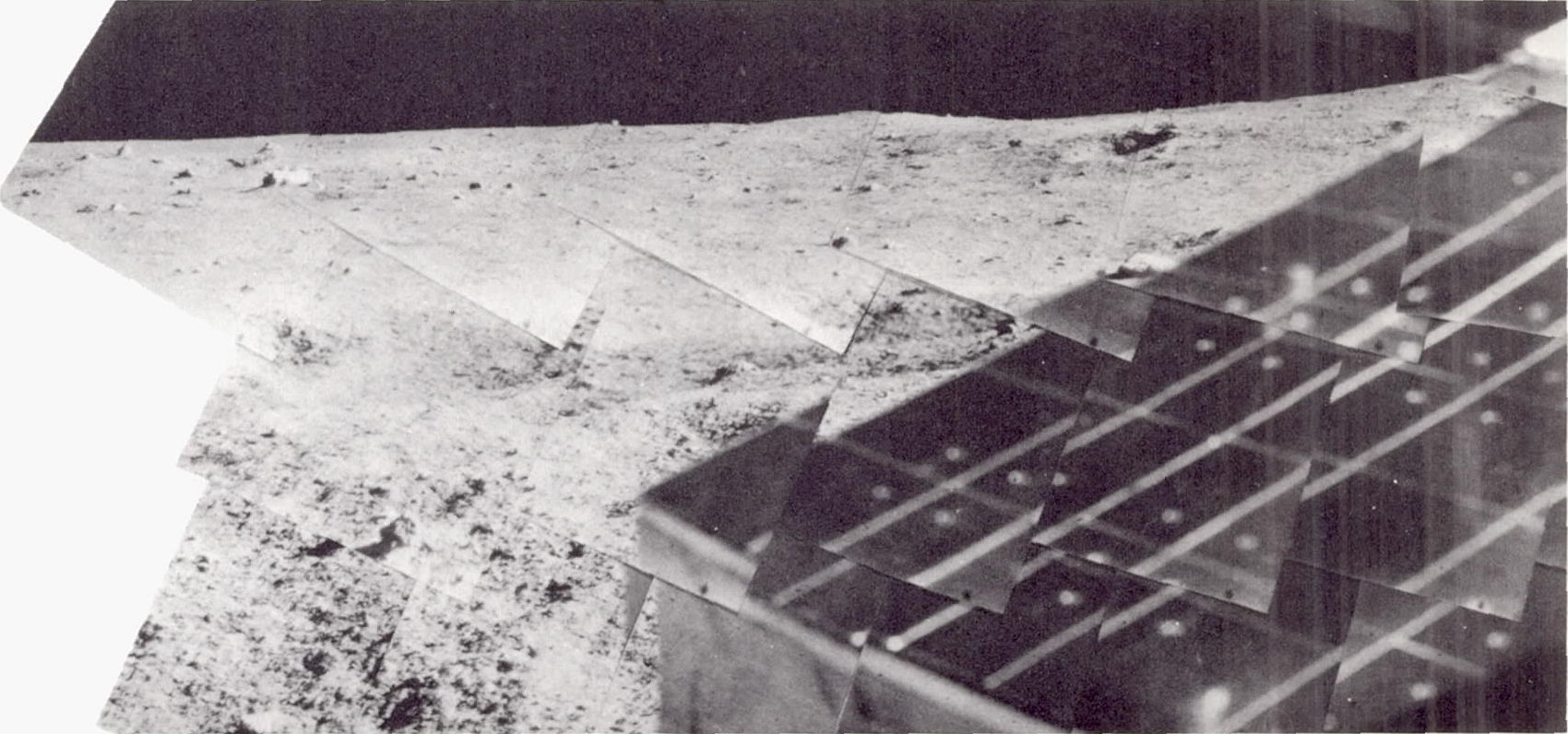
Another panorama

=== Alpha-scattering surface analyzer ===
The alpha-scattering surface analyzer was designed to measure directly the abundances of the major elements of the lunar surface. The instrumentation consisted of six alpha sources (curium 242) collimated to irradiate a 100 mm diameter opening in the bottom of the instrument where the sample was located and two parallel but independent charged particle detector systems. One system, containing two sensors, detected the energy spectra of the alpha particles scattered from the lunar surface, and the other, containing four sensors, detected energy spectra of the protons produced via reactions (alpha and proton) in the surface material. Each detector assembly was connected to a pulse height analyzer. A digital electronics package, located in a compartment on the spacecraft, continuously telemetered signals to earth whenever the experiment was operating. The spectra contained quantitative information on all major elements in the samples except for hydrogen, helium, and lithium. The experiment provided 83 hours of high quality data during the first lunar day. The results indicated a surface composition of basalt similar to that found on various places on earth. During the second lunar day, 22 hours of data were accumulated. However, detector noise posed a problem in the reduction of data from this second day.

== See also ==
- List of artificial objects on the Moon
- List of missions to the Moon
