= OV3-5 =

US Air Force satellite

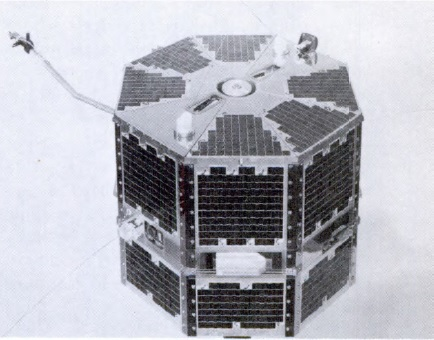
- OV3-5
- Mission type: Earth science
- Operator: USAF
- COSPAR ID: 1967-F01
- SATCAT no.: F00414

Spacecraft properties
- Manufacturer: Space General
- Launch mass: 94 kg (207 lb)

Start of mission
- Launch date: 31 January 1967 12:45:01 UTC
- Rocket: Scout B
- Launch site: Vandenberg Space Launch Complex 5

Orbiting Vehicle 3-5 (also known as OV3-5 and ATmospheric COmposition Satellite or ATCOS), launched 31 January 1967, was the fifth satellite to be launched in the OV3 series of the United States Air Force's Orbiting Vehicle program.

== History ==
The Orbiting Vehicle satellite program arose from a US Air Force initiative, begun in the early 1960s, to reduce the expense of space research. Through this initiative, satellites would be standardized to improve reliability and cost-efficiency, and where possible, they would fly on test vehicles or be piggybacked with other satellites. In 1961, the Air Force Office of Aerospace Research (OAR) created the Aerospace Research Support Program (ARSP) to request satellite research proposals and choose mission experiments. The USAF Space and Missiles Organization created their own analog of the ARSP called the Space Experiments Support Program (SESP), which sponsored a greater proportion of technological experiments than the ARSP. Five distinct OV series of standardized satellites were developed under the auspices of these agencies.

Unlike the previously initiated OV1 and OV2 series of satellites, which were designed to use empty payload space on rocket test launches, the six OV3 satellites all had dedicated Scout boosters. In this regard, the OV3 series was more akin to its civilian science program counterparts (e.g. Explorer). OV3 differed from NASA programs in its heavy use of off-the-shelf equipment, which resulted in lower unit cost.

The first four satellites in the series were made the Aerojet subsidiary Space General Corporation under a $1.35m contract awarded 2 December 1964, the first satellite due October 1965. The last two satellites were built by Air Force Cambridge Research Laboratory (AFCRL), which also managed the entire series and provided four of the OV3 payloads.

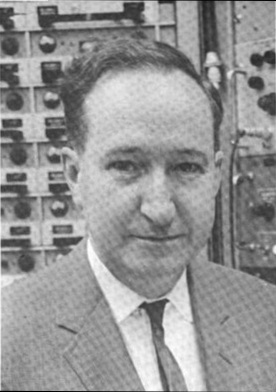
Charles H. Reynolds, Technical Manager of OV3

Charles H. Reynolds, who worked at AFCRL from 1955, was the technical manager for the OV3 program.

Prior to the launch of OV3-5, four other OV3 satellites had been placed into orbit, all radiation measuring spacecraft launched in 1966.

== Spacecraft design ==
Like the rest of the OV3 satellites, OV3-5 was an octagonal prism. However, its length was reduced from .74 m (2 ft 5 in) to .53 m (1 ft 9 in). Experiments were mounted on booms, and 2560 solar cells provided 30 Watts of power. Its design life-span was eight months owing to the low planned orbit. The satellite massed 94 kg (207 lb)

== Experiments ==
OV3-5 carried an aeronomy payload produced by AFCRL. It comprised two mass spectrometers, one designed to analyze the neutral constituents of the high atmosphere, the other to measure its ionized components. Three cold-cathode ionization gauges were to be employed for determining atmospheric density. These latter were mounted along the spin axis of the satellite to better detect small-scale variations in density than previous, radially mounted experiments. Two boom-mounted rf impedance probes, for measuring electron temperature and density, rounded out the package.

== Mission ==
Launched from Vandenberg Space Launch Complex 5 on 31 January 1967 at 12:45:01 UTC via Scout B rocket, OV3-5 was lost seven minutes into its flight. A graphite nozzle insert in the Scout rocket's final stage failed, and the stage exploded, causing the loss of the satellite.

== Legacy ==
OV3-6, essentially a duplicate of OV3-5, successfully launched on 4 December 1967. The OV3 program was terminated following OV3-6 in favor of the cheaper OV1 program. Thus, The OV3 program ultimately comprised 6 missions, five of them successful.
