= Saburovo =

Saburovo Сабурово
- Village
- Location within Bashkortostan Location within Russia
- Coordinates: 54°25′N 55°46′E
- Country: Russia
- Region: Bashkortostan
- District: Chishminsky District
- Time zone: UTC+5:00

Saburovo (Russian: Сабурово; Bashkir: Һабыр, Habır) is a rural locality (a village) in Yengalyshevsky Selsoviet, Chishminsky District, Bashkortostan, Russia. The population was 43 as of 2010. There are 8 streets.

== Geography ==
Saburovo lies 52 km southeast of Chishmy, the district's administrative centre. Beketovo is the nearest rural locality.
