= List of Kosmos satellites (1–250) =

The designation Kosmos (Russian: Космос meaning Cosmos) is a generic name given to a large number of Soviet, and subsequently Russian, satellites, the first of which was launched in 1962. Satellites given Kosmos designations include military spacecraft, failed probes to the Moon and the planets, prototypes for crewed spacecraft, and scientific spacecraft. This is a list of satellites with Kosmos designations between 1 and 250.

| Designation | Type | Launch date (GMT) | Carrier rocket | Function | Decay/Destruction* | Remarks |
|---|---|---|---|---|---|---|
| Kosmos 1 | DS-2 | 16 March 1962; 11:59 | Kosmos 63S1 | Radio technology used to study structure of Ionosphere | 25 May 1962 | Kapustin Yar launch. Orbit 217 x 980 km. Inclination 49 degrees. Weight-possibly 200 kg. Initially classified as Sputnik 11. DS-2 #1, first of two DS-2 satellites |
| Kosmos 2 | 1MS | 6 April 1962; 17:15 | Kosmos 63S1 | Radioed data on Radiation Belts and Cosmic Rays. | 20 August 1963 | Kapustin Yar launch. Orbit 212 x 1560 km. Inclination 49 degrees. Weight-possibly 400 kg. Initially classified as Sputnik 12. |
| Kosmos 3 | 2MS | 24 April 1962; 04:00 | Kosmos 63S1 | Radioed data on Radiation Belts and Cosmic Rays. | 17 October 1962 | Kapustin Yar launch. Orbit 228 x 719 km. Inclination 49 degrees. Weight-possibly 400 kg. |
| Kosmos 4 | Zenit-2 | 26 April 1962; 10:02 | Vostok-K 8K72K | Military reconnaissance. Measure radiation before and after US nuclear tests. | 29 April 1962 | Baikonur launch. Orbit 298 x 330 km. Inclination 65 degrees. 5m x 2m dimensions. Weight-about 4 tonnes. First military satellite. First spacecraft to be recovered. orientation system malfunctioned |
| Kosmos 5 | 2MS | 28 May 1962; 03:00 | Kosmos 63S1 | Technology, Radiation | 2 May 1963 | |
| Kosmos 6 | DS-P1 | 30 June 1962; 16:00 | Kosmos 63S1 | Radar target | 8 August 1962 | DS-P1 #1, first of four DS-P1 satellites |
| Kosmos 7 | Zenit-2 | 28 July 1962; 09:18 | Vostok-2 8A92 | Checking for solar flares during the crewed Vostok 3 and Vostok 4 flights. | 1 August 1962 | Baikonur launch. Orbit 209 x 368 km. Inclination 65 degrees. Weight possibly 4 tonnes. |
| Kosmos 8 | DS-K-8 | 18 August 1962; 15:00 | Kosmos 63S1 | Technology | 17 August 1963 | DS-K-8 #1, only DS-K-8 satellite |
| Kosmos 9 | Zenit-2 | 27 September 1962; 09:39 | Vostok-2 8A92 | Reconnaissance | 1 October 1962 | |
| Kosmos 10 | Zenit-2 | 17 October 1962; 19:00 | Vostok-2 8A92 | Reconnaissance | 21 October 1962 | |
| Kosmos 11 | DS-A1 | 20 October 1962; 04:00 | Kosmos 63S1 | Technology | 18 May 1964 | DS-A1 #1, first of seven DS-A1 satellites |
| Kosmos 12 | Zenit-2 | 22 December 1962; 09:23 | Vostok-2 8A92 | Reconnaissance | 30 December 1962 | |
| Kosmos 13 | Zenit-2 | 21 March 1963; 08:30 | Vostok-2 8A92 | Reconnaissance | 29 March 1962 | |
| Kosmos 14 | Omega | 13 April 1963; 11:00 | Kosmos 63S1 | Technology | 29 August 1963 | Omega #1, first of two Omega satellites |
| Kosmos 15 | Zenit-2 | 22 April 1963; 08:30 | Vostok-2 8A92 | Reconnaissance | 27 April 1963 | |
| Kosmos 16 | Zenit-2 | 28 April 1963; 08:50 | Vostok-2 8A92 | Reconnaissance | 28 April 1963 | |
| Kosmos 17 | DS-A1 | 22 May 1963; 03:00 | Kosmos 63S1 | Technology | 2 June 1965 | DS-A1 #2, second of seven DS-A1 satellites |
| Kosmos 18 | Zenit-2 | 24 May 1963; 10:33 | Vostok-2 8A92 | Reconnaissance | 2 June 1963 | |
| Kosmos 19 | DS-P1 | 6 August 1963; 06:00 | Kosmos 63S1 | Radar target | 30 March 1964 | DS-P1 #3, third of four DS-P1 satellites |
| Kosmos 20 | Zenit-2 | 18 October 1963; 09:29 | Vostok-2 8A92 | Reconnaissance | 26 October 1963 | |
| Kosmos 21 | 3MV-1 | 11 November 1963; 06:23 | Molniya 8K78 | Venus probe | 14 November 1963 | Left in Earth orbit after launch failure |
| Kosmos 22 | Zenit-4 | 16 November 1963; 10:34 | Voskhod 11A57 | Reconnaissance | 22 November 1963 | |
| Kosmos 23 | Omega | 13 December 1963; 14:15 | Kosmos 63S1 | Technology | 27 March 1964 | Omega #2, second of two Omega satellites |
| Kosmos 24 | Zenit-2 | 19 December 1963; 09:28 | Vostok-2 8A92 | Reconnaissance | 28 December 1963 | |
| Kosmos 25 | DS-P1 | 27 February 1964; 13:26 | Kosmos 63S1 | Radar target | 21 November 1964 | DS-P1 #4, last of four DS-P1 satellites |
| Kosmos 26 | DS-MG | 18 March 1964; 15:07 | Kosmos 63S1 | Technology | 28 September 1964 | DS-MG #1, first of two DS-MG satellites |
| Kosmos 27 | 3MV-1 | 27 March 1964; 03:24 | Molniya-M 8K78M | Venus probe | 29 March 1964 | Left in Earth orbit after launch failure |
| Kosmos 28 | Zenit-2 | 4 April 1964; 09:36 | Vostok-2 8A92 | Reconnaissance | 12 April 1964 | |
| Kosmos 29 | Zenit-2 | 25 April 1964; 10:19 | Vostok-2 8A92 | Reconnaissance | 3 May 1964 | |
| Kosmos 30 | Zenit-4 | 18 May 1964; 09:50 | Voskhod 11A57 | Reconnaissance | 26 May 1964 | |
| Kosmos 31 | DS-MT | 6 June 1964; 06:00 | Kosmos 63S1 | Technology | 20 October 1964 | DS-MT #2, second of three DS-MT satellites |
| Kosmos 32 | Zenit-2 | 10 June 1964; 10:48 | Vostok-2 8A92 | Reconnaissance | 18 June 1964 | |
| Kosmos 33 | Zenit-2 | 23 June 1964; 10:19 | Vostok-2 8A92 | Reconnaissance | 1 July 1964 | |
| Kosmos 34 | Zenit-4 | 1 July 1964; 11:16 | Voskhod 11A57 | Reconnaissance | 9 July 1964 | |
| Kosmos 35 | Zenit-2 | 15 July 1964; 11:31 | Vostok-2 8A92 | Reconnaissance | 23 July 1964 | |
| Kosmos 36 | DS-P1-Yu | 30 July 1964; 03:36 | Kosmos 63S1 | Radar target | 28 February 1965 | DS-P1-Yu #1, first of seventy nine DS-P1-Yu satellites |
| Kosmos 37 | Zenit-2 | 14 August 1964; 09:36 | Vostok-2 8A92 | Reconnaissance | 22 August 1964 | |
| Kosmos 38 | Strela-1 | 18 August 1964; 09:15 | Kosmos-1 65S3 | Communication | 8 November 1964 | |
| Kosmos 39 | Strela-1 | 18 August 1964; 09:15 | Kosmos-1 65S3 | Communication | 17 November 1964 | |
| Kosmos 40 | Strela-1 | 18 August 1964; 09:15 | Kosmos-1 65S3 | Communication | 18 November 1964 | |
| Kosmos 41 | Molniya-1 | 22 August 1964; 07:12 | Molniya 8K78 | Communication | 9 April 2004 | Communication antenna failed to deploy |
| Kosmos 42 | Strela-1 | 22 August 1964; 11:02 | Kosmos 63S1 | Communication | 19 December 1965 | |
| Kosmos 43 | Strela-1 | 22 August 1964; 11:02 | Kosmos 63S1 | Communication | 27 December 1965 | |
| Kosmos 44 | Meteor | 28 August 1964; 16:19 | Vostok-2M 8A92M | Weather | in orbit | |
| Kosmos 45 | Zenit-4 | 13 September 1964; 09:50 | Voskhod 11A57 | Reconnaissance | 18 September 1964 | |
| Kosmos 46 | Zenit-2 | 24 September 1964; 12:00 | Vostok-2 8A92 | Reconnaissance | 2 October 1964 | |
| Kosmos 47 | Voskhod 3KV | 6 October 1964; 07:12 | Voskhod 11A57 | Test | 7 October 1964 | Prototype Voskhod spacecraft |
| Kosmos 48 | Zenit-2 | 14 October 1964; 09:50 | Vostok-2 8A92 | Reconnaissance | 20 October 1964 | |
| Kosmos 49 | DS-MG | 24 October 1964; 05:16 | Kosmos 63S1 | Technology | 21 August 1965 | DS-MG #1, second and last DS-MG satellite |
| Kosmos 50 | Zenit-2 | 28 October 1964; 10:48 | Vostok-2 8A92 | Reconnaissance | 5 November 1964* | Failed to deorbit, self-destructed |
| Kosmos 51 | DS-MT | 9 December 1964; 23:02 | Kosmos 63S1 | Technology | 14 November 1965 | DS-MT #3, last of three DS-MT satellites |
| Kosmos 52 | Zenit-2 | 11 January 1965; 09:36 | Vostok-2 8A92 | Reconnaissance | 19 January 1965 | |
| Kosmos 53 | DS-A1 | 30 January 1965; 09:36 | Kosmos 63S1 | Technology | 12 August 1966 | DS-A1 #5, fifth of seven DS-A1 satellites |
| Kosmos 54 | Strela-1 | 21 February 1965; 11:00 | Kosmos-1 65S3 | Communication | 15 September 1968 | |
| Kosmos 55 | Strela-1 | 21 February 1965; 11:00 | Kosmos-1 65S3 | Communication | 2 February 1968 | |
| Kosmos 56 | Strela-1 | 21 February 1965; 11:00 | Kosmos-1 65S3 | Communication | 2 November 1967 | |
| Kosmos 57 | Voskhod 3KD | 22 February 1965; 07:40 | Voskhod 11A57 | Test | 22 February 1967* | Prototype Voskhod spacecraft, accidentally commanded to self-destruct |
| Kosmos 58 | Meteor | 26 February 1965; 05:02 | Vostok-2M 8A92M | Weather | 25 February 1990 | |
| Kosmos 59 | Zenit-4 | 7 March 1965; 09:07 | Voskhod 11A57 | Reconnaissance | 15 March 1965 | Carried prototype Voskhod airlock |
| Kosmos 60 | E-6 | 12 March 1965; 09:30 | Molniya-L 8K72L | Lunar probe | 17 March 1965 | Launch failure |
| Kosmos 61 | Strela-1 | 15 March 1965; 11:00 | Kosmos-1 65S1 | Communication | 15 January 1968 | |
| Kosmos 62 | Strela-1 | 15 March 1965; 11:00 | Kosmos-1 65S1 | Communication | 24 September 1968 | |
| Kosmos 63 | Strela-1 | 15 March 1965; 11:00 | Kosmos-1 65S1 | Communication | 4 November 1967 | |
| Kosmos 64 | Zenit-2 | 25 March 1965; 10:04 | Vostok-2 8A92 | Reconnaissance | 2 April 1965 | |
| Kosmos 65 | Zenit-4 | 17 April 1965; 09:50 | Voskhod 11A57 | Reconnaissance | 25 April 1965 | |
| Kosmos 66 | Zenit-2 | 7 May 1965; 09:50 | Vostok-2 8A92 | Reconnaissance | 15 May 1965 | |
| Kosmos 67 | Zenit-4 | 25 May 1965; 10:48 | Voskhod 11A57 | Reconnaissance | 2 June 1965 | |
| Kosmos 68 | Zenit-2 | 15 June 1965; 10:04 | Vostok-2 8A92 | Reconnaissance | 23 June 1965 | |
| Kosmos 69 | Zenit-4 | 25 June 1965; 09:50 | Voskhod 11A57 | Reconnaissance | 3 July 1965 | |
| Kosmos 70 | DS-A1 | 2 July 1965; 06:30 | Kosmos 63S1 | Technology | 18 December 1966 | DS-A1 #7, last of seven DS-A1 satellites |
| Kosmos 71 | Strela-1 | 16 July 1965; 03:31 | Kosmos-1 65S3 | Communication | 11 August 1970 | |
| Kosmos 72 | Strela-1 | 16 July 1965; 03:31 | Kosmos-1 65S3 | Communication | 24 August 1979 | |
| Kosmos 73 | Strela-1 | 16 July 1965; 03:31 | Kosmos-1 65S3 | Communication | 20 March 1974 | |
| Kosmos 74 | Strela-1 | 16 July 1965; 03:31 | Kosmos-1 65S3 | Communication | 13 December 1979 | |
| Kosmos 75 | Strela-1 | 16 July 1965; 03:31 | Kosmos-1 65S3 | Communication | 28 September 1979 | |
| Kosmos 76 | DS-P1-Yu | 23 July 1965; 04:33 | Kosmos 63S1 | Radar target | 16 March 1966 | DS-P1-Yu #3, third of seventy nine DS-P1-Yu satellites |
| Kosmos 77 | Zenit-4 | 3 August 1965; 11:02 | Voskhod 11A57 | Reconnaissance | 11 August 1965 | |
| Kosmos 78 | Zenit-2 | 14 August 1965; 11:16 | Vostok-2 8A92 | Reconnaissance | 22 August 1965 | |
| Kosmos 79 | Zenit-4 | 25 August 1965; 10:02 | Voskhod 11A57 | Reconnaissance | 2 September 1965 | |
| Kosmos 80 | Strela-1 | 3 September 1965; 14:00 | Kosmos-1 65S3 | Communication | in orbit | |
| Kosmos 81 | Strela-1 | 3 September 1965; 14:00 | Kosmos-1 65S3 | Communication | in orbit | |
| Kosmos 82 | Strela-1 | 3 September 1965; 14:00 | Kosmos-1 65S3 | Communication | in orbit | |
| Kosmos 83 | Strela-1 | 3 September 1965; 14:00 | Kosmos-1 65S3 | Communication | in orbit | |
| Kosmos 84 | Strela-1 | 3 September 1965; 14:00 | Kosmos-1 65S3 | Communication | in orbit | |
| Kosmos 85 | Zenit-4 | 9 September 1965; 09:36 | Voskhod 11A57 | Reconnaissance | 17 September 1965 | |
| Kosmos 86 | Strela-1 | 18 September 1965; 07:59 | Kosmos-1 65S3 | Communication | in orbit | |
| Kosmos 87 | Strela-1 | 18 September 1965; 07:59 | Kosmos-1 65S3 | Communication | in orbit | |
| Kosmos 88 | Strela-1 | 18 September 1965; 07:59 | Kosmos-1 65S3 | Communication | in orbit | |
| Kosmos 89 | Strela-1 | 18 September 1965; 07:59 | Kosmos-1 65S3 | Communication | in orbit | |
| Kosmos 90 | Strela-1 | 18 September 1965; 07:59 | Kosmos-1 65S3 | Communication | in orbit | |
| Kosmos 91 | Zenit-4 | 23 September 1965; 09:07 | Voskhod 11A57 | Reconnaissance | 1 October 1965 | |
| Kosmos 92 | Zenit-4 | 16 October 1965; 08:09 | Voskhod 11A57 | Reconnaissance | 24 October 1965 | |
| Kosmos 93 | DS-U2-V | 19 October 1965; 05:44 | Kosmos-2M 63S1M | Technology | 3 January 1966 | DS-U2-V #1, first of four DS-U2-V satellites |
| Kosmos 94 | Zenit-4 | 28 October 1965; 08:24 | Voskhod 11A57 | Reconnaissance | 5 November 1965 | |
| Kosmos 95 | DS-U2-V | 4 November 1965; 05:31 | Kosmos-2M 63S1M | Technology | 18 January 1966 | DS-U2-V #2, second of four DS-U2-V satellites |
| Kosmos 96 | 3MV-4 | 23 November 1965; 03:21 | Molniya-M 8K78M | Venus probe | 9 December 1965 | Remained in Earth orbit due to launch failure |
| Kosmos 97 | DS-U2-M | 26 November 1965; 12:14 | Kosmos-2M 63S1M | Measuring masers. Control and communication with other satellites. Theory of Relativity studies. | 2 April 1967 | DS-U2-M #1, first of two DS-U2-M satellites |
| Kosmos 98 | Zenit-2 | 27 November 1965; 08:24 | Vostok-2 8A92 | Reconnaissance | 5 December 1965 | |
| Kosmos 99 | Zenit-2 | 10 December 1965; 08:09 | Vostok-2 8A92 | Reconnaissance | 18 December 1965 | |
| Kosmos 100 | Meteor | 17 December 1965; 02:24 | Vostok-2M 8A92M | Weather | 15 February 2002 | |
| Kosmos 101 | DS-P1-Yu | 21 December 1965; 06:14 | Kosmos 63S1 | Radar target | 12 July 1966 | DS-P1-Yu #4, fourth of seventy nine DS-P1-Yu satellites |
| Kosmos 102 | US-A | 27 December 1965; 22:19 | Soyuz/Vostok 11A510 | ELINT | 13 January 1966 | Prototype |
| Kosmos 103 | Strela-2 | 28 December 1965; 12:30 | Kosmos-1 65S3 | Communication | 2 January 1990 | |
| Kosmos 104 | Zenit-2 | 7 January 1966; 08:24 | Vostok-2 8A92 | Reconnaissance | 15 January 1966 | |
| Kosmos 105 | Zenit-2 | 22 January 1966; 08:38 | Vostok-2 8A92 | Reconnaissance | 30 January 1966 | |
| Kosmos 106 | DS-P1-I | 25 January 1966; 12:28 | Kosmos-2M 63S1M | Radar target | 14 November 1966 | DS-P1-I #1, first of nineteen DS-P1-I satellites |
| Kosmos 107 | Zenit-2 | 10 February 1966; 08:52 | Vostok-2 8A92 | Reconnaissance | 18 February 1966 | |
| Kosmos 108 | DS-U1-G | 11 February 1966; 18:00 | Kosmos 63S1 | Solar | 21 November 1966 | DS-U1-G #1, first of two DS-U1-G satellites |
| Kosmos 109 | Zenit-4 | 19 February 1966; 08:52 | Voskhod 11A57 | Reconnaissance | 27 February 1966 | |
| Kosmos 110 | Voskhod 3KV | 22 February 1966; 20:09 | Voskhod 11A57 | Biological | 16 March 1966 | |
| Kosmos 111 | E-6S | 1 March 1966; 11:03 | Molniya-M 8K78M | Lunar probe | 3 March 1966 | Launch failure |
| Kosmos 112 | Zenit-2 | 17 March 1966; 10:28 | Vostok-2 8A92 | Reconnaissance | 25 March 1966 | |
| Kosmos 113 | Zenit-4 | 21 March 1966; 09:36 | Voskhod 11A57 | Reconnaissance | 29 March 1966 | |
| Kosmos 114 | Zenit-4 | 6 April 1966; 11:40 | Voskhod 11A57 | Reconnaissance | 14 April 1966 | |
| Kosmos 115 | Zenit-2 | 20 April 1966; 10:48 | Vostok-2 8A92 | Reconnaissance | 28 April 1966 | |
| Kosmos 116 | DS-P1-Yu | 26 April 1966; 10:04 | Kosmos-2M 63S1M | Radar target | 3 December 1966 | DS-P1-Yu #6, fifth of seventy nine DS-P1-Yu satellites |
| Kosmos 117 | Zenit-2 | 6 May 1966; 11:02 | Vostok-2 8A92 | Reconnaissance | 14 May 1966 | |
| Kosmos 118 | Meteor | 11 May 1966; 14:09 | Vostok-2M 8A92M | Weather | 23 November 1988 | |
| Kosmos 119 | DS-U2-I | 24 May 1966; 05:31 | Kosmos-2I 63SM | Ionospheric | 30 November 1966 | DS-U2-I #1, first of three DS-U2-I satellites |
| Kosmos 120 | Zenit-2 | 8 June 1966; 11:02 | Voskhod 11A57 | Reconnaissance | 16 June 1966 | |
| Kosmos 121 | Zenit-4 | 17 June 1966; 11:00 | Voskhod 11A57 | Reconnaissance | 25 June 1966 | |
| Kosmos 122 | Meteor | 25 June 1966; 10:19 | Vostok-2M 8A92M | Weather | In orbit | The launch was witnessed by President Charles de Gaulle. |
| Kosmos 123 | DS-P1-Yu | 8 July 1966; 05:31 | Kosmos 63S1 | Radar target | 10 December 1966 | DS-P1-Yu #5, sixth of seventy nine DS-P1-Yu satellites |
| Kosmos 124 | Zenit-2 | 14 July 1966; 10:33 | Voskhod 11A57 | Reconnaissance | 22 July 1966 | |
| Kosmos 125 | US-A | 20 July 1966; 09:07 | Soyuz/Vostok 11A510 | ELINT | 2 August 1966 | Prototype |
| Kosmos 126 | Zenit-4 | 28 July 1966; 10:48 | Voskhod 11A57 | Reconnaissance | 6 August 1966 | |
| Kosmos 127 | Zenit-4 | 8 August 1966; 11:16 | Voskhod 11A57 | Reconnaissance | 16 August 1966 | |
| Kosmos 128 | Zenit-4 | 27 August 1966; 09:50 | Voskhod 11A57 | Reconnaissance | 4 September 1966 | |
| Kosmos 129 | Zenit-2 | 14 October 1966; 12:13 | Vostok-2 8A92 | Reconnaissance | 21 October 1966 | |
| Kosmos 130 | Zenit-4 | 20 October 1966; 08:52 | Voskhod 11A57 | Reconnaissance | 28 October 1966 | |
| Kosmos 131 | Zenit-4 | 12 November 1966; 09:50 | Voskhod 11A57 | Reconnaissance | 20 November 1966 | |
| Kosmos 132 | Zenit-2 | 19 November 1966; 08:09 | Vostok-2 8A92 | Reconnaissance | 27 November 1966 | |
| Kosmos 133 | Soyuz 7K-OK | 28 November 1966; 11:00 | Soyuz 11A511 | Test | 30 November 1966 | Prototype Soyuz, attitude control system failed, self-destructed during reentry |
| Kosmos 134 | Zenit-4 | 3 December 1966; 08:09 | Voskhod 11A57 | Reconnaissance | 11 December 1966 | |
| Kosmos 135 | DS-U2-MP | 12 December 1966; 20:38 | Kosmos-2I 63SM | Micrometeoroids | 12 April 1967 | DS-U2-MP #1, first of two DS-U2-MP satellites |
| Kosmos 136 | Zenit-2 | 19 December 1966; 12:00 | Vostok-2 8A92 | Reconnaissance | 27 December 1966 | |
| Kosmos 137 | DS-U2-D | 21 December 1966; 13:12 | Kosmos 63S1 | Magnetospheric | 23 November 1967 | DS-U2-D #1, first of two DS-U2-D satellites |
| Kosmos 138 | Zenit-2 | 19 January 1967; 12:39 | Vostok-2 8A92 | Reconnaissance | 27 January 1967 | |
| Kosmos 139 | OGCh | 25 January 1967; 13:55 | R-36O 8K69 | FOBS | 25 January 1967 | Successful test, hit Kapustin Yar |
| Kosmos 140 | Soyuz 7K-OK | 7 February 1967; 03:20 | Soyuz 11A511 | Test | 9 February 1967 | Prototype Soyuz |
| Kosmos 141 | Zenit-4 | 8 February 1967; 10:19 | Voskhod 11A57 | Reconnaissance | 16 February 1967 | |
| Kosmos 142 | DS-U2-I | 14 February 1967; 10:04 | Kosmos-2I 63SM | Ionospheric | 6 July 1967 | DS-U2-I #2, second of three DS-U2-I satellites |
| Kosmos 143 | Zenit-2 | 27 February 1967; 08:45 | Vostok-2 8A92 | Reconnaissance | 7 March 1967 | |
| Kosmos 144 | Meteor | 28 February 1967; 14:34:59 | Vostok-2M 8A92M | Weather | 14 September 1982 | Onboard TV and infrared photography technology provided coverage of about 8% of the surface of the Earth - Kosmos 144 produced pictures of cloud and of snow and ice fields. Data on radiation streams reflected and emitted by the Earth and the Earth's atmosphere over about 20% of the Earths surface were provided on each orbit. |
| Kosmos 145 | DS-U2-M | 3 March 1967; 06:44:58 | Kosmos-2I 63SM | Technology | 8 March 1968 | DS-U2-M #2, second and last DS-U2-M satellite |
| Kosmos 146 | Soyuz 7K-L1P | 10 March 1967; 11:30 | Proton-K/D 8K72K | Test | 22 March 1967 | Prototype Lunar Soyuz, recovery not attempted |
| Kosmos 147 | Zenit-2 | 13 March 1967; 12:10 | Vostok-2 8A92 | Reconnaissance | 21 March 1967 | |
| Kosmos 148 | DS-P1-I | 16 March 1967; 17:30 | Kosmos-2I 63SM | Radar target | 7 May 1967 | DS-P1-I #2, second of nineteen DS-P1-I satellites |
| Kosmos 149 | DS-MO | 21 March 1967; 10:07 | Kosmos-2I 63SM | Technology | 7 April 1967 | DS-MO #1, first of two DS-MO satellites |
| Kosmos 150 | Zenit-4 | 22 March 1967; 12:44 | Voskhod 11A57 | Reconnaissance | 30 March 1967 | |
| Kosmos 151 | Strela-2 | 24 March 1967; 11:50 | Kosmos-3 11K65 | Communication | 6 May 1991 | |
| Kosmos 152 | DS-P1-Yu | 25 March 1967; 06:59 | Kosmos-2I 63SM | Radar target | 5 August 1967 | DS-P1-Yu #7, seventh of seventy nine DS-P1-Yu satellites |
| Kosmos 153 | Zenit-2 | 4 April 1967; 14:00 | Vostok-2 8A92 | Reconnaissance | 12 April 1967 | |
| Kosmos 154 | Soyuz 7K-L1P | 8 April 1967; 09:07 | Proton-K/D 8K72K | Test | 10 April 1967 | Prototype Lunar Soyuz |
| Kosmos 155 | Zenit-4 | 12 April 1967; 10:51 | Voskhod 11A57 | Reconnaissance | 12 April 1967 | |
| Kosmos 156 | Meteor | 27 April 1967; 12:50 | Vostok-2M 8A92M | Weather | 23 October 1989 | Onboard TV and infrared photography technology provided coverage of about 8% of the surface of the Earth - Kosmos 156 produced pictures of cloud and of snow and ice fields. Data on radiation streams reflected and emitted by the Earth and the Earth's atmosphere over about 20% of the Earths surface were provided on each orbit. |
| Kosmos 157 | Zenit-2 | 12 May 1967; 10:30 | Vostok-2 8A92 | Reconnaissance | 20 May 1967 | |
| Kosmos 158 | Tsiklon-GVM | 15 May 1967; 11:00 | Kosmos-3M 11K65M | Navigation | in orbit | |
| Kosmos 159 | E-6LS | 16 May 1967; 21:43:57 | Molniya-M 8K78M | Uncrewed lunar spacecraft | 11 November 1967 | |
| Kosmos 160 | OGCh | 17 May 1967; 16:05 | R-36O 8K69 | FOBS | 17 May 1967 | |
| Kosmos 161 | Zenit-4 | 22 May 1967; 14:00 | Voskhod 11A57 | Reconnaissance | 30 May 1967 | |
| Kosmos 162 | Zenit-4 | 1 June 1967; 10:40 | Voskhod 11A57 | Reconnaissance | 9 June 1967 | |
| Kosmos 163 | DS-U2-MP | 5 June 1967; 05:03 | Kosmos-2I 63SM | Micrometeoroids | 11 October 1967 | DS-U2-MP #2, second and last DS-U2-MP |
| Kosmos 164 | Zenit-2 | 8 June 1967; 13:00 | Voskhod 11A57 | Reconnaissance | 14 June 1967 | |
| Kosmos 165 | DS-P1-Yu | 12 June 1967; 18:06 | Kosmos-2I 63SM | Radar target | 15 January 1968 | DS-P1-Yu #11, eighth of seventy nine DS-P1-Yu satellites |
| Kosmos 166 | DS-U3-S | 16 June 1967; 04:44 | Kosmos-2I 63SM | Solar | 25 October 1967 | DS-U3-S #1, first of two DS-U3-S satellites |
| Kosmos 167 | 4V-1 | 17 June 1967; 02:36 | Molniya-M 8K78M | Venus probe | 25 June 1967 | Remained in Earth orbit after upper stage malfunction |
| Kosmos 168 | Zenit-2 | 4 July 1967; 05:59 | Voskhod 11A57 | Reconnaissance | 12 July 1967 | |
| Kosmos 169 | OGCh | 17 July 1967; 16:45 | R-36O 8K69 | FOBS | 17 July 1967 | |
| Kosmos 170 | OGCh | 31 July 1967; 16:45 | R-36O 8K69 | FOBS | 31 July 1967 | Explained as test of new parachute system for Soyuz |
| Kosmos 171 | OGCh | 8 August 1967; 16:05 | R-36O 8K69 | FOBS | 8 August 1967 | Explained as test of new parachute system for Soyuz |
| Kosmos 172 | Zenit-4 | 9 August 1967; 05:45 | Voskhod 11A57 | Reconnaissance | 17 August 1967 | |
| Kosmos 173 | DS-P1-Yu | 24 August 1967; 04:59 | Kosmos-2I 63SM | Radar target | 17 December 1967 | DS-P1-Yu #8, ninth of seventy nine DS-P1-Yu satellites |
| Kosmos 174 | Molniya-1Yu | 31 August 1967; 08:00 | Molniya-M 8K78M | Communication | 30 December 1968 | Spacecraft failed |
| Kosmos 175 | Zenit-4 | 11 September 1967; 10:30 | Voskhod 11A57 | Reconnaissance | 19 September 1967 | |
| Kosmos 176 | DS-P1-Yu | 12 September 1967; 17:00 | Kosmos-2I 63SM | Radar target | 3 March 1968 | DS-P1-Yu #10, tenth of seventy nine DS-P1-Yu satellites |
| Kosmos 177 | Zenit-2 | 16 September 1967; 06:06 | Voskhod 11A57 | Reconnaissance | 24 September 1967 | |
| Kosmos 178 | OGCh | 19 September 1967; 14:45 | R-36O 8K69 | FOBS | 19 September 1967 | |
| Kosmos 179 | OGCh | 22 September 1967; 14:05 | R-36O 8K69 | FOBS | 22 September 1967 | |
| Kosmos 180 | Zenit-2 | 26 September 1967; 10:20 | Voskhod 11A57 | Reconnaissance | 4 October 1967 | |
| Kosmos 181 | Zenit-2 | 11 October 1967; 11:30 | Voskhod 11A57 | Reconnaissance | 19 October 1967 | |
| Kosmos 182 | Zenit-4 | 16 October 1967; 08:00 | Voskhod 11A57 | Reconnaissance | 24 October 1967 | |
| Kosmos 183 | OGCh | 18 October 1967; 13:30 | R-36O 8K69 | FOBS | 18 October 1967 | |
| Kosmos 184 | Meteor | 24 October 1967; 22:49 | Vostok-2M 8A92M | Weather | 2 April 1989 | Orbit 628 km circular. Inclination 81 degrees. Kosmos 184 was 20 minutes ahead of Meteor satellite Kosmos 206 on the same circular orbit. Kosmos 206 was able to check data from Kosmos 184. |
| Kosmos 185 | IS-A | 27 October 1967; 02:21 | Tsyklon-2A 11K67 | ASAT test | 14 January 1969 | |
| Kosmos 186 | Soyuz 7K-OK | 27 October 1967; 09:29 | Soyuz 11A511 | Test | 31 October 1967 | Carried out the world's first ever automatic docking, and the Soviet Union's first ever docking of any kind. Prototype Soyuz, docked with Kosmos 188 |
| Kosmos 187 | OGCh | 28 October 1967; 13:15 | R-36O 8K69 | FOBS | 28 October 1967 | |
| Kosmos 188 | Soyuz 7K-OK | 30 October 1967; 08:12 | Soyuz 11A511 | Test | 2 November 1967 | Was the passive docking target for active craft Kosmos 186. The two Kosmos crafts carried out the world's first ever automatic docking. The docking was the Soviet Union's first ever docking of any kind. Prototype Soyuz, docked with Kosmos 186 |
| Kosmos 189 | Tselina-O GVM | 30 October 1967; 17:59 | Kosmos-3M 11K65M | ELINT | 8 June 1978 | |
| Kosmos 190 | Zenit-4 | 3 November 1967; 11:20 | Voskhod 11A57 | Reconnaissance | 11 November 1967 | |
| Kosmos 191 | DS-P1-Yu | 21 November 1967; 14:29 | Kosmos-2I 63SM | Radar target | 2 March 1968 | DS-P1-Yu #9, eleventh of seventy nine DS-P1-Yu satellites |
| Kosmos 192 | Tsiklon | 23 November 1967; 15:00 | Kosmos-3M 11K65M | Navigation | in orbit | Orbit just below 800 km. Inclination 74 degrees. This was the first USSR Navsat Kosmos satellite. Spewed about 20 debris on its orbit in Aug. 30, 2009. This was possibly due to impact with unknown object or due to breach of pressurized compartment |
| Kosmos 193 | Zenit-2 | 25 November 1967; 11:30 | Voskhod 11A57 | Reconnaissance | 3 December 1967 | |
| Kosmos 194 | Zenit-4 | 3 December 1967; 12:00 | Voskhod 11A57 | Reconnaissance | 11 December 1967 | |
| Kosmos 195 | Zenit-2 | 16 December 1967; 12:00 | Voskhod 11A57 | Reconnaissance | 24 December 1967 | |
| Kosmos 196 | DS-U1-G | 19 December 1967; 06:30 | Kosmos 63S1 | Solar | 7 July 1968 | DS-U1-G #2, second of two DS-U1-G satellites |
| Kosmos 197 | DS-U2-V | 26 December 1967; 09:01 | Kosmos-2I 63SM | Technology | 30 January 1968 | DS-U2-V #3, third of four DS-U2-V satellites |
| Kosmos 198 | US-A | 27 December 1967; 11:28 | Tsyklon-2A 11K67 | Radar Ocean Surveillance. | in orbit | Baikonur launch. Orbit 249 x 270 km. Inclination 65 degrees. Weight-possibly 3,500 kg. First development flight of nuclear-powered radar ocean surveillance satellite. On 29 December 1967 the satellite was maneuvered to a storage orbit of 894 x 952 km. |
| Kosmos 199 | Zenit-2 | 16 January 1968; 12:00 | Voskhod 11A57 | Reconnaissance | 30 January 1968 | |
| Kosmos 200 | Tselina-O | 19 January 1968; 21:59 | Kosmos-3M 11K65M | ELINT | 24 February 1973 | |
| Kosmos 201 | Zenit-4 | 6 February 1968; 08:00 | Voskhod 11A57 | Reconnaissance | 14 February 1968 | |
| Kosmos 202 | DS-U2-V | 20 February 1968; 10:03 | Kosmos-2I 63SM | Technology | 24 March 1968 | DS-U2-V #4, fourth and last DS-U2-V satellite |
| Kosmos 203 | Sfera | 20 February 1968; 16:00 | Kosmos-3M 11K65M | Geodesy | in orbit | |
| Kosmos 204 | DS-P1-I | 5 March 1968; 11:20 | Kosmos-2I 63SM | Radar target | 2 March 1969 | DS-P1-I #1, third of nineteen DS-P1-I satellites |
| Kosmos 205 | Zenit-2 | 5 March 1968; 12:30 | Voskhod 11A57 | Reconnaissance | 13 March 1968 | |
| Kosmos 206 | Meteor | 14 March 1968; 09:34 | Vostok-2M 8A92M | Weather | 22 April 1989 | Orbit 628 km circular. Inclination 81 degrees. Kosmos 206 was 20 minutes behind meteor satellite Kosmos 184 and on the same orbit. Kosmos 206 was able to check the data of Kosmos 184. |
| Kosmos 207 | Zenit-4 | 16 March 1968; 12:30 | Voskhod 11A57 | Reconnaissance | 24 March 1968 | |
| Kosmos 208 | Zenit-2M | 21 March 1968; 09:50 | Voskhod 11A57 | Reconnaissance | 2 April 1968 | |
| Kosmos 209 | US-A | 22 March 1968; 09:30 | Tsyklon-2A 11K67 | Reconnaissance | in orbit | |
| Kosmos 210 | Zenit-2 | 3 April 1968; 11:00 | Voskhod 11A57 | Reconnaissance | 11 April 1968 | |
| Kosmos 211 | DS-P1-Yu | 9 April 1968; 11:26 | Kosmos-2I 63SM | Radar target | 10 November 1968 | DS-P1-Yu #13, twelfth of seventy nine DS-P1-Yu satellites |
| Kosmos 212 | Soyuz 7K-OK | 14 April 1968; 10:00 | Soyuz 11A51 | Test | 19 April 1968 | Prototype Soyuz, docked with Kosmos 213 |
| Kosmos 213 | Soyuz 7K-OK | 15 April 1968; 06:34 | Soyuz 11A51 | Test | 20 April 1968 | Prototype Soyuz, docked with Kosmos 212 |
| Kosmos 214 | Zenit-4 | 18 April 1968; 10:30 | Voskhod 11A57 | Reconnaissance | 26 April 1968 | |
| Kosmos 215 | DS-U1-A | 18 April 1968; 22:29 | Kosmos-2I 63SM | Solar/Astronomy | 30 June 1968 | DS-U1-A #1, only DS-U1-A satellite to be launched |
| Kosmos 216 | Zenit-2 | 20 April 1968; 10:30 | Voskhod 11A57 | Reconnaissance | 28 April 1968 | |
| Kosmos 217 | IS-P | 24 April 1968; 16:00 | Tsyklon-2A 11K67 | ASAT target | 26 April 1968 | Failed to separate from carrier rocket, interceptor not launched. |
| Kosmos 218 | OGCh | 25 April 1968; 00:43 | R-36O 8K69 | FOBS | 25 April 1968 | |
| Kosmos 219 | DS-U2-D | 26 April 1968; 04:42 | Kosmos-2I 63SM | Magnetospheric | 2 March 1969 | DS-U2-D #2, final DS-U2-D |
| Kosmos 220 | Tsiklon | 7 May 1968; 13:58 | Kosmos-3M 11K65M | Navigation | in orbit | |
| Kosmos 221 | DS-P1-Yu | 24 May 1968; 07:04 | Kosmos-2I 63SM | Radar target | 31 August 1969 | DS-P1-Yu #14, thirteenth of seventy nine DS-P1-Yu satellites |
| Kosmos 222 | DS-P1-Yu | 30 May 1968; 20:29 | Kosmos-2I 63SM | Radar target | 11 October 1968 | DS-P1-Yu #12, fourteenth of seventy nine DS-P1-Yu satellites |
| Kosmos 223 | Zenit-2 | 1 June 1968; 10:50 | Voskhod 11A57 | Reconnaissance | 9 June 1968 | |
| Kosmos 224 | Zenit-4 | 4 June 1968; 06:45 | Voskhod 11A57 | Reconnaissance | 12 June 1968 | |
| Kosmos 225 | DS-U1-Ya | 11 June 1968; 21:29 | Kosmos-2I 63SM | Mangetospheric | 2 November 1968 | DS-U1-Ya #1, second of two DS-U1-Ya satellites, but the only one to reach orbit |
| Kosmos 226 | Meteor | 12 June 1968; 13:14 | Vostok-2M 8A92M | Weather | 18 October 1983 | |
| Kosmos 227 | Zenit-4 | 18 June 1968; 06:15 | Voskhod 11A57 | Reconnaissance | 26 June 1968 | |
| Kosmos 228 | Zenit-2M | 21 June 1968; 12:00 | Voskhod 11A57 | Reconnaissance | 3 July 1968 | |
| Kosmos 229 | Zenit-4 | 26 June 1968; 11:00 | Voskhod 11A57 | Reconnaissance | 4 July 1968 | |
| Kosmos 230 | DS-U3-S | 5 July 1968; 06:59 | Kosmos-2I 63SM | Solar | 2 November 1968 | DS-U3-S #2, second of two DS-U3-S satellites |
| Kosmos 231 | Zenit-2 | 10 July 1968; 19:49 | Voskhod 11A57 | Reconnaissance | 18 July 1968 | |
| Kosmos 232 | Zenit-4 | 16 July 1968; 13:10 | Voskhod 11A57 | Reconnaissance | 24 July 1968 | |
| Kosmos 233 | DS-P1-Yu | 18 July 1968; 19:59 | Kosmos-2I 63SM | Radar target | 7 February 1969 | DS-P1-Yu #15, fifteenth of seventy nine DS-P1-Yu satellites |
| Kosmos 234 | Zenit-4 | 30 July 1968; 07:00 | Voskhod 11A57 | Reconnaissance | 5 August 1968 | |
| Kosmos 235 | Zenit-2 | 9 August 1968; 07:00 | Voskhod 11A57 | Reconnaissance | 17 August 1968 | |
| Kosmos 236 | Strela-2 | 27 August 1968; 11:29 | Kosmos-3 11K65 | Communication | 4 March 1990 | |
| Kosmos 237 | Zenit-4 | 27 August 1968; 12:29 | Voskhod 11A57 | Reconnaissance | 4 September 1968 | |
| Kosmos 238 | Soyuz 7K-OK | 28 August 1968; 10:00 | Soyuz 11A51 | Test | 1 September 1968 | Prototype Soyuz, final test before resumption of crewed flights |
| Kosmos 239 | Zenit-4 | 5 September 1968; 07:00 | Voskhod 11A57 | Reconnaissance | 13 September 1968 | |
| Kosmos 240 | Zenit-2 | 14 September 1968; 06:50 | Voskhod 11A57 | Reconnaissance | 21 September 1968 | |
| Kosmos 241 | Zenit-4 | 16 September 1968; 12:30 | Voskhod 11A57 | Reconnaissance | 24 September 1968 | |
| Kosmos 242 | DS-P1-I | 20 September 1968; 14:39 | Kosmos-2I 63SM | Radar target | 13 November 1968 | DS-P1-I #4, fourth of nineteen DS-P1-I satellites |
| Kosmos 243 | Zenit-2M | 23 September 1968; 07:39 | Voskhod 11A57 | Studied heat emission from the Earth and the Earth's atmosphere. | 4 October 1968 | Baikonur launch. Orbit 209 x 319 km. Inclination 71 degrees. Weight 6 tonnes. The first satellite to study heat emission from Earth and its atmosphere. An Antarctic ice map was able to be made. Moisture content of the atmosphere was able to be recorded. Central points of intensive precipitation hidden by dense clouds were able to be discovered. Water surface temperatures for large parts of the Pacific Ocean were able to be mapped in less than the time of one orbit. Kosmos 243 was probably recovered after 11 days. |
| Kosmos 244 | OGCh | 2 October 1968; 13:35 | R-36O 8K69 | FOBS | 2 October 1968 | red |
| Kosmos 245 | DS-P1-Yu | 3 October 1968; 12:58 | Kosmos-2I 63SM | Radar target | 15 January 1969 | DS-P1-Yu #16, sixteenth of seventy nine DS-P1-Yu satellites |
| Kosmos 246 | Zenit-4 | 7 October 1968; 12:05 | Voskhod 11A57 | Reconnaissance | 12 October 1968 | |
| Kosmos 247 | Zenit-2 | 11 October 1968; 12:05 | Voskhod 11A57 | Reconnaissance | 19 October 1968 | |
| Kosmos 248 | IS-P | 19 October 1968; 04:20 | Tsyklon-2A 11K67 | ASAT target | 1 November 1968* | Intercepted by Kosmos 249 during non-destructive tests before being destroyed by Kosmos 252 |
| Kosmos 249 | IS-A | 20 October 1968; 04:02 | Tsyklon-2A 11K67 | ASAT | 20 October 1968* | Intercepted Kosmos 248 during non-destructive test, subsequently self-destructed |
| Kosmos 250 | Tselina-O | 19 January 1968; 22:00 | Kosmos-3M 11K65M | ELINT | 15 February 1978 | |

* — satellite was destroyed in orbit rather than decaying and burning up in the Earth's atmosphere

== See also ==
- List of USA satellites
