= 1968 in spaceflight =

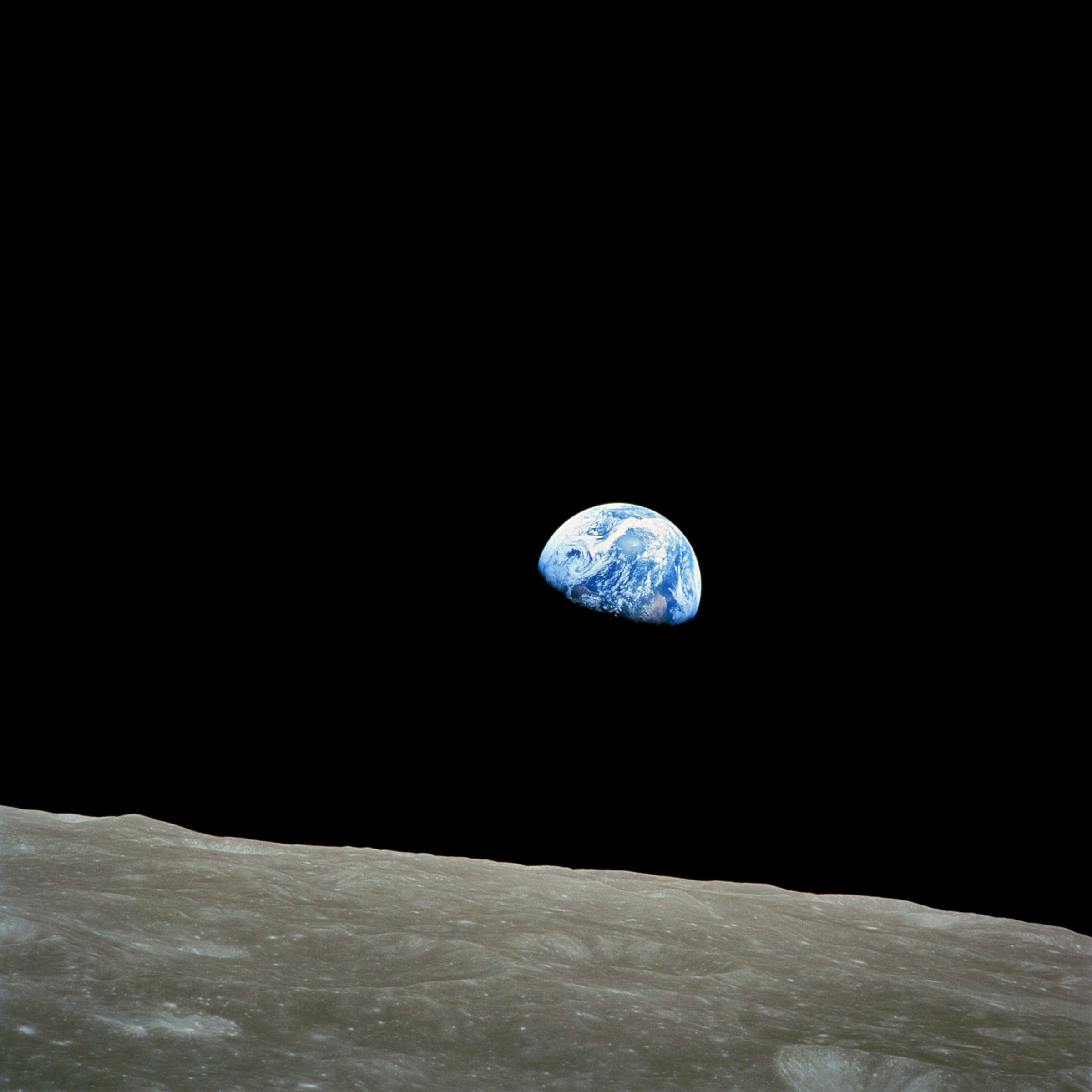
- The crew of Apollo 8 were the first humans to witness Earthrise, photographed by William Anders on 24 December 1968

Orbital launches
- First: 7 January
- Last: 26 December
- Total: 128
- Successes: 119
- Failures: 9
- Partial failures: 3

Rockets
- Maiden flights: Delta M Delta N
- Retirements: Delta J Kosmos-3

Crewed flights
- Orbital: 3

1968 in spaceflight

The United States National Space Science Data Center catalogued 157 spacecraft placed into orbit by launches, which occurred in 1968. It was the year in which Earth lifeforms first left low Earth orbit, during the successful Soviet Zond 5 mission around the Moon and the Zond 6 lunar mission which crashed upon return. It was also the year that humans first left low Earth orbit, during the successful Apollo 8 mission to the Moon.

== Deep space lunar missions ==
Date (UTC)	Spacecraft	Event	Remarks
10 January	Surveyor 7	Lunar landing	in the debris from Tycho crater
31 January	Lunar Orbiter 5	Lunar impact	
10 April	Luna 14	Lunar orbit insertion	
18 September	Zond 5	Lunar flyby; first return to Earth after deep-space flight; first Earth life forms to travel around the Moon (two Russian tortoises)	Closest approach: 1,950 kilometres (1,210 mi)
14 November	Zond 6	Lunar flyby with turtles, flies, and bacteria	Closest approach: 2,420 kilometres (1,500 mi)
24 December	Apollo 8	Lunar orbit insertion; first humans to orbit the Moon	
25 December	Apollo 8	Leaves lunar orbit	Completed 10 orbits

== Orbital launches ==
- ← Jan
- Feb
- Mar
- Apr
- May
- Jun
- Jul
- Aug
- Sep
- Oct
- Nov
- Dec →

Key

USA
USSR

=== January ===
January launches
Date and time (UTC)	Rocket	Flight number	Launch site		LSP	
Date and time (UTC)	Payload	Operator	Orbit	Function	Decay (UTC)	Outcome
Date and time (UTC)	Remarks					
7 January; 06:30	(United States) Atlas-SLV3 Centaur-D	AC-15	(United States) Cape Canaveral SLC-36A			
7 January; 06:30	(United States) Surveyor 7	NASA	Selenocentric	Lunar lander	10 January (on Moon)	Successful
11 January; 16:16	(United States) Delta E1	D-56	(United States) Vandenberg SLC-2E			
11 January; 16:16	(United States) Explorer 36 (GEOS-B)	NASA	Low Earth	Research	In orbit	Successful
16 January; 12:00	(Soviet Union) Voskhod		(Soviet Union) Plesetsk Site 41/1			
16 January; 12:00	(Soviet Union) Kosmos 199 (Zenit-2 #58)	GRU	Low Earth Orbit	Reconnaissance	In orbit	Successful
17 January; 10:12	(United States) Thor SLV-2A Agena-D		(United States) Vandenberg SLC-2W			
17 January; 10:12	(United States) OPS 1965 Multigroup 3&Setter 1B-2	USAF	Low Earth	ELINT	In orbit	Successful
18 January; 19:04	(United States) Titan IIIB Agena-D		(United States) Vandenberg SLC-4W			
18 January; 19:04	(United States) OPS 5028 KH-8 4311	USAF	Low Earth	Reconnaissance	In orbit	Successful
19 January; 22:00	(Soviet Union) Kosmos-3M		(Soviet Union) Plesetsk Site 132/2			
19 January; 22:00	(Soviet Union) Kosmos 200 (Tselina O #2)		Low Earth Orbit	SIGINT	In orbit	Successful
22 January; 22:48:09	(United States) Saturn IB (C-1B)		(United States) Cape Canaveral LC-37B		(United States) NASA	
22 January; 22:48:09	Apollo 5	NASA	LEO	Test Lunar Module	12 February 1968; 09:59	Successful
22 January; 22:48:09	Minor malfunction of LM descent stage engine, otherwise successful					
24 January; 22:26	(United States) Thorad-SLV2G Agena-D		(United States) Vandenberg SLC-1E			
24 January; 22:26	(United States) OPS 5028 KH-4A 1045	CIA	Low Earth	Reconnaissance	In orbit	Successful
24 January; 22:26	(United States) Tivoli 1	USAF	Low Earth	ELINT	In orbit	Successful

=== February ===
February launches
Date and time (UTC)	Rocket	Flight number	Launch site		LSP	
Date and time (UTC)	Payload	Operator	Orbit	Function	Decay (UTC)	Outcome
Date and time (UTC)	Remarks					
6 February; 08:00	(Soviet Union) Voskhod		(Soviet Union) Baikonur Site 31/6			
6 February; 08:00	(Soviet Union) Kosmos 201 (Zenit-4 #38)	GRU	Low Earth Orbit	Reconnaissance	In orbit	Successful
7 February; 10:43	(Soviet Union) Molniya-M / Blok L		(Soviet Union) Baikonur Site 1/5			
7 February; 10:43	(Soviet Union) (Ye-6LS No 112)		Selenocentric	Lunar Orbiter	7 February	Failure
20 February; 10:03	(Soviet Union) Kosmos-2		(Soviet Union) Kapustin Yar Site 86/1			
20 February; 10:03	(Soviet Union) Kosmos 202 (DS-U2-V #4)		Low Earth Orbit	Ionospheric research	24 March	Successful
20 February; 16:00	(Soviet Union) Kosmos-3M		(Soviet Union) Plesetsk Site 132/2			
20 February; 16:00	(Soviet Union) Kosmos 203 (Sfera #1)		Low Earth Orbit	Geodesy	In orbit	Successful

=== March ===
March launches
Date and time (UTC)	Rocket	Flight number	Launch site		LSP	
Date and time (UTC)	Payload	Operator	Orbit	Function	Decay (UTC)	Outcome
Date and time (UTC)	Remarks					
2 March; 03:55	(United States) Scout-A		(United States) Vandenberg SLC-5			
2 March; 03:55	(United States) OPS 7034 Transit-O 18	USN	Low Earth	Navigation	In orbit	Successful
2 March; 18:29	(Soviet Union) Proton K / Blok D		(Soviet Union) Baikonur Site 81/23		MOM	
2 March; 18:29	(Soviet Union) Zond 4 (L1 6)	MOM	Lunar free-return	Prototype Soyuz 7K-L1P/Zond	9 March	Successful
4 March; 13:06	(United States) Atlas-SLV3 Agena-D		(United States) Cape Canaveral LC-13			
4 March; 13:06	(United States) OGO 5 (EGO 3)	NASA	Low Earth	Research	In orbit	Successful
5 March; 11:20	(Soviet Union) Kosmos-2		(Soviet Union) Plesetsk Site 133/1			
5 March; 11:20	(Soviet Union) Kosmos 204 (DS-P1-I #3)		Low Earth Orbit	Radar calibration	2 March 1969	Successful
5 March; 12:30	(Soviet Union) Voskhod		(Soviet Union) Plesetsk Site 41/1			
5 March; 12:30	(Soviet Union) Kosmos 205 (Zenit-2 #59)	GRU	Low Earth Orbit	Reconnaissance	In orbit	Successful
5 March; 18:28	(United States) Scout-B		(United States) Wallops LA-3			
5 March; 18:28	(United States) Explorer 37 (Solrad 9)	NASA	Low Earth	Research	16 November 1990	Successful
6 March; 11:02	(Soviet Union) Kosmos-2		(Soviet Union) Kapustin Yar Site 86/1			
6 March; 11:02	(Soviet Union) (DS-U1-Ya #1)		Low Earth Orbit	Magnetosphere research	6 March	Failure
13 March; 19:51	(United States) Titan IIIB Agena-D		(United States) Vandenberg SLC-4W			
13 March; 19:51	(United States) OPS 5057 KH-8 4312	USAF	Low Earth	Reconnaissance	In orbit	Successful
14 March; 09:34	(Soviet Union) Vostok-2M		(Soviet Union) Plesetsk Site 41/1			
14 March; 09:34	(Soviet Union) Kosmos 206 (Meteor-1 #9)		Low Earth Orbit	Meteorology	22 April 1989	Successful
14 March; 22:00	(United States) Thorad-SLV2G Agena-D		(United States) Vandenberg SLC-1E			
14 March; 22:00	(United States) OPS 4849 KH-4A 1046	CIA	Low Earth	Reconnaissance	In orbit	Successful
14 March; 22:00	(United States) OPS 7076 Lampan 1 / Sampan 2	USAF	Low Earth	ELINT	In orbit	Successful
16 March; 12:30	(Soviet Union) Voskhod		(Soviet Union) Plesetsk Site 41/1			
16 March; 12:30	(Soviet Union) Kosmos 207 (Zenit-4 #39)	GRU	Low Earth Orbit	Reconnaissance	In orbit	Successful
21 March; 09:50	(Soviet Union) Voskhod		(Soviet Union) Baikonur Site 1/5			
21 March; 09:50	(Soviet Union) Kosmos 208 (Zenit-2M #1, Gektor #1) & Nauka-1KS 1L	GRU	Low Earth Orbit	Reconnaissance	In orbit	Successful
22 March; 09:30	(Soviet Union) Tsyklon-2A		(Soviet Union) Baikonur Site 90/19			
22 March; 09:30	(Soviet Union) Kosmos 209 (US-AO #4)		Low Earth Orbit	US-A prototype	In orbit	Successful

=== April ===
April launches
Date and time (UTC)	Rocket	Flight number	Launch site		LSP	
Date and time (UTC)	Payload	Operator	Orbit	Function	Decay (UTC)	Outcome
Date and time (UTC)	Remarks					
3 April; 11:00	(Soviet Union) Voskhod		(Soviet Union) Plesetsk Site 41/1			
3 April; 11:00	(Soviet Union) Kosmos 210 (Zenit-2 #60)	GRU	Low Earth Orbit	Reconnaissance	In orbit	Successful
4 April; 12:00:02	(United States) Saturn V (C-5)		(United States) LC-39A, Kennedy		(United States) NASA	
4 April; 12:00:02	(United States) Apollo 6	NASA	Low Earth (achieved); TLI to direct return abort (planned)	Test CSM heat shield at Lunar return speeds. Test S-IVB re-ignition in LEO.	4 April 1968; 21:57:26	Partial failure
4 April; 12:00:02	Experienced Pogo oscillation during S-IC first stage ascent. S-IVB failed restart test.					
6 April; 09:59	(United States) Atlas F OV1		(United States) Vandenberg LC-576A2			
6 April; 09:59	(United States) OV1 13	USAF	Low Earth	Radiation belt research	In orbit	Successful
6 April; 09:59	(United States) OV1 14	USAF	Low Earth	Radiation belt research	In orbit	Successful
7 April; 10:09	(Soviet Union) Molniya-M / Blok L		(Soviet Union) Baikonur Site 1/5			
7 April; 10:09	(Soviet Union) Luna 14		Selenocentric	Lunar Orbiter	In orbit	Successful
9 April; 11:26	(Soviet Union) Kosmos-2		(Soviet Union) Plesetsk Site 133/1			
9 April; 11:26	(Soviet Union) Kosmos 211 (DS-P1-Yu #12)		Low Earth Orbit	Radar calibration	In orbit	Successful
14 April; 10:00	(Soviet Union) Soyuz		(Soviet Union) Baikonur Site 31/6			
14 April; 10:00	(Soviet Union) Kosmos 212 (Soyuz Test #5)		Low Earth Orbit	Test spacecraft	In orbit	Successful
15 April; 09:34	(Soviet Union) Soyuz		(Soviet Union) Baikonur Site 1/5			
15 April; 09:34	(Soviet Union) Kosmos 213 (Soyuz Test #6)		Low Earth Orbit	Test spacecraft	In orbit	Successful
17 April; 17:00	(United States) Titan IIIB Agena-D		(United States) Vandenberg SLC-4W			
17 April; 17:00	(United States) OPS 5105 KH-8 4313	USAF	Low Earth	Reconnaissance	In orbit	Successful
18 April; 10:30	(Soviet Union) Voskhod		(Soviet Union) Plesetsk Site 41/1			
18 April; 10:30	(Soviet Union) Kosmos 214 (Zenit-4 #40)	GRU	Low Earth Orbit	Reconnaissance	In orbit	Successful
18 April; 22:29	(Soviet Union) Kosmos-2		(Soviet Union) Kapustin Yar Site 86/1			
18 April; 22:29	(Soviet Union) Kosmos 215 (DS-U1-A #1)		Low Earth Orbit	Aeronomy	30 June	Successful
20 April; 10:30	(Soviet Union) Voskhod		(Soviet Union) Baikonur Site 31/6			
20 April; 10:30	(Soviet Union) Kosmos 216 (Zenit-2 #61)	GRU	Low Earth Orbit	Reconnaissance	In orbit	Successful
21 April; 04:20	(Soviet Union) Molniya-M / Blok ML		(Soviet Union) Baikonur Site 1/5			
21 April; 04:20	(Soviet Union) Molniya-1 08		Molniya orbit	Communications	In orbit	Successful
22 April; 23:01	(Soviet Union) Proton K / Blok D		(Soviet Union) Pad 81/23, Baikonur		MOM	
22 April; 23:01	(Soviet Union) Zond (L1 7)	MOM	Lunar Free-return	Prototype Soyuz 7K-L1P/Zond	22 April	Failure
24 April; 16:00	(Soviet Union) Tsyklon-2A		(Soviet Union) Baikonur Site 90/19			
24 April; 16:00	(Soviet Union) Kosmos 217 (I2M #1)		Low Earth Orbit	ASAT target	26 April	Partial failure
24 April; 16:00	The satellite did not separate from the upper stage and was placed into lower than planned orbit					
25 April; 00:45	(Soviet Union) R-36-O		(Soviet Union) Baikonur Site 162/36			
25 April; 00:45	(Soviet Union) Kosmos 218 (OGCh #17)	RVSN	Low Earth Orbit	FOBS test	25 April	Successful
26 April; 04:42	(Soviet Union) Kosmos-2		(Soviet Union) Kapustin Yar Site 86/1			
26 April; 04:42	(Soviet Union) Kosmos 219 (DS-U2-D #2)		Low Earth Orbit	Magnetosphere research	2 March 1969	Successful

=== May ===
May launches
Date and time (UTC)	Rocket	Flight number	Launch site		LSP	
Date and time (UTC)	Payload	Operator	Orbit	Function	Decay (UTC)	Outcome
Date and time (UTC)	Remarks					
1 May; 21:31	(United States) Thorad-SLV2G Agena-D		(United States) Vandenberg SLC-3W			
1 May; 21:31	(United States) OPS 1413 KH-4B 1103		Low Earth	Reconnaissance	In orbit	Successful
7 May; 13:57	(Soviet Union) Kosmos 3M		(Soviet Union) Plesetsk Site 132/2			
7 May; 13:57	(Soviet Union) Kosmos 220 (Zaliv #2)		Low Earth Orbit	Navigation	In orbit	Successful
17 May; 02:06	(United States) Scout B		(United States) Vandenberg SLC-5			
17 May; 02:06	(European Union) ESRO 2B (Iris 2)	ESRO	Low Earth Orbit	Research	In orbit	Successful
18 May; 08:23	(United States) Thorad-SLV2G Agena-D		(United States) Vandenberg SLC-2E			
18 May; 08:23	(United States) Nimbus B	NASA/NOAA	Low Earth	Meteorology	18 May	Failure
18 May; 08:23	(United States) SECOR 10	US Army	Low Earth	Geodesy	18 May	Failure
23 May; 04:38	(United States) Thor LV-2F Burner 2		(United States) Vandenberg SLC-10W			
23 May; 04:38	(United States) OPS 7869 DMSP-4B F1	USAF	Low Earth	Meteorology	In orbit	Successful
24 May; 07:04	(Soviet Union) Kosmos-2		(Soviet Union) Kapustin Yar Site 86/1			
24 May; 07:04	(Soviet Union) Kosmos 221 (DS-P1-Yu #13)		Low Earth Orbit	Radar calibration	In orbit	Successful
30 May; 20:29	(Soviet Union) Kosmos-2		(Soviet Union) Plesetsk Site 133/1			
30 May; 20:29	(Soviet Union) Kosmos 222 (DS-P1-Yu #14)		Low Earth Orbit	Radar calibration	In orbit	Successful

=== June ===
June launches
Date and time (UTC)	Rocket	Flight number	Launch site		LSP	
Date and time (UTC)	Payload	Operator	Orbit	Function	Decay (UTC)	Outcome
Date and time (UTC)	Remarks					
1 June; 10:50	(Soviet Union) Voskhod		(Soviet Union) Plesetsk Site 41/1			
1 June; 10:50	(Soviet Union) Kosmos 223 (Zenit-2 #62)	GRU	Low Earth Orbit	Reconnaissance	In orbit	Successful
4 June; 06:45	(Soviet Union) Voskhod		(Soviet Union) Baikonur Site 31/6			
4 June; 06:45	(Soviet Union) Kosmos 224 (Zenit-4 #41)	GRU	Low Earth Orbit	Reconnaissance	In orbit	Successful
4 June; 18:45	(Soviet Union) Kosmos-3M		(Soviet Union) Plesetsk Site 132/2			
4 June; 18:45	(Soviet Union) Sfera #2		Low Earth Orbit	Geodesy	4 June	Failure
5 June; 17:33	(United States) Titan IIIB Agena-D		(United States) Vandenberg SLC-4W			
5 June; 17:33	(United States) OPS 5138 KH-8 4314	USAF	Low Earth	Reconnaissance	In orbit	Successful
11 June; 21:29	(Soviet Union) Kosmos-2		(Soviet Union) Kapustin Yar Site 86/1			
11 June; 21:29	(Soviet Union) Kosmos 225 (DS-U1-Ya #2)		Low Earth Orbit	Magnetosphere research	In orbit	Successful
12 June; 13:14	(Soviet Union) Vostok-2M		(Soviet Union) Plesetsk Site 41/1			
12 June; 13:14	(Soviet Union) Kosmos 226 (Meteor-1 #10)		Low Earth Orbit	Meteorology	In orbit	Successful
13 June; 14:03:00	(United States) Titan IIIC		(United States) Cape Canaveral Air Force Station LC-41		(United States) USAF	
13 June; 14:03:00	(United States) OPS 9341 IDCSP 20	USAF	Sub-GSO	Military communications	In orbit	Success
13 June; 14:03:00	(United States) OPS 9342 IDCSP 21	USAF	Sub-GSO	Military communications	In orbit	Success
13 June; 14:03:00	(United States) OPS 9343 IDCSP 22	USAF	Sub-GSO	Military communications	In orbit	Success
13 June; 14:03:00	(United States) OPS 9344 IDCSP 23	USAF	Sub-GSO	Military communications	In orbit	Success
13 June; 14:03:00	(United States) OPS 9345 IDCSP 24	USAF	Sub-GSO	Military communications	In orbit	Success
13 June; 14:03:00	(United States) OPS 9346 IDCSP 25	USAF	Sub-GSO	Military communications	In orbit	Success
13 June; 14:03:00	(United States) OPS 9347 IDCSP 26	USAF	Sub-GSO	Military communications	In orbit	Success
13 June; 14:03:00	(United States) OPS 9348 IDCSP 27	USAF	Sub-GSO	Military communications	In orbit	Success
15 June; 12:25	(Soviet Union) Kosmos-3		(Soviet Union) Plesetsk Site 41/15			
15 June; 12:25	(Soviet Union) (Strela-2 #4)		Low Earth Orbit	Military communications	15 June	Failure
18 June; 06:15	(Soviet Union) Voskhod		(Soviet Union) Baikonur Site 31/6			
18 June; 06:15	(Soviet Union) Kosmos 227 (Zenit-4 #42)	GRU	Low Earth Orbit	Reconnaissance	In orbit	Successful
20 June; 21:46	(United States) Thorad-SLV2G Agena-D		(United States) Vandenberg SLC-1E			
20 June; 21:46	(United States) OPS 5343 KH-4A 1047		Low Earth	Reconnaissance	In orbit	Successful
20 June; 21:46	(United States) OPS 5259 Tripos 3/Sousea 2	USAF	Low Earth	ELINT	In orbit	Successful
21 June; 12:00	(Soviet Union) Voskhod		(Soviet Union) Baikonur Site 31/6			
21 June; 12:00	(Soviet Union) Kosmos 228 (Zenit-2M #2, Gektor #2&Nauka-1KS 2L)	GRU	Low Earth Orbit	Reconnaissance	In orbit	Successful
26 June; 11:00	(Soviet Union) Voskhod		(Soviet Union) Plesetsk Site 41/1			
26 June; 11:00	(Soviet Union) Kosmos 229 (Zenit-4 #43)	GRU	Low Earth Orbit	Reconnaissance	In orbit	Successful

=== July ===
July launches
Date and time (UTC)	Rocket	Flight number	Launch site		LSP	
Date and time (UTC)	Payload	Operator	Orbit	Function	Decay (UTC)	Outcome
Date and time (UTC)	Remarks					
4 July; 17:26	(United States) Delta J	D-57	(United States) Vandenberg SLC-2E			
4 July; 17:26	(United States) Explorer 38 (RAE A)	NASA	Low Earth	Research	In orbit	Successful
5 July; 06:59	(Soviet Union) Kosmos-2		(Soviet Union) Kapustin Yar Site 86/1			
5 July; 06:59	(Soviet Union) Kosmos 230 (DS-U3-S #2)		Low Earth Orbit	Solar research	2 November	Successful
5 July; 15:25	(Soviet Union) Molniya-M / Blok ML		(Soviet Union) Baikonur Site 1/5			
5 July; 15:25	(Soviet Union) Molniya-1 09		Molniya	Communications	In orbit	Successful
10 July; 19:49	(Soviet Union) Voskhod		(Soviet Union) Baikonur Site 31/6			
10 July; 19:49	(Soviet Union) Kosmos 231 (Zenit-2 #63)	GRU	Low Earth Orbit	Reconnaissance	In orbit	Successful
11 July; 19:30	(United States) Atlas F OV1		(United States) Vandenberg LC576A2			
11 July; 19:30	(United States) OV1 15 (SPADES)	USAF	Low Earth	Technology Demonstration	In orbit	Successful
11 July; 19:30	(United States) OV1 16 (LOADS 1)	USAF	Low Earth	Technology Demonstration	In orbit	Successful
16 July; 13:10	(Soviet Union) Voskhod		(Soviet Union) Plesetsk Site 41/1			
16 July; 13:10	(Soviet Union) Kosmos 232 (Zenit-4 #44)	GRU	Low Earth Orbit	Reconnaissance	In orbit	Successful
18 July; 19:59	(Soviet Union) Kosmos-2		(Soviet Union) Plesetsk Site 133/1			
18 July; 19:59	(Soviet Union) Kosmos 233 (DS-P1-Yu #15)		Low Earth Orbit	Radar calibration	In orbit	Successful
30 July; 07:00	(Soviet Union) Voskhod		(Soviet Union) Baikonur Site 31/6			
30 July; 07:00	(Soviet Union) Kosmos 234 (Zenit-4 #45)	GRU	Low Earth Orbit	Reconnaissance	In orbit	Successful

=== August ===
August launches
Date and time (UTC)	Rocket	Flight number	Launch site		LSP	
Date and time (UTC)	Payload	Operator	Orbit	Function	Decay (UTC)	Outcome
Date and time (UTC)	Remarks					
6 August; 11:08	(United States) Atlas-SLV3 Agena-D		(United States) Cape Canaveral LC-13			
6 August; 11:08	(United States) OPS 2222 Canyon 1	USAF	Low Earth	SIGINT	In orbit	Successful
6 August; 16:30	(United States) Titan IIIB Agena-D		(United States) Vandenberg SLC-4W			
6 August; 16:30	(United States) OPS 5187 KH-8 4315	USAF	Low Earth	Reconnaissance	In orbit	Successful
7 August; 21:36	(United States) Thorad-SLV2G Agena-D		(United States) Vandenberg SLC-3W			
7 August; 21:36	(United States) OPS 5955 KH-4B 1104		Low Earth	Reconnaissance	In orbit	Successful
8 August; 20:12	(United States) Scout B		(United States) Vandenberg SLC-5			
8 August; 20:12	(United States) Explorer 39 (AD C)	NASA	Low Earth	Research	22 June 1981	Successful
8 August; 20:12	(United States) Explorer 40 (Injun 5)	NASA	Low Earth	Research	In orbit	Successful
9 August; 07:00	(Soviet Union) Voskhod		(Soviet Union) Baikonur Site 31/6			
9 August; 07:00	(Soviet Union) Kosmos 235 (Zenit-2 #64)	GRU	Low Earth Orbit	Reconnaissance	In orbit	Successful
10 August; 22:33	(United States) Atlas-SLV3 Centaur-D	AC-17	(United States) Cape Canaveral SLC-36A			
10 August; 22:33	(United States) ATS-4	NASA	Geosynchronous (planned); Low Earth orbit (achieved)	Communications/Meteorology	17 October	Partial failure
10 August; 22:33	Centaur failed to restart, payload inserted into lower than planned orbit					
16 August; 11:24	(United States) Delta N	D-58	(United States) Vandenberg SLC-2E			
16 August; 11:24	(United States) ESSA-7	ESSA	Low Earth	Meteorology	In orbit	Successful
16 August; 20:57	(United States) Atlas SLV-3 Burner-2		(United States) Vandenberg SLC-3E			
16 August; 20:57	(United States) Orbiscal 1	USAF	Low Earth	Technology Demonstration	16 August	Failure
16 August; 20:57	(United States) OV5 8 (ERS 19)	USAF	Low Earth	Technology Demonstration	16 August	Failure
16 August; 20:57	(United States) Gridsphere 1	USAF	Low Earth	Technology Demonstration	16 August	Failure
16 August; 20:57	(United States) Gridsphere 2	USAF	Low Earth	Technology Demonstration	16 August	Failure
16 August; 20:57	(United States) MylarBalloon	USAF	Low Earth	Technology Demonstration	16 August	Failure
16 August; 20:57	(United States) Rigidsphere	USAF	Low Earth	Technology Demonstration	16 August	Failure
16 August; 20:57	(United States) LCS 3	MIT Lincoln Laboratory	Low Earth	Calibration	16 August	Failure
16 August; 20:57	(United States) LIDOS	USAF	Low Earth	Geodesy	16 August	Failure
16 August; 20:57	(United States) SECOR 11	US Army	Low Earth	Geodesy	16 August	Failure
16 August; 20:57	(United States) SECOR 12	US Army	Low Earth	Geodesy	16 August	Failure
16 August; 20:57	(United States) Radcat		Low Earth	Calibration	16 August	Failure
16 August; 20:57	(United States) RM 18 & UVR	USAF	Low Earth	Technology Demonstration	16 August	Failure
16 August; 20:57	Payload fairing failed to separate					
27 August; 11:29	(Soviet Union) Kosmos-3		(Soviet Union) Baikonur Site 41/15			
27 August; 11:29	(Soviet Union) Kosmos 236 (Strela-2 #5)		Low Earth Orbit	Military communications	In orbit	Successful
27 August; 12:29	(Soviet Union) Voskhod		(Soviet Union) Plesetsk Site 41/1			
27 August; 12:29	(Soviet Union) Kosmos 237 (Zenit-4 #46)	GRU	Low Earth Orbit	Reconnaissance	In orbit	Successful
28 August; 10:04	(Soviet Union) Soyuz		(Soviet Union) Baikonur Site 31/6			
28 August; 10:04	(Soviet Union) Kosmos 238 (Soyuz Test #7)		Low Earth Orbit	Test spacecraft	1 September; 09:03	Successful

=== September ===
September launches
Date and time (UTC)	Rocket	Flight number	Launch site		LSP	
Date and time (UTC)	Payload	Operator	Orbit	Function	Decay (UTC)	Outcome
Date and time (UTC)	Remarks					
5 September; 07:00	(Soviet Union) Voskhod		(Soviet Union) Baikonur Site 31/6			
5 September; 07:00	(Soviet Union) Kosmos 239 (Zenit-4 #47)	GRU	Low Earth Orbit	Reconnaissance	In orbit	Successful
10 September; 18:30	(United States) Titan IIIB Agena-D		(United States) Vandenberg SLC-4W			
10 September; 18:30	(United States) OPS 5247 KH-8 4316	USAF	Low Earth	Reconnaissance	In orbit	Successful
14 September; 06:50	(Soviet Union) Voskhod		(Soviet Union) Baikonur Site 31/6			
14 September; 06:50	(Soviet Union) Kosmos 240 (Zenit-2 #65)	GRU	Low Earth Orbit	Reconnaissance	In orbit	Successful
14 September; 21:42	(Soviet Union) Proton K / Blok D		(Soviet Union) Pad 81/23, Baikonur		MOM	
14 September; 21:42	(Soviet Union) Zond 5 (L1 9)	MOM	Lunar Free-return	Prototype Soyuz 7K-L1P/Zond	21 September; 16:08	Successful
16 September; 12:30	(Soviet Union) Voskhod		(Soviet Union) Site 41/1, Plesetsk			
16 September; 12:30	(Soviet Union) Kosmos 241 (Zenit-4 #48)	GRU	Low Earth Orbit	Reconnaissance	In orbit	Successful
18 September; 21:32	(United States) Thorad-SLV2G Agena-D		(United States) Vandenberg SLC-1E			
18 September; 21:32	(United States) OPS 0165 KH-4A 1048		Low Earth	Reconnaissance	In orbit	Successful
18 September; 21:32	(United States) OPS 8595 Vampan 1	USAF	Low Earth	ELINT	In orbit	Successful
19 September; 00:09	(United States) Delta M	D-59	(United States) Cape Canaveral LC-17A			
19 September; 00:09	(United Nations) Intelsat III F1	Intelsat	Geosynchronous	Communications	19 September	Failure
20 September; 14:39	(Soviet Union) Kosmos-2		(Soviet Union) Plesetsk Site 133/1			
20 September; 14:39	(Soviet Union) Kosmos 242 (DS-P1-I #4)		Low Earth Orbit	Radar calibration	In orbit	Successful
23 September; 07:39	(Soviet Union) Voskhod		(Soviet Union) Baikonur Site 1/5			
23 September; 07:39	(Soviet Union) Kosmos 243 (Zenit-2M #3, Gektor #3 & Nauka-2KS 1L)		Low Earth Orbit	Reconnaissance	In orbit	Successful
26 September; 07:37	(United States) Titan IIIC		(United States) Cape Canaveral SLC-41			
26 September; 07:37	(United States) LES 6	USAF	Geosynchronous	Technology Demonstration	In orbit	Successful
26 September; 07:37	(United States) OV2 5	USAF	Low Earth	Technology Demonstration	In orbit	Successful
26 September; 07:37	(United States) OV5 2 (ERS 21)	USAF	Low Earth	Technology Demonstration	In orbit	Successful
26 September; 07:37	(United States) OV5 4 (ERS 28)	USAF	Low Earth	Technology Demonstration	In orbit	Successful

=== October ===
October launches
Date and time (UTC)	Rocket	Flight number	Launch site		LSP	
Date and time (UTC)	Payload	Operator	Orbit	Function	Decay (UTC)	Outcome
Date and time (UTC)	Remarks					
2 October; 13:35	(Soviet Union) R-36-O		(Soviet Union) Baikonur Site 161/35			
2 October; 13:35	(Soviet Union) Kosmos 244 (OGCh #20)	RVSN	Low Earth Orbit	FOBS test	2 October	Successful
3 October; 12:58	(Soviet Union) Kosmos-2		(Soviet Union) Plesetsk Site 133/1			
3 October; 12:58	(Soviet Union) Kosmos 245 (DS-P1-Yu #16)		Low Earth Orbit	Radar calibration	In orbit	Successful
3 October; 20:49	(United States) Scout-B		(United States) Vandenberg SLC-5			
3 October; 20:49	(European Union) ESRO 1A (Aurorae)	ESRO	Low Earth	Technology Demonstration	In orbit	Successful
5 October; 00:32	(Soviet Union) Molniya-M / Blok ML		(Soviet Union) Baikonur Site 1/5			
5 October; 00:32	(Soviet Union) Molniya-1 10		Molniya	Communications	In orbit	Successful
5 October; 11:16	(United States) Thorad-SLV2G Agena-D		(United States) Vandenberg SLC-1W			
5 October; 11:16	(United States) OPS 0964 Strawman 1	USAF	Low Earth	ELINT, SIGINT	In orbit	Successful
7 October; 12:05	(Soviet Union) Voskhod		(Soviet Union) Plesetsk Site 41/1			
7 October; 12:05	(Soviet Union) Kosmos 246 (Zenit-4 #49)	GRU	Low Earth Orbit	Reconnaissance	In orbit	Successful
11 October; 12:05	(Soviet Union) Voskhod		(Soviet Union) Plesetsk Site 41/1			
11 October; 12:05	(Soviet Union) Kosmos 247 (Zenit-2 #66)	GRU	Low Earth Orbit	Reconnaissance	In orbit	Successful
11 October 1968; 15:02	(United States) Saturn IB (C-1B)		(United States) LC-34, Cape Canaveral		(United States) NASA	
11 October 1968; 15:02	(United States) Apollo 7	NASA	LEO	Crewed orbital flight	22 October 1968; 11:11:48	Successful
11 October 1968; 15:02	First crewed Apollo flight					
19 October; 04:20	(Soviet Union) Tsyklon-2A		(Soviet Union) Baikonur Site 90/19			
19 October; 04:20	(Soviet Union) Kosmos 248 (I2M #2)		Low Earth Orbit	ASAT target	In orbit	Successful
20 October; 04:02	(Soviet Union) Tsyklon-2A		(Soviet Union) Site 90/20, Baikonur			
20 October; 04:02	(Soviet Union) Kosmos 249 (I2P #1)		Low Earth Orbit	ASAT test	In orbit	Successful
23 October; 04:34	(United States) Thor LV-2F Burner 2		(United States) Vandenberg SLC-10W			
23 October; 04:34	(United States) OPS 4078 DSMP-4B F2		Low Earth (SSO)	Meteorology	In orbit	Successful
25 October; 09:00	(Soviet Union) Soyuz		(Soviet Union) Baikonur Site 1/5		(Soviet Union) RVSN	
25 October; 09:00	(Soviet Union) Soyuz 2		Low Earth orbit	Docking target for Soyuz 3	28 October 1968; 07:21	Successful
25 October; 09:00	Soyuz 3 failed to dock					
26 October; 08:34	(Soviet Union) Soyuz		(Soviet Union) Baikonur Site 31/6		(Soviet Union) RVSN	
26 October; 08:34	(Soviet Union) Soyuz 3		Low Earth orbit	Crewed orbital flight	30 October 1968; 07:25:03	Partial Failure
26 October; 08:34	Failed to dock with Soyuz 2					
30 October; 22:00	(Soviet Union) Kosmos-3M		(Soviet Union) Plesetsk Site 132/2			
30 October; 22:00	(Soviet Union) Kosmos 250 (Tselina-O #3)		Low Earth Orbit	SIGINT	In orbit	Successful
31 October; 09:14	(Soviet Union) Voskhod		(Soviet Union) Baikonur Site 1/5			
31 October; 09:14	(Soviet Union) Kosmos 251 (Zenit-4M #1, Rotor #1)	GRU	Low Earth Orbit	Reconnaissance	In orbit	Successful

=== November ===
November launches
Date and time (UTC)	Rocket	Flight number	Launch site		LSP	
Date and time (UTC)	Payload	Operator	Orbit	Function	Decay (UTC)	Outcome
Date and time (UTC)	Remarks					
1 November; 00:27	(Soviet Union) Tsyklon-2A		(Soviet Union) Baikonur Site 90/20			
1 November; 00:27	(Soviet Union) Kosmos 252 (I2P #2)		Low Earth Orbit	ASAT	In orbit	Successful
3 November; 21:30	(United States) Thorad-SLV2G Agena-D		(United States) Vandenberg SLC-3W			
3 November; 21:30	(United States) OPS 1315 KH-4B 1105		Low Earth	Reconnaissance	In orbit	Successful
6 November; 19:10	(United States) Titan IIIB Agena-D		(United States) Vandenberg SLC-4W			
6 November; 19:10	(United States) OPS 5296 KH-8 4317	USAF	Low Earth	Reconnaissance	In orbit	Successful
8 November; 09:46	(United States) Delta E1	D-60	(United States) Cape Canaveral SLC-17B			
8 November; 09:46	(United States) Pioneer 9	NASA	Heliocentric	Solar Orbiter	In orbit	Successful
8 November; 09:46	(United States) TTS 2	NASA	Low Earth	Technology Demonstration	In orbit	Successful
10 November; 19:11	(Soviet Union) Proton K / Blok D		(Soviet Union) Baikonur Site 81/23		MOM	
10 November; 19:11	(Soviet Union) Zond 6 (L1 12)	MOM	Lunar Free-return	Prototype Soyuz 7K-L1P/Zond	17 November; 14:10	Successful
13 November; 12:00	(Soviet Union) Voskhod		(Soviet Union) Plesetsk Site 41/1			
13 November; 12:00	(Soviet Union) Kosmos 253 (Zenit-2 #67)	GRU	Low Earth Orbit	Reconnaissance	In orbit	Successful
16 November; 11:40	(Soviet Union) Proton K		(Soviet Union) Baikonur Site 81/24		MOM	
16 November; 11:40	(Soviet Union) Proton 4	MOM	Low Earth	Cosmic ray research	24 July 1969	Successful
21 November; 12:10	(Soviet Union) Voskhod		(Soviet Union) Plesetsk Site 41/1			
21 November; 12:10	(Soviet Union) Kosmos 254 (Zenit-4 #50)	GRU	Low Earth Orbit	Reconnaissance	In orbit	Successful
29 November; 12:40	(Soviet Union) Voskhod		(Soviet Union) Plesetsk Site 41/1			
29 November; 12:40	(Soviet Union) Kosmos 255 (Zenit-2 #68)	GRU	Low Earth Orbit	Reconnaissance	In orbit	Successful
29 November; 23:12	(European Union) Europa 1	F7	(Australia) Woomera Test Range LA-6A			
29 November; 23:12	(European Union) STV 1	ELDO	Low Earth Orbit	Dummy Payload	29 November	Failure
29 November; 23:12	Third stage failure after separation					
30 November; 12:00	(Soviet Union) Kosmos-3M		(Soviet Union) Plesetsk Site 132/2			
30 November; 12:00	(Soviet Union) Kosmos 256 (Sfera #3)		Low Earth Orbit	Geodesy	In orbit	Successful

=== December ===
December launches
Date and time (UTC)	Rocket	Flight number	Launch site		LSP	
Date and time (UTC)	Payload	Operator	Orbit	Function	Decay (UTC)	Outcome
Date and time (UTC)	Remarks					
3 December; 14:52	(Soviet Union) Kosmos-2		(Soviet Union) Plesetsk Site 133/1			
3 December; 14:52	(Soviet Union) Kosmos 257 (DS-P1-Yu #17)		Low Earth Orbit	Radar calibration	5 March 1969	Successful
4 December; 19:23	(United States) Titan IIIB Agena-D		(United States) Vandenberg SLC-4W			
4 December; 19:23	(United States) OPS 6518 KH-8 4318	USAF	Low Earth	Reconnaissance	In orbit	Failure
5 December; 18:55	(United States) Delta E1	D-61	(United States) Cape Canaveral LC-17B			
5 December; 18:55	(European Union) HEOS 1	ESRO	Low Earth	Research	28 October 1975	Successful
7 December; 08:40	(United States) Atlas-SLV3 Agena-D	AC-16	(United States) Cape Canaveral LC-36B			
7 December; 08:40	(United States) OAO 2	NASA	Low Earth	UV astronomy	In orbit	Successful
10 December; 08:25	(Soviet Union) Voskhod		(Soviet Union) Baikonur Site 31/6			
10 December; 08:25	(Soviet Union) Kosmos 258 (Zenit-2 #69)	GRU	Low Earth Orbit	Reconnaissance	In orbit	Successful
12 December; 22:22	(United States) Thorad-SLV2G Agena-D		(United States) Vandenberg SLC-3W			
12 December; 22:22	(United States) OPS 4740 KH-4A 1049	CIA	Low Earth	Reconnaissance	In orbit	Successful
12 December; 22:22	(United States) OPS 7684 P-801 1	USAF	Low Earth	ELINT	In orbit	Successful
14 December; 05:09	(Soviet Union) Kosmos-2		(Soviet Union) Kapustin Yar Site 86/1			
14 December; 05:09	(Soviet Union) Kosmos 259 (DS-U2-I #3)		Low Earth Orbit	Ionosphere research	5 May 1969	Successful
15 December; 17:21	(United States) Delta N		(United States) Vandenberg SLC-2E			
15 December; 17:21	(United States) ESSA-8	ESSA	SSO	Meteorology	In orbit	Successful
16 December; 09:15	(Soviet Union) Molniya-M / Blok ML		(Soviet Union) Site 1/5, Baikonur			
16 December; 09:15	(Soviet Union) Kosmos 260 (Molniya-1 Yu 15L)		Molniya	Technology Demonstration	In orbit	Successful
19 December; 00:32	(United States) Delta M	D-63	(United States) Cape Canaveral LC-17A			
19 December; 00:32	(United Nations) Intelsat III F2	Intelsat	Geosynchronous	Communications	In orbit	Successful
19 December; 23:55	(Soviet Union) Kosmos-2		(Soviet Union) Plesetsk Site 133/1			
19 December; 23:55	(Soviet Union) Kosmos 261 (DS-U2-GK #1)		Low Earth Orbit	Aeronomy, auroral research	12 February 1969	Successful
21 December; 12:51	(United States) Saturn V (C-5)		(United States) LC-39A, Kennedy		(United States) NASA	
21 December; 12:51	(United States) Apollo 8	NASA	Selenocentric	Crewed lunar orbiter	27 December 1968; 15:51:42	Successful
21 December; 12:51	(United States) LTA B	NASA	Selenocentric	Mass Model	In orbit	Successful
21 December; 12:51	First crewed mission to the Moon					
26 December; 09:45	(Soviet Union) Kosmos-2		(Soviet Union) Kapustin Yar Site 86/1			
26 December; 09:45	(Soviet Union) Kosmos 262 (DS-U2-GF #1)		Low Earth Orbit	Solar research	18 July 1969	Successful

- ← Jan
- Feb
- Mar
- Apr
- May
- Jun
- Jul
- Aug
- Sep
- Oct
- Nov
- Dec →

== Suborbital Launches ==
- ← Jan
- Feb
- Mar
- Apr
- May
- Jun
- Jul
- Aug
- Sep
- Oct
- Nov
- Dec →

=== January–December ===
Date and time (UTC)	Rocket	Flight number	Launch site		LSP	
Date and time (UTC)	Payload	Operator	Orbit	Function	Decay (UTC)	Outcome
Date and time (UTC)	Remarks					
28 March	(Soviet Union) Kosmos-3		(Soviet Union) Baikonur Site 41/15			
28 March	(Soviet Union) VKZ #2		Suborbital	Aeronomy, ionosphere and radiation belt research	28 March	Successful
28 March	Launched on the strictly vertical trajectory. Apogee: about 4,000 km					
20 May; 22:05	(Soviet Union) R-36-O		(Soviet Union) Baikonur Site 162/36		(Soviet Union) RVSN	
20 May; 22:05	(Soviet Union) OGCh #18	RVSN	Suborbital	Missile test	20 May	Successful
27 May; 23:15	(Soviet Union) R-36-O		(Soviet Union) Baikonur Site 161/35		(Soviet Union) RVSN	
27 May; 23:15	(Soviet Union) OGCh #19	RVSN	Suborbital	Missile test	27 May	Successful
8 August	(China) T-7/GF-01A		(China) Jiuquan			
8 August	(China)	CAST	Suborbital	Test flight	8 August	Successful
8 August	Test of high-altitude ignition of the FG-02 solid rocket motor. Apogee: 311 km					
20 August	(China) T-7/GF-01A		(China) Jiuquan			
20 August	(China)	CAST	Suborbital	Test flight	20 August	Successful
20 August	Test of high-altitude ignition of the FG-02 solid rocket motor. Apogee: 311 km					

- ← Jan
- Feb
- Mar
- Apr
- May
- Jun
- Jul
- Aug
- Sep
- Oct
- Nov
- Dec →
