= Kosmos 259 =

Soviet ionosphere research satellite

- Mission type: Ionospheric
- COSPAR ID: 1968-113A
- SATCAT no.: 03612

Spacecraft properties
- Spacecraft type: DS-U2-I
- Manufacturer: Yuzhnoye
- Launch mass: 325 kilograms (717 lb)

Start of mission
- Launch date: 14 December 1968, 05:09:54 UTC
- Rocket: Kosmos-2I 63SM
- Launch site: Kapustin Yar 86/4

End of mission
- Decay date: 5 May 1969

Orbital parameters
- Reference system: Geocentric
- Regime: Low Earth
- Perigee altitude: 212 kilometres (132 mi)
- Apogee altitude: 1,210 kilometres (750 mi)
- Inclination: 48.4 degrees
- Period: 99 minutes

Kosmos 259 (Russian: Космос 259 meaning Cosmos 259), also known as DS-U2-I No.3, was a Soviet satellite which was launched in 1968 as part of the Dnepropetrovsk Sputnik programme. It was a 325-kilogram (717 lb) spacecraft, which was built by the Yuzhnoye Design Bureau, and was used to study the effects on radio waves of passing through the ionosphere.

A Kosmos-2I 63SM carrier rocket was used to launch Kosmos 259 into low Earth orbit. The launch took place from Site 86/4 at Kapustin Yar. The launch occurred at 05:09:54 UTC on 14 December 1968, and resulted in the successful insertion of the satellite into orbit. Upon reaching orbit, the satellite was assigned its Kosmos designation, and received the International Designator 1968-113A. The North American Aerospace Defense Command assigned it the catalogue number 03612.

Kosmos 259 was the third and final DS-U2-I satellite to be launched. It was operated in an orbit with a perigee of 212 kilometres (132 mi), an apogee of 1,210 kilometres (750 mi), 48.4 degrees of inclination, and an orbital period of 99 minutes. On 5 May 1969, it decayed from orbit and reentered the atmosphere.

== See also ==
- 1968 in spaceflight
