= Kosmos 261 =

Soviet upper atmosphere research satellite

- Mission type: Aeronomy; Auroral
- COSPAR ID: 1968–117A
- SATCAT no.: 03624

Spacecraft properties
- Spacecraft type: DS-U2-GK
- Manufacturer: Yuzhnoye
- Launch mass: 347 kilograms (765 lb)

Start of mission
- Launch date: 19 December 1968, 23:55:00 UTC
- Rocket: Kosmos-2I 63SM
- Launch site: Plesetsk 133/1

End of mission
- Decay date: 12 February 1969

Orbital parameters
- Reference system: Geocentric
- Regime: Low Earth
- Perigee altitude: 201 kilometres (125 mi)
- Apogee altitude: 611 kilometres (380 mi)
- Inclination: 71 degrees
- Period: 92.68 minutes

Kosmos 261 (Russian: Космос 261, lit. 'Cosmos 261'), also known as DS-U2-GK No.1, was a Soviet satellite which was launched in 1968 as part of the Dnepropetrovsk Sputnik programme. It was a 347-kilogram (765 lb) spacecraft, which was built by the Yuzhnoye Design Bureau, and was used to study the density of air in the upper atmosphere, and investigate aurorae. Kosmos 261 set the way for the Intercosmos Program. Hungary, Poland, Romania, Czechoslovakia, DDR and Bulgaria were the six Soviet Bloc countries that collaborated in the experiments on board the satellite.

A Kosmos-2I 63SM carrier rocket was used to launch Kosmos 261 into low Earth orbit from Site 133/1 at the Plesetsk Cosmodrome. The launch occurred at 23:55:00 UTC on 19 December 1968, and resulted in the successful insertion of the satellite into orbit. Upon reaching orbit, the satellite was assigned its Kosmos designation, and received the International Designator 1968-117A. The North American Aerospace Defense Command assigned it the catalogue number 03624.

Kosmos 261 was the first of two DS-U2-GK satellites to be launched. It was operated in an orbit with a perigee of 201 kilometres (125 mi), an apogee of 611 kilometres (380 mi), 71 degrees of inclination, and an orbital period of 92.68 minutes. It decayed from orbit and reentered the atmosphere on 12 February 1969.

== See also ==
- 1968 in spaceflight
