= Kosmos 257 =

Soviet radar calibration target satellite

- Mission type: ABM radar target
- COSPAR ID: 1968-107A
- SATCAT no.: 03578

Spacecraft properties
- Spacecraft type: DS-P1-Yu
- Manufacturer: Yuzhnoye
- Launch mass: 325 kilograms (717 lb)

Start of mission
- Launch date: 3 December 1968, 14:52:21 UTC
- Rocket: Kosmos-2I 63SM
- Launch site: Plesetsk 133/1

End of mission
- Decay date: 5 March 1969

Orbital parameters
- Reference system: Geocentric
- Regime: Low Earth
- Perigee altitude: 261 kilometres (162 mi)
- Apogee altitude: 396 kilometres (246 mi)
- Inclination: 70.9 degrees
- Period: 91.10 minutes

Kosmos 257 (Russian: Космос 257 meaning Cosmos 257), known before launch as DS-P1-Yu No.17, was a Soviet satellite which was used as a radar calibration target for tests of anti-ballistic missiles. It was built by the Yuzhnoye Design Bureau, and launched in 1968 as part of the Dnepropetrovsk Sputnik programme. It had a mass of 325 kilograms (717 lb).

Kosmos 257 was launched from Site 133/1 at Plesetsk, atop a Kosmos-2I 63SM carrier rocket. The launch occurred on 3 December 1968 at 14:52:21 UTC, and resulted in Kosmos 257's successful deployment into low Earth orbit. Upon reaching orbit, it was assigned its Kosmos designation, and received the International Designator 1968-107A.

Kosmos 257 was operated in an orbit with a perigee of 261 kilometres (162 mi), an apogee of 396 kilometres (246 mi), 70.9 degrees of inclination, and an orbital period of 91.10 minutes. It remained in orbit until it decayed and reentered the atmosphere on 5 March 1969. It was the seventeenth of seventy nine DS-P1-Yu satellites to be launched, and the sixteenth of seventy two to successfully reach orbit.

== See also ==
- 1968 in spaceflight
