= Kosmos 262 =

Soviet sun research satellite

- Mission type: Solar
- COSPAR ID: 1968-119A
- SATCAT no.: 03629

Spacecraft properties
- Spacecraft type: DS-U2-GF
- Manufacturer: Yuzhnoye
- Launch mass: 352 kilograms (776 lb)

Start of mission
- Launch date: 26 December 1968, 09:45:01 UTC
- Rocket: Kosmos-2I 63SM
- Launch site: Kapustin Yar 86/4

End of mission
- Decay date: 18 July 1969

Orbital parameters
- Reference system: Geocentric
- Regime: Low Earth
- Perigee altitude: 255 kilometres (158 mi)
- Apogee altitude: 747 kilometres (464 mi)
- Inclination: 48.4 degrees
- Period: 94.6 minutes

Kosmos 262 (Russian: Космос 262 meaning Cosmos 262), also known as DS-U2-GF No.1, was a Soviet satellite which was launched in 1968 as part of the Dnepropetrovsk Sputnik programme. It was a 352-kilogram (776 lb) spacecraft, which was built by the Yuzhnoye Design Bureau, and was used to study the Sun.

A Kosmos-2I 63SM carrier rocket was used to launch Kosmos 262 into low Earth orbit. The launch occurred at 09:45:01 UTC on 26 December 1968, and resulted in the successful insertion of the satellite into orbit. It took place from Site 86/4 at Kapustin Yar. Upon reaching orbit, the satellite was assigned its Kosmos designation, and received the International Designator 1968-119A. The North American Aerospace Defense Command assigned it the catalogue number 03629.

Kosmos 262 was the first satellite to study VUV (Vacuum Ultraviolet light). The satellite was also first to study soft X-Ray radiation from the stars, the Sun and the Earth's upper atmosphere. The craft used three 16-channel photometers. The results were made public in October 1969.

Kosmos 262 was the only DS-U2-GF satellite to be launched. It was operated in an orbit with a perigee of 255 kilometres (158 mi), an apogee of 747 kilometres (464 mi), 48.4 degrees of inclination, and an orbital period of 94.6 minutes. It completed operations on 3 May 1969, before decaying from orbit and reentering the atmosphere on 18 July.

== See also ==
- 1968 in spaceflight
