= Kosmos 202 =

Soviet satellite

- Mission type: Technology
- COSPAR ID: 1968-010A
- SATCAT no.: 03128
- Mission duration: 33 days

Spacecraft properties
- Spacecraft type: DS-U2-V
- Manufacturer: Yuzhnoye
- Launch mass: 325 kg

Start of mission
- Launch date: 20 February 1968, 10:03:11 GMT
- Rocket: Kosmos-2I 63SM
- Launch site: Kapustin Yar, Site 86/4
- Contractor: Yuzhnoye

End of mission
- Decay date: 24 March 1968

Orbital parameters
- Reference system: Geocentric
- Regime: Low Earth
- Perigee altitude: 213 km
- Apogee altitude: 482 km
- Inclination: 48.4°
- Period: 91.5 minutes
- Epoch: 20 February 1968

Kosmos 202 (Russian: Космос 202 meaning Cosmos 202), also known as DS-U2-V No.4, was a Soviet satellite which was launched in 1968 as part of the Dnepropetrovsk Sputnik programme. It was a 325 kilograms (717 lb) spacecraft, which was built by the Yuzhnoye Design Office, and was used to conduct classified technology development experiments for the Soviet armed forces.

A Kosmos-2I 63SM carrier rocket was used to launch Kosmos 202 into low Earth orbit. The launch took place from Site 86/4 at Kapustin Yar. The launch occurred at 10:03:11 GMT on 20 February 1968, and resulted in the successful insertion of the satellite into orbit. Upon reaching orbit, the satellite was assigned its Kosmos designation, and received the International Designator 1968-010A. The North American Air Defense Command assigned it the catalogue number 03128.

Kosmos 202 was the last of four DS-U2-V satellites to be launched. It was operated in an orbit with a perigee of 213 kilometres (132 mi), an apogee of 482 kilometres (300 mi), an inclination of 48.4°, and an orbital period of 91.5 minutes. On 24 March 1968, it decayed from orbit and reentered the atmosphere.

== See also ==
- 1968 in spaceflight
