= Kosmos 225 =

Soviet satellite studying cosmic rays

- Mission type: Magnetosphere
- COSPAR ID: 1968-048A
- SATCAT no.: 03279
- Mission duration: 144 days

Spacecraft properties
- Spacecraft type: DS-U1-Ya
- Manufacturer: Yuzhnoye
- Launch mass: 400 kg

Start of mission
- Launch date: 11 June 1968, 21:29:54 GMT
- Rocket: Kosmos-2I 63SM
- Launch site: Kapustin Yar, Site 86/4
- Contractor: Yuzhnoye

End of mission
- Last contact: 29 June 1968
- Decay date: 2 November 1968

Orbital parameters
- Reference system: Geocentric
- Regime: Low Earth
- Perigee altitude: 255 km
- Apogee altitude: 512 km
- Inclination: 48.4°
- Period: 92.2 minutes
- Epoch: 11 June 1968

Kosmos 225 (Russian: Космос 225 meaning Cosmos 225), also known as DS-U1-Ya No.2, was a Soviet satellite which was launched in 1968 as part of the Dnepropetrovsk Sputnik programme. It was a 400 kilograms (880 lb) spacecraft, which was built by the Yuzhnoye Design Bureau, and was used to investigate cosmic rays and flows of charged particles in the Earth's magnetosphere.

A Kosmos-2I 63SM carrier rocket was used to launch Kosmos 225 into low Earth orbit. The launch took place from Site 86/4 at Kapustin Yar. The launch occurred at 21:29:54 GMT on 11 June 1968, and resulted in the successful insertion of the satellite into orbit. Upon reaching orbit, the satellite was assigned its Kosmos designation, and received the International Designator 1968-048A. The North American Air Defense Command assigned it the catalogue number 03279.

Kosmos 225 was the second of two DS-U1-Ya satellites to be launched, but the only one to successfully reach orbit; the DS-U1-Ya No.1 satellite having been lost in a launch failure, on 6 March 1968, due to a second stage malfunction, 216 seconds into its flight. Kosmos 225 was operated in an orbit with a perigee of 255 kilometres (158 mi), an apogee of 512 kilometres (318 mi), an inclination of 48.4°, and an orbital period of 92.2 minutes. It completed operations on 29 June 1968, before decaying from orbit and reentering the atmosphere on 2 November 1968.

== See also ==
- 1968 in spaceflight
