= Kosmos 233 =

Soviet radar calibration target satellite

- Mission type: ABM radar target
- COSPAR ID: 1968-061A
- SATCAT no.: 03326
- Mission duration: 204 days

Spacecraft properties
- Spacecraft type: DS-P1-Yu
- Manufacturer: Yuzhnoye
- Launch mass: 325 kg

Start of mission
- Launch date: 18 July 1968, 19:59:50 GMT
- Rocket: Kosmos-2I 63SM
- Launch site: Plesetsk, Site 133/3
- Contractor: Yuzhnoye

End of mission
- Decay date: 7 February 1969

Orbital parameters
- Reference system: Geocentric
- Regime: Low Earth
- Perigee altitude: 198 km
- Apogee altitude: 1514 km
- Inclination: 82.0°
- Period: 102.1 minutes
- Epoch: 18 July 1968

Kosmos 233 (Russian: Космос 233 meaning Cosmos 233), known before launch as DS-P1-Yu No.15, was a Soviet satellite which was used as a radar calibration target for tests of anti-ballistic missiles. It was built by the Yuzhnoye Design Bureau, and launched in 1968 as part of the Dnepropetrovsk Sputnik programme. It had a mass of 325 kilograms (717 lb).

Kosmos 233 was launched from Site 133/3 at the Plesetsk Cosmodrome, atop a Kosmos-2I 63SM carrier rocket. The launch occurred on 18 July 1968 at 19:59:50 UTC, and resulted in Kosmos 233's successful deployment into low Earth orbit. Upon reaching orbit, it was assigned its Kosmos designation, and received the International Designator 1968-061A.

Kosmos 233 was operated in an orbit with a perigee of 198 kilometres (123 mi), an apogee of 1,514 kilometres (941 mi), an inclination of 82.0°, and an orbital period of 102.1 minutes. It remained in orbit until it decayed and reentered the atmosphere on 7 February 1969. It was the fifteenth of seventy nine DS-P1-Yu satellites to be launched, and the fourteenth of seventy two to successfully reach orbit.

== See also ==
- 1968 in spaceflight
