= Kosmos 221 =

Soviet radar calibration target satellite

- Mission type: ABM radar target
- COSPAR ID: 1968-043A
- SATCAT no.: 03269
- Mission duration: 464 days

Spacecraft properties
- Spacecraft type: DS-P1-Yu
- Manufacturer: Yuzhnoye
- Launch mass: 400 kg

Start of mission
- Launch date: 24 May 1968, 07:04:50 GMT
- Rocket: Kosmos-2I 63SM
- Launch site: Kapustin Yar, Site 86/4
- Contractor: Yuzhnoye

End of mission
- Decay date: 31 August 1969

Orbital parameters
- Reference system: Geocentric
- Regime: Low Earth
- Perigee altitude: 218 km
- Apogee altitude: 2086 km
- Inclination: 48.4°
- Period: 108.3 minutes
- Epoch: 24 May 1968

Kosmos 221 (Russian: Космос 221 meaning Cosmos 221), also known as DS-P1-Yu No.14, was a Soviet satellite which was used as a radar calibration target for tests of anti-ballistic missiles. It was built by the Yuzhnoye Design Bureau, and launched in 1968 as part of the Dnepropetrovsk Sputnik programme. It had a mass of 400 kilograms (880 lb).

Kosmos 221 was launched from Site 86/4 at Kapustin Yar, atop a Kosmos-2I 63SM carrier rocket. The launch occurred on 24 May 1968 at 07:04:50 GMT, and resulted in Kosmos 221's successful deployment into low Earth orbit. Upon reaching orbit, it was assigned its Kosmos designation, and received the International Designator 1968-043A.

Kosmos 221 was operated in an orbit with a perigee of 218 kilometres (135 mi), an apogee of 2,086 kilometres (1,296 mi), an inclination of 48.4°, and an orbital period of 108.3 minutes. It remained in orbit until it decayed and reentered the atmosphere on 31 August 1969. It was the thirteenth of seventy nine DS-P1-Yu satellites to be launched, and the twelfth of seventy two to successfully reach orbit.

== See also ==
- 1968 in spaceflight
