= Kosmos 242 =

Soviet radar calibration target satellite

- Mission type: ABM radar target
- COSPAR ID: 1968-079A
- SATCAT no.: 03414

Spacecraft properties
- Spacecraft type: DS-P1-I
- Manufacturer: Yuzhnoye
- Launch mass: 325 kilograms (717 lb)

Start of mission
- Launch date: 20 September 1968, 14:39:59 UTC
- Rocket: Kosmos-2I 63SM
- Launch site: Plesetsk 133/1

End of mission
- Decay date: 13 November 1968

Orbital parameters
- Reference system: Geocentric
- Regime: Low Earth
- Perigee altitude: 272 kilometres (169 mi)
- Apogee altitude: 406 kilometres (252 mi)
- Inclination: 71 degrees
- Period: 91.3 minutes

Kosmos 242 (Russian: Космос 242 meaning Cosmos 242), also known as DS-P1-I No.4 was a satellite which was used as a radar target for anti-ballistic missile tests. It was launched by the Soviet Union in 1968 as part of the Dnepropetrovsk Sputnik programme.

It was launched aboard a Kosmos-2I 63SM rocket, from Site 133/1 at Plesetsk. The launch occurred at 14:39:59 UTC on 20 September 1968.

Kosmos 242 was placed into a low Earth orbit with a perigee of 272 kilometres (169 mi), an apogee of 406 kilometres (252 mi), 71 degrees of inclination, and an orbital period of 91.3 minutes. It decayed from orbit on 13 November 1968.

Kosmos 242 was the fourth of nineteen DS-P1-I satellites to be launched. Of these, all reached orbit successfully except the seventh.

== See also ==
- 1968 in spaceflight
