= Kosmos 222 =

Soviet radar calibration target satellite

- Mission type: ABM radar target
- COSPAR ID: 1968-044A
- SATCAT no.: 03272
- Mission duration: 134 days

Spacecraft properties
- Spacecraft type: DS-P1-Yu
- Manufacturer: Yuzhnoye
- Launch mass: 325 kg

Start of mission
- Launch date: 30 May 1968, 20:29:49 GMT
- Rocket: Kosmos-2I 63SM
- Launch site: Plesetsk, Site 133/3
- Contractor: Yuzhnoye

End of mission
- Decay date: 11 October 1968

Orbital parameters
- Reference system: Geocentric
- Regime: Low Earth
- Perigee altitude: 285 km
- Apogee altitude: 488 km
- Inclination: 71.0°
- Period: 92.3 minutes
- Epoch: 30 May 1968

Kosmos 222 (Russian: Космос 222 meaning Cosmos 222), known before launch as DS-P1-Yu No.12, was a Soviet satellite which was used as a radar calibration target for tests of anti-ballistic missiles. It was built by the Yuzhnoye Design Bureau, and launched in 1968 as part of the Dnepropetrovsk Sputnik programme. It had a mass of 325 kilograms (717 lb).

Kosmos 222 was launched from Site 133/3 at the Plesetsk Cosmodrome, atop a Kosmos-2I 63SM carrier rocket. The launch occurred on 30 May 1968 at 20:29:49 GMT, and resulted in Kosmos 222's successful deployment into low Earth orbit. Upon reaching orbit, it was assigned its Kosmos designation, and received the International Designator 1968-044A.

Kosmos 222 was operated in an orbit with a perigee of 285 kilometres (177 mi), an apogee of 488 kilometres (303 mi), an inclination of 71.0°, and an orbital period of 92.3 minutes. It remained in orbit until it decayed and reentered the atmosphere on 11 October 1968. It was the fourteenth of seventy nine DS-P1-Yu satellites to be launched, and the thirteenth of seventy two to successfully reach orbit.

== See also ==
- 1968 in spaceflight
