= Kosmos 205 =

Soviet reconnaissance satellite (Zenit 2-59)

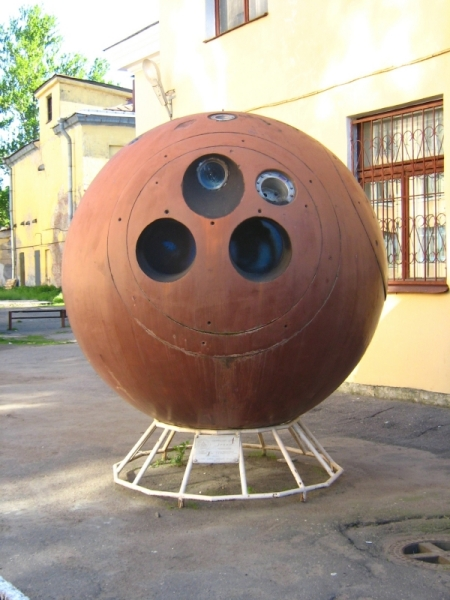
- A Zenit reentry capsule
- Names: Zenit 2-59
- Mission type: Optical imaging
- Operator: Soviet space program
- COSPAR ID: 1968-016A
- SATCAT no.: 3140
- Mission duration: 8 days

Spacecraft properties
- Spacecraft type: Zenit-2
- Launch mass: 4,000 kg (8,800 lb)

Start of mission
- Launch date: 5 March 1968; 12:30 UTC
- Rocket: Voskhod 11A57
- Launch site: Plesetsk 41/1

End of mission
- Decay date: 13 March 1968

Orbital parameters
- Reference system: Geocentric
- Regime: Low Earth
- Eccentricity: 0.00702
- Perigee altitude: 199 km (124 mi)
- Apogee altitude: 292 km (181 mi)
- Inclination: 65.7°
- Period: 89.4 minutes
- Epoch: 5 March 1968

Kosmos 205 (Russian: Космос 205 meaning Cosmos 205) or Zenit-2 No.59 was a Soviet satellite launched from the Plesetsk Cosmodrome, Soviet Union, on March 5, 1968. The R-7 Semjorka launch vehicle with an added degree set the satellite into orbit around the planet Earth. The mass of the satellite at launch was 4,000 kg (8,800 lb). Kosmos 205 was an observation satellite.

== See also ==
- 1968 in spaceflight
