= Kosmos 245 =

Soviet radar calibration target satellite

- Mission type: ABM radar target
- COSPAR ID: 1968-083A
- SATCAT no.: 03457

Spacecraft properties
- Spacecraft type: DS-P1-Yu
- Manufacturer: Yuzhnoye
- Launch mass: 325 kilograms (717 lb)

Start of mission
- Launch date: 3 October 1968, 12:58:59 UTC
- Rocket: Kosmos-2I 63SM
- Launch site: Plesetsk 133/1

End of mission
- Decay date: 15 January 1969

Orbital parameters
- Reference system: Geocentric
- Regime: Low Earth
- Perigee altitude: 260 kilometres (160 mi)
- Apogee altitude: 443 kilometres (275 mi)
- Inclination: 70.9 degrees
- Period: 91.6 minutes

Kosmos 245 (Russian: Космос 245 meaning Cosmos 245), known before launch as DS-P1-Yu No.16, was a Soviet satellite which was used as a radar calibration target for tests of anti-ballistic missiles. It was built by the Yuzhnoye Design Bureau, and launched in 1968 as part of the Dnepropetrovsk Sputnik programme. It had a mass of 325 kilograms (717 lb).

Kosmos 245 was launched from Site 133/1 at the Plesetsk Cosmodrome, atop a Kosmos-2I 63SM carrier rocket. The launch occurred on 3 October 1968 at 12:58:59 UTC, and resulted in Kosmos 245's successful deployment into low Earth orbit. Upon reaching orbit, it was assigned its Kosmos designation, and received the International Designator 1968-083A.

Kosmos 245 was operated in an orbit with a perigee of 260 kilometres (160 mi), an apogee of 443 kilometres (275 mi), 70.9 degrees of inclination, and an orbital period of 91.6 minutes. It remained in orbit until it decayed and reentered the atmosphere on 15 January 1969. It was the sixteenth of seventy nine DS-P1-Yu satellites to be launched, and the fifteenth of seventy two to successfully reach orbit.

== See also ==
- 1968 in spaceflight
