= Kosmos 215 =

Soviet satellite launched in 1968

- Mission type: Scientific
- COSPAR ID: 1968-033A
- SATCAT no.: 03205
- Mission duration: 73 days

Spacecraft properties
- Spacecraft type: DS-U1-A
- Manufacturer: Yuzhnoye
- Launch mass: 400 kg

Start of mission
- Launch date: 18 April 1968, 22:29:52 GMT
- Rocket: Kosmos-2I 63SM
- Launch site: Kapustin Yar, Site 86/4
- Contractor: Yuzhnoye

End of mission
- Last contact: 6 June 1968
- Decay date: 30 June 1968

Orbital parameters
- Reference system: Geocentric
- Regime: Low Earth
- Perigee altitude: 255 km
- Apogee altitude: 403 km
- Inclination: 48.5°
- Period: 91.1 minutes
- Epoch: 18 April 1968

Kosmos 215 (Russian: Космос 215 meaning Cosmos 215), also known as DS-U1-A No.1, was a Soviet satellite which was launched in 1968 as part of the Dnepropetrovsk Sputnik programme. It was a 385-kilogram (849 lb) spacecraft, which was built by the Yuzhnoye Design Bureau, and was used to study radiation and conduct optical observations of the atmosphere of the Earth. It was equipped with eight telescopes, including one for ultraviolet astronomy. It was primarily used to study the Sun, although several other X-ray emissions were detected.

A Kosmos-2I 63SM carrier rocket was used to launch Kosmos 215 into low Earth orbit. The launch took place from Site 86/4 at Kapustin Yar. It occurred at 22:29:52 GMT on 18 April 1968, and resulted in the successfully insertion of the satellite into orbit. Upon reaching orbit, the satellite was assigned its Kosmos designation, and received the International Designator 1968-033A. The North American Air Defense Command assigned it the catalogue number 03205.

Kosmos 215 performed ultraviolet photometry of 36 A and B stars from parallel telescopes and two UV photometers with maximum responses at 274.0 and 227.5 nanometres. Its X-ray telescope was used to measure radiation between 0.05 and 0.5 nanometres.

Kosmos 215 was the only DS-U1-A satellite to be launched, and the fourth DS-U1 across all variants. It was operated in an orbit with a perigee of 255 kilometres (158 mi), an apogee of 403 kilometres (250 mi), an inclination of 48.5°, and an orbital period of 91.1 minutes. It completed operations on 6 June 1968. On 30 June 1968, it decayed from orbit and reentered the atmosphere.

== See also ==
- 1968 in spaceflight
