= Kosmos 204 =

Soviet artificial satellite

- Mission type: ABM radar target
- COSPAR ID: 1968-015A
- SATCAT no.: 03139
- Mission duration: 362 days

Spacecraft properties
- Spacecraft type: DS-P1-I
- Manufacturer: Yuzhnoye
- Launch mass: 400 kg

Start of mission
- Launch date: 5 March 1968, 18:28:00 GMT
- Rocket: Kosmos-2I 63SM
- Launch site: Plesetsk Site 133/3
- Contractor: Yuzhnoye

End of mission
- Decay date: 2 March 1969

Orbital parameters
- Reference system: Geocentric
- Regime: Low Earth
- Perigee altitude: 204 km
- Apogee altitude: 844 km
- Inclination: 70.0°
- Period: 95.9 minutes
- Epoch: 5 March 1968

Kosmos 204 (Russian: Космос 204 meaning Cosmos 204), also known as DS-P1-I No.3 was a satellite which was used as a radar target for anti-ballistic missile tests. It was launched by the Soviet Union in 1968 as part of the Dnepropetrovsk Sputnik programme. and had a mass of 400 kilograms (880 lb).

It was launched aboard a Kosmos-2I 63SM rocket, from Site 133/1 at Plesetsk. The launch occurred at 18:28:00 GMT on 5 March 1968.

Kosmos 204 was placed into a low Earth orbit with a perigee of 204 kilometres (127 mi), an apogee of 844 kilometres (524 mi), an inclination of 70.0°, and an orbital period of 95.9 minutes. It decayed from orbit on 2 March 1969.

Kosmos 204 was the third of nineteen DS-P1-I satellites to be launched. Of these, all reached orbit successfully except the seventh, launched out of sequence.

== See also ==
- 1968 in spaceflight
