= Kosmos 211 =

Soviet satellite launched in 1968

- Mission type: ABM radar target
- COSPAR ID: 1968-028A
- SATCAT no.: 03181
- Mission duration: 215 days

Spacecraft properties
- Spacecraft type: DS-P1-Yu
- Manufacturer: Yuzhnoye
- Launch mass: 400 kg

Start of mission
- Launch date: 9 April 1968, 11:26:25 GMT
- Rocket: Kosmos-2I 63SM
- Launch site: Plesetsk Site 133/3
- Contractor: Yuzhnoye

End of mission
- Decay date: 10 November 1968

Orbital parameters
- Reference system: Geocentric
- Regime: Low Earth
- Perigee altitude: 199 km
- Apogee altitude: 1532 km
- Inclination: 81.9°
- Period: 102.5 minutes
- Epoch: 9 April 1968

Kosmos 211 (Russian: Космос 211 meaning Cosmos 211), also known as DS-P1-Yu No.13 was a Soviet satellite which was used as a radar calibration target for tests of anti-ballistic missiles. It was built by the Yuzhnoye Design Bureau, and launched in 1968 as part of the Dnepropetrovsk Sputnik programme. It had a mass of 400 kilograms (880 lb).

A Kosmos-2I 63SM carrier rocket was used to launch Kosmos 211 from Site 133/3 at Plesetsk Cosmodrome. The launch occurred at 11:26:25 GMT on 9 April 1968, and resulted in the successful deployment of Kosmos 211 into a low Earth orbit. Upon reaching orbit, it was assigned its Kosmos designation, and received the International Designator 1968-028A.

Kosmos 211 was operated in an orbit with a perigee of 199 kilometres (124 mi), an apogee of 1,532 kilometres (952 mi), an inclination of 81.9°, and an orbital period of 102.5 minutes. It remained in orbit until it decayed and reentered the atmosphere on 10 November 1968. It was the twelfth of seventy nine DS-P1-Yu satellites to be launched, and the eleventh of seventy two to successfully reach orbit.

== See also ==
- 1968 in spaceflight
