= Kosmos 214 =

- Mission type: Optical imaging reconnaissance
- Operator: GRU
- COSPAR ID: 1968-032A
- SATCAT no.: 03203
- Mission duration: 8 days

Spacecraft properties
- Spacecraft type: Zenit-4
- Manufacturer: OKB-1
- Launch mass: 6300 kg

Start of mission
- Launch date: 18 April 1968, 10:33:00 GMT
- Rocket: Voskhod 11A57 s/n V15001-12
- Launch site: Plesetsk, Site 41/1
- Contractor: OKB-1

End of mission
- Disposal: Recovered
- Landing date: 26 April 1968, 09:36 GMT
- Landing site: Steppe in Kazakhstan

Orbital parameters
- Reference system: Geocentric
- Regime: Low Earth
- Perigee altitude: 200 km
- Apogee altitude: 373 km
- Inclination: 81.4°
- Period: 90.3 minutes
- Epoch: 18 April 1968

Kosmos 214 (Russian: Космос 214 meaning Cosmos 214) or Zenit-4 No.45 was a Soviet, optical film-return reconnaissance satellite launched in 1968. A Zenit-4 satellite, Kosmos 214 was the fortieth of seventy-six such spacecraft to be launched.

== Spacecraft ==
Kosmos 18 was a Zenit-4 satellite, a second generation, high-resolution, reconnaissance satellite derived from the Vostok spacecraft used for crewed flights, the satellites were developed by OKB-1. Kosmos 214 had a mass of 6,300 kilograms (13,900 lb), and carried one camera of 3000 mm focal length as well as a 200 mm camera. The focal length of the main camera was greater than the diameter of the capsule so the camera made use of a mirror to fold the light path. The ground resolution is not publicly known but it is believed to have been 1–2 m.

== Launch ==
Kosmos 214 was launched by the Voskhod 11A57 rocket, serial number V15001-12, flying from Site 41/1 at the Plesetsk Cosmodrome. The launch took place at 10:33:00 GMT on 18 April 1968, and following its successful arrival in orbit the spacecraft received its Kosmos designation, along with the International Designator 1968-032A and the Satellite Catalog Number 03203.

== Mission ==
Kosmos 214 was operated in a low Earth orbit, at an epoch of 18 April 1968, it had a perigee of 200 kilometres (120 mi), an apogee of 373 kilometres (232 mi), an inclination of 81.4°, and an orbital period of 90.3 minutes. After eight days in orbit, Kosmos 214 was deorbited, with its return capsule descending under parachute and landing at 09:36 GMT on 26 April 1968, and recovered by the Soviet forces in the steppe in Kazakhstan.

== See also ==
- 1968 in spaceflight
