= Subsynchronous orbit =

Kind of planetary orbit

A subsynchronous orbit is an orbit of a satellite that is nearer the planet than it would be if it were in synchronous orbit, i.e. the orbital period is less than the sidereal day of the planet.

== Technical considerations ==
An Earth satellite that is in (a prograde) subsynchronous orbit will appear to drift eastward as seen from the Earth's surface.

== Economic importance in commercial spaceflight ==
The Geosynchronous-belt subsynchronous orbital regime is regularly used in spaceflight. This orbit is typically used to house working communication satellites that have not yet been deactivated, and may be still be used again in geostationary service if the need arises.

== See also ==
- Supersynchronous orbit
- List of orbits
