= RADCAT =

RADCAT (RADar CAlibration Target) were a pair of passive radar calibration satellites operated by the United States. They were cylinders with a radar cross section of 5m^{2}. The first was destroyed in a launch failure in 1968; the second was launched in 1972 and remained in orbit until 2012.
