= Fractional orbital bombardment system =

Nuclear weapons delivery system

Fractional orbital bombardment system compared to a traditional ICBM

A fractional orbital bombardment system (FOBS) is a warhead delivery system that uses a low Earth orbit towards its target destination. Just before reaching the target, it deorbits through a retrograde engine burn.

The Soviet Union first developed FOBS as a nuclear-weapons delivery system in the 1960s. It was one of the first Soviet efforts to use space to deliver nuclear weapons. In August 2021, the People's Republic of China tested a weapon that combined a FOBS with a hypersonic glide vehicle.

Like a kinetic bombardment system but with nuclear weapons, FOBS has several attractive qualities: it has no range limit, its flight path would not reveal the target location, and warheads could be directed to North America over the South Pole, evading detection by NORAD's north-facing early warning systems.

The maximum altitude would be around 150 km. (Note: The ISS orbits at 400 km.) Energetically, this would require a launch vehicle powerful enough to be capable of putting the weapon into orbit.

== Development history and deployment ==
=== Lead-up to FOBS development ===
Some Soviet officials began expressing a desire for a FOBS-type weapon around the time of Sputnik's launch. By the early 1960s, the Soviet Union felt that pursuing a system like the FOBS would be a natural next step given its belief that the US was already planning to use space to mount nuclear attacks. The success of the Soviet Vostok program which saw a rocket send a human into orbit and then land at a predesignated location made this kind of weapon seem more feasible.

=== Competing FOBS designs ===
Soviet rocket engineer Sergei Korolev seems to have been responsible for the first FOBS-type missile design. His offering was the GR-1; it was also known as 'Global Missile 1' within Korolev's design bureau, as SS-X-10 Scrag by NATO authorities, and as 11A513 (or 8K73) by Soviet GRAU index. Korolev's research began as early as 1960 and the GR-1 project was sanctioned by Soviet officials on September 24, 1962.

Korolev brought up the idea of the GR-1 to Soviet Premier Nikita Khrushchev in early 1962. Soon after, Khrushchev announced that the Soviet Union was capable of utilizing "global missiles" that could fly over both the North and South Poles on their way to a target, continuing on to say that this type of weapon would render early warning radar systems practically obsolete and leave the enemy with no time to retaliate before the weapon's impact. Korolev's engineers first estimated that NATO radar systems would detect the GR-1's warhead only two minutes before arrival.

The GR-1 was to use the NK-9 and NK-9V as main engines in its first and second stages respectively. Though the NK-9 and NK-9V weren't created by Korolev's team, the GR-1's 8D726 retrorocket engine was. This engine would prove to be instrumental to the progress of Russian rocketry, specifically for its importance in the development of the Blok-D upper stage of rockets like the N1, Proton, and Zenit.

The GR-1 had three stages and a total vehicle mass of 117 tons. It was 35.31 meters long with a 2.68 meter diameter and could carry a single 2.2 megaton yield nuclear warhead. It was cryogenic liquid propelled, utilizing a mix of RG-1 kerosene with liquid oxygen (LOX).

Two other FOBS-type missile projects emerged around the time of the GR-1's early development. It seems that each of these projects were competing with one another for usage selection.

The first of the two other projects was that of Soviet missile engineer Vladimir Chelomey who proposed two designs: one called the UR-200A (GRAU index 8K83) that was derivative of his UR-200 ICBM and another designated as GR-2 which built off of his colossal UR-500 prototype ICBM and had a much larger explosive yield of 30 megatons. The UR-200A design was eventually selected for further development over the GR-2. It was to use the RD-0202 and RD-0205 engines for its first and second stages respectively and be equipped with an AB-200 aeroballistic warhead. Unlike the GR-1, the UR-200 and its derivatives used storable (or hypergolic) liquid propellants; specifically nitrogen tetroxide and UDMH. Chelomey and his engineers received development authorization for the UR-200 ICBM on March 16, 1961, beginning work on the UR-200A variant at some point after.

The second of the two other projects came from the Soviet missile designer Mikhail Yangel. His proposal was the R-36O (8K69 by GRAU index and SS-9 Mod 3 Scarp by NATO report) which was approved for development by Soviet officials on April 16, 1962. Yangel used an ICBM design of his own, the R-36 (NATO designation SS-9 Scarp), as a base for the R-36O. The missile had three stages, using the RD-251 engine in its first stage and the RD-252 engine in its second stage. The weapon's third stage was related to the deorbiting process as well as warhead guidance and delivery; the Soviets referred to this system as OGCh.

An aiming system inside the OGCh would check and rectify trajectory issues in relation to the desired target location through the use of various instruments (for instance, a radio altimeter used in conjunction with an inertial navigation system). The aiming system would make its checks directly after the missile came into orbit and immediately before third stage ignition. Deorbiting would be induced by the missile's retrorocket, the RD-854 engine, causing the warhead to take on a ballistic path towards its target.

The warhead, retrorocket, and guidance system were each contained inside the OGCh module. A series of nozzles on the RD-854 enabled aerial maneuvering of the OGCh. Other nozzles facilitated the separation of the warhead from the rest of the OGCh, allowing it to fall alone on a ballistic path to the target. The R-36O's 8F021 warhead had an explosive yield between 5-20 megatons according to Soviet sources. Western intelligence suggests that the yield was smaller, being somewhere between 1–3.5 megatons. The missile was 32.60 meters long with a 3.00 meter diameter and a total launch mass of 180 tons. The R-36O used the same hypergolic propellants as the UR-200.

=== Yangel design selection ===
In 1965, Soviet military officials worked to select one of the three FOBS projects. The R-36O of Yangel's design bureau was chosen for further development over the others. The reasoning behind the Soviet FOBS design selection process remains somewhat unclear. A particularly confounding factor to consider is that none of the three proposed missiles had undergone a single test flight prior to the R-36O's selection. Even so, there are some explanations as to why Yangel's design was chosen in the end. These revolve around the occurrence of negative events in the competing GR-1 and UR-200A projects that effectively knocked them out of contention.

One strike against Korolev's GR-1 was that it used a cryogenic propellant, thereby rendering the missile a poor candidate for operational storage in a missile silo as the Soviet military desired. Other negative factors include that the GR-1's 8D726 retrorocket was demonstrating a proclivity for failure in its initial tests and, as a cause for yet more worry, the troublesome R-9A, the subject of a different ongoing Korolev ICBM project, was quite similar to the GR-1 in construction. Thus, military leadership was encouraged to look elsewhere for more immediate progress.

The GR-1's ability to deal with US ABM systems and its lengthy fueling process were questioned by Soviet analysts. There were also significant delays associated with the production of the GR-1's NK-9 engine, for which the Kuznetsov bureau was responsible. Under the weight of these issues, the GR-1 project fell apart in January 1965.

Chelomey's UR-200A project lost a great deal of support after Khrushchev, his most important political ally, was ousted in 1964. Military authorities under the Brezhnev administration were far less friendly to Chelomey and quick to deem the R-36O a better choice for further FOBS development. Having lost the ability to tap into the Soviet Premier's influence, Chelomey ultimately failed to secure the survival of the UR-200A, its development coming to an end in 1965.

=== Flight testing and deployment ===
At its missile range near Baikonur, Kazakhstan, the Soviet Union tested and deployed the R-36O. A testing station and a horizontal assembly facility were constructed for the missile's development initially. Over most of 1965, two R-36 test pads were modified to work with the R-36O for its early test flights. In addition, 18 silos capable of launching the R-36O were built over the mid-1960s to 1971; three rounds of construction occurred with six silos being built each time. Those built in the same area were placed 10-15 kilometers away from one another to prevent the possibility of a single nuclear strike destroying multiple silos.

The Soviet Union originally planned nineteen R-36O launches, but 24 were carried out by 1971. The initial four were to begin from a ground-based testing pad and then fly to the Kamchatka Peninsula. The other tests called for the R-36O to be launched from a silo into orbit where it would then execute its third stage deorbit process over the Pacific Ocean; the missile's payload would be retrofired into Soviet territory. Over 2000 Soviet service people participated in the tests. Six of the tests were outright failures while the others achieved either complete or partial success. Prior to the first launches, the Soviet Union stated that a "space vehicle landing system" was being tested over the Pacific.

The first test flight occurred on December 16, 1965. It missed the landing area by a wide margin owing to a stabilization instrument malfunction. The second test was on February 5, 1966, and was also a failure due to a retrorocket issue. The third test took place on March 16, 1966. Nitrogen tetroxide spilled over the surface pad during fueling due to a miscommunication and the missile was quickly destroyed by fire. Some success was had with the fourth test on May 20, 1966, but the payload didn't break away from the missile's guidance system as intended.

The following tests were conducted from silos. The first two tests of the silo phase ended in the intentional destruction (via self-destruct functionality) of the R-36O as a result of the second stage engine accidentally being activated for too long, sending the payload into an unplanned orbit. NATO radar systems picked up on the large mass of resulting debris. In one failed test case, small pieces of the missile rained down on the midwestern United States.

In 1967, the Soviet Union conducted ten more R-36O tests, nine of them seeing some level of success. In that year and beyond, the Soviet Union used public statements about satellite launch tests as cover for any R-36O test that was intended to put its payload into orbit for some period of time.

On November 19, 1968, about a month after the 20th test, the Soviet Union designated the R-36O as operational and began its deployment in three groups of six. By 1971, all 18 of the Soviet Union's R-36O silos were in service in Kazakhstan. NATO intelligence suggests that a primary target was the US Grand Forks Air Force Base where an ABM system was set to be established in the late 1960s to early 1970s. The R-36O wasn't equipped with a nuclear payload until 1972.

== Reasons for development ==
The Soviet Union identified a number of strategic advantages of the FOBS. The following points prompted its development:

- The system granted unlimited striking range with a nuclear weapon.
- The system allowed a strike to be carried out from any direction. For instance, the Soviet Union could launch an attack against the United States using a South Pole or North Pole flight path; technically, it could even execute both of these attack plans simultaneously.
- The system provided a way of evading early warning radar systems. This advantage comes from two different attributes of the FOBS: (1) that it could attack from any direction, as stated above, and (2) that it could travel along a very low Earth orbital path. The first point has to do with the fact that one of the primary missile defense radar systems of the US around the time of the FOBS' early development was the Ballistic Missile Early Warning System (BMEWS). The BMEWS was oriented to detect ballistic missiles coming from the aforementioned 'North Pole route' (its three stations being located in Alaska, Greenland, and the United Kingdom) and therefore wouldn't detect a strike flying along a southern orbital path. The second point considers that FOBS missiles could fly relatively close to the Earth's surface; they could have a perigee of under 100 miles (160 km) and an apogee as low as 125 miles (200 km) above the ground (see apsis). US radar systems like the BMEWS were configured to detect ICBMs that flew several hundred to upwards of 1000 miles (1600 km) above the surface, not low altitude missiles like that of the FOBS. Thus, the Soviet Union felt that striking with a FOBS would deprive the United States of valuable warning time that ICBMs were likely to give away, time that could be used to mount a devastating retaliatory attack.
- The system concealed the target location until the payload was dropped out of orbit. Theoretically, the FOBS was capable of staying in orbit for several orbits, at most, due to the exceptionally low trajectory, but could separate its warhead from the FOBS vehicle at any given point in the orbit.
- The FOBS' flight duration was shorter than that of an ICBM (assuming an indirect route isn't taken for the purpose of radar evasion). A FOBS missile may have been able to reach its target around 10 minutes before an ICBM would.
- The Soviet Union supposed that the FOBS would be capable of trumping US anti-ballistic missile (ABM) systems. This was actually a primary objective of the Soviet FOBS from its origin. On one hand, the FOBS was seen as a tool that could boost the effectiveness of a Soviet ICBM strike by first eliminating some of the enemy's safeguards (like ABM systems). Given the notion that a FOBS missile could not be destroyed by an ABM system, it also follows that the FOBS could be used alone to carry out a nuclear attack. In late 1967, US officials indicated that they could develop ABMs to counter the Soviet FOBS, the implication being that it was indeed capable of besting American ABM systems at that time and beforehand.

== End of deployment and associated reasons ==
There are two main technical disadvantages of the FOBS to consider:

- Its nuclear payload was drastically reduced relative to that of an ICBM due to the high level of energy needed to get the weapon into orbit. According to American intelligence, the FOBS' nuclear warhead mass needed to be roughly 1/2 to 1/3 of that of an ICBM, and required a more robust ablative system, due to the higher entry velocities.
- The FOBS was less accurate than an ICBM. This was empirically demonstrated in the series of Soviet R-36O flight tests that occurred over 1965–1971.

There are a number of other factors to consider that prompted the end of FOBS deployment in the Soviet Union:

- The FOBS wouldn't be able to overcome later early warning radar system developments made by the US, especially those that came in the form of space-based radar deployments. The US established missile detection systems of this type by the early 1970s. The FOBS was made to counter relatively simple ground-based systems like the BMEWS, not the more expansive radar network that followed it. The Soviet FOBS thus had lost one of its primary capabilities only several years into its deployment, a FOBS strike no longer having an adequate probability of going undetected by the US.
- An additional primary use of the Soviet FOBS—its ability to counter an American ABM system—was found out to be needless as time passed. Contrary to earlier Soviet projections, the US never built a large ABM system intended to fend off a Soviet ICBM attack. The only significant American ABM system constructed was Safeguard (initially called Sentinel), but it was shut down by 1976 and mainly China-oriented anyway; it would have been practically useless in the face of anything beyond a limited Soviet nuclear attack regardless of the FOBS.
- Soviet SLBM technology grew into a good replacement for the FOBS on the basis of low flight time, high range (via the submarine's ability to move near its target), and the element of surprise.
- The FOBS potentially acted as a dangerous accelerant to the Cold War arms race for the reason that it was most useful in the context of a pre-emptive nuclear strike. A nation observing their enemy developing the FOBS could logically conclude that they viewed a first strike as a viable nuclear strategy; the observing nation may react to this realization by ramping up its own weapon production and perhaps adopting a first strike nuclear strategy as well.

The Soviet Union began decommissioning and dismantling the FOBS deployment in 1982 (officially in January 1983). The R36-O missile was completely removed from service by February 1983. Starting in May 1984, the Soviet Union razed its FOBS-capable silos. There's confusion over whether all 18 silos were destroyed. One source suggests that six silos were instead modified for the purpose of ICBM modernization testing, as per a SALT II agreement (see Outer Space Treaty and SALT II).

== Outer Space Treaty and SALT II ==
Article IV of the Outer Space Treaty of 1967 stated that:

Parties to the Treaty undertake not to place in orbit around the Earth any objects carrying nuclear weapons or any other kinds of weapons of mass destruction, install such weapons on celestial bodies, or station such weapons in outer space in any other manner.

The overriding opinion of US administrators was that the Soviet FOBS did not violate the treaty, mostly for the reason that the system didn't go into a full orbit. For instance, US Secretary of Defense Robert McNamara argued that the Soviet Union had only agreed "not to place [nuclear] warheads in orbit," continuing on to point out that the FOBS executes its mission on a "fractional orbit, not a full orbit." Senator Henry M. Jackson, chairman of the Joint Atomic Energy Subcommittee on Military Applications, countered that the Soviet FOBS was at least a "good faith violation of the treaty," alluding to the notion that the weapon could go into technical orbit.

This is certainly true: the only thing stopping the Soviet FOBS' payload from completing a full revolution around the Earth (and thereby literally going orbital and violating the treaty) was the firing of the system's retrorocket. Even so, McNamara also drew attention to the fact that the treaty did not ban any form of weapons testing—not even the testing of an orbital nuclear weapons system. None of the Soviet Union's test R-36Os were ever equipped with a nuclear warhead; so, even if it were the case that the launches went orbital, they still would not have broken the treaty.

Unlike the Outer Space Treaty, the SALT II agreement of 1979 explicitly prohibited the pursuance and deployment of the FOBS:

Each Party undertakes not to develop, test, or deploy:

(...)

(c) systems for placing into Earth orbit nuclear weapons or any other kind of weapons of mass destruction, including fractional orbital missiles;

The SALT II agreement was never ratified by the United States Senate. The Soviet Union ultimately complied with its terms anyway, decommissioning its FOBS in 1983 (see the 'End of deployment and associated reasons' section). The agreement also stipulated that 12 of the 18 Soviet FOBS launchers in Kazakhstan were to be taken apart or demolished and never replaced. This was meant to happen within an eight-month period following the treaty's ratification. The terms allowed the USSR to modify the six remaining launchers to fit missile modernization testing purposes.

== American view ==
The US considered creating orbital bombardment weapons in the early 1960s, but concluded in 1963 that they offered few advantages over the ICBM. So when the United States Central Intelligence Agency (CIA) began in 1962 to suspect that the Soviet Union would develop a FOBS-like system, they concluded that Moscow sought the weapon for "propaganda or political reasons", not any militarily significant capacity.

The Soviet Union's R-36O test launches in 1966 and 1967 persuaded the CIA that Moscow was more serious about the military applications (though even through October 1968, around a month before the R-36O was declared operational by the USSR, it remained unclear to the CIA whether the tests they had observed involved a FOBS or a "depressed trajectory" ICBM).

At a news conference on November 3, 1967, Defense Secretary McNamara announced that the Soviet Union might be creating a FOBS. This was the first time that the FOBS project had been explicitly referred to in public (though Khrushchev alluded to this kind of weapon in the early 1960s). McNamara emphasized that the potential Soviet FOBS did not worry him in consideration of its disadvantages compared to the ICBM. At a subsequent congressional hearing, John S. Foster Jr., Director of Defense Research and Engineering, said that the US had since 1963 been developing "over-the-horizon" radar networks that could give about 30 minutes' warning of a FOBS strike, and that such funding would continue.

The United States' view that the FOBS was not particularly useful militarily may explain why the Soviet FOBS was defended by McNamara and others as legal under the 1967 Outer Space Treaty. US officials may not have been willing to see the treaty break down over a single issue like the FOBS, especially given that they had already evaluated it as a minor threat in the grand scheme of that period's nuclear weapon landscape.

== China ==
In 2021, United States Secretary of the Air Force Frank Kendall III said that the People's Liberation Army (PLA) was developing and testing a FOBS.

China reportedly tested a FOBS missile system in July and August 2021. A rocket was launched into orbital flight and re-entered the atmosphere deploying a glide vehicle that traveled at hypersonic speeds. It is claimed that the warhead missed its unidentified target by roughly twenty-four miles.

On October 10th, 2021, China's Foreign Ministry Spokesperson Zhao Lijian claimed that the test launch was not a missile test, and instead was the test of a reusable spaceplane. In November 2022, The United States Department of Defense refuted the previous claims from China's foreign Ministry, and stated that the vehicle had travelled approximately 40,000 km during the test flight with a total flight time of over 100 minutes. The report additionally claimed that the vehicle had completed a revolution around the entire world and had impacted a site inside of China.

== Russia ==
Russia is developing the RS-28 Sarmat ICBM to replace older silo-based Soviet ICBMs. According to Russia, the RS-28 has a range of over 35,000 km (22,000 mi) using a sub-orbital trajectory; this may refer to a FOB trajectory that approaches the United States by way of the southern polar region.

== See also ==
- China and weapons of mass destruction
- Timeline of Russian innovation
