= Kosmos 238 =

Soyuz test spacecraft

Kosmos 238 (Russian: Космос 238 meaning Cosmos 238) was the final test series of the Soviet Soyuz spacecraft prior to the launch of Soyuz 2. It tested the orbital maneuvering system, reentry, descent and landing systems that had been modified and improved after the Soyuz 1 accident.

== Mission parameters ==
- Spacecraft: Soyuz 7K-OK
- Mass: 6520 kg
- Crew: None
- Launched: 28 August 1968, 10:04:00 GMT
- Landed: 1 September 1968, 09:03:00 GMT
- Perigee: 194 km
- Apogee: 313 km
- Inclination: 51.7°
- Period: 88.5 minutes
- NSSDC ID: 1968-072A
