= Kosmos (rocket family) =

Soviet and Russian family of space launch vehicles

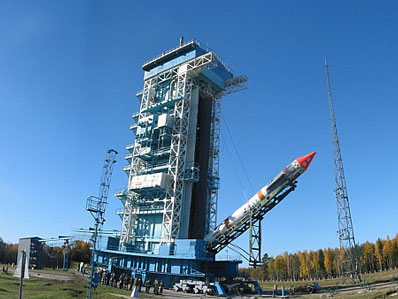
Kosmos-3M on the pad

The Kosmos (also spelled Cosmos, Russian: Ко́смос) rockets were a series of Soviet and subsequently Russian rockets, derived from the R-12 and R-14 missiles, the best known of which is the Kosmos-3M, which has made over 440 launches. The Kosmos family contained a number of rockets, both carrier rockets and sounding rockets, for orbital and sub-orbital spaceflight respectively. The first variant, the Kosmos, first flew on 27 October 1961. Over 700 Kosmos rockets have been launched overall.

== Variants ==
=== Based on the R-12 ===
==== Kosmos ====
Kosmos (GRAU Index: 63S1, also known as Cosmos), was the name of a Soviet space rocket model active between 1961 and 1967. Kosmos was developed from the R-12 medium-range missile. It was launched a total of 38 times, with twelve failures.

==== Kosmos-2M ====
The Kosmos-2M (GRAU Index: 63S1M, also known as Cosmos-2M) rocket was the prototype preceding the Kosmos-2I rocket. It launched the Kosmos 106 and Kosmos 97 satellites, from Area 86 at Kapustin Yar.

==== Kosmos-2I ====
Kosmos-2I (GRAU Index: 11K63, also known as Cosmos-2I or Kosmos-2), derived from the R-12 missile, was used to orbit satellites between 1961 and 1977. It was superseded by the R-14 derived Kosmos-3 and Kosmos-3M.

=== Based on the R-14 ===
==== Kosmos-1 ====
The Kosmos-1 (GRAU Index: 65S3, also known as Cosmos-1) was derived from the R-14 missile and used between 1964 and 1965, being quickly replaced by the Kosmos-3. Eight Kosmos-1 were flown, all launched from Site 41/15 at the Baikonur Cosmodrome.

Initial development was authorised in October 1961, leading to a maiden flight on 18 August 1964, carrying three Strela satellites. Strela-1 satellites were flown on seven flights, three on each of the first four and five on the next three. The eighth and final flight carried one. All flights were successful except the second.

==== Kosmos-3 ====
Kosmos-3
- Function: Carrier rocket
- Manufacturer: Krasnoyarsk Machine-Building Plant
- Country of origin: Soviet Union

Size
- Height: 26.3 metres (86 ft)
- Diameter: 2.4 metres (7.9 ft)
- Mass: 107,500 kilograms (237,000 lb)
- Stages: 2

Capacity

Payload to LEO
- Mass: 1,400 kilograms (3,100 lb)

Launch history
- Status: Retired
- Launch sites: Site 41/15, Baikonur
- Total launches: 4 (+2 suborbital)
- Success(es): 2 (+2 suborbital)
- Failure: 2
- First flight: 16 November 1966
- Last flight: 27 August 1968

First stage – R-14
- Powered by: 1 RD-216
- Maximum thrust: 1,740 kilonewtons (390,000 lbf)
- Specific impulse: 292 sec
- Burn time: 130 seconds
- Propellant: HNO_{3}/UDMH

Second stage – S3
- Powered by: 1 11D49
- Maximum thrust: 156 kilonewtons (35,000 lbf)
- Specific impulse: 303 sec
- Burn time: 375 seconds
- Propellant: HNO_{3}/UDMH

The Kosmos-3 (GRAU Index: 11K65, also known as Cosmos-3), derived from the R-14 missile, was used to orbit satellites between 1966 and 1968, being quickly replaced by the modernised Kosmos-3M. Six were flown, four as orbital carrier rockets, and two on sub-orbital flights. All launches occurred from Site 41/15 at the Baikonur Cosmodrome.

The Kosmos-3 made its maiden flight on 16 November 1966, carrying a Strela-2 satellite. Strela-2 satellites were flown on four flights, two of which failed. Two further, sub-orbital launches were conducted with VKZ payloads, both of which were successful.

Date/time (GMT)	Payload	Trajectory	Outcome	Remarks
16 November 1966, 13:00	Strela-2	LEO (planned)	Failure	Cause of failure unknown
24 March 1967, 11:50	Kosmos 151 (Strela-2)	LEO	Success	
12 October 1967, 14:15	VKZ	Suborbital	Success	Apogee: 4,400 kilometres (2,700 mi)
28 March 1968	VKZ	Suborbital	Success	Apogee: 4,000 kilometres (2,500 mi)
15 June 1968	Strela-2	LEO (planned)	Failure	Cause of failure unknown
27 August 1968, 11:29	Kosmos 236 (Strela-2)	LEO	Success	

==== Kosmos-3M ====
The Kosmos-3M was a liquid-fueled two-stage launch vehicle, first launched in 1967 and with over 420 successful launches to its name. The Kosmos-3M used UDMH fuel and AK27I oxidizer (red fuming nitric acid) to lift roughly 1,400 kg (3,100 lb) of payload into orbit. It differed from the earlier Kosmos-3 in its finer control of the second-stage burn, allowing operators to tune the thrust and even channel it through nozzles that helped orient the rocket for the launching of multiple satellites at one time. PO Polyot manufactured these launch vehicles in the Russian city of Omsk for decades. It was originally scheduled to be retired from service in 2011; however, in April 2010 the Commander of the Russian Space Forces confirmed that it would be retired by the end of 2010. One further launch, with Kanopus-ST, was planned; however, this was cancelled in late 2012 as the launch vehicle had exceeded its design life while in storage ahead of the launch.

==== Kosmos-3MR ====
The Kosmos-3MR rocket (GRAU Index: K65M-R and K65M-RB, also known as Cosmos-3MR), was an adaptation of the Kosmos-3M rocket intended for suborbital and a single orbital launch for BOR-4 and BOR-5 subscale tests of Spiral and Buran crewed spaceplanes.

== See also ==
- R-7 family
