= Kosmos 29 =

Soviet reconnaissance satellite (Zenit 2-17)

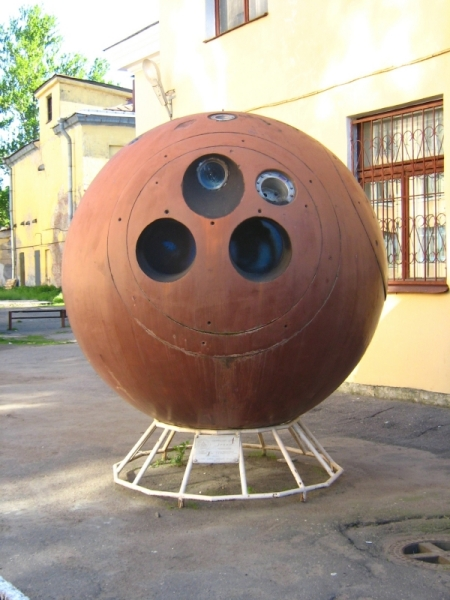
- A Zenit reentry capsule
- Names: Zenit 2-17
- Mission type: Optical imaging reconnaissance
- Operator: OKB-1
- COSPAR ID: 1964-021A
- SATCAT no.: 791
- Mission duration: 8 days

Spacecraft properties
- Spacecraft type: Zenit-2
- Manufacturer: OKB-1
- Launch mass: 4780 kg

Start of mission
- Launch date: 25 April 1964, 10:19:00 GMT
- Rocket: Vostok-2
- Launch site: Baikonur 31/6
- Contractor: OKB-1

End of mission
- Disposal: Recovered
- Landing date: 3 May 1964

Orbital parameters
- Reference system: Geocentric
- Regime: Low Earth
- Perigee altitude: 203 km
- Apogee altitude: 296 km
- Inclination: 65.1°
- Period: 89.5 minutes
- Epoch: 25 April 1964

Kosmos 29 (Russian: Космос 29 meaning Cosmos 29) or Zenit-2 No.17 was a first generation Soviet optical film-return reconnaissance satellite which was launched in 1964. A Zenit-2 spacecraft, Kosmos 29 was the seventeenth of eighty-one such satellites to be launched and had a mass of 4,780 kilograms (10,540 lb).

A Vostok-2 rocket, serial number R15001-01, was used to launch Kosmos 29. The launch took place at 10:19 GMT on 25 April 1964, using Site 31/6 at the Baikonur Cosmodrome. Following its successful arrival in orbit the spacecraft received its Kosmos designation, along with the International Designator 1964-021A and the Satellite Catalog Number 00791.

Kosmos 29 was operated in a low Earth orbit. On 25 April 1964, it had a perigee of 203 kilometres (126 mi), an apogee of 296 kilometres (184 mi), with inclination of 65.1° and an orbital period of 89.5 minutes. After eight days in orbit, the satellite was deorbited on 3 May 1964 with its return capsule descending by parachute for recovery by Soviet forces.
