= Kosmos 99 =

Soviet reconnaissance satellite (Zenit 2-32)

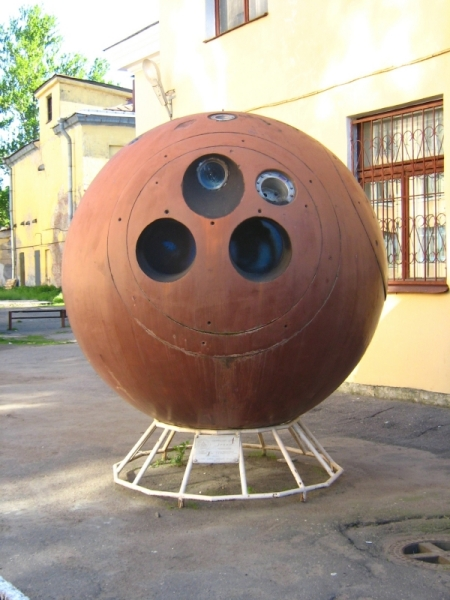
- A Zenit reentry capsule
- Names: Zenit 2-32
- Mission type: Optical imaging reconnaissance
- Operator: OKB-1
- COSPAR ID: 1965-103A
- SATCAT no.: 1817
- Mission duration: 8 days

Spacecraft properties
- Spacecraft type: Zenit-2
- Manufacturer: OKB-1
- Launch mass: 4730 kg

Start of mission
- Launch date: 10 December 1965; 08:09:00 GMT
- Rocket: Vostok-2
- Launch site: Baikonur 31/6

End of mission
- Disposal: Recovered
- Landing date: 18 December 1965

Orbital parameters
- Reference system: Geocentric
- Regime: Low Earth
- Perigee altitude: 203 km
- Apogee altitude: 309 km
- Inclination: 65.0°
- Period: 89.6 minutes
- Epoch: 10 December 1965

Kosmos 99 (Russian: Космос 99 meaning Cosmos 99) or Zenit-2 No.32 was a Soviet, first generation, low resolution, optical film-return reconnaissance satellite launched in 1965. A Zenit-2 spacecraft, Kosmos 99 was the thirty-second of eighty-one such satellites to be launched and had a mass of 4,730 kilograms (10,430 lb).

Kosmos 99 was launched by a Vostok-2 rocket, serial number U15001-04, flying from Site 31/6 at the Baikonur Cosmodrome. The launch took place at 08:09 GMT on 10 December 1965. Following its successful arrival in orbit the spacecraft received its Kosmos designation; along with the International Designator 1965-103A and the Satellite Catalog Number 01817.

Kosmos 99 was operated in a low Earth orbit, at an epoch of 10 December 1965, it had a perigee of 203 kilometres (126 mi), an apogee of 309 kilometres (192 mi), an inclination of 65.0° and an orbital period of 89.6 minutes. On 18 December 1965, after eight days in orbit, the satellite was deorbited with its return capsule descending by parachute for recovery by the Soviet force.
