= Kosmos 143 =

- Mission type: Optical imaging reconnaissance
- Operator: OKB-1
- COSPAR ID: 1967-017A
- SATCAT no.: 02693
- Mission duration: 8 days

Spacecraft properties
- Spacecraft type: Zenit-2
- Manufacturer: OKB-1
- Launch mass: 1730 kg

Start of mission
- Launch date: 27 February 1967; 08:45:01 GMT
- Rocket: Vostok-2 s/n U15001-03
- Launch site: Baikonur, Site 1/5
- Contractor: OKB-1

End of mission
- Disposal: Recovered
- Landing date: 7 March 1967, 05:46 GMT
- Landing site: Steppe of Kazakhstan

Orbital parameters
- Reference system: Geocentric
- Regime: Low Earth
- Perigee altitude: 204 km
- Apogee altitude: 297 km
- Inclination: 65.0°
- Period: 89.5 minutes
- Epoch: 27 February 1967

Kosmos 143 (Russian: Космос 143 meaning Cosmos 143) or Zenit-2 No.45 was a Soviet, first generation, low resolution, optical film-return reconnaissance satellite launched in 1967. A Zenit-2 spacecraft, Kosmos 143 was the forty-sixth of eighty-one such satellites to be launched and had a mass of 1,730 kilograms (3,810 lb).

Kosmos 143 was launched by a Vostok-2 rocket, serial number U15001-03, flying from Site 1/5 at the Baikonur Cosmodrome. The launch took place at 08:45:01 GMT on 27 February 1967, and following its arrival in orbit the spacecraft received its Kosmos designation; along with the International Designator 1967-017A and the Satellite Catalog Number 02693. A minor anomaly during launch resulted in the satellite's orbit being slightly lower than had been planned, with its orbital period being 22.8 seconds shorter than the target orbit. Despite this the satellite performed its mission successfully. The satellite also carried a science package.

Kosmos 143 was operated in a low Earth orbit, at an epoch of 27 February 1967, it had a perigee of 204 kilometres (127 mi), an apogee of 297 kilometres (185 mi), an inclination of 65.0°, and an orbital period of 89.5 minutes. After eight days in orbit, Kosmos 143 was deorbited, with its return capsule descending under parachute, landing at 05:46 GMT on 7 March 1967, and recovered by Soviet force.
