= Kosmos 117 =

Soviet optical film-return reconnaissance satellite

- Mission type: Optical imaging reconnaissance
- Operator: OKB-1
- COSPAR ID: 1966-037A
- SATCAT no.: 02163
- Mission duration: 8 days

Spacecraft properties
- Spacecraft type: Zenit-2
- Manufacturer: OKB-1
- Launch mass: 4730 kg

Start of mission
- Launch date: 6 May 1966, 11:02:00 GMT
- Rocket: Vostok-2 s/n N15001-01
- Launch site: Baikonur, Site 31/6
- Contractor: OKB-1

End of mission
- Disposal: Recovered
- Landing date: 14 May 1966, 08:24 GMT

Orbital parameters
- Reference system: Geocentric
- Regime: Low Earth
- Perigee altitude: 205 km
- Apogee altitude: 298 km
- Inclination: 65.0°
- Period: 89.5 minutes
- Epoch: 6 May 1966

Kosmos 117 (Russian: Космос 117 meaning Cosmos 117) or Zenit-2 No.39 was a Soviet optical film-return reconnaissance satellite launched in 1966. A Zenit-2 spacecraft, Kosmos 117 was the thirty-eighth of eighty-one such satellites to be launched and had a mass of 4,730 kilograms (10,430 lb).

Kosmos 117 was launched by a Vostok-2 rocket, serial number N15001-01, flying from Site 31/6 at the Baikonur Cosmodrome. The launch took place at 11:02 GMT on 6 May 1966, and following its successful arrival in orbit the spacecraft received its Kosmos designation; along with the International Designator 1966-037A and the Satellite Catalog Number 02163.

Kosmos 117 was operated in a low Earth orbit, at an epoch of 6 May 1966, it had a perigee of 205 kilometres (127 mi), an apogee of 298 kilometres (185 mi), an inclination of 65.0°, and an orbital period of 89.5 minutes. After eight days in orbit, Kosmos 117 was deorbited, with its return capsule descending under parachute and landing at 08:24 GMT on 14 May 1966 and recovered by Soviet force.
