= Kosmos 32 =

Soviet reconnaissance satellite (Zenit 2-18)

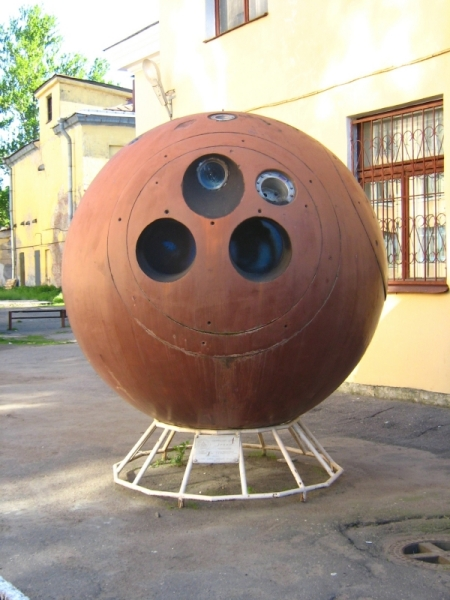
- A Zenit reentry capsule
- Names: Zenit 2-18
- Mission type: Optical imaging reconnaissance
- Operator: OKB-1
- COSPAR ID: 1964-029A
- SATCAT no.: 807
- Mission duration: 8 days

Spacecraft properties
- Spacecraft type: Zenit-2
- Manufacturer: OKB-1
- Launch mass: 4730 kg

Start of mission
- Launch date: 10 June 1964, 10:48:00 GMT
- Rocket: Vostok-2
- Launch site: Baikonur 31/6
- Contractor: OKB-1

End of mission
- Disposal: Recovered
- Landing date: 18 June 1964

Orbital parameters
- Reference system: Geocentric
- Regime: Low Earth
- Perigee altitude: 213 km
- Apogee altitude: 319 km
- Inclination: 51.3°
- Period: 89.8 minutes
- Epoch: 10 June 1964

Kosmos 32 (Russian: Космос 32 meaning Cosmos 32) or Zenit-2 No.18 was a Soviet, first generation, low resolution, optical film-return reconnaissance satellite which was launched in 1964. A Zenit-2 spacecraft, Kosmos 32 was the eighteenth of eighty-one such satellites to be launched and had a mass of 4,730 kilograms (10,430 lb).

The launch of Kosmos 32 took place at 10:48 GMT on 10 June 1964. A Vostok-2 rocket, serial number R15001-02, was used to place the satellite into orbit, with Site 31/6 at the Baikonur Cosmodrome being used for the launch. Following its successful insertion into orbit the satellite received its Kosmos designation, along with the International Designator 1964-029A and the Satellite Catalog Number 00807.

Kosmos 32 was operated in a low Earth orbit. On 10 June 1964, it had a perigee of 213 kilometres (132 mi), an apogee of 319 kilometres (198 mi) and inclination of 51.3°, with an orbital period of 89.8 minutes. After eight days in orbit, Kosmos 32 was deorbited on 18 June 1964 with its return capsule descending by parachute for recovery by Soviet forces.
