= Kosmos 78 =

Soviet reconnaissance satellite (Zenit 2-30)

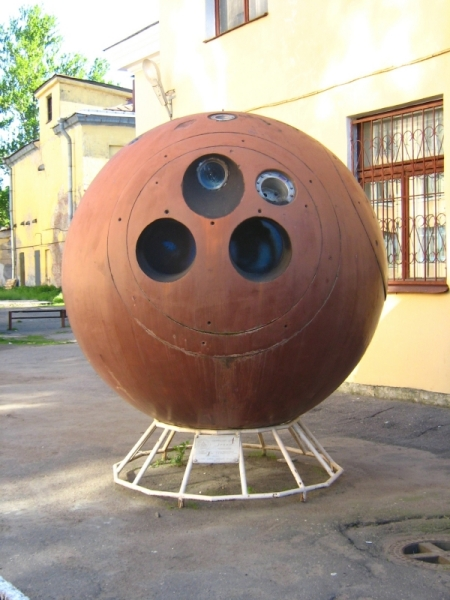
- A Zenit reentry capsule
- Names: Zenit 2-30
- Mission type: Optical imaging reconnaissance
- Operator: OKB-1
- COSPAR ID: 1965-066A
- SATCAT no.: 1505
- Mission duration: 8 days

Spacecraft properties
- Spacecraft type: Zenit-2
- Manufacturer: OKB-1
- Launch mass: 4730 kg

Start of mission
- Launch date: 14 August 1965; 10:56:46 GMT
- Rocket: Vostok-2
- Launch site: Baikonur 31/6
- Contractor: OKB-1

End of mission
- Disposal: Recovered
- Landing date: 22 August 1965

Orbital parameters
- Reference system: Geocentric
- Regime: Low Earth
- Perigee altitude: 218 km
- Apogee altitude: 298 km
- Inclination: 69.0°
- Period: 89.9 minutes
- Epoch: 14 August 1965

Kosmos 78 (Russian: Космос 78, romanized: Cosmos 78) or Zenit-2 No.30 was a Soviet, first generation, low resolution, optical film-return reconnaissance satellite launched in 1965. A Zenit-2 spacecraft, Kosmos 78 was the thirtieth of eighty-one such satellites to be launched and had a mass of 4,730 kilograms (10,430 lb).

Kosmos 78 was launched by a Vostok-2 rocket, serial number U15001-02, flying from Site 31/6 at the Baikonur Cosmodrome. The launch took place at 11:17 GMT on 14 August 1965, and following its successful arrival in orbit the spacecraft received its Kosmos designation; along with the International Designator 1965-066A and the Satellite Catalog Number 01505.

Kosmos 78 was operated in a low Earth orbit; at an epoch of 14 August 1965, it had a perigee of 218 kilometres (135 mi), an apogee of 298 kilometres (185 mi), an inclination of 69.0° and an orbital period of 89.9 minutes. On 22 August 1965, after eight days of operation the satellite was deorbited, with its return capsule descending by parachute for recovery by Soviet force.
