= Kosmos 120 =

Satellite

- Mission type: Optical imaging reconnaissance
- Operator: OKB-1
- COSPAR ID: 1966-050A
- SATCAT no.: 02196
- Mission duration: 8 days

Spacecraft properties
- Spacecraft type: Zenit-2
- Manufacturer: OKB-1
- Launch mass: 4730 kg

Start of mission
- Launch date: 8 June 1966, 11:02:00 GMT
- Rocket: Voskhod 11A57 s/n N15001-13
- Launch site: Baikonur, Site 31/6
- Contractor: OKB-1

End of mission
- Disposal: Recovered
- Landing date: 16 June 1966, 09:36 GMT

Orbital parameters
- Reference system: Geocentric
- Regime: Low Earth
- Perigee altitude: 205 km
- Apogee altitude: 285 km
- Inclination: 51.8°
- Period: 89.4 minutes
- Epoch: 8 June 1966

Kosmos 120 (Russian: Космос 120 meaning Cosmos 120) or Zenit-2 No.41 was a Soviet, first generation, low resolution, optical film-return reconnaissance satellite launched in 1966. A Zenit-2 spacecraft, Kosmos 120 was the thirty-ninth of eighty-one such satellites to be launched and had a mass of 4,730 kilograms (10,430 lb).

Kosmos 120 was launched by a Voskhod 11A57 serial number N15001-13 carrier rocket, flying from Site 31/6 at the Baikonur Cosmodrome. The launch took place at 11:02 GMT on 8 June 1966, and following its successful arrival in orbit the spacecraft received its Kosmos designation; along with the International Designator 1966-050A and the Satellite Catalog Number 02196. This was the first time a Voskhod had been used to launch a Zenit-2 satellite; previous launches had used Vostok-2 rockets while the Voskhod was typically used to launch Zenit-4 spacecraft.

Kosmos 120 was operated in a low Earth orbit, at an epoch of 8 June 1966, it had a perigee of 205 kilometres (127 mi), an apogee of 285 kilometres (177 mi), an inclination of 51.8° and an orbital period of 89.4 minutes. After eight days in orbit, Kosmos 120 was deorbited, with its return capsule descending under parachute, landing at 09:36 GMT on 16 June 1966, and recovered by Soviet force.
