= Kosmos 105 =

Soviet reconnaissance satellite (Zenit 2-34)

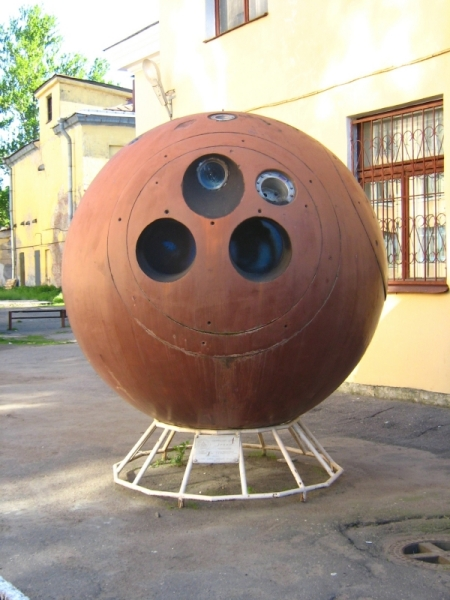
- A Zenit reentry capsule
- Names: Zenit 2-34
- Mission type: Optical imaging reconnaissance
- Operator: OKB-1
- COSPAR ID: 1966-003A
- SATCAT no.: 1945
- Mission duration: 8 days

Spacecraft properties
- Spacecraft type: Zenit-2
- Manufacturer: OKB-1
- Launch mass: 4730 kg

Start of mission
- Launch date: 22 January 1966; 08:38:00 GMT
- Rocket: Vostok-2
- Launch site: Baikonur 31/6
- Contractor: OKB-1

End of mission
- Disposal: Recovered
- Landing date: 30 January 1966

Orbital parameters
- Reference system: Geocentric
- Regime: Low Earth
- Perigee altitude: 204 km
- Apogee altitude: 310 km
- Inclination: 65.0°
- Period: 89.7 minutes
- Epoch: 22 January 1966

Kosmos 105 (Russian: Космос 105 meaning Cosmos 105) or Zenit-2 No.34 was a Soviet, first generation, low resolution, optical film-return reconnaissance satellite launched in 1966. A Zenit-2 spacecraft, Kosmos 105 was the thirty-fourth of eighty-one such satellites to be launched and had a mass of 4,730 kilograms (10,430 lb).

Kosmos 105 was launched by a Vostok-2 rocket flying from Site 31/6 at the Baikonur Cosmodrome. The launch took place at 08:38 GMT on 22 January 1966, and following its successful arrival in orbit the spacecraft received its Kosmos designation, along with the International Designator 1966-003A and the Satellite Catalog Number 01945.

Kosmos 105 was operated in a low Earth orbit; at an epoch of 22 January 1966 it had a perigee of 204 kilometres (127 mi), an apogee of 310 kilometres (190 mi), an inclination of 65.0° and an orbital period of 89.7 minutes. On 30 January 1966, after eight days in orbit, the satellite was deorbited with its return capsule descending by parachute for recovery by Soviet force.
