= Kosmos 18 =

Soviet reconnaissance satellite (Zenit 2-11)

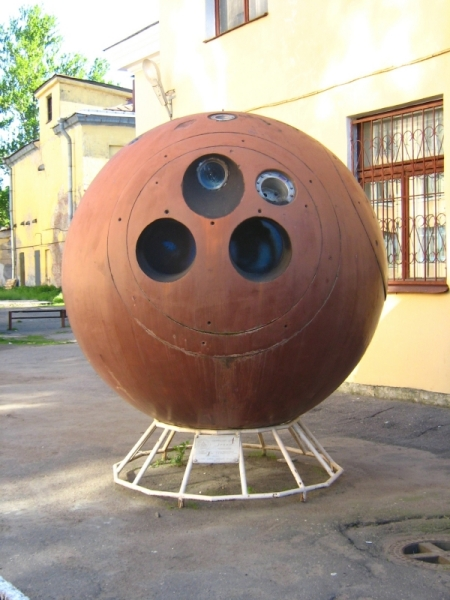
- A Zenit reentry capsule
- Names: Zenit 2-11
- Mission type: Optical imaging reconnaissance Radiation
- COSPAR ID: 1963-018A
- SATCAT no.: 586
- Mission duration: 9 days

Spacecraft properties
- Spacecraft type: Zenit-2
- Manufacturer: OKB-1
- Launch mass: 4730 kg

Start of mission
- Launch date: 24 May 1963, 10:48:00 GMT
- Rocket: Vostok-2
- Launch site: Baikonur 1/5
- Contractor: OKB-1

End of mission
- Disposal: Recovered
- Landing date: 2 June 1963
- Landing site: Steppe in Kazakhstan

Orbital parameters
- Reference system: Geocentric
- Regime: Low Earth
- Perigee altitude: 196 km
- Apogee altitude: 288 km
- Inclination: 65.0°
- Period: 89.4 minutes
- Epoch: 24 May 1963

Kosmos 18 (Russian: Космос 18 meaning Cosmos 18) or Zenit-2 No.11 was a Soviet optical film-return reconnaissance satellite launched in 1963. A Zenit-2 satellite, Kosmos 18 was the eleventh of eighty-one such spacecraft to be launched.

== Spacecraft ==
Kosmos 18 was a Zenit-2 satellite, a first generation, low resolution, reconnaissance satellite derived from the Vostok spacecraft used for crewed flights, the satellites were developed by OKB-1. In addition to reconnaissance, it was also used for research into radiation in support of the Vostok programme. It had a mass of 4,730 kilograms (10,430 lb).

== Launch ==
The Vostok-2 rocket, serial number E15000-12, was used to launch Kosmos 18. The launch took place at 10:48:00 GMT on 24 May 1963, using Site 1/5 at the Baikonur Cosmodrome. Following its successful arrival in orbit the spacecraft received its Kosmos designation, along with the International Designator 1963-018A and the Satellite Catalog Number 00586.

== Mission ==
Kosmos 18 was operated in a low Earth orbit. On 24 May 1963, it had a perigee of 196 kilometres (122 mi), an apogee of 288 kilometres (179 mi), with an inclination of 65.0°, and an orbital period of 89.4 minutes. Having spent nine days in orbit, the spacecraft was deorbited on 2 June 1963. Its return capsule descended under parachute and was recovered by the Soviet forces in the steppe in Kazakhstan. In addition to its imaging mission, Kosmos 18 was used to conduct measurements of radiation levels in low Earth orbit.

== See also ==
- 1963 in spaceflight
