= Kosmos 107 =

Soviet reconnaissance satellite (Zenit 2-35)

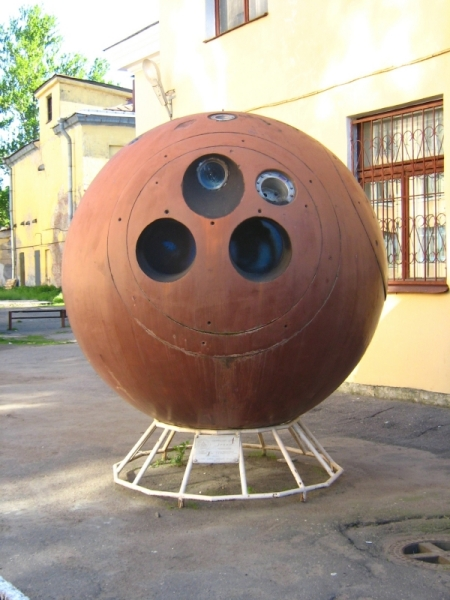
- A Zenit reentry capsule
- Names: Zenit 2-35
- Mission type: Optical imaging
- Operator: OKB-1
- COSPAR ID: 1966-010A
- SATCAT no.: 1998
- Mission duration: 7 days, 21 hours and 37 minutes

Spacecraft properties
- Spacecraft type: Zenit-2
- Manufacturer: OKB-1
- Launch mass: 4730 kg

Start of mission
- Launch date: 10 February 1966, 08:52:00 GMT
- Rocket: Vostok-2
- Launch site: Baikonur 31/6
- Contractor: OKB-1

End of mission
- Disposal: Recovered
- Landing date: 18 February 1966, 06:29 GMT

Orbital parameters
- Reference system: Geocentric
- Regime: Low Earth
- Perigee altitude: 204 km
- Apogee altitude: 310 km
- Inclination: 65.0°
- Period: 89.7 minutes
- Epoch: 10 February 1966

Kosmos 107 (Russian: Космос 107 meaning Cosmos 107) or Zenit-2 No.35 was a Soviet, first generation, low resolution, optical film-return reconnaissance satellite launched in 1966. A Zenit-2 spacecraft, Kosmos 107 was the thirty-fifth of eighty-one such satellites to be launched and had a mass of 4,730 kilograms (10,430 lb).

Kosmos 107 was launched by a Vostok-2 rocket flying from Site 31/6 at the Baikonur Cosmodrome. The launch took place at 08:52 GMT on 10 February 1966, and following its successful arrival in orbit the spacecraft received its Kosmos designation; along with the International Designator 1966-010A and the Satellite Catalog Number 01998.

Kosmos 107 was operated in a low Earth orbit, at an epoch of 10 February 1966, it had a perigee of 204 kilometres (127 mi), an apogee of 310 kilometres (190 mi), an inclination of 65.0° and an orbital period of 89.7 minutes. After eight days in orbit, Kosmos 107 was deorbited, with its return capsule descending under parachute, landing at 06:29 GMT on 18 February 1966, and recovered by Soviet force.
