= Kosmos 129 =

Soviet reconnaissance satellite

- Mission type: Optical imaging reconnaissance
- Operator: OKB-1
- COSPAR ID: 1966-091A
- SATCAT no.: 02491
- Mission duration: 7 days

Spacecraft properties
- Spacecraft type: Zenit-2
- Manufacturer: OKB-1
- Launch mass: 4730 kg

Start of mission
- Launch date: 14 October 1966; 12:14:00 GMT
- Rocket: Vostok-2 s/n U1500-05
- Launch site: Plesetsk, Site 41/1
- Contractor: OKB-1

End of mission
- Disposal: Recovered
- Landing date: 21 October 1966, 06:14 GMT

Orbital parameters
- Reference system: Geocentric
- Regime: Low Earth
- Perigee altitude: 180 km
- Apogee altitude: 312 km
- Inclination: 65.0°
- Period: 89.4 minutes
- Epoch: 14 October 1966

Kosmos 129 (Russian: Космос 129 meaning Cosmos 129) or Zenit-2 No.33 was a Soviet, first generation, low resolution, optical film-return reconnaissance satellite launched in 1966. A Zenit-2 spacecraft, Kosmos 129 was the forty-second of eighty-one such satellites to be launched and had a mass of 4,730 kilograms (10,430 lb).

Kosmos 129 was launched by a Vostok-2 rocket, serial number U1500-05, flying from Site 41/1 at the Plesetsk Cosmodrome. The launch took place at 12:14 GMT on 14 October 1966, and following its successful arrival in orbit the spacecraft received its Kosmos designation; along with the International Designator 1966-091A and the Satellite Catalog Number 02491.

Kosmos 129 was operated in a low Earth orbit, at an epoch of 14 October 1966, it had a perigee of 180 kilometres (110 mi), an apogee of 312 kilometres (194 mi), an inclination of 65.0°, and an orbital period of 89.4 minutes. After seven days in orbit, Kosmos 129 was deorbited, with its return capsule descending under parachute, landing at 06:14 GMT on 21 October 1966, and recovered by Soviet force.
