= Kosmos 46 =

Soviet reconnaissance satellite (Zenit 2-22)

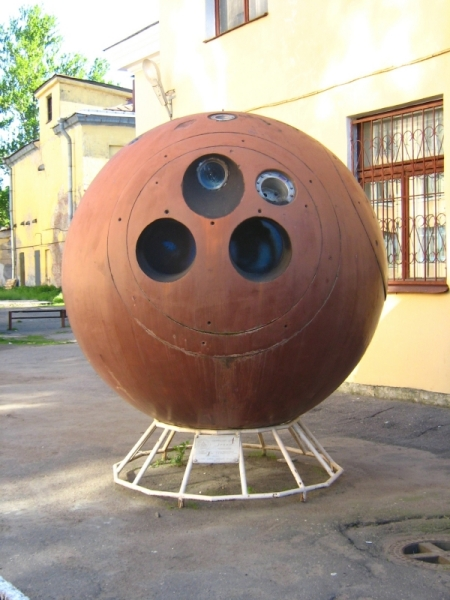
- A Zenit reentry capsule
- Names: Zenit 2-22
- Mission type: Optical imaging reconnaissance
- Operator: OKB-1
- COSPAR ID: 1964-059A
- SATCAT no.: 885
- Mission duration: 8 days

Spacecraft properties
- Spacecraft type: Zenit-2
- Manufacturer: OKB-1
- Launch mass: 4730 kg

Start of mission
- Launch date: 24 September 1964; 12:00:00 GMT
- Rocket: Vostok-2
- Launch site: Baikonur 31/6
- Contractor: OKB-1

End of mission
- Disposal: Recovered
- Landing date: 2 October 1964

Orbital parameters
- Reference system: Geocentric
- Regime: Low Earth
- Perigee altitude: 211 km
- Apogee altitude: 264 km
- Inclination: 51.3°
- Period: 89.2 minutes
- Epoch: 24 September 1964

Kosmos 46 (Russian: Космос 46 meaning Cosmos 46) or Zenit-2 No.22 was a Soviet, first generation, low resolution, optical film-return reconnaissance satellite launched in 1964. A Zenit-2 spacecraft, Kosmos 46 was the twenty-second of eighty one such satellites to be launched and had a mass of 4,730 kilograms (10,430 lb).

Kosmos 46 was launched by a Vostok-2 rocket, serial number R15001-05, flying from Site 31/6 at the Baikonur Cosmodrome. The launch took place at 12:00 GMT on 24 September 1964, and following its successful arrival in orbit the spacecraft received its Kosmos designation; along with the International Designator 1964-059A and the Satellite Catalog Number 00885.

Kosmos 46 was operated in a low Earth orbit, on 24 September 1964, it had a perigee of 211 kilometres (131 mi), an apogee of 264 kilometres (164 mi), inclination of 51.3° and an orbital period of 89.2 minutes. On 2 October 1964, after eight days in orbit, the satellite was deorbited with its return capsule descending by parachute for recovery by Soviet forces.

== See also ==
- 1964 in spaceflight
