= Kosmos 13 =

Soviet reconnaissance satellite (Zenit 2-8)

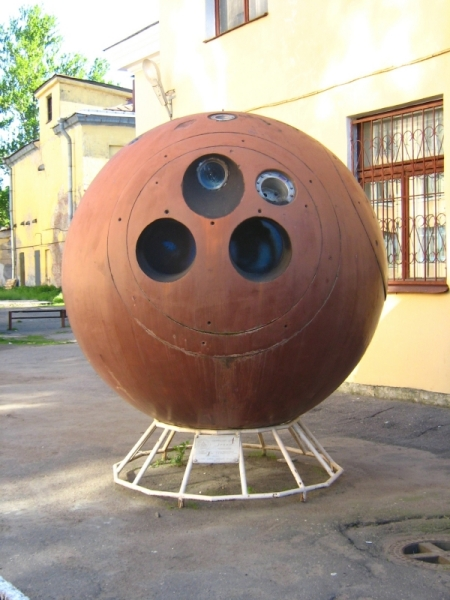
- A Zenit reentry capsule
- Names: Zenit 2-8
- Mission type: Optical imaging reconnaissance Radiation
- Operator: Soviet space program
- COSPAR ID: 1963-006A
- SATCAT no.: 554
- Mission duration: 8 days

Spacecraft properties
- Spacecraft type: Zenit-2
- Manufacturer: OKB-1
- Launch mass: 4730 kg

Start of mission
- Launch date: 21 March 1963, 08:24:00 GMT
- Rocket: Vostok-2
- Launch site: Baikonur 1/5
- Contractor: OKB-1

End of mission
- Disposal: Recovered
- Landing date: 29 March 1963
- Landing site: Steppe in Kazakhstan

Orbital parameters
- Reference system: Geocentric
- Regime: Low Earth
- Perigee altitude: 192 km
- Apogee altitude: 324km
- Inclination: 65.0°
- Period: 89.8 minutes
- Epoch: 21 March 1963

Kosmos 13 (Russian: Космос 13 meaning Cosmos 13) or Zenit-2 No.8 was a Soviet optical film-return reconnaissance satellite launched in 1963. A Zenit-2 spacecraft, Kosmos 13 was the eighth of eighty-one such satellites to be launched.

== Spacecraft ==
Kosmos 13 was a Zenit-2 satellite, a first generation, low resolution, reconnaissance satellite derived from the Vostok spacecraft used for crewed flights, the satellites were developed by OKB-1. In addition to reconnaissance, it was also used for research into radiation in support of the Vostok programme. It had a mass of 4,730 kilograms (10,430 lb).

== Mission ==
The Vostok-2 rocket, serial number T15000-01, was used to launch Kosmos 13. The launch took place from Site 1/5 at the Baikonur Cosmodrome at 08:24:00 GMT on 21 March 1963. Following its successful arrival in orbit the spacecraft received its Kosmos designation, along with the International Designator 1963-006A and the Satellite Catalog Number 00554.

Kosmos 13 was operated in a low Earth orbit. On 23 March 1963 it had a perigee of 192 kilometres (119 mi), an apogee of 324 kilometres (201 mi), with an inclination of 65.0°, and an orbital period of 89.8 minutes. After eight days in orbit, the spacecraft was deorbited on 29 March 1963, with its return capsule descending by parachute for recovery by the Soviet forces in the steppe in Kazakhstan. In addition to its reconnaissance payload, Kosmos 13 also carried an experiment to measure radiation levels in its environment.

== See also ==
- 1963 in spaceflight
