= Kosmos 52 =

Soviet reconnaissance satellite (Zenit 2-25)

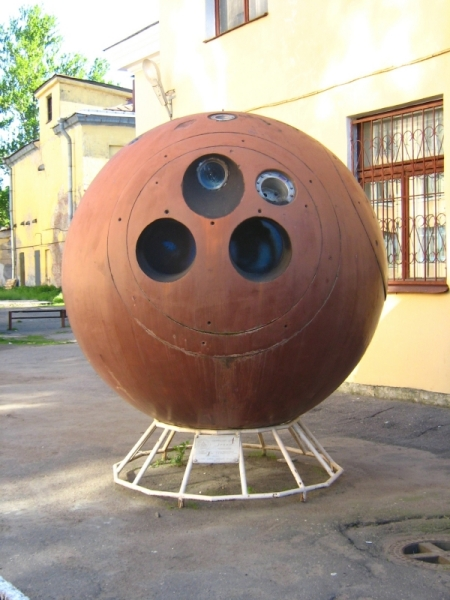
- A Zenit reentry capsule
- Names: Zenit 2-25
- Mission type: Optical imaging reconnaissance
- Operator: OKB-1
- COSPAR ID: 1965-001A
- SATCAT no.: 968
- Mission duration: 8 days

Spacecraft properties
- Spacecraft type: Zenit-2
- Manufacturer: OKB-1
- Launch mass: 4730 kg

Start of mission
- Launch date: 11 January 1965; 09:36:00 GMT
- Rocket: Vostok-2
- Launch site: Baikonur 31/6
- Contractor: OKB-1

End of mission
- Disposal: Recovered
- Landing date: 19 January 1965

Orbital parameters
- Reference system: Geocentric
- Regime: Low Earth
- Perigee altitude: 203 km
- Apogee altitude: 298 km
- Inclination: 65.0°
- Period: 89.5 minutes
- Epoch: 11 January 1965

Kosmos 52 (Russian: Космос 52 meaning Cosmos 52) or Zenit-2 No.25 was a Soviet, first generation, low resolution, optical film-return reconnaissance satellite launched in 1965. A Zenit-2 spacecraft, Kosmos 52 was the twenty-fifth of eighty-one such satellites to be launched and had a mass of 4,730 kilograms (10,430 lb).

Kosmos 52 was launched by a Vostok-2 rocket, serial number R15002-03, flying from Site 31/6 at the Baikonur Cosmodrome. The launch took place at 09:36 GMT on 11 January 1965, with the spacecraft receiving its Kosmos designation - along with the International Designator 1965-001A and the Satellite Catalog Number 00968 - upon its successful insertion into orbit. It was the first satellite to be launched in the year 1965.

Kosmos 52 was operated in a low Earth orbit. On 11 January 1965 it had a perigee of 203 kilometres (126 mi), an apogee of 298 kilometres (185 mi), an inclination of 65.0° and an orbital period of 89.5 minutes. On 19 January 1965, eight days after launch, Kosmos 52 was deorbited so that its return capsule could be recovered by Soviet forces and its photos developed and analysed.
