= Kosmos 50 =

Soviet reconnaissance satellite (Zenit 2-24)

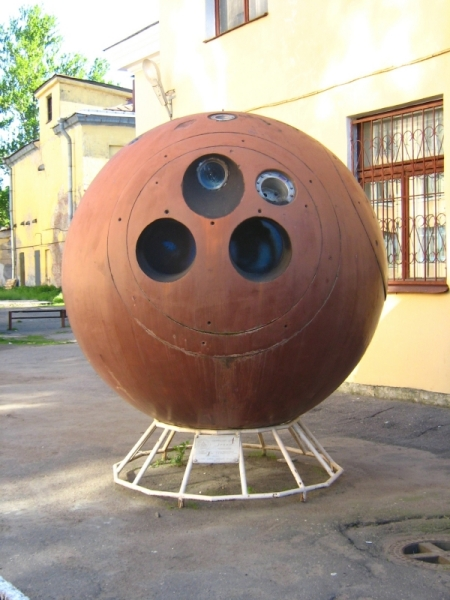
- A Zenit reentry capsule
- Names: Zenit 2-24
- Mission type: Optical imaging reconnaissance
- Operator: OKB-1
- COSPAR ID: 1964-070A
- SATCAT no.: 919
- Mission duration: 8 days

Spacecraft properties
- Spacecraft type: Zenit-2
- Manufacturer: OKB-1
- Launch mass: 4730 kg

Start of mission
- Launch date: 28 October 1964; 10:48:00 GMT
- Rocket: Vostok-2
- Launch site: Baikonur 31/6
- Contractor: OKB-1

End of mission
- Disposal: Self-destructed
- Destroyed: 5 November 1964
- Decay date: 8–17 November 1964

Orbital parameters
- Reference system: Geocentric
- Regime: Low Earth
- Perigee altitude: 190 km
- Apogee altitude: 230 km
- Inclination: 51.3°
- Period: 88.7 minutes
- Epoch: 28 October 1964

Kosmos 50 (Russian: Космос 50 meaning Cosmos 50) or Zenit-2 No.24 was a Soviet, first generation, low resolution, optical film-return reconnaissance satellite launched in 1964. A Zenit-2 spacecraft, Kosmos 50 was the twenty-fourth of eighty-one such satellites to be launched and had a mass of 4,730 kilograms (10,430 lb).

Kosmos 50 was launched by a Vostok-2 rocket, serial number R15002-02, flying from Site 31/6 at the Baikonur Cosmodrome. The launch took place at 10:48 GMT on 28 October 1964, and following its successful arrival in orbit the spacecraft received its Kosmos designation; along with the International Designator 1964-070A and the Satellite Catalog Number 00919.

Kosmos 50 was operated in a low Earth orbit, it had a perigee of 190 kilometres (120 mi), an apogee of 230 kilometres (140 mi), an inclination of 51.3° and an orbital period of 88.7 minutes. On 5 November 1964, after eight days in orbit, an attempt was made to deorbit the satellite so that its photographs could be developed and analysed. After its retrorockets failed to fire, the satellite was commanded to self-destruct to ensure it could not fall into enemy hands. Ninety-five pieces of debris were catalogued, which decayed from orbit between 8 and 17 November.
