= Kosmos 28 =

Soviet reconnaissance satellite (Zenit 2-16)

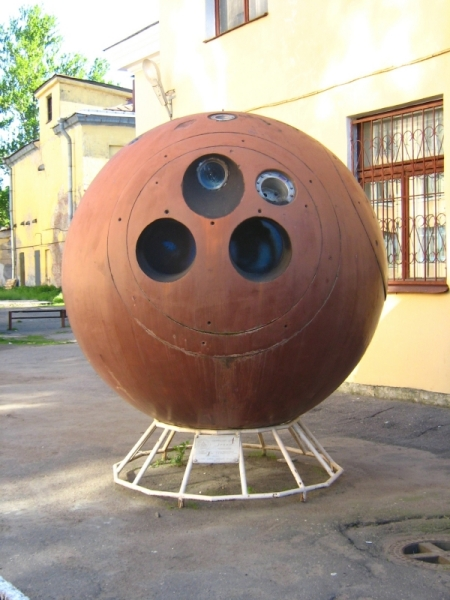
- A Zenit reentry capsule
- Names: Zenit 2-16
- Mission type: Optical imaging reconnaissance
- Operator: Soviet space program
- COSPAR ID: 1964-017A
- SATCAT no.: 779
- Mission duration: 8 days

Spacecraft properties
- Spacecraft type: Zenit-2
- Manufacturer: OKB-1
- Launch mass: 4730 kg

Start of mission
- Launch date: 4 April 1964, 09:36:00 GMT
- Rocket: Vostok-2
- Launch site: Baikonur 31/6
- Contractor: OKB-1

End of mission
- Disposal: Recovered
- Landing date: 12 April 1964

Orbital parameters
- Reference system: Geocentric
- Regime: Low Earth
- Perigee altitude: 213 km
- Apogee altitude: 373 km
- Inclination: 65.0°
- Period: 90.4 minutes
- Epoch: 4 April 1964

Kosmos 28 (Russian: Космос 28 meaning Cosmos 28) or Zenit-2 No.16 was a Soviet, a first generation, low resolution, optical film-return reconnaissance satellite which was launched in 1964. A Zenit-2 spacecraft, Kosmos 28 was the sixteenth of eighty-one such satellites to be launched and had a mass of 4,730 kilograms (10,430 lb).

A Vostok-2 rocket, s/n G15001-04, was used to launch Kosmos 28. The launch took place at 09:36 GMT on 4 April 1964 from Site 31/6 at the Baikonur Cosmodrome. Following its successful arrival in orbit the spacecraft received its Kosmos designation, along with the International Designator 1964-017A and the Satellite Catalog Number 00779.

Kosmos 28 was operated in a low Earth orbit. On 4 April 1964, it had a perigee of 213 kilometres (132 mi), an apogee of 373 kilometres (232 mi), with inclination of 65.0° and an orbital period of 90.4 minutes. On 12 April 1964, the spacecraft was deorbited, with its return capsule descending by parachute for recovery by Soviet forces.
