= Kosmos 136 =

- Mission type: Optical imaging reconnaissance
- Operator: OKB-1
- COSPAR ID: 1966-115A
- SATCAT no.: 02624
- Mission duration: 8 days

Spacecraft properties
- Spacecraft type: Zenit-2
- Manufacturer: OKB-1
- Launch mass: 4730 kg

Start of mission
- Launch date: 19 December 1966; 12:00:01 GMT
- Rocket: Vostok-2 s/n N15001-09
- Launch site: Plesetsk, Site 41/1
- Contractor: OKB-1

End of mission
- Disposal: Recovered
- Landing date: 27 December 1966; 06:00 GMT

Orbital parameters
- Reference system: Geocentric
- Regime: Low Earth
- Perigee altitude: 188 km
- Apogee altitude: 280 km
- Inclination: 64.6°
- Period: 89.4 minutes
- Epoch: 19 December 1966

Kosmos 136 (Russian: Космос 136 meaning Cosmos 136) or Zenit-2 No.47 was a Soviet, first generation, low resolution, optical film-return reconnaissance satellite launched in 1966. A Zenit-2 spacecraft, Kosmos 136 was the forty-fourth of eighty-one such satellites to be launched and had a mass of 4,730 kilograms (10,430 lb). In addition to its reconnaissance mission, the satellite was also used for scientific research.

Kosmos 136 was launched by a Vostok-2 rocket, serial number N15001-09, flying from Site 41/1 at the Plesetsk Cosmodrome. The launch took place at 12:00:01 GMT on 19 December 1966, and following its successful arrival in orbit the spacecraft received its Kosmos designation; along with the International Designator 1966-115A and the Satellite Catalog Number 02624.

Kosmos 136 was operated in a low Earth orbit, at an epoch of 19 December 1966, it had a perigee of 188 kilometres (117 mi), an apogee of 280 kilometres (170 mi), an inclination of 64.6°, and an orbital period of 89.4 minutes. After eight days in orbit, Kosmos 136 was deorbited, with its return capsule descending under parachute, landing at 06:00 GMT on 27 December 1966, and recovered by Soviet force.
