= Kosmos 24 =

Soviet reconnaissance satellite (Zenit 2-15)

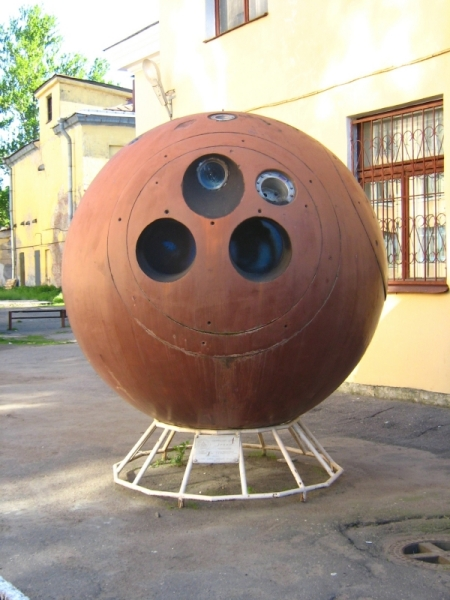
- A Zenit reentry capsule
- Names: Zenit 2-15
- Mission type: Optical imaging reconnaissance
- Operator: Soviet space program
- COSPAR ID: 1963-052A
- SATCAT no.: 712
- Mission duration: 9 days

Spacecraft properties
- Spacecraft type: Zenit-2
- Manufacturer: OKB-1
- Launch mass: 4730 kg

Start of mission
- Launch date: 19 December 1963; 09:21:00 GMT
- Rocket: Vostok-2
- Launch site: Baikonur 1/5
- Contractor: OKB-1

End of mission
- Disposal: Recovered
- Landing date: 28 December 1963

Orbital parameters
- Reference system: Geocentric
- Regime: Low Earth
- Perigee altitude: 204 km
- Apogee altitude: 391 km
- Inclination: 65.0°
- Period: 90.5 minutes
- Epoch: 19 December 1963

Kosmos 24 (Russian: Космос 24 meaning Cosmos 24) or Zenit-2 No.15 was a Soviet optical film-return reconnaissance satellite. It was a first generation, low resolution spacecraft. A Zenit-2 satellite, Kosmos 24 was the fifteenth of eighty-one such spacecraft to be launched and had a mass of 4,730 kilograms (10,430 lb).

A Vostok-2 rocket, serial number G15001-03, was used to launch Kosmos 24. The launch took place at 09:28:58 UTC on 19 December 1963, from Site 1/5 at the Baikonur Cosmodrome. Following its successful arrival in orbit the spacecraft received its Kosmos designation, along with the International Designator 1963-052A and the Satellite Catalog Number 00712.

Kosmos 24 was operated in a low Earth orbit. On 19 December 1963, it had a perigee of 204 kilometres (127 mi), an apogee of 391 kilometres (243 mi), with inclination of 65.0° and an orbital period of 90.5 minutes. Having spent nine days in orbit, the spacecraft was deorbited on 28 December 1963. Its return capsule descended under parachute for recovery by Soviet forces.
