= Kosmos 35 =

Soviet reconnaissance satellite (Zenit 2-20)

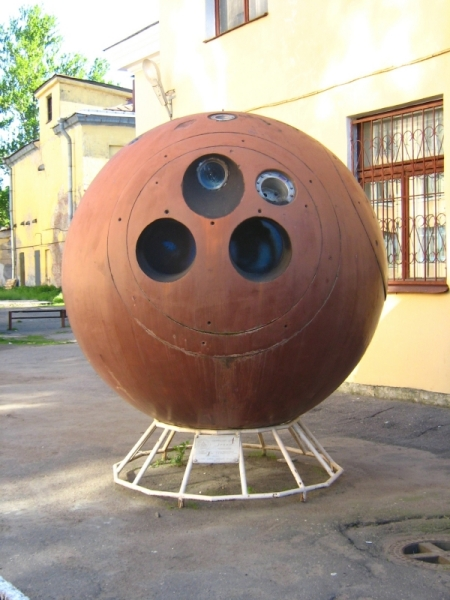
- A Zenit reentry capsule
- Names: Zenit 2-20
- Mission type: Optical imaging reconnaissance
- Operator: OKB-1
- COSPAR ID: 1964-039A
- SATCAT no.: 833
- Mission duration: 8 days

Spacecraft properties
- Spacecraft type: Zenit-2
- Manufacturer: OKB-1
- Launch mass: 4730 kg

Start of mission
- Launch date: 15 July 1964, 11:31:00 GMT
- Rocket: Vostok-2
- Launch site: Baikonur 31/6
- Contractor: OKB-1

End of mission
- Disposal: Recovered
- Landing date: 23 July 1964

Orbital parameters
- Reference system: Geocentric
- Regime: Low Earth
- Perigee altitude: 218 km
- Apogee altitude: 258 km
- Inclination: 51.3°
- Period: 89.2 minutes
- Epoch: 15 July 1964

Kosmos 35 (Russian: Космос 35 meaning Cosmos 35) or Zenit-2 No.20 was a Soviet, first generation, low resolution, optical film-return reconnaissance satellite launched in 1964. A Zenit-2 spacecraft, Kosmos 35 was the twentieth of eighty-one such satellites to be launched and had a mass of 4,730 kilograms (10,430 lb).

Kosmos 35 was launched by a Vostok-2 rocket, serial number R15001-03, flying from Site 31/6 at the Baikonur Cosmodrome. The launch took place at 11:31 GMT on 15 July 1964, and following its successful arrival in orbit the spacecraft received its Kosmos designation; along with the International Designator 1964-039A and the Satellite Catalog Number 00833.

Kosmos 35 was operated in a low Earth orbit, it had a perigee of 218 kilometres (135 mi), an apogee of 258 kilometres (160 mi), inclination of 51.3° and an orbital period of 89.2 minutes. On 23 July 1964, after eight days in orbit, the satellite was deorbited with its return capsule descending by parachute for recovery by Soviet forces.
