= Kosmos 68 =

Soviet reconnaissance satellite (Zenit 2-28)

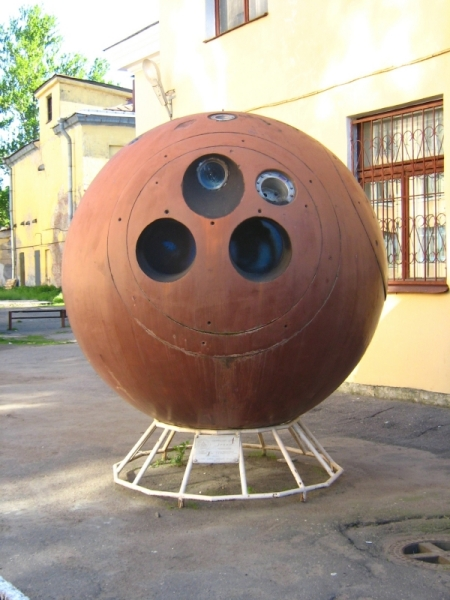
- A Zenit reentry capsule
- Names: Zenit 2-28
- Mission type: Optical imaging reconnaissance
- Operator: OKB-1
- COSPAR ID: 1965-046A
- SATCAT no.: 1404
- Mission duration: 8 days

Spacecraft properties
- Spacecraft type: Zenit-2
- Manufacturer: OKB-1
- Launch mass: 4730 kg

Start of mission
- Launch date: 15 June 1965, 10:04:00 GMT
- Rocket: Vostok-2
- Launch site: Baikonur 31/6
- Contractor: OKB-1

End of mission
- Disposal: Recovered
- Landing date: 23 June 1965

Orbital parameters
- Reference system: Geocentric
- Regime: Low Earth
- Perigee altitude: 209 km
- Apogee altitude: 315 km
- Inclination: 65.0°
- Period: 89.8 minutes
- Epoch: 15 June 1965

Kosmos 68 (Russian: Космос 68 meaning Cosmos 68) or Zenit-2 No.28 was a Soviet, first generation, low resolution, optical film-return reconnaissance satellite launched in 1965. A Zenit-2 spacecraft, Kosmos 68 was the twenty-eighth of eighty-one such satellites to be launched and had a mass of 4,730 kilograms (10,430 lb).

Kosmos 68 was launched by a Vostok-2 rocket, serial number U15001-01, flying from Site 31/6 at the Baikonur Cosmodrome. The launch took place at 10:04 GMT on 15 June 1965, and following its successful arrival in orbit the spacecraft received its Kosmos designation; along with the International Designator 1965-046A and the Satellite Catalog Number 01404.

Kosmos 68 was operated in a low Earth orbit; at an epoch of 17 June 1965 it had a perigee of 209 kilometres (130 mi), an apogee of 315 kilometres (196 mi), an inclination of 65.0° and an orbital period of 89.8 minutes. On 23 June 1965, after eight days in orbit, the satellite was deorbited with its return capsule descending by parachute for recovery by Soviet forces.
