= Kosmos 104 =

Soviet reconnaissance satellite (Zenit 2-33)

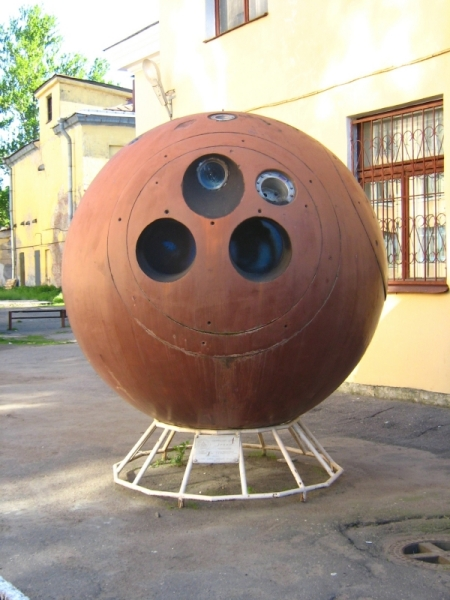
- A Zenit reentry capsule
- Names: Zenit 2-33
- Mission type: Optical imaging reconnaissance
- Operator: OKB-1
- COSPAR ID: 1966-001A
- SATCAT no.: 1903
- Mission duration: 8 days

Spacecraft properties
- Spacecraft type: Zenit-2
- Manufacturer: OKB-1
- Launch mass: 4730 kg

Start of mission
- Launch date: 7 January 1966; 08:24:00 GMT
- Rocket: Vostok-2
- Launch site: Baikonur 31/6
- Contractor: OKB-1

End of mission
- Disposal: Recovered
- Landing date: 15 January 1966

Orbital parameters
- Reference system: Geocentric
- Regime: Low Earth
- Perigee altitude: 193 km
- Apogee altitude: 380 km
- Inclination: 65.0°
- Period: 90.2 minutes
- Epoch: 7 January 1966

Kosmos 104 (Космос 104 meaning Cosmos 104) or Zenit-2 No.33 was a Soviet first-generation low-resolution optical film–return reconnaissance satellite launched in 1966. A Zenit-2 spacecraft, Kosmos 104 was the thirty-second of eighty-one such satellites to be launched and had a mass of 4,730 kilograms (10,430 lb).

Kosmos 104 was launched by a Vostok-2 rocket from Site 31/6 at the Baikonur Cosmodrome. The launch took place at 08:24 GMT on 7 January 1966; however, the program was not completely met. The spacecraft was put into an incorrect orbit by malfunctions in the booster rocket's second and third stages. The spacecraft received a Kosmos designation, along with the International Designator 1966-001A and the Satellite Catalog Number 01903.

Despite the problem during its launch, Kosmos 104 was able to complete most of its imaging mission. Its orbit, at an epoch of 7 January 1966, had a perigee of 193 kilometres (120 mi), an apogee of 380 kilometres (240 mi) inclination of 65.0° and a period of 90.2 minutes. On 15 January 1966, after eight days in orbit, the satellite was deorbited with its return capsule descending by parachute for a successful recovery by Soviet force.
