= Kosmos 98 =

Soviet reconnaissance satellite (Zenit 2-31)

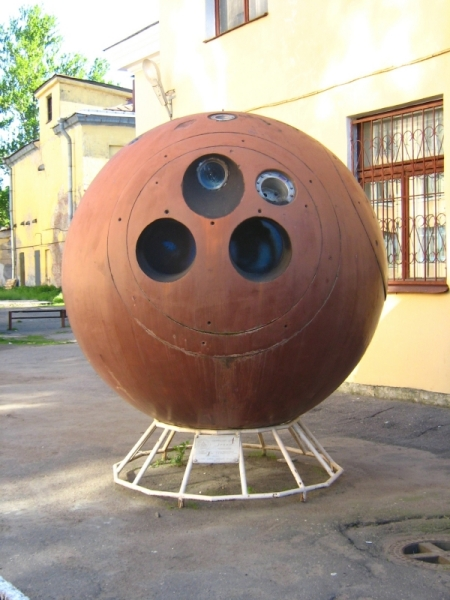
- A Zenit reentry capsule
- Names: Zenit 2-31
- Mission type: Optical imaging reconnaissance
- Operator: OKB-1
- COSPAR ID: 1965-097A
- SATCAT no.: 1780
- Mission duration: 8 days

Spacecraft properties
- Spacecraft type: Zenit-2
- Manufacturer: OKB-1
- Launch mass: 4730 kg

Start of mission
- Launch date: 27 November 1965; 08:24:00 GMT
- Rocket: Vostok-2
- Launch site: Baikonur 31/6

End of mission
- Disposal: Recovered
- Landing date: 5 December 1965

Orbital parameters
- Reference system: Geocentric
- Regime: Low Earth
- Perigee altitude: 205 km
- Apogee altitude: 547 km
- Inclination: 65.0°
- Period: 92.0 minutes
- Epoch: 27 November 1965

Kosmos 98 (Russian: Космос 98 meaning Cosmos 98) or Zenit-2 No.31 was a Soviet, first generation, low resolution, optical film-return reconnaissance satellite launched in 1965. A Zenit-2 spacecraft, Kosmos 98 was the thirty-first of eighty-one such satellites to be launched and had a mass of 4,730 kilograms (10,430 lb).

Kosmos 98 was launched by a Vostok-2 rocket, serial number U15001-05, flying from Site 31/6 at the Baikonur Cosmodrome. The launch took place at 08:24 GMT on 27 November 1965 and following the satellite's successful arrival in orbit it received its Kosmos designation, along with the International Designator 1965-097A and the Satellite Catalog Number 01780.

Kosmos 98 was operated in a low Earth orbit, at an epoch of 27 November 1965, it had a perigee of 205 kilometres (127 mi), an apogee of 547 kilometres (340 mi), an inclination of 65.0° and an orbital period of 92.0 minutes. On 5 December 1965, after eight days in orbit, the satellite was deorbited with its return capsule descending by parachute for recovery by the Soviet Force.
