= Kosmos 112 =

Soviet reconnaissance satellite (Zenit 2-36)

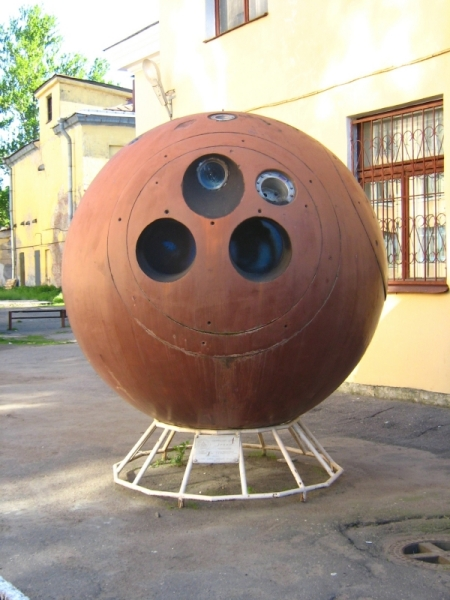
- A Zenit reentry capsule
- Names: Zenit 2-36
- Mission type: Optical imaging reconnaissance
- Operator: OKB-1
- COSPAR ID: 1966-021A
- SATCAT no.: 2107
- Mission duration: 7 days, 19 hours and 3 minutes

Spacecraft properties
- Spacecraft type: Zenit-2
- Manufacturer: OKB-1
- Launch mass: 4730 kg

Start of mission
- Launch date: 17 March 1966, 10:28:00 GMT
- Rocket: Vostok-2
- Launch site: Plesetsk 41/1
- Contractor: OKB-1

End of mission
- Disposal: Recovered
- Landing date: 25 March 1966, 05:31 GMT

Orbital parameters
- Reference system: Geocentric
- Regime: Low Earth
- Perigee altitude: 207 km
- Apogee altitude: 545 km
- Inclination: 72.0°
- Period: 92.1 minutes
- Epoch: 17 March 1966

Kosmos 112 (Russian: Космос 112 meaning Cosmos 112) or Zenit-2 No.36 was a Soviet, first generation, low resolution, optical film-return reconnaissance satellite launched in 1966. A Zenit-2 spacecraft, Kosmos 112 was the thirty-sixth of eighty-one such satellites to be launched and had a mass of 4,730 kilograms (10,430 lb). It was the first satellite to be launched from the Plesetsk Cosmodrome.

Kosmos 112 was launched by a Vostok-2 rocket, serial number U15001-09, flying from Site 41/1 at Plesetsk. The launch took place at 10:28 GMT on 17 March 1966, and following its successful arrival in orbit the spacecraft received its Kosmos designation; along with the International Designator 1966-021A and the Satellite Catalog Number 02107.

Kosmos 112 was operated in a low Earth orbit, at an epoch of 17 March 1966, it had a perigee of 207 kilometres (129 mi), an apogee of 545 kilometres (339 mi), an inclination of 72.0° and an orbital period of 92.1 minutes. After eight days in orbit, Kosmos 112 was deorbited, with its return capsule descending under parachute and landing at 05:31 GMT on 25 March 1966 et recovered by Soviet force.
