= Kosmos 147 =

Soviet film-return reconnaissance satellite

- Mission type: Optical imaging reconnaissance
- Operator: OKB-1
- COSPAR ID: 1967-022A
- SATCAT no.: 02710
- Mission duration: 8 days

Spacecraft properties
- Spacecraft type: Zenit-2
- Manufacturer: OKB-1
- Launch mass: 4000 kg

Start of mission
- Launch date: 13 March 1967, 12:10:23 GMT
- Rocket: Vostok-2 s/n N15001-06
- Launch site: Plesetsk, Site 41/1
- Contractor: OKB-1

End of mission
- Disposal: Recovered
- Landing date: 21 March 1967, 06:29 GMT
- Landing site: Steppe du Kazakhstan

Orbital parameters
- Reference system: Geocentric
- Regime: Low Earth
- Perigee altitude: 195 km
- Apogee altitude: 301 km
- Inclination: 65.0°
- Period: 89.5 minutes
- Epoch: 13 March 1967

Kosmos 147 (Russian: Космос 147 meaning Cosmos 147) or Zenit-2 No.44 was a Soviet, first generation, low resolution, optical film-return reconnaissance satellite launched in 1967. A Zenit-2 spacecraft, Kosmos 147 was the forty-seventh of eighty-one such satellites to be launched. and had a mass of 4,000 kilograms (8,800 lb).

Kosmos 147 was launched by a Vostok-2 rocket, serial number N15001-06, flying from Site 41/1 at the Plesetsk Cosmodrome. The launch took place at 12:10:23 GMT on 13 March 1967, and following its successful arrival in orbit the spacecraft received its Kosmos designation; along with the International Designator 1967-022A and the Satellite Catalog Number 02710.

Kosmos 147 was operated in a low Earth orbit, at an epoch of 13 March 1967, it had a perigee of 195 kilometres (121 mi), an apogee of 301 kilometres (187 mi), an inclination of 65.0°, and an orbital period of 89.5 minutes. After eight days in orbit, Kosmos 147 was deorbited, with its return capsule descending under parachute and landing at 06:29 GMT on 21 March 1967, and recovered by the Soviet forces. An unspecified problem with the satellite resulted in the mission being considered a partial failure.

== See also ==
- 1967 in spaceflight
