= Kosmos 33 =

Soviet reconnaissance satellite (Zenit 2-19)

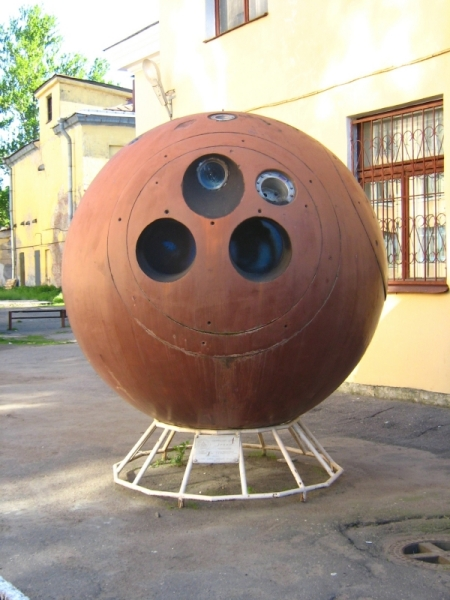
- A Zenit reentry capsule
- Names: Zenit 2-19
- Mission type: Optical imaging reconnaissance
- Operator: OKB-1
- COSPAR ID: 1964-033A
- SATCAT no.: 816
- Mission duration: 8 days

Spacecraft properties
- Spacecraft type: Zenit-2
- Manufacturer: OKB-1
- Launch mass: 4730 kg

Start of mission
- Launch date: 23 June 1964, 10:19:00 GMT
- Rocket: Vostok-2
- Launch site: Baikonur 31/6
- Contractor: OKB-1

End of mission
- Disposal: Recovered
- Landing date: 1 July 1964

Orbital parameters
- Reference system: Geocentric
- Regime: Low Earth
- Perigee altitude: 209 km
- Apogee altitude: 293 km
- Inclination: 65.0°
- Period: 89.4 minutes
- Epoch: 23 June 1964

Kosmos 33 (Russian: Космос 33 meaning Cosmos 33) or Zenit-2 No.19 was a Soviet, first generation, low resolution, optical film-return reconnaissance satellite launched in 1964. A Zenit-2 spacecraft, Kosmos 33 was the nineteenth of eighty-one such satellites to be launched and had a mass of 4,730 kilograms (10,430 lb).

Kosmos 33 was launched by a Vostok-2 rocket, serial number G15001-05, flying from Site 31/6 at the Baikonur Cosmodrome. The launch took place at 10:19 GMT on 23 June 1964, and following its successful arrival in orbit the spacecraft received its Kosmos designation; along with the International Designator 1964-033A and the Satellite Catalog Number 00816.

Kosmos 33 was operated in a low Earth orbit; at an epoch of 23 June 1964 it had a perigee of 209 kilometres (130 mi), an apogee of 293 kilometres (182 mi), inclination of 65.0° and an orbital period of 89.4 minutes. On 1 July 1964, after 8 days in orbit, the satellite was deorbited with its return capsule descending by parachute for recovery by Soviet forces.
