= Kosmos 66 =

Soviet reconnaissance satellite (Zenit 2-27)

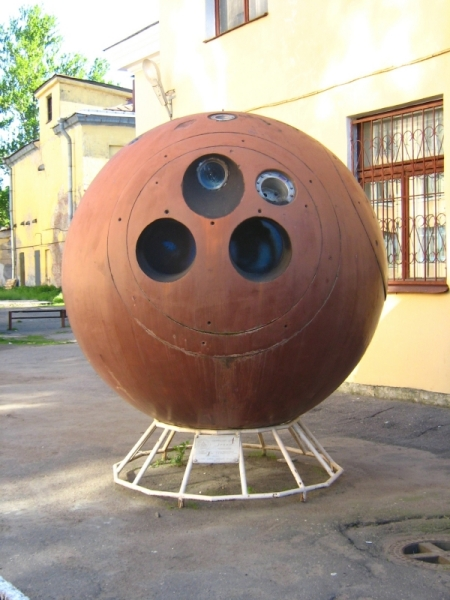
- A Zenit reentry capsule
- Names: Zenit 2-27
- Mission type: Optical imaging reconnaissance
- Operator: OKB-1
- COSPAR ID: 1965-035A
- SATCAT no.: 1362
- Mission duration: 8 days

Spacecraft properties
- Spacecraft type: Zenit-2
- Manufacturer: OKB-1
- Launch mass: 4730 kg

Start of mission
- Launch date: 7 May 1965, 09:50:00 GMT
- Rocket: Vostok-2
- Launch site: Baikonur 31/6
- Contractor: OKB-1

End of mission
- Disposal: Crashed (destroyed)
- Destroyed: 15 May 1965

Orbital parameters
- Reference system: Geocentric
- Regime: Low Earth
- Perigee altitude: 202 km
- Apogee altitude: 282 km
- Inclination: 65.0°
- Period: 89.3 minutes
- Epoch: 7 May 1965

Kosmos 66 (Russian: Космос 66 meaning Cosmos 66) or Zenit-2 No.27 was a Soviet, first generation, low resolution, optical film-return reconnaissance satellite launched in 1965. A Zenit-2 spacecraft, Kosmos 66 was the twenty-seventh of eighty-one such satellites to be launched and had a mass of 4,730 kilograms (10,430 lb).

Kosmos 66 was launched by a Vostok-2 rocket, serial number R15002-04, flying from Site 31/6 at the Baikonur Cosmodrome. The launch took place at 09:50 GMT on 7 May 1965, and following its successful arrival in orbit the spacecraft received its Kosmos designation; along with the International Designator 1965-035A and the Satellite Catalog Number 01362.

Kosmos 66 was operated in a low Earth orbit, on 7 May 1965 it had a perigee of 202 kilometres (126 mi), an apogee of 282 kilometres (175 mi), an inclination of 65.0° and an orbital period of 89.3 minutes. On 15 May 1965, after eight days in orbit, the satellite was deorbited so that its return capsule could be recovered and its photos analysed, however, the mission was unsuccessful because a parachute deployment failed and the spacecraft was destroyed in the subsequent crash.
