= Kosmos 115 =

Soviet reconnaissance satellite (Zenit 2-37)

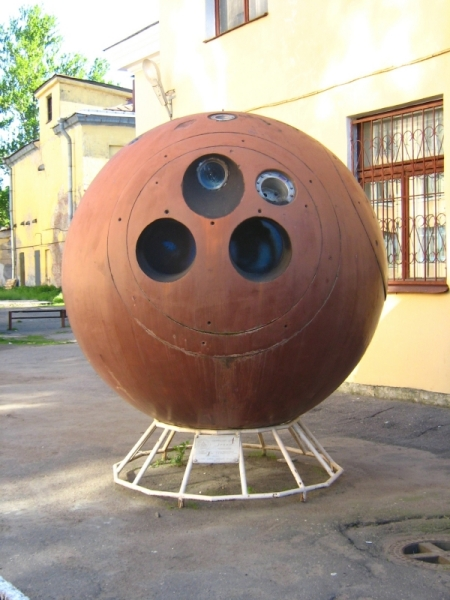
- A Zenit reentry capsule
- Names: Zenit 2-37
- Mission type: Optical imaging reconnaissance
- Operator: OKB-1
- COSPAR ID: 1966-033A
- SATCAT no.: 2147
- Mission duration: 7 days, 22 hours and 19 minutes

Spacecraft properties
- Spacecraft type: Zenit-2
- Manufacturer: OKB-1
- Launch mass: 4730 kg

Start of mission
- Launch date: 20 April 1966, 10:48:00 GMT
- Rocket: Vostok-2
- Launch site: Baikonur 31/6
- Contractor: OKB-1

End of mission
- Disposal: Recovered
- Landing date: 28 April 1966, 09:07 GMT

Orbital parameters
- Reference system: Geocentric
- Regime: Low Earth
- Perigee altitude: 201 km
- Apogee altitude: 294 km
- Inclination: 65.0°
- Period: 89.3 minutes
- Epoch: 20 April 1966

Kosmos 115 (Russian: Космос 115 meaning Cosmos 115) or Zenit-2 No.37 was a Soviet, first generation, low resolution, optical film-return reconnaissance satellite launched in 1966. A Zenit-2 spacecraft, Kosmos 115 was the thirty-seventh of eighty-one such satellites to be launched and had a mass of 4,730 kilograms (10,430 lb).

Kosmos 115 was launched by a Vostok-2 rocket flying from Site 31/6 at the Baikonur Cosmodrome. The launch took place at 10:48 GMT on 20 April 1966, and following its successful arrival in orbit the spacecraft received its Kosmos designation; along with the International Designator 1966-033A and the Satellite Catalog Number 02147.

Kosmos 115 was operated in a low Earth orbit, at an epoch of 22 April 1966, it had a perigee of 201 kilometres (125 mi), an apogee of 294 kilometres (183 mi), an inclination of 65.0° and an orbital period of 89.3 minutes. After eight days in orbit, Kosmos 115 was deorbited, with its return capsule descending under parachute and landing at 09:07 GMT on 28 April 1966 and the capsule was recovered by Soviet force. There was abnormal operation of a SA-10 camera. Due to a camera malfunction, the satellite failed to take all of the images it had been programmed to produce.
