= Kosmos 15 =

Soviet reconnaissance satellite (Zenit 2-9)

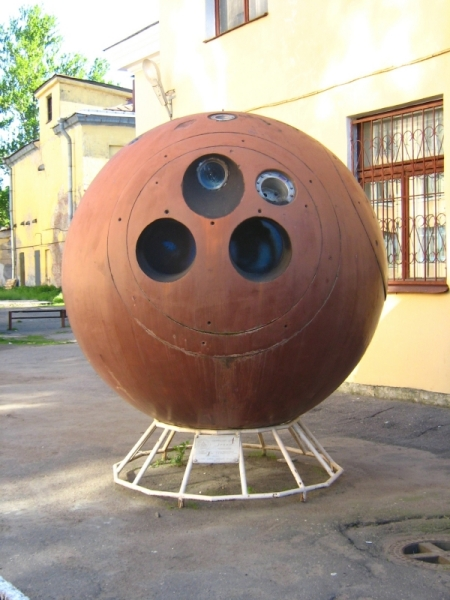
- A Zenit reentry capsule
- Names: Zenit 2-9
- Mission type: Optical imaging reconnaissance Radiation; Meteorology
- Operator: Soviet space program
- COSPAR ID: 1963-011A
- SATCAT no.: 569
- Mission duration: 5 days

Spacecraft properties
- Spacecraft type: Zenit-2
- Manufacturer: OKB-1
- Launch mass: 4730 kg

Start of mission
- Launch date: 22 April 1963, 08:24:00 GMT
- Rocket: Vostok-2
- Launch site: Baikonur 1/5
- Contractor: OKB-1

End of mission
- Disposal: Recovered
- Landing date: 27 April 1963
- Landing site: Steppe in Kazakhstan

Orbital parameters
- Reference system: Geocentric
- Regime: Low Earth
- Perigee altitude: 160 km
- Apogee altitude: 358 km
- Inclination: 65.0°
- Period: 89.8 minutes
- Epoch: 22 April 1963

Kosmos 15 (Russian: Космос 15 meaning Cosmos 15) or Zenit-2 No.9 was a Soviet optical film-return reconnaissance satellite which was launched in 1963. A Zenit-2 spacecraft, Kosmos 15 was the ninth of eighty-one such satellites to be launched.

== Spacecraft ==
Kosmos 15 was a Zenit-2 satellite, a first generation, low resolution, reconnaissance satellite derived from the Vostok spacecraft used for crewed flights, the satellites were developed by OKB-1. In addition to reconnaissance, it was also used for research into radiation in support of the Vostok programme. It had a mass of 4,730 kilograms (10,430 lb).

== Mission ==
The Vostok-2 rocket, serial number T15000-08, was used to launch Kosmos 15. The launch took place at 08:24 GMT on 22 April 1963, using Site 1/5 at the Baikonur Cosmodrome. Following its successful arrival in orbit the spacecraft received its Kosmos designation, along with the International Designator 1963-011A and the Satellite Catalog Number 00569. In addition to reconnaissance, Kosmos 15 carried an experiment package to measure radiation levels in its environment and was also used for meteorological research.

Kosmos 15 was operated in a low Earth orbit. On 24 April 1963, it had a perigee of 160 kilometres (99 mi), an apogee of 358 kilometres (222 mi), with an inclination of 65.0°, and an orbital period of 89.8 minutes. Having spent five days in orbit, the spacecraft was deorbited on 27 April 1963. Its return capsule descended under parachute and was recovered by the Soviet forces in steppe in Kazakhstan.

== See also ==
- 1963 in spaceflight
