= Kosmos 138 =

- Mission type: Optical imaging reconnaissance
- Operator: OKB-1
- COSPAR ID: 1967-004A
- SATCAT no.: 02646
- Mission duration: 8 days

Spacecraft properties
- Spacecraft type: Zenit-2
- Manufacturer: OKB-1
- Launch mass: 4730 kg

Start of mission
- Launch date: 19 January 1967; 12:39:59 GMT
- Rocket: Vostok-2 s/n N15001-05
- Launch site: Plesetsk, Site 41/1
- Contractor: OKB-1

End of mission
- Disposal: Recovered
- Landing date: 27 January 1967; 06:14 GMT

Orbital parameters
- Reference system: Geocentric
- Regime: Low Earth
- Perigee altitude: 191 km
- Apogee altitude: 273 km
- Inclination: 65.0°
- Period: 89.2 minutes
- Epoch: 19 January 1967

Kosmos 138 (Russian: Космос 138 meaning Cosmos 138) or Zenit-2 No.43 was a Soviet, first generation, low resolution, optical film-return reconnaissance satellite launched in 1967. A Zenit-2 spacecraft, Kosmos 138 was the forty-fifth of eighty-one such satellites to be launched and had a mass of 4,730 kilograms (10,430 lb).

Kosmos 138 was launched by a Vostok-2 rocket, serial number N15001-05, flying from Site 41/1 at the Plesetsk Cosmodrome. The launch took place at 12:39:59 GMT on 19 January 1967, and following its arrival in orbit the spacecraft received its Kosmos designation; along with the International Designator 1967-004A and the Satellite Catalog Number 02646. The satellite reached a slightly lower orbit than had been planned, but was still able to complete its mission.

Kosmos 138 was operated in a low Earth orbit, at an epoch of 19 January 1967, it had a perigee of 191 kilometres (119 mi), an apogee of 273 kilometres (170 mi), an inclination of 65.0°, and an orbital period of 89.2 minutes. After 8 days in orbit, Kosmos 138 was deorbited, with its return capsule descending under parachute, landing at 06:14 GMT on 27 January 1967, and recovered by Soviet force.
