= Kosmos 64 =

Soviet reconnaissance satellite (Zenit 2-26)

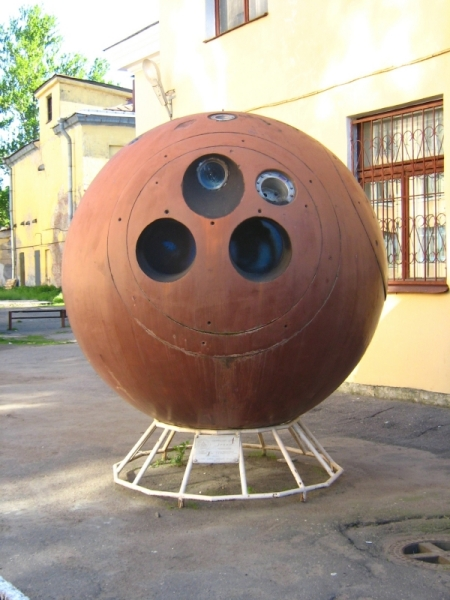
- A Zenit reentry capsule
- Names: Zenit 2-26
- Mission type: Optical imaging reconnaissance
- Operator: OKB-1
- COSPAR ID: 1965-025A
- SATCAT no.: 1305
- Mission duration: 8 days

Spacecraft properties
- Spacecraft type: Zenit-2
- Manufacturer: OKB-1
- Launch mass: 4720 kg

Start of mission
- Launch date: 25 March 1965, 10:04:00 GMT
- Rocket: Vostok-2
- Launch site: Baikonur 31/6
- Contractor: OKB-1

End of mission
- Disposal: Recovered
- Landing date: 2 April 1965

Orbital parameters
- Reference system: Geocentric
- Regime: Low Earth
- Perigee altitude: 201 km
- Apogee altitude: 267 km
- Inclination: 65.0°
- Period: 89.2 minutes
- Epoch: 25 March 1965

Kosmos 64 (Russian: Космос 64 meaning Cosmos 64) or Zenit-2 No.26 was a Soviet, first generation, low resolution, optical film-return reconnaissance satellite launched in 1965. A Zenit-2 satellite, Kosmos 64 was the twenty-sixth of eighty-one such spacecraft to be launched and had a mass of 4,720 kilograms (10,410 lb).

Kosmos 64 was launched by a Vostok-2 rocket, serial number G15001-06, flying from Site 31/6 at the Baikonur Cosmodrome. The launch took place at 10:04 GMT on 25 March 1965, and following its successful arrival in orbit the spacecraft received its Kosmos designation; along with the International Designator 1965-025A and the Satellite Catalog Number 01305.

Kosmos 64 was operated in a low Earth orbit, on 25 March 1965 it had a perigee of 201 kilometres (125 mi), an apogee of 267 kilometres (166 mi), an inclination of 65.0° and an orbital period of 89.2 minutes. On 2 April 1965, after eight days in orbit, Kosmos 64 was deorbited with its return capsule descending by parachute for recovery by Soviet forces.
