= Kosmos 20 =

Soviet reconnaissance satellite (Zenit 2-13)

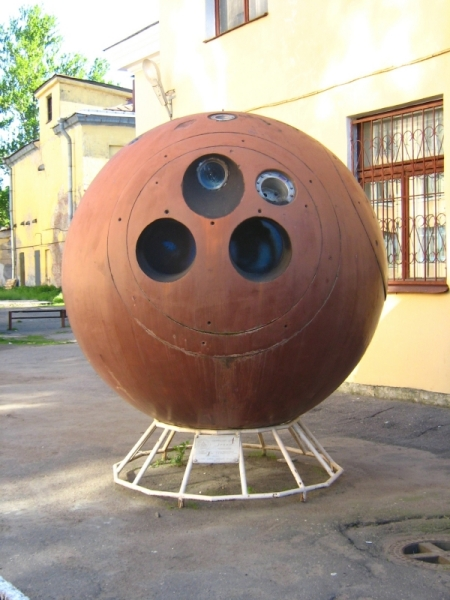
- A Zenit reentry capsule
- Names: Zenit 2-13
- Mission type: Optical imaging reconnaissance
- Operator: Soviet space program
- COSPAR ID: 1963-040A
- SATCAT no.: 673
- Mission duration: 8 days

Spacecraft properties
- Spacecraft type: Zenit-2
- Manufacturer: OKB-1
- Launch mass: 4730 kg

Start of mission
- Launch date: 18 October 1963, 09:36:00 GMT
- Rocket: Vostok-2
- Launch site: Baikonur 1/5
- Contractor: OKB-1

End of mission
- Disposal: Recovered
- Landing date: 26 October 1963
- Landing site: Steppe in Kazakhstan

Orbital parameters
- Reference system: Geocentric
- Regime: Low Earth
- Perigee altitude: 205 km
- Apogee altitude: 302 km
- Inclination: 65.0°
- Period: 89.6 minutes
- Epoch: 18 October 1963

Kosmos 20 (Russian: Космос 20 meaning Cosmos 20) or Zenit-2 No.13 was a Soviet optical film-return reconnaissance satellite which was launched in 1963. A Zenit-2 satellite, Kosmos 20 was the thirteenth of eighty-one such spacecraft to be launched.

== Spacecraft ==
Kosmos 20 was a Zenit-2 satellite, a first generation, low resolution, reconnaissance satellite derived from the Vostok spacecraft used for crewed flights, the satellites were developed by OKB-1. In addition to reconnaissance, it was also used for research into radiation in support of the Vostok programme. It had a mass of 4,730 kilograms (10,430 lb).

== Launch ==
The Vostok-2 rocket, serial number G15001-01, was used to launch Kosmos 20. The launch took place at 09:36:00 GMT on 18 October 1963, using Site 1/5 at the Baikonur Cosmodrome. Following its successful arrival in orbit the spacecraft received its Kosmos designation, along with the International Designator 1963-040A and the Satellite Catalog Number 00673.

== Mission ==
Kosmos 20 was operated in a low Earth orbit. On 18 October 1963, it had a perigee of 205 kilometres (127 mi), an apogee of 302 kilometres (188 mi), an inclination of 65.0°, and an orbital period of 89.6 minutes. Having spent eight days in orbit, the spacecraft was deorbited on 26 October 1963. Its return capsule descended under parachute and was recovered by the Soviet forces in the steppe in Kazakhstan.

== See also ==
- 1963 in spaceflight
