= Kosmos 37 =

Soviet reconnaissance satellite (Zenit 2-21)

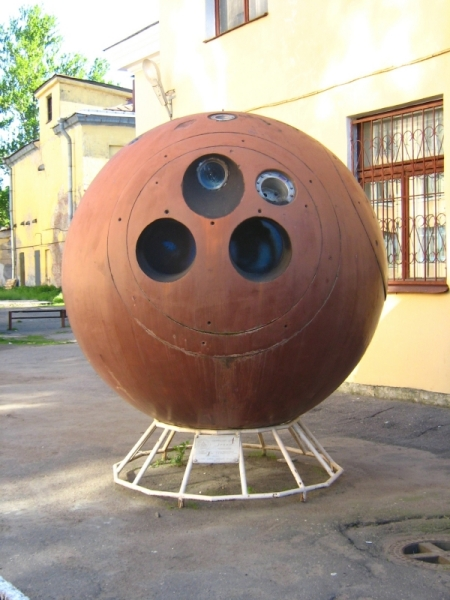
- A Zenit reentry capsule
- Names: Zenit 2-21
- Mission type: Optical imaging reconnaissance
- Operator: OKB-1
- COSPAR ID: 1964-044A
- SATCAT no.: 848
- Mission duration: 8 days

Spacecraft properties
- Spacecraft type: Zenit-2
- Manufacturer: OKB-1
- Launch mass: 4730 kg

Start of mission
- Launch date: 14 August 1964, 09:36:00 GMT
- Rocket: Vostok-2
- Launch site: Baikonur 31/6
- Contractor: OKB-1

End of mission
- Disposal: Recovered
- Landing date: 22 August 1964

Orbital parameters
- Reference system: Geocentric
- Regime: Low Earth
- Perigee altitude: 207 km
- Apogee altitude: 287 km
- Inclination: 65.0°
- Period: 89.5 minutes
- Epoch: 14 August 1964

Kosmos 37 (Russian: Космос 37 meaning Cosmos 37) or Zenit-2 No.21 was a Soviet, first generation, low resolution, optical film-return reconnaissance satellite launched in 1964. A Zenit-2 spacecraft, Kosmos 37 was the twentieth of eighty-one such satellites to be launched and had a mass of 4,730 kilograms (10,430 lb).

Kosmos 37 was launched by a Vostok-2 rocket, serial number R15001-04, flying from Site 31/6 at the Baikonur Cosmodrome. The launch took place at 09:36 GMT on 14 August 1964, and following its successful arrival in orbit the spacecraft received its Kosmos designation, along with the International Designator 1964-044A and the Satellite Catalog Number 00848.

Kosmos 37 was operated in a low Earth orbit, it had a perigee of 207 kilometres (129 mi), an apogee of 287 kilometres (178 mi), inclination of 65.0° and an orbital period of 89.5 minutes. During the mission one of the satellite's film reels snapped, resulting in the associated camera only taking some of the images it had been programmed to produce. The mission has been partially complete because there was a break in the film of the SA-10 camera. On 22 August 1964, after eight days in orbit, Kosmos 37 was deorbited with its return capsule descending by parachute for recovery by Soviet forces.
