= Kosmos 16 =

Soviet reconnaissance satellite (Zenit 2-10)

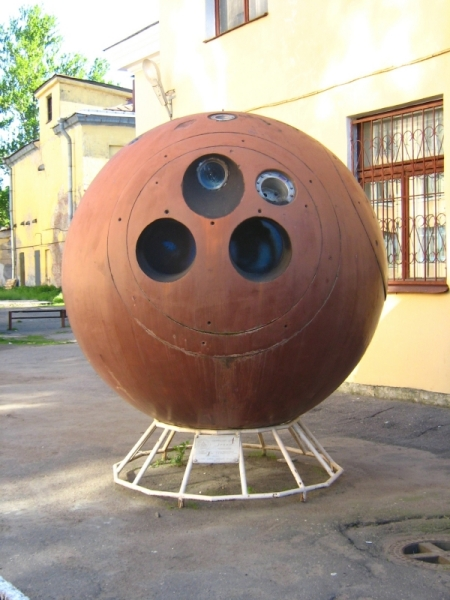
- A Zenit reentry capsule
- Names: Zenit 2-10
- Mission type: Optical imaging reconnaissance
- COSPAR ID: 1963-012A
- SATCAT no.: 571
- Mission duration: 10 days

Spacecraft properties
- Spacecraft type: Zenit-2
- Manufacturer: OKB-1
- Launch mass: 4730 kg

Start of mission
- Launch date: 28 April 1963, 09:36:00 GMT
- Rocket: Vostok-2
- Launch site: Baikonur 1/5
- Contractor: OKB-1

End of mission
- Disposal: Recovered
- Landing date: 8 May 1963
- Landing site: Steppe in Kazakhstan

Orbital parameters
- Reference system: Geocentric
- Regime: Low Earth
- Perigee altitude: 194 km
- Apogee altitude: 388 km
- Inclination: 65.0°
- Period: 90.4 minutes
- Epoch: 28 April 1963

Kosmos 16 (Russian: Космос 16 meaning Cosmos 16) or Zenit-2 No.10 was a Soviet optical film-return reconnaissance satellite which was launched in 1963. A Zenit-2 satellite, Kosmos 16 was the tenth of eighty-one such spacecraft to be launched.

== Spacecraft ==
Kosmos 16 was a Zenit-2 satellite, a first generation, low resolution, reconnaissance satellite derived from the Vostok spacecraft used for crewed flights, the satellites were developed by OKB-1. In addition to reconnaissance, it was also used for research into radiation in support of the Vostok programme. It had a mass of 4,730 kilograms (10,430 lb).

== Mission ==
The Vostok-2 rocket, serial number E15000-02, was used to launch Kosmos 16. The launch took place at 09:36:00 GMT on 28 April 1963, using Site 1/5 at the Baikonur Cosmodrome. Following its successful arrival in orbit the spacecraft received its Kosmos designation, along with the International Designator 1963-012A and the Satellite Catalog Number 00571.

Kosmos 16 was operated in a low Earth orbit. On 30 April 1963, it had a perigee of 194 kilometres (121 mi), an apogee of 388 kilometres (241 mi), with an inclination of 65.0°, and an orbital period of 90.4 minutes. A malfunction of the spacecraft's attitude control system resulted in the satellite being able to return only some of the images, due to the failure of the engine block stabilisation system. After ten days in orbit, the spacecraft was deorbited on 8 May 1963. Its return capsule descended under a parachute and was recovered by the Soviet forces in the steppe in Kazakhstan.

== See also ==
- 1963 in spaceflight
