= Kosmos 132 =

Soviet first generation reconnaissance satellite

- Mission type: Optical imaging reconnaissance
- Operator: OKB-1
- COSPAR ID: 1966-106A
- SATCAT no.: 02599
- Mission duration: 8 days

Spacecraft properties
- Spacecraft type: Zenit-2
- Manufacturer: OKB-1
- Launch mass: 4730 kg

Start of mission
- Launch date: 19 November 1966; 08:09:00 GMT
- Rocket: Vostok-2 s/n N15001-08
- Launch site: Baikonur, Site 31/6
- Contractor: OKB-1

End of mission
- Disposal: Recovered
- Landing date: 27 November 1966; 07:12 GMT

Orbital parameters
- Reference system: Geocentric
- Regime: Low Earth
- Perigee altitude: 210 km
- Apogee altitude: 276 km
- Inclination: 65.0°
- Period: 89.3 minutes
- Epoch: 19 November 1966

Kosmos 132 (Russian: Космос 132 meaning Cosmos 132) or Zenit-2 No.46 was a Soviet, first generation, low resolution, optical film-return reconnaissance satellite launched in 1966. A Zenit-2 spacecraft, Kosmos 132 was the forty-third of eighty-one such satellites to be launched and had a mass of 4,730 kilograms (10,430 lb).

Kosmos 132 was launched by a Vostok-2 rocket, serial number N15001-08, flying from Site 31/6 at the Baikonur Cosmodrome. The launch took place at 08:09 GMT on 19 November 1966, and following its successful arrival in orbit the spacecraft received its Kosmos designation, along with the International Designator 1966-106A and the Satellite Catalog Number 02599.

Kosmos 132 was operated in a low Earth orbit, at an epoch of 19 November 1966, it had a perigee of 210 kilometres (130 mi), an apogee of 276 kilometres (171 mi), an inclination of 65.0°, and an orbital period of 89.3 minutes. After spending eight days in orbit, Kosmos 132 was deorbited with its return capsule descending under parachute, landing at 07:12 GMT on 27 November 1966, and recovered by Soviet force.
