= Kosmos 48 =

Soviet reconnaissance satellite (1964)

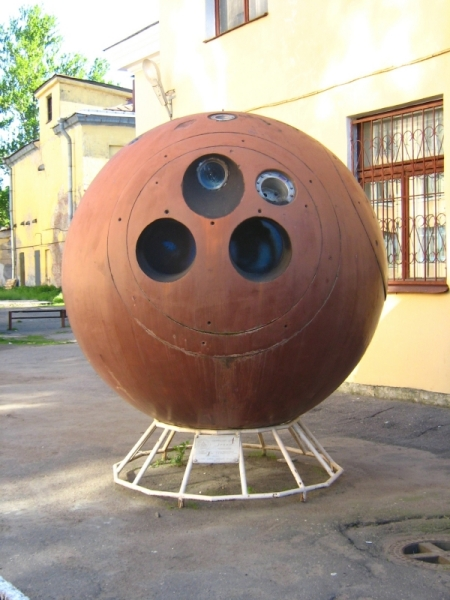
- A Zenit reentry capsule
- Names: Zenit 2-23
- Mission type: Optical imaging reconnaissance
- Operator: OKB-1
- COSPAR ID: 1964-066A
- SATCAT no.: 908
- Mission duration: 6 days

Spacecraft properties
- Spacecraft type: Zenit-2
- Manufacturer: OKB-1
- Launch mass: 4730 kg

Start of mission
- Launch date: 14 October 1964; 09:50:00 GMT
- Rocket: Vostok-2
- Launch site: Baikonur 31/6

End of mission
- Disposal: Recovered
- Landing date: 20 October 1964

Orbital parameters
- Reference system: Geocentric
- Regime: Low Earth
- Perigee altitude: 204 km
- Apogee altitude: 284 km
- Inclination: 65.1°
- Period: 89.4 minutes
- Epoch: 14 October 1964

Kosmos 48 (Russian: Космос 48, romanized: Cosmos 48), also referred to as Zenit-2 No.23, was a Soviet, first generation, low resolution, optical film-return reconnaissance satellite launched in 1964. A Zenit-2 spacecraft, Kosmos 48 was the twenty-third of eighty-one such satellites to be launched and had a mass of 4,730 kilograms (10,430 lb).

Kosmos 48 was launched by a Vostok-2 rocket, serial number R15002-01, flying from Site 31/6 at the Baikonur Cosmodrome. The launch took place at 09:50 GMT on 14 October 1964, and following its successful arrival in orbit the spacecraft received its Kosmos designation; along with the International Designator 1964-066A and the Satellite Catalog Number 00908.

Kosmos 48 was operated in a low Earth orbit; on 14 October 1964 it had a perigee of 204 kilometres (127 mi), an apogee of 284 kilometres (176 mi), inclination of 65.1° and an orbital period of 89.4 minutes. Midway through its planned reconnaissance mission, the thermal control system malfunctioned, with the temperature inside the spacecraft's pressurised capsule increasing to 43 °C. As a result of the malfunction, the spacecraft was deorbited two days earlier than planned, on 20 October 1964, six days after launch. The return capsule, containing the cameras and film, was successfully recovered by parachute for recovery by Soviet forces.
