= Kosmos 124 =

Soviet reconnaissance satellite

- Mission type: Optical imaging reconnaissance
- Operator: OKB-1
- COSPAR ID: 1966-064A
- SATCAT no.: 02325
- Mission duration: 8 days

Spacecraft properties
- Spacecraft type: Zenit-2
- Manufacturer: OKB-1
- Launch mass: 4730 kg

Start of mission
- Launch date: 14 July 1966, 10:33:00 GMT
- Rocket: Voskhod 11A57 s/n N15001-14
- Launch site: Baikonur, Site 31/6
- Contractor: OKB-1

End of mission
- Disposal: Recovered
- Landing date: 22 July 1966, 09:22 GMT

Orbital parameters
- Reference system: Geocentric
- Regime: Low Earth
- Perigee altitude: 205 km
- Apogee altitude: 286 km
- Inclination: 51.8°
- Period: 89.4 minutes
- Epoch: 16 July 1966

Kosmos 124 (Russian: Космос 124 meaning Cosmos 124) or Zenit-2 No.42 was a Soviet, first generation, low resolution, optical film-return reconnaissance satellite launched in 1966. A Zenit-2 spacecraft, Kosmos 124 was the fortieth of eighty-one such satellites to be launched and had a mass of 4,730 kilograms (10,430 lb).

Kosmos 124 was launched by a Voskhod 11A57 rocket with serial number N15001-14, flying from Site 31/6 at the Baikonur Cosmodrome. The launch took place at 10:33 GMT on 14 July 1966, and following its successful arrival in orbit the spacecraft received its Kosmos designation; along with the International Designator 1966-064A and the Satellite Catalog Number 02325.

Kosmos 124 was operated in a low Earth orbit, at an epoch of 14 July 1966, it had a perigee of 205 kilometres (127 mi), an apogee of 286 kilometres (178 mi), an inclination of 51.8°, and an orbital period of 89.4 minutes. After eight days in orbit, Kosmos 124 was deorbited, with its return capsule descending under parachute, landing at 09:22 GMT on 22 July 1966, and recovered by Soviet force.
