= Zenit (satellite) =

Series of Soviet spy satellites, 1961-2004

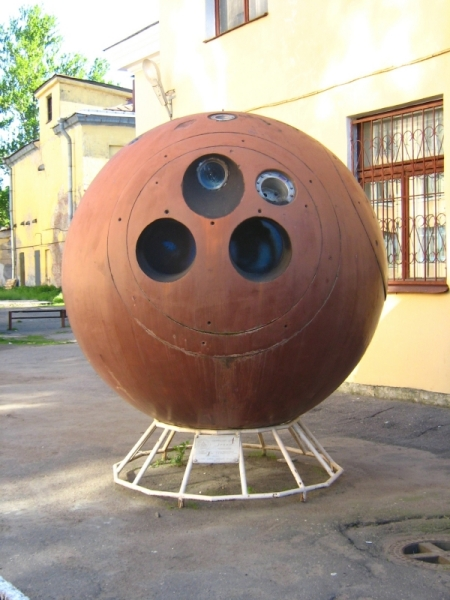
- Zenit re-entry capsule, showing camera ports
- Manufacturer: OKB-1
- Country of origin: Soviet Union
- Operator: Soviet space program
- Applications: Photo reconnaissance

Production
- Status: Retired
- Launched: 688
- Lost: 21
- Maiden launch: 11 Dec 1961; Zenit 2-1
- Last launch: 7 Jun 1994; Kosmos 2281
- Last retirement: 8 Nov 2004; Zenit 8-103

Related spacecraft
- Derived from: Vostok

Zenit (Russian: Зени́т, lit. 'Zenith', IPA: [zʲɪˈnʲit]) was a series of military photoreconnaissance satellites launched by the Soviet Union between 1961 and 1994. To conceal their nature, all flights were given the public Kosmos designation.

== Description ==
The basic design of the Zenit satellites was similar to the Vostok crewed spacecraft, sharing the return and service modules. It consisted of a spherical re-entry capsule 2.3 metres (7.5 ft) in diameter with a mass of around 2,400 kilograms (5,300 lb). This capsule contained the camera system, its film, recovery beacons, parachutes and a destruct charge. In orbit, this was attached to a service module that contained batteries, electronic equipment, an orientation system and a liquid-fuelled rocket engine that would slow the Zenit for re-entry, before the service module detached. The total length in orbit was around 5 metres (16 ft) and the total mass was between 4,600 and 4,740 kilograms (10,140 and 10,450 lb).

Unlike the American CORONA spacecraft, the return capsule carried both the film and the cameras and kept them in a temperature-controlled pressurised environment. This simplified the design and engineering of the camera system but added considerably to the mass of the satellite. An advantage was that cameras could be reused. The camera would either land on the ground or be recovered in midair by a modified Mil Mi-8 helicopter.

Early Zenits were launched using the Vostok rocket; later versions used the Voskhod and the Soyuz rockets. The first flights were launched from Baikonur Cosmodrome but subsequent launches also took place at Plesetsk Cosmodrome.

Most Zenits flew in a slightly elliptical orbit with a perigee of around 200 kilometres (120 miles) and an apogee between 250 and 350 kilometres (160 and 220 miles); the missions usually lasted between 8 and 15 days.

== History ==
In 1956, the Soviet government issued a secret decree that authorised the development of "Object D" which led to the program to launch Sputnik 3 (Sputnik 1 was a simplified spin-off of the Object D program.) The text of the decree remains secret, but it apparently authorised another satellite program – "Object OD-1" – which was to be used for photo-reconnaissance from space.

By 1958, the OKB-1 design bureau was simultaneously working on Object OD-1 and Object OD-2 – an early design for the Vostok crewed spacecraft. The development of Object OD-1 was experiencing serious difficulties so the head of OKB-1, Sergei Korolev, initiated work to see if a design based on Object OD-2 could be used for an uncrewed photo-reconnaissance satellite. This may have been a political manoeuvre that would enable him to continue the crewed space program and avoid diverting more of OKB-1's resources into Object OD-1.

Despite bitter opposition from the military the Soviet government endorsed Korolev's approach and issued decrees on 22 and 25 May 1959 which ordered the development of three different spacecraft, all based on the same basic, Object OD-2, design. Spacecraft 1K would be a simplified prototype, 2K was to be a reconnaissance satellite and 3K was to be for crewed flights. The name Vostok was also initially used for all three of these craft. But in 1961 the name became publicly known as the name of Yuri Gagarin's spacecraft so the "Vostok 2" reconnaissance satellite was renamed "Zenit 2".

The first Zenit launch attempt took place on 11 December 1961, but there was a fault in the rocket's third stage and the spacecraft was destroyed using its destruct charge. The second attempt — publicly referred to as Kosmos 4 — was successfully launched on 26 April 1962 and re-entered three days later. However a failure in the orientation system meant few useful pictures were obtained; usable pictures had a resolution of about 5 to 7 meters. Launch #3 on 1 June 1962 failed dramatically when one of the 8A92 booster's strap-ons shut down at liftoff and fell onto the pad, exploding on impact. The rest of the launch vehicle crashed 300 meters away. This accident caused considerable damage to Site 1, delaying the flights of Vostok 3 and Vostok 4 by two months.

On 28 July 1962, Site 1 was back in service to host the next Zenit flight, which performed successfully. Testing continued over the next year largely without incident but on 10 July 1963, another launch accident occurred in practically identical fashion to the June 1962 failure. Once again, one of the strap-ons shut down at liftoff, separated from the booster, and exploded on impact with the pad while the rest of the launch vehicle crashed a few hundred feet away.

Examination of telemetry from the booster indicated that some sort of electrical failure occurred, but subsequent investigation took three months and finally concluded that a switch designed to cut power to the strap-ons at staging had malfunctioned, possibly due to liftoff-induced vibration. The electrical circuit in the 8A92 was redesigned and it never again experienced problems with the strap-ons shutting down at launch.

Many versions of the satellite were developed for different reconnaissance missions and flights continued until 1994.

== Zenit variants ==
=== Zenit 2 ===
Zenit 2 was the first version to be launched between 1961 and 1970 (there was no Zenit 1).

The arrangement of cameras varied, but most flights carried four cameras of 1000 mm focal length, and one of 200 mm focal length. The single lower resolution camera was intended to provide low-resolution pictures that would help give a context to the high-resolution pictures.

Each camera had 1500 frames of film and from 200 km (120 mi), each frame held an image of a 60 km × 60 km (37 mi × 37 mi) square. The ground resolution was stated to be 10–15 m (33–49 ft) although some unofficial sources claim it was much better—one source claims the number of cars in a car park could be counted. The cameras were developed at the Krasnogorsk Optical-Mechanical Factory near Moscow. The Krasnogorsk factory, which had been producing a variety of optical equipment for the military since 1942, was also the manufacturer of the popular Zenit SLR cameras.

Zenit 2s also carried ELINT equipment called Kust-12M (bush) to receive NATO radar signals. The satellites carried a parabolic antenna, around 1 m (3 ft 3 in) in diameter, that is associated with this equipment. However, it is unclear if the antenna transmitted recorded signals to the ground or was for intercepting radar signals. In the latter case they would have been recorded on magnetic tape, to be retrieved after the return capsule landed.

There were 81 Zenit 2 launches. 58 were successful and 13 were partially successful. There were 9 failed missions, 2 because of a satellite malfunction and 7 because of a failure in the launch vehicle.

Zenit-2
No.	Mission	Launch date (GMT)	Landing date	COSPAR ID	Orbit	Duration (in orbit)	Outcome
1	-	11 December 1961; 09:39	-	-	(Suborbital)	-	Failure
2	Kosmos 4	26 April 1962; 10:02	29 April 1962	1962-014A	285 x 317 km	3 days	Partial failure
3	-	1 June 1962; 09:38	-	-	(Suborbital)	-	Failure
4	Kosmos 7	28 July 1962; 09:18	1 August 1962	1962-033A	197 x 356 km	4 days	Success
5	Kosmos 9	27 September 1962; 09:39	1 October 1962	1962-048A	829 x 981 km	4 days	Success
6	Kosmos 10	17 October 1962; 09:00	21 October 1962	1962-054A	178 x 376 km	4 days	Success
7	Kosmos 12	22 December 1962; 09:23	30 December 1962	1962-072A	202 x 385 km	8 days	Success
8	Kosmos 13	21 March 1963; 08:30	29 March 1963	1963-006A	214 x 303 km	8 days	Success
9	Kosmos 15	22 April 1963; 08:30	27 April 1963	1963-011A	194 x 336 km	5 days	Success
10	Kosmos 16	28 April 1963; 08:50	8 May 1963	1963-012A	201 x 379 km	16 days	Partial failure
11	Kosmos 18	24 May 1963; 10:33	2 June 1963	1963-018A	212 x 269 km	9 days	Success
12	-	10 July 1963	-	-	(Suborbital)	-	Failure
13	Kosmos 20	18 October 1963; 09:29	26 October 1963	1963-040A	201 x 296 km	8 days	Success
14	-	28 November 1963	-	-	(Suborbital)	-	Failure
15	Kosmos 24	19 December 1963; 09:28	28 December 1963	1963-052A	204 x 391 km	9 days	Success
16	Kosmos 28	4 April 1964; 09:36	12 April 1964	1964-017A	213 x 373 km	8 days	Success
17	Kosmos 29	25 April 1964; 10:19	2 May 1964	1964-021A	203 x 292 km	7 days	Success
18	Kosmos 32	10 June 1964; 10:48	18 June 1964	1964-029A	205 x 322 km	8 days	Success
19	Kosmos 33	23 June 1964; 10:19	1 July 1964	1964-033A	205 x 279 km	8 days	Success
20	Kosmos 35	15 July 1964; 11:31	23 July 1964	1964-039A	218 x 258 km	8 days	Success
21	Kosmos 37	14 August 1964; 09:36	22 August 1964	1964-044A	208 x 240 km	8 days	Partial failure
22	Kosmos 46	24 September 1964; 12:00	2 October 1964	1964-059A	211 x 264 km	8 days	Success
23	Kosmos 48	14 October 1964; 09:50	20 October 1964	1964-066A	204 x 284 km	6 days	Partial failure
24	Kosmos 50	28 October 1964; 10:48	5 November 1964	1964-070A	190 x 233 km	8 days	Success
25	Kosmos 52	11 January 1965; 09:36	19 January 1965	1965-001A	203 x 298 km	8 days	Success
26	Kosmos 64	25 March 1965; 10:04	2 April 1965	1965-025A	205 x 250 km	8 days	Success
27	Kosmos 66	7 May 1965; 09:50	15 May 1965	1965-035A	285 x 397 km	8 days	Failure
28	Kosmos 68	15 June 1965; 10:04	23 June 1965	1965-046A	208 x 306 km	8 days	Success
29	-	13 July 1965	-	-	(Suborbital)	-	Failure
30	Kosmos 78	14 August 1965; 11:16	22 August 1965	1965-066A	330 x 379 km	8 days	Success
31	Kosmos 98	27 November 1965; 08:24	5 December 1965	1965-097A	205 x 547 km	8 days	Success
32	Kosmos 99	10 December 1965; 08:09	18 December 1965	1965-103A	203 x 309 km	8 days	Success
33	Kosmos 104	7 January 1966; 08:24	15 January 1966	1966-001A	195 x 379 km	8 days	Partial failure
34	Kosmos 105	22 January 1966; 08:38	30 January 1966	1966-003A	203 x 311 km	8 days	Success
35	Kosmos 107	10 February 1966; 08:52	18 February 1966	1966-010A	216 x 313 km	8 days	Success
36	Kosmos 112	17 March 1966; 10:28	25 March 1966	1966-021A	214 x 664 km	8 days	Success
37	Kosmos 115	20 April 1966; 10:48	28 April 1966	1966-033A	189 x 283 km	8 days	Partial failure
38	Kosmos 117	6 May 1966; 11:02	14 May 1966	1966-037A	200 x 314 km	8 days	Success
39	Kosmos 120	8 June 1966; 11:02	16 June 1966	1966-050A	201 x 331 km	8 days	Success
40	Kosmos 124	14 July 1966; 10:33	22 July 1966	1966-064A	202 x 282 km	8 days	Success
41	-	16 September 1966; 09:30	-	-	(Suborbital)	-	Failure
42	Kosmos 129	14 October 1966; 12:13	21 October 1966	1966-091A	199 x 288 km	7 days	Success
43	Kosmos 132	19 November 1966; 08:09	27 November 1966	1966-106A	202 x 257 km	8 days	Success
44	Kosmos 136	19 December 1966; 12:00	27 December 1966	1966-064A	202 x 282 km	8 days	Success
45	Kosmos 138	19 January 1967; 12:39	27 January 1967	1967-004A	190 x 273 km	8 days	Success
46	Kosmos 143	27 February 1967; 08:45	7 March 1967	1967-017A	202 x 390 km	8 days	Success
47	Kosmos 147	13 March 1967; 12:10	21 March 1967	1967-022A	195 x 298 km	8 days	Partial failure
48	Kosmos 153	4 April 1967; 14:00	12 April 1967	1967-030A	199 x 279 km	8 days	Partial failure
49	Kosmos 157	12 May 1967; 10:30	20 May 1967	1967-044A	249 x 262 km	8 days	Partial failure
50	Kosmos 164	8 June 1967; 13:00	14 Jun 1967	1967-057A	185 x 317 km	6 days	Success
51	Kosmos 168	4 July 1967; 05:59	12 July 1967	1967-067A	223 x 230 km	8 days	Success
52	-	1 September 1967; 10:30	-	-	(Suborbital)	-	Failure
53	Kosmos 177	16 September 1967; 06:06	24 September 1967	1967-088A	201 x 267 km	8 days	Success
54	Kosmos 180	26 September 1967; 10:20	4 October 1967	1967-093A	206 x 350 km	8 days	Success
55	Kosmos 181	11 October 1967; 11:30	19 October 1967	1967-067A	198 x 325 km	8 days	Success
56	Kosmos 193	25 November 1967; 11:30	3 December 1967	1967-117A	745 x 756 km	8 days	Success
57	Kosmos 195	16 December 1967; 12:00	24 December 1967	1967-124A	204 x 352 km	8 days	Success
58	Kosmos 199	16 January 1968; 12:00	1 February 1968	1968-003C	206 x 363 km	16 days	Failure
59	Kosmos 205	5 March 1968; 12:30	13 March 1968	1968-016A	197 x 293 km	8 days	Success
60	Kosmos 210	3 April 1968; 11:00	11 April 1968	1968-024A	200 x 373 km	8 days	Success
61	Kosmos 216	20 April 1968; 10:30	28 April 1968	1968-034A	198 x 267 km	8 days	Partial failure
62	Kosmos 223	1 June 1968; 10:50	9 June 1968	1968-045A	221 x 317 km	8 days	Success
63	Kosmos 231	10 July 1968; 19:49	18 July 1968	1968-058A	206 x 311 km	8 days	Success
64	Kosmos 235	9 August 1968; 07:00	17 August 1968	1968-067A	201 x 281 km	8 days	Partial failure
65	Kosmos 240	14 September 1968; 06:50	21 September 1968	1968-075A	203 x 283 km	7 days	Success
66	Kosmos 247	11 October 1968; 12:05	19 October 1968	1968-088A	199 x 345 km	8 days	Success
67	Kosmos 253	13 November 1968; 12:00	18 November 1968	1968-102A	216 x 337 km	5 days	Partial failure
68	Kosmos 255	29 November 1968; 12:40	7 December 1968	1968-105A	197 x 317 km	8 days	Success
69	Kosmos 258	10 December 1968; 08:25	18 December 1968	1968-111A	205 x 298 km	8 days	Success
70	Kosmos 263	12 January 1969; 12:10	20 January 1969	1969-003A	200 x 325 km	8 days	Success
71	Kosmos 266	25 February 1969; 10:20	5 March 1969	1969-015A	202 x 336 km	8 days	Success
72	Kosmos 273	22 March 1969; 12:15	30 March 1969	1969-027A	200 x 336 km	8 days	Success
73	Kosmos 278	9 April 1969; 13:00	17 April 1969	1969-034A	198 x 310 km	8 days	Success
74	Kosmos 281	13 May 1969; 09:15	21 May 1969	1969-042A	191 x 303 km	8 days	Success
75	Kosmos 287	24 June 1969; 06:50	2 July 1969	1969-054A	189 x 265 km	8 days	Success
76	Kosmos 290	22 July 1969; 12:30	30 July 1969	1969-060A	195 x 332 km	8 days	Success
77	Kosmos 301	24 September 1969; 12:15	2 October 1969	1969-081A	203 x 271 km	8 days	Success
78	Kosmos 309	12 November 1969; 11:30	20 November 1969	1969-098A	185 x 364 km	8 days	Success
79	Kosmos 325	4 March 1970; 12:14	12 March 1970	1970-015A	200 x 327 km	8 days	Success
80	Kosmos 326	13 March 1970; 08:00	21 March 1970	1970-018A	208 x 232 km	8 days	Success
81	Kosmos 344	12 May 1970; 10:10	20 May 1970	1970-038A	204 x 326 km	8 days	Partial failure

=== Zenit 2M ===
Improvements included a new camera system and the addition of solar panels. As the spacecraft mass was increased to 6300 kg, the Vostok rocket was replaced by the Voskhod rocket and Soyuz rockets. In common with Zenit 2 satellites this also had an ELINT payload.

A total of 101 Zenit-2M satellites were launched between 1968 and 1979

- Kosmos 208
- Kosmos 228
- Kosmos 243
- Kosmos 293
- Kosmos 306
- Kosmos 313
- Kosmos 318
- Kosmos 329
- Kosmos 350
- Kosmos 353
- Kosmos 363
- Kosmos 366
- Kosmos 368
- Kosmos 377
- Kosmos 384
- Kosmos 392
- Zenit 2M-17
- Kosmos 403
- Kosmos 410
- Kosmos 428
- Kosmos 431
- Kosmos 439
- Kosmos 443
- Zenit 2M-24
- Kosmos 473
- Kosmos 477
- Kosmos 484
- Kosmos 490
- Kosmos 493
- Kosmos 512
- Kosmos 517
- Kosmos 518
- Kosmos 525
- Kosmos 537
- Kosmos 547
- Kosmos 552
- Kosmos 555
- Kosmos 561
- Kosmos 575
- Kosmos 578
- Kosmos 583
- Kosmos 596
- Kosmos 599
- Kosmos 629
- Kosmos 635
- Kosmos 640
- Kosmos 653
- Kosmos 658
- Kosmos 669
- Zenit 2M-50
- Kosmos 685
- Kosmos 692
- Kosmos 696
- Kosmos 702
- Kosmos 721
- Kosmos 728
- Kosmos 731
- Kosmos 741
- Kosmos 747
- Kosmos 751
- Kosmos 769
- Kosmos 776
- Kosmos 780
- Kosmos 784
- Kosmos 799
- Kosmos 809
- Kosmos 813
- Kosmos 819
- Kosmos 834
- Kosmos 840
- Kosmos 848
- Kosmos 856
- Kosmos 865
- Kosmos 879
- Kosmos 889
- Kosmos 898
- Kosmos 904
- Kosmos 914
- Kosmos 922
- Kosmos 935
- Kosmos 947
- Kosmos 950
- Kosmos 966
- Kosmos 973
- Kosmos 984
- Kosmos 992
- Kosmos 995
- Kosmos 1002
- Kosmos 1004
- Kosmos 1012
- Kosmos 1032
- Kosmos 1044
- Kosmos 1060
- Kosmos 1061
- Kosmos 1070
- Zenit 2M-95
- Kosmos 1090
- Kosmos 1102
- Kosmos 1106
- Kosmos 1118
- Kosmos 1122

=== Zenit 4 ===
Unlike Zenit 2, little information on Zenit 4 has been released. The Zenit 4 was intended for high-resolution photography and carried one camera of 3000 mm focal length as well as a 200 mm camera. The focal length of the main camera was greater than the diameter of the capsule so the camera made use of a mirror to fold the light path. The ground resolution is not publicly known but it is believed to have been 1–2 metre.

The Zenit 4 had a mass of 6300 kg — around 1800 kg more than the Zenit 2. So, instead of the Vostok rocket, it was launched by the heavier Voskhod rocket. A total of 76 Zenit-4 satellites were flown between 1963 and 1970.

- Kosmos 22
- Kosmos 30
- Kosmos 34
- Kosmos 45
- Kosmos 59
- Kosmos 65
- Kosmos 67
- Kosmos 69
- Kosmos 77
- Kosmos 79
- Kosmos 85
- Kosmos 91
- Kosmos 92
- Kosmos 94
- Kosmos 109
- Kosmos 113
- Kosmos 114
- Zenit 4-18
- Kosmos 121
- Kosmos 126
- Kosmos 127
- Kosmos 128
- Kosmos 130
- Kosmos 131
- Kosmos 134
- Kosmos 141
- Kosmos 150
- Kosmos 155
- Kosmos 161
- Kosmos 162
- Zenit 4-31
- Zenit 4-32
- Kosmos 172
- Kosmos 175
- Kosmos 182
- Kosmos 190
- Kosmos 194
- Kosmos 201
- Kosmos 207
- Kosmos 214
- Kosmos 224
- Kosmos 227
- Kosmos 229
- Kosmos 232
- Kosmos 234
- Kosmos 237
- Kosmos 239
- Kosmos 241
- Kosmos 246
- Kosmos 254
- Kosmos 267
- Kosmos 270
- Kosmos 271
- Kosmos 274
- Kosmos 276
- Kosmos 279
- Kosmos 282
- Kosmos 284
- Kosmos 286
- Kosmos 288
- Kosmos 289
- Kosmos 294
- Kosmos 296
- Kosmos 297
- Kosmos 299
- Kosmos 302
- Kosmos 310
- Kosmos 322
- Kosmos 323
- Kosmos 331
- Kosmos 345
- Kosmos 346
- Kosmos 349
- Kosmos 352
- Zenit 4-75
- Kosmos 355

=== Zenit 4 M ===
An improved version of the Zenit 4, the Zenit 4M carried a new camera, solar panels, and a restartable engine so the satellite's orbit could be altered during the course of its mission. The mission duration was 13 days.

A total of 61 Zenit-4M satellites were launched between 1968 and 1974.

- Kosmos 251
- Kosmos 264
- Kosmos 280
- Kosmos 333
- Kosmos 360
- Kosmos 361
- Kosmos 370
- Kosmos 376
- Kosmos 386
- Kosmos 390
- Kosmos 396
- Kosmos 399
- Kosmos 401
- Kosmos 406
- Kosmos 420
- Kosmos 424
- Zenit 4M-17
- Kosmos 429
- Kosmos 430
- Kosmos 432
- Zenit 4M-21
- Kosmos 441
- Kosmos 442
- Kosmos 452
- Kosmos 454
- Kosmos 456
- Kosmos 463
- Kosmos 464
- Kosmos 466
- Kosmos 471
- Kosmos 474
- Kosmos 478
- Kosmos 483
- Kosmos 486
- Kosmos 491
- Kosmos 492
- Kosmos 495
- Kosmos 499
- Kosmos 503
- Kosmos 513
- Zenit 4M-41
- Kosmos 519
- Kosmos 522
- Kosmos 538
- Kosmos 543
- Kosmos 548
- Kosmos 551
- Kosmos 560
- Kosmos 563
- Kosmos 572
- Zenit 4M-51
- Kosmos 577
- Kosmos 579
- Kosmos 581
- Kosmos 584
- Kosmos 598
- Kosmos 600
- Kosmos 603
- Kosmos 609
- Kosmos 632
- Kosmos 667

=== Zenit 4 MK ===
These may have been versions of the Zenit 4 designed specifically to fly in lower orbits to improve image resolution. Some sources claim they were fitted with devices to compensate for aerodynamic drag and to withstand the effects of aerodynamic heating.

A total of 80 Zenit-4MK satellites were launched between 1969 and 1977.

- Kosmos 317
- Kosmos 328
- Kosmos 364
- Kosmos 383
- Kosmos 427
- Kosmos 438
- Kosmos 488
- Kosmos 515
- Kosmos 527
- Kosmos 550
- Kosmos 554
- Kosmos 556
- Kosmos 559
- Kosmos 587
- Kosmos 597
- Kosmos 602
- Kosmos 607
- Kosmos 612
- Kosmos 625
- Kosmos 630
- Kosmos 636
- Kosmos 639
- Zenit 4MK-23
- Kosmos 649
- Kosmos 652
- Kosmos 657
- Kosmos 659
- Kosmos 666
- Kosmos 671
- Kosmos 674
- Kosmos 688
- Kosmos 691
- Kosmos 694
- Kosmos 701
- Kosmos 704
- Kosmos 709
- Kosmos 710
- Kosmos 719
- Kosmos 722
- Kosmos 727
- Kosmos 730
- Kosmos 740
- Kosmos 742
- Kosmos 743
- Kosmos 746
- Kosmos 748
- Kosmos 753
- Kosmos 754
- Kosmos 757
- Kosmos 760
- Kosmos 774
- Kosmos 779
- Kosmos 786
- Kosmos 788
- Kosmos 802
- Kosmos 806
- Kosmos 810
- Kosmos 815
- Kosmos 817
- Kosmos 821
- Kosmos 824
- Kosmos 833
- Kosmos 835
- Kosmos 847
- Kosmos 852
- Kosmos 854
- Kosmos 857
- Kosmos 859
- Kosmos 863
- Kosmos 866
- Kosmos 884
- Kosmos 888
- Kosmos 892
- Zenit 4MK-74
- Kosmos 897
- Kosmos 902
- Kosmos 907
- Kosmos 908
- Kosmos 915
- Kosmos 920

=== Zenit 4 MKM ===
Intended to replace the 4MK design, the 4MKM may have been a low altitude variant of the later Zenit-6U and have similar equipment to it

Zenit-4MKM (Gerakl)
No.	Mission	Launch date (GMT)	Landing date	COSPAR ID	Orbit	Duration (in orbit)	Outcome
1	Kosmos 927	12 July 1977; 09:00	25 July 1977	1977-063A	153 x 361 km	13 days	Success
2	Kosmos 932	20 July 1977; 07:35	2 August 1977	1977-069A	150 x 358 km	13 days	Success
3	-	10 August 1977; 10:40	-	-	(Suborbital)	-	Failure
4	Kosmos 938	24 August 1977; 14:30	6 September 1977	1977-078A	181 x 340 km	13 days	Success
5	Kosmos 953	16 September 1977; 14:30	29 September 1977	1977-089A	180 x 330 km	13 days	Success
6	Kosmos 957	30 September 1977; 09:46	13 October 1977	1977-098A	171 x 361 km	13 days	Success
7	Kosmos 964	4 December 1977; 12:00	17 December 1977	1977-110A	171 x 362 km	13 days	Success
8	Kosmos 969	20 December 1977; 15:50	3 January 1978	1977-120A	180 x 317 km	14 days	Success
9	Kosmos 974	6 January 1978; 15:50	19 January 1978	1978-001A	178 x 334 km	13 days	Success
10	Kosmos 986	24 January 1978; 09:50	7 February 1978	1978-010A	172 x 318 km	14 days	Success
11	Kosmos 987	31 January 1978; 14:50	14 February 1978	1978-013A	189 x 322 km	14 days	Success
12	Kosmos 989	14 February 1978; 09:30	28 February 1978	1978-017A	169 x 318 km	14 days	Success
13	Kosmos 993	10 March 1978; 10:42	23 March 1978	1978-027A	190 x 325 km	13 days	Success
14	Kosmos 999	30 March 1978; 07:50	12 April 1978	1978-033A	174 x 352 km	13 days	Success
15	Kosmos 1003	20 April 1978; 15:30	4 May 1978	1978-040A	178 x 328 km	14 days	Success
16	Kosmos 1007	16 May 1978; 10:40	28 May 1978	1978-048A	168 x 350 km	13 days	Success
17	Kosmos 1021	10 June 1978; 08:35	23 June 1978	1978-057A	173 x 313 km	13 days	Success
18	Kosmos 1022	12 June 1978; 10:30	25 June 1978	1978-059A	171 x 344 km	13 days	Success
19	Kosmos 1029	29 August 1978; 15:00	8 September 1978	1978-082A	194 x 316 km	10 days	Success
20	Kosmos 1031	9 September 1978; 15:00	22 September 1978	1978-085A	182 x 329 km	13 days	Success
21	Kosmos 1042	6 October 1978; 15:30	19 October 1978	1978-092A	179 x 299 km	13 days	Success
22	Kosmos 1047	15 November 1978; 11:45	28 November 1978	1978-104A	171 x 354 km	13 days	Success
23	Kosmos 1049	21 November 1978; 12:00	4 December 1978	1978-107A	169 x 338 km	13 days	Success
24	Kosmos 1059	7 December 1978; 15:30	20 December 1978	1978-110A	180 x 338 km	13 days	Success
25	Kosmos 1068	26 December 1978; 15:30	8 January 1979	1978-123A	191 x 389 km	13 days	Success
26	Kosmos 1071	13 January 1979; 15:30	26 January 1979	1979-002A	179 x 339 km	13 days	Success
27	Kosmos 1073	30 January 1979; 15:15	12 February 1979	1979-006A	182 x 328 km	13 days	Success
28	Kosmos 1078	22 February 1979; 12:10	2 March 1979	1979-016A	168 x 280 km	8 days	Success
29	Kosmos 1080	14 March 1979; 10:50	28 March 1979	1979-023A	169 x 294 km	14 days	Success
30	Kosmos 1098	15 May 1979; 11:40	28 May 1979	1979-040A	170 x 354 km	13 days	Success
31	Kosmos 1113	10 July 1979; 09:00	23 July 1979	1979-064A	173 x 330 km	13 days	Success
32	Kosmos 1117	25 July 1979; 15:20	7 August 1979	1979-068A	177 x 325 km	13 days	Success
33	Kosmos 1120	11 August 1979; 09:15	24 August 1979	1979-073A	170 x 362 km	13 days	Success
34	Kosmos 1128	14 September 1979; 15:30	27 September 1979	1979-081A	173 x 328 km	13 days	Success
35	Kosmos 1148	28 December 1979; 13:00	10 January 1980	1979-106A	170 x 340 km	13 days	Success
36	Kosmos 1165	21 February 1980; 12:00	5 March 1980	1980-017A	170 x 350 km	13 days	Success
37	Kosmos 1170	1 April 1980; 08:00	12 April 1980	1980-025A	178 x 379 km	11 days	Success
38	Kosmos 1173	17 April 1980; 08:30	28 April 1980	1980-029A	174 x 352 km	11 days	Success
39	Kosmos 1214	10 October 1980; 13:10	23 October 1980	1980-082A	170 x 347 km	13 days	Success

=== Zenit 4 MKT ===
Another variant of the Zenit-4 design equipped with a Priroda-3 camera, intended for the investigation of natural resources in the interests of the Soviet economy and international cooperation.

Zenit-4MT (Fram)
No.	Mission	Launch date (GMT)	Landing date	COSPAR ID	Orbit	Duration (in orbit)	Outcome
1	Kosmos 771	25 September 1975; 09:50	8 October 1975	1975-090A	203 x 219 km	13 days	Success
2	Kosmos 820	21 May 1976; 07:00	2 June 1976	1976-046A	209 x 217 km	12 days	Success
3	-	4 October 1976; 11:00	-	-	(Suborbital)	-	Failure
4	Kosmos 912	26 May 1977; 07:00	8 June 1977	1977-040A	217 x 225 km	13 days	Success
5	Kosmos 948	2 September 1977; 09:00	15 Sept 1977	1977-083A	217 x 235 km	13 days	Success
6	Kosmos 1010	23 May 1978; 07:30	5 June 1978	1978-052A	217 x 230 km	13 days	Success
7	Kosmos 1033	3 October 1978; 11:00	16 October 1978	1978-089A	212 x 231 km	13 days	Success
8	Kosmos 1099	17 May 1979; 07:10	30 May 1979	1979-041A	215 x 247 km	13 days	Success
9	Kosmos 1105	8 June 1979; 07:10	21 June 1979	1979-052A	212 x 254 km	13 days	Success
10	Kosmos 1108	22 June 1979; 07:00	5 July 1979	1979-041A	214 x 245 km	13 days	Success
11	Kosmos 1115	13 July 1979; 08:25	26 July 1979	1979-066A	217 x 235 km	13 days	Success
12	Kosmos 1123	21 August 1979; 11:10	3 September 1979	1979-076A	211 x 236 km	13 days	Success
13	Kosmos 1182	23 May 1980; 07:10	5 June 1980	1980-040A	211 x 251 km	13 days	Success
14	Kosmos 1201	15 July 1980; 07:30	28 July 1980	1980-061A	213 x 243 km	13 days	Success
15	Kosmos 1207	22 August 1980; 10:00	4 September 1980	1980-070A	211 x 256 km	13 days	Success
16	Kosmos 1212	26 September 1980; 10:10	9 October 1980	1980-078A	205 x 244 km	13 days	Success
17	Kosmos 1273	22 May 1981; 07:10	5 June 1981	1981-040A	205 x 258 km	13 days	Success
18	Kosmos 1276	16 June 1981; 07:00	29 June 1981	1981-055A	211 x 233 km	13 days	Success
19	Kosmos 1314	9 October 1981; 10:40	22 October 1981	1981-101A	209 x 223 km	13 days	Success
20	Kosmos 1353	23 April 1982; 09:40	6 May 1982	1982-036A	207 x 238 km	13 days	Success
21	Kosmos 1387	13 July 1982; 08:00	26 July 1982	1982-071A	201 x 229 km	13 days	Success
22	Kosmos 1406	8 September 1982; 10:20	21 September 1982	1982-089A	207 x 238 km	13 days	Success
23	Kosmos 1458	28 April 1983; 08:30	11 May 1983	1983-040A	207 x 238 km	13 days	Success
24	Kosmos 1495	3 September 1983; 10:15	16 September 1983	1983-092A	205 x 221 km	13 days	Success
25	Kosmos 1557	22 May 1984; 08:30	4 June 1984	1984-048A	208 x 245 km	13 days	Success
26	Kosmos 1597	13 September 1984; 10:25	26 September 1984	1984-099A	208 x 241 km	13 days	Success
27	Kosmos 1681	6 September 1985; 08:30	19 September 1985	1985-080A	206 x 225 km	13 days	Success

=== Zenit 4 MT ===
A special version of the Zenit 4M intended for topographical photography. It carried an SA-106 topographic camera, a laser altimeter and Doppler apparatus.

Zenit-4MT (Orion)
No.	Mission	Launch date (GMT)	Landing date	COSPAR ID	Orbit	Duration (in orbit)	Outcome
1	Kosmos 470	27 December 1971; 14:04	6 January 1972	1971-118A	192 x 259 km	10 days	Success
2	Kosmos 502	13 July 1972; 14:30	25 July 1972	1972-055A	203 x 262 km	12 days	Success
3	Kosmos 541	27 December 1972; 10:30	8 January 1973	1972-105A	218 x 348 km	12 days	Success
4	Kosmos 576	27 June 1973; 11:50	9 July 1973	1973-044A	204 x 332 km	12 days	Success
5	Kosmos 616	17 December 1973; 12:00	28 December 1973	1973-102A	206 x 332 km	11 days	Success
6	Kosmos 664	29 June 1974; 12:50	11 July 1974	1974-049A	205 x 341 km	12 days	Success
7	Kosmos 693	4 November 1974; 10:40	16 November 1974	1974-088A	219 x 243 km	12 days	Success
8	Kosmos 720	21 March 1975; 06:50	1 April 1975	1975-019A	212 x 273 km	11 days	Success
9	Kosmos 759	12 September 1975; 05:30	23 September 1975	1975-084A	231 x 276 km	11 days	Success
10	Kosmos 811	31 March 1976; 12:50	12 April 1976	1976-030A	206 x 338 km	12 days	Success
11	Kosmos 855	21 September 1976; 11:40	3 October 1976	1976-095A	221 x 321 km	12 days	Success
12	Kosmos 916	10 June 1977; 08:00	21 June 1977	1977-046A	255 x 304 km	11 days	Success
13	Kosmos 988	8 February 1978; 12:15	20 February 1978	1978-015A	201 x 335 km	12 days	Success
14	Kosmos 1046	1 November 1978; 12:00	13 November 1978	1978-102A	202 x 324 km	12 days	Success
15	Kosmos 1069	28 December 1978; 16:30	10 January 1979	1978-124A	254 x 289 km	13 days	Success
16	Kosmos 1119	3 August 1979; 10:45	15 August 1979	1979-071A	213 x 245 km	12 days	Success
17	Kosmos 1139	5 October 1979; 11:30	18 October 1979	1979-088A	199 x 329 km	13 days	Success
18	Kosmos 1180	15 May 1980; 05:35	26 May 1980	1980-038A	245 x 279 km	11 days	Success
19	Kosmos 1211	23 September 1980; 10:30	4 October 1980	1980-077A	211 x 236 km	11 days	Success
20	Kosmos 1239	16 January 1981; 12:00	28 January 1981	1981-004A	210 x 231 km	12 days	Success
21	Kosmos 1309	18 September 1981; 09:30	1 October 1981	1981-092A	212 x 257 km	13 days	Success
22	Kosmos 1332	12 January 1982; 12:30	25 January 1982	1982-002A	207 x 251 km	13 days	Success
23	Kosmos 1398	3 August 1982; 11:30	13 August 1982	1982-077A	211 x 231 km	10 days	Success

=== Zenit 6U ===
A "universal" version of the Zenit, intended for both low-altitude, high-resolution missions and higher-altitude, general observation missions. All flights used the Soyuz launch vehicle. There were a total of 97 Zenit-6U satellites launched between 1976 and 1984.

- Kosmos 867
- Kosmos 896
- Kosmos 934
- Kosmos 958
- Kosmos 1050
- Kosmos 1095
- Kosmos 1103
- Kosmos 1107
- Kosmos 1111
- Kosmos 1126
- Kosmos 1138
- Zenit 6U-12
- Kosmos 1142
- Kosmos 1147
- Kosmos 1149
- Kosmos 1155
- Kosmos 1166
- Kosmos 1178
- Kosmos 1183
- Kosmos 1187
- Kosmos 1189
- Kosmos 1200
- Kosmos 1202
- Kosmos 1205
- Kosmos 1210
- Kosmos 1213
- Kosmos 1216
- Kosmos 1219
- Kosmos 1221
- Kosmos 1224
- Kosmos 1227
- Kosmos 1237
- Kosmos 1245
- Kosmos 1259
- Kosmos 1262
- Kosmos 1264
- Kosmos 1265
- Kosmos 1268
- Kosmos 1272
- Kosmos 1277
- Kosmos 1279
- Kosmos 1281
- Kosmos 1283
- Kosmos 1284
- Kosmos 1297
- Kosmos 1303
- Kosmos 1307
- Kosmos 1313
- Kosmos 1316
- Kosmos 1319
- Kosmos 1329
- Kosmos 1334
- Kosmos 1338
- Kosmos 1342
- Kosmos 1343
- Kosmos 1352
- Zenit 6U-57
- Kosmos 1368
- Kosmos 1373
- Zenit 6U-60
- Kosmos 1381
- Kosmos 1385
- Kosmos 1396
- Kosmos 1403
- Kosmos 1404
- Kosmos 1411
- Kosmos 1416
- Kosmos 1419
- Kosmos 1421
- Kosmos 1422
- Kosmos 1425
- Kosmos 1438
- Kosmos 1444
- Kosmos 1446
- Kosmos 1449
- Kosmos 1451
- Kosmos 1460
- Kosmos 1467
- Kosmos 1469
- Kosmos 1472
- Kosmos 1482
- Kosmos 1485
- Kosmos 1488
- Kosmos 1493
- Kosmos 1497
- Kosmos 1499
- Kosmos 1505
- Kosmos 1509
- Kosmos 1512
- Kosmos 1530
- Kosmos 1533
- Kosmos 1542
- Kosmos 1545
- Kosmos 1549
- Kosmos 1551
- Kosmos 1568
- Kosmos 1573

=== Zenit 8 ===
This was intended for military cartographic photography. It used a Soyuz launch vehicle and launches took place from both Baikonur and Plesetsk. It had a 15-day orbital life. Similar satellites were referred to using the "Resurs-DK No.1" designation.

A total of 102 Zenit-8 satellites were launched between 1984 and 1994, in addition to one sent into a suborbital trajectory during the maiden flight of the Soyuz-2 rocket in 2004.

- Kosmos 1571
- Kosmos 1580
- Kosmos 1583
- Kosmos 1584
- Kosmos 1587
- Kosmos 1592
- Kosmos 1600
- Kosmos 1609
- Kosmos 1613
- Kosmos 1623
- Kosmos 1628
- Kosmos 1632
- Kosmos 1644
- Kosmos 1648
- Kosmos 1649
- Kosmos 1659
- Kosmos 1664
- Kosmos 1665
- Kosmos 1668
- Kosmos 1671
- Kosmos 1683
- Kosmos 1685
- Kosmos 1696
- Kosmos 1702
- Kosmos 1705
- Kosmos 1715
- Kosmos 1728
- Kosmos 1730
- Zenit 8-29
- Kosmos 1740
- Kosmos 1742
- Kosmos 1747
- Kosmos 1757
- Kosmos 1760
- Kosmos 1765
- Kosmos 1772
- Kosmos 1775
- Kosmos 1781
- Kosmos 1787
- Kosmos 1790
- Kosmos 1804
- Kosmos 1813
- Kosmos 1819
- Kosmos 1822
- Kosmos 1826
- Kosmos 1837
- Kosmos 1843
- Kosmos 1845
- Kosmos 1848
- Kosmos 1863
- Kosmos 1872
- Kosmos 1874
- Kosmos 1889
- Kosmos 1895
- Kosmos 1899
- Kosmos 1905
- Kosmos 1907
- Kosmos 1915
- Kosmos 1921
- Kosmos 1923
- Kosmos 1938
- Kosmos 1941
- Kosmos 1945
- Kosmos 1952
- Kosmos 1956
- Kosmos 1962
- Kosmos 1964
- Kosmos 1967
- Kosmos 1973
- Kosmos 1976
- Kosmos 1978
- Kosmos 1981
- Kosmos 1982
- Kosmos 1983
- Kosmos 1991
- Kosmos 2000
- Kosmos 2003
- Kosmos 2006
- Kosmos 2017
- Kosmos 2019
- Kosmos 2025
- Kosmos 2028
- Kosmos 2029
- Kosmos 2032
- Kosmos 2035
- Kosmos 2036
- Kosmos 2045
- Kosmos 2048
- Kosmos 2055
- Kosmos 2062
- Kosmos 2073
- Kosmos 2083
- Kosmos 2086
- Kosmos 2099
- Kosmos 2104
- Kosmos 2120
- Kosmos 2121
- Kosmos 2136
- Kosmos 2152
- Kosmos 2207
- Kosmos 2260
- Kosmos 2281
- Zenit 8-103

== Foreign assessment ==
By the late 1960s, American intelligence was not only able to distinguish between reconnaissance Kosmos missions and other satellites launched under the Kosmos label, but also which launch complex they lifted off from (Plesetsk Cosmodrome or Baikonur Cosmodrome), and even when the film capsules were deorbited for recovery. Given the increase in spy satellite launch tempo that preceded and succeeded the major clashes during the 1969 Sino-Soviet border conflict, it was suggested that the pace of surveillance missions could indicate when Sino-Soviet tensions were elevated.

== In popular culture ==
A Zenit satellite was mentioned in the movie Mission: Impossible – Dead Reckoning Part One.
