= Vostok-2 (rocket) =

Soviet rocket

Vostok-2 (8A92)
- Vostok-2 rocket
- Function: Small-lift launch vehicle
- Manufacturer: OKB-1
- Country of origin: Soviet Union

Size
- Stages: 3

Capacity

Payload to LEO
- Mass: 4,730 kg (10,430 lb)

Associated rockets
- Family: R-7
- Derivative work: Vostok-2M

Launch history
- Status: Retired
- Launch sites: Baikonur, Sites 1/5 & 31/6; Plesetsk, Site 41/1
- Total launches: 45
- Success(es): 38
- Failure: 5
- Partial failure: 2
- First flight: 1 June 1962
- Last flight: 12 May 1967
- Carries passengers or cargo: Zenit

Boosters (First stage) – Block B, V, G & D (Note: This is a transliteration of the second through fifth letters of the Cyrillic alphabet (Б, В, Г, Д). A sense-for-sense translation would correspond to the second through fifth letters of the Latin alphabet, 'Block B, C, D & E'.)
- No. boosters: 4
- Powered by: 1 × RD-107-8D74K
- Maximum thrust: 995.3 kN (223,800 lb_{f})
- Total thrust: 3,981.2 kN (895,000 lb_{f})
- Burn time: 118 seconds
- Propellant: LOX / RP-1

Second stage (core) – Block A
- Powered by: 1 × RD-108-8D75K
- Maximum thrust: 940 kN (210,000 lb_{f})
- Burn time: 301 seconds
- Propellant: LOX / RP-1

Third stage
- Powered by: 1 × RD-0109
- Maximum thrust: 54.5 kN (12,300 lb_{f})
- Specific impulse: 326 s (3.20 km/s)
- Burn time: 365 seconds
- Propellant: LOX / RP-1

Vostok-2 (Russian: Восток-2, lit. 'East-2', GRAU index: 8A92) was an expendable carrier rocket used by the Soviet Union between 1962 and 1967. Forty five were launched, of which five failed. It was derived from the earlier Vostok-K, with uprated engines. It was a member of the Vostok family of rockets.

The Vostok-2 switched to the newer 8K74 core and featured the 8D74K first stage engines from the Molniya 8K78 booster which gave it improved performance over the older Vostok 8K72K.

The Vostok-2 made its maiden flight on 1 June 1962, from Site 1/5 at the Baikonur Cosmodrome. One of the booster engines shut down 1.8 seconds after launch, and the rocket came down 300 metres (980 ft) away from the pad. The resulting explosion damaged the launch complex, and necessitated delays to several other launches that had been scheduled from that complex, including Vostok 3 and Vostok 4. Thirteen months later, on 10 July 1963, an almost identical failure occurred. The other three failures were caused by a second stage malfunction, a second stage guidance problem, and a problem with the first stage.

The Vostok-2 was used exclusively to launch Zenit-2 reconnaissance satellites. Launches occurred from sites 1/5 and 31/6 at Baikonur, and Site 41/1 at Plesetsk. In 1967, it was retired in favour of the Voskhod due to the growing mass and complexity of the Zenit satellites.

== Launches ==
Vostok-2 was launched forty five times.

Vostok-2 8A92 launches
Date	Serial No.	Site	Payload	Result
1 June 1962	E15000-01	Baikonur LC-1/5	Kosmos (6) (Zenit-2 #3)	Failure
28 July 1962	T15000-07	Baikonur LC-1/5	Kosmos 7 (Sputnik 17) (Zenit-2 #4)	Success
27 September 1962	T15000-06	Baikonur LC-1/5	Kosmos 9 (Zenit-2 #5)	Success
17 October 1962	T15000-03	Baikonur LC-1/5	Kosmos 10 (Zenit-2 #6)	Success
22 December 1962	T15000-10	Baikonur LC-1/5	Kosmos 12 (Zenit-2 #7)	Success
21 March 1963	T15000-01	Baikonur LC-1/5	Kosmos 13 (Zenit-2 #8)	Success
22 April 1963	T15000-08	Baikonur LC-1/5	Kosmos 15 (Zenit-2 #9)	Success
28 April 1963	E15000-02	Baikonur LC-1/5	Kosmos 16 (Zenit-2 #10)	Success
24 May 1963	E15000-12	Baikonur LC-1/5	Kosmos 18 (Zenit-2 #11)	Success
10 July 1963	E15000-04	Baikonur LC-1/5	Kosmos (19b) (Zenit-2 #12)	Failure
18 October 1963	G15001-01	Baikonur LC-1/5	Kosmos 20 (Zenit-2 #13)	Success
28 November 1963	G15001-02	Baikonur LC-1/5	Kosmos (23) (Zenit-2 #14)	Failure
19 December 1963	G15001-03	Baikonur LC-1/5	Kosmos 24 (Zenit-2 #15)	Success
4 April 1964	G15001-04	Baikonur LC-31/6	Kosmos 28 (Zenit-2 #16)	Success
25 April 1964	R15001-01	Baikonur LC-31/6	Kosmos 29 (Zenit-2 #17)	Success
10 June 1964	R15001-02	Baikonur LC-31/6	Kosmos 32 (Zenit-2 #18)	Success
23 June 1964	G15001-05	Baikonur LC-31/6	Kosmos 33 (Zenit-2 #19)	Success
15 July 1964	R15001-03	Baikonur LC-31/6	Kosmos 35 (Zenit-2 #20)	Success
14 August 1964	R15001-04	Baikonur LC-31/6	Kosmos 37 (Zenit-2 #21)	Success
24 September 1964	R15001-05	Baikonur LC-31/6	Kosmos 46 (Zenit-2 #22)	Success
14 October 1964	R15002-01	Baikonur LC-31/6	Kosmos 48 (Zenit-2 #23)	Success
28 October 1964	R15002-02	Baikonur LC-31/6	Kosmos 50 (Zenit-2 #24)	Success
11 January 1965	R15002-03	Baikonur LC-31/6	Kosmos 52 (Zenit-2 #25)	Success
25 March 1965	G15001-06	Baikonur LC-31/6	Kosmos 64 (Zenit-2 #26)	Success
7 May 1965	R15002-04	Baikonur LC-31/6	Kosmos 66 (Zenit-2 #27)	Success
15 June 1965	U15001-01	Baikonur LC-31/6	Kosmos 68 (Zenit-2 #28)	Success
13 July 1965	R15002-05	Baikonur LC-31/6	Kosmos (71) (Zenit-2 #29)	Failure
14 August 1965	U15001-02	Baikonur LC-31/6	Kosmos 78 (Zenit-2 #30)	Success
27 November 1965	U15001-05	Baikonur LC-31/6	Kosmos 98 (Zenit-2 #31)	Success
10 December 1965	U15001-04	Baikonur LC-31/6	Kosmos 99 (Zenit-2 #32)	Success
7 January 1966	U15001-08	Baikonur LC-31/6	Kosmos 104 (Zenit-2 #33)	Partial Failure
22 January 1966	U15001-10	Baikonur LC-31/6	Kosmos 105 (Zenit-2 #34)	Success
10 February 1966	U15001-06	Baikonur LC-31/6	Kosmos 107 (Zenit-2 #35)	Success
17 March 1966	U15001-09	Plesetsk LC-41/1	Kosmos 112 (Zenit-2 #36)	Success
20 April 1966	U15001-07	Baikonur LC-31/6	Kosmos 115 (Zenit-2 #37)	Success
6 May 1966	N15001-01	Baikonur LC-31/6	Kosmos 117 (Zenit-2 #38)	Success
16 September 1966	N15001-02	Baikonur LC-31/6	Kosmos (129) (Zenit-2 #41)	Failure
14 October 1966	U15001-05	Plesetsk LC-41/1	Kosmos 129 (Zenit-2 #42)	Success
19 November 1966	N15001-08	Baikonur LC-31/6	Kosmos 132 (Zenit-2 #43)	Success
19 December 1966	N15001-09	Plesetsk LC-41/1	Kosmos 136 (Zenit-2 #44)	Success
19 January 1967	N15001-05	Plesetsk LC-41/1	Kosmos 138 (Zenit-2 #45)	Success
27 February 1967	U15001-03	Baikonur LC-1/5	Kosmos 143 (Zenit-2 #46)	Partial Failure
13 March 1967	N15001-06	Plesetsk LC-41/1	Kosmos 147 (Zenit-2 #47)	Success
4 April 1967	Ya15001-06	Plesetsk LC-41/1	Kosmos 153 (Zenit-2 #48)	Success
12 May 1967	Ya15001-02	Baikonur LC-1/5	Kosmos 157 (Zenit-2 #49)	Success
