= 1966 in spaceflight =

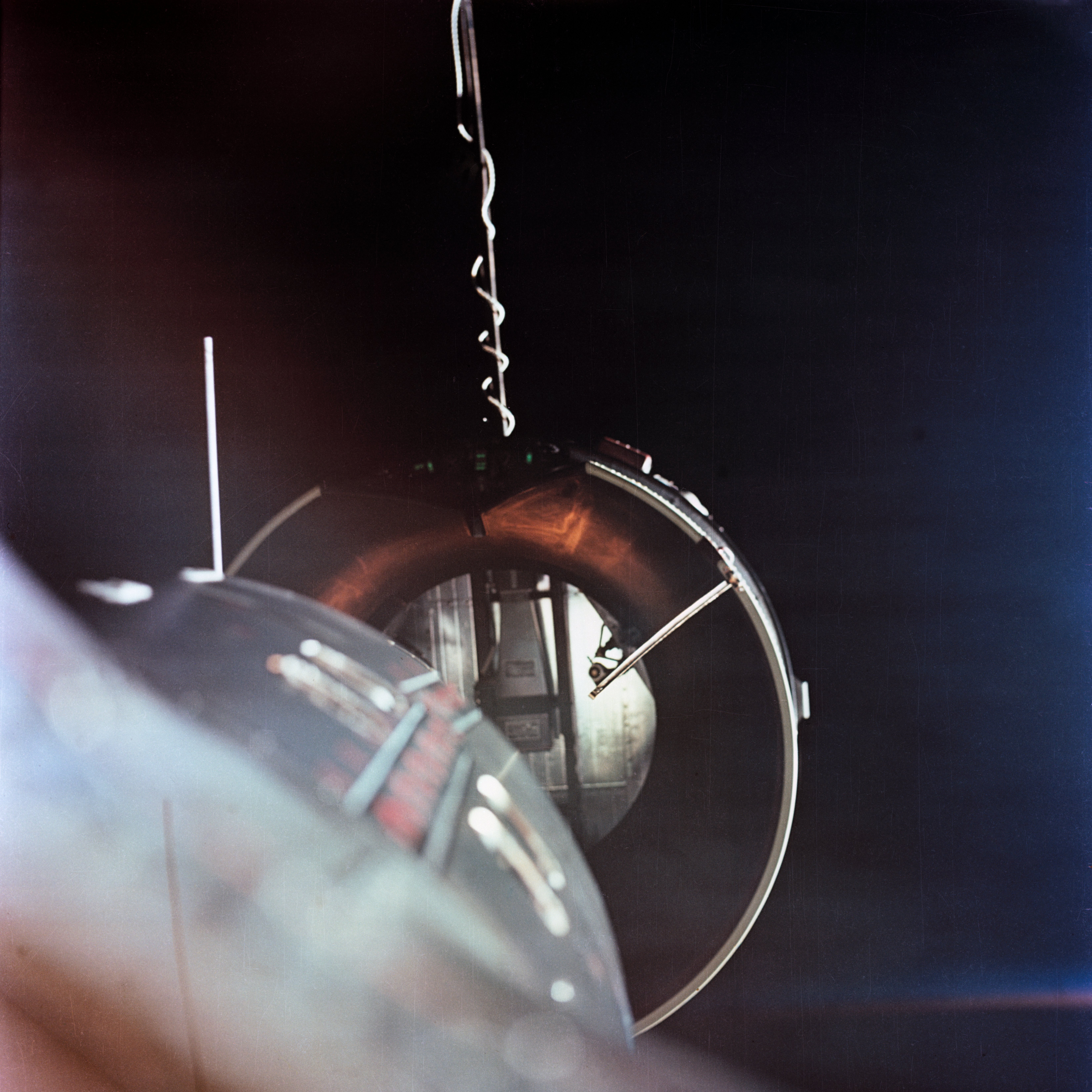
- Gemini 8 about to dock with its Agena target vehicle, the first time two spacecraft dock in orbit.

Orbital launches
- First: 7 January
- Last: 29 December
- Total: 131
- Successes: 111
- Failures: 13
- Partial failures: 7
- Catalogued: 118

Crewed flights
- Orbital: 5
- Total travellers: 10

1966 in spaceflight

The year 1966 saw the peak and the end of the Gemini program. The program proved that docking in space and human EVA's could be done safely. It saw the first launch of the Saturn IB rocket, an important step in the Apollo program, and the launch of Luna 9, the first spacecraft to make a soft landing on a celestial object (the Moon).

== Orbital launches ==
- ← Jan
- Feb
- Mar
- Apr
- May
- Jun
- Jul
- Aug
- Sep
- Oct
- Nov
- Dec →

Date and time (UTC)	Rocket	Flight number	Launch site		LSP	
Date and time (UTC)	Payload (⚀ = CubeSat)	Operator	Orbit	Function	Decay (UTC)	Outcome
Date and time (UTC)	Remarks					
=== January ===
7 January; 04:48:23	(United States) Thor-Burner 1		(United States) Vandenberg LC-75-2-6		(United States) USAF	
7 January; 04:48:23	(United States) OPS 2394 (DMSP 4A-F5)	USAF	Planned: Low Earth	Meteorology	7 January	Launch failure
7 January; 04:48:23	Second stage failed to ignite					
7 January; 08:24	(Soviet Union) Vostok-2		(Soviet Union) Baikonur LC-31/6		(Soviet Union)	
7 January; 08:24	(Soviet Union) Kosmos 104 (Zenit-2)		Low Earth	Optical reconnaissance	15 January	Partial Failure
7 January; 08:24	Third stage failed to put spacecraft in correct orbit					
19 January; 20:10	(United States) Atlas-SLV3 Agena-D		(United States) Vandenberg PALC-2-4		(United States) USAF	
19 January; 20:10	(United States) KH-7 24 (KH-7 Gambit)	NRO	Low Earth	Optical Reconnaissance	???	Successful
19 January; 20:10	(United States) OPS 3179 (Agena Pickaback)		Low Earth	Technology	23 January 1966	Successful
19 January; 20:10	(United States) OPS 7253		Low Earth	Film return	25 January 1966	Successful
22 January; 08:38	(Soviet Union) Vostok-2		(Soviet Union) Baikonur LC-31/6		(Soviet Union)	
22 January; 08:38	(Soviet Union) Kosmos 105 (Zenit-2)		Low Earth	Optical reconnaissance	30 January	Successful
25 January; 12:28	(Soviet Union) Kosmos-2I		(Soviet Union) Kapustin Yar LC-86/1		(Soviet Union)	
25 January; 12:28	(Soviet Union) Kosmos 106 (DS-P1-I)		Low Earth	Radar calibration	In orbit	Successful
28 January; 17:06:00	(United States) Scout-A		(United States) Vandenberg PALC-D		(United States)	
28 January; 17:06:00	(United States) OPS 1593 (Transit-O 7)		Low Earth	Navigation	In orbit	Successful
31 January; 11:41:37	(Soviet Union) Molniya-M		(Soviet Union) Baikonur LC-31/6		(Soviet Union)	
31 January; 11:41:37	(Soviet Union) Luna 9		Lunar transfer	Lunar lander	3 February; 18:45	Successful
31 January; 11:41:37	First spacecraft to soft land on the surface of the Moon and of any planetary object.					
=== February ===
2 February; 21:32:13	(United States) Thor-SLV2A Agena-D		(United States) Vandenberg PALC-1-1		(United States)	
2 February; 21:32:13	(United States) OPS 7291 (KH-4A Corona 1029)	NRO	Low Earth	Optical Reconnaissance	27 February	Successful
3 February; 07:41:23	(United States) Delta C		(United States) Cape Canaveral LC-17A		(United States)	
3 February; 07:41:23	(United States) ESSA-1 (Tiros)	ESSA	Low Earth	Meteorology	In orbit	Successful
5 February; 12:19:49	(Soviet Union) R-36O		(Soviet Union) Baikonur Site 67/21		(Soviet Union) RVSN	
5 February; 12:19:49	(Soviet Union) OGCh #02L	RVSN	Suborbital	Missile test	5 February	Successful
5 February; 12:19:49	Maiden flight of R-36O, apogee: 200 kilometres (120 mi)					
9 February; 19:45:01	(United States) Thor-SLV2A Agena-D		(United States) Vandenberg LC-75-1-2		(United States)	
9 February; 19:45:01	(United States) OPS 1439 ("Heavy Ferret")	NRO	Low Earth	ELINT	In orbit	Successful
10 February; 08:52	(Soviet Union) Vostok-2		(Soviet Union) Baikonur LC-31/6		(Soviet Union)	
10 February; 08:52	(Soviet Union) Kosmos 107 (Zenit-2)		Low Earth	Optical reconnaissance	18 February	Successful
11 February; 18:00	(Soviet Union) Kosmos		(Soviet Union) Kapustin Yar LC-86/1		(Soviet Union)	
11 February; 18:00	(Soviet Union) Kosmos 108 (DS-U1-G)		Low Earth	Atmospheric research	In orbit	Successful
15 February; 20:32	(United States) Atlas-SLV3 Agena-D		(United States) Vandenberg PALC-2-4		(United States)	
15 February; 20:32	(United States) KH-7 25 (KH-7 Gambit)	NRO	Low Earth	Optical Reconnaissance	???	Successful
15 February; 20:32	(United States) OPS 1184		Low Earth	Film return	22 February 1966	Successful
15 February; 20:32	(United States) OPS 3011 (Bluebell 2 cylinder)		Low Earth	Radar calibration	17 February 1966	Successful
15 February; 20:32	(United States) OPS 3031 (Bluebell 2 sphere)		Low Earth	Radar calibration	22 February 1966	Successful
17 February; 08:33:36	(France) Diamant A		(Algeria) Hammaguira Brigitte		(France) Armée de Terre	
17 February; 08:33:36	(France) Dipason (D-1A)	Armée de Terre	Low Earth	Geodetic science	In orbit	Successful
19 February; 08:52	(Soviet Union) Voskhod		(Soviet Union) Baikonur LC-31/6		(Soviet Union)	
19 February; 08:52	(Soviet Union) Kosmos 109 (Zenit-4 #14L)		Low Earth	Optical reconnaissance	27 February	Successful
21 February	(Soviet Union) Kosmos (63S1)		(Soviet Union) Kapustin Yar LC-86/1		(Soviet Union)	
21 February	(Soviet Union) DS-K-40 No.2		Planned: Low Earth	ELINT	21 February	Failure
21 February	First stage failure at T+83 seconds					
22 February; 20:09:36	(Soviet Union) Voskhod		(Soviet Union) Baikonur LC-31/6		(Soviet Union)	
22 February; 20:09:36	(Soviet Union) Kosmos 110 (Voskhod)		Low Earth	Uncrewed spacecraft	16 March	Successful
26 February; 16:12:01	(United States) Saturn IB		(United States) Cape Canaveral LC-34		(United States) NASA	
26 February; 16:12:01	(United States) Apollo AS-201	NASA	Sub-orbital	Test spacecraft	26 February; 16:49:21	Successful
26 February; 16:12:01	First flight of the Apollo Spacecraft and launch vehicle					
28 February; 13:58:00	(United States) Delta E		(United States) Cape Canaveral LC-17B		(United States)	
28 February; 13:58:00	(United States) ESSA-2 (Tiros)	ESSA	Low Earth	Meteorology	In orbit	Successful
=== March ===
1 March; 11:03:49	(Soviet Union) Molniya 8K78M		(Soviet Union) Baikonur LC-31/6		(Soviet Union)	
1 March; 11:03:49	(Soviet Union) Kosmos 111 (Luna E-6S series)		Intended: Lunar transfer	Lunar orbiter	1 March	Launch failure
9 March; 22:02:03	(United States) Thor-SLV2A Agena-D		(United States) Vandenberg PALC-1-1		(United States)	
9 March; 22:02:03	(United States) OPS 3488 (KH-4A Corona 1030)	NRO	Low Earth	Optical Reconnaissance	29 March	Successful
16 March; 15:00:03	(United States) Atlas SLV-3 Agena-D		(United States) Cape Canaveral LC-14		(United States)	
16 March; 15:00:03	(United States) GATV 5003	US Air Force	Low Earth	Docking target	15 September 1967	Successful
16 March; 16:41:02	(United States) Titan II GLV		(United States) Cape Canaveral LC-19		(United States) US Air Force	
16 March; 16:41:02	(United States) Gemini VIII	NASA	Low Earth	Technology/Biological/Target	17 March; 03:22:28	Successful
16 March; 16:41:02	First docking with the Agena target vehicle					
17 March; 10:28:42	(Soviet Union) Vostok-2		(Soviet Union) Plesetsk LC-41/1		(Soviet Union)	
17 March; 10:28:42	(Soviet Union) Kosmos 112 (Zenit-2)		Low Earth	Optical reconnaissance	25 March 1966; 05:31	Successful
18 March; 20:00	(United States) Atlas-SLV3 Agena-D		(United States) Vandenberg PALC-2-4		(United States)	
18 March; 20:00	(United States) KH-7 26 (KH-7 Gambit)	NRO	Low Earth	Optical Reconnaissance	???	Successful
18 March; 20:00	(United States) OPS 0879		Low Earth	Film return	23 March 1966	Successful
18 March; 20:00	(United States) OPS 0974		Low Earth	Film return	24 March 1966	Successful
21 March; 09:40	(Soviet Union) Voskhod 11A57		(Soviet Union) Baikonur LC-31/6		(Soviet Union)	
21 March; 09:40	(Soviet Union) Kosmos 113 (Zenit-4 #17L)		Low Earth	Optical reconnaissance	29 March	Successful
24 March; 14:39	(Soviet Union) UR-500 (Proton)		(Soviet Union) Baikonur Site 81/23		(Soviet Union)	
24 March; 14:39	(Soviet Union) Proton N-4 #3 (N-4 #3)		Intended: Low Earth	Physics	24 March	Launch failure
24 March; 14:39	2nd stage engine failure T+122 seconds. Suspected collision with the first stage following separation.					
26 March; 03:31:00	(United States) Scout-A		(United States) Vandenberg AFB Space Launch Complex 5 (PALC-D)		(United States)	
26 March; 03:31:00	(United States) Transit-O 8		Low Earth	Navigation	In orbit	Successful
27 March; 07:20	(Soviet Union) Molniya 8K78M		(Soviet Union) Baikonur LC-31/6		(Soviet Union)	
27 March; 07:20	(Soviet Union) Molniya-1 #5		Intended: Molniya	Communications technology	27 March	Launch failure
27 March; 07:20	Booster failure					
30 March; 09:20:12	(United States) SM-65D Atlas D		(United States) Vandenberg ABRES-B-3		(United States) US Air Force	
30 March; 09:20:12	(United States) OV1-4	US Air Force	Low Earth	REV test	In orbit	Successful
30 March; 09:20:12	(United States) OV1-5		Low Earth	REV test	In orbit	Successful
31 March; 05:41:04	(United States) Thor-Burner 1		(United States) Vandenberg LC-75-2-6		(United States) USAF	
31 March; 05:41:04	(United States) OPS 0340 (DMSP-Block-4A F6)	USAF	Low Earth	Meteorology	In orbit	Successful
31 March; 10:46:59	(Soviet Union) Molniya 8K78M		(Soviet Union) Baikonur LC-31/6		(Soviet Union)	
31 March; 10:46:59	(Soviet Union) Luna 10		Lunar transfer	Lunar orbiter	30 May (last contact)	Successful
31 March; 10:46:59	First Soviet lunar orbiter, first discoverer of lunar mascons; Last contact: 30 May 1966					
=== April ===
6 April; 11:40	(Soviet Union) Voskhod 11A57		(Soviet Union) Plesetsk LC-41/1		(Soviet Union)	
6 April; 11:40	(Soviet Union) Kosmos 114 (Zenit-4 #19L)		Low Earth	Optical reconnaissance	14 April	Successful
7 April; 22:02:55	(United States) Thor SLV-2A Agena D		(United States) Vandenberg PALC1-1		(United States)	
7 April; 22:02:55	(United States) OPS 1612 (KH-4 Corona 1031)	NRO	Low Earth	Optical Reconnaissance	26 April 1966	Successful
7 April; 22:02:55	(United States) SRV 1031-1		Low Earth	???	???	Successful
7 April; 22:02:55	(United States) SRV 1031-2		Low Earth	Film return	???	Successful
8 April; 01:00:02	(United States) Atlas LV-3C Centaur-D		(United States) Canaveral LC-36B		(United States) NASA	
8 April; 01:00:02	(United States) Atlas Centaur 8 Surveyor SM-2	NASA	Highly elliptical	Technology	14 April	Failure
8 April; 01:00:02	Launch vehicle development flight. It carried a mass model of the Surveyor spacecraft. The second Centaur engine firing was unsuccessful.					
8 April; 19:35:00	(United States) Atlas SLV-3 Agena-D		(United States) Cape Canaveral LC-12		(United States) US Air Force	
8 April; 19:35:00	(United States) OAO 1	NASA	Low Earth		In orbit	Spacecraft failure
19 April; 19:15	(United States) Atlas-SLV3 Agena-D		(United States) Vandenberg PALC-2-4		(United States)	
19 April; 19:15	(United States) KH-7 27 (KH-7 Gambit SV 977)	NRO	Low Earth	Optical Reconnaissance	26 April 1966	Successful
19 April; 19:15	(United States) OPS 0910		Low Earth	Film return	22 April 1966	Successful
20 April; 10:40	(Soviet Union) Vostok-2		(Soviet Union) Baikonur LC-31		(Soviet Union)	
20 April; 10:40	(Soviet Union) Kosmos 115 (Zenit-2 No. 35L)		Low Earth	Optical reconnaissance	28 April 1966	Successful
22 April; 09:45	(United States) Scout-B		(United States) Vandenberg PALC-D		(United States) US Air Force	
22 April; 09:45	(United States) OV3-1	USAF	Low Earth	Radiation belt particle and fields experiments	In orbit	Successful
25 April; 07:10	(Soviet Union) Molniya 8K78M		(Soviet Union) Baikonur LC-31		(Soviet Union)	
25 April; 07:10	(Soviet Union) Molniya-1 #6		Molniya	Communications technology	11 June 1973	Successful
25 April; 07:10	Third successful Molniya; also transmitted cloud cover images					
26 April; 10:04	(Soviet Union) Kosmos-2I		(Soviet Union) Kapustin Yar LC-86/1		(Soviet Union)	
26 April; 10:04	(Soviet Union) Kosmos 116 (DS-P1-Yu No. 6)		Low Earth	Radar calibration	In orbit	Successful
=== May ===
3 May; 19:25:25	(United States) Thor SLV-2A Agena D		(United States) Vandenberg 75-3-5		(United States)	
3 May; 19:25:25	(United States) OPS 1508 (KH-4A Corona 1032)	NRO	Low Earth	Optical Reconnaissance	3 May	Failure
3 May; 19:25:25	(United States) SRV 1032-1		Low Earth	Film return	3 May	Failure
3 May; 19:25:25	(United States) SRV 1032-2		Low Earth	Film return	3 May	Failure
6 May; 10:58	(Soviet Union) Vostok-2		(Soviet Union) Baikonur LC-31		(Soviet Union)	
6 May; 10:58	(Soviet Union) Kosmos 117 (Zenit-2 No. 39L)		Low Earth	Optical reconnaissance	14 May 1966	Successful
11 May; 14:10	(Soviet Union) Vostok-2M		(Soviet Union) Baikonur LC-31/6		(Soviet Union)	
11 May; 14:10	(Soviet Union) Kosmos 118 (Meteor #4L)		Low Earth	Weather	23 November 1988	Successful
14 May; 19:02	(United States) Atlas-SLV3 Agena-D		(United States) Vandenberg PALC-2-4		(United States)	
14 May; 19:02	(United States) KH-7 28 (KH-7 Gambit SV 978)	NRO	Low Earth	Optical Reconnaissance	27 October 1970	Successful
14 May; 19:02	(United States) OPS 1950		Low Earth	Film return	17 May 1966	Successful
14 May; 19:02	(United States) OPS 6785		Low Earth	Film return	21 May 1966	Successful
15 May; 07:55:34	(United States) Thor SLV-2 Agena-B		(United States) Vandenberg LC-75-1-1		(United States) US Air Force	
15 May; 07:55:34	(United States) Nimbus 2 (Nimbus C)	NASA	Low Earth	Weather; Technology	In orbit	Successful
17 May; 11:00	(Soviet Union) Voskhod 11A57		(Soviet Union) Plesetsk LC-41/1		(Soviet Union)	
17 May; 11:00	(Soviet Union) Unnamed Kosmos (Zenit-4 #18L)		Low Earth	Optical reconnaissance	17 May	Failure
17 May; 15:15:03	(United States) Atlas SLV-3 Agena-D		(United States) Cape Canaveral LC-14		(United States)	
17 May; 15:15:03	(United States) GATV 5004	US Air Force	Low Earth	Docking target	17 May	Launch failure
19 May; 02:27:00	(United States) Scout-A		(United States) Vandenberg AFB Space Launch Complex 5 (PALC-D)		(United States)	
19 May; 02:27:00	(United States) Transit-O 9		Low Earth	Navigation	In orbit	Successful
19 May; 19:30	(Soviet Union) R-36O		(Soviet Union) Baikonur Site 67/22		(Soviet Union) RVSN	
19 May; 19:30	(Soviet Union) OGCh #04L	RVSN	Suborbital	Missile test	19 May	Successful
24 May; 02:00:33	(United States) Thor SLV-2A Agena D		(United States) Vandenberg AFB Space Launch Complex 3 (PALC-1-1)		(United States)	
24 May; 02:00:33	(United States) OPS 1778 KH-4A Corona 1033	NRO	Low Earth	Optical Reconnaissance	9 June 1966	Successful
24 May; 02:00:33	(United States) SRV 1033-1		Low Earth	Film return	???	Successful
24 May; 02:00:33	(United States) SRV 1033-2		Low Earth	Film return	???	Successful
24 May; 05:31?	(Soviet Union) Kosmos-2I		(Soviet Union) Kapustin Yar LC-86/1		(Soviet Union)	
24 May; 05:31?	(Soviet Union) Kosmos 119 (DS-U2-I No. 1)		Low Earth	Ionospheric research	In orbit	Successful
25 May; 14:00	(United States) Thor Delta C1		(United States) Cape Canaveral LC-17B		(United States) US Air Force	
25 May; 14:00	(United States) Explorer 32 (AE-B)	NASA	Low Earth	Atmospheric	22 February 1985	Successful
30 May; 14:41:01	(United States) Atlas LV-3C Centaur-D	AC-10	(United States) Canaveral LC-36A		(United States) NASA	
30 May; 14:41:01	(United States) Surveyor 1	NASA	Translunar injection	Lunar lander	2 June 1966	Successful
30 May; 14:41:01	First American lunar soft-lander					
=== June ===
1 June; 15:00:02	(United States) Atlas SLV-3		(United States) Cape Canaveral LC-14		(United States)	
1 June; 15:00:02	(United States) ATDA No. 02186	US Air Force	Low Earth	Docking target	11 June	Spacecraft failure
1 June; 15:00:02	Shroud failed to come off target adapter precluding docking					
3 June; 13:39:33	(United States) Titan II GLV		(United States) Cape Canaveral LC-19		(United States) US Air Force	
3 June; 13:39:33	(United States) Gemini IX-A	NASA	Low Earth	Technology/Biological/Target	6 June; 02:00:23	Successful
3 June; 13:39:33	Failed attempt to dock with ATDA; two hour EVA by Eugene Cernan					
3 June; 19:25	(United States) Atlas-SLV3 Agena-D		(United States) Vandenberg PALC-2-4		(United States)	
3 June; 19:25	(United States) KH-7 29 (KH-7 Gambit SV 979)	NRO	Low Earth	Optical Reconnaissance	6 June	Successful
3 June; 19:25	(United States) OPS 1577		Low Earth	Film return	9 June	Successful
3 June; 19:25	(United States) OPS 1856		Low Earth	Film return	9 June	Successful
7 June; 02:48	(United States) Atlas-SLV3 Agena-B		(United States) Cape Canaveral LC-12		(United States) US Air Force	
7 June; 02:48	(United States) OGO-3 (OGO-B)	NASA	Low Earth	Ionospheric; Magnetospheric	14 September 1981	Successful
7 June; 02:48	Routine spacecraft operation was discontinued on 1 December 1969, after which only data from Heppner's experiment (E-11) was acquired. All spacecraft support terminated on 29 February 1972.					
8 June; 11:00	(Soviet Union) Voskhod 11A57		(Soviet Union) Baikonur LC-31		(Soviet Union)	
8 June; 11:00	(Soviet Union) Kosmos 120 (Zenit-2 No. 41L)		Low Earth	Optical reconnaissance	16 June	Successful
9 June; 20:15	(United States) Atlas-SLV3 Agena-D		(United States) Vandenberg PALC-1-2		(United States)	
9 June; 20:15	(United States) Midas 10 (Midas RTS-I F1)	USAF	Low Earth	Early Warning	3 December	Successful
9 June; 20:15	(United States) ERS 16 (ORS 2)		Low Earth	Technology (performed metal-to-metal bonding experiments)	12 March 1967	Successful
9 June; 20:15	(United States) SECOR 6 (Secor Type II S/N 7, EGRS VI)		Low Earth	Geodetic	6 July 1967	Successful
10 June; 04:15	(United States) Scout-B		(United States) Wallops Flight Facility Launch Area 3A		(United States) US Air Force	
10 June; 04:15	(United States) OV3-4 (Personnel Hazards Associated with Space Radiation (PHASR)), OPS-1427	USAF	Low Earth	Tissue equivalent radiation chamber, linear energy transfer spectrometer, electron and proton spectrometers, a solid state charged particle spectrometer and a tri-axial magnetometer.	In orbit	Successful
16 June; 14:01	(United States) Titan IIIC		(United States) Cape Canaveral LC-41		(United States)	
16 June; 14:01	(United States) GGTS	USAF	Geosynchronous	Gravity Gradient stabilization test	In orbit	Partial spacecraft failure
16 June; 14:01	(United States) IDCSP 1		Geosynchronous	Military communications	In orbit	Successful
16 June; 14:01	(United States) IDCSP 2		Geosynchronous	Military communications	In orbit	Successful
16 June; 14:01	(United States) IDCSP 3		Geosynchronous	Military communications	In orbit	Successful
16 June; 14:01	(United States) IDCSP 4		Geosynchronous	Military communications	In orbit	Successful
16 June; 14:01	(United States) IDCSP 5		Geosynchronous	Military communications	In orbit	Successful
16 June; 14:01	(United States) IDCSP 6		Geosynchronous	Military communications	In orbit	Successful
16 June; 14:01	(United States) IDCSP 7		Geosynchronous	Military communications	In orbit	Successful
16 June; 14:01	GGTS experiment partially failed because magnetic field in one of the dampers was compromised					
17 Jun; 11:00	(Soviet Union) Voskhod 11A57		(Soviet Union) Plesetsk LC-41/1		(Soviet Union)	
17 Jun; 11:00	(Soviet Union) Kosmos 121 (Zenit-4 #20L)		Low Earth	Optical reconnaissance	25 Jun	Successful
21 Jun; 21:23:30	(United States) Thor SLV-2A Agena D		(United States) Vandenberg 75-3-5		(United States)	
21 Jun; 21:23:30	(United States) OPS 1599 (KH-4A Corona 1034)	NRO	Low Earth	Optical Reconnaissance	14 July	Successful
21 Jun; 21:23:30	(United States) SRV 1034-1		Low Earth	Film return	Before 14 July	Successful
21 Jun; 21:23:30	(United States) SRV 1034-2		Low Earth	Film return	Before 14 July	Successful
24 Jun; 21:31:30	(United States) Thor-SLV2A Agena-D		(United States) Vandenberg LC-75-1-1		(United States)	
24 Jun; 21:31:30	(United States) PAGEOS	NASA	Low Earth	Geodetic	1975 - 2016	Successful
25 Jun; 10:30	(Soviet Union) Vostok-2M		(Soviet Union) Baikonur LC-31/6		(Soviet Union)	
25 Jun; 10:30	(Soviet Union) Kosmos 122 (Meteor #5L)		Low Earth	Weather	14 November 1989	Successful
=== July ===
1 Jul; 16:02:25	(United States) Thor Delta E1		(United States) Cape Canaveral LC-17A		(United States) US Air Force	
1 Jul; 16:02:25	(United States) Explorer 33 (AIMP D)	NASA	High Earth	Magnetospheric research	In orbit	Successful
5 July; 16:12:01	(United States) Saturn IB		(United States) Cape Canaveral LC-37B		(United States) NASA	
5 July; 16:12:01	(United States) Apollo AS-203	NASA	Low Earth	S-IVB test	5 July	Successful
5 July; 16:12:01	The spacecraft inadvertently destroyed after four orbits					
6 July; 12:57	(Soviet Union) UR-500 (Proton)		(Soviet Union) Baikonur Site 81/23		(Soviet Union)	
6 July; 12:57	(Soviet Union) Proton 3 (N-4 #4)		Low Earth	Cosmic rays and particles research	16 September	Successful
8 July; 05:31	(Soviet Union) Kosmos (63S1)		(Soviet Union) Kapustin Yar Site 86/1		(Soviet Union)	
8 July; 05:31	(Soviet Union) Kosmos 123 (DS-P1-Yu #5L)		Low Earth	Radar calibration	In orbit	Successful
12 July; 17:55	(United States) Atlas-SLV3 Agena-D		(United States) Vandenberg SLC 4E		(United States)	
12 July; 17:55	(United States) KH-7 30 (KH-7 Gambit SV 980)	NRO	Low Earth	Optical Reconnaissance	20 Jul 1966	Successful
12 July; 17:55	(United States) OPS 1850 SRV Mission 4030		Low Earth	Film return	July	Successful
14 July; 02:10:02	(United States) SM-65D Atlas		(United States) Vandenberg ABRES-B-3		(United States) US Air Force	
14 July; 02:10:02	(United States) OV1-8 (PasComSat)	USAF	Low Earth	Communications	4 Jan 1978	Successful
14 July; 02:10:02	(United States) OV1-7	USAF	Low Earth	X-Ray Astronomy/Ionosphere	14 July	Failed to orbit
14 July; 10:25	(Soviet Union) Voskhod 11A57		(Soviet Union) Baikonur LC-31		(Soviet Union)	
14 July; 10:25	(Soviet Union) Kosmos 124 (Zenit-2 No. 42L)		Low Earth	Optical reconnaissance	22 July	Successful
18 July; 20:39:46	(United States) Atlas-Agena		(United States) Cape Canaveral LC-14		(United States)	
18 July; 20:39:46	(United States) TDA-1A	US Air Force	Low Earth	Docking target	29 Dec	Successful
18 July; 22:20:27	(United States) Titan II GLV		(United States) Cape Canaveral LC-19		(United States) US Air Force	
18 July; 22:20:27	(United States) Gemini X	NASA	Low Earth	Technology/Biological/Target	21 July; 21:07:05	Successful
18 July; 22:20:27	Second successful docking with Agena target vehicle; First EVA to another spacecraft, by Michael Collins					
20 July; 08:58	(Soviet Union) Soyuz/Vostok		(Soviet Union) Baikonur LC-31		(Soviet Union)	
20 July; 08:58	(Soviet Union) Kosmos 125 (US-A) No. 111		Low Earth	ELINT	2 Aug 1966	Successful
28 Jul; 10:50	(Soviet Union) Voskhod 11A57		(Soviet Union) Baikonur LC-31		(Soviet Union)	
28 Jul; 10:50	(Soviet Union) Kosmos 126 (Zenit-4 #21L)		Low Earth	Optical reconnaissance	2 Aug	Successful
29 July; 18:30:20	(United States) Titan IIIB		(United States) Vandenberg AFB Space Launch Complex 4W		(United States)	
29 July; 18:30:20	(United States) KH-8 Gambit #1 (OPS 3014)	NRO	Low Earth	Optical Reconnaissance	6 Aug 1966	Successful
29 July; 18:30:20	(United States) SRV Mission 4301-1		Low Earth	Film return	before 6 Aug 1966	Successful
=== August ===
4 Aug; 10:45:01	(United States) Scout-B		(United States) Vandenberg Space Launch Complex 5		(United States) US Air Force	
4 Aug; 10:45:01	(United States) OV3-3	USAF	Low Earth	Radiation belt particle and fields experiments	In orbit	Successful
8 Aug; 11:29	(Soviet Union) Voskhod 11A57		(Soviet Union) Baikonur LC-31		(Soviet Union)	
8 Aug; 11:29	(Soviet Union) Kosmos 127 (Zenit-4 #22L)		Low Earth	Optical reconnaissance	16 Aug	Successful
9 Aug; 20:46:03	(United States) Thorad SLV-2G Agena D		(United States) Vandenberg Space Launch Complex 1W		(United States)	
9 Aug; 20:46:03	(United States) OPS 1545 CORONA J-32	NRO	Low Earth	Optical Reconnaissance	11 Sep	Successful
9 Aug; 20:46:03	(United States) SRV 715		Low Earth	Film return	Before 11 Sep	Successful
9 Aug; 20:46:03	(United States) SRV 716		Low Earth	Film return	Before 11 Sep	Successful
10 Aug; 19:26:00	(United States) Atlas SLV-3 Agena D		(United States) Cape Canaveral Launch Complex 13		(United States)	
10 Aug; 19:26:00	(United States) Lunar Orbiter 1		Lunar	Mapping	29 Oct 13:29	Successful
10 Aug; 19:26:00	First US spacecraft to orbit Moon. First spacecraft to photograph Earth from the Moon.					
16 Aug; 18:30	(United States) Atlas-SLV3 Agena-D		(United States) Vandenberg AFB Space Launch Complex 4E		(United States)	
16 Aug; 18:30	(United States) KH-7 31 (OPS 1832)	NRO	Low Earth	Optical Reconnaissance	24 Aug 1966	Successful
16 Aug; 18:30	(United States) SRV Mission 4031		Low Earth	Film return	before 24 Aug 1966	Successful
16 Aug; 18:30	(United States) SAMPAN 1	NRO	Low Earth	ELINT Reconnaissance	5 Mar 1970	Successful
16 Aug; 18:30	(United States) SOUSEA 1		Low Earth	ELINT Reconnaissance	5 Mar 1970	Successful
17 August; 15:20:17	(United States) Delta E1		(United States) Cape Canaveral LC-17A		(United States) NASA	
17 August; 15:20:17	(United States) Pioneer 7 (Pioneer B)	NASA	Heliocentric	Scientific	In orbit	Successful
18 Aug; 02:25:02	(United States) Scout-A		(United States) Vandenberg AFB Space Launch Complex 5 (PALC-D)		(United States)	
18 Aug; 02:25:02	(United States) Transit-O 10		Low Earth	Navigation	In orbit	Successful
19 Aug 1925	(United States) Atlas-SLV3 Agena-D		(United States) Vandenberg Space Launch Complex 3E		(United States)	
19 Aug 1925	(United States) Midas 11 (Midas RTS-I F2)	USAF	Low Earth	Early Warning	In orbit	Successful
19 Aug 1925	(United States) ERS 15		Low Earth	Technology (performed metal-to-metal bonding experiments)	12 March 1967	Successful
19 Aug 1925	(United States) SECOR 7 (Secor Type II S/N 8, EGRS VII)		Low Earth	Geodetic	In orbit	Successful
24 Aug; 08:03:21	(Soviet Union) Molniya-M / Blok-L		(Soviet Union) Baikonur LC-31/6		(Soviet Union)	
24 Aug; 08:03:21	(Soviet Union) Luna 11		Lunar transfer	Lunar orbiter	In orbit	Partial spacecraft failure
24 Aug; 08:03:21	TV camera failed to return usable images; Last contact: 1 October 1966					
25 Aug; 17:15:32	(United States) Saturn IB		(United States) Cape Canaveral LC-34		(United States) NASA	
25 Aug; 17:15:32	(United States) Apollo AS-202	NASA	Sub-orbital	Test spacecraft	25 Aug; 18:48:34	Successful
25 Aug; 17:15:32	Second flight of the Apollo Spacecraft and launch vehicle; resulted in man-rating of Block 1 Apollo and Saturn 1B rocket					
26 Aug; 13:59:56	(United States) Titan IIIC		(United States) Cape Canaveral LC-41		(United States)	
26 Aug; 13:59:56	(United States) IDCSP		Low Earth	Geosynchronous Communications	26 Aug	Launch failure
26 Aug; 13:59:56	(United States) IDCSP		Low Earth	Geosynchronous Communications	26 Aug	Launch failure
26 Aug; 13:59:56	(United States) IDCSP		Low Earth	Geosynchronous Communications	26 Aug	Launch failure
26 Aug; 13:59:56	(United States) IDCSP		Low Earth	Geosynchronous Communications	26 Aug	Launch failure
26 Aug; 13:59:56	(United States) IDCSP		Low Earth	Geosynchronous Communications	26 Aug	Launch failure
26 Aug; 13:59:56	(United States) IDCSP		Low Earth	Geosynchronous Communications	26 Aug	Launch failure
26 Aug; 13:59:56	(United States) IDCSP		Low Earth	Geosynchronous Communications	26 Aug	Launch failure
26 Aug; 13:59:56	(United States) IDCSP		Low Earth	Geosynchronous Communications	26 Aug	Launch failure
27 Aug; 09:50	(Soviet Union) Voskhod 11A57		(Soviet Union) Baikonur Cosmodrome		(Soviet Union)	
27 Aug; 09:50	(Soviet Union) Kosmos 128 (Zenit-4 #23L)		Low Earth	Optical reconnaissance	4 Sep	Successful
=== September ===
12 Sep; 13:05:02	(United States) Atlas SLV-3 Agena-D		(United States) Cape Canaveral LC-14		(United States)	
12 Sep; 13:05:02	(United States) GATV-5006	US Air Force	Low Earth	Docking target	30 Dec	Successful
12 Sep; 14:42:27	(United States) Titan II GLV		(United States) Cape Canaveral LC-19		(United States) US Air Force	
12 Sep; 14:42:27	(United States) Gemini XI	NASA	Low Earth	Technology/Biological/Target	15 Sep; 13:59:35	Successful
12 Sep; 14:42:27	First-ever direct-ascent (first orbit) rendezvous with an Agena Target Vehicle, highest apogee orbit for Earth-orbiting crewed mission to date.					
16 Sep; 09:30	(United States) Thor-Burner 2		(United States) Vandenberg LC-75-2-6		(United States) USAF	
16 Sep; 09:30	(United States) DMSP-Block-4A 7 (OPS 6026)	USAF	Low Earth	Meteorology	In orbit	Successful
16 Sep; 09:30	(Soviet Union) Voskhod 11A57		(Soviet Union) Baikonur Cosmodrome		(Soviet Union)	
16 Sep; 09:30	(Soviet Union) Unnamed Zenit-4 (Zenit-4 #40L)		Low Earth	Optical reconnaissance	16 Sep	Failure
16 Sep; 17:59	(United States) Atlas-SLV3 Agena-D		(United States) Vandenberg AFB Space Launch Complex 4E		(United States)	
16 Sep; 17:59	(United States) KH-7 32 (OPS 1686)	NRO	Low Earth	Optical Reconnaissance	23 Sep	Successful
16 Sep; 17:59	(United States) SRV Mission 4032		Low Earth	Film return	before 23 Sep	Successful
16 Sep; 17:59	(United States) FANION 2	NRO	Low Earth	ELINT Reconnaissance	9 May 1968	Successful
16 Sep; 17:59	(United States) TRIPOS 2		Low Earth	ELINT Reconnaissance	9 May 1968	Successful
17 Sep; 22:35	(Soviet Union) R-36O		(Soviet Union) Baikonur Cosmodrome Site 162/36		(Soviet Union) RVSN	
17 Sep; 22:35	(Soviet Union) OGCh #05L	RVSN	LEO	Missile test	11 Nov	Partial launch failure
17 Sep; 22:35	First attempted orbital Fractional Orbital Bombardment System test.					
20 Sep; 12:32:00	(United States) Atlas LV-3C Centaur-D		(United States) Canaveral LC-36A		(United States) NASA	
20 Sep; 12:32:00	(United States) Surveyor 2	NASA	Highly elliptical	Lunar Lander	23 Sep	Spacecraft failure
20 Sep; 12:32:00	Mid-course correction failure resulted in the spacecraft losing control. Contact was lost with the spacecraft at 9:35 UTC, 22 September.					
20 Sep; 21:14:05	(United States) Thor SLV-2A Agena D		(United States) Vandenberg Space Launch Complex 3W		(United States)	
20 Sep; 21:14:05	(United States) KH-4A Corona 1035 (OPS 1703)	NRO	Low Earth	Optical Reconnaissance	12 Oct	Successful
20 Sep; 21:14:05	(United States) SRV 1035-1		Low Earth	Film return	Before 12 Oct	Successful
20 Sep; 21:14:05	(United States) SRV 1035-2		Low Earth	Film return	Before 12 Oct	Successful
26 Sep; 02:58	(Japan) Lambda 4S		(Japan) Kagoshima Pad L		(Japan) JAXA	
26 Sep; 02:58	(Japan) L-4S-1	JAXA			26 Sep	Launch failure
28 Sep; 19:07	(United States) Titan IIIB		(United States) Vandenberg AFB Space Launch Complex 4W		(United States)	
28 Sep; 19:07	(United States) KH-8 Gambit #2 (OPS 4096)	NRO	Low Earth	Optical Reconnaissance	7 Oct	Successful
28 Sep; 19:07	(United States) SRV Mission 4302-1		Low Earth	Film return	before 7 Oct	Successful
=== October ===
2 October; 10:39:03	(United States) Delta E		(United States) Vandenberg SLC 2E		(United States)	
2 October; 10:39:03	(United States) ESSA-3 (Tiros)	ESSA	Low Earth	Meteorology	In orbit	Successful
5 Oct; 22:00	(United States) Atlas-SLV3 Agena-D		(United States) Vandenberg Vandenberg SLC 3E		(United States)	
5 Oct; 22:00	(United States) Midas 12 (Midas RTS-I F3)	USAF	Low Earth	Early Warning	In orbit	Successful
5 Oct; 22:00	(United States) EGRS VIII (SECOR Type II S/N 9 )		Low Earth	Geodetic	In orbit	Successful
12 Oct; 19:15	(United States) Atlas-SLV3 Agena-D		(United States) Vandenberg AFB Space Launch Complex 4E		(United States)	
12 Oct; 19:15	(United States) KH-7 33 (OPS 2055)	NRO	Low Earth	Optical Reconnaissance	20 Oct	Successful
12 Oct; 19:15	(United States) SRV Mission 4033		Low Earth	Film return	before 20 Oct	Successful
12 Oct; 19:15	(United States) Space Ground Link System (SLGS) 1 (OPS 5345)	NRO	Low Earth	Technology	21 Oct	Successful
14 Oct; 12:13:08	(Soviet Union) Vostok-2		(Soviet Union) Plesetsk LC-41/1		(Soviet Union)	
14 Oct; 12:13:08	(Soviet Union) Kosmos 129 (Zenit-2 No. 33L)		Low Earth	Optical reconnaissance	21 Oct	Successful
20 Oct; 07:50	(Soviet Union) Molniya 8K78M		(Soviet Union) Baikonur Site 1		(Soviet Union)	
20 Oct; 07:50	(Soviet Union) Molniya-1 #7		Molniya	Communications technology	11 Sep 1968	Successful
20 Oct; 08:46	(Soviet Union) Voskhod 11A57		(Soviet Union) Baikonur Baikonur Cosmodrome Site 31		(Soviet Union)	
20 Oct; 08:46	(Soviet Union) Kosmos 130 (Zenit-4 #24L)		Low Earth	Optical reconnaissance	28 Oct	Successful
22 Oct; 08:42:26	(Soviet Union) Molniya 8K78M		(Soviet Union) Baikonur LC-31/6		(Soviet Union)	
22 Oct; 08:42:26	(Soviet Union) Luna 12		Lunar transfer	Lunar orbiter	In orbit	Successful
22 Oct; 08:42:26	Took high-resolution photos of the Moon's surface from lunar orbit. Last contact: 19 Jan 1967					
26 Oct; 11:12:02	(United States) Atlas LV-3C Centaur-D		(United States) Canaveral LC-36B		(United States) NASA	
26 Oct; 11:12:02	(United States) Atlas Centaur 9 Surveyor SM-3	NASA	Highly elliptical	Technology	In orbit	Successful
26 Oct; 11:12:02	Launch vehicle development flight. It carried a mass model of the Surveyor spacecraft.					
26 Oct; 23:05:00	(United States) Delta E1		(United States) Cape Canaveral Space Launch Complex 17B		(United States) NASA	
26 Oct; 23:05:00	(United Nations) Intelsat II F-1 (Blue Bird)	Intelsat	Geosynchronous	Communications	In orbit	Successful
28 Oct; 11:56:02	(United States) Scout-B		(United States) Vandenberg Space Launch Complex 5		(United States) US Air Force	
28 Oct; 11:56:02	(United States) OV3-2	USAF	Low Earth	Radiation belt particle and fields experiments	29 Sep 1971	Successful
=== November ===
2 Nov; 00:45:03	(Soviet Union) R-36O		(Soviet Union) Baikonur Cosmodrome Site 162/36		(Soviet Union) RVSN	
2 Nov; 00:45:03	(Soviet Union) OGCh #06L	RVSN	LEO	Missile test	29 Nov	Spacecraft failure
2 Nov; 00:45:03	Second attempted orbital Fractional Orbital Bombardment System test.					
2 Nov; 20:24	(United States) Atlas-SLV3 Agena-D		(United States) Vandenberg AFB Space Launch Complex 4E		(United States)	
2 Nov; 20:24	(United States) KH-7 34 (OPS 2070)	NRO	Low Earth	Optical Reconnaissance	10 Nov	Successful
2 Nov; 20:24	(United States) SRV Mission 4034		Low Earth	Film return	before 10 Nov	Successful
2 Nov; 20:24	(United States) Space Ground Link System (SLGS) 2 (OPS 5424)	NRO	Low Earth	Technology	16 Nov	Successful
3 Nov; 13:50:42	(United States) Titan IIIC		(United States) Cape Canaveral Air Force Station Space Launch Complex 40		(United States)	
3 Nov; 13:50:42	(United States) Manned Orbiting Laboratory mockup	USAF	Low Earth	MOL mockup	9 Jan 1967	Successful
3 Nov; 13:50:42	(United States) OV4-1R		Low Earth	Communications	5 Jan 1967	Successful
3 Nov; 13:50:42	(United States) OV4-1T		Low Earth	Communications	11 Jan 1967	Successful
3 Nov; 13:50:42	(United States) OV1-6S		Low Earth	Optical target deployment	31 Dec	Successful
3 Nov; 13:50:42	(United States) Gemini B		Low Earth	Geosynchronous Communications	3 Nov (suborbital test)	Successful
6 Nov; 23:21:00	(United States) Atlas SLV-3 Agena D		(United States) Cape Canaveral Launch Complex 13		(United States)	
6 Nov; 23:21:00	(United States) Lunar Orbiter 2		Lunar	Mapping	11 Oct 67	Successful
8 Nov; 19:53:02	(United States) Thorad SLV-2G Agena D		(United States) Vandenberg Space Launch Complex 1W		(United States)	
8 Nov; 19:53:02	(United States) OPS 1866 CORONA J-38	NRO	Low Earth	Optical Reconnaissance	29 Nov	Successful
8 Nov; 19:53:02	(United States) SRV 727		Low Earth	Film return	Before 29 Nov	Successful
8 Nov; 19:53:02	(United States) SRV 728		Low Earth	Film return	Before 29 Nov	Successful
11 Nov; 19:07:59	(United States) Atlas SLV-3 Agena-D		(United States) Cape Canaveral LC-14		(United States)	
11 Nov; 19:07:59	(United States) GATV-5007	NASA	Low Earth	Docking target	23 Dec	Successful
11 Nov; 20:46:33	(United States) Titan II GLV		(United States) Cape Canaveral LC-19		(United States) US Air Force	
11 Nov; 20:46:33	(United States) Gemini XII	NASA	Low Earth	Technology/Biological/Target	15 Nov; 19:21:04	Successful
11 Nov; 20:46:33	Final Gemini flight					
12 Nov; 09:50	(Soviet Union) Voskhod 11A57		(Soviet Union) Plesetsk LC-41/1		(Soviet Union)	
12 Nov; 09:50	(Soviet Union) Kosmos 131 (Zenit-4 #25L)		Low Earth	Optical reconnaissance	20 Nov	Successful
16 Nov; 13:00	(Soviet Union) Kosmos-3		(Soviet Union) Plesetsk LC-41/5		(Soviet Union)	
16 Nov; 13:00	(Soviet Union) Strela-2 #2L		Low Earth	Communications	16 Nov	Launch failure
19 Nov; 08:00	(Soviet Union) Vostok-2		(Soviet Union) Baikonur LC-31		(Soviet Union)	
19 Nov; 08:00	(Soviet Union) Kosmos 132 (Zenit-4 #46L)		Low Earth	Optical reconnaissance	27 Nov	Successful
28 Nov; 11:00:00	(Soviet Union) Soyuz (rocket)		(Soviet Union) Baikonur LC-31		(Soviet Union)	
28 Nov; 11:00:00	(Soviet Union) Kosmos 133 (Soyuz 7K-OK No. 2)		Low Earth	Crewed spacecraft	30 Nov 10:21	Successful
28 Nov; 11:00:00	First test of Soyuz 7K-OK crewed spacecraft					
=== December ===
3 Dec; 08:15	(Soviet Union) Vostok-2		(Soviet Union) Baikonur LC-31		(Soviet Union)	
3 Dec; 08:15	(Soviet Union) Kosmos 134 (Zenit-4 #26L)		Low Earth	Optical reconnaissance	11 Dec	Successful
5 Dec; 21:09	(United States) Atlas-SLV3 Agena-D		(United States) Vandenberg AFB Space Launch Complex 4E		(United States)	
5 Dec; 21:09	(United States) KH-7 35 (OPS 1890)	NRO	Low Earth	Optical Reconnaissance	14 Dec	Successful
5 Dec; 21:09	(United States) SRV Mission 4035		Low Earth	Film return	before 14 Dec	Successful
5 Dec; 21:09	(United States) Agena Engine Diagnostic 1	NRO	Low Earth	Technology	8 Dec	Successful
7 Dec; 02:12:01	(United States) Atlas SLV-3 Agena-D		(United States) Cape Canaveral LC-12		(United States)	
7 Dec; 02:12:01	(United States) ATS-1 (Applications Technology Satellite)	NASA	Geostationary	Communications/weather	In orbit	Successful
7 Dec; 02:12:01	The first experimental equatorial synchronous satellite.					
11 Dec; 21:09:57	(United States) SM-65D Atlas D		(United States) Vandenberg ABRES-B-3		(United States) US Air Force	
11 Dec; 21:09:57	(United States) OV1-9	US Air Force	Low Earth	Radiation studies	In orbit	Successful
11 Dec; 21:09:57	(United States) OV1-10		Low Earth	Radiation studies	30 Nov 2002	Successful
12 December; 20:38?	(Soviet Union) Kosmos-2I		(Soviet Union) Kapustin Yar LC-86/1		(Soviet Union)	
12 December; 20:38?	(Soviet Union) Kosmos 135		Planned: Low Earth	Micrometeoroid	12 April 1967	Successful
14 Dec; 11:00:00	(Soviet Union) Soyuz (rocket)		(Soviet Union) Baikonur LC-31		(Soviet Union)	
14 Dec; 11:00:00	(Soviet Union) Soyuz 7K-OK No.1		Low Earth	Crewed spacecraft	14 Dec	Launch failure
14 Dec; 11:00:00	Second test of Soyuz 7K-OK crewed spacecraft					
14 Dec; 18:14	(United States) Titan IIIB		(United States) Vandenberg AFB Space Launch Complex 4W		(United States)	
14 Dec; 18:14	(United States) KH-8 Gambit #3 (OPS 8968)	NRO	Low Earth	Optical Reconnaissance	24 Dec	Successful
14 Dec; 18:14	(United States) SRV Mission 4303		Low Earth	Film return	before 24 Dec	Successful
14 December; 19:20:03	(United States) Delta G		(United States) Cape Canaveral LC-17A		(United States)	
14 December; 19:20:03	(United States) Biosatellite 1	NASA	Low Earth	Bioscience	15 February 1967	Successful
19 Dec; 12:00:01	(Soviet Union) Vostok-2		(Soviet Union) Plesetsk LC-41/1		(Soviet Union)	
19 Dec; 12:00:01	(Soviet Union) Kosmos 136 (Zenit-4 #47L)		Low Earth	Optical reconnaissance	27 Dec	Successful
20 Dec; 02:20	(Japan) Lambda 4S		(Japan) Kagoshima Pad L		(Japan) JAXA	
20 Dec; 02:20	(Japan) L-4S-2	JAXA			20 Dec	Launch failure
21 Dec; 10:17:08	(Soviet Union) Molniya-M		(Soviet Union) Baikonur Site 1		(Soviet Union)	
21 Dec; 10:17:08	(Soviet Union) Luna 13		Lunar transfer	Lunar lander	24 Dec	Successful
21 Dec; 10:17:08	Last contact: 28 December 1966, 06:13					
21 Dec; 13:12?	(Soviet Union) Kosmos (63S1)		(Soviet Union) Kapustin Yar LC-86/1		(Soviet Union)	
21 Dec; 13:12?	(Soviet Union) Kosmos 137		Planned: Low Earth	Magnetosphere	23 Nov 1967	Successful
21 Dec; 13:12?	Last contact: 12 May 1967					
21 Dec; 22:15:02	(United States) Atlas SLV-3		(United States) Cape Canaveral Vandenberg Space Launch Complex 3E		(United States)	
21 Dec; 22:15:02	(United States) SV-5D FV-1	US Air Force	Low Earth	Lifting body reentry test	21 Dec	Successful
21 Dec; 22:15:02	First test of PRIME					
29 Dec; 12:00:06	(United States) Thor SLV-2A Agena D		(United States) Vandenberg Space Launch Complex 2W		(United States)	
29 Dec; 12:00:06	(United States) MULTIGROUP 1/SETTER 1A (OPS 1584)	NRO	Low Earth	ELINT	5 Apr 1969	Successful

- ← Jan
- Feb
- Mar
- Apr
- May
- Jun
- Jul
- Aug
- Sep
- Oct
- Nov
- Dec →

== Suborbital launches ==
- ← Jan
- Feb
- Mar
- Apr
- May
- Jun
- Jul
- Aug
- Sep
- Oct
- Nov
- Dec →

Date and time (UTC)	Rocket	Flight number	Launch site		LSP	
Date and time (UTC)	Payload (⚀ = CubeSat)	Operator	Orbit	Function	Decay (UTC)	Outcome
Date and time (UTC)	Remarks					
=== January-December ===
14 July	(China) T-7A-S2		(China) Shijiedu		(China) SIED	
14 July	(China) Capsule with a dog		Suborbital	Biology experiment	14 July	Successful
14 July	Apogee: 100 km					
28 July	(China) T-7A-S2		(China) Shijiedu		(China) SIED	
28 July	(China) Capsule with a dog		Suborbital	Biology experiment	28 July	Successful
28 July	Apogee: 100 km					

- ← Jan
- Feb
- Mar
- Apr
- May
- Jun
- Jul
- Aug
- Sep
- Oct
- Nov
- Dec →

== Gemini and Apollo launches ==
Launch Date/Time	Rocket	Launch Site	Launch Contractor	Payload	Operator	Orbit	Mission/ Function	Re-Entry/ Destruction	Outcome	Remarks
16 March; 15:00 GMT	Atlas D	LC-14, Cape Canaveral	US Air Force	GATV 5003	NASA	LEO	Gemini docking target.	15 September 1967	Successful	Used by Gemini 8 and Gemini 10
16 March; 16:41 GMT	Titan II	LC-19, Cape Canaveral	US Air Force	Gemini 8, 2 Astronauts	NASA	LEO	Crewed Orbital Flight	17 March 1966	Partial Failure	First docking in space. (with GATV). OAMS malfunction caused loss of control. Spacecraft became low on fuel after recovering. Terminated early.
17 May; 15:12 GMT	Atlas D	LC-14, Cape Canaveral	US Air Force	GATV 5004	NASA	LEO	Gemini docking target.	17 May 1966	Failure	Failed to reach orbit. Intended for use by Gemini 9
1 June; 15:00 GMT	Atlas SLV-3	LC-14, Cape Canaveral	US Air Force	ATDA 02186	NASA	LEO	Gemini docking target.	11 June 1966	Failure	Fairing failed to separate Intended for use by Gemini 9A
3 June; 16:41 GMT	Titan II	LC-19, Cape Canaveral	US Air Force	Gemini 9A, 2 Astronauts	NASA	LEO	Crewed Orbital Flight	6 June 1966	Partial Failure	Unable to complete primary objective - Docking with ATDA - due to ATDA payload fairing malfunction
5 July; 14:53 GMT	Saturn IB (C-1B)	LC-37B, Cape Canaveral	NASA	(none)	N/A	N/A	Test launch vehicle	N/A	Successful	
18 July; 20:39 GMT	Atlas D	LC-14, Cape Canaveral	US Air Force	GATV 5005	NASA	LEO	Gemini docking target.	29 December 1966	Successful	Used by Gemini 10
18 July; 22:20 GMT	Titan II	LC-19, Cape Canaveral	US Air Force	Gemini 10, 2 Astronauts	NASA	LEO	Crewed Orbital Flight	21 July 1966	Successful	
25 August; 17:15 GMT	Saturn IB (C-1B)	LC-34, Cape Canaveral	NASA	Apollo Spacecraft (AS-202)	NASA	Sub-orbital	Test Apollo Spacecraft and Launch Vehicle	25 August 1966; 18:48 GMT	Successful	
12 September; 13:05 GMT	Atlas D	LC-14, Cape Canaveral	US Air Force	GATV 5006	NASA	LEO	Gemini docking target.	30 December 1966	Successful	Used by Gemini 11
12 September; 14:42 GMT	Titan II	LC-19, Cape Canaveral	US Air Force	Gemini 11, 2 Astronauts	NASA	LEO	Crewed Orbital Flight	15 September 1966	Successful	Altitude record for crewed Earth-Orbit flight
11 November; 20:46 GMT	Atlas D	LC-14, Cape Canaveral	US Air Force	GATV 5001A	NASA	LEO	Gemini docking target.	23 December 1966	Failure	Failed to ignite. Used by Gemini 12
11 November; 20:46 GMT	Titan II	LC-19, Cape Canaveral	US Air Force	Gemini 12, 2 Astronauts	NASA	LEO	Crewed Orbital Flight	15 November 1966	Successful	Final Gemini flight

== Deep Space Rendezvous ==
Date (UTC)	Spacecraft	Event	Remarks
3 February	Luna 9	First lunar landing	in Oceanus Procellarum; first soft landing on a celestial body and first images from lunar surface
27 February	Venera 2	Flyby of Venus	Communication lost en route
1 March	Venera 3	First Venus impact	Communication lost en route
3 April	Luna 10	Selenocentric orbit insertion	first orbiter of the Moon
2 June	Surveyor 1	Lunar landing	in Oceanus Procellarum
14 August	Lunar Orbiter 1	Selenocentric orbit insertion	Returned 211 images
27 August	Luna 11	Selenocentric orbit insertion	
23 September	Surveyor 2	Lunar impact	Failed lander, impacted Sinus Medii
25 October	Luna 12	Selenocentric orbit insertion	
29 October	Lunar Orbiter 1	Lunar impact	
10 November	Lunar Orbiter 2	Selenocentric orbit injection	Returned 184 images
24 December	Luna 13	Lunar landing	in Oceanus Procellarum

== EVAs ==
Start date/time	Duration	End time	Spacecraft	Crew	Remarks
5 June; 15:02	2 hours 7 minutes	17:09	Gemini IX-A	(United States) Eugene Cernan	A complex EVA was planned. Cernan expended four to five times the expected effort, raising his pulse as high as 180 beats per minute. Excess heat and respiration completely fogged visor, causing the EVA to be cut short. Cernan also had difficulty returning to spacecraft and closing the hatch.
19 July; 21:44	49 Minutes	22:33	Gemini X	(United States) Michael Collins	Collins performed a stand-up EVA. Instead of climbing completely out of the spacecraft, Collins extended his torso outside the spacecraft to take photos before and after capsule sunrise. Color photography after sunrise was only partly completed due to severe eye irritation of both Collins and Command Pilot Young. Handling the camera proved difficult due to stiffness of spacesuit gloves.
20 July; 23:01	39 minutes	23:40	Gemini X	(United States) Michael Collins	Umbilical EVA; with more difficulty than expected, Collins collected the micrometeorite collection package from the outside of Gemini. Then, using the Hand Held Maneuvering Unit, he pushed to the nearby Agena-8 to collect its micrometeorite collection package. Collins then pulled on the umbilical cord to return and re-enter the spacecraft.
13 September; 14:44	33 minutes	15:17	Gemini XI	(United States) Richard F. Gordon Jr.	Gordon attached a tether between Gemini and Agena 11 for later orbital mechanics testing. While making the attachment, his work load exceeded the spacesuit cooling system, and his vision became obscured by a fogged visor and sweat in his eyes. Planned activities were curtailed by Command Pilot Conrad and Gordon returned to the spacecraft.
14 September; 12:49	2 hours 8 minutes	14:57	Gemini XI	(United States) Richard F. Gordon Jr.	Gordon performed a stand-up EVA. He extended through the hatch to take astronomical photos. Conrad reported the spacewalk was so relaxing they both fell asleep for a moment after sunrise.
12 November; 16:15	2 hours 29 minutes	18:44	Gemini XII	(United States) Buzz Aldrin	Aldrin performed a stand-up EVA. Aldrin stood, took UV still photos and 16 mm color movie pictures, collected external experimental samples, and conducted a light exercise routine.
13 November; 15:34	2 hours 6 minutes	17:40	Gemini XII	(United States) Buzz Aldrin	First completely successful umbilical EVA, with all objectives achieved. Aldrin was able to control his movements and restrict his work load using techniques developed using underwater zero gravity simulations. He also benefited from experiences of the previous American EVAs and was able to move around the outside of the craft, deploy and recover various experimental packages, install and remove cameras, and practice work techniques using a ratchet-type wrench.
14 November; 14:52	55 minutes	15:47	Gemini XII	(United States) Buzz Aldrin	Aldrin performed a second stand-up EVA. He again extended outside the hatch to take photographs and repeat the light exercise experiment. Exertion levels during exercise were comparable to preflight simulations. Equipment and waste food containers not needed for reentry were jettisoned from the spacecraft.

== Orbital launch statistics ==
=== By country ===
Launches by country
Country	Launches	Successes	Failures	Partial failures
France	1	1	0	0
Japan	2 (Note: First launch attempt)	0	2	0
Soviet Union	53	42	9	2
United States	80	74	7	0
World	136	117	18	2
