= Kosmos 196 =

Soviet upper atmosphere research satellite

- Mission type: Solar research
- COSPAR ID: 1967-125A
- SATCAT no.: 03074
- Mission duration: 201 days

Spacecraft properties
- Spacecraft type: DS-U1-G
- Manufacturer: Yuzhnoye
- Launch mass: 352 kg

Start of mission
- Launch date: 19 December 1967, 06:30:07 GMT
- Rocket: Kosmos 63S1
- Launch site: Kapustin Yar, 86/1
- Contractor: Yuzhnoye

End of mission
- Decay date: 7 July 1968

Orbital parameters
- Reference system: Geocentric
- Regime: Low Earth
- Perigee altitude: 223 km
- Apogee altitude: 860 km
- Inclination: 49.0°
- Period: 95.5 minutes
- Epoch: 19 December 1967

Kosmos 196 (Russian: Космос 196 meaning Cosmos 196), also known as DS-U1-G No.2, was a Soviet satellite which was launched in 1967 as part of the Dnepropetrovsk Sputnik programme. It was a 352 kilograms (776 lb) spacecraft, which was built by the Yuzhnoye Design Office, and was used to study the effects of solar activity on the upper atmosphere.

A Kosmos 63S1 carrier rocket was used to launch Kosmos 196 into low Earth orbit. The launch took place from Site 86/1 at Kapustin Yar. The launch occurred at 06:30:07 GMT on 19 December 1967, and resulted in the successfully insertion of the satellite into low Earth orbit. Upon reaching orbit, the satellite was assigned its Kosmos designation, and received the International Designator 1967-125A. The North American Air Defense Command assigned it the catalogue number 03074.

Kosmos 196 was the second of two DS-U1-G satellites to be launched, after Kosmos 108. It was operated in an orbit with a perigee of 223 kilometres (139 mi), an apogee of 860 kilometres (530 mi), an inclination of 49.0°, and an orbital period of 95.5 minutes. It completed operations on 7 February 1968. On 7 July 1968, it decayed from orbit and reentered the atmosphere.

== See also ==
- 1967 in spaceflight
