= Kosmos 119 =

Soviet satellite launched in 1966

- Mission type: Ionospheric
- COSPAR ID: 1966-043A
- SATCAT no.: 02182
- Mission duration: 100 days

Spacecraft properties
- Spacecraft type: DS-U2-I
- Manufacturer: Yuzhnoye
- Launch mass: 250 kg

Start of mission
- Launch date: 24 May 1966, 05:30:59 GMT
- Rocket: Kosmos-2I 63SM
- Launch site: Kapustin Yar, Site 86/1
- Contractor: Yuzhnoye

End of mission
- Decay date: 30 November 1966

Orbital parameters
- Reference system: Geocentric
- Regime: Low Earth
- Perigee altitude: 208 km
- Apogee altitude: 1292 km
- Inclination: 48.5°
- Period: 99.8 minutes
- Epoch: 24 May 1966

Kosmos 119 (Russian: Космос 119 meaning Cosmos 119), also known as DS-U2-I No.1, was a Soviet satellite which was launched in 1966 as part of the Dnepropetrovsk Sputnik programme. It was a 250 kilograms (550 lb) spacecraft, which was built by the Yuzhnoye Design Bureau, and was used to study the effects on radio waves of passing through the ionosphere.

A Kosmos-2I 63SM carrier rocket was used to launch Kosmos 119 into low Earth orbit. The launch took place from Site 86/1 at Kapustin Yar. The launch occurred at 05:30:59 GMT on 24 May 1966, and resulted in the successful insertion of the satellite into orbit. Upon reaching orbit, the satellite was assigned its Kosmos designation, and received the International Designator 1966-043A. The North American Air Defense Command assigned it the catalogue number 02182.

Kosmos 119 was the first of three DS-U2-I satellites to be launched. It was operated in an orbit with a perigee of 208 kilometres (129 mi), an apogee of 1,292 kilometres (803 mi), an inclination of 48.5°, and an orbital period of 99.8 minutes. On 30 November 1966, it decayed from orbit and reentered the atmosphere.

== See also ==
- 1966 in spaceflight
