= Kosmos 108 =

Soviet satellite

- Mission type: Solar research
- COSPAR ID: 1966-011A
- SATCAT no.: 02002
- Mission duration: 283 days

Spacecraft properties
- Spacecraft type: DS-U1-G
- Manufacturer: Yuzhnoye
- Launch mass: 355 kg

Start of mission
- Launch date: 11 February 1966, 18:00:00 GMT
- Rocket: Kosmos 63S1
- Launch site: Kapustin Yar, Site 86/1
- Contractor: Yuzhnoye

End of mission
- Decay date: 21 November 1966

Orbital parameters
- Reference system: Geocentric
- Regime: Low Earth
- Perigee altitude: 219 km
- Apogee altitude: 855 km
- Inclination: 48.9°
- Period: 95.3 minutes
- Epoch: 11 February 1966

Kosmos 108 (Russian: Космос 108 meaning Cosmos 108), also known as DS-U1-G No.1, was a Soviet satellite which was launched in 1966 as part of the Dnepropetrovsk Sputnik programme. It was a 355 kilograms (783 lb) spacecraft, which was built by the Yuzhnoye Design Office and was used to study the effects of solar activity on the upper atmosphere.

A Kosmos 63S1 carrier rocket was used to launch Kosmos 108 into low Earth orbit. The launch took place from Site 86/1 at Kapustin Yar. The launch occurred at 18:00 GMT on 11 February 1966, and resulted in the successfully insertion of the satellite into low Earth orbit. Upon reaching orbit, the satellite was assigned its Kosmos designation, and received the International Designator 1966-011A. The North American Air Defense Command assigned it the catalogue number 02002.

Kosmos 108 was the first of two DS-U1-G satellites to be launched, the other being Kosmos 196 (19 December 1967). It was operated in an orbit with a perigee of 219 kilometres (136 mi), an apogee of 855 kilometres (531 mi), an inclination of 48.9°, and an orbital period of 95.3 minutes. It completed operations on 26 February 1966. On 21 November 1966, it decayed from orbit and reentered the atmosphere.

== See also ==
- 1966 in spaceflight
