= Kosmos 116 =

Soviet satellite

- Mission type: ABM radar target
- COSPAR ID: 1966-036A
- SATCAT no.: 02152
- Mission duration: 221 days

Spacecraft properties
- Spacecraft type: DS-P1-Yu
- Manufacturer: Yuzhnoye
- Launch mass: 325 kg

Start of mission
- Launch date: 26 April 1966, 10:04:00 GMT
- Rocket: Kosmos-2M 63S1M
- Launch site: Kapustin Yar, Site 86/1
- Contractor: Yuzhnoye

End of mission
- Decay date: 3 December 1966

Orbital parameters
- Reference system: Geocentric
- Regime: Low Earth
- Perigee altitude: 289 km
- Apogee altitude: 451 km
- Inclination: 48.4°
- Period: 92.0 minutes
- Epoch: 26 April 1966

Kosmos 116 (Russian: Космос 116 meaning Cosmos 116), also known as DS-P1-Yu No.6 was a Soviet satellite which was used as a radar calibration target for tests of anti-ballistic missiles. It was built by the Yuzhnoye Design Bureau, and launched in 1966 as part of the Dnepropetrovsk Sputnik programme.

Kosmos 116 was launched using a Kosmos-2M 63S1M carrier rocket, which flew from Site 86/1 at Kapustin Yar. The launch occurred at 10:04 GMT on 26 April 1966, and was successful. Kosmos 116 separated from its carrier rocket into a low Earth orbit with a perigee of 289 kilometres (180 mi), an apogee of 451 kilometres (280 mi), an inclination of 48.4°, and an orbital period of 92.0 minutes. It decayed from orbit on 3 December 1966. Kosmos 116 was the fifth of seventy nine DS-P1-Yu satellites to be launched, and the fourth of seventy two to successfully reach orbit.

== See also ==
- 1966 in spaceflight
