= Kosmos 163 =

Soviet satellite

- Mission type: Micrometeoroid research
- COSPAR ID: 1967-056A
- SATCAT no.: 02832
- Mission duration: 128 days

Spacecraft properties
- Spacecraft type: DS-U2-MP
- Manufacturer: Yuzhnoye
- Launch mass: 357 kg

Start of mission
- Launch date: 5 June 1967, 05:03:00 GMT
- Rocket: Kosmos-2I 63SM
- Launch site: Kapustin Yar, Site 86/1
- Contractor: Yuzhnoye

End of mission
- Decay date: 11 October 1967

Orbital parameters
- Reference system: Geocentric
- Regime: Low Earth
- Perigee altitude: 244 km
- Apogee altitude: 611 km
- Inclination: 48.4°
- Period: 93.1 minutes
- Epoch: 5 June 1967

Kosmos 163 (Russian: Космос 163 meaning Cosmos 163), also known as DS-U2-MP No.2, was a Soviet satellite which was launched in 1967 as part of the Dnepropetrovsk Sputnik programme. It was a 357 kilograms (787 lb) spacecraft, which was built by the Yuzhnoye Design Office, and was used to investigate micrometeoroids and cosmic dust particles in near-Earth space.

A Kosmos-2I 63SM carrier rocket was used to launch Kosmos 163 into low Earth orbit. The launch took place from Site 86/1 at Kapustin Yar. The launch occurred at 05:03:00 GMT on 5 June 1967, and resulted in the successful insertion of the satellite into orbit. Upon reaching orbit, the satellite was assigned its Kosmos designation, and received the International Designator 1967-056A. The North American Air Defense Command assigned it the catalogue number 02832.

Kosmos 163 was the second of two DS-U2-MP satellites to be launched, after Kosmos 135. It was operated in an orbit with a perigee of 244 kilometres (152 mi), an apogee of 611 kilometres (380 mi), an inclination of 48.4°, and an orbital period of 93.1 minutes. It decayed from its orbit and reentered the atmosphere on 11 October 1967.

== See also ==
- 1967 in spaceflight
