= Kosmos 135 =

Soviet satellite launched in 1966

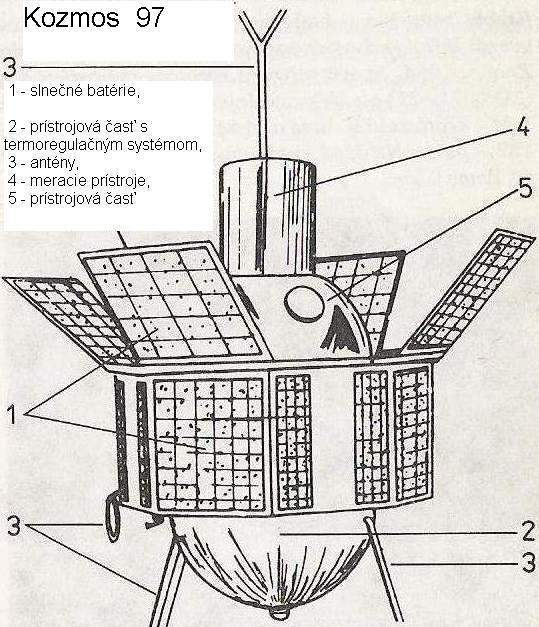
- Mission type: Micrometeoroid research
- COSPAR ID: 1966-112A
- SATCAT no.: 02612
- Mission duration: 121 days

Spacecraft properties
- Spacecraft type: DS-U2-MP
- Manufacturer: Yuzhnoye
- Launch mass: 355 kg

Start of mission
- Launch date: 12 December 1966; 20:37:59 GMT
- Rocket: Kosmos-2I 63SM
- Launch site: Kapustin Yar, Site 86/1
- Contractor: Yuzhnoye

End of mission
- Decay date: 12 April 1967

Orbital parameters
- Reference system: Geocentric
- Regime: Low Earth
- Perigee altitude: 253 km
- Apogee altitude: 649 km
- Inclination: 48.5°
- Period: 93.5 minutes
- Epoch: 12 December 1966

Kosmos 135 (Russian: Космос 135 meaning Cosmos 135), also known as DS-U2-MP No.1, was a Soviet satellite which was launched in 1966 as part of the Dnepropetrovsk Sputnik programme. It was a 355 kilograms (783 lb) spacecraft, which was built by the Yuzhnoye Design Office, and was used to investigate micrometeoroids and particles of dust in space.

A Kosmos-2I 63SM carrier rocket was used to launch Kosmos 135 into low Earth orbit. The launch took place from Site 86/1 at Kapustin Yar. The launch occurred at 20:37:59 GMT on 12 December 1966, and resulted in the successful insertion of the satellite into orbit. Upon reaching orbit, the satellite was assigned its Kosmos designation, and received the International Designator 1966-112A. The North American Air Defense Command assigned it the catalogue number 02612.

Kosmos 135 was the first of two DS-U2-MP satellites to be launched, the other being Kosmos 163 (5 June 1967). It was operated in an orbit with a perigee of 253 kilometres (157 mi), an apogee of 649 kilometres (403 mi), an inclination of 48.5°, and an orbital period of 93.5 minutes. It decayed from its orbit and reentered in the atmosphere on 12 April 1967.

== See also ==
- 1966 in spaceflight
