= Kosmos 137 =

Soviet satellite

- Mission type: Magnetosphere
- COSPAR ID: 1966-117A
- SATCAT no.: 02627
- Mission duration: 142 days

Spacecraft properties
- Spacecraft type: DS-U2-D
- Manufacturer: Yuzhnoye
- Launch mass: 295 kg

Start of mission
- Launch date: 21 December 1966; 13:11:59 GMT
- Rocket: Kosmos-2I 63S1
- Launch site: Kapustin Yar, Site 86/1
- Contractor: Yuzhnoye

End of mission
- Last contact: 12 May 1967
- Decay date: 23 November 1967

Orbital parameters
- Reference system: Geocentric
- Regime: Low Earth
- Perigee altitude: 219 km
- Apogee altitude: 1718 km
- Inclination: 48.8°
- Period: 104.3 minutes
- Epoch: 21 December 1966

Kosmos 137 (Russian: Космос 137 meaning Cosmos 137), also known as DS-U2-D No.1, was a Soviet satellite which was launched in 1966 as part of the Dnepropetrovsk Sputnik programme. It was a 295 kilograms (650 lb) spacecraft, which was built by the Yuzhnoye Design Bureau, and was used to investigate charged particles in the Earth's magnetosphere.

A Kosmos-2I 63S1 carrier rocket was used to launch Kosmos 137 into low Earth orbit. The launch took place from Site 86/1 at Kapustin Yar. The launch occurred at 13:11:59 GMT on 21 December 1966, and resulted in the successful insertion of the satellite into orbit. Upon reaching orbit, the satellite was assigned its Kosmos designation, and received the International Designator 1966-117A. The North American Air Defense Command assigned it the catalogue number 02627.

Kosmos 137 was the first of two DS-U2-D satellites to be launched, and was followed by Kosmos 219 (26 April 1968). It was operated in an orbit with a perigee of 219 kilometres (136 mi), an apogee of 1,718 kilometres (1,068 mi), an inclination of 48.8°, and an orbital period of 104.3 minutes. It completed operations on 12 May 1967, before decaying from orbit and reentering the atmosphere on 23 November 1967.

== See also ==
- 1966 in spaceflight
