= Kosmos 123 =

Soviet military satellite

- Mission type: ABM radar target
- COSPAR ID: 1966-061A
- SATCAT no.: 02295
- Mission duration: 155 days

Spacecraft properties
- Spacecraft type: DS-P1-Yu
- Manufacturer: Yuzhnoye
- Launch mass: 325 kg

Start of mission
- Launch date: 8 July 1966, 05:31:00 GMT
- Rocket: Kosmos-2I 63S1
- Launch site: Kapustin Yar, Site 86/1
- Contractor: Yuzhnoye

End of mission
- Decay date: 10 December 1966

Orbital parameters
- Reference system: Geocentric
- Regime: Low Earth
- Perigee altitude: 256 km
- Apogee altitude: 512 km
- Inclination: 48.8°
- Period: 92.2 minutes
- Epoch: 8 July 1966

Kosmos 123 (Russian: Космос 123 meaning Cosmos 123), also known as DS-P1-Yu No.5 was a Soviet satellite which was used as a radar calibration target for tests of anti-ballistic missiles. It was built by the Yuzhnoye Design Bureau, and launched in 1966 as part of the Dnepropetrovsk Sputnik programme.

A Kosmos-2I 63S1 carrier rocket was used to launch Kosmos 123. The launch occurred from Site 86/1 at Kapustin Yar, at 05:31 GMT on 8 July 1966. and following its successful arrival in orbit the spacecraft received its Kosmos designation; along with the International Designator 1966-061A and the Satellite Catalog Number 02295.

Kosmos 123 separated from the carrier rocket into a low Earth orbit with a perigee of 256 kilometres (159 mi), an apogee of 512 kilometres (318 mi), an inclination of 48.8°, and an orbital period of 92.2 minutes. It decayed from orbit on 10 December 1966. Kosmos 123 was the sixth of seventy-nine DS-P1-Yu satellites to be launched, and the fifth of seventy-two to successfully reach orbit.

== See also ==
- 1966 in spaceflight
