= Kosmos 106 =

Soviet ABM radar target satellite (DS-P

- Mission type: ABM Radar target
- COSPAR ID: 1966-004A
- SATCAT no.: 1949
- Mission duration: 9 months and 20 days

Spacecraft properties
- Spacecraft type: DS-P1-I
- Manufacturer: Yuzhnoye
- Launch mass: 325 kg

Start of mission
- Launch date: 25 January 1966, 12:28:00 GMT
- Rocket: Kosmos-2M 63S1M
- Launch site: Kapustin Yar 86/1
- Contractor: Yuzhnoye

End of mission
- Decay date: 14 November 1966

Orbital parameters
- Reference system: Geocentric
- Regime: Low Earth
- Perigee altitude: 281 km
- Apogee altitude: 553 km
- Inclination: 48.4°
- Period: 92.8 minutes
- Epoch: 25 January 1966

Kosmos 106 (Russian: Космос 106 meaning Cosmos 106), also known as DS-P1-I No.1 was a satellite which was used as a radar target for anti-ballistic missile tests. It was launched by the Soviet Union in 1966 as part of the Dnepropetrovsk Sputnik programme and had a mass of 325 kilograms (717 lb).

It was launched aboard a Kosmos-2M 63S1M rocket, from Site 86/1 at Kapustin Yar. The launch occurred at 12:28 GMT on 25 January 1966. It was the only DS-P1-I satellite to be launched on the short-lived Kosmos-2M before launches switched to the Kosmos-2I 63SM variant.

Kosmos 106 was placed into a low Earth orbit with a perigee of 281 kilometres (175 mi), an apogee of 553 kilometres (344 mi), an inclination of 48.4°, and an orbital period of 92.8 minutes. It decayed from orbit on 14 November 1966.

Kosmos 106 was the first of nineteen DS-P1-I satellites to be launched. Of these, all reached orbit successfully except the DS-P1-I No.6 (seventh), on 30 January 1970.

== See also ==
- 1966 in spaceflight
