= Kosmos 219 =

Soviet magnetosphere monitoring satellite

- Mission type: Magnetosphere
- COSPAR ID: 1968-038A
- SATCAT no.: 03220
- Mission duration: 310 days

Spacecraft properties
- Spacecraft type: DS-U2-D
- Manufacturer: Yuzhnoye
- Launch mass: 400 kg

Start of mission
- Launch date: 26 April 1968, 04:42:56 GMT
- Rocket: Kosmos-2I 63SM
- Launch site: Kapustin Yar, Site 86/4
- Contractor: Yuzhnoye

End of mission
- Last contact: 28 February 1969
- Decay date: 2 March 1969

Orbital parameters
- Reference system: Geocentric
- Regime: Low Earth
- Perigee altitude: 215 km
- Apogee altitude: 1745 km
- Inclination: 48.4°
- Period: 104.7 minutes
- Epoch: 26 April 1968

Kosmos 219 (Russian: Космос 219 meaning Cosmos 219), also known as DS-U2-D No.2, was a Soviet satellite which was launched in 1968 as part of the Dnepropetrovsk Sputnik programme. It was a 400 kilograms (880 lb) spacecraft, which was built by the Yuzhnoye Design Bureau, and was used to investigate flows of charged particles in the magnetosphere of the Earth.

A Kosmos-2I 63SM carrier rocket was used to launch Kosmos 219 into low Earth orbit. The launch took place from Site 86/4 at Kapustin Yar. The launch occurred at 04:42:56 GMT on 26 April 1968, and resulted in the successful insertion of the satellite into orbit. Upon reaching orbit, the satellite was assigned its Kosmos designation, and received the International Designator 1968-038A. The North American Aerospace Air Command assigned it the catalogue number 03220.

Kosmos 219 was the second of two DS-U2-D satellites to be launched, after Kosmos 137. It was operated in an orbit with a perigee of 215 kilometres (134 mi), an apogee of 1,745 kilometres (1,084 mi), 48.4° of inclination, and an orbital period of 104.7 minutes. It completed operations on 28 February 1969, before decaying from orbit and reentering the atmosphere on 2 March.

== See also ==
- 1968 in spaceflight
