= Luna 11 =

Soviet lunar orbiter

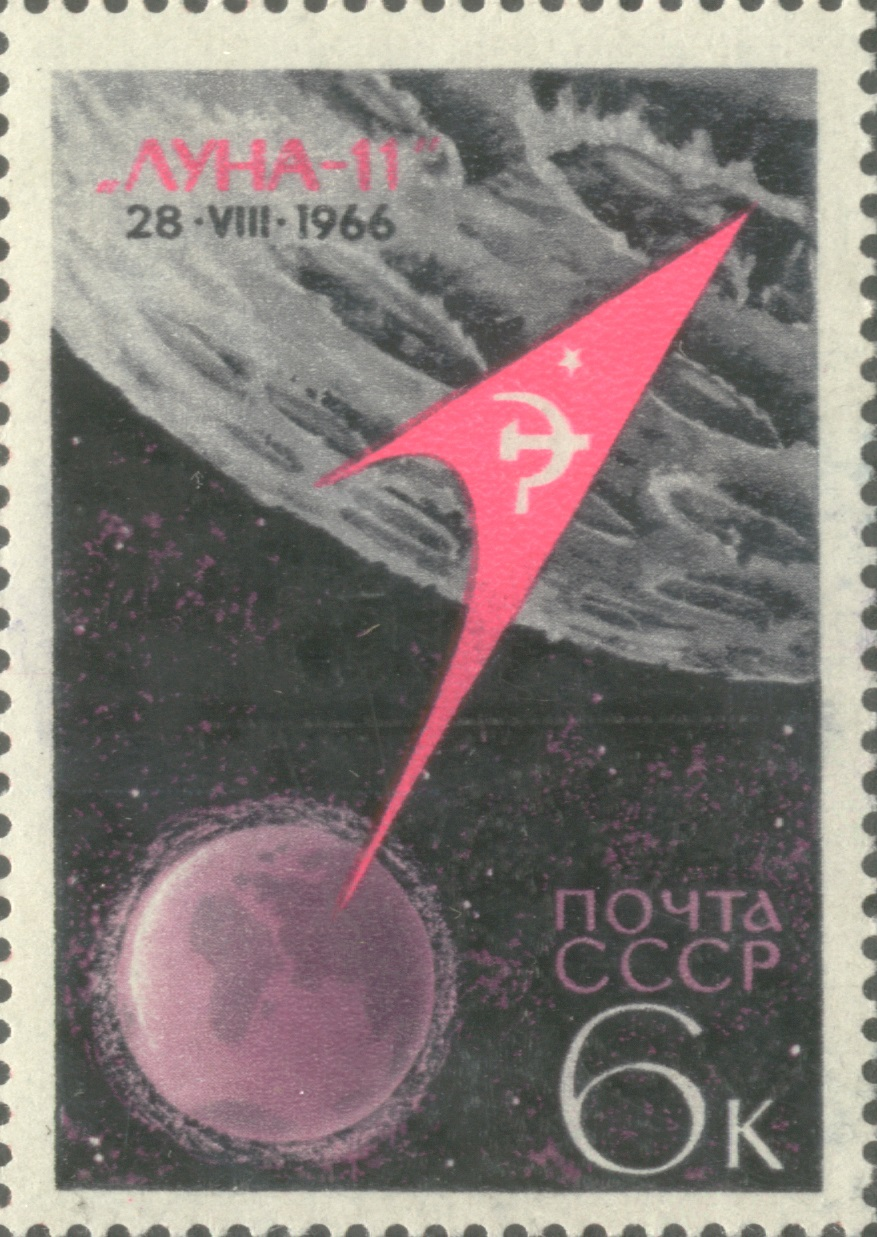
- Stamp commemorating Luna 11
- Mission type: Lunar orbiter
- Operator: Soviet space program
- COSPAR ID: 1966-078A
- SATCAT no.: 02406
- Mission duration: 38 days

Spacecraft properties
- Spacecraft type: E-6LF
- Manufacturer: GSMZ Lavochkin
- Launch mass: 1640 kg
- Dry mass: 1136 kg

Start of mission
- Launch date: 24 August 1966, 08:03:21 UTC
- Rocket: Molniya-M 8K78M
- Launch site: Baikonur, Site 31/6
- Contractor: TsSKB-Progress

End of mission
- Last contact: 1 October 1966
- Decay date: Late 1966 or Early 1967

Orbital parameters
- Reference system: Selenocentric
- Periselene altitude: 1898 km
- Aposelene altitude: 2931 km
- Inclination: 27°
- Period: 178 minutes
- Epoch: 24 August 1966

Lunar orbiter
- Orbital insertion: 27 August 1966, 21:49 GMT
- Orbits: 277

Instruments
- Imaging system for lunar photography Gamma-ray spectrometer Magnetometer; Radiation detectors Infrared radiometer Meteoroid detector R-1 transmission experiment

Luna 11 (E-6LF series) was an uncrewed space mission of the Soviet Union's Luna program. It was also called Lunik 11. Luna 11 was launched towards the Moon on board a Molniya-M and entered lunar orbit on 27 August 1966.

== Overview ==
The objectives of the mission included the study of:

- lunar gamma and X-ray emissions in order to determine the Moon's chemical composition;
- lunar gravitational anomalies;
- the concentration of meteorite streams near the Moon;
- the intensity of hard corpuscular radiation near the Moon.

137 radio transmissions and 277 orbits of the Moon were completed before the batteries failed on 1 October 1966.

This subset of the "second-generation" Luna spacecraft, the E-6LF, was designed to take the first photographs of the surface of the Moon from lunar orbit. A secondary objective was to obtain data on mass concentrations ("mascons") on the Moon first detected by Luna 10. Using the Ye-6 bus, a suite of scientific instruments (plus an imaging system similar to the one used on Zond 3) replaced the small lander capsule used on the soft-landing flights. The resolution of the photos was 15 to 20 meters. To reduce problems caused by damage to the film due to solar radiation it was planned to take all photos within the first 24 hours of lunar orbits. A technological experiment included testing the efficiency of gear transmission in a vacuum as a test for a future lunar rover.

Luna 11, launched only two weeks after the U.S. Lunar Orbiter, entered lunar orbit at 21:49 GMT on 27 August 1966. Parameters were 99 x 742 miles. During the mission, the TV camera failed to return usable images because the spacecraft lost proper orientation to face the lunar surface when a foreign object was lodged in the nozzle of one of the attitude-control thrusters. The other instruments functioned without fault before the mission formally ended on 1 October 1966 after the power supply had been depleted. The spacecraft eventually crashed on the moon on an unknown date.
