= Martin X-23 PRIME =

American experimental aircraft

X-23A PRIME
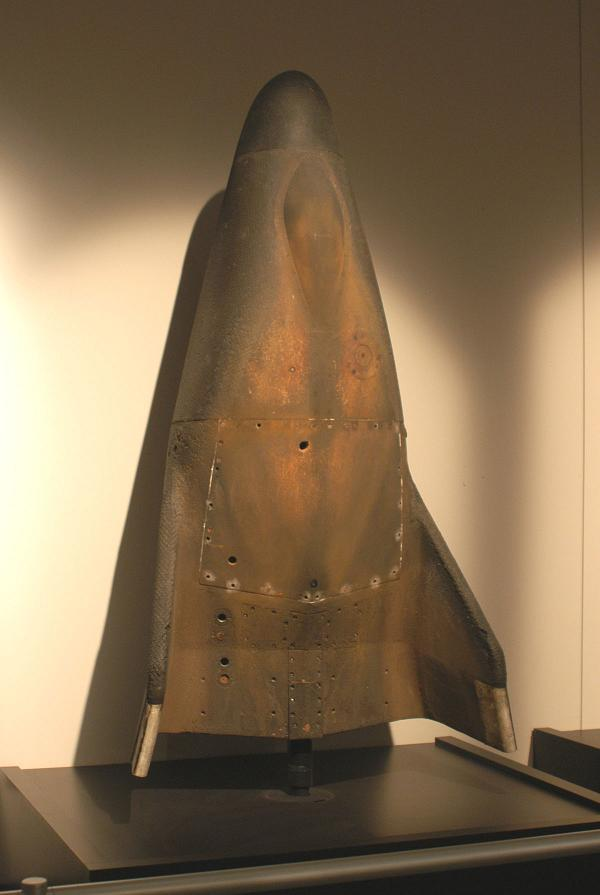
- Preserved X-23A PRIME at USAF Museum, Dayton, Ohio

General information
- Type: Lifting body
- National origin: United States
- Manufacturer: Martin Marietta
- Status: Out of service
- Primary user: United States Air Force
- Number built: 3

History
- First flight: 21 December 1966
- Retired: 19 April 1967
- Variant: Martin Marietta X-24

The Martin X-23A PRIME (Precision Reentry Including Maneuvering reEntry) (SV-5D) is a small lifting-body re-entry vehicle tested by the United States Air Force in the mid-1960s. Unlike ASSET, primarily used for structural and heating research, the X-23A PRIME was developed to study the effects of maneuvering during re-entry of Earth's atmosphere, including cross-range maneuvers up to 617 nmi (710 mi; 1,143 km) from the ballistic track.

== Design ==
Each X-23A was constructed from titanium, beryllium, stainless steel, and aluminum. The craft consisted of two sections—the aft main structure and a removable forward "glove section". The structure was completely covered with a Martin-developed ablative heat shield 0.75 to 2.75 in (19 to 70 mm) thick, and the nose cap was constructed of carbon phenolic material.

Aerodynamic control was provided by a pair of 12 in × 12 in (305 mm × 305 mm) lower flaps, and fixed upper flaps and rudders. A nitrogen-gas reaction control system was used outside the atmosphere. At Mach 2 a drogue ballute deployed and slowed the vehicle's descent. As it deployed, its cable sliced the upper structure of the main equipment bay, allowing a 47 ft (14 m) recovery chute to deploy. It would then be recovered in midair by a specially-equipped JC-130B Hercules aircraft.

== Flight testing ==
The first PRIME vehicle was launched from Vandenberg AFB on 21 December 1966 atop an Atlas SLV-3 launch vehicle. This mission simulated a low Earth orbit reentry with a zero cross-range. The ballute deployed at 99,850 ft (30,434 m), though the recovery parachute failed to completely deploy. The vehicle crashed into the Pacific Ocean.

The second vehicle was launched on 5 March 1967. This flight simulated a 654-mile (1053-kilometre) cross-range reentry, and banking at hypersonic speeds. The recovery parachute deployed properly and was located by two of the deployed recovery aircraft. During an inspection fly-by of the descending parachute system it was seen that reefing cutters had failed to actuate. These cutters are on the harness suspending the vehicle from the parachute to ensure stability of the vehicle behind the JC-130B recovery aircraft during reel-in, and permit safely boarding the vehicle. As a result, the parachute and vehicle were allowed to descend to the sea. Subsequently, the vehicle separated from its flotation "balloon" in the rough seas and, with the parachute, sank before a nearby ship could arrive to retrieve it from the ocean.

The final PRIME mission was flown on 19 April 1967, and simulated re-entry from low Earth orbit with a 617 nmi (710 mi; 1,143 km) cross-range. This time, all systems performed perfectly, and the X-23A was successfully recovered. An inspection by a USAF-Martin team reported the craft "ready to fly again", although no later missions were carried out. The third X-23A is now on display at the National Museum of the United States Air Force at Wright-Patterson Air Force Base in Ohio.

== Specifications (X-23A) ==
Data from The X-planes : X-1 to X-29

General characteristics

- Length: 6 ft 8 in (2.03 m)
- Wingspan: 3 ft 10 in (1.17 m)
- Height: 2 ft 10 in (0.86 m)
- Gross weight: 894 lb (406 kg)
- Powerplant: × Nitrogen gas reaction control thrusters

Performance

- Maximum speed: 14,388 kn (16,557 mph, 26,647 km/h)
- Maximum speed: Mach 25
- Hypersonic L/D Ratio: 1:1

== See also ==
Aircraft of comparable role, configuration, and era

- Molniya BOR-4
- ASSET
