= Orbiting Astronomical Observatory =

Series of American space observatories

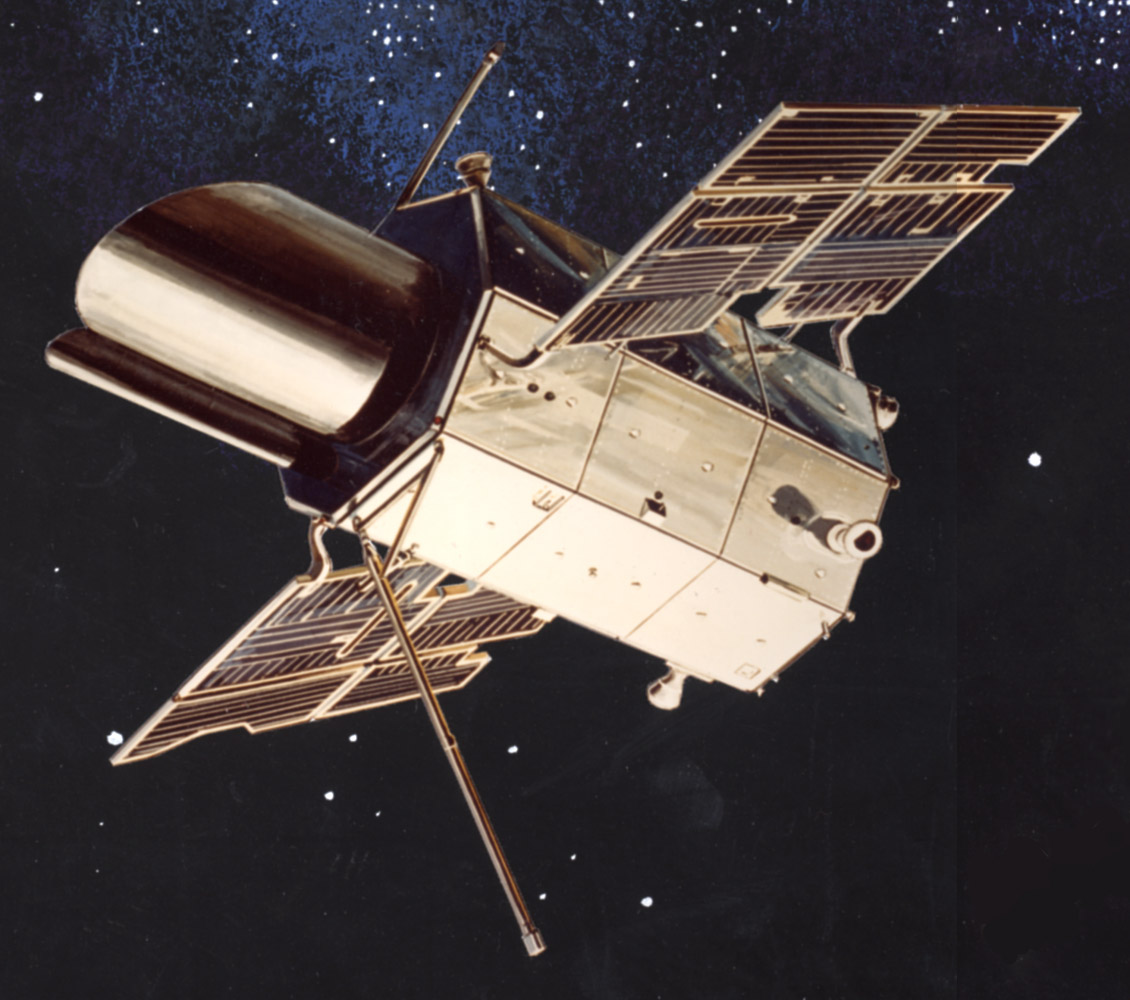
Artist's conception of OAO-1 in orbit

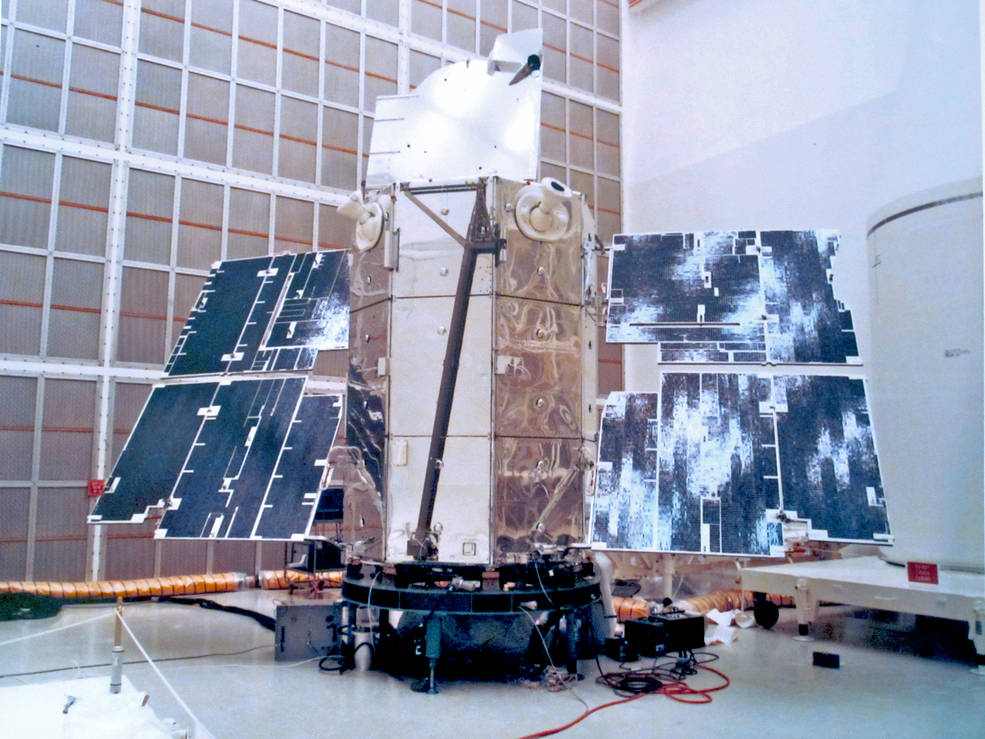
Technicians in a clean room check out the OAO 2 before the mission’s 7 December 1968, launch.

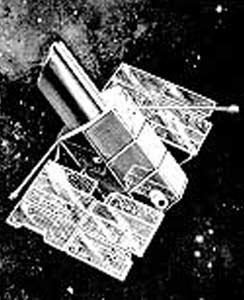
Artist's conception of OAO-B in orbit

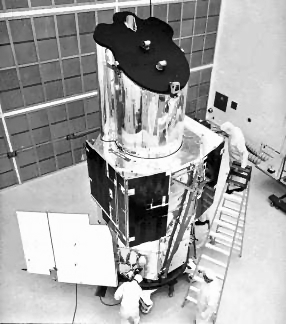
OAO-3 in the clean room

The Orbiting Astronomical Observatory (OAO) satellites were a series of four American space observatories launched by NASA between 1966 and 1972, managed by NASA Chief of Astronomy Nancy Grace Roman. These observatories, including the first successful space telescope, provided the first high-quality observations of many objects in ultraviolet light. Although two OAO missions were failures, the success of the other two increased awareness within the astronomical community of the benefits of space-based observations, and led to the instigation of the Hubble Space Telescope.

== OAO-1 ==
The first Orbiting Astronomical Observatory (OAO or OAO-1) was launched successfully on 8 April 1966, carrying instruments to detect ultraviolet, X-ray and gamma ray emission. Before the instruments could be activated, a power failure resulted in the termination of the mission after three days. The spacecraft was out of control, so that the solar panels could not be deployed to recharge the batteries that would supply power to the electrical and electronic equipment on board. The satellite died and became a derelict object in orbit (SATCAT: 2142, COSPAR: 1966-031A).

== OAO-2 Stargazer ==
Orbiting Astronomical Observatory 2 (OAO-2, nicknamed Stargazer) was launched on 7 December 1968, and carried 11 ultraviolet telescopes. It observed successfully until January 1973, and contributed to many significant astronomical discoveries. Among these were the discovery that comets are surrounded by enormous haloes of hydrogen, several hundred thousand kilometres across, and observations of novae which found that their UV brightness often increased during the decline in their optical brightness.

== OAO-B ==
OAO-B carried a 38 in (97 cm) ultraviolet telescope, and should have provided spectra of fainter objects than had previously been observable. The satellite was launched on 30 November 1970 with "the largest space telescope ever launched", but never made it into orbit. The payload fairing did not separate properly during ascent and the excess weight of it prevented the Centaur stage from achieving orbital velocity. The Centaur and OAO reentered the atmosphere and broke up, destroying a $98,500,000 project. The disaster was later traced to a flaw in a $100 explosive bolt that failed to fire.

== OAO-3 (Copernicus) ==
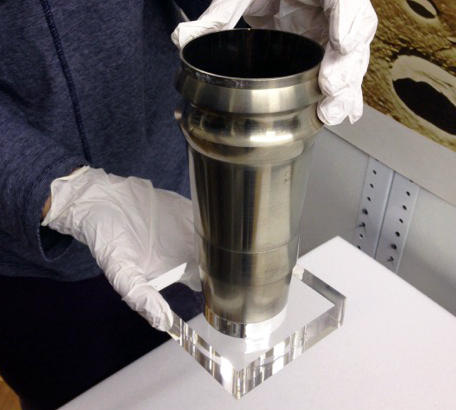
A flight spare of the grazing incidence mirror built for OAO-3 (Copernicus). The mirror was part of the X-ray telescope built by University College London. It is now held in the collections of the Science Museum, London.

OAO-3 was launched on 21 August 1972, and proved to be the most successful of the OAO missions. It was a collaborative effort between NASA and the UK's Science Research Council (currently known as the Science and Engineering Research Council). After its launch, it was named Copernicus to mark the 500th anniversary of the birth of Nicolaus Copernicus in 1473.

Copernicus operated until February 1981, and returned high resolution spectra of hundreds of stars along with extensive X-ray observations. Among the significant discoveries made by Copernicus were the discovery of several long-period pulsars such as X Persei that had rotation times of many minutes instead of the more typical second or less, and confirmation that most of the hydrogen in interstellar gas clouds existed in molecular form.

== Launches ==
- OAO-1: Atlas-Agena D from Launch Complex 12, Cape Canaveral, Florida
- OAO-2, OAO-B and OAO-3: Atlas SLV-3C from Launch Complex 36, Cape Canaveral, Florida

== See also ==
- Timeline of artificial satellites and space probes
- Hubble Space Telescope
