= Atlas SLV-3 =

American launch vehicle manufactured by General Dynamics

- Function: Expendable launch system
- Manufacturer: Convair Division of General Dynamics
- Country of origin: United States

Launch history
- Status: Retired
- Launch sites: Cape Kennedy, LC-14; Vandenberg, SLC-3E
- Total launches: 63
- Success(es): 57
- Failure: 6
- First flight: 1 June 1966
- Last flight: 19 May 1983

The Atlas SLV-3, or SLV-3 Atlas was an American expendable launch system derived from the SM-65 Atlas / SM-65D Atlas missile.

The Atlas SLV-3 was a stage and a half rocket, built as a standardized replacement for earlier Atlas launch systems, which had been derived from the various Atlas missiles.

Most space launcher variants of the Atlas up to 1965 were derived from the D-series Atlas ICBM with custom modifications for the needs of the particular mission. The SLV-3 would use a standardized configuration based on the Atlas D missile for all launches with the exception of different widths for the top of the rocket depending on the upper stage being flown.

The SLV-3 had thicker gauge tank walls to support the weight of upper stages as well as upgraded engines and removal of unneeded ICBM hardware such as retrorockets. Although the main engines had greater thrust, the verniers were detuned slightly in the interest of improved I_{SP} (vacuum specific impulse).

Variants of the SLV-3 flew until 2005 when the legacy Atlas was retired from service and replaced by the Atlas V, a completely new vehicle with conventional aircraft-style construction and different engines.

== Versions ==
The following versions of the launch system were produced:

=== Baseline ===
The standard Atlas-Agena vehicle is best known for launching the Augmented Target Docking Adapter (ATDA) in support of the Gemini 9A mission. This occurred on 1 June 1966, and was the first flight of the Atlas SLV-3 as an independent vehicle. The ATDA failed because the payload shroud did not detach.

The rocket was also used for three suborbital tests of X-23 PRIME reentry vehicles. A leftover SLV-3 from the PRIME program was used to launch a collection of small scientific satellites from VAFB's SLC-3E on August 16, 1968.

Most Atlas-Agena SLV-3s were used for classified DoD payloads, especially KH-7 GAMBIT.

A Burner II upper stage could be used to increase payload.

==== Details ====
- Thrust (pounds): 389,000
- Booster ISP: 252.5
- Sustainer ISP: 214.2
- Vernier ISP: 190.9/237.7
- Main impulse propellants (pounds): 246,549
- Launch weight (pounds): 260,928
- Booster jettison weight (pounds): 7,368
- Sustainer jettison weight (pounds): 6,569

==== Gallery ====
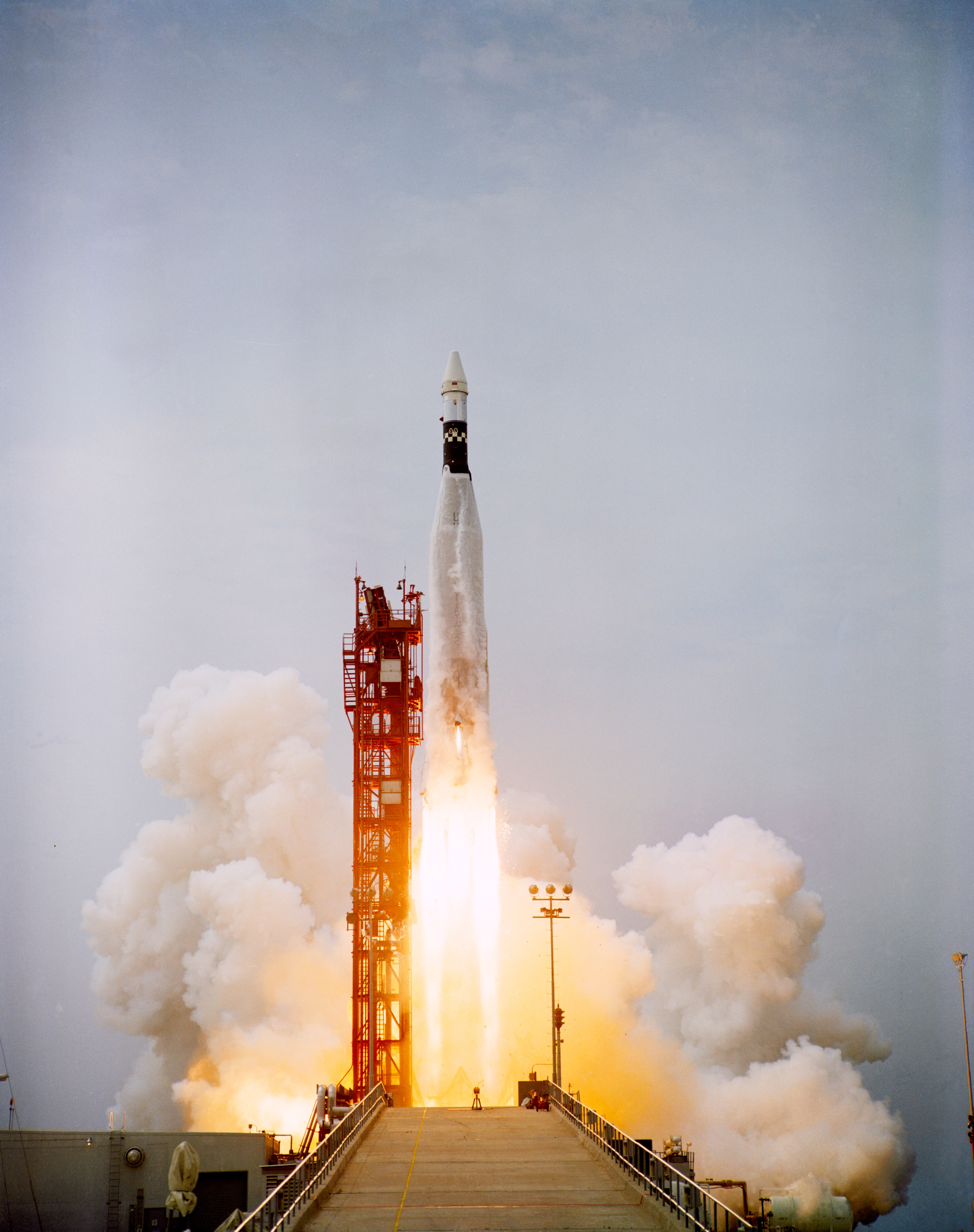
ATDA launch, June 1, 1966 (Atlas 5304)

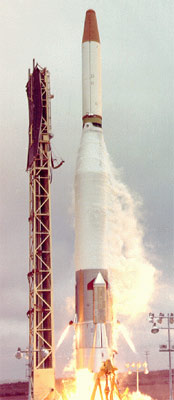
PRIME launch, August 16, 1968 (Atlas 7004)

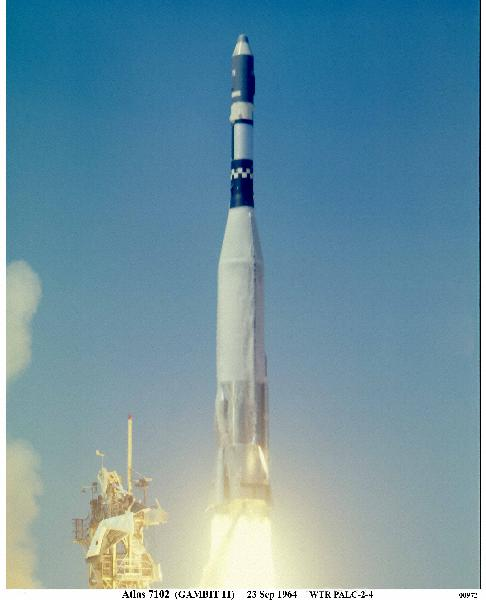
KH-7 11 launch, 23 September 1964 (Atlas 7102)

=== SLV-3A ===
SLV-3A was the baseline SLV-3 with extended propellant tanks for longer burn time. It was used to launch OGO 5 in 1968, all remaining launches being classified Aquacade (Canyon/Rhyolite) SIGINT satellites. All launches took place from LC-13 at Cape Canaveral.

==== Details ====
- Thrust (pounds): 395,000
- Booster ISP: 258.9/296.8
- Sustainer ISP: 215.3/308.9
- Vernier ISP: 190.9/237.7
- Main impulse propellants (pounds): 295,356
- Launch weight (pounds): 310,073
- Booster jettison weight (pounds): 7,464
- Sustainer jettison weight (pounds): 6,805
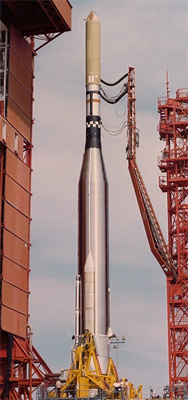
Rhyolite 3 - Aquacade 3 launch (Atlas 5504A)

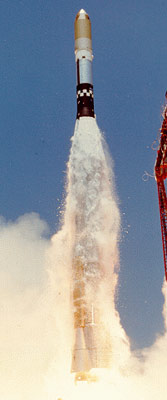
Canyon 7 launch (Atlas 5507A)

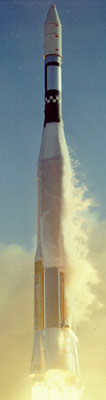
OGO 5 launch (Atlas 5602A)

=== SLV-3B ===
SLV-3B was a one-off Atlas used to launch the first OAO satellite, which consisted of the SLV-3C Atlas with the Agena and payload enclosed in a full-width fairing. The configuration was launched once, on August 4, 1966, from Cape Canaveral Launch Complex 12 to deliver the OAO satellite to orbit.

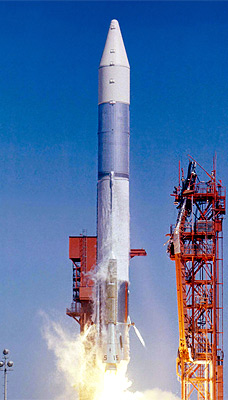
OAO-1 launch (Atlas 5001)

=== SLV-3C ===
SLV-3C was the standard Atlas-Centaur booster, without the tapered forward section to accommodate the smaller Agena stage. The Atlas Centaur effort started in 1958 at the Advanced Research Projects Agency. On establishment of NASA, the effort transferred to NASA and ultimately under the auspices of the NASA Lewis Research Center. General Dynamics Convair division was contracted to make modifications to the Atlas booster and design the cryogenic Centaur upper stage with the engines for the upper stage being furnished as Government Furnished Equipment via a separate contract between the U.S. Government and Pratt & Whitney.

Atlas Centaur (SLV-3C) was designed to deliver the Surveyor moon lander missions to soft landings on the lunar surface as part of the buildup for the Apollo program.

==== Gallery ====
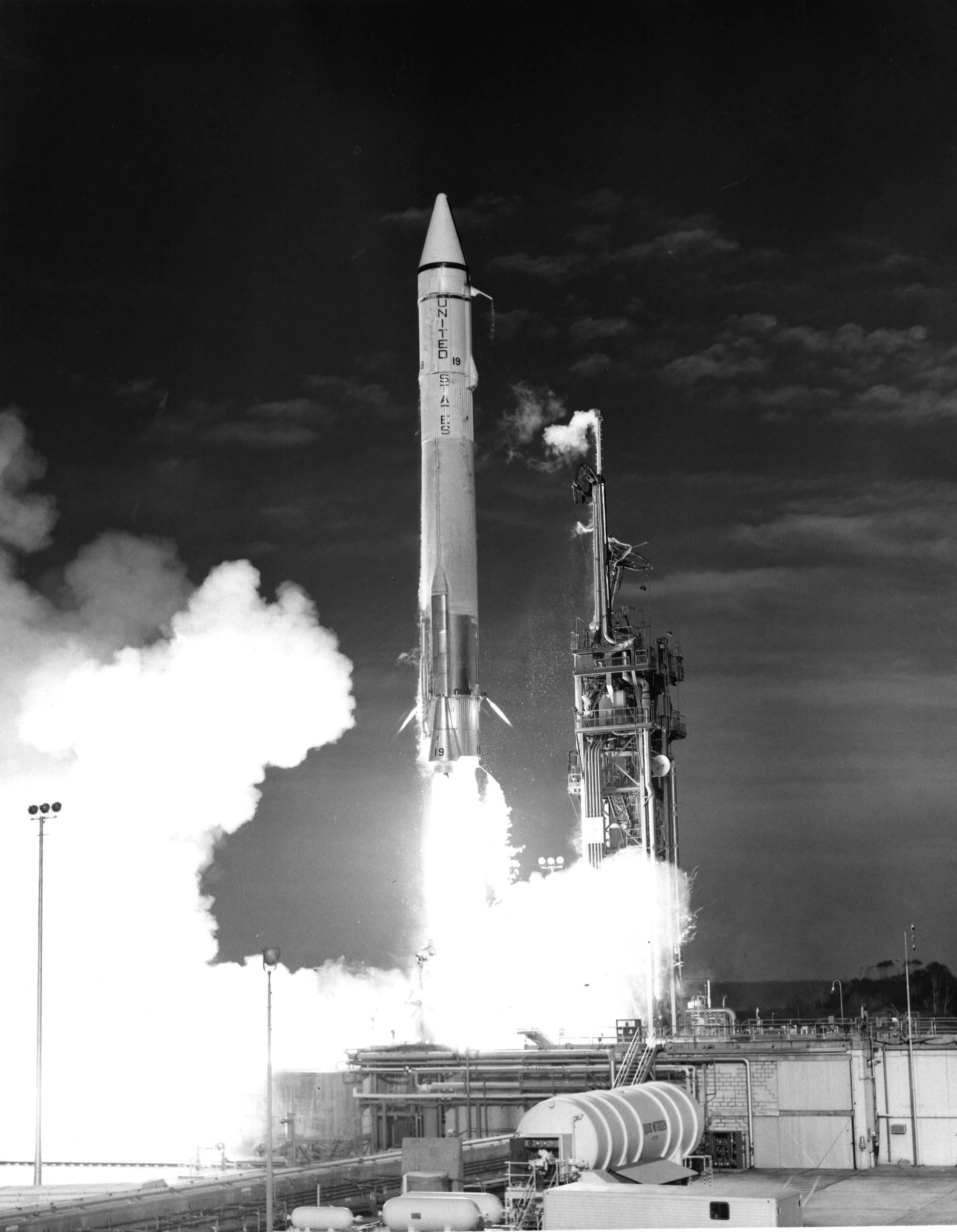
Mariner 7 launch (AC-19)

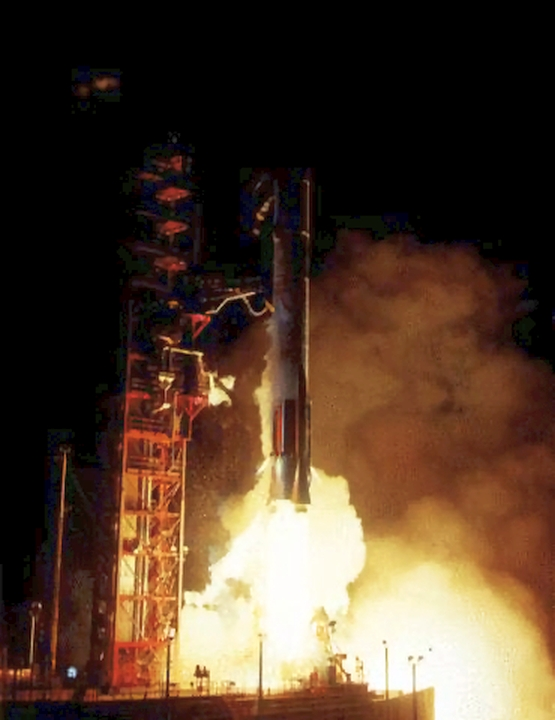
Surveyor 6 launch (AC-14)

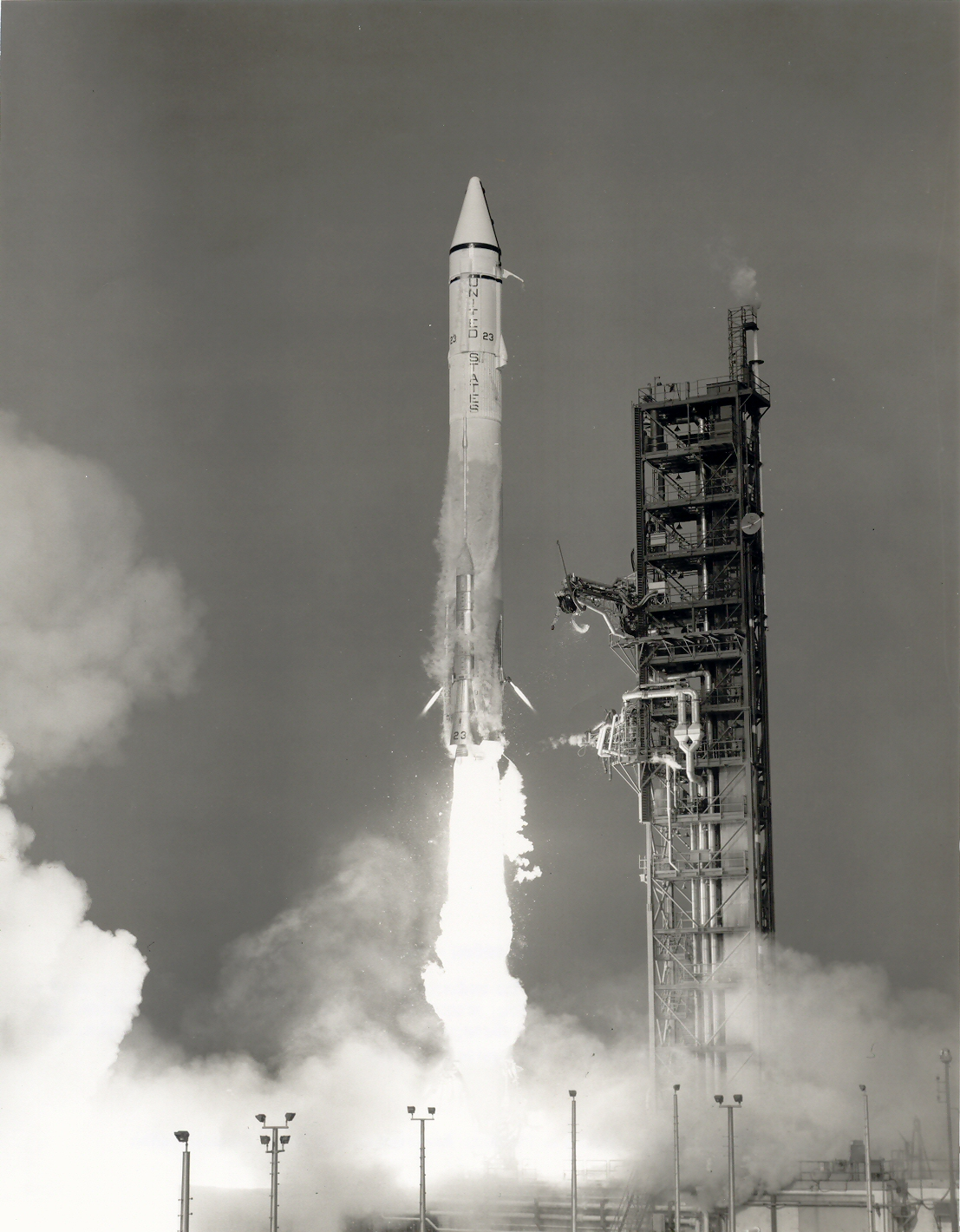
Mariner 9 launch (AC-26)

=== Atlas SLV-3D ===
SLV-3D had the same Atlas core as SLV-3C, with an enhanced Centaur stage. The SLV-3D model used an upgraded Centaur D1A to launch the Pioneer 11 spacecraft to Jupiter and Saturn. It was also used to launch four U.S. Navy FLTSATCOM communications satellites to geosynchronous transfer orbit.

==== Gallery ====
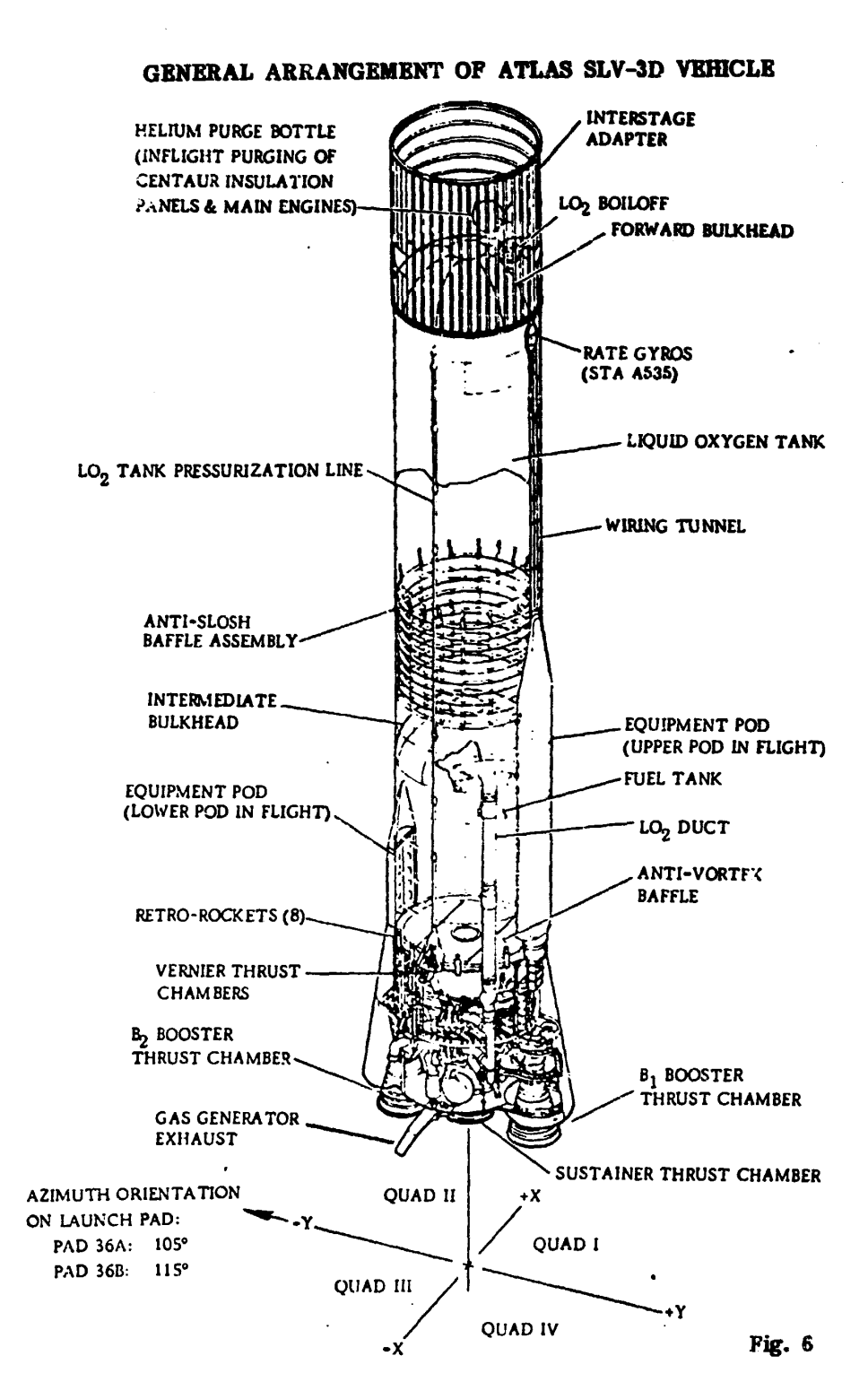
Atlas SLV-3D diagram

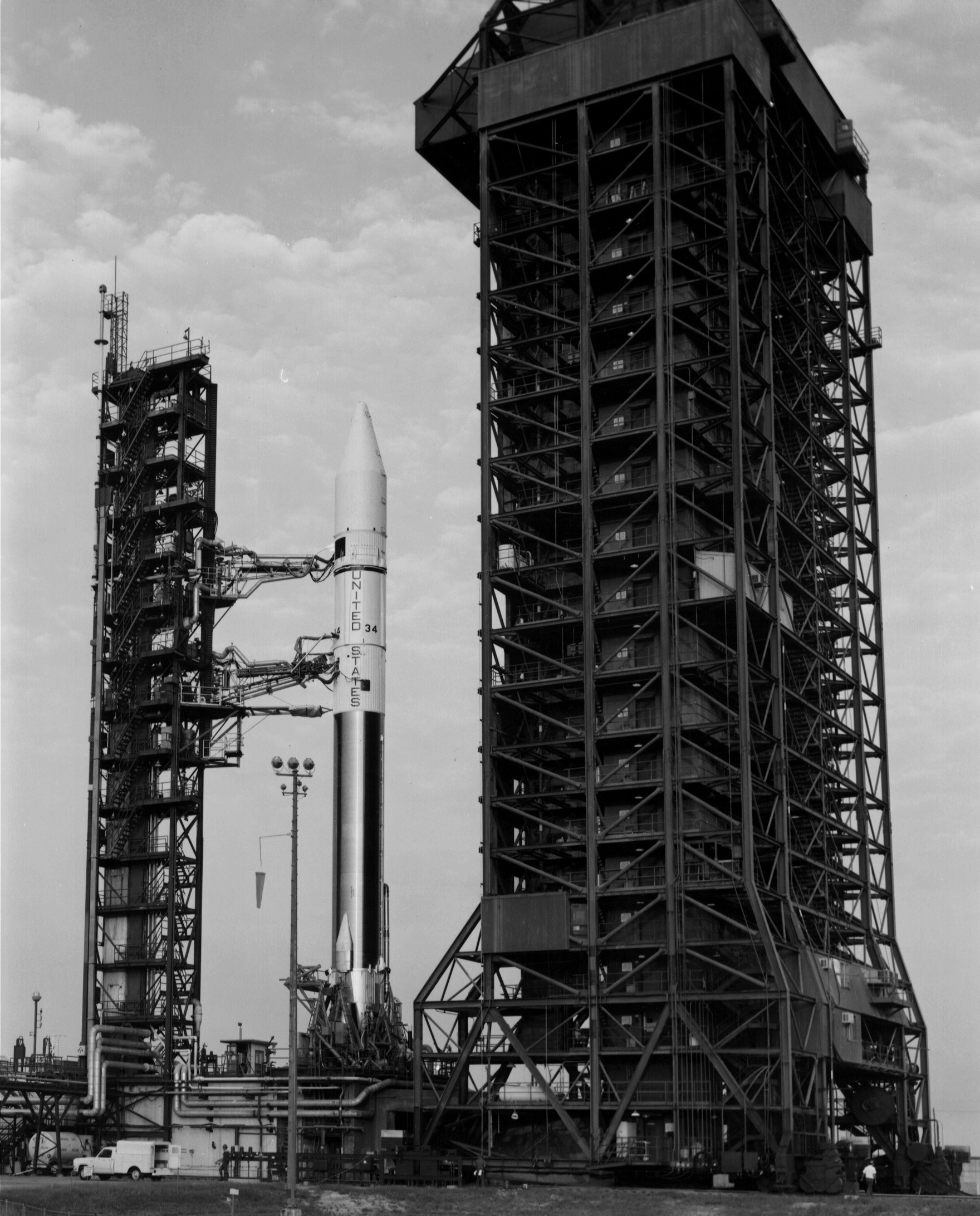
Mariner 10 launch (AC-34)

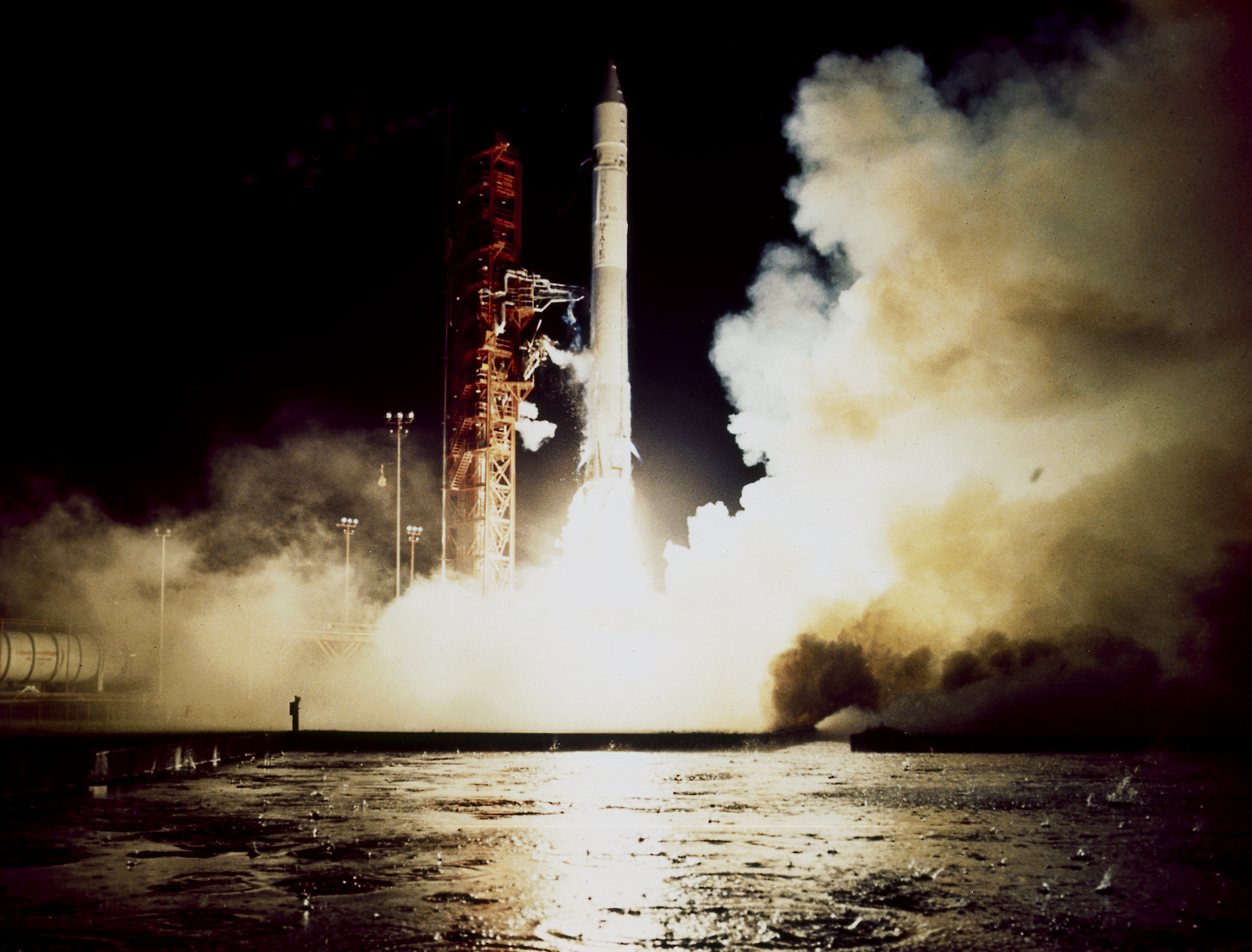
Pioneer 11 launch (AC-30)
