= List of Kosmos launches =

This is a list of launches made by the Kosmos rocket family, including both the R-12 and R-14 missiles derived versions.

To summarize, of the R-12-derived missile a total number of 164 were launched between 1961 and 1977 (including 20 failures). Of the R-14-derived missile a total number of 462 were launched between 1964 and 2010 (including 24 failures).

== R-12-based version launches history ==
Date/time (UTC)	Configuration	Serial number	Launch site	Outcome
Date/time (UTC)	Payload	Separation orbit	Operator	Function
Date/time (UTC)	Remarks			
=== 1961 ===
27 October 1961; 16:30	Kosmos 63S1		Kapustin Yar Mayak-2	Failure
27 October 1961; 16:30	DS-1	Low Earth (planned)		Technology
27 October 1961; 16:30	Flight control system failure			
21 December 1961; 12:30	Kosmos 63S1		Kapustin Yar Mayak-2	Failure
21 December 1961; 12:30	DS-1	Low Earth (planned)		Technology
21 December 1961; 12:30	Second stage premature cut-off due to more-than-designed LOX evaporation rate.			
=== 1962 ===
16 March 1962; 11:59	Kosmos 63S1		Kapustin Yar Mayak-2	Successful
16 March 1962; 11:59	Kosmos 1 (DS-2)	Low Earth		Technology
6 April 1962; 17:15	Kosmos 63S1		Kapustin Yar Mayak-2	Successful
6 April 1962; 17:15	Kosmos 2 (1MS)	Low Earth		Technology
24 April 1962; 04:00	Kosmos 63S1		Kapustin Yar Mayak-2	Successful
24 April 1962; 04:00	Kosmos 3 (2MS)	Low Earth		Technology
28 May 1962; 03:00	Kosmos 63S1		Kapustin Yar Mayak-2	Successful
28 May 1962; 03:00	Kosmos 5 (2MS)	Low Earth		Technology
30 June 1962; 16:00	Kosmos 63S1		Kapustin Yar Mayak-2	Successful
30 June 1962; 16:00	Kosmos 6 (DS-P1)	Low Earth		Radar calibration
18 August 1962; 15:00	Kosmos 63S1		Kapustin Yar Mayak-2	Successful
18 August 1962; 15:00	Kosmos 8 (DS-K-8)	Low Earth		ELINT
20 October 1962; 04:00	Kosmos 63S1		Kapustin Yar Mayak-2	Successful
20 October 1962; 04:00	Kosmos 11 (DS-A1)	Low Earth		Technology
25 October 1962; 07:00	Kosmos 63S1		Kapustin Yar Mayak-2	Failure
25 October 1962; 07:00	1MS	Low Earth (planned)		Technology
=== 1963 ===
6 April 1963; 03:01	Kosmos 63S1		Kapustin Yar Mayak-2	Failure
6 April 1963; 03:01	DS-P1	Low Earth (planned)		Radar calibration
13 April 1963; 11:00	Kosmos 63S1		Kapustin Yar Mayak-2	Successful
13 April 1963; 11:00	Kosmos 14 (Omega)	Low Earth		Technology
22 May 1963; 03:00	Kosmos 63S1		Kapustin Yar Mayak-2	Successful
22 May 1963; 03:00	Kosmos 17 (DS-A1)	Low Earth		Technology
1 June 1963; 02:50	Kosmos 63S1		Kapustin Yar Mayak-2	Failure
1 June 1963; 02:50	DS-MT	Low Earth (planned)		Technology
6 August 1963; 06:07	Kosmos 63S1		Kapustin Yar Mayak-2	Successful
6 August 1963; 06:07	Kosmos 19 (DS-P1)	Low Earth		Radar calibration
22 August 1963; 06:00	Kosmos 63S1		Kapustin Yar Mayak-2	Failure
22 August 1963; 06:00	DS-A1	Low Earth (planned)		Technology
24 October 1963; 04:30	Kosmos 63S1		Kapustin Yar Mayak-2	Failure
24 October 1963; 04:30	DS-A1	Low Earth (planned)		Technology
13 December 1963; 14:15	Kosmos 63S1		Kapustin Yar Mayak-2	Successful
13 December 1963; 14:15	Kosmos 23 (Omega)	Low Earth		Technology
=== 1964 ===
27 February 1964; 13:30	Kosmos 63S1		Kapustin Yar Mayak-2	Successful
27 February 1964; 13:30	Kosmos 25 (DS-P1)	Low Earth		Radar calibration
18 March 1964; 15:07	Kosmos 63S1		Kapustin Yar Mayak-2	Successful
18 March 1964; 15:07	Kosmos 26 (DS-MG)	Low Earth		Technology
6 June 1964; 06:00	Kosmos 63S1		Kapustin Yar Mayak-2	Successful
6 June 1964; 06:00	Kosmos 31 (DS-MT)	Low Earth		Technology
30 July 1964; 03:36	Kosmos 63S1		Kapustin Yar Mayak-2	Successful
30 July 1964; 03:36	Kosmos 36 (DS-P1-Yu)	Low Earth		Radar Calibration
22 August 1964; 11:00	Kosmos 63S1		Kapustin Yar Mayak-2	Successful
22 August 1964; 11:00	Kosmos 42/Kosmos 43 (Strela-1)	Low Earth		Communication
24 October 1964; 05:17	Kosmos 63S1		Kapustin Yar Mayak-2	Successful
24 October 1964; 05:17	Kosmos 49 (DS-MG)	Low Earth		Technology
1 December 1964; 08:45	Kosmos 63S1		Kapustin Yar Site 86/1	Failure
1 December 1964; 08:45	DS-2	Low Earth (planned)		Technology
9 December 1964; 23:00	Kosmos 63S1		Kapustin Yar Site 86/1	Successful
9 December 1964; 23:00	Kosmos 51 (DS-MT)	Low Earth		Technology
=== 1965 ===
30 January 1965; 09:36	Kosmos 63S1		Kapustin Yar Site 86/1	Successful
30 January 1965; 09:36	Kosmos 53 (DS-A1)	Low Earth		Technology
12 February 1965; 12:00	Kosmos 63S1		Kapustin Yar Site 86/1	Failure
12 February 1965; 12:00	DS-P1-Yu	Low Earth (planned)		Radar calibration
20 February 1965; 06:30	Kosmos 63S1		Kapustin Yar Site 86/1	Failure
20 February 1965; 06:30	DS-A1	Low Earth (planned)		Technology
2 July 1965; 06:29	Kosmos 63S1		Kapustin Yar Site 86/1	Successful
2 July 1965; 06:29	Kosmos 70 (DS-A1)	Low Earth		Technology
23 July 1965; 04:34	Kosmos 63S1		Kapustin Yar Site 86/1	Successful
23 July 1965; 04:34	Kosmos 76 (DS-P1-Yu)	Low Earth		Radar calibration
19 October 1965; 05:44	Kosmos-2		Kapustin Yar Site 86/1	Successful
19 October 1965; 05:44	Kosmos 93 (DS-U2-V)	Low Earth		Ionosphere research
4 November 1965; 05:31	Kosmos-2		Kapustin Yar Site 86/1	Successful
4 November 1965; 05:31	Kosmos 95 (DS-U2-V)	Low Earth		Ionosphere research
26 November 1965; 12:14	Kosmos-2		Kapustin Yar Site 86/1	Successful
26 November 1965; 12:14	Kosmos 97 (DS-U2-M)	Low Earth		Technology
21 December 1965; 06:14	Kosmos 63S1		Kapustin Yar Site 86/1	Successful
21 December 1965; 06:14	Kosmos 101 (DS-P1-Yu)	Low Earth		Radar calibration
28 December 1965; 08:10	Kosmos 63S1		Kapustin Yar Site 86/1	Failure
28 December 1965; 08:10	DS-K-40	Low Earth (planned)		ELINT
=== 1966 ===
25 January 1966; 12:28	Kosmos-2		Kapustin Yar Site 86/1	Successful
25 January 1966; 12:28	Kosmos 106 (DS-P1-I)	Low Earth		Radar calibration
11 February 1966; 18:00	Kosmos 63S1		Kapustin Yar Site 86/1	Successful
11 February 1966; 18:00	Kosmos 108 (DS-U1-G)	Low Earth		Atmospheric research
21 February 1966; 13:30	Kosmos 63S1		Kapustin Yar Site 86/1	Failure
21 February 1966; 13:30	DS-K-40	Low Earth (planned)		ELINT
26 April 1966; 10:04	Kosmos-2		Kapustin Yar Site 86/1	Successful
26 April 1966; 10:04	Kosmos 116 (DS-P1-Yu)	Low Earth		Radar calibration
24 May 1966; 05:31	Kosmos-2		Kapustin Yar Site 86/1	Successful
24 May 1966; 05:31	Kosmos 119 (DS-U2-I)	Low Earth		Ionosphere research
8 July 1966; 05:31	Kosmos 63S1		Kapustin Yar Site 86/1	Successful
8 July 1966; 05:31	Kosmos 123 (DS-P1-Yu)	Low Earth		Radar calibration
12 December 1966; 20:38	Kosmos-2		Kapustin Yar Site 86/1	Successful
12 December 1966; 20:38	Kosmos 135 (DS-U2-MP)	Low Earth		Space environment research
21 December 1966; 13:12	Kosmos 63S1		Kapustin Yar Site 86/1	Successful
21 December 1966; 13:12	Kosmos 137 (DS-U2-D)	Low Earth		Magnetosphere research
=== 1967 ===
14 February 1967; 10:04	Kosmos-2		Kapustin Yar Site 86/1	Successful
14 February 1967; 10:04	Kosmos 142 (DS-U2-I)	Low Earth		Ionosphere research
3 March 1967; 06:44	Kosmos-2		Kapustin Yar Site 86/1	Successful
3 March 1967; 06:44	Kosmos 145 (DS-U2-M)	Low Earth		Technology
16 March 1967; 17:30	Kosmos-2		Plesetsk Site 133/1	Successful
16 March 1967; 17:30	Kosmos 148 (DS-P1-I)	Low Earth		Radar calibration
21 March 1967; 10:07	Kosmos-2		Kapustin Yar Site 86/1	Successful
21 March 1967; 10:07	Kosmos 149 (DS-MO)	Low Earth		Technology
25 March 1967; 06:59	Kosmos-2		Plesetsk Site 133/1	Successful
25 March 1967; 06:59	Kosmos 152 (DS-P1-Yu)	Low Earth		Radar calibration
5 June 1967; 05:03	Kosmos-2		Kapustin Yar Site 86/1	Successful
5 June 1967; 05:03	Kosmos 163 (DS-U2-MP)	Low Earth		Space environment research
12 June 1967; 18:06	Kosmos-2		Plesetsk Site 133/1	Successful
12 June 1967; 18:06	Kosmos 165 (DS-P1-Yu)	Low Earth		Radar calibration
16 June 1967; 04:44	Kosmos-2		Kapustin Yar Site 86/1	Successful
16 June 1967; 04:44	Kosmos 166 (DS-U3-S)	Low Earth		Solar astronomy
24 August 1967; 04:59	Kosmos-2		Plesetsk Site 133/1	Successful
24 August 1967; 04:59	Kosmos 173 (DS-P1-Yu)	Low Earth		Radar calibration
12 September 1967; 17:00	Kosmos-2		Plesetsk Site 133/1	Successful
12 September 1967; 17:00	Kosmos 176 (DS-P1-Yu)	Low Earth		Radar calibration
21 November 1967; 14:29	Kosmos-2		Plesetsk Site 133/1	Successful
21 November 1967; 14:29	Kosmos 191 (DS-P1-Yu)	Low Earth		Radar calibration
19 December 1967; 06:30	Kosmos 63S1		Kapustin Yar Site 86/1	Successful
19 December 1967; 06:30	Kosmos 196 (DS-U1-G)	Low Earth		Atmospheric research
26 December 1967; 09:02	Kosmos-2		Kapustin Yar Site 86/4	Successful
26 December 1967; 09:02	Kosmos 197 (DS-U2-V)	Low Earth		Ionosphere research
=== 1968 ===
20 February 1968; 10:03	Kosmos-2		Kapustin Yar Site 86/4	Successful
20 February 1968; 10:03	Kosmos 202 (DS-U2-V)	Low Earth		Ionosphere research
5 March 1968; 11:20	Kosmos-2		Plesetsk Site 133/1	Successful
5 March 1968; 11:20	Kosmos 204 (DS-P1-I)	Low Earth		Radar calibration
6 March 1968; 11:02	Kosmos-2		Kapustin Yar Site 86/4	Failure
6 March 1968; 11:02	DS-U1-Ya	Low Earth (planned)		Magnetosphere research
9 April 1968; 11:26	Kosmos-2		Plesetsk Site 133/1	Successful
9 April 1968; 11:26	Kosmos 211 (DS-P1-Yu)	Low Earth		Radar calibration
18 April 1968; 22:29	Kosmos-2		Kapustin Yar Site 86/4	Successful
18 April 1968; 22:29	Kosmos 215 (DS-U1-A)	Low Earth		Astronomy
26 April 1968; 04:42	Kosmos-2		Kapustin Yar Site 86/4	Successful
26 April 1968; 04:42	Kosmos 219 (DS-U2-D)	Low Earth		Magnetosphere research
24 May 1968; 07:04	Kosmos-2		Kapustin Yar Site 86/4	Successful
24 May 1968; 07:04	Kosmos 221 (DS-P1-Yu)	Low Earth		Radar calibration
30 May 1968; 20:29	Kosmos-2		Plesetsk Site 133/1	Successful
30 May 1968; 20:29	Kosmos 222 (DS-P1-Yu)	Low Earth		Radar calibration
11 June 1968; 21:29	Kosmos-2		Kapustin Yar Site 86/4	Successful
11 June 1968; 21:29	Kosmos 225 (DS-U1-Ya)	Low Earth		Magnetosphere research
5 July 1968; 06:59	Kosmos-2		Kapustin Yar Site 86/4	Successful
5 July 1968; 06:59	Kosmos 230 (DS-U3-S)	Low Earth		Solar astronomy
18 July 1968; 19:59	Kosmos-2		Plesetsk Site 133/1	Successful
18 July 1968; 19:59	Kosmos 233 (DS-P1-Yu)	Low Earth		Radar calibration
20 September 1968; 14:40	Kosmos-2		Plesetsk Site 133/1	Successful
20 September 1968; 14:40	Kosmos 242 (DS-P1-I)	Low Earth		Radar calibration
3 October 1968; 12:59	Kosmos-2		Plesetsk Site 133/1	Successful
3 October 1968; 12:59	Kosmos 245 (DS-P1-Yu)	Low Earth		Radar calibration
3 December 1968; 14:52	Kosmos-2		Plesetsk Site 133/1	Successful
3 December 1968; 14:52	Kosmos 257 (DS-P1-Yu)	Low Earth		Radar calibration
14 December 1968; 05:09	Kosmos-2		Kapustin Yar Site 86/4	Successful
14 December 1968; 05:09	Kosmos 259 (DS-U2-I)	Low Earth		Ionosphere research
19 December 1968; 23:55	Kosmos-2		Plesetsk Site 133/1	Successful
19 December 1968; 23:55	Kosmos 261 (DS-U2-GK)	Low Earth		Magnetosphere research
26 December 1968; 09:45	Kosmos-2		Kapustin Yar Site 86/4	Successful
26 December 1968; 09:45	Kosmos 262 (DS-U2-GF)	Low Earth		Solar astronomy
=== 1969 ===
7 February 1969; 13:59	Kosmos-2		Plesetsk Site 133/1	Successful
7 February 1969; 13:59	Kosmos 265 (DS-P1-Yu)	Low Earth		Radar calibration
5 March 1969; 13:04	Kosmos-2		Kapustin Yar Site 86/4	Successful
5 March 1969; 13:04	Kosmos 268 (DS-P1-Yu)	Low Earth		Radar calibration
28 March 1969; 16:00	Kosmos-2		Plesetsk Site 133/1	Successful
28 March 1969; 16:00	Kosmos 275 (DS-P1-I)	Low Earth		Radar calibration
4 April 1969; 13:00	Kosmos-2		Plesetsk Site 133/1	Successful
4 April 1969; 13:00	Kosmos 277 (DS-P1-Yu)	Low Earth		Radar calibration
27 May 1969; 13:00	Kosmos-2		Plesetsk Site 133/1	Successful
27 May 1969; 13:00	Kosmos 283 (DS-P1-Yu)	Low Earth		Radar calibration
3 June 1969; 12:57	Kosmos-2		Plesetsk Site 133/1	Successful
3 June 1969; 12:57	Kosmos 285 (DS-P1-Yu)	Low Earth		Radar calibration
23 July 1969; 09:00	Kosmos-2		Plesetsk Site 133/1	Failure
23 July 1969; 09:00	DS-P1-Yu	Low Earth (planned)		Radar calibration
22 August 1969; 14:14	Kosmos-2		Plesetsk Site 133/1	Successful
22 August 1969; 14:14	Kosmos 295 (DS-P1-Yu)	Low Earth		Radar calibration
14 October 1969; 13:19	Kosmos-2		Kapustin Yar Site 86/4	Successful
14 October 1969; 13:19	Interkosmos 1 (DS-U3-IK)	Low Earth		Solar astronomy
18 October 1969; 10:00	Kosmos-2		Plesetsk Site 133/1	Successful
18 October 1969; 10:00	Kosmos 303 (DS-P1-Yu)	Low Earth		Radar calibration
24 October 1969; 13:01	Kosmos-2		Kapustin Yar Site 86/4	Successful
24 October 1969; 13:01	Kosmos 307 (DS-P1-Yu)	Low Earth		Radar calibration
4 November 1969; 12:00	Kosmos-2		Plesetsk Site 133/1	Successful
4 November 1969; 12:00	Kosmos 308 (DS-P1-I)	Low Earth		Radar calibration
24 November 1969; 11:00	Kosmos-2		Plesetsk Site 133/1	Successful
24 November 1969; 11:00	Kosmos 311 (DS-P1-Yu)	Low Earth		Radar calibration
11 December 1969; 12:59	Kosmos-2		Plesetsk Site 133/1	Successful
11 December 1969; 12:59	Kosmos 314 (DS-P1-Yu)	Low Earth		Radar calibration
25 December 1969; 09:59	Kosmos-2		Kapustin Yar Site 86/4	Successful
25 December 1969; 09:59	Interkosmos 2 (DS-U1-IK)	Low Earth		Ionosphere research
=== 1970 ===
15 January 1970; 13:40	Kosmos-2		Plesetsk Site 133/1	Successful
15 January 1970; 13:40	Kosmos 319 (DS-P1-Yu)	Low Earth		Radar calibration
16 January 1970; 11:00	Kosmos-2		Kapustin Yar Site 86/4	Successful
16 January 1970; 11:00	Kosmos 320 (DS-MO)	Low Earth		Technology
20 January 1970; 20:20	Kosmos-2		Plesetsk Site 133/1	Successful
20 January 1970; 20:20	Kosmos 321 (DS-U2-MG)	Low Earth		Magnetosphere research
30 January 1970; 15:40	Kosmos-2		Plesetsk Site 133/1	Failure
30 January 1970; 15:40	DS-P1-I	Low Earth (planned)		Radar calibration
27 February 1970; 17:24	Kosmos-2		Plesetsk Site 133/1	Successful
27 February 1970; 17:24	Kosmos 324 (DS-P1-Yu)	Low Earth		Radar calibration
18 March 1970; 14:39	Kosmos-2		Plesetsk Site 133/1	Successful
18 March 1970; 14:39	Kosmos 327 (DS-P1-I)	Low Earth		Radar calibration
23 April 1970; 13:20	Kosmos-2		Plesetsk Site 133/1	Successful
23 April 1970; 13:20	Kosmos 334 (DS-P1-Yu)	Low Earth		Radar calibration
24 April 1970; 22:24	Kosmos-2		Kapustin Yar Site 86/4	Successful
24 April 1970; 22:24	Kosmos 335 (DS-U1-R)	Low Earth		Atmosphere research
22 May 1970; 12:39	Kosmos-2		Plesetsk Site 133/1	Failure
22 May 1970; 12:39	DS-P1-Yu	Low Earth (planned)		Radar calibration
12 June 1970; 09:30	Kosmos-2		Kapustin Yar Site 86/4	Successful
12 June 1970; 09:30	Kosmos 347 (DS-P1-Yu)	Low Earth		Radar calibration
13 June 1970; 05:00	Kosmos-2		Plesetsk Site 133/1	Successful
13 June 1970; 05:00	Kosmos 348 (DS-U2-GK)	Low Earth		Magnetosphere research
27 June 1970; 07:39	Kosmos-2		Plesetsk Site 133/1	Successful
27 June 1970; 07:39	Kosmos 351 (DS-P1-Yu)	Low Earth		Radar calibration
7 August 1970; 09:59	Kosmos-2		Kapustin Yar Site 86/4	Successful
7 August 1970; 09:59	Interkosmos 3 (DS-U2-IK)	Low Earth		Ionosphere research
10 August 1970; 19:59	Kosmos-2		Plesetsk Site 133/1	Successful
10 August 1970; 19:59	Kosmos 356 (DS-U2-MG)	Low Earth		Magnetosphere research
19 August 1970; 14:59	Kosmos-2		Plesetsk Site 133/1	Successful
19 August 1970; 14:59	Kosmos 357 (DS-P1-Yu)	Low Earth		Radar calibration
16 September 1970; 11:59	Kosmos-2		Plesetsk Site 133/1	Successful
16 September 1970; 11:59	Kosmos 362 (DS-P1-I)	Low Earth		Radar calibration
8 October 1970; 15:10	Kosmos-2		Plesetsk Site 133/1	Successful
8 October 1970; 15:10	Kosmos 369 (DS-P1-Yu)	Low Earth		Radar calibration
14 October 1970; 11:30	Kosmos-2		Kapustin Yar Site 86/4	Successful
14 October 1970; 11:30	Interkosmos 4 (DS-U3-IK)	Low Earth		Solar astronomy
24 November 1970; 10:59	Kosmos-2		Plesetsk Site 133/1	Successful
24 November 1970; 10:59	Kosmos 380 (DS-P1-Yu)	Low Earth		Radar calibration
18 December 1970; 09:39	Kosmos-2		Plesetsk Site 133/1	Successful
18 December 1970; 09:39	Kosmos 388 (DS-P1-Yu)	Low Earth		Radar calibration
=== 1971 ===
14 January 1971; 12:00	Kosmos-2		Plesetsk Site 133/1	Successful
14 January 1971; 12:00	Kosmos 391 (DS-P1-I)	Low Earth		Radar calibration
26 January 1971; 12:44	Kosmos-2		Plesetsk Site 133/1	Successful
26 January 1971; 12:44	Kosmos 393 (DS-P1-Yu)	Low Earth		Radar calibration
5 March 1971; 12:00	Kosmos-2		Kapustin Yar Site 86/4	Failure
5 March 1971; 12:00	DS-P1-Yu	Low Earth (planned)		Radar calibration
24 April 1971; 11:15	Kosmos-2		Plesetsk Site 133/1	Successful
24 April 1971; 11:15	Kosmos 408 (DS-P1-Yu)	Low Earth		Radar calibration
19 May 1971; 10:20	Kosmos-2		Plesetsk Site 133/1	Successful
19 May 1971; 10:20	Kosmos 421 (DS-P1-Yu)	Low Earth		Radar calibration
27 May 1971; 11:59	Kosmos-2		Plesetsk Site 133/1	Successful
27 May 1971; 11:59	Kosmos 423 (DS-P1-Yu)	Low Earth		Radar calibration
3 August 1971; 11:00	Kosmos-2		Plesetsk Site 133/1	Failure
3 August 1971; 11:00	DS-P1-Yu	Low Earth (planned)		Radar calibration
27 August 1971; 10:54	Kosmos-2		Plesetsk Site 133/1	Successful
27 August 1971; 10:54	Kosmos 435 (DS-P1-Yu)	Low Earth		Radar calibration
24 September 1971; 10:30	Kosmos-2		Plesetsk Site 133/1	Successful
24 September 1971; 10:30	Kosmos 440 (DS-P1-I)	Low Earth		Radar calibration
19 October 1971; 12:40	Kosmos-2		Plesetsk Site 133/1	Successful
19 October 1971; 12:40	Kosmos 453 (DS-P1-Yu)	Low Earth		Radar calibration
17 November 1971; 11:09	Kosmos-2		Plesetsk Site 133/1	Successful
17 November 1971; 11:09	Kosmos 455 (DS-P1-Yu)	Low Earth		Radar calibration
29 November 1971; 10:09	Kosmos-2		Plesetsk Site 133/1	Successful
29 November 1971; 10:09	Kosmos 458 (DS-P1-Yu)	Low Earth		Radar calibration
2 December 1971; 08:25	Kosmos-2		Kapustin Yar Site 86/4	Successful
2 December 1971; 08:25	Interkosmos 5 (DS-U2-IK)	Low Earth		Ionosphere research
17 December 1971; 10:39	Kosmos-2		Plesetsk Site 133/1	Successful
17 December 1971; 10:39	Kosmos 467 (DS-P1-Yu)	Low Earth		Radar calibration
=== 1972 ===
25 January 1972; 11:15	Kosmos-2		Plesetsk Site 133/1	Successful
25 January 1972; 11:15	Kosmos 472 (DS-P1-Yu)	Low Earth		Radar calibration
25 March 1972; 10:40	Kosmos-2		Plesetsk Site 133/1	Successful
25 March 1972; 10:40	Kosmos 481 (DS-P1-Yu)	Low Earth		Radar calibration
11 April 1972; 11:05	Kosmos-2		Plesetsk Site 133/1	Successful
11 April 1972; 11:05	Kosmos 485 (DS-P1-Yu)	Low Earth		Radar calibration
21 April 1972; 12:00	Kosmos-2		Plesetsk Site 133/1	Successful
21 April 1972; 12:00	Kosmos 487 (DS-P1-Yu)	Low Earth		Radar calibration
25 April 1972; 11:30	Kosmos-2		Plesetsk Site 133/1	Failure
25 April 1972; 11:30	DS-P1-Yu	Low Earth (planned)		Radar calibration
30 June 1972; 05:58	Kosmos-2		Kapustin Yar Site 86/4	Successful
30 June 1972; 05:58	Interkosmos 7 (DS-U3-IK)	Low Earth		Solar astronomy
30 June 1972; 09:19	Kosmos-2		Plesetsk Site 133/1	Successful
30 June 1972; 09:19	Kosmos 497 (DS-P1-I)	Low Earth		Radar calibration
5 July 1972; 09:30	Kosmos-2		Plesetsk Site 133/1	Successful
5 July 1972; 09:30	Kosmos 498 (DS-P1-Yu)	Low Earth		Radar calibration
12 July 1972; 06:00	Kosmos-2		Kapustin Yar Site 86/4	Successful
12 July 1972; 06:00	Kosmos 501 (DS-P1-Yu)	Low Earth		Radar calibration
5 October 1972; 11:30	Kosmos-2		Plesetsk Site 133/1	Successful
5 October 1972; 11:30	Kosmos 523 (DS-P1-Yu)	Low Earth		Radar calibration
11 October 1972; 13:20	Kosmos-2		Plesetsk Site 133/1	Successful
11 October 1972; 13:20	Kosmos 524 (DS-P1-Yu)	Low Earth		Radar calibration
25 October 1972; 10:40	Kosmos-2		Plesetsk Site 133/1	Successful
25 October 1972; 10:40	Kosmos 526 (DS-P1-Yu)	Low Earth		Radar calibration
30 November 1972; 21:50	Kosmos-2		Plesetsk Site 133/1	Successful
30 November 1972; 21:50	Interkosmos 8 (DS-U1-IK)	Low Earth		Ionosphere research
=== 1973 ===
24 January 1973; 11:44	Kosmos-2		Plesetsk Site 133/1	Successful
24 January 1973; 11:44	Kosmos 545 (DS-P1-Yu)	Low Earth		Radar calibration
12 April 1973; 11:49	Kosmos-2		Plesetsk Site 133/1	Successful
12 April 1973; 11:49	Kosmos 553 (DS-P1-Yu)	Low Earth		Radar calibration
19 April 1973; 10:20	Kosmos-2		Kapustin Yar Site 86/4	Successful
19 April 1973; 10:20	Interkosmos 9 (DS-U2-IK)	Low Earth		Ionosphere research
17 May 1973; 13:20	Kosmos-2		Plesetsk Site 133/1	Successful
17 May 1973; 13:20	Kosmos 558 (DS-P1-Yu)	Low Earth		Radar calibration
5 June 1973; 11:29	Kosmos-2		Plesetsk Site 133/1	Successful
5 June 1973; 11:29	Kosmos 562 (DS-P1-Yu)	Low Earth		Radar calibration
22 August 1973; 11:24	Kosmos-2		Plesetsk Site 133/1	Successful
22 August 1973; 11:24	Kosmos 580 (DS-P1-Yu)	Low Earth		Radar calibration
16 October 1973; 14:00	Kosmos-2		Plesetsk Site 133/1	Successful
16 October 1973; 14:00	Kosmos 601 (DS-P1-Yu)	Low Earth		Radar calibration
20 November 1973; 12:30	Kosmos-2		Plesetsk Site 133/1	Successful
20 November 1973; 12:30	Kosmos 608 (DS-P1-Yu)	Low Earth		Radar calibration
28 November 1973; 09:30	Kosmos-2		Plesetsk Site 133/1	Successful
28 November 1973; 09:30	Kosmos 611 (DS-P1-Yu)	Low Earth		Radar calibration
13 December 1973; 11:10	Kosmos-2		Plesetsk Site 133/1	Successful
13 December 1973; 11:10	Kosmos 615 (DS-P1-I)	Low Earth		Radar calibration
=== 1974 ===
27 February 1974; 11:05	Kosmos-2		Plesetsk Site 133/1	Successful
27 February 1974; 11:05	Kosmos 633 (DS-P1-Yu)	Low Earth		Radar calibration
5 March 1974; 16:04	Kosmos-2		Plesetsk Site 133/1	Successful
5 March 1974; 16:04	Kosmos 634 (DS-P1-Yu)	Low Earth		Radar calibration
26 June 1974; 12:30	Kosmos-2		Plesetsk Site 133/1	Successful
26 June 1974; 12:30	Kosmos 662 (DS-P1-I)	Low Earth		Radar calibration
11 July 1974; 11:00	Kosmos-2		Plesetsk Site 133/1	Failure
11 July 1974; 11:00	DS-P1-Yu	Low Earth (planned)		Radar calibration
25 July 1974; 12:06	Kosmos-2		Plesetsk Site 133/1	Successful
25 July 1974; 12:06	Kosmos 668 (DS-P1-Yu)	Low Earth		Radar calibration
26 September 1974; 16:34	Kosmos-2		Plesetsk Site 133/1	Successful
26 September 1974; 16:34	Kosmos 686 (DS-P1-Yu)	Low Earth		Radar calibration
20 November 1974; 12:00	Kosmos-2		Plesetsk Site 133/1	Successful
20 November 1974; 12:00	Kosmos 695 (DS-P1-Yu)	Low Earth		Radar calibration
=== 1975 ===
21 January 1975; 11:05	Kosmos-2		Plesetsk Site 133/1	Successful
21 January 1975; 11:05	Kosmos 703 (DS-P1-Yu)	Low Earth		Radar calibration
28 January 1975; 12:05	Kosmos-2		Plesetsk Site 133/1	Successful
28 January 1975; 12:05	Kosmos 705 (DS-P1-Yu)	Low Earth		Radar calibration
8 April 1975; 18:29	Kosmos-2		Plesetsk Site 133/1	Successful
8 April 1975; 18:29	Kosmos 725 (DS-P1-Yu)	Low Earth		Radar calibration
24 June 1975; 12:05	Kosmos-2		Plesetsk Site 133/1	Successful
24 June 1975; 12:05	Kosmos 745 (DS-P1-Yu)	Low Earth		Radar calibration
17 July 1975; 09:10	Kosmos-2		Plesetsk Site 133/1	Successful
17 July 1975; 09:10	Kosmos 750 (DS-P1-I)	Low Earth		Radar calibration
=== 1976 ===
5 February 1976; 14:30	Kosmos-2		Plesetsk Site 133/1	Successful
5 February 1976; 14:30	Kosmos 801 (DS-P1-I)	Low Earth		Radar calibration
18 May 1976; 11:00	Kosmos-2		Plesetsk Site 133/1	Successful
18 May 1976; 11:00	Kosmos 818 (DS-P1-Yu)	Low Earth		Radar calibration
18 August 1976; 09:30	Kosmos-2		Plesetsk Site 133/1	Successful
18 August 1976; 09:30	Kosmos 849 (DS-P1-I)	Low Earth		Radar calibration
26 August 1976; 11:00	Kosmos-2		Plesetsk Site 133/1	Successful
26 August 1976; 11:00	Kosmos 850 (DS-P1-Yu)	Low Earth		Radar calibration
=== 1977 ===
5 April 1977; 10:30	Kosmos-2		Plesetsk Site 133/1	Successful
5 April 1977; 10:30	Kosmos 901 (DS-P1-I)	Low Earth		Radar calibration
18 June 1977; 10:30	Kosmos-2		Plesetsk Site 133/1	Successful
18 June 1977; 10:30	Kosmos 919 (DS-P1-I)	Low Earth		Radar calibration

== R-14-based version launches history ==
Date/time (UTC)	Configuration	Serial number	Launch site	Outcome
Date/time (UTC)	Payload	Separation orbit	Operator	Function
Date/time (UTC)	Remarks			
=== 1964 ===
18 August 1964; 09:15	Kosmos-1		Baikonur Site 41/15	Successful
18 August 1964; 09:15	Kosmos 38/39/40 (Strela-1)	Low Earth		Communication
23 October 1964; 07:30	Kosmos-1		Baikonur Site 41/15	Failure
23 October 1964; 07:30	Strela-1 x 3	Low Earth (planned)		Communication
23 October 1964; 07:30	2nd stage engine failure due to fuel pipe breach			
=== 1965 ===
21 February 1965; 11:00	Kosmos-1		Baikonur Site 41/15	Successful
21 February 1965; 11:00	Kosmos 54/55/56 (Strela-1)	Low Earth		Communication
15 March 1965; 11:00	Kosmos-1		Baikonur Site 41/15	Successful
15 March 1965; 11:00	Kosmos 61/62/63 (Strela-1)	Low Earth		Communication
16 July 1965; 03:31	Kosmos-1		Baikonur Site 41/15	Successful
16 July 1965; 03:31	Kosmos 71/72/73/74/75 (Strela-1)	Low Earth		Communication
3 September 1965; 14:00	Kosmos-1		Baikonur Site 41/15	Successful
3 September 1965; 14:00	Kosmos 80/81/82/83/84 (Strela-1)	Low Earth		Communication
18 September 1965; 07:59	Kosmos-1		Baikonur Site 41/15	Successful
18 September 1965; 07:59	Kosmos 86/87/88/89/90 (Strela-1)	Low Earth		Communication
28 December 1965; 12:30	Kosmos-1		Baikonur Site 41/15	Successful
28 December 1965; 12:30	Kosmos 103 (Strela-2)	Low Earth		Communication
=== 1966 ===
16 November 1966; 13:00	Kosmos-3		Baikonur Site 41/15	Failure
16 November 1966; 13:00	Strela-2	Low Earth (planned)		Communication
16 November 1966; 13:00	2nd stage engine failure			
=== 1967 ===
24 March 1967; 11:50	Kosmos-3		Baikonur Site 41/15	Successful
24 March 1967; 11:50	Kosmos 151 (Strela-2)	Low Earth		Communication
15 May 1967; 11:00	Kosmos-3M		Plesetsk Site 132/2	Successful
15 May 1967; 11:00	Kosmos 158 (Tsiklon mass model)	Low Earth		Test flight
26 June 1967; 04:30	Kosmos-3M		Plesetsk Site 132/2	Failure
26 June 1967; 04:30	Tselina-O mass model	Low Earth (planned)		Test flight
26 June 1967; 04:30	Payload section exploded during 1st stage flight			
27 September 1967; 11:00	Kosmos-3M		Plesetsk Site 132/2	Failure
27 September 1967; 11:00	Tsiklon mass model	Low Earth (planned)		Test flight
27 September 1967; 11:00	1st stage engine failure			
30 October 1967; 18:00	Kosmos-3M		Plesetsk Site 132/2	Successful
30 October 1967; 18:00	Kosmos 189 (Tselina-O)	Low Earth		ELINT
23 November 1967; 15:00	Kosmos-3M		Plesetsk Site 132/2	Successful
23 November 1967; 15:00	Kosmos 192 (Tsiklon)	Low Earth		Navigation
=== 1968 ===
19 January 1968; 22:00	Kosmos-3M		Plesetsk Site 132/2	Successful
19 January 1968; 22:00	Kosmos 200 (Tselina-O)	Low Earth		ELINT
20 February 1968; 16:00	Kosmos-3M		Plesetsk Site 132/2	Successful
20 February 1968; 16:00	Kosmos 203 (Sfera)	Low Earth		Geodesy
7 May 1968; 13:58	Kosmos-3M		Plesetsk Site 132/2	Successful
7 May 1968; 13:58	Kosmos 220 (Tsiklon)	Low Earth		Navigation
4 June 1968; 18:45	Kosmos-3M		Plesetsk Site 132/2	Failure
4 June 1968; 18:45	Sfera	Low Earth (planned)		Geodesy
15 June 1968; 12:25	Kosmos-3		Baikonur Site 41/15	Failure
15 June 1968; 12:25	Strela-2	Low Earth (planned)		Communication
15 June 1968; 12:25	2nd stage control failure			
27 August 1968; 11:29	Kosmos-3		Baikonur Site 41/15	Successful
27 August 1968; 11:29	Kosmos 236 (Strela-2)	Low Earth		Communication
30 October 1968; 22:00	Kosmos-3M		Plesetsk Site 132/2	Successful
30 October 1968; 22:00	Kosmos 250 (Tselina-O)	Low Earth		ELINT
30 November 1968; 12:00	Kosmos-3M		Plesetsk Site 132/2	Successful
30 November 1968; 12:00	Kosmos 256 (Sfera)	Low Earth		Geodesy
=== 1969 ===
5 March 1969; 17:25	Kosmos-3M		Plesetsk Site 132/2	Successful
5 March 1969; 17:25	Kosmos 269 (Tselina-O)	Low Earth		ELINT
17 March 1969; 16:40	Kosmos-3M		Plesetsk Site 132/2	Successful
17 March 1969; 16:40	Kosmos 272 (Sfera)	Low Earth		Geodesy
13 August 1969; 22:00	Kosmos-3M		Plesetsk Site 132/2	Successful
13 August 1969; 22:00	Kosmos 292 (Tsiklon)	Low Earth		Navigation
21 October 1969; 12:50	Kosmos-3M		Plesetsk Site 132/1	Successful
21 October 1969; 12:50	Kosmos 304 (Tsiklon)	Low Earth		Navigation
24 November 1969; 16:50	Kosmos-3M		Plesetsk Site 132/1	Successful
24 November 1969; 16:50	Kosmos 312 (Sfera)	Low Earth		Geodesy
20 December 1969; 03:26	Kosmos-3M		Plesetsk Site 132/1	Successful
20 December 1969; 03:26	Kosmos 315 (Tselina-O)	Low Earth		ELINT
27 December 1969; 14:20	Kosmos-3M		Plesetsk Site 132/1	Failure
27 December 1969; 14:20	Ionosfernaya	Low Earth (planned)		Ionosphere research
=== 1970 ===
7 April 1970; 11:10	Kosmos-3M		Plesetsk Site 132/2	Successful
7 April 1970; 11:10	Kosmos 330 (Tselina-O)	Low Earth		ELINT
11 April 1970; 17:00	Kosmos-3M		Plesetsk Site 132/2	Successful
11 April 1970; 17:00	Kosmos 332 (Tsiklon)	Low Earth		Navigation
25 April 1970; 17:09	Kosmos-3M		Plesetsk Site 132/2	Successful
25 April 1970; 17:09	Kosmos 336/337/338/339/340/341/342/343 (Strela-1M)	Low Earth		Communication
27 June 1970; 16:40	Kosmos-3M		Plesetsk Site 132/1	Failure
27 June 1970; 16:40	Strela-2M	Low Earth (planned)		Communication
20 August 1970; 14:30	Kosmos-3M		Plesetsk Site 132/1	Successful
20 August 1970; 14:30	Kosmos 358 (DS-P1-M)	Low Earth		Anti-satellite weapon test target
12 October 1970; 13:57	Kosmos-3M		Plesetsk Site 132/1	Successful
12 October 1970; 13:57	Kosmos 371 (Tsiklon)	Low Earth		Navigation
16 October 1970; 15:00	Kosmos-3M		Plesetsk Site 132/1	Successful
16 October 1970; 15:00	Kosmos 372 (Strela-2M)	Low Earth		Communication
17 November 1970; 18:20	Kosmos-3M		Plesetsk Site 132/2	Successful
17 November 1970; 18:20	Kosmos 378 (DS-U2-IP)	Low Earth		Ionosphere research
2 December 1970; 04:00	Kosmos-3M		Plesetsk Site 132/2	Successful
2 December 1970; 04:00	Kosmos 381 (Ionosfernaya)	Low Earth		Ionosphere research
12 December 1970; 13:00	Kosmos-3M		Plesetsk Site 132/2	Successful
12 December 1970; 13:00	Kosmos 385 (Tsiklon)	Low Earth		Navigation
16 December 1970; 04:30	Kosmos-3M		Plesetsk Site 132/2	Successful
16 December 1970; 04:30	Kosmos 387 (Tselina-O)	Low Earth		ELINT
22 December 1970; 21:30	Kosmos-3M		Plesetsk Site 132/2	Failure
22 December 1970; 21:30	DS-P1-M	Low Earth (planned)		Anti-satellite weapon test target
22 December 1970; 21:30	First stage engine failure			
=== 1971 ===
9 February 1971; 18:48	Kosmos-3M		Plesetsk Site 132/1	Successful
9 February 1971; 18:48	Kosmos 394 (DS-P1-M)	Low Earth		Anti-satellite weapon test target
17 February 1971; 21:10	Kosmos-3M		Plesetsk Site 132/1	Successful
17 February 1971; 21:10	Kosmos 395 (Tselina-O)	Low Earth		ELINT
18 March 1971; 21:45	Kosmos-3M		Plesetsk Site 132/1	Successful
18 March 1971; 21:45	Kosmos 400 (DS-P1-M)	Low Earth		Anti-satellite weapon test target
23 April 1971; 11:30	Kosmos-3M		Plesetsk Site 132/1	Successful
23 April 1971; 11:30	Kosmos 407 (Strela-2M)	Low Earth		Communication
28 April 1971; 14:35	Kosmos-3M		Plesetsk Site 132/1	Successful
28 April 1971; 14:35	Kosmos 409 (Sfera)	Low Earth		Geodesy
7 May 1971; 14:20	Kosmos-3M		Plesetsk Site 132/1	Successful
7 May 1971; 14:20	Kosmos 411/412/413/414/415/416/417/418 (Strela-1M)	Low Earth		Communication
22 May 1971; 00:51	Kosmos-3M		Plesetsk Site 132/1	Successful
22 May 1971; 00:51	Kosmos 422 (Tsiklon)	Low Earth		Navigation
29 May 1971; 03:50	Kosmos-3M		Plesetsk Site 132/1	Successful
29 May 1971; 03:50	Kosmos 425 (Tselina-O)	Low Earth		ELINT
4 June 1971; 18:10	Kosmos-3M		Plesetsk Site 132/2	Successful
4 June 1971; 18:10	Kosmos 426 (DS-U2-K)	Low Earth		Magnetosphere research
22 July 1971; 13:45	Kosmos-3M		Plesetsk Site 132/2	Failure
22 July 1971; 13:45	Tselina-O	Low Earth (planned)		ELINT
7 September 1971; 01:15	Kosmos-3M		Plesetsk Site 132/2	Successful
7 September 1971; 01:15	Kosmos 436 (Tselina-O)	Low Earth		ELINT
10 September 1971; 03:38	Kosmos-3M		Plesetsk Site 132/2	Successful
10 September 1971; 03:38	Kosmos 437 (Tselina-O)	Low Earth		ELINT
13 October 1971; 13:41	Kosmos-3M		Plesetsk Site 132/2	Successful
13 October 1971; 13:41	Kosmos 444/445/446/447/448/449/450/451 (Strela-1M)	Low Earth		Communication
20 November 1971; 18:00	Kosmos-3M		Plesetsk Site 132/2	Successful
20 November 1971; 18:00	Kosmos 457 (Sfera)	Low Earth		Geodesy
29 November 1971; 17:30	Kosmos-3M		Plesetsk Site 132/1	Successful
29 November 1971; 17:30	Kosmos 459 (DS-P1-M)	Low Earth		Anti-satellite weapon test target
30 November 1971; 16:39	Kosmos-3M		Plesetsk Site 132/2	Successful
30 November 1971; 16:39	Kosmos 460 (Tselina-O)	Low Earth		ELINT
2 December 1971; 17:30	Kosmos-3M		Plesetsk Site 132/1	Successful
2 December 1971; 17:30	Kosmos 461 (DS-U2-MT)	Low Earth		High-energy astronomy research
15 December 1971; 04:31	Kosmos-3M		Plesetsk Site 132/2	Successful
15 December 1971; 04:31	Kosmos 465 (Tsiklon)	Low Earth		Navigation
17 December 1971; 13:00	Kosmos-3M		Plesetsk Site 132/2	Successful
17 December 1971; 13:00	Kosmos 468 (Strela-2M)	Low Earth		Communication
27 December 1971; 19:00	Kosmos-3M		Plesetsk Site 132/2	Successful
27 December 1971; 19:00	Aureole 1 (DS-U2-GKA)	Low Earth	CNES	Magnetosphere research
=== 1972 ===
25 February 1972; 07:52	Kosmos-3M		Plesetsk Site 132/2	Successful
25 February 1972; 07:52	Kosmos 475 (Tsiklon)	Low Earth		Navigation
22 March 1972; 20:31	Kosmos-3M		Plesetsk Site 132/2	Successful
22 March 1972; 20:31	Kosmos 479 (Tselina-O)	Low Earth		ELINT
25 March 1972; 02:20	Kosmos-3M		Plesetsk Site 132/2	Successful
25 March 1972; 02:20	Kosmos 480 (Sfera)	Low Earth		Geodesy
6 May 1972; 11:24	Kosmos-3M		Plesetsk Site 132/1	Successful
6 May 1972; 11:24	Kosmos 489 (Tsiklon)	Low Earth		Navigation
23 June 1972; 09:24	Kosmos-3M		Plesetsk Site 132/2	Successful
23 June 1972; 09:24	Kosmos 494 (Strela-2M)	Low Earth		Communication
10 July 1972; 16:15	Kosmos-3M		Plesetsk Site 132/2	Successful
10 July 1972; 16:15	Kosmos 500 (Tselina-O)	Low Earth		ELINT
20 July 1972; 18:10	Kosmos-3M		Plesetsk Site 132/2	Successful
20 July 1972; 18:10	Kosmos 504/505/506/507/508/509/510/511 (Strela-1M)	Low Earth		Communication
16 August 1972; 13:40	Kosmos-3M		Plesetsk Site 132/2	Successful
16 August 1972; 13:40	Kosmos 514 (Tsiklon)	Low Earth		Navigation
29 September 1972; 20:19	Kosmos-3M		Plesetsk Site 132/2	Successful
29 September 1972; 20:19	Kosmos 521 (DS-P1-M)	Low Earth		Anti-satellite weapon test target
17 October 1972; 19:59	Kosmos-3M		Plesetsk Site 132/1	Failure
17 October 1972; 19:59	Strela-2M	Low Earth (planned)		Communication
1 November 1972; 02:08	Kosmos-3M		Plesetsk Site 132/2	Successful
1 November 1972; 02:08	Kosmos 528/529/530/531/532/533/534/535 (Strela-1M)	Low Earth		Communication
3 November 1972; 01:34	Kosmos-3M		Plesetsk Site 132/1	Successful
3 November 1972; 01:34	Kosmos 536 (Tselina-O)	Low Earth		ELINT
21 December 1972; 02:05	Kosmos-3M		Plesetsk Site 132/2	Successful
21 December 1972; 02:05	Kosmos 539 (Sfera)	Low Earth		Geodesy
25 December 1972; 23:05	Kosmos-3M		Plesetsk Site 132/2	Successful
25 December 1972; 23:05	Kosmos 540 (Strela-2M)	Low Earth		Communication
=== 1973 ===
20 January 1973; 03:36	Kosmos-3M		Plesetsk Site 132/1	Successful
20 January 1973; 03:36	Kosmos 544 (Tselina-O)	Low Earth		ELINT
26 January 1973; 11:44	Kosmos-3M		Kapustin Yar Site 107/1	Successful
26 January 1973; 11:44	Kosmos 546 (Tsiklon)	Low Earth		Navigation
28 February 1973; 04:37	Kosmos-3M		Plesetsk Site 132/1	Successful
28 February 1973; 04:37	Kosmos 549 (Tselina-O)	Low Earth		ELINT
25 May 1973; 09:15	Kosmos-3M		Plesetsk Site 132/1	Failure
25 May 1973; 09:15	Tsiklon	Low Earth (planned)		Navigation
25 May 1973; 09:15	First stage flight guidance failure			
8 June 1973; 15:50	Kosmos-3M		Plesetsk Site 132/1	Successful
8 June 1973; 15:50	Kosmos 564/565/566/567/568/569/570/571 (Strela-1M)	Low Earth		Communication
20 June 1973; 06:16	Kosmos-3M		Plesetsk Site 132/1	Successful
20 June 1973; 06:16	Kosmos 574 (Tsiklon)	Low Earth		Navigation
26 June 1973; 01:22	Kosmos-3M		Plesetsk Site 132/1	Failure
26 June 1973; 01:22	Tselina-O	Low Earth (planned)		ELINT
26 June 1973; 01:22	Vehicle exploded on pad during servicing, killing 9 people.			
28 August 1973; 10:08	Kosmos-3M		Plesetsk Site 132/2	Successful
28 August 1973; 10:08	Kosmos 582 (Tselina-O)	Low Earth		ELINT
8 September 1973; 01:50	Kosmos-3M		Plesetsk Site 132/2	Successful
8 September 1973; 01:50	Kosmos 585 (Sfera)	Low Earth		Geodesy
14 September 1973; 00:31	Kosmos-3M		Plesetsk Site 132/2	Successful
14 September 1973; 00:31	Kosmos 586 (Tsiklon)	Low Earth		Navigation
2 October 1973; 21:46	Kosmos-3M		Plesetsk Site 132/2	Successful
2 October 1973; 21:46	Kosmos 588/589/590/591/592/593/594/595 (Strela-1M)	Low Earth		Communication
30 October 1973; 19:00	Kosmos-3M		Plesetsk Site 132/2	Successful
30 October 1973; 19:00	Interkosmos 10 (DS-U2-IK)	Low Earth		Ionosphere research
27 November 1973; 00:08	Kosmos-3M		Plesetsk Site 132/2	Successful
27 November 1973; 00:08	Kosmos 610 (Tselina-O)	Low Earth		ELINT
4 December 1973; 15:00	Kosmos-3M		Plesetsk Site 132/2	Successful
4 December 1973; 15:00	Kosmos 614 (Strela-2M)	Low Earth		Communication
19 December 1973; 09:43	Kosmos-3M		Plesetsk Site 132/2	Successful
19 December 1973; 09:43	Kosmos 617/618/619/620/621/622/623/624 (Strela-1M)	Low Earth		Communication
26 December 1973; 16:30	Kosmos-3M		Plesetsk Site 132/2	Successful
26 December 1973; 16:30	Aureole 2 (DS-U2-GKA)	Low Earth	CNES	Magnetosphere research
29 December 1973; 04:12	Kosmos-3M		Plesetsk Site 132/2	Successful
29 December 1973; 04:12	Kosmos 627 (Tsiklon)	Low Earth		Navigation
=== 1974 ===
17 January 1974; 10:07	Kosmos-3M		Plesetsk Site 132/2	Successful
17 January 1974; 10:07	Kosmos 628 (Tsiklon)	Low Earth		Navigation
6 February 1974; 00:34	Kosmos-3M		Plesetsk Site 132/2	Successful
6 February 1974; 00:34	Kosmos 631 (Tselina-O)	Low Earth		ELINT
23 April 1974; 14:15	Kosmos-3M		Plesetsk Site 132/2	Successful
23 April 1974; 14:15	Kosmos 641/642/643/644/645/646/647/648 (Strela-1M)	Low Earth		Communication
29 April 1974; 17:10	Kosmos-3M		Plesetsk Site 132/2	Successful
29 April 1974; 17:10	Kosmos 650 (Sfera)	Low Earth		Geodesy
17 May 1974; 11:00	Kosmos-3M		Kapustin Yar Site 107/1	Successful
17 May 1974; 11:00	Interkosmos 11 (DS-U3-IK)	Low Earth		Solar astronomy research
21 May 1974; 06:16	Kosmos-3M		Plesetsk Site 132/2	Successful
21 May 1974; 06:16	Kosmos 655 (Tselina-O)	Low Earth		ELINT
18 June 1974; 13:00	Kosmos-3M		Plesetsk Site 132/2	Successful
18 June 1974; 13:00	Kosmos 660 (Taifun-1)	Low Earth		Radar calibration
21 June 1974; 09:03	Kosmos-3M		Plesetsk Site 132/2	Successful
21 June 1974; 09:03	Kosmos 661 (Tselina-O)	Low Earth		ELINT
27 June 1974; 15:39	Kosmos-3M		Plesetsk Site 132/1	Successful
27 June 1974; 15:39	Kosmos 663 (Tsiklon)	Low Earth		Navigation
29 August 1974; 14:55	Kosmos-3M		Plesetsk Site 132/2	Successful
29 August 1974; 14:55	Kosmos 675 (Sfera)	Low Earth		Geodesy
11 September 1974; 17:40	Kosmos-3M		Plesetsk Site 132/2	Successful
11 September 1974; 17:40	Kosmos 676 (Strela-2M)	Low Earth		Communication
19 September 1974; 14:57	Kosmos-3M		Plesetsk Site 132/2	Successful
19 September 1974; 14:57	Kosmos 677/678/679/680/681/682/683/684 (Strela-1M)	Low Earth		Communication
11 October 1974; 11:30	Kosmos-3M		Plesetsk Site 132/2	Successful
11 October 1974; 11:30	Kosmos 687 (Taifun-1)	Low Earth		Radar calibration
18 October 1974; 22:36	Kosmos-3M		Plesetsk Site 132/1	Successful
18 October 1974; 22:36	Kosmos 689 (Tsiklon)	Low Earth		Navigation
31 October 1974; 10:00	Kosmos-3M		Plesetsk Site 132/2	Successful
31 October 1974; 10:00	Interkosmos 12 (DS-U2-IK)	Low Earth		Ionosphere research
18 December 1974; 14:12	Kosmos-3M		Plesetsk Site 132/1	Successful
18 December 1974; 14:12	Kosmos 698 (Tselina-O)	Low Earth		ELINT
26 December 1974; 12:00	Kosmos-3M		Plesetsk Site 132/1	Successful
26 December 1974; 12:00	Kosmos 700 (Parus)	Low Earth		Navigation/Communication
=== 1975 ===
5 February 1975; 13:15	Kosmos-3M		Plesetsk Site 132/1	Successful
5 February 1975; 13:15	Kosmos 707 (Tselina-O)	Low Earth		ELINT
12 February 1975; 03:30	Kosmos-3M		Plesetsk Site 132/1	Successful
12 February 1975; 03:30	Kosmos 708 (Sfera)	Low Earth		Geodesy
28 February 1975; 14:02	Kosmos-3M		Plesetsk Site 132/2	Successful
28 February 1975; 14:02	Kosmos 711/712/713/714/715/716/717/718 (Strela-1M)	Low Earth		Communication
27 March 1975; 14:30	Kosmos-3M		Plesetsk Site 132/1	Successful
27 March 1975; 14:30	Interkosmos 13 (DS-U2-IK)	Low Earth		Ionosphere research
11 April 1975; 07:57	Kosmos-3M		Plesetsk Site 132/1	Successful
11 April 1975; 07:57	Kosmos 726 (Parus)	Low Earth		Navigation/Communication
19 April 1975; 07:58	Kosmos-3M		Kapustin Yar Site 107/2	Successful
19 April 1975; 07:58	Aryabhata	Low Earth	ISRO	Technology
19 April 1975; 07:58	First Indian satellite			
22 April 1975; 21:10	Kosmos-3M		Plesetsk Site 132/1	Successful
22 April 1975; 21:10	Kosmos 729 (Tsiklon)	Low Earth		Navigation
28 May 1975; 00:25	Kosmos-3M		Plesetsk Site 132/1	Successful
28 May 1975; 00:25	Kosmos 732/733/734/735/736/737/738/739 (Strela-1M)	Low Earth		Communication
3 June 1975; 09:00	Kosmos-3M		Kapustin Yar Site 107/2	Failure
3 June 1975; 09:00	DS-U3-IK	Low Earth (planned)		Solar astronomy research
3 June 1975; 09:00	First stage engine failure			
4 July 1975; 00:56	Kosmos-3M		Plesetsk Site 132/1	Successful
4 July 1975; 00:56	Kosmos 749 (Tselina-O)	Low Earth		ELINT
24 July 1975; 19:00	Kosmos-3M		Plesetsk Site 132/1	Successful
24 July 1975; 19:00	Kosmos 752 (Taifun-1)	Low Earth		Radar calibration
14 August 1975; 13:29	Kosmos-3M		Plesetsk Site 132/1	Successful
14 August 1975; 13:29	Kosmos 755 (Parus)	Low Earth		Navigation/Communication
17 September 1975; 07:10	Kosmos-3M		Plesetsk Site 132/1	Successful
17 September 1975; 07:10	Kosmos 761/762/763/764/765/766/767/768 (Strela-1M)	Low Earth		Communication
24 September 1975; 12:00	Kosmos-3M		Plesetsk Site 132/1	Successful
24 September 1975; 12:00	Kosmos 770 (Sfera)	Low Earth		Geodesy
30 September 1975; 18:38	Kosmos-3M		Plesetsk Site 132/1	Successful
30 September 1975; 18:38	Kosmos 773 (Strela-2M)	Low Earth		Communication
4 November 1975; 10:12	Kosmos-3M		Plesetsk Site 132/1	Successful
4 November 1975; 10:12	Kosmos 778 (Parus)	Low Earth		Navigation/Communication
21 November 1975; 17:11	Kosmos-3M		Plesetsk Site 132/1	Successful
21 November 1975; 17:11	Kosmos 781 (Tselina-O)	Low Earth		ELINT
28 November 1975; 00:10	Kosmos-3M		Plesetsk Site 132/1	Successful
28 November 1975; 00:10	Kosmos 783 (Strela-2M)	Low Earth		Communication
11 December 1975; 17:00	Kosmos-3M		Plesetsk Site 132/1	Successful
11 December 1975; 17:00	Interkosmos 14 (DS-U2-IK)	Low Earth		Ionosphere research
19 December 1975; 14:00	Kosmos-3M		Plesetsk Site 132/1	Failure
19 December 1975; 14:00	DS-P1-M	Low Earth (planned)		Anti-satellite weapon test target
19 December 1975; 14:00	Second stage engine failure			
=== 1976 ===
6 January 1976; 04:52	Kosmos-3M		Plesetsk Site 132/1	Successful
6 January 1976; 04:52	Kosmos 787 (Tselina-O)	Low Earth		ELINT
20 January 1976; 17:07	Kosmos-3M		Plesetsk Site 132/1	Successful
20 January 1976; 17:07	Kosmos 789 (Parus)	Low Earth		Navigation/Communication
22 January 1976; 22:26	Kosmos-3M		Plesetsk Site 132/1	Successful
22 January 1976; 22:26	Kosmos 790 (Tselina-O)	Low Earth		ELINT
28 January 1976; 10:39	Kosmos-3M		Plesetsk Site 132/1	Successful
28 January 1976; 10:39	Kosmos 791/792/793/794/795/796/797/798 (Strela-1M)	Low Earth		Communication
3 February 1976; 08:16	Kosmos-3M		Plesetsk Site 132/1	Successful
3 February 1976; 08:16	Kosmos 800 (Tsiklon)	Low Earth		Navigation
12 February 1976; 13:00	Kosmos-3M		Plesetsk Site 132/2	Successful
12 February 1976; 13:00	Kosmos 803 (DS-P1-M)	Low Earth		Anti-satellite weapon test target
12 March 1976; 13:30	Kosmos-3M		Plesetsk Site 132/1	Successful
12 March 1976; 13:30	Kosmos 807 (Taifun-1)	Low Earth		Radar calibration
6 April 1976; 04:14	Kosmos-3M		Plesetsk Site 132/1	Successful
6 April 1976; 04:14	Kosmos 812 (Tselina-O)	Low Earth		ELINT
28 April 1976; 13:30	Kosmos-3M		Plesetsk Site 132/1	Successful
28 April 1976; 13:30	Kosmos 816 (Taifun-2)	Low Earth		Radar calibration
28 May 1976; 15:00	Kosmos-3M		Plesetsk Site 132/1	Successful
28 May 1976; 15:00	Kosmos 822 (Taifun-1)	Low Earth		Radar calibration
2 June 1976; 22:30	Kosmos-3M		Plesetsk Site 132/2	Successful
2 June 1976; 22:30	Kosmos 823 (Tsiklon)	Low Earth		Navigation
15 June 1976; 13:19	Kosmos-3M		Plesetsk Site 132/2	Successful
15 June 1976; 13:19	Kosmos 825/826/827/828/829/830/831/832 (Strela-1M)	Low Earth		Communication
19 June 1976; 16:00	Kosmos-3M		Plesetsk Site 132/1	Successful
19 June 1976; 16:00	Interkosmos 15	Low Earth		Technology
29 June 1976; 08:12	Kosmos-3M		Plesetsk Site 132/2	Successful
29 June 1976; 08:12	Kosmos 836 (Strela-2M)	Low Earth		Communication
8 July 1976; 21:08	Kosmos-3M		Plesetsk Site 132/1	Successful
8 July 1976; 21:08	Kosmos 839 (DS-P1-M)	Low Earth		Anti-satellite weapon test target
15 July 1976; 13:11	Kosmos-3M		Plesetsk Site 132/1	Successful
15 July 1976; 13:11	Kosmos 841 (Strela-2M)	Low Earth		Communication
21 July 1976; 10:20	Kosmos-3M		Plesetsk Site 132/1	Successful
21 July 1976; 10:20	Kosmos 842 (Sfera)	Low Earth		Geodesy
27 July 1976; 05:21	Kosmos-3M		Plesetsk Site 132/2	Successful
27 July 1976; 05:21	Kosmos 845 (Tselina-O)	Low Earth		ELINT
27 July 1976; 12:00	Kosmos-3M		Kapustin Yar Site 107/2	Successful
27 July 1976; 12:00	Interkosmos 16 (DS-U3-IK)	Low Earth		Solar astronomy research
29 July 1976; 20:02	Kosmos-3M		Plesetsk Site 132/1	Successful
29 July 1976; 20:02	Kosmos 846 (Tsiklon)	Low Earth		Navigation
29 September 1976; 07:04	Kosmos-3M		Plesetsk Site 132/2	Successful
29 September 1976; 07:04	Kosmos 858 (Strela-2M)	Low Earth		Communication
29 October 1976; 12:39	Kosmos-3M		Plesetsk Site 132/2	Successful
29 October 1976; 12:39	Kosmos 864 (Parus)	Low Earth		Navigation/Communication
2 December 1976; 00:17	Kosmos-3M		Plesetsk Site 132/2	Successful
2 December 1976; 00:17	Kosmos 870 (Tselina-O)	Low Earth		ELINT
7 December 1976; 10:23	Kosmos-3M		Plesetsk Site 132/1	Successful
7 December 1976; 10:23	Kosmos 871/872/873/874/875/876/877/878 (Strela-1M)	Low Earth		Communication
9 December 1976; 20:00	Kosmos-3M		Plesetsk Site 132/2	Successful
9 December 1976; 20:00	Kosmos 880 (DS-P1-M)	Low Earth		Anti-satellite weapon test target
15 December 1976; 14:00	Kosmos-3M		Plesetsk Site 132/1	Successful
15 December 1976; 14:00	Kosmos 883 (Tsikada)	Low Earth		Navigation/Communication
17 December 1976; 12:00	Kosmos-3M		Plesetsk Site 132/2	Successful
17 December 1976; 12:00	Kosmos 885 (Taifun-2)	Low Earth		Radar calibration
28 December 1976; 07:50	Kosmos-3M		Plesetsk Site 132/1	Successful
28 December 1976; 07:50	Kosmos 887 (Parus)	Low Earth		Navigation/Communication
=== 1977 ===
20 January 1977; 20:05	Kosmos-3M		Plesetsk Site 132/1	Successful
20 January 1977; 20:05	Kosmos 890 (Tsiklon)	Low Earth		Navigation
2 February 1977; 12:30	Kosmos-3M		Plesetsk Site 132/2	Successful
2 February 1977; 12:30	Kosmos 891 (Taifun-1)	Low Earth		Radar calibration
15 February 1977; 11:00	Kosmos-3M		Plesetsk Site 132/2	Successful
15 February 1977; 11:00	Kosmos 893 (DS-U2-IK mass model)	Low Earth		Test Flight
21 February 1977; 17:20	Kosmos-3M		Plesetsk Site 132/1	Successful
21 February 1977; 17:20	Kosmos 894 (Parus)	Low Earth		Navigation/Communication
24 March 1977; 22:11	Kosmos-3M		Plesetsk Site 132/2	Successful
24 March 1977; 22:11	Kosmos 899 (Tselina-O)	Low Earth		ELINT
29 March 1977; 23:00	Kosmos-3M		Plesetsk Site 132/2	Successful
29 March 1977; 23:00	Kosmos 900	Low Earth		Ionosphere research
27 April 1977; 03:30	Kosmos-3M		Kapustin Yar Site 107/1	Successful
27 April 1977; 03:30	Kosmos 906 (Signe 3 mass model)	Low Earth		Test Flight
19 May 1977; 16:30	Kosmos-3M		Plesetsk Site 132/2	Successful
19 May 1977; 16:30	Kosmos 909 (DS-P1-M)	Low Earth		Anti-satellite weapon test target
25 May 1977; 11:00	Kosmos-3M		Plesetsk Site 132/2	Successful
25 May 1977; 11:00	Kosmos 911 (Sfera)	Low Earth		Geodesy
30 May 1977; 22:30	Kosmos-3M		Plesetsk Site 132/1	Successful
30 May 1977; 22:30	Kosmos 913 (Taifun-2)	Low Earth		Radar calibration
17 June 1977; 03:30	Kosmos-3M		Kapustin Yar Site 107/1	Successful
17 June 1977; 03:30	Signe 3	Low Earth	CNES	Solar astronomy research
1 July 1977; 11:52	Kosmos-3M		Plesetsk Site 132/1	Successful
1 July 1977; 11:52	Kosmos 923 (Strela-2M)	Low Earth		Communication
4 July 1977; 22:20	Kosmos-3M		Plesetsk Site 132/2	Successful
4 July 1977; 22:20	Kosmos 924 (Tselina-O)	Low Earth		ELINT
8 July 1977; 17:30	Kosmos-3M		Plesetsk Site 132/1	Successful
8 July 1977; 17:30	Kosmos 926 (Tsikada)	Low Earth		Navigation/Communication
13 July 1977; 05:02	Kosmos-3M		Plesetsk Site 132/1	Successful
13 July 1977; 05:02	Kosmos 928 (Parus)	Low Earth		Navigation/Communication
19 July 1977; 08:40	Kosmos-3M		Plesetsk Site 132/2	Successful
19 July 1977; 08:40	Kosmos 930 (Taifun-1)	Low Earth		Radar calibration
22 July 1977; 10:00	Kosmos-3M		Plesetsk Site 132/1	Successful
22 July 1977; 10:00	Kosmos 933 (Taifun-1)	Low Earth		Radar calibration
24 August 1977; 18:20	Kosmos-3M		Plesetsk Site 132/1	Successful
24 August 1977; 18:20	Kosmos 939/940/941/942/943/944/945/946 (Strela-1M)	Low Earth		Communication
13 September 1977; 19:59	Kosmos-3M		Plesetsk Site 132/1	Successful
13 September 1977; 19:59	Kosmos 951 (Parus)	Low Earth		Navigation/Communication
24 September 1977; 16:30	Kosmos-3M		Plesetsk Site 132/1	Successful
24 September 1977; 16:30	Interkosmos 17	Low Earth		Technology
21 October 1977; 10:05	Kosmos-3M		Plesetsk Site 132/1	Successful
21 October 1977; 10:05	Kosmos 959 (DS-P1-M)	Low Earth		Anti-satellite weapon test target
25 October 1977; 05:25	Kosmos-3M		Plesetsk Site 132/1	Successful
25 October 1977; 05:25	Kosmos 960 (Tselina-O)	Low Earth		ELINT
28 October 1977; 16:00	Kosmos-3M		Plesetsk Site 132/1	Successful
28 October 1977; 16:00	Kosmos 962 (Tsiklon)	Low Earth		Navigation
24 November 1977; 14:30	Kosmos-3M		Plesetsk Site 132/1	Successful
24 November 1977; 14:30	Kosmos 963 (Sfera)	Low Earth		Geodesy
29 November 1977; 07:05	Kosmos-3M		Plesetsk Site 132/1	Failure
29 November 1977; 07:05	Tsikada	Low Earth (planned)		Navigation/Communication
29 November 1977; 07:05	Second stage engine failed to ignite due to pressurization system breatch			
8 December 1977; 11:00	Kosmos-3M		Plesetsk Site 132/2	Successful
8 December 1977; 11:00	Kosmos 965 (Taifun-2)	Low Earth		Radar calibration
13 December 1977; 15:53	Kosmos-3M		Plesetsk Site 132/1	Successful
13 December 1977; 15:53	Kosmos 967 (DS-P1-M)	Low Earth		Anti-satellite weapon test target
16 December 1977; 04:25	Kosmos-3M		Plesetsk Site 132/1	Successful
16 December 1977; 04:25	Kosmos 968 (Strela-2M)	Low Earth		Communication
23 December 1977; 16:24	Kosmos-3M		Plesetsk Site 132/1	Successful
23 December 1977; 16:24	Kosmos 971 (Parus)	Low Earth		Navigation/Communication
=== 1978 ===
10 January 1978; 20:51	Kosmos-3M		Plesetsk Site 132/2	Successful
10 January 1978; 20:51	Kosmos 976/977/978/979/980/981/982/983 (Strela-1M)	Low Earth		Communication
17 January 1978; 03:26	Kosmos-3M		Plesetsk Site 132/1	Successful
17 January 1978; 03:26	Kosmos 985 (Parus)	Low Earth		Navigation/Communication
17 February 1978; 16:33	Kosmos-3M		Plesetsk Site 132/2	Successful
17 February 1978; 16:33	Kosmos 990 (Strela-2M)	Low Earth		Communication
28 February 1978; 06:43	Kosmos-3M		Plesetsk Site 132/2	Successful
28 February 1978; 06:43	Kosmos 991 (Parus)	Low Earth		Navigation/Communication
15 March 1978; 15:57	Kosmos-3M		Plesetsk Site 132/2	Successful
15 March 1978; 15:57	Kosmos 994 (Tsiklon)	Low Earth		Navigation
28 March 1978; 01:30	Kosmos-3M		Plesetsk Site 132/1	Successful
28 March 1978; 01:30	Kosmos 996 (Parus)	Low Earth		Navigation/Communication
31 March 1978; 14:01	Kosmos-3M		Plesetsk Site 132/1	Successful
31 March 1978; 14:01	Kosmos 1000 (Tsikada)	Low Earth		Navigation/Communication
12 May 1978; 11:00	Kosmos-3M		Plesetsk Site 132/1	Successful
12 May 1978; 11:00	Kosmos 1006 (Taifun-2)	Low Earth		Radar calibration
17 May 1978; 14:39	Kosmos-3M		Plesetsk Site 132/1	Successful
17 May 1978; 14:39	Kosmos 1008 (Tselina-O)	Low Earth		ELINT
23 May 1978; 16:57	Kosmos-3M		Plesetsk Site 132/1	Successful
23 May 1978; 16:57	Kosmos 1011 (Parus)	Low Earth		Navigation/Communication
7 June 1978; 22:00	Kosmos-3M		Plesetsk Site 132/1	Successful
7 June 1978; 22:00	Kosmos 1013/1014/1015/1016/1017/1018/1019/1020 (Strela-1M)	Low Earth		Communication
21 June 1978; 09:27	Kosmos-3M		Plesetsk Site 132/1	Successful
21 June 1978; 09:27	Kosmos 1023 (Strela-2M)	Low Earth		Communication
27 July 1978; 04:49	Kosmos-3M		Plesetsk Site 132/2	Successful
27 July 1978; 04:49	Kosmos 1027 (Tsiklon)	Low Earth		Navigation
4 October 1978; 03:49	Kosmos-3M		Plesetsk Site 132/1	Successful
4 October 1978; 03:49	Kosmos 1034/1035/1036/1037/1038/1039/1040/1041 (Strela-1M)	Low Earth		Communication
24 October 1978; 19:00	Kosmos-3M		Plesetsk Site 132/1	Successful
24 October 1978; 19:00	Interkosmos 18/Magion 1	Low Earth		Magnetosphere research
16 November 1978; 21:45	Kosmos-3M		Plesetsk Site 132/2	Successful
16 November 1978; 21:45	Kosmos 1048 (Strela-2M)	Low Earth		Communication
5 December 1978; 18:12	Kosmos-3M		Plesetsk Site 132/2	Successful
5 December 1978; 18:12	Kosmos 1051/1052/1053/1054/1055/1056/1057/1058 (Strela-1M)	Low Earth		Communication
15 December 1978; 13:19	Kosmos-3M		Plesetsk Site 132/2	Successful
15 December 1978; 13:19	Kosmos 1062 (Tselina-O)	Low Earth		ELINT
20 December 1978; 20:43	Kosmos-3M		Plesetsk Site 132/1	Partial Failure
20 December 1978; 20:43	Kosmos 1064 (Parus)	Low Earth		Navigation/Communication
20 December 1978; 20:43	Second stage engine shut down during second burn due to valve leakage; spacecraft left in unusable orbit			
22 December 1978; 22:00	Kosmos-3M		Kapustin Yar Site 107/1	Successful
22 December 1978; 22:00	Kosmos 1065 (Taifun-2)	Low Earth		Radar calibration
26 December 1978; 13:30	Kosmos-3M		Plesetsk Site 132/2	Successful
26 December 1978; 13:30	Kosmos 1067 (Sfera)	Low Earth		Geodesy
=== 1979 ===
16 January 1979; 17:37	Kosmos-3M		Plesetsk Site 132/1	Successful
16 January 1979; 17:37	Kosmos 1072 (Parus)	Low Earth		Navigation/Communication
8 February 1979; 10:00	Kosmos-3M		Plesetsk Site 132/2	Successful
8 February 1979; 10:00	Kosmos 1075 (Taifun-1)	Low Earth		Radar calibration
27 February 1979; 17:00	Kosmos-3M		Plesetsk Site 132/2	Successful
27 February 1979; 17:00	Interkosmos 19	Low Earth		Ionosphere research
15 March 1979; 02:58	Kosmos-3M		Plesetsk Site 132/2	Successful
15 March 1979; 02:58	Kosmos 1081/1082/1083/1084/1085/1086/1087/1088 (Strela-1M)	Low Earth		Communication
21 March 1979; 04:13	Kosmos-3M		Plesetsk Site 132/2	Successful
21 March 1979; 04:13	Kosmos 1089 (Parus)	Low Earth		Navigation/Communication
7 April 1979; 06:20	Kosmos-3M		Plesetsk Site 132/1	Successful
7 April 1979; 06:20	Kosmos 1091 (Parus)	Low Earth		Navigation/Communication
11 April 1979; 21:51	Kosmos-3M		Plesetsk Site 132/1	Successful
11 April 1979; 21:51	Kosmos 1092 (Tsikada)	Low Earth		Navigation/Communication
31 May 1979; 17:58	Kosmos-3M		Plesetsk Site 132/1	Successful
31 May 1979; 17:58	Kosmos 1104 (Parus)	Low Earth		Navigation/Communication
7 June 1979; 10:30	Kosmos-3M		Kapustin Yar Site 107/1	Successful
7 June 1979; 10:30	Bhaskara 1	Low Earth	ISRO	Earth observation
28 June 1979; 20:09	Kosmos-3M		Plesetsk Site 132/1	Successful
28 June 1979; 20:09	Kosmos 1110 (Strela-2M)	Low Earth		Communication
6 July 1979; 08:20	Kosmos-3M		Kapustin Yar Site 107/1	Successful
6 July 1979; 08:20	Kosmos 1112 (Taifun-2)	Low Earth		Radar calibration
11 July 1979; 15:41	Kosmos-3M		Plesetsk Site 132/1	Successful
11 July 1979; 15:41	Kosmos 1114 (Tselina-O)	Low Earth		ELINT
28 August 1979; 00:55	Kosmos-3M		Plesetsk Site 132/1	Successful
28 August 1979; 00:55	Kosmos 1125 (Strela-2M)	Low Earth		Communication
25 September 1979; 21:00	Kosmos-3M		Plesetsk Site 132/2	Successful
25 September 1979; 21:00	Kosmos 1130/1131/1132/1133/1134/1135/1136/1137 (Strela-1M)	Low Earth		Communication
11 October 1979; 16:36	Kosmos-3M		Plesetsk Site 132/2	Successful
11 October 1979; 16:36	Kosmos 1140 (Strela-2M)	Low Earth		Communication
16 October 1979; 12:17	Kosmos-3M		Plesetsk Site 132/2	Successful
16 October 1979; 12:17	Kosmos 1141 (Parus)	Low Earth		Navigation/Communication
1 November 1979; 08:05	Kosmos-3M		Plesetsk Site 132/2	Successful
1 November 1979; 08:05	Interkosmos 20	Low Earth		Earth observation
5 December 1979; 09:00	Kosmos-3M		Plesetsk Site 132/2	Successful
5 December 1979; 09:00	Kosmos 1146 (Taifun-1B)	Low Earth		Radar calibration
=== 1980 ===
14 January 1980; 19:49	Kosmos-3M		Plesetsk Site 132/2	Successful
14 January 1980; 19:49	Kosmos 1150 (Parus)	Low Earth		Navigation/Communication
25 January 1980; 20:36	Kosmos-3M		Plesetsk Site 132/2	Successful
25 January 1980; 20:36	Kosmos 1153 (Parus)	Low Earth		Navigation/Communication
11 February 1980; 23:32	Kosmos-3M		Plesetsk Site 132/2	Successful
11 February 1980; 23:32	Kosmos 1156/1157/1158/1159/1160/1161/1162/1163 (Strela-1M)	Low Earth		Communication
17 March 1980; 21:37	Kosmos-3M		Plesetsk Site 132/1	Successful
17 March 1980; 21:37	Kosmos 1168 (Tsikada)	Low Earth		Navigation/Communication
27 March 1980; 07:30	Kosmos-3M		Plesetsk Site 132/1	Successful
27 March 1980; 07:30	Kosmos 1169 (Taifun-1)	Low Earth		Radar calibration
3 April 1980; 07:40	Kosmos-3M		Plesetsk Site 132/2	Successful
3 April 1980; 07:40	Kosmos 1171 (DS-P1-M)	Low Earth		Anti-satellite weapon test target
14 May 1980; 13:00	Kosmos-3M		Plesetsk Site 132/1	Successful
14 May 1980; 13:00	Kosmos 1179 (Taifun-1B)	Low Earth		Radar calibration
20 May 1980; 09:21	Kosmos-3M		Plesetsk Site 132/2	Successful
20 May 1980; 09:21	Kosmos 1181 (Parus)	Low Earth		Navigation/Communication
6 June 1980; 11:00	Kosmos-3M		Plesetsk Site 132/1	Successful
6 June 1980; 11:00	Kosmos 1186 (Taifun-2)	Low Earth		Radar calibration
1 July 1980; 07:12	Kosmos-3M		Plesetsk Site 132/2	Successful
1 July 1980; 07:12	Kosmos 1190 (Strela-2M)	Low Earth		Communication
9 July 1980; 00:42	Kosmos-3M		Plesetsk Site 132/2	Successful
9 July 1980; 00:42	Kosmos 1192/1193/1194/1195/1196/1197/1198/1199 (Strela-1M)	Low Earth		Communication
31 July 1980; 10:20	Kosmos-3M		Kapustin Yar Site 107/1	Successful
31 July 1980; 10:20	Kosmos 1204 (Taifun-2)	Low Earth		Radar calibration
14 October 1980; 20:41	Kosmos-3M		Plesetsk Site 132/1	Successful
14 October 1980; 20:41	Kosmos 1215 (Tselina-O)	Low Earth		ELINT
5 December 1980; 04:23	Kosmos-3M		Plesetsk Site 132/1	Successful
5 December 1980; 04:23	Kosmos 1225 (Parus)	Low Earth		Navigation/Communication
10 December 1980; 20:53	Kosmos-3M		Plesetsk Site 132/1	Successful
10 December 1980; 20:53	Kosmos 1226 (Tsikada)	Low Earth		Navigation/Communication
23 December 1980; 22:48	Kosmos-3M		Plesetsk Site 132/1	Successful
23 December 1980; 22:48	Kosmos 1228/1229/1230/1231/1232/1233/1234/1235 (Strela-1M)	Low Earth		Communication
=== 1981 ===
16 January 1981; 09:00	Kosmos-3M		Plesetsk Site 132/1	Successful
16 January 1981; 09:00	Kosmos 1238 (Taifun-1)	Low Earth		Radar calibration
21 January 1981; 08:29	Kosmos-3M		Plesetsk Site 132/1	Successful
21 January 1981; 08:29	Kosmos 1241 (DS-P1-M)	Low Earth		Anti-satellite weapon test target
6 February 1981; 08:00	Kosmos-3M		Plesetsk Site 132/1	Successful
6 February 1981; 08:00	Interkosmos 21	Low Earth		Earth observation
12 February 1981; 18:21	Kosmos-3M		Plesetsk Site 132/1	Successful
12 February 1981; 18:21	Kosmos 1244 (Parus)	Low Earth		Navigation/Communication
6 March 1981; 11:31	Kosmos-3M		Plesetsk Site 132/2	Successful
6 March 1981; 11:31	Kosmos 1250/1251/1252/1253/1254/1255/1256/1257 (Strela-1M)	Low Earth		Communication
9 April 1981; 12:00	Kosmos-3M		Plesetsk Site 132/1	Successful
9 April 1981; 12:00	Kosmos 1263 (Taifun-1)	Low Earth		Radar calibration
7 May 1981; 13:21	Kosmos-3M		Plesetsk Site 132/1	Successful
7 May 1981; 13:21	Kosmos 1269 (Strela-2M)	Low Earth		Communication
4 June 1981; 15:41	Kosmos-3M		Plesetsk Site 132/2	Successful
4 June 1981; 15:41	Kosmos 1275 (Parus)	Low Earth		Navigation/Communication
6 August 1981; 11:49	Kosmos-3M		Plesetsk Site 132/2	Successful
6 August 1981; 11:49	Kosmos 1287/1288/1289/1290/1291/1292/1293/1294 (Strela-1M)	Low Earth		Communication
12 August 1981; 05:46	Kosmos-3M		Plesetsk Site 132/2	Successful
12 August 1981; 05:46	Kosmos 1295 (Parus)	Low Earth		Navigation/Communication
28 August 1981; 16:18	Kosmos-3M		Plesetsk Site 132/1	Successful
28 August 1981; 16:18	Kosmos 1302 (Strela-2M)	Low Earth		Communication
4 September 1981; 11:06	Kosmos-3M		Plesetsk Site 132/1	Successful
4 September 1981; 11:06	Kosmos 1304 (Tsikada)	Low Earth		Navigation/Communication
18 September 1981; 03:34	Kosmos-3M		Plesetsk Site 132/1	Successful
18 September 1981; 03:34	Kosmos 1308 (Parus)	Low Earth		Navigation/Communication
23 September 1981; 08:00	Kosmos-3M		Plesetsk Site 132/2	Successful
23 September 1981; 08:00	Kosmos 1310 (Taifun-1)	Low Earth		Radar calibration
28 September 1981; 21:00	Kosmos-3M		Plesetsk Site 132/2	Successful
28 September 1981; 21:00	Kosmos 1311 (Taifun-2)	Low Earth		Radar calibration
20 November 1981; 08:30	Kosmos-3M		Kapustin Yar Site 107/2	Successful
20 November 1981; 08:30	Bhaskara 2	Low Earth	ISRO	Earth observation
28 November 1981; 18:08	Kosmos-3M		Plesetsk Site 132/2	Successful
28 November 1981; 18:08	Kosmos 1320/1321/1322/1323/1324/1325/1326/1327 (Strela-1M)	Low Earth		Communication
17 December 1981; 11:00	Kosmos-3M		Plesetsk Site 132/2	Successful
17 December 1981; 11:00	Radio Sputnik 3/4/5/6/7/8	Low Earth		Amateur Radio
=== 1982 ===
7 January 1982; 15:38	Kosmos-3M		Plesetsk Site 132/2	Successful
7 January 1982; 15:38	Kosmos 1331 (Strela-2M)	Low Earth		Communication
14 January 1982; 07:51	Kosmos-3M		Plesetsk Site 132/2	Successful
14 January 1982; 07:51	Kosmos 1333 (Parus)	Low Earth		Navigation/Communication
29 January 1982; 11:00	Kosmos-3M		Plesetsk Site 132/1	Successful
29 January 1982; 11:00	Kosmos 1335 (Taifun-2)	Low Earth		Radar calibration
17 February 1982; 21:56	Kosmos-3M		Plesetsk Site 132/2	Successful
17 February 1982; 21:56	Kosmos 1339 (Tsikada)	Low Earth		Navigation/Communication
4 March 1982; 16:41	Kosmos-3M		Kapustin Yar Site 107/1	Failure
4 March 1982; 16:41	Taifun-2	Low Earth (planned)		Radar calibration
24 March 1982; 19:47	Kosmos-3M		Plesetsk Site 132/1	Successful
24 March 1982; 19:47	Kosmos 1344 (Parus)	Low Earth		Navigation/Communication
31 March 1982; 09:00	Kosmos-3M		Plesetsk Site 132/2	Successful
31 March 1982; 09:00	Kosmos 1345 (Tselina-O)	Low Earth		ELINT
8 April 1982; 00:15	Kosmos-3M		Plesetsk Site 132/2	Successful
8 April 1982; 00:15	Kosmos 1349 (Parus)	Low Earth		Navigation/Communication
21 April 1982; 01:40	Kosmos-3M		Kapustin Yar Site 107/1	Successful
21 April 1982; 01:40	Kosmos 1351 (Taifun-2)	Low Earth		Radar calibration
28 April 1982; 02:52	Kosmos-3M		Plesetsk Site 132/1	Successful
28 April 1982; 02:52	Kosmos 1354 (Strela-2M)	Low Earth		Communication
6 May 1982; 18:07	Kosmos-3M		Plesetsk Site 132/2	Successful
6 May 1982; 18:07	Kosmos 1357/1358/1359/1360/1361/1362/1363/1364 (Strela-1M)	Low Earth		Communication
1 June 1982; 04:37	Kosmos-3M		Plesetsk Site 132/1	Successful
1 June 1982; 04:37	Kosmos 1371 (Strela-2M)	Low Earth		Communication
3 June 1982; 21:30	Kosmos-3M K65M-RB		Kapustin Yar Site 107/1	Successful
3 June 1982; 21:30	Kosmos 1374 (BOR-4)	Low Earth		Re-entry test spaceplane
6 June 1982; 17:10	Kosmos-3M		Plesetsk Site 132/2	Successful
6 June 1982; 17:10	Kosmos 1375 (DS-P1-M)	Low Earth		Anti-satellite weapon test target
18 June 1982; 11:58	Kosmos-3M		Plesetsk Site 132/2	Partial Failure
18 June 1982; 11:58	Kosmos 1380 (Parus)	Low Earth		Navigation/Communication
18 June 1982; 11:58	Second stage failure, spacecraft left in useless orbit			
29 June 1982; 21:45	Kosmos-3M		Plesetsk Site 132/1	Successful
29 June 1982; 21:45	Kosmos 1383 (Nadezhda)	Low Earth		Navigation/Communication
7 July 1982; 09:47	Kosmos-3M		Plesetsk Site 132/1	Successful
7 July 1982; 09:47	Kosmos 1386 (Parus)	Low Earth		Navigation/Communication
21 July 1982; 06:31	Kosmos-3M		Plesetsk Site 132/2	Successful
21 July 1982; 06:31	Kosmos 1388/1389/1390/1391/1392/1393/1394/1395 (Strela-1M)	Low Earth		Communication
29 July 1982; 19:40	Kosmos-3M		Kapustin Yar Site 107/1	Successful
29 July 1982; 19:40	Kosmos 1397 (Taifun-2)	Low Earth		Radar calibration
30 August 1982; 19:55	Kosmos-3M		Plesetsk Site 132/2	Failure
30 August 1982; 19:55	Strela-2M	Low Earth (planned)		Communication
19 October 1982; 05:58	Kosmos-3M		Plesetsk Site 132/1	Successful
19 October 1982; 05:58	Kosmos 1417 (Parus)	Low Earth		Navigation/Communication
21 October 1982; 14:00	Kosmos-3M		Kapustin Yar Site 107/1	Successful
21 October 1982; 14:00	Kosmos 1418 (Taifun-1B)	Low Earth		Radar calibration
11 November 1982; 06:14	Kosmos-3M		Plesetsk Site 132/1	Successful
11 November 1982; 06:14	Kosmos 1420 (Strela-2M)	Low Earth		Communication
24 November 1982; 11:00	Kosmos-3M		Plesetsk Site 132/1	Failure
24 November 1982; 11:00	Strela-1M x 8	Low Earth (planned)		Communication
29 December 1982; 12:00	Kosmos-3M		Plesetsk Site 132/1	Successful
29 December 1982; 12:00	Kosmos 1427 (Taifun-1B)	Low Earth		Radar calibration
=== 1983 ===
12 January 1983; 14:02	Kosmos-3M		Plesetsk Site 132/2	Successful
12 January 1983; 14:02	Kosmos 1428 (Parus)	Low Earth		Navigation/Communication
19 January 1983; 02:25	Kosmos-3M		Plesetsk Site 132/1	Successful
19 January 1983; 02:25	Kosmos 1429/1430/1431/1432/1433/1434/1435/1436 (Strela-1M)	Low Earth		Communication
25 January 1983; 12:00	Kosmos-3M		Plesetsk Site 132/2	Failure
25 January 1983; 12:00	Taifun-2	Low Earth (planned)		Radar calibration
25 January 1983; 12:00	First stage engine failure due to excessive vibrations			
15 March 1983; 22:30	Kosmos-3M K65M-RB		Kapustin Yar Site 107/1	Successful
15 March 1983; 22:30	Kosmos 1445 (BOR-4)	Low Earth		Re-entry test spaceplane
24 March 1983; 20:55	Kosmos-3M		Plesetsk Site 132/2	Successful
24 March 1983; 20:55	Kosmos 1447 (Nadezhda)	Low Earth		Navigation/Communication
30 March 1983; 01:10	Kosmos-3M		Plesetsk Site 132/1	Successful
30 March 1983; 01:10	Kosmos 1448 (Parus)	Low Earth		Navigation/Communication
6 April 1983; 12:00	Kosmos-3M		Plesetsk Site 132/2	Successful
6 April 1983; 12:00	Kosmos 1450 (Taifun-1)	Low Earth		Radar calibration
12 April 1983; 18:20	Kosmos-3M		Plesetsk Site 132/2	Successful
12 April 1983; 18:20	Kosmos 1452 (Strela-2M)	Low Earth		Communication
19 April 1983; 12:00	Kosmos-3M		Plesetsk Site 132/2	Successful
19 April 1983; 12:00	Kosmos 1453 (Taifun-2)	Low Earth		Radar calibration
6 May 1983; 03:00	Kosmos-3M		Plesetsk Site 132/2	Successful
6 May 1983; 03:00	Kosmos 1459 (Parus)	Low Earth		Navigation/Communication
19 May 1983; 12:00	Kosmos-3M		Plesetsk Site 132/1	Successful
19 May 1983; 12:00	Kosmos 1463 (Taifun-1B)	Low Earth		Radar calibration
24 May 1983; 02:59	Kosmos-3M		Plesetsk Site 132/1	Successful
24 May 1983; 02:59	Kosmos 1464 (Parus)	Low Earth		Navigation/Communication
26 May 1983; 05:00	Kosmos-3M		Kapustin Yar Site 107/1	Successful
26 May 1983; 05:00	Kosmos 1465 (Taifun-2)	Low Earth		Radar calibration
6 July 1983; 00:31	Kosmos-3M		Plesetsk Site 132/2	Successful
6 July 1983; 00:31	Kosmos 1473/1474/1475/1476/1477/1478/1479/1480 (Strela-1M)	Low Earth		Communication
3 August 1983; 12:40	Kosmos-3M		Plesetsk Site 132/2	Successful
3 August 1983; 12:40	Kosmos 1486 (Strela-2M)	Low Earth		Communication
31 August 1983; 06:30	Kosmos-3M		Kapustin Yar Site 107/1	Successful
31 August 1983; 06:30	Kosmos 1494 (Taifun-2)	Low Earth		Radar calibration
30 September 1983; 11:00	Kosmos-3M		Plesetsk Site 132/1	Successful
30 September 1983; 11:00	Kosmos 1501 (Taifun-2)	Low Earth		Radar calibration
5 October 1983; 12:00	Kosmos-3M		Plesetsk Site 132/1	Successful
5 October 1983; 12:00	Kosmos 1502 (Taifun-1B)	Low Earth		Radar calibration
12 October 1983; 00:20	Kosmos-3M		Plesetsk Site 132/1	Successful
12 October 1983; 00:20	Kosmos 1503 (Strela-2M)	Low Earth		Communication
26 October 1983; 17:20	Kosmos-3M		Plesetsk Site 132/1	Successful
26 October 1983; 17:20	Kosmos 1506 (Tsikada)	Low Earth		Navigation/Communication
11 November 1983; 12:30	Kosmos-3M		Plesetsk Site 132/2	Successful
11 November 1983; 12:30	Kosmos 1508 (Taifun-1)	Low Earth		Radar calibration
8 December 1983; 06:13	Kosmos-3M		Plesetsk Site 132/2	Successful
8 December 1983; 06:13	Kosmos 1513 (Parus)	Low Earth		Navigation/Communication
27 December 1983; 10:00	Kosmos-3M K65M-RB		Kapustin Yar Site 107/1	Successful
27 December 1983; 10:00	Kosmos 1517 (BOR-4)	Low Earth		Re-entry test spaceplane
=== 1984 ===
5 January 1984; 20:09	Kosmos-3M		Plesetsk Site 132/2	Successful
5 January 1984; 20:09	Kosmos 1522/1523/1524/1525/1526/1527/1528/1529 (Strela-1M)	Low Earth		Communication
11 January 1984; 18:08	Kosmos-3M		Plesetsk Site 132/2	Successful
11 January 1984; 18:08	Kosmos 1531 (Parus)	Low Earth		Navigation/Communication
26 January 1984; 12:00	Kosmos-3M		Plesetsk Site 132/2	Successful
26 January 1984; 12:00	Kosmos 1534 (Taifun-1)	Low Earth		Radar calibration
2 February 1984; 17:38	Kosmos-3M		Plesetsk Site 132/1	Successful
2 February 1984; 17:38	Kosmos 1535 (Parus)	Low Earth		Navigation/Communication
21 February 1984; 15:36	Kosmos-3M		Plesetsk Site 132/1	Successful
21 February 1984; 15:36	Kosmos 1538 (Strela-2M)	Low Earth		Communication
11 May 1984; 06:19	Kosmos-3M		Plesetsk Site 132/2	Successful
11 May 1984; 06:19	Kosmos 1550 (Parus)	Low Earth		Navigation/Communication
17 May 1984; 14:43	Kosmos-3M		Plesetsk Site 132/1	Successful
17 May 1984; 14:43	Kosmos 1553 (Tsikada)	Low Earth		Navigation/Communication
28 May 1984; 21:52	Kosmos-3M		Plesetsk Site 132/2	Successful
28 May 1984; 21:52	Kosmos 1559/1560/1561/1562/1563/1564/1565/1566 (Strela-1M)	Low Earth		Communication
8 June 1984; 11:28	Kosmos-3M		Plesetsk Site 132/1	Successful
8 June 1984; 11:28	Kosmos 1570 (Strela-2M)	Low Earth		Communication
21 June 1984; 19:40	Kosmos-3M		Plesetsk Site 132/2	Successful
21 June 1984; 19:40	Kosmos 1574 (Nadezhda)	Low Earth		Navigation/Communication
27 June 1984; 04:59	Kosmos-3M		Plesetsk Site 132/2	Successful
27 June 1984; 04:59	Kosmos 1577 (Parus)	Low Earth		Navigation/Communication
28 June 1984; 13:10	Kosmos-3M		Kapustin Yar Site 107/1	Successful
28 June 1984; 13:10	Kosmos 1578 (Taifun-1B)	Low Earth		Radar calibration
13 September 1984; 15:54	Kosmos-3M		Plesetsk Site 132/1	Successful
13 September 1984; 15:54	Kosmos 1598 (Parus)	Low Earth		Navigation/Communication
27 September 1984; 09:30	Kosmos-3M		Plesetsk Site 132/2	Successful
27 September 1984; 09:30	Kosmos 1601 (Taifun-2)	Low Earth		Radar calibration
11 October 1984; 14:43	Kosmos-3M		Plesetsk Site 132/2	Successful
11 October 1984; 14:43	Kosmos 1605 (Parus)	Low Earth		Navigation/Communication
15 November 1984; 06:40	Kosmos-3M		Plesetsk Site 132/1	Successful
15 November 1984; 06:40	Kosmos 1610 (Parus)	Low Earth		Navigation/Communication
19 December 1984; 03:55	Kosmos-3M K65M-RB		Kapustin Yar Site 107/1	Successful
19 December 1984; 03:55	Kosmos 1614 (BOR-4)	Low Earth		Re-entry test spaceplane
20 December 1984; 13:00	Kosmos-3M		Plesetsk Site 132/2	Successful
20 December 1984; 13:00	Kosmos 1615 (Taifun-1B)	Low Earth		Radar calibration
=== 1985 ===
17 January 1985; 17:46	Kosmos-3M		Plesetsk Site 132/1	Successful
17 January 1985; 17:46	Kosmos 1624 (Strela-2M)	Low Earth		Communication
1 February 1985; 19:36	Kosmos-3M		Plesetsk Site 132/2	Successful
1 February 1985; 19:36	Kosmos 1627 (Parus)	Low Earth		Navigation/Communication
27 February 1985; 12:56	Kosmos-3M		Plesetsk Site 132/1	Successful
27 February 1985; 12:56	Kosmos 1631 (Taifun-1)	Low Earth		Radar calibration
14 March 1985; 01:09	Kosmos-3M		Plesetsk Site 132/2	Successful
14 March 1985; 01:09	Kosmos 1634 (Parus)	Low Earth		Navigation/Communication
21 March 1985; 00:08	Kosmos-3M		Plesetsk Site 132/2	Successful
21 March 1985; 00:08	Kosmos 1635/1636/1637/1638/1639/1640/1641/1642 (Strela-1M)	Low Earth		Communication
30 May 1985; 01:14	Kosmos-3M		Plesetsk Site 132/1	Successful
30 May 1985; 01:14	Kosmos 1655 (Tsikada)	Low Earth		Navigation/Communication
19 June 1985; 11:30	Kosmos-3M		Plesetsk Site 132/2	Successful
19 June 1985; 11:30	Kosmos 1662 (Taifun-2)	Low Earth		Radar calibration
4 September 1985; 07:05	Kosmos-3M		Plesetsk Site 132/1	Successful
4 September 1985; 07:05	Kosmos 1680 (Strela-2M)	Low Earth		Communication
2 October 1985; 09:00	Kosmos-3M		Kapustin Yar Site 107/1	Successful
2 October 1985; 09:00	Kosmos 1688 (Taifun-2)	Low Earth		Radar calibration
23 October 1985; 17:24	Kosmos-3M		Plesetsk Site 133/3	Failure
23 October 1985; 17:24	Parus	Low Earth (planned)		Navigation/Communication
23 October 1985; 17:24	First stage control failure under excessive high altitude winds			
28 November 1985; 13:12	Kosmos-3M		Plesetsk Site 133/3	Successful
28 November 1985; 13:12	Kosmos 1704 (Parus)	Low Earth		Navigation/Communication
19 December 1985; 08:46	Kosmos-3M		Plesetsk Site 132/1	Successful
19 December 1985; 08:46	Kosmos 1709 (Parus)	Low Earth		Navigation/Communication
=== 1986 ===
9 January 1986; 02:48	Kosmos-3M		Plesetsk Site 132/2	Successful
9 January 1986; 02:48	Kosmos 1716/1717/1718/1719/1720/1721/1722/1723 (Strela-1M)	Low Earth		Communication
16 January 1986; 11:38	Kosmos-3M		Plesetsk Site 132/1	Successful
16 January 1986; 11:38	Kosmos 1725 (Parus)	Low Earth		Navigation/Communication
23 January 1986; 18:53	Kosmos-3M		Plesetsk Site 132/1	Successful
23 January 1986; 18:53	Kosmos 1727 (Tsikada)	Low Earth		Navigation/Communication
17 April 1986; 21:02	Kosmos-3M		Plesetsk Site 132/1	Successful
17 April 1986; 21:02	Kosmos 1741 (Strela-2M)	Low Earth		Communication
23 May 1986; 12:54	Kosmos-3M		Plesetsk Site 132/1	Successful
23 May 1986; 12:54	Kosmos 1745 (Parus)	Low Earth		Navigation/Communication
6 June 1986; 03:57	Kosmos-3M		Plesetsk Site 132/2	Successful
6 June 1986; 03:57	Kosmos 1748/1749/1750/1751/1752/1753/1754/1755 (Strela-1M)	Low Earth		Communication
18 June 1986; 20:03	Kosmos-3M		Plesetsk Site 132/1	Successful
18 June 1986; 20:03	Kosmos 1759 (Parus)	Low Earth		Navigation/Communication
16 July 1986; 04:21	Kosmos-3M		Plesetsk Site 133/3	Partial Failure
16 July 1986; 04:21	Kosmos 1763 (Strela-2M)	Low Earth		Communication
16 July 1986; 04:21	Lower than planned orbit reached			
3 September 1986; 09:00	Kosmos-3M		Plesetsk Site 132/1	Successful
3 September 1986; 09:00	Kosmos 1776 (Taifun-2)	Low Earth		Radar calibration
10 September 1986; 01:45	Kosmos-3M		Plesetsk Site 133/3	Successful
10 September 1986; 01:45	Kosmos 1777 (Strela-2M)	Low Earth		Communication
27 October 1986; 12:40	Kosmos-3M		Plesetsk Site 133/3	Successful
27 October 1986; 12:40	Kosmos 1788 (Taifun-1)	Low Earth		Radar calibration
13 November 1986; 06:10	Kosmos-3M		Plesetsk Site 132/2	Successful
13 November 1986; 06:10	Kosmos 1791 (Tsikada)	Low Earth		Navigation/Communication
21 November 1986; 02:00	Kosmos-3M		Plesetsk Site 132/2	Successful
21 November 1986; 02:00	Kosmos 1794/1795/1796/1797/1798/1799/1800/1801 (Strela-1M)	Low Earth		Communication
24 November 1986; 21:43	Kosmos-3M		Plesetsk Site 132/2	Successful
24 November 1986; 21:43	Kosmos 1802 (Parus)	Low Earth		Navigation/Communication
17 December 1986; 17:02	Kosmos-3M		Plesetsk Site 132/1	Successful
17 December 1986; 17:02	Kosmos 1808 (Parus)	Low Earth		Navigation/Communication
=== 1987 ===
21 January 1987; 09:10	Kosmos-3M		Plesetsk Site 132/2	Successful
21 January 1987; 09:10	Kosmos 1814 (Strela-2M)	Low Earth		Communication
22 January 1987; 07:00	Kosmos-3M		Kapustin Yar Site 107/1	Successful
22 January 1987; 07:00	Kosmos 1815 (Taifun-2)	Low Earth		Radar calibration
29 January 1987; 06:15	Kosmos-3M		Plesetsk Site 132/2	Successful
29 January 1987; 06:15	Kosmos 1816 (Tsikada)	Low Earth		Navigation/Communication
18 February 1987; 13:53	Kosmos-3M		Plesetsk Site 132/2	Successful
18 February 1987; 13:53	Kosmos 1821 (Parus)	Low Earth		Navigation/Communication
9 June 1987; 14:45	Kosmos-3M		Plesetsk Site 132/1	Successful
9 June 1987; 14:45	Kosmos 1850 (Strela-2M)	Low Earth		Communication
16 June 1987; 17:51	Kosmos-3M		Plesetsk Site 132/1	Successful
16 June 1987; 17:51	Kosmos 1852/1853/1854/1855/1856/1857/1858/1859 (Strela-1M)	Low Earth		Communication
23 June 1987; 07:38	Kosmos-3M		Plesetsk Site 132/1	Successful
23 June 1987; 07:38	Kosmos 1861 (Tsikada)	Low Earth		Navigation/Communication
6 July 1987; 21:59	Kosmos-3M		Plesetsk Site 132/2	Successful
6 July 1987; 21:59	Kosmos 1864 (Parus)	Low Earth		Navigation/Communication
14 July 1987; 14:00	Kosmos-3M		Plesetsk Site 132/2	Successful
14 July 1987; 14:00	Kosmos 1868 (Taifun-1B)	Low Earth		Radar calibration
14 October 1987; 12:35	Kosmos-3M		Plesetsk Site 133/3	Successful
14 October 1987; 12:35	Kosmos 1891 (Parus)	Low Earth		Navigation/Communication
1 December 1987; 14:15	Kosmos-3M		Plesetsk Site 133/3	Successful
1 December 1987; 14:15	Kosmos 1898 (Strela-2M)	Low Earth		Communication
15 December 1987; 13:30	Kosmos-3M		Plesetsk Site 133/3	Successful
15 December 1987; 13:30	Kosmos 1902 (Taifun-1)	Low Earth		Radar calibration
23 December 1987; 20:22	Kosmos-3M		Plesetsk Site 133/3	Successful
23 December 1987; 20:22	Kosmos 1904 (Parus)	Low Earth		Navigation/Communication
=== 1988 ===
11 March 1988; 00:18	Kosmos-3M		Plesetsk Site 132/1	Successful
11 March 1988; 00:18	Kosmos 1924/1925/1926/1927/1928/1929/1930/1931 (Strela-1M)	Low Earth		Communication
22 March 1988; 14:07	Kosmos-3M		Plesetsk Site 132/1	Successful
22 March 1988; 14:07	Kosmos 1934 (Parus)	Low Earth		Navigation/Communication
5 April 1988; 14:41	Kosmos-3M		Plesetsk Site 133/3	Successful
5 April 1988; 14:41	Kosmos 1937 (Strela-2M)	Low Earth		Communication
21 June 1988; 16:26	Kosmos-3M		Plesetsk Site 133/3	Successful
21 June 1988; 16:26	Kosmos 1954 (Strela-2M)	Low Earth		Communication
14 July 1988; 11:40	Kosmos-3M		Plesetsk Site 132/1	Successful
14 July 1988; 11:40	Kosmos 1958 (Taifun-1)	Low Earth		Radar calibration
18 July 1988; 22:28	Kosmos-3M		Plesetsk Site 133/3	Successful
18 July 1988; 22:28	Kosmos 1959 (Parus)	Low Earth		Navigation/Communication
28 July 1988; 11:20	Kosmos-3M		Plesetsk Site 132/1	Successful
28 July 1988; 11:20	Kosmos 1960 (Taifun-2)	Low Earth		Radar calibration
=== 1989 ===
26 January 1989; 15:36	Kosmos-3M		Plesetsk Site 132/2	Successful
26 January 1989; 15:36	Kosmos 1992 (Strela-2M)	Low Earth		Communication
14 February 1989; 17:00	Kosmos-3M		Plesetsk Site 132/2	Successful
14 February 1989; 17:00	Kosmos 2002 (Duga-K)	Low Earth		Radar calibration
22 February 1989; 03:28	Kosmos-3M		Plesetsk Site 132/2	Successful
22 February 1989; 03:28	Kosmos 2004 (Parus)	Low Earth		Navigation/Communication
24 March 1989; 13:38	Kosmos-3M		Plesetsk Site 132/2	Successful
24 March 1989; 13:38	Kosmos 2008/2009/2010/2011/2012/2013/2014/2015 (Strela-1M)	Low Earth		Communication
4 April 1989; 18:36	Kosmos-3M		Plesetsk Site 132/2	Successful
4 April 1989; 18:36	Kosmos 2016 (Parus)	Low Earth		Navigation/Communication
7 June 1989; 05:12	Kosmos-3M		Plesetsk Site 132/2	Successful
7 June 1989; 05:12	Kosmos 2026 (Parus)	Low Earth		Navigation/Communication
14 June 1989; 12:30	Kosmos-3M		Plesetsk Site 133/3	Successful
14 June 1989; 12:30	Kosmos 2027 (Taifun-1)	Low Earth		Radar calibration
4 July 1989; 15:21	Kosmos-3M		Plesetsk Site 133/3	Successful
4 July 1989; 15:21	Nadezhda 1	Low Earth		Navigation/Communication
25 July 1989; 07:48	Kosmos-3M		Plesetsk Site 133/3	Successful
25 July 1989; 07:48	Kosmos 2034 (Parus)	Low Earth		Navigation/Communication
=== 1990 ===
18 January 1990; 12:52	Kosmos-3M		Plesetsk Site 133/3	Successful
18 January 1990; 12:52	Kosmos 2056 (Strela-2M)	Low Earth		Communication
6 February 1990; 16:30	Kosmos-3M		Plesetsk Site 132/2	Successful
6 February 1990; 16:30	Kosmos 2059 (Duga-K)	Low Earth		Radar calibration
27 February 1990; 20:59	Kosmos-3M		Plesetsk Site 132/2	Successful
27 February 1990; 20:59	Nadezhda 2	Low Earth		Navigation/Communication
20 March 1990; 00:25	Kosmos-3M		Plesetsk Site 133/3	Successful
20 March 1990; 00:25	Kosmos 2061 (Parus)	Low Earth		Navigation/Communication
6 April 1990; 03:13	Kosmos-3M		Plesetsk Site 133/3	Successful
6 April 1990; 03:13	Kosmos 2064/2065/2066/2067/2068/2069/2070/2071 (Strela-1M)	Low Earth		Communication
20 April 1990; 18:41	Kosmos-3M		Plesetsk Site 133/3	Successful
20 April 1990; 18:41	Kosmos 2074 (Parus)	Low Earth		Navigation/Communication
25 April 1990; 13:00	Kosmos-3M		Plesetsk Site 132/2	Successful
25 April 1990; 13:00	Kosmos 2075 (Taifun-2)	Low Earth		Radar calibration
28 August 1990; 15:45	Kosmos-3M		Plesetsk Site 133/3	Successful
28 August 1990; 15:45	Kosmos 2098 (Taifun-1)	Low Earth		Radar calibration
14 September 1990; 05:59	Kosmos-3M		Plesetsk Site 133/3	Successful
14 September 1990; 05:59	Kosmos 2100 (Parus)	Low Earth		Navigation/Communication
10 December 1990; 07:55	Kosmos-3M		Plesetsk Site 133/3	Successful
10 December 1990; 07:55	Kosmos 2112 (Strela-2M)	Low Earth		Communication
=== 1991 ===
29 January 1991; 12:00	Kosmos-3M		Plesetsk Site 133/3	Successful
29 January 1991; 12:00	Informator 1	Low Earth		Communication
5 February 1991; 02:36	Kosmos-3M		Plesetsk Site 133/3	Successful
5 February 1991; 02:36	Kosmos 2123 (Tsikada)	Low Earth		Navigation/Communication
12 February 1991; 02:44	Kosmos-3M		Plesetsk Site 133/3	Successful
12 February 1991; 02:44	Kosmos 2125/2126/2127/2128/2129/2130/2131/2132 (Strela-1M)	Low Earth		Communication
26 February 1991; 04:53	Kosmos-3M		Plesetsk Site 133/3	Successful
26 February 1991; 04:53	Kosmos 2135 (Parus)	Low Earth		Navigation/Communication
12 March 1991; 19:29	Kosmos-3M		Plesetsk Site 133/3	Successful
12 March 1991; 19:29	Nadezhda 3	Low Earth		Navigation/Communication
19 March 1991; 14:30	Kosmos-3M		Plesetsk Site 132/1	Successful
19 March 1991; 14:30	Kosmos 2137 (Taifun-1B)	Low Earth		Radar calibration
16 April 1991; 07:21	Kosmos-3M		Plesetsk Site 132/1	Successful
16 April 1991; 07:21	Kosmos 2142 (Parus)	Low Earth		Navigation/Communication
11 June 1991; 05:42	Kosmos-3M		Plesetsk Site 133/3	Successful
11 June 1991; 05:42	Kosmos 2150 (Strela-2M)	Low Earth		Communication
25 June 1991; 13:20	Kosmos-3M		Plesetsk Site 132/1	Failure
25 June 1991; 13:20	Taifun-2	Low Earth (planned)		Radar calibration
25 June 1991; 13:20	Second stage failed to re-start due to valve leakage			
22 August 1991; 12:35	Kosmos-3M		Plesetsk Site 132/1	Successful
22 August 1991; 12:35	Kosmos 2154 (Parus)	Low Earth		Navigation/Communication
10 October 1991; 14:00	Kosmos-3M		Plesetsk Site 132/1	Successful
10 October 1991; 14:00	Kosmos 2164 (Taifun-1B)	Low Earth		Radar calibration
27 November 1991; 03:30	Kosmos-3M		Plesetsk Site 133/3	Successful
27 November 1991; 03:30	Kosmos 2173 (Parus)	Low Earth		Navigation/Communication
=== 1992 ===
17 February 1992; 22:05	Kosmos-3M		Plesetsk Site 133/3	Successful
17 February 1992; 22:05	Kosmos 2180 (Parus)	Low Earth		Navigation/Communication
9 March 1992; 22:36	Kosmos-3M		Plesetsk Site 132/1	Successful
9 March 1992; 22:36	Kosmos 2181 (Tsikada)	Low Earth		Navigation/Communication
15 April 1992; 07:17	Kosmos-3M		Plesetsk Site 132/1	Successful
15 April 1992; 07:17	Kosmos 2184 (Parus)	Low Earth		Navigation/Communication
3 June 1992; 00:50	Kosmos-3M		Plesetsk Site 133/3	Successful
3 June 1992; 00:50	Kosmos 2187/2188/2189/2190/2191/2192/2193/2194 (Strela-1M)	Low Earth		Communication
1 July 1992; 20:16	Kosmos-3M		Plesetsk Site 133/3	Successful
1 July 1992; 20:16	Kosmos 2195 (Parus)	Low Earth		Navigation/Communication
12 August 1992; 05:44	Kosmos-3M		Plesetsk Site 132/1	Successful
12 August 1992; 05:44	Kosmos 2208 (Strela-2M)	Low Earth		Communication
29 October 1992; 10:40	Kosmos-3M		Plesetsk Site 133/3	Successful
29 October 1992; 10:40	Kosmos 2218 (Parus)	Low Earth		Navigation/Communication
=== 1993 ===
12 January 1993; 11:10	Kosmos-3M		Plesetsk Site 133/3	Successful
12 January 1993; 11:10	Kosmos 2230 (Tsikada)	Low Earth		Navigation/Communication
9 February 1993; 02:57	Kosmos-3M		Plesetsk Site 133/3	Successful
9 February 1993; 02:57	Kosmos 2233 (Parus)	Low Earth		Navigation/Communication
1 April 1993; 18:57	Kosmos-3M		Plesetsk Site 133/3	Successful
1 April 1993; 18:57	Kosmos 2239 (Parus)	Low Earth		Navigation/Communication
16 June 1993; 04:17	Kosmos-3M		Plesetsk Site 132/1	Successful
16 June 1993; 04:17	Kosmos 2251 (Strela-2M)	Low Earth		Communication
16 June 1993; 04:17	Satellite collided with Iridium 33 in orbit on 10 February 2009			
26 October 1993; 13:00	Kosmos-3M		Plesetsk Site 132/1	Successful
26 October 1993; 13:00	Kosmos 2265 (Taifun-1B)	Low Earth		Radar calibration
2 November 1993; 12:10	Kosmos-3M		Plesetsk Site 132/1	Successful
2 November 1993; 12:10	Kosmos 2266 (Parus)	Low Earth		Navigation/Communication
=== 1994 ===
26 April 1994; 02:14	Kosmos-3M		Plesetsk Site 133/3	Successful
26 April 1994; 02:14	Kosmos 2279 (Parus)	Low Earth		Navigation/Communication
14 July 1994; 05:13	Kosmos-3M		Plesetsk Site 133/3	Successful
14 July 1994; 05:13	Nadezhda 4	Low Earth		Navigation/Communication
2 August 1994; 20:00	Kosmos-3M		Plesetsk Site 132/1	Successful
2 August 1994; 20:00	Kosmos 2285 (Obzor)	Low Earth		Reconnaissance
27 September 1994; 14:00	Kosmos-3M		Plesetsk Site 132/1	Successful
27 September 1994; 14:00	Kosmos 2292 (Taifun-1)	Low Earth		Radar calibration
20 December 1994; 05:11	Kosmos-3M		Plesetsk Site 132/1	Successful
20 December 1994; 05:11	Kosmos 2298 (Strela-2M)	Low Earth		Communication
=== 1995 ===
24 January 1995; 03:54	Kosmos-3M		Plesetsk Site 132/1	Successful
24 January 1995; 03:54	Tsikada 1 FAISAT 1 Astrid 1	Low Earth	Final Analysis Inc. SSC	Navigation/Communication; Communication; Ionosphere research
2 March 1995; 13:00	Kosmos-3M		Plesetsk Site 132/1	Successful
2 March 1995; 13:00	Kosmos 2306 (Taifun-2)	Low Earth		Radar calibration
22 March 1995; 04:09	Kosmos-3M		Plesetsk Site 132/1	Successful
22 March 1995; 04:09	Kosmos 2310 (Parus)	Low Earth		Navigation/Communication
5 July 1995; 03:09	Kosmos-3M		Plesetsk Site 132/1	Successful
5 July 1995; 03:09	Kosmos 2315 (Tsikada)	Low Earth		Navigation/Communication
6 October 1995; 03:23	Kosmos-3M		Plesetsk Site 132/1	Partial Failure
6 October 1995; 03:23	Kosmos 2321 (Parus)	Low Earth		Navigation/Communication
6 October 1995; 03:23	Second stage engine failure during second burn			
=== 1996 ===
16 January 1996; 15:33	Kosmos-3M		Plesetsk Site 132/1	Successful
16 January 1996; 15:33	Kosmos 2327 (Parus)	Low Earth		Navigation/Communication
24 April 1996; 13:00	Kosmos-3M		Plesetsk Site 132/1	Successful
24 April 1996; 13:00	Kosmos 2332 (Taifun-1B)	Low Earth		Radar calibration
5 September 1996; 12:47	Kosmos-3M		Plesetsk Site 132/1	Successful
5 September 1996; 12:47	Kosmos 2334 (Parus); UNAMSAT B	Low Earth	University of Mexico	Navigation/Communication; Amateur Radio
20 December 1996; 06:44	Kosmos-3M		Plesetsk Site 132/1	Successful
20 December 1996; 06:44	Kosmos 2336 (Parus)	Low Earth		Navigation/Communication
=== 1997 ===
17 April 1997; 13:03	Kosmos-3M		Plesetsk Site 132/1	Successful
17 April 1997; 13:03	Kosmos 2341 (Parus)	Low Earth		Navigation/Communication
23 September 1997; 16:45	Kosmos-3M		Plesetsk Site 132/1	Successful
23 September 1997; 16:45	Kosmos 2346 (Parus); FAISAT 2v	Low Earth	Final Analysis Inc.	Navigation/Communication; Communication
=== 1998 ===
10 December 1998; 11:57	Kosmos-3M		Plesetsk Site 132/1	Successful
10 December 1998; 11:57	Nadezhda 5 Astrid 2	Low Earth	SSC	Navigation/Communication; Ionosphere research
24 December 1998; 20:02	Kosmos-3M		Plesetsk Site 132/1	Successful
24 December 1998; 20:02	Kosmos 2361 (Parus)	Low Earth		Navigation/Communication
=== 1999 ===
28 April 1999; 20:30	Kosmos-3M		Kapustin Yar Site 107/1	Successful
28 April 1999; 20:30	ABRIXAS; Megsat 0	Low Earth	DLR; MegSat	X-ray astronomy Communication
26 August 1999; 12:02	Kosmos-3M		Plesetsk Site 132/1	Successful
26 August 1999; 12:02	Kosmos 2366 (Parus)	Low Earth		Navigation/Communication
=== 2000 ===
28 June 2000; 10:37	Kosmos-3M		Plesetsk Site 132/1	Successful
28 June 2000; 10:37	Nadezhda 6 Tsinghua 1 SNAP 1	Sun-synchronous	Tsinghua University; SSTL	Navigation/Communication; Earth observation Technology
15 July 2000; 12:00	Kosmos-3M		Plesetsk Site 132/1	Successful
15 July 2000; 12:00	CHAMP; MITA; BIRD-Rubin	Low Earth	GFZ; ASI; OHB-System	Earth observation Technology; Communication
20 November 2000; 23:00	Kosmos-3M		Plesetsk Site 132/1	Failure
20 November 2000; 23:00	QuickBird 1	Low Earth (planned)	DigitalGlobe	Earth observation
20 November 2000; 23:00	Second stage engine failed to re-ignite			
=== 2001 ===
8 June 2001; 15:08	Kosmos-3M		Plesetsk Site 132/1	Successful
8 June 2001; 15:08	Kosmos 2378 (Parus)	Low Earth		Navigation/Communication
=== 2002 ===
28 May 2002; 18:14	Kosmos-3M		Plesetsk Site 132/1	Successful
28 May 2002; 18:14	Kosmos 2389 (Parus)	Low Earth		Navigation/Communication
8 July 2002; 06:35	Kosmos-3M		Plesetsk Site 132/1	Successful
8 July 2002; 06:35	Kosmos 2390/2391 (Strela-3)	Low Earth		Communication
26 September 2002; 14:27	Kosmos-3M		Plesetsk Site 132/1	Successful
26 September 2002; 14:27	Nadezhda 7	Low Earth		Navigation/Communication
28 November 2002; 06:07	Kosmos-3M		Plesetsk Site 132/1	Successful
28 November 2002; 06:07	AlSat 1 Mozhayets 3 Rubin 3-DSI	Sun-synchronous	SSTL; A.F. Mozhaysky Military-Space Academy; OHB-System	Earth observation Technology; Communication
=== 2003 ===
4 June 2003; 19:24	Kosmos-3M		Plesetsk Site 132/1	Successful
4 June 2003; 19:24	Kosmos 2398 (Parus)	Low Earth		Navigation/Communication
19 August 2003; 10:50	Kosmos-3M		Plesetsk Site 132/1	Successful
19 August 2003; 10:50	Kosmos 2400/2401 (Strela-3)	Low Earth		Communication
27 September 2003; 06:11	Kosmos-3M		Plesetsk Site 132/1	Successful
27 September 2003; 06:11	UK-DMC 1 NigeriaSat 1 Bilsat 1 STSAT-1; Mozhayets 4 LARETS; Rubin 4-DSI	Sun-synchronous	SSTL; SSTL; SSTL; KAIST; A.F. Mozhaysky Military-Space Academy; IPIE; OHB-System	Earth observation Earth observation Earth observation Technology; Technology; Geodesy; Communication
=== 2004 ===
22 July 2004; 17:46	Kosmos-3M		Plesetsk Site 132/1	Successful
22 July 2004; 17:46	Kosmos 2407 (Parus)	Low Earth		Navigation/Communication
23 September 2004; 15:07	Kosmos-3M		Plesetsk Site 132/1	Successful
23 September 2004; 15:07	Kosmos 2408/2409 (Strela-3)	Low Earth		Communication
=== 2005 ===
20 January 2005; 03:00	Kosmos-3M		Plesetsk Site 132/1	Successful
20 January 2005; 03:00	Kosmos 2414 (Parus); Universitetsky-Tatyana-1	Low Earth	MGU	Navigation/Communication; Technology
27 October 2005; 06:52	Kosmos-3M		Plesetsk Site 132/1	Successful
27 October 2005; 06:52	TopSat 1 China-DMC+4; Sina 1 Mozhayets 5 Rubin 5-ASOLANT	Sun-synchronous	SSTL; SSTL; ISA; A.F. Mozhaysky Military-Space Academy; OHB-System	Earth observation Earth observation Earth observation Technology; Communication
27 October 2005; 06:52	Mozhayets 5 failed to separate from second stage			
21 December 2005; 19:34	Kosmos-3M		Plesetsk Site 132/1	Successful
21 December 2005; 19:34	Gonets-M 1/Kosmos 2416 (Strela-3M)	Low Earth		Communication
=== 2006 ===
19 December 2006; 14:00	Kosmos-3M		Plesetsk Site 132/1	Successful
19 December 2006; 14:00	SAR-Lupe 1	Sun-synchronous	Bundeswehr	Reconnaissance
=== 2007 ===
2 July 2007; 19:38	Kosmos-3M		Plesetsk Site 132/1	Successful
2 July 2007; 19:38	SAR-Lupe 2	Sun-synchronous	Bundeswehr	Reconnaissance
11 September 2007; 13:05	Kosmos-3M		Plesetsk Site 132/1	Successful
11 September 2007; 13:05	Kosmos 2429 (Parus)	Low Earth		Navigation/Communication
1 November 2007; 00:51	Kosmos-3M		Plesetsk Site 132/1	Successful
1 November 2007; 00:51	SAR-Lupe 3	Sun-synchronous	Bundeswehr	Reconnaissance
=== 2008 ===
27 March 2008; 17:16	Kosmos-3M		Plesetsk Site 132/1	Successful
27 March 2008; 17:16	SAR-Lupe 4	Sun-synchronous	Bundeswehr	Reconnaissance
19 June 2008; 06:36	Kosmos-3M		Kapustin Yar Site 107/1	Successful
19 June 2008; 06:36	Orbcomm FM37/FM38/FM39/FM40/FM41/CDS-3	Low Earth	Orbcomm	Communication
22 July 2008; 02:40	Kosmos-3M		Plesetsk Site 132/1	Successful
22 July 2008; 02:40	SAR-Lupe 5	Sun-synchronous	Bundeswehr	Reconnaissance
=== 2009 ===
21 July 2009; 03:57	Kosmos-3M		Plesetsk Site 132/1	Successful
21 July 2009; 03:57	Kosmos 2454 (Parus); Sterkh-1	Low Earth		Navigation/Communication; Communication
=== 2010 ===
16 April 2010; 01:05	Kosmos-3M		Plesetsk Site 132/1	Successful
16 April 2010; 01:05	Kosmos 2463 (Parus)	Low Earth		Navigation/Communication
16 April 2010; 01:05	Final flight of the Kosmos-3M			
