= Kosmos 142 =

Soviet satellite

- Mission type: Ionosphere
- COSPAR ID: 1967-013A
- SATCAT no.: 02678
- Mission duration: 142 days

Spacecraft properties
- Spacecraft type: DS-U2-I
- Manufacturer: Yuzhnoye
- Launch mass: 315 kg

Start of mission
- Launch date: 14 February 1967, 10:04:56 GMT
- Rocket: Kosmos-2I 63SM
- Launch site: Kapustin Yar, Site 86/1
- Contractor: Yuzhnoye

End of mission
- Decay date: 6 July 1967

Orbital parameters
- Reference system: Geocentric
- Regime: Low Earth
- Perigee altitude: 207 km
- Apogee altitude: 1336 km
- Inclination: 48.4°
- Period: 100.3 minutes
- Epoch: 14 February 1967

Kosmos 142 (Russian: Космос 142 meaning Cosmos 142), also known as DS-U2-I No.2, was a Soviet satellite which was launched in 1967 as part of the Dnepropetrovsk Sputnik programme. It was a 315 kilograms (694 lb) spacecraft, which was built by the Yuzhnoye Design Bureau, and was used to study the effects on radio waves of passing through the ionosphere.

A Kosmos-2I 63SM carrier rocket was used to launch Kosmos 142 into low Earth orbit. The launch took place from Site 86/1 at Kapustin Yar. The launch occurred at 10:04:56 GMT on 14 February 1967, and resulted in the successful insertion of the satellite into orbit. Upon reaching orbit, the satellite was assigned its Kosmos designation, and received the International Designator 1967-013A. The North American Air Defense Command assigned it the catalogue number 02678.

Kosmos 142 was the second of three DS-U2-I satellites to be launched. It was operated in an orbit with a perigee of 207 kilometres (129 mi), an apogee of 1,336 kilometres (830 mi), an inclination of 48.4°, and an orbital period of 100.3 minutes. On 6 July 1967, it decayed from orbit and reentered the atmosphere.

== See also ==
- 1967 in spaceflight
