= Kosmos 378 =

Soviet ionosphere studying satellite

- Mission type: Ionospheric
- COSPAR ID: 1970-097A
- SATCAT no.: 04713

Spacecraft properties
- Spacecraft type: DS-U2-IP
- Manufacturer: Yuzhnoye
- Launch mass: 710 kilograms (1,570 lb)

Start of mission
- Launch date: 17 November 1970, 18:20:01 UTC
- Rocket: Kosmos-3M
- Launch site: Plesetsk 132/2

End of mission
- Decay date: 17 August 1972

Orbital parameters
- Reference system: Geocentric
- Regime: Low Earth
- Perigee altitude: 233 kilometres (145 mi)
- Apogee altitude: 1,697 kilometres (1,054 mi)
- Inclination: 74 degrees
- Period: 104.4 minutes

Kosmos 378 (Russian: Космос 378 meaning Cosmos 378), also known as DS-U2-IP No.1, was a Soviet satellite which was launched in 1970 as part of the Dnepropetrovsk Sputnik programme. It was a 710-kilogram (1,570 lb) spacecraft, which was built by the Yuzhnoye Design Bureau, and was used to study the ionosphere.

== Launch ==
A Kosmos-3M 11K65M carrier rocket, serial number 47117-107, was used to launch Kosmos 378 into low Earth orbit. It was launched at 18:20:01 UTC on 17 November 1970, from Site 132/2 at the Plesetsk Cosmodrome. The launch resulted in the successful insertion of the satellite into orbit. Upon reaching orbit, the satellite was assigned its Kosmos designation, and received the International Designator 1970-097A. The North American Aerospace Defense Command assigned it the catalogue number 04713.

== Orbit ==
Kosmos 378 was the only DS-U2-IP satellite to be launched. It was operated in an orbit with a perigee of 233 kilometres (145 mi), an apogee of 1,697 kilometres (1,054 mi), 74 degrees of inclination, and an orbital period of 104.4 minutes. It completed operations on 13 September 1971, before decaying from orbit and reentering the atmosphere on 17 August 1972.
