= Tsikada =

Tsikada (Russian: Цикада meaning cicada) was a Soviet satellite navigation system including ten Low Earth Orbit (LEO) satellites. It transmitted the same two carrier frequencies as the U.S. TRANSIT satellite system. The first satellite was launched in 1974.

== See also ==
- Tsiklon
- Parus
- GLONASS
