= Kosmos 369 =

Soviet satellite

- Mission type: ABM radar target
- COSPAR ID: 1970-081A
- SATCAT no.: 04573

Spacecraft properties
- Spacecraft type: DS-P1-Yu
- Manufacturer: Yuzhnoye
- Launch mass: 325 kilograms (717 lb)

Start of mission
- Launch date: 8 October 1970, 15:10:03 UTC
- Rocket: Kosmos-2I 63SM
- Launch site: Plesetsk 133/1

End of mission
- Decay date: 22 January 1971

Orbital parameters
- Reference system: Geocentric
- Regime: Low Earth
- Perigee altitude: 256 kilometres (159 mi)
- Apogee altitude: 454 kilometres (282 mi)
- Inclination: 70.9 degrees
- Period: 91.6 minutes

Kosmos 369 (Russian: Космос 369 meaning Cosmos 369), known before launch as DS-P1-Yu No.42, was a Soviet satellite which was launched in 1970 as part of the Dnepropetrovsk Sputnik programme. It was a 325-kilogram (717 lb) spacecraft, which was built by the Yuzhnoye Design Bureau, and was used as a radar calibration target for anti-ballistic missile tests.

== Launch ==
The launch of Kosmos 369 took place from Site 133/1 at the Plesetsk Cosmodrome, and used a Kosmos-2I 63SM carrier rocket. The launch occurred at 15:10:03 UTC on 8 October 1970, and successfully deployed Kosmos 369 into low Earth orbit. Upon reaching orbit, it was assigned its Kosmos designation, and received the International Designator 1970-081A.

== Orbit ==
Kosmos 369 was the thirty-sixth of seventy nine DS-P1-Yu satellites to be launched, and the thirty-third of seventy two to successfully reach orbit. It was operated in an orbit with a perigee of 256 kilometres (159 mi), an apogee of 454 kilometres (282 mi), 70.9 degrees of inclination, and an orbital period of 91.6 minutes. It remained in orbit until it decayed and reentered the atmosphere on 22 January 1971.
