= Kosmos 750 =

Soviet satellite launched in 1975

- Mission type: ABM radar target
- COSPAR ID: 1975-067A
- SATCAT no.: 08036

Spacecraft properties
- Spacecraft type: DS-P1-I
- Manufacturer: Yuzhnoye
- Launch mass: 400 kilograms (880 lb)

Start of mission
- Launch date: 17 July 1975, 09:10 UTC
- Rocket: Kosmos-2I 63SM
- Launch site: Plesetsk 133/1

End of mission
- Decay date: 29 September 1977

Orbital parameters
- Reference system: Geocentric
- Regime: Low Earth
- Perigee altitude: 272 kilometres (169 mi)
- Apogee altitude: 803 kilometres (499 mi)
- Inclination: 71 degrees
- Period: 95.4 minutes

Kosmos 750 (Russian: Космос 750 meaning Cosmos 750), also known as DS-P1-I No.15 was a satellite which was used as a radar target for anti-ballistic missile tests. It was launched by the Soviet Union in 1975 as part of the Dnepropetrovsk Sputnik programme.

It was launched aboard a Kosmos-2I 63SM rocket, from Site 133/1 at Plesetsk. The launch occurred at 09:10 UTC on 17 July 1975.

Kosmos 750 was placed into a low Earth orbit with a perigee of 272 kilometres (169 mi), an apogee of 803 kilometres (499 mi), 71 degrees of inclination, and an orbital period of 95.4 minutes. It decayed from orbit on 29 September 1977.

Kosmos 750 was the fifteenth of nineteen DS-P1-I satellites to be launched. Of these, all reached orbit successfully except the seventh.

== See also ==
- 1975 in spaceflight
