= Kosmos 380 =

Soviet radar calibration target satellite

- Mission type: ABM radar target
- COSPAR ID: 1970-100A
- SATCAT no.: 04762

Spacecraft properties
- Spacecraft type: DS-P1-Yu
- Manufacturer: Yuzhnoye
- Launch mass: 250 kilograms (550 lb)

Start of mission
- Launch date: 24 November 1970, 10:59:56 UTC
- Rocket: Kosmos-2I 63SM
- Launch site: Plesetsk 133/1

End of mission
- Decay date: 17 June 1971

Orbital parameters
- Reference system: Geocentric
- Regime: Low Earth
- Perigee altitude: 197 kilometres (122 mi)
- Apogee altitude: 1,374 kilometres (854 mi)
- Inclination: 81.9 degrees
- Period: 100.6 minutes

Kosmos 380 (Russian: Космос 380 meaning Cosmos 380), known before launch as DS-P1-Yu No.26, was a Soviet satellite which was launched in 1970 as part of the Dnepropetrovsk Sputnik programme. It was a 250-kilogram (550 lb) spacecraft, which was built by the Yuzhnoye Design Bureau, and was used as a radar calibration target for anti-ballistic missile tests.

== Launch ==
Kosmos 380 was successfully launched into low Earth orbit on 24 November 1970, with the rocket lifting off at 10:59:56 UTC. The launch took place from Site 133/1 at the Plesetsk Cosmodrome, and used a Kosmos-2I 63SM carrier rocket. Upon reaching orbit, it was assigned its Kosmos designation, and received the International Designator 1970-100A.

== Orbit ==
Kosmos 380 was the thirty-seventh of seventy nine DS-P1-Yu satellites to be launched, and the thirty-fourth of seventy two to successfully reach orbit. It was operated in an orbit with a perigee of 197 kilometres (122 mi), an apogee of 1,374 kilometres (854 mi), 81.9 degrees of inclination, and an orbital period of 100.6 minutes. It remained in orbit until it decayed and reentered the atmosphere on 17 June 1971.
