= Kosmos 362 =

Soviet radar calibration target satellite

- Mission type: ABM radar target
- COSPAR ID: 1970-073A
- SATCAT no.: 04536

Spacecraft properties
- Spacecraft type: DS-P1-I
- Manufacturer: Yuzhnoye
- Launch mass: 300 kilograms (660 lb)

Start of mission
- Launch date: 16 September 1970, 11:59:55 UTC
- Rocket: Kosmos-2I 63SM
- Launch site: Plesetsk 133/1

End of mission
- Decay date: 13 October 1971

Orbital parameters
- Reference system: Geocentric
- Regime: Low Earth
- Perigee altitude: 270 kilometres (170 mi)
- Apogee altitude: 829 kilometres (515 mi)
- Inclination: 71 degrees
- Period: 95.6 minutes

Kosmos 362 (Russian: Космос 362 meaning Cosmos 362), also known as DS-P1-I No.9 was a satellite which was used as a radar target for anti-ballistic missile tests. It was launched by the Soviet Union in 1970 as part of the Dnepropetrovsk Sputnik programme.

== Launch ==
It was launched aboard a Kosmos-2I 63SM rocket, from Site 133/1 at Plesetsk. The launch occurred at 11:59:55 UTC on 16 September 1970.

== Orbit ==
Kosmos 362 was placed into a low Earth orbit with a perigee of 270 kilometres (170 mi), an apogee of 829 kilometres (515 mi), 71 degrees of inclination, and an orbital period of 95.6 minutes. It decayed from orbit on 13 October 1971.

Kosmos 362 was the ninth of nineteen DS-P1-I satellites to be launched. Of these, all reached orbit successfully except the seventh.
