= Kosmos 327 =

Soviet radar target satellite

- Mission type: ABM radar target
- COSPAR ID: 1970-020A
- SATCAT no.: 04351

Spacecraft properties
- Spacecraft type: DS-P1-I
- Manufacturer: Yuzhnoye
- Launch mass: 300 kilograms (660 lb)

Start of mission
- Launch date: 18 March 1970, 14:39:56 UTC
- Rocket: Kosmos-2I 63SM
- Launch site: Plesetsk 133/1

End of mission
- Decay date: 19 January 1971

Orbital parameters
- Reference system: Geocentric
- Regime: Low Earth
- Perigee altitude: 280 kilometres (170 mi)
- Apogee altitude: 819 kilometres (509 mi)
- Inclination: 71 degrees
- Period: 95.7 minutes

Kosmos 327 (Russian: Космос 327 meaning Cosmos 327), also known as DS-P1-I No.8 was a satellite which was used as a radar target for anti-ballistic missile tests. It was launched by the Soviet Union in 1970 as part of the Dnepropetrovsk Sputnik programme.

== Launch ==
It was launched aboard a Kosmos-2I 63SM rocket, from Site 133/1 at Plesetsk. The launch occurred at 14:39:56 UTC on 18 March 1970.

== Orbit ==
Kosmos 327 was placed into a low Earth orbit with a perigee of 280 kilometres (170 mi), an apogee of 819 kilometres (509 mi), 71 degrees of inclination, and an orbital period of 95.7 minutes. It decayed from orbit on 19 January 1971.

Kosmos 327 was the eighth of nineteen DS-P1-I satellites to be launched. Of these, all reached orbit successfully except the seventh.
