= Kosmos 319 =

Soviet radar calibration target satellite

- Mission type: ABM radar target
- COSPAR ID: 1970-004A
- SATCAT no.: 04299

Spacecraft properties
- Spacecraft type: DS-P1-Yu
- Manufacturer: Yuzhnoye
- Launch mass: 250 kilograms (550 lb)

Start of mission
- Launch date: 15 January 1970, 13:39:59 UTC
- Rocket: Kosmos-2I 63SM
- Launch site: Plesetsk 133/1

End of mission
- Decay date: 1 July 1970

Orbital parameters
- Reference system: Geocentric
- Regime: Low Earth
- Perigee altitude: 196 kilometres (122 mi)
- Apogee altitude: 1,371 kilometres (852 mi)
- Inclination: 81.9 degrees
- Period: 100.5 minutes

Kosmos 319 (Russian: Космос 319 meaning Cosmos 319), known before launch as DS-P1-Yu No.25, was a Soviet satellite which was launched in 1970 as part of the Dnepropetrovsk Sputnik programme. It was a 250-kilogram (550 lb) spacecraft, which was built by the Yuzhnoye Design Bureau, and was used as a radar calibration target for anti-ballistic missile tests.

== Launch ==
Kosmos 319 was launched from Site 133/1 at the Plesetsk Cosmodrome, atop a Kosmos-2I 63SM carrier rocket. The launch occurred on 15 January 1970 at 13:39:59 UTC, and resulted in the successful deployment of Kosmos 319 into low Earth orbit. Upon reaching orbit, it was assigned its Kosmos designation, and received the International Designator 1970-004A.

== Orbit ==
Kosmos 319 was operated in an orbit with a perigee of 196 kilometres (122 mi), an apogee of 1,371 kilometres (852 mi), 81.9 degrees of inclination, and an orbital period of 100.5 minutes. It remained in orbit until it decayed and reentered the atmosphere on 1 July 1970. It was the twenty-ninth of seventy nine DS-P1-Yu satellites to be launched, and the twenty-seventh of seventy two to successfully reach orbit.
