= Tsiklon (satellite navigation system) =

Soviet satellite navigation system

Tsiklon (meaning cyclone, Russian: Циклон) is the first Soviet satellite navigation system, developed in the former Soviet Union.

From 1967 to 1978 a total of 31 Zaliv satellites were launched onboard Kosmos-3 and Kosmos-3M rockets, from the Kapustin Yar and Plesetsk launch sites. The project was conceived in the 1950s and the draft proposal was approved in 1962, but was not made operational until 1972 due to delays.

The successor satellites to Tsiklon were Parus and Sfera. Currently, Russia operates the GLONASS system.

== See also ==
- Tsikada
