= Kosmos 497 =

Soviet radar calibration satellite

- Mission type: ABM radar target
- COSPAR ID: 1972-048A
- SATCAT no.: 06076

Spacecraft properties
- Spacecraft type: DS-P1-I
- Manufacturer: Yuzhnoye
- Launch mass: 300 kilograms (660 lb)

Start of mission
- Launch date: 30 June 1972, 09:19:49 UTC
- Rocket: Kosmos-2I 63SM
- Launch site: Plesetsk 133/1

End of mission
- Decay date: 7 November 1973

Orbital parameters
- Reference system: Geocentric
- Regime: Low Earth
- Perigee altitude: 271 kilometres (168 mi)
- Apogee altitude: 787 kilometres (489 mi)
- Inclination: 70.9 degrees
- Period: 95.2 minutes

Kosmos 497 (Russian: Космос 497 meaning Cosmos 497), also known as DS-P1-I No.12 was a satellite which was used as a radar target for anti-ballistic missile tests. It was launched by the Soviet Union in 1972 as part of the Dnepropetrovsk Sputnik programme.

It was launched aboard a Kosmos-2I 63SM rocket, from Site 133/1 at Plesetsk. The launch occurred at 09:19:49 UTC on 30 June 1972.

Kosmos 497 was placed into a low Earth orbit with a perigee of 271 kilometres (168 mi), an apogee of 787 kilometres (489 mi), 70.9 degrees of inclination, and an orbital period of 95.2 minutes. It decayed from orbit on 7 November 1973.

Kosmos 497 was the twelfth of nineteen DS-P1-I satellites to be launched. Of these, all reached orbit successfully except the seventh.

== See also ==
- 1972 in spaceflight
