= Kosmos 335 =

Soviet earth atmosphere studying satellite

- Mission type: Atmospheric
- COSPAR ID: 1970-035A
- SATCAT no.: 04380

Spacecraft properties
- Spacecraft type: DS-U1-R
- Manufacturer: Yuzhnoye
- Launch mass: 295 kilograms (650 lb)

Start of mission
- Launch date: 24 April 1970, 22:24:48 UTC
- Rocket: Kosmos-2I 63SM
- Launch site: Kapustin Yar 86/4

End of mission
- Decay date: 22 June 1970

Orbital parameters
- Reference system: Geocentric
- Regime: Low Earth
- Perigee altitude: 247 kilometres (153 mi)
- Apogee altitude: 391 kilometres (243 mi)
- Inclination: 48.4 degrees
- Period: 90.9 minutes

Kosmos 335 (Russian: Космос 335 meaning Cosmos 335), also known as DS-U1-R No.1, was a Soviet satellite which was launched in 1970 as part of the Dnepropetrovsk Sputnik programme. It was a 295-kilogram (650 lb) spacecraft, which was built by the Yuzhnoye Design Bureau, and was used to study spectral ranges in the Earth's atmosphere.

== Launch ==
A Kosmos-2I 63SM carrier rocket was used to launch Kosmos 335 into orbit. The launch took place from Site 86/4 at Kapustin Yar. The launch occurred at 22:24:48 UTC on 24 April 1970, and resulted in the successfully insertion of the satellite into low Earth orbit. Upon reaching orbit, the satellite was assigned its Kosmos designation, and received the International Designator 1970-035A. The North American Aerospace Defense Command assigned it the catalogue number 04380.

== Orbit ==
Kosmos 335 was one of the DS-U1-R satellites. It was operated in an orbit with a perigee of 247 kilometres (153 mi), an apogee of 391 kilometres (243 mi), 48.4 degrees of inclination, and an orbital period of 90.9 minutes. It completed operations on 20 June 1970. On 22 June 1970, it decayed from orbit and reentered the atmosphere.
