= Kosmos 388 =

Soviet radar calibration target satellite

- Mission type: ABM radar target
- COSPAR ID: 1970-112A
- SATCAT no.: 04811

Spacecraft properties
- Spacecraft type: DS-P1-Yu
- Manufacturer: Yuzhnoye
- Launch mass: 325 kilograms (717 lb)

Start of mission
- Launch date: 18 December 1970, 09:39:13 UTC
- Rocket: Kosmos-2I 63SM
- Launch site: Plesetsk 133/1

End of mission
- Decay date: 10 May 1971

Orbital parameters
- Reference system: Geocentric
- Regime: Low Earth
- Perigee altitude: 263 kilometres (163 mi)
- Apogee altitude: 479 kilometres (298 mi)
- Inclination: 70.9 degrees
- Period: 92 minutes

Kosmos 388 (Russian: Космос 388 meaning Cosmos 388), known before launch as DS-P1-Yu No.43, was a Soviet satellite which was launched in 1970 as part of the Dnepropetrovsk Sputnik programme. It was a 325-kilogram (717 lb) spacecraft, which was built by the Yuzhnoye Design Bureau, and was used as a radar calibration target for anti-ballistic missile tests.

== Launch ==
Kosmos 388 was successfully launched into low Earth orbit on 18 December 1970, with the rocket lifting off at 09:39:13 UTC. The launch took place from Site 133/1 at the Plesetsk Cosmodrome, and used a Kosmos-2I 63SM carrier rocket. Upon reaching orbit, it was assigned its Kosmos designation, and received the International Designator 1970-112A.

== Orbit ==
Kosmos 388 was the thirty-eighth of seventy nine DS-P1-Yu satellites to be launched, and the thirty-fifth of seventy two to successfully reach orbit. It was operated in an orbit with a perigee of 263 kilometres (163 mi), an apogee of 479 kilometres (298 mi), 70.9 degrees of inclination, and an orbital period of 92 minutes. It remained in orbit until it decayed and reentered the atmosphere on 10 May 1971.
