= Kosmos 324 =

Soviet radar calibration target satellite

- Mission type: ABM radar target
- COSPAR ID: 1970-014A
- SATCAT no.: 04338

Spacecraft properties
- Spacecraft type: DS-P1-Yu
- Manufacturer: Yuzhnoye
- Launch mass: 325 kilograms (717 lb)

Start of mission
- Launch date: 27 February 1970, 17:24:55 UTC
- Rocket: Kosmos-2I 63SM
- Launch site: Plesetsk 133/1

End of mission
- Decay date: 23 May 1970

Orbital parameters
- Reference system: Geocentric
- Regime: Low Earth
- Perigee altitude: 258 kilometres (160 mi)
- Apogee altitude: 387 kilometres (240 mi)
- Inclination: 71 degrees
- Period: 91 minutes

Kosmos 324 (Russian: Космос 324 meaning Cosmos 324), known before launch as DS-P1-Yu No.32, was a Soviet satellite which was launched in 1970 as part of the Dnepropetrovsk Sputnik programme. It was a 325-kilogram (717 lb) spacecraft, which was built by the Yuzhnoye Design Bureau, and was used as a radar calibration target for anti-ballistic missile tests.

== Launch ==
Kosmos 324 was launched from Site 133/1 at the Plesetsk Cosmodrome, atop a Kosmos-2I 63SM carrier rocket. The launch occurred on 27 February 1970 at 17:24:55 UTC, and resulted in the successful deployment of Kosmos 324 into low Earth orbit. Upon reaching orbit, it was assigned its Kosmos designation, and received the International Designator 1970-014A.

== Orbit ==
Kosmos 324 was the thirtieth of seventy nine DS-P1-Yu satellites to be launched, and the twenty-eighth of seventy two to successfully reach orbit. It was operated in an orbit with a perigee of 258 kilometres (160 mi), an apogee of 387 kilometres (240 mi), 71 degrees of inclination, and an orbital period of 91 minutes. It remained in orbit until it decayed and reentered the atmosphere on 23 May 1970.
