= Kosmos 334 =

Soviet radar calibration target satellite

- Mission type: ABM radar target
- COSPAR ID: 1970-033A
- SATCAT no.: 04378

Spacecraft properties
- Spacecraft type: DS-P1-Yu
- Manufacturer: Yuzhnoye
- Launch mass: 325 kilograms (717 lb)

Start of mission
- Launch date: 23 April 1970, 13:20:00 UTC
- Rocket: Kosmos-2I 63SM
- Launch site: Plesetsk 133/1

End of mission
- Decay date: 9 August 1970

Orbital parameters
- Reference system: Geocentric
- Regime: Low Earth
- Perigee altitude: 259 kilometres (161 mi)
- Apogee altitude: 430 kilometres (270 mi)
- Inclination: 70.9 degrees
- Period: 91.4 minutes

Kosmos 334 (Russian: Космос 334 meaning Cosmos 334), known before launch as DS-P1-Yu No.31, was a Soviet satellite which was launched in 1970 as part of the Dnepropetrovsk Sputnik programme. It was a 325-kilogram (717 lb) spacecraft, which was built by the Yuzhnoye Design Bureau, and was used as a radar calibration target for anti-ballistic missile tests.

== Launch ==
Kosmos 334 was launched from Site 133/1 at the Plesetsk Cosmodrome, atop a Kosmos-2I 63SM carrier rocket. The launch occurred on 23 April 1970 at 13:20:00 UTC, and resulted in the successful deployment of Kosmos 334 into low Earth orbit. Upon reaching orbit, it was assigned its Kosmos designation, and received the International Designator 1970-033A.

== Orbit ==
Kosmos 334 was the thirty-first of seventy nine DS-P1-Yu satellites to be launched, and the twenty-ninth of seventy two to successfully reach orbit. It was operated in an orbit with a perigee of 259 kilometres (161 mi), an apogee of 430 kilometres (270 mi), 70.9 degrees of inclination, and an orbital period of 91.4 minutes. It remained in orbit until it decayed and reentered the atmosphere on 9 August 1970.
