= Kosmos 165 =

Soviet radar calibration target satellite

- Mission type: ABM radar target
- COSPAR ID: 1967-059A
- SATCAT no.: 02842
- Mission duration: 217 days

Spacecraft properties
- Spacecraft type: DS-P1-Yu
- Manufacturer: Yuzhnoye
- Launch mass: 400 kg

Start of mission
- Launch date: 12 June 1967, 18:06:00 GMT
- Rocket: Kosmos-2I 63SM
- Launch site: Plesetsk, Site 133/3
- Contractor: Yuzhnoye

End of mission
- Decay date: 15 January 1968

Orbital parameters
- Reference system: Geocentric
- Regime: Low Earth
- Perigee altitude: 198 km
- Apogee altitude: 1515 km
- Inclination: 81.9°
- Period: 102.1 minutes
- Epoch: 12 June 1967

Kosmos 165 (Russian: Космос 165 meaning Cosmos 165), also known as DS-P1-Yu No.11 was a radar calibration target satellite which was used by the Soviet Union for tests of anti-ballistic missiles. It was a 400 kilograms (880 lb) spacecraft, which was built by the Yuzhnoye Design Office, and launched in 1967 as part of the Dnepropetrovsk Sputnik programme.

Kosmos 165 was launched using a Kosmos-2I 63SM carrier rocket, which flew from Site 133/3 at Plesetsk Cosmodrome. The launch occurred at 18:06:00 GMT on 12 June 1967.

Kosmos 165 separated from its carrier rocket into a low Earth orbit with a perigee of 198 kilometres (123 mi), an apogee of 1,515 kilometres (941 mi), an inclination of 81.9°, and an orbital period of 102.1 minutes. It decayed from orbit on 15 January 1968. Kosmos 165 was the eighth of seventy nine DS-P1-Yu satellites to be launched, and the seventh of seventy two to successfully reach orbit.

== See also ==
- 1967 in spaceflight
