= List of Kosmos satellites (751–1000) =

The designation Kosmos (Russian: Космос meaning Cosmos) is a generic name given to a large number of Soviet, and subsequently Russian, satellites, the first of which was launched in 1962. Satellites given Kosmos designations include military spacecraft, failed probes to the Moon and the planets, prototypes for crewed spacecraft, and scientific spacecraft. This is a list of satellites with Kosmos designations between 751 and 1000.

| Designation | Type | Launch date (GMT) | Carrier rocket | Function | Decay/Destruction* | Remarks |
|---|---|---|---|---|---|---|
| Kosmos 751 | Zenit-2M | 23 July 1975; 13:00 | Voskhod 11A57 | Reconnaissance | 4 August 1975 | |
| Kosmos 752 | Taifun-1 | 24 July 1975; 19:00 | Kosmos-3M 11K65M | Radar target | 28 February 1981 | |
| Kosmos 753 | Zenit-4MK | 31 July 1975; 13:00 | Voskhod 11A57 | Reconnaissance | 13 August 1975 | |
| Kosmos 754 | Zenit-4MK | 13 August 1975; 07:21 | Voskhod 11A57 | Reconnaissance | 26 August 1975 | |
| Kosmos 755 | Parus | 14 August 1975; 13:29 | Kosmos-3M 11K65M | Navigation, Communication | in orbit | |
| Kosmos 756 | Tselina-D | 22 August 1975; 02:11 | Vostok-2M 8A92M | ELINT | 5 November 1992 | |
| Kosmos 757 | Zenit-4MK | 27 August 1975; 14:45 | Voskhod 11A57 | Reconnaissance | 9 September 1975 | |
| Kosmos 758 | Yantar-2K | 5 September 1975; 14:50 | Soyuz-U 11A511U | Reconnaissance | 25 September 1975* | Guidance system malfunctioned, self-destructed |
| Kosmos 759 | Zenit-4MT | 12 September 1975; 05:30 | Soyuz-U 11A511U | Reconnaissance | 23 September 1975 | |
| Kosmos 760 | Zenit-4MK | 16 September 1975; 09:00 | Voskhod 11A57 | Reconnaissance | 30 September 1975 | |
| Kosmos 761 | Strela-1M | 17 September 1975; 07:10 | Kosmos-3M 11K65M | Communication | in orbit | |
| Kosmos 762 | Strela-1M | 17 September 1975; 07:10 | Kosmos-3M 11K65M | Communication | in orbit | |
| Kosmos 763 | Strela-1M | 17 September 1975; 07:10 | Kosmos-3M 11K65M | Communication | in orbit | |
| Kosmos 764 | Strela-1M | 17 September 1975; 07:10 | Kosmos-3M 11K65M | Communication | in orbit | |
| Kosmos 765 | Strela-1M | 17 September 1975; 07:10 | Kosmos-3M 11K65M | Communication | in orbit | |
| Kosmos 766 | Strela-1M | 17 September 1975; 07:10 | Kosmos-3M 11K65M | Communication | in orbit | |
| Kosmos 767 | Strela-1M | 17 September 1975; 07:10 | Kosmos-3M 11K65M | Communication | in orbit | |
| Kosmos 768 | Strela-1M | 17 September 1975; 07:10 | Kosmos-3M 11K65M | Communication | in orbit | |
| Kosmos 769 | Zenit-2M | 23 September 1975; 10:00 | Voskhod 11A57 | Reconnaissance | 5 October 1975 | |
| Kosmos 770 | Sfera | 24 September 1975; 12:00 | Kosmos-3M 11K65M | Geodesy | in orbit | |
| Kosmos 771 | Zenit-4MKT | 25 September 1975; 09:50 | Soyuz-U 11A511U | Reconnaissance | 8 October 1975 | |
| Kosmos 772 | Soyuz 7K-S | 29 September 1975; 04:15 | Soyuz-U 11A511U | Test | 2 October 1975 | |
| Kosmos 773 | Strela-2 | 30 September 1975; 18:38 | Kosmos-3M 11K65M | Communication | in orbit | |
| Kosmos 774 | Zenit-4MK | 1 October 1975; 08:30 | Voskhod 11A57 | Reconnaissance | 15 October 1975 | |
| Kosmos 775 | Oko | 8 October 1975; 00:30 | Proton-K/DM 8K72K | Missile defence | in orbit | |
| Kosmos 776 | Zenit-2M | 17 October 1975; 14:30 | Voskhod 11A57 | Reconnaissance | 29 October 1975 | |
| Kosmos 777 | US-P | 29 October 1975; 11:00 | Tsyklon-2 11K69 | ELINT | 25 January 1976* | Kosmos 777 was the second spacecraft of the Cosmos 699-type to experience a fragmentation. There may have been two fragmentation events on the day it first broke apart. It created dozens of pieces of debris that could not be tracked. |
| Kosmos 778 | Parus | 4 November 1975; 10:13 | Kosmos-3M 11K65M | Navigation, Communication | in orbit | |
| Kosmos 779 | Zenit-4MK | 4 November 1975; 15:20 | Voskhod 11A57 | Reconnaissance | 18 November 1975 | |
| Kosmos 780 | Zenit-2M | 21 November 1975; 09:20 | Voskhod 11A57 | Reconnaissance | 3 December 1975 | |
| Kosmos 781 | Tselina-OK | 21 November 1975; 17:11 | Kosmos-3M 11K65M | ELINT | 26 November 1980 | |
| Kosmos 782 | Bion | 25 November 1975; 17:00 | Soyuz-U 11A511U | Biological | 15 December 1975 | |
| Kosmos 783 | Strela-2 | 28 November 1975; 00:10 | Kosmos-3M 11K65M | Communication | in orbit | |
| Kosmos 784 | Zenit-2M | 3 December 1975; 10:00 | Voskhod 11A57 | Reconnaissance | 15 December 1975 | |
| Kosmos 785 | US-A | 12 December 1975; 12:45 | Tsyklon-2 11K69 | Reconnaissance | 5 February 1976 | |
| Kosmos 786 | Zenit-4MK | 16 December 1975; 09:50 | Voskhod 11A57 | Reconnaissance | 29 December 1975 | |
| Kosmos 787 | Tselina-O | 6 January 1976; 04:52 | Kosmos-3M 11K65M | ELINT | 12 December 1980 | |
| Kosmos 788 | Zenit-4MK | 7 January 1976; 15:35 | Voskhod 11A57 | Reconnaissance | 20 January 1976 | |
| Kosmos 789 | Parus | 20 January 1976; 17:08 | Kosmos-3M 11K65M | Navigation, Communication | in orbit | |
| Kosmos 790 | Tselina-O | 22 January 1976; 22:26 | Kosmos-3M 11K65M | ELINT | 12 November 1980 | |
| Kosmos 791 | Strela-1M | 28 January 1976; 10:39 | Kosmos-3M 11K65M | Communication | in orbit | |
| Kosmos 792 | Strela-1M | 28 January 1976; 10:39 | Kosmos-3M 11K65M | Communication | in orbit | |
| Kosmos 793 | Strela-1M | 28 January 1976; 10:39 | Kosmos-3M 11K65M | Communication | in orbit | |
| Kosmos 794 | Strela-1M | 28 January 1976; 10:39 | Kosmos-3M 11K65M | Communication | in orbit | |
| Kosmos 795 | Strela-1M | 28 January 1976; 10:39 | Kosmos-3M 11K65M | Communication | in orbit | |
| Kosmos 796 | Strela-1M | 28 January 1976; 10:39 | Kosmos-3M 11K65M | Communication | in orbit | |
| Kosmos 797 | Strela-1M | 28 January 1976; 10:39 | Kosmos-3M 11K65M | Communication | in orbit | |
| Kosmos 798 | Strela-1M | 28 January 1976; 10:39 | Kosmos-3M 11K65M | Communication | in orbit | |
| Kosmos 799 | Zenit-2M | 29 January 1976; 08:30 | Voskhod 11A57 | Reconnaissance | 10 February 1976 | |
| Kosmos 800 | Tsiklon | 3 February 1976; 08:16 | Kosmos-3M 11K65M | Navigation | in orbit | |
| Kosmos 801 | DS-P1-I | 5 February 1976; 14:30 | Kosmos-2I 63SM | Radar target | 5 January 1978 | DS-P1-I #16, sixteenth of nineteen DS-P1-Yu satellites |
| Kosmos 802 | Zenit-4MK | 11 February 1976; 08:50 | Voskhod 11A57 | Reconnaissance | 25 February 1976 | |
| Kosmos 803 | Lira | 12 February 1976; 13:00 | Kosmos-3M 11K65M | ASAT target | in orbit | Used for non-destructive tests by Kosmos 804 and Kosmos 814, second of ten Lira satellites |
| Kosmos 804 | IS | 16 February 1976; 08:29 | Tsyklon-2 11K69 | ASAT test | 16 February 1976 | Made non-destructive intercept of Kosmos 803 before being deorbited |
| Kosmos 805 | Yantar-2K | 20 February 1976; 14:01 | Soyuz-U 11A511U | Reconnaissance | 11 March 1976 | |
| Kosmos 806 | Zenit-4MK | 10 March 1976; 08:00 | Soyuz-U 11A511U | Reconnaissance | 23 March 1976 | |
| Kosmos 807 | Taifun-1 | 12 March 1976; 13:30 | Kosmos-3M 11K65M | Radar target | in orbit | |
| Kosmos 808 | Tselina-D | 16 March 1976; 17:22 | Vostok-2M 8A92M | ELINT | 20 November 1993 | |
| Kosmos 809 | Zenit-2M | 18 March 1976; 09:15 | Soyuz-U 11A511U | Reconnaissance | 30 March 1976 | |
| Kosmos 810 | Zenit-4MK | 26 March 1976; 15:00 | Voskhod 11A57 | Reconnaissance | 8 April 1976 | |
| Kosmos 811 | Zenit-4MT | 31 March 1976; 12:50 | Soyuz-M 11A511M | Reconnaissance | 12 April 1976 | |
| Kosmos 812 | Tselina-O | 6 April 1976; 04:14 | Kosmos-3M 11K65M | ELINT | 30 October 1980 | |
| Kosmos 813 | Zenit-2M | 9 April 1976; 08:30 | Voskhod 11A57 | Reconnaissance | 21 April 1976 | |
| Kosmos 814 | IS | 13 April 1976; 17:16 | Tsyklon-2 11K69 | ASAT test | 13 April 1976 | Made non-destructive intercept of Kosmos 803 before being deorbited |
| Kosmos 815 | Zenit-4MK | 28 April 1976; 09:30 | Voskhod 11A57 | Reconnaissance | 11 May 1976 | |
| Kosmos 816 | Taifun-2 | 28 April 1976; 13:30 | Kosmos-3M 11K65M | Calibration | 24 November 1979 | |
| Kosmos 817 | Zenit-4MK | 5 May 1976; 07:50 | Voskhod 11A57 | Reconnaissance | 18 May 1976 | |
| Kosmos 818 | DS-P1-Yu | 18 May 1976; 11:00 | Kosmos-2I 63SM | Radar target | 7 March 1977 | DS-P1-Yu #78, seventy-eighth of seventy nine DS-P1-Yu satellites |
| Kosmos 819 | Zenit-2M | 20 May 1976; 09:00 | Voskhod 11A57 | Reconnaissance | 1 June 1976 | |
| Kosmos 820 | Zenit-4MKT | 21 May 1976; 07:00 | Soyuz-U 11A511U | Reconnaissance | 2 June 1976 | |
| Kosmos 821 | Zenit-4MK | 26 May 1976; 09:00 | Voskhod 11A57 | Reconnaissance | 8 June 1976 | |
| Kosmos 822 | Taifun-1 | 28 May 1976; 15:00 | Kosmos-3M 11K65M | Radar target | 8 August 1978 | |
| Kosmos 823 | Tsiklon | 2 June 1976; 22:30 | Kosmos-3M 11K65M | Navigation | in orbit | |
| Kosmos 824 | Zenit-4MK | 8 June 1976; 07:00 | Voskhod 11A57 | Reconnaissance | 21 June 1976 | |
| Kosmos 825 | Strela-1M | 15 June 1976; 13:19 | Kosmos-3M 11K65M | Communication | in orbit | |
| Kosmos 826 | Strela-1M | 15 June 1976; 13:19 | Kosmos-3M 11K65M | Communication | in orbit | |
| Kosmos 827 | Strela-1M | 15 June 1976; 13:19 | Kosmos-3M 11K65M | Communication | in orbit | |
| Kosmos 828 | Strela-1M | 15 June 1976; 13:19 | Kosmos-3M 11K65M | Communication | in orbit | |
| Kosmos 829 | Strela-1M | 15 June 1976; 13:19 | Kosmos-3M 11K65M | Communication | in orbit | |
| Kosmos 830 | Strela-1M | 15 June 1976; 13:19 | Kosmos-3M 11K65M | Communication | in orbit | |
| Kosmos 831 | Strela-1M | 15 June 1976; 13:19 | Kosmos-3M 11K65M | Communication | in orbit | |
| Kosmos 832 | Strela-1M | 15 June 1976; 13:19 | Kosmos-3M 11K65M | Communication | in orbit | |
| Kosmos 833 | Zenit-4MK | 16 June 1976; 13:10 | Voskhod 11A57 | Reconnaissance | 29 June 1976 | |
| Kosmos 834 | Zenit-2M | 24 June 1976; 07:10 | Soyuz-U 11A511U | Reconnaissance | 6 July 1976 | |
| Kosmos 835 | Zenit-4MK | 29 June 1976; 07:20 | Voskhod 11A57 | Reconnaissance | 12 July 1976 | |
| Kosmos 836 | Strela-2 | 29 June 1976; 08:12 | Kosmos-3M 11K65M | Communication | in orbit | |
| Kosmos 837 | Molniya-2 | 1 July 1976; 08:06 | Molniya-M 8K78M | Communication | 18 November 1983 | |
| Kosmos 838 | US-P | 2 July 1976; 10:30 | Tsyklon-2 11K69 | ELINT | 17 May 1977 | This was the third spacecraft of the Kosmos 699-type to break apart. It had been naturally decaying for 6 months prior to breaking apart. Much of the debris reentered before being officially cataloged. |
| Kosmos 839 | Lira | 8 July 1976; 21:08 | Kosmos-3M 11K65M | ASAT target | 21 July 1976* | Intercepted and destroyed by Kosmos 843, third of ten Lira satellites |
| Kosmos 840 | Zenit-2M | 14 July 1976; 09:00 | Soyuz-U 11A511U | Reconnaissance | 26 July 1976 | |
| Kosmos 841 | Strela-2 | 15 July 1976; 13:11 | Kosmos-3M 11K65M | Communication | in orbit | |
| Kosmos 842 | Sfera | 21 July 1976; 10:20 | Kosmos-3M 11K65M | Geodesy | in orbit | |
| Kosmos 843 | IS | 21 July 1976; 15:14 | Tsyklon-2 11K69 | ASAT test | 21 July 1976* | Intercepted and destroyed Kosmos 839 |
| Kosmos 844 | Yantar-2K | 22 July 1976; 15:40 | Soyuz-U 11A511U | Reconnaissance | 30 August 1976 | Power system malfunctioned |
| Kosmos 845 | Tselina-O | 27 July 1976; 05:21 | Kosmos-3M 11K65M | ELINT | 15 November 1980 | |
| Kosmos 846 | Tsiklon | 29 July 1976; 20:03 | Kosmos-3M 11K65M | Navigation | in orbit | |
| Kosmos 847 | Zenit-4MK | 4 August 1976; 13:40 | Soyuz-U 11A511U | Reconnaissance | 17 August 1976 | |
| Kosmos 848 | Zenit-2M | 12 August 1976; 13:30 | Soyuz-U 11A511U | Reconnaissance | 25 August 1976 | |
| Kosmos 849 | DS-P1-I | 18 August 1976; 09:30 | Kosmos-2I 63SM | Radar target | 24 April 1978 | DS-P1-I #17, seventeenth of nineteen DS-P1-Yu satellites |
| Kosmos 850 | DS-P1-Yu | 26 August 1976; 11:00 | Kosmos-2I 63SM | Radar target | 16 May 1977 | DS-P1-Yu #79, last of seventy nine DS-P1-Yu satellites |
| Kosmos 851 | Tselina-D | 27 August 1976; 14:35 | Vostok-2M 8A92M | ELINT | 5 August 1989 | |
| Kosmos 852 | Zenit-4MK | 28 August 1976; 09:00 | Soyuz-U 11A511U | Reconnaissance | 10 September 1976 | |
| Kosmos 853 | Molniya-2 | 1 September 1976; 03:23 | Molniya-M 8K78M | Communication | 31 December 1976 | |
| Kosmos 854 | Zenit-4MK | 3 September 1976; 09:20 | Soyuz-U 11A511U | Reconnaissance | 16 September 1976 | |
| Kosmos 855 | Zenit-4MT | 21 September 1976; 11:40 | Soyuz-U 11A511U | Reconnaissance | 3 October 1976 | |
| Kosmos 856 | Zenit-2M | 22 September 1976; 09:30 | Soyuz-U 11A511U | Reconnaissance | 5 October 1976 | |
| Kosmos 857 | Zenit-4MK | 24 September 1976; 15:00 | Soyuz-U 11A511U | Reconnaissance | 7 October 1976 | |
| Kosmos 858 | Strela-2 | 29 September 1976; 07:04 | Kosmos-3M 11K65M | Communication | in orbit | |
| Kosmos 859 | Zenit-4MK | 10 October 1976; 09:35 | Soyuz-U 11A511U | Reconnaissance | 21 October 1976 | |
| Kosmos 860 | US-A | 17 October 1976; 18:06 | Tsyklon-2 11K69 | Reconnaissance | 29 December 1976 | |
| Kosmos 861 | US-A | 21 October 1976; 16:53 | Tsyklon-2 11K69 | Reconnaissance | in orbit | |
| Kosmos 862 | Oko | 22 October 1976; 09:12 | Molniya-M 8K78M | Missile defence | 15 May 1977 | Self-destructed |
| Kosmos 863 | Zenit-4MK | 25 October 1976; 14:30 | Soyuz-U 11A511U | Reconnaissance | 5 November 1976 | |
| Kosmos 864 | Parus | 29 October 1976; 12:40 | Kosmos-3M 11K65M | Navigation, Communication | in orbit | |
| Kosmos 865 | Zenit-2M | 1 November 1976; 11:20 | Soyuz-U 11A511U | Reconnaissance | 13 November 1976 | |
| Kosmos 866 | Zenit-4MK | 11 November 1976; 10:45 | Soyuz-U 11A511U | Reconnaissance | 23 November 1976 | |
| Kosmos 867 | Zenit-6 | 23 November 1976; 16:27 | Soyuz-U 11A511U | Reconnaissance | 6 December 1976 | |
| Kosmos 868 | US-P | 26 November 1976; 14:30 | Tsyklon-2 11K69 | ELINT | 8 July 1978 | |
| Kosmos 869 | Soyuz 7K-S | 29 November 1976; 16:00 | Soyuz-U 11A511U | Test | 17 December 1976 | |
| Kosmos 870 | Tselina-O | 2 December 1976; 00:17 | Kosmos-3M 11K65M | ELINT | 20 December 1980 | |
| Kosmos 871 | Strela-1M | 7 December 1976; 10:23 | Kosmos-3M 11K65M | Communication | in orbit | |
| Kosmos 872 | Strela-1M | 7 December 1976; 10:23 | Kosmos-3M 11K65M | Communication | in orbit | |
| Kosmos 873 | Strela-1M | 7 December 1976; 10:23 | Kosmos-3M 11K65M | Communication | in orbit | |
| Kosmos 874 | Strela-1M | 7 December 1976; 10:23 | Kosmos-3M 11K65M | Communication | in orbit | |
| Kosmos 875 | Strela-1M | 7 December 1976; 10:23 | Kosmos-3M 11K65M | Communication | in orbit | |
| Kosmos 876 | Strela-1M | 7 December 1976; 10:23 | Kosmos-3M 11K65M | Communication | in orbit | |
| Kosmos 877 | Strela-1M | 7 December 1976; 10:23 | Kosmos-3M 11K65M | Communication | in orbit | |
| Kosmos 878 | Strela-1M | 7 December 1976; 10:23 | Kosmos-3M 11K65M | Communication | in orbit | |
| Kosmos 879 | Zenit-2M | 9 December 1976; 10:00 | Soyuz-U 11A511U | Reconnaissance | 22 December 1976 | |
| Kosmos 880 | Lira | 9 December 1976; 20:00 | Kosmos-3M 11K65M | ASAT target | 27 December 1976* | Intercepted and destroyed by Kosmos 886, fourth of ten Lira satellites |
| Kosmos 881 | TKS | 15 December 1976; 01:30 | Proton-K 8K72K | Test | 15 December 1976 | |
| Kosmos 882 | TKS | 15 December 1976; 01:30 | Proton-K 8K72K | Test | 15 December 1976 | |
| Kosmos 883 | Tsikada | 15 December 1976; 14:00 | Kosmos-3M 11K65M | Navigation | in orbit | |
| Kosmos 884 | Zenit-4MK | 17 December 1976; 09:30 | Soyuz-U 11A511U | Reconnaissance | 29 December 1976 | |
| Kosmos 885 | Taifun-2 | 17 December 1976; 12:00 | Kosmos-3M 11K65M | Calibration | 14 October 1979 | |
| Kosmos 886 | IS | 27 December 1976; 12:05 | Tsyklon-2 11K69 | ASAT test | 27 December 1976* | Intercepted and destroyed Kosmos 880 |
| Kosmos 887 | Parus | 28 December 1976; 07:50 | Kosmos-3M 11K65M | Navigation, Communication | in orbit | |
| Kosmos 888 | Zenit-4MK | 6 January 1977; 09:40 | Soyuz-U 11A511U | Reconnaissance | 19 January 1977 | |
| Kosmos 889 | Zenit-2M | 20 January 1977; 08:30 | Soyuz-U 11A511U | Reconnaissance | 1 February 1977 | |
| Kosmos 890 | Tsiklon | 20 January 1977; 20:05 | Kosmos-3M 11K65M | Navigation | in orbit | |
| Kosmos 891 | Taifun-1 | 2 February 1977; 12:30 | Kosmos-3M 11K65M | Radar target | 4 February 1981 | |
| Kosmos 892 | Zenit-4MK | 9 February 1977; 11:30 | Soyuz-U 11A511U | Reconnaissance | 22 February 1977 | |
| Kosmos 893 | DS-U2-IK | 15 February 1977; 11:00 | Kosmos-3M 11K65M | Test | 6 October 1984 | |
| Kosmos 894 | Parus | 21 February 1977; 17:20 | Kosmos-3M 11K65M | Navigation, Communication | in orbit | |
| Kosmos 895 | Tselina-D | 26 February 1977; 21:18 | Vostok-2M 8A92M | ELINT | 22 March 1992 | |
| Kosmos 896 | Zenit-6 | 3 March 1977; 10:30 | Soyuz-U 11A511U | Reconnaissance | 16 March 1977 | |
| Kosmos 897 | Zenit-4MK | 10 March 1977; 11:00 | Soyuz-U 11A511U | Reconnaissance | 23 March 1977 | |
| Kosmos 898 | Zenit-2M | 17 March 1977; 08:30 | Soyuz-U 11A511U | Reconnaissance | 30 March 1977 | |
| Kosmos 899 | Tselina-O | 24 March 1977; 22:11 | Kosmos-3M 11K65M | ELINT | 19 October 1980 | |
| Kosmos 900 | AUOS-Z-R-O | 29 March 1977; 23:00 | Kosmos-3M 11K65M | Technology | 11 October 1979 | |
| Kosmos 901 | DS-P1-I | 5 April 1977; 10:30 | Kosmos-2I 63SM | Radar target | 28 June 1978 | DS-P1-I #18, eighteenth of nineteen DS-P1-Yu satellites |
| Kosmos 902 | Zenit-4MK | 7 April 1977; 08:59 | Soyuz-U 11A511U | Reconnaissance | 20 April 1977 | |
| Kosmos 903 | Oko | 11 April 1977; 01:38 | Molniya-M 8K78M | Missile defense | 4 August 2014 | Self-destructed. Some debris remains in orbit |
| Kosmos 904 | Zenit-2M | 20 April 1977; 09:00 | Soyuz-U 11A511U | Reconnaissance | 4 May 1977 | |
| Kosmos 905 | Yantar-2K | 26 April 1977; 14:45 | Soyuz-U 11A511U | Reconnaissance | 26 May 1977 | |
| Kosmos 906 | Taifun-2 | 27 April 1977; 03:30 | Kosmos-3M 11K65M | Radar target | 23 March 1980 | |
| Kosmos 907 | Zenit-4MK | 5 May 1977; 14:00 | Soyuz-U 11A511U | Reconnaissance | 16 May 1977 | |
| Kosmos 908 | Zenit-4MK | 17 May 1977; 10:10 | Soyuz-U 11A511U | Reconnaissance | 31 May 1977 | |
| Kosmos 909 | Lira | 19 May 1977; 16:30 | Kosmos-3M 11K65M | ASAT target | in orbit | Intercept attempts by Kosmos 910 and Kosmos 918 failed, fifth of ten Lira satellites |
| Kosmos 910 | IS | 23 May 1977; 12:14 | Tsyklon-2 11K69 | ASAT test | 23 May 1977 | Failed to intercept Kosmos 909 |
| Kosmos 911 | Sfera | 25 May 1977; 11:00 | Kosmos-3M 11K65M | Geodesy | in orbit | |
| Kosmos 912 | Zenit-4MKT | 26 May 1977; 07:00 | Soyuz-U 11A511U | Reconnaissance | 8 June 1977 | |
| Kosmos 913 | Taifun-2 | 30 May 1977; 22:30 | Kosmos-3M 11K65M | Calibration | 29 December 1979 | |
| Kosmos 914 | Zenit-2M | 31 May 1977; 07:30 | Soyuz-U 11A511U | Reconnaissance | 13 June 1977 | |
| Kosmos 915 | Zenit-4MK | 8 June 1977; 14:00 | Soyuz-U 11A511U | Reconnaissance | 21 June 1977 | |
| Kosmos 916 | Zenit-4MT | 10 June 1977; 08:00 | Soyuz-U 11A511U | Reconnaissance | 21 June 1977 | |
| Kosmos 917 | Oko | 16 June 1977; 01:58 | Molniya-M 8K78M | Missile defence | 8 June 1978 | Self-Destructed on 1978, main piece decayed from orbit on 4 January 2023 |
| Kosmos 918 | IS | 17 June 1977; 07:23 | Tsyklon-2 11K69 | ASAT test | 18 June 1977 | Failed to intercept Kosmos 909 |
| Kosmos 919 | DS-P1-I | 18 June 1977; 10:30 | Kosmos-2I 63SM | Radar target | 28 August 1978 | DS-P1-I #19, last of nineteen DS-P1-Yu satellites |
| Kosmos 920 | Zenit-4MK | 22 June 1977; 08:00 | Soyuz-U 11A511U | Reconnaissance | 5 July 1977 | |
| Kosmos 921 | Tselina-D | 24 June 1977; 10:30 | Tsyklon-3 11K68 | ELINT | in orbit | |
| Kosmos 922 | Zenit-2M | 30 June 1977; 14:00 | Soyuz-U 11A511U | Reconnaissance | 13 July 1977 | |
| Kosmos 923 | Strela-2 | 1 July 1977; 11:52 | Kosmos-3M 11K65M | Communication | in orbit | |
| Kosmos 924 | Tselina-OK | 4 July 1977; 22:20 | Kosmos-3M 11K65M | ELINT | 10 February 1981 | |
| Kosmos 925 | Tselina-D | 7 July 1977; 07:25 | Vostok-2M 8A92M | ELINT | 29 April 1993 | |
| Kosmos 926 | Tsikada | 8 July 1977; 17:30 | Kosmos-3M 11K65M | Navigation | in orbit | |
| Kosmos 927 | Zenit-4MKM | 12 July 1977; 09:00 | Soyuz-U 11A511U | Reconnaissance | 25 July 1977 | |
| Kosmos 928 | Parus | 13 July 1977; 05:02 | Kosmos-3M 11K65M | Navigation, Communication | in orbit | |
| Kosmos 929 | TKS | 17 July 1977; 09:00 | Proton-K 8K72K | Test of 14 meter long module with maneuvering engine . Objective-to increase the size of space stations. | 2 February 1978 | Baikonur launch. Orbit 214 x 278 km. Inclination 52 degrees. Weight-possibly 20 tonnes. A later test flight Kosmos 1267 docked with Salyut 6 and was called the Star Module. |
| Kosmos 930 | Taifun-1 | 19 July 1977; 08:40 | Kosmos-3M 11K65M | Radar target | 12 May 1980 | |
| Kosmos 931 | Oko | 20 July 1977; 04:44 | Molniya-M 8K78M | Missile defense | 24 October 1977 | Self-destructed. Primary piece still in orbit. |
| Kosmos 932 | Zenit-4MKM | 20 July 1977; 07:35 | Soyuz-U 11A511U | Reconnaissance | 2 August 1977 | Baikonur launch. Orbit 150 x 358 km. Inclination 65 degrees. Weight-possibly 4 tonnes. Identified a Republic of South Africa nuclear device that looked like it was about to be exploded in the upper atmosphere. |
| Kosmos 933 | Taifun-1 | 22 July 1977; 10:00 | Kosmos-3M 11K65M | Radar target | 1 November 1978 | |
| Kosmos 934 | Zenit-6 | 27 July 1977; 18:07 | Soyuz-U 11A511U | Reconnaissance | 9 August 1977 | |
| Kosmos 935 | Zenit-2M | 29 July 1977; 08:00 | Soyuz-U 11A511U | Reconnaissance | 11 August 1977 | |
| Kosmos 936 | Bion | 3 August 1977; 14:01 | Soyuz-U 11A511U | Biological | 22 August 1977 | |
| Kosmos 937 | US-P | 24 August 1977; 07:07 | Tsyklon-2 11K69 | ELINT | 19 October 1978 | |
| Kosmos 938 | Zenit-4MKM | 24 August 1977; 14:30 | Soyuz-U 11A511U | Reconnaissance | 6 September 1977 | |
| Kosmos 939 | Strela-1M | 24 August 1977; 18:20 | Kosmos-3M 11K65M | Communication | in orbit | |
| Kosmos 940 | Strela-1M | 24 August 1977; 18:20 | Kosmos-3M 11K65M | Communication | in orbit | |
| Kosmos 941 | Strela-1M | 24 August 1977; 18:20 | Kosmos-3M 11K65M | Communication | in orbit | |
| Kosmos 942 | Strela-1M | 24 August 1977; 18:20 | Kosmos-3M 11K65M | Communication | in orbit | |
| Kosmos 943 | Strela-1M | 24 August 1977; 18:20 | Kosmos-3M 11K65M | Communication | in orbit | |
| Kosmos 944 | Strela-1M | 24 August 1977; 18:20 | Kosmos-3M 11K65M | Communication | in orbit | |
| Kosmos 945 | Strela-1M | 24 August 1977; 18:20 | Kosmos-3M 11K65M | Communication | in orbit | |
| Kosmos 946 | Strela-1M | 24 August 1977; 18:20 | Kosmos-3M 11K65M | Communication | in orbit | |
| Kosmos 947 | Zenit-2M | 27 August 1977; 10:09 | Soyuz-U 11A511U | Reconnaissance | 9 September 1977 | |
| Kosmos 948 | Zenit-4MKT | 2 September 1977; 09:00 | Soyuz-U 11A511U | Reconnaissance | 15 September 1977 | |
| Kosmos 949 | Yantar-2K | 6 September 1977; 17:30 | Soyuz-U 11A511U | Reconnaissance | 6 October 1977 | |
| Kosmos 950 | Zenit-2M | 13 September 1977; 15:10 | Soyuz-U 11A511U | Reconnaissance | 27 September 1977 | |
| Kosmos 951 | Parus | 13 September 1977; 19:59 | Kosmos-3M 11K65M | Navigation, Communication | in orbit | |
| Kosmos 952 | US-A | 16 September 1977; 14:25 | Tsyklon-2 11K69 | Reconnaissance | 7 November 1977 | |
| Kosmos 953 | Zenit-4MKM | 16 September 1977; 14:30 | Soyuz-U 11A511U | Reconnaissance | 29 September 1977 | |
| Kosmos 954 | US-A | 18 September 1977; 13:48 | Tsyklon-2 11K69 | Radar Ocean Surveillance. | 24 January 1978 | Baikonur launch. Orbit 251 x 265 km. Inclination 65 degrees. Weight-possibly 3,500 kg. First failure of a nuclear-powered radar ocean surveillance satellite to maneuver to storage orbit. Nuclear reactor failed to eject, spacecraft reentered over Canada |
| Kosmos 955 | Tselina-D | 20 September 1977; 01:01 | Vostok-2M 8A92M | ELINT | 7 September 2000 | |
| Kosmos 956 | Tselina-D | 24 September 1977; 10:15 | Tsyklon-3 11K68 | Boilerplate test | 27 June 1982 | Launch failure |
| Kosmos 957 | Zenit-4MKM | 30 September 1977; 09:46 | Soyuz-U 11A511U | Reconnaissance | 13 October 1977 | |
| Kosmos 958 | Zenit-6 | 11 October 1977; 15:14 | Soyuz-U 11A511U | Reconnaissance | 24 October 1977 | |
| Kosmos 959 | Lira | 21 October 1977; 10:05 | Kosmos-3M 11K65M | ASAT target | 30 November 1977 | Intercepted by Kosmos 961 in non-destructive test, sixth of ten Lira satellites |
| Kosmos 960 | Tselina-O | 25 October 1977; 05:25 | Kosmos-3M 11K65M | ELINT | 22 October 1980 | |
| Kosmos 961 | IS | 26 October 1977; 05:14 | Tsyklon-2 11K69 | ASAT test | 26 October 1977 | Made non-destructive intercept of Kosmos 959 |
| Kosmos 962 | Tsiklon | 28 October 1977; 16:00 | Kosmos-3M 11K65M | Navigation | in orbit | |
| Kosmos 963 | Sfera | 24 November 1977; 14:30 | Kosmos-3M 11K65M | Geodesy | in orbit | |
| Kosmos 964 | Zenit-4MKM | 4 December 1977; 12:00 | Soyuz-U 11A511U | Reconnaissance | 17 December 1977 | |
| Kosmos 965 | Taifun-2 | 8 December 1977; 11:00 | Kosmos-3M 11K65M | Calibration | 16 December 1979 | |
| Kosmos 966 | Zenit-2M | 12 December 1977; 09:40 | Soyuz-U 11A511U | Reconnaissance | 24 December 1977 | |
| Kosmos 967 | Lira | 13 December 1977; 15:53 | Kosmos-3M 11K65M | ASAT target | in orbit | Intercepted by Kosmos 970 and Kosmos 1009 in non-destructive tests, seventh of ten Lira satellites |
| Kosmos 968 | Strela-2 | 16 December 1977; 04:25 | Kosmos-3M 11K65M | Communication | in orbit | |
| Kosmos 969 | Zenit-4MKM | 20 December 1977; 15:50 | Soyuz-U 11A511U | Reconnaissance | 3 January 1978 | |
| Kosmos 970 | IS | 21 December 1977; 10:35 | Tsyklon-2 11K69 | ASAT test | 21 December 1977* | Made non-destructive intercept of Kosmos 967, self-destruct activated after test. |
| Kosmos 971 | Parus | 23 December 1977; 16:24 | Kosmos-3M 11K65M | Navigation, Communication | in orbit | |
| Kosmos 972 | Tselina-D | 27 December 1977; 08:00 | Tsyklon-3 11K68 | Boilerplate test | in orbit | |
| Kosmos 973 | Zenit-2M | 27 December 1977; 09:20 | Soyuz-U 11A511U | Reconnaissance | 9 January 1978 | |
| Kosmos 974 | Zenit-4MKM | 6 January 1978; 15:50 | Soyuz-U 11A511U | Reconnaissance | 19 January 1978 | |
| Kosmos 975 | Tselina-D | 10 January 1978; 13:23 | Vostok-2M 8A92M | ELINT | 19 September 2001 | |
| Kosmos 976 | Strela-1M | 10 January 1978; 20:51 | Kosmos-3M 11K65M | Communication | in orbit | |
| Kosmos 977 | Strela-1M | 10 January 1978; 20:51 | Kosmos-3M 11K65M | Communication | in orbit | |
| Kosmos 978 | Strela-1M | 10 January 1978; 20:51 | Kosmos-3M 11K65M | Communication | in orbit | |
| Kosmos 979 | Strela-1M | 10 January 1978; 20:51 | Kosmos-3M 11K65M | Communication | in orbit | |
| Kosmos 980 | Strela-1M | 10 January 1978; 20:51 | Kosmos-3M 11K65M | Communication | in orbit | |
| Kosmos 981 | Strela-1M | 10 January 1978; 20:51 | Kosmos-3M 11K65M | Communication | in orbit | |
| Kosmos 982 | Strela-1M | 10 January 1978; 20:51 | Kosmos-3M 11K65M | Communication | in orbit | |
| Kosmos 983 | Strela-1M | 10 January 1978; 20:51 | Kosmos-3M 11K65M | Communication | in orbit | |
| Kosmos 984 | Zenit-2M | 13 January 1978; 15:15 | Soyuz-U 11A511U | Reconnaissance | 26 January 1978 | |
| Kosmos 985 | Parus | 17 January 1978; 03:26 | Kosmos-3M 11K65M | Navigation, Communication | in orbit | |
| Kosmos 986 | Zenit-4MKM | 24 January 1978; 09:50 | Soyuz-U 11A511U | Reconnaissance | 7 February 1978 | |
| Kosmos 987 | Zenit-4MKM | 31 January 1978; 14:50 | Soyuz-U 11A511U | Reconnaissance | 14 February 1978 | |
| Kosmos 988 | Zenit-4MT | 8 February 1978; 12:15 | Soyuz-U 11A511U | Reconnaissance | 20 February 1978 | |
| Kosmos 989 | Zenit-4MKM | 14 February 1978; 09:30 | Soyuz-U 11A511U | Reconnaissance | 28 February 1978 | |
| Kosmos 990 | Strela-2 | 17 February 1978; 16:33 | Kosmos-3M 11K65M | Communication | in orbit | |
| Kosmos 991 | Parus | 28 February 1978; 06:43 | Kosmos-3M 11K65M | Navigation, Communication | in orbit | |
| Kosmos 992 | Zenit-2M | 4 March 1978; 07:40 | Soyuz-U 11A511U | Reconnaissance | 17 March 1978 | |
| Kosmos 993 | Zenit-4MKM | 10 March 1978; 10:42 | Soyuz-U 11A511U | Reconnaissance | 23 March 1978 | |
| Kosmos 994 | Tsiklon | 15 March 1978; 15:57 | Kosmos-3M 11K65M | Navigation | in orbit | |
| Kosmos 995 | Zenit-2M | 17 March 1978; 10:50 | Soyuz-U 11A511U | Reconnaissance | 30 March 1978 | |
| Kosmos 996 | Parus | 28 March 1978; 01:30 | Kosmos-3M 11K65M | Navigation, Communication | in orbit | |
| Kosmos 997 | TKS | 30 March 1978; 00:00 | Proton-K 8K72K | Test | 30 March 1978 | |
| Kosmos 998 | TKS | 30 March 1978; 00:00 | Proton-K 8K72K | Test | 30 March 1978 | |
| Kosmos 999 | Zenit-4MKM | 30 March 1978; 07:50 | Soyuz-U 11A511U | Reconnaissance | 12 April 1978 | |
| Kosmos 1000 | Tsikada | 31 March 1978; 14:01 | Kosmos-3M 11K65M | Navsat System satellite. | in orbit | Plesetsk launch. Orbit 964 x 1,010 km. Inclination 83 degrees. Weight-possibly 700 kg. First satellite acknowledged as part of Navsat System. Kosmos 1000 shape was a cylinder with a dome at each end (this was probably the standard small Kosmos satellite), all enclosed in a drum shaped solar panel, length and diameter about 2 meters. Ship locations were believed to be precision computed using the Doppler Effect. |

* — satellite was destroyed in orbit rather than decaying and burning up in the Earth's atmosphere

== See also ==
- List of USA satellites
