= List of Kosmos satellites (1001–1250) =

The designation Kosmos (Russian: Космос meaning Cosmos) is a generic name given to a large number of Soviet, and subsequently Russian, satellites, the first of which was launched in 1962. Satellites given Kosmos designations include military spacecraft, failed probes to the Moon and the planets, prototypes for crewed spacecraft, and scientific spacecraft. This is a list of satellites with Kosmos designations between 1001 and 1250.

Designation	Type	Launch date (GMT)	Carrier rocket	Function	Decay/Destruction*	Remarks
Kosmos 1001	Soyuz 7K-ST	4 April 1978; 15:00	Soyuz-U 11A511U	First orbital tests of Soyuz T craft in orbit.	15 April 1978	Baikonur launch. Orbit 200 x 228 km. Inclination 52 degrees. Mass-possibly 6,500 kg. Several Soyuz T craft maneuvers. Recovered 11 days later.
Kosmos 1002	Zenit-2M	6 April 1978; 09:10	Soyuz-U 11A511U	Reconnaissance	19 April 1978	
Kosmos 1003	Zenit-4MKM	20 April 1978; 15:30	Soyuz-U 11A511U	Reconnaissance	4 May 1978	
Kosmos 1004	Zenit-2M	5 May 1978; 15:30	Soyuz-U 11A511U	Reconnaissance	18 May 1978	
Kosmos 1005	Tselina-D	12 May 1978; 04:07	Vostok-2M 8A92M	ELINT	15 June 2000	
Kosmos 1006	Taifun-1	12 May 1978; 11:00	Kosmos-3M 11K65M	Radar target	14 March 1979	
Kosmos 1007	Zenit-4MKM	16 May 1978; 10:40	Soyuz-U 11A511U	Reconnaissance	29 May 1978	
Kosmos 1008	Tselina-OK	17 May 1978; 14:39	Kosmos-3M 11K65M	ELINT	8 January 1981	
Kosmos 1009	IS	19 May 1978; 00:21	Tsyklon-2 11K69	ASAT test	19 May 1978	Made non-destructive intercept of Kosmos 967
Kosmos 1010	Zenit-4MKT	23 May 1978; 07:30	Soyuz-U 11A511U	Reconnaissance	5 June 1978	
Kosmos 1011	Parus	23 May 1978; 16:57	Kosmos-3M 11K65M	Navigation, Communication	in orbit	
Kosmos 1012	Zenit-2M	25 May 1978; 14:30	Soyuz-U 11A511U	Reconnaissance	7 June 1978	
Kosmos 1013	Strela-1M	7 June 1978; 22:00	Kosmos-3M 11K65M	Communication	in orbit	
Kosmos 1014	Strela-1M	7 June 1978; 22:00	Kosmos-3M 11K65M	Communication	in orbit	
Kosmos 1015	Strela-1M	7 June 1978; 22:00	Kosmos-3M 11K65M	Communication	in orbit	
Kosmos 1016	Strela-1M	7 June 1978; 22:00	Kosmos-3M 11K65M	Communication	in orbit	
Kosmos 1017	Strela-1M	7 June 1978; 22:00	Kosmos-3M 11K65M	Communication	in orbit	
Kosmos 1018	Strela-1M	7 June 1978; 22:00	Kosmos-3M 11K65M	Communication	in orbit	
Kosmos 1019	Strela-1M	7 June 1978; 22:00	Kosmos-3M 11K65M	Communication	in orbit	
Kosmos 1020	Strela-1M	7 June 1978; 22:00	Kosmos-3M 11K65M	Communication	in orbit	
Kosmos 1021	Zenit-4MKM	10 June 1978; 08:35	Soyuz-U 11A511U	Reconnaissance	23 June 1978	
Kosmos 1022	Zenit-4MKM	12 June 1978; 10:30	Soyuz-U 11A511U	Reconnaissance	25 June 1978	
Kosmos 1023	Strela-2	21 June 1978; 09:27	Kosmos-3M 11K65M	Communication	in orbit	
Kosmos 1024	Oko	28 June 1978; 02:59	Molniya-M 8K78M	Missile defence	in orbit	
Kosmos 1025	Tselina-D	28 June 1978; 17:35	Tsyklon-3 11K68	Boilerplate test	10 March 2007	
Kosmos 1026	Energia	2 July 1978; 09:30	Soyuz-U 11A511U	Magnetospheric	6 July 1978	
Kosmos 1027	Tsiklon	27 July 1978; 04:49	Kosmos-3M 11K65M	Navigation	in orbit	
Kosmos 1028	Yantar-2K	5 August 1978; 15:00	Soyuz-U 11A511U	Reconnaissance	4 September 1978	
Kosmos 1029	Zenit-4MKM	29 August 1978; 15:00	Soyuz-U 11A511U	Reconnaissance	8 September 1978	
Kosmos 1030	Oko	6 September 1978; 03:04	Molniya-M 8K78M	Missile defense	10 October 1978	Self-Destructed. Main piece decayed on 17 August 2004, but several pieces of debris remain.
Kosmos 1031	Zenit-4MKM	9 September 1978; 15:00	Soyuz-U 11A511U	Reconnaissance	22 September 1978	
Kosmos 1032	Zenit-2M	19 September 1978; 08:05	Soyuz-U 11A511U	Reconnaissance	2 October 1978	
Kosmos 1033	Zenit-4MKT	3 October 1978; 11:00	Soyuz-U 11A511U	Reconnaissance	16 October 1978	
Kosmos 1034	Strela-1M	4 October 1978; 03:49	Kosmos-3M 11K65M	Communication	in orbit	
Kosmos 1035	Strela-1M	4 October 1978; 03:49	Kosmos-3M 11K65M	Communication	in orbit	
Kosmos 1036	Strela-1M	4 October 1978; 03:49	Kosmos-3M 11K65M	Communication	in orbit	
Kosmos 1037	Strela-1M	4 October 1978; 03:49	Kosmos-3M 11K65M	Communication	in orbit	
Kosmos 1038	Strela-1M	4 October 1978; 03:49	Kosmos-3M 11K65M	Communication	in orbit	
Kosmos 1039	Strela-1M	4 October 1978; 03:49	Kosmos-3M 11K65M	Communication	in orbit	
Kosmos 1040	Strela-1M	4 October 1978; 03:49	Kosmos-3M 11K65M	Communication	in orbit	
Kosmos 1041	Strela-1M	4 October 1978; 03:49	Kosmos-3M 11K65M	Communication	in orbit	
Kosmos 1042	Zenit-4MKM	6 October 1978; 15:30	Soyuz-U 11A511U	Reconnaissance	19 October 1978	
Kosmos 1043	Tselina-D	10 October 1978; 19:44	Vostok-2M 8A92M	ELINT	28 February 1993	Following the breakup event in 1993, piece of debris broke off that came down 11 days later.
Kosmos 1044	Zenit-2M	17 October 1978; 15:00	Soyuz-U 11A511U	Reconnaissance	30 October 1978	
Kosmos 1045	Meteor-2	26 October 1978; 07:00	Tsyklon-3 11K68	Weather	in orbit	
Kosmos 1046	Zenit-4MT	1 November 1978; 12:00	Soyuz-U 11A511U	Reconnaissance	13 November 1978	
Kosmos 1047	Zenit-4MKM	15 November 1978; 11:45	Soyuz-U 11A511U	Reconnaissance	28 November 1978	
Kosmos 1048	Strela-2	16 November 1978; 21:45	Kosmos-3M 11K65M	Communication	in orbit	
Kosmos 1049	Zenit-4MKM	21 November 1978; 12:00	Soyuz-U 11A511U	Reconnaissance	4 December 1978	
Kosmos 1050	Zenit-6	28 November 1978; 16:20	Soyuz-U 11A511U	Reconnaissance	12 December 1978	
Kosmos 1051	Strela-1M	5 December 1978; 18:12	Kosmos-3M 11K65M	Communication	in orbit	
Kosmos 1052	Strela-1M	5 December 1978; 18:12	Kosmos-3M 11K65M	Communication	in orbit	
Kosmos 1053	Strela-1M	5 December 1978; 18:12	Kosmos-3M 11K65M	Communication	in orbit	
Kosmos 1054	Strela-1M	5 December 1978; 18:12	Kosmos-3M 11K65M	Communication	in orbit	
Kosmos 1055	Strela-1M	5 December 1978; 18:12	Kosmos-3M 11K65M	Communication	in orbit	
Kosmos 1056	Strela-1M	5 December 1978; 18:12	Kosmos-3M 11K65M	Communication	in orbit	
Kosmos 1057	Strela-1M	5 December 1978; 18:12	Kosmos-3M 11K65M	Communication	in orbit	
Kosmos 1058	Strela-1M	5 December 1978; 18:12	Kosmos-3M 11K65M	Communication	in orbit	
Kosmos 1059	Zenit-4MKM	7 December 1978; 15:30	Soyuz-U 11A511U	Reconnaissance	20 December 1978	
Kosmos 1060	Zenit-2M	8 December 1978; 09:30	Soyuz-U 11A511U	Reconnaissance	21 December 1978	
Kosmos 1061	Zenit-2M	14 December 1978; 15:20	Soyuz-U 11A511U	Reconnaissance	27 December 1978	
Kosmos 1062	Tselina-O	15 December 1978; 13:19	Kosmos-3M 11K65M	ELINT	20 April 1981	
Kosmos 1063	Tselina-D	19 December 1978; 01:35	Vostok-2M 8A92M	ELINT	25 November 2001	
Kosmos 1064	Parus	20 December 1978; 20:43	Kosmos-3M 11K65M	Navigation, Communication	12 November 1989	
Kosmos 1065	Romb	22 December 1978; 22:00	Kosmos-3M 11K65M	Calibration	1 August 1979	
Kosmos 1066	Astrofizika	23 December 1978; 08:39	Vostok-2M 8A92M	Astrophysics	in orbit	Also known as Astrofizik 1. May have had military objectives. On August 15, 1991, it experienced an event that caused it to partially break apart.
Kosmos 1067	Sfera	26 December 1978; 13:30	Kosmos-3M 11K65M	Geodesy	in orbit	
Kosmos 1068	Zenit-4MKM	26 December 1978; 15:30	Soyuz-U 11A511U	Reconnaissance	8 January 1979	
Kosmos 1069	Zenit-4MT	28 December 1978; 16:30	Soyuz-U 11A511U	Reconnaissance	10 January 1979	
Kosmos 1070	Zenit-2M	11 January 1979; 15:00	Soyuz-U 11A511U	Reconnaissance	20 January 1979	
Kosmos 1071	Zenit-4MKM	13 January 1979; 15:30	Soyuz-U 11A511U	Reconnaissance	26 January 1979	
Kosmos 1072	Parus	16 January 1979; 17:37	Kosmos-3M 11K65M	Navigation, Communication	in orbit	
Kosmos 1073	Zenit-4MKM	30 January 1979; 15:15	Soyuz-U 11A511U	Reconnaissance	12 February 1979	
Kosmos 1074	Soyuz 7K-ST	31 January 1979; 09:00	Soyuz-U 11A511U	Test	1 April 1979	
Kosmos 1075	Taifun-1	8 February 1979; 10:00	Kosmos-3M 11K65M	Radar target	19 October 1981	
Kosmos 1076	Okean-E	12 February 1979; 13:00	Tsyklon-3 11K68	Oceanography	10 August 2001	
Kosmos 1077	Tselina-D	13 February 1979; 21:41	Vostok-2M 8A92M	ELINT	26 June 2000	
Kosmos 1078	Zenit-4MKM	22 February 1979; 12:10	Soyuz-U 11A511U	Reconnaissance	2 March 1979	
Kosmos 1079	Yantar-2K	27 February 1979; 15:00	Soyuz-U 11A511U	Reconnaissance	11 March 1979	
Kosmos 1080	Zenit-4MKM	14 March 1979; 10:50	Soyuz-U 11A511U	Reconnaissance	28 March 1979	
Kosmos 1081	Strela-1M	15 March 1979; 02:58	Kosmos-3M 11K65M	Communication	in orbit	
Kosmos 1082	Strela-1M	15 March 1979; 02:58	Kosmos-3M 11K65M	Communication	in orbit	
Kosmos 1083	Strela-1M	15 March 1979; 02:58	Kosmos-3M 11K65M	Communication	in orbit	
Kosmos 1084	Strela-1M	15 March 1979; 02:58	Kosmos-3M 11K65M	Communication	in orbit	
Kosmos 1085	Strela-1M	15 March 1979; 02:58	Kosmos-3M 11K65M	Communication	in orbit	
Kosmos 1086	Strela-1M	15 March 1979; 02:58	Kosmos-3M 11K65M	Communication	in orbit	
Kosmos 1087	Strela-1M	15 March 1979; 02:58	Kosmos-3M 11K65M	Communication	in orbit	
Kosmos 1088	Strela-1M	15 March 1979; 02:58	Kosmos-3M 11K65M	Communication	in orbit	
Kosmos 1089	Parus	21 March 1979; 04:13	Kosmos-3M 11K65M	Navigation, Communication	in orbit	
Kosmos 1090	Zenit-2M	31 March 1979; 10:45	Soyuz-U 11A511U	Reconnaissance	13 April 1979	
Kosmos 1091	Parus	7 April 1979; 06:20	Kosmos-3M 11K65M	Navigation, Communication	in orbit	
Kosmos 1092	Tsikada	11 April 1979; 21:51	Kosmos-3M 11K65M	Navigation	in orbit	
Kosmos 1093	Tselina-D	14 April 1979; 05:27	Vostok-2M 8A92M	ELINT	23 March 2000	
Kosmos 1094	US-P	18 April 1979; 12:00	Tsyklon-2 11K69	ELINT	7 November 1979	
Kosmos 1095	Zenit-6	20 April 1979; 11:30	Soyuz-U 11A511U	Reconnaissance	4 May 1979	
Kosmos 1096	US-P	25 April 1979; 10:00	Tsyklon-2 11K69	ELINT	24 November 1979	
Kosmos 1097	Yantar-4K1	27 April 1979; 17:15	Soyuz-U 11A511U	Reconnaissance	27 May 1979	
Kosmos 1098	Zenit-4MKM	15 May 1979; 11:40	Soyuz-U 11A511U	Reconnaissance	28 May 1979	
Kosmos 1099	Zenit-4MKT	17 May 1979; 07:10	Soyuz-U 11A511U	Reconnaissance	30 May 1979	
Kosmos 1100	TKS	22 May 1979; 23:00	Proton-K 8K72K	Test	23 May 1979	
Kosmos 1101	TKS	22 May 1979; 23:00	Proton-K 8K72K	Test	23 May 1979	
Kosmos 1102	Zenit-2M	25 May 1979; 07:00	Soyuz-U 11A511U	Resource detection	7 June 1979	
Kosmos 1103	Zenit-6	31 May 1979; 16:30	Soyuz-U 11A511U	Reconnaissance	14 June 1979	
Kosmos 1104	Parus	31 May 1979; 17:58	Kosmos-3M 11K65M	Navigation, Communication	in orbit	
Kosmos 1105	Zenit-4MKT	8 June 1979; 07:10	Soyuz-U 11A511U	Reconnaissance	21 June 1979	
Kosmos 1106	Zenit-2M	12 June 1979; 07:00	Soyuz-U 11A511U	Resource detection	25 June 1979	
Kosmos 1107	Zenit-6	15 June 1979; 10:50	Soyuz-U 11A511U	Reconnaissance	29 June 1979	
Kosmos 1108	Zenit-4MKT	22 June 1979; 07:00	Soyuz-U 11A511U	Reconnaissance	5 July 1979	
Kosmos 1109	Oko	27 June 1979; 18:11	Molniya-M 8K78M	Missile defense	February 1980	Self Destructed. The primary piece of 1109 is still in orbit, but others have decayed.
Kosmos 1110	Strela-2	28 June 1979; 20:09	Kosmos-3M 11K65M	Communication	in orbit	
Kosmos 1111	Zenit-6	29 June 1979; 16:00	Soyuz-U 11A511U	Reconnaissance	14 July 1979	
Kosmos 1112	Romb	6 July 1979; 08:20	Kosmos-3M 11K65M	Calibration	21 January 1980	
Kosmos 1113	Zenit-4MKM	10 July 1979; 09:00	Soyuz-U 11A511U	Reconnaissance	23 July 1979	
Kosmos 1114	Tselina-O	11 July 1979; 15:41	Kosmos-3M 11K65M	ELINT	26 December 1981	
Kosmos 1115	Zenit-4MKT	13 July 1979; 08:25	Soyuz-U 11A511U	Reconnaissance	26 July 1979	
Kosmos 1116	Tselina-D	20 July 1979; 11:58	Vostok-2M 8A92M	ELINT	11 March 1993	
Kosmos 1117	Zenit-4MKM	25 July 1979; 15:20	Soyuz-U 11A511U	Reconnaissance	7 August 1979	
Kosmos 1118	Zenit-2M	27 July 1979; 07:30	Soyuz-U 11A511U	Resource detection	9 August 1979	
Kosmos 1119	Zenit-4MT	3 August 1979; 10:45	Soyuz-U 11A511U	Reconnaissance	15 August 1979	
Kosmos 1120	Zenit-4MKM	11 August 1979; 09:15	Soyuz-U 11A511U	Reconnaissance	24 August 1979	
Kosmos 1121	Yantar-2K	14 August 1979; 15:30	Soyuz-U 11A511U	Reconnaissance	13 September 1979	
Kosmos 1122	Zenit-2M	17 August 1979; 07:45	Soyuz-U 11A511U	Resource detection	30 August 1979	
Kosmos 1123	Zenit-4MKT	21 August 1979; 11:10	Soyuz-U 11A511U	Reconnaissance	3 September 1979	
Kosmos 1124	Oko	28 August 1979; 00:17	Molniya-M 8K78M	Missile defence	9 September 1979	Self Destructed. All pieces of it are still in orbit.
Kosmos 1125	Strela-2	28 August 1979; 00:55	Kosmos-3M 11K65M	Communication	in orbit	
Kosmos 1126	Zenit-6	31 August 1979; 11:30	Soyuz-U 11A511U	Reconnaissance	14 September 1979	
Kosmos 1127	Resurs-F1	5 September 1979; 10:20	Soyuz-U 11A511U	Remote sensing	18 September 1979	
Kosmos 1128	Zenit-4MKM	14 September 1979; 15:30	Soyuz-U 11A511U	Reconnaissance	27 September 1979	
Kosmos 1129	Bion	25 September 1979; 15:30	Soyuz-U 11A511U	Biological	14 October 1979	
Kosmos 1130	Strela-1M	25 September 1979; 21:00	Kosmos-3M 11K65M	Communication	in orbit	
Kosmos 1131	Strela-1M	25 September 1979; 21:00	Kosmos-3M 11K65M	Communication	in orbit	
Kosmos 1132	Strela-1M	25 September 1979; 21:00	Kosmos-3M 11K65M	Communication	in orbit	
Kosmos 1133	Strela-1M	25 September 1979; 21:00	Kosmos-3M 11K65M	Communication	in orbit	
Kosmos 1134	Strela-1M	25 September 1979; 21:00	Kosmos-3M 11K65M	Communication	in orbit	
Kosmos 1135	Strela-1M	25 September 1979; 21:00	Kosmos-3M 11K65M	Communication	in orbit	
Kosmos 1136	Strela-1M	25 September 1979; 21:00	Kosmos-3M 11K65M	Communication	in orbit	
Kosmos 1137	Strela-1M	25 September 1979; 21:00	Kosmos-3M 11K65M	Communication	in orbit	
Kosmos 1138	Zenit-6	28 September 1979; 12:20	Soyuz-U 11A511U	Reconnaissance	12 October 1979	
Kosmos 1139	Zenit-4MT	5 October 1979; 11:30	Soyuz-U 11A511U	Reconnaissance	18 October 1979	
Kosmos 1140	Strela-2	11 October 1979; 16:36	Kosmos-3M 11K65M	Communication	in orbit	
Kosmos 1141	Parus	16 October 1979; 12:17	Kosmos-3M 11K65M	Navigation, Communication	in orbit	
Kosmos 1142	Zenit-6	22 October 1979; 12:30	Soyuz-U 11A511U	Reconnaissance	4 November 1979	
Kosmos 1143	Tselina-D	26 October 1979; 18:12	Vostok-2M 8A92M	ELINT	17 February 2002	
Kosmos 1144	Yantar-2K	2 November 1979; 16:00	Soyuz-U 11A511U	Reconnaissance	4 December 1979	
Kosmos 1145	Tselina-D	27 November 1979; 09:55	Vostok-2M 8A92M	ELINT	16 June 2000	
Kosmos 1146	Taifun-1B	5 December 1979; 09:00	Kosmos-3M 11K65M	Radar target	25 November 1981	
Kosmos 1147	Zenit-6	12 December 1979; 12:30	Soyuz-U 11A511U	Reconnaissance	26 December 1979	
Kosmos 1148	Zenit-4MKM	28 December 1979; 13:00	Soyuz-U 11A511U	Reconnaissance	10 January 1980	
Kosmos 1149	Zenit-6	9 January 1980; 12:15	Soyuz-U 11A511U	Reconnaissance	23 January 1980	
Kosmos 1150	Parus	14 January 1980; 19:49	Kosmos-3M 11K65M	Navigation, Communication	in orbit	
Kosmos 1151	Okean-E	23 January 1980; 07:00	Tsyklon-3 11K68	Oceanography	4 August 2014	
Kosmos 1152	Yantar-2K	24 January 1980; 15:45	Soyuz-U 11A511U	Reconnaissance	6 February 1980	
Kosmos 1153	Parus	25 January 1980; 20:36	Kosmos-3M 11K65M	Navigation, Communication	in orbit	
Kosmos 1154	Tselina-D	30 January 1980; 12:51	Vostok-2M 8A92M	ELINT	5 November 2002	
Kosmos 1155	Zenit-6	7 February 1980; 11:00	Soyuz-U 11A511U	Reconnaissance	21 February 1980	
Kosmos 1156	Strela-1M	11 February 1980; 23:32	Kosmos-3M 11K65M	Communication	in orbit	
Kosmos 1157	Strela-1M	11 February 1980; 23:32	Kosmos-3M 11K65M	Communication	in orbit	
Kosmos 1158	Strela-1M	11 February 1980; 23:32	Kosmos-3M 11K65M	Communication	in orbit	
Kosmos 1159	Strela-1M	11 February 1980; 23:32	Kosmos-3M 11K65M	Communication	in orbit	
Kosmos 1160	Strela-1M	11 February 1980; 23:32	Kosmos-3M 11K65M	Communication	in orbit	
Kosmos 1161	Strela-1M	11 February 1980; 23:32	Kosmos-3M 11K65M	Communication	in orbit	
Kosmos 1162	Strela-1M	11 February 1980; 23:32	Kosmos-3M 11K65M	Communication	in orbit	
Kosmos 1163	Strela-1M	11 February 1980; 23:32	Kosmos-3M 11K65M	Communication	in orbit	
Kosmos 1164	Oko	12 February 1980; 00:53	Molniya-M 8K78M	Missile defence	12 February 1980	
Kosmos 1165	Zenit-4MKM	21 February 1980; 12:00	Soyuz-U 11A511U	Reconnaissance	5 March 1980	
Kosmos 1166	Zenit-6	4 March 1980; 10:30	Soyuz-U 11A511U	Reconnaissance	18 March 1980	
Kosmos 1167	US-P	14 March 1980; 10:40	Tsyklon-2 11K69	ELINT	1 October 1981	
Kosmos 1168	Tsikada	17 March 1980; 21:37	Kosmos-3M 11K65M	Navigation	in orbit	
Kosmos 1169	Taifun-1	27 March 1980; 07:30	Kosmos-3M 11K65M	Radar target	3 March 1983	
Kosmos 1170	Zenit-4MKM	1 April 1980; 08:00	Soyuz-U 11A511U	Reconnaissance	12 April 1980	
Kosmos 1171	Lira	3 April 1980; 07:40	Kosmos-3M 11K65M	ASAT target	in orbit	Attempted interception by Kosmos 1174 failed, eighth of ten Lira satellites
Kosmos 1172	Oko	12 April 1980; 20:18	Molniya-M 8K78M	Missile defence	26 December 1997	
Kosmos 1173	Zenit-4MKM	17 April 1980; 08:30	Soyuz-U 11A511U	Reconnaissance	28 April 1980	
Kosmos 1174	IS	18 April 1980; 00:51	Tsyklon-2 11K69	ASAT test	20 April 1980	Failed to intercept Kosmos 1171
Kosmos 1175	Molniya-3	18 April 1980; 17:31	Molniya-M 8K78M	Communication	29 September 1980	
Kosmos 1176	US-A	29 April 1980; 11:40	Tsyklon-2 11K69	Reconnaissance	4 October 1980	
Kosmos 1177	Yantar-4K1	29 April 1980; 13:30	Soyuz-U 11A511U	Reconnaissance	12 June 1980	
Kosmos 1178	Zenit-6	7 May 1980; 13:00	Soyuz-U 11A511U	Reconnaissance	22 May 1980	
Kosmos 1179	Taifun-1B	14 May 1980; 13:00	Kosmos-3M 11K65M	Radar target	18 July 1989	
Kosmos 1180	Zenit-4MT	15 May 1980; 05:35	Soyuz-U 11A511U	Reconnaissance	26 May 1980	
Kosmos 1181	Parus	20 May 1980; 09:21	Kosmos-3M 11K65M	Navigation, Communication	in orbit	
Kosmos 1182	Zenit-4MKT	23 May 1980; 07:10	Soyuz-U 11A511U	Reconnaissance	5 June 1980	
Kosmos 1183	Zenit-6	28 May 1980; 12:00	Soyuz-U 11A511U	Reconnaissance	11 June 1980	
Kosmos 1184	Tselina-D	4 June 1980; 07:34	Vostok-2M 8A92M	ELINT	29 April 2002	
Kosmos 1185	Resurs-F1	6 June 1980; 07:00	Soyuz-U 11A511U	Remote sensing	20 June 1980	
Kosmos 1186	Romb	6 June 1980; 11:00	Kosmos-3M 11K65M	Calibration	1 January 1982	
Kosmos 1187	Zenit-6	12 June 1980; 12:30	Soyuz-U 11A511U	Reconnaissance	26 June 1980	
Kosmos 1188	Oko	14 June 1980; 20:52	Molniya-M 8K78M	Missile defence	24 May 2013	
Kosmos 1189	Zenit-6	26 June 1980; 12:20	Soyuz-U 11A511U	Reconnaissance	10 July 1980	
Kosmos 1190	Strela-2	1 July 1980; 07:12	Kosmos-3M 11K65M	Communication	in orbit	
Kosmos 1191	Oko	2 July 1980; 00:54	Molniya-M 8K78M	Missile defence	14 May 1981	Self Destructed. All pieces of it are still in orbit.
Kosmos 1192	Strela-1M	9 July 1980; 00:42	Kosmos-3M 11K65M	Communication	in orbit	
Kosmos 1193	Strela-1M	9 July 1980; 00:42	Kosmos-3M 11K65M	Communication	in orbit	
Kosmos 1194	Strela-1M	9 July 1980; 00:42	Kosmos-3M 11K65M	Communication	in orbit	
Kosmos 1195	Strela-1M	9 July 1980; 00:42	Kosmos-3M 11K65M	Communication	in orbit	
Kosmos 1196	Strela-1M	9 July 1980; 00:42	Kosmos-3M 11K65M	Communication	in orbit	
Kosmos 1197	Strela-1M	9 July 1980; 00:42	Kosmos-3M 11K65M	Communication	in orbit	
Kosmos 1198	Strela-1M	9 July 1980; 00:42	Kosmos-3M 11K65M	Communication	in orbit	
Kosmos 1199	Strela-1M	9 July 1980; 00:42	Kosmos-3M 11K65M	Communication	in orbit	
Kosmos 1200	Zenit-6	9 July 1980; 12:40	Soyuz-U 11A511U	Reconnaissance	23 July 1980	
Kosmos 1201	Zenit-4MKT	15 July 1980; 07:30	Soyuz-U 11A511U	Reconnaissance	28 July 1980	
Kosmos 1202	Zenit-6	24 July 1980; 12:40	Soyuz-U 11A511U	Reconnaissance	7 August 1980	
Kosmos 1203	Resurs-F1	31 July 1980; 07:45	Soyuz-U 11A511U	Remote sensing	14 August 1980	
Kosmos 1204	Romb	31 July 1980; 10:20	Kosmos-3M 11K65M	Calibration	23 February 1981	
Kosmos 1205	Zenit-6	12 August 1980; 11:50	Soyuz-U 11A511U	Reconnaissance	26 August 1980	
Kosmos 1206	Tselina-D	15 August 1980; 05:34	Vostok-2M 8A92M	ELINT	13 January 2002	
Kosmos 1207	Zenit-4MKT	22 August 1980; 10:00	Soyuz-U 11A511U	Reconnaissance	4 September 1980	
Kosmos 1208	Yantar-2K	26 August 1980; 15:30	Soyuz-U 11A511U	Reconnaissance	24 September 1980	
Kosmos 1209	Resurs-F1	3 September 1980; 10:20	Soyuz-U 11A511U	Remote sensing	17 September 1980	
Kosmos 1210	Zenit-6	19 September 1980; 10:10	Soyuz-U 11A511U	Reconnaissance	3 October 1980	
Kosmos 1211	Zenit-4MT	23 September 1980; 10:30	Soyuz-U 11A511U	Reconnaissance	4 October 1980	
Kosmos 1212	Zenit-4MKT	26 September 1980; 10:10	Soyuz-U 11A511U	Reconnaissance	9 October 1980	
Kosmos 1213	Zenit-6	3 October 1980; 12:00	Soyuz-U 11A511U	Reconnaissance	17 October 1980	
Kosmos 1214	Zenit-4MKM	10 October 1980; 13:10	Soyuz-U 11A511U	Reconnaissance	23 October 1980	
Kosmos 1215	Tselina-O	14 October 1980; 20:41	Kosmos-3M 11K65M	ELINT	12 May 1983	
Kosmos 1216	Zenit-6	16 October 1980; 12:20	Soyuz-U 11A511U	Reconnaissance	30 October 1980	
Kosmos 1217	Oko	24 October 1980; 10:53	Molniya-M 8K78M	Missile defence	in orbit	
Kosmos 1218	Yantar-4K1	30 October 1980; 10:00	Soyuz-U 11A511U	Reconnaissance	12 December 1980	
Kosmos 1219	Zenit-6	31 October 1980; 12:00	Soyuz-U 11A511U	Reconnaissance	13 November 1980	
Kosmos 1220	US-P	4 November 1980; 15:04	Tsyklon-2 11K69	ELINT	16 February 2014	
Kosmos 1221	Zenit-6	12 November 1980; 12:21	Soyuz-U 11A511U	Reconnaissance	26 November 1980	
Kosmos 1222	Tselina-D	21 November 1980; 11:53	Vostok-2M 8A92M	ELINT	in orbit	
Kosmos 1223	Oko	27 November 1980; 21:37	Molniya-M 8K78M	Missile defence	in orbit	
Kosmos 1224	Zenit-6	1 December 1980; 12:15	Soyuz-U 11A511U	Reconnaissance	15 December 1980	
Kosmos 1225	Parus	5 December 1980; 04:23	Kosmos-3M 11K65M	Navigation, Communication	in orbit	
Kosmos 1226	Tsikada	10 December 1980; 20:53	Kosmos-3M 11K65M	Navigation	in orbit	
Kosmos 1227	Zenit-6	16 December 1980; 12:15	Soyuz-U 11A511U	Reconnaissance	28 December 1980	
Kosmos 1228	Strela-1M	23 December 1980; 22:48	Kosmos-3M 11K65M	Communication	in orbit	
Kosmos 1229	Strela-1M	23 December 1980; 22:48	Kosmos-3M 11K65M	Communication	in orbit	
Kosmos 1230	Strela-1M	23 December 1980; 22:48	Kosmos-3M 11K65M	Communication	in orbit	
Kosmos 1231	Strela-1M	23 December 1980; 22:48	Kosmos-3M 11K65M	Communication	in orbit	
Kosmos 1232	Strela-1M	23 December 1980; 22:48	Kosmos-3M 11K65M	Communication	in orbit	
Kosmos 1233	Strela-1M	23 December 1980; 22:48	Kosmos-3M 11K65M	Communication	in orbit	
Kosmos 1234	Strela-1M	23 December 1980; 22:48	Kosmos-3M 11K65M	Communication	in orbit	
Kosmos 1235	Strela-1M	23 December 1980; 22:48	Kosmos-3M 11K65M	Communication	in orbit	
Kosmos 1236	Yantar-2K	26 December 1980; 16:10	Soyuz-U 11A511U	Reconnaissance	21 January 1981	
Kosmos 1237	Zenit-6	6 January 1981; 12:15	Soyuz-U 11A511U	Reconnaissance	20 January 1981	
Kosmos 1238	Taifun-1	16 January 1981; 09:00	Kosmos-3M 11K65M	Radar target	in orbit	
Kosmos 1239	Zenit-4MT	16 January 1981; 12:00	Soyuz-U 11A511U	Reconnaissance	28 January 1981	
Kosmos 1240	Yantar-2K	20 January 1981; 11:00	Soyuz-U 11A511U	Reconnaissance	17 February 1981	
Kosmos 1241	Lira	21 January 1981; 08:29	Kosmos-3M 11K65M	ASAT target	in orbit	Intercepted by Kosmos 1243, but attempt to destroy satellite failed, attempted interception by Kosmos 1258 failed, ninth of ten Lira satellites
Kosmos 1242	Tselina-D	27 January 1981; 14:58	Vostok-2M 8A92M	ELINT	9 May 2014	
Kosmos 1243	IS	2 February 1981; 02:19	Tsyklon-2 11K69	ASAT test	2 February 1981	Intercepted Kosmos 1241, explosive charge failed to detonate
Kosmos 1244	Parus	12 February 1981; 18:21	Kosmos-3M 11K65M	Navigation, Communication	in orbit	
Kosmos 1245	Zenit-6	13 February 1981; 11:15	Soyuz-U 11A511U	Reconnaissance	27 February 1981	
Kosmos 1246	Yantar-1KFT	18 February 1981; 09:00	Soyuz-U 11A511U	Reconnaissance	13 March 1981	
Kosmos 1247	Oko	19 February 1981; 10:00	Molniya-M 8K78M	Missile defence	20 October 1981	Self-Destructed. One piece of debris has decayed but the rest are still on orbit.
Kosmos 1248	Yantar-2K	5 March 1981; 15:00	Soyuz-U 11A511U	Reconnaissance	4 April 1981	
Kosmos 1249	US-A	5 March 1981; 18:09	Tsyklon-2 11K69	Reconnaissance	19 July 1981	
Kosmos 1250	Strela-1M	6 March 1981; 11:31	Kosmos-3M 11K65M	Communication	in orbit	Launched with Kosmos 1251-1257

* — satellite was destroyed in orbit rather than decaying and burning up in the Earth's atmosphere

== See also ==
- List of USA satellites
