= Kosmos 917 =

Soviet military early warning satellite

- Mission type: early warning
- COSPAR ID: 1977-047A
- SATCAT no.: 10059
- Mission duration: 4 years

Spacecraft properties
- Spacecraft type: US-K
- Launch mass: 1,900 kilograms (4,200 lb)

Start of mission
- Launch date: 16 June 1977, 01:58 UTC
- Rocket: Molniya-M/2BL
- Launch site: Plesetsk Cosmodrome

End of mission
- Deactivated: 30 March 1979
- Decay date: 4 January 2023

Orbital parameters
- Reference system: Geocentric
- Regime: Molniya
- Perigee altitude: 620 kilometres (390 mi)
- Apogee altitude: 39,725 kilometres (24,684 mi)
- Inclination: 62.9 degrees
- Period: 717.60 minutes

Kosmos 917 (Russian: Космос 917 meaning Cosmos 917) was a Soviet US-K missile early warning satellite which was launched in 1977 as part of the Soviet military's Oko programme. The satellite was designed to identify missile launches using optical telescopes and infrared sensors.

Kosmos 917 was launched from Site 43/4 at Plesetsk Cosmodrome in the Russian SSR. A Molniya-M carrier rocket with a 2BL upper stage was used to perform the launch, which took place at 04:44 UTC on 16 June 1977. The launch successfully placed the satellite into a molniya orbit. It subsequently received its Kosmos designation, and the international designator 1977-047A. The United States Space Command assigned it the Satellite Catalog Number 10059.

It self-destructed on 8 June 1978.

The primary portion of it re-entered on 4 January 2023, but several pieces of its debris still remain in orbit.

== See also ==
- List of Kosmos satellites (751–1000)
- List of R-7 launches (1975-1979)
- 1977 in spaceflight
- List of Oko satellites
