= List of R-7 launches (1975–1979) =

This is a list of launches made by the R-7 Semyorka ICBM, and its derivatives between 1975 and 1979. All launches are orbital satellite launches, unless stated otherwise.

Date and time (GMT)	Configuration	Serial number	Launch site	Result	Payload	Remarks
== 1975 ==
11 January 1975, 21:43	Soyuz (11A511)		LC-1/5, Baikonur	Successful	Soyuz 17	Crewed orbital flight, 2 cosmonauts Docked with Salyut 4
17 January 1975, 09:07	Voskhod (11A57)		LC-31/6, Baikonur	Successful	Kosmos 702 (Zenit-2M)	
23 January 1975, 11:00	Voskhod (11A57)		LC-41/1, Plesetsk	Successful	Kosmos 704 (Zenit-4MK)	
30 January 1975, 15:02	Molniya-M (8K78M)		LC-41/1, Plesetsk	Successful	Kosmos 706 (Oko)	
6 February 1975, 04:49	Molniya-M (8K78M)		LC-41/1, Plesetsk	Successful	Molniya 2-12	
12 February 1975, 14:30	Voskhod (11A57)		LC-41/1, Plesetsk	Successful	Kosmos 709 (Zenit-4MK)	
26 February 1975, 09:00	Voskhod (11A57)		LC-31/6, Baikonur	Successful	Kosmos 710 (Zenit-4MK)	
12 March 1975, 08:55	Voskhod (11A57)		LC-31/6, Baikonur	Successful	Kosmos 719 (Zenit-4MK)	
21 March 1975, 06:50	Soyuz-U (11A511U)		LC-43/3, Plesetsk	Successful	Kosmos 720 (Zenit-4MT)	
26 March 1975, 08:50	Voskhod (11A57)		LC-41/1, Plesetsk	Successful	Kosmos 721 (Zenit-2M)	
27 March 1975, 08:00	Voskhod (11A57)		LC-31/6, Baikonur	Successful	Kosmos 722 (Zenit-4MK)	
1 April 1975, 12:30	Vostok-2M (8A92M)		LC-41/1, Plesetsk	Successful	Meteor 1-21	
5 April 1975, 11:04	Soyuz (11A511)		LC-1/5, Baikonur	Failure	Soyuz 7K-T No.39	Crewed suborbital flight, 2 cosmonauts Blok A core stage failed to separate properly from the Blok I third stage. The crew used the Soyuz's propulsion system to escape as the LES was gone by this point in the launch.
14 April 1975, 17:53	Molniya-M (8K78M)		LC-41/1, Plesetsk	Successful	Molniya 3-12L	
16 April 1975, 08:00	Soyuz-U (11A511U)		LC-31/6, Baikonur	Successful	Kosmos 727 (Zenit-4MK)	
18 April 1975, 10:00	Voskhod (11A57)		LC-41/1, Plesetsk	Successful	Kosmos 728 (Zenit-2M)	
24 April 1975, 08:05	Voskhod (11A57)		LC-43/4, Plesetsk	Successful	Kosmos 730 (Zenit-4MK)	
29 April 1975, 10:24	Molniya-M (8K78M)		LC-41/1, Plesetsk	Successful	Molniya 1-29	
21 May 1975, 06:59	Voskhod (11A57)		LC-31/6, Baikonur	Successful	Kosmos 731 (Zenit-2M)	
24 May 1975, 14:58	Soyuz (11A511)		LC-1/5, Baikonur	Successful	Soyuz 18	Crewed orbital flight, 2 cosmonauts Docked with Salyut 4 Final flight of Soyuz 11A511
28 May 1975, 07:29	Voskhod (11A57)		LC-31/6, Baikonur	Successful	Kosmos 740 (Zenit-4MK)	
30 May 1975, 06:45	Voskhod (11A57)		LC-43/3, Plesetsk	Successful	Kosmos 741 (Zenit-2M)	
3 June 1975, 13:21	Voskhod (11A57)		LC-43/3, Plesetsk	Successful	Kosmos 742 (Zenit-4MK)	
5 June 1975, 01:38	Molniya-M (8K78M)		LC-41/1, Plesetsk	Successful	Molniya 1-30	
12 June 1975, 12:30	Soyuz-U (11A511U)		LC-43/3, Plesetsk	Successful	Kosmos 743 (Zenit-4MK)	
20 June 1975, 06:54	Vostok-2M (8A92M)		LC-41/1, Plesetsk	Successful	Kosmos 744 (Tselina-D)	
25 June 1975, 13:00	Voskhod (11A57)		LC-43/3, Plesetsk	Successful	Kosmos 746 (Zenit-4MK)	
27 June 1975, 13:00	Voskhod (11A57)		LC-41/1, Plesetsk	Successful	Kosmos 747 (Zenit-2M)	
3 July 1975, 13:40	Voskhod (11A57)		LC-41/1, Plesetsk	Successful	Kosmos 748 (Zenit-4MK)	
8 July 1975, 05:05	Molniya-M (8K78M)		LC-41/1, Plesetsk	Successful	Molniya 2-13	
11 July 1975, 04:15	Vostok-2M (8A92M)		LC-41/1, Plesetsk	Successful	Meteor 2-1	
15 July 1975, 12:20	Soyuz-U (11A511U)		LC-1/5, Baikonur	Successful	Soyuz 19	Crewed orbital flight, 2 cosmonauts Apollo-Soyuz Test Project
23 July 1975, 13:00	Voskhod (11A57)		LC-43/3, Plesetsk	Successful	Kosmos 751 (Zenit-2M)	
31 July 1975, 13:00	Voskhod (11A57)		LC-43/3, Plesetsk	Successful	Kosmos 753 (Zenit-4MK)	
13 August 1975, 07:21	Voskhod (11A57)		LC-31/6, Baikonur	Successful	Kosmos 754 (Zenit-4MK)	
22 August 1975, 02:11	Vostok-2M (8A92M)		LC-41/1, Plesetsk	Successful	Kosmos 756 (Tselina-D)	
27 August 1975, 14:45	Voskhod (11A57)		LC-41/1, Plesetsk	Successful	Kosmos 757 (Zenit-4MK)	
2 September 1975, 13:09	Molniya-M (8K78M)		LC-41/1, Plesetsk	Successful	Molniya 1-31	
5 September 1975, 14:50	Soyuz-U (11A511U)		LC-43/3, Plesetsk	Successful	Kosmos 758 (Yantar-2K)	
9 September 1975, 00:19	Molniya-M (8K78M)		LC-41/1, Plesetsk	Successful	Molniya 2-14	
12 September 1975, 05:30	Soyuz-U (11A511U)		LC-43/3, Plesetsk	Successful	Kosmos 759 (Zenit-4MT)	
16 September 1975, 09:00	Voskhod (11A57)		LC-31/6, Baikonur	Successful	Kosmos 760 (Zenit-4MK)	
18 September 1975, 00:12	Vostok-2M (8A92M)		LC-41/1, Plesetsk	Successful	Meteor 1-22	
23 September 1975, 10:00	Voskhod (11A57)		LC-41/1, Plesetsk	Successful	Kosmos 769 (Zenit-2M)	
25 September 1975, 09:50	Soyuz-U (11A511U)		LC-43/4, Plesetsk	Successful	Kosmos 771 (Zenit-4MKT)	
29 September 1975, 04:15	Soyuz-U (11A511U)		LC-1/5, Baikonur	Successful	Kosmos 772 (Soyuz-S)	Uncrewed test flight of the military version of the Soyuz spacecraft
1 October 1975, 08:30	Voskhod (11A57)		LC-31/6, Baikonur	Successful	Kosmos 774 (Zenit-4MK)	
17 October 1975, 14:30	Voskhod (11A57)		LC-41/1, Plesetsk	Successful	Kosmos 776 (Zenit-2M)	
4 November 1975, 15:20	Voskhod (11A57)		LC-43/3, Plesetsk	Successful	Kosmos 779 (Zenit-4MK)	
14 November 1975, 19:14	Molniya-M (8K78M)		LC-43/3, Plesetsk	Successful	Molniya 3-13L	
17 November 1975, 14:36	Soyuz-U (11A511U)		LC-1/5, Baikonur	Successful	Soyuz 20	Uncrewed long-duration test of Soyuz spacecraft Docked with Salyut 4
21 November 1975, 09:20	Voskhod (11A57)		LC-31/6, Baikonur	Successful	Kosmos 780 (Zenit-2M)	
25 November 1975, 17:00	Soyuz-U (11A511U)		LC-43/3, Plesetsk	Successful	Kosmos 782 (Bion)	
3 December 1975, 10:00	Voskhod (11A57)		LC-43/3, Plesetsk	Successful	Kosmos 784 (Zenit-2M)	
16 December 1975, 09:50	Voskhod (11A57)		LC-31/6, Baikonur	Successful	Kosmos 786 (Zenit-4MK)	
17 December 1975, 11:06	Molniya-M (8K78M)		LC-43/3, Plesetsk	Successful	Molniya 2-15	
22 December 1975, 02:08	Molniya-M (8K78M)		LC-31/6, Baikonur	Successful	Prognoz 4	
25 December 1975, 19:00	Vostok-2M (8A92M)		LC-41/1, Plesetsk	Successful	Meteor 1-23	
27 December 1975, 10:22	Molniya-M (8K78M)		LC-43/3, Plesetsk	Successful	Molniya 3-15L	
== 1976 ==
7 January 1976, 15:35	Voskhod (11A57)		LC-43/3, Plesetsk	Successful	Kosmos 788 (Zenit-4MK)	
22 January 1976, 11:38	Molniya-M (8K78M)		LC-1/5, Baikonur	Successful	Molniya 1-32	
29 January 1976, 08:30	Voskhod (11A57)		LC-31/6, Baikonur	Successful	Kosmos 799 (Zenit-2M)	
11 February 1976, 08:50	Voskhod (11A57)		LC-31/6, Baikonur	Successful	Kosmos 802 (Zenit-4MK)	
20 February 1976, 14:01	Soyuz-U (11A511U)		LC-43/3, Plesetsk	Successful	Kosmos 805 (Yantar-2K)	
10 March 1976, 08:00	Soyuz-U (11A511U)		LC-31/6, Baikonur	Successful	Kosmos 806 (Zenit-4MK)	
11 March 1976, 19:45	Molniya-M (8K78M)		LC-41/1, Plesetsk	Successful	Molniya 1-33	
16 March 1976, 17:22	Vostok-2M (8A92M)		LC-41/1, Plesetsk	Successful	Kosmos 808 (Tselina-D)	
18 March 1976, 09:15	Soyuz-U (11A511U)		LC-31/6, Baikonur	Successful	Kosmos 809 (Zenit-2M)	
19 March 1976, 19:31	Molniya-M (8K78M)		LC-1/5, Baikonur	Successful	Molniya 1-34	
26 March 1976, 15:00	Voskhod (11A57)		LC-43/3, Plesetsk	Successful	Kosmos 810 (Zenit-4MK)	
31 March 1976, 12:50	Soyuz-M (11A511M)		LC-41/1, Plesetsk	Successful	Kosmos 811 (Zenit-4MT)	Final flight of the Soyuz-M
7 April 1976, 13:05	Vostok-2M (8A92M)		LC-41/1, Plesetsk	Successful	Meteor 1-24	
9 April 1976, 08:30	Voskhod (11A57)		LC-43/3, Plesetsk	Successful	Kosmos 813 (Zenit-2M)	
28 April 1976, 09:30	Voskhod (11A57)		LC-43/3, Plesetsk	Successful	Kosmos 815 (Zenit-4MK)	
5 May 1976, 07:50	Voskhod (11A57)		LC-31/6, Baikonur	Successful	Kosmos 817 (Zenit-4MK)	
12 May 1976, 17:57	Molniya-M (8K78M)		LC-41/1, Plesetsk	Successful	Molniya 3-16L	
15 May 1976, 13:30	Vostok-2M (8A92M)		LC-43/3, Plesetsk	Successful	Meteor 1-25 (Meteor-Priroda 2)	
20 May 1976, 09:00	Voskhod (11A57)		LC-31/6, Baikonur	Successful	Kosmos 819 (Zenit-2M)	
21 May 1976, 07:00	Soyuz-U (11A511U)		LC-43/3, Plesetsk	Successful	Kosmos 820 (Zenit-4MKT)	
26 May 1976, 09:00	Voskhod (11A57)		LC-43/3, Plesetsk	Successful	Kosmos 821 (Zenit-4MK)	
8 June 1976, 07:00	Voskhod (11A57)		LC-31/6, Baikonur	Successful	Kosmos 824 (Zenit-4MK)	
16 June 1976, 13:10	Voskhod (11A57)		LC-43/3, Plesetsk	Successful	Kosmos 833 (Zenit-4MK)	
24 June 1976, 07:10	Soyuz-U (11A511U)		LC-43/3, Plesetsk	Successful	Kosmos 834 (Zenit-2M)	
29 June 1976, 07:20	Voskhod (11A57)		LC-31/6, Baikonur	Successful	Kosmos 835 (Zenit-4MK)	Final flight of the Voskhod rocket
1 July 1976, 08:06	Molniya-M (8K78M)		LC-43/4, Plesetsk	Partial Failure	Kosmos 837 (Molniya 2)	Blok L tumbled due to flight control system problem, leaving satellite in useless orbit
6 July 1976, 12:08	Soyuz (11A511)		LC-1/5, Baikonur	Successful	Soyuz 21	Crewed orbital flight, 2 cosmonauts Docked with Salyut 5
14 July 1976, 09:00	Soyuz-U (11A511U)		LC-43/4, Plesetsk	Successful	Kosmos 840 (Zenit-2M)	
22 July 1976, 15:40	Soyuz-U (11A511U)		LC-43/3, Plesetsk	Successful	Kosmos 844 (Yantar-2K)	
23 July 1976, 15:49	Molniya-M (8K78M)		LC-1/5, Baikonur	Successful	Molniya 1-35	
4 August 1976, 13:40	Soyuz-U (11A511U)		LC-43/4, Plesetsk	Successful	Kosmos 847 (Zenit-4MK)	
12 August 1976, 13:30	Soyuz-U (11A511U)		LC-43/3, Plesetsk	Successful	Kosmos 848 (Zenit-2M)	
27 August 1976, 14:35	Vostok-2M (8A92M)		LC-43/4, Plesetsk	Successful	Kosmos 851 (Tselina-D)	
28 August 1976, 09:00	Soyuz-U (11A511U)		LC-31/6, Baikonur	Successful	Kosmos 852 (Zenit-4MK)	
1 September 1976, 03:23	Molniya-M (8K78M)		LC-43/3, Plesetsk	Partial Failure	Kosmos 853 (Molniya 2)	Blok L failed to start due to stuck LOX valve
3 September 1976, 09:20	Soyuz-U (11A511U)		LC-43/4, Plesetsk	Successful	Kosmos 854 (Zenit-4MK)	
15 September 1976, 09:48	Soyuz-U (11A511U)		LC-1/5, Baikonur	Successful	Soyuz 22	Crewed orbital flight, 2 cosmonauts
21 September 1976, 11:40	Soyuz-U (11A511U)		LC-43/3, Plesetsk	Successful	Kosmos 855 (Zenit-4MT)	
22 September 1976, 09:30	Soyuz-U (11A511U)		LC-31/6, Baikonur	Successful	Kosmos 856 (Zenit-2M)	
24 September 1976, 15:00	Soyuz-U (11A511U)		LC-43/3, Plesetsk	Successful	Kosmos 857 (Zenit-4MK)	
4 October 1976, 11:00	Soyuz-U (11A511U)		LC-43/4, Plesetsk	Failure	Zenit-4MKT	Blok D strap-on broke off the stack at T+24 seconds due to a failure of the strut holding it to the core stage. Automatic shutdown command issued T+94 seconds.
10 October 1976, 09:35	Soyuz-U (11A511U)		LC-31/6, Baikonur	Successful	Kosmos 859 (Zenit-4MK)	
14 October 1976, 17:39	Soyuz (11A511)		LC-1/5, Baikonur	Successful	Soyuz 23	Crewed orbital flight, 2 cosmonauts Failed to dock with Salyut 5
15 October 1976, 22:59	Vostok-2M (8A92M)		LC-43/3, Plesetsk	Successful	Meteor 1-26	
22 October 1976, 09:12	Molniya-M (8K78M)		LC-43/4, Plesetsk	Successful	Kosmos 862 (Oko)	
25 October 1976, 14:30	Soyuz-U (11A511U)		LC-43/4, Plesetsk	Successful	Kosmos 863 (Zenit-4MK)	
1 November 1976, 11:20	Soyuz-U (11A511U)		LC-43/4, Plesetsk	Successful	Kosmos 865 (Zenit-2M)	
11 November 1976, 10:45	Soyuz-U (11A511U)		LC-31/6, Baikonur	Successful	Kosmos 866 (Zenit-4MK)	
23 November 1976, 16:27	Soyuz-U (11A511U)		LC-43/4, Plesetsk	Successful	Kosmos 867 (Zenit-6)	
25 November 1976, 03:59	Molniya-M (8K78M)		LC-31/6, Baikonur	Successful	Prognoz 5	
29 November 1976, 16:00	Soyuz-U (11A511U)		LC-1/5, Baikonur	Successful	Kosmos 869 (Soyuz-S)	Uncrewed test flight of the military version of the Soyuz spacecraft
2 December 1976, 02:45	Molniya-M (8K78M)		LC-43/4, Plesetsk	Successful	Molniya 2-16	
9 December 1976, 10:00	Soyuz-U (11A511U)		LC-43/4, Plesetsk	Successful	Kosmos 879 (Zenit-2M)	
17 December 1976, 09:30	Soyuz-U (11A511U)		LC-31/6, Baikonur	Successful	Kosmos 884 (Zenit-4MK)	
28 December 1976, 06:38	Molniya-M (8K78M)		LC-43/4, Plesetsk	Successful	Molniya 3-17L	
== 1977 ==
6 January 1977, 09:40	Soyuz-U (11A511U)		LC-31/6, Baikonur	Successful	Kosmos 888 (Zenit-4MK)	
6 January 1977, 23:17	Vostok-2M (8A92M)		LC-43/3, Plesetsk	Successful	Meteor 2-2	
20 January 1977, 08:30	Soyuz-U (11A511U)		LC-31/6, Baikonur	Successful	Kosmos 889 (Zenit-2M)	
7 February 1977, 16:11	Soyuz-U (11A511U)		LC-1/5, Baikonur	Successful	Soyuz 24	Crewed orbital flight, 2 cosmonauts Docked with Salyut 5
9 February 1977, 11:30	Soyuz-U (11A511U)		LC-43/3, Plesetsk	Successful	Kosmos 892 (Zenit-4MK)	
11 February 1977, 14:57	Molniya-M (8K78M)		LC-43/4, Plesetsk	Successful	Molniya 2-17	
22 February 1977, 09:19	Soyuz-U (11A511U)		LC-31/6, Baikonur	Failure	Zenit-4MK	Accidental shutdown command issued at T+103 seconds due to damaged heat shield. Launcher crashed downrange.
26 February 1977, 21:18	Vostok-2M (8A92M)		LC-43/4, Plesetsk	Successful	Kosmos 895 (Tselina-D)	
3 March 1977, 10:30	Soyuz-U (11A511U)		LC-43/3, Plesetsk	Successful	Kosmos 896 (Zenit-6)	
10 March 1977, 11:00	Soyuz-U (11A511U)		LC-43/3, Plesetsk	Successful	Kosmos 897 (Zenit-4MK)	
17 March 1977, 08:30	Soyuz-U (11A511U)		LC-43/3, Plesetsk	Successful	Kosmos 898 (Zenit-2M)	
24 March 1977, 11:51	Molniya-M (8K78M)		LC-43/4, Plesetsk	Successful	Molniya 1-36	
5 April 1977, 02:05	Vostok-2M (8A92M)		LC-43/3, Plesetsk	Successful	Meteor 1-27	
7 April 1977, 08:59	Soyuz-U (11A511U)		LC-43/4, Plesetsk	Successful	Kosmos 902 (Zenit-4MK)	
11 April 1977, 01:38	Molniya-M (8K78M)		LC-43/3, Plesetsk	Successful	Kosmos 903 (Oko)	
20 April 1977, 09:00	Soyuz-U (11A511U)		LC-31/6, Baikonur	Successful	Kosmos 904 (Zenit-2M)	
26 April 1977, 14:45	Soyuz-U (11A511U)		LC-43/3, Plesetsk	Successful	Kosmos 905 (Yantar-2K)	
28 April 1977, 09:10	Molniya-M (8K78M)		LC-43/4, Plesetsk	Successful	Molniya 3-19L	
5 May 1977, 14:00	Soyuz-U (11A511U)		LC-43/3, Plesetsk	Successful	Kosmos 907 (Zenit-4MK)	
17 May 1977, 10:10	Soyuz-U (11A511U)		LC-31/6, Baikonur	Successful	Kosmos 908 (Zenit-4MK)	
26 May 1977, 07:00	Soyuz-U (11A511U)		LC-43/4, Plesetsk	Successful	Kosmos 912 (Zenit-4MKT)	
31 May 1977, 07:30	Soyuz-U (11A511U)		LC-31/6, Baikonur	Successful	Kosmos 914 (Zenit-2M)	
8 June 1977, 14:00	Soyuz-U (11A511U)		LC-43/4, Plesetsk	Successful	Kosmos 915 (Zenit-4MK)	
10 June 1977, 08:00	Soyuz-U (11A511U)		LC-43/3, Plesetsk	Successful	Kosmos 916 (Zenit-4MT)	
16 June 1977, 01:58	Molniya-M (8K78M)		LC-43/4, Plesetsk	Successful	Kosmos 917 (Oko)	
22 June 1977, 08:00	Soyuz-U (11A511U)		LC-31/6, Baikonur	Successful	Kosmos 920 (Zenit-4MK)	
24 June 1977, 05:41	Molniya-M (8K78M)		LC-1/5, Baikonur	Successful	Molniya 1-37	
29 June 1977, 18:34	Vostok-2M (8A92M)		LC-31/6, Baikonur	Successful	Meteor 1-28 (Meteor-Priroda 3)	
30 June 1977, 14:00	Soyuz-U (11A511U)		LC-43/4, Plesetsk	Successful	Kosmos 922 (Zenit-2M)	
7 July 1977, 07:25	Vostok-2M (8A92M)		LC-43/4, Plesetsk	Successful	Kosmos 925 (Tselina-D)	
12 July 1977, 09:00	Soyuz-U (11A511U)		LC-43/4, Plesetsk	Successful	Kosmos 927 (Zenit-4MKM)	
20 July 1977, 04:44	Molniya-M (8K78M)		LC-43/4, Plesetsk	Successful	Kosmos 931 (Oko)	
20 July 1977, 07:35	Soyuz-U (11A511U)		LC-31/6, Baikonur	Successful	Kosmos 932 (Zenit-4MKM)	
27 July 1977, 18:07	Soyuz-U (11A511U)		LC-43/4, Plesetsk	Successful	Kosmos 934 (Zenit-6)	
29 July 1977, 08:00	Soyuz-U (11A511U)		LC-43/4, Plesetsk	Successful	Kosmos 935 (Zenit-2M)	
3 August 1977, 14:01	Soyuz-U (11A511U)		LC-43/3, Plesetsk	Successful	Kosmos 936 (Bion)	
10 August 1977, 10:40	Soyuz-U (11A511U)		LC-31/6, Baikonur	Failure	Zenit-4MKM	Hydrogen peroxide leak results in a fire in the Blok V strap-on. Blok V broke off the stack at T+53 seconds, followed by an automatic shutoff command being issued to the booster.
24 August 1977, 14:30	Soyuz-U (11A511U)		LC-43/4, Plesetsk	Successful	Kosmos 938 (Zenit-4MKM)	
27 August 1977, 10:09	Soyuz-U (11A511U)		LC-43/3, Plesetsk	Successful	Kosmos 947 (Zenit-2M)	
30 August 1977, 18:06	Molniya-M (8K78M)		LC-43/3, Plesetsk	Successful	Molniya 1-38	
2 September 1977, 09:00	Soyuz-U (11A511U)		LC-43/4, Plesetsk	Successful	Kosmos 948 (Zenit-4MKT)	
6 September 1977, 17:30	Soyuz-U (11A511U)		LC-43/3, Plesetsk	Successful	Kosmos 949 (Yantar-2K)	
13 September 1977, 15:10	Soyuz-U (11A511U)		LC-43/3, Plesetsk	Successful	Kosmos 950 (Zenit-2M)	
16 September 1977, 14:30	Soyuz-U (11A511U)		LC-43/3, Plesetsk	Successful	Kosmos 953 (Zenit-4MKM)	
20 September 1977, 01:01	Vostok-2M (8A92M)		LC-43/4, Plesetsk	Successful	Kosmos 955 (Tselina-D)	
22 September 1977, 00:51	Molniya-M (8K78M)		LC-31/6, Baikonur	Successful	Prognoz 6	
30 September 1977, 09:46	Soyuz-U (11A511U)		LC-31/6, Baikonur	Successful	Kosmos 957 (Zenit-4MKM)	
9 October 1977, 02:40	Soyuz-U (11A511U)		LC-1/5, Baikonur	Successful	Soyuz 25	Crewed orbital flight, 2 cosmonauts Failed to dock with Salyut 6
11 October 1977, 15:14	Soyuz-U (11A511U)		LC-43/4, Plesetsk	Successful	Kosmos 958 (Zenit-6)	
28 October 1977, 01:37	Molniya-M (8K78M)		LC-43/3, Plesetsk	Successful	Molniya 3-18L	
4 December 1977, 12:00	Soyuz-U (11A511U)		LC-43/4, Plesetsk	Successful	Kosmos 964 (Zenit-4MKM)	
10 December 1977, 01:18	Soyuz-U (11A511U)		LC-1/5, Baikonur	Successful	Soyuz 26	Crewed orbital flight, 2 cosmonauts Docked with Salyut 6
12 December 1977, 09:40	Soyuz-U (11A511U)		LC-31/6, Baikonur	Successful	Kosmos 966 (Zenit-2M)	
14 December 1977, 09:30	Vostok-2M (8A92M)		LC-43/4, Plesetsk	Successful	Meteor 2-3	
20 December 1977, 15:50	Soyuz-U (11A511U)		LC-43/4, Plesetsk	Successful	Kosmos 969 (Zenit-4MKM)	
27 December 1977, 09:20	Soyuz-U (11A511U)		LC-31/6, Baikonur	Successful	Kosmos 973 (Zenit-2M)	
== 1978 ==
6 January 1978, 15:50	Soyuz-U (11A511U)		LC-43/3, Plesetsk	Successful	Kosmos 974 (Zenit-4MKM)	
10 January 1978, 12:26	Soyuz-U (11A511U)		LC-1/5, Baikonur	Successful	Soyuz 27	Crewed orbital flight, 2 cosmonauts Docked with Salyut 6
10 January 1978, 13:23	Vostok-2M (8A92M)		LC-43/4, Plesetsk	Successful	Kosmos 975 (Tselina-D)	
13 January 1978, 15:15	Soyuz-U (11A511U)		LC-43/3, Plesetsk	Successful	Kosmos 984 (Zenit-2M)	
20 January 1978, 08:25	Soyuz-U (11A511U)		LC-31/6, Baikonur	Successful	Progress 1	Salyut 6 Logistics
24 January 1978, 06:51	Molniya-M (8K78M)		LC-43/3, Plesetsk	Successful	Molniya 3-20L	
24 January 1978, 09:50	Soyuz-U (11A511U)		LC-31/6, Baikonur	Successful	Kosmos 986 (Zenit-4MKM)	
31 January 1978, 14:50	Soyuz-U (11A511U)		LC-43/4, Plesetsk	Successful	Kosmos 987 (Zenit-4MKM)	
8 February 1978, 12:15	Soyuz-U (11A511U)		LC-43/3, Plesetsk	Successful	Kosmos 988 (Zenit-4MT)	
14 February 1978, 09:30	Soyuz-U (11A511U)		LC-31/6, Baikonur	Successful	Kosmos 989 (Zenit-4MKM)	
2 March 1978, 15:28	Soyuz-U (11A511U)		LC-1/5, Baikonur	Successful	Soyuz 28	Crewed orbital flight, 2 cosmonauts Docked with Salyut 6
2 March 1978, 22:07	Molniya-M (8K78M)		LC-41/1, Plesetsk	Successful	Molniya 1-39	
4 March 1978, 07:40	Soyuz-U (11A511U)		LC-31/6, Baikonur	Successful	Kosmos 992 (Zenit-2M)	
10 March 1978, 10:42	Soyuz-U (11A511U)		LC-43/3, Plesetsk	Successful	Kosmos 993 (Zenit-4MKM)	
17 March 1978, 10:50	Soyuz-U (11A511U)		LC-43/3, Plesetsk	Successful	Kosmos 995 (Zenit-2M)	
30 March 1978, 07:50	Soyuz-U (11A511U)		LC-31/6, Baikonur	Successful	Kosmos 999 (Zenit-4MKM)	
4 April 1978, 15:00	Soyuz-U (11A511U)		LC-1/5, Baikonur	Successful	Kosmos 1001 (Soyuz-T)	Uncrewed test flight of the new version of the Soyuz spacecraft
6 April 1978, 09:10	Soyuz-U (11A511U)		LC-31/6, Baikonur	Successful	Kosmos 1002 (Zenit-2M)	
20 April 1978, 15:30	Soyuz-U (11A511U)		LC-43/4, Plesetsk	Successful	Kosmos 1003 (Zenit-4MKM)	
5 May 1978, 15:30	Soyuz-U (11A511U)		LC-43/3, Plesetsk	Successful	Kosmos 1004 (Zenit-2M)	
12 May 1978, 04:07	Vostok-2M (8A92M)		LC-43/4, Plesetsk	Successful	Kosmos 1005 (Tselina-D)	
16 May 1978, 10:40	Soyuz-U (11A511U)		LC-43/3, Plesetsk	Successful	Kosmos 1007 (Zenit-4MKM)	
23 May 1978, 07:30	Soyuz-U (11A511U)		LC-43/4, Plesetsk	Successful	Kosmos 1010 (Zenit-4MKT)	
25 May 1978, 14:30	Soyuz-U (11A511U)		LC-43/3, Plesetsk	Successful	Kosmos 1012 (Zenit-2M)	
2 June 1978, 12:12	Molniya-M (8K78M)		LC-43/3, Plesetsk	Successful	Molniya 1-40	
10 June 1978, 08:35	Soyuz-U (11A511U)		LC-31/6, Baikonur	Successful	Kosmos 1021 (Zenit-4MKM)	
12 June 1978, 10:30	Soyuz-U (11A511U)		LC-43/3, Plesetsk	Successful	Kosmos 1022 (Zenit-4MKM)	
15 June 1978, 20:16	Soyuz-U (11A511U)		LC-1/5, Baikonur	Successful	Soyuz 29	Crewed orbital flight, 2 cosmonauts Docked with Salyut 6
27 June 1978, 15:27	Soyuz-U (11A511U)		LC-1/5, Baikonur	Successful	Soyuz 30	Crewed orbital flight, 2 cosmonauts Docked with Salyut 6
28 June 1978, 02:59	Molniya-M (8K78M)		LC-43/3, Plesetsk	Successful	Kosmos 1024 (Oko)	
2 July 1978, 09:30	Soyuz-U (11A511U)		LC-31/6, Baikonur	Successful	Kosmos 1026 (Energiya)	
7 July 1978, 11:26	Soyuz-U (11A511U)		LC-31/6, Baikonur	Successful	Progress 2	Salyut 6 Logistics
14 July 1978, 15:00	Molniya-M (8K78M)		LC-43/4, Plesetsk	Successful	Molniya 1-41	
5 August 1978, 15:00	Soyuz-U (11A511U)		LC-43/3, Plesetsk	Successful	Kosmos 1028 (Yantar-2K)	
7 August 1978, 22:31	Soyuz-U (11A511U)		LC-31/6, Baikonur	Successful	Progress 3	Salyut 6 Logistics
22 August 1978, 23:47	Molniya-M (8K78M)		LC-43/4, Plesetsk	Successful	Molniya 1-42	
26 August 1978, 14:51	Soyuz-U (11A511U)		LC-1/5, Baikonur	Successful	Soyuz 31	Crewed orbital flight, 2 cosmonauts Docked with Salyut 6
29 August 1978, 15:00	Soyuz-U (11A511U)		LC-43/4, Plesetsk	Successful	Kosmos 1029 (Zenit-4MKM)	
6 September 1978, 03:04	Molniya-M (8K78M)		LC-43/4, Plesetsk	Successful	Kosmos 1030 (Oko)	
9 September 1978, 15:00	Soyuz-U (11A511U)		LC-41/1, Plesetsk	Successful	Kosmos 1031 (Zenit-4MKM)	
19 September 1978, 08:05	Soyuz-U (11A511U)		LC-43/3, Plesetsk	Successful	Kosmos 1032 (Zenit-2M)	
3 October 1978, 11:00	Soyuz-U (11A511U)		LC-43/3, Plesetsk	Successful	Kosmos 1033 (Zenit-4MKT)	
4 October 1978, 23:09	Soyuz-U (11A511U)		LC-1/5, Baikonur	Successful	Progress 4	Salyut 6 Logistics
6 October 1978, 15:30	Soyuz-U (11A511U)		LC-43/3, Plesetsk	Successful	Kosmos 1042 (Zenit-4MKM)	
10 October 1978, 19:44	Vostok-2M (8A92M)		LC-43/4, Plesetsk	Successful	Kosmos 1043 (Tselina-D)	
13 October 1978, 05:19	Molniya-M (8K78M)		LC-43/3, Plesetsk	Successful	Molniya 3-22L	
17 October 1978, 15:00	Soyuz-U (11A511U)		LC-43/4, Plesetsk	Successful	Kosmos 1044 (Zenit-2M)	
30 October 1978, 05:23	Molniya-M (8K78M)		LC-31/6, Baikonur	Successful	Prognoz 7	
1 November 1978, 12:00	Soyuz-U (11A511U)		LC-41/1, Plesetsk	Successful	Kosmos 1046 (Zenit-4MT)	
15 November 1978, 11:45	Soyuz-U (11A511U)		LC-41/1, Plesetsk	Successful	Kosmos 1047 (Zenit-4MKM)	
21 November 1978, 12:00	Soyuz-U (11A511U)		LC-43/4, Plesetsk	Successful	Kosmos 1049 (Zenit-4MKM)	
28 November 1978, 16:20	Soyuz-U (11A511U)		LC-43/4, Plesetsk	Successful	Kosmos 1050 (Zenit-6)	
7 December 1978, 15:30	Soyuz-U (11A511U)		LC-41/1, Plesetsk	Successful	Kosmos 1059 (Zenit-4MKM)	
8 December 1978, 09:30	Soyuz-U (11A511U)		LC-31/6, Baikonur	Successful	Kosmos 1060 (Zenit-2M)	
14 December 1978, 15:20	Soyuz-U (11A511U)		LC-43/4, Plesetsk	Successful	Kosmos 1061 (Zenit-2M)	
19 December 1978, 01:35	Vostok-2M (8A92M)		LC-43/4, Plesetsk	Successful	Kosmos 1063 (Tselina-D)	
23 December 1978, 08:39	Vostok-2M (8A92M)		LC-43/3, Plesetsk	Successful	Kosmos 1066 (Astrofizika)	
26 December 1978, 15:30	Soyuz-U (11A511U)		LC-43/4, Plesetsk	Successful	Kosmos 1068 (Zenit-4MKM)	
28 December 1978, 16:30	Soyuz-U (11A511U)		LC-41/1, Plesetsk	Successful	Kosmos 1069 (Zenit-4MT)	
== 1979 ==
11 January 1979, 15:00	Soyuz-U (11A511U)		LC-43/3, Plesetsk	Successful	Kosmos 1070 (Zenit-2M)	
13 January 1979, 15:30	Soyuz-U (11A511U)		LC-43/4, Plesetsk	Successful	Kosmos 1071 (Zenit-4MKM)	
18 January 1979, 15:42	Molniya-M (8K78M)		LC-43/3, Plesetsk	Successful	Molniya 3-23L	
25 January 1979, 05:43	Vostok-2M (8A92M)		LC-31/6, Baikonur	Successful	Meteor 1-29 (Meteor-Priroda 4)	
30 January 1979, 15:15	Soyuz-U (11A511U)		LC-43/4, Plesetsk	Successful	Kosmos 1073 (Zenit-4MKM)	
31 January 1979, 09:00	Soyuz-U (11A511U)		LC-31/6, Baikonur	Successful	Kosmos 1074 (Soyuz-T)	Uncrewed test flight of the new version of the Soyuz spacecraft
13 February 1979, 21:41	Vostok-2M (8A92M)		LC-43/4, Plesetsk	Successful	Kosmos 1077 (Tselina-D)	
16 February 1979, 15:00	Soyuz-U (11A511U)		LC-41/1, Plesetsk	Failure	Zenit-2M	Electrical malfunction prevented the Blok I engines from igniting.
22 February 1979, 12:10	Soyuz-U (11A511U)		LC-41/1, Plesetsk	Successful	Kosmos 1078 (Zenit-4MKM)	
25 February 1979, 11:53	Soyuz-U (11A511U)		LC-31/6, Baikonur	Successful	Soyuz 32	Crewed orbital flight, 2 cosmonauts Docked with Salyut 6
27 February 1979, 15:00	Soyuz-U (11A511U)		LC-43/3, Plesetsk	Successful	Kosmos 1079 (Yantar-2K)	
1 March 1979, 18:45	Vostok-2M (8A92M)		LC-43/4, Plesetsk	Successful	Meteor 2-4	
12 March 1979, 05:47	Soyuz-U (11A511U)		LC-31/6, Baikonur	Successful	Progress 5	Salyut 6 Logistics
14 March 1979, 10:50	Soyuz-U (11A511U)		LC-41/1, Plesetsk	Successful	Kosmos 1080 (Zenit-4MKM)	
31 March 1979, 10:45	Soyuz-U (11A511U)		LC-41/1, Plesetsk	Successful	Kosmos 1090 (Zenit-2M)	
10 April 1979, 17:34	Soyuz-U (11A511U)		LC-31/6, Baikonur	Successful	Soyuz 33	Crewed orbital flight, 2 cosmonauts Failed to dock with Salyut 6
12 April 1979, 00:28	Molniya-M (8K78M)		LC-41/1, Plesetsk	Successful	Molniya 1-43	
14 April 1979, 05:27	Vostok-2M (8A92M)		LC-43/4, Plesetsk	Successful	Kosmos 1093 (Tselina-D)	
20 April 1979, 11:30	Soyuz-U (11A511U)		LC-43/3, Plesetsk	Successful	Kosmos 1095 (Zenit-6)	
27 April 1979, 17:15	Soyuz-U (11A511U)		LC-43/3, Plesetsk	Successful	Kosmos 1097 (Yantar-4K1)	
13 May 1979, 04:17	Soyuz-U (11A511U)		LC-31/6, Baikonur	Successful	Progress 6	Salyut 6 Logistics
15 May 1979, 11:40	Soyuz-U (11A511U)		LC-41/1, Plesetsk	Successful	Kosmos 1098 (Zenit-4MKM)	
17 May 1979, 07:10	Soyuz-U (11A511U)		LC-43/4, Plesetsk	Successful	Kosmos 1099 (Zenit-4MKT)	
25 May 1979, 07:00	Soyuz-U (11A511U)		LC-41/1, Plesetsk	Successful	Kosmos 1102 (Zenit-2M)	
31 May 1979, 16:30	Soyuz-U (11A511U)		LC-43/3, Plesetsk	Successful	Kosmos 1103 (Zenit-6)	
5 June 1979, 23:28	Molniya-M (8K78M)		LC-43/4, Plesetsk	Successful	Molniya 3-21L	
6 June 1979, 18:12	Soyuz-U (11A511U)		LC-31/6, Baikonur	Successful	Soyuz 34	Uncrewed flight to replace Soyuz 32 at Salyut 6, returned to Earth crewed with 2 cosmonauts
8 June 1979, 07:10	Soyuz-U (11A511U)		LC-41/1, Plesetsk	Successful	Kosmos 1105 (Zenit-4MKT)	
12 June 1979, 07:00	Soyuz-U (11A511U)		LC-43/4, Plesetsk	Successful	Kosmos 1106 (Zenit-2M)	
15 June 1979, 10:50	Soyuz-U (11A511U)		LC-43/3, Plesetsk	Successful	Kosmos 1107 (Zenit-6)	
22 June 1979, 07:00	Soyuz-U (11A511U)		LC-43/4, Plesetsk	Successful	Kosmos 1108 (Zenit-4MKT)	
27 June 1979, 18:11	Molniya-M (8K78M)		LC-41/1, Plesetsk	Successful	Kosmos 1109 (Oko)	
28 June 1979, 09:25	Soyuz-U (11A511U)		LC-31/6, Baikonur	Successful	Progress 7	Salyut 6 Logistics
29 June 1979, 16:00	Soyuz-U (11A511U)		LC-43/3, Plesetsk	Successful	Kosmos 1111 (Zenit-6)	
10 July 1979, 09:00	Soyuz-U (11A511U)		LC-31/6, Baikonur	Successful	Kosmos 1113 (Zenit-4MKM)	
13 July 1979, 08:25	Soyuz-U (11A511U)		LC-43/4, Plesetsk	Successful	Kosmos 1115 (Zenit-4MKT)	
20 July 1979, 11:58	Vostok-2M (8A92M)		LC-43/4, Plesetsk	Successful	Kosmos 1116 (Tselina-D)	
25 July 1979, 15:20	Soyuz-U (11A511U)		LC-43/3, Plesetsk	Successful	Kosmos 1117 (Zenit-4MKM)	
31 July 1979, 03:56	Molniya-M (8K78M)		LC-43/3, Plesetsk	Successful	Molniya 1-44	
3 August 1979, 10:45	Soyuz-U (11A511U)		LC-43/3, Plesetsk	Successful	Kosmos 1119 (Zenit-4MT)	
11 August 1979, 09:15	Soyuz-U (11A511U)		LC-31/6, Baikonur	Successful	Kosmos 1120 (Zenit-4MKM)	
14 August 1979, 15:30	Soyuz-U (11A511U)		LC-43/3, Plesetsk	Successful	Kosmos 1121 (Yantar-2K)	
17 August 1979, 07:45	Soyuz-U (11A511U)		LC-43/4, Plesetsk	Successful	Kosmos 1122 (Zenit-2M)	
21 August 1979, 11:10	Soyuz-U (11A511U)		LC-41/1, Plesetsk	Successful	Kosmos 1123 (Zenit-4MKT)	
28 August 1979, 00:17	Molniya-M (8K78M)		LC-43/4, Plesetsk	Successful	Kosmos 1124 (Oko)	
31 August 1979, 11:30	Soyuz-U (11A511U)		LC-43/4, Plesetsk	Successful	Kosmos 1126 (Zenit-6)	
5 September 1979, 10:20	Soyuz-U (11A511U)		LC-41/1, Plesetsk	Successful	Kosmos 1127 (Resurs-F1)	
14 September 1979, 15:30	Soyuz-U (11A511U)		LC-43/4, Plesetsk	Successful	Kosmos 1128 (Zenit-4MKM)	
25 September 1979, 15:30	Soyuz-U (11A511U)		LC-41/1, Plesetsk	Successful	Kosmos 1129 (Bion)	
28 September 1979, 12:20	Soyuz-U (11A511U)		LC-43/3, Plesetsk	Successful	Kosmos 1138 (Zenit-6)	
5 October 1979, 11:30	Soyuz-U (11A511U)		LC-41/1, Plesetsk	Successful	Kosmos 1139 (Zenit-4MT)	
12 October 1979, 12:30	Soyuz-U (11A511U)		LC-43/3, Plesetsk	Failure	Zenit-6	Blok I stage lost thrust due to LOX tank pressurization failure.
20 October 1979, 07:03	Molniya-M (8K78M)		LC-41/1, Plesetsk	Successful	Molniya 1-45	
22 October 1979, 12:30	Soyuz-U (11A511U)		LC-43/3, Plesetsk	Successful	Kosmos 1142 (Zenit-6)	
26 October 1979, 18:12	Vostok-2M (8A92M)		LC-43/4, Plesetsk	Successful	Kosmos 1143 (Tselina-D)	
31 October 1979, 09:25	Vostok-2M (8A92M)		LC-43/4, Plesetsk	Successful	Meteor 2-5	
2 November 1979, 16:00	Soyuz-U (11A511U)		LC-43/3, Plesetsk	Successful	Kosmos 1144 (Yantar-2K)	
27 November 1979, 09:55	Vostok-2M (8A92M)		LC-43/4, Plesetsk	Successful	Kosmos 1145 (Tselina-D)	
12 December 1979, 12:30	Soyuz-U (11A511U)		LC-43/3, Plesetsk	Successful	Kosmos 1147 (Zenit-6)	
16 December 1979, 12:29	Soyuz-U (11A511U)		LC-31/6, Baikonur	Successful	Soyuz T-1	Uncrewed test of modernised Soyuz-T spacecraft Docked with Salyut 6
28 December 1979, 13:00	Soyuz-U (11A511U)		LC-43/3, Plesetsk	Successful	Kosmos 1148 (Zenit-4MKM)	
