= Kosmos 903 =

Soviet military early warning satellite

- Mission type: Early warning
- COSPAR ID: 1977-027A
- SATCAT no.: 9911
- Mission duration: 4 years

Spacecraft properties
- Spacecraft type: US-K
- Launch mass: 1,900 kilograms (4,200 lb)

Start of mission
- Launch date: 11 April 1977, 01:38 UTC
- Rocket: Molniya-M/2BL
- Launch site: Plesetsk Cosmodrome

End of mission
- Deactivated: 8 June 1978

Orbital parameters
- Reference system: Geocentric
- Regime: Molniya
- Perigee altitude: 645 kilometres (401 mi)
- Apogee altitude: 39,720 kilometres (24,680 mi)
- Inclination: 62.8 degrees
- Period: 718.00 minutes

Kosmos 903 (Russian: Космос 903 meaning Cosmos 903) was a Soviet US-K missile early warning satellite which was launched in 1977 as part of the Soviet military's Oko programme. The satellite was designed to identify missile launches using optical telescopes and infrared sensors.

Kosmos 903 was launched from Site 43/3 at Plesetsk Cosmodrome in the Russian SSR. A Molniya-M carrier rocket with a 2BL upper stage was used to perform the launch, which took place at 01:38 UTC on 11 April 1977. The launch successfully placed the satellite into a molniya orbit. It subsequently received its Kosmos designation, and the international designator 1977-027A. The United States Space Command assigned it the Satellite Catalog Number 9911.

It was reported in History and the Current Status of the Russian Early-Warning System, that it self-destructed.

The primary portion of it re-entered on August 4, 2014, but several pieces of its debris still remain in orbit.

== See also ==
- List of Kosmos satellites (751–1000)
- List of R-7 launches (1975–1979)
- 1977 in spaceflight
- List of Oko satellites
