= Kosmos 931 =

Soviet military early warning satellite

- Mission type: Early warning
- COSPAR ID: 1977-068A
- SATCAT no.: 10150
- Mission duration: 4 years

Spacecraft properties
- Spacecraft type: US-K
- Launch mass: 1,900 kilograms (4,200 lb)

Start of mission
- Launch date: 20 July 1977, 04:44 UTC
- Rocket: Molniya-M/2BL
- Launch site: Plesetsk Cosmodrome

End of mission
- Deactivated: 24 October 1977

Orbital parameters
- Reference system: Geocentric
- Regime: Molniya
- Perigee altitude: 637 kilometres (396 mi)
- Apogee altitude: 39,718 kilometres (24,680 mi)
- Inclination: 62.8 degrees
- Period: 717.80 minutes

Kosmos 931 (Russian: Космос 931 meaning Cosmos 931) was a Soviet US-K missile early warning satellite which was launched in 1977 as part of the Soviet military's Oko programme. The satellite was designed to identify missile launches using optical telescopes and infrared sensors.

Kosmos 931 was launched from Site 43/3 at Plesetsk Cosmodrome in the Russian SSR. A Molniya-M carrier rocket with a 2BL upper stage was used to perform the launch, which took place at 04:44 UTC on 20 July 1977. The launch successfully placed the satellite into a molniya orbit. It subsequently received its Kosmos designation, and the international designator 1977-068A. The United States Space Command assigned it the Satellite Catalog Number 10150.

It self-destructed on 24 October 1977 and never reached the correct orbit.

== See also ==
- List of Kosmos satellites (751–1000)
- List of R-7 launches (1975-1979)
- 1977 in spaceflight
- List of Oko satellites
