= Kosmos 1024 =

Soviet military early warning satellite

- Mission type: Early warning
- COSPAR ID: 1978-066A
- SATCAT no.: 10970
- Mission duration: 4 years

Spacecraft properties
- Spacecraft type: US-K
- Launch mass: 1,900 kilograms (4,200 lb)

Start of mission
- Launch date: 28 June 1978, 02:59 UTC
- Rocket: Molniya-M/2BL
- Launch site: Plesetsk Cosmodrome

End of mission
- Deactivated: 24 May 1980

Orbital parameters
- Reference system: Geocentric
- Regime: Molniya
- Perigee altitude: 181.8 kilometres (113.0 mi)
- Apogee altitude: 39,081 kilometres (24,284 mi)
- Inclination: 62 degrees
- Period: 695.5 minutes

Kosmos 1024 (Russian: Космос 1024 meaning Cosmos 1024) was a Soviet US-K missile early warning satellite which was launched in 1978 as part of the Soviet military's Oko programme. The satellite was designed to identify missile launches using optical telescopes and infrared sensors.

Kosmos 1024 was launched from Site 43/3 at Plesetsk Cosmodrome in the Russian SSR. A Molniya-M carrier rocket with a 2BL upper stage was used to perform the launch, which took place at 02:59 UTC on 28 June 1978. The launch successfully placed the satellite into a molniya orbit. It subsequently received its Kosmos designation, and the international designator 1978-066A. The United States Space Command assigned it the Satellite Catalog Number 10970.

Podvig says that moved from its orbital position in October 1979.

== See also ==
- 1978 in spaceflight
- List of Kosmos satellites (1001–1250)
- List of Oko satellites
- List of R-7 launches (1975-1979)
