= Kosmos 919 =

Soviet anti-ballistic missile target satellite

- Mission type: ABM radar target
- COSPAR ID: 1977-051A
- SATCAT no.: 10070

Spacecraft properties
- Spacecraft type: DS-P1-I
- Manufacturer: Yuzhnoye
- Launch mass: 400 kilograms (880 lb)

Start of mission
- Launch date: 18 June 1977, 10:30 UTC
- Rocket: Kosmos-2I 63SM
- Launch site: Plesetsk 133/1

End of mission
- Decay date: 28 August 1978

Orbital parameters
- Reference system: Geocentric
- Regime: Low Earth
- Perigee altitude: 269 kilometres (167 mi)
- Apogee altitude: 822 kilometres (511 mi)
- Inclination: 71 degrees
- Period: 95.6 minutes

Kosmos 919 (Russian: Космос 919 meaning Cosmos 919), also known as DS-P1-I No.19 was a satellite which was used as a radar target for anti-ballistic missile tests. It was launched by the Soviet Union in 1977 as part of the Dnepropetrovsk Sputnik programme.

It was launched aboard a Kosmos-2I 63SM rocket, from Site 133/1 at Plesetsk. The launch occurred at 10:30 UTC on 18 June 1977. It was the final flight of the Kosmos-2I carrier rocket, and the final flight of an R-12 family rocket. Kosmos launches continued using the R-14-derived Kosmos-3M. It also marked the last launch from Plesetsk Site 133/1 until it was rebuilt as Site 133/3 in 1985.

Kosmos 919 was placed into a low Earth orbit with a perigee of 269 kilometres (167 mi), an apogee of 822 kilometres (511 mi), 71 degrees of inclination, and an orbital period of 95.6 minutes. It decayed from orbit on 28 August 1978.

Kosmos 919 was the last of nineteen DS-P-I satellites to be launched. Of these, all reached orbit successfully except the seventh.

== See also ==
- 1977 in spaceflight
