= Kosmos 901 =

Soviet anti-ballistic missile radar target

- Mission type: ABM radar target
- COSPAR ID: 1977-025A
- SATCAT no.: 09905

Spacecraft properties
- Spacecraft type: DS-P1-I
- Manufacturer: Yuzhnoye
- Launch mass: 400 kilograms (880 lb)

Start of mission
- Launch date: 5 April 1977, 10:30 UTC
- Rocket: Kosmos-2I 63SM
- Launch site: Plesetsk 133/1

End of mission
- Decay date: 28 June 1978

Orbital parameters
- Reference system: Geocentric
- Regime: Low Earth
- Perigee altitude: 269 kilometres (167 mi)
- Apogee altitude: 820 kilometres (510 mi)
- Inclination: 71 degrees
- Period: 95.5 minutes

Kosmos 901 (Russian: Космос 901 meaning Cosmos 901), also known as DS-P1-I No.18 was a satellite which was used as a radar target for anti-ballistic missile tests. It was launched by the Soviet Union in 1977 as part of the Dnepropetrovsk Sputnik programme.

It was launched aboard a Kosmos-2I 63SM rocket, from Site 133/1 at Plesetsk. The launch occurred at 10:30 UTC on 5 April 1977.

Kosmos 901 was placed into a low Earth orbit with a perigee of 269 kilometres (167 mi), an apogee of 820 kilometres (510 mi), 71 degrees of inclination, and an orbital period of 95.5 minutes. It decayed from orbit on 28 June 1978.

Kosmos 901 was the eighteenth of nineteen DS-P1-I satellites to be launched. Of these, all reached orbit successfully except the seventh.

== See also ==
- 1977 in spaceflight
