= Kosmos 1030 =

Soviet military early warning satellite

- Mission type: Early warning
- COSPAR ID: 1978-083A
- SATCAT no.: 11015
- Mission duration: 4 years

Spacecraft properties
- Spacecraft type: US-K
- Launch mass: 1,900 kilograms (4,200 lb)

Start of mission
- Launch date: 6 September 1978, 03:04 UTC
- Rocket: Molniya-M/2BL
- Launch site: Plesetsk Cosmodrome

End of mission
- Deactivated: 10 October 1978
- Decay date: 17 August 2004

Orbital parameters
- Reference system: Geocentric
- Regime: Molniya
- Perigee altitude: 667 kilometres (414 mi)
- Apogee altitude: 39,737 kilometres (24,691 mi)
- Inclination: 62.8 degrees
- Period: 718.77 minutes

Kosmos 1030 (Russian: Космос 1030 meaning Cosmos 1030) was a Soviet US-K missile early warning satellite which was launched in 1978 as part of the Soviet military's Oko programme. The satellite was designed to identify missile launches using optical telescopes and infrared sensors.

== Launch ==
Kosmos 1030 was launched from Site 43/4 at Plesetsk Cosmodrome in the Russian SSR. A Molniya-M carrier rocket with a 2BL upper stage was used to perform the launch, which took place at 03:04 UTC on 6 September 1978.

== Orbit ==
The launch successfully placed the satellite into a molniya orbit. It subsequently received its Kosmos designation, and the international designator 1978-083A. The United States Space Command assigned it the Satellite Catalog Number 11015.

The satellite self-destructed on October 10, 1978, breaking into 13 pieces of which several are still on orbit.

== See also ==
- 1978 in spaceflight
- List of Kosmos satellites (1001–1250)
- List of Oko satellites
- List of R-7 launches (1975-1979)
