= Kosmos 959 =

Soviet anti-satellite test target satellite

- Mission type: ASAT target
- COSPAR ID: 1977-101A
- SATCAT no.: 10419

Spacecraft properties
- Spacecraft type: Lira
- Manufacturer: Yuzhnoye
- Launch mass: 650 kilograms (1,430 lb)

Start of mission
- Launch date: 21 October 1977, 10:05 UTC
- Rocket: Kosmos-3M
- Launch site: Plesetsk 132/1

End of mission
- Disposal: Deorbited
- Decay date: 30 November 1977

Orbital parameters
- Reference system: Geocentric
- Regime: Low Earth
- Perigee altitude: 146 kilometres (91 mi)
- Apogee altitude: 850 kilometres (530 mi)
- Inclination: 65.8 degrees
- Period: 94.6 minutes

Kosmos 959 (Russian: Космос 959 meaning Cosmos 959) was a satellite which was used as a target for tests of anti-satellite weapons. It was launched by the Soviet Union in 1977 as part of the Dnepropetrovsk Sputnik programme, and used as a target for Kosmos 961, as part of the Istrebitel Sputnikov programme.

It was launched aboard a Kosmos-3M carrier rocket, from Site 132/1 at the Plesetsk Cosmodrome. The launch occurred at 10:05 UTC on 21 October 1977.

Kosmos 959 was placed into a low Earth orbit with a perigee of 146 kilometres (91 mi), an apogee of 850 kilometres (530 mi), 65.8 degrees of inclination, and an orbital period of 94.6 minutes. It was successfully intercepted by Kosmos 961, as part of a non-destructive test. Following this, it decayed from orbit on 30 November 1977.

Kosmos 959 was the sixth of ten Lira satellites to be launched, of which all but the first were successful. Lira was derived from the earlier DS-P1-M satellite, which it replaced.

== See also ==
- 1977 in spaceflight
