= Kosmos 862 =

Soviet military early warning satellite

- Mission type: Early warning
- COSPAR ID: 1976-105A
- SATCAT no.: 9495
- Mission duration: 4 years

Spacecraft properties
- Spacecraft type: US-K
- Launch mass: 1,900 kilograms (4,200 lb)

Start of mission
- Launch date: 22 October 1976, 09:12 UTC
- Rocket: Molniya-M/2BL
- Launch site: Plesetsk Cosmodrome

End of mission
- Deactivated: 15 March 1977

Orbital parameters
- Reference system: Geocentric
- Regime: Molniya
- Perigee altitude: 612 kilometres (380 mi)
- Apogee altitude: 39,763 kilometres (24,708 mi)
- Inclination: 62.9 degrees
- Period: 718.21 minutes

Kosmos 862 (Russian: Космос 862 meaning Cosmos 862) was a Soviet US-K missile early warning satellite which was launched in 1976 as part of the Soviet military's Oko programme. The satellite was designed to identify missile launches using optical telescopes and infrared sensors.

== Launch ==
Kosmos 862 was launched from Site 43/4 at Plesetsk Cosmodrome in the Russian SSR. A Molniya-M carrier rocket with a 2BL upper stage was used to perform the launch, which took place at 09:12 UTC on 22 October 1976.

== Orbit ==
The launch successfully placed the satellite into a molniya orbit. It subsequently received its Kosmos designation, and the international designator 1976-105A. The United States Space Command assigned it the Satellite Catalog Number 9495.

The satellite self-destructed on March 15, 1977, breaking into 13 pieces of which several are still on orbit.

== See also ==
- 1976 in spaceflight
- List of Kosmos satellites (751–1000)
- List of Oko satellites
- List of R-7 launches (1975-1979)
