= Kosmos 909 =

Soviet anti-satellite target test satellite

- Mission type: ASAT target
- COSPAR ID: 1977-036A
- SATCAT no.: 10010

Spacecraft properties
- Spacecraft type: Lira
- Manufacturer: Yuzhnoye
- Launch mass: 650 kilograms (1,430 lb)

Start of mission
- Launch date: 19 May 1977, 16:30 UTC
- Rocket: Kosmos-3M
- Launch site: Plesetsk 132/2

Orbital parameters
- Reference system: Geocentric
- Regime: Low Earth
- Perigee altitude: 985 kilometres (612 mi)
- Apogee altitude: 2,111 kilometres (1,312 mi)
- Inclination: 65.9 degrees
- Period: 117 minutes

Kosmos 909 (Russian: Космос 909 meaning Cosmos 909) was a satellite which was used as a target for tests of anti-satellite weapons. It was launched by the Soviet Union in 1977 as part of the Dnepropetrovsk Sputnik programme, and used as a target for Kosmos 910 and Kosmos 918, as part of the Istrebitel Sputnikov programme.

It was launched aboard a Kosmos-3M carrier rocket, from Site 132/2 at the Plesetsk Cosmodrome. The launch occurred at 16:30 UTC on 19 May 1977.

Kosmos 909 was placed into a low Earth orbit with a perigee of 985 kilometres (612 mi), an apogee of 2,111 kilometres (1,312 mi), 65.9 degrees of inclination, and an orbital period of 117 minutes. Attempted interceptions by Kosmos 910 and 918 on 23 May and 17 June respectively failed, and as of 2009 Kosmos 909 remains in orbit.

Kosmos 909 was the fifth of ten Lira satellites to be launched, of which all but the first were successful. Lira was derived from the earlier DS-P1-M satellite, which it replaced.

== See also ==
- 1977 in spaceflight
