= Kosmos 803 =

Soviet anti-satellite test target satellite

- Mission type: ASAT target
- COSPAR ID: 1976-014A
- SATCAT no.: 08688

Spacecraft properties
- Spacecraft type: Lira
- Manufacturer: Yuzhnoye
- Launch mass: 650 kilograms (1,430 lb)

Start of mission
- Launch date: 12 February 1976, 13:00 UTC
- Rocket: Kosmos-3M
- Launch site: Plesetsk 132/2

Orbital parameters
- Reference system: Geocentric
- Regime: Low Earth
- Perigee altitude: 505 kilometres (314 mi)
- Apogee altitude: 555 kilometres (345 mi)
- Inclination: 65.9 degrees
- Period: 95.2 minutes

Kosmos 803 (Russian: Космос 803 meaning Cosmos 803) was a satellite which was used as a target for tests of anti-satellite weapons. It was launched by the Soviet Union in 1976 as part of the Dnepropetrovsk Sputnik programme, and used as a target for Kosmos 804 and Kosmos 814, as part of the Istrebitel Sputnikov programme.

It was launched aboard a Kosmos-3M carrier rocket, from Site 132/2 at the Plesetsk Cosmodrome. The launch occurred at 13:00 UTC on 12 February 1976.

Kosmos 803 was placed into a low Earth orbit with a perigee of 505 kilometres (314 mi), an apogee of 555 kilometres (345 mi), 65.9 degrees of inclination, and an orbital period of 95.2 minutes. It was used for a non-destructive intercept test, with both Kosmos 804 and Kosmos 814 intercepting it before deorbiting themselves. As of 2009, it is still in orbit.

Kosmos 803 was the second of ten Lira satellites to be launched, of which all but the first were successful. It was the first Lira satellite to successfully reach orbit. Lira was derived from the earlier DS-P1-M satellite, which it replaced.

== See also ==
- 1976 in spaceflight
