= Kosmos 967 =

Soviet anti-satellite test target satellite

- Mission type: ASAT target
- COSPAR ID: 1977-116A
- SATCAT no.: 10512
- Mission duration: 47 years, 10 months and 21 days (in orbit)

Spacecraft properties
- Spacecraft type: Lira
- Manufacturer: Yuzhnoye
- Launch mass: 650 kilograms (1,430 lb)

Start of mission
- Launch date: 13 December 1977, 15:53 UTC
- Rocket: Kosmos-3M
- Launch site: Plesetsk 132/1

Orbital parameters
- Reference system: Geocentric
- Regime: Low Earth
- Perigee altitude: 961 kilometres (597 mi)
- Apogee altitude: 1,003 kilometres (623 mi)
- Inclination: 65.8 degrees
- Period: 104.7 minutes

Kosmos 967 (Russian: Космос 967 meaning Cosmos 967) is a satellite which was used as a target for tests of anti-satellite weapons. It was launched by the Soviet Union in 1977 as part of the Dnepropetrovsk Sputnik programme, and used as a target for Kosmos 970 and Kosmos 1009, as part of the Istrebitel Sputnikov programme.

It was launched aboard a Kosmos-3M carrier rocket, from Site 132/1 at the Plesetsk Cosmodrome. The launch occurred at 15:53 UTC on 13 December 1977.

Kosmos 967 was placed into a low Earth orbit with a perigee of 961 kilometres (597 mi), an apogee of 1,003 kilometres (623 mi), 65.8 degrees of inclination, and an orbital period of 104.7 minutes. It was successfully intercepted by Kosmos 970 in a non-destructive test on 21 December 1977. It was then re-used by Kosmos 1009 on 19 May 1978. Both tests were successful, and both left Kosmos 967 intact. As of 2023, it is still in orbit.

Kosmos 967 was the seventh of ten Lira satellites to be launched, of which all but the first were successful. Lira was derived from the earlier DS-P1-M satellite, which it replaced.

== See also ==
- 1977 in spaceflight
