= Kosmos 839 =

Soviet anti-satellite test target satellite

- Mission type: ASAT target
- COSPAR ID: 1976-067A
- SATCAT no.: 09011

Spacecraft properties
- Spacecraft type: Lira
- Manufacturer: Yuzhnoye
- Launch mass: 650 kilograms (1,430 lb)

Start of mission
- Launch date: 8 July 1976, 21:08 UTC
- Rocket: Kosmos-3M
- Launch site: Plesetsk 132/1

Orbital parameters
- Reference system: Geocentric
- Regime: Low Earth
- Perigee altitude: 915 kilometres (569 mi)
- Apogee altitude: 2,053 kilometres (1,276 mi)
- Inclination: 65.9 degrees
- Period: 115.6 minutes

Kosmos 839 (Russian: Космос 839 meaning Cosmos 839) was a satellite which was used as a target for tests of anti-satellite weapons. It was launched by the Soviet Union in 1976 as part of the Dnepropetrovsk Sputnik programme, and used as a target for Kosmos 843 as part of the Istrebitel Sputnikov programme.

It was launched aboard a Kosmos-3M carrier rocket, from Site 132/1 at the Plesetsk Cosmodrome. The launch occurred at 21:08 UTC on 8 July 1976.

Kosmos 839 was placed into a low Earth orbit with a perigee of 915 kilometres (569 mi), an apogee of 2,053 kilometres (1,276 mi), 65.9 degrees of inclination, and an orbital period of 115.6 minutes. It was successfully intercepted by Kosmos 843 on 21 July. As of 2009, debris is still in orbit.

Kosmos 839 was the third of ten Lira satellites to be launched, of which all but the first were successful. Lira was derived from the earlier DS-P1-M satellite, which it replaced.

== See also ==
- 1976 in spaceflight
