= Kosmos 880 =

Soviet anti-satellite target test satellite

- Mission type: ASAT target
- COSPAR ID: 1976-120A
- SATCAT no.: 09601

Spacecraft properties
- Spacecraft type: Lira
- Manufacturer: Yuzhnoye
- Launch mass: 650 kilograms (1,430 lb)

Start of mission
- Launch date: 9 December 1976, 20:00 UTC
- Rocket: Kosmos-3M
- Launch site: Plesetsk 132/2

Orbital parameters
- Reference system: Geocentric
- Regime: Low Earth
- Perigee altitude: 558 kilometres (347 mi)
- Apogee altitude: 614 kilometres (382 mi)
- Inclination: 65.8 degrees
- Period: 96.3 minutes

Kosmos 880 (Russian: Космос 880 meaning Cosmos 880) was a satellite which was used as a target for tests of anti-satellite weapons. It was launched by the Soviet Union in 1976 as part of the Dnepropetrovsk Sputnik programme, and used as a target for Kosmos 886, as part of the Istrebitel Sputnikov programme.

It was launched aboard a Kosmos-3M carrier rocket, from Site 132/2 at the Plesetsk Cosmodrome. The launch occurred at 20:00 UTC on 9 December 1976.

Kosmos 880 was placed into a low Earth orbit with a perigee of 558 kilometres (347 mi), an apogee of 614 kilometres (382 mi), 65.8 degrees of inclination, and an orbital period of 96.3 minutes. It was successfully intercepted and destroyed by Kosmos 886 on 27 December 1976. The last catalogued piece of debris decayed from orbit on 9 December 2001 (although pieces of debris of Kosmos 886, the intercepting device, remain in orbit as of 2023).

Kosmos 880 was the fourth of ten Lira satellites to be launched, of which all but the first were successful. Lira was derived from the earlier DS-P1-M satellite, which it replaced.

== See also ==
- 1976 in spaceflight
