= Tselina (satellite) =

Soviet Union satellite

Tselina (Russian: Целина) were a series of military SIGINT satellites originally developed in the former Soviet Union and used in the past Russian military. These satellites could pinpoint the exact location of objects emitting radio signals. They could even identify the type of emitter, its operational modes, and its activity level. This function proved valuable for detecting potential military operations by monitoring increased radio communication activity. By providing early warning of such activity, Tselina offered valuable intel that might not have been obtainable through other means.

== Variants ==
Initially divided into "Overview" (Tselina-O) and "Detailed" (Tselina-D), since about 1980 the system has been integrated into a single satellite, Tselina-P, which is also known as Tselina-2. The system's primary subject was enemy's radar equipment. Tselina had been numbered as part of the Kosmos series. In total 130 Tselina satellites were launched.

- Tselina-O satellites were launched using Kosmos-3M rockets between 1967 and 1982.
- Tselina-D used the Vostok-2M and later the Tsyklon-3. Deployed between 1970 and 1992.
- Four upgraded Tselina-Ds, named Tselina-R, were also launched using the Tsyklon between 1986 and 1993
- Tselina-2 satellites were designed for launch on Zenit-2 launch vehicles, however the first two launches used the larger Proton-K / DM-2 as the Zenit was still undergoing development. The most recent launch used the modernised Zenit-2M launch vehicle. Deployed between 1984 and 2004
