= 1977 in spaceflight =

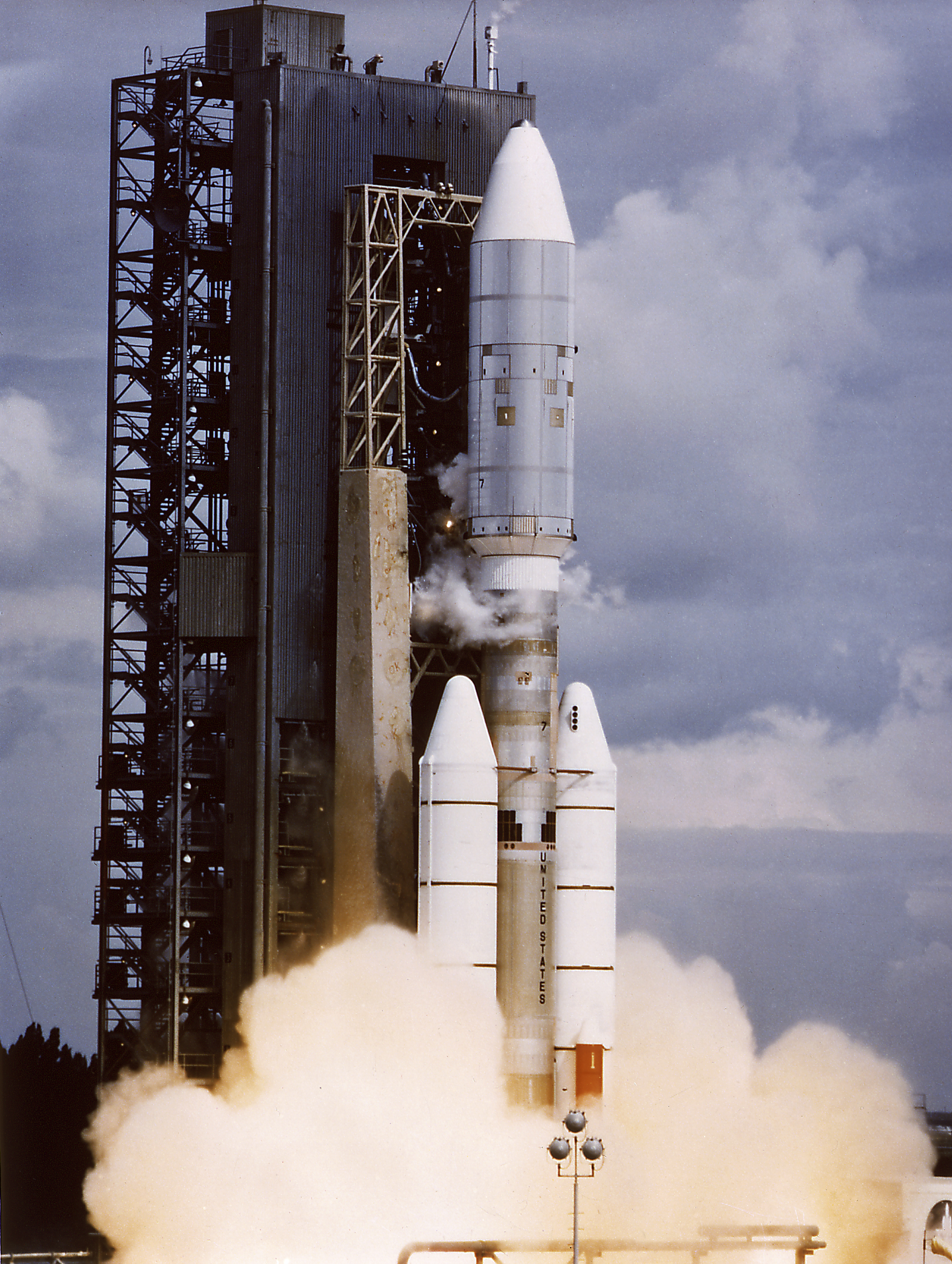
- Launch of Voyager 2 on a Titan IIIE

Orbital launches
- First: 6 January
- Last: 27 December
- Total: 130
- Catalogued: 124

Rockets
- Maiden flights: Mu-3H; Tsyklon-3
- Retirements: Kosmos-2I; Titan IIIE

Crewed flights
- Orbital: 3
- Total travellers: 6

1977 in spaceflight

Spaceflight in 1977 included some important events such as the roll out of the Space Shuttle orbiter, Voyager 1 and Voyager space probes were launched. NASA received the Space Shuttle orbiter later named Enterprise, on 14 January. This unpowered sub-orbital space plane was launched off the top of a modified 747 and was flown uncrewed until 13 August until a human crew landed the Enterprise for the first time.

In August and September, the two Voyager spacecraft to the outer planets were launched. Voyager 2, launched on 20 August, went on to fly past Jupiter, Saturn, Uranus and Neptune. Voyager 1, which was launched on 5 September, flew past Jupiter and Saturn, with a planned flyby of Pluto being cancelled in favour of a closer flyby of Titan.

== Launches ==
Date and time (UTC)	Rocket	Flight number	Launch site		LSP	
Date and time (UTC)	Payload (⚀ = CubeSat)	Operator	Orbit	Function	Decay (UTC)	Outcome
Date and time (UTC)	Remarks					
19 February; 05:15	(Japan) M-3H		(Japan) Kagoshima Space Center LP-M		(Japan) ISAS	
19 February; 05:15	(Japan) MS-T3 (Tansei 3)	ISAS	Highly elliptical orbit	Technology test	In orbit	Successful
19 February; 05:15	First flight of M-3H					
16 June; 10:51:00	(United States) Delta 2914		(United States) Cape Canaveral LC-17B		(United States)	
16 June; 10:51:00	(United States) GOES 2	NOAA	Current: Graveyard; Operational: Geostationary	Weather	In orbit	Successful
16 June; 10:51:00	Retired on 5 May 2001 and moved to a graveyard orbit					
20 August; 14:29:44	(United States) Titan IIIE		(United States) Cape Canaveral LC-41		(United States)	
20 August; 14:29:44	(United States) Voyager 2	NASA	Heliocentric to Galactocentric	Planetary	In orbit	Successful; Operational
20 August; 14:29:44	Spacecraft flew past Jupiter, Saturn, Uranus and Neptune, first spacecraft to visit Uranus and Neptune					
5 September; 12:56:01	(United States) Titan IIIE		(United States) Cape Canaveral LC-41		(United States)	
5 September; 12:56:01	(United States) Voyager 1	NASA	Heliocentric to Galactocentric	Planetary	In orbit	Successful; Operational
5 September; 12:56:01	Final flight of Titan IIIE, spacecraft flew past Jupiter and Saturn					

== Deep space rendezvous ==
Date	Spacecraft	Event	Remarks
20 February	Viking Orbiter 1	Flyby of Phobos	Closest approach: 89 kilometres (55 mi)
October	Viking Orbiter 2	Flyby of Deimos	

== EVAs ==
Start date/time	Duration	End time	Spacecraft	Crew	Remarks
19 December; 21:36	1 hour 28 minutes	23:04	Salyut 6 PE-1	(Soviet Union) Georgi Grechko (full) (Soviet Union) Yuri Romanenko (stand-up)	First Russian EVA in over 8 years and the first use of the Orlan-D spacesuit. Grechko inspected the front docking port for damage from the failed Soyuz 25 docking and found no damage, while Romanenko assisted from the open hatch.
