= List of Kosmos satellites (251–500) =

The designation Kosmos (Russian: Космос meaning Cosmos) is a generic name given to a large number of Soviet, and subsequently Russian, satellites, the first of which was launched in 1962. Satellites given Kosmos designations include military spacecraft, failed probes to the Moon and the planets, prototypes for crewed spacecraft, and scientific spacecraft. This is a list of satellites with Kosmos designations between 251 and 500.

Designation	Type	Launch date (GMT)	Carrier rocket	Function	Decay/Destruction*	Remarks
Kosmos 251	Zenit-4M	31 October 1968; 09:14	Voskhod 11A57	Reconnaissance	18 November 1968	
Kosmos 252	IS-A	1 November 1968; 00:27	Tsyklon-2A 11K67	ASAT test	1 November 1968*	Intercepted and destroyed Kosmos 248
Kosmos 253	Zenit-2	13 November 1968; 12:00	Voskhod 11A57	Reconnaissance	18 November 1968	
Kosmos 254	Zenit-4	21 November 1968; 12:10	Voskhod 11A57	Reconnaissance	29 November 1968	
Kosmos 255	Zenit-2	29 November 1968; 12:40	Voskhod 11A57	Reconnaissance	7 December 1968	
Kosmos 256	Sfera	30 November 1968; 12:00	Kosmos-3M 11K65M	Geodesy	in orbit	
Kosmos 257	DS-P1-Yu	3 December 1968; 14:52	Kosmos-2I 63SM	Radar target	5 March 1969	DS-P1-Yu #17, seventeenth of seventy nine DS-P1-Yu satellites
Kosmos 258	Zenit-2	10 December 1968; 08:25	Voskhod 11A57	Reconnaissance	18 December 1968	
Kosmos 259	DS-U2-I	14 December 1968; 05:09	Kosmos-2I 63SM	Ionospheric	5 May 1969	DS-U2-I #3, third of three DS-U2-I satellites
Kosmos 260	Molniya-1Yu	16 December 1968; 09:15	Molniya-M 8K78M	Communication	9 July 1973	
Kosmos 261	DS-U2-GK	19 December 1968; 23:55	Kosmos-2I 63SM	Studied air density in the upper atmosphere and polar auroras.	12 February 1969	Kosmos 261 marked the way to the Intercosmos Program. DS-U2-GK #1, first of two DS-U2-GK satellites
Kosmos 262	DS-U2-GF	26 December 1968; 09:45	Kosmos-2I 63SM	Studied VUV (Vacuum Ultraviolet Light) and Soft X-ray radiation.	18 July 1969	First satellite to study VUV and soft X-ray radiation. DS-U2-GF #1, only DS-U2-GF satellite
Kosmos 263	Zenit-2	12 January 1969; 12:10	Voskhod 11A57	Reconnaissance	20 January 1969	
Kosmos 264	Zenit-4M	23 January 1969; 09:15	Voskhod 11A57	Reconnaissance	5 February 1969	
Kosmos 265	DS-P1-Yu	7 February 1969; 13:59	Kosmos-2I 63SM	Radar target	1 May 1969	DS-P1-Yu #21, eighteenth of seventy nine DS-P1-Yu satellites
Kosmos 266	Zenit-2	25 February 1969; 10:20	Voskhod 11A57	Reconnaissance	5 March 1969	
Kosmos 267	Zenit-4	26 February 1969; 08:30	Voskhod 11A57	Reconnaissance	6 March 1969	
Kosmos 268	DS-P1-Yu	5 March 1969; 13:04	Kosmos-2I 63SM	Radar target	9 May 1970	DS-P1-Yu #18, nineteenth of seventy nine DS-P1-Yu satellites
Kosmos 269	Tselina-O	5 March 1969; 17:25	Kosmos-3M 11K65M	ELINT	21 October 1978	
Kosmos 270	Zenit-4	6 March 1969; 12:15	Voskhod 11A57	Reconnaissance	14 March 1969	
Kosmos 271	Zenit-4	15 March 1969; 12:15	Voskhod 11A57	Reconnaissance	23 March 1969	
Kosmos 272	Sfera	17 March 1969; 16:40	Kosmos-3M 11K65M	Geodesy	in orbit	
Kosmos 273	Zenit-2	22 March 1969; 12:15	Voskhod 11A57	Reconnaissance	30 March 1969	
Kosmos 274	Zenit-4	24 March 1969; 10:10	Voskhod 11A57	Reconnaissance	1 April 1969	
Kosmos 275	DS-P1-I	28 March 1969; 16:00	Kosmos-2I 63SM	Radar target	7 February 1970	DS-P1-I #5, fifth of nineteen DS-P1-I satellites
Kosmos 276	Zenit-4	4 April 1969; 10:20	Voskhod 11A57	Reconnaissance	11 April 1969	
Kosmos 277	DS-P1-Yu	4 April 1969; 13:00	Kosmos-2I 63SM	Radar target	6 July 1969	DS-P1-Yu #20, twentieth of seventy nine DS-P1-Yu satellites
Kosmos 278	Zenit-2	9 April 1969; 13:00	Voskhod 11A57	Reconnaissance	17 April 1969	
Kosmos 279	Zenit-4	15 April 1969; 08:14	Voskhod 11A57	Reconnaissance	23 April 1969	
Kosmos 280	Zenit-4M	23 April 1969; 09:55	Voskhod 11A57	Reconnaissance	6 May 1969	
Kosmos 281	Zenit-2	13 May 1969; 09:15	Voskhod 11A57	Reconnaissance	21 May 1969	
Kosmos 282	Zenit-4	20 May 1969; 08:40	Voskhod 11A57	Reconnaissance	28 May 1969	
Kosmos 283	DS-P1-Yu	27 May 1969; 12:59	Kosmos-2I 63SM	Radar target	10 December 1969	DS-P1-Yu #19, twenty-first of seventy nine DS-P1-Yu satellites
Kosmos 284	Zenit-4	29 May 1969; 06:59	Voskhod 11A57	Reconnaissance	6 June 1969	
Kosmos 285	DS-P1-Yu	3 June 1969; 12:57	Kosmos-2I 63SM	Radar target	7 October 1969	DS-P1-Yu #24, twenty-second of seventy nine DS-P1-Yu satellites
Kosmos 286	Zenit-4	15 June 1969; 08:59	Voskhod 11A57	Reconnaissance	23 June 1969	
Kosmos 287	Zenit-2	24 June 1969; 06:50	Voskhod 11A57	Reconnaissance	2 July 1969	
Kosmos 288	Zenit-4	27 June 1969; 06:59	Voskhod 11A57	Reconnaissance	5 July 1969	
Kosmos 289	Zenit-4	10 July 1969; 09:00	Voskhod 11A57	Reconnaissance	15 July 1969	
Kosmos 290	Zenit-2	22 July 1969; 12:30	Voskhod 11A57	Reconnaissance	30 July 1969	
Kosmos 291	IS-M	6 August 1969; 05:40	Tsyklon-2 11K69	ASAT target	8 September 1969	Spacecraft propulsion system failed, interceptor not launched.
Kosmos 292	Tsiklon	13 August 1969; 22:00	Kosmos-3M 11K65M	Navigation	in orbit	
Kosmos 293	Zenit-2M	16 August 1969; 11:59	Voskhod 11A57	Reconnaissance	28 August 1969	
Kosmos 294	Zenit-4	19 August 1969; 13:00	Voskhod 11A57	Reconnaissance	27 August 1969	
Kosmos 295	DS-P1-Yu	22 August 1969; 14:14	Kosmos-2I 63SM	Radar target	1 December 1969	DS-P1-Yu #29, twenty-fourth of seventy nine DS-P1-Yu satellites
Kosmos 296	Zenit-4	29 August 1969; 09:05	Voskhod 11A57	Reconnaissance	6 September 1969	
Kosmos 297	Zenit-4	2 September 1969; 11:00	Voskhod 11A57	Reconnaissance	10 September 1969	
Kosmos 298	OGCh	15 September 1969; 16:05	R-36O 8K69	FOBS	15 September 1969	
Kosmos 299	Zenit-4	18 September 1969; 08:40	Voskhod 11A57	Reconnaissance	22 September 1969	
Kosmos 300	E-8-5	23 September 1969; 14:07	Proton-K/D 8K82K	Lunar sample return	27 September 1969	
Kosmos 301	Zenit-2	24 September 1969; 12:15	Voskhod 11A57	Reconnaissance	2 October 1969	
Kosmos 302	Zenit-4	17 October 1969; 11:45	Voskhod 11A57	Reconnaissance	25 October 1969	
Kosmos 303	DS-P1-Yu	18 October 1969; 10:00	Kosmos-2I 63SM	Radar target	23 January 1970	DS-P1-Yu #28, twenty-fifth of seventy nine DS-P1-Yu satellites
Kosmos 304	Tsiklon	21 October 1969; 12:49	Kosmos-3M 11K65M	Navigation	in orbit	
Kosmos 305	E-8-5	22 October 1969; 14:09	Proton-K/D 8K82K	Lunar sample return	24 October 1969	
Kosmos 306	Zenit-2M	24 October 1969; 09:40	Voskhod 11A57	Reconnaissance	5 November 1969	
Kosmos 307	DS-P1-Yu	24 October 1969; 13:01	Kosmos-2I 63SM	Radar target	30 December 1970	DS-P1-Yu #22, twenty-sixth of seventy nine DS-P1-Yu satellites
Kosmos 308	DS-P1-I	4 November 1969; 11:59	Kosmos-2I 63SM	Radar target	4 January 1970	DS-P1-I #7, sixth of nineteen DS-P1-I satellites
Kosmos 309	Zenit-2	12 November 1969; 11:30	Voskhod 11A57	Reconnaissance	20 November 1969	
Kosmos 310	Zenit-4	15 November 1969; 08:30	Voskhod 11A57	Reconnaissance	23 November 1969	
Kosmos 311	DS-P1-Yu	24 November 1969; 11:00	Kosmos-2I 63SM	Radar target	10 March 1970	DS-P1-Yu #27, twenty-seventh of seventy nine DS-P1-Yu satellites
Kosmos 312	Sfera	24 November 1969; 16:49	Kosmos-3M 11K65M	Geodesy	in orbit	
Kosmos 313	Zenit-2M	3 December 1969; 13:20	Voskhod 11A57	Reconnaissance	15 December 1969	
Kosmos 314	DS-P1-Yu	11 December 1969; 12:58	Kosmos-2I 63SM	Radar target	22 March 1970	DS-P1-Yu #30, twenty-eighth of seventy nine DS-P1-Yu satellites
Kosmos 315	Tselina-O	20 December 1969; 03:26	Kosmos-3M 11K65M	ELINT	25 March 1979	
Kosmos 316	IS-A	23 December 1969; 09:25	Tsyklon-2 11K69	Boilerplate ASAT	28 August 1970	Debris recovered in the United States
Kosmos 317	Zenit-4MK	23 December 1969; 13:50	Voskhod 11A57	Reconnaissance	5 January 1970	
Kosmos 318	Zenit-2M	9 January 1970; 09:20	Voskhod 11A57	Reconnaissance	21 January 1970	
Kosmos 319	DS-P1-Yu	15 January 1970; 13:39	Kosmos-2I 63SM	Radar target	1 July 1970	DS-P1-Yu #25, twenty-ninth of seventy nine DS-P1-Yu satellites
Kosmos 320	DS-MO	16 January 1970; 10:59	Kosmos-2I 63SM	Technology	10 February 1970	DS-MO #3, second of two DS-MO satellites
Kosmos 321	DS-U2-MG	20 January 1970; 20:20	Kosmos-2I 63SM	Magnetospheric	23 March 1970	DS-U2-MG #1, first of two DS-U2-MG satellites
Kosmos 322	Zenit-4	21 January 1970; 12:00	Voskhod 11A57	Reconnaissance	29 January 1970	
Kosmos 323	Zenit-4	10 February 1970; 12:00	Voskhod 11A57	Reconnaissance	18 February 1970	
Kosmos 324	DS-P1-Yu	27 February 1970; 17:24	Kosmos-2I 63SM	Radar target	23 May 1970	DS-P1-Yu #32, thirtieth of seventy nine DS-P1-Yu satellites
Kosmos 325	Zenit-2	4 March 1970; 12:14	Voskhod 11A57	Reconnaissance	12 March 1970	
Kosmos 326	Zenit-2	13 March 1970; 08:00	Voskhod 11A57	Reconnaissance	21 March 1970	
Kosmos 327	DS-P1-I	18 March 1970; 14:39	Kosmos-2I 63SM	Radar target	19 January 1971	DS-P1-I #8, eighth of nineteen DS-P1-I satellites
Kosmos 328	Zenit-4MK	27 March 1970; 11:45	Voskhod 11A57	Reconnaissance	9 April 1970	
Kosmos 329	Zenit-2M	3 April 1970; 08:30	Voskhod 11A57	Reconnaissance	15 April 1970	
Kosmos 330	Tselina-O	7 April 1970; 11:10	Kosmos-3M 11K65M	ELINT	12 June 1979	
Kosmos 331	Zenit-4	8 April 1970; 10:15	Voskhod 11A57	Reconnaissance	16 April 1970	
Kosmos 332	Tsiklon	11 April 1970; 17:00	Kosmos-3M 11K65M	Navigation	in orbit	
Kosmos 333	Zenit-4M	15 April 1970; 09:00	Voskhod 11A57	Reconnaissance	28 April 1970	
Kosmos 334	DS-P1-Yu	23 April 1970; 13:20	Kosmos-2I 63SM	Radar target	9 August 1970	DS-P1-Yu #31, thirty-first of seventy nine DS-P1-Yu satellites
Kosmos 335	DS-U1-R	24 April 1970; 22:24	Kosmos-2I 63SM	Atmospheric	22 June 1970	DS-U1-R #1, only DS-U1-R satellite
Kosmos 336	Strela-1M	25 April 1970; 17:09	Kosmos-3M 11K65M	Communication	in orbit	Plesetsk launch. Orbits 1313 x 1554 km. Inclinations 74 degrees. First launch of 8 satellites on one rocket. Each satellite believed to be a spheroid about 1 meter long and 80 cm diameter.
Kosmos 337	Strela-1M	25 April 1970; 17:09	Kosmos-3M 11K65M	Communication		Plesetsk launch. Orbits 1313 x 1554 km. Inclinations 74 degrees. First launch of 8 satellites on one rocket. Each satellite believed to be a spheroid about 1 meter long and 80 cm diameter.
Kosmos 338	Strela-1M	25 April 1970; 17:09	Kosmos-3M 11K65M	Communication		Plesetsk launch. Orbits 1313 x 1554 km. Inclinations 74 degrees. First launch of 8 satellites on one rocket. Each satellite believed to be a spheroid about 1 meter long and 80 cm diameter.
Kosmos 339	Strela-1M	25 April 1970; 17:09	Kosmos-3M 11K65M	Communication		Plesetsk launch. Orbits 1313 x 1554 km. Inclinations 74 degrees. First launch of 8 satellites on one rocket. Each satellite believed to be a spheroid about 1 meter long and 80 cm diameter.
Kosmos 340	Strela-1M	25 April 1970; 17:09	Kosmos-3M 11K65M	Communication		Plesetsk launch. Orbits 1313 x 1554 km. Inclinations 74 degrees. First launch of 8 satellites on one rocket. Each satellite believed to be a spheroid about 1 meter long and 80 cm diameter.
Kosmos 341	Strela-1M	25 April 1970; 17:09	Kosmos-3M 11K65M	Communication		Plesetsk launch. Orbits 1313 x 1554 km. Inclinations 74 degrees. First launch of 8 satellites on one rocket. Each satellite believed to be a spheroid about 1 meter long and 80 cm diameter.
Kosmos 342	Strela-1M	25 April 1970; 17:09	Kosmos-3M 11K65M	Communication		Plesetsk launch. Orbits 1313 x 1554 km. Inclinations 74 degrees. First launch of 8 satellites on one rocket. Each satellite believed to be a spheroid about 1 meter long and 80 cm diameter.
Kosmos 343	Strela-1M	25 April 1970; 17:09	Kosmos-3M 11K65M	Communication		Plesetsk launch. Orbits 1313 x 1554 km. Inclinations 74 degrees. First launch of 8 satellites on one rocket. Each satellite believed to be a spheroid about 1 meter long and 80 cm diameter.
Kosmos 344	Zenit-2	12 May 1970; 10:10	Voskhod 11A57	Reconnaissance	20 May 1970	
Kosmos 345	Zenit-4	20 May 1970; 09:20	Voskhod 11A57	Reconnaissance	28 May 1970	
Kosmos 346	Zenit-4	10 June 1970; 09:30	Voskhod 11A57	Reconnaissance	17 June 1970	
Kosmos 347	DS-P1-Yu	12 June 1970; 09:30	Kosmos-2I 63SM	Radar target	7 November 1971	DS-P1-Yu #35, thirty-third of seventy nine DS-P1-Yu satellites
Kosmos 348	DS-U2-GK	13 June 1970; 04:59	Kosmos-2I 63SM	Aeronomy, Auroral	25 July 1970	DS-U2-GK #2, second of two DS-U2-GK satellites
Kosmos 349	Zenit-4	17 June 1970; 12:59	Voskhod 11A57	Reconnaissance	25 June 1970	
Kosmos 350	Zenit-2M	26 June 1970; 12:00	Voskhod 11A57	Reconnaissance	8 July 1970	
Kosmos 351	DS-P1-Yu	27 June 1970; 07:39	Kosmos-2I 63SM	Radar target	13 October 1970	DS-P1-Yu #38, thirty-fourth of seventy nine DS-P1-Yu satellites
Kosmos 352	Zenit-4	7 July 1970; 10:30	Voskhod 11A57	Reconnaissance	15 July 1970	
Kosmos 353	Zenit-2M	9 July 1970; 13:35	Voskhod 11A57	Reconnaissance	21 July 1970	
Kosmos 354	OGCh	28 July 1970; 22:00	R-36O 8K69	FOBS	28 July 1970	
Kosmos 355	Zenit-4	7 August 1970; 09:30	Voskhod 11A57	Reconnaissance	15 August 1970	
Kosmos 356	DS-U2-MG	10 August 1970; 19:59	Kosmos-2I 63SM	Magnetospheric	2 October 1970	DS-U2-MG #2, second of two DS-U2-MG satellites
Kosmos 357	DS-P1-Yu	19 August 1970; 14:59	Kosmos-2I 63SM	Radar target	24 November 1970	DS-P1-Yu #40, thirty-fifth of seventy nine DS-P1-Yu satellites
Kosmos 358	Tsiklon	20 August 1970; 14:30	Kosmos-3M 11K65M	Navigation	26 June 1990	Incorrect orbit
Kosmos 359	4V-1	22 August 1970; 05:06	Molniya-M 8K78M	Venus lander	6 November 1970	Baikonur launch. Failed to achieve escape velocity. Almost certainly intended to be Venera 8. Given the Kosmos number after failure.
Kosmos 360	Zenit-4M	29 August 1970; 08:30	Voskhod 11A57	Reconnaissance	8 September 1970	
Kosmos 361	Zenit-4M	8 September 1970; 10:30	Voskhod 11A57	Reconnaissance	21 September 1970	
Kosmos 362	DS-P1-I	16 September 1970; 11:59	Kosmos-2I 63SM	Radar target	13 October 1971	DS-P1-I #9, ninth of nineteen DS-P1-I satellites
Kosmos 363	Zenit-2M	17 September 1970; 08:10	Voskhod 11A57	Reconnaissance	29 September 1970	
Kosmos 364	Zenit-4MK	22 September 1970; 13:00	Voskhod 11A57	Reconnaissance	2 October 1970	
Kosmos 365	OGCh	25 September 1970; 14:05	R-36O 8K69M	FOBS	25 September 1970	
Kosmos 366	Zenit-2M	1 October 1970; 08:20	Voskhod 11A57	Reconnaissance	13 October 1970	
Kosmos 367	US-A	3 October 1970; 10:26	Tsyklon-2 11K69	Reconnaissance	31 October 1970	
Kosmos 368	Zenit-2M	8 October 1970; 12:39	Voskhod 11A57	Zenit-2M	14 October 1970	
Kosmos 369	DS-P1-Yu	8 October 1970; 15:10	Kosmos-2I 63SM	Radar target	22 January 1971	DS-P1-Yu #42, thirty-sixth of seventy nine DS-P1-Yu satellites
Kosmos 370	Zenit-4M	9 October 1970; 11:04	Voskhod 11A57	Reconnaissance	22 October 1970	
Kosmos 371	Tsiklon	12 October 1970; 13:57	Kosmos-3M 11K65M	Navigation	in orbit	
Kosmos 372	Strela-2	16 October 1970; 14:59	Kosmos-3M 11K65M	Communication	in orbit	
Kosmos 373	IS-M	20 October 1970; 05:38	Tsyklon-2 11K69	ASAT target	8 March 1980	Intercepted by Kosmos 374 and Kosmos 375 in non-destructive tests.
Kosmos 374	IS-A	23 October 1970; 04:42	Tsyklon-2 11K69	ASAT test	23 October 1970*	Performed non-destructive intercept of Kosmos 373, self-destructed after completion of test
Kosmos 375	IS-A	30 October 1970; 02:36	Tsyklon-2 11K69	ASAT test	30 October 1970*	Performed non-destructive intercept of Kosmos 373, self-destructed after completion of test
Kosmos 376	Zenit-4M	30 October 1970; 13:20	Voskhod 11A57	Reconnaissance	12 November 1970	
Kosmos 377	Zenit-2M	11 November 1970; 09:20	Voskhod 11A57	Reconnaissance	23 November 1970	
Kosmos 378	DS-U2-IP	17 November 1970; 18:20	Kosmos-3M 11K65M	Ionospheric	17 August 1972	DS-U2-IP #1, only DS-U2-IP satellite
Kosmos 379	LK-T2K	24 November 1970; 05:15	Soyuz-L 11A511L	Uncrewed research test vehicle for Soviet human lunar program.	21 September 1983	Baikonur launch. Orbital inclination 52 degrees. Uncrewed lunar program research, similar to Kosmos 398 and Kosmos 434.
Kosmos 380	DS-P1-Yu	24 November 1970; 10:59	Kosmos-2I 63SM	Radar target	17 June 1971	DS-P1-Yu #26, thirty-seventh of seventy nine DS-P1-Yu satellites
Kosmos 381	Ionosfernaya	2 December 1970; 04:00	Kosmos-3M 11K65M	Craft studied the physical structure of the layers of the Ionosphere.	Expected to decay in 1,200 years.	Plesetsk launch. Orbit 971 x 1,013 km. Incliation 74 degrees. Study of Ionosphere covered almost the entire Earth's surface.
Kosmos 382	Soyuz 7K-L1E	2 December 1970; 17:00	Proton-K/D 8K82K	Test	in orbit	
Kosmos 383	Zenit-4MK	3 December 1970; 13:55	Voskhod 11A57	Reconnaissance	16 December 1970	
Kosmos 384	Zenit-2M	10 December 1970; 11:10	Voskhod 11A57	Reconnaissance	22 December 1970	
Kosmos 385	Tsiklon	12 December 1970; 13:00	Kosmos-3M 11K65M	Navigation	in orbit	Orbit was a nearly circular 1000 km. First Navsat Kosmos to be placed in this orbit. All previous Navsat Kosmos satellites had been placed in orbits just within 800 km orbit. Inclination 74 degrees.
Kosmos 386	Zenit-4M	15 December 1970; 10:00	Voskhod 11A57	Reconnaissance	28 December 1970	
Kosmos 387	Tselina-O	16 December 1970; 04:29	Kosmos-3M 11K65M	ELINT	19 January 1980	
Kosmos 388	DS-P1-Yu	18 December 1970; 09:39	Kosmos-2I 63SM	Radar target	10 May 1971	DS-P1-Yu #43, thirty-eighth of seventy nine DS-P1-Yu satellites
Kosmos 389	Tselina-D	18 December 1970; 16:15	Vostok-2M 8A92M	ELINT	24 November 2003	
Kosmos 390	Zenit-4M	12 January 1971; 09:30	Voskhod 11A57	Reconnaissance	25 January 1971	
Kosmos 391	DS-P1-I	14 January 1971; 12:00	Kosmos-2I 63SM	Radar target	21 February 1972	DS-P1-I #11, tenth of nineteen DS-P1-I satellites
Kosmos 392	Zenit-2M	21 January 1971; 08:40	Voskhod 11A57	Reconnaissance	2 February 1971	
Kosmos 393	DS-P1-Yu	26 January 1971; 12:44	Kosmos-2I 63SM	Radar target	16 June 1971	DS-P1-Yu #34, thirty-ninth of seventy nine DS-P1-Yu satellites
Kosmos 394	DS-P1-M	9 February 1971; 18:48	Kosmos-3M 11K65M	ASAT target	25 February 1971*	DS-P1-M #2, second of five DS-P1-M satellites, intercepted and destroyed by Kosmos 397
Kosmos 395	Tselina-O	17 February 1971; 21:09	Kosmos-3M 11K65M	ELINT	6 April 1980	
Kosmos 396	Zenit-4M	18 February 1971; 13:59	Voskhod 11A57	Reconnaissance	3 March 1971	
Kosmos 397	IS-A	25 February 1971; 11:11	Tsyklon-2 11K69	ASAT test	25 February 1971*	Intercepted and destroyed Kosmos 394
Kosmos 398	LK-T2K	26 February 1971; 05:06	Soyuz-L 11A511L	Uncrewed research test vehicle for Soviet human lunar program.	10 December 1995	Baikonur launch. Orbital inclination 52 degrees. Uncrewed lunar program research, similar to Kosmos 379 and Kosmos 434.
Kosmos 399	Zenit-4M	3 March 1971; 09:30	Voskhod 11A57	Reconnaissance	17 March 1971	
Kosmos 400	DS-P1-M	18 March 1971; 21:45	Kosmos-3M 11K65M	ASAT target	4 April 1971*	DS-P1-M #3, third of five DS-P1-M satellites, intercepted and destroyed by Kosmos 404
Kosmos 401	Zenit-4M	27 March 1971; 10:59	Voskhod 11A57	Reconnaissance	9 April 1971	
Kosmos 402	US-A	1 April 1971; 11:29	Tsyklon-2 11K69	Reconnaissance	6 May 1971	
Kosmos 403	Zenit-2M	2 April 1971; 08:20	Voskhod 11A57	Reconnaissance	14 April 1971	
Kosmos 404	IS-A	4 April 1971; 14:27	Tsyklon-2 11K69	ASAT test	4 April 1971*	Intercepted and destroyed Kosmos 400
Kosmos 405	Tselina-D	7 April 1971; 07:10	Vostok-2M 8A92M	ELINT	3 November 2023	
Kosmos 406	Zenit-4M	14 April 1971; 08:00	Voskhod 11A57	Reconnaissance	24 April 1971	
Kosmos 407	Strela-2	23 April 1971; 11:30	Kosmos-3M 11K65M	Communication	in orbit	
Kosmos 408	DS-P1-Yu	24 April 1971; 11:15	Kosmos-2I 63SM	Radar target	29 December 1971	DS-P1-Yu #37, forty-first of seventy nine DS-P1-Yu satellites
Kosmos 409	Sfera	28 April 1971; 14:35	Kosmos-3M 11K65M	Geodesy	in orbit	
Kosmos 410	Zenit-2M	6 May 1971; 06:20	Voskhod 11A57	Reconnaissance	18 May 1971	
Kosmos 411	Strela-1M	7 May 1971; 14:20	Kosmos-3M 11K65M	Communication	in orbit	
Kosmos 412	Strela-1M	7 May 1971; 14:20	Kosmos-3M 11K65M	Communication	in orbit	
Kosmos 413	Strela-1M	7 May 1971; 14:20	Kosmos-3M 11K65M	Communication	in orbit	
Kosmos 414	Strela-1M	7 May 1971; 14:20	Kosmos-3M 11K65M	Communication	in orbit	
Kosmos 415	Strela-1M	7 May 1971; 14:20	Kosmos-3M 11K65M	Communication	in orbit	
Kosmos 416	Strela-1M	7 May 1971; 14:20	Kosmos-3M 11K65M	Communication	in orbit	
Kosmos 417	Strela-1M	7 May 1971; 14:20	Kosmos-3M 11K65M	Communication	in orbit	
Kosmos 418	Strela-1M	7 May 1971; 14:20	Kosmos-3M 11K65M	Communication	in orbit	
Kosmos 419	3MS	10 May 1971; 16:58	Proton-K/D 8K82K	Mars probe	12 May 1971	Failed to leave Earth orbit for Mars and was given a Kosmos number. Decayed into Earth atmosphere after 2 days.
Kosmos 420	Zenit-4M	18 May 1971; 08:00	Voskhod 11A57	Reconnaissance	29 May 1971	
Kosmos 421	DS-P1-Yu	19 May 1971; 10:20	Kosmos-2I 63SM	Radar target	8 November 1971	DS-P1-Yu #48, forty-second of seventy nine DS-P1-Yu satellites
Kosmos 422	Tsiklon	22 May 1971; 00:51	Kosmos-3M 11K65M	Navigation	in orbit	
Kosmos 423	DS-P1-Yu	27 May 1971; 11:59	Kosmos-2I 63SM	Radar target	26 November 1971	DS-P1-Yu #47, forty-third of seventy nine DS-P1-Yu satellites
Kosmos 424	Zenit-4M	28 May 1971; 10:30	Voskhod 11A57	Reconnaissance	10 June 1971	
Kosmos 425	Tselina-O	29 May 1971; 03:49	Kosmos-3M 11K65M	ELINT	15 January 1980	
Kosmos 426	DS-U2-K	4 June 1971; 18:10	Kosmos-3M 11K65M	Magnetospheric	11 May 2002	DS-U2-K #1, only DS-U2-K satellite
Kosmos 427	Zenit-4MK	11 June 1971; 10:00	Voskhod 11A57	Reconnaissance	23 June 1971	
Kosmos 428	Zenit-2M	24 June 1971; 07:59	Voskhod 11A57	Reconnaissance	6 July 1971	
Kosmos 429	Zenit-4M	20 July 1971; 10:00	Voskhod 11A57	Reconnaissance	2 August 1971	
Kosmos 430	Zenit-4M	23 July 1971; 11:00	Voskhod 11A57	Reconnaissance	5 August 1971	
Kosmos 431	Zenit-2M	30 July 1971; 08:29	Voskhod 11A57	Reconnaissance	11 August 1971	
Kosmos 432	Zenit-4M	5 August 1971; 10:00	Voskhod 11A57	Reconnaissance	18 August 1971	
Kosmos 433	OGCh	8 August 1971; 23:45	R-36O 8K69M	FOBS	9 August 1971	Baikonur launch. Orbit 159 x 259 km. Inclination 49 degrees. FOBS test satellite. Possibly recovered after slightly less than one orbit.
Kosmos 434	LK-T2K	12 August 1971; 05:30	Soyuz-L 11A511L	Uncrewed research test vehicle for USSR human lunar program.	23 August 1981	Baikonur launch. Orbital inclination 52 degrees. Uncrewed lunar program research, similar to Kosmos 379 and Kosmos 398. Kosmos 434 described as 'Experimental lunar cabin'.
Kosmos 435	DS-P1-Yu	27 August 1971; 10:54	Kosmos-2I 63SM	Radar target	28 January 1972	DS-P1-Yu #41, forty-fifth of seventy nine DS-P1-Yu satellites
Kosmos 436	Tselina-O	7 September 1971; 01:15	Kosmos-3M 11K65M	ELINT	4 January 1980	
Kosmos 437	Tselina-O	10 September 1971; 03:37	Kosmos-3M 11K65M	ELINT	29 March 1980	
Kosmos 438	Zenit-4MK	14 September 1971; 13:00	Voskhod 11A57	Reconnaissance	27 September 1971	
Kosmos 439	Zenit-2M	21 September 1971; 12:00	Voskhod 11A57	Reconnaissance	2 October 1971	
Kosmos 440	DS-P1-I	24 September 1971; 10:30	Kosmos-2I 63SM	Radar target	29 October 1972	DS-P1-I #10, eleventh of nineteen DS-P1-I satellites
Kosmos 441	Zenit-4M	28 September 1971; 07:40	Voskhod 11A57	Reconnaissance	10 October 1971	
Kosmos 442	Zenit-4M	29 September 1971; 11:30	Voskhod 11A57	Reconnaissance	12 October 1971	
Kosmos 443	Zenit-2M	7 October 1971; 12:30	Voskhod 11A57	Reconnaissance	19 October 1971	
Kosmos 444	Strela-1M	13 October 1971; 13:41	Kosmos-3M 11K65M	Communication	in orbit	
Kosmos 445	Strela-1M	13 October 1971; 13:41	Kosmos-3M 11K65M	Communication	in orbit	
Kosmos 446	Strela-1M	13 October 1971; 13:41	Kosmos-3M 11K65M	Communication	in orbit	
Kosmos 447	Strela-1M	13 October 1971; 13:41	Kosmos-3M 11K65M	Communication	in orbit	
Kosmos 448	Strela-1M	13 October 1971; 13:41	Kosmos-3M 11K65M	Communication	in orbit	
Kosmos 449	Strela-1M	13 October 1971; 13:41	Kosmos-3M 11K65M	Communication	in orbit	
Kosmos 450	Strela-1M	13 October 1971; 13:41	Kosmos-3M 11K65M	Communication	in orbit	
Kosmos 451	Strela-1M	13 October 1971; 13:41	Kosmos-3M 11K65M	Communication	in orbit	
Kosmos 452	Zenit-4M	14 October 1971; 09:00	Voskhod 11A57	Reconnaissance	27 October 1971	
Kosmos 453	DS-P1-Yu	19 October 1971; 12:40	Kosmos-2I 63SM	Radar target	19 March 1972	DS-P1-Yu #44, forty-sixth of seventy nine DS-P1-Yu satellites
Kosmos 454	Zenit-4M	2 November 1971; 14:25	Voskhod 11A57	Reconnaissance	16 November 1971	
Kosmos 455	DS-P1-Yu	17 November 1971; 11:09	Kosmos-2I 63SM	Radar target	9 April 1972	DS-P1-Yu #54, forty-seventh of seventy nine DS-P1-Yu satellites
Kosmos 456	Zenit-4M	19 November 1971; 12:00	Voskhod 11A57	Reconnaissance	2 December 1971	
Kosmos 457	Sfera	20 November 1971; 18:00	Kosmos-3M 11K65M	Geodesy	in orbit	
Kosmos 458	DS-P1-Yu	29 November 1971; 10:09	Kosmos-2I 63SM	Radar target	20 April 1972	DS-P1-Yu #53, forty-eighth of seventy nine DS-P1-Yu satellites
Kosmos 459	DS-P1-M	29 November 1971; 17:30	Kosmos-3M 11K65M	ASAT target	3 December 1971*	DS-P1-M #5, fourth of five DS-P1-M satellites, intercepted and destroyed by Kosmos 462
Kosmos 460	Tselina-O	30 November 1971; 16:39	Kosmos-3M 11K65M	ELINT	5 March 1980	
Kosmos 461	DS-U2-MT	2 December 1971; 17:30	Kosmos-3M 11K65M	Micrometeroids, Astronomy	21 February 1979	DS-U2-MT #1, only DS-U2-MT satellite
Kosmos 462	IS-A	3 December 1971; 13:19	Tsyklon-2 11K69	ASAT test	3 December 1971*	Intercepted and destroyed Kosmos 459
Kosmos 463	Zenit-4M	6 December 1971; 09:50	Voskhod 11A57	Reconnaissance	11 December 1971	
Kosmos 464	Zenit-4M	10 December 1971; 11:00	Voskhod 11A57	Reconnaissance	16 December 1971	
Kosmos 465	Tsiklon	15 December 1971; 04:31	Kosmos-3M 11K65M	Navigation	in orbit	
Kosmos 466	Zenit-4M	16 December 1971; 09:39	Voskhod 11A57	Reconnaissance	27 December 1971	
Kosmos 467	DS-P1-Yu	17 December 1971; 10:39	Kosmos-2I 63SM	Radar target	18 April 1972	DS-P1-Yu #45, forty-ninth of seventy nine DS-P1-Yu satellites
Kosmos 468	Strela-2	17 December 1971; 13:00	Kosmos-3M 11K65M	Communication	in orbit	
Kosmos 469	US-A	25 December 1971; 11:30	Tsyklon-2 11K69	Reconnaissance	9 February 1972	
Kosmos 470	Zenit-4MT	27 December 1971; 14:04	Soyuz-M 11A511M	Reconnaissance	6 January 1972	
Kosmos 471	Zenit-4M	12 January 1972; 09:59	Voskhod 11A57	Reconnaissance	25 January 1972	
Kosmos 472	DS-P1-Yu	25 January 1972; 11:15	Kosmos-2I 63SM	Radar target	18 August 1972	DS-P1-Yu #52, fiftieth of seventy nine DS-P1-Yu satellites
Kosmos 473	Zenit-2M	3 February 1972; 08:40	Voskhod 11A57	Reconnaissance	15 February 1972	
Kosmos 474	Zenit-4M	16 February 1972; 09:30	Voskhod 11A57	Reconnaissance	29 February 1972	
Kosmos 475	Tsiklon	25 February 1972; 07:52	Kosmos-3M 11K65M	Navigation	in orbit	
Kosmos 476	Tselina-D	1 March 1972; 11:15	Vostok-2M 8A92M	ELINT	25 October 1991	
Kosmos 477	Zenit-2M	4 March 1972; 10:00	Voskhod 11A57	Reconnaissance	16 March 1972	
Kosmos 478	Zenit-4M	15 March 1972; 13:00	Voskhod 11A57	Reconnaissance	28 March 1972	
Kosmos 479	Tselina-O	22 March 1972; 20:30	Kosmos-3M 11K65M	ELINT	13 April 1980	
Kosmos 480	Sfera	25 March 1972; 02:20	Kosmos-3M 11K65M	Geodesy	in orbit	
Kosmos 481	DS-P1-Yu	25 March 1972; 10:39	Kosmos-2I 63SM	Radar target	2 September 1972	DS-P1-Yu #46, fifty-first of seventy nine DS-P1-Yu satellites
Kosmos 482	4V-1	31 March 1972; 04:02	Molniya-M 8K78M	Venus lander	5 May 1981	Intended to be Venera 9 and was launched 4 days after Venera 8. Failed to leave Earth orbit and was given a Kosmos number. Reentered on may 10, at 6:24 +- UTC.
Kosmos 483	Zenit-4M	3 April 1972; 10:15	Voskhod 11A57	Reconnaissance	15 April 1972	
Kosmos 484	Zenit-2M	6 April 1972; 08:00	Voskhod 11A57	Reconnaissance	18 April 1972	
Kosmos 485	DS-P1-Yu	11 April 1972; 11:04	Kosmos-2I 63SM	Radar target	30 August 1972	DS-P1-Yu #58, fifty-second of seventy nine DS-P1-Yu satellites
Kosmos 486	Zenit-4M	14 April 1972; 08:00	Voskhod 11A57	Reconnaissance	27 April 1972	
Kosmos 487	DS-P1-Yu	21 April 1972; 11:59	Kosmos-2I 63SM	Radar target	24 September 1972	DS-P1-Yu #57, fifty-third of seventy nine DS-P1-Yu satellites
Kosmos 488	Zenit-4MK	5 May 1972; 11:20	Voskhod 11A57	Reconnaissance	18 May 1972	
Kosmos 489	Tsiklon	6 May 1972; 11:24	Kosmos-3M 11K65M	Navigation	in orbit	
Kosmos 490	Zenit-2M	17 May 1972; 10:19	Voskhod 11A57	Reconnaissance	29 May 1972	
Kosmos 491	Zenit-4M	25 May 1972; 06:35	Voskhod 11A57	Reconnaissance	8 June 1972	
Kosmos 492	Zenit-4M	9 June 1972; 06:59	Voskhod 11A57	Reconnaissance	22 June 1972	
Kosmos 493	Zenit-2M	21 June 1972; 06:25	Voskhod 11A57	Reconnaissance	3 July 1972	
Kosmos 494	Strela-2	23 June 1972; 09:24	Kosmos-3M 11K65M	Communication	in orbit	
Kosmos 495	Zenit-4M	23 June 1972; 11:19	Voskhod 11A57	Reconnaissance	6 July 1972	
Kosmos 496	Soyuz 7K-T	26 June 1972; 14:53	Soyuz 11A511	Test	2 July 1972	Baikonur launch. Orbit 195 x 343 km. Inclination 51 degrees. Was probably a test of equipment for crewed space flights. Possibly redesigned Soyuz/Salyut hatch.
Kosmos 497	DS-P1-I	30 June 1972; 09:19	Kosmos-2I 63SM	Radar target	7 November 1973	DS-P1-I #12, twelfth of nineteen DS-P1-I satellites
Kosmos 498	DS-P1-Yu	5 July 1972; 09:29	Kosmos-2I 63SM	Radar target	25 November 1972	DS-P1-Yu #56, fifty-fifth of seventy nine DS-P1-Yu satellites
Kosmos 499	Zenit-4M	6 July 1972; 10:40	Voskhod 11A57	Reconnaissance	17 July 1972	
Kosmos 500	Tselina-O	10 July 1972; 16:15	Kosmos-3M 11K65M	ELINT	29 March 1980	

* — satellite was destroyed in orbit rather than decaying and burning up in the Earth's atmosphere

== See also ==
- List of USA satellites
