= List of Tsyklon launches =

This is a list of launches made by the Tsyklon rocket family.

== Launch history ==
Date/time (UTC)	Configuration	Serial number	Launch site	Outcome
Date/time (UTC)	Payload	Separation orbit	Operator	Function
Date/time (UTC)	Remarks			
=== 1965 ===
16 December 1965; 14:09	R-36-O		Baikonur Site 67/21	Successful
16 December 1965; 14:09	FOBS	Suborbital		Orbital bomb
=== 1966 ===
5 February 1966; 12:19	R-36-O		Baikonur Site 67/21	Successful
5 February 1966; 12:19	FOBS	Suborbital		Orbital bomb
5 February 1966; 12:19	Bomb missed target due to retro-rocket malfunction			
15 March 1966; 22:00	R-36-O		Baikonur Site 67/21	Failure
15 March 1966; 22:00	FOBS	Suborbital (planned)		Orbital bomb
15 March 1966; 22:00	Vehicle exploded on pad during fueling operations			
19 May 1966; 19:30	R-36-O		Baikonur Site 67/22	Successful
19 May 1966; 19:30	FOBS	Suborbital		Orbital bomb
17 September 1966; 22:35	R-36-O		Baikonur Site 162/36	Failure
17 September 1966; 22:35	FOBS	Suborbital (planned); Low Earth (reached)		Orbital bomb
17 September 1966; 22:35	Second stage engine failed to shut down as planned and mistakenly entered orbit; bomb self-destructed			
2 November 1966; 00:45	R-36-O		Baikonur Site 162/36	Failure
2 November 1966; 00:45	FOBS	Suborbital (planned); Low Earth (reached)		Orbital bomb
2 November 1966; 00:45	Second stage engine failed to shut down as planned and mistakenly entered orbit; bomb self-destructed			
=== 1967 ===
25 January 1967; 13:55	R-36-O		Baikonur Site 162/36	Successful
25 January 1967; 13:55	Kosmos 139 (FOBS)	Low Earth		Orbital bomb
22 March 1967; 13:55	R-36-O		Baikonur Site 161/35	Failure
22 March 1967; 13:55	FOBS	Low Earth (planned)		Orbital bomb
17 May 1967; 16:05	R-36-O		Baikonur Site 161/35	Successful
17 May 1967; 16:05	Kosmos 160 (FOBS)	Low Earth		Orbital bomb
17 July 1967; 16:45	R-36-O		Baikonur Site 162/36	Successful
17 July 1967; 16:45	Kosmos 169 (FOBS)	Low Earth		Orbital bomb
31 July 1967; 16:45	R-36-O		Baikonur Site 161/35	Successful
31 July 1967; 16:45	Kosmos 170 (FOBS)	Low Earth		Orbital bomb
8 August 1967; 16:05	R-36-O		Baikonur Site 162/36	Successful
8 August 1967; 16:05	Kosmos 171 (FOBS)	Low Earth		Orbital bomb
19 September 1967; 14:45	R-36-O		Baikonur Site 161/35	Successful
19 September 1967; 14:45	Kosmos 178 (FOBS)	Low Earth		Orbital bomb
22 September 1967; 14:05	R-36-O		Baikonur Site 162/36	Successful
22 September 1967; 14:05	Kosmos 179 (FOBS)	Low Earth		Orbital bomb
18 October 1967; 13:30	R-36-O		Baikonur Site 161/35	Successful
18 October 1967; 13:30	Kosmos 183 (FOBS)	Low Earth		Orbital bomb
27 October 1967; 02:21	Tsyklon-2A		Baikonur Site 90/19	Successful
27 October 1967; 02:21	Kosmos 185 (I2-BM)	Low Earth		Anti-satellite weapon test
28 October 1967; 13:15	R-36-O		Baikonur Site 162/36	Successful
28 October 1967; 13:15	Kosmos 187 (FOBS)	Low Earth		Orbital bomb
27 December 1967; 11:28	Tsyklon-2A		Baikonur Site 90/19	Successful
27 December 1967; 11:28	Kosmos 198 (US-A)	Low Earth		Ocean surveillance
=== 1968 ===
22 March 1968; 09:30	Tsyklon-2A		Baikonur Site 90/19	Successful
22 March 1968; 09:30	Kosmos 209 (US-A)	Low Earth		Ocean surveillance
24 April 1968; 16:00	Tsyklon-2A		Baikonur Site 90/20	Partial Failure
24 April 1968; 16:00	Kosmos 217 (I2M)	Low Earth		Anti-satellite weapon test target
24 April 1968; 16:00	Spacecraft failed to separate from 2nd stage			
25 April 1968; 00:45	R-36-O		Baikonur Site 162/36	Successful
25 April 1968; 00:45	Kosmos 218 (FOBS)	Low Earth		Orbital bomb
20 May 1968; 22:05	R-36-O		Baikonur Site 162/36	Successful
20 May 1968; 22:05	FOBS	Suborbital		Orbital bomb
27 May 1968; 23:15	R-36-O		Baikonur Site 161/35	Successful
27 May 1968; 23:15	FOBS	Suborbital		Orbital bomb
2 October 1968; 13:35	R-36-O		Baikonur Site 161/35	Successful
2 October 1968; 13:35	Kosmos 244 (FOBS)	Low Earth		Orbital bomb
19 October 1968; 04:20	Tsyklon-2A		Baikonur Site 90/19	Successful
19 October 1968; 04:20	Kosmos 248 (I2M)	Low Earth		Anti-satellite weapon test target
20 October 1968; 04:02	Tsyklon-2A		Baikonur Site 90/20	Successful
20 October 1968; 04:02	Kosmos 249 (I2P)	Low Earth		Anti-satellite weapon test
1 November 1968; 00:27	Tsyklon-2A		Baikonur Site 90/20	Successful
1 November 1968; 00:27	Kosmos 252 (I2P)	Low Earth		Anti-satellite weapon test
=== 1969 ===
25 January 1969; 11:14	Tsyklon-2A		Baikonur Site 90/19	Failure
25 January 1969; 11:14	US-A	Low Earth (planned)		Ocean surveillance
6 August 1969; 05:40	Tsyklon-2		Baikonur Site 90/19	Successful
6 August 1969; 05:40	Kosmos 291 (IS Mass Model)	Low Earth		Test flight
15 September 1969; 16:00	R-36-O		Baikonur Site 191/66	Successful
15 September 1969; 16:00	Kosmos 298 (FOBS)	Low Earth		Orbital bomb
1 November 1969; 10:59	Tsyklon-2		Baikonur Site 90/20	Successful
1 November 1969; 10:59	IS Mass Model	Suborbital		Test flight
23 December 1969; 09:25	Tsyklon-2		Baikonur Site 90/20	Successful
23 December 1969; 09:25	Kosmos 316 (IS Mass Model)	Low Earth		Test flight
=== 1970 ===
28 July 1970; 22:00	R-36-O		Baikonur Site 191/66	Successful
28 July 1970; 22:00	Kosmos 354 (FOBS)	Low Earth		Orbital bomb
25 September 1970; 14:05	R-36-O		Baikonur Site 191/66	Successful
25 September 1970; 14:05	Kosmos 365 (FOBS)	Low Earth		Orbital bomb
3 October 1970; 10:26	Tsyklon-2		Baikonur Site 90/19	Successful
3 October 1970; 10:26	Kosmos 367 (US-A)	Low Earth		Ocean surveillance
20 October 1970; 05:38	Tsyklon-2		Baikonur Site 90/19	Successful
20 October 1970; 05:38	Kosmos 373 (I2M)	Low Earth		Anti-satellite weapon test target
23 October 1970; 04:42	Tsyklon-2		Baikonur Site 90/20	Successful
23 October 1970; 04:42	Kosmos 374 (I2P)	Low Earth		Anti-satellite weapon test
30 October 1970; 02:36	Tsyklon-2		Baikonur Site 90/20	Successful
30 October 1970; 02:36	Kosmos 375 (I2P)	Low Earth		Anti-satellite weapon test
=== 1971 ===
25 February 1971; 11:11	Tsyklon-2		Baikonur Site 90/20	Successful
25 February 1971; 11:11	Kosmos 397 (I2P)	Low Earth		Anti-satellite weapon test
1 April 1971; 11:30	Tsyklon-2		Baikonur Site 90/19	Successful
1 April 1971; 11:30	Kosmos 402 (US-A)	Low Earth		Ocean surveillance
4 April 1971; 14:27	Tsyklon-2		Baikonur Site 90/20	Successful
4 April 1971; 14:27	Kosmos 404 (I2P)	Low Earth		Anti-satellite weapon test
8 August 1971; 23:45	R-36-O		Baikonur Site 191/66	Successful
8 August 1971; 23:45	Kosmos 433 (FOBS)	Low Earth		Orbital bomb
3 December 1971; 13:19	Tsyklon-2		Baikonur Site 90/20	Successful
3 December 1971; 13:19	Kosmos 462 (I2P)	Low Earth		Anti-satellite weapon test
25 December 1971; 11:30	Tsyklon-2		Baikonur Site 90/19	Successful
25 December 1971; 11:30	Kosmos 469 (US-A)	Low Earth		Ocean surveillance
=== 1972 ===
21 August 1972; 10:36	Tsyklon-2		Baikonur Site 90/19	Successful
21 August 1972; 10:36	Kosmos 516 (US-A)	Low Earth		Ocean surveillance
=== 1973 ===
25 April 1973; 09:10	Tsyklon-2		Baikonur Site 90/19	Failure
25 April 1973; 09:10	US-A	Low Earth (planned)		Ocean surveillance
27 December 1973; 20:20	Tsyklon-2		Baikonur Site 90/19	Successful
27 December 1973; 20:20	Kosmos 626 (US-A)	Low Earth		Ocean surveillance
=== 1974 ===
15 May 1974; 07:30	Tsyklon-2		Baikonur Site 90/19	Successful
15 May 1974; 07:30	Kosmos 651 (US-A)	Low Earth		Ocean surveillance
17 May 1974; 06:53	Tsyklon-2		Baikonur Site 90/19	Successful
17 May 1974; 06:53	Kosmos 654 (US-A)	Low Earth		Ocean surveillance
24 December 1974; 11:00	Tsyklon-2		Baikonur Site 90/20	Successful
24 December 1974; 11:00	Kosmos 699 (US-P)	Low Earth		Ocean surveillance
=== 1975 ===
2 April 1975; 11:00	Tsyklon-2		Baikonur Site 90/20	Successful
2 April 1975; 11:00	Kosmos 723 (US-A)	Low Earth		Ocean surveillance
7 April 1975; 11:00	Tsyklon-2		Baikonur Site 90/20	Successful
7 April 1975; 11:00	Kosmos 724 (US-A)	Low Earth		Ocean surveillance
29 October 1975; 11:00	Tsyklon-2		Baikonur Site 90/19	Successful
29 October 1975; 11:00	Kosmos 777 (US-P)	Low Earth		Ocean surveillance
12 December 1975; 12:45	Tsyklon-2		Baikonur Site 90/19	Successful
12 December 1975; 12:45	Kosmos 785 (US-A)	Low Earth		Ocean surveillance
=== 1976 ===
16 February 1976; 08:29	Tsyklon-2		Baikonur Site 90/20	Successful
16 February 1976; 08:29	Kosmos 804 (IS-A)	Low Earth		Anti-satellite weapon test
13 April 1976; 17:15	Tsyklon-2		Baikonur Site 90/20	Successful
13 April 1976; 17:15	Kosmos 814 (IS-A)	Low Earth		Anti-satellite weapon test
2 July 1976; 10:30	Tsyklon-2		Baikonur Site 90/19	Successful
2 July 1976; 10:30	Kosmos 838 (US-P)	Low Earth		Ocean surveillance
21 July 1976; 15:14	Tsyklon-2		Baikonur Site 90/19	Successful
21 July 1976; 15:14	Kosmos 843 (IS-A)	Low Earth		Anti-satellite weapon test
17 October 1976; 18:06	Tsyklon-2		Baikonur Site 90/19	Successful
17 October 1976; 18:06	Kosmos 860 (US-A)	Low Earth		Ocean surveillance
21 October 1976; 16:53	Tsyklon-2		Baikonur Site 90/19	Successful
21 October 1976; 16:53	Kosmos 861 (US-A)	Low Earth		Ocean surveillance
26 November 1976; 14:30	Tsyklon-2		Baikonur Site 90/20	Successful
26 November 1976; 14:30	Kosmos 868 (US-P)	Low Earth		Ocean surveillance
27 December 1976; 12:05	Tsyklon-2		Baikonur Site 90/19	Successful
27 December 1976; 12:05	Kosmos 886 (IS-A)	Low Earth		Anti-satellite weapon test
=== 1977 ===
23 May 1977; 12:14	Tsyklon-2		Baikonur Site 90/20	Successful
23 May 1977; 12:14	Kosmos 910 (IS-A)	Low Earth		Anti-satellite weapon test
17 June 1977; 07:23	Tsyklon-2		Baikonur Site 90/20	Successful
17 June 1977; 07:23	Kosmos 918 (IS-A)	Low Earth		Anti-satellite weapon test
24 June 1977; 10:30	Tsyklon-3		Plesetsk Site 32/2	Successful
24 June 1977; 10:30	Kosmos 921 (EPN 03.0380 / Tselina-D Mass Model)	Low Earth		Test flight
24 August 1977; 07:07	Tsyklon-2		Baikonur Site 90/20	Successful
24 August 1977; 07:07	Kosmos 937 (US-P)	Low Earth		Ocean surveillance
16 September 1977; 14:25	Tsyklon-2		Baikonur Site 90/20	Successful
16 September 1977; 14:25	Kosmos 952 (US-A)	Low Earth		Ocean surveillance
18 September 1977; 13:48	Tsyklon-2		Baikonur Site 90/20	Successful
18 September 1977; 13:48	Kosmos 954 (US-A)	Low Earth		Ocean surveillance
18 September 1977; 13:48	Spacecraft lost control in November 1977 and subsequently re-entered over Canada on 24 January 1978 with nuclear reactor on board			
24 September 1977; 10:15	Tsyklon-3		Plesetsk Site 32/2	Successful
24 September 1977; 10:15	Kosmos 956 (EPN 03.0380 / Tselina-D Mass Model)	Low Earth		Test flight
26 October 1977; 05:14	Tsyklon-2		Baikonur Site 90/20	Successful
26 October 1977; 05:14	Kosmos 961 (IS-A)	Low Earth		Anti-satellite weapon test
21 December 1977; 10:35	Tsyklon-2		Baikonur Site 90/20	Successful
21 December 1977; 10:35	Kosmos 970 (IS-A)	Low Earth		Anti-satellite weapon test
27 December 1977; 08:00	Tsyklon-3		Plesetsk Site 32/2	Successful
27 December 1977; 08:00	Kosmos 972 (EPN 03.0380 / Tselina-D Mass Model)	Low Earth		Test flight
=== 1978 ===
19 May 1978; 00:21	Tsyklon-2		Baikonur Site 90/19	Successful
19 May 1978; 00:21	Kosmos 1009 (IS-A)	Low Earth		Anti-satellite weapon test
28 June 1978; 17:35	Tsyklon-3		Plesetsk Site 32/2	Successful
28 June 1978; 17:35	Kosmos 1025 (Tselina-D)	Low Earth		ELINT
26 October 1978; 07:00	Tsyklon-3		Plesetsk Site 32/2	Successful
26 October 1978; 07:00	Kosmos 1045 (Meteor-2 Mass Model); Radio Sputnik 1 Radio Sputnik 2	Low Earth		Test flight/Amateur Radio
=== 1979 ===
12 February 1979; 13:00	Tsyklon-3		Plesetsk Site 32/2	Successful
12 February 1979; 13:00	Kosmos 1076 (Okean-E)	Low Earth		Ocean observation
18 April 1979; 12:00	Tsyklon-2		Baikonur Site 90/19	Successful
18 April 1979; 12:00	Kosmos 1094 (US-P)	Low Earth		Ocean surveillance
25 April 1979; 10:00	Tsyklon-2		Baikonur Site 90/19	Successful
25 April 1979; 10:00	Kosmos 1096 (US-P)	Low Earth		Ocean surveillance
=== 1980 ===
23 January 1980; 07:00	Tsyklon-3		Plesetsk Site 32/1	Successful
23 January 1980; 07:00	Kosmos 1151 (Okean-E)	Low Earth		Ocean observation
14 March 1980; 10:40	Tsyklon-2		Baikonur Site 90/20	Successful
14 March 1980; 10:40	Kosmos 1167 (US-P)	Low Earth		Ocean surveillance
18 April 1980; 00:51	Tsyklon-2		Baikonur Site 90/20	Successful
18 April 1980; 00:51	Kosmos 1174 (IS-A)	Low Earth		Anti-satellite weapon test
29 April 1980; 11:40	Tsyklon-2		Baikonur Site 90/20	Successful
29 April 1980; 11:40	Kosmos 1176 (US-A)	Low Earth		Ocean surveillance
4 November 1980; 15:04	Tsyklon-2		Baikonur Site 90/20	Successful
4 November 1980; 15:04	Kosmos 1220 (US-P)	Low Earth		Ocean surveillance
=== 1981 ===
23 January 1981; 11:20	Tsyklon-3		Plesetsk Site 32/1	Failure
23 January 1981; 11:20	GEO-IK	Low Earth (planned)		Geodesy
2 February 1981; 02:19	Tsyklon-2		Baikonur Site 90/20	Successful
2 February 1981; 02:19	Kosmos 1243 (IS-A)	Low Earth		Anti-satellite weapon test
5 March 1981; 18:09	Tsyklon-2		Baikonur Site 90/19	Successful
5 March 1981; 18:09	Kosmos 1249 (US-A)	Low Earth		Ocean surveillance
14 March 1981; 16:55	Tsyklon-2		Baikonur Site 90/20	Successful
14 March 1981; 16:55	Kosmos 1258 (IS-A)	Low Earth		Anti-satellite weapon test
20 March 1981; 23:45	Tsyklon-2		Baikonur Site 90/19	Successful
20 March 1981; 23:45	Kosmos 1260 (US-P)	Low Earth		Ocean surveillance
21 April 1981; 03:45	Tsyklon-2		Baikonur Site 90/20	Successful
21 April 1981; 03:45	Kosmos 1266 (US-A)	Low Earth		Ocean surveillance
4 August 1981; 08:28	Tsyklon-2		Baikonur Site 90/19	Successful
4 August 1981; 08:28	Kosmos 1286 (US-P)	Low Earth		Ocean surveillance
24 August 1981; 16:37	Tsyklon-2		Baikonur Site 90/20	Successful
24 August 1981; 16:37	Kosmos 1299 (US-A)	Low Earth		Ocean surveillance
24 August 1981; 21:40	Tsyklon-3		Plesetsk Site 32/1	Successful
24 August 1981; 21:40	Kosmos 1300 (Tselina-D)	Low Earth		ELINT
14 September 1981; 20:31	Tsyklon-2		Baikonur Site 90/19	Successful
14 September 1981; 20:31	Kosmos 1306 (US-P)	Low Earth		Ocean surveillance
21 September 1981; 13:10	Tsyklon-3		Plesetsk Site 32/1	Successful
21 September 1981; 13:10	Aureole 3	Low Earth		Magnetosphere research
30 September 1981; 08:00	Tsyklon-3		Plesetsk Site 32/1	Successful
30 September 1981; 08:00	Kosmos 1312 (GEO-IK)	Low Earth		Geodesy
3 December 1981; 11:47	Tsyklon-3		Plesetsk Site 32/1	Successful
3 December 1981; 11:47	Kosmos 1328 (Tselina-D)	Low Earth		ELINT
=== 1982 ===
11 February 1982; 01:11	Tsyklon-2		Baikonur Site 90/19	Successful
11 February 1982; 01:11	Kosmos 1337 (US-P)	Low Earth		Ocean surveillance
25 March 1982; 09:50	Tsyklon-3		Plesetsk Site 32/1	Successful
25 March 1982; 09:50	Meteor-2 8	Low Earth		Meteorology
29 April 1982; 09:55	Tsyklon-2		Baikonur Site 90/20	Successful
29 April 1982; 09:55	Kosmos 1355 (US-P)	Low Earth		Ocean surveillance
14 May 1982; 19:39	Tsyklon-2		Baikonur Site 90/20	Successful
14 May 1982; 19:39	Kosmos 1365 (US-A)	Low Earth		Ocean surveillance
1 June 1982; 13:58	Tsyklon-2		Baikonur Site 90/20	Successful
1 June 1982; 13:58	Kosmos 1372 (US-A)	Low Earth		Ocean surveillance
10 June 1982; 17:37	Tsyklon-3		Plesetsk Site 32/1	Successful
10 June 1982; 17:37	Kosmos 1378 (Tselina-D)	Low Earth		ELINT
18 June 1982; 11:04	Tsyklon-2		Baikonur Site 90/19	Successful
18 June 1982; 11:04	Kosmos 1379 (IS-A)	Low Earth		Anti-satellite weapon test
30 August 1982; 10:06	Tsyklon-2		Baikonur Site 90/19	Successful
30 August 1982; 10:06	Kosmos 1402 (US-A)	Low Earth		Ocean surveillance
30 August 1982; 10:06	Spacecraft lost control in December 1982 and subsequently re-entered atmosphere January–February 1983 with nuclear reactor on board			
4 September 1982; 17:50	Tsyklon-2		Baikonur Site 90/20	Successful
4 September 1982; 17:50	Kosmos 1405 (US-P)	Low Earth		Ocean surveillance
16 September 1982; 04:55	Tsyklon-3		Plesetsk Site 32/2	Successful
16 September 1982; 04:55	Kosmos 1408 (Tselina-D)	Low Earth		ELINT
16 September 1982; 04:55	Spacecraft destroyed in Russian anti-satellite weapon test on 15 November 2021			
24 September 1982; 09:15	Tsyklon-3		Plesetsk Site 32/1	Successful
24 September 1982; 09:15	Kosmos 1410 (GEO-IK)	Low Earth		Geodesy
2 October 1982; 00:01	Tsyklon-2		Baikonur Site 90/20	Successful
2 October 1982; 00:01	Kosmos 1412 (US-A)	Low Earth		Ocean surveillance
=== 1983 ===
23 April 1983; 14:30	Tsyklon-3		Plesetsk Site 32/2	Successful
23 April 1983; 14:30	Kosmos 1455 (Tselina-D)	Low Earth		ELINT
7 May 1983; 10:30	Tsyklon-2		Baikonur Site 90/19	Successful
7 May 1983; 10:30	Kosmos 1461 (US-P)	Low Earth		Ocean surveillance
22 June 1983; 23:58	Tsyklon-3		Plesetsk Site 32/2	Successful
22 June 1983; 23:58	Kosmos 1470 (Tselina-D)	Low Earth		ELINT
28 September 1983; 07:59	Tsyklon-3		Plesetsk Site 32/1	Successful
28 September 1983; 07:59	Kosmos 1500 (Okean-OE)	Low Earth		Ocean observation
29 October 1983; 08:30	Tsyklon-2		Baikonur Site 90/20	Successful
29 October 1983; 08:30	Kosmos 1507 (US-P)	Low Earth		Ocean surveillance
24 November 1983; 12:33	Tsyklon-3		Plesetsk Site 32/2	Successful
24 November 1983; 12:33	Kosmos 1510 (GEO-IK)	Low Earth		Geodesy
15 December 1983; 12:25	Tsyklon-3		Plesetsk Site 32/2	Successful
15 December 1983; 12:25	Kosmos 1515 (Tselina-D)	Low Earth		ELINT
=== 1984 ===
8 February 1984; 09:23	Tsyklon-3		Plesetsk Site 32/2	Successful
8 February 1984; 09:23	Kosmos 1536 (Tselina-D)	Low Earth		ELINT
15 March 1984; 17:05	Tsyklon-3		Plesetsk Site 32/2	Successful
15 March 1984; 17:05	Kosmos 1544 (Tselina-D)	Low Earth		ELINT
30 May 1984; 18:46	Tsyklon-2		Baikonur Site 90/20	Successful
30 May 1984; 18:46	Kosmos 1567 (US-P)	Low Earth		Ocean surveillance
29 June 1984; 00:21	Tsyklon-2		Baikonur Site 90/19	Successful
29 June 1984; 00:21	Kosmos 1579 (US-A)	Low Earth		Ocean surveillance
5 July 1984; 03:35	Tsyklon-3		Plesetsk Site 32/2	Successful
5 July 1984; 03:35	Meteor-2 11	Low Earth		Meteorology
7 August 1984; 22:50	Tsyklon-2		Baikonur Site 90/20	Successful
7 August 1984; 22:50	Kosmos 1588 (US-P)	Low Earth		Ocean surveillance
8 August 1984; 12:08	Tsyklon-3		Plesetsk Site 32/2	Successful
8 August 1984; 12:08	Kosmos 1589 (GEO-IK)	Low Earth		Geodesy
28 September 1984; 06:00	Tsyklon-3		Plesetsk Site 32/2	Successful
28 September 1984; 06:00	Kosmos 1602 (Okean-OE)	Low Earth		Ocean observation
18 October 1984; 17:46	Tsyklon-3		Plesetsk Site 32/2	Successful
18 October 1984; 17:46	Kosmos 1606 (Tselina-D)	Low Earth		ELINT
31 October 1984; 12:29	Tsyklon-2		Baikonur Site 90/20	Successful
31 October 1984; 12:29	Kosmos 1607 (US-A)	Low Earth		Ocean surveillance
27 November 1984; 14:22	Tsyklon-3		Plesetsk Site 32/1	Partial Failure
27 November 1984; 14:22	Kosmos 1612 (Meteor-3)	Low Earth		Meteorology
27 November 1984; 14:22	Satellite left in unusable orbit due to third stage attitude control failure at re-ignition			
=== 1985 ===
15 January 1985; 14:51	Tsyklon-3		Plesetsk Site 32/1	Successful
15 January 1985; 14:51	Kosmos 1617 (Strela-3); Kosmos 1618 (Strela-3); Kosmos 1619 (Strela-3); Kosmos 1620 (Strela-3); Kosmos 1621 (Strela-3); Kosmos 1622 (Strela-3)	Low Earth		Communication
23 January 1985; 19:58	Tsyklon-2		Baikonur Site 90/19	Successful
23 January 1985; 19:58	Kosmos 1625 (US-P)	Low Earth		Ocean surveillance
24 January 1985; 16:45	Tsyklon-3		Plesetsk Site 32/2	Successful
24 January 1985; 16:45	Kosmos 1626 (Tselina-D)	Low Earth		ELINT
6 February 1985; 21:45	Tsyklon-3		Plesetsk Site 32/1	Successful
6 February 1985; 21:45	Meteor-2 12	Low Earth		Meteorology
5 March 1985; 15:39	Tsyklon-3		Plesetsk Site 32/2	Successful
5 March 1985; 15:39	Kosmos 1633 (Tselina-D)	Low Earth		ELINT
18 April 1985; 21:40	Tsyklon-2		Baikonur Site 90/20	Successful
18 April 1985; 21:40	Kosmos 1646 (US-P)	Low Earth		Ocean surveillance
14 June 1985; 10:36	Tsyklon-3		Plesetsk Site 32/1	Successful
14 June 1985; 10:36	Kosmos 1660 (GEO-IK)	Low Earth		Geodesy
8 July 1985; 23:40	Tsyklon-3		Plesetsk Site 32/2	Successful
8 July 1985; 23:40	Kosmos 1666 (Tselina-D)	Low Earth		ELINT
1 August 1985; 05:36	Tsyklon-2		Baikonur Site 90/19	Successful
1 August 1985; 05:36	Kosmos 1670 (US-A)	Low Earth		Ocean surveillance
8 August 1985; 11:49	Tsyklon-3		Plesetsk Site 32/1	Successful
8 August 1985; 11:49	Kosmos 1674 (Tselina-D)	Low Earth		ELINT
23 August 1985; 22:33	Tsyklon-2		Baikonur Site 90/19	Successful
23 August 1985; 22:33	Kosmos 1677 (US-A)	Low Earth		Ocean surveillance
19 September 1985; 01:32	Tsyklon-2		Baikonur Site 90/20	Successful
19 September 1985; 01:32	Kosmos 1682 (US-P)	Low Earth		Ocean surveillance
9 October 1985; 21:35	Tsyklon-3		Plesetsk Site 32/1	Successful
9 October 1985; 21:35	Kosmos 1690 (Strela-3); Kosmos 1691 (Strela-3); Kosmos 1692 (Strela-3); Kosmos 1693 (Strela-3); Kosmos 1694 (Strela-3); Kosmos 1695 (Strela-3)	Low Earth		Communication
24 October 1985; 02:30	Tsyklon-3		Plesetsk Site 32/1	Successful
24 October 1985; 02:30	Meteor-3 1	Low Earth		Meteorology
22 November 1985; 22:20	Tsyklon-3		Plesetsk Site 32/2	Successful
22 November 1985; 22:20	Kosmos 1703 (Tselina-D)	Low Earth		ELINT
12 December 1985; 15:51	Tsyklon-3		Plesetsk Site 32/1	Successful
12 December 1985; 15:51	Kosmos 1707 (Tselina-D)	Low Earth		ELINT
26 December 1985; 01:50	Tsyklon-3		Plesetsk Site 32/1	Successful
26 December 1985; 01:50	Meteor-2 13	Low Earth		Meteorology
=== 1986 ===
17 January 1986; 07:21	Tsyklon-3		Plesetsk Site 32/1	Successful
17 January 1986; 07:21	Kosmos 1726 (Tselina-D)	Low Earth		ELINT
11 February 1986; 06:56	Tsyklon-3		Plesetsk Site 32/2	Successful
11 February 1986; 06:56	Kosmos 1732 (GEO-IK)	Low Earth		Geodesy
19 February 1986; 23:04	Tsyklon-3		Plesetsk Site 32/1	Successful
19 February 1986; 23:04	Kosmos 1733 (Tselina-D)	Low Earth		ELINT
27 February 1986; 01:44	Tsyklon-2		Baikonur Site 90/19	Successful
27 February 1986; 01:44	Kosmos 1735 (US-P)	Low Earth		Ocean surveillance
21 March 1986; 10:05	Tsyklon-2		Baikonur Site 90/20	Successful
21 March 1986; 10:05	Kosmos 1736 (US-A)	Low Earth		Ocean surveillance
25 March 1986; 19:26	Tsyklon-2		Baikonur Site 90/19	Successful
25 March 1986; 19:26	Kosmos 1737 (US-P)	Low Earth		Ocean surveillance
15 May 1986; 04:26	Tsyklon-3		Plesetsk Site 32/1	Successful
15 May 1986; 04:26	Kosmos 1743 (Tselina-D)	Low Earth		ELINT
27 May 1986; 09:30	Tsyklon-3		Plesetsk Site 32/1	Successful
27 May 1986; 09:30	Meteor-2 14	Low Earth		Meteorology
12 June 1986; 04:43	Tsyklon-3		Plesetsk Site 32/1	Successful
12 June 1986; 04:43	Kosmos 1758 (Tselina-D)	Low Earth		ELINT
28 July 1986; 21:08	Tsyklon-3		Plesetsk Site 32/2	Successful
28 July 1986; 21:08	Kosmos 1766 (Okean-O1)	Low Earth		Ocean observation
4 August 1986; 05:08	Tsyklon-2		Baikonur Site 90/20	Successful
4 August 1986; 05:08	Kosmos 1769 (US-P)	Low Earth		Ocean surveillance
20 August 1986; 12:58	Tsyklon-2		Baikonur Site 90/20	Successful
20 August 1986; 12:58	Kosmos 1771 (US-A)	Low Earth		Ocean surveillance
30 September 1986; 18:34	Tsyklon-3		Plesetsk Site 32/1	Successful
30 September 1986; 18:34	Kosmos 1782 (Tselina-D)	Low Earth		ELINT
15 October 1986; 05:24	Tsyklon-3		Plesetsk Site 32/2	Failure
15 October 1986; 05:24	Strela-3 x 6	Low Earth (planned)		Communication
2 December 1986; 07:00	Tsyklon-3		Plesetsk Site 32/1	Successful
2 December 1986; 07:00	Kosmos 1803 (GEO-IK)	Low Earth		Geodesy
10 December 1986; 07:30	Tsyklon-3		Plesetsk Site 32/2	Successful
10 December 1986; 07:30	Kosmos 1805 (Tselina-R)	Low Earth		ELINT
18 December 1986; 08:00	Tsyklon-3		Plesetsk Site 32/2	Successful
18 December 1986; 08:00	Kosmos 1809 (Ionozond-E)	Low Earth		Ionosphere research
=== 1987 ===
5 January 1987; 01:20	Tsyklon-3		Plesetsk Site 32/2	Successful
5 January 1987; 01:20	Meteor-2 15	Low Earth		Meteorology
14 January 1987; 09:05	Tsyklon-3		Plesetsk Site 32/2	Successful
14 January 1987; 09:05	Kosmos 1812 (Tselina-D)	Low Earth		ELINT
1 February 1987; 23:30	Tsyklon-2		Baikonur Site 90/20	Successful
1 February 1987; 23:30	Kosmos 1818 (US-A/Plazma-A)	Low Earth		Ocean surveillance/Technology
20 February 1987; 04:43	Tsyklon-3		Plesetsk Site 32/2	Successful
20 February 1987; 04:43	Kosmos 1823 (GEO-IK)	Low Earth		Geodesy
3 March 1987; 15:03	Tsyklon-3		Plesetsk Site 32/2	Successful
3 March 1987; 15:03	Kosmos 1825 (Tselina-D)	Low Earth		ELINT
13 March 1987; 13:11	Tsyklon-3		Plesetsk Site 32/2	Successful
13 March 1987; 13:11	Kosmos 1827 (Strela-3); Kosmos 1828 (Strela-3); Kosmos 1829 (Strela-3); Kosmos 1830 (Strela-3); Kosmos 1831 (Strela-3); Kosmos 1832 (Strela-3)	Low Earth		Communication
8 April 1987; 03:51	Tsyklon-2		Baikonur Site 90/19	Successful
8 April 1987; 03:51	Kosmos 1834 (US-P)	Low Earth		Ocean surveillance
27 April 1987; 00:00	Tsyklon-3		Plesetsk Site 32/2	Successful
27 April 1987; 00:00	Kosmos 1842 (Tselina-D)	Low Earth		ELINT
18 June 1987; 21:33	Tsyklon-2		Baikonur Site 90/19	Successful
18 June 1987; 21:33	Kosmos 1860 (US-A)	Low Earth		Ocean surveillance
1 July 1987; 19:35	Tsyklon-3		Plesetsk Site 32/2	Successful
1 July 1987; 19:35	Kosmos 1862 (Tselina-D)	Low Earth		ELINT
10 July 1987; 15:35	Tsyklon-2		Baikonur Site 90/20	Successful
10 July 1987; 15:35	Kosmos 1867 (US-A/Plazma-A)	Low Earth		Ocean surveillance/Technology
16 July 1987; 04:25	Tsyklon-3		Plesetsk Site 32/2	Successful
16 July 1987; 04:25	Kosmos 1869 (Okean-O1)	Low Earth		Ocean observation
18 August 1987; 02:27	Tsyklon-3		Plesetsk Site 32/1	Successful
18 August 1987; 02:27	Meteor-2 16	Low Earth		Meteorology
7 September 1987; 23:50	Tsyklon-3		Plesetsk Site 32/1	Successful
7 September 1987; 23:50	Kosmos 1875 (Strela-3); Kosmos 1876 (Strela-3); Kosmos 1877 (Strela-3); Kosmos 1878 (Strela-3); Kosmos 1879 (Strela-3); Kosmos 1880 (Strela-3)	Low Earth		Communication
10 October 1987; 21:48	Tsyklon-2		Baikonur Site 90/19	Successful
10 October 1987; 21:48	Kosmos 1890 (US-P)	Low Earth		Ocean surveillance
20 October 1987; 09:09	Tsyklon-3		Plesetsk Site 32/1	Successful
20 October 1987; 09:09	Kosmos 1892 (Tselina-D)	Low Earth		ELINT
12 December 1987; 05:40	Tsyklon-2		Baikonur Site 90/20	Successful
12 December 1987; 05:40	Kosmos 1900 (US-A)	Low Earth		Ocean surveillance
=== 1988 ===
6 January 1988; 07:41	Tsyklon-3		Plesetsk Site 32/2	Successful
6 January 1988; 07:41	Kosmos 1908 (Tselina-D)	Low Earth		ELINT
15 January 1988; 03:49	Tsyklon-3		Plesetsk Site 32/1	Successful
15 January 1988; 03:49	Kosmos 1909 (Strela-3); Kosmos 1910 (Strela-3); Kosmos 1911 (Strela-3); Kosmos 1912 (Strela-3); Kosmos 1913 (Strela-3); Kosmos 1914 (Strela-3)	Low Earth		Communication
30 January 1988; 11:00	Tsyklon-3		Plesetsk Site 32/1	Successful
30 January 1988; 11:00	Meteor-2 17	Low Earth		Meteorology
14 March 1988; 14:21	Tsyklon-2		Baikonur Site 90/19	Successful
14 March 1988; 14:21	Kosmos 1932 (US-A)	Low Earth		Ocean surveillance
15 March 1988; 18:50	Tsyklon-3		Plesetsk Site 32/2	Successful
15 March 1988; 18:50	Kosmos 1933 (Tselina-D)	Low Earth		ELINT
28 May 1988; 02:49	Tsyklon-2		Baikonur Site 90/19	Successful
28 May 1988; 02:49	Kosmos 1949 (US-P)	Low Earth		Ocean surveillance
30 May 1988; 08:00	Tsyklon-3		Plesetsk Site 32/1	Successful
30 May 1988; 08:00	Kosmos 1950 (GEO-IK)	Low Earth		Geodesy
14 June 1988; 03:18	Tsyklon-3		Plesetsk Site 32/2	Successful
14 June 1988; 03:18	Kosmos 1953 (Tselina-D)	Low Earth		ELINT
5 July 1988; 09:45	Tsyklon-3		Plesetsk Site 32/1	Successful
5 July 1988; 09:45	Okean 1 (Okean-O1)	Low Earth		Ocean observation
26 July 1988; 05:01	Tsyklon-3		Plesetsk Site 32/2	Successful
26 July 1988; 05:01	Meteor-3 2	Low Earth		Meteorology
11 October 1988; 08:02	Tsyklon-3		Plesetsk Site 32/1	Successful
11 October 1988; 08:02	Kosmos 1975 (Tselina-D)	Low Earth		ELINT
18 November 1988; 00:12	Tsyklon-2		Baikonur Site 90/19	Successful
18 November 1988; 00:12	Kosmos 1979 (US-P)	Low Earth		Ocean surveillance
23 December 1988; 07:20	Tsyklon-3		Plesetsk Site 32/1	Successful
23 December 1988; 07:20	Kosmos 1985 (Koltso)	Low Earth		Radar calibration
=== 1989 ===
10 February 1989; 15:13	Tsyklon-3		Plesetsk Site 32/1	Successful
10 February 1989; 15:13	Kosmos 1994 (Strela-3); Kosmos 1995 (Strela-3); Kosmos 1996 (Strela-3); Kosmos 1997 (Strela-3); Kosmos 1998 (Strela-3); Kosmos 1999 (Strela-3)	Low Earth		Communication
28 February 1989; 04:05	Tsyklon-3		Plesetsk Site 32/2	Successful
28 February 1989; 04:05	Meteor-2 18	Low Earth		Meteorology
9 June 1989; 10:10	Tsyklon-3		Plesetsk Site 32/2	Failure
9 June 1989; 10:10	Okean-O1	Low Earth (planned)		Ocean observation
24 July 1989; 00:01	Tsyklon-2		Baikonur Site 90/20	Successful
24 July 1989; 00:01	Kosmos 2033 (US-P)	Low Earth		Ocean surveillance
28 August 1989; 00:14	Tsyklon-3		Plesetsk Site 32/2	Successful
28 August 1989; 00:14	Kosmos 2037 (GEO-IK)	Low Earth		Geodesy
14 September 1989; 09:49	Tsyklon-3		Plesetsk Site 32/1	Successful
14 September 1989; 09:49	Kosmos 2038 (Strela-3); Kosmos 2039 (Strela-3); Kosmos 2040 (Strela-3); Kosmos 2041 (Strela-3); Kosmos 2042 (Strela-3); Kosmos 2043 (Strela-3)	Low Earth		Communication
27 September 1989; 16:20	Tsyklon-2		Baikonur Site 90/20	Successful
27 September 1989; 16:20	Kosmos 2046 (US-P)	Low Earth		Ocean surveillance
28 September 1989; 00:05	Tsyklon-3		Plesetsk Site 32/2	Successful
28 September 1989; 00:05	Interkosmos 24; Magion 2	Low Earth		Magnetosphere research
24 October 1989; 21:35	Tsyklon-3		Plesetsk Site 32/1	Successful
24 October 1989; 21:35	Meteor-3 3	Low Earth		Meteorology
24 November 1989; 23:22	Tsyklon-2		Baikonur Site 90/20	Successful
24 November 1989; 23:22	Kosmos 2051 (US-P)	Low Earth		Ocean surveillance
27 December 1989; 00:00	Tsyklon-3		Plesetsk Site 32/2	Successful
27 December 1989; 00:00	Kosmos 2053 (Koltso)	Low Earth		Radar calibration
=== 1990 ===
30 January 1990; 11:20	Tsyklon-3		Plesetsk Site 32/1	Successful
30 January 1990; 11:20	Kosmos 2058 (Tselina-R)	Low Earth		ELINT
28 February 1990; 00:55	Tsyklon-3		Plesetsk Site 32/2	Successful
28 February 1990; 00:55	Okean 2 (Okean-O1)	Low Earth		Ocean observation
14 March 1990; 15:27	Tsyklon-2		Baikonur Site 90/20	Successful
14 March 1990; 15:27	Kosmos 2060 (US-P)	Low Earth		Ocean surveillance
27 June 1990; 22:30	Tsyklon-3		Plesetsk Site 32/1	Successful
27 June 1990; 22:30	Meteor-2 19	Low Earth		Meteorology
30 July 1990; 00:06	Tsyklon-3		Plesetsk Site 32/1	Successful
30 July 1990; 00:06	Kosmos 2088 (GEO-IK)	Low Earth		Geodesy
8 August 1990; 04:15	Tsyklon-3		Plesetsk Site 32/2	Successful
8 August 1990; 04:15	Kosmos 2090 (Strela-3); Kosmos 2091 (Strela-3); Kosmos 2092 (Strela-3); Kosmos 2093 (Strela-3); Kosmos 2094 (Strela-3); Kosmos 2095 (Strela-3)	Low Earth		Communication
23 August 1990; 16:17	Tsyklon-2		Baikonur Site 90/20	Successful
23 August 1990; 16:17	Kosmos 2096 (US-P)	Low Earth		Ocean surveillance
28 September 1990; 07:30	Tsyklon-3		Plesetsk Site 32/1	Successful
28 September 1990; 07:30	Meteor-2 20	Low Earth		Meteorology
14 November 1990; 06:33	Tsyklon-2		Baikonur Site 90/20	Successful
14 November 1990; 06:33	Kosmos 2103 (US-P)	Low Earth		Ocean surveillance
28 November 1990; 16:34	Tsyklon-3		Plesetsk Site 32/2	Successful
28 November 1990; 16:34	Kosmos 2106 (Koltso)	Low Earth		Radar calibration
4 December 1990; 00:48	Tsyklon-2		Baikonur Site 90/20	Successful
4 December 1990; 00:48	Kosmos 2107 (US-P)	Low Earth		Ocean surveillance
22 December 1990; 07:28	Tsyklon-3		Plesetsk Site 32/2	Successful
22 December 1990; 07:28	Kosmos 2114 (Strela-3); Kosmos 2115 (Strela-3); Kosmos 2116 (Strela-3); Kosmos 2117 (Strela-3); Kosmos 2118 (Strela-3); Kosmos 2119 (Strela-3)	Low Earth		Communication
=== 1991 ===
18 January 1991; 11:34	Tsyklon-2		Baikonur Site 90/20	Successful
18 January 1991; 11:34	Kosmos 2122 (US-P)	Low Earth		Ocean surveillance
24 April 1991; 01:37	Tsyklon-3		Plesetsk Site 32/2	Successful
24 April 1991; 01:37	Meteor-3 4	Low Earth		Meteorology
16 May 1991; 21:40	Tsyklon-3		Plesetsk Site 32/2	Successful
16 May 1991; 21:40	Kosmos 2143 (Strela-3); Kosmos 2144 (Strela-3); Kosmos 2145 (Strela-3); Kosmos 2146 (Strela-3); Kosmos 2147 (Strela-3); Kosmos 2148 (Strela-3)	Low Earth		Communication
4 June 1991; 08:10	Tsyklon-3		Plesetsk Site 32/2	Successful
4 June 1991; 08:10	Okean 3 (Okean-O1)	Low Earth		Ocean observation
13 June 1991; 15:41	Tsyklon-3		Plesetsk Site 32/2	Successful
13 June 1991; 15:41	Kosmos 2151 (Tselina-R)	Low Earth		ELINT
15 August 1991; 09:15	Tsyklon-3		Plesetsk Site 32/2	Successful
15 August 1991; 09:15	Meteor-3 5	Low Earth		Meteorology
28 September 1991; 07:05	Tsyklon-3		Plesetsk Site 32/2	Successful
28 September 1991; 07:05	Kosmos 2157 (Strela-3); Kosmos 2158 (Strela-3); Kosmos 2159 (Strela-3); Kosmos 2160 (Strela-3); Kosmos 2161 (Strela-3); Kosmos 2162 (Strela-3)	Low Earth		Communication
12 November 1991; 20:09	Tsyklon-3		Plesetsk Site 32/1	Successful
12 November 1991; 20:09	Kosmos 2165 (Strela-3); Kosmos 2166 (Strela-3); Kosmos 2167 (Strela-3); Kosmos 2168 (Strela-3); Kosmos 2169 (Strela-3); Kosmos 2170 (Strela-3)	Low Earth		Communication
18 December 1991; 03:54	Tsyklon-3		Plesetsk Site 32/2	Successful
18 December 1991; 03:54	Interkosmos 25; Magion 3	Low Earth		Magnetosphere research
=== 1992 ===
13 July 1992; 17:41	Tsyklon-3		Plesetsk Site 32/1	Successful
13 July 1992; 17:41	Kosmos 2197 (Strela-3); Kosmos 2198 (Strela-3); Kosmos 2199 (Strela-3); Kosmos 2200 (Strela-3); Kosmos 2201 (Gonets); Kosmos 2202 (Gonets)	Low Earth		Communication
20 October 1992; 12:58	Tsyklon-3		Plesetsk Site 32/1	Successful
20 October 1992; 12:58	Kosmos 2211 (Strela-3); Kosmos 2212 (Strela-3); Kosmos 2213 (Strela-3); Kosmos 2214 (Strela-3); Kosmos 2215 (Strela-3); Kosmos 2216 (Strela-3)	Low Earth		Communication
24 November 1992; 04:10	Tsyklon-3		Plesetsk Site 32/2	Successful
24 November 1992; 04:10	Kosmos 2221 (Tselina-D)	Low Earth		ELINT
22 December 1992; 12:36	Tsyklon-3		Plesetsk Site 32/2	Successful
22 December 1992; 12:36	Kosmos 2226 (GEO-IK)	Low Earth		Geodesy
25 December 1992; 20:08	Tsyklon-3		Plesetsk Site 32/2	Successful
25 December 1992; 20:08	Kosmos 2228 (Tselina-D)	Low Earth		ELINT
=== 1993 ===
30 March 1993; 12:00	Tsyklon-2		Baikonur Site 90/20	Successful
30 March 1993; 12:00	Kosmos 2238 (US-PM)	Low Earth		Ocean surveillance
16 April 1993; 07:49	Tsyklon-3		Plesetsk Site 32/1	Successful
16 April 1993; 07:49	Kosmos 2242 (Tselina-R)	Low Earth		ELINT
28 April 1993; 03:39	Tsyklon-2		Baikonur Site 90/20	Successful
28 April 1993; 03:39	Kosmos 2244 (US-PM)	Low Earth		Ocean surveillance
11 May 1993; 14:56	Tsyklon-3		Plesetsk Site 32/1	Successful
11 May 1993; 14:56	Kosmos 2245 (Strela-3); Kosmos 2246 (Strela-3); Kosmos 2247 (Strela-3); Kosmos 2248 (Strela-3); Kosmos 2249 (Strela-3); Kosmos 2250 (Strela-3)	Low Earth		Communication
24 June 1993; 04:12	Tsyklon-3		Plesetsk Site 32/1	Successful
24 June 1993; 04:12	Kosmos 2252 (Strela-3); Kosmos 2253 (Strela-3); Kosmos 2254 (Strela-3); Kosmos 2255 (Strela-3); Kosmos 2256 (Strela-3); Kosmos 2257 (Strela-3)	Low Earth		Communication
7 July 1993; 07:15	Tsyklon-2		Baikonur Site 90/20	Successful
7 July 1993; 07:15	Kosmos 2258 (US-PM)	Low Earth		Ocean surveillance
31 August 1993; 04:40	Tsyklon-3		Plesetsk Site 32/1	Successful
31 August 1993; 04:40	Meteor-2 21; Temisat	Low Earth		Meteorology; Technology
17 September 1993; 00:43	Tsyklon-2		Baikonur Site 90/20	Successful
17 September 1993; 00:43	Kosmos 2264 (US-PM)	Low Earth		Ocean surveillance
=== 1994 ===
25 January 1994; 00:25	Tsyklon-3		Plesetsk Site 32/1	Successful
25 January 1994; 00:25	Meteor-3 6 Tubsat B	Low Earth		Meteorology; Technology
12 February 1994; 08:54	Tsyklon-3		Plesetsk Site 32/1	Successful
12 February 1994; 08:54	Kosmos 2268 (Strela-3); Kosmos 2269 (Strela-3); Kosmos 2270 (Strela-3); Kosmos 2271 (Strela-3); Kosmos 2272 (Strela-3); Kosmos 2273 (Strela-3)	Low Earth		Communication
2 March 1994; 03:25	Tsyklon-3		Plesetsk Site 32/1	Successful
2 March 1994; 03:25	Koronas-I	Low Earth		Solar observation
25 May 1994; 10:15	Tsyklon-3		Plesetsk Site 32/2	Failure
25 May 1994; 10:15	Tselina-D	Low Earth (planned)		ELINT
25 May 1994; 10:15	Guidance system short circuit caused 2nd stage fail to shut down engine and separate			
11 October 1994; 14:30	Tsyklon-3		Plesetsk Site 32/2	Successful
11 October 1994; 14:30	Okean 4 (Okean-O1)	Low Earth		Ocean observation
2 November 1994; 01:04	Tsyklon-2		Baikonur Site 90/20	Successful
2 November 1994; 01:04	Kosmos 2293 (US-PM)	Low Earth		Ocean surveillance
29 November 1994; 02:54	Tsyklon-3		Plesetsk Site 32/2	Successful
29 November 1994; 02:54	GEO-IK 1	Low Earth		Geodesy
26 December 1994; 22:27	Tsyklon-3		Plesetsk Site 32/2	Successful
26 December 1994; 22:27	Kosmos 2299 (Strela-3); Kosmos 2300 (Strela-3); Kosmos 2301 (Strela-3); Kosmos 2302 (Strela-3); Kosmos 2303 (Strela-3); Kosmos 2304 (Strela-3)	Low Earth		Communication
=== 1995 ===
8 June 1995; 04:43	Tsyklon-2		Baikonur Site 90/20	Successful
8 June 1995; 04:43	Kosmos 2313 (US-PM)	Low Earth		Ocean surveillance
31 August 1995; 06:50	Tsyklon-3		Plesetsk Site 32/2	Successful
31 August 1995; 06:50	Sich-1 (Okean-O1); FASat Alfa	Low Earth		Ocean observation Earth observation
20 December 1995; 00:52	Tsyklon-2		Baikonur Site 90/20	Successful
20 December 1995; 00:52	Kosmos 2326 (US-PM)	Low Earth		Ocean surveillance
=== 1996 ===
19 February 1996; 00:58	Tsyklon-3		Plesetsk Site 32/1	Successful
19 February 1996; 00:58	Kosmos 2328 (Strela-3); Kosmos 2329 (Strela-3); Kosmos 2330 (Strela-3); Gonets 1 Gonets 2 Gonets 3	Low Earth		Communication
11 December 1996; 12:00	Tsyklon-2		Baikonur Site 90/19	Successful
11 December 1996; 12:00	Kosmos 2335 (US-PM)	Low Earth		Ocean surveillance
=== 1997 ===
14 February 1997; 03:47	Tsyklon-3		Plesetsk Site 32/1	Successful
14 February 1997; 03:47	Kosmos 2337 (Strela-3); Kosmos 2338 (Strela-3); Kosmos 2339 (Strela-3); Gonets 4 Gonets 5 Gonets 6	Low Earth		Communication
9 December 1997; 07:17	Tsyklon-2		Baikonur Site 90/19	Successful
9 December 1997; 07:17	Kosmos 2347 (US-PM)	Low Earth		Ocean surveillance
=== 1998 ===
15 June 1998; 22:58	Tsyklon-3		Plesetsk Site 32/1	Partial Failure
15 June 1998; 22:58	Kosmos 2352 (Strela-3); Kosmos 2353 (Strela-3); Kosmos 2354 (Strela-3); Kosmos 2355 (Strela-3); Kosmos 2356 (Strela-3); Kosmos 2357 (Strela-3)	Low Earth		Communication
15 June 1998; 22:58	Guidance program problem caused satellites to be deployed into incorrect but still usable orbit			
=== 1999 ===
26 December 1999; 08:00	Tsyklon-2		Baikonur Site 90/20	Successful
26 December 1999; 08:00	Kosmos 2367 (US-PM)	Low Earth		Ocean surveillance
=== 2000 ===
27 December 2000; 09:56	Tsyklon-3		Plesetsk Site 32/1	Failure
27 December 2000; 09:56	Strela-3; Strela-3; Strela-3; Gonets 7 Gonets 8 Gonets 9	Low Earth (planned)		Communication
27 December 2000; 09:56	Third stage control failure			
=== 2001 ===
31 July 2001; 08:00	Tsyklon-3		Plesetsk Site 32/2	Successful
31 July 2001; 08:00	Koronas-F	Low Earth		Solar observation
21 December 2001; 04:00	Tsyklon-2		Baikonur Site 90/20	Successful
21 December 2001; 04:00	Kosmos 2383 (US-PM)	Low Earth		Ocean surveillance
28 December 2001; 03:24	Tsyklon-3		Plesetsk Site 32/1	Successful
28 December 2001; 03:24	Kosmos 2384 (Strela-3); Kosmos 2385 (Strela-3); Kosmos 2386 (Strela-3); Gonets 10; Gonets 11; Gonets 12	Low Earth		Communication
=== 2004 ===
28 May 2004; 06:00	Tsyklon-2		Baikonur Site 90/20	Successful
28 May 2004; 06:00	Kosmos 2405 (US-PM)	Low Earth		Ocean surveillance
24 December 2004; 11:20	Tsyklon-3		Plesetsk Site 32/2	Partial Failure
24 December 2004; 11:20	Sich-1M; MK-1TS	Low Earth		Ocean observation Earth observation
24 December 2004; 11:20	Orbit reached lower than planned			
=== 2006 ===
25 June 2006; 04:00	Tsyklon-2		Baikonur Site 90/20	Successful
25 June 2006; 04:00	Kosmos 2421 (US-PM)	Low Earth		Ocean surveillance
25 June 2006; 04:00	Final flight of the Tsyklon-2			
=== 2009 ===
30 January 2009; 13:30	Tsyklon-3		Plesetsk Site 32/2	Successful
30 January 2009; 13:30	Koronas-Foton	Low Earth		Solar observation
30 January 2009; 13:30	Final flight of the Tsyklon-3			
