= Sfera (satellite series) =

Defunct Soviet geodetic satellites

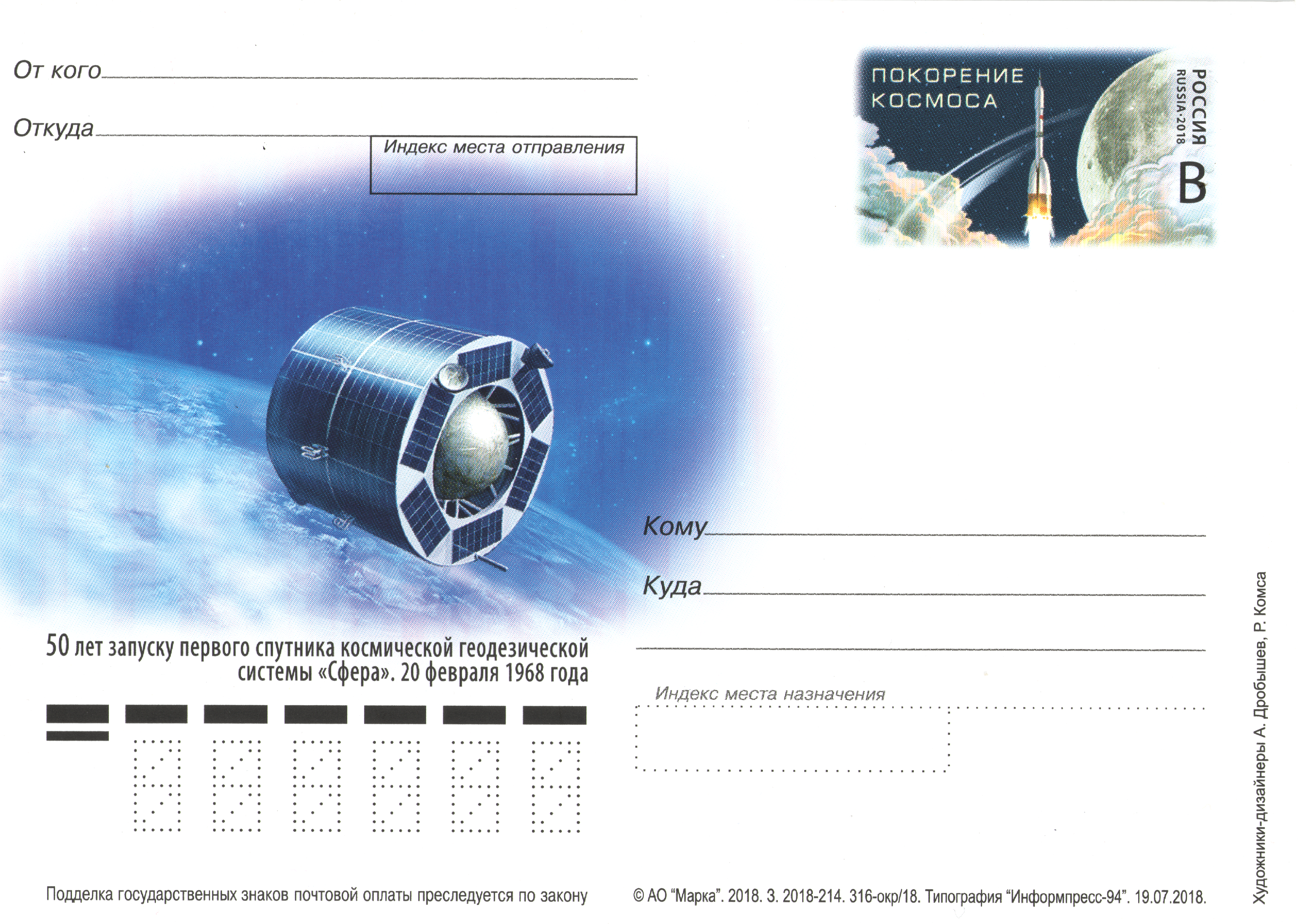
Russian postal card (2016) celebrating 50 year anniversary of Sfera

Sfera (meaning sphere, Russian: Сфера) was a series of Soviet geodetic satellites.

== Launches ==
18 satellites were launched from 1968 to 1978, with only one failure.

Number	Name	Launch date	Launch site	Mass kg	NSSDC ID	NORAD ID	Inclination	Apogee km	Perigee km
1	Kosmos-203	20 February 1968	Plesetsk LC132	600 kg	1968-011A	3129	74,1°	1201	1183
-	-	4 June 1968	Plesetsk LC132/2	Failure					
2	Kosmos-256	30 November 1968	Plesetsk LC132/1	600 kg	1968-106A	3576	74,1°	1223	1172
3	Kosmos-272	17 March 1969	Plesetsk LC132/1	600 kg	1969-024A	3818	74,0°	1208	1178
4	Kosmos-312	24 November 1969	Plesetsk LC132/1	600 kg	1969-103A	4254	74,0°	1175	1141
5	Kosmos-409	28 April 1971	Plesetsk LC132/1	600 kg	1971-038A	5180	74,0°	1218	1183
6	Kosmos-457	20 November 1971	Plesetsk LC132/2	600 kg	1971-099A	5614	74,0°	1211	1176
7	Kosmos-480	25 March 1972	Plesetsk LC132/1	600 kg	1972-019A	5905	83,0°	1199	1173
8	Kosmos-539	21 December 1972	Plesetsk LC132/2	600 kg	1972-102A	6319	74,0°	1379	1342
9	Kosmos-585	8 September 1973	Plesetsk LC132/2	600 kg	1973-064A	6825	74,0°	1424	1364
10	Kosmos-650	29 April 1974	Plesetsk LC132/2	600 kg	1974-028A	7281	74,0°	1401	1368
11	Kosmos-675	29 August 1974	Plesetsk LC132/2	600 kg	1974-069A	7424	74,1°	1424	1364
12	Kosmos-708	12 February 1975	Plesetsk LC132/1	600 kg	1975-012A	7663	69,2°	1410	1368
13	Kosmos-770	24 September 1975	Plesetsk LC132/1	650 kg	1975-089A	8325	83,0°	1208	1165
14	Kosmos-842	21 July 1976	Plesetsk LC132/1	650 kg	1976-070A	9025	83,0°	1006	966
15	Kosmos-911	25 May 1977	Plesetsk LC132/2	700 kg	1977-039A	10019	83,0°	999	965
16	Kosmos-963	24 November 1977	Plesetsk LC132/1	650 kg	1977-109A	10491	82,9°	1206	1179
17	Kosmos-1067	26 December 1978	Plesetsk LC132/2	880 kg	1978-122A	11168	83,0°	1213	1156

== See also ==
- Satellite geodesy
- Geo-IK-2
- List of Kosmos satellites (1–250)
- List of Kosmos satellites (251–500)
- List of Kosmos satellites (501–750)
- List of Kosmos satellites (751–1000)
- List of Kosmos satellites (1001–1250)
