= Kosmos 487 =

Soviet radar calibration satellite

- Mission type: ABM radar target
- COSPAR ID: 1972-033A
- SATCAT no.: 06006

Spacecraft properties
- Spacecraft type: DS-P1-Yu
- Manufacturer: Yuzhnoye
- Launch mass: 325 kilograms (717 lb)

Start of mission
- Launch date: 21 April 1972, 11:59:59 UTC
- Rocket: Kosmos-2I 63SM
- Launch site: Plesetsk 133/1

End of mission
- Decay date: 24 September 1972

Orbital parameters
- Reference system: Geocentric
- Regime: Low Earth
- Perigee altitude: 262 kilometres (163 mi)
- Apogee altitude: 468 kilometres (291 mi)
- Inclination: 70.9 degrees
- Period: 91.8 minutes

Kosmos 487 (Russian: Космос 487 meaning Cosmos 487), known before launch as DS-P1-Yu No.57, was a Soviet satellite which was launched in 1972 as part of the Dnepropetrovsk Sputnik programme. It was a 325-kilogram (717 lb) spacecraft, which was built by the Yuzhnoye Design Bureau, and was used as a radar calibration target for anti-ballistic missile tests.

Kosmos 487 was successfully launched into low Earth orbit at 11:59:59 UTC on 21 April 1972. The launch took place from Site 133/1 at the Plesetsk Cosmodrome, and used a Kosmos-2I 63SM carrier rocket. Upon reaching orbit, the satellite was assigned its Kosmos designation, and received the International Designator 1972-033A. The North American Aerospace Defense Command assigned it the catalogue number 06006.

Kosmos 487 was the fifty-third of seventy nine DS-P1-Yu satellites to be launched, and the forty-eighth of seventy two to successfully reach orbit. It was operated in an orbit with a perigee of 262 kilometres (163 mi), an apogee of 468 kilometres (291 mi), 70.9 degrees of inclination, and an orbital period of 91.8 minutes. It remained in orbit until it decayed and reentered the atmosphere on 24 September 1972.

== See also ==
- 1972 in spaceflight
