= Kosmos 347 =

Soviet radar calibration target satellite

- Mission type: ABM radar target
- COSPAR ID: 1970-043A
- SATCAT no.: 04411

Spacecraft properties
- Spacecraft type: DS-P1-Yu
- Manufacturer: Yuzhnoye
- Launch mass: 250 kilograms (550 lb)

Start of mission
- Launch date: 12 June 1970, 09:30:02 UTC
- Rocket: Kosmos-2I 63SM
- Launch site: Kapustin Yar 86/4

End of mission
- Decay date: 7 November 1971

Orbital parameters
- Reference system: Geocentric
- Regime: Low Earth
- Perigee altitude: 214 kilometres (133 mi)
- Apogee altitude: 1,970 kilometres (1,220 mi)
- Inclination: 48.4 degrees
- Period: 107.1 minutes

Kosmos 347 (Russian: Космос 347 meaning Cosmos 347), known before launch as DS-P1-Yu No.35, was a Soviet satellite which was launched in 1970 as part of the Dnepropetrovsk Sputnik programme. It was a 250-kilogram (550 lb) spacecraft, which was built by the Yuzhnoye Design Bureau, and was used as a radar calibration target for anti-ballistic missile tests.

== Launch ==
Kosmos 347 was launched from Site 86/4 at Kapustin Yar, atop a Kosmos-2I 63SM carrier rocket. The launch occurred on 12 June 1970 at 09:30:02 UTC, and resulted in the successful deployment of Kosmos 347 into low Earth orbit. Upon reaching orbit, it was assigned its Kosmos designation, and received the International Designator 1970-043A.

== Orbit ==
Kosmos 347 was the thirty-third of seventy nine DS-P1-Yu satellites to be launched, and the thirtieth of seventy two to successfully reach orbit. It was operated in an orbit with a perigee of 214 kilometres (133 mi), an apogee of 1,970 kilometres (1,220 mi), 48.4 degrees of inclination, and an orbital period of 107.1 minutes. It remained in orbit until it decayed and reentered the atmosphere on 7 November 1971.
