= Kosmos 357 =

Soviet radar calibration target satellite

- Mission type: ABM radar target
- COSPAR ID: 1970-063A
- SATCAT no.: 04495

Spacecraft properties
- Spacecraft type: DS-P1-Yu
- Manufacturer: Yuzhnoye
- Launch mass: 325 kilograms (717 lb)

Start of mission
- Launch date: 19 August 1970, 14:59:53 UTC
- Rocket: Kosmos-2I 63SM
- Launch site: Plesetsk 133/1

End of mission
- Decay date: 24 November 1970

Orbital parameters
- Reference system: Geocentric
- Regime: Low Earth
- Perigee altitude: 263 kilometres (163 mi)
- Apogee altitude: 433 kilometres (269 mi)
- Inclination: 70.9 degrees
- Period: 91.5 minutes

Kosmos 357 (Russian: Космос 357 meaning Cosmos 357), known before launch as DS-P1-Yu No.40, was a Soviet satellite which was launched in 1970 as part of the Dnepropetrovsk Sputnik programme. It was a 325-kilogram (717 lb) spacecraft, which was built by the Yuzhnoye Design Bureau, and was used as a radar calibration target for anti-ballistic missile tests.

== Launch ==
Kosmos 357 was launched from Site 133/1 at the Plesetsk Cosmodrome, atop a Kosmos-2I 63SM carrier rocket. The launch occurred on 19 August 1970 at 14:59:53 UTC, and resulted in the successful deployment of Kosmos 357 into low Earth orbit. Upon reaching orbit, it was assigned its Kosmos designation, and received the International Designator 1970-063A.

== Orbit ==
Kosmos 357 was the thirty-fifth of seventy nine DS-P1-Yu satellites to be launched, and the thirty-second of seventy two to successfully reach orbit. It was operated in an orbit with a perigee of 263 kilometres (163 mi), an apogee of 433 kilometres (269 mi), 70.9 degrees of inclination, and an orbital period of 91.5 minutes. It remained in orbit until it decayed and reentered the atmosphere on 24 November 1970.
