= Kosmos 356 =

Soviet satellite

- Mission type: Magnetospheric
- COSPAR ID: 1970-059A
- SATCAT no.: 04487

Spacecraft properties
- Spacecraft type: DS-U2-MG
- Manufacturer: Yuzhnoye
- Launch mass: 357 kilograms (787 lb)

Start of mission
- Launch date: 10 August 1970, 19:59:55 UTC
- Rocket: Kosmos-2I 63SM
- Launch site: Plesetsk 133/1

End of mission
- Decay date: 2 October 1970

Orbital parameters
- Reference system: Geocentric
- Regime: Low Earth
- Perigee altitude: 226 kilometres (140 mi)
- Apogee altitude: 548 kilometres (341 mi)
- Inclination: 81.9 degrees
- Period: 92.3 minutes

Kosmos 356 (Russian: Космос 356 meaning Cosmos 356), also known as DS-U2-MG No.2, was a Soviet satellite which was launched in 1970 as part of the Dnepropetrovsk Sputnik programme. It was a 357-kilogram (787 lb) spacecraft, which was built by the Yuzhnoye Design Bureau, and was used to investigate the magnetic poles of the Earth.

== Launch ==
A Kosmos-2I 63SM carrier rocket was used to launch Kosmos 356 into low Earth orbit. The launch took place from Site 133/1 at the Plesetsk Cosmodrome. The launch occurred at 19:59:55 UTC on 10 August 1970, and resulted in the successful insertion of the satellite into orbit. Upon reaching orbit, the satellite was assigned its Kosmos designation, and received the International Designator 1970-059A. The North American Aerospace Defense Command assigned it the catalogue number 04487.

== Orbit ==
Kosmos 356 was the second of two DS-U2-MG satellites to be launched, after Kosmos 321. It was operated in an orbit with a perigee of 226 kilometres (140 mi), an apogee of 548 kilometres (341 mi), 81.9 degrees of inclination, and an orbital period of 92.3 minutes, before decaying from orbit and reentering the atmosphere on 2 October 1970.
