= Kosmos 321 =

Soviet magnetic pole observation satellite

- Mission type: Magnetospheric
- COSPAR ID: 1970-006A
- SATCAT no.: 04308

Spacecraft properties
- Spacecraft type: DS-U2-MG
- Manufacturer: Yuzhnoye
- Launch mass: 365 kilograms (805 lb)

Start of mission
- Launch date: 20 January 1970, 20:19:59 UTC
- Rocket: Kosmos-2I 63SM
- Launch site: Plesetsk 133/1

End of mission
- Decay date: 23 March 1970

Orbital parameters
- Reference system: Geocentric
- Regime: Low Earth
- Perigee altitude: 259 kilometres (161 mi)
- Apogee altitude: 417 kilometres (259 mi)
- Inclination: 70.9 degrees
- Period: 91.3 minutes

Kosmos 321 (Russian: Космос 321 meaning Cosmos 321), also known as DS-U2-MG No.1, was a Soviet satellite which was launched in 1970 as part of the Dnepropetrovsk Sputnik programme. It was a 365-kilogram (805 lb) spacecraft, which was built by the Yuzhnoye Design Bureau, and was used to investigate the magnetic poles of the Earth.

== Launch ==
A Kosmos-2I 63SM carrier rocket was used to launch Kosmos 321 into low Earth orbit. The launch took place from Site 133/1 at the Plesetsk Cosmodrome. The launch occurred at 20:19:59 UTC on 20 January 1970, and resulted in the successful insertion of the satellite into orbit. Upon reaching orbit, the satellite was assigned its Kosmos designation, and received the International Designator 1970-006A. The North American Aerospace Defense Command assigned it the catalogue number 04308.

== Orbit ==
Kosmos 321 was the first of two DS-U2-MG satellites to be launched, the other being Kosmos 356. It was operated in an orbit with a perigee of 259 kilometres (161 mi), an apogee of 417 kilometres (259 mi), 70.9 degrees of inclination, and an orbital period of 91.3 minutes. It completed operations on 13 March 1970, before decaying from orbit and reentering the atmosphere on 23 March.

== Objectives ==
Cosmos 321’s mission was to study Earth’s magnetic poles.
