= Gonets =

Russian civilian low Earth orbit communication satellite system

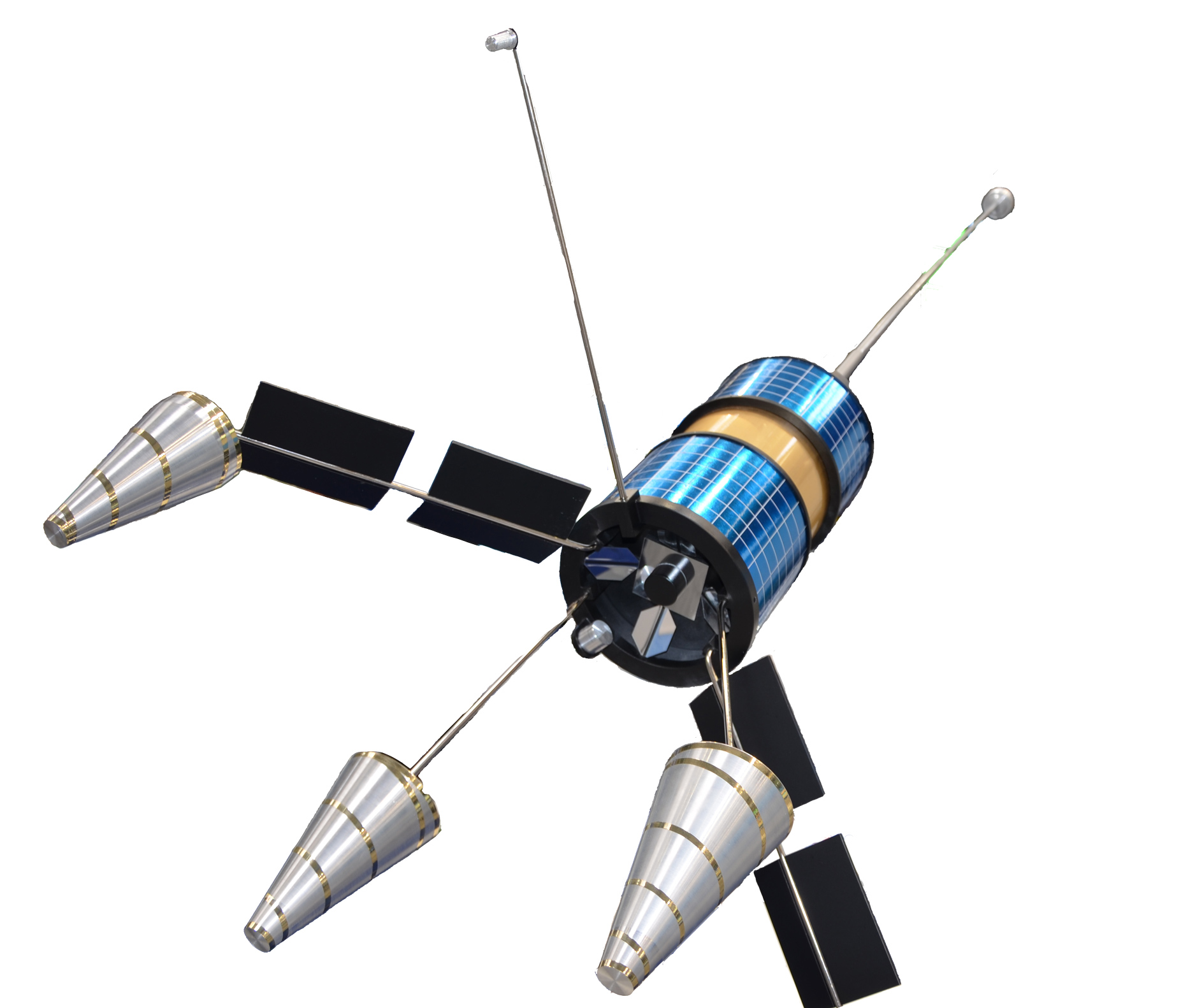
- A Gonets-M satellite at Salon du Bourget in 2013
- Manufacturer: NPO Prikladnoi Mekhaniki
- Country of origin: Russia
- Operator: Gonets SatCom (1996–present); Roscosmos (1992–1996)
- Applications: Communications

Specifications
- Bus: Gonets
- Launch mass: 233 to 280 kg
- Power: 40 watts from solar panels
- Batteries: Nickel-hydrogen
- Equipment: UHF transponders (B-band / D-band); Data rate up to 64 kbit/s
- Regime: Low Earth orbit
- Design life: 5 years (planned)

Production
- Status: Active

Related spacecraft
- Derived from: Strela

Gonets (Russian Гонец, for Messenger) is a Russian civilian low Earth orbit communications satellite system. It consists of a number of satellites, derived from Strela military communications satellites. The first two satellites, which were used to test and validate the system, were launched by a Tsyklon-3 launch vehicle from the Plesetsk Cosmodrome on 13 July 1992, and were designated Gonets-D. The first operational satellites, designated Gonets-D1, were launched on 19 February 1996. After launch, the first three satellites were given military Kosmos designations, a practice which was not continued with the other satellites.

Ten operational satellites and two demonstration spacecraft have been placed in orbit. A further three were lost in a launch failure on 27 December 2000. A new series of modernised Gonets satellites, Gonets-D1M, supplement and replace the satellites which are currently in orbit. A single first D1M satellite was launched by a Kosmos-3M launch vehicle on 21 December 2005. A second Gonets-D1M satellite was launched by a Rokot launch vehicle on 8 September 2010.

== Operator ==
Gonets satellites are operated along with the third generation Luch satellites by Gonets Satellite System company. Gonets was originally a Roscosmos programme, but in 1996 it was privatised and operated by Gonets Satellite System, which was controlled by ISS Reshetnev. In 2017, Roscosmos acquired 80% of Gonets SatCom from ISS Reshetnev. The remaining 20% were held by Dauria Satcom. By 2018, Dauria Satcom sold the shares to Business-Sfera of Coalco group while Roscosmos sold 29% to other private investors. Gonets SatCom has become a Russian space industry company with the largest (49%) share of private capital.

== User characteristics ==
As of 2016, the Gonets orbit group comprises 25 second-generation spacecraft "Gonets-M" and 1 first-generation "Gonets-D1". The orbital group performs the task of direct communication with subscribers at any point of the globe. With such a number of spacecraft in the Gonets orbit group, the system provides communication with waiting time characteristics as indicated in the following table. The next 3 Gonets-M satellites will be launched in 2022 by an Angara-1.2 launcher from the Plesetsk cosmodrome.

waiting time characteristics
City, location	latitude	Session probability = 0.9 Waiting time	Session probability = 0.8 Waiting time	Session probability = 0.7 Waiting time
Meru, Kenya	0°	25.04 min	19.98 min	13.54 min
Fuli, Vietnam / Vitoria, Brazil	20° / −20°	19.47 min	14.97 min	8.85 min
Yerevan, Armenia / Wellington, New Zealand	40° / −40°	17.79 min	12.04 min	6.08 min
Belgorod, Russia / Isla Duque de York, Chile	50° / −50°	15.00 min	8.19 min	2.17 min
Vyborg, Russia / Orcadas Antarctic Station	60° / −60°	5.64 min	1.78 min	0.00 min
Kara Gate Straight, Barents Sea / Novolazarevskaya Station, Antarctic	70° / −70°	3.45 min	0.00 min	0.00 min
Gall Island, North Arctic Ocean / Antarctic Kunlun Station	80° / −80°	0.00 min	0.00 min	0.00 min
North Pole / Amundsen–Scott South Pole Station	90° / −90°	0.00 min	0.00 min	0.00 min

Technical characteristics of subscriber terminals 0.3–0.4 GHz

Transmitter power	8–10 W
Positioning accuracy by GPS/GLONASS	up to 10 m
Modulation	GMSK
Power supply	AC 220 V, DC 12 V
Weight	100–300 g
Bitrates: "Subscriber – Satellite"	2.4–9.6 kbit/s
Bitrates: "Satellite – Subscriber"	9.6–76.8 kbit/s

== See also ==
- Iridium
- Globalstar
- Orbcomm
