= Kosmos 481 =

Soviet radar calibration satellite

- Mission type: ABM radar target
- COSPAR ID: 1972-020A
- SATCAT no.: 05906

Spacecraft properties
- Spacecraft type: DS-P1-Yu
- Manufacturer: Yuzhnoye
- Launch mass: 375 kilograms (827 lb)

Start of mission
- Launch date: 25 March 1972, 10:39:59 UTC
- Rocket: Kosmos-2I 63SM
- Launch site: Plesetsk 133/1

End of mission
- Decay date: 2 September 1972

Orbital parameters
- Reference system: Geocentric
- Regime: Low Earth
- Perigee altitude: 262 kilometres (163 mi)
- Apogee altitude: 478 kilometres (297 mi)
- Inclination: 71 degrees
- Period: 92 minutes

Kosmos 481 (Russian: Космос 481 meaning Cosmos 481), known before launch as DS-P1-Yu No.46, was a Soviet satellite which was launched in 1972 as part of the Dnepropetrovsk Sputnik programme. It was a 375-kilogram (827 lb) spacecraft, which was built by the Yuzhnoye Design Bureau, and was used as a radar calibration target for anti-ballistic missile tests.

== Launch ==
Kosmos 481 was successfully launched into low Earth orbit at 10:39:59 UTC on 25 March 1972. The launch took place from Site 133/1 at the Plesetsk Cosmodrome, and used a Kosmos-2I 63SM carrier rocket.

== Orbit ==
Upon reaching orbit, it was assigned its Kosmos designation, and received the International Designator 1972-020A. The North American Aerospace Defense Command assigned it the catalogue number 05906.

Kosmos 481 was the fifty-first of seventy nine DS-P1-Yu satellites to be launched, and the forty-sixth of seventy two to successfully reach orbit. It was operated in an orbit with a perigee of 262 kilometres (163 mi), an apogee of 478 kilometres (297 mi), 71 degrees of inclination, and an orbital period of 92 minutes. It remained in orbit until it decayed and reentered the atmosphere on 2 September 1972.

== See also ==
- 1972 in spaceflight
