= Kosmos 348 =

Soviet satellite

- Mission type: Aeronomy; Auroral
- COSPAR ID: 1970-044A
- SATCAT no.: 04413

Spacecraft properties
- Spacecraft type: DS-U2-GK
- Manufacturer: Yuzhnoye
- Launch mass: 357 kilograms (787 lb)

Start of mission
- Launch date: 13 June 1970, 04:59:57 UTC
- Rocket: Kosmos-2I 63SM
- Launch site: Plesetsk 133/1

End of mission
- Decay date: 25 July 1970

Orbital parameters
- Reference system: Geocentric
- Regime: Low Earth
- Perigee altitude: 199 kilometres (124 mi)
- Apogee altitude: 589 kilometres (366 mi)
- Inclination: 71 degrees
- Period: 92.4 minutes

Kosmos 348 (Russian: Космос 348 meaning Cosmos 348), also known as DS-U2-GK No.2, was a Soviet satellite which was launched in 1970 as part of the Dnepropetrovsk Sputnik programme. It was a 357-kilogram (787 lb) spacecraft, which was built by the Yuzhnoye Design Bureau, and was used to study the density of air in the upper atmosphere, and investigate aurorae.

== Launch ==
A Kosmos-2I 63SM carrier rocket was used to launch Kosmos 348 into low Earth orbit. The launch took place from Site 133/1 at the Plesetsk Cosmodrome, with liftoff occurring at 04:59:57 UTC on 13 June 1970. Kosmos 348 was successfully inserted into orbit. On reaching orbit, the satellite was assigned its Kosmos designation and received the International Designator 1970-044A. The North American Aerospace Defense Command assigned it the catalogue number 04413.

== Orbit ==
Kosmos 348 was the second of two DS-U2-GK satellites to be launched. It was operated in an orbit with a perigee of 199 kilometres (124 mi), an apogee of 589 kilometres (366 mi), 71 degrees of inclination and an orbital period of 92.4 minutes. It decayed from orbit within a few weeks of its launch, re-entering the atmosphere on 25 July 1970.
