= Kosmos 498 =

Soviet radar calibration satellite

- Mission type: ABM radar target
- COSPAR ID: 1972-050A
- SATCAT no.: 06086

Spacecraft properties
- Spacecraft type: DS-P1-Yu
- Manufacturer: Yuzhnoye
- Launch mass: 325 kilograms (717 lb)

Start of mission
- Launch date: 5 July 1972, 09:29:58 UTC
- Rocket: Kosmos-2I 63SM
- Launch site: Plesetsk 133/1

End of mission
- Decay date: 25 November 1972

Orbital parameters
- Reference system: Geocentric
- Regime: Low Earth
- Perigee altitude: 266 kilometres (165 mi)
- Apogee altitude: 461 kilometres (286 mi)
- Inclination: 70.9 degrees
- Period: 91.8 minutes

Kosmos 498 (Russian: Космос 498 meaning Cosmos 498), known before launch as DS-P1-Yu No.56, was a Soviet satellite which was launched in 1972 as part of the Dnepropetrovsk Sputnik programme. It was a 325-kilogram (717 lb) spacecraft, which was built by the Yuzhnoye Design Bureau, and was used as a radar calibration target for anti-ballistic missile tests.

Kosmos 498 was successfully launched into low Earth orbit at 09:29:58 UTC on 5 July 1972. The launch took place from Site 133/1 at the Plesetsk Cosmodrome, and used a Kosmos-2I 63SM carrier rocket. Upon reaching orbit, the satellite was assigned its Kosmos designation, and received the International Designator 1972-050A. The North American Aerospace Defense Command assigned it the catalogue number 06086.

Kosmos 498 was the fifty-fifth of seventy nine DS-P1-Yu satellites to be launched, and the forty-ninth of seventy two to successfully reach orbit. It was operated in an orbit with a perigee of 266 kilometres (165 mi), an apogee of 461 kilometres (286 mi), 70.9 degrees of inclination, and an orbital period of 91.8 minutes. It remained in orbit until it decayed and reentered the atmosphere on 25 November 1972.

== See also ==
- 1972 in spaceflight
