= Kosmos 472 =

Soviet radar calibration satellite

- Mission type: ABM radar target
- COSPAR ID: 1972-004A
- SATCAT no.: 05804

Spacecraft properties
- Spacecraft type: DS-P1-Yu
- Manufacturer: Yuzhnoye
- Launch mass: 250 kilograms (550 lb)

Start of mission
- Launch date: 25 January 1972, 11:15:01 UTC
- Rocket: Kosmos-2I 63SM
- Launch site: Plesetsk 133/1

End of mission
- Decay date: 18 August 1972

Orbital parameters
- Reference system: Geocentric
- Regime: Low Earth
- Perigee altitude: 195 kilometres (121 mi)
- Apogee altitude: 1,417 kilometres (880 mi)
- Inclination: 81.9 degrees
- Period: 101 minutes

Kosmos 472 (Russian: Космос 472 meaning Cosmos 472), known before launch as DS-P1-Yu No.52, was a Soviet satellite which was launched in 1972 as part of the Dnepropetrovsk Sputnik programme. It was a 250-kilogram (550 lb) spacecraft, which was built by the Yuzhnoye Design Bureau, and was used as a radar calibration target for anti-ballistic missile tests.

== Launch ==
Kosmos 472 was successfully launched into low Earth orbit on 25 January 1972, with the rocket lifting off at 11:15:01 UTC. The launch took place from Site 133/1 at the Plesetsk Cosmodrome, and used a Kosmos-2I 63SM carrier rocket.

== Orbit ==
Upon reaching orbit, it was assigned its Kosmos designation, and received the International Designator 1972-004A. The North American Aerospace Defense Command assigned it the catalogue number 05804.

Kosmos 472 was the fiftieth of seventy nine DS-P1-Yu satellites to be launched, and the forty-fifth of seventy two to successfully reach orbit. It was operated in an orbit with a perigee of 195 kilometres (121 mi), an apogee of 1,417 kilometres (880 mi), 81.9 degrees of inclination, and an orbital period of 101 minutes. It remained in orbit until it decayed and reentered the atmosphere on 18 August 1972.

== See also ==
- 1972 in spaceflight
