= Kosmos 351 =

Soviet radar calibration target satellite

- Mission type: ABM radar target
- COSPAR ID: 1970-051A
- SATCAT no.: 04427

Spacecraft properties
- Spacecraft type: DS-P1-Yu
- Manufacturer: Yuzhnoye
- Launch mass: 325 kilograms (717 lb)

Start of mission
- Launch date: 27 June 1970, 07:39:55 UTC
- Rocket: Kosmos-2I 63SM
- Launch site: Plesetsk 133/1

End of mission
- Decay date: 13 October 1970

Orbital parameters
- Reference system: Geocentric
- Regime: Low Earth
- Perigee altitude: 261 kilometres (162 mi)
- Apogee altitude: 429 kilometres (267 mi)
- Inclination: 70.9 degrees
- Period: 91.43 minutes

Kosmos 351 (Russian: Космос 351 meaning Cosmos 351), known before launch as DS-P1-Yu No.38, was a Soviet satellite which was launched in 1970 as part of the Dnepropetrovsk Sputnik programme. It was a 325-kilogram (717 lb) spacecraft, which was built by the Yuzhnoye Design Bureau, and was used as a radar calibration target for anti-ballistic missile tests.

== Launch ==
Kosmos 351 was launched from Site 133/1 at the Plesetsk Cosmodrome, atop a Kosmos-2I 63SM carrier rocket. The launch occurred on 27 June 1970 at 07:39:55 UTC, and resulted in the successful deployment of Kosmos 351 into low Earth orbit. Upon reaching orbit, it was assigned its Kosmos designation, and received the International Designator 1970-051A.

== Orbit ==
Kosmos 351 was the thirty-fourth of seventy nine DS-P1-Yu satellites to be launched, and the thirty-first of seventy two to successfully reach orbit. It was operated in an orbit with a perigee of 261 kilometres (162 mi), an apogee of 429 kilometres (267 mi), 70.9 degrees of inclination, and an orbital period of 91.43 minutes. It remained in orbit until it decayed and reentered the atmosphere on 13 October 1970.
