= Kosmos 485 =

Soviet radar calibration satellite

- Mission type: ABM radar target
- COSPAR ID: 1972-028A
- SATCAT no.: 05938

Spacecraft properties
- Spacecraft type: DS-P1-Yu
- Manufacturer: Yuzhnoye
- Launch mass: 325 kilograms (717 lb)

Start of mission
- Launch date: 11 April 1972, 11:04:58 UTC
- Rocket: Kosmos-2I 63SM
- Launch site: Plesetsk 133/1

End of mission
- Decay date: 30 August 1972

Orbital parameters
- Reference system: Geocentric
- Regime: Low Earth
- Perigee altitude: 262 kilometres (163 mi)
- Apogee altitude: 444 kilometres (276 mi)
- Inclination: 70.9 degrees
- Period: 91.6 minutes

Kosmos 485 (Russian: Космос 485 meaning Cosmos 485), known before launch as DS-P1-Yu No.58, was a Soviet satellite which was launched in 1972 as part of the Dnepropetrovsk Sputnik programme. It was a 325-kilogram (717 lb) spacecraft, which was built by the Yuzhnoye Design Bureau, and was used as a radar calibration target for anti-ballistic missile tests.

Kosmos 485 was successfully launched into low Earth orbit at 11:04:58 UTC on 11 April 1972. The launch took place from Site 133/1 at the Plesetsk Cosmodrome, and used a Kosmos-2I 63SM carrier rocket. Upon reaching orbit, the satellite was assigned its Kosmos designation, and received the International Designator 1972-028A. The North American Aerospace Defense Command assigned it the catalogue number 05938.

Kosmos 485 was the fifty-second of seventy nine DS-P1-Yu satellites to be launched, and the forty-seventh of seventy two to successfully reach orbit. It was operated in an orbit with a perigee of 262 kilometres (163 mi), an apogee of 444 kilometres (276 mi), 70.9 degrees of inclination, and an orbital period of 91.6 minutes. It remained in orbit until it decayed and reentered the atmosphere on 30 August 1972.

== See also ==
- 1972 in spaceflight
