= Kosmos 381 =

Soviet research satellite (Ionosfernaya)

- Mission type: Ionospheric science
- Operator: Soviet space program
- COSPAR ID: 1970-102A
- SATCAT no.: 4783
- Mission duration: 55 years, 3 months, 25 days (in orbit)

Spacecraft properties
- Spacecraft type: Ionosfernaya
- Bus: KAUR-1
- Manufacturer: OKB-10
- Launch mass: 710 kg (1,570 lb)

Start of mission
- Launch date: December 2, 1970, 04:00 UTC
- Rocket: Kosmos-3M 11K65M
- Launch site: Plesetsk 132/2

End of mission
- Disposal: Decommissioned
- Last contact: January 1971
- Decay date: ~3170

Orbital parameters
- Reference system: Geocentric
- Regime: Low Earth orbit
- Perigee altitude: 961 km (597 mi)
- Apogee altitude: 1,007 km (626 mi)
- Inclination: 74°
- Period: 104.8 minutes
Instruments
- -: Cosmic Ray Detector
- -: VLF Receiver
- -: Solar Ultraviolet Detector
- -: Space Radiation Detector
- -: High Frequency Impedance Probe

Cosmos 381 (Russian: Космос 381) artificial satellite provided data on the physical characteristics of the layers of the Earth's Ionosphere using a Mayak radio transmitter. The study covered almost the entire global surface.

== Launch ==
The satellite was launched into a Low Earth Orbit by a Kosmos-3 rocket (11K65M) from the LC–132/2 starting point at Plesetsk Cosmodrome on the 2nd of December, 1970.

== Orbit ==
Orbit was 971km at periapsis and 1013km at apoapsis. Inclination 74 degrees. Decay into the Earth's atmosphere is expected after about 1,200 years.

== See also ==
- 1970 in spaceflight
