= Kosmos 398 =

Second uncrewed test flight of the Soviet lunar module

- LK Lander
- Mission type: Spacecraft test
- Operator: Soviet space program
- COSPAR ID: 1971-016A
- SATCAT no.: 4966
- Mission duration: 24 years, 9 months and 14 days

Spacecraft properties
- Spacecraft: T2K No.2
- Manufacturer: OKB-1
- Launch mass: 7,255 kilograms (15,995 lb)

Start of mission
- Launch date: 26 February 1971, 12:14:00 UTC
- Rocket: Soyuz-L
- Launch site: Baikonur 31/6

End of mission
- Decay date: 10 December 1995

Orbital parameters
- Reference system: Geocentric
- Regime: Low Earth
- Eccentricity: 0.006043
- Perigee altitude: 196 kilometres (122 mi)
- Apogee altitude: 276 kilometres (171 mi)
- Inclination: 51.63°
- Period: 88.9 minutes
- Epoch: 25 February 1971, 19:00:00 UTC

Kosmos 398 (Russian: Космос 398; meaning Cosmos 398), also known as T2K No.2, was the second uncrewed test flight of the Soviet LK lander, using the T2K version. It followed the same program as Kosmos 379, launching on February 26, 1971 into a 276 km by 196 km orbit. It main objective was to validate contingency abort-to-lunar orbit manoeuvres.

== See also ==
- 1971 in spaceflight
