= Strela (satellite) =

Communications satellite constellation

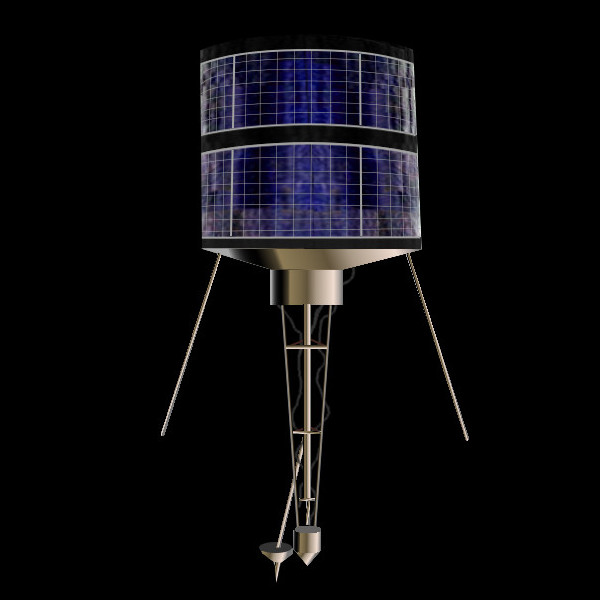
- Strela
- Manufacturer: NPO PM
- Country of origin: Soviet Union; Russia
- Operator: VKS / GRU; VKO
- Applications: Military communications

Specifications
- Power: 40 watts from solar panels
- Batteries: Nickel hydrogen
- Equipment: UHF transponders (NATO B / D band); Data rate of up to 64 kb/s)
- Regime: Low Earth
- Design life: 5 years

Production
- Status: Operational

Related spacecraft
- Derivatives: Gonets (civil satellites)

Strela (Russian: Стрела, for Arrow) is a Russian (previously Soviet) military communications satellite constellation operating in low Earth orbit. These satellites operate as mailboxes ("store-and-forward"): they remember the received messages and then resend them after the scheduled time, or by a command from the Earth. Some sources state the satellites are capable of only three months of active operation, but through coordination with others they can serve for about five years. The satellites are used for transmission of encrypted messages and images.

== History ==
The first three satellites, Kosmos 38 (reentered 8 November 1964), Kosmos 39 (reentered 17 November 1964) and Kosmos 40 (reentered 17 November 1964), were launched on 18 August 1964. Five different types of Strela satellites (six if one counts the Rodnik aka Strela-3M satellites) have been launched, designated Strela-1 (1964–1965), Strela-1M (1970–1992), Strela-2 (1965–1968), Strela-2M (1970–1994), and Strela-3 (1985–2010). Strela satellites are also used for the civilian Gonets program. The current version of Strela, Strela-3M is also known as Rodnik (2005–present).

In 2018 Austrian counterintelligence authorities identified an officer of the Bundesheer, Martin M. as a Russian spy. During the investigation, Austrian counterintelligence found a small suitcase. It had radio-communication equipment built into it so that Martin M. was able to connect to Strela-3 satellites and receive and send encrypted messages. The authorities also found a list of times when the satellite was positioned over Austria.

== Technology ==
The following observations were published in 2011: On 244.512 MHz a Strela-satellite generates a 0.5s long 'trigger pulse' every 60 seconds; the purpose is to activate ground based transmitters waiting to send a message. Satellites were identified by measuring the time of closest approach using a Doppler curve. Received messages are then re-transmitted on the second known frequency at 261.035 MHz.

== Accidents and incidents ==
- At 16:56 UTC on 10 February 2009, Kosmos 2251, a retired Strela-2M, collided with the operational Iridium 33 satellite.
