= 1978 in spaceflight =

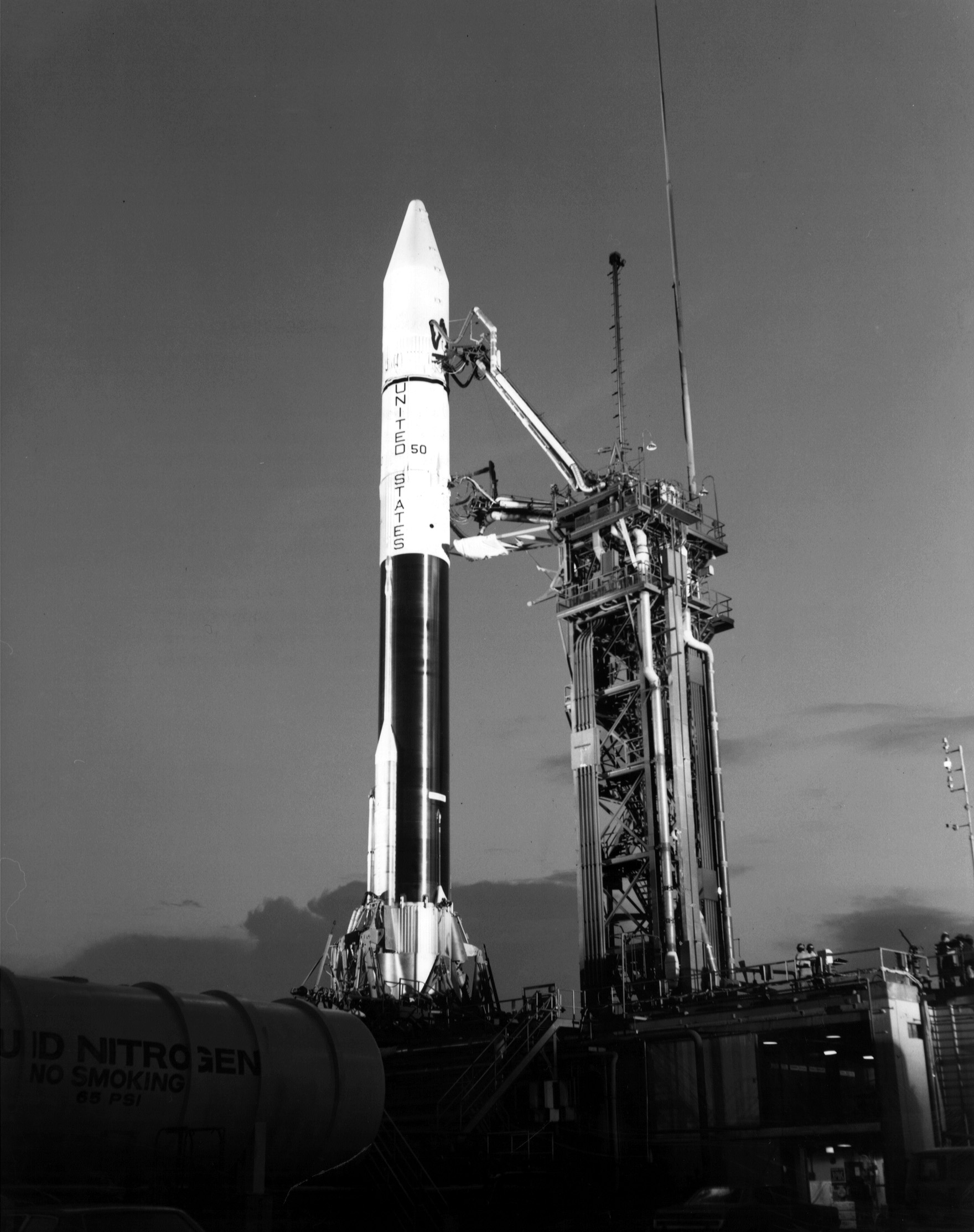
- The Pioneer Venus Orbiter atop an Atlas-Centaur before launch

Orbital launches
- First: 6 January
- Last: 28 December
- Total: 128
- Catalogued: 124

National firsts
- Space traveller: Czechoslovakia; Poland; East Germany DDR

Rockets
- Retirements: Atlas-Agena; Mu-3H

Crewed flights
- Orbital: 5
- Total travellers: 10

1978 in spaceflight

1978 saw the launch of the Pioneer Venus missions launched by the United States, on 20 May and 8 August. The Pioneer Venus Multiprobe landed four spacecraft on the planet, one of which transmitted data for 67 minutes before being destroyed by atmospheric pressure. ISEE-C, which was launched on 8 December, flew past comet 21P/Giacobini–Zinner in 1985, and Halley's Comet in 1986.

== Launches ==
- ← Jan
- Feb
- Mar
- Apr
- May
- Jun
- Jul
- Aug
- Sep
- Oct
- Nov
- Dec →

Date and time (UTC)	Rocket	Flight number	Launch site		LSP	
Date and time (UTC)	Payload (⚀ = CubeSat)	Operator	Orbit	Function	Decay (UTC)	Outcome
Date and time (UTC)	Remarks					
=== January ===
10 January; 12:26:00	(Soviet Union) Soyuz-U		(Soviet Union) Baikonur Site 1/5		(Soviet Union)	
10 January; 12:26:00	(Soviet Union) Soyuz 27		Low Earth (Salyut 6)	Salyut 6 EP-1	16 March; 11:18	Successful
10 January; 12:26:00	Crewed flight with two cosmonauts					
20 January; 08:25	(Soviet Union) Soyuz-U		(Soviet Union) Baikonur Site 31/6		(Soviet Union)	
20 January; 08:25	(Soviet Union) Progress 1		Low Earth (Salyut 6)	Salyut 6 logistics	8 February; 02:00	Successful
20 January; 08:25	Maiden flight of Progress spacecraft. First in-orbit refuel, from Progress to Salyut 6, 2nd Feb.					
26 January; 04:58	(China) Long March 2A		Jiuquan, LA-2/138			
26 January; 04:58	(China) FSW-0 3		Low Earth	Reconnaissance	30 January	Successful
26 January; 04:58	Re-entry capsule recovered on 30 January.					
← Jan; Feb; Mar; Apr; May; Jun; Jul; Aug; Sep; Oct; Nov; Dec →; === February ===
4 February; 07:00	(Japan) M-3H		(Japan) Kagoshima Space Center LP-M		ISAS	
4 February; 07:00	(Japan) EXOS-A (Kyokko)	ISAS	Highly elliptical orbit	Magnetosphere research	In orbit	Successful
← Jan; Feb; Mar; Apr; May; Jun; Jul; Aug; Sep; Oct; Nov; Dec →; === March ===
2 March; 15:28:10	(Soviet Union) Soyuz-U		(Soviet Union) Baikonur Site 1/5		(Soviet Union)	
2 March; 15:28:10	(Soviet Union) Soyuz 28		Low Earth (Salyut 6)	Salyut 6 EP-2	10 March; 11:24	Successful
2 March; 15:28:10	Crewed flight with two cosmonauts, first Czechoslovak in space					
← Jan; Feb; Mar; Apr; May; Jun; Jul; Aug; Sep; Oct; Nov; Dec →; === May ===
20 May; 13:13:00	(United States) Atlas SLV-3D Centaur		(United States) Cape Canaveral LC-36A		(United States)	
20 May; 13:13:00	(United States) Pioneer Venus Orbiter	NASA/ARC	Cytherocentric	Venus orbiter	22 October 1992	Successful
20 May; 13:13:00	Entered 181.6 x 66,360-km orbit around Venus on 4 December 1978.					
← Jan; Feb; Mar; Apr; May; Jun; Jul; Aug; Sep; Oct; Nov; Dec →; === June ===
15 June; 20:16:45	(Soviet Union) Soyuz-U		(Soviet Union) Baikonur Site 1/5		(Soviet Union)	
15 June; 20:16:45	(Soviet Union) Soyuz 29		Low Earth (Salyut 6)	Salyut 6 EO-2	31 September; 11:40	Successful
15 June; 20:16:45	Crewed flight with two cosmonauts					
16 June; 10:49	(United States) Delta 2914		(United States) Cape Canaveral LC-17B		(United States)	
16 June; 10:49	(United States) GOES 3	NOAA	Geostationary	Weather	In orbit	Successful
16 June; 10:49	Decommissioned on 29 June 2016.					
27 June; 15:27:21	(Soviet Union) Soyuz-U		(Soviet Union) Baikonur Site 1/5		(Soviet Union)	
27 June; 15:27:21	(Soviet Union) Soyuz 30		Low Earth (Salyut 6)	Salyut 6 EP-3	5 July; 13:30	Successful
27 June; 15:27:21	Crewed flight with two cosmonauts, first Pole in space					
← Jan; Feb; Mar; Apr; May; Jun; Jul; Aug; Sep; Oct; Nov; Dec →; === August ===
8 August; 07:33	(United States) Atlas SLV-3D Centaur		(United States) Cape Canaveral LC-36A		(United States)	
8 August; 07:33	(United States) Pioneer Venus Multiprobe Bus	NASA/ARC	Heliocentric	Venus atmospheric probe	9 December 1978; 20:22:55	Successful
8 August; 07:33	(United States) Pioneer Venus Large Probe	NASA/ARC	Heliocentric	Venus atmospheric probe	9 December 1978; 19:39:53	Successful
8 August; 07:33	(United States) Pioneer Venus North Probe	NASA/ARC	Heliocentric	Venus atmospheric probe	9 December 1978; 19:42:40	Successful
8 August; 07:33	(United States) Pioneer Venus Night Probe	NASA/ARC	Heliocentric	Venus atmospheric probe	9 December 1978; 19:52:07	Successful
8 August; 07:33	(United States) Pioneer Venus Day Probe	NASA/ARC	Heliocentric	Venus atmospheric probe	9 December 1978; 20:55:34	Successful
8 August; 07:33	Day Probe survived landing, sent data for an additional 67 minutes afterward. First American probe to send data from the surface of Venus.					
12 August; 14:12:00	(United States) Delta 2914		(United States) Cape Canaveral LC-17B		(United States)	
12 August; 14:12:00	(United States) International Sun-Earth Explorer-3 (ISEE-3)/International Cometary Explorer (ICE)	NASA/ESRO	Sun/Earth L_{1} to Heliocentric	Probing interaction of Earth's magnetic field with solar wind, later cometary research	In orbit	Successful
12 August; 14:12:00	First probe stationed at Sun/Earth L_{1} Lagrangian point. Later entered heliocentric orbit, encountering Comet Giacobini–Zinner on 11 September 1985. It would also study Halley's Comet from a distance in 1986.					
26 August; 14:51:30	(Soviet Union) Soyuz-U		(Soviet Union) Baikonur Site 1/5		(Soviet Union)	
26 August; 14:51:30	(Soviet Union) Soyuz 31		Low Earth (Salyut 6)	Salyut 6 EP-4	2 November; 11:04	Successful
26 August; 14:51:30	Crewed flight with two cosmonauts, first East German in space					
← Jan; Feb; Mar; Apr; May; Jun; Jul; Aug; Sep; Oct; Nov; Dec →; === September ===
16 September; 05:00	(Japan) M-3H		(Japan) Kagoshima Space Center LP-M		(Japan) ISAS	
16 September; 05:00	(Japan) EXOS-B (Jikiken)	ISAS	Highly elliptical orbit	Magnetosphere research	23 April 2018	Successful
=== October ===
3 October; 23:09:30	(Soviet Union) Soyuz-U		(Soviet Union) Baikonur Site 31/6		(Soviet Union)	
3 October; 23:09:30	(Soviet Union) Progress 4		Low Earth (Salyut 6)	Salyut 6 logistics	26 October; 16:28	Successful

== Deep Space Rendezvous ==
Date (GMT)	Spacecraft	Event	Remarks
4 December	Pioneer Venus Orbiter	Cytherocentric orbit insertion	
9 December	Pioneer Venus Multiprobe	Venerian atmospheric entry	The bus, one large and three small subprobes
21 December	Venera 12	Venerian landing	
25 December	Venera 11	Venerian landing	

== EVAs ==
Start date/time	Duration	End time	Spacecraft	Crew	Remarks
29 July; 04:00	2 hours 20 minutes	06:20	Salyut 6 PE-2	(Soviet Union) Vladimir Kovalyonok (Soviet Union) Aleksandr Ivanchenkov	Ivanchenkov retrieved samples and experiments attached to the outside of Salyut. Kovalyonok assisted with the retrievals and used a color television camera to transmit EVA images to the ground controllers.
