= 1980 in spaceflight =

- Voyager 1 flew past Saturn on 12 November

Orbital launches
- First: 9 January
- Last: 26 December
- Total: 108
- Successes: 102
- Failures: 6
- Partial failures: 0
- Catalogued: 105

National firsts
- Orbital launch: India
- Space traveller: Hungary; Vietnam; Cuba

Rockets
- Maiden flights: Mu-3S
- Retirements: Thor DSV-2U

Crewed flights
- Orbital: 6
- Total travellers: 13

1980 in spaceflight

The following is an outline of 1980 in spaceflight.

== Launches ==
- ← Jan
- Feb
- Mar
- Apr
- May
- Jun
- Jul
- Aug
- Sep
- Oct
- Nov
- Dec →

Date and time (UTC)	Rocket	Flight number	Launch site		LSP	
Date and time (UTC)	Payload (⚀ = CubeSat)	Operator	Orbit	Function	Decay (UTC)	Outcome
Date and time (UTC)	Remarks					
=== January ===
9 January; 12:15	(Soviet Union) Soyuz-U		(Soviet Union) Plesetsk Site 43/3		(Soviet Union)	
9 January; 12:15	(Soviet Union) Kosmos 1149 (Zenit-6)		Low Earth	Optical imaging	23 January	Successful
11 January; 12:28	(Soviet Union) Molniya-M/ML		(Soviet Union) Plesetsk Site 41/1		(Soviet Union)	
11 January; 12:28	(Soviet Union) Molniya 1-46		Molniya	Communications	22 October 1992	Successful
18 January; 01:26:00	(United States) Atlas SLV-3D Centaur-D1AR		(United States) Cape Canaveral LC-36A		(United States)	
18 January; 01:26:00	(United States) OPS 6293 (FLTSATCOM 3)	US Navy	Geostationary	Communication	In orbit	Successful
14 January; 19:49	(Soviet Union) Kosmos-3M		(Soviet Union) Plesetsk Site 132/2		(Soviet Union)	
14 January; 19:49	(Soviet Union) Kosmos 1150 (Parus)		Low Earth	Navigation	In orbit	Successful
23 January; 07:00	(Soviet Union) Tsyklon-3		(Soviet Union) Plesetsk Site 32/1		(Soviet Union)	
23 January; 07:00	(Soviet Union) Kosmos 1151 (Okean-E No.2)		Low Earth	Technology	In orbit	Successful
23 January; 07:00	Prototype oceanography satellite, not equipped with radar					
24 January; 15:45	(Soviet Union) Soyuz-U		(Soviet Union) Plesetsk Site 43/3		(Soviet Union)	
24 January; 15:45	(Soviet Union) Kosmos 1152 (Yantar-2K No.928)		Low Earth	Optical imaging	6 February	Partial spacecraft failure
25 January; 20:36	(Soviet Union) Kosmos-3M		(Soviet Union) Plesetsk Site 132/2		(Soviet Union)	
25 January; 20:36	(Soviet Union) Kosmos 1153 (Parus)		Low Earth	Navigation	In orbit	Successful
30 January; 12:51	(Soviet Union) Vostok-2M		(Soviet Union) Plesetsk Site 43/4		(Soviet Union)	
30 January; 12:51	(Soviet Union) Kosmos 1154 (Tselina-D)		Low Earth	SIGINT	5 November 2002	Successful
=== February ===
7 February; 11:00	(Soviet Union) Soyuz-U		(Soviet Union) Plesetsk Site 43/4		(Soviet Union)	
7 February; 11:00	(Soviet Union) Kosmos 1155 (Zenit-6)	GRU	Low Earth	Optical imaging	21 February	Successful
7 February; 21:10	(United States) Titan III(23)D		(United States) Vandenberg SLC-4E		(United States)	
7 February; 21:10	(United States) OPS 2581 (KH-11)	NRO	Low Earth	Optical imaging	30 October 1982	Successful
9 February; 23:08	(United States) Atlas E/F-SGS-1		(United States) Vandenberg SLC-3E		(United States)	
9 February; 23:08	(United States) OPS 5117 (Navstar 5)		Medium Earth	Navigation	In orbit	Successful
11 February; 23:32	(Soviet Union) Kosmos-3M		(Soviet Union) Plesetsk Site 132/2		(Soviet Union)	
11 February; 23:32	(Soviet Union) Kosmos 1156 (Strela-1M)		Low Earth	Communication	In orbit	Successful
11 February; 23:32	(Soviet Union) Kosmos 1157 (Strela-1M)		Low Earth	Communication	In orbit	Successful
11 February; 23:32	(Soviet Union) Kosmos 1158 (Strela-1M)		Low Earth	Communication	In orbit	Successful
11 February; 23:32	(Soviet Union) Kosmos 1159 (Strela-1M)		Low Earth	Communication	In orbit	Successful
11 February; 23:32	(Soviet Union) Kosmos 1160 (Strela-1M)		Low Earth	Communication	In orbit	Successful
11 February; 23:32	(Soviet Union) Kosmos 1161 (Strela-1M)		Low Earth	Communication	In orbit	Successful
11 February; 23:32	(Soviet Union) Kosmos 1162 (Strela-1M)		Low Earth	Communication	In orbit	Successful
11 February; 23:32	(Soviet Union) Kosmos 1163 (Strela-1M)		Low Earth	Communication	In orbit	Successful
12 February; 00:53	(Soviet Union) Molniya-M/2BL		(Soviet Union) Plesetsk Site 43/4		(Soviet Union)	
12 February; 00:53	(Soviet Union) Kosmos 1164 (Oko)		Intended: Molniya; Achieved: Highly elliptical	Missile defence	12 February	Launch failure
12 February; 00:53	Upper stage malfunction					
14 February; 15:57	(United States) Delta 3910		(United States) Cape Canaveral LC-17A		(United States)	
14 February; 15:57	(United States) SolarMax	NASA	Low Earth	Solar	2 December 1989	Successful
14 February; 15:57	Spacecraft's attitude control system malfunctioned ten months after launch, subsequently repaired by Space Shuttle Challenger during STS-41-C in April 1984					
17 February; 00:40	(Japan) Mu-3S		(Japan) Kagoshima LA-M		(Japan) ISAS	
17 February; 00:40	(Japan) Tansei-4	ISAS	Low Earth	Technology	12 May 1983	Successful
17 February; 00:40	Maiden flight of Mu-3S					
20 February; 08:05:00	(Soviet Union) Proton-K/DM		(Soviet Union) Baikonur Site 200/39		(Soviet Union)	
20 February; 08:05:00	(Soviet Union) Gran' No.16L (Raduga)		Geosynchronous	Communications	In orbit	Successful
21 February; 12:00	(Soviet Union) Soyuz-U		(Soviet Union) Plesetsk Site 43/4		(Soviet Union)	
21 February; 12:00	(Soviet Union) Kosmos 1165 (Zenit-4MKM)		Low Earth	Optical imaging	5 March	Successful
22 February; 08:35	(Japan) (United States) N-I		(Japan) Tanagashima LA-O		(Japan) NASDA	
22 February; 08:35	(Japan) Ayame-2	NASDA	Intended: Geostationary; Achieved: Transfer	Technology	In orbit	Spacecraft failure
22 February; 08:35	Spacecraft's apogee motor malfunctioned, leaving it with a perigee ~4,000 km (~2,500 mi) short of geostationary orbit.					
=== March ===
3 March; 09:27	(United States) Atlas E/F-MSD		(United States) Vandenberg SLC-3W		(United States)	
3 March; 09:27	(United States) OPS 7245 (MSD)	NRO	Low Earth	Dispenser	In orbit	Successful
3 March; 09:27	(United States) OPS 7245 SSU-1 (NOSS SSU)	NRO	Low Earth	ELINT	In orbit	Successful
3 March; 09:27	(United States) OPS 7245 SSU-2 (NOSS SSU)	NRO	Low Earth	ELINT	In orbit	Successful
3 March; 09:27	(United States) OPS 7245 SSU-3 (NOSS SSU)	NRO	Low Earth	ELINT	2 April 2021; 16:08	Successful
4 March; 10:30	(Soviet Union) Soyuz-U		(Soviet Union) Plesetsk Site 43/4		(Soviet Union)	
4 March; 10:30	(Soviet Union) Kosmos 1166 (Zenit-6)		Low Earth	Optical imaging	18 March	Successful
14 March; 10:40	(Soviet Union) Tsyklon-2		(Soviet Union) Baikonur Site 90		(Soviet Union)	
14 March; 10:40	(Soviet Union) Kosmos 1167 (US-P)		Low Earth	ELINT	1 October 1981	Successful
17 March; 21:37	(Soviet Union) Kosmos-3M		(Soviet Union) Plesetsk Site 132/1		(Soviet Union)	
17 March; 21:37	(Soviet Union) Kosmos 1168 (Tsikada)		Low Earth	Navigation	In orbit	Successful
27 March; 07:30	(Soviet Union) Kosmos-3M		(Soviet Union) Plesetsk Site 132/1		(Soviet Union)	
27 March; 07:30	(Soviet Union) Kosmos 1169 (Taifun-1)		Low Earth	Calibration	3 March 1983	Successful
27 March; 11:38:22	(Soviet Union) Soyuz-U		(Soviet Union) Baikonur Site 31/6		(Soviet Union)	
27 March; 11:38:22	(Soviet Union) Progress 8		Low Earth (Salyut 6)	Station resupply	26 April; 07:40	Successful
=== April ===
1 April; 08:00	(Soviet Union) Soyuz-U		(Soviet Union) Baikonur Site 31/6		(Soviet Union)	
1 April; 08:00	(Soviet Union) Kosmos 1170 (Zenit-4MKM)		Low Earth	Optical imaging	12 April	Successful
3 April; 07:40	(Soviet Union) Kosmos-3M		(Soviet Union) Plesetsk Site 132/2		(Soviet Union)	
3 April; 07:40	(Soviet Union) Kosmos 1171 (Lira)		Low Earth	ASAT target	In orbit	Successful
3 April; 07:40	Target for Kosmos 1174, which failed to intercept it					
9 April; 11:38:22	(Soviet Union) Soyuz-U		(Soviet Union) Baikonur Site 31/6		(Soviet Union)	
9 April; 11:38:22	(Soviet Union) Soyuz 35		Low Earth (Salyut 6)	Salyut 6 EO-4	3 June; 15:06	Successful
9 April; 11:38:22	Crewed flight with two cosmonauts					
12 April; 20:18	(Soviet Union) Molniya-M/2BL		(Soviet Union) Plesetsk Site 41/1		(Soviet Union)	
12 April; 20:18	(Soviet Union) Kosmos 1172 (Oko)		Molniya	Missile defence	26 December 1997	Successful
12 April; 20:18	Replacement for Kosmos 1109					
17 April; 08:30	(Soviet Union) Soyuz-U		(Soviet Union) Baikonur Site 31/6		(Soviet Union)	
17 April; 08:30	(Soviet Union) Kosmos 1173 (Zenit-4MKM)		Low Earth	Optical imaging	28 April	Successful
18 April; 00:51	(Soviet Union) Tsyklon-2		(Soviet Union) Baikonur Site 90		(Soviet Union)	
18 April; 00:51	(Soviet Union) Kosmos 1174 (IS-A)		Low Earth	ASAT test	20 April 1981	Spacecraft failure
18 April; 00:51	Failed to intercept Kosmos 1171					
18 April; 17:31	(Soviet Union) Molniya-M/ML		(Soviet Union) Plesetsk Site 41/1		(Soviet Union)	
18 April; 17:31	(Soviet Union) Kosmos 1175 (Molniya-3 No.26)		Intended: Molniya; Achieved: Low Earth	Communications	29 September	Launch failure
18 April; 17:31	Upper stage malfunction					
26 April; 22:00	(United States) Atlas E/F-SGS-1		(United States) Vandenberg SLC-3E		(United States)	
26 April; 22:00	(United States) OPS 5118 (Navstar 6)	US Air Force	Medium Earth	Navigation	In orbit	Successful
27 April; 06:24:00	(Soviet Union) Soyuz-U		(Soviet Union) Baikonur Site 1/5		(Soviet Union)	
27 April; 06:24:00	(Soviet Union) Progress 9		Low Earth (Salyut 6)	Station resupply	22 May; 01:30	Successful
29 April; 11:40	(Soviet Union) Tsyklon-2		(Soviet Union) Baikonur Site 90		(Soviet Union)	
29 April; 11:40	(Soviet Union) Kosmos 1176 (US-A)		Low Earth	Technology	4 October	Successful
29 April; 11:40	Demonstration of new nuclear reactor safety systems					
29 April; 13:30	(Soviet Union) Soyuz-U		(Soviet Union) Plesetsk Site 43/3		(Soviet Union)	
29 April; 13:30	(Soviet Union) Kosmos 1177 (Yantar-4K1 No.2)		Low Earth	Optical imaging	12 June	Successful
=== May ===
7 May; 13:00	(Soviet Union) Soyuz-U		(Soviet Union) Plesetsk Site 41/1		(Soviet Union)	
7 May; 13:00	(Soviet Union) Kosmos 1178 (Zenit-6)		Low Earth	Optical imaging	22 May	Successful
14 May; 13:00	(Soviet Union) Kosmos-3M		(Soviet Union) Plesetsk Site 132/1		(Soviet Union)	
14 May; 13:00	(Soviet Union) Kosmos 1179 (Taifun-1Yu)		Low Earth	Calibration	18 July 1989	Successful
15 May; 05:35	(Soviet Union) Soyuz-U		(Soviet Union) Plesetsk Site 43/3		(Soviet Union)	
15 May; 05:35	(Soviet Union) Kosmos 1180 (Zenit-4MT)		Low Earth	Optical imaging	26 May	Successful
20 May; 09:21	(Soviet Union) Kosmos-3M		(Soviet Union) Plesetsk Site 132/2		(Soviet Union)	
20 May; 09:21	(Soviet Union) Kosmos 1181 (Parus)		Low Earth	Navigation	In orbit	Successful
23 May; 07:10	(Soviet Union) Soyuz-U		(Soviet Union) Plesetsk Site 43/3		(Soviet Union)	
23 May; 07:10	(Soviet Union) Kosmos 1182 (Zenit-4MKT)		Low Earth	Optical imaging	5 June	Successful
23 May; 14:29:39	(France) Ariane 1		(France) Kourou ELA-1		(France) Arianespace	
23 May; 14:29:39	(France) CAT-2	ESA/Arianespace	Intended: GTO	Test	23 May	Launch failure
23 May; 14:29:39	(West Germany) Firewheel	MPG	Intended: GTO	Magnetospheric	23 May	Launch failure
23 May; 14:29:39	(West Germany) FIRE B	MPG	Intended: GTO	Magnetospheric	23 May	Launch failure
23 May; 14:29:39	(West Germany) FIRE C	MPG	Intended: GTO	Magnetospheric	23 May	Launch failure
23 May; 14:29:39	(West Germany) FIRE D	MPG	Intended: GTO	Magnetospheric	23 May	Launch failure
23 May; 14:29:39	(West Germany) FIRE E	MPG	Intended: GTO	Magnetospheric	23 May	Launch failure
23 May; 14:29:39	(West Germany) Amsat-P3A	Amsat-DE	Intended: Molniya	Amateur radio	23 May	Launch failure
23 May; 14:29:39	First stage failure due to combustion instability in main engine; first launch conducted by Arianespace					
26 May; 18:20:39	(Soviet Union) Soyuz-U		(Soviet Union) Baikonur Site 31/6		(Soviet Union)	
26 May; 18:20:39	(Soviet Union) Soyuz 36		Low Earth (Salyut 6)	Salyut 6 EP-5	31 July; 15:15	Successful
26 May; 18:20:39	Crewed flight with two cosmonauts, first Hungarian in space					
28 May; 12:00	(Soviet Union) Soyuz-U		(Soviet Union) Plesetsk Site 41/1		(Soviet Union)	
28 May; 12:00	(Soviet Union) Kosmos 1183 (Zenit-6)		Low Earth	Optical imaging	11 June	Successful
29 May; 10:53	(United States) Atlas E/F-Star-37S-ISS		(United States) Vandenberg SLC-3W		(United States)	
29 May; 10:53	(United States) NOAA-B	NOAA	Low Earth	Weather	3 May 1981	Launch failure
29 May; 10:53	First stage underperformed due to an engine leaking fuel and running at low thrust. Corrected by onboard guidance extending the duration of first stage flight, however this was not communicated to the upper stage, which attempted to separate at the normal time, whilst the first stage was still firing. Recontact prevented the upper stage orienting for its burn, leading to payload being deployed into useless orbit.					
=== June ===
4 June; 07:34	(Soviet Union) Vostok-2M		(Soviet Union) Plesetsk Site 43/3		(Soviet Union)	
4 June; 07:34	(Soviet Union) Kosmos 1184 (Tselina-D)		Low Earth	SIGINT	29 April 2002	Successful
5 June; 14:19:30	(Soviet Union) Soyuz-U		(Soviet Union) Baikonur Site 31/6		(Soviet Union)	
5 June; 14:19:30	(Soviet Union) Soyuz T-2		Low Earth (Salyut 6)	Salyut 6 EP-6	9 June; 12:39	Successful
5 June; 14:19:30	Crewed flight with two cosmonauts, first crewed flight of Soyuz-T spacecraft					
6 June; 07:00	(Soviet Union) Soyuz-U		(Soviet Union) Plesetsk Site 41/1		(Soviet Union)	
6 June; 07:00	(Soviet Union) Kosmos 1185 (Resurs-F1 No.12)		Low Earth	Remote sensing	20 June	Successful
6 June; 11:00	(Soviet Union) Kosmos-3M		(Soviet Union) Plesetsk Site 132/1		(Soviet Union)	
6 June; 11:00	(Soviet Union) Kosmos 1186 (Taifun-2)		Low Earth	Calibration	1 January 1982	Successful
6 June; 11:00	(Soviet Union) Kosmos 1204 Subsatellite 1		Low Earth	Calibration	24 September	Successful
6 June; 11:00	(Soviet Union) Kosmos 1204 Subsatellite 2		Low Earth	Calibration	14 September	Successful
6 June; 11:00	(Soviet Union) Kosmos 1204 Subsatellite 3		Low Earth	Calibration	3 May 1981	Successful
6 June; 11:00	(Soviet Union) Kosmos 1204 Subsatellite 4		Low Earth	Calibration	3 May 1981	Successful
6 June; 11:00	(Soviet Union) Kosmos 1204 Subsatellite 5		Low Earth	Calibration	1 May 1981	Successful
6 June; 11:00	(Soviet Union) Kosmos 1204 Subsatellite 6		Low Earth	Calibration	3 May 1981	Successful
6 June; 11:00	(Soviet Union) Kosmos 1204 Subsatellite 7		Low Earth	Calibration	3 May 1981	Successful
6 June; 11:00	(Soviet Union) Kosmos 1204 Subsatellite 8		Low Earth	Calibration	3 May 1981	Successful
6 June; 11:00	(Soviet Union) Kosmos 1204 Subsatellite 9		Low Earth	Calibration	3 May 1981	Successful
6 June; 11:00	(Soviet Union) Kosmos 1204 Subsatellite 10		Low Earth	Calibration	3 May 1981	Successful
6 June; 11:00	(Soviet Union) Kosmos 1204 Subsatellite 11		Low Earth	Calibration	28 May 1981	Successful
6 June; 11:00	(Soviet Union) Kosmos 1204 Subsatellite 12		Low Earth	Calibration	20 May 1981	Successful
6 June; 11:00	(Soviet Union) Kosmos 1204 Subsatellite 13		Low Earth	Calibration	22 June 1981	Successful
6 June; 11:00	(Soviet Union) Kosmos 1204 Subsatellite 14		Low Earth	Calibration	18 June 1981	Successful
6 June; 11:00	(Soviet Union) Kosmos 1204 Subsatellite 15		Low Earth	Calibration	27 September 1981	Successful
6 June; 11:00	(Soviet Union) Kosmos 1204 Subsatellite 16		Low Earth	Calibration	22 June 1981	Successful
6 June; 11:00	(Soviet Union) Kosmos 1204 Subsatellite 17		Low Earth	Calibration	18 June 1981	Successful
6 June; 11:00	(Soviet Union) Kosmos 1204 Subsatellite 18		Low Earth	Calibration	17 June 1981	Successful
6 June; 11:00	(Soviet Union) Kosmos 1204 Subsatellite 19		Low Earth	Calibration	September 1981	Successful
6 June; 11:00	(Soviet Union) Kosmos 1204 Subsatellite 20		Low Earth	Calibration	14 June 1981	Successful
6 June; 11:00	(Soviet Union) Kosmos 1204 Subsatellite 21		Low Earth	Calibration	10 June 1981	Successful
6 June; 11:00	(Soviet Union) Kosmos 1204 Subsatellite 22		Low Earth	Calibration	14 June 1981	Successful
6 June; 11:00	(Soviet Union) Kosmos 1204 Subsatellite 23		Low Earth	Calibration	20 June 1981	Successful
6 June; 11:00	(Soviet Union) Kosmos 1204 Subsatellite 24		Low Earth	Calibration	13 June 1981	Successful
6 June; 11:00	Deployed 24 calibration spheres					
12 June; 12:30	(Soviet Union) Soyuz-U		(Soviet Union) Plesetsk Site 41/1		(Soviet Union)	
12 June; 12:30	(Soviet Union) Kosmos 1183 (Zenit-6)		Low Earth	Optical imaging	26 June	Successful
14 June; 00:49:50	(Soviet Union) Proton-K/DM		(Soviet Union) Baikonur Site 200/39		(Soviet Union)	
14 June; 00:49:50	(Soviet Union) Gorizont No.15L		Operational: Geostationary; Current: Graveyard	Communications	In orbit	Successful
14 June; 00:49:50	Operated until 25 October 1988					
14 June; 20:52	(Soviet Union) Molniya-M/2BL		(Soviet Union) Plesetsk Site 43/3		(Soviet Union)	
14 June; 20:52	(Soviet Union) Kosmos 1188 (Oko)		Molniya	Missile defence	In orbit	Spacecraft failure
14 June; 20:52	Replacement for Kosmos 1024, operated for only four months					
18 June; 06:14:12	(Soviet Union) Vostok-2M		(Soviet Union) Baikonur		(Soviet Union)	
18 June; 06:14:12	(Soviet Union) Meteor-Priroda No.3-1		Low Earth	Remote sensing	1 March 1992	Successful
18 June; 18:30	(United States) Titan III(23)D		(United States) Vandenberg SLC-4E		(United States)	
18 June; 18:30	(United States) OPS 3123 (KH-9)	NRO	Low Earth	Optical imaging	6 March 1981	Successful
18 June; 18:30	(United States) OPS 3123 RV-1	NRO	Low Earth	Film return	24 July	Successful
18 June; 18:30	(United States) OPS 3123 RV-2	NRO	Low Earth	Film return	7 September	Successful
18 June; 18:30	(United States) OPS 3123 RV-3	NRO	Low Earth	Film return	24 October	Successful
18 June; 18:30	(United States) OPS 3123 RV-4	NRO	Low Earth	Film return	5 March 1981	Successful
18 June; 18:30	(United States) OPS 3123 RV-5	NRO	Low Earth	Film return	14 October	Successful
18 June; 18:30	All SRVs recovered successfully					
21 June; 18:34	(Soviet Union) Molniya-M/ML		(Soviet Union) Plesetsk Site 41/1		(Soviet Union)	
21 June; 18:34	(Soviet Union) Molniya 1-47		Molniya	Communications	1 April 1991	Successful
26 June; 12:20	(Soviet Union) Soyuz-U		(Soviet Union) Plesetsk Site 41/1		(Soviet Union)	
26 June; 12:20	(Soviet Union) Kosmos 1189 (Zenit-6)		Low Earth	Optical imaging	10 July	Successful
29 June; 04:40:42	(Soviet Union) Soyuz-U		(Soviet Union) Baikonur Site 1/5		(Soviet Union)	
29 June; 04:40:42	(Soviet Union) Progress 10		Low Earth (Salyut 6)	Station resupply	19 July; 02:30	Successful
=== July ===
1 July; 07:12	(Soviet Union) Kosmos-3M		(Soviet Union) Plesetsk Site 132/2		(Soviet Union)	
1 July; 07:12	(Soviet Union) Kosmos 1190 (Strela-2)		Low Earth	Communication	In orbit	Successful
2 July; 00:54	(Soviet Union) Molniya-M/2BL		(Soviet Union) Plesetsk Site 41/1		(Soviet Union)	
2 July; 00:54	(Soviet Union) Kosmos 1191 (Oko)		Molniya	Missile defence	In orbit	Successful
2 July; 00:54	Replacement for Kosmos 1124					
9 July; 00:42	(Soviet Union) Kosmos-3M		(Soviet Union) Plesetsk Site 132/2		(Soviet Union)	
9 July; 00:42	(Soviet Union) Kosmos 1192 (Strela-1M)		Low Earth	Communication	In orbit	Successful
9 July; 00:42	(Soviet Union) Kosmos 1193 (Strela-1M)		Low Earth	Communication	In orbit	Successful
9 July; 00:42	(Soviet Union) Kosmos 1194 (Strela-1M)		Low Earth	Communication	In orbit	Successful
9 July; 00:42	(Soviet Union) Kosmos 1195 (Strela-1M)		Low Earth	Communication	In orbit	Successful
9 July; 00:42	(Soviet Union) Kosmos 1196 (Strela-1M)		Low Earth	Communication	In orbit	Successful
9 July; 00:42	(Soviet Union) Kosmos 1197 (Strela-1M)		Low Earth	Communication	In orbit	Successful
9 July; 00:42	(Soviet Union) Kosmos 1198 (Strela-1M)		Low Earth	Communication	In orbit	Successful
9 July; 00:42	(Soviet Union) Kosmos 1199 (Strela-1M)		Low Earth	Communication	In orbit	Successful
9 July; 12:40	(Soviet Union) Soyuz-U		(Soviet Union) Plesetsk Site 41/1		(Soviet Union)	
9 July; 12:40	(Soviet Union) Kosmos 1200 (Zenit-6)		Low Earth	Optical imaging	23 July	Successful
14 July; 22:35	(Soviet Union) Proton-K/DM		(Soviet Union) Baikonur Site 200/40		(Soviet Union)	
14 July; 22:35	(Soviet Union) Ekran No.19L		Geosynchronous	Communications	In orbit	Successful
15 July; 02:22:11	(United States) Thor DSV-2U		(United States) Vandenberg SLC-10W		(United States)	
15 July; 02:22:11	(United States) DMSP-5D1 F5 (AMS-5)	US Air Force	Intended: Low Earth	Weather	15 July	Launch failure
15 July; 02:22:11	Final flight of Thor DSV-2U, final launch from SLC-10W. Anomaly during second stage separation led to wiring being pulled out of spacecraft. Vehicle also failed to achieve orbit.					
15 July; 07:30	(Soviet Union) Soyuz-U		(Soviet Union) Plesetsk Site 43/3		(Soviet Union)	
15 July; 07:30	(Soviet Union) Kosmos 1201 (Zenit-4MKT)		Low Earth	Optical imaging	28 July	Successful
18 July; 02:33:45	(India) SLV		(India) Sriharikota FLP		(India) ISRO	
18 July; 02:33:45	(India) Rohini RS-1B	ISRO	Low Earth	Technology	20 May 1981	Successful
18 July; 02:33:45	First successful Indian orbital launch					
18 July; 10:37	(Soviet Union) Molniya-M/ML		(Soviet Union) Plesetsk Site 43/3		(Soviet Union)	
18 July; 10:37	(Soviet Union) Molniya 3-13		Molniya	Communications	In orbit	Successful
23 July; 18:33:03	(Soviet Union) Soyuz-U		(Soviet Union) Baikonur Site 1/5		(Soviet Union)	
23 July; 18:33:03	(Soviet Union) Soyuz 37		Low Earth (Salyut 6)	Salyut 6 EP-7	11 October; 09:49	Successful
23 July; 18:33:03	Crewed flight with two cosmonauts, first Vietnamese space traveller					
24 July; 12:40	(Soviet Union) Soyuz-U		(Soviet Union) Plesetsk Site 43/3		(Soviet Union)	
24 July; 12:40	(Soviet Union) Kosmos 1202 (Zenit-6)		Low Earth	Optical imaging	7 August	Successful
31 July; 07:45	(Soviet Union) Soyuz-U		(Soviet Union) Plesetsk Site 43/3		(Soviet Union)	
31 July; 07:45	(Soviet Union) Kosmos 1203 (Resurs-F1 No.12)		Low Earth	Remote sensing	14 August	Successful
31 July; 11:00	(Soviet Union) Kosmos-3M		(Soviet Union) Kapustin Yar Site 107/1		(Soviet Union)	
31 July; 11:00	(Soviet Union) Kosmos 1204 (Taifun-2)		Low Earth	Calibration	23 February 1981	Successful
31 July; 11:00	(Soviet Union) Kosmos 1204 Subsatellite 1		Low Earth	Calibration	11 October	Successful
31 July; 11:00	(Soviet Union) Kosmos 1204 Subsatellite 2		Low Earth	Calibration	14 October	Successful
31 July; 11:00	(Soviet Union) Kosmos 1204 Subsatellite 3		Low Earth	Calibration	31 October	Successful
31 July; 11:00	(Soviet Union) Kosmos 1204 Subsatellite 4		Low Earth	Calibration	24 October	Successful
31 July; 11:00	(Soviet Union) Kosmos 1204 Subsatellite 5		Low Earth	Calibration	24 October	Successful
31 July; 11:00	(Soviet Union) Kosmos 1204 Subsatellite 6		Low Earth	Calibration	26 October	Successful
31 July; 11:00	(Soviet Union) Kosmos 1204 Subsatellite 7		Low Earth	Calibration	3 November	Successful
31 July; 11:00	(Soviet Union) Kosmos 1204 Subsatellite 8		Low Earth	Calibration	3 November	Successful
31 July; 11:00	(Soviet Union) Kosmos 1204 Subsatellite 9		Low Earth	Calibration	4 November	Successful
31 July; 11:00	(Soviet Union) Kosmos 1204 Subsatellite 10		Low Earth	Calibration	10 November	Successful
31 July; 11:00	(Soviet Union) Kosmos 1204 Subsatellite 11		Low Earth	Calibration	27 November	Successful
31 July; 11:00	(Soviet Union) Kosmos 1204 Subsatellite 12		Low Earth	Calibration	18 November	Successful
31 July; 11:00	(Soviet Union) Kosmos 1204 Subsatellite 13		Low Earth	Calibration	18 November	Successful
31 July; 11:00	(Soviet Union) Kosmos 1204 Subsatellite 14		Low Earth	Calibration	23 November	Successful
31 July; 11:00	(Soviet Union) Kosmos 1204 Subsatellite 15		Low Earth	Calibration	3 December	Successful
31 July; 11:00	(Soviet Union) Kosmos 1204 Subsatellite 16		Low Earth	Calibration	19 November	Successful
31 July; 11:00	(Soviet Union) Kosmos 1204 Subsatellite 17		Low Earth	Calibration	17 November	Successful
31 July; 11:00	(Soviet Union) Kosmos 1204 Subsatellite 18		Low Earth	Calibration	17 November	Successful
31 July; 11:00	(Soviet Union) Kosmos 1204 Subsatellite 19		Low Earth	Calibration	16 November	Successful
31 July; 11:00	(Soviet Union) Kosmos 1204 Subsatellite 20		Low Earth	Calibration	23 November	Successful
31 July; 11:00	(Soviet Union) Kosmos 1204 Subsatellite 21		Low Earth	Calibration	14 December	Successful
31 July; 11:00	(Soviet Union) Kosmos 1204 Subsatellite 22		Low Earth	Calibration	13 December	Successful
=== August ===
12 August; 11:50	(Soviet Union) Soyuz-U		(Soviet Union) Plesetsk Site 43/3		(Soviet Union)	
12 August; 11:50	(Soviet Union) Kosmos 1205 (Zenit-6)		Low Earth	Optical imaging	26 August	Successful
15 August; 05:34	(Soviet Union) Vostok-2M		(Soviet Union) Plesetsk Site 43/3		(Soviet Union)	
15 August; 05:34	(Soviet Union) Kosmos 1206 (Tselina-D)		Low Earth	SIGINT	14 January 2002	Successful
22 August; 10:00	(Soviet Union) Soyuz-U		(Soviet Union) Plesetsk Site 41/1		(Soviet Union)	
22 August; 10:00	(Soviet Union) Kosmos 1207 (Zenit-4MKT)		Low Earth	Optical imaging	4 September	Successful
26 August; 15:45	(Soviet Union) Soyuz-U		(Soviet Union) Plesetsk Site 41/1		(Soviet Union)	
26 August; 15:45	(Soviet Union) Kosmos 1208 (Yantar-2K No.927)		Low Earth	Optical imaging	24 September	Successful
26 August; 16:10	(Soviet Union) Soyuz-U		(Soviet Union) Plesetsk Site 41/1		(Soviet Union)	
26 August; 16:10	(Soviet Union) Kosmos 1236 (Yantar-2K No.941)		Low Earth	Optical imaging	21 January 1981	Successful
=== September ===
3 September; 10:20	(Soviet Union) Soyuz-U		(Soviet Union) Plesetsk Site 41/1		(Soviet Union)	
3 September; 10:20	(Soviet Union) Kosmos 1209 (Resurs-F1 No.14)		Low Earth	Remote sensing	17 September	Successful
9 September; 11:00	(Soviet Union) Vostok-2M		(Soviet Union) Plesetsk Site 43/3		(Soviet Union)	
9 September; 11:00	(Soviet Union) Meteor 2-06		Low Earth	Weather	In orbit	Successful
9 September; 22:27	(United States) Delta 3914		(United States) Cape Canaveral LC-17A		(United States)	
9 September; 22:27	(United States) GOES 4 (GOES-D)	NOAA	Operational: Geostationary; Current: Graveyard	Weather	In orbit	Successful
9 September; 22:27	Retired and moved to graveyard orbit on 9 November 1988					
18 September; 19:11:03	(Soviet Union) Soyuz-U		(Soviet Union) Baikonur Site 1/5		(Soviet Union)	
18 September; 19:11:03	(Soviet Union) Soyuz 38		Low Earth (Salyut 6)	Salyut 6 EP-8	26 September; 15:54	Successful
18 September; 19:11:03	Crewed flight with two cosmonauts, first Cuban in space					
19 September; 10:10	(Soviet Union) Soyuz-U		(Soviet Union) Plesetsk Site 41/1		(Soviet Union)	
19 September; 10:10	(Soviet Union) Kosmos 1210 (Zenit-6)		Low Earth	Optical imaging	3 October	Successful
23 September; 10:30	(Soviet Union) Soyuz-U		(Soviet Union) Plesetsk Site 41/1		(Soviet Union)	
23 September; 10:30	(Soviet Union) Kosmos 1211 (Zenit-4MT)		Low Earth	Optical imaging	4 October	Successful
26 September; 10:10	(Soviet Union) Soyuz-U		(Soviet Union) Plesetsk Site 41/1		(Soviet Union)	
26 September; 10:10	(Soviet Union) Kosmos 1212 (Zenit-4MKT)		Low Earth	Optical imaging	9 October	Successful
28 September; 15:09:55	(Soviet Union) Soyuz-U		(Soviet Union) Baikonur Site 1/5		(Soviet Union)	
28 September; 15:09:55	(Soviet Union) Progress 11		Low Earth (Salyut 6)	Station resupply	11 December; 14:45	Successful
=== October ===
3 October; 12:00	(Soviet Union) Soyuz-U		(Soviet Union) Plesetsk Site 41/1		(Soviet Union)	
3 October; 12:00	(Soviet Union) Kosmos 1213 (Zenit-6)		Low Earth	Optical imaging	17 October	Successful
5 October; 17:10	(Soviet Union) Proton-K/DM		(Soviet Union) Baikonur Site 200/39		(Soviet Union)	
5 October; 17:10	(Soviet Union) Gran' No.17L (Raduga)		Geosynchronous	Communications	In orbit	Successful
10 October; 13:10	(Soviet Union) Soyuz-U		(Soviet Union) Plesetsk Site 41/1		(Soviet Union)	
10 October; 13:10	(Soviet Union) Kosmos 1214 (Zenit-4MKM)		Low Earth	Optical imaging	23 October	Successful
10 October; 13:10	Final flight of Zenit-4MKM					
14 October; 20:41	(Soviet Union) Kosmos-3M		(Soviet Union) Plesetsk Site 132/1		(Soviet Union)	
14 October; 20:41	(Soviet Union) Kosmos 1215 (Tselina-O)		Low Earth	SIGINT	12 May 1983	Successful
16 October; 12:20	(Soviet Union) Soyuz-U		(Soviet Union) Plesetsk Site 41/1		(Soviet Union)	
16 October; 12:20	(Soviet Union) Kosmos 1216 (Zenit-6)		Low Earth	Optical imaging	30 October	Successful
16 October; 12:00	(Soviet Union) Soyuz-U		(Soviet Union) Plesetsk Site 41/1		(Soviet Union)	
16 October; 12:00	(Soviet Union) Kosmos 1219 (Zenit-6)		Low Earth	Optical imaging	13 November	Successful
24 October; 10:53	(Soviet Union) Molniya-M/2BL		(Soviet Union) Plesetsk Site 41/1		(Soviet Union)	
24 October; 10:53	(Soviet Union) Kosmos 1217 (Oko)		Molniya	Missile defence	In orbit	Successful
24 October; 10:53	Replacement for Kosmos 1188					
30 October; 10:00	(Soviet Union) Soyuz-U		(Soviet Union) Baikonur Site 31/6		(Soviet Union)	
30 October; 10:00	(Soviet Union) Kosmos 1218 (Yantar-4K1 No.3)		Low Earth	Optical imaging	12 December	Successful
31 October; 03:54	(United States) Atlas SLV-3D Centaur-D1AR		(United States) Cape Canaveral LC-36A		(United States)	
31 October; 03:54	(United States) OPS 6294 (FLTSATCOM 4)	US Navy	Geosynchronous	Communications	In orbit	Successful
=== November ===
4 November; 15:04	(Soviet Union) Tsyklon-2		(Soviet Union) Baikonur Site 90		(Soviet Union)	
4 November; 15:04	(Soviet Union) Kosmos 1220 (US-P)		Low Earth	ELINT	20 June 1982	Successful
12 November; 12:21	(Soviet Union) Soyuz-U		(Soviet Union) Plesetsk Site 41/1		(Soviet Union)	
12 November; 12:21	(Soviet Union) Kosmos 1221 (Zenit-6)		Low Earth	Optical imaging	26 November	Successful
15 November; 22:49	(United States) Delta 3910/PAM-D		(United States) Cape Canaveral LC-17A		(United States)	
15 November; 22:49	(United States) SBS-1	SBS	Operational: Geostationary; Current: Graveyard	Communications	In orbit	Successful
15 November; 22:49	Retired on 22 June 1990 and moved to graveyard orbit					
16 November; 18:34	(Soviet Union) Molniya-M/ML		(Soviet Union) Plesetsk Site 41/1		(Soviet Union)	
16 November; 18:34	(Soviet Union) Molniya 1-48		Molniya	Communications	18 November 1995	Successful
21 November; 11:53	(Soviet Union) Vostok-2M		(Soviet Union) Plesetsk Site 43/3		(Soviet Union)	
21 November; 11:53	(Soviet Union) Kosmos 1222 (Tselina-D)		Low Earth	SIGINT	27 April 2011	Successful
27 November; 21:37	(Soviet Union) Molniya-M/2BL		(Soviet Union) Plesetsk Site 41/1		(Soviet Union)	
27 November; 21:37	(Soviet Union) Kosmos 1223 (Oko)		Molniya	Missile defence	In orbit	Successful
27 November; 21:37	Replacement for Kosmos 903					
27 November; 14:18:28	(Soviet Union) Soyuz-U		(Soviet Union) Baikonur Site 1/5		(Soviet Union)	
27 November; 14:18:28	(Soviet Union) Soyuz T-3		Low Earth (Salyut 6)	Salyut 6 EO-5	10 December; 09:26	Successful
27 November; 14:18:28	Crewed flight with three cosmonauts, first three-man Soyuz flight since 1971					
=== December ===
1 December; 12:15	(Soviet Union) Soyuz-U		(Soviet Union) Plesetsk Site 43/3		(Soviet Union)	
1 December; 12:15	(Soviet Union) Kosmos 1224 (Zenit-6)		Low Earth	Optical imaging	15 December	Successful
5 December; 04:23	(Soviet Union) Kosmos-3M		(Soviet Union) Plesetsk Site 132/1		(Soviet Union)	
5 December; 04:23	(Soviet Union) Kosmos 1225 (Parus)		Low Earth	Navigation	In orbit	Successful
6 December; 23:31	(United States) Atlas SLV 3D Centaur-D1AR		(United States) Cape Canaveral LC-36B		(United States)	
6 December; 23:31	(United Nations) Intelsat V F-2	Intelsat	Geostationary	Communications	In orbit	Successful
9 December; 07:18	(United States) Atlas E/F-MSD		(United States) Vandenberg SLC-3W		(United States)	
9 December; 07:18	(United States) OPS 3255 (MSD)	NRO	Intended: Low Earth	Dispenser	9 December	Launch failure
9 December; 07:18	(United States) OPS 3255 SSU-1 (NOSS SSU)	NRO	Intended: Low Earth	ELINT	9 December	Launch failure
9 December; 07:18	(United States) OPS 3255 SSU-2 (NOSS SSU)	NRO	Intended: Low Earth	ELINT	9 December	Launch failure
9 December; 07:18	(United States) OPS 3255 SSU-3 (NOSS SSU)	NRO	Intended: Low Earth	ELINT	9 December	Launch failure
9 December; 07:18	(United States) LIPS-1	NRL	Intended: Low Earth	Technoilogy	9 December	Launch failure
9 December; 07:18	Booster engine failure led to loss of control, rocket turned around and began flying backwards before exploding.					
10 December; 20:53	(Soviet Union) Kosmos-3M		(Soviet Union) Plesetsk Site 132/1		(Soviet Union)	
10 December; 20:53	(Soviet Union) Kosmos 1226 (Tsikada)		Low Earth	Navigation	In orbit	Successful
13 December; 16:04	(United States) Titan III(34)B		(United States) Vandenberg SLC-4W		(United States)	
13 December; 16:04	(United States) OPS 5805 (SDS)	NRO	Molniya	Communication	30 October 1982	Successful
16 December; 12:15	(Soviet Union) Soyuz-U		(Soviet Union) Plesetsk Site 43/3		(Soviet Union)	
16 December; 12:15	(Soviet Union) Kosmos 1227 (Zenit-6)		Low Earth	Optical imaging	28 December	Successful
23 December; 22:48	(Soviet Union) Kosmos-3M		(Soviet Union) Plesetsk Site 132/1		(Soviet Union)	
23 December; 22:48	(Soviet Union) Kosmos 1228 (Strela-1M)		Low Earth	Communication	In orbit	Successful
23 December; 22:48	(Soviet Union) Kosmos 1229 (Strela-1M)		Low Earth	Communication	In orbit	Successful
23 December; 22:48	(Soviet Union) Kosmos 1230 (Strela-1M)		Low Earth	Communication	In orbit	Successful
23 December; 22:48	(Soviet Union) Kosmos 1231 (Strela-1M)		Low Earth	Communication	In orbit	Successful
23 December; 22:48	(Soviet Union) Kosmos 1232 (Strela-1M)		Low Earth	Communication	In orbit	Successful
23 December; 22:48	(Soviet Union) Kosmos 1233 (Strela-1M)		Low Earth	Communication	In orbit	Successful
23 December; 22:48	(Soviet Union) Kosmos 1234 (Strela-1M)		Low Earth	Communication	In orbit	Successful
23 December; 22:48	(Soviet Union) Kosmos 1235 (Strela-1M)		Low Earth	Communication	In orbit	Successful
25 December; 04:02	(Soviet Union) Molniya-M/SO-L		(Soviet Union) Baikonur Site 31/6		(Soviet Union)	
25 December; 04:02	(Soviet Union) Prognoz 8		Highly elliptical	Solar; Magnetospheric	28 December 1984	Successful
26 December; 11:49	(Soviet Union) Proton-K/DM		(Soviet Union) Baikonur Site 200/40		(Soviet Union)	
26 December; 11:49	(Soviet Union) Ekran No.20L		Geosynchronous	Communications	In orbit	Successful

- ← Jan
- Feb
- Mar
- Apr
- May
- Jun
- Jul
- Aug
- Sep
- Oct
- Nov
- Dec →

== Deep Space Rendezvous ==
Date (GMT)	Spacecraft	Event	Remarks
12 November	Voyager 1	Flyby of Saturn	Closest approach: 124,000 kilometres (77,000 mi)

== Orbital launch statistics ==
=== By country ===
Country	Launches	Successes	Failures	Partial failures
France	1	0	1	0
India	1	1	0	0
Japan	2	2	0	0
Soviet Union	89	87	2	0
United States	15	12	3	0
World	108	102	6	0

=== By rocket ===
==== By family ====
Family	Country	Launches	Successes	Failures	Partial failures	Remarks
Ariane	France	1	0	1	0	
Atlas	United States	8	6	2	0	
Mu	Japan	1	1	0	0	
R-7	Soviet Union	63	61	2	1	
R-14	Soviet Union	16	16	0	0	
R-36	Soviet Union	5	5	0	0	
SLV	India	1	1	0	0	
Thor/Delta	United States	5	4	1	0	Includes N-I
Titan	United States	3	3	0	0	
Universal Rocket	Soviet Union	5	5	0	0	

==== By type ====
Rocket	Country	Family	Launches	Successes	Failures	Partial failures	Remarks
Ariane 1	France	Ariane	1	0	1	0	
Atlas E/F	United States	Atlas	5	3	2	0	
Atlas-Centaur	United States	Atlas	3	3	0	0	
Delta 3000	United States	Thor/Delta	3	3	0	0	
Kosmos	Soviet Union	R-12/R-14	16	16	0	0	
Molniya	Soviet Union	R-7	12	10	2	0	
Mu-3	Japan	Mu	1	1	0	0	
N	Japan/United States	Thor/Delta	1	1	0	0	
Proton	Soviet Union	Universal Rocket	5	5	0	0	
SLV	India	SLV	1	1	0	0	
Soyuz	Soviet Union	R-7	45	45	0	0	
Titan III	United States	Titan	3	3	0	0	
Tsyklon	Soviet Union	R-36	5	5	0	0	
Thor DSV-2U	United States	Thor/Delta	1	0	1	0	Retired
Vostok	Soviet Union	R-7	6	6	0	0	

==== By configuration ====
Rocket	Country	Type	Launches	Successes	Failures	Partial failures	Remarks
Ariane 1	France	Ariane 1	1	0	1	0	
Atlas E/F-MSD	United States	Atlas E/F	2	1	1	0	Retired
Atlas E/F-SGS-1	United States	Atlas E/F	2	2	0	0	Retired
Atlas E/F-Star-37S-ISS	United States	Atlas E/F	1	0	1	0	
Atlas SLV-3D Centaur-D1AR	United States	Atlas-Centaur	3	3	0	0	
Delta 3910	United States	Delta 3000	1	1	0	0	
Delta 3910/PAM-D	United States	Delta 3000	1	1	0	0	
Delta 3914	United States	Delta 3000	1	1	0	0	
Kosmos-3M	Soviet Union	Kosmos	16	16	0	0	
N-I	Japan/United States	N	1	1	0	0	
Mu-3S	Japan	Mu-3	1	1	0	0	Maiden flight
Molniya-M/2BL	Soviet Union	Molniya	6	5	1	0	
Molniya-M/ML	Soviet Union	Molniya	5	4	1	0	
Molniya-M/SO-L	Soviet Union	Molniya	1	1	0	0	
SLV	India	SLV	1	1	0	0	
Proton-K/DM	Soviet Union	Proton	5	5	0	0	
Soyuz-U	Soviet Union	Soyuz	45	45	0	0	
Titan III(34)B	United States	Titan III	1	1	0	0	
Titan III(23)D	United States	Titan III	2	2	0	0	
Thor DSV-2U	United States	Thor DSV-2U	1	0	1	0	Retired
Tsyklon-2	Soviet Union	Tsyklon	4	4	0	0	
Tsyklon-3	Soviet Union	Tsyklon	1	1	0	0	
Vostok-2M	Soviet Union	Vostok	6	6	0	0	

=== By launch site ===
Site	Country	Launches	Successes	Failures	Partial failures	Remarks
Baikonur	Soviet Union	24	24	0	0	
Cape Canaveral	United States	6	6	0	0	
Kourou	France	1	0	1	0	
Kagoshima	Japan	1	1	0	0	
Kapustin Yar	Soviet Union	1	1	0	0	
Plesetsk	Soviet Union	64	62	2	0	
Sriharikota	India	1	1	0	0	
Tanegashima	Japan	1	1	0	0	
Vandenberg	United States	9	6	3	0	

=== By orbit ===
Orbital regime	Launches	Achieved	Not Achieved	Accidentally achieved	Remarks
Low Earth	82	80	2	1	
Medium Earth	2	2	0	0	
Geosynchronous/transfer	11	10	1	0	
High Earth	13	12	1	0	Including highly elliptical (HEO) and Molniya orbits, one launch to Molniya orbit ended up in HEO
