= Progress 10 =

Soviet unmanned Progress cargo spacecraft

- A Progress 7K-TG spacecraft
- Mission type: Salyut 6 resupply
- COSPAR ID: 1980-055A
- SATCAT no.: 11867

Spacecraft properties
- Spacecraft: Progress (No.110)
- Spacecraft type: Progress 7K-TG
- Manufacturer: NPO Energia

Start of mission
- Launch date: 29 June 1980, 04:40:42 UTC
- Rocket: Soyuz-U
- Launch site: Baikonur, Site 1/5

End of mission
- Disposal: Deorbited
- Decay date: 19 July 1980, 01:47 UTC

Orbital parameters
- Reference system: Geocentric
- Regime: Low Earth
- Perigee altitude: 183 km
- Apogee altitude: 264 km
- Inclination: 51.6°
- Period: 89.0 minutes
- Epoch: 29 June 1980

Docking with Salyut 6
- Docking port: Aft
- Docking date: 1 July 1980, 05:53 UTC
- Undocking date: 17 July 1980, 22:21 UTC

Progress 10 (Russian: Прогресс 10) was a Soviet unmanned Progress cargo spacecraft, which was launched in June 1980 to resupply the Salyut 6 space station.

== Spacecraft ==
Progress 10 was a Progress 7K-TG spacecraft. The tenth of forty three to be launched, it had the serial number 110. The Progress 7K-TG spacecraft was the first generation Progress, derived from the Soyuz 7K-T and intended for uncrewed logistics missions to space stations in support of the Salyut programme. On some missions the spacecraft were also used to adjust the orbit of the space station.

The Progress spacecraft had a dry mass of 6,520 kilograms (14,370 lb), which increased to around 7,020 kilograms (15,480 lb) when fully fuelled. It measured 7.48 metres (24.5 ft) in length, and 2.72 metres (8 ft 11 in) in diameter. Each spacecraft could accommodate up to 2,500 kilograms (5,500 lb) of payload, consisting of dry cargo and propellant. The spacecraft were powered by chemical batteries, and could operate in free flight for up to three days, remaining docked to the station for up to thirty.

== Launch ==
Progress 10 launched on 29 June 1980 from the Baikonur Cosmodrome in the Kazakh SSR. It used a Soyuz-U rocket.

== Docking ==
Progress 10 docked with the aft port of Salyut 6 on 1 July 1980 at 05:53 UTC, and was undocked on 17 July 1980 at 22:21 UTC.

== Decay ==
It remained in orbit until 19 July 1980, when it was deorbited. The deorbit burn occurred at 01:47 UTC and the mission ended at around 02:30 UTC.

== See also ==
- 1980 in spaceflight
- List of Progress missions
- List of uncrewed spaceflights to Salyut space stations
