= Progress 5 =

Soviet unmanned Progress cargo spacecraft

- A Progress 7K-TG spacecraft
- Mission type: Salyut 6 resupply
- Operator: OKB-1
- COSPAR ID: 1979-022A
- SATCAT no.: 11292
- Mission duration: 24 days

Spacecraft properties
- Spacecraft: Progress s/n 104
- Spacecraft type: Progress 7K-TG
- Manufacturer: NPO Energia
- Launch mass: 7020 kg
- Dry mass: 6520 kg
- Payload mass: 2500 kg
- Dimensions: 7.48 m in length and 2.72 m in diameter

Start of mission
- Launch date: 12 March 1979, 05:47:28 UTC
- Rocket: Soyuz-U s/n Ye15000-162
- Launch site: Baikonur, Site 31/6
- Contractor: OKB-1

End of mission
- Disposal: Deorbited
- Decay date: 5 April 1979, 01:04 UTC

Orbital parameters
- Reference system: Geocentric
- Regime: Low Earth
- Perigee altitude: 189 km
- Apogee altitude: 256 km
- Inclination: 51.66°
- Period: 88.8 minutes
- Epoch: 12 March 1979

Docking with Salyut 6
- Docking port: Aft
- Docking date: 14 March 1979, 07:19:21 UTC
- Undocking date: 3 April 1979, 16:10:00 UTC
- Time docked: 20.4 days

Cargo
- Mass: 2500 kg

Progress 5 (Russian: Прогресс 5), was a Soviet unmanned Progress cargo spacecraft which was launched in 1979 to resupply the Salyut 6 space station. Served as a receptacle for contaminated fuel from the damaged Salyut 6 propulsion system.

== Spacecraft ==
Progress 5 was a Progress 7K-TG spacecraft. The fifth of forty three to be launched, it had the serial number 104. The Progress 7K-TG spacecraft was the first generation Progress, derived from the Soyuz 7K-T and intended for uncrewed logistics missions to space stations in support of the Salyut programme. On some missions the spacecraft were also used to adjust the orbit of the space station.

The Progress spacecraft had a dry mass of 6,520 kilograms (14,370 lb), which increased to around 7,020 kilograms (15,480 lb) when fully fuelled. It measured 7.48 metres (24.5 ft) in length, and 2.72 metres (8 ft 11 in) in diameter. Each spacecraft could accommodate up to 2,500 kilograms (5,500 lb) of payload, consisting of dry cargo and propellant. The spacecraft were powered by chemical batteries, and could operate in free flight for up to three days, remaining docked to the station for up to thirty.

== Launch ==
Progress 5 launched on 12 March 1979 from the Baikonur Cosmodrome in the Kazakh Soviet Socialist Republic. It used a Soyuz-U rocket.

== Docking ==
Progress 5 docked with Salyut 6 on 14 March 1979 at 07:19:21 UTC.

== Decay ==
It remained in orbit until 5 April 1979, when it was deorbited. The deorbit burn occurred at 01:04 UTC.

== See also ==
- 1979 in spaceflight
- List of Progress missions
- List of uncrewed spaceflights to Salyut space stations
