= Kosmos 1188 =

Soviet military early warning satellite

- Mission type: Early warning
- COSPAR ID: 1980-050A
- SATCAT no.: 11844
- Mission duration: 4 years

Spacecraft properties
- Spacecraft type: US-K
- Launch mass: 1,900 kilograms (4,200 lb)

Start of mission
- Launch date: 14 June 1980, 20:52 UTC
- Rocket: Molniya-M/2BL
- Launch site: Plesetsk Cosmodrome

End of mission
- Deactivated: 28 October 1980
- Decay date: 24 May 2013

Orbital parameters
- Reference system: Geocentric
- Regime: Molniya
- Perigee altitude: 665 kilometres (413 mi)
- Apogee altitude: 39,679 kilometres (24,655 mi)
- Inclination: 62.8 degrees
- Period: 717.56 minutes

Kosmos 1188 (Russian: Космос 1188 meaning Cosmos 1188) was a Soviet US-K missile early warning satellite which was launched in 1980 as part of the Soviet military's Oko programme. The satellite was designed to identify missile launches using optical telescopes and infrared sensors. It re-entered on May 24, 2013.

Kosmos 1188 was launched from Site 41/3 at Plesetsk Cosmodrome in the Russian SSR. A Molniya-M carrier rocket with a 2BL upper stage was used to perform the launch, which took place at 20:52 UTC on 14 June 1980. The launch successfully placed the satellite into a molniya orbit. It subsequently received its Kosmos designation, and the international designator 1980-050A. The United States Space Command assigned it the Satellite Catalog Number 11844.

Its June 1980 launch was noted for triggering reports of a dolphin shaped UFO. The launch created so many UFO reports, they revealed the satellite's approximate orbital inclination (about 62.5 degrees). Some of the sightings may have been sunlight reflecting of fourth-stage exhaust contrails. NBC noted the sightings's appearance in the Weinstein list.

== See also ==
- 1980 in spaceflight
- List of Kosmos satellites (1001–1250)
- List of Oko satellites
- List of R-7 launches (1980-1984)
