= Progress 8 =

Soviet unmanned Progress cargo spacecraft

- A Progress 7K-TG spacecraft
- Mission type: Salyut 6 resupply
- Operator: OKB-1
- COSPAR ID: 1980-024A
- SATCAT no.: 11743
- Mission duration: 30 days

Spacecraft properties
- Spacecraft: Progress s/n 108
- Spacecraft type: Progress 7K-TG
- Manufacturer: NPO Energia
- Launch mass: 7020 kg
- Dry mass: 6520 kg
- Payload mass: 2500 kg
- Dimensions: 7.48 m in length and 2.72 m in diameter

Start of mission
- Launch date: 27 March 1980, 18:53:31 UTC
- Rocket: Soyuz-U s/n Zh15000-200
- Launch site: Baikonur, 31/6
- Contractor: OKB-1

End of mission
- Disposal: Deorbited
- Decay date: 26 April 1980, 06:54 UTC

Orbital parameters
- Reference system: Geocentric
- Regime: Low Earth
- Perigee altitude: 154.0 km
- Apogee altitude: 186.0 km
- Inclination: 51.66°
- Period: 87.80 minutes
- Epoch: 27 March 1980

Docking with Salyut 6
- Docking port: Aft
- Docking date: 29 March 1980, 20:01:00 UTC
- Undocking date: 25 April 1980, 08:04:00 UTC
- Time docked: 26.5 days

Cargo
- Mass: 2500 kg

Progress 8 (Russian: Прогресс 8), was a Soviet uncrewed Progress cargo spacecraft which was launched in 1980 to resupply the Salyut 6 space station.

== Spacecraft ==
Progress 8 was a Progress 7K-TG spacecraft. The eighth of forty three to be launched, it had the serial number 108. The Progress 7K-TG spacecraft was the first generation Progress, derived from the Soyuz 7K-T and intended for uncrewed logistics missions to space stations in support of the Salyut programme. On some missions the spacecraft were also used to adjust the orbit of the space station.

The Progress spacecraft had a dry mass of 6,520 kilograms (14,370 lb), which increased to around 7,020 kilograms (15,480 lb) when fully fuelled. It measured 7.48 metres (24.5 ft) in length, and 2.72 metres (8 ft 11 in) in diameter. Each spacecraft could accommodate up to 2,500 kilograms (5,500 lb) of payload, consisting of dry cargo and propellant. The spacecraft were powered by chemical batteries, and could operate in free flight for up to three days, remaining docked to the station for up to thirty.

== Launch ==
Progress 8 launched on 27 March 1980 from the Baikonur Cosmodrome in the Kazakh Soviet Socialist Republic. It used a Soyuz-U rocket.

== Docking ==
Progress 8 docked with Salyut 6 on 29 March 1980 at 20:01 UTC.

== See also ==
- 1980 in spaceflight
- List of Progress missions
- List of uncrewed spaceflights to Salyut space stations
