= 1979 in spaceflight =

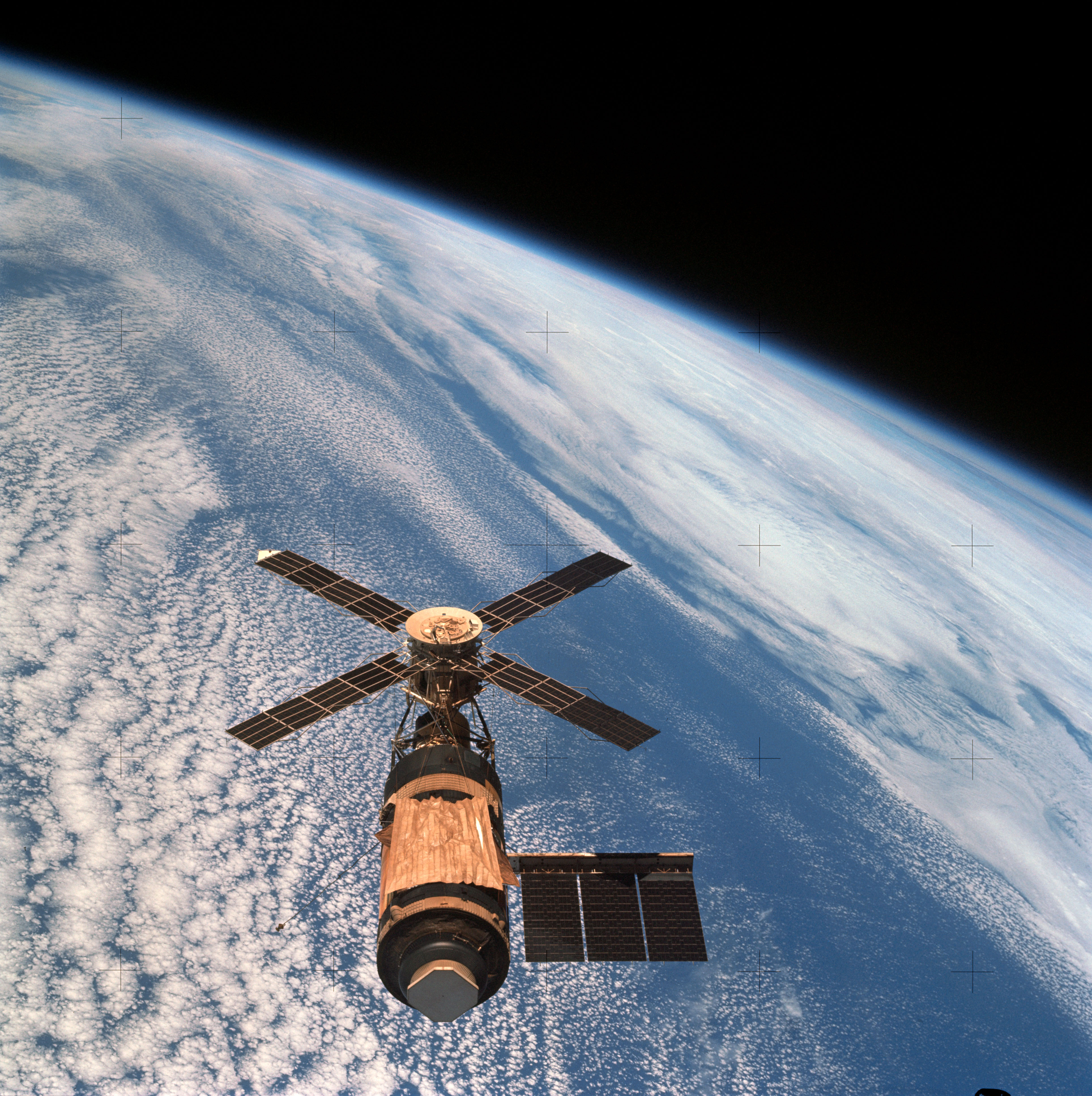
- The Skylab space station, which decayed from orbit on 11 July

Orbital launches
- First: 11 January
- Last: 28 December
- Total: 110
- Catalogued: 106

National firsts
- Space traveller: Bulgaria

Rockets
- Maiden flights: Ariane 1 Scout G-1; SLV
- Retirements: Delta 2000; Mu-3C; Scout D-1

Crewed flights
- Orbital: 2
- Total travellers: 4

1979 in spaceflight

The following is an outline of 1979 in spaceflight.

== Launches ==
- ← Jan
- Feb
- Mar
- Apr
- May
- Jun
- Jul
- Aug
- Sep
- Oct
- Nov
- Dec →

Date and time (UTC)	Rocket	Flight number	Launch site		LSP	
Date and time (UTC)	Payload (⚀ = CubeSat)	Operator	Orbit	Function	Decay (UTC)	Outcome
Date and time (UTC)	Remarks					
=== January ===
11 January; 15:07	(Soviet Union) Soyuz-U		(Soviet Union) Plesetsk Cosmodrome LC43/3		(Soviet Union)	
11 January; 15:07	(Soviet Union) Kosmos 1070		Low Earth (62.8 degrees inclination)	Reconnaissance	20 January 1979	Successful
11 January; 15:07	Military payload (5500 kg)					
13 January; 15:30	(Soviet Union) Soyuz-U		(Soviet Union) Plesetsk Cosmodrome LC43/4		(Soviet Union)	
13 January; 15:30	(Soviet Union) Kosmos 1071		Low Earth (62.8 degrees inclination)		unknown	Successful
13 January; 15:30	Military payload (6000 kg)					
16 January; 17:37	(Soviet Union) Kosmos-3M		(Soviet Union) Plesetsk Cosmodrome LC132/1		(Soviet Union)	
16 January; 17:37	(Soviet Union) Kosmos 1072 (Parus #17)		Low Earth (82.9 degrees inclination)	Navigation	unknown	Successful
16 January; 17:37	Military payload (810 kg)					
18 January; 15:42	(Soviet Union) Molniya-M		(Soviet Union) Plesetsk Cosmodrome LC43/4		(Soviet Union)	
18 January; 15:42	(Soviet Union) Molniya 3-11		Extremely elliptical orbit (64.1 degrees inclination)	Communications	unknown	Successful
18 January; 15:42	Civilian payload (1750 kg)					
25 January; 05:43	(Soviet Union) Vostok-2M		(Soviet Union) Baikonur Cosmodrome Site 31/6		(Soviet Union)	
25 January; 05:43	(Soviet Union) Meteor-Priroda 2-3 (Meteor-1 29)		SSO	Meteorology	unknown	Successful
25 January; 05:43	Civilian payload (1100 kg)					
30 January; 15:15	(Soviet Union) Soyuz-U		(Soviet Union) Plesetsk Cosmodrome LC43/4		(Soviet Union)	
30 January; 15:15	(Soviet Union) Kosmos 1073		Low Earth (62.8 degrees inclination)		unknown	Successful
30 January; 15:15	Military payload (6000 kg)					
30 January; 21:42	(United States) Delta 2914		(United States) Cape Canaveral pad LC 17B		(United States) McDonnell Douglas	
30 January; 21:42	(United States) SCATHA	USAF	Extremely Elliptical Orbit (4.9 degrees inclination)	Communications; Technology demo	In orbit	Successful
30 January; 21:42	Experimental military payload (360 kg)					
31 January; 09:00:00	(Soviet Union) Soyuz-U		(Soviet Union) Baikonur Cosmodrome Site 31/6		(Soviet Union)	
31 January; 09:00:00	(Soviet Union) Kosmos 1074		Low Earth (51.6 degrees inclination)	Test flight	unknown	Successful
31 January; 09:00:00	Military payload (7000 kg)					
← Jan; Feb; Mar; Apr; May; Jun; Jul; Aug; Sep; Oct; Nov; Dec →; === February ===
6 February; 08:46	(Japan) N-I		(Japan) Tanegashima, Osaki launch complex		(Japan)	
6 February; 08:46	(Japan) Ayame 1 (ECS A)	NASDA	Extremely Elliptical Orbit (0.7 degrees inclination)	Communications	unknown	Partial failure
6 February; 08:46	Civilian payload (260 kg). Spacecraft has failed 9 February 1979 during apogee kick motor burn after recontact with 3rd stage					
8 February; 10:00	(Soviet Union) Kosmos-3M		(Soviet Union) Plesetsk Cosmodrome LC132/2		(Soviet Union)	
8 February; 10:00	(Soviet Union) Kosmos 1075		Low Earth (65.8 degrees inclination)	Radar calibration	unknown	Successful
8 February; 10:00	Military payload (1080 kg)					
12 February; 13:00:00	(Soviet Union) Tsyklon-3		(Soviet Union) Plesetsk Cosmodrome LC32/2		(Soviet Union)	
12 February; 13:00:00	(Soviet Union) Kosmos 1076		Low Earth (82.5 degrees inclination)	Earth observation	unknown	Successful
12 February; 13:00:00	Military payload (1900 kg)					
13 February; 21:41	(Soviet Union) Vostok-2M		(Soviet Union) Plesetsk Cosmodrome LC43/4		(Soviet Union)	
13 February; 21:41	(Soviet Union) Kosmos 1077		Low Earth (81.2 degrees inclination)		unknown	Successful
13 February; 21:41	Military payload (2500 kg)					
16 February; 15:00	(Soviet Union) Soyuz-U		(Soviet Union) Plesetsk Cosmodrome LC41/1		(Soviet Union)	
16 February; 15:00	(Soviet Union) Kosmos (number not assigned)		no		16 February 1979	Failed to reach orbit
16 February; 15:00	Military payload					
18 February; 18:59:00	(United States) Scout D-1 S202C		(United States) Wallops LA-3A		(United States) NASA	
18 February; 18:59:00	(United States) SAGE	NASA	Low Earth (54.9 degrees inclination)	Earth observation	11 April 1989	Successful
18 February; 18:59:00	Civilian payload (148.7 kg)					
21 February; 05:00	(Japan) Mu-3C		(Japan) Tanegashima, Mu launch complex		(Japan)	
21 February; 05:00	(Japan) Hakucho (CORSA B)	ISAS	Low Earth (29.9 degrees inclination)	X-ray astronomy	16 April 1985	Successful
21 February; 05:00	Civilian payload (100 kg)					
21 February; 07:49:00	(Soviet Union) Proton-K/DM		(Soviet Union) Baikonur Cosmodrome, Site 200/40		(Soviet Union)	
21 February; 07:49:00	(Soviet Union) Ekran 3		GEO	Satellite television	unknown	Successful
21 February; 07:49:00	Civilian payload (1970 kg)					
22 February; 12:10	(Soviet Union) Soyuz-U		(Soviet Union) Plesetsk Cosmodrome LC41/1		(Soviet Union)	
22 February; 12:10	(Soviet Union) Kosmos 1078		Low Earth (72.9 degrees inclination)		unknown	Successful
22 February; 12:10	Military payload (6000 kg)					
24 February; 08:20	(United States) Atlas F OIS	27F	(United States) Vandenberg AFB SLC-3W		(United States) USAF	
24 February; 08:20	(United States) Solwind (P78-1)	USAF STP	Low Earth (97.8 degrees inclination)	Solar physics research	13 September 1985	Destroyed by ASAT
24 February; 08:20	Military payload (1331 kg)					
25 February; 11:53:49	(Soviet Union) Soyuz-U		(Soviet Union) Baikonur Site 31/6		(Soviet Union)	
25 February; 11:53:49	(Soviet Union) Soyuz 32		Low Earth (Salyut 6)	Salyut 6 EO-3	13 June; 16:18:26	Successful
25 February; 11:53:49	Crewed flight launching with two cosmonauts, remained in orbit past design life due to Soyuz 33 failure, returned to Earth uncrewed					
27 February; 15:00	(Soviet Union) Soyuz-U		(Soviet Union) Plesetsk Cosmodrome LC43/3		(Soviet Union)	
27 February; 15:00	(Soviet Union) Kosmos 1079		Low Earth (67.1 degrees inclination)		unknown	Successful
27 February; 15:00	Military payload (6700 kg)					
27 February; 17:00	(Soviet Union) Kosmos-3M		(Soviet Union) Plesetsk Cosmodrome pad LC 132/2		(Soviet Union)	
27 February; 17:00	(Soviet Union) Interkosmos 19	Interkosmos	Low Earth (74.0 degrees inclination)	Ionospheric research	unknown	Successful
27 February; 17:00	Civilian payload (1015 kg). Collaboration between USSR, Bulgaria, Czechoslovakia, Hungary, and Poland.					
← Jan; Feb; Mar; Apr; May; Jun; Jul; Aug; Sep; Oct; Nov; Dec →; === March ===
1 March; 18:45:00	(Soviet Union) Vostok-M		(Soviet Union) Plesetsk Cosmodrome LC43/4		(Soviet Union)	
1 March; 18:45:00	(Soviet Union) Meteor-2-4		Low Earth (81.2 degrees inclination)		unknown	Successful
1 March; 18:45:00	Civilian payload (1300 kg)					
12 March; 05:47:28	(Soviet Union) Soyuz-U		(Soviet Union) Baikonur Cosmodrome pad LC 31		(Soviet Union)	
12 March; 05:47:28	(Soviet Union) Progress 5		Salyut 6 orbit (Low Earth (51.6 degrees inclination))		unknown	Successful
12 March; 05:47:28	Civilian payload (7020 kg)					
14 March; 10:50	(Soviet Union) Soyuz-U		(Soviet Union) Plesetsk Cosmodrome unknown pad		(Soviet Union)	
14 March; 10:50	(Soviet Union) Kosmos 1080		Low Earth (72.8 degrees inclination)		unknown	Successful
14 March; 10:50	Military payload (6700 kg)					
15 March; 02:58	(Soviet Union) Kosmos-3M		(Soviet Union) Plesetsk Cosmodrome unknown pad		(Soviet Union)	
15 March; 02:58	(Soviet Union) Kosmos 1081–1088		Low Earth (74.0 degrees inclination)		unknown	Successful
15 March; 02:58	Military payload (8x61 kg)					
16 March; 18:30	(United States) Titan 3D		(United States) Vandenberg pad SLC 4E		(United States)	
16 March; 18:30	(United States) unknown		SSO		unknown	Successful
16 March; 18:30	Military payload (13300 kg to SSO, 60 kg to LEO (95.8 degrees))					
21 March; 04:13	(Soviet Union) Kosmos-3M		(Soviet Union) Plesetsk Cosmodrome unknown pad		(Soviet Union)	
21 March; 04:13	(Soviet Union) Kosmos 1089		Low Earth (83.0 degrees inclination)		unknown	Successful
21 March; 04:13	Military payload (810 kg)					
31 March; 10:45	(Soviet Union) Soyuz-U		(Soviet Union) Plesetsk Cosmodrome unknown pad		(Soviet Union)	
31 March; 10:45	(Soviet Union) Kosmos 1090		Low Earth (72.9 degrees inclination)		unknown	Successful
31 March; 10:45	Military payload (5500 kg)					
← Jan; Feb; Mar; Apr; May; Jun; Jul; Aug; Sep; Oct; Nov; Dec →; === April ===
7 April; 06:20	(Soviet Union) Kosmos-3M		(Soviet Union) Plesetsk Cosmodrome unknown pad		(Soviet Union)	
7 April; 06:20	(Soviet Union) Kosmos 1091		Low Earth (82.9 degrees inclination)		unknown	Successful
7 April; 06:20	Military payload (810 kg)					
10 April; 17:34:34	(Soviet Union) Soyuz-U		(Soviet Union) Baikonur Site 31/6		(Soviet Union)	
10 April; 17:34:34	(Soviet Union) Soyuz 33		Low Earth (Intended: Salyut 6)	Taxi flight	12 April; 16:35	Spacecraft failure
10 April; 17:34:34	Crewed flight with two cosmonauts, first Bulgarian in space, main engine failed during rendezvous manoeuvres, docking aborted and spacecraft deorbited using backup engines					
11 April; 21:51	(Soviet Union) Kosmos-3M		(Soviet Union) Plesetsk Cosmodrome unknown pad		(Soviet Union)	
11 April; 21:51	(Soviet Union) Kosmos 1092		Low Earth (82.9 degrees inclination)		unknown	Successful
11 April; 21:51	Military payload (810 kg)					
12 April; 00:28:00	(Soviet Union) Molniya-M		(Soviet Union) Plesetsk Cosmodrome unknown pad		(Soviet Union)	
12 April; 00:28:00	(Soviet Union) Molniya 1-43		Extremely Elliptical Orbit (64.9 degrees inclination)		unknown	Successful
12 April; 00:28:00	Civilian payload (1600 kg)					
14 April; 05:27	(Soviet Union) Vostok-M		(Soviet Union) Plesetsk Cosmodrome LC43/3		(Soviet Union)	
14 April; 05:27	(Soviet Union) Kosmos 1093		Low Earth (81.3 degrees inclination)	ELINT	23 March 2000	Successful
14 April; 05:27	Military payload (2500 kg)					
18 April; 12:00	(Soviet Union) Tsyklon-2(Cyclone-2)		(Soviet Union) Baikonur Cosmodrome pad LC 90		(Soviet Union)	
18 April; 12:00	(Soviet Union) Kosmos 1094		Low Earth (65.0 degrees inclination)		unknown	Successful
18 April; 12:00	Military payload (3000 kg)					
20 April; 11:30	(Soviet Union) Soyuz-U		(Soviet Union) Plesetsk Cosmodrome LC43/3		(Soviet Union)	
20 April; 11:30	(Soviet Union) Kosmos 1095		Low Earth (72.8 degrees inclination)		unknown	Successful
20 April; 11:30	Military payload (6000 kg)					
25 April; 03:44:00	(Soviet Union) Proton-K/DM		(Soviet Union) Baikonur Cosmodrome, pad LC 200P (pad 40)		(Soviet Union)	
25 April; 03:44:00	(Soviet Union) Raduga 5		GEO		unknown	Successful
25 April; 03:44:00	Military payload (1965 kg)					
25 April; 10:00	(Soviet Union) Tsyklon-2(Cyclone-2)		(Soviet Union) Baikonur Cosmodrome pad LC 90		(Soviet Union)	
25 April; 10:00	(Soviet Union) Kosmos 1096		Low Earth (65.0 degrees inclination)		unknown	Successful
25 April; 10:00	Military payload (4000 kg)					
27 April; 17:15	(Soviet Union) Soyuz-U		(Soviet Union) Plesetsk Cosmodrome LC43/3		(Soviet Union)	
27 April; 17:15	(Soviet Union) Kosmos 1097		Low Earth (62.7 degrees inclination)		unknown	Successful
27 April; 17:15	Military payload (6700 kg)					
← Jan; Feb; Mar; Apr; May; Jun; Jul; Aug; Sep; Oct; Nov; Dec →; === May ===
4 May; 18:57:00	(United States) Atlas SLV 3D		(United States) Cape Canaveral pad LC 36A		(United States)	
4 May; 18:57:00	(United States) Fltsatcom-2		GTO		unknown	Successful
4 May; 18:57:00	Military payload (1884 kg)					
13 May; 04:17:10	(Soviet Union) Soyuz-U		(Soviet Union) Baikonur Cosmodrome pad LC 31		(Soviet Union)	
13 May; 04:17:10	(Soviet Union) Progress 6		Salyut 6 orbit (51.6 degrees inclination)		unknown	Successful
13 May; 04:17:10	Civilian payload (7020 kg)					
15 May; 11:40	(Soviet Union) Soyuz-U		(Soviet Union) Plesetsk Cosmodrome unknown pad		(Soviet Union)	
15 May; 11:40	(Soviet Union) Kosmos 1098		Low Earth (72.9 degrees inclination)		unknown	Successful
15 May; 11:40	Military payload (6000 kg)					
17 May; 07:10	(Soviet Union) Soyuz-U		(Soviet Union) Plesetsk Cosmodrome LC43/4		(Soviet Union)	
17 May; 07:10	(Soviet Union) Kosmos 1099		Low Earth (81.3 degrees inclination)		unknown	Successful
17 May; 07:10	Military payload (6000 kg)					
22 May; 23:00:00	(Soviet Union) Proton-K		(Soviet Union) Baikonur Cosmodrome, pad LC 81P (pad 24)		(Soviet Union)	
22 May; 23:00:00	(Soviet Union) Kosmos 1100 Kosmos 1101		Low Earth (51.6 degrees inclination)		unknown	Successful
22 May; 23:00:00	Military payload (2x9000 kg)					
25 May; 07:00	(Soviet Union) Soyuz-U		(Soviet Union) Plesetsk Cosmodrome pad LC 41/1		(Soviet Union)	
25 May; 07:00	(Soviet Union) Kosmos 1102		Low Earth (81.3 degrees inclination)		unknown	Successful
25 May; 07:00	Military payload (5500 kg)					
28 May; 18:30	(United States) Titan 3B/Agena		(United States) Vandenberg pad SLC 4W		(United States)	
28 May; 18:30	(United States) unknown		SSO		unknown	Successful
28 May; 18:30	Military payload (4000 kg)					
31 May; 16:30	(Soviet Union) Soyuz-U		(Soviet Union) Plesetsk Cosmodrome LC43/3		(Soviet Union)	
31 May; 16:30	(Soviet Union) Kosmos 1103		Low Earth (62.7 degrees inclination)		unknown	Successful
31 May; 16:30	Military payload (6000 kg)					
31 May; 17:58	(Soviet Union) Kosmos-3M		(Soviet Union) Plesetsk Cosmodrome unknown pad		(Soviet Union)	
31 May; 17:58	(Soviet Union) Kosmos 1104		Low Earth (82.9 degrees inclination)		unknown	Successful
31 May; 17:58	Military payload (810 kg)					
← Jan; Feb; Mar; Apr; May; Jun; Jul; Aug; Sep; Oct; Nov; Dec →; === June ===
2 June; 23:26	(United States) Scout D-1 S198C		(United States) Wallops LA-3A		(United States)	
2 June; 23:26	(United Kingdom) Ariel 6		unknown		unknown	Successful
2 June; 23:26	Civilian payload					
5 June; 23:28	(Soviet Union) Molniya-M		(Soviet Union) Plesetsk Cosmodrome LC43/4		(Soviet Union)	
5 June; 23:28	(Soviet Union) Molniya 3-12		Extremely Elliptical Orbit (72.9 degrees inclination)		unknown	Successful
5 June; 23:28	Civilian payload (1750 kg)					
6 June; 18:12:41	(Soviet Union) Soyuz-U		(Soviet Union) Baikonur Site 31/5		(Soviet Union)	
6 June; 18:12:41	(Soviet Union) Soyuz 34		Low Earth (Salyut 6)	Crew return	19 August; 12:29	Successful
6 June; 18:12:41	Launched uncrewed to replace Soyuz 32 which had passed the end of its design life, landed with two cosmonauts					
6 June; 18:22:12	(United States) Thor DSV-2U		(United States) Vandenberg SLC-10W		(United States)	
6 June; 18:22:12	(United States) DMSP-5D1 F4 (AMS-4)	US Air Force	Low Earth	Weather	In orbit	Successful
7 June; 10:30	(Soviet Union) Kosmos-3M		(Soviet Union) Kapustin Yar pad LC 107		(Soviet Union)	
7 June; 10:30	(India) Bhaskar 1		Low Earth (50.7 degrees inclination)		unknown	Successful
7 June; 10:30	Civilian payload (441 kg)					
8 June; 07:10	(Soviet Union) Soyuz-U		(Soviet Union) Plesetsk Cosmodrome pad LC 41/1		(Soviet Union)	
8 June; 07:10	(Soviet Union) Kosmos 1105		Low Earth (81.3 degrees inclination)		unknown	Successful
8 June; 07:10	Military payload (5500 kg)					
10 June; 13:30:00	(United States) Titan 3C/Transtage		(United States) Cape Canaveral pad LC 40		(United States)	
10 June; 13:30:00	(United States) DSP 11		GEO		unknown	Successful
10 June; 13:30:00	Military payload (1170 kg)					
12 June; 07:00	(Soviet Union) Soyuz-U		(Soviet Union) Plesetsk Cosmodrome LC43/4		(Soviet Union)	
12 June; 07:00	(Soviet Union) Kosmos 1106		Low Earth (81.4 degrees inclination)		unknown	Successful
12 June; 07:00	Military payload (5500 kg)					
15 June; 10:50	(Soviet Union) Soyuz-U		(Soviet Union) Plesetsk Cosmodrome LC43/3		(Soviet Union)	
15 June; 10:50	(Soviet Union) Kosmos 1107		Low Earth (72.9 degrees inclination)		unknown	Successful
15 June; 10:50	Military payload (6000 kg)					
22 June; 07:00	(Soviet Union) Soyuz-U		(Soviet Union) Plesetsk Cosmodrome LC43/4		(Soviet Union)	
22 June; 07:00	(Soviet Union) Kosmos 1108		Low Earth (81.3 degrees inclination)		unknown	Successful
22 June; 07:00	Military payload (5500 kg)					
27 June; 15:51:59	(United States) Atlas F		(United States) Vandenberg pad SLC 3W		(United States)	
27 June; 15:51:59	(United States) NOAA 6(NOAA A)		Low Earth (98.5 degrees inclination)		unknown	Successful
27 June; 15:51:59	Civilian payload (723 kg)					
27 June; 18:11:23	(Soviet Union) Molniya-M		(Soviet Union) Plesetsk Cosmodrome pad LC 41/1		(Soviet Union)	
27 June; 18:11:23	(Soviet Union) Kosmos 1109		Extremely Elliptical Orbit (62.9 degrees inclination)		unknown	Successful
27 June; 18:11:23	Military payload (1250 kg)					
28 June; 09:25:11	(Soviet Union) Soyuz-U		(Soviet Union) Baikonur Cosmodrome pad LC 31		(Soviet Union)	
28 June; 09:25:11	(Soviet Union) Progress 7		Salyut 6 orbit(51.6 degrees inclination)		unknown	Successful
28 June; 09:25:11	Civilian payload (1020 kg)					
28 June; 20:09	(Soviet Union) Kosmos-3M		(Soviet Union) Plesetsk Cosmodrome unknown pad		(Soviet Union)	
28 June; 20:09	(Soviet Union) Kosmos 1110		Low Earth (74.0 degrees inclination)		unknown	Successful
28 June; 20:09	Military payload (875 kg)					
29 June; 16:00	(Soviet Union) Soyuz-U		(Soviet Union) Plesetsk Cosmodrome LC43/3		(Soviet Union)	
29 June; 16:00	(Soviet Union) Kosmos 1111		Low Earth (62.8 degrees inclination)		unknown	Successful
29 June; 16:00	Military payload (6000 kg)					
← Jan; Feb; Mar; Apr; May; Jun; Jul; Aug; Sep; Oct; Nov; Dec →; === July ===
5 July; 23:19:00	(Soviet Union) Proton-K/DM		(Soviet Union) Baikonur Cosmodrome, pad LC 200P (pad 40)		(Soviet Union)	
5 July; 23:19:00	(Soviet Union) Gorizont 2		GEO		unknown	Successful
5 July; 23:19:00	Civilian payload (2120 kg)					
6 July; 08:20	(Soviet Union) Kosmos-3M		(Soviet Union) Kapustin Yar pad LC 107		(Soviet Union)	
6 July; 08:20	(Soviet Union) Kosmos 1112		Low Earth (50.7 degrees inclination)		unknown	Successful
6 July; 08:20	Military payload (1190 kg)					
10 July; 09:00:00	(Soviet Union) Soyuz-U		(Soviet Union) Baikonur Cosmodrome unknown pad		(Soviet Union)	
10 July; 09:00:00	(Soviet Union) Kosmos 1113		Low Earth (65.0 degrees inclination)		unknown	Successful
10 July; 09:00:00	Military payload (6000 kg)					
11 July; 15:41	(Soviet Union) Kosmos-3M		(Soviet Union) Plesetsk Cosmodrome unknown pad		(Soviet Union)	
11 July; 15:41	(Soviet Union) Kosmos 1114		Low Earth (74.0 degrees inclination)		unknown	Successful
11 July; 15:41	Military payload (900 kg)					
13 July; 08:25	(Soviet Union) Soyuz-U		(Soviet Union) Plesetsk Cosmodrome LC43/4		(Soviet Union)	
13 July; 08:25	(Soviet Union) Kosmos 1115		Low Earth (81.3 degrees inclination)		unknown	Successful
13 July; 08:25	Military payload (5500 kg)					
20 July; 11:58	(Soviet Union) Vostok-M		(Soviet Union) Plesetsk Cosmodrome LC43/4		(Soviet Union)	
20 July; 11:58	(Soviet Union) Kosmos 1116		Low Earth (81.2 degrees inclination)		unknown	Successful
20 July; 11:58	Military payload (2500 kg)					
25 July; 15:20	(Soviet Union) Soyuz-U		(Soviet Union) Plesetsk Cosmodrome LC43/3		(Soviet Union)	
25 July; 15:20	(Soviet Union) Kosmos 1117		Low Earth (62.8 degrees inclination)		unknown	Successful
25 July; 15:20	Military payload (6000 kg)					
27 July; 07:30	(Soviet Union) Soyuz-U		(Soviet Union) Plesetsk Cosmodrome LC43/4		(Soviet Union)	
27 July; 07:30	(Soviet Union) Kosmos 1118		Low Earth (81.3 degrees inclination)		unknown	Successful
27 July; 07:30	Military payload (5500 kg)					
27 July; 21:28	(China) Feng Bao 1		(China) Jiquan Satellite Launch Center LA-2B (Site 138)		(China)	
27 July; 21:28	(China) Shi Jian (2)		Intended: Low Earth	Micrometeoroid research, electromagnetic background research	27 July	Failure
27 July; 21:28	(China) Shi Jian (2A)		Intended: Low Earth	Ionosphere research	27 July	Failure
27 July; 21:28	(China) Shi Jian (2B)		Intended: Low Earth	Radar calibration	27 July	Failure
27 July; 21:28	Civilian payload (770 kg). Second stage malfunction					
31 July; 03:56	(Soviet Union) Molniya-M		(Soviet Union) Plesetsk Cosmodrome LC43/3		(Soviet Union)	
31 July; 03:56	(Soviet Union) Molniya 1-44		Extremely Elliptical Orbit (64.2 degrees inclination)		unknown	Successful
31 July; 03:56	Civilian payload (1600 kg)					
← Jan; Feb; Mar; Apr; May; Jun; Jul; Aug; Sep; Oct; Nov; Dec →; === August ===
3 August; 10:45	(Soviet Union) Soyuz-U		(Soviet Union) Plesetsk Cosmodrome LC43/3		(Soviet Union)	
3 August; 10:45	(Soviet Union) Kosmos 1119		Low Earth (81.3 degrees inclination)		unknown	Successful
3 August; 10:45	Military payload (5500 kg)					
10 August; 00:20	(United States) Delta 2914		(United States) Cape Canaveral pad LC 17A		(United States) McDonnell Douglas	
10 August; 00:20	(United States) Westar 3(Westar C)		GTO		unknown	Successful
10 August; 00:20	Commercial payload (574 kg)					
10 August; 02:28	(India) SLV		(India) Satish Dhawan Space Centre pad SLV		(India)	
10 August; 02:28	(India) Rohini RS-1				10 August 1979	Failed to reach orbit due control valve malfunction in 2nd stage
10 August; 02:28	Civilian payload (30 kg)					
11 August; 09:15:00	(Soviet Union) Soyuz-U		(Soviet Union) Baikonur Cosmodrome unknown pad		(Soviet Union)	
11 August; 09:15:00	(Soviet Union) Kosmos 1120		Low Earth (70.4 degrees inclination)		unknown	Successful
11 August; 09:15:00	Military payload (5500 kg)					
14 August; 15:30	(Soviet Union) Soyuz-U		(Soviet Union) Plesetsk Cosmodrome LC43/3		(Soviet Union)	
14 August; 15:30	(Soviet Union) Kosmos 1121		Low Earth (67.2 degrees inclination)		unknown	Successful
14 August; 15:30	Military payload (6700 kg)					
17 August; 07:45	(Soviet Union) Soyuz-U		(Soviet Union) Plesetsk Cosmodrome LC43/4		(Soviet Union)	
17 August; 07:45	(Soviet Union) Kosmos 1122		Low Earth (81.3 degrees inclination)		unknown	Successful
17 August; 07:45	Military payload (5500 kg)					
21 August; 11:10	(Soviet Union) Soyuz-U		(Soviet Union) Plesetsk Cosmodrome pad LC 41/1		(Soviet Union)	
21 August; 11:10	(Soviet Union) Kosmos 1123		Low Earth (81.3 degrees inclination)		unknown	Successful
21 August; 11:10	Military payload (5500 kg)					
28 August; 00:17:04	(Soviet Union) Molniya-M		(Soviet Union) Plesetsk Cosmodrome LC43/4		(Soviet Union)	
28 August; 00:17:04	(Soviet Union) Kosmos 1124		Extremely Elliptical Orbit (68 degrees inclination)		unknown	Launch successful. Satellite exploded 9 September 1979 into 8 pieces.
28 August; 00:17:04	Military payload (1250 kg)					
28 August; 00:55	(Soviet Union) Kosmos-3M		(Soviet Union) Plesetsk Cosmodrome unknown pad		(Soviet Union)	
28 August; 00:55	(Soviet Union) Kosmos 1125		Low Earth (74.0 degrees inclination)		unknown	Successful
28 August; 00:55	Military payload (875 kg)					
31 August; 11:30	(Soviet Union) Soyuz-U		(Soviet Union) Plesetsk Cosmodrome LC43/4		(Soviet Union)	
31 August; 11:30	(Soviet Union) Kosmos 1126		Low Earth (72.8 degrees inclination)		unknown	Successful
31 August; 11:30	Military payload (6000 kg)					
← Jan; Feb; Mar; Apr; May; Jun; Jul; Aug; Sep; Oct; Nov; Dec →; === September ===
5 September; 10:20	(Soviet Union) Soyuz-U		(Soviet Union) Plesetsk Cosmodrome unknown pad		(Soviet Union)	
5 September; 10:20	(Soviet Union) Kosmos 1127		Low Earth (81.3 degrees inclination)		unknown	Successful
5 September; 10:20	Military payload (6000 kg)					
14 September; 15:30	(Soviet Union) Soyuz-U		(Soviet Union) Plesetsk Cosmodrome LC43/4		(Soviet Union)	
14 September; 15:30	(Soviet Union) Kosmos 1128		Low Earth (62.8 degrees inclination)		unknown	Successful
14 September; 15:30	Military payload (6000 kg)					
20 September; 05:28	(United States) Atlas SLV 3D		(United States) Cape Canaveral pad LC 36B		(United States)	
20 September; 05:28	(United States) HEAO 3(HEAO C)		Low Earth (43.6 degrees inclination)		unknown	Successful
20 September; 05:28	Civilian payload (3150 kg)					
25 September; 15:30	(Soviet Union) Soyuz-U		(Soviet Union) Plesetsk Cosmodrome pad LC 41/1		(Soviet Union)	
25 September; 15:30	(Soviet Union) Kosmos 1129		Low Earth (62.8 degrees inclination)		unknown	Successful
25 September; 15:30	Military payload (6000 kg)					
25 September; 21:00	(Soviet Union) Kosmos-3M		(Soviet Union) Plesetsk Cosmodrome unknown pad		(Soviet Union)	
25 September; 21:00	(Soviet Union) Kosmos 1130–1137		Low Earth (74.0 degrees inclination)		unknown	Successful
25 September; 21:00	Military payload (8x61 kg)					
28 September; 12:20	(Soviet Union) Soyuz-U		(Soviet Union) Plesetsk Cosmodrome LC43/3		(Soviet Union)	
28 September; 12:20	(Soviet Union) Kosmos 1138		Low Earth (72.8 degrees inclination)		unknown	Successful
28 September; 12:20	Military payload (6000 kg)					
← Jan; Feb; Mar; Apr; May; Jun; Jul; Aug; Sep; Oct; Nov; Dec →; === October ===
1 October; 11:22:00	(United States) Titan 3C/Transtage		(United States) Cape Canaveral pad LC 40		(United States)	
1 October; 11:22:00	(United States) unknown		unknown		unknown	Successful
1 October; 11:22:00	Military payload (820 kg)					
3 October; 17:12:00	(Soviet Union) Proton-K/DM		(Soviet Union) Baikonur Cosmodrome, pad LC 200P (pad 40)		(Soviet Union)	
3 October; 17:12:00	(Soviet Union) Ekran 4		GEO		unknown	Successful
3 October; 17:12:00	Civilian payload (1970 kg)					
5 October; 11:30	(Soviet Union) Soyuz-U		(Soviet Union) Plesetsk Cosmodrome unknown pad		(Soviet Union)	
5 October; 11:30	(Soviet Union) Kosmos 1139		Low Earth (72.9 degrees inclination)		unknown	Successful
5 October; 11:30	Military payload (5500 kg)					
11 October; 16:36	(Soviet Union) Kosmos-3M		(Soviet Union) Plesetsk Cosmodrome unknown pad		(Soviet Union)	
11 October; 16:36	(Soviet Union) Kosmos 1140		Low Earth (74.1 degrees inclination)		unknown	Successful
11 October; 16:36	Military payload (875 kg)					
12 October; 12:30	(Soviet Union) Soyuz-U		(Soviet Union) Plesetsk Cosmodrome LC43/3		(Soviet Union)	
12 October; 12:30	(Soviet Union) Kosmos, number not assigned				12 October 1979	Failed to reach orbit
16 October; 12:17	(Soviet Union) Kosmos-3M		(Soviet Union) Plesetsk Cosmodrome unknown pad		(Soviet Union)	
16 October; 12:17	(Soviet Union) Kosmos 1141		Low Earth (83.0 degrees inclination)		unknown	Successful
16 October; 12:17	Military payload (810 kg)					
20 October; 07:03	(Soviet Union) Molniya-M		(Soviet Union) Plesetsk Cosmodrome unknown pad		(Soviet Union)	
20 October; 07:03	(Soviet Union) Molniya 1-45		Extremely Elliptical Orbit (64.7 degrees inclination)		unknown	Successful
20 October; 07:03	Civilian payload (1600 kg)					
22 October; 12:30	(Soviet Union) Soyuz-U		(Soviet Union) Plesetsk Cosmodrome LC43/3		(Soviet Union)	
22 October; 12:30	(Soviet Union) Kosmos 1142		Low Earth (72.9 degrees inclination)		unknown	Successful
22 October; 12:30	Military payload (6000 kg)					
26 October; 18:12	(Soviet Union) Vostok-M		(Soviet Union) Plesetsk Cosmodrome LC43/4		(Soviet Union)	
26 October; 18:12	(Soviet Union) Kosmos 1143		Low Earth (81.2 degrees inclination)		unknown	Successful
26 October; 18:12	Military payload (2500 kg)					
30 October; 14:16	(United States) Scout G-1 S203C		(United States) Vandenberg SLC-5			
30 October; 14:16	(United States) Magsat		Low Earth (96.8 degrees inclination)		11 June 1980	Successful
30 October; 14:16	Civilian payload (181 kg)					
31 October; 09:25:00	(Soviet Union) Vostok-M		(Soviet Union) Plesetsk Cosmodrome LC43/4		(Soviet Union)	
31 October; 09:25:00	(Soviet Union) Meteor 2-5		Low Earth (81.2 degrees inclination)		unknown	Successful
31 October; 09:25:00	Civilian payload (1300 kg)					
← Jan; Feb; Mar; Apr; May; Jun; Jul; Aug; Sep; Oct; Nov; Dec →; === November ===
1 November; 08:05	(Soviet Union) Kosmos-3M		(Soviet Union) Plesetsk Cosmodrome pad LC 132/2		(Soviet Union)	
1 November; 08:05	(Soviet Union) Interkosmos 20		Low Earth (74.0 degrees inclination)		unknown	Successful
1 November; 08:05	Civilian payload (1100 kg)					
2 November; 16:00	(Soviet Union) Soyuz-U		(Soviet Union) Plesetsk Cosmodrome LC43/3		(Soviet Union)	
2 November; 16:00	(Soviet Union) Kosmos 1144		Low Earth (67.1 degrees inclination)		unknown	Successful
2 November; 16:00	Military payload (6700 kg)					
21 November; 02:09:36	(United States) Titan 3C/Transtage		(United States) Cape Canaveral pad LC 40		(United States)	
21 November; 02:09:36	(United States) DSCS 2 13, DSCS 2 14		GEO		unknown	Successful
21 November; 02:09:36	Military payload (2x612 kg)					
27 November; 09:55	(Soviet Union) Vostok-M		(Soviet Union) Plesetsk Cosmodrome LC43/4		(Soviet Union)	
27 November; 09:55	(Soviet Union) Kosmos 1145		Low Earth (81.2 degrees inclination)		unknown	Successful
27 November; 09:55	Military payload (2500 kg)					
← Jan; Feb; Mar; Apr; May; Jun; Jul; Aug; Sep; Oct; Nov; Dec →; === December ===
5 December; 09:00	(Soviet Union) Kosmos-3M		(Soviet Union) Plesetsk Cosmodrome unknown pad		(Soviet Union)	
5 December; 09:00	(Soviet Union) Kosmos 1146		Low Earth (65.9 degrees inclination)		unknown	Successful
5 December; 09:00	Military payload (1000 kg)					
7 December; 01:35	(United States) Delta 3914		(United States) Cape Canaveral pad LC 17A		(United States) McDonnell Douglas	
7 December; 01:35	(United States) Satcom 3(Satcom C)		GTO		unknown	Satellite failed while being on the GTO, has been destroyed
7 December; 01:35	Commercial payload (895 kg)					
12 December; 12:30	(Soviet Union) Soyuz-U		(Soviet Union) Plesetsk Cosmodrome LC43/3		(Soviet Union)	
12 December; 12:30	(Soviet Union) Kosmos 1147		Low Earth (72.9 degrees inclination)		unknown	Successful
12 December; 12:30	Military payload (6000 kg)					
16 December; 12:29:50	(Soviet Union) Soyuz-U		(Soviet Union) Baikonur Cosmodrome unknown pad		(Soviet Union)	
16 December; 12:29:50	(Soviet Union) Soyuz T-1		Salyut 6 orbit (51.6 degrees inclination)		21:47, 25 March 1980	Successful
16 December; 12:29:50	Salyut 6 orbit boost mission completed					
24 December; 17:14:38	(France) Ariane 1		(France) Kourou ELA-1		ESA	
24 December; 17:14:38	CAT-1	ESA	Low Earth	Technology	27 November 1989	Successful
24 December; 17:14:38	Maiden flight of the Ariane 1, and the Ariane family					
28 December; 11:51:00	(Soviet Union) Proton-K/DM		(Soviet Union) Baikonur Cosmodrome, pad LC 200P (pad 40)		(Soviet Union)	
28 December; 11:51:00	(Soviet Union) Gorizont 3		GEO		unknown	Successful
28 December; 11:51:00	Civilian payload (2120 kg)					
28 December; 13:00	(Soviet Union) Soyuz-U		(Soviet Union) Plesetsk Cosmodrome LC43/3		(Soviet Union)	
28 December; 13:00	(Soviet Union) Kosmos 1148		Low Earth (67.1 degrees inclination)		unknown	Successful
28 December; 13:00	Military payload (6000 kg)					

- ← Jan
- Feb
- Mar
- Apr
- May
- Jun
- Jul
- Aug
- Sep
- Oct
- Nov
- Dec →

== Deep Space Rendezvous ==
Date (GMT)	Spacecraft	Event	Remarks
5 March	Voyager 1	Flyby of Jupiter	Closest approach: 280,000 kilometres (170,000 mi)
9 July	Voyager 2	Flyby of Jupiter	Closest approach: 645,000 kilometres (401,000 mi)
1 September	Pioneer 11	Flyby of Saturn	Closest approach: 20,900 kilometres (13,000 mi)

== EVAs ==
Start date/time	Duration	End time	Spacecraft	Crew	Remarks
15 August; 14:16	1 hour 23 minutes	15:39	Salyut 6 PE-3	(Soviet Union) Valery Ryumin (Soviet Union) Vladimir Lyakhov	Removed the KRT-10 antenna that had failed to separate from Salyut and had fouled the aft docking port target. After disposing of the antenna, Ryumin collected samples of damaged insulation and a retrieved a micrometeoroid detector.
