= GOES 4 =

NOAA weather satellite

GOES-4
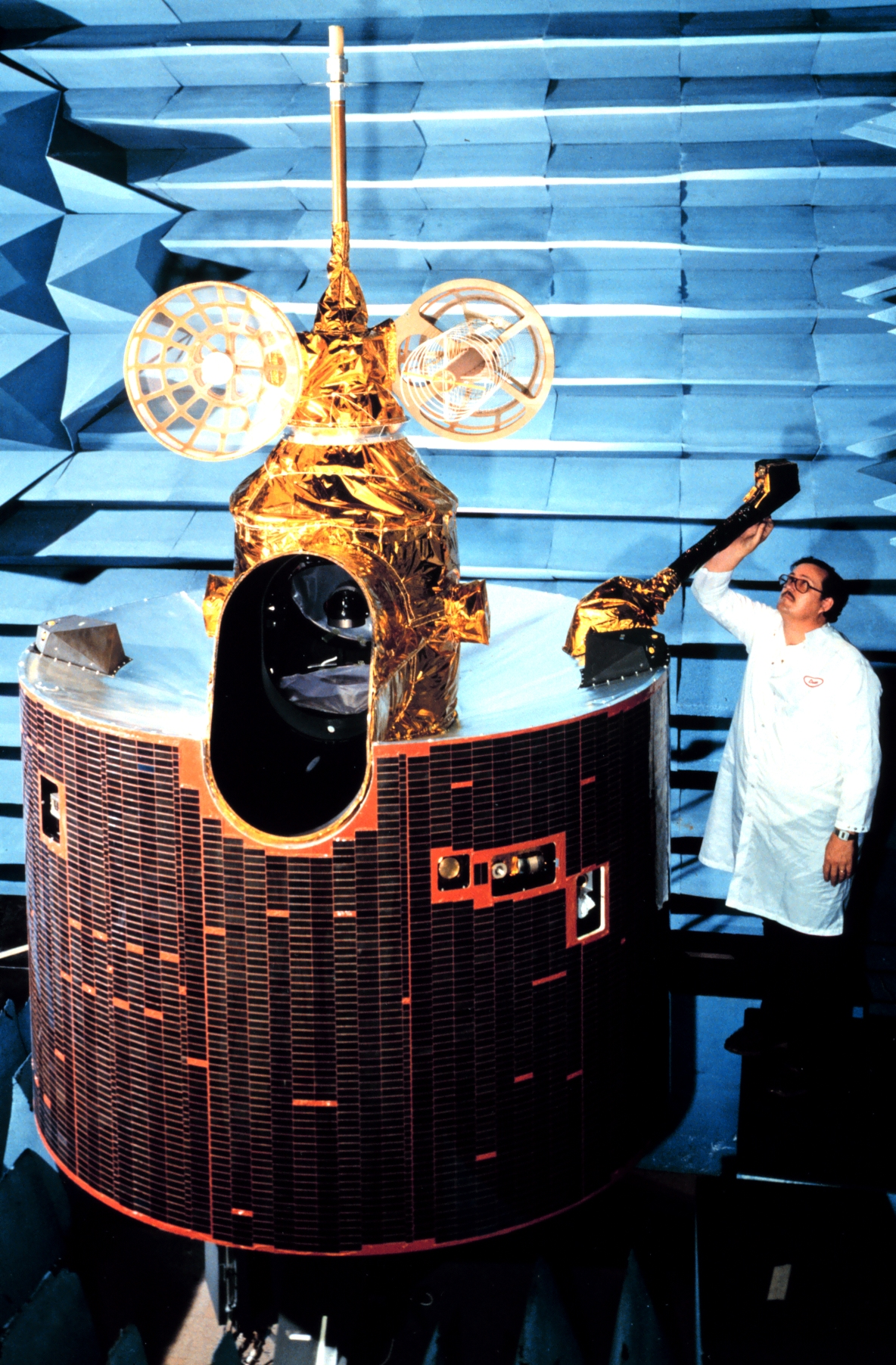
- GOES-D before launch
- Mission type: Weather satellite
- Operator: NOAA/NASA
- COSPAR ID: 1980-074A
- SATCAT no.: 11964
- Mission duration: 7 years (planned); 8.2 years (achieved)

Spacecraft properties
- Bus: HS-371
- Manufacturer: Hughes
- Launch mass: 660 kilograms (1,460 lb)

Start of mission
- Launch date: 9 September 1980, 22:27 UTC
- Rocket: Delta 3914
- Launch site: Cape Canaveral LC-17A
- Contractor: McDonnell Douglas

End of mission
- Disposal: Decommissioned
- Deactivated: 9 October 1988

Orbital parameters
- Reference system: Geocentric
- Regime: Geostationary
- Longitude: 98° West (1980-1981); 135° West (1981-1983); 139° West (1983-1984); 10° West (1985); 44° West (1985-1988)
- Slot: GOES-WEST (1981-1983)
- Period: 24 hours
- Geostationary Operational Environmental Satellite; First Generation

GOES-4, known as GOES-D before becoming operational, was a geostationary weather satellite which was operated by the United States National Oceanic and Atmospheric Administration as part of the Geostationary Operational Environmental Satellite system. Launched in 1980, it was used for weather forecasting in the United States, and later in Europe. Following its retirement it became the first satellite to be sent into a graveyard orbit.

== Limited lifespan ==
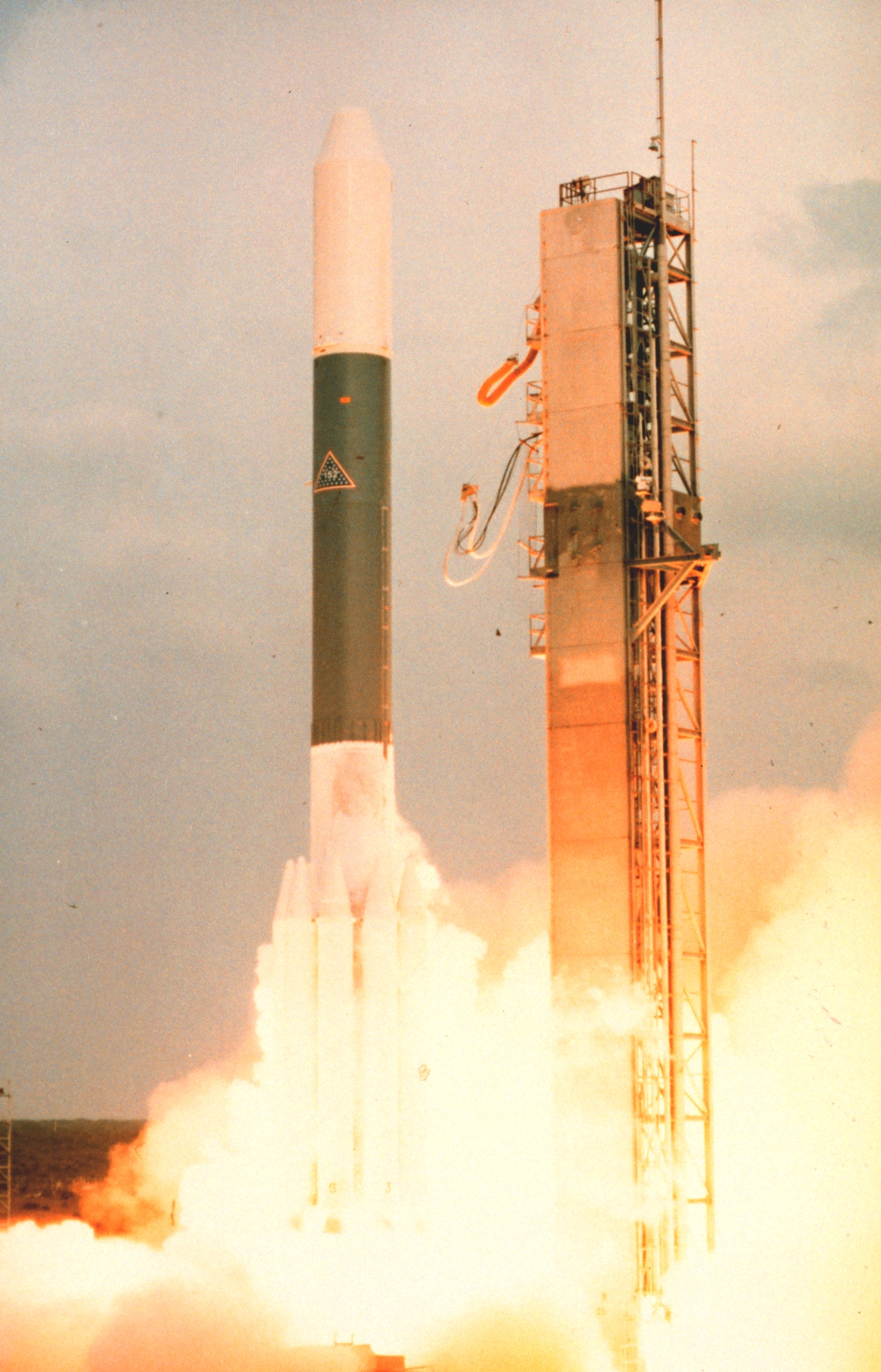
Launch of GOES-D on a Delta 3914

GOES-4 was built by Hughes Space and Communications, and was based around the HS-371 satellite bus. At launch it had a mass of 660 kilograms (1,460 lb), with an expected operational lifespan of around seven years. It was the first HS-371 based GOES satellite.

== Launch and orbit ==
GOES-D was launched using a Delta 3914 carrier rocket flying from Launch Complex 17A at the Cape Canaveral Air Force Station. The launch occurred at 22:27 GMT on 9 September 1980. The launch successfully placed GOES-D into a geosynchronous transfer orbit, from which it raised itself to geostationary orbit by means of an onboard Star-27 apogee motor. Its insertion into geostationary orbit occurred at 12:00 on 11 September.

Following its insertion into geostationary orbit, GOES-4 was positioned at 98° West. In 1981, it was moved to 135° West, where it remained until 1983 when it was moved to 139° West (1983–1984). In 1985 it was repositioned at 10° West, and later 44° West, where it provided coverage of Europe for EUMETSAT following the failure of the Meteosat-2 spacecraft.

== Graveyard orbit ==
Following the end of its operations over Europe, GOES-4 was retired from service. It became the first spacecraft to be raised out of geosynchronous orbit, into a graveyard orbit for disposal. This was accomplished on 9 November 1988, using remaining propellent in the satellite's station-keeping thrusters.

== See also ==
- 1980 in spaceflight
