= Progress 11 =

Soviet unmanned Progress cargo spacecraft

- A Progress 7K-TG spacecraft
- Mission type: Salyut 6 resupply
- COSPAR ID: 1980-079A
- SATCAT no.: 11993

Spacecraft properties
- Spacecraft: Progress (No.111)
- Spacecraft type: Progress 7K-TG
- Manufacturer: NPO Energia

Start of mission
- Launch date: 28 September 1980, 15:09:55 UTC
- Rocket: Soyuz-U
- Launch site: Baikonur, Site 1/5

End of mission
- Disposal: Deorbited
- Decay date: 11 December 1980, 14:00 UTC

Orbital parameters
- Reference system: Geocentric
- Regime: Low Earth
- Perigee altitude: 188 km
- Apogee altitude: 241 km
- Inclination: 51.6°
- Period: 88.7 minutes
- Epoch: 28 September 1980

Docking with Salyut 6
- Docking port: Aft
- Docking date: 30 September 1980, 17:03 UTC
- Undocking date: 9 December 1980, 10:23 UTC

Progress 11 (Russian: Прогресс 11) was a Soviet unmanned Progress cargo spacecraft, which was launched in September 1980 to resupply the Salyut 6 space station.

== Spacecraft ==
Progress 11 was a Progress 7K-TG spacecraft. The eleventh of forty three to be launched, it had the serial number 111. The Progress 7K-TG spacecraft was the first generation Progress, derived from the Soyuz 7K-T and intended for uncrewed logistics missions to space stations in support of the Salyut programme. On some missions the spacecraft were also used to adjust the orbit of the space station.

The Progress spacecraft had a dry mass of 6,520 kilograms (14,370 lb), which increased to around 7,020 kilograms (15,480 lb) when fully fuelled. It measured 7.48 metres (24.5 ft) in length, and 2.72 metres (8 ft 11 in) in diameter. Each spacecraft could accommodate up to 2,500 kilograms (5,500 lb) of payload, consisting of dry cargo and propellant. The spacecraft were powered by chemical batteries, and could operate in free flight for up to three days, remaining docked to the station for up to thirty.

== Launch ==
Progress 11 launched on 28 September 1980 from the Baikonur Cosmodrome in the Kazakh SSR. It used a Soyuz-U rocket.

== Docking ==
Progress 11 docked with the aft port of Salyut 6 on 30 September 1980 at 17:03 UTC, and was undocked on 9 December 1980 at 10:23 UTC.

== Decay ==
It remained in orbit until 11 December 1980, when it was deorbited. The deorbit burn occurred at 14:00 UTC.

== See also ==
- 1980 in spaceflight
- List of Progress missions
- List of uncrewed spaceflights to Salyut space stations
