= Kosmos 1171 =

Soviet anti-satellite test target satellite

- Mission type: ASAT target
- COSPAR ID: 1980-026A
- SATCAT no.: 11750

Spacecraft properties
- Spacecraft type: Lira
- Manufacturer: Yuzhnoye
- Launch mass: 650 kilograms (1,430 lb)

Start of mission
- Launch date: 3 April 1980, 07:40 UTC
- Rocket: Kosmos-3M
- Launch site: Plesetsk 132/2

Orbital parameters
- Reference system: Geocentric
- Regime: Low Earth
- Perigee altitude: 969 kilometres (602 mi)
- Apogee altitude: 1,001 kilometres (622 mi)
- Inclination: 65.8 degrees
- Period: 104.8 minutes

Kosmos 1171 (Russian: Космос 1171 meaning Cosmos 1171) was a satellite which was used as a target for tests of anti-satellite weapons. It was launched by the Soviet Union in 1980 as part of the Dnepropetrovsk Sputnik programme, and used as a target for Kosmos 1174, as part of the Istrebitel Sputnikov programme.

It was launched aboard a Kosmos-3M carrier rocket, from Site 132/2 at the Plesetsk Cosmodrome. The launch occurred at 07:40 UTC on 3 April 1980.

Kosmos 1171 was placed into a low Earth orbit with a perigee of 969 kilometres (602 mi), an apogee of 1,001 kilometres (622 mi), 65.8 degrees of inclination, and an orbital period of 104.8 minutes. It was to have been intercepted by Kosmos 1174 on 18 April, however the interceptor malfunctioned and missed the target. Two further attempts over the next two days also failed, before the interceptor was commanded to self-destruct. As of 2009, Kosmos 1171 is still in orbit.

Kosmos 1171 was the eighth of ten Lira satellites to be launched, of which all but the first were successful. Lira was derived from the earlier DS-P1-M satellite, which it replaced.

== See also ==
- 1980 in spaceflight
