= Kosmos 1109 =

Soviet military early warning satellite

- Mission type: Early warning
- COSPAR ID: 1979-058A
- SATCAT no.: 11417
- Mission duration: 4 years

Spacecraft properties
- Spacecraft type: US-K
- Launch mass: 1,900 kilograms (4,200 lb)

Start of mission
- Launch date: 27 June 1979, 18:11 UTC
- Rocket: Molniya-M/2BL
- Launch site: Plesetsk Cosmodrome

End of mission
- Deactivated: 15 February 1980

Orbital parameters
- Reference system: Geocentric
- Regime: Molniya
- Perigee altitude: 665 kilometres (413 mi)
- Apogee altitude: 39,675 kilometres (24,653 mi)
- Inclination: 62.9 degrees
- Period: 717.48 minutes

Kosmos 1109 (Russian: Космос 1109 meaning Cosmos 1109) was a Soviet US-K missile early warning satellite which was launched in 1979 as part of the Soviet military's Oko programme. The satellite was designed to identify missile launches using optical telescopes and infrared sensors.

Kosmos 1109 was launched from Site 41/1 at Plesetsk Cosmodrome in the Russian SSR. A Molniya-M carrier rocket with a 2BL upper stage was used to perform the launch, which took place at 18:11 UTC on 27 June 1979. The launch successfully placed the satellite into a molniya orbit. It subsequently received its Kosmos designation, and the international designator 1979-058A. The United States Space Command assigned it the Satellite Catalog Number 11417.

Kosmos 1109 maneuvered into an operational orbit about 19 July, 1979. The payload was "lost" after 17 February 1980 and three pieces of debris were soon found that could be traced back to that period. It self-destructed. Other pieces of debris have been found since then. The primary piece remains in orbit but several pieces of debris have since decayed.

== See also ==
- 1979 in spaceflight
- List of Kosmos satellites (1001–1250)
- List of Oko satellites
- List of R-7 launches (1975-1979)
