= Kosmos 1124 =

Russian military early warning satellite

- Mission type: Early warning
- COSPAR ID: 1979-077A
- SATCAT no.: 11509
- Mission duration: 4 years

Spacecraft properties
- Spacecraft type: US-K
- Launch mass: 1,900 kilograms (4,200 lb)

Start of mission
- Launch date: 28 August 1979, 00:17 UTC
- Rocket: Molniya-M/2BL
- Launch site: Plesetsk Cosmodrome

End of mission
- Deactivated: 09 September 1979

Orbital parameters
- Reference system: Geocentric
- Regime: Molniya
- Perigee altitude: 598 kilometres (372 mi)
- Apogee altitude: 39,700 kilometres (24,700 mi)
- Inclination: 63.0 degrees
- Period: 716.65 minutes

Kosmos 1124 (Russian: Космос 1124) was a Soviet US-K missile early warning satellite which was launched in 1979 as part of the Soviet military's Oko programme. The satellite was designed to identify missile launches using optical telescopes and infrared sensors.

Kosmos 1124 was launched from Site 43/4 at Plesetsk Cosmodrome in the Russian SSR. A Molniya-M carrier rocket with a 2BL upper stage was used to perform the launch, which took place at 00:17 UTC on 28 August 1979. The launch successfully placed the satellite into a molniya orbit. It subsequently received its Kosmos designation, and the international designator 1979-077A. The United States Space Command assigned it the Satellite Catalog Number 11509.

It self-destructed on 9 September 1979.

The primary portion of it and several pieces of its debris still remain in orbit.

== See also ==
- 1979 in spaceflight
- List of Kosmos satellites (1001–1250)
- List of Oko satellites
- List of R-7 launches (1975-1979)
