= 1969 in spaceflight =

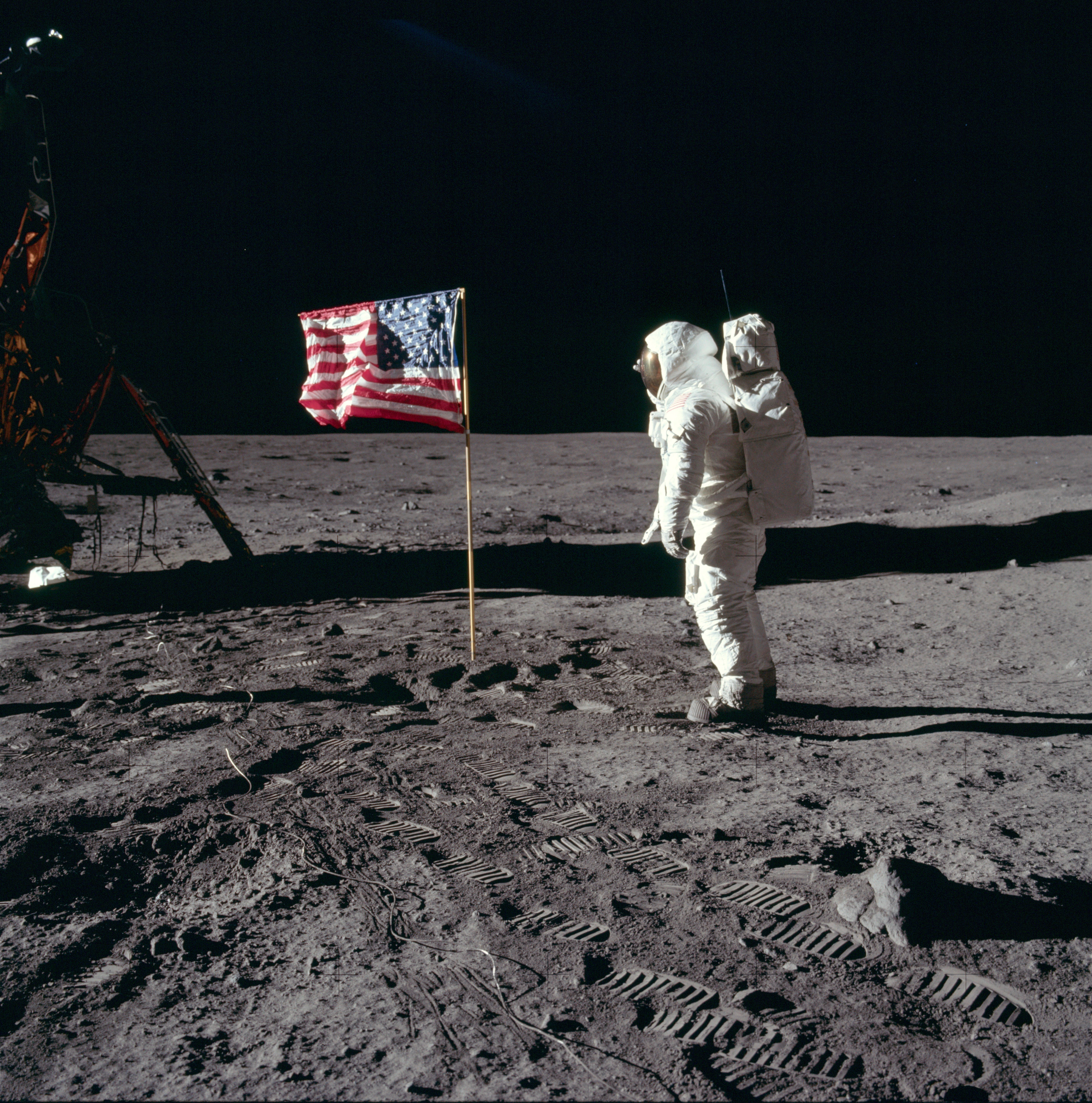
- Humanity's first crewed lunar landing (Apollo 11)

National firsts
- Satellite: West Germany

Rockets
- Maiden flights: Delta L; N-1; Thorad-SLV2H Agena-D; Tsyklon-2; Apollo LM ascent stage
- Retirements: Delta C1; Molniya M/Blok VL; Tsyklon-2A

Crewed flights
- Orbital: 9
- Total travellers: 22

1969 in spaceflight

1969 saw humanity step onto another world for the first time. On 20 July 1969, the Apollo 11 Lunar Module, Eagle, landed on the Moon's surface with two astronauts aboard. Days later the crew of three returned safely to Earth, satisfying U.S. President John F. Kennedy's challenge of 25 May 1961, that "this nation should commit itself to achieving the goal, before this decade is out, of landing a man on the Moon and returning him safely to the Earth."

There were four Apollo missions in total in 1969, three of which traveled to the Moon, with Apollo 12 also landing on the surface. The success of the Apollo program was a testament to the efforts of over 500,000 American engineers, scientists and technicians.

In 1969, the Soviet Union's space program had success with the docking of two crewed spacecraft as well as the success of their Venus and Lunar probes. The Soviets, however, suffered severe blows to their crewed Lunar aspirations when their N1 rocket failed twice during two 1969 launches.

== Orbital launches ==
- ← Jan
- Feb
- Mar
- Apr
- May
- Jun
- Jul
- Aug
- Sep
- Oct
- Nov
- Dec →

Date and time (UTC)	Rocket	Flight number	Launch site		LSP	
Date and time (UTC)	Payload	Operator	Orbit	Function	Decay (UTC)	Outcome
Date and time (UTC)	Remarks					
=== January ===
5 January; 06:28	(Soviet Union) Molniya-M / Blok VL		(Soviet Union) Baikonur Site 1/5		(Soviet Union)	
5 January; 06:28	(Soviet Union) Venera 5		Heliocentric	Venus lander	16 May 1969	Successful
5 January; 06:28	Lander operated for 53 minutes in the atmosphere of Venus.					
10 January; 05:51	(Soviet Union) Molniya-M / Blok-VL		(Soviet Union) Baikonur Site 1/5		(Soviet Union)	
10 January; 05:51	(Soviet Union) Venera 6		Heliocentric	Venus lander	17 May 1969	Successful
10 January; 05:51	Lander operated for 51 minutes in the atmosphere of Venus.					
12 January; 12:10	(Soviet Union) Voskhod		(Soviet Union) Plesetsk Site 41/1		(Soviet Union)	
12 January; 12:10	(Soviet Union) Kosmos 263 (Zenit-2)		Low Earth	Optical imaging	20 January 1969	Successful
14 January; 07:30	(Soviet Union) Soyuz		(Soviet Union) Baikonur LC-31		(Soviet Union) RVSN	
14 January; 07:30	(Soviet Union) Soyuz 4	RVSN	Low Earth	Crewed orbital flight	17 January 1969	Successful
14 January; 07:30	First docking between two crewed spacecraft (with Soyuz 5)					
15 January; 07:04	(Soviet Union) Soyuz		(Soviet Union) Baikonur LC-1/5		(Soviet Union) RVSN	
15 January; 07:04	(Soviet Union) Soyuz 5	RVSN	Low Earth	Crewed orbital flight	18 January 1969	Successful
15 January; 07:04	First docking between two crewed spacecraft (with Soyuz 4)					
20 January; 04:14	(Soviet Union) Proton-K/D		(Soviet Union) Baikonur Site 81/23		(Soviet Union)	
20 January; 04:14	(Soviet Union) Soyuz 7K-L1 (Zond-1969A)		Selenocentric	Test flight	20 January 1969	Failure
20 January; 04:14	One of the RD-0210 engines in the second stage failed, resulting in automatic shutdown of the vehicle. Capsule was successfully recovered after successful launch abort.					
22 January; 16:48	(United States) Delta C1		(United States) Cape Canaveral SLC-17		(United States)	
22 January; 16:48	(United States) OSO 5	NASA	Low Earth	Astronomy	2 April 1984	Successful
22 January; 19:10	(United States) Titan IIIB		(United States) Vandenberg SLC-4W		(United States)	
22 January; 19:10	(United States) OPS 7585 (GAMBIT-3 4319)	NRO	Low Earth	Optical imaging	3 February 1969	Partial failure
22 January; 19:10	Apogee was too high as the Agena rocket stage failed to switch off at a correct time.					
23 January; 09:15	(Soviet Union) Voskhod		(Soviet Union) Baikonur Site 1/5		(Soviet Union)	
23 January; 09:15	(Soviet Union) Kosmos 264 (Zenit-4M)		Low Earth	Optical imaging	5 February 1969	Successful
25 January; 11:10	(Soviet Union) Tsyklon-2A		(Soviet Union) Baikonur Site 90/19		(Soviet Union)	
25 January; 11:10	(Soviet Union) Kosmos 265 (US-AO No.5)		Low Earth	Naval surveillance	23 January 1969	Failure
30 January; 06:46	(United States) Delta E1		(United States) Vandenberg SLC-2E		(United States)	
30 January; 06:46	(Canada) ISIS 1	CSA	Medium Earth	Science	In orbit	Successful
=== February ===
1 February; 12:11	(Soviet Union) Vostok-2M		(Soviet Union) Plesetsk Site 41/1		(Soviet Union)	
1 February; 12:11	(Soviet Union) Kosmos 265 (Meteor-1)	RVSN	Low Earth	Meteorology	1 February 1969	Failure
5 February; 06:46	(United States) Thorad-SLV2G-Agena-D		(United States) Vandenberg SLC-3W		(United States)	
5 February; 06:46	(United States) KH-4B 6 (OPS 3890)	CIA	Low Earth	Optical imaging	24 February 1969	Successful
5 February; 06:46	(United States) P-801 2 (OPS 2644)	USAF	Low Earth	Reconnaissance	In orbit	Successful
6 February; 00:39	(United States) Delta M		(United States) Cape Canaveral SLC-17A		(United States) NASA	
6 February; 00:39	(United States) Intelsat III F-3	Intelsat	Geostationary	Communications	In orbit	Successful
7 February; 13:59	(Soviet Union) Kosmos-2I		(Soviet Union) Plesetsk Site 133/1		(Soviet Union)	
7 February; 13:59	(Soviet Union) Kosmos 265 (DS-P1-Yu No.21)	RVSN	Low Earth	Radar calibration	1 May 1969	Successful
9 February; 21:09	(United States) Titan IIIC		(United States) Cape Canaveral SLC-41		(United States)	
9 February; 21:09	(United States) TACSAT-1 (OPS 0757)	USAF	Geostationary	Communications	In orbit	Successful
19 February; 06:48	(Soviet Union) Proton-K / Blok D		(Soviet Union) Baikonur Site 81/24		(Soviet Union)	
19 February; 06:48	(Soviet Union) Luna 15a + Lunokhod 1A (Ye-8 №201)		Selenocentric	Lunar lander and rover	19 February 1969	Failure
19 February; 06:48	Engine failure in the first stage, rocket crashed 15 km from the pad.					
21 February; 09:18	(Soviet Union) N1/L3		(Soviet Union) Baikonur LC-110/38		(Soviet Union) RVSN	
21 February; 09:18	(Soviet Union) Zond L1S-1	RVSN	Selenocentric	Test flight	21 February	Failure
21 February; 09:18	(Soviet Union) Dummy LK	RVSN	Selenocentric	Mass simulator	21 February	Failure
25 February; 01:29	(United States) Atlas SLV-3C Centaur-D		(United States) Cape Canaveral LC-36		(United States)	
25 February; 01:29	(United States) Mariner 6	NASA	Heliocentric	Mars flyby	In orbit	Successful
25 February; 10:20	(Soviet Union) Voskhod		(Soviet Union) Plesetsk Site 41/1		(Soviet Union)	
25 February; 10:20	(Soviet Union) Kosmos 266 (Zenit-2)		Low Earth	Optical imaging	5 March 1969	Successful
26 February; 07:47	(United States) Delta E1		(United States) Cape Canaveral LC-17B		(United States)	
26 February; 07:47	(United States) ESSA-9	ESSA	Low Earth (SSO)	Meteorology	In orbit	Successful
26 February; 08:30	(Soviet Union) Voskhod		(Soviet Union) Baikonur Site 31/6		(Soviet Union)	
26 February; 08:30	(Soviet Union) Kosmos 267 (Zenit-4)		Low Earth	Optical imaging	6 March 1969	Successful
=== March ===
3 March; 16:00	(United States) Saturn V		(United States) KSC LC-39A		(United States) NASA	
3 March; 16:00	(United States) Apollo 9 CSM Gumdrop	NASA	Low Earth	Crewed orbital flight	13 March 1969	Successful
3 March; 16:00	(United States) Apollo 9 LM Spider	NASA	Low Earth	Test flight	13 March 1969	Successful
3 March; 16:00	First crewed orbital test of lunar module					
4 March; 16:48	(United States) Titan IIIB		(United States) Vandenberg SLC-4W		(United States)	
4 March; 16:48	(United States) KH-8 Gambit 3 (OPS 4248)	USAF	Low Earth	Optical imaging	18 March 1969	Successful
4 March; 16:48	Apogee was too high as the Agena rocket stage failed to switch off at a correct time.					
5 March; 13:04	(Soviet Union) Kosmos-2I		(Soviet Union) Kapustin Yar Site 86/4		(Soviet Union)	
5 March; 13:04	(Soviet Union) Kosmos 268 (DS-P1-Yu No.18)		Low Earth	Radar calibration	9 May 1970	Successful
5 March; 17:25	(Soviet Union) Kosmos-3M		(Soviet Union) Plesetsk Site 132/2		(Soviet Union)	
5 March; 17:25	(Soviet Union) Kosmos 269 (Tselina-O-4)		Low Earth	ELINT	21 October 1978	Successful
6 March; 12:15	(Soviet Union) Voskhod		(Soviet Union) Plesetsk Site 41/1		(Soviet Union)	
6 March; 12:15	(Soviet Union) Kosmos 270 (Zenit-4 No.52)		Low Earth	Optical imaging	14 March 1969	Successful
15 March; 12:15	(Soviet Union) Voskhod		(Soviet Union) Plesetsk Site 41/1		(Soviet Union)	
15 March; 12:15	(Soviet Union) Kosmos 271 (Zenit-4 No.53)		Low Earth	Optical imaging	23 March 1969	Successful
17 March; 17:25	(Soviet Union) Kosmos-3M		(Soviet Union) Plesetsk Site 132/2		(Soviet Union)	
17 March; 17:25	(Soviet Union) Kosmos 272 (Sfera No.4)		Low Earth	Geodesy	In orbit	Successful
18 March; 07:40	(United States) Atlas F-OV1		(United States) Vandenberg ABRES-A2		(United States)	
18 March; 07:40	(United States) OV1-17	USAF	Low Earth	Technology demonstration	5 March 1970	Successful
18 March; 07:40	(United States) OV1-17A ORBISCAL	USAF	Low Earth	Technology demonstration	24 March 1969	Successful
18 March; 07:40	(United States) OV1-18	USAF	Low Earth	Technology demonstration	28 August 1972	Successful
18 March; 07:40	(United States) OV1-19	USAF	Low Earth	Technology demonstration	In orbit	Successful
19 March; 21:38	(United States) Thorad-SLV2G-Agena-D		(United States) Vandenberg SLC-3W		(United States)	
19 March; 21:38	(United States) KH-4A 50 (OPS 3722)	CIA	Low Earth	Optical imaging	24 March 1969	Successful
19 March; 21:38	(United States) P-11 (OPS 2285)	USAF	Low Earth	Reconnaissance	6 December 1971	Successful
22 March; 12:15	(Soviet Union) Voskhod		(Soviet Union) Plesetsk Site 41/1		(Soviet Union)	
22 March; 12:15	(Soviet Union) Kosmos 273 (Zenit-2 No.72)		Low Earth	Optical imaging	30 March 1969	Successful
24 March; 10:10	(Soviet Union) Voskhod		(Soviet Union) Baikonur Site 31/6		(Soviet Union)	
24 March; 10:10	(Soviet Union) Kosmos 274 (Zenit-4 No.54)		Low Earth	Optical imaging	1 April 1969	Successful
26 March; 12:30	(Soviet Union) Vostok-2M		(Soviet Union) Plesetsk Site 41/1		(Soviet Union)	
26 March; 12:30	(Soviet Union) Meteor-1 1		Low Earth	Meteorology	26 March 2012	Successful
27 March; 10:40	(Soviet Union) Proton-K/D		(Soviet Union) Baikonur Site 81/23		(Soviet Union)	
27 March; 10:40	(Soviet Union) Mars 2M No.521		Areocentric	Mars orbiter	27 March 1969	Failure
27 March; 10:40	Payload fairing failed at T+51. Third stage failed to ignite.					
27 March; 22:22	(United States) Atlas SLV-3C Centaur-D		(United States) Cape Canaveral LC-36A		(United States)	
27 March; 22:22	(United States) Mariner 7	NASA	Heliocentric	Mars flyby	In orbit	Successful
28 March; 16:00	(Soviet Union) Kosmos-2I		(Soviet Union) Plesetsk Site 133/1		(Soviet Union)	
28 March; 16:00	(Soviet Union) Kosmos 275 (DS-P1-I No.5)	RVSN	Low Earth	Radar calibration	7 February 1970	Successful
=== April ===
2 April; 10:33	(Soviet Union) Proton-K/D		(Soviet Union) Baikonur Site 81/24		(Soviet Union)	
2 April; 10:33	(Soviet Union) Mars 2M No.522		Areocentric	Mars orbiter and lander	2 April 1969	Failure
2 April; 10:33	Rocket crashed near pad after 1st stage engine failure.					
4 April; 10:20	(Soviet Union) Voskhod		(Soviet Union) Plesetsk Site 41/1		(Soviet Union)	
4 April; 10:20	(Soviet Union) Kosmos 276 (Zenit-4 No.55)		Low Earth	Optical imaging	11 April 1969	Successful
4 April; 13:00	(Soviet Union) Kosmos-2I		(Soviet Union) Plesetsk Site 133/1		(Soviet Union)	
4 April; 13:00	(Soviet Union) Kosmos 277 (DS-P1-Yu No.20)		Low Earth	Radar calibration	6 July 1969	Successful
9 April; 13:00	(Soviet Union) Voskhod		(Soviet Union) Plesetsk Site 41/1		(Soviet Union)	
9 April; 13:00	(Soviet Union) Kosmos 278 (Zenit-2 No.73)		Low Earth	Optical imaging	17 April 1969	Successful
11 April; 02:30	(Soviet Union) Molniya-M/Blok ML		(Soviet Union) Baikonur Site 1/5		(Soviet Union)	
11 April; 02:30	(Soviet Union) Molniya-1 No.11		Molniya	Communications	17 April 1974	Successful
13 April; 02:24	(United States) Atlas-SLV3A Agena-D		(United States) Cape Canaveral LC-13		(United States)	
13 April; 02:24	(United States) Canyon 2 (OPS 3148)	NRO	Geostationary	Reconnaissance	In orbit	Successful
14 April; 07:54	(United States) Thorad-SLV2G-Agena-D		(United States) Vandenberg SLC-2E		(United States)	
14 April; 07:54	(United States) Nimbus 3	NASA, NOAA	Low Earth	Meteorology	In orbit	Successful
14 April; 07:54	(United States) SECOR-13	US Army	Low Earth	Geodesy	In orbit	Successful
15 April; 08:14	(Soviet Union) Voskhod		(Soviet Union) Baikonur Site 31/6		(Soviet Union)	
15 April; 08:14	(Soviet Union) Kosmos 279 (Zenit-4 No.56)		Low Earth	Optical imaging	23 April 1969	Successful
15 April; 17:30	(United States) Titan IIIB		(United States) Vandenberg SLC-4W		(United States)	
15 April; 17:30	(United States) KH-8 Gambit 3 (OPS 5310)	USAF	Low Earth	Optical imaging	30 April 1969	Successful
23 April; 09:55	(Soviet Union) Voskhod		(Soviet Union) Baikonur Site 1/5		(Soviet Union)	
23 April; 09:55	(Soviet Union) Kosmos 280 (Zenit-4M No.3)		Low Earth	Optical imaging	6 May 1969	Successful
=== May ===
2 May; 01:46	(United States) Thorad-SLV2G-Agena-D		(United States) Vandenberg SLC-3W		(United States)	
2 May; 01:46	(United States) KH-4A 51 (OPS 1101)	CIA	Low Earth	Optical imaging	23 May 1969	Successful
2 May; 01:46	(United States) P-11 (OPS 1721)	USAF	Low Earth	Reconnaissance	16 February 1970	Successful
13 May; 09:15	(Soviet Union) Voskhod		(Soviet Union) Plesetsk Site 41/1		(Soviet Union)	
13 May; 09:15	(Soviet Union) Kosmos 281 (Zenit-2 No.74)		Low Earth	Optical imaging	21 May 1969	Successful
18 May; 16:49	(United States) Saturn V		(United States) KSC LC-39B		(United States) NASA	
18 May; 16:49	(United States) Apollo 10 CSM Charlie Brown	NASA	Selenocentric	Crewed Lunar orbital flight	26 May 1969	Successful
18 May; 16:49	(United States) Apollo 10 LM Snoopy	NASA	Selenocentric	Test flight	In orbit	Successful
18 May; 16:49	First test of lunar module in lunar orbit. "Dress rehearsal" of Apollo 11 landing.					
20 May; 08:40	(Soviet Union) Voskhod		(Soviet Union) Plesetsk Site 41/1		(Soviet Union)	
20 May; 08:40	(Soviet Union) Kosmos 282 (Zenit-4 No.57)		Low Earth	Optical imaging	28 May 1969	Successful
22 May; 02:00	(United States) Delta M		(United States) Cape Canaveral LC-17A		(United States) NASA	
22 May; 02:00	(United States) Intelsat III F-4	Intelsat	Geostationary	Communications	In orbit	Successful
23 May; 07:57	(United States) Titan IIIC		(United States) Cape Canaveral SLC-41		(United States)	
23 May; 07:57	(United States) Vela 9, 10	USAF	High Earth	Nuclear detection	In orbit	Successful
23 May; 07:57	(United States) OV5 5, 6, 9	USAF	High Earth	Technology demonstration	In orbit	Successful
27 May; 12:59	(Soviet Union) Kosmos-2I		(Soviet Union) Plesetsk Site 133/1		(Soviet Union)	
27 May; 12:59	(Soviet Union) Kosmos 283 (DS-P1-Yu No.21)		Low Earth	Radar calibration	10 December 1969	Successful
29 May; 06:59	(Soviet Union) Voskhod		(Soviet Union) Baikonur Site 31/6		(Soviet Union)	
29 May; 06:59	(Soviet Union) Kosmos 284 (Zenit-4 No.58)		Low Earth	Optical imaging	6 June 1969	Successful
=== June ===
3 June; 12:57	(Soviet Union) Kosmos-2I		(Soviet Union) Plesetsk Site 133/1		(Soviet Union)	
3 June; 12:57	(Soviet Union) Kosmos 285 (DS-P1-Yu No.22)		Low Earth	Radar calibration	7 October 1969	Successful
3 June; 16:49	(United States) Titan IIIB		(United States) Vandenberg SLC-4W		(United States)	
3 June; 16:49	(United States) KH-8 Gambit 3 (OPS 1077)	USAF	Low Earth	Optical imaging	14 June 1969	Successful
5 June; 14:42	(United States) Thorad-SLV2H Agena-D		(United States) Vandenberg SLC-3W		(United States)	
5 June; 14:42	(United States) OGO 6	NASA	Low Earth	Research	12 October 1979	Successful
14 June; 04:00	(Soviet Union) Proton-K/Blok D		(Soviet Union) Baikonur Site 81/24		(Soviet Union)	
14 June; 04:00	(Soviet Union) Luna E-8-5 No. 402		Selenocentric	Lunar sample return	14 June 1969	Failure
14 June; 04:00	Blok D upper stage failed to ignite, thus leaving the payload on a suborbital trajectory.					
15 June; 08:59	(Soviet Union) Voskhod		(Soviet Union) Plesetsk Site 41/1		(Soviet Union)	
15 June; 08:59	(Soviet Union) Kosmos 286 (Zenit-4 No.59)		Low Earth	Optical imaging	23 June 1969	Successful
21 June; 08:47	(United States) Delta E1		(United States) Vandenberg SLC-2W		(United States)	
21 June; 08:47	(United States) Explorer 41 (IMP-G)	NASA	Highly elliptical	Magnetospheric research	In orbit	Successful
24 June; 06:50	(Soviet Union) Voskhod		(Soviet Union) Baikonur Site 31/6		(Soviet Union)	
24 June; 06:50	(Soviet Union) Kosmos 287 (Zenit-2 No.75)		Low Earth	Optical imaging	2 July 1969	Successful
27 June; 06:59	(Soviet Union) Voskhod		(Soviet Union) Baikonur Site 1/5		(Soviet Union)	
27 June; 06:59	(Soviet Union) Kosmos 288 (Zenit-4 No.60)		Low Earth	Optical imaging	5 July 1969	Successful
29 June; 03:15	(United States) Delta N		(United States) Cape Canaveral LC-17A		(United States)	
29 June; 03:15	(United States) Biosatellite 3	NASA	Low Earth	Life science	7 July 1969	Successful
=== July ===
2 July; 07:04	(Europe) Europa-1		(Australia) Woomera LA-6A		(Europe) ELDO	
2 July; 07:04	(Europe) STV-2	ELDO		Test flight	2 July 1969	Failure
3 July; 20:18	(Soviet Union) N1/L3		(Soviet Union) Baikonur LC-110/38		(Soviet Union)	
3 July; 20:18	(Soviet Union) Zond L1S-2		Selenocentric	Test flight	3 July 1969	Failure
3 July; 20:18	(Soviet Union) Dummy LK		Selenocentric	Mass simulator	3 July 1969	Failure
3 July; 20:18	Exploded due to faulty engines and a bolt that was sucked into a fuel pump.					
10 July; 09:00	(Soviet Union) Voskhod		(Soviet Union) Plesetsk Site 41/1		(Soviet Union)	
10 July; 09:00	(Soviet Union) Kosmos 289 (Zenit-4 No.61)		Low Earth	Optical imaging	15 July 1969	Successful
13 July; 02:54	(Soviet Union) Proton-K/D		(Soviet Union) Baikonur Site 81/24		(Soviet Union)	
13 July; 02:54	(Soviet Union) Luna 15 (Ye-8-5 №401)		Selenocentric	Lunar sample return	20 July 1969	Success
13 July; 02:54	Lander crashed to the surface of the Moon in an attempted landing.					
16 July; 13:32	(United States) Saturn V		(United States) KSC LC-39A		(United States) NASA	
16 July; 13:32	(United States) Apollo 11 CSM Columbia	NASA	Selenocentric	Crewed Lunar orbital flight	24 July 1969	Successful
16 July; 13:32	(United States) Apollo 11 LM Eagle	NASA	Selenocentric	Crewed Lunar landing	In orbit	Successful
16 July; 13:32	First crewed Moon landing.					
22 July; 12:30	(Soviet Union) Voskhod		(Soviet Union) Plesetsk Site 41/1		(Soviet Union)	
22 July; 12:30	(Soviet Union) Kosmos 290 (Zenit-2 No.76)		Low Earth	Optical imaging	30 July 1969	Successful
22 July; 12:55	(Soviet Union) Molniya-M/Blok ML		(Soviet Union) Baikonur Site 1/5		(Soviet Union)	
22 July; 12:55	(Soviet Union) Molniya-1 No.12		Molniya	Communications	18 June 1971	Successful
23 July; 04:39	(United States) Thor-LV2F Burner-2		(United States) Vandenberg SLC-10W		(United States)	
23 July; 04:39	(United States) DSAP-4B F3 (OPS 1127)	USAF, NRO	Low Earth	Meteorology	In orbit	Successful
23 July; 09:00	(Soviet Union) Kosmos-2I		(Soviet Union) Plesetsk Site 133/1		(Soviet Union)	
23 July; 09:00	(Soviet Union) DS-P1-Yu No.23		Low Earth	Radar calibration	23 July 1969	Failure
23 July; 09:00	Second stage failed at T+267 seconds.					
24 July; 01:30	(United States) Thorad-SLV2H-Agena-D		(United States) Vandenberg SLC-3W		(United States)	
24 July; 01:30	(United States) KH-4B 7 (OPS 3654)	CIA	Low Earth	Optical imaging	23 August 1969	Successful
26 July; 02:06	(United States) Delta M		(United States) Cape Canaveral LC-17A		(United States)	
26 July; 02:06	(United States) Intelsat III F-5	Intelsat	Geostationary	Communications	14 October 1988	Failure
26 July; 02:06	Third stage failure left the spacecraft in an unusable orbit.					
31 July; 10:19	(United States) Thorad-SLV2G-Agena-D		(United States) Vandenberg SLC-1W		(United States)	
31 July; 10:19	(United States) Strawman-2 (OPS 8285)	USAF	Low Earth	ELINT	4 January 1973	Successful
=== August ===
6 August; 05:40	(Soviet Union) Tsyklon-2		(Soviet Union) Baikonur Site 90/19		(Soviet Union)	
6 August; 05:40	(Soviet Union) Kosmos 291 (IS-GVM)		Low Earth	Mass simulator	8 September 1969	Successful
6 August; 05:40	First test flight of Tsyklon-2 booster. Flew with a dummy payload planned to be used as an ASAT target but the ASAT interceptor test flight was later cancelled.					
7 August; 23:48	(Soviet Union) Proton-K/Blok D		(Soviet Union) Baikonur Site 81/23		(Soviet Union)	
7 August; 23:48	(Soviet Union) Zond 7		High Earth	Lunar flyby	13 August 1969	Successful
7 August; 23:48	The only successful test flight of Soyuz 7K-L1 spacecraft. Circumlunar flight, perilune 1,984 km.					
9 August; 07:52	(United States) Delta N		(United States) Cape Canaveral LC-17A		(United States)	
9 August; 07:52	(United States) OSO 6	NASA	Low Earth	Solar observatory	7 March 1981	Successful
9 August; 07:52	(United States) PAC 1	NASA	Low Earth	Technology demonstration	28 April 1977	Successful
12 August; 11:01	(United States) Atlas SLV-3C Centaur-D		(United States) Cape Canaveral LC-36A		(United States)	
12 August; 11:01	(United States) ATS-5	NASA	Geosynchronous	Communications	In orbit	Successful
13 August; 22:00	(Soviet Union) Kosmos-3M		(Soviet Union) Plesetsk Site 132/2		(Soviet Union)	
13 August; 22:00	(Soviet Union) Kosmos 292 (Zaliv No.3)		Low Earth	Navigation	In orbit	Successful
16 August; 11:59	(Soviet Union) Voskhod		(Soviet Union) Baikonur Site 31/6		(Soviet Union)	
16 August; 11:59	(Soviet Union) Kosmos 293 (Zenit-2M No.4) / Nauka 5KS L.1		Low Earth	Optical imaging	28 August 1969	Successful
19 August; 13:00	(Soviet Union) Voskhod		(Soviet Union) Plesetsk Site 41/1		(Soviet Union)	
19 August; 13:00	(Soviet Union) Kosmos 294 (Zenit-4 No.62)		Low Earth	Optical imaging	27 August 1969	Successful
22 August; 14:14	(Soviet Union) Kosmos-2I		(Soviet Union) Plesetsk Site 133/1		(Soviet Union)	
22 August; 14:14	(Soviet Union) Kosmos 295 (DS-P1-Yu No.24)		Low Earth	Radar calibration	1 December 1969	Successful
23 August; 16:00	(United States) Titan IIIB		(United States) Vandenberg SLC-4W		(United States)	
23 August; 16:00	(United States) KH-8 Gambit 3 (OPS 7807)	USAF	Low Earth	Optical imaging	7 September 1969	Successful
27 August; 21:59	(United States) Delta L		(United States) Cape Canaveral LC-17A		(United States)	
27 August; 21:59	(United States) Pioneer E	NASA	Heliocentric	Solar orbiter	27 August 1969	Failure
27 August; 21:59	(United States) TETR 3	NASA	Low Earth orbit	Technology demonstration	27 August 1969	Failure
27 August; 21:59	First flight of Delta L rocket. First stage hydraulics failure threw the second stage far off course and the vehicle was destroyed by range safety at T+383 seconds.					
29 August; 09:05	(Soviet Union) Voskhod		(Soviet Union) Baikonur Site 31/6		(Soviet Union)	
29 August; 09:05	(Soviet Union) Kosmos 296 (Zenit-4 No.63)		Low Earth	Optical imaging	6 September 1969	Successful
=== September ===
2 September; 11:00	(Soviet Union) Voskhod		(Soviet Union) Plesetsk Site 41/1		(Soviet Union)	
2 September; 11:00	(Soviet Union) Kosmos 297 (Zenit-4 No.64)		Low Earth	Optical imaging	10 September 1969	Successful
15 September; 08:40	(Soviet Union) R-36O		(Soviet Union) Baikonur Site 191/66		(Soviet Union)	
15 September; 08:40	(Soviet Union) Kosmos 298 (OGCh No.21)		Low Earth	Weapon test	15 September 1969	Successful
18 September; 08:40	(Soviet Union) Voskhod		(Soviet Union) Baikonur Site 31/6		(Soviet Union)	
18 September; 08:40	(Soviet Union) Kosmos 299 (Zenit-4 No.65)		Low Earth	Optical imaging	22 September 1969	Successful
22 September; 02:10	(Japan) Lambda 4S		(Japan) Kagoshima L		(Japan) ISAS	
22 September; 02:10	(Japan) Ōsumi-4	ISAS	Low Earth	Test flight	22 September 1969	Failure
22 September; 21:11	(United States) Thorad-SLV2G-Agena-D		(United States) Vandenberg SLC-3W		(United States)	
22 September; 21:11	(United States) KH-4A 52 (OPS 3531)	CIA	Low Earth	Optical imaging	13 October 1969	Successful
22 September; 21:11	(United States) P-11 (OPS 4710)	USAF	Low Earth	Reconnaissance	16 May 1971	Successful
23 September; 14:07	(Soviet Union) Proton-K/Blok D		(Soviet Union) Baikonur Site 81/24		(Soviet Union)	
23 September; 14:07	(Soviet Union) Kosmos 300 (Luna 16a, Ye-8-5 №403)		Selenocentric	Lunar sample return	27 September 1969	Failure
23 September; 14:07	Blok D stage failed due to valve defect and the probe failed to leave Earth orbit.					
24 September; 12:15	(Soviet Union) Voskhod		(Soviet Union) Plesetsk Site 41/1		(Soviet Union)	
24 September; 12:15	(Soviet Union) Kosmos 301 (Zenit-2 No.77)		Low Earth	Optical imaging	2 October 1969	Successful
30 September; 13:40	(United States) Thorad-SLV2G-Agena-D		(United States) Vandenberg SLC-3W		(United States)	
30 September; 13:40	(United States) Poppy 8A-D (NRL-PL 161-164)	NRL/US Navy	Low Earth	ELINT	In orbit	Successful
30 September; 13:40	(United States) NRL-PL 165	NRL/US Navy	Low Earth	Technology demonstration	In orbit	Successful
30 September; 13:40	(United States) Timation-2	NRL/US Navy	Low Earth	Navigation	In orbit	Successful
30 September; 13:40	(United States) Tempsat 2	NRL	Low Earth	Calibration	In orbit	Successful
30 September; 13:40	(United States) SOICAL Cone & Cylinder	USAF	Low Earth	Calibration	Cone: In orbit Cylinder: 14 February 2023	Successful
30 September; 13:40	(United States) P-11 (OPS 7613)	USAF	Low Earth	Reconnaissance	In orbit	Successful
=== October ===
1 October; 22:29	(United States) Scout-B		(United States) Vandenberg SLC-5		(United States)	
1 October; 22:29	(Europe) ESRO 1B	ESRO	Low Earth	Research	In orbit	Partial failure
1 October; 22:29	Orbit was lower than planned.					
6 October; 01:45	(Soviet Union) Vostok-2M		(Soviet Union) Plesetsk Site 41/1		(Soviet Union)	
6 October; 01:45	(Soviet Union) Meteor-1 2		Low Earth	Meteorology	20 August 2002	Successful
11 October; 11:10	(Soviet Union) Soyuz		(Soviet Union) Baikonur LC-31/6		(Soviet Union) RVSN	
11 October; 11:10	(Soviet Union) Soyuz 6	RVSN	Low Earth	Crewed orbital flight	16 October 1969	Partial failure
11 October; 11:10	Rendezvous with Soyuz 7 and 8 unsuccessful due to electronic failure.					
12 October; 10:44	(Soviet Union) Soyuz		(Soviet Union) Baikonur LC-1/5		(Soviet Union) RVSN	
12 October; 10:44	(Soviet Union) Soyuz 7	RVSN	Low Earth	Crewed orbital flight	16 October 1969	Partial failure
12 October; 10:44	Rendezvous with Soyuz 6 and 8 unsuccessful due to electronic failure.					
13 October; 10:19	(Soviet Union) Soyuz		(Soviet Union) Baikonur LC-31/6		(Soviet Union) RVSN	
13 October; 10:19	(Soviet Union) Soyuz 8	RVSN	Low Earth	Crewed orbital flight	16 October 1969	Partial failure
13 October; 10:19	Rendezvous with Soyuz 6 and 7 unsuccessful due to electronic failure.					
14 October; 13:19	(Soviet Union) Kosmos-2I		(Soviet Union) Plesetsk Site 133/1		(Soviet Union)	
14 October; 13:19	(Soviet Union) Interkosmos 1 (DS-U3-IK No.1)	Interkosmos	Low Earth	Solar research	2 January 1970	Successful
17 October; 11:45	(Soviet Union) Voskhod		(Soviet Union) Plesetsk Site 41/1		(Soviet Union)	
17 October; 11:45	(Soviet Union) Kosmos 302 (Zenit-4 No.66)		Low Earth	Optical imaging	25 October 1969	Successful
18 October; 10:00	(Soviet Union) Kosmos-2I		(Soviet Union) Plesetsk Site 133/1		(Soviet Union)	
18 October; 10:00	(Soviet Union) Kosmos 303 (DS-P1-Yu No.25)		Low Earth	Radar calibration	23 January 1970	Successful
21 October; 12:49	(Soviet Union) Kosmos-3M		(Soviet Union) Plesetsk Site 132		(Soviet Union)	
21 October; 12:49	(Soviet Union) Kosmos 304 (Zaliv No.4)		Low Earth	Navigation	In orbit	Successful
22 October; 14:09	(Soviet Union) Proton-K/Blok D		(Soviet Union) Baikonur Site 81/24		(Soviet Union)	
22 October; 14:09	(Soviet Union) Kosmos 305 (Luna 16b, Ye-8-5 №404)		Selenocentric	Lunar sample return	In orbit	Failure
22 October; 14:09	Control system of the Blok D stage failed and the probe failed to leave Earth orbit.					
24 October; 09:40	(Soviet Union) Voskhod		(Soviet Union) Baikonur Site 1/5		(Soviet Union)	
24 October; 09:40	(Soviet Union) Kosmos 306 (Zenit-2M No.5)		Low Earth	Optical imaging	5 November 1969	Successful
24 October; 13:01	(Soviet Union) Kosmos-2I		(Soviet Union) Kapustin Yar Site 86/4		(Soviet Union)	
24 October; 13:01	(Soviet Union) Kosmos 307 (DS-P1-Yu No.26)		Low Earth	Radar calibration	30 December 1970	Successful
24 October; 18:10	(United States) Titan IIIB		(United States) Vandenberg SLC-4W		(United States)	
24 October; 18:10	(United States) KH-8 Gambit 3 (OPS 8455)	USAF	Low Earth	Optical imaging	8 November 1969	Successful
=== November ===
4 November; 11:59	(Soviet Union) Kosmos-2I		(Soviet Union) Plesetsk Site 133/1		(Soviet Union)	
4 November; 11:59	(Soviet Union) Kosmos 308 (DS-P1-I No.6)		Low Earth	Radar calibration	4 January 1970	Successful
8 November; 01:52	(United States) Scout-B		(United States) Vandenberg SLC-5		(United States)	
8 November; 01:52	(West Germany) Azur	BMWF/DLR	Medium Earth	Ionospheric research	In orbit	Successful
8 November; 01:52	First West German satellite					
12 November; 11:30	(Soviet Union) Voskhod		(Soviet Union) Plesetsk Site 41/1		(Soviet Union)	
12 November; 11:30	(Soviet Union) Kosmos 309 (Zenit-2 No.78) / Nauka 3KS L.1		Low Earth	Optical imaging	20 November 1969	Successful
14 November; 16:22	(United States) Saturn V		(United States) KSC LC-39A		(United States) NASA	
14 November; 16:22	(United States) Apollo 12 CSM Yankee Clipper	NASA	Selenocentric	Crewed Lunar orbital flight	24 November 1969	Successful
14 November; 16:22	(United States) Apollo 12 LM Intrepid	NASA	Selenocentric	Crewed Lunar landing	20 November 1969	Successful
14 November; 16:22	Second crewed Moon landing.					
15 November; 08:30	(Soviet Union) Voskhod		(Soviet Union) Baikonur Site 31/6		(Soviet Union)	
15 November; 08:30	(Soviet Union) Kosmos 310 (Zenit-4 No.67)		Low Earth	Optical imaging	23 November 1969	Successful
22 November; 02:00	(United States) Delta M		(United States) Cape Canaveral LC-17A		(United States)	
22 November; 02:00	(United Kingdom) Skynet 1A	MoD	Geostationary	Communications (military)	In orbit	Successful
24 November; 11:00	(Soviet Union) Kosmos-2I		(Soviet Union) Plesetsk Site 133/1		(Soviet Union)	
24 November; 11:00	(Soviet Union) Kosmos 311 (DS-P1-Yu No.27)		Low Earth	Radar calibration	10 March 1970	Successful
24 November; 16:49	(Soviet Union) Kosmos-3M		(Soviet Union) Plesetsk Site 132		(Soviet Union)	
24 November; 16:49	(Soviet Union) Kosmos 312 (Sfera No.5)		Low Earth	Geodesy	In orbit	Successful
28 November; 09:00	(Soviet Union) Proton-K/Blok D		(Soviet Union) Baikonur Site 81/23		(Soviet Union)	
28 November; 09:00	(Soviet Union) Soyuz 7K-L1E		Medium Earth	Flight test	In orbit	Failure
28 November; 09:00	First stage failure					
=== December ===
3 December; 13:20	(Soviet Union) Voskhod		(Soviet Union) Plesetsk Site 41/1		(Soviet Union)	
3 December; 13:20	(Soviet Union) Kosmos 313 (Zenit-2M No.6) / Gektor No.6		Low Earth	Optical imaging	15 December 1969	Successful
4 December; 21:37	(United States) Thorad-SLV2H-Agena-D		(United States) Vandenberg SLC-3W		(United States)	
4 December; 21:37	(United States) KH-4B 8 (OPS 6617)	CIA	Low Earth	Optical imaging	10 January 1970	Successful
11 December; 12:58	(Soviet Union) Kosmos-2I		(Soviet Union) Plesetsk Site 133/1		(Soviet Union)	
11 December; 12:58	(Soviet Union) Kosmos 314 (DS-P1-Yu No.28)		Low Earth	Radar calibration	22 March 1970	Successful
20 December; 03:26	(Soviet Union) Kosmos-3M		(Soviet Union) Plesetsk Site 132		(Soviet Union)	
20 December; 03:26	(Soviet Union) Kosmos 315 (Tselina-O No.5)		Low Earth	ELINT	25 March 1979	Successful
23 December; 09:25	(Soviet Union) Tsyklon-2		(Soviet Union) Baikonur Site 90/19		(Soviet Union)	
23 December; 09:25	(Soviet Union) Kosmos 316 (I2P No.3)		Low Earth	Dummy ASAT warhead	28 August 1970	Successful
23 December; 13:50	(Soviet Union) Voskhod		(Soviet Union) Plesetsk Site 41/1		(Soviet Union)	
23 December; 13:50	(Soviet Union) Kosmos 317 (Zenit-4MK No.1 / Germes No.1)		Low Earth	Optical imaging	5 January 1970	Successful
25 December; 09:59	(Soviet Union) Kosmos-2I		(Soviet Union) Kapustin Yar Site 86/4		(Soviet Union)	
25 December; 09:59	(Soviet Union) Interkosmos 2 (DS-U1-IK No.1)	Interkosmos	Low Earth	Ionosphere research	7 June 1970	Successful
27 December	(Soviet Union) Kosmos-3M		(Soviet Union) Plesetsk Site 132		(Soviet Union)	
27 December	(Soviet Union) Ionosfernaya No.1		Low Earth	Ionosphere research	In orbit	Failure

- ← Jan
- Feb
- Mar
- Apr
- May
- Jun
- Jul
- Aug
- Sep
- Oct
- Nov
- Dec →

== Suborbital flights ==
Date and time (UTC)	Rocket	Flight number	Launch site		LSP	
Date and time (UTC)	Payload (⚀ = CubeSat)	Operator	Orbit	Function	Decay (UTC)	Outcome
Date and time (UTC)	Remarks					
=== January-March ===
17 January	(United States) Nike-Cajun		(Sweden) Esrange		(United States) NASA	
17 January	(Sweden) / (United States) RTG SNC 2A / 1 Aeronomy mission	NASA/RTG	Suborbital	Aeronomy	17 January	Successful
17 January	Apogee: 117 kilometres (73 mi).					
21 January	(United Kingdom) Skylark 6		(Australia) Woomera LA-2 SL		(United Kingdom) British Aerospace	
21 January	(United Kingdom) UK SL781 Solar x-ray mission	RAE/WRE	Suborbital	Astronomy	21 January	Failure
23 January; 20:00	(United Kingdom) Skylark		(Australia) Woomera LA-2 SL		(United Kingdom) British Aerospace	
23 January; 20:00	(United Kingdom) / Ion / Te Ionosphere mission	RAE/WRE	Suborbital	Astronomy	23 January	Successful
23 January; 20:00	Apogee: 149 kilometres (93 mi).					
23 January; 23:00	(United States) Nike-Cajun		(Sweden) Esrange		(United States) NASA	
23 January; 23:00	(Sweden) / (United States) RTG SNC 2A / 3 Aeronomy mission	NASA/RTG	Suborbital	Aeronomy	23 January	Successful
23 January; 23:00	Apogee: 116 kilometres (72 mi).					
25 January; 21:00	(United States) Nike-Cajun		(Sweden) Esrange		(United States) NASA	
25 January; 21:00	(Sweden) / (United States) RTG SNC 2A / 4 Aeronomy mission	NASA/RTG	Suborbital	Aeronomy	25 January	Successful
25 January; 21:00	Apogee: 118 kilometres (73 mi).					
3 February; 21:05	(United Kingdom) Petrel		(Sweden) Esrange		(Canada) Bristol Aerospace	
3 February; 21:05	(United Kingdom) Electrons Ionosphere mission	SRC	Suborbital	Ionosphere research	3 February	Successful
3 February; 21:05	Apogee: 157 kilometres (98 mi).					
11 February; 21:09	(United Kingdom) Petrel		(Sweden) Esrange		(Canada) Bristol Aerospace	
11 February; 21:09	(United Kingdom) Electrons Ionosphere mission	SRC	Suborbital	Ionosphere research	11 February	Successful
11 February; 21:09	Apogee: 157 kilometres (98 mi).					
14 February; 22:15	(United Kingdom) Petrel		(Sweden) Esrange		(Canada) Bristol Aerospace	
14 February; 22:15	(United Kingdom) Small scale structure Ionosphere mission	SRC	Suborbital	Ionosphere research	14 February	Successful
14 February; 22:15	Apogee: 149 kilometres (93 mi).					
15 February; 21:20	(United Kingdom) Petrel		(Sweden) Esrange		(Canada) Bristol Aerospace	
15 February; 21:20	(United Kingdom) Small scale structure Ionosphere mission	SRC	Suborbital	Ionosphere research	15 February	Successful
15 February; 21:20	Apogee: 153 kilometres (95 mi).					
20 February; 11:48	(France) Véronique		(France) Kourou ALFS		(France) LRBA	
20 February; 11:48	FU-170 CIRCE	CNES	Suborbital	Ionosphere research	20 February	Successful
20 February; 11:48	Apogee: 107 kilometres (66 mi)					
25 February; 16:33	(France) Centaure 2B		(Norway) Andøya Rocket Range			
25 February; 16:33	(Europe) ESRO C49 / 1 (R3) Aurora mission	ESRO	Suborbital		25 February	Successful
25 February; 16:33	Apogee: 136 kilometres (85 mi).					
25 February; 21:37	(United States) Sidewinder Arcas		(Norway) Andøya Rocket Range			
25 February; 21:37	(Europe) ESRO A40 / 4 Ionosphere / plasma / field mission	ESRO	Suborbital		25 February	Failure
25 February; 23:50	(France) Centaure 2B		(Norway) Andøya Rocket Range			
25 February; 23:50	(Europe) ESRO C49 / 2 Aurora mission	ESRO	Suborbital		25 February	Successful
25 February; 23:50	Apogee: 128 kilometres (80 mi).					
15 March; 17:55	(United States) Nike-Apache		(Sweden) Esrange		(United States) Sandia	
15 March; 17:55	(West Germany) DLR K-NA-11	DFVLR	Suborbital	Ionosphere research, Aeronomy	15 March	Successful
15 March; 17:55	Apogee: 226 kilometres (140 mi).					
15 March; 20:54	(United Kingdom) Skylark 2		(Sweden) Esrange		(United Kingdom) British Aerospace	
15 March; 20:54	(Europe) ESRO S43 / 2 Aurora mission	ESRO	Suborbital		15 March	Successful
15 March; 20:54	Apogee: 211 kilometres (131 mi).					
15 March; 22:31	(France) Centaure 2B		(Sweden) Esrange			
15 March; 22:31	(Europe) ESRO C52 / 1 Aurora mission	ESRO	Suborbital		15 March	Successful
15 March; 22:31	Apogee: 211 kilometres (131 mi).					
16 March; 18:05	(United States) Nike-Apache		(Sweden) Esrange		(United States) Sandia	
16 March; 18:05	(West Germany) DLR K-NA-17	DFVLR	Suborbital	Ionosphere research, Aeronomy	16 March	Successful
16 March; 18:05	Apogee: 233 kilometres (145 mi).					
17 March; 00:04	(United Kingdom) Petrel		(Sweden) Esrange		(Canada) Bristol Aerospace	
17 March; 00:04	(United Kingdom) Particles Ionosphere mission	SRC	Suborbital	Ionosphere research	17 March	Successful
17 March; 00:04	Apogee: 151 kilometres (94 mi).					
17 March; 18:10	(United States) Nike-Apache		(Sweden) Esrange		(United States) Sandia	
17 March; 18:10	(West Germany) DLR K-NA-18	DFVLR	Suborbital	Ionosphere research, Aeronomy	17 March	Successful
17 March; 18:10	Apogee: 231 kilometres (144 mi).					
17 March; 18:23	(United Kingdom) Petrel		(Sweden) Esrange		(Canada) Bristol Aerospace	
17 March; 18:23	(United Kingdom) E field gradient Ionosphere mission	SRC	Suborbital	Ionosphere research	17 March	Successful
17 March; 18:23	Apogee: 148 kilometres (92 mi).					
18 March; 18:16	(United Kingdom) Petrel		(Sweden) Esrange		(Canada) Bristol Aerospace	
18 March; 18:16	(United Kingdom) E-region E field Ionosphere mission	SRC	Suborbital	Ionosphere research	18 March	Successful
18 March; 18:16	Apogee: 170 kilometres (110 mi).					
20 March; 05:37	(United States) Terrier Sandhawk		(United States) Poker Flat Research Range		(United States) Sandia	
20 March; 05:37	HEMLOCK	DARPA	Suborbital	Aeronomy	20 March	Successful
20 March; 05:37	Apogee: 176 kilometres (109 mi)					
29 March; 20:00	(United Kingdom) Petrel		(Sweden) Esrange		(Canada) Bristol Aerospace	
29 March; 20:00	(United Kingdom) Small scale structure Ionosphere mission	SRC	Suborbital	Ionosphere research	29 March	Successful
29 March; 20:00	Apogee: 150 kilometres (93 mi).					
=== April-June ===
1 April; 09:54	(United Kingdom) Skylark		(Australia) Woomera LA-2 SL		(United Kingdom) British Aerospace	
1 April; 09:54	(United Kingdom) X-ray Survey X-ray astronomy mission	BAC	Suborbital	Astronomy	1 April	Successful
1 April; 09:54	Apogee: 192 kilometres (119 mi).					
3 April; 00:35	(United Kingdom) Skylark 6 AC		(Australia) Woomera LA-2 SL		(United Kingdom) British Aerospace	
3 April; 00:35	(United Kingdom) UK SL502 Ionosphere / solar x-rays mission	BAC	Suborbital	Astronomy	3 April	Successful
3 April; 00:35	Apogee: 192 kilometres (119 mi).					
9 April; 20:38	(United States) Nike-Apache		(Norway) Andøya Rocket Range		(United States) Sandia	
9 April; 20:38	(Norway) Ferdinand 20 Aeronomy / ionosphere / plasma mission	NTNF	Suborbital	Ionosphere research, Aeronomy	9 April	Successful
9 April; 20:38	Apogee: 139 kilometres (86 mi).					
13 April; 00:33	(France) Dragon 2B		(Norway) Andøya Rocket Range			
13 April; 00:33	(France) FU-182 Ions / Electric field Ionosphere mission	CNES	Suborbital	Ionosphere research	13 April	Successful
13 April; 00:33	Apogee: 139 kilometres (86 mi).					
14 April; 18:15	(France) Centaure 2B		(Sweden) Esrange C			
14 April; 18:15	(Europe) ESRO C39 / 1 Aurora mission	ESRO	Suborbital		14 April	Failure
15 April; 11:03	(France) Centaure 2B		(Sweden) Esrange C			
15 April; 11:03	(Europe) ESRO C39 / 2 Aurora mission	ESRO	Suborbital		15 April	Successful
15 April; 11:03	Apogee: 134 kilometres (83 mi).					
16 April	(Argentina) Canopus 2		(Argentina) CELPA		(Argentina) CONAE	
16 April		CONAE	Suborbital	Test flight	16 April	Successful
16 April	First flight of Canopus 2 sounding rocket. Apogee: 150 kilometres (93 mi).					
17 April; 05:05	(United Kingdom) Skylark 3 AC		(Australia) Woomera LA-2 SL		(United Kingdom) British Aerospace	
17 April; 05:05	(United Kingdom) UK SL606 Solar ultraviolet and x-ray mission	BAC	Suborbital	Astronomy	17 April	Successful
17 April; 05:05	Apogee: 202 kilometres (126 mi).					
17 April; 21:48	(France) Dragon 2B		(Norway) Andøya Rocket Range			
17 April; 21:48	(France) FU-190 E field / Barium release / Ionosphere mission	CNES	Suborbital		17 April	Successful
17 April; 21:48	Apogee: 329 kilometres (204 mi).					
22 April; 03:31	(United Kingdom) Skylark 3 AC		(Australia) Woomera LA-2 SL		(United Kingdom) British Aerospace	
22 April; 03:31	(United Kingdom) UK SL604 Solar ultraviolet mission	BAC	Suborbital	Astronomy	22 April	Successful
22 April; 03:31	Apogee: 181 kilometres (112 mi).					
1 May	(United States) Sandhawk Tomahawk		(United States) Pacific Missile Range Facility		(United States) Sandia	
1 May		Sandia National Laboratories	Suborbital	Test flight	1 May	Successful
1 May	First flight of the Sandhawk Tomahawk configuration. Apogee: 528 kilometres (328 mi).					
14 May; 02:44	(United Kingdom) Skylark 3 AC		(Australia) Woomera LA-2 SL		(United Kingdom) British Aerospace	
14 May; 02:44	(United Kingdom) UK SL404 Solar ultraviolet and x-ray mission	BAC	Suborbital	Astronomy	14 May	Successful
14 May; 02:44	Apogee: 178 kilometres (111 mi).					
24 May; 05:52	(United States) Terrier Tomahawk		(United States) Pacific Missile Range Facility		(United States) Sandia	
24 May; 05:52	LRL BOX-16 TT-9	Sandia National Laboratories	Suborbital	Astronomy	24 May	Successful
24 May; 05:52	Apogee: 159 kilometres (99 mi)					
5 June; 19:28	(France) Centaure 2B		(Sweden) Esrange C			
5 June; 19:28	(Europe) ESRO C35 / 2 X-ray astronomy mission	ESRO	Suborbital		5 June	Successful
5 June; 19:28	Apogee: 130 kilometres (81 mi).					
27 June; 22:58	(United Kingdom) Black Arrow	R0	(Australia) Woomera LA-5B		(United Kingdom) RAE	
27 June; 22:58		RAE	Suborbital	Test flight	27 June	Failure
27 June; 22:58	Test flight with inert third stage. Lost control 50 seconds into the flight, destroyed by range safety.					
=== July-September ===
5 July; 19:45	(United Kingdom) Skylark		(Italy) Salto di Quirra		(United Kingdom) British Aerospace	
5 July; 19:45	(Europe) ESRO S38 / 1 Ionosphere mission	ESRO	Suborbital	Ionosphere research	5 July	Successful
5 July; 19:45	Apogee: 200 kilometres (120 mi).					
6 July; 19:50	(United Kingdom) Skylark 3		(Italy) Salto di Quirra		(United Kingdom) British Aerospace	
6 July; 19:50	(Europe) ESRO S64 / 1 Aeronomy mission	ESRO	Suborbital	Aeronomy	6 July	Successful
6 July; 19:50	Apogee: 275 kilometres (171 mi).					
11 July; 19:42	(United Kingdom) Skylark		(Italy) Salto di Quirra		(United Kingdom) British Aerospace	
11 July; 19:42	(Europe) ESRO S38 / 2 Ionosphere mission	ESRO	Suborbital	Ionosphere research	11 July	Successful
11 July; 19:42	Apogee: 203 kilometres (126 mi).					
13 July; 19:41	(United Kingdom) Skylark 3		(Italy) Salto di Quirra		(United Kingdom) British Aerospace	
13 July; 19:41	(Europe) ESRO S64 / 2 Aeronomy mission	ESRO	Suborbital	Aeronomy	13 July	Successful
13 July; 19:41	Apogee: 280 kilometres (170 mi).					
14 July; 23:53	(United Kingdom) Skylark		(Australia) Woomera LA-2 SL		(United Kingdom) British Aerospace	
14 July; 23:53	(United Kingdom) Electron profile Ionosphere mission	BAC	Suborbital	Ionosphere research	14 July	Successful
14 July; 23:53	Apogee: 216 kilometres (134 mi).					
15 July	(Soviet Union) K63D		(Soviet Union) Vladimirovka near Kapustin Yar			
15 July	(Soviet Union) BOR-1		Suborbital	Re-entry test for the Spiral program	15 July	Successful
15 July	Subscale model of the Spiral spaceplane, transmitted data until burning up as planned at 60-70 km altitude. Apogee: 100 km					
16 July; 22:33	(United Kingdom) Skylark		(Australia) Woomera LA-2 SL		(United Kingdom) British Aerospace	
16 July; 22:33	(United Kingdom) Dayglow / electrons Ionosphere mission	BAC	Suborbital	Ionosphere research	16 July	Successful
16 July; 22:33	Apogee: 244 kilometres (152 mi).					
24 July	(Australia) HAD		(Australia) Woomera LA-1		(Australia) WRE	
24 July		WRE	Suborbital	Test flight	24 July	Successful
24 July	Apogee: 115 kilometres (71 mi)					
25 July; 04:10	(United Kingdom) Skylark		(Australia) Woomera LA-2 SL		(United Kingdom) British Aerospace	
25 July; 04:10	(United Kingdom) Electron profile Ionosphere mission	BAC	Suborbital	Ionosphere research	25 July	Successful
25 July; 04:10	Apogee: 244 kilometres (152 mi).					
29 July; 22:57	(United Kingdom) Skylark 3		(Australia) Woomera LA-2 SL		(United Kingdom) British Aerospace	
29 July; 22:57	(United Kingdom) Dayglow / electrons Ionosphere mission	BAC	Suborbital	Ionosphere research	29 July	Successful
29 July; 22:57	Apogee: 262 kilometres (163 mi).					
5 August; 09:08	(Australia) Aero High		(Australia) Woomera LA-1		(Australia) WRE	
5 August; 09:08		WRE	Suborbital		5 August	Successful
5 August; 09:08	Apogee: 208 kilometres (129 mi)					
11 August; 01:30	(France) Centaure 2B		(Sweden) Esrange C			
11 August; 01:30	(Europe) ESRO C51 / 1 Aeronomy mission	ESRO	Suborbital	Aeronomy	11 August	Successful
11 August; 01:30	Apogee: 112 kilometres (70 mi).					
14 August; 02:01	(France) Centaure 2B		(Sweden) Esrange C			
14 August; 02:01	(Europe) ESRO C58 / 1 Meteorites mission	ESRO	Suborbital		11 August	Successful
14 August; 02:01	Apogee: 112 kilometres (70 mi).					
21 August; 01:57	(United Kingdom) Skylark 3 AC		(Australia) Woomera LA-2 SL		(United Kingdom) British Aerospace	
21 August; 01:57	(United Kingdom) HRCS / PHC Solar x-ray mission	BAC	Suborbital	Astronomy	29 July	Successful
21 August; 01:57	Apogee: 197 kilometres (122 mi).					
12 September	(Argentina) Rigel		(Argentina) CELPA		(Argentina) CONAE	
12 September		CONAE	Suborbital	Test flight	12 September	Successful
12 September	First test flight of Rigel sounding rocket. Apogee: 250 kilometres (160 mi)					
=== October-December ===
5 October; 22:28	(United Kingdom) Skylark 2		(Sweden) Esrange		(United Kingdom) British Aerospace	
5 October; 22:28	(Europe) ESRO S29 / 1 Aurora mission	ESRO	Suborbital		5 October	Successful
5 October; 22:28	Apogee: 225 kilometres (140 mi).					
10 October; 20:01	(France) Centaure 2B		(Sweden) Esrange C			
10 October; 20:01	(Europe) ESRO C52 / 2 Aurora mission	ESRO	Suborbital		10 October	Successful
10 October; 20:01	Apogee: 135 kilometres (84 mi).					
15 October; 18:46	(United Kingdom) Skylark 3		(Australia) Woomera LA-2 SL		(United Kingdom) British Aerospace	
15 October; 18:46	(United Kingdom) Grenades / TMA/Barium release Aeronomy / ionosphere mission	BAC	Suborbital	Ionosphere research	15 October	Successful
15 October; 18:46	Apogee: 318 kilometres (198 mi).					
17 October; 09:15	(United Kingdom) Skylark 3		(Australia) Woomera LA-2 SL		(United Kingdom) British Aerospace	
17 October; 09:15	(United Kingdom) Grenades / TMA/Barium release Aeronomy / ionosphere mission	BAC	Suborbital	Ionosphere research	17 October	Successful
17 October; 09:15	Apogee: 318 kilometres (198 mi).					
17 October; 22:27	(United Kingdom) Skylark 2		(Sweden) Esrange		(United Kingdom) British Aerospace	
17 October; 22:27	(Europe) ESRO S29 / 2 Aurora mission	ESRO	Suborbital		17 October	Successful
17 October; 22:27	Apogee: 225 kilometres (140 mi).					
20 October; 07:28	(United Kingdom) Skylark 3 AC		(Australia) Woomera LA-2 SL		(United Kingdom) British Aerospace	
20 October; 07:28	(United Kingdom) UK SL586 test	BAC	Suborbital	Technology demonstration	20 October	Successful
20 October; 07:28	Apogee: 223 kilometres (139 mi).					
22 October; 06:10	(United Kingdom) Skylark 3		(Australia) Woomera LA-2 SL		(United Kingdom) British Aerospace	
22 October; 06:10	(United Kingdom) X-ray survey / Solar X X-ray astronomy mission	BAC	Suborbital	Astronomy	22 October	Successful
22 October; 06:10	Apogee: 216 kilometres (134 mi).					
23 October	(Argentina) Canopus 2		(Argentina) CELPA		(Argentina) CONAE	
23 October		CONAE	Suborbital	Test flight	23 October	Successful
23 October	Apogee: 150 kilometres (93 mi).					
24 October; 05:44	(United Kingdom) Skylark		(Italy) Salto di Quirra		(United Kingdom) British Aerospace	
24 October; 05:44	(Europe) ESRO S68 / 1 X-ray astronomy mission	ESRO	Suborbital	Astronomy	13 July	Successful
24 October; 05:44	Apogee: 184 kilometres (114 mi).					
8 November	(France) Vesta		(France) Kourou ALFS		(France) LRBA	
8 November	FU-189 Star pointing test	CNES	Suborbital	Technology demonstration	8 November	Successful
8 November	Last flight of the Vesta sounding rocket. Apogee: 204 kilometres (127 mi).					
10 November; 21:00	(United Kingdom) Skylark 2		(Sweden) Esrange		(United Kingdom) British Aerospace	
10 November; 21:00	(Europe) ESRO S46 / 1 Aurora mission	ESRO	Suborbital		10 November	Successful
10 November; 21:00	Apogee: 214 kilometres (133 mi).					
18 November; 02:17	(United Kingdom) Skylark 3 AC		(Australia) Woomera LA-2 SL		(United Kingdom) British Aerospace	
18 November; 02:17	(United Kingdom) Fresnel shadowgraph X-ray astronomy mission	BAC	Suborbital	Astronomy	18 November	Failure
18 November; 02:17	Apogee: 208 kilometres (129 mi).					
20 November; 00:30	(United Kingdom) Skylark 3 AC		(Australia) Woomera LA-2 SL		(United Kingdom) British Aerospace	
20 November; 00:30	(United Kingdom) Solar ultraviolet Spectrum / PHC Solar ultraviolet and x-ray mission	BAC	Suborbital	Astronomy	20 November	Successful
20 November; 00:30	Apogee: 242 kilometres (150 mi).					
26 November; 00:38	(United States) Nike-Cajun		(Norway) Andøya Rocket Range		(United States) NASA	
26 November; 00:38	(Norway) Ferdinand 21 Aeronomy / ionosphere mission	NTNF	Suborbital	Ionosphere research, Aeronomy	26 November	Successful
26 November; 00:38	Apogee: 107 kilometres (66 mi).					
26 November; 23:32	(United Kingdom) Skylark 3 AC		(Australia) Woomera LA-2 SL		(United Kingdom) British Aerospace	
26 November; 23:32	(United Kingdom) Solar ultraviolet FP / PHC Solar ultraviolet mission	BAC	Suborbital	Astronomy	26 November	Successful
26 November; 23:32	Apogee: 180 kilometres (110 mi).					
27 November; 05:29	(France) Centaure 2B		(Sweden) Esrange C			
27 November; 05:29	(Europe) ESRO C62 / 1 Aurora mission	ESRO	Suborbital		27 November	Successful
27 November; 05:29	Apogee: 160 kilometres (99 mi).					
27 November; 06:31	(France) Centaure 2B		(Sweden) Esrange C			
27 November; 06:31	(Europe) ESRO C62 / 2 Aurora mission	ESRO	Suborbital		27 November	Successful
27 November; 06:31	Apogee: 164 kilometres (102 mi).					
30 November; 02:58	(United States) Sparrow-Arcas		(Norway) Andøya Rocket Range		(United States) NASA	
30 November; 02:58	(Norway) Arcas VII Aeronomy / ionosphere / plasma mission	NTNF	Suborbital	Ionosphere research, Aeronomy	30 November	Successful
30 November; 02:58	Apogee: 100 kilometres (62 mi).					
6 December; 06:00	(Soviet Union) K63D		(Soviet Union) Vladimirovka near Kapustin Yar			
6 December; 06:00	(Soviet Union) BOR-2 No.101		Suborbital	Re-entry test for the Spiral program	6 December	Successful
6 December; 06:00	Subscale model of the Spiral spaceplane. Apogee: 100 km					
9 December	(Australia) HAD		(Australia) Woomera LA-1		(Australia) WRE	
9 December		WRE	Suborbital	Test flight	9 December	Successful
9 December	Last flight of HAD rocket. Apogee: 115 kilometres (71 mi).					
22 December	(Argentina) Rigel		(Argentina) CELPA		(Argentina) CONAE	
22 December		CONAE	Suborbital	Test flight	22 December	Successful
22 December	Apogee: 250 kilometres (160 mi)					
23 December	(Argentina) Canopus 2		(Argentina) CELPA		(Argentina) CONAE	
23 December		CONAE	Suborbital	Test flight	23 December	Successful
23 December	Apogee: 150 kilometres (93 mi).					

== Launches from the Moon ==
Date and time (UTC)	Rocket	Flight number	Launch site		LSP	
Date and time (UTC)	Payload (⚀ = CubeSat)	Operator	Orbit	Function	Decay (UTC)	Outcome
Date and time (UTC)	Remarks					
21 July; 17:54	(United States) Lunar Module Ascent Stage		Tranquility Base, Mare Tranquillitatis (Luna)		(United States) NASA	
21 July; 17:54	(United States) Apollo 11 LM	NASA	Selenocentric (CSM)	Crewed	In orbit	Successful
21 July; 17:54	Carrying two astronauts back to CSM after lunar landing					
20 November; 14:25:47	(United States) Lunar Module Ascent Stage		Ocean of Storms (Luna)		(United States) NASA	
20 November; 14:25:47	(United States) Apollo 12 LM	NASA	Selenocentric (CSM)	Crewed	20 November	Successful
20 November; 14:25:47	Carrying two astronauts back to CSM after lunar landing					

== Deep-space rendezvous ==
Date (GMT)	Spacecraft	Event	Remarks
16 May	Venera 5	Atmospheric entry in Venus	Atmospheric probe worked for 53 min in the Venerian atmosphere
17 May	Venera 6	Atmospheric entry in Venus	Atmospheric probe worked for 51 min in the Venerian atmosphere
21 May	Apollo 10	31 orbits around the Moon	Altitude ~15,4 km
20 July	Apollo 11	Moon landing	22 kg from Mare Tranquillitatis (sample return mission)
21 July	Luna 15	Moon impact	Impacted at Mare Crisium (sample return mission). Primary mission failed.
5 August	Mariner 6	Flyby of Mars	Periapsis: 3,412 km. 25 close-up pictures.
5 August	Mariner 7	Flyby of Mars	Periapsis: 3,543 km. 33 close-up pictures.
11 August	Zond 7	Circumlunar flight	Periapsis: 1,984 km.
19 November	Apollo 12	Moon landing	34 kg from Oceanus Procellarum (sample return mission)

== Extravehicular activities (EVAs) ==
Start date/time	Duration	End time	Spacecraft	Crew	Remarks

== Orbital launch statistics ==
=== By country ===
Country	Launches	Successes	Failures	Partial failures
Europe	1	0	1	0
Japan	1	0	1	0
Soviet Union	82	68	14	0
United States	41	37	2	2
World	125	105	18	2

=== By rocket ===
==== By family ====
Family	Country	Launches	Successes	Failures	Partial failures	Remarks
Atlas	United States	5	5	0	0	
Blue Streak	Europe	1	0	1	0	
Kosmos	Soviet Union	22	20	2	0	
Lambda	Japan	1	0	1	0	
N-1	Soviet Union	2	0	2	0	First flight
R-7	Soviet Union	44	43	1	0	
R-36	Soviet Union	4	3	1	0	
Saturn	United States	4	4	0	0	
Scout	United States	2	1	0	1	
Thor	United States	22	20	2	0	
Titan	United States	8	7	0	1	
Universal Rocket	Soviet Union	10	2	8	0	

==== By type ====
Rocket	Country	Family	Launches	Successes	Failures	Partial failures	Remarks
Atlas-Agena	United States	Atlas	1	1	0	0	
Atlas-Centaur	United States	Atlas	3	3	0	0	
Atlas E/F	United States	Atlas	1	1	0	0	
Delta	United States	Thor	11	9	2	0	
Europa	Europe	Blue Streak	1	0	1	0	
Kosmos-2	Soviet Union	Kosmos	15	14	1	0	
Kosmos-3	Soviet Union	Kosmos	7	6	1	0	
Lambda 4	Japan	Lambda	1	0	1	0	
Molniya	Soviet Union	R-7	4	4	0	0	
N-1	Soviet Union	N-1	2	0	2	0	First flight
Proton	Soviet Union	Universal Rocket	10	2	8	0	
R-36	Soviet Union	R-36	1	1	0	0	
Saturn V	United States	Saturn	4	4	0	0	
Scout	United States	Scout	2	1	0	1	
Soyuz	Soviet Union	R-7	37	37	0	0	
Thor-Burner	United States	Thor	1	1	0	0	
Thorad-Agena	United States	Thor	10	10	0	0	
Titan III	United States	Titan	8	7	0	1	
Tsyklon	Soviet Union	R-36	3	2	1	0	
Vostok	Soviet Union	R-7	3	2	1	0	

==== By configuration ====
Rocket	Country	Type	Launches	Successes	Failures	Partial failures	Remarks
Atlas-SLV3A Agena-D	United States	Atlas-Agena	1	1	0	0	
Atlas SLV-3C Centaur-D	United States	Atlas-Centaur	3	3	0	0	
Atlas F-OV1	United States	Atlas E/F	1	1	0	0	
Delta C1	United States	Delta	1	1	0	0	Last flight
Delta E1	United States	Delta	3	3	0	0	
Delta L	United States	Delta	1	0	1	0	First flight
Delta M	United States	Delta	4	3	1	0	
Delta N	United States	Delta	2	2	0	0	
Europa-1	Europe	Europa	1	0	1	0	
Kosmos-2I	Soviet Union	Kosmos-2	15	14	1	0	
Kosmos-3M	Soviet Union	Kosmos-3	7	6	1	0	
Lambda 4S	Japan	Lambda 4	1	0	1	0	
Molniya-M/Blok VL	Soviet Union	Molniya	2	2	0	0	Last flight
Molniya-M/Blok ML	Soviet Union	Molniya	2	2	0	0	
N1/L3	Soviet Union	N-1	2	0	2	0	First flight
Proton-K/D	Soviet Union	Proton	10	2	8	0	
R-36O	Soviet Union	R-36	1	1	0	0	
Saturn V	United States	Saturn V	4	4	0	0	
Scout B	United States	Scout	2	1	0	1	
Soyuz (11A511)	Soviet Union	Soyuz	5	5	0	0	
Thor-LV2F Burner-2	United States	Thor-Burner	1	1	0	0	
Thorad-SLV2G Agena-D	United States	Thorad-Agena	7	7	0	0	
Thorad-SLV2H Agena-D	United States	Thorad-Agena	3	3	0	0	First flight
Titan IIIB	United States	Titan III	6	5	0	1	
Titan IIIC	United States	Titan III	2	2	0	0	
Tsyklon-2	Soviet Union	Tsyklon	2	2	0	0	First flight
Tsyklon-2A	Soviet Union	Tsyklon	1	0	1	0	Last flight
Voskhod (11A57)	Soviet Union	Soyuz	32	32	0	0	
Vostok-2M	Soviet Union	Vostok	3	2	1	0	

=== By spaceport ===
Site	Country	Launches	Successes	Failures	Partial failures	Remarks
Baikonur	Soviet Union	38	27	11	0	
Cape Canaveral	United States	15	13	2	0	
Kapustin Yar	Soviet Union	3	3	0	0	
Kennedy	United States	4	4	0	0	
Plesetsk	Soviet Union	41	38	3	0	
Kagoshima	Japan	1	0	1	0	
Vandenberg	United States	22	20	0	2	
Woomera	Australia	1	0	1	0	

=== By orbit ===
Orbital regime	Launches	Achieved	Not Achieved	Accidentally Achieved	Remarks
Low Earth	85	81	3	1	
Geosynchronous / transfer	7	6	1	0	
Medium Earth	3	2	1	0	
High Earth	14	7	7	0	including highly elliptical and Molniya orbits and Trans Lunar trajectories
Heliocentric	7	4	3	0	

Preceded by 1968	Timeline of spaceflight 1969	Succeeded by 1970
