= Kosmos 275 =

Soviet radar calibration target satellite

- Mission type: ABM radar target
- COSPAR ID: 1969-031A
- SATCAT no.: 03846

Spacecraft properties
- Spacecraft type: DS-P1-I
- Manufacturer: Yuzhnoye
- Launch mass: 300 kilograms (660 lb)

Start of mission
- Launch date: 16:00, March 28, 1969 (UTC) UTC
- Rocket: Kosmos-2I 63SM
- Launch site: Plesetsk 133/1

End of mission
- Decay date: 7 February 1970

Orbital parameters
- Reference system: Geocentric
- Regime: Low Earth
- Perigee altitude: 273 kilometres (170 mi)
- Apogee altitude: 780 kilometres (480 mi)
- Inclination: 71 degrees
- Period: 95.2 minutes

Kosmos 275 (Russian: Космос 275 meaning Cosmos 275), also known as DS-P1-I No.5 was a satellite which was used as a radar target for anti-ballistic missile tests. It was launched by the Soviet Union in 1969 as part of the Dnepropetrovsk Sputnik programme.

It was launched aboard a Kosmos-2I 63SM rocket, from Site 133/1 at Plesetsk. The launch occurred at 16:00:08 UTC on 28 March 1969.

Kosmos 275 was placed into a low Earth orbit with a perigee of 273 kilometres (170 mi), an apogee of 780 kilometres (480 mi), 71 degrees of inclination, and an orbital period of 95.2 minutes. It decayed from orbit on 7 February 1970.

Kosmos 275 was the fifth of nineteen DS-P1-I satellites to be launched. Of these, all reached orbit successfully except the seventh.

== See also ==
- 1969 in spaceflight
