= Kosmos 314 =

Soviet radar calibration target satellite

- Mission type: ABM radar target
- COSPAR ID: 1969-106A
- SATCAT no.: 04266

Spacecraft properties
- Spacecraft type: DS-P1-Yu
- Manufacturer: Yuzhnoye
- Launch mass: 325 kilograms (717 lb)

Start of mission
- Launch date: 11 December 1969, 12:58:59 UTC
- Rocket: Kosmos-2I 63SM
- Launch site: Plesetsk 133/1

End of mission
- Decay date: 22 March 1970

Orbital parameters
- Reference system: Geocentric
- Regime: Low Earth
- Perigee altitude: 263 kilometres (163 mi)
- Apogee altitude: 426 kilometres (265 mi)
- Inclination: 71 degrees
- Period: 91.4 minutes

Kosmos 314 (Russian: Космос 314 meaning Cosmos 314), known before launch as DS-P1-Yu No.30, was a Soviet satellite which was launched in 1969 as part of the Dnepropetrovsk Sputnik programme. It was a 325-kilogram (717 lb) spacecraft, which was built by the Yuzhnoye Design Bureau, and was used as a radar calibration target for anti-ballistic missile tests.

== Launch ==
Kosmos 314 was launched from Site 133/1 at the Plesetsk Cosmodrome, atop a Kosmos-2I 63SM carrier rocket. The launch occurred on 11 December 1969 at 12:58:59 UTC, and resulted in the successful deployment of Kosmos 314 into low Earth orbit. Upon reaching orbit, it was assigned its Kosmos designation, and received the International Designator 1969-106A.

Kosmos 314 was operated in an orbit with a perigee of 263 kilometres (163 mi), an apogee of 426 kilometres (265 mi), 71 degrees of inclination, and an orbital period of 91.4 minutes. It remained in orbit until it decayed and reentered the atmosphere on 22 March 1970. It was the twenty-eighth of seventy nine DS-P1-Yu satellites to be launched, and the twenty-sixth of seventy two to successfully reach orbit.

== See also ==
- 1969 in spaceflight
