= Kosmos 308 =

Soviet radar calibration target satellite

- Mission type: ABM radar target
- COSPAR ID: 1969-096A
- SATCAT no.: 04219

Spacecraft properties
- Spacecraft type: DS-P1-I
- Manufacturer: Yuzhnoye
- Launch mass: 325 kilograms (717 lb)

Start of mission
- Launch date: 4 November 1969, 11:59:59 UTC
- Rocket: Kosmos-2I 63SM
- Launch site: Plesetsk 133/1

End of mission
- Decay date: 4 January 1970

Orbital parameters
- Reference system: Geocentric
- Regime: Low Earth
- Perigee altitude: 271 kilometres (168 mi)
- Apogee altitude: 408 kilometres (254 mi)
- Inclination: 71 degrees
- Period: 91.3 minutes

Kosmos 308 (Russian: Космос 308 meaning Cosmos 308), also known as DS-P1-I No.7 was a satellite which was used as a radar target for anti-ballistic missile tests. It was launched by the Soviet Union in 1969 as part of the Dnepropetrovsk Sputnik programme.

== Launch ==
It was launched aboard a Kosmos-2I 63SM rocket, from Site 133/1 at Plesetsk. The launch occurred at 11:59:59 UTC on 4 November 1969.

Kosmos 308 was placed into a low Earth orbit with a perigee of 271 kilometres (168 mi), an apogee of 408 kilometres (254 mi), 71 degrees of inclination, and an orbital period of 91.3 minutes. It decayed from orbit on 4 January 1970.

Kosmos 308 was the sixth of nineteen DS-P1-I satellites to be launched. Of these, all reached orbit successfully except the seventh.

== See also ==
- 1969 in spaceflight
