= Kosmos 283 =

Soviet radar calibration target satellite

- Mission type: ABM radar target
- COSPAR ID: 1969-047A
- SATCAT no.: 03957

Spacecraft properties
- Spacecraft type: DS-P1-Yu
- Manufacturer: Yuzhnoye
- Launch mass: 250 kilograms (550 lb)

Start of mission
- Launch date: 27 May 1969, 12:59:59 UTC
- Rocket: Kosmos-2I 63SM
- Launch site: Plesetsk 133/1

End of mission
- Decay date: 10 December 1969

Orbital parameters
- Reference system: Geocentric
- Regime: Low Earth
- Perigee altitude: 196 kilometres (122 mi)
- Apogee altitude: 1,364 kilometres (848 mi)
- Inclination: 81.9 degrees
- Period: 100.5 minutes

Kosmos 283 (Russian: Космос 283 meaning Cosmos 283), known before launch as DS-P1-Yu No.19, was a Soviet satellite which was used as a radar calibration target for tests of anti-ballistic missiles. It was a 250-kilogram (550 lb) spacecraft, which was built by the Yuzhnoye Design Bureau, and launched in 1969 as part of the Dnepropetrovsk Sputnik programme.

Kosmos 283 was launched from Site 133/1 at the Plesetsk Cosmodrome, atop a Kosmos-2I 63SM carrier rocket. The launch occurred on 27 May 1969 at 12:59:59 UTC, and resulted in Kosmos 283's successful deployment into low Earth orbit. Upon reaching orbit, it was assigned its Kosmos designation, and received the International Designator 1969-047A.

Kosmos 283 was operated in an orbit with a perigee of 196 kilometres (122 mi), an apogee of 1,364 kilometres (848 mi), 81.9 degrees of inclination, and an orbital period of 100.5 minutes. It remained in orbit until it decayed and reentered the atmosphere on 10 December 1969. It was the twenty-first of seventy nine DS-P1-Yu satellites to be launched, and the twentieth of seventy two to successfully reach orbit.

== See also ==
- 1969 in spaceflight
