= Kosmos 303 =

Soviet radar calibration target satellite

- Mission type: ABM radar target
- COSPAR ID: 1969-090A
- SATCAT no.: 04136

Spacecraft properties
- Spacecraft type: DS-P1-Yu
- Manufacturer: Yuzhnoye
- Launch mass: 325 kilograms (717 lb)

Start of mission
- Launch date: 18 October 1969, 10:00:03 UTC
- Rocket: Kosmos-2I 63SM
- Launch site: Plesetsk 133/1

End of mission
- Decay date: 23 January 1970

Orbital parameters
- Reference system: Geocentric
- Regime: Low Earth
- Perigee altitude: 259 kilometres (161 mi)
- Apogee altitude: 426 kilometres (265 mi)
- Inclination: 71 degrees
- Period: 91.4 minutes

Kosmos 303 (Russian: Космос 303 meaning Cosmos 303), known before launch as DS-P1-Yu No.28, was a Soviet satellite which was launched in 1969 as part of the Dnepropetrovsk Sputnik programme. It was a 325-kilogram (717 lb) spacecraft, which was built by the Yuzhnoye Design Bureau, and was used as a radar calibration target for anti-ballistic missile tests.

== Launch ==
Kosmos 303 was launched from Site 133/1 at the Plesetsk Cosmodrome, atop a Kosmos-2I 63SM carrier rocket. The launch occurred on 18 October 1969 at 10:00:03 UTC, and resulted in the successful deployment of Kosmos 303 into low Earth orbit. Upon reaching orbit, it was assigned its Kosmos designation, and received the International Designator 1969-090A.

Kosmos 303 was operated in an orbit with a perigee of 259 kilometres (161 mi), an apogee of 426 kilometres (265 mi), 71 degrees of inclination, and an orbital period of 91.4 minutes. It remained in orbit until it decayed and reentered the atmosphere on 23 January 1970. It was the twenty-fifth of seventy nine DS-P1-Yu satellites to be launched, and the twenty-third of seventy two to successfully reach orbit.

== See also ==
- 1969 in spaceflight
