= Kosmos 295 =

Soviet radar calibration target satellite

- Mission type: ABM radar target
- COSPAR ID: 1969-073A
- SATCAT no.: 04076

Spacecraft properties
- Spacecraft type: DS-P1-Yu
- Manufacturer: Yuzhnoye
- Launch mass: 325 kilograms (717 lb)

Start of mission
- Launch date: 22 August 1969, 14:14:57 UTC
- Rocket: Kosmos-2I 63SM
- Launch site: Plesetsk 133/1

End of mission
- Decay date: 1 December 1969

Orbital parameters
- Reference system: Geocentric
- Regime: Low Earth
- Perigee altitude: 262 kilometres (163 mi)
- Apogee altitude: 433 kilometres (269 mi)
- Inclination: 70.9 degrees
- Period: 91.5 minutes

Kosmos 295 (Russian: Космос 295 meaning Cosmos 295), known before launch as DS-P1-Yu No.29, was a Soviet satellite which was launched in 1969 as part of the Dnepropetrovsk Sputnik programme. It was a 325-kilogram (717 lb) spacecraft, which was built by the Yuzhnoye Design Bureau, and was used as a radar calibration target for anti-ballistic missile tests.

== Launch ==
Kosmos 295 was launched from Site 133/1 at the Plesetsk Cosmodrome, atop a Kosmos-2I 63SM carrier rocket. The launch occurred on 22 August 1969 at 14:14:57 UTC, and resulted in Kosmos 295's successful deployment into low Earth orbit. Upon reaching orbit, it was assigned its Kosmos designation, and received the International Designator 1969-073A.

Kosmos 295 was operated in an orbit with a perigee of 262 kilometres (163 mi), an apogee of 433 kilometres (269 mi), 70.9 degrees of inclination, and an orbital period of 91.5 minutes. It remained in orbit until it decayed and reentered the atmosphere on 1 December 1969. It was the twenty-fourth of seventy nine DS-P1-Yu satellites to be launched, and the twenty-second of seventy two to successfully reach orbit. Kosmos 295 replaced the previous DS-P1-Yu satellite, #23, which had failed to reach orbit due to a problem with the second stage of its carrier rocket.

== See also ==
- 1969 in spaceflight
