= Kosmos 265 =

Soviet satellite

- Mission type: ABM radar target
- COSPAR ID: 1969-012A
- SATCAT no.: 03675

Spacecraft properties
- Spacecraft type: DS-P1-Yu
- Manufacturer: Yuzhnoye
- Launch mass: 325 kg (717 lb)

Start of mission
- Launch date: 7 February 1969, 13:59 UTC
- Rocket: Kosmos-2I 63SM
- Launch site: Plesetsk 133/1

End of mission
- Decay date: 1 May 1969

Orbital parameters
- Reference system: Geocentric
- Regime: Low Earth
- Perigee altitude: 261 km (162 mi)
- Apogee altitude: 413 km (257 mi)
- Inclination: 70.9 degrees
- Period: 91.3 minutes

Kosmos 265 (Russian: Космос 265 meaning Cosmos 265), known before launch as DS-P1-Yu No.21, was a Soviet satellite which was used as a radar calibration target for tests of anti-ballistic missiles. It was built by the Yuzhnoye Design Bureau, and launched in 1969 as part of the Dnepropetrovsk Sputnik programme. It had a mass of 325 kg (717 lb).

Kosmos 265 was launched from Plesetsk Cosmodrome Site 133/1, atop a Kosmos-2I 63SM carrier rocket. The launch occurred on 7 February 1969 at 13:59 UTC, and resulted in Kosmos 265's successful deployment into low Earth orbit. Upon reaching orbit, it was assigned its Kosmos designation, and received the International Designator 1969-012A.

Kosmos 265 was operated in an orbit with a perigee of 261 kilometres (162 mi), an apogee of 413 kilometres (257 mi), 70.9 degrees of inclination, and an orbital period of 91.3 minutes. It remained in orbit until it decayed and reentered the atmosphere on 1 May 1969. It was the eighteenth of seventy nine DS-P1-Yu satellites to be launched, and the seventeenth of seventy two to successfully reach orbit.

== See also ==
- 1969 in spaceflight
