= Kosmos 285 =

Soviet radar calibration target satellite

- Mission type: ABM radar target
- COSPAR ID: 1969-049A
- SATCAT no.: 03983

Spacecraft properties
- Spacecraft type: DS-P1-Yu
- Manufacturer: Yuzhnoye
- Launch mass: 250 kilograms (550 lb)

Start of mission
- Launch date: 3 June 1969, 12:57:27 UTC
- Rocket: Kosmos-2I 63SM
- Launch site: Plesetsk 133/1

End of mission
- Decay date: 7 October 1969

Orbital parameters
- Reference system: Geocentric
- Regime: Low Earth
- Perigee altitude: 257 kilometres (160 mi)
- Apogee altitude: 452 kilometres (281 mi)
- Inclination: 71 degrees
- Period: 91.6 minutes

Kosmos 285 (Russian: Космос 285 meaning Cosmos 285), known before launch as DS-P1-Yu No.24, was a Soviet satellite which was used as a radar calibration target for tests of anti-ballistic missiles. It was a 250-kilogram (550 lb) spacecraft, which was built by the Yuzhnoye Design Bureau, and launched in 1969 as part of the Dnepropetrovsk Sputnik programme.

Kosmos 285 was launched from Site 133/1 at the Plesetsk Cosmodrome, atop a Kosmos-2I 63SM carrier rocket. The launch occurred on 3 June 1969 at 12:57:27 UTC, and resulted in Kosmos 285's successful deployment into low Earth orbit. Upon reaching orbit, it was assigned its Kosmos designation, and received the International Designator 1969-049A.

Kosmos 285 was operated in an orbit with a perigee of 257 kilometres (160 mi), an apogee of 452 kilometres (281 mi), 71 degrees of inclination, and an orbital period of 91.6 minutes. It remained in orbit until it decayed and reentered the atmosphere on 7 October 1969. It was the twenty-second of seventy nine DS-P1-Yu satellites to be launched, and the twenty-first of seventy two to successfully reach orbit.

== See also ==
- 1969 in spaceflight
