= Kosmos 277 =

Soviet radar calibration target satellite

- Mission type: ABM radar target
- COSPAR ID: 1969-033A
- SATCAT no.: 03855

Spacecraft properties
- Spacecraft type: DS-P1-Yu
- Manufacturer: Yuzhnoye
- Launch mass: 325 kilograms (717 lb)

Start of mission
- Launch date: 4 April 1969, 13:00:04 UTC
- Rocket: Kosmos-2I 63SM
- Launch site: Plesetsk 133/1

End of mission
- Decay date: 6 July 1969

Orbital parameters
- Reference system: Geocentric
- Regime: Low Earth
- Perigee altitude: 256 kilometres (159 mi)
- Apogee altitude: 412 kilometres (256 mi)
- Inclination: 70.9 degrees
- Period: 91.2 minutes

Kosmos 277 (Russian: Космос 277 meaning Cosmos 277), known before launch as DS-P1-Yu No.20, was a Soviet satellite which was used as a radar calibration target for tests of anti-ballistic missiles. It was a 325-kilogram (717 lb) spacecraft, which was built by the Yuzhnoye Design Bureau, and launched in 1969 as part of the Dnepropetrovsk Sputnik programme.

== Launch ==
Kosmos 277 was launched from Site 133/1 at the Plesetsk Cosmodrome, atop a Kosmos-2I 63SM carrier rocket. The launch occurred on 4 April 1969 at 13:00:04 UTC, and resulted in Kosmos 277's successful deployment into low Earth orbit. Upon reaching orbit, it was assigned its Kosmos designation, and received the International Designator 1969-033A.

Kosmos 277 was operated in an orbit with a perigee of 256 kilometres (159 mi), an apogee of 412 kilometres (256 mi), 70.9 degrees of inclination, and an orbital period of 91.2 minutes. It remained in orbit until it decayed and reentered the atmosphere on 6 July 1969. It was the twentieth of seventy nine DS-P1-Yu satellites to be launched, and the nineteenth of seventy two to successfully reach orbit.

== See also ==
- 1969 in spaceflight
