= Kosmos 268 =

Soviet radar calibration target satellite

- Mission type: ABM radar target
- COSPAR ID: 1969-020A
- SATCAT no.: 03773

Spacecraft properties
- Spacecraft type: DS-P1-Yu
- Manufacturer: Yuzhnoye
- Launch mass: 250 kilograms (550 lb)

Start of mission
- Launch date: 5 March 1969, 13:04:55 UTC
- Rocket: Kosmos-2I 63SM
- Launch site: Kapustin Yar 86/4

End of mission
- Decay date: 9 May 1970

Orbital parameters
- Reference system: Geocentric
- Regime: Low Earth
- Perigee altitude: 212 kilometres (132 mi)
- Apogee altitude: 2,063 kilometres (1,282 mi)
- Inclination: 48.4 degrees
- Period: 108 minutes

Kosmos 268 (Russian: Космос 268 meaning Cosmos 268), known before launch as DS-P1-Yu No.18, was a Soviet satellite which was used as a radar calibration target for tests of anti-ballistic missiles. It was a 250-kilogram (550 lb) spacecraft, which was built by the Yuzhnoye Design Bureau, and launched in 1969 as part of the Dnepropetrovsk Sputnik programme.

== Launch ==
Kosmos 268 was launched from Site 86/4 at Kapustin Yar, atop a Kosmos-2I 63SM carrier rocket. The launch occurred on 5 March 1969 at 13:04:55 UTC, and resulted in Kosmos 268's successful deployment into low Earth orbit. Upon reaching orbit, it was assigned its Kosmos designation, and received the International Designator 1969-020A.

Kosmos 268 was operated in an orbit with a perigee of 212 kilometres (132 mi), an apogee of 2,063 kilometres (1,282 mi), 48.4 degrees of inclination, and an orbital period of 108 minutes. It remained in orbit until it decayed and reentered the atmosphere on 9 May 1970. It was the nineteenth of seventy nine DS-P1-Yu satellites to be launched, and the eighteenth of seventy two to successfully reach orbit.

== See also ==
- 1969 in spaceflight
