= Kosmos 307 =

Soviet radar calibration target satellite

- Mission type: ABM radar target
- COSPAR ID: 1969-094A
- SATCAT no.: 04184

Spacecraft properties
- Spacecraft type: DS-P1-Yu
- Manufacturer: Yuzhnoye
- Launch mass: 250 kilograms (550 lb)

Start of mission
- Launch date: 24 October 1969, 13:01:58 UTC
- Rocket: Kosmos-2I 63SM
- Launch site: Kapustin Yar 86/4

End of mission
- Decay date: 30 December 1970

Orbital parameters
- Reference system: Geocentric
- Regime: Low Earth
- Perigee altitude: 212 kilometres (132 mi)
- Apogee altitude: 2,023 kilometres (1,257 mi)
- Inclination: 48.4 degrees
- Period: 107.7 minutes

Kosmos 307 (Russian: Космос 307 meaning Cosmos 307), known before launch as DS-P1-Yu No.22, was a Soviet satellite launched in 1969 as part of the Dnepropetrovsk Sputnik programme. It was a 250-kilogram (550 lb) spacecraft, which was built by the Yuzhnoye Design Bureau, and was used as a radar calibration target for anti-ballistic missile tests.

== Launch ==
Kosmos 307 was launched from Site 86/4 at Kapustin Yar, atop a Kosmos-2I 63SM carrier rocket. The launch occurred on 24 October 1969 at 13:01:58 UTC, and resulted in the successful deployment of Kosmos 307 into low Earth orbit. Upon reaching orbit, it was assigned its Kosmos designation, and received the International Designator 1969-094A.

Kosmos 307 was operated in an orbit with a perigee of 212 kilometres (132 mi), an apogee of 2,023 kilometres (1,257 mi), 48.4 degrees of inclination, and an orbital period of 107.7 minutes. It remained in orbit until it decayed and reentered the atmosphere on 30 December 1970. It was the twenty-sixth of seventy nine DS-P1-Yu satellites to be launched, and the twenty-fourth of seventy two to successfully reach orbit.

== See also ==
- 1969 in spaceflight
