= Kosmos 291 =

Soviet anti-satellite weapon target satellite

- Mission type: ASAT target
- COSPAR ID: 1969-066A
- SATCAT no.: 04058

Spacecraft properties
- Launch mass: 4,000 kilograms (8,800 lb)

Start of mission
- Launch date: 06 September 1969, 5:44:00 UTC
- Rocket: Tsyklon
- Launch site: Baikonur Cosmodrome

Kosmos 291 (Russian: Космос 291 meaning Cosmos 291), was a satellite was likely intended either as a dummy interceptor or as a target satellite for later ASAT interception tests. However, after reaching a low, somewhat eccentric orbit, it failed to perform the expected orbital maneuvers, and the mission is generally regarded as unsuccessful or incomplete.

== Launch ==
The launch on 6 August 1969 from the Baikonur Cosmodrome appears to have been the first test of the Tsyklon-2/11K69 booster. The launch occurred at 5:44:00 UTC on 6 September 1969. Shortly after launch, there was a booster failure which resulted in the loss of the spacecraft.

== See also ==
- 1969 in spaceflight
