= Deh Mandro =

Coordinates: 25.1932981°N 67.099744°E

Deh Mandro was Pakistan's first satellite earth station, located about 50km north of Karachi.

== History ==
It was established in 1972 and operated by Pakistan Telegraph & Telephone (PT&T). It provided a 24-hour direct telecommunication link through Intelsat III F-3.

Its foundation stone was laid by the then-President of Pakistan Yahya Khan on 28 June 1970. Its formal inauguration was carried out by then-Prime Minister Zulfiqar Ali Bhutto on 25 March 1974. In 1975, the International Telecommunications Satellite Organization (ITSO) gave Deh Mandro a No. 1 rating for its ability to broadcast 100% of the time. The station was responsible for overseas communication of telephone, telex services as well as for television. The station was directly connected with the US, Italy, the UK, China, Japan, Kuwait, Bahrain, and Hong Kong.

It was installed by Canadian Company RCA. It faced 60 degrees east Intelsat satellite. The first call was established between Canada and Lahore, on the afternoon on 16 December 1972. Before that different High Frequency wireless stations were in use, such as Pipri/Ghagar, K.T (Karachi-Transmitter)/MRC (Malir receiving Station), Talnor/Wani at Rawalpindi. Its first in-charge (Director) was S.M. Akhtarul Hassan). Communication system further enhanced through

- Pakistan-UAE Analogue Submarine Cable system (1177km/Analogue),
- SEA-ME-WE-3,
- SEA-ME-WE-4 (South East Asia-Middle East-Western Europe) systems.
