= Kosmos 148 =

Soviet radar calibration target satellite

- Mission type: ABM Radar target
- COSPAR ID: 1967-023A
- SATCAT no.: 02712
- Mission duration: 52 days

Spacecraft properties
- Spacecraft type: DS-P1-I
- Manufacturer: Yuzhnoye
- Launch mass: 325 kg

Start of mission
- Launch date: 16 March 1967, 17:30 GMT
- Rocket: Kosmos-2I 63SM
- Launch site: Plesetsk, 133/1
- Contractor: Yuzhnoye

End of mission
- Decay date: 7 May 1967

Orbital parameters
- Reference system: Geocentric
- Regime: Low Earth
- Perigee altitude: 270 km
- Apogee altitude: 404 km
- Inclination: 71.0°
- Period: 91.3 minutes
- Epoch: 16 March 1967

Kosmos 148 (Russian: Космос 148 meaning Cosmos 148), also known as DS-P1-I No.2 was a satellite which was used as a radar target for anti-ballistic missile tests. It was launched by the Soviet Union in 1967 as part of the Dnepropetrovsk Sputnik programme, and had a mass of 325 kilograms (717 lb).

It was launched aboard a Kosmos-2I 63SM rocket, from Site 133/1 at Plesetsk. The launch occurred at 17:30 GMT on 16 March 1967. This was the first DS-P1-I launch to use the Kosmos-2I 63SM, which replaced the earlier 63S1 model. It was also the first launch from Site 133 at the Plesetsk Cosmodrome.

Kosmos 148 was placed into a low Earth orbit with a perigee of 270 kilometres (170 mi), an apogee of 404 kilometres (251 mi), an inclination of 71.0°, and an orbital period of 91.3 minutes. It decayed from orbit on 7 May 1967.

Kosmos 148 was the second of nineteen DS-P1-I satellites to be launched. Of these, all reached orbit successfully except the DS-P1-I No.6 (seventh, launched out of sequence).

== See also ==
- 1967 in spaceflight
