= Intelsat III F-3 =

Geostationary communications satellite

- Mission type: Communications
- Operator: Intelsat
- COSPAR ID: 1969-011A
- SATCAT no.: 03674
- Mission duration: 5 years

Spacecraft properties
- Spacecraft type: Intelsat III
- Manufacturer: TRW
- Launch mass: 293 kg (646 lb)
- BOL mass: 151 kg (333 lb)
- Power: 183 watts

Start of mission
- Launch date: February 6, 1969, 00:39:00 UTC
- Rocket: Delta M
- Launch site: Cape Canaveral LC-17A
- Contractor: NASA

End of mission
- Disposal: Decommissioned
- Deactivated: c.December 14, 1979

Orbital parameters
- Reference system: Geocentric
- Regime: Geosynchronous; Now Graveyard
- Longitude: 174° east (1969); 63° east (1969-c.1975)
- Semi-major axis: 47,100 km (29,300 mi)
- Perigee altitude: 39,921 km (24,806 mi)
- Apogee altitude: 41,534 km (25,808 mi)
- Inclination: 18.33 degrees
- Period: 1695.49 minutes
- Epoch: January 23, 2015, 15:01:00 UTC

Intelsat III F-3 was a geostationary communications satellite operated by Intelsat. Launched in 1969 it was intended for operations over the Pacific Ocean; however, it spent most of its service life over the Indian Ocean at a longitude of 63 degrees east.

The third of eight Intelsat III satellites to be launched, Intelsat III F-3 was built by TRW. It was a 293-kilogram (646 lb) spacecraft, with its mass reducing to 151 kilograms (333 lb) by entry into service as it burned propellant to reach its final orbit. The satellite carried an SVM-2 apogee motor for propulsion and was equipped with two transponders powered by body-mounted solar cells generating 183 watts of power. It was designed for 5 years of service life.

The launch of Intelsat III F-3 made use of a Delta M rocket flying from Launch Complex 17A at the Cape Canaveral Air Force Station. The launch, which was conducted by NASA, took place at 00:39:00 UTC on February 6, 1969, with the spacecraft entering a geosynchronous transfer orbit. Shortly after launch, Intelsat III F-3 fired its apogee motor to achieve geostationary orbit.

Intended to be operated over the Pacific Ocean at a longitude of 174° east, Intelsat III F-3 was moved to the less important Indian Ocean slot at 63° east after only three months in orbit due to concerns regarding its reliability. The satellite was only regarded as partially operable; however, it remained in service until April 1979, before being decommissioned in December of that year.

At the end of its service life, Intelsat III F-3 was raised into a higher orbit to reduce the probability of it colliding with an operational spacecraft. As of February 3, 2014 it remains in orbit, with a perigee of 39,935 kilometers (24,814 mi), an apogee of 41,521 kilometers (25,800 mi), inclination of 18.63 degrees and an orbital period of 28.25 hours.

== See also ==
- Deh Mandro
