= Sandhawk =

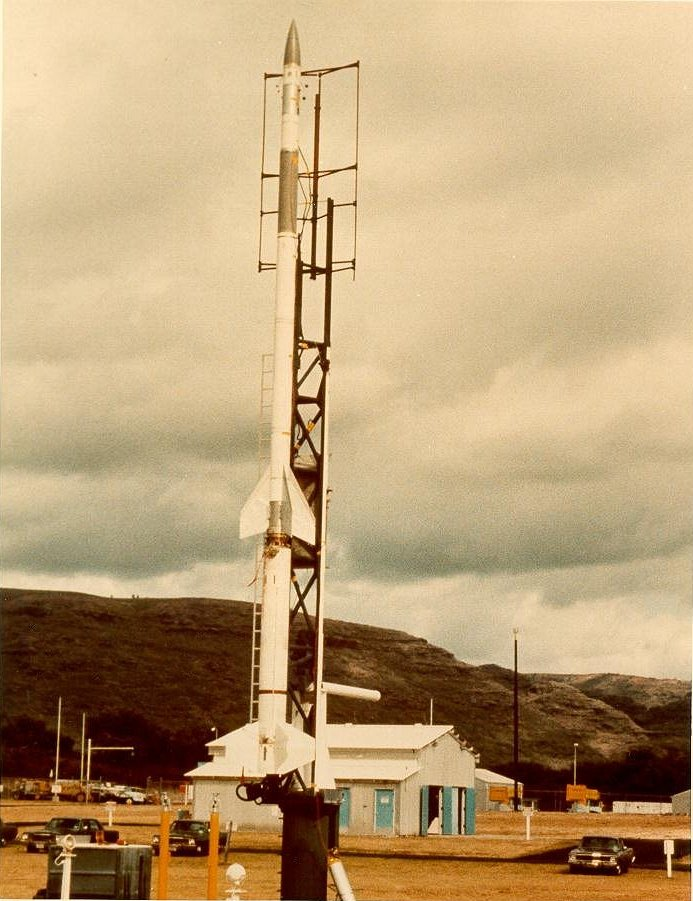
Terrier-Sandhawk prepared for launch with X-ray experiment payload, Kauai Test Facility

The Sandhawk was a sounding rocket developed by Sandia National Laboratories in 1966. This single-stage, sub-orbital rocket had a mass of 700 kg (1,540 lb), a takeoff thrust of 80 kN (18,000 lbf), and could reach heights of around 200 km. Sandia launched eight of these rockets between 1966 and 1974 as part of experiments conducted for the United States Atomic Energy Commission. About 25% of the launches failed.

The Sandhawk was also used as the second stage of other sounding rockets, such as Terrier-Sandhawk, launched 30 times, and as the first stage of Dualhawk, with TE-416 Tomahawk as the second stage.
