= Intelsat III F-4 =

Geostationary communications satellite

- Mission type: Communications
- Operator: Intelsat
- COSPAR ID: 1969-045A
- SATCAT no.: 03947
- Mission duration: 5 years design life

Spacecraft properties
- Manufacturer: TRW
- Launch mass: 647 kilograms (1,426 lb)
- BOL mass: 151 kilograms (333 lb)
- Dry mass: 293 kilograms (646 lb)

Start of mission
- Launch date: 22 May 1969, 02:00 UTC
- Rocket: Delta M
- Launch site: Cape Canaveral LC-17A
- Contractor: NASA

End of mission
- Disposal: Decommissioned

Orbital parameters
- Reference system: Geocentric
- Regime: Geostationary
- Eccentricity: 0.00471
- Perigee altitude: 35,276 kilometres (21,919 mi)
- Apogee altitude: 35,670 kilometres (22,160 mi)
- Inclination: 0.5 degrees
- Period: 1,418.9 minutes
- Epoch: 22 May 1969

Intelsat III F-4 was a geostationary communications satellite above the Pacific. It was built by TRW and owned by Intelsat, a company currently based in Luxembourg. The satellite had an estimated useful life of 5 years.

The Intelsat III F-4 was part of the Intelsat III series which consisted of eight satellites, which were used for retransmission of global commercial telecommunications, including live TV.

The satellite was stabilized by rotation, with an unspun antenna structure. The antenna was 34 inches high. It had a hydrazine propulsion system with four thrusters and four tanks, and passive thermal control. The solar cells produced 178W peak, charging a set of 9Ah NiCd batteries. The load consisted of two transponders that used 12 watt TWTA amplifiers for multiple access, 1500 audio circuits or four TV channels.

The satellite was successfully launched into space on May 22, 1969, by means of a Delta M vehicle from Cape Canaveral Air Force Station in Florida, United States. It had a launch mass of 293 kg.
