= Delta L =

American expendable launch vehicle

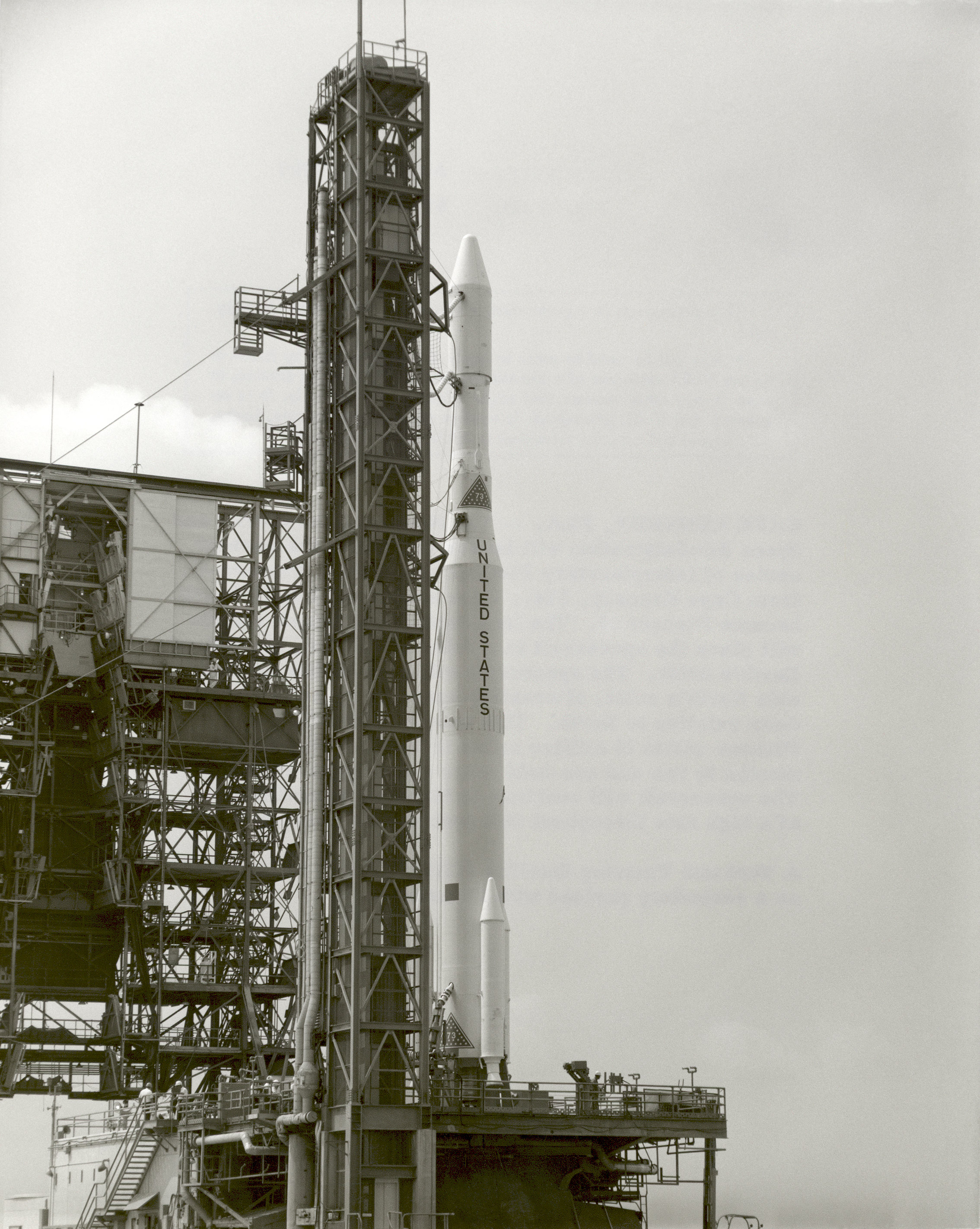
- Delta L before the failed attempt to launch Pioneer E
- Function: Expendable launch system
- Country of origin: United States

Size
- Stages: Castor 2 (3); Long Tank Thor; Delta E; FW-4D

Launch history
- Status: Retired
- Launch sites: Cape Canaveral LC-17A; Vandenberg SLC-2E
- Total launches: 2
- Success(es): 1
- Failure: 1
- First flight: 27 August 1969
- Last flight: 31 January 1972

The Delta L, Thor-Delta L, or Thrust-Augmented Long Tank Thor-Delta was an American expendable launch system used to launch the unsuccessful Pioneer E and TETR satellites in 1969, as well as the HEOS satellite in 1972. It was a member of the Delta family of rockets.

The Delta L was a three-stage rocket. The first stage was a Long Tank Thor, a stretched version of the Thor missile, augmented by three Castor-2 solid rocket boosters. The second stage was the Delta E. An FW-4D solid rocket motor was used as the third stage.

The first launch of the Delta L took place on 27 August 1969, from Launch Complex 17A at the Cape Canaveral Air Force Station. A defective valve caused plumbing in the hydraulics system to rupture and leak fluid, causing first-stage engine gimbaling to fail around 2 1/2 minutes into launch. The stage completed its burn successfully, but threw the second stage far off course. Orbital velocity could not be achieved, and Range Safety sent the destruct command at T+383 seconds. Neither the Pioneer E nor the TETR payloads achieved orbit. The second and final Delta L launch was from Space Launch Complex 2E at the Vandenberg Air Force Base, on 31 January 1972. It successfully placed the HEOS-2 satellite into a highly elliptical orbit.
