= Pioneer 6, 7, 8, and 9 =

Space probes launched from 1965 to 1969

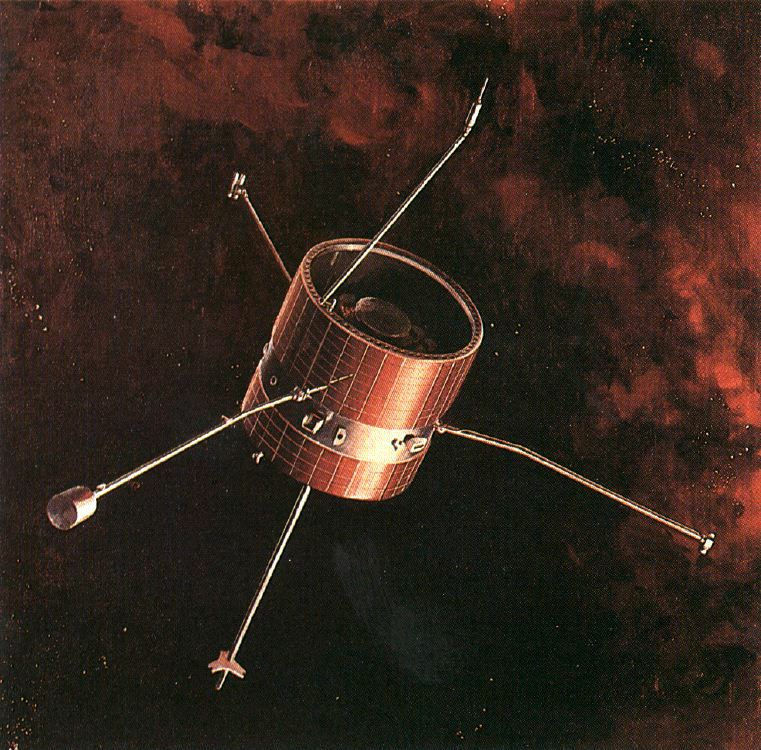
- Artist's conception of the Pioneer 6–9 spacecraft.
- Mission type: Interplanetary space
- Operator: NASA
- COSPAR ID: Pioneer 6: 1965-105A; Pioneer 7: 1966-075A; Pioneer 8: 1967-123A; Pioneer 9: 1968-100A
- SATCAT no.: Pioneer 6: 1841; Pioneer 7: 2398; Pioneer 8: 3066; Pioneer 9: 3533
- Mission duration: Pioneer 6: 34 years, 11 months and 22 days; Pioneer 7: 28 years, 7 months and 14 days; Pioneer 8: 28 years, 8 months and 9 days; Pioneer 9: 14 years, 6 months and 11 days

Spacecraft properties
- Manufacturer: TRW
- Launch mass: Pioneer 6: 62.14 kg; Pioneer 7: 62.75 kg; Pioneer 8 and 9: 65.36 kg
- Power: 79 W

Start of mission
- Launch date: Pioneer 6: 16 December 1965, 07:31:21 UTC; Pioneer 7: 17 August 1966, 15:20:17 UTC; Pioneer 8: 13 December 1967, 14:08 UTC; Pioneer 9: 8 November 1968, 09:46:29 UTC; Pioneer E: 27 August 1969, 21:59:00 UTC
- Rocket: Pioneer 6–9: Delta E; Pioneer E: Delta L
- Launch site: Pioneer 6, 7, and E: Cape Canaveral, LC-17A; Pioneer 8 and 9: Cape Canaveral, LC-17B

End of mission
- Last contact: Pioneer 6: 8 December 2000; Pioneer 7: 31 March 1995; Pioneer 8: 22 August 1996; Pioneer 9: 19 May 1983

Orbital parameters
- Reference system: Heliocentric
- Perihelion altitude: between 0.75 and 1 AU
- Aphelion altitude: between 0.99 and 1.2 AU

Pioneer 6, 7, 8, and 9 were space probes in the Pioneer program, launched between 1965 and 1969. They were a series of solar-orbiting, spin-stabilized, solar cell- and battery-powered satellites designed to obtain measurements on a continuing basis of interplanetary phenomena from widely separated points in space. They were also known as Pioneer A, B, C, and D. The fifth (Pioneer E) was lost in a launch accident, and therefore did not receive a numerical designation.

== Purpose ==
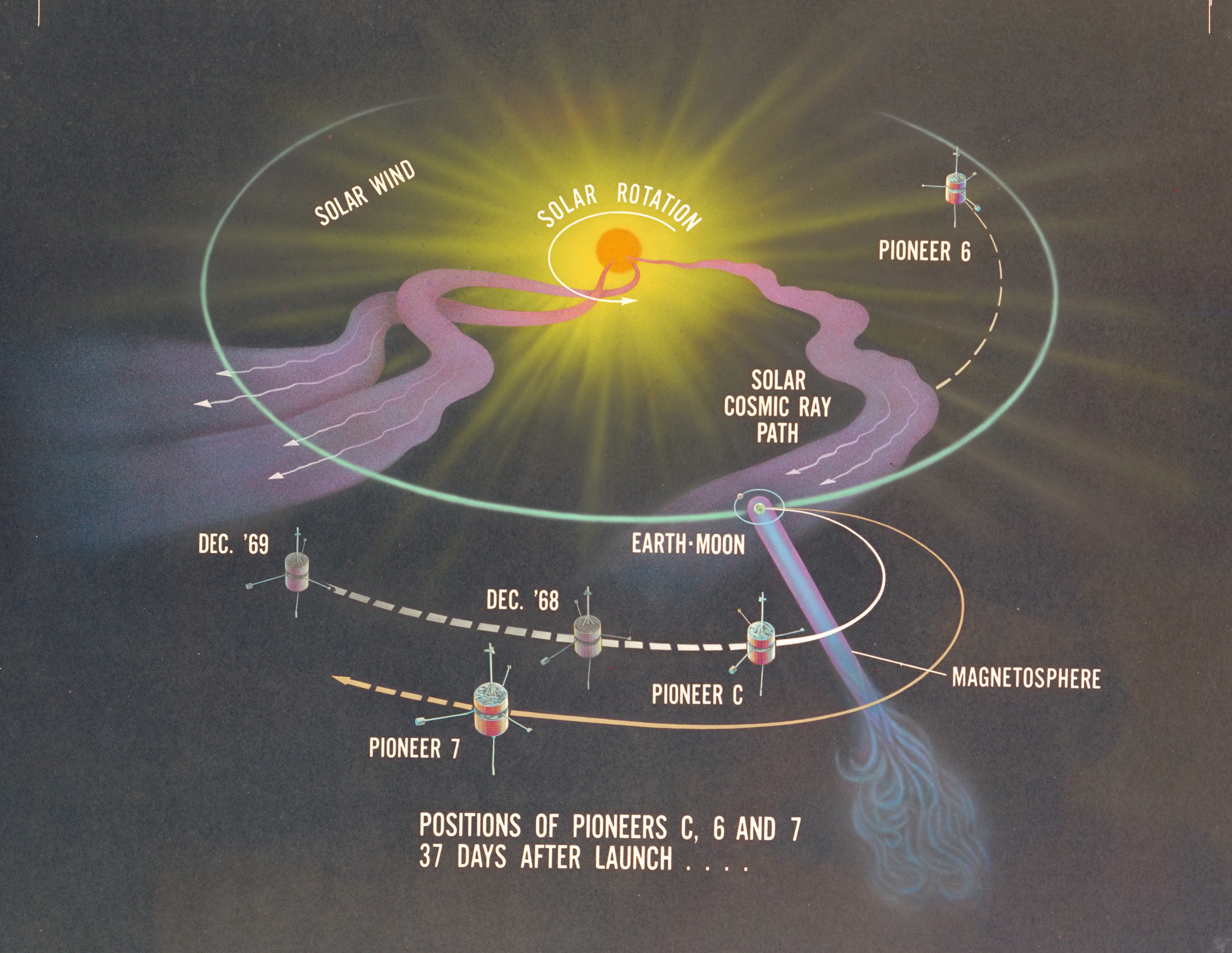
Positions of Pioneer 6, 7 and 8

Pioneers 6, 7, 8, and 9 were created to make the first detailed, comprehensive measurements of the solar wind, solar magnetic field and cosmic rays. They were designed to measure large scale magnetic phenomena and particles and fields in interplanetary space. Data from the vehicles have been used to better understand stellar processes and the structure and flow of the solar wind. The vehicles also acted as the world's first space-based solar weather network, providing practical data on solar storms which affect communications and power on Earth.

The experiments studied the positive ions (cations) and electrons in the solar wind, the interplanetary electron density (radio propagation experiment), solar and galactic cosmic rays, and the Interplanetary Magnetic Field.

The spacecraft were important collectors of heliophysics and space weather data. In conjunction with other spacecraft these, for the first time, enabled spaceborne observations to be combined with terrestrial observations on the ground and from sounding balloons. In early August 1972 Pioneer 9 recorded significant observations of one of the most potent solar storms ever recorded, and the most hazardous to human spaceflight during the Space Age.

== Vehicle description ==
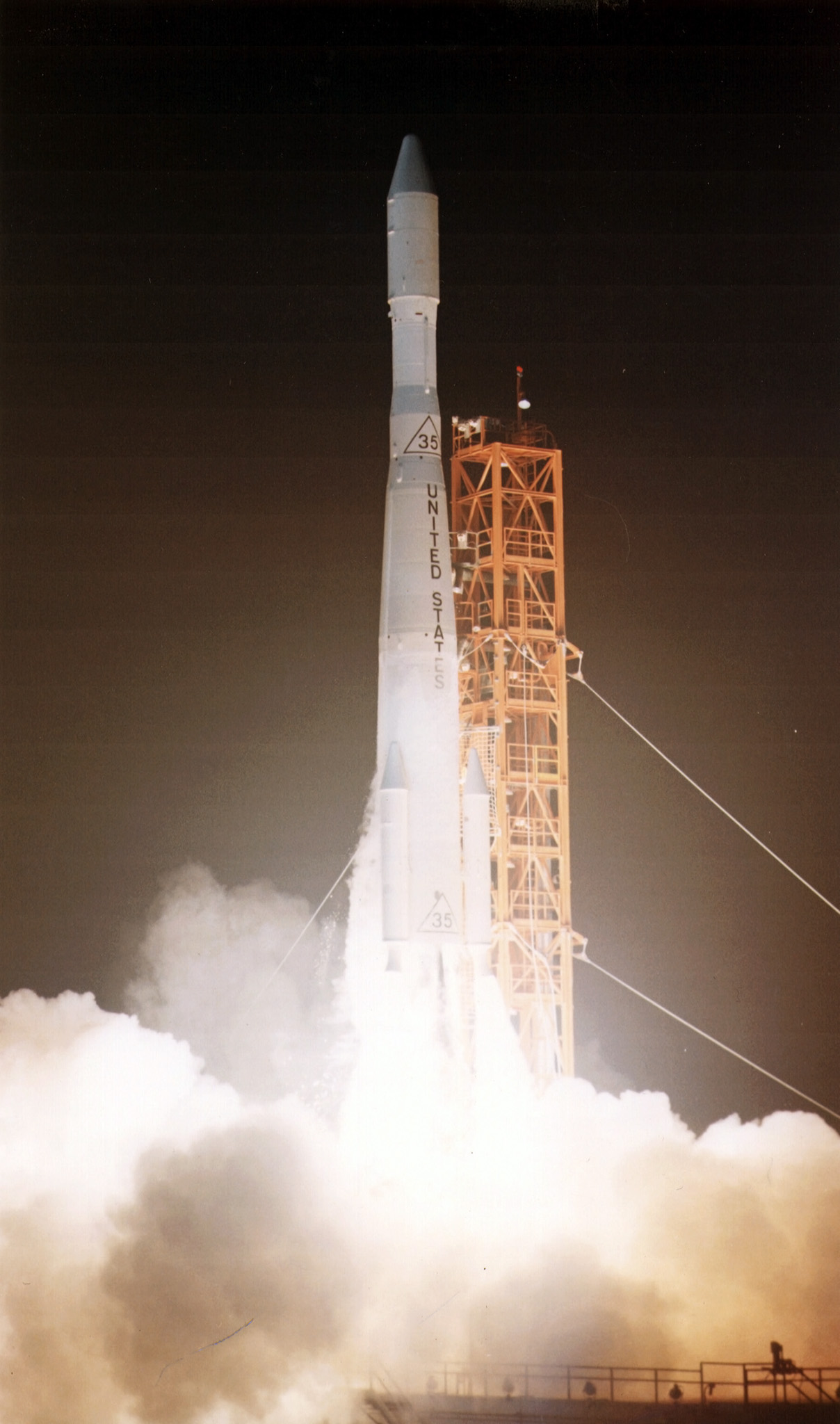
Launch of Pioneer 6 on a Delta-E rocket

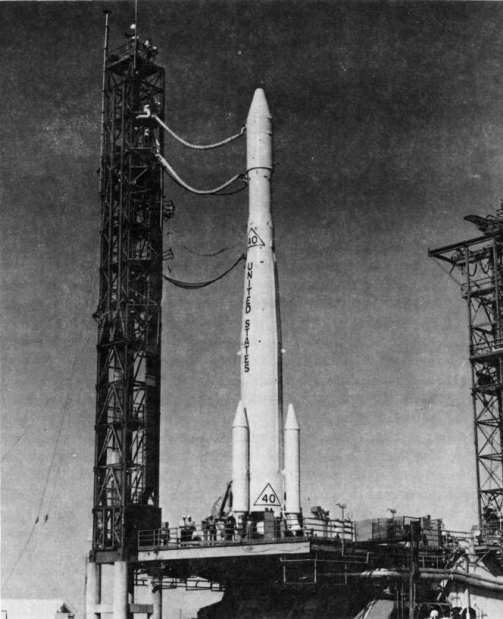
The Pioneer-7 launch from Complex 17A

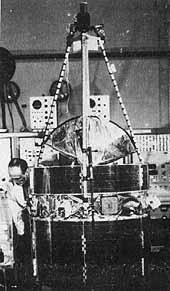
Pioneer 8 being prepared for launch

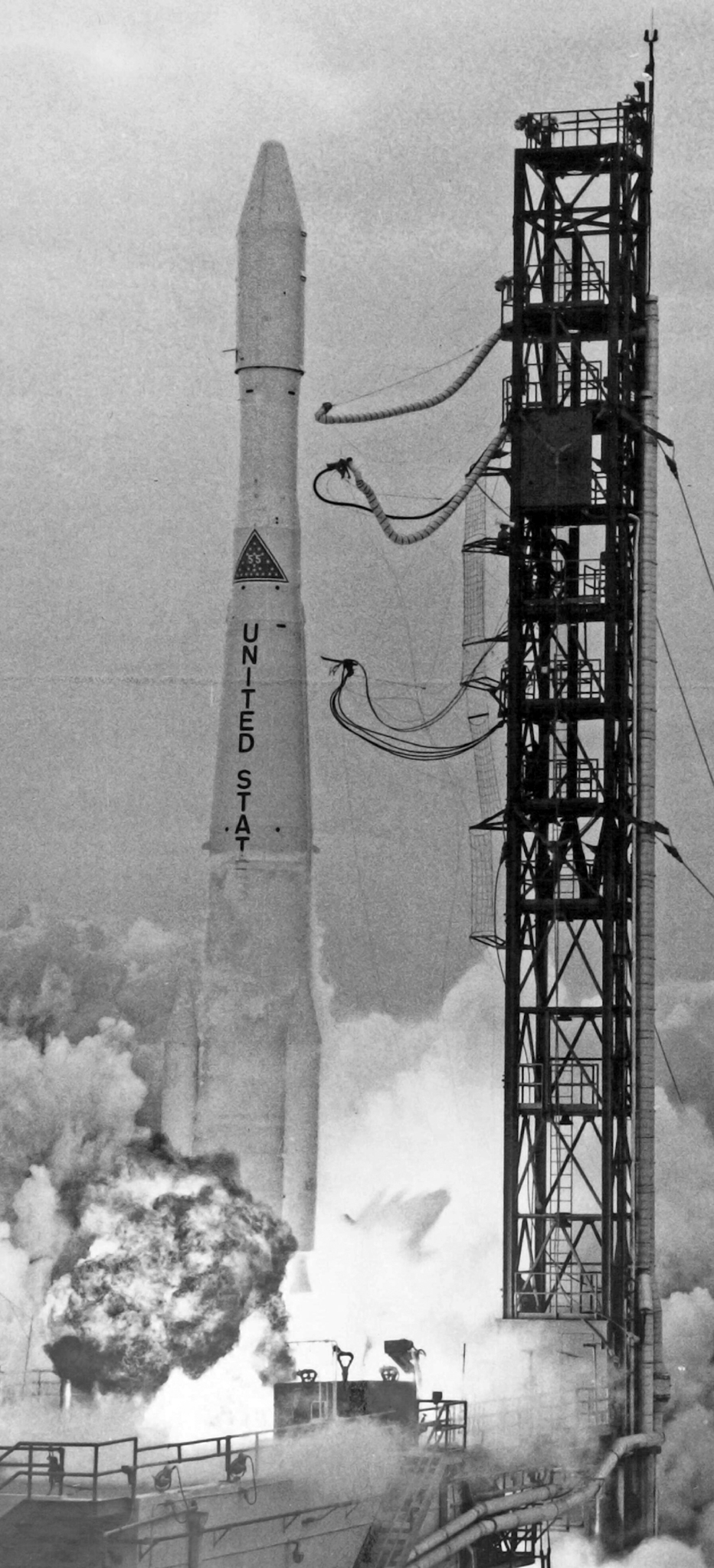
Launch of Pioneer 8 on a Delta-E1 rocket

Each craft was identical. They were spin-stabilized 0.94 m (3 ft 1 in) diameter × 0.81 m (2 ft 8 in) tall cylinders with a 1.8 m (5 ft 11 in) long magnetometer boom and solar panels mounted around the body.

The main antenna was a high-gain directional antenna. The spacecraft were spin-stabilized at about 60 RPM, and the spin axis was perpendicular to the ecliptic plane and pointed toward the south ecliptic pole.

Instruments differed somewhat between spacecraft, with some being used in all four missions:

Instrument	Pioneer			
Instrument	6	7	8	9
Solar Wind Plasma Faraday Cup	✔	✔		
Cosmic-Ray Telescope	✔	✔		
Electrostatic Analyzer	✔	✔	✔	
Superior Conjunction Faraday Rotation	✔	✔		
Spectral Broadening	✔			
Relativity Investigation	✔			
Uniaxial Fluxgate Magnetometer	✔			
Cosmic-Ray Anisotropy	✔	✔	✔	✔
Celestial Mechanics	✔	✔	✔	✔
Two-Frequency Beacon Receiver	✔	✔	✔	✔
Single-Axis Magnetometer		✔	✔	
Cosmic Dust Detector			✔	✔
Cosmic Ray Gradient Detector			✔	✔
Plasma Wave Detector			✔	
Triaxial Magnetometer				✔
Solar Plasma Detector				✔
Electric Field Detector				✔

== Communications ==
By ground command, one of five bit rates, one of four data formats, and one of four operating modes could be selected. The five-bit rates were 512, 256, 64, 16, and 8 bit/s. Three of the four data formats contained primarily scientific data and consisted of 32 seven-bit words per frame. One scientific data format was for use at the two highest bit rates. Another was for use at the three lowest bit rates. The third contained data from only the radio propagation experiment. The fourth data format contained mainly engineering data.

The four operating modes were: real-time, telemetry store, duty cycle store, and memory readout. In the real-time mode, data were sampled and transmitted directly (without storage) as specified by the data format and bit rate selected. In the telemetry store mode, data were stored and transmitted simultaneously in the format and at the bit rate selected. In the duty-cycle store mode, a single frame of scientific data was collected and stored at a rate of 512 bit/s. The time interval between the collection and storage of successive frames could be varied by ground command between 2 and 17 min to provide partial data coverage for periods up to 19 hours, as limited by the bit storage capacity. In the memory readout mode, data was read out at whatever bit rate was appropriate to the satellite distance from Earth.

== Timeline and current status ==
As stated by JPL, "The Pioneer 6–9 program has been touted as one of the least expensive of all NASA spacecraft programs in terms of scientific results per dollar spent." Although the four spacecraft have not been regularly tracked for science data return in recent years, a successful telemetry contact with Pioneer 6 was made on December 8, 2000, to celebrate 35 years of continuous operation since launch. Its original design life expectancy was only 6 months.

Although NASA described Pioneer 6 as "extant" as of 26 March 2007, there has been no contact since December 8, 2000. At this time Pioneer 6 had operated for 12,758 days, making it the oldest operating space probe until it was surpassed by Voyager 2 on August 13, 2012. It is also believed that contact is still possible with Pioneer 7 and 8; only Pioneer 9 is definitely not working.

=== Pioneer 6 ===
- December 16, 1965 Launched at 07:31:00 UTC from Cape Canaveral to a circular solar orbit with a mean distance of 0.8 AU.
- December 1995 The prime Traveling-wave tube (TWT) failed sometime after December 1995.
- July 1996 Spacecraft commanded to the backup TWT.
- October 6, 1997 Tracked with the 70 meter Deep Space Station 43 in Australia. The MIT and ARC Plasma Analyzers, as well as the cosmic ray detector from the University of Chicago, were turned on and working.
- December 8, 2000 Successful telemetry contact for about two hours.

=== Pioneer 7 ===
- August 17, 1966 Launched from Cape Canaveral into solar orbit with a mean distance of 1.1 AU.
- March 20, 1986 Flew within 12.3 million kilometers of Halley's Comet and monitored the interaction between the cometary hydrogen tail and the solar wind. It discovered He+ plasma produced by charge exchange of solar wind He++ with neutral cometary material.
- March 31, 1995 Tracked successfully. The spacecraft and one of the science instruments were still functioning.

=== Pioneer 8 ===
- December 13, 1967: Launched at 14:08:00 UTC from Cape Canaveral into solar orbit with a mean distance of 1.1 AU from the Sun.
- August 22, 1996: The spacecraft commanded to switch to the backup TWT. Downlink signal was re-acquired, one of the science instruments again functioning.

=== Pioneer 9 ===
- November 8, 1968: Launched at 09:46:00 UTC from Cape Canaveral into solar orbit with a mean distance of 0.8 AU.
- 1983: Final contact.
- 1987: Contact was attempted, but failed.

=== Pioneer E ===
- August 27, 1969: Launched at 21:59:00 UTC from Cape Canaveral. The launch vehicle was destroyed by range safety after hydraulics in the first stage failed.

== See also ==
- 17776, a speculative fiction work featuring a sentient Pioneer 9
