= Plesetsk Cosmodrome Site 133 =

Site 133 (Raduga)
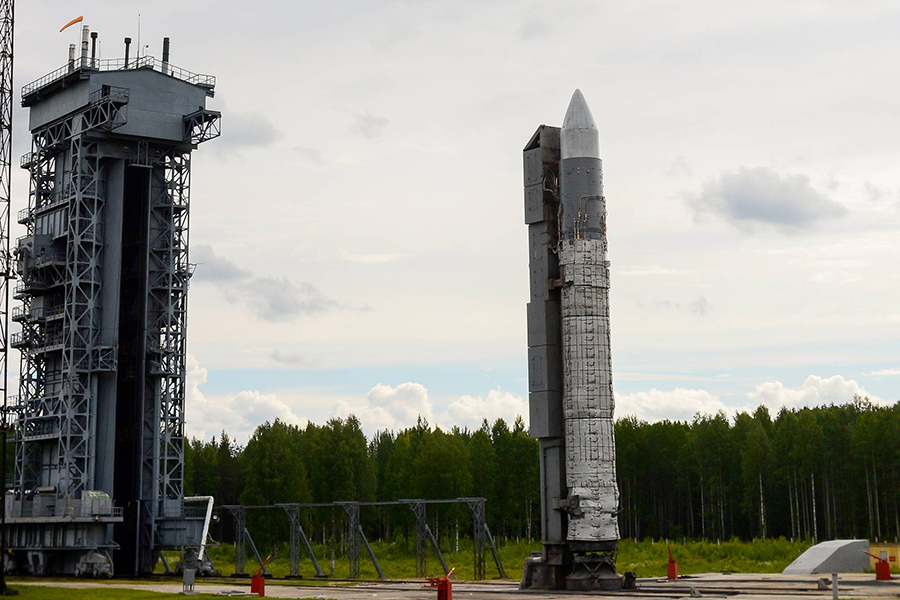
- Rokot launch vehicle being prepared for flight at Site 133, July 2014
- Launch site: Plesetsk Cosmodrome
- Location: 62°53′17″N 40°50′57″E
- Short name: Pu-133
- Operator: Russian Space Forces
- Launch pad(s): One
Launch history
- Status: Retired
- Launches: 161
- First launch: 16 March 1967; Kosmos-2I (Kosmos 148)
- Last launch: 26 December 2019; Rokot (Gonets-M 14-15-16)
- Associated rockets: Future: Rokot-M; Retired: Kosmos-2I, Kosmos-3M, Rokot

Site 133, also known as Raduga (Russian: Радуга meaning Rainbow), is a launch complex at the Plesetsk Cosmodrome in Russia. It is used by Rockot, and previously Kosmos carrier rockets. It consists of a single pad, originally designated 133/1, and later 133/3.

The first launch from Site 133 was of a Kosmos-2I, on 16 March 1967, carrying the Kosmos 148 satellite. 91 Kosmos-2 launches were conducted, the last of which was on 18 June 1977, with Kosmos 919. It was later reactivated as Site 133/3, and supported 38 Kosmos-3M launches between 1985 and 1994.

During the late 1990s, Site 133/3 was rebuilt as a surface launch pad for Rockot, following the decision to use it for commercial launches. There were concerns that noise generated during a launch from Site 175 at the Baikonur Cosmodrome, a silo-based complex, could cause vibrations that would damage the payload.

Rockots are wheeled up to the complex in a vertical position, and then the service tower is rolled around it. The payload is lifted by a crane and placed on top of the rocket. The procedure is in contrast to many other Russian and Soviet rockets, which had traditionally been assembled horizontally and then transferred to the launch site via railways. The first Rockot launch from Site 133 took place on 16 May 2000, orbiting the SimSat-1 DemoSat. The last Rokot flight took place 26 December 2019, from Site 133. 31 Rockots in total were launched from the site.
