= List of primary Interstate Highways =

Dwight D. Eisenhower National System of Interstate and Defense Highways
- Highway shield for Interstate 90 and the Eisenhower Interstate System
- Primary Interstate Highways in the 48 contiguous states as of 2024

System information
- Formed: June 29, 1956

Highway names
- Interstates: Interstate X (I-X)

System links
- Interstate Highway System; Main; Auxiliary; Suffixed; Business; Future

There are 72 primary Interstate Highways in the Interstate Highway System, a network of freeways in the United States. These primary highways are assigned one- or two-digit route numbers. Their associated auxiliary Interstate Highways receive three-digit route numbers. Typically, even-numbered Interstates run east–west, with lower numbers in the south and higher numbers in the north. Odd-numbered Interstates run north–south, with lower numbers in the west and higher numbers in the east.

Route numbers divisible by 5 usually represent major coast-to-coast or border-to-border routes, for example, I-10 connects Santa Monica, California to Jacksonville, Florida, extending between the Pacific and Atlantic oceans. Auxiliary highways have an added digit prefixing the number of the parent highway.

Six route numbers are duplicated in the system. The corresponding highways are in different regions, reducing potential confusion. In addition to primary highways in the contiguous United States, there are signed Interstates in Hawaii and unsigned Interstates in Alaska and Puerto Rico.

== Contiguous United States ==
There are 72 primary interstate highways in the 48 contiguous United States, and five former primary interstate highways. This number does not include auxiliary Interstate Highways.

Number	Length (mi)	Length (km)	Southern or western terminus	Northern or eastern terminus	Formed	Removed	Notes
I-2	46.80	75.32	US 83/Bus. US 83-S in La Joya, TX	I-69E/US 77/US 83 in Harlingen, TX	2013	current	Unfinished in Texas; Texas only
I-4	132.30	212.92	I-275 in Tampa, FL	I-95/SR 400 at Daytona Beach, FL	1957	current	Florida only
I-5	1,381.29	2,222.97	Fed. 1/Fed. 1D at San Diego, CA	Highway 99 at Blaine, WA	1957	current	Serves three states: California, Oregon, Washington; Associated routes: I-105, I-205, I-305, I-405, I-505, I-605, I-705, I-805; Planned: I-905 in California
I-8	350.34	563.82	Sunset Cliffs Boulevard & Nimitz Boulevard in San Diego, CA	I-10 in Casa Grande, AZ	1964	current	Serves two states: California, Arizona
I-10	2,460.34	3,959.53	SR 1 in Santa Monica, CA	I-95/US 17 in Jacksonville, FL	1957	current	Serves eight states: California, Arizona, New Mexico, Texas, Louisiana, Mississippi, Alabama, Florida; Associated routes: I-110, I-210, I-310, I-410, I-510, I-610, I-710, I-910
I-11	54.193	87.215	US 93 at the Arizona state line	Future I-11/US 95/SR 157 in Las Vegas, NV	2017	current	Unfinished in Nevada; Nevada only; planned in one more: Arizona
I-12	85.59	137.74	I-10 in Baton Rouge, LA	I-10/I-59 in Slidell, LA	1967	current	Louisiana only
I-14	25.10	40.39	US 190 & US 190 Bus. in Copperas Cove, TX	I-35/US 190 in Belton, TX	2017	current	Unfinished in Texas; Texas only; planned in four more: Louisiana, Mississippi, Alabama, Georgia; Planned associated routes: I-14N, I-14S, and I-214 in Texas
I-15	1,433.52	2,307.03	I-8 & SR 15 in San Diego, CA	Highway 4 at Sweetgrass, MT	1957	current	Unfinished in California; serves six states: California, Nevada, Arizona, Utah, Idaho, Montana; Associated routes: I-115, I-215, I-315
I-16	166.81	268.45	I-75/SR 540 in Macon, GA	Montgomery Street in Savannah, GA	1966	current	Georgia only Associated route: I-516
I-17	145.93	234.85	I-10/US 60 in Phoenix, AZ	I-40/SR 89A in Flagstaff, AZ	1961	current	Arizona only
I-19	63.43	102.08	I-19 BL in Nogales, AZ	I-10 in Tucson, AZ	1972	current	Arizona only Uses kilometers instead of miles
I-20	1,539.38	2,477.39	I-10 in Reeves County, TX	I-95 & I-20 Bus. in Florence, SC	1957	current	Serves six states: Texas, Louisiana, Mississippi, Alabama, Georgia, South Carolina; Associated routes: I-220, I-520, I-820
I-22	202.22	325.44	I-269/US 78/MS 304 in Byhalia, MS	I-65 in Birmingham, AL	2012	current	Unfinished in Alabama; serves two states: Mississippi, Alabama; Planned associated routes: I-222 and I-422 in Alabama
I-24	316.36	509.13	I-57 in Pulley's Mill, IL	I-75/US 74 in East Ridge, TN	1962	current	Serves four states: Illinois, Kentucky, Tennessee, Georgia; Associated route: I-124
I-25	1,061.67	1,708.59	I-10/US 85/US 180 in Las Cruces, NM	I-90/US 87 in Buffalo, WY	1957	current	Serves three states: New Mexico, Colorado, Wyoming; Associated route: I-225
I-26	328.09	528.01	US 11W/US 23 in Kingsport, TN I-40/I-240/US 74 in Asheville, NC	US 19/US 23 south of Forks of Ivy, NC US 17 in Charleston, SC	1960	current	Unfinished in North Carolina; serves three states: Tennessee, North Carolina, South Carolina; Associated routes: I-126, I-526
I-27	128.332	206.530	US 87 in Lubbock, TX	I-40/US 60/US 87/US 287 in Amarillo, TX	1969	current	Unfinished in Texas; Texas only; planned in one more: New Mexico; Planned associated routes in Texas: I-27E, I-27W, I-27N
I-29	750.58	1,207.94	I-35/I-70/US 24/US 40/US 71 in Kansas City, MO	PTH 75 at Pembina, ND	1957	current	Serves four states: Missouri, Iowa, South Dakota, North Dakota; Associated routes: I-129, I-229
I-30	366.76	590.24	I-20 northeast of Aledo, TX	I-40/US 65/US 67/US 167/AR 107 in North Little Rock, AR	1957	current	Serves two states: Texas, Arkansas; Associated routes: I-430, I-530, I-630
I-31	—	—	I-94 in Fargo, ND	US 81 & PTH 75 at Pembina, ND	1957	1958	Served North Dakota only Replaced by a northward extension of I-29
I-35	1,569.06	2,525.16	US 83 in Laredo, TX I-35W & I-35E in Denton, TX I-35W & I-35E in Columbus, MN	I-35W & I-35E in Hillsboro, TX I-35W & I-35E in Burnsville, MN MN 61 in Duluth, MN	1956	current	Serves six states: Texas, Oklahoma, Kansas, Missouri, Iowa, Minnesota; Associated routes: I-35E, I-35W, I-135, I-235, I-335, I-435, I-535, I-635
I-37	143.00	230.14	US 181/SH 35 in Corpus Christi, TX	I-35/US 281 in San Antonio, TX	1959	current	Texas only
I-39	306.14	492.68	I-55/US 51 in Normal, IL	US 51/WIS 29 west of Rothschild, WI	1984	current	Serves two states: Illinois, Wisconsin
I-40	2,556.61	4,114.46	I-15 in Barstow, CA	US 117 in Wilmington, NC	1957	current	Serves eight states: California, Arizona, New Mexico, Texas, Oklahoma, Arkansas, Tennessee, North Carolina; Associated routes: I-140, I-240, I-440, I-540, I-640, I-840
I-41	175.00	281.64	I-94/US 41 in Russell, IL	I-43/US 41/US 141 in Howard, WI	2015	current	Serves two states: Illinois, Wisconsin
I-42	10.00	16.09	US 412 near Tontitown, AR	I-49 in Springdale, AR	2026	current	Unfinished in Arkansas; Arkansas only; planned in one more: Oklahoma
I-42	31.5	50.7	I-40/NC 540 southeast of Garner, NC US 70 in Goldsboro, NC	US 70/US 70 Bus. southeast of Clayton, NC US 70 in La Grange, NC	2024	current	Unfinished in North Carolina; North Carolina only
I-43	191.55	308.27	I-39/I-90 in Beloit, WI	I-41/US 41/US 141 in Howard, WI	1981	current	Wisconsin only
I-44	636.69	1,024.65	US 82/US 277/US 281/US 287 in Wichita Falls, TX	I-70 in St. Louis, MO	1957	current	Serves three states: Texas, Oklahoma, Missouri; Associated routes: I-244, I-344, I-444
I-45	284.91	458.52	SH 87/Spur 342 in Galveston, TX	I-30/I-345/US 67 in Dallas, TX	1971	current	Texas only Associated route: I-345
I-49	547.52	881.15	I-10/US 167/LA 182 in Lafayette, LA I-220 in Shreveport, LA I-40/US 71 at Alma, AR	I-20 in Shreveport, LA US 59/US 71 in Texarkana, AR I-435/I-470/US 50/US 71 in Kansas City, MO	1984	current	Unfinished in Arkansas and Louisiana; serves three states: Louisiana, Arkansas, Missouri; planned in one more: Texas
I-55	964.25	1,551.81	I-10 in LaPlace, LA	US 41 in Chicago, IL	1960	current	Serves six states: Louisiana, Mississippi, Tennessee, Arkansas, Missouri, Illinois; Associated routes: I-155, I-255, I-355, I-555
I-57	508.92	819.03	I-40/US 67/US 167 in North Little Rock, AR I-55/US 60 in Sikeston, MO	US 67/US 412/US 412B in Walnut Ridge, AR I-94 in Chicago, IL	1965	current	Unfinished in Missouri and Arkansas; serves three states: Arkansas, Missouri, Illinois.
I-59	445.23	716.53	I-10/I-12 in Slidell, LA	I-24 in Wildwood, GA	1960	current	Serves four states: Louisiana, Mississippi, Alabama, Georgia; Associated routes: I-359, I-459, I-759
I-64	963.52	1,550.64	I-70/US 40/US 61 in Wentzville, MO	I-264/I-664/US 13/US 58/US 460 in Chesapeake, VA	1961	current	Serves six states: Missouri, Illinois, Indiana, Kentucky, West Virginia, Virginia; Associated routes: I-264, I-464, I-564, I-664
I-65	887.30	1,427.97	I-10 in Mobile, AL	US 12/US 20 in Gary, IN	1958	current	Serves four states: Alabama, Tennessee, Kentucky, Indiana; Associated routes: I-165, I-265, I-465, I-565, I-865; Planned: I-365 in Kentucky
I-66	—	—	Wichita, KS	Near Pikeville, KY	1991	2015	Served four states: Kansas, Missouri, Illinois, Kentucky; Associated routes: I-66 Spur in Kentucky; The project was unpopular and ultimately cancelled without the interstate being completed; I-66 Spur eventually became I-165
I-66	76.28	122.76	I-81 southwest of Middletown, VA	US 29 in Washington, DC	1961	current	Serves DC and one state: Virginia
I-68	113.15	182.10	I-79 in Morgantown, WV	I-70/US 40/US 522 in Hancock, MD	1991	current	Serves two states: West Virginia, Maryland
I-69	910.10	1,464.66	US 59 in Rosenberg, TX MS 713 southwest of Banks, MS US 51 in Fulton, KY US 41 in Evansville, IN	US 59 in Splendora, TX US 51 in Memphis, TN US 41 in Henderson, KY Hwy 402 at Port Huron, MI	1957	current	Unfinished in Texas, Mississippi, Tennessee, Kentucky, and Indiana; serves six states: Texas, Mississippi, Tennessee, Kentucky, Indiana, Michigan; Planned/started in 2 more: Louisiana, Arkansas; Associated routes: I-69C, I-69E, I-69W, I-169, I-269, I-369, I-469; Planned: I-569 in Kentucky
I-70	2,171.71	3,495.03	I-15 in Cove Fort, UT	I-695 in Woodlawn, MD	1956	current	Serves 10 states: Utah, Colorado, Kansas, Missouri, Illinois, Indiana, Ohio, West Virginia, Pennsylvania, Maryland; Associated routes: I-170, I-270, I-370, I-470, I-670
I-71	345.57	556.14	I-64/I-65 in Louisville, KY	I-90 & I-490 in Cleveland, OH	1959	current	Serves two states: Kentucky, Ohio; Associated routes: I-271, I-471
I-72	179.29	288.54	US 36/US 36 Bus./US 61 (Avenue of the Saints)/Route 110 (CKC) in Hannibal, MO	University Avenue & Church Street in Champaign, IL	1970	current	Serves two states: Missouri, Illinois; Associated route: I-172
I-73	101.10	162.70	I‑74/US 74/US 74 Bus. west of Rockingham, NC	US 220/NC 68 northeast of Stokesdale, NC	1997	current	Unfinished in North Carolina; North Carolina only; planned in five more: South Carolina, Virginia, West Virginia, Ohio, Michigan
I-74	571.72	920.09	I-80 in Davenport, IA I-77 at the Virginia state line northwest of Pine Ridge, NC US 52 in Rural Hall, NC US 74 Alt./US 74 Bus. in Maxton, NC	I-75/US 52 in Cincinnati, OH US 52 in Mount Airy, NC US 74 Bus. northwest of Hamlet, NC US 74 southwest of Lumberton, NC	1974	current	Unfinished in Ohio and North Carolina; serves five states: Iowa, Illinois, Indiana, Ohio, North Carolina; planned in three more: West Virginia, Virginia, South Carolina; Associated routes: I-474; Planned: I-274 in North Carolina
I-75	1,786.47	2,875.04	SR 826/SR 924 in Miami Lakes, FL	International Bridge at Sault Ste. Marie, MI	1958	current	Serves six states: Florida, Georgia, Tennessee, Kentucky, Ohio, Michigan; Associated routes: I-175, I-275, I-375, I-475, I-575, I-675
I-76	187.29	301.41	I-70 in Arvada, CO	I-80 at Big Springs, NE	1975	current	Serves two states: Colorado, Nebraska
I-76	435.66	701.13	I-71/US 224 in Westfield Township, OH	I-295/Route 42 in Bellmawr, NJ	1964	current	Serves three states: Ohio, Pennsylvania, New Jersey; Associated routes: I-176, I-276, I-376, I-476, I-676
I-77	610.10	981.86	I-26 in Cayce, SC	I-90 in Cleveland, OH	1958	current	Serves five states: South Carolina, North Carolina, Virginia, West Virginia, Ohio; Associated route: I-277
I-78	146.28	235.41	I-81 in Union Township, PA	Canal Street in New York, NY	1957	current	Serves three states: Pennsylvania, New Jersey, New York; Associated routes: I-278, I-478, I-678, I-878
I-79	343.46	552.75	I-77 in Charleston, WV	PA 5/PA 290/Bayfront Parkway in Erie, PA	1967	current	Serves two states: West Virginia, Pennsylvania; Associated routes: I-279, I-579
I-80	2,900.76	4,668.32	US 101 in San Francisco, CA	I-95 in Teaneck, NJ	1956	current	Serves 11 states: California, Nevada, Utah, Wyoming, Nebraska, Iowa, Illinois, Indiana, Ohio, Pennsylvania, New Jersey; Associated routes: I-180, I-238, I-280, I-380, I-480, I-580, I-680, I-780, I-880, I-980
I-81	855.02	1,376.02	I-40 in Dandrige, TN	Hwy 137 at Wellesley Island, NY	1961	current	Serves six states: Tennessee, Virginia, West Virginia, Maryland, Pennsylvania, New York; Associated routes: I-381, I-581, I-781
I-82	143.58	231.07	I-90/US 97 in Ellensburg, WA	I-84/US 30 in Hermiston, OR	1957	current	Serves two states: Washington, Oregon; Associated route: I-182
I-82	—	—	I-81/I-84/US 6 in Scranton, PA	I-95 in Teaneck, NJ	1957	1958	Served two states: Pennsylvania, New Jersey; Was the initial designation to what is now I-380 and I-80
I-82	—	—	I-84 in East Hartford, CT	Providence, RI	1956	1968	Served one state: Connecticut, was planned for one state: Rhode Island; Redesignated as I-84 in 1968
I-83	85.03	136.84	President Street & Fayette Street in Baltimore, MD	I-81/US 322 north of Progress, PA	1959	current	Serves two states: Maryland, Pennsylvania; Associated route: I-283
I-84	769.62	1,238.58	I-5/US 30 in Portland, OR	I-80/US 189 in Echo, UT	1980	current	Serves three states: Oregon, Idaho, Utah; Associated route: I-184
I-84	232.71	374.51	I-81/I-380/US 6 in Dunmore, PA	I-90/Massachusetts Turnpike in Sturbridge, MA	1963	current	Serves four states: Pennsylvania, New York, Connecticut, Massachusetts; Associated routes: I-384, I-684
I-85	666.05	1,071.90	I-65/US 82 in Montgomery, AL	I-95/US 460 in Petersburg, VA	1958	current	Unfinished in Alabama; serves five states: Alabama, Georgia, South Carolina, North Carolina, Virginia; Associated routes: I-185, I-285, I-385, I-485, I-585, I-785, I-885, I-985; Future/Planned: I-685 in both Alabama and North Carolina
I-86	62.85	101.15	I-84/US 30 northeast of Declo, ID	I-15 in Chubbuck, ID	1980	current	Idaho only
I-86	254.02	408.81	I-90 in Greenfield Township, PA I-81/NY 17/NY 990G in Kirkwood, NY	NY 17/NY 26 in Vestal, NY NY 17/NY 79 in Windsor, NY	1999	current	Unfinished in New York; serves two states: Pennsylvania, New York
I-86	38.97	62.72	I-84 in East Hartford, CT	I-90 in Sturbridge, MA	1968	1984	Served two states: Connecticut, Massachusetts; Redesignated as I-84 in 1984 when the I-84 Hartford-Providence corridor was cancelled
I-87	12.90	20.76	I-40/I-440/US 64 in Raleigh, NC	US 64/US 264 in Wendell, NC	2017	current	Unfinished in North Carolina; North Carolina only; planned in one more: Virginia; Associated route: I-587
I-87	333.49	536.70	I-278 in Port Morris, NY	A-15 at Champlain, NY	1957	current	New York only Associated routes: I-287, I-587, I-787
I-88	140.60	226.27	I-80/IL 5/IL 92/Route 110 (CKC) northeast of East Moline, IL	I-290/Route 110 (CKC) in Hillside, IL	1987	current	Illinois only
I-88	117.75	189.50	I-81 in Chenango, NY	I-90/New York State Thruway in Rotterdam, NY	1968	current	New York only
I-89	191.12	307.58	I-93/Everett Turnpike/NH 3A in Bow, NH	Route 133 at Highgate, VT	1960	current	Serves two states: New Hampshire, Vermont; Associated route: I-189
I-90	3,099.74	4,988.55	SR 519 in Seattle, WA	Route 1A in Boston, MA	1956	current	Serves 13 states: Washington, Idaho, Montana, Wyoming, South Dakota, Minnesota, Wisconsin, Illinois, Indiana, Ohio, Pennsylvania, New York, Massachusetts; Associated routes: I-190, I-290, I-390, I-490, I-590, I-690, I-790, I-890, I-990; Longest Interstate highway
I-91	290.37	467.31	I-95 in New Haven, CT	A-55 at Derby Line, VT	1958	current	Serves three states: Connecticut, Massachusetts, Vermont; Associated routes: I-291, I-391, I-691
I-93	189.95	305.69	I-95/US 1/Route 128 in Canton, MA	I-91 in Waterford, VT	1957	current	Serves three states: Massachusetts, New Hampshire, Vermont; Associated routes: I-293, I-393
I-94	1,555.43	2,503.22	I-90/US 87/US 212 in Lockwood, MT	Highway 402 at Port Huron, MI	1956	current	Serves seven states: Montana, North Dakota, Minnesota, Wisconsin, Illinois, Indiana, Michigan; Associated routes: I-194, I-294, I-394, I-494, I-694, I-794, I-894
I-95	1,905.96	3,067.35	US 1 in Miami, FL	Route 95 at Houlton, ME	1957	current	Serves DC and 15 states: Florida, Georgia, South Carolina, North Carolina, Virginia, Maryland, Delaware, Pennsylvania, New Jersey, New York, Connecticut, Rhode Island, Massachusetts, New Hampshire, Maine; Associated routes: I-195, I-295, I-395, I-495, I-595, I-695, I-795, I-895; Longest primary north-south Interstate highway
I-96	192.032	309.046	US 31 in Norton Shores, MI	I-75 in Detroit, MI	1959	current	Michigan only Associated routes: I-196, I-296, I-496, I-696
I-97	17.62	28.36	US 50/US 301 in Parole, MD	I-695/I-895A in Brooklyn Park, MD	1987	current	Maryland only
I-99	161.68	260.20	US 220/US 220 Bus. north of Bedford, PA I-180/US 15/US 220 in Williamsport, PA	US 220/PA 26 northeast of Bellefonte, PA I-86/US 15/NY 17/NY 352 at Painted Post, NY	1998	current	Unfinished in Pennsylvania; serves two states: Pennsylvania, New York
Former; Proposed and unbuilt

== Other regions ==
In addition to the 48 contiguous states, Interstate Highways are found in Hawaii, Alaska, and Puerto Rico. The Federal Highway Administration funds four routes in Alaska and three routes in Puerto Rico under the same program as the rest of the Interstate Highway System. These routes are not required to meet the same standards as the mainland routes:

Highways on the Interstate System in Alaska and Puerto Rico shall be designed in accordance with such geometric and construction standards as are adequate for current and probable future traffic demands and the needs of the locality of the highway.

=== Hawaii ===
A map of Hawaii's Interstate Highways, excluding H-201

The Interstate Highways on the island of Oʻahu, Hawaii are signed with the standard Interstate Highway shield, with the letter "H-" prefixed before the number. They are fully controlled-access routes built to the same standards as the mainland Interstate Highways.

Number	Length (mi)	Length (km)	Southern or western terminus	Northern or eastern terminus	Formed	Removed	Notes
H-1	27.16	43.71	Route 93 in Kapolei	Route 72 in Honolulu	1960	current	Associated route: H-201
H-2	8.33	13.41	H-1 in Pearl City	Route 99 in Wahiawa	1960	current	
H-3	15.32	24.66	H-1/H-201 in Halawa	Marine Corps Base Hawaii	1997	current	

=== Alaska ===
A map of Alaska's Interstate Highways

Alaska's Interstate Highways are unsigned. They all have state highway numbers that do not match the Interstate Highway numbers.

Number	Length (mi)	Length (km)	Southern or western terminus	Northern or eastern terminus	Formed	Removed	Notes
A-1	408.23	656.98	Anchorage	Hwy. 1 at Alcan Border	1976	current	Glenn Highway, Richardson Highway, Tok Cut-Off, Alaska Highway
A-2	202.18	325.38	Tok	Fairbanks	1976	current	Alaska Highway, Richardson Highway
A-3	148.12	238.38	Anchorage	Soldotna	1976	current	Seward Highway, Sterling Highway
A-4	323.69	520.93	Gateway, near Palmer	Fairbanks	1976	current	Parks Highway

=== Puerto Rico ===
A map of the Interstates in Puerto Rico

Puerto Rico signs its Interstate Highways as territorial routes, as the numbers do not match their official Interstate Highway designations. Many of the territory's routes are freeway-standard toll roads.

Number	Length (mi)	Length (km)	Southern or western terminus	Northern or eastern terminus	Formed	Removed	Notes
PR-1	71.08	114.39	PR-2 in Ponce	PR-2 in San Juan	1976	current	Follows PR-52
PR-2	138.13	222.30	PR-1 in Ponce	PR-3 in San Juan	1976	current	Follows PR-22
PR-3	40.56	65.27	PR-3 in Humacao	PR-2 in San Juan	1976	current	Follows PR-66
