= 580 (disambiguation) =

580 most commonly refers to:

- 580 (number), a number
- 580 AD, a Gregorian calendar year
- 580 BC, a Gregorian calendar year

580 may also refer to:

== Communications ==
- 580 AM, an AM radio frequency
- Area code 580, an area code in Oklahoma, United States

== Electronics ==
- Dell Inspiron 580, a desktop computer
- Macintosh LC 580, a personal computer
- Sony Alpha 580, a midrange-level digital single-lens reflex camera

== Places ==
- 580 California Street, a high-rise office building in San Francisco, California, United States
- 580 Selene, a minor planet orbiting the Sun

== Transportation ==
=== Aircraft and spacecraft ===
- Arado E.580, a German World War II jet fighter design
- Caudron C.580, a French advanced trainer aircraft
- Convair CV-580, an American airliner
- Kosmos 580, a Soviet satellite
- Lycoming IO-580, an American horizontally opposed, six-cylinder aircraft engine
- Lycoming GSO-580, an American family of eight-cylinder horizontally opposed, supercharged, carburetor-equipped aircraft engines

=== Land vehicles ===
- Fengon 580, a 2016–present Chinese mid-size crossover SUV
- IVECO 580, an Italian suburban single-decker bus
- TR-580, a Romanian main battle tank

=== Watercraft ===
- USS Barbel (SS-580), the lead ship of the Barbel-class submarines in the United States Navy
- USS Shada (SP-580), a patrol vessel in the United States Navy

=== Roads and routes ===
- Interstate 580 (disambiguation), multiple freeways in the United States
- List of highways numbered 580

=== Rail ===
- Hong Lok Road stop, Hong Kong; digital code

== Other uses ==
- Minuscule 580, a Greek minuscule manuscript
- Remington Model 580, an American bolt-action rifle
