= List of highways numbered 475 =

Route 475 or Highway 475 may refer to:

== Canada ==
- Manitoba Provincial Road 475
- New Brunswick Route 475

== Japan ==
- Japan National Route 475

== United States ==
- Interstate 475
- Florida State Road 475
  - County Road 475 (Marion County, Florida)
    - County Road 475A (Marion County, Florida)
    - County Road 475B (Marion County, Florida)
    - County Road 475C (Marion County, Florida)
- Louisiana Highway 475
- Maryland Route 475
- Mississippi Highway 475
- New Mexico State Road 475
- Pennsylvania Route 475
- Puerto Rico Highway 475
- Tennessee State Route 475
- Texas:
  - Texas State Highway Loop 475
  - Farm to Market Road 475
  - Ranch to Market Road 475 (former)

Preceded by 474	Lists of highways 475	Succeeded by 476
