= C215 =

C215 may refer to:

== Places ==
- C215 Viaduct, a box girder bridge in Taiwan
- C215, Tasmania, Australia; see List of road routes in Tasmania
- C215, Victoria, Australia; see List of road routes in Victoria

== Vehicles ==
- Mercedes-Benz C215, a model of car
- New York City Subway car C215; a crane car, see List of New York City Subway R-type contracts

== Other uses ==
- C215 (street artist), a graffiti artist from France

== See also ==
- 215 (disambiguation)
- C (disambiguation)
