= C205 =

C205 or variant. may refer to:

== Vehicles ==
- Mercedes-Benz C-Class (C205), a car
- SpaceX Crew Dragon C205, a SpaceX Dragon 2 crew transport space capsule
- C205, a vehicle used by Pennsylvania mass transit provider CamTran

=== Aviation ===
- Cessna 205 (C 205), a general aviation light airplane
- Macchi C.205 Veltro, a WW2 Italian fighter plane
- New Avio C205, an acrobatic ultralight airplane

== Electronics ==
- LG C205, a cellphone; see List of LG mobile phones
- Motorola C205, a cellphone; see List of Motorola Mobility products
- Nokia C2-05, a cellphone

== Other uses ==
- Wombelano Road (C205), Victoria, Australia; see List of road routes in Victoria

== See also ==
- 205 (disambiguation)
- C (disambiguation)
