= 215 (disambiguation) =

215 may refer to:

- 215 (number)
- 215 AD, a year
- 215 BC, a year

== Arts, entertainment, and media ==
=== Events ===
- UFC 215, a 2017 mixed martial arts event in Alberta, Canada

=== Literature ===
- Lectionary 215, a Greek manuscript
- Minuscule 215, a Greek minuscule manuscript

== Government and military ==
- 215th Battalion (Canada), a unit in the Canadian Expeditionary Force
- 215th Brigade (United Kingdom), a Home Service formation of the British Army
- 215th Infantry Division (Wehrmacht), a major military unit of the Nazi German Army
- 215th Pennsylvania Infantry Regiment, an infantry regiment of the Union Army of the United States
- 215th Rifle Division, an infantry division of the Red Army of the Soviet Union
- PEC 215, a proposed constitutional amendment to the constitution of Brazil
- VMF-215, a fighter squadron of the United States Marine Corps
- VPB-215, a Patrol Bombing Squadron of the United States Navy

== Transportation ==
=== Aircraft ===
- Canadair CL-215, a Canadian amphibious aircraft
- Dornier Do 215, a German light bomber
- Ikarus 215, a Yugoslav light bomber
- Prue 215, an American high-wing glider

=== Buses ===
- MAZ-215, a Belarusian low-floor articulated bus

=== Engines ===
- 2si 215, a line of two-stroke aircraft engines
- RD-215, a dual nozzle liquid rocket engine
- RK 215, a line of diesel engines built by MAN

=== Rail transportation ===
- 215 series, a bilevel suburban train type used by East Japan Railway Corporation
- DB Class 215, a German 4 axle diesel locomotive

=== Roads ===
- List of highways numbered 215, a list of highways named 215
- 215th Street (Manhattan)
- Interstate 215 (disambiguation), a disambiguation of interstate highways named 215

=== Spacecraft ===
- Kosmos 215, a Soviet satellite
- USA-215, an American reconnaissance satellite

=== Transit routes and stations ===
- Route 215 (MBTA), a bus route in Massachusetts, US
- 215th Street station, a local station on the IRT Broadway–Seventh Avenue Line of the New York City Subway

=== Watercraft ===
- German submarine U-215, a Type VIID mine-laying U-boat in Nazi Germany's Kriegsmarine
- Soviet submarine Shch-215, a Shchuka-class submarine in the Soviet Navy
- USCGC Sequoia (WLB-215), seagoing buoy tender in the United States Coast Guard
- USS Borie (DD-215), a Clemson-class destroyer in the United States Navy
- USS Growler (SS-215), a Gato-class submarine in the United States Navy

== Other uses ==
- 215 Oenone, an asteroid
- Area code 215, an area code in Pennsylvania, United States
- Nokia 215, a dual-band feature phone

== See also ==
- 215th (disambiguation)
