= List of highways numbered 480 =

Route 480 or Highway 480 may refer to:

== Canada ==
- Manitoba Provincial Road 480
- New Brunswick Route 480
- Newfoundland and Labrador Route 480

== Ireland ==
- R480 regional road

== Japan ==
- Japan National Route 480

== United States ==
- Interstate 480
  - Interstate 480N (unsigned)
- California State Route 480 (former)
- Maryland Route 480
- Puerto Rico Highway 480
- West Virginia Route 480

Preceded by 479	Lists of highways 480	Succeeded by 481
