= Piotr Moncarz =

Polish-American civil engineer (born 1949)

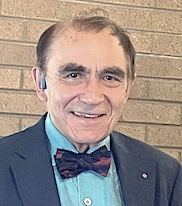
- Born: Piotr Daniel Moncarz; June 27, 1949 (age 77)
- Citizenship: Poland, United States
- Education: University of Colorado Boulder; Stanford University
- Occupations: Civil engineer, academic
- Awards: Member, National Academy of Engineering (2017)

Piotr Daniel Moncarz (born 27 June 1949) is a Polish-American civil engineer and academic. He is an adjunct professor emeritus of civil and environmental engineering at Stanford University, where he taught graduate courses for more than 35 years. He spent over four decades at the engineering consulting firm Exponent, formerly Failure Analysis Associates, as a principal engineer, vice president, and senior fellow.

His work covers materials engineering, earthquake engineering, and the investigation of structural failures. He was elected to the National Academy of Engineering in 2017. He is a founder of XGS Energy, a geothermal energy company, where he is vice chair and chief technologist.

== Education ==
Moncarz completed his technical secondary education at the Technikum Geodezyjno-Drogowe in Poznań in 1968. He received a graduate degree in civil engineering from the University of Colorado Boulder in 1975 and a Ph.D. in civil and structural engineering from Stanford University in 1981, specializing in earthquake engineering. He is a licensed professional engineer in the United States and Canada.

== Career ==
=== Exponent ===
Moncarz joined Failure Analysis Associates, later renamed Exponent, in 1980 and remained with the firm until 2022. He held the positions of principal engineer and senior fellow. His investigative work covered reinforced and prestressed concrete, seismic assessment, steel structure failures, and offshore platforms.

After the 1989 Loma Prieta earthquake, Moncarz, then a principal engineer at Failure Analysis Associates, examined the wreckage of the Cypress Street Viaduct, a double-deck section of Interstate 880 in Oakland that collapsed during the earthquake. He had been retained as a consultant by The New York Times, which reported his assessment that the roadway's resonant frequency may have matched the frequency of the earthquake's ground motion, explaining why the viaduct failed while nearby unreinforced masonry buildings were left largely intact. Moncarz told the paper that "engineers are only now beginning to understand how to endow structures with resonant frequencies that improve their resistance to quakes."

Moncarz co-authored a forensic review of the Hyatt Regency walkway collapse published in the Journal of Performance of Constructed Facilities in 2000, examining the engineering process failures that allowed a flawed connection design to be built.

He co-authored a stability analysis of the lift-slab towers involved in the 1987 L'Ambiance Plaza collapse in Bridgeport, Connecticut, in which 28 construction workers died.

He also published on the fracture of welded moment connections in steel-framed buildings following the 1994 Northridge earthquake, a finding that carried implications for seismic building codes.

=== Stanford University ===
Moncarz has held an adjunct professorship in the Department of Civil and Environmental Engineering at Stanford University and is a center fellow at Stanford's Center for Sustainable Development and Global Competitiveness.

He co-created and served as co-academic director of Stanford's Top 500 Innovators Program, an initiative with Poland's Ministry of Science and Higher Education that brought Polish researchers and entrepreneurs to Stanford for training in innovation and commercialization. The program ran at Stanford from 2011 to 2013.

=== National Academy of Engineering ===
In 2017, Moncarz was elected a member of the National Academy of Engineering. His election citation reads: "for dedication to global improvement of the safety and reliability of engineering systems and to cooperation beyond political borders."

=== XGS Energy ===
In 2008, Moncarz co-founded Geothermic Solution, a company developing technology to extract geothermal heat from deep geological formations without conventional hydrothermal resources. The company was renamed XGS Energy in November 2022 and raised a $14 million Series A the following year. Moncarz serves as vice chairman of its board.

=== Poland–United States engagement ===
Moncarz co-founded and chaired the US-Polish Trade Council, a pro-bono organization for knowledge transfer between Poland and the United States. He served on the first council of Poland's National Centre for Research and Development from 2007. He sat on the supervisory board of ElectroMobility Poland S.A. from the company's founding in 2016, and chaired it as of 2017.

He is president of the Poland in Silicon Valley Center for Science, Innovation and Entrepreneurship (PolSV), which connects Polish scientific and entrepreneurial talent with Silicon Valley.

== Selected publications ==
- Moncarz, P. D.; Krawinkler, H. (June 1981). Theory and Application of Experimental Model Analysis in Earthquake Engineering. Report No. 50. John A. Blume Earthquake Engineering Center, Stanford University.
- Moncarz, P.; Lahnert, B.; Hooley, R.; Osteraas, J. (1992). "Analysis of Stability of L'Ambiance Plaza Lift-Slab Towers". Journal of Performance of Constructed Facilities. 6 (4): 232–245.
- Moncarz, P. D.; Taylor, R. K. (2000). "Engineering Process Failure—Hyatt Walkway Collapse". Journal of Performance of Constructed Facilities. 14 (2): 46–50.
- Moncarz, P. D.; McDonald, B.; Caligiuri, R. (2000). "Earthquake Failures of Welded Building Connections". International Journal of Solids and Structures. 38: 2025–2032.
- Moncarz, P. D.; Griffith, M.; Noakowski, P. (2007). "Collapse of a Reinforced Concrete Dome in a Wastewater Treatment Plant Digester Tank". Journal of Performance of Constructed Facilities. 21 (1): 4.
- Moncarz, P. D.; Kurtyka, M. (2023). "Engineering Carbon-Free Energy for All". The Bridge. National Academy of Engineering. 53 (3).

== Honors ==
- Member, National Academy of Engineering (2017)
- Fellow, American Society of Civil Engineers
- Officer's Cross, Order of Polonia Restituta, conferred by President Bronisław Komorowski on 23 April 2014 "for outstanding service in developing Polish-American scientific and research cooperation, and for work on behalf of the Polish diaspora"
- Honorary graduate, Warsaw University of Technology (2007)
- Medal Pro Memoria (2006)

== Personal life ==
Moncarz married Anita Marya Star Habdank-Kolaczkowska in 1976. His mother-in-law, Diana Hope Habdank-Kolaczkowska (née Hay-Neave), worked as a codebreaker at Bletchley Park during the Second World War; an oral history recording with her is held by the Computer History Museum.
