= 205 (disambiguation) =

205 is a year.

205 may also refer to:

- 205 BC
- 205 (number)
- Peugeot 205, a supermini car
- 205 series, an electric multiple unit commuter train type
- AK-205, a carbine
- UFC 205, a mixed martial arts event promoted by the Ultimate Fighting Championship
- 205 Martha, a large main asteroid belt
- Macchi C.205 Veltro, an Italian World War II fighter aircraft
- USA-205, a satellite formerly operated by the United States Missile Defense Agency
- Radical 205 1 of 4 Kangxi radicals composed of 13 strokes meaning "frog" or "amphibian"
- Mall 205, an enclosed shopping mall located at the junction of Interstate 205 and S.E. Washington Street in Portland, Oregon's Hazelwood neighborhood, in the United States
- WWE 205 Live, an American professional wrestling streaming television program that was produced by WWE
- LFU 205, a monoplane

== See also ==
- Area codes 205 and 659
- Flight 205 (disambiguation)
- Interstate 205 (disambiguation)
