= List of highways numbered 477 =

The following highways are numbered 477:

== Canada ==
- Manitoba Provincial Road 477

== Japan ==
- Japan National Route 477

== United States ==
- Louisiana Highway 477
- Maryland Route 477
- Pennsylvania Route 477
- Puerto Rico Highway 477
- Farm to Market Road 477 (Texas)

Preceded by 476	Lists of highways 477	Succeeded by 478
