= Kosmos 562 =

Soviet satellite launched in 1973

- Mission type: ABM radar target
- COSPAR ID: 1973-035A
- SATCAT no.: 06665

Spacecraft properties
- Spacecraft type: DS-P1-Yu
- Manufacturer: Yuzhnoye
- Launch mass: 400 kilograms (880 lb)

Start of mission
- Launch date: 5 June 1973, 11:29:47 UTC
- Rocket: Kosmos-2I 63SM
- Launch site: Plesetsk 133/1

End of mission
- Decay date: 7 January 1974

Orbital parameters
- Reference system: Geocentric
- Regime: Low Earth
- Perigee altitude: 267 kilometres (166 mi)
- Apogee altitude: 464 kilometres (288 mi)
- Inclination: 70.9 degrees
- Period: 91.9 minutes

Kosmos 562 (Russian: Космос 562 meaning Cosmos 562), known before launch as DS-P1-Yu No.66, was a Soviet satellite which was launched in 1973 as part of the Dnepropetrovsk Sputnik programme. It was a 400-kilogram (880 lb) spacecraft, which was built by the Yuzhnoye Design Bureau, and was used as a radar calibration target for anti-ballistic missile tests.

== Launch ==
Kosmos 562 was successfully launched into low Earth orbit at 11:29:47 UTC on 5 June 1973. The launch took place from Site 133/1 at the Plesetsk Cosmodrome, and used a Kosmos-2I 63SM carrier rocket.

== Orbit ==
Upon reaching orbit, the satellite was assigned its Kosmos designation, and received the International Designator 1973-035A. The North American Aerospace Defense Command assigned it the catalogue number 06665.

Kosmos 562 was the sixty-third of seventy nine DS-P1-Yu satellites to be launched, and the fifty-seventh of seventy two to successfully reach orbit. It was operated in an orbit with a perigee of 267 kilometres (166 mi), an apogee of 464 kilometres (288 mi), 70.9 degrees of inclination, and an orbital period of 91.9 minutes. It remained in orbit until it decayed and reentered the atmosphere on 7 January 1974.

== See also ==
- 1973 in spaceflight
