= List of highways numbered 479 =

The following highways are numbered 479:

== Japan ==
- Japan National Route 479

== United States ==
- Interstate 479 (former)
- Louisiana Highway 479
- Maryland Route 479 (former)
- Puerto Rico Highway 479

Preceded by 478	Lists of highways 479	Succeeded by 480
