= Kosmos 608 =

Soviet radar calibration satellite

- Mission type: ABM radar target
- COSPAR ID: 1973-091A
- SATCAT no.: 06941

Spacecraft properties
- Spacecraft type: DS-P1-Yu
- Manufacturer: Yuzhnoye
- Launch mass: 400 kilograms (880 lb)

Start of mission
- Launch date: 20 November 1973, 12:29:58 UTC
- Rocket: Kosmos-2I 63SM
- Launch site: Plesetsk 133/1

End of mission
- Decay date: 10 July 1974

Orbital parameters
- Reference system: Geocentric
- Regime: Low Earth
- Perigee altitude: 265 kilometres (165 mi)
- Apogee altitude: 486 kilometres (302 mi)
- Inclination: 70.9 degrees
- Period: 92.1 minutes

Kosmos 608 (Russian: Космос 608 meaning Cosmos 608), known before launch as DS-P1-Yu No.69, was a Soviet satellite which was launched in 1973 as part of the Dnepropetrovsk Sputnik programme. It was a 400-kilogram (880 lb) spacecraft, which was built by the Yuzhnoye Design Bureau, and was used as a radar calibration target for anti-ballistic missile tests.

== Launch ==
Kosmos 608 was successfully launched into low Earth orbit at 12:29:58 UTC on 20 November 1973. The launch took place from Site 133/1 at the Plesetsk Cosmodrome, and used a Kosmos-2I 63SM carrier rocket.

== Orbit ==
Upon reaching orbit, the satellite was assigned its Kosmos designation, and received the International Designator 1973-091A. The North American Aerospace Defense Command assigned it the catalogue number 06941.

Kosmos 608 was the sixty-sixth of seventy nine DS-P1-Yu satellites to be launched, and the sixtieth of seventy two to successfully reach orbit. It was operated in an orbit with a perigee of 265 kilometres (165 mi), an apogee of 486 kilometres (302 mi), 70.9 degrees of inclination, and an orbital period of 92.1 minutes. It remained in orbit until it decayed and reentered the atmosphere on 10 July 1974.

== See also ==
- 1973 in spaceflight
