= Kosmos 611 =

Soviet radar calibration satellite

- Mission type: ABM radar target
- COSPAR ID: 1973-094A
- SATCAT no.: 06952

Spacecraft properties
- Spacecraft type: DS-P1-Yu
- Manufacturer: Yuzhnoye
- Launch mass: 400 kilograms (880 lb)

Start of mission
- Launch date: 28 November 1973, 09:29:58 UTC
- Rocket: Kosmos-2I 63SM
- Launch site: Plesetsk 133/1

End of mission
- Decay date: 19 June 1974

Orbital parameters
- Reference system: Geocentric
- Regime: Low Earth
- Perigee altitude: 264 kilometres (164 mi)
- Apogee altitude: 466 kilometres (290 mi)
- Inclination: 70.9 degrees
- Period: 91.8 minutes

Kosmos 611 (Russian: Космос 611 meaning Cosmos 611), known before launch as DS-P1-Yu No.64, was a Soviet satellite which was launched in 1973 as part of the Dnepropetrovsk Sputnik programme. It was a 400-kilogram (880 lb) spacecraft, which was built by the Yuzhnoye Design Bureau, and was used as a radar calibration target for anti-ballistic missile tests.

== Launch ==
Kosmos 611 was successfully launched into low Earth orbit at 09:29:58 UTC on 28 November 1973. The launch took place from Site 133/1 at the Plesetsk Cosmodrome, and used a Kosmos-2I 63SM carrier rocket.

== Orbit ==
Upon reaching orbit, the satellite was assigned its Kosmos designation, and received the International Designator 1973-094A. The North American Aerospace Defense Command assigned it the catalogue number 06952.

Kosmos 611 was the sixty-seventh of seventy nine DS-P1-Yu satellites to be launched, and the sixty-first of seventy two to successfully reach orbit. It was operated in an orbit with a perigee of 264 kilometres (164 mi), an apogee of 466 kilometres (290 mi), 70.9 degrees of inclination, and an orbital period of 91.8 minutes. It remained in orbit until it decayed and reentered the atmosphere on 19 June 1974.

== See also ==
- 1973 in spaceflight
