= Kosmos 558 =

Soviet radar calibration satellite

- Mission type: ABM radar target
- COSPAR ID: 1973-029A
- SATCAT no.: 06645

Spacecraft properties
- Spacecraft type: DS-P1-Yu
- Manufacturer: Yuzhnoye
- Launch mass: 400 kilograms (880 lb)

Start of mission
- Launch date: 17 May 1973, 13:19:58 UTC
- Rocket: Kosmos-2I 63SM
- Launch site: Plesetsk 133/1

End of mission
- Decay date: 22 December 1973

Orbital parameters
- Reference system: Geocentric
- Regime: Low Earth
- Perigee altitude: 264 kilometres (164 mi)
- Apogee altitude: 477 kilometres (296 mi)
- Inclination: 70.9 degrees
- Period: 92 minutes

Kosmos 558 (Russian: Космос 558 meaning Cosmos 558), known before launch as DS-P1-Yu No.65, was a Soviet satellite, which was launched in 1973 as part of the Dnepropetrovsk Sputnik programme. It was a 400-kilogram (880 lb) spacecraft, which was built by the Yuzhnoye Design Bureau, and was used as a radar calibration target for anti-ballistic missile tests.

== Launch ==
Kosmos 558 was successfully launched into low Earth orbit at 13:19:58 UTC on 17 May 1973. The launch took place from Site 133/1 at the Plesetsk Cosmodrome, and used a Kosmos-2I 63SM carrier rocket.

== Orbit ==
Upon reaching orbit, the satellite was assigned its Kosmos designation and received the International Designator 1973-029A. The North American Aerospace Defense Command assigned it the catalogue number 06645.

Kosmos 558 was the sixty-second of seventy-nine DS-P1-Yu satellites to be launched, and the fifty-sixth of seventy-two to successfully reach orbit. It was operated in an orbit with a perigee of 264 kilometres (164 mi), an apogee of 477 kilometres (296 mi), 70.9 degrees of inclination, and an orbital period of 92 minutes. It remained in orbit until it decayed and reentered the atmosphere on 22 December 1973.

== See also ==
- 1973 in spaceflight
