= Kosmos 553 =

Soviet radar calibration satellite

- Mission type: ABM radar target
- COSPAR ID: 1973-020A
- SATCAT no.: 06427

Spacecraft properties
- Spacecraft type: DS-P1-Yu
- Manufacturer: Yuzhnoye
- Launch mass: 400 kilograms (880 lb)

Start of mission
- Launch date: 12 April 1973, 11:49:55 UTC
- Rocket: Kosmos-2I 63SM
- Launch site: Plesetsk 133/1

End of mission
- Decay date: 11 November 1973

Orbital parameters
- Reference system: Geocentric
- Regime: Low Earth
- Perigee altitude: 264 kilometres (164 mi)
- Apogee altitude: 470 kilometres (290 mi)
- Inclination: 70.9 degrees
- Period: 91.9 minutes

Kosmos 553 (Russian: Космос 553 meaning Cosmos 553), known before launch as DS-P1-Yu No.55, was a Soviet satellite which was launched in 1973 as part of the Dnepropetrovsk Sputnik programme. It was a 400-kilogram (880 lb) spacecraft, which was built by the Yuzhnoye Design Bureau, and was used as a radar calibration target for anti-ballistic missile tests.

== Launch ==
Kosmos 553 was successfully launched into low Earth orbit at 11:49:55 UTC on 12 April 1973. The launch took place from Site 133/1 at the Plesetsk Cosmodrome, and used a Kosmos-2I 63SM carrier rocket.

== Orbit ==
Upon reaching orbit, the satellite was assigned its Kosmos designation, and received the International Designator 1973-020A. The North American Aerospace Defense Command assigned it the catalogue number 06427.

Kosmos 553 was the sixty-first of seventy nine DS-P1-Yu satellites to be launched, and the fifty-fifth of seventy two to successfully reach orbit. It was operated in an orbit with a perigee of 264 kilometres (164 mi), an apogee of 470 kilometres (290 mi), 70.9 degrees of inclination, and an orbital period of 91.9 minutes. It remained in orbit until it decayed and reentered the atmosphere on 11 November 1973.

== See also ==
- 1973 in spaceflight
