= Kosmos 601 =

Soviet radar calibration satellite

- Mission type: ABM radar target
- COSPAR ID: 1973-075A
- SATCAT no.: 06875

Spacecraft properties
- Spacecraft type: DS-P1-Yu
- Manufacturer: Yuzhnoye
- Launch mass: 400 kilograms (880 lb)

Start of mission
- Launch date: 16 October 1973, 14:00:01 UTC
- Rocket: Kosmos-2I 63SM
- Launch site: Plesetsk 133/1

End of mission
- Decay date: 15 August 1974

Orbital parameters
- Reference system: Geocentric
- Regime: Low Earth
- Perigee altitude: 197 kilometres (122 mi)
- Apogee altitude: 1,404 kilometres (872 mi)
- Inclination: 81.8 degrees
- Period: 100.9 minutes

Kosmos 601 (Russian: Космос 601 meaning Cosmos 601), known before launch as DS-P1-Yu No.60, was a Soviet satellite which was launched in 1973 as part of the Dnepropetrovsk Sputnik programme. It was a 400-kilogram (880 lb) spacecraft, which was built by the Yuzhnoye Design Bureau, and was used as a radar calibration target for anti-ballistic missile tests.

== Launch ==
Kosmos 601 was successfully launched into low Earth orbit at 14:00:01 UTC on 16 October 1973. The launch took place from Site 133/1 at the Plesetsk Cosmodrome, and used a Kosmos-2I 63SM carrier rocket.

== Orbit ==
Upon reaching orbit, the satellite was assigned its Kosmos designation, and received the International Designator 1973-075A. The North American Aerospace Defense Command assigned it the catalogue number 06875.

Kosmos 601 was the sixty-fifth of seventy nine DS-P1-Yu satellites to be launched, and the fifty-ninth of seventy two to successfully reach orbit. It was operated in an orbit with a perigee of 197 kilometres (122 mi), an apogee of 1,404 kilometres (872 mi), 81.8 degrees of inclination, and an orbital period of 100.9 minutes. It remained in orbit until it decayed and reentered the atmosphere on 15 August 1974.

== See also ==
- 1973 in spaceflight
