= List of highways numbered 580 =

Route 580, or Highway 580, may refer to:

== Canada ==
- Alberta Highway 580
- New Brunswick Route 580
- Ontario Highway 580

== United Kingdom ==
- A580 road

== United States ==
- I-580
  - Interstate 580 (California), a spur connecting the San Francisco Bay Area to the San Joaquin Valley from U.S. Route 101 to Interstate 5
  - Interstate 580 (Nevada), a spur connecting Carson City, Nevada to Reno, Nevada (also signed as U.S. Route 395)
  - Interstate 580 (Nebraska), a former route and now part of U.S. Route 75 in Omaha, Nebraska
- SR 580
- Route 580
- MD 580
- CR 580
- PA 580
- PR-580
- Spur 580

Preceded by 579	Lists of highways 580	Succeeded by 581
