= List of highways numbered 476 =

The following highways are numbered 476:

== Canada ==
- Manitoba Provincial Road 476

== Japan ==
- Japan National Route 476

== United States ==
- Interstate 476
- Maryland Route 476
- Louisiana Highway 476
- Pennsylvania Route 476 (former)
- Puerto Rico Highway 476
- Tennessee State Route 476

Preceded by 475	Lists of highways 476	Succeeded by 477
