= 1973 in spaceflight =

Orbital launches
- First: 8 January
- Last: 29 December

1973 in spaceflight

1973 saw the launch of the first American Space station known as Skylab on a Saturn V rocket.

== Launches ==
- ← Jan
- Feb
- Mar
- Apr
- May
- Jun
- Jul
- Aug
- Sep
- Oct
- Nov
- Dec →

Date and time (UTC)	Rocket	Flight number	Launch site		LSP	
Date and time (UTC)	Payload (⚀ = CubeSat)	Operator	Orbit	Function	Decay (UTC)	Outcome
Date and time (UTC)	Remarks					
=== January ===
8 January; 06:55	(Soviet Union) Proton-K		(Soviet Union) Baikonur Site 81			
8 January; 06:55	(Soviet Union) Luna 21/Lunokhod 2	MOM	Selenocentric	Lunar rover	15 January 1973 (At Moon)	Successful
11 January; 10:00	(Soviet Union) Voskhod (R-7 11A57)		(Soviet Union) Baikonur			
11 January; 10:00	(Soviet Union) Kosmos 543 (Zenit 4M)	MOM	Low Earth	Reconnaissance	24 January 1973	Successful
20 January; 03:36	(Soviet Union) Kosmos-3M (R-14 11K65M)		(Soviet Union) Plesetsk Site 132			
20 January; 03:36	(Soviet Union) Kosmos 544 (Tselina-O)	MO SSSR	Low Earth	ELINT	15 June 1980	Successful
24 January; 11:44	(Soviet Union) Kosmos-2I (R-12 11K63)		(Soviet Union) Plesetsk Site 132			
24 January; 11:44	(Soviet Union) Kosmos 545 (DS-P1-Yu)	MO SSSR	Low Earth	Radar calibration	31 July 1973	Successful
26 January; 11:44	(Soviet Union) Kosmos-3M (R-14 11K65M)		(Soviet Union) Kapustin Yar Site 107			
26 January; 11:44	(Soviet Union) Kosmos 546 (Zaliv mockup)	MO SSSR	Low Earth	Boilerplate	In orbit	Successful
=== February ===
1 February; 08:30	(Soviet Union) Voskhod (R-7 11A57)		(Soviet Union) Baikonur			
1 February; 08:30	(Soviet Union) Kosmos 547 (Zenit 2M)	MOM	Low Earth	Reconnaissance	13 February 1973	Successful
3 February; 05:48	(Soviet Union) Molniya-M (R-7 8K78M)		(Soviet Union) Baikonur			
3 February; 05:48	(Soviet Union) Molniya 1-23	MOM	Molniya	Communication	23 October 1977	Successful
8 February; 13:15	(Soviet Union) Voskhod (R-7 11A57)		(Soviet Union) Plesetsk			
8 February; 13:15	(Soviet Union) Kosmos 548 (Zenit 4M)	MOM	Low Earth	Reconnaissance	21 February 1973	Successful
15 February; 01:11	(Soviet Union) Molniya-M (R-7 8K78M)		(Soviet Union) Baikonur Site 31/6			
15 February; 01:11	(Soviet Union) Prognoz-3	MOM	Molniya	Solar flare detection	31 December 1976	Successful
26 February; 04:37	(Soviet Union) Kosmos-3M (R-14 11K65M)		(Soviet Union) Plesetsk Site 132			
26 February; 04:37	(Soviet Union) Kosmos 549 (Tselina-O)	MO SSSR	Low Earth	ELINT	29 June 1980	Successful
=== March ===
1 March; 12:40	(Soviet Union) Voskhod (R-7 11A57)		(Soviet Union) Plesetsk			
1 March; 12:40	(Soviet Union) Kosmos 550 (Zenit 4MK)	MOM	Low Earth	Reconnaissance	11 March 1973	Successful
6 March; 09:20	(Soviet Union) Voskhod (R-7 11A57)		(Soviet Union) Baikonur			
6 March; 09:20	(Soviet Union) Kosmos 551 (Zenit 4M)	MOM	Low Earth	Reconnaissance	20 March 1973	Successful
6 March; 09:30	(United States) Atlas SLV-3A Agena-D		(United States) Cape Canaveral SLC-13			
6 March; 09:30	(United States) Rhyolite 2	US Air Force	Geosynchronous	ELINT	In orbit	Successful
9 March; 21:00	(United States) Titan IIID		(United States) Vandenberg SLC-4E			
9 March; 21:00	(United States) KH-9	NRO / CIA	Low Earth	Reconnaissance	17 March 1973	Successful
20 March; 11:20	(Soviet Union) Vostok-2M (R-7 8A92M)		(Soviet Union) Plesetsk			
20 March; 11:20	(Soviet Union) Meteor 1-14	MOM	Low Earth	Weather	In orbit	Successful
22 March; 10:00	(Soviet Union) Voskhod (R-7 11A57)		(Soviet Union) Plesetsk			
22 March; 10:00	(Soviet Union) Kosmos 552 (Zenit 2M)	MOM	Low Earth	Reconnaissance	3 April 1973	Successful
22 March; 10:00	(Soviet Union) Nauka	MOM	Low Earth	Technology	9 April 1973	Successful
=== April ===
3 April; 09:00	(Soviet Union) Proton-K		(Soviet Union) Baikonur Site 81			
3 April; 09:00	(Soviet Union) Salyut 2 (Almaz)	MOM	Low Earth	Space Station	28 May 1973	Spacecraft failure
3 April; 09:00	Depressurised before crew launch could occur					
5 April; 11:11	(Soviet Union) Molniya-M (R-7 8K78M)		(Soviet Union) Plesetsk			
5 April; 11:11	(Soviet Union) Molniya 2-5	MOM	Molniya	Communications	6 January 1979	Successful
6 April; 02:11	(United States) Atlas SLV-3D Centaur		(United States) Cape Canaveral SLC-36B			
6 April; 02:11	(United States) Pioneer 11 (Pioneer G)	NASA	Heliocentric to Solar escape	Planetary probe	In orbit	Successful
6 April; 02:11	First spacecraft to visit Saturn; Maiden flight of Atlas SLV-3D Centaur rocket.					
12 April; 11:49	(Soviet Union) Kosmos-2I (R-12 11K63)		(Soviet Union) Plesetsk Site 133			
12 April; 11:49	(Soviet Union) Kosmos 553 (DS-P1-Yu)	MO SSSR	Low Earth	Radar calibration	11 November 1973	Successful
19 April; 08:59	(Soviet Union) Voskhod (R-7 11A57)		(Soviet Union) Plesetsk			
19 April; 08:59	(Soviet Union) Kosmos 554 (Zenit 4MK)	MOM	Low Earth	Reconnaissance	7 May 1973	Successful
19 April; 08:59	Destroyed in orbit after deactivation					
19 April; 10:19	(Soviet Union) Kosmos-2I (R-12 11K63)		(Soviet Union) Kapustin Yar Site 86			
19 April; 10:19	(Soviet Union) (Poland) Interkosmos 9 (Kopernik 500)	Interkosmos	Low Earth	Solar radiation detection	In orbit	Successful
20 April; 23:47	(United States) Delta 1914		(United States) Cape Canaveral SLC-17B			
20 April; 23:47	(United States) Anik A2	Telesat	Geosynchronous	Communications	In orbit	Successful
25 April	(Soviet Union) Tsyklon-2		(Soviet Union) Baikonur Site 90			
25 April	(Soviet Union) US-A	MO SSSR	Intended: Low Earth	Ocean surveillance	25 April 1973	Failure
25 April	Engine failure					
25 April; 10:45	(Soviet Union) Voskhod (R-7 11A57)		(Soviet Union) Plesetsk			
25 April; 10:45	(Soviet Union) Kosmos 555 (Zenit 2M)	MOM	Low Earth	Reconnaissance	7 May 1973	Successful
25 April; 10:45	(Soviet Union) Nauka	MOM	Low Earth	Scientific research	9 May 1973	Successful
=== May ===
5 May; 07:00	(Soviet Union) Voskhod (R-7 11A57)		(Soviet Union) Plesetsk			
5 May; 07:00	(Soviet Union) Kosmos 556 (Zenit 4MK)	MOM	Low Earth	Reconnaissance	14 May 1973	Successful
11 May; 00:20	(Soviet Union) Proton-K		(Soviet Union) Baikonur Site 81			
11 May; 00:20	(Soviet Union) Kosmos 557 (Salyut / Zarya)	MOM	Low Earth	Space Station	22 May 1973	Failure
11 May; 00:20	Loss of control in orbit					
14 May; 17:30	(United States) Saturn V		(United States) Kennedy LC-39A		NASA	
14 May; 17:30	(United States) Skylab	NASA	Low Earth	Space Station	11 July 1979	Successful
14 May; 17:30	First American Space Station; Last flight of the Saturn V rocket Damaged during launch, but repaired					
16 May; 16:40	(United States) Titan IIIB (24B)		(United States) Vandenberg SLC-4W			
16 May; 16:40	(United States) OPS 2093 (KH-8)	NRO / US Air Force	Low Earth	Reconnaissance	13 June 1973	Successful
17 May; 13:19	(Soviet Union) Kosmos-2I (R-12 11K63)		(Soviet Union) Plesetsk Site 133			
17 May; 13:19	(Soviet Union) Kosmos 558 (DS-P1-Yu)	MOM	Low Earth	Radar calibration	22 December 1973	Successful
18 May; 11:00	(Soviet Union) Soyuz-U (R-7 11A511U)		(Soviet Union) Plesetsk			
18 May; 11:00	(Soviet Union) Kosmos 559 (Zenit-4MK)	MOM	Low Earth	Reconnaissance	23 May 1973	Successful
18 May; 11:00	Maiden flight of Soyuz-U carrier rocket					
21 May; 08:47	(France) Diamant-B		(France) Kourou		SEREB	
21 May; 08:47	(France) Castor	CNES	Intended:Low Earth	Technology	21 May 1973	Failure
21 May; 08:47	(France) Pollux	CNES	Intended:Low Earth	Technology		
21 May; 08:47	Final flight of Diamant-B; Fairing failed to separate					
23 May; 10:30	(Soviet Union) Voskhod (R-7 11A57)		(Soviet Union) Plesetsk			
23 May; 10:30	(Soviet Union) Kosmos 560 (Zenit 4M)	MOM	Low Earth	Reconnaissance	5 June 1973	Successful
24 May; 02:00	(Soviet Union) K63D		(Soviet Union) Vladimirovka test range, near Kapustin Yar			
24 May; 02:00	(Soviet Union) BOR-3 No.301		Suborbital	Re-entry test for Spiral program	22 May	Failure
24 May; 02:00	Subscale model of the Spiral spaceplane. Payload fairing failed at about 5 km altitude. Apogee: 20 km					
25 May	(Soviet Union) Kosmos-3M (R-14 11K65M)		(Soviet Union) Plesetsk Site 132			
25 May	(Soviet Union) Zaliv (Tsiklon)	RVSN	Intended: Low Earth	Navigation	25 May 1973	Failure
25 May	Failed to reach orbit					
25 May; 13:00	(United States) Saturn IB		(United States) Kennedy LC-39B		NASA	
25 May; 13:00	(United States) Apollo CSM-116 (Skylab 2)	NASA	Low Earth, docked to Skylab	Crewed orbital flight	22 June 1973	Successful
25 May; 13:00	Crewed flight with 3 astronauts, first crewed flight to Skylab					
25 May; 13:30	(Soviet Union) Voskhod (R-7 11A57)		(Soviet Union) Plesetsk			
25 May; 13:30	(Soviet Union) Kosmos 561 (Zenit 2M)	MOM	Low Earth	Reconnaissance	6 June 1973	Successful
25 May; 13:30	(Soviet Union) Nauka	MOM	Low Earth	Gamma ray telescope	20 June 1973	Successful
29 May; 10:16	(Soviet Union) Vostok-2M (R-7 8A92M)		(Soviet Union) Plesetsk			
29 May; 10:16	(Soviet Union) Meteor 1-15	MOM	Low Earth	Weather	In orbit	Successful
=== June ===
5 June; 11:26	(Soviet Union) Kosmos-2I (R-12 11K63)		(Soviet Union) Plesetsk Site 133			
5 June; 11:26	(Soviet Union) Kosmos 562 (DS-P1-Yu)	MOM	Low Earth		7 January 1974	Successful
6 June; 11:30	(Soviet Union) Voskhod (R-7 11A57)		(Soviet Union) Plesetsk			
6 June; 11:30	(Soviet Union) Kosmos 563 (Zenit 4M)	MOM	Low Earth	Reconnaissance	18 June 1973	Successful
8 June; 15:50	(Soviet Union) Kosmos-3M (R-14 11K65M)		(Soviet Union) Plesetsk Site 132			
8 June; 15:50	(Soviet Union) Kosmos 564 (Strela)	MO SSSR	Low Earth	Communications	In orbit	Successful
8 June; 15:50	(Soviet Union) Kosmos 565 (Strela)	MO SSSR	Low Earth	Communications	In orbit	Successful
8 June; 15:50	(Soviet Union) Kosmos 566 (Strela)	MO SSSR	Low Earth	Communications	In orbit	Successful
8 June; 15:50	(Soviet Union) Kosmos 567 (Strela)	MO SSSR	Low Earth	Communications	In orbit	Successful
8 June; 15:50	(Soviet Union) Kosmos 568 (Strela)	MO SSSR	Low Earth	Communications	In orbit	Successful
8 June; 15:50	(Soviet Union) Kosmos 569 (Strela)	MO SSSR	Low Earth	Communications	In orbit	Successful
8 June; 15:50	(Soviet Union) Kosmos 570 (Strela)	MO SSSR	Low Earth	Communications	In orbit	Successful
8 June; 15:50	(Soviet Union) Kosmos 571 (Strela)	MO SSSR	Low Earth	Communications	In orbit	Successful
10 June; 10:10	(Soviet Union) Voskhod (R-7 11A57)		(Soviet Union) Baikonur			
10 June; 10:10	(Soviet Union) Kosmos 572 (Zenit 4M)	MOM	Low Earth	Reconnaissance	23 June 1973	Successful
10 June; 14:13	(United States) Delta 1913		(United States) Cape Canaveral SLC-17B			
10 June; 14:13	(United States) Explorer 49 (RAE)	NASA	Selenocentric	Astronomy	In orbit	Successful
12 June; 07:14	(United States) Titan IIIC		(United States) Cape Canaveral SLC-40			
12 June; 07:14	(United States) DSP F-4 (IMEWS 4)	US Air Force	Geosynchronous	Missile early warning	In orbit	Successful
15 June; 06:00	(Soviet Union) Soyuz (R-7 11A511)		(Soviet Union) Baikonur Site 1/5			
15 June; 06:00	(Soviet Union) Kosmos 573 (Soyuz 7K-T)	MOM	Low Earth	Test spacecraft	17 June 1973; 06:01	Successful
20 June; 06:16	(Soviet Union) Kosmos-3M (R-14 11K65M)		(Soviet Union) Plesetsk Site 132			
20 June; 06:16	(Soviet Union) Kosmos 574 (Zaliv/Tsiklon)	MO SSSR	Low Earth	Navigation	In orbit	Successful
21 June; 13:29	(Soviet Union) Voskhod (R-7 11A57)		(Soviet Union) Plesetsk			
21 June; 13:29	(Soviet Union) Kosmos 575 (Zenit 2M)	MOM	Low Earth	Reconnaissance	3 July 1973	Successful
26 June; 01:22	(Soviet Union) Kosmos-3M (R-14 11K65M)		(Soviet Union) Plesetsk Site 132			
26 June; 01:22	(Soviet Union) Tselina-O	RVSN	Intended: Low Earth	SIGINT	Never left ground	Failure
26 June; 01:22	Exploded on pad after fuelling error; 9 killed					
26 June; 17:00	(United States) Titan IIIB (24B)		(United States) Vandenberg SLC-4W			
26 June; 17:00	(United States) OPS 4018 (KH-8)	US Air Force	Intended: Low Earth	Reconnaissance	26 June 1973	Failure
26 June; 17:00	Agena upper stage malfunction; Failed to reach orbit					
27 June; 11:50	(Soviet Union) Soyuz-M (R-7 11A511M)		(Soviet Union) Plesetsk			
27 June; 11:50	(Soviet Union) Kosmos 576 (Zenit-4MT / Orion)	MOM	Low Earth	Reconnaissance	9 July 1973	Successful
=== July ===
4 July	(Soviet Union) Voskhod (R-7 11A57)		(Soviet Union) Plesetsk Site 43			
4 July	(Soviet Union) (Zenit 4M)	MOM	Intended: Low Earth	Reconnaissance	4 July 1973	Failure
11 July; 09:58	(Soviet Union) Molniya-M (R-7 8K78M)		(Soviet Union) Plesetsk			
11 July; 09:58	(Soviet Union) Molniya 2-6	MOM	Molniya	Communication	5 August 1978	Successful
13 July; 20:24	(United States) Titan IIID		(United States) Vandenberg SLC-4E			
13 July; 20:24	(United States) OPS 8261 (KH-9)	NRO / CIA	Low Earth	Reconnaissance	12 October 1973	Successful
16 July; 17:10	(United States) Delta 0300		(United States) Vandenberg SLC-2W			
16 July; 17:10	(United States) ITOS E	NASA / NOAA	Intended: Low Earth	Weather	16 July 1973	Failure
16 July; 17:10	Second stage malfunction					
21 July; 19:30	(Soviet Union) Proton-K		(Soviet Union) Baikonur Site 81			
21 July; 19:30	(Soviet Union) Mars 4	MOM	Intended: Areocentric; Actual: Heliocentric	Mars orbiter	In orbit	Failure
21 July; 19:30	Retro-rockets failed, did not enter Martian orbit					
25 July; 11:30	(Soviet Union) Voskhod (R-7 11A57)		(Soviet Union) Plesetsk			
25 July; 11:30	(Soviet Union) Kosmos 577 (Zenit 4M)	MOM	Low Earth	Reconnaissance	7 August 1973	Successful
25 July; 18:55	(Soviet Union) Proton-K		(Soviet Union) Baikonur Site 81			
25 July; 18:55	(Soviet Union) Mars 5	MOM	Areocentric	Mars orbiter	In orbit	Partial Failure
25 July; 18:55	Computer malfunction a few days after entering Martian orbit					
28 July; 11:10	(United States) Saturn IB		(United States) Kennedy LC-39B		NASA	
28 July; 11:10	(United States) Apollo CSM-117 (Skylab 3)	NASA	Low Earth, docked to Skylab	Crewed orbital flight	25 September 1973	Partial Failure
28 July; 11:10	Crewed flight with 3 astronauts. Thruster malfunction, nearly required rescue mission					
=== August ===
1 August; 14:00	(Soviet Union) Voskhod (R-7 11A57)		(Soviet Union) Plesetsk			
1 August; 14:00	(Soviet Union) Kosmos 578 (Zenit 2M)	MOM	Low Earth	Reconnaissance	13 August 1973	Successful
5 August; 17:45	(Soviet Union) Proton-K		(Soviet Union) Baikonur Site 81			
5 August; 17:45	(Soviet Union) Mars 6	MOM	Heliocentric	Mars lander	12 March 1974	Failure
5 August; 17:45	Disappeared shortly before landing					
8 August; 17:00	(Soviet Union) Proton-K		(Soviet Union) Baikonur Site 81			
8 August; 17:00	(Soviet Union) Mars 7	MOM	Heliocentric	Mars lander	In orbit	Failure
8 August; 17:00	Missed planet due to premature separation					
17 August; 04:49	(United States) Thor-LV2F Burner-2A		(United States) Vandenberg SLC-10W			
17 August; 04:49	(United States) DMSP 5B F-4	US Air Force	Low Earth	Weather	In orbit	Successful
21 August; 12:30	(Soviet Union) Voskhod (R-7 11A57)		(Soviet Union) Plesetsk			
21 August; 12:30	(Soviet Union) Kosmos 579 (Zenit 4M)	MOM	Low Earth	Reconnaissance	3 September 1973	Successful
21 August; 16:07	(United States) Titan IIIB (33B)		(United States) Vandenberg SLC-4W			
21 August; 16:07	(United States) OPS 7724 (Jumpseat 3)	NRO / US Air Force	Molniya	SIGINT	In orbit	Successful
22 August; 11:24	(Soviet Union) Kosmos-2I (R-12 11K63)		(Soviet Union) Plesetsk Site 133			
22 August; 11:24	(Soviet Union) Kosmos 580 (DS-P1-Yu)	MO SSSR	Low Earth		1 April 1974	Successful
23 August; 22:57	(United States) Atlas SLV-3D Centaur		(United States) Cape Canaveral LC-36A			
23 August; 22:57	(United States) Intelsat IV F7	Intelsat	Geosynchronous	Communication	In orbit	Successful
24 August; 10:59	(Soviet Union) Voskhod (R-7 11A57)		(Soviet Union) Baikonur			
24 August; 10:59	(Soviet Union) Kosmos 581 (Zenit 4M)	MOM	Low Earth	Reconnaissance	6 September 1973	Successful
28 August; 10:08	(Soviet Union) Kosmos-3M (R-14 11K65M)		(Soviet Union) Plesetsk Site 132			
28 August; 10:08	(Soviet Union) Kosmos 582 (Tselina-O)	MO SSSR	Low Earth	ELINT	5 September 1980	Successful
30 August; 00:07	(Soviet Union) Molniya-M (R-7 8K78M)		(Soviet Union) Plesetsk			
30 August; 00:07	(Soviet Union) Molniya 1-24	MOM	Molniya	Communication	5 December 1979	Successful
30 August; 10:30	(Soviet Union) Voskhod (R-7 11A57)		(Soviet Union) Baikonur			
30 August; 10:30	(Soviet Union) Kosmos 583 (Zenit 2M)	MOM	Low Earth	Reconnaissance	12 September 1973	Successful
=== September ===
6 September; 10:40	(Soviet Union) Voskhod (R-7 11A57)		(Soviet Union) Plesetsk			
6 September; 10:40	(Soviet Union) Kosmos 584 (Zenit 4M)	MOM	Low Earth	Reconnaissance	20 September 1973	Successful
8 September; 01:50	(Soviet Union) Kosmos-3M (R-14 11K65M)		(Soviet Union) Plesetsk Site 132			
8 September; 01:50	(Soviet Union) Kosmos 585 (Sfera)	MO SSSR	Low Earth		In orbit	Successful
14 September; 00:31	(Soviet Union) Kosmos-3M (R-14 11K65M)		(Soviet Union) Plesetsk Site 132			
14 September; 00:31	(Soviet Union) Kosmos 586 (Tsiklon)	MO SSSR	Low Earth	Navigation	In orbit	Successful
18 September	(China) Feng Bao 1		(China) Jiuquan LA-2B			
18 September	(China) JSSW		Intended: Low Earth	Unknown	18 September	Failure
18 September	First orbital launch of Feng Bao 1.					
21 September; 13:05	(Soviet Union) Soyuz-U (R-7 11A511U)		(Soviet Union) Plesetsk			
21 September; 13:05	(Soviet Union) Kosmos 587 (Zenit 4MK)	MOM	Low Earth	Reconnaissance	4 October 1973	Successful
27 September; 12:18	(Soviet Union) Soyuz (R-7 11A511)		(Soviet Union) Baikonur Site 1/5			
27 September; 12:18	(Soviet Union) Soyuz 12, 2 Cosmonauts	MOM	Low Earth	Crewed orbital flight	29 September 1973	Successful
27 September; 12:18	Return-to-flight after Soyuz 11 incident					
27 September; 17:15	(United States) Titan IIIB (24B)		(United States) Vandenberg SLC-4W			
27 September; 17:15	(United States) OPS 6275 (KH-8)		Low Earth	Reconnaissance	29 October 1973	Successful
=== October ===
2 October; 21:46	(Soviet Union) Kosmos-3M (R-14 11K65M)		(Soviet Union) Plesetsk Site 132			
2 October; 21:46	(Soviet Union) Kosmos 588 (Strela)	MO SSSR	Low Earth	Communication	In orbit	Successful
2 October; 21:46	(Soviet Union) Kosmos 589 (Strela)	MO SSSR	Low Earth	Communication	In orbit	Successful
2 October; 21:46	(Soviet Union) Kosmos 590 (Strela)	MO SSSR	Low Earth	Communication	In orbit	Successful
2 October; 21:46	(Soviet Union) Kosmos 591 (Strela)	MO SSSR	Low Earth	Communication	In orbit	Successful
2 October; 21:46	(Soviet Union) Kosmos 592 (Strela)	MO SSSR	Low Earth	Communication	In orbit	Successful
2 October; 21:46	(Soviet Union) Kosmos 593 (Strela)	MO SSSR	Low Earth	Communication	In orbit	Successful
2 October; 21:46	(Soviet Union) Kosmos 594 (Strela)	MO SSSR	Low Earth	Communication	In orbit	Successful
2 October; 21:46	(Soviet Union) Kosmos 595 (Strela)	MO SSSR	Low Earth	Communication	In orbit	Successful
3 October; 13:00	(Soviet Union) Voskhod (R-7 11A57)		(Soviet Union) Plesetsk			
3 October; 13:00	(Soviet Union) Kosmos 596 (Zenit 2M)	MOM	Low Earth	Reconnaissance	9 October 1973	Failure
3 October; 13:00	(Soviet Union) Nauka	RVSN	Low Earth	Magnetosphere	9 October 1973	Successful
3 October; 13:00	Parachute failed to deploy during recovery					
6 October; 12:30	(Soviet Union) Voskhod (R-7 11A57)		(Soviet Union) Plesetsk			
6 October; 12:30	(Soviet Union) Kosmos 597 (Zenit 4MK)	MOM	Low Earth	Reconnaissance	12 October 1973	Successful
10 October; 10:45	(Soviet Union) Voskhod (R-7 11A57)		(Soviet Union) Plesetsk			
10 October; 10:45	(Soviet Union) Kosmos 598 (Zenit 4M)	MOM	Low Earth	Reconnaissance	16 October 1973	Successful
15 October; 08:45	(Soviet Union) Voskhod (R-7 11A57)		(Soviet Union) Baikonur			
15 October; 08:45	(Soviet Union) Kosmos 599 (Zenit 2M)	MOM	Low Earth	Reconnaissance	28 October 1973	Successful
16 October; 12:00	(Soviet Union) Voskhod (R-7 11A57)		(Soviet Union) Plesetsk			
16 October; 12:00	(Soviet Union) Kosmos 600 (Zenit 4M)	MOM	Low Earth	Reconnaissance	23 October 1973	Successful
16 October; 14:00	(Soviet Union) Kosmos-2I (R-12 11K63)		(Soviet Union) Plesetsk Site 133			
16 October; 14:00	(Soviet Union) Kosmos 601 (DS-P1-Yu)	MO SSSR	Low Earth		15 August 1984	Successful
19 October; 10:26	(Soviet Union) Molniya-M (R-7 8K78M)		(Soviet Union) Plesetsk			
19 October; 10:26	(Soviet Union) Molniya 2-7	MOM	Molniya	Communication	8 July 1983	Successful
20 October; 10:14	(Soviet Union) Voskhod (R-7 11A57)		(Soviet Union) Plesetsk			
20 October; 10:14	(Soviet Union) Kosmos 602 (Zenit 4MK)	MOM	Low Earth	Reconnaissance	29 October 1973	Successful
26 October; 02:26	(United States) Delta 1913		(United States) Cape Canaveral SLC-17B			
26 October; 02:26	(United States) Explorer 50 (IMP)	NASA	High Earth	Magnetosphere	In orbit	Successful
27 October; 11:09	(Soviet Union) Voskhod (R-7 11A57)		(Soviet Union) Plesetsk			
27 October; 11:09	(Soviet Union) Kosmos 603 (Zenit 4M)	MOM	Low Earth	Reconnaissance	9 November 1973	Successful
29 October; 14:00	(Soviet Union) Vostok-2M (R-7 8A92M)		(Soviet Union) Plesetsk			
29 October; 14:00	(Soviet Union) Kosmos 604 (Tselina)	MOM	Low Earth	SIGINT	19 January 1992	Successful
30 October; 00:37	(United States) Scout A-1		(United States) Vandenberg SLC-5		Vought	
30 October; 00:37	(United States) Transit-O 20	US Navy	Low Earth	Navigation	In orbit	Successful
30 October; 00:37	Final flight of Scout A rocket					
30 October; 19:00	(Soviet Union) Kosmos-3M (R-14 11K65M)		(Soviet Union) Plesetsk Site 132			
30 October; 19:00	(Soviet Union) Interkosmos 10 (DS-U2-IK)	Interkosmos	Low Earth	Geophysics	1 July 1977	Successful
31 October; 18:24	(Soviet Union) Soyuz-U (R-7 11A511U)		(Soviet Union) Plesetsk Site 43			
31 October; 18:24	(Soviet Union) Kosmos 605 (Bion 1)	MOM	Low Earth	Biology	22 November 1973	Successful
=== November ===
2 November; 13:01	(Soviet Union) Molniya-M (R-7 8K78M)		(Soviet Union) Plesetsk Site 41			
2 November; 13:01	(Soviet Union) Kosmos 606 (Oko)	MOM	Molniya	Missile Early Warning	In orbit	Successful
3 November; 05:45	(United States) Atlas SLV-3D Centaur		(United States) Cape Canaveral SLC-36B			
3 November; 05:45	(United States) Mariner 10	NASA	Heliocentric	Planetary probe	24 March 1975	Successful
3 November; 05:45	Flybys of Venus and Mercury; First spacecraft to visit Mercury					
6 November; 17:02	(United States) Delta 0300		(United States) Vandenberg SLC-2W		NASA	
6 November; 17:02	(United States) NOAA 3 (ITOS-F)	NASA / NOAA	Low Earth	Weather	In orbit	Successful
6 November; 17:02	Final flight of Delta 0100 series					
10 November; 12:38	(Soviet Union) Voskhod (R-7 11A57)		(Soviet Union) Plesetsk			
10 November; 12:38	(Soviet Union) Kosmos 607 (Zenit 4MK)	MOM	Low Earth	Reconnaissance	22 November 1973	Successful
10 November; 20:09	(United States) Titan IIID		(United States) Vandenberg SLC-4E			
10 November; 20:09	(United States) OPS 6630 (KH-9)	NRO / CIA	Low Earth	Reconnaissance	13 March 1974	Successful
10 November; 20:09	(United States) OPS 7705 (SSF)	NRO / US Air Force	Low Earth	SIGINT	26 December 1978	Successful
10 November; 20:09	(United States) OPS 6630 P/L 2 (SSF)	NRO / US Air Force	Low Earth	SIGINT	In orbit	Successful
14 November; 20:40	(Soviet Union) Molniya-M (R-7 8K78M)		(Soviet Union) Baikonur			
14 November; 20:40	(Soviet Union) Molniya 1-25	MOM	Molniya	Communication	26 May 1979	Successful
16 November; 14:01	(United States) Saturn IB		(United States) Kennedy LC-39B		NASA	
16 November; 14:01	(United States) Apollo CSM-118 (Skylab 4)	NASA	Low Earth, docked to Skylab	Crewed orbital flight	8 February 1974	Successful
16 November; 14:01	Crewed flight with 3 astronauts. Final flight of Skylab programme					
20 November; 12:29	(Soviet Union) Kosmos-2I (R-12 11K63)		(Soviet Union) Plesetsk Site 133			
20 November; 12:29	(Soviet Union) Kosmos 608 (DS-P1-Yu)	MO SSSR	Low Earth	Radar calibration	10 July 1974	Successful
21 November; 10:00	(Soviet Union) Voskhod (R-7 11A57)		(Soviet Union) Baikonur			
21 November; 10:00	(Soviet Union) Kosmos 609 (Zenit-4M)	MOM	Low Earth	Reconnaissance	4 December 1973	Successful
27 November; 00:08	(Soviet Union) Kosmos-3M (R-14 11K65M)		(Soviet Union) Plesetsk Site 132			
27 November; 00:08	(Soviet Union) Kosmos 610 (Tselina-O)	MO SSSR	Low Earth	SIGINT / ELINT	15 September 1980	Successful
28 November; 09:29	(Soviet Union) Kosmos-2I (R-12 11K63)		(Soviet Union) Plesetsk Site 133			
28 November; 09:29	(Soviet Union) Kosmos 611 (DS-P1-Yu)	MO SSSR	Low Earth	Radar calibration	19 June 1974	Successful
28 November; 11:43	(Soviet Union) Voskhod (R-7 11A57)		(Soviet Union) Plesetsk			
28 November; 11:43	(Soviet Union) Kosmos 612 (Zenit 4MK)	MOM	Low Earth	Reconnaissance	11 December 1973	Successful
30 November; 05:20	(Soviet Union) Soyuz (R-7 11A511)		(Soviet Union) Baikonur Site 1/5			
30 November; 05:20	(Soviet Union) Kosmos 613 (Soyuz 7K-T)	MOM	Low Earth	Test spacecraft	29 January 1974; 05:29	Successful
30 November; 13:08	(Soviet Union) Molniya-M (R-7 8K78M)		(Soviet Union) Plesetsk			
30 November; 13:08	(Soviet Union) Molniya 1-26	MOM	Molniya	Communication	9 June 1985	Successful
=== December ===
4 December; 15:00	(Soviet Union) Kosmos-3M (R-14 11K65M)		(Soviet Union) Plesetsk Site 132			
4 December; 15:00	(Soviet Union) Kosmos 614 (Strela)	MO SSSR	Low Earth	Communication	In orbit	Successful
13 December; 11:10	(Soviet Union) Kosmos-2I (R-12 11K63)		(Soviet Union) Plesetsk Site 133			
13 December; 11:10	(Soviet Union) Kosmos 615 (DS-P1-I)	MO SSSR	Low Earth		17 December 1975	Successful
13 December; 23:57	(United States) Titan IIIC		(United States) Cape Canaveral SLC-40			
13 December; 23:57	(United States) DSCS II F-3	US Air Force	Geosynchronous	Communication	1 August 1982	Successful
13 December; 23:57	(United States) DSCS II F-4	US Air Force	Geosynchronous	Communication	20 December 1993	Successful
16 December; 06:18	(United States) Delta 1900		(United States) Vandenberg SLC-2W		NASA	
16 December; 06:18	(United States) Explorer 51 (AE-C)	NASA	Low Earth / Medium Earth	Atmospheric	12 December 1978	Successful
17 December; 12:00	(Soviet Union) Soyuz-M (R-7 11A511M)		(Soviet Union) Plesetsk			
17 December; 12:00	(Soviet Union) Kosmos 616 (Zenit 4MT)	MOM	Low Earth	Reconnaissance	28 December 1973	Successful
18 December; 11:55	(Soviet Union) Soyuz (R-7 11A511)		(Soviet Union) Baikonur Site 1/5			
18 December; 11:55	(Soviet Union) Soyuz 13, 2 Cosmonauts	MOM	Low Earth	Crewed orbital flight	26 December 1973	Successful
18 December; 11:55	Orion 2 Astrophysics / Astronomy					
19 December; 09:43	(Soviet Union) Kosmos-3M (R-14 11K65M)		(Soviet Union) Plesetsk Site 132			
19 December; 09:43	(Soviet Union) Kosmos 617 (Strela)	MO SSSR	Low Earth	Communication	In orbit	Successful
19 December; 09:43	(Soviet Union) Kosmos 618 (Strela)	MO SSSR	Low Earth	Communication	In orbit	Successful
19 December; 09:43	(Soviet Union) Kosmos 619 (Strela)	MO SSSR	Low Earth	Communication	In orbit	Successful
19 December; 09:43	(Soviet Union) Kosmos 620 (Strela)	MO SSSR	Low Earth	Communication	In orbit	Successful
19 December; 09:43	(Soviet Union) Kosmos 621 (Strela)	MO SSSR	Low Earth	Communication	In orbit	Successful
19 December; 09:43	(Soviet Union) Kosmos 622 (Strela)	MO SSSR	Low Earth	Communication	In orbit	Successful
19 December; 09:43	(Soviet Union) Kosmos 623 (Strela)	MO SSSR	Low Earth	Communication	In orbit	Successful
19 December; 09:43	(Soviet Union) Kosmos 624 (Strela)	MO SSSR	Low Earth	Communication	In orbit	Successful
21 December; 12:30	(Soviet Union) Voskhod (R-7 11A57)		(Soviet Union) Plesetsk			
21 December; 12:30	(Soviet Union) Kosmos 625 (Zenit 4MK)	MOM	Low Earth	Reconnaissance	3 January 1974	Successful
25 December; 11:17	(Soviet Union) Molniya-M (R-7 8K78M)		(Soviet Union) Plesetsk			
25 December; 11:17	(Soviet Union) Molniya 2-8	MOM	Molniya	Communication	24 November 1985	Successful
26 December; 16:30	(Soviet Union) Kosmos-3M (R-14 11K65M)		(Soviet Union) Plesetsk Site 132			
26 December; 16:30	(Soviet Union) (France) Aureole 2 (DS-U2-GKA)	MO SSSR / CNES	Low Earth	Auroral research	30 April 1974	Successful
27 December; 20:19	(Soviet Union) Tsyklon-2		(Soviet Union) Baikonur Site 90			
27 December; 20:19	(Soviet Union) Kosmos 626 (US-A / RORSAT)	MO SSSR	Low Earth	Ocean Reconnaissance	22 March 1974	Successful
29 December; 04:12	(Soviet Union) Kosmos-3M (R-14 11K65M)		(Soviet Union) Plesetsk Site 132			
29 December; 04:12	(Soviet Union) Kosmos 627 (Zaliv)	MO SSSR	Low Earth	Navigation	In orbit	Successful

- ← Jan
- Feb
- Mar
- Apr
- May
- Jun
- Jul
- Aug
- Sep
- Oct
- Nov
- Dec →

== Deep Space Rendezvous ==
Date (GMT)	Spacecraft	Event	Remarks
15 January	Luna 21	Delivered Lunokhod 2 between Mare Serenitatis and the Taurus Mountains	
15 June	Explorer 49	Entered Selenocentric orbit	Radio telescope
3 December	Pioneer 10	Flyby of Jupiter	Closest approach: 130,354 kilometres (80,998 mi)

== EVAs ==
Start date/time	Duration	End time	Spacecraft	Crew	Remarks
26 May; 00:40	40 minutes	01:20	CM-116; SLM-1	(United States) Paul J. Weitz	Using a 10-foot (3.0 m) long tool, Weitz stood in the open hatch of the Command Module (as Joe Kerwin held onto his legs) and tried to remove a strap preventing the release of a solar panel on Skylab.
7 June; 15:15	3 hours 25 minutes	18:40	Skylab; SLM-1	(United States) Pete Conrad (United States) Joseph P. Kerwin	Used long-handled cable cutters to remove debris that prevented the solar array system from deploying and then forced the solar array system to deploy, providing the Skylab with electrical power needed to operate.
19 June; 10:55	1 hour 36 minutes	12:31	Skylab; SLM-1	(United States) Pete Conrad (United States) Paul J. Weitz	Replaced exposed film cassettes with fresh film and repaired an electrical contact.
6 August; 17:30	6 hours 31 minutes	7 August; 00:01	Skylab; SLM-2	(United States) Owen K. Garriott (United States) Jack R. Lousma	Erected a twin-pole solar shield to improve temperature control in Skylab, replaced film cassettes in the solar observatory and installed micrometeoroid detection panels.
24 August; 16:24	4 hours 31 minutes	20:55	Skylab; SLM-2	(United States) Owen K. Garriott (United States) Jack R. Lousma	Installed a new gyroscope selection box, and replaced the film in the solar observatory.
22 September; 11:18	2 hours 41 minutes	13:59	Skylab; SLM-2	(United States) Owen K. Garriott (United States) Alan Bean	Replaced the film on the solar observatory and collected the Thermal Coatings Experiment Panel for return to Earth.
22 November; 17:42	6 hours 33 minutes	23 November; 00:15	Skylab; SLM-3	(United States) Edward Gibson (United States) William R. Pogue	Replaced the film on the solar observatory and repaired the antenna for the Earth resources experiment package.
25 December; 16:00	7 hours 1 minute	23:01	Skylab; SLM-3	(United States) Gerald P. Carr (United States) William R. Pogue	Used the extreme ultraviolet electronographic camera and the coronagraph contamination camera to photograph Comet Kohoutek. They also replaced the film on the solar observatory.
29 December; 17:00	3 hours 29 minutes	20:29	Skylab; SLM-3	(United States) Gerald P. Carr (United States) Edward Gibson	Photographed Comet Kohoutek as it appeared from behind the Sun and recovered the Thermal Control Coatings Experiment panel.
