= List of highways numbered 478 =

The following highways are numbered 478:

== Australia ==
- Back Beach Road

== Canada ==
- Manitoba Provincial Road 478

== Japan ==
- Japan National Route 478

== United States ==
- Interstate 478 (unsigned designation for the Brooklyn–Battery Tunnel)
- County Road 478 (Sumter County, Florida)
  - County Road 478A (Sumter County, Florida)
- Louisiana Highway 478
- Maryland Route 478
- New Mexico State Road 478
- Pennsylvania Route 478
- Puerto Rico Highway 478
- Farm to Market Road 478 (Texas)
- Texas State Highway Loop 478

Preceded by 477	Lists of highways 478	Succeeded by 479
