= Interstate 685 =

Interstate 685 may refer to:

- Interstate 685 (Alabama), a planned future designation for a current stretch of I-85 in Montgomery, Alabama
- Interstate 685 (North Carolina), a planned future Interstate Highway following US 421 between I-40 in Greensboro, North Carolina, and I-95 near Fayetteville, North Carolina
- Interstate 685 (South Carolina), a designation for I-85 Business once proposed by civic leaders in Spartanburg, South Carolina
