= Interstate 675 =

Interstate 675 may refer to:

- Interstate 675 (Georgia), a connection south of Atlanta, Georgia
- Interstate 675 (Michigan), a loop through Saginaw, Michigan
- Interstate 675 (Ohio), a partial bypass of Dayton, Ohio
