= Interstate 335 =

Interstate 335 may refer to:

- Interstate 335 (Iowa), a designation once proposed by city leaders in Carlisle and Des Moines, Iowa for the Des Moines Bypass
- Interstate 335 (Kansas), a spur to Topeka, Kansas and designation for part of the Kansas Turnpike
- Interstate 335 (Minnesota), a never-built spur in Minneapolis, Minnesota
- Interstate 335 (Oklahoma), the designation for the Kickapoo Turnpike
