= Interstate 670 =

Interstate 670 may refer to:

- Interstate 670 (Kansas–Missouri), a connector highway within Kansas City
- Interstate 670 (Ohio), a spur highway connecting Columbus, Ohio, to Gahanna, Ohio
