= MAZ-215 =

Low-floor bus from MAZ

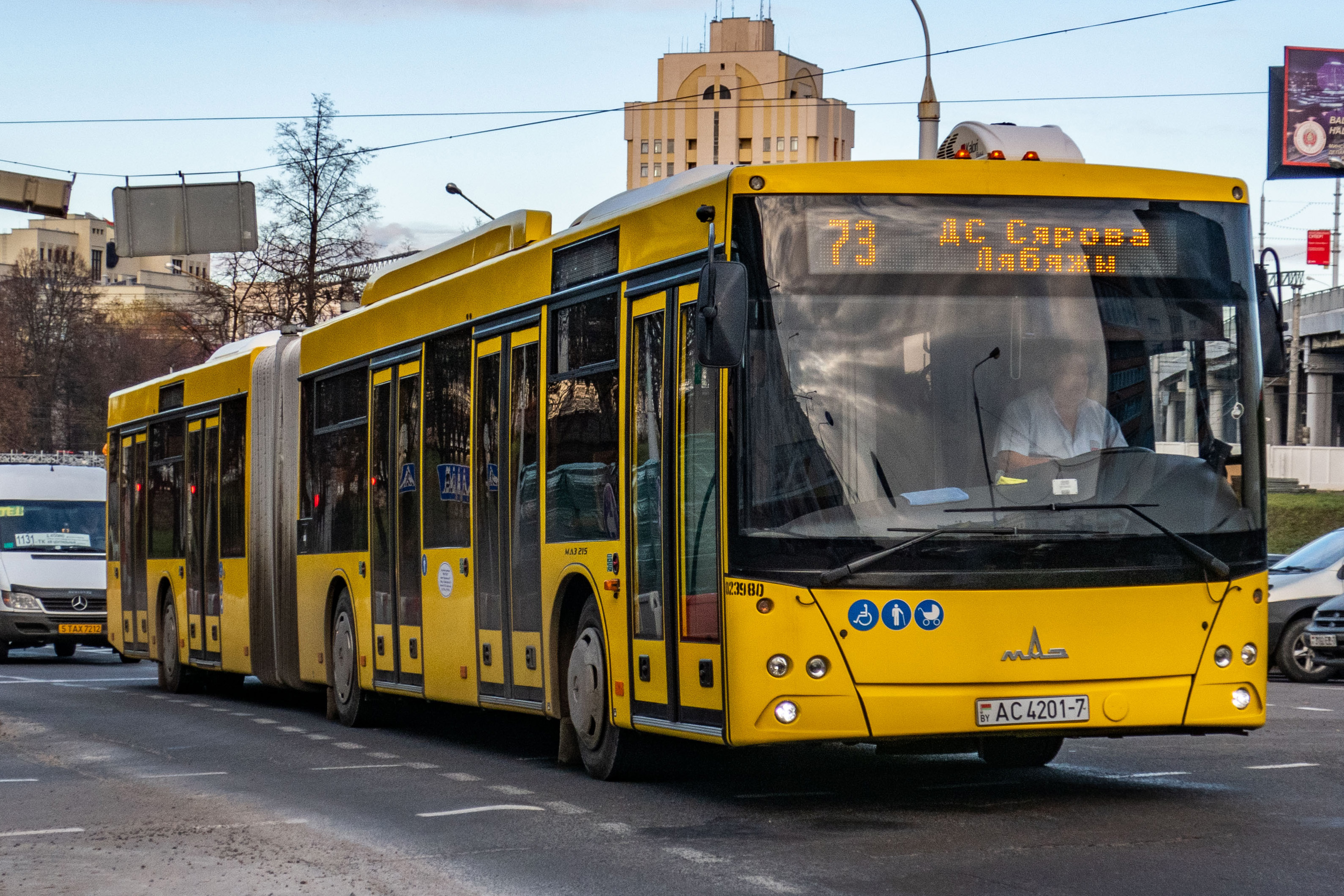
- five-door MAZ-215 in Minsk

Overview
- Manufacturer: MAZ
- Production: 2014–present
- Assembly: Minsk, Belarus (MAZ)

Body and chassis
- Class: Articulated city-bus
- Doors: 5
- Floor type: Low floor

Powertrain
- Engine: Mercedes-Benz OM 926LA (Euro 5)
- Capacity: 38 - 40 seats
- Transmission: ZF 6HP604C, 6-speed automatic transmission

Dimensions
- Length: 18,750 mm (738.2 in)
- Width: 2,550 mm (100.4 in)
- Height: 3,350 mm (131.9 in)
- Curb weight: 16,600 kg (36,597 lb)

Chronology
- Predecessor: MAZ-105

The MAZ-215 is a Belarusian low-floor articulated bus from the Minsk Automobile Plant. The vehicle is an articulated bus with a driven central axle and corresponding to a drive formula of 6 × 2 (2). It is the successor of the MAZ-205.

== Vehicle Description ==
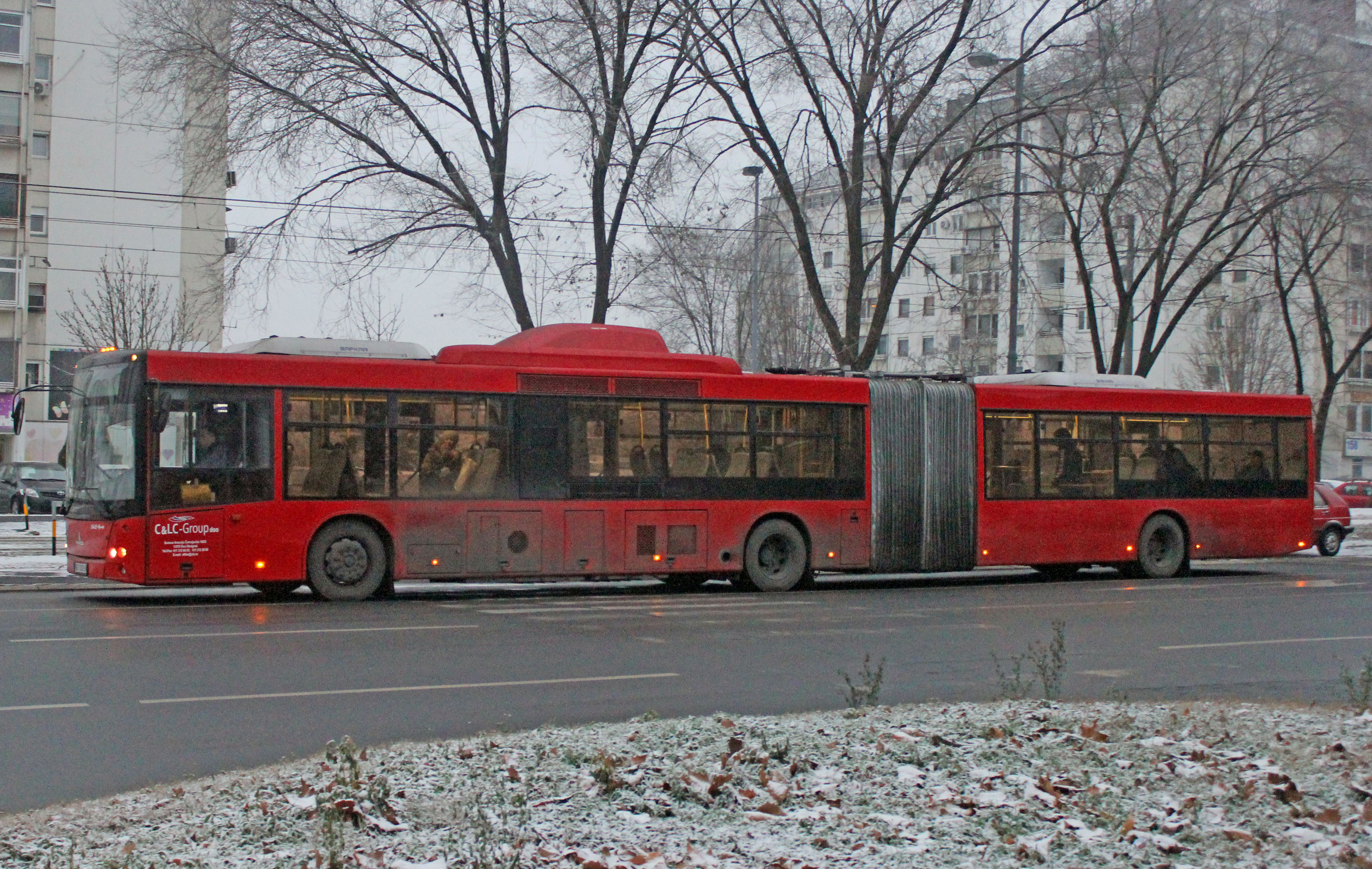
MAZ-215 in Belgrade (2016)

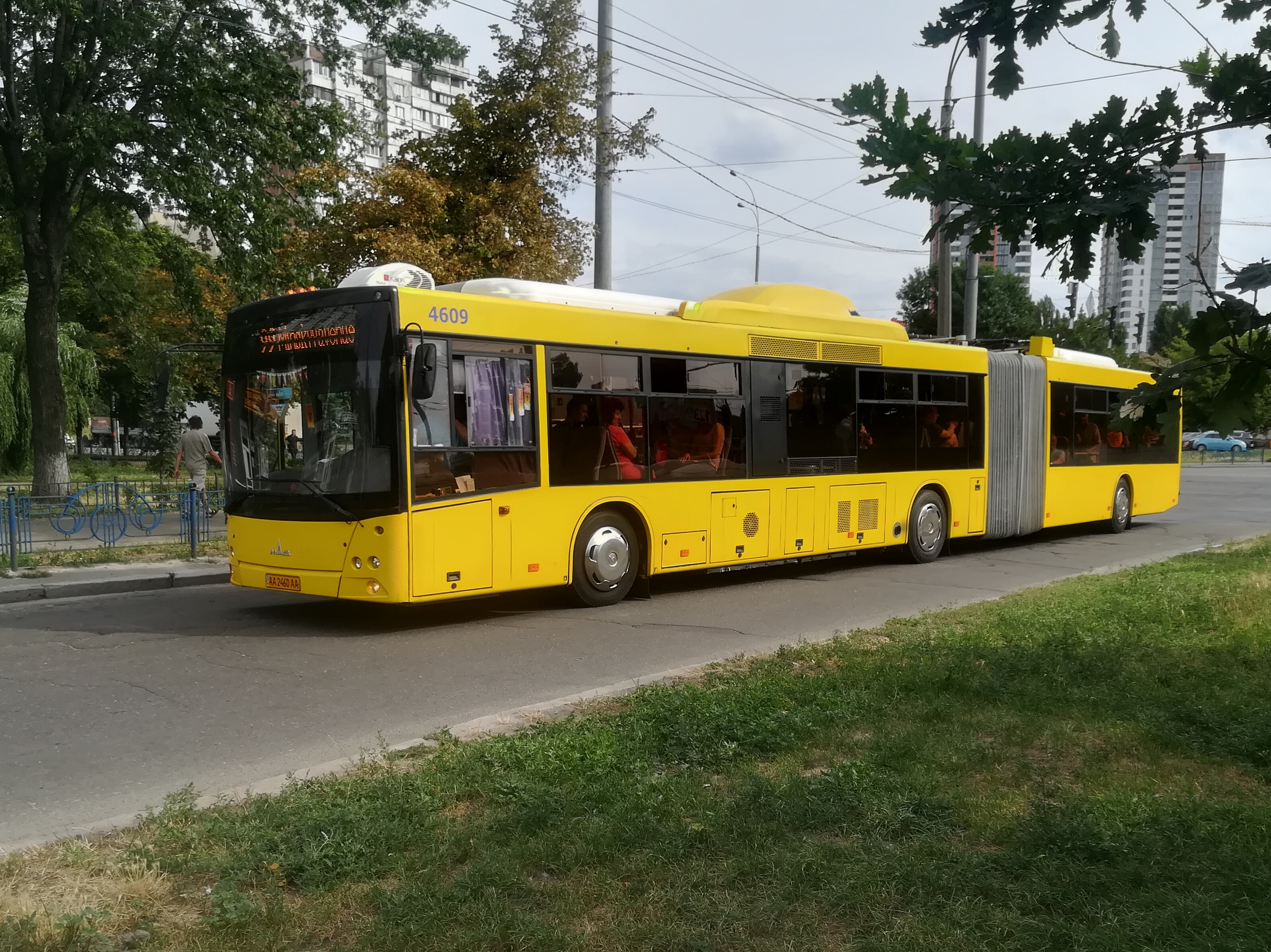
MAZ-215 in Kyiv (2019)

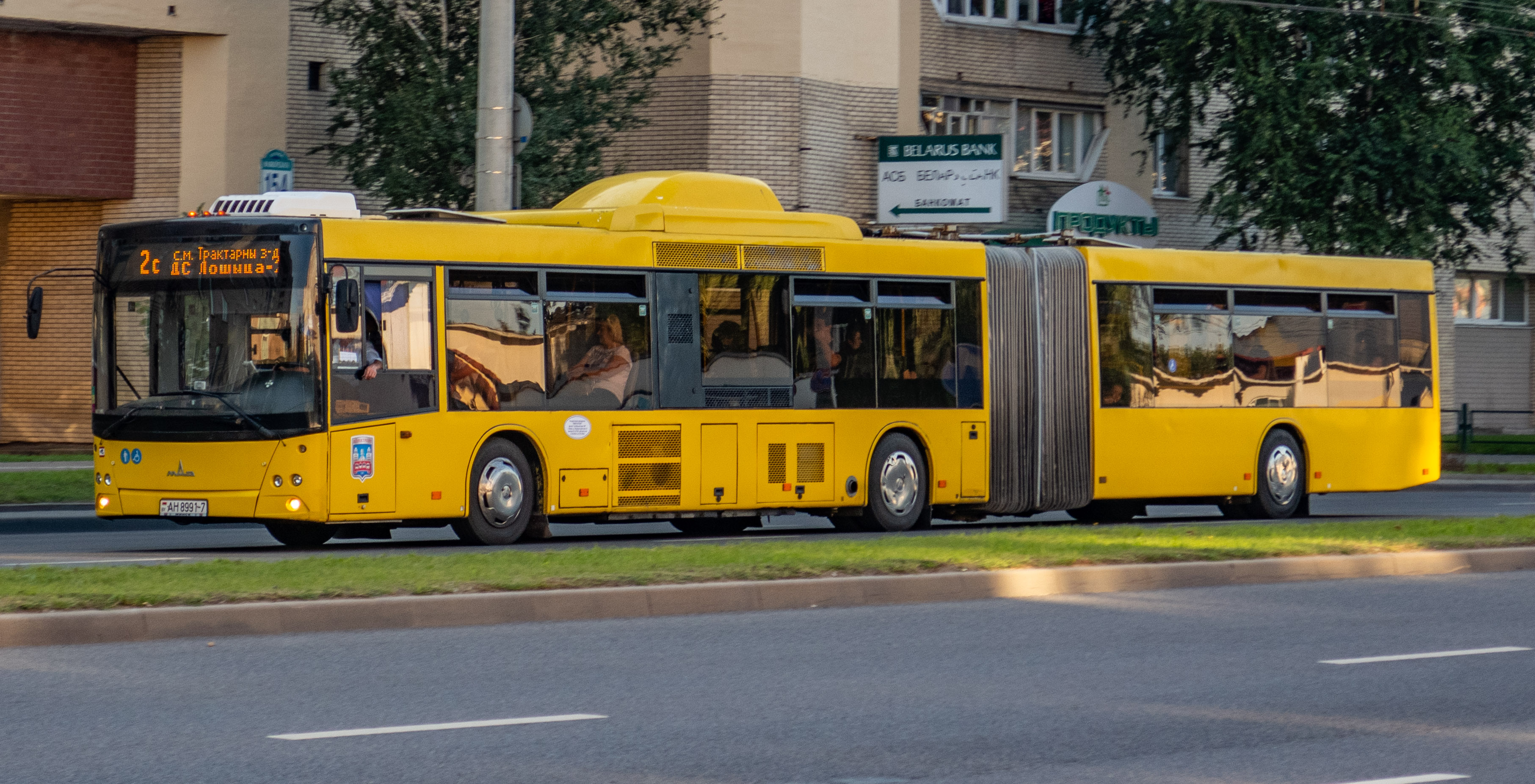
Side view of a MAZ-215 in Minsk. Good to notice: The hump on the roof over the engine (2019)

The MAZ-215 is the successor of the similar MAZ-205 and was developed in 2014 on the occasion of the ice hockey world championship for men taking place in Minsk in order to transport the fans to the stadiums. Depending on the configuration, the buses are designed for around 170 passengers with 40 seats. Many parts and features have been adopted from the predecessor. From the design as an articulated bus to the gearbox and engine to various chassis parts. The body parts were taken over as far as possible from the smaller MAZ-203 and MAZ-206. They consist of galvanized sheet steel, aluminum and also of fiber plastic. The front glued to the frame is completely identical to that of other buses from the same series.

Many of the vehicle's components are purchased from Western manufacturers. The six-cylinder in-line diesel engine comes from Mercedes-Benz in all versions and is designed for a mileage of 1.5 million kilometers. The automatic transmission is produced by ZF Friedrichshafen. The components of the brake system are supplied by Knorr-Bremse, the bus has ABS, ESP and Traction control system. The front wheels are connected to the frame of the vehicle via an Independent suspension, the two rear axles are designed as rigid axles. Air suspension in combination with hydraulic shock absorbers was installed on all axles. The entire chassis has been designed so that it is also suitable for poor road conditions.

Technical changes compared to the previous model were mainly made in the area of the engine compartment. As with its predecessors, this is located in a separate compartment in the front passenger compartment. In this way, the joint that connects both vehicle parts can be kept simple, since no drive force has to be transmitted. In order to reduce the space required inside the vehicle, the cooling system and some expansion tanks have been moved to the vehicle roof in the characteristic bulge. The downsized tank was moved to the rear of the vehicle. There is also the option of ordering the MAZ-215 with five instead of just four passenger doors. The bus driver's workplace has also been revised. The seating can be arranged in four different ways.

When launched, the MAZ-215 was the largest articulated bus built by MAZ and the largest bus built in the former CIS, and cost approximately 10 million ruble (then approximately 148,000 €). By early 2020 at least 330 copies had been made. Five-door buses are used frequently in Minsk and Gomel, and several buses are used in Baranavichy, Bobruisk, Brest, Pinsk and other Belarusian cities. Many buses were sold to Mongolia (20 buses to Ulan Bator), to Russia (St. Petersburg), Serbia (Belgrade), to Ukraine (Kyiv, Odesa, exported from autumn 2019 Mariupol). Based on the MAZ-215 the trolleybus MAZ-215T was developed for the vehicle. In addition, the otherwise very similar MAZ-216 exists as a pusher articulated bus.

== Literature ==
- Minski Awtomobilny Sawod: Автобусы МАЗ-215. Руководство по эксплуатации. self-published, Minsk 2017, operating manual for MAZ-105 in russian language.
