= C215 Viaduct =

- Carries: High speed trains
- Locale: Taiwan
- Official name: C215 Viaduct

Characteristics
- Design: Box girder
- Total length: 20,000 meters (66,000 ft)

History
- Opened: 2005

C215 Viaduct is a 20,000-meter (66,000-foot) long box girder bridge completed in 2003, with a cost of around US$40 million. It is located in Taiwan and is part of the Taiwan High Speed Rail network.

== See also ==
- Transportation in Taiwan
