= Kosmos 580 =

Soviet radar calibration satellite

- Mission type: ABM radar target
- COSPAR ID: 1973-057A
- SATCAT no.: 06793

Spacecraft properties
- Spacecraft type: DS-P1-Yu
- Manufacturer: Yuzhnoye
- Launch mass: 400 kilograms (880 lb)

Start of mission
- Launch date: 22 August 1973, 11:24:55 UTC
- Rocket: Kosmos-2I 63SM
- Launch site: Plesetsk 133/1

End of mission
- Decay date: 1 April 1974

Orbital parameters
- Reference system: Geocentric
- Regime: Low Earth
- Perigee altitude: 268 kilometres (167 mi)
- Apogee altitude: 472 kilometres (293 mi)
- Inclination: 71 degrees
- Period: 91.9 minutes

Kosmos 580 (Russian: Космос 580 meaning Cosmos 580), known before launch as DS-P1-Yu No.59, was a Soviet satellite which was launched in 1973 as part of the Dnepropetrovsk Sputnik programme. It was a 400-kilogram (880 lb) spacecraft, which was built by the Yuzhnoye Design Bureau, and was used as a radar calibration target for anti-ballistic missile tests.

== Launch ==
Kosmos 580 was successfully launched into low Earth orbit at 11:24:55 UTC on 22 August 1973. The launch took place from Site 133/1 at the Plesetsk Cosmodrome, and used a Kosmos-2I 63SM carrier rocket.

== Orbit ==
Upon reaching orbit, the satellite was assigned its Kosmos designation, and received the International Designator 1973-057A. The North American Aerospace Defense Command assigned it the catalogue number 06793.

Kosmos 580 was the sixty-fourth of seventy nine DS-P1-Yu satellites to be launched, and the fifty-eighth of seventy two to successfully reach orbit. It was operated in an orbit with a perigee of 268 kilometres (167 mi), an apogee of 472 kilometres (293 mi), 71 degrees of inclination, and an orbital period of 91.9 minutes. It remained in orbit until it decayed and reentered the atmosphere on 1 April 1974.

== See also ==
- 1973 in spaceflight
