= New Avio C205 =

C205
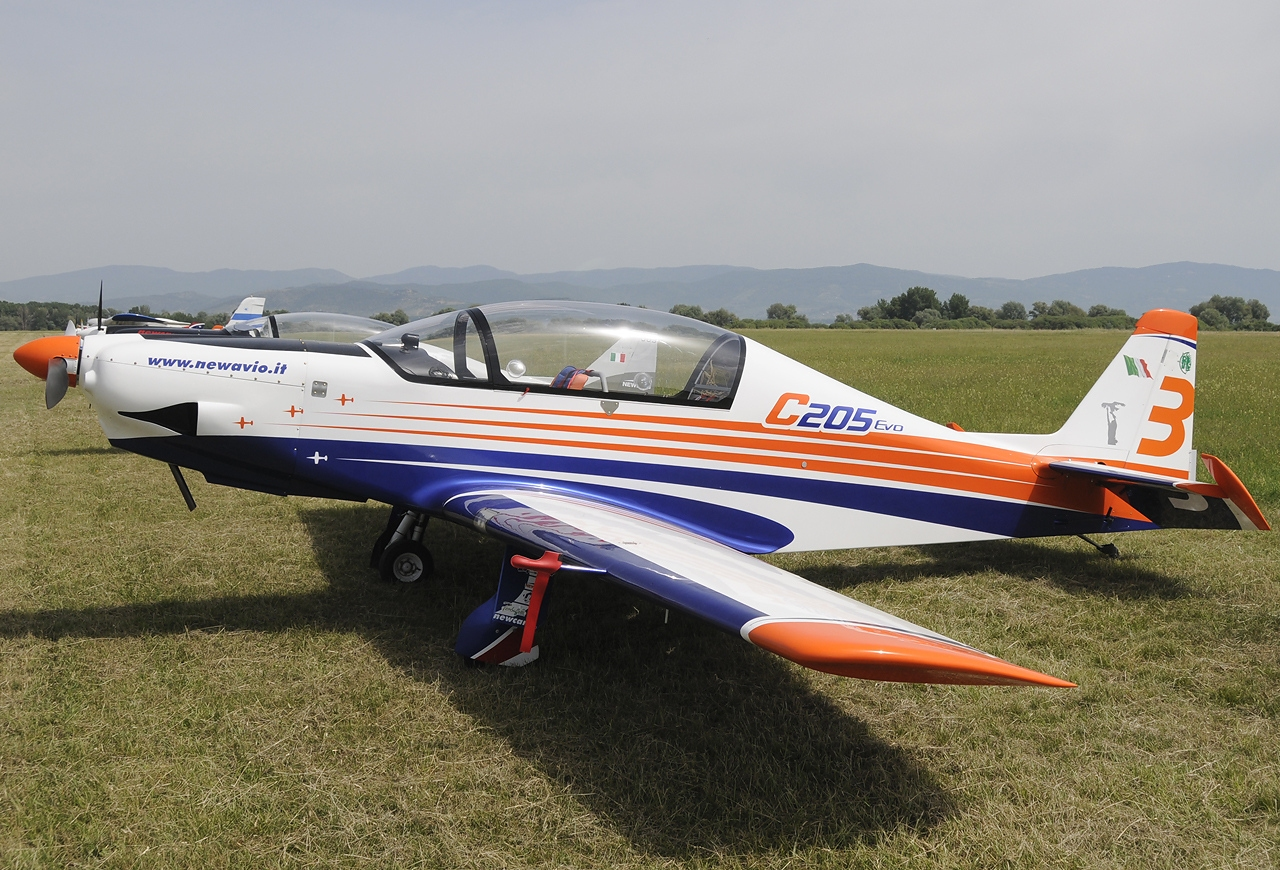

General information
- Type: Two seat ultralight aircraft
- National origin: Italy
- Manufacturer: New Avio, Gruppo NewCar, Trevi
- Status: Lits in production

The New Avio C205 is an aerobatic ultralight aircraft, seating two in tandem and produced by New Avio, Gruppo NewCar of Italy.

== Design and development ==
The C205 is a low wing, single engine aircraft with a retractable conventional undercarriage. It has a wooden structure with a mixture of wood and carbon composite skinning. The low, trapezoidal wings, built around two spars, are entirely wooden apart from Kevlar reinforced leading edges. They have Hoerner-type tips; the trailing edge carries ailerons and electrically driven flaps. The main undercarriage legs are attached to the main spar and have a track of 2.23 m (7 ft 4 in). The main gear is retracted hydroelectrically; the tailwheel is fixed.

The fuselage has a wooden structure, reinforced with steel plates and roll-bar, and tapers to the rear. The fin and rudder are straight edged, tapered and swept; the rudder and elevators are all horn balanced. A long, single piece canopy covers both seats, with a separate windscreen. Ahead, the engine is under a polycarbonate cowling: the standard power plant is a 60 kW (80 hp) Rotax 912 UL flat four, driving a variable-pitch propeller with a choice of two or three blades.

The C205 can be built from kits, with two levels of pre-completion.

== Operational history ==
By mid-2010 there were at least four C205s on the European registers, all Italian. Three of these have been used by the aeroclub at Trevi, where New Avio is based. They have been flown by the three-man Walter's Bad aerobatic team.

== Variants ==
C205
Original model
C205 Evo
Flying by 2007

== Specifications (Evo) ==
Data from Jane's All the World's Aircraft 2010/11

General characteristics

- Capacity: 2
- Length: 7.10 m (23 ft 4 in)
- Wingspan: 8.30 m (27 ft 3 in)
- Height: 1.78 m (5 ft 10 in)
- Powerplant: 1 × Rotax 912 ULS 4-cylinder horizontally opposed, 73.5 kW (98.6 hp)
- Propellers: 2-bladed (3-blade option)

Performance

- Maximum speed: 260 km/h (160 mph, 140 kn)
- Cruise speed: 230 km/h (140 mph, 120 kn)
- Stall speed: 65 km/h (40 mph, 35 kn) flaps down
- Never exceed speed: 350 km/h (220 mph, 190 kn)
- Endurance: 5.5 h
- g limits: +6/-6
