= USS Shada =

Patrol vessel of the United States Navy

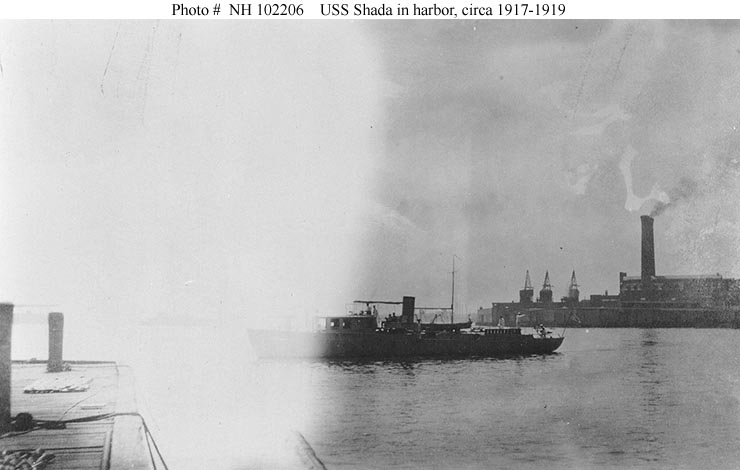
- A damaged photograph of USS Shada (SP-580) sometime between 1917 and 1919.

History

United States
- Name: USS Shada
- Namesake: Previous name retained
- Builder: George Lawley & Son, Neponset, Massachusetts
- Completed: 1908
- Acquired: 3 or 28 April 1917
- Commissioned: 3 April or 22 May 1917
- Decommissioned: 2 December 1918
- Fate: Returned to owner 23 April 1919
- Notes: Operated as motorboat Shada 1908-1917 and from 1919

General characteristics
- Type: Patrol vessel
- Tonnage: 66 gross register tons
- Length: 96 ft (29 m)
- Beam: 15 ft 4 in (4.67 m)
- Draft: 4 ft 6 in (1.37 m)
- Speed: 10.5 knots
- Complement: 14
- Armament: 1 × 3-pounder gun; 1 × 1-pounder gun

USS Shada (SP-580) was a United States Navy patrol vessel in commission from 1917 to 1918.

Shada was built as a private motorboat of the same name in 1908 by George Lawley & Son at Neponset, Massachusetts. On either 3 or 28 April 1917, her owner, Mrs. G. W. Sortwell of Boston, Massachusetts, loaned her to the U.S. Navy for use as a section patrol vessel during World War I. She was commissioned on either 3 April or 22 May 1917 as USS Shada (SP-580).

Presumably assigned to the 1st Naval District in northern New England, Shada patrolled in Boston Harbor and along the New Hampshire and Maine coasts for the rest of World War I.

Shada was decommissioned on 2 December 1918 and returned to her owner on 23 April 1919.
