= Interstate 475 =

Interstate 475 may refer to:

- Interstate 475 (Georgia), a bypass of Macon, Georgia
- Interstate 475 (Michigan), a bypass of Flint, Michigan
- Interstate 475 (Ohio), a bypass of Toledo, Ohio
- Interstate 475 (Tennessee), a proposed Interstate Highway that was cancelled in the Knoxville area
