= Tennessee State Route 475 =

Former proposed highway in Tennessee

Knoxville Parkway
- Orange Route

Route information
- Maintained by Tennessee Department of Transportation (TDOT)
- Status: Cancelled
- Existed: 1990s–2010

Major junctions
- South end: I-40 / I-75 near Lenoir City
- US 25W near Powell
- North end: I-75 northwest of Heiskell

Location
- Country: United States
- State: Tennessee

Highway system
- Interstate Highway System; Main; Auxiliary; Suffixed; Business; Future; Tennessee State Routes; Interstate; US; State
← SR 474	→ SR 476

Interstate 475 (I-475)/State Route 475 (SR 475), officially known as the Knoxville Parkway and commonly known as the Orange Route, was a proposed Interstate Highway and state route in Loudon, Knox, Anderson, Grainger, Jefferson and Sevier counties within the eastern part of the U.S. state of Tennessee. The proposed route would have allowed through traffic on I-75 to bypass the Knoxville-Knox County urbanized area. If constructed, SR 475 was to begin at the I-40/I-75 junction near Farragut, and travel northeast through the communities of Hardin Valley, Solway and Claxton, then join I-75 again northwest of Heiskell. It was also considered to be extended to I-40 at exit 407, serving as a northern semi-beltway in the Knoxville area. Driven by opposition spearheaded by state representative H.E. Bittle of Hardin Valley and Knoxville mayor Victor Ashe, the project was scrapped by the Tennessee Department of Transportation (TDOT) in 2010.

== Route description ==
I-475/SR 475 was proposed as a four-lane divided highway with full access control and a 70 mph (110 km/h) design speed per Interstate design standards. Upon completion, this route was expected to be added into the National Highway System, and would have also been designated as a Tennessee Scenic Parkway. This route was also being studied by TDOT as a potential toll road, and may have been planned to be extended to I-40 near exit 407 in Sevierville, replacing the bypass designation of I-640.

== History ==
With the idea originally conceived in the mid 1990s, the Knoxville Parkway was dubbed the Orange Route in local press, prominently the Knoxville News Sentinel. The route was cancelled on June 25, 2010, due to changing traffic needs and high design and construction costs. The "no build" option was selected because projections showed that it would divert less traffic from I-40/I-75 than previously expected, and the estimated one billion dollar expense was deemed prohibitive.
