= Interstate 110 =

Interstate 110 may refer to:

- Interstate 110 (California), a north–south freeway running through Los Angeles, California
- Interstate 110 (Florida), a spur route in Pensacola, Florida
- Interstate 110 (Louisiana), a spur route in Baton Rouge, Louisiana
- Interstate 110 (Mississippi), a spur route in Biloxi, Mississippi
- Interstate 110 (Texas), a spur route in El Paso, Texas
- The stub of the San Bernardino Freeway west of I-5, formerly designated as Interstate 110 and now legislatively part of I-10
