= Lectionary 215 =

Lectionary ℓ 215
- New Testament manuscript
- Text: Evangelistarium
- Date: 13th or 14th century
- Script: Greek
- Now at: ?
- Size: 24 cm by 18 cm

Lectionary 215, designated by siglum ℓ 215 (in the Gregory-Aland numbering) is a Greek manuscript of the New Testament, on parchment. Palaeographically it has been assigned to the 13th or 14th century. Scrivener labelled it by 240^{evl}.

== Description ==
The codex contains lessons from the Gospels of John, Matthew, and Luke in a lectionary (Evangelistarium), on 137 parchment leaves (24 cm by 18 cm), with some lacunae. The text is written in Greek minuscule letters, in two columns per page, 25-29 lines per page.

In John 1:18 it has μονογενης without υιος.

Several different leaves at the end (3rd, 4th, 5th, and 7th leaves) are palimpsests, from the 10th century, are written in uncial letters, in two columns per page, 32 lines per page (almost illegible). According to Gregory they have text from Book of Job and 1 Peter.

There are daily lessons from Easter to Pentecost.

== History ==
Scrivener and Gregory dated the manuscript to the 13th century. It has been assigned by the Institute for New Testament Textual Research to the 13th or 14th century.

Of the history of the codex nothing is known until 1864, when it was in the possession of a dealer at Janina in Epeiros. It was then purchased from him by a representative of Baroness Burdett-Coutts (1814–1906), a philanthropist, along with other Greek manuscripts. They were transported to England in 1870-1871. The manuscript was presented by Burdett-Coutts to Sir Roger Cholmely's School, and was housed at the Highgate (Burdett-Coutts I. 8), in London.

The manuscript was added to the list of New Testament manuscripts by Scrivener (number 240) and Gregory (number 215). Gregory saw it in 1883.

The manuscript is not cited in the critical editions of the Greek New Testament (UBS3).

The owner of the codex is unknown. The last place of its housing was Sotheby's.

== See also ==
- List of New Testament lectionaries
- Biblical manuscript
- Textual criticism

== Bibliography ==
- Gregory, Caspar René (1900). Textkritik des Neuen Testaments. Vol. 1. Leipzig. p. 405.
