= Flight 205 =

Flight 205 may refer to:

- Austral Líneas Aéreas Flight 205, crashed on 16 January 1959
- RwandAir Flight 205, crashed on 12 November 2009
