= Minuscule 580 =

- New Testament manuscript
- Text: Gospels
- Date: 12th century
- Script: Greek
- Now at: National Library of France
- Size: 15.2 cm by 12.3 cm
- Type: Byzantine text-type
- Category: V

Minuscule 580 (in the Gregory-Aland numbering), ε 1291 (von Soden), is a Greek minuscule manuscript of the New Testament, on parchment. Palaeographically it has been assigned to the 12th century.

== Description ==
The codex contains a complete text of the four Gospels on 385 leaves (size 15.2 cm by 12.3 cm). It is written in one column per page, 16 lines per page. The words are written continuously without any separation.

It contains Epistula ad Carpianum, Eusebian tables, lists of the κεφαλαια are placed before every Gospel, numerals of the κεφαλαια are given at the margin, the τιτλοι, the Ammonian Sections (in Mark 233 Sections – the last in 16:5), (not the Eusebian Canons), lectionary markings, liturgical books with hagiographies (Synaxarion and Menologion).

According to Scrivener it is a beautiful manuscript.

== Text ==
The Greek text of the codex is a representative of the Byzantine text-type. Aland placed it in Category V. According to the Claremont Profile Method it represents the textual family K^{x} in Luke 1 and Luke 10, but in Luke 20 it belongs to the textual group Π473.

== History ==
The manuscript was examined and described by Paulin Martin, and by William Hatch.

Scrivener labelled it by 744.

The manuscript currently housed in at the National Library of France (Gr. 119), at Paris.

== See also ==
- List of New Testament minuscules
- Biblical manuscript
- Textual criticism
