= Interstate 595 =

Interstate 595 may refer to:

- Interstate 595 (Florida), a spur from I-75 across I-95 to Fort Lauderdale, Florida
- Interstate 595 (Maryland), an unsigned spur to Annapolis, Maryland
- Interstate 170 (Maryland), a partially built spur in Baltimore, Maryland that was renumbered Interstate 595 when I-70 was cancelled between I-695 and I-170
- Interstate 595 (Virginia), a never-built upgrade for US 1 in Arlington, Virginia
