= Interstate 305 =

Interstate 305 may refer to:

- Interstate 305 (California), an unsigned designation for U.S. Route 50 and Interstate 80 Business in West Sacramento and Sacramento, California
- Interstate 305 (Oregon), an unbuilt auxiliary designation for Oregon Route 99E Business in Salem, Oregon
