= Interstate 480 =

Interstate 480 may refer to:

- Interstate 480 (Nebraska–Iowa), a loop through Omaha, Nebraska into Council Bluffs, Iowa
- Interstate 480 (Ohio), a loop through Cleveland, Ohio
- Interstate 480 (California), the former Embarcadero Freeway in San Francisco, California
- Interstate 476, designated as Interstate 480 back when I-76 was I-80S
