= Interstate 205 =

Interstate 205 may refer to either of two unconnected Interstate Highways in the United States, both of which are related to Interstate 5

- Interstate 205 (California), a connector in the San Francisco Bay Area
- Interstate 205 (Oregon–Washington), a bypass of Portland, Oregon
