= Interstate 880 =

Interstate 880 may refer to:

- Interstate 880 (California), an auxiliary Interstate Highway that travels from San Jose to Oakland, California
  - Interstate 880 (California 1964–1981), a former auxiliary Interstate Highway in Sacramento, California
- Interstate 880 (Iowa), an auxiliary Interstate Highway in Pottawattamie County, Iowa
