= Interstate 215 =

Interstate 215 is the designation for several Interstate Highways in the United States, all of which are related to Interstate 15 (I-15):

- Interstate 215 (California), a regional Interstate bypass for I-15 and a connection to I-10 that serves the Riverside–San Bernardino–Ontario metropolitan area in southern California
- Interstate 215 (Nevada), a metropolitan Interstate bypass for I-15 and a connection to I-11 that serves the Las Vegas metropolitan area suburbs in southern Nevada and is part of the Las Vegas Beltway
- Interstate 215 (Utah), a metropolitan Interstate bypass for I-15 and I-80 that serves the Salt Lake City metropolitan area suburbs in northern Utah
