= Interstate 580 =

Interstate 580 is or was the designation for several Interstate Highways in the United States, all of which are related to Interstate 80:

- Interstate 580 (California), a spur connecting the San Francisco Bay Area to the San Joaquin Valley from U.S. Route 101 to Interstate 5
- Interstate 580 (Nevada), a spur connecting Carson City, Nevada to Reno, Nevada (co-signed along its entire length with U.S. Route 395)
- Interstate 580 (Nebraska), a former route and now part of U.S. Route 75 in Omaha, Nebraska
