= List of Kosmos satellites (501–750) =

The designation Kosmos (Russian: Космос meaning Cosmos) is a generic name given to a large number of Soviet, and subsequently Russian, satellites, the first of which was launched in 1962. Satellites given Kosmos designations include military spacecraft, failed probes to the Moon and the planets, prototypes for crewed spacecraft, and scientific spacecraft. This is a list of satellites with Kosmos designations between 501 and 750.

Designation	Type	Launch date (GMT)	Carrier rocket	Function	Decay/Destruction*	Remarks
Kosmos 501	DS-P1-Yu	12 July 1972; 05:59	Kosmos-2I 63SM	Radar target	9 May 1974	DS-P1-Yu #50, fifty-sixth of seventy nine DS-P1-Yu satellites
Kosmos 502	Zenit-4MT	13 July 1972; 14:30	Soyuz-M 11A511M	Reconnaissance	25 July 1972	
Kosmos 503	Zenit-4M	19 July 1972; 13:45	Voskhod 11A57	Reconnaissance	1 August 1972	
Kosmos 504	Strela-1M	20 July 1972; 18:10	Kosmos-3M 11K65M	Communication	in orbit	
Kosmos 505	Strela-1M	20 July 1972; 18:10	Kosmos-3M 11K65M	Communication	in orbit	
Kosmos 506	Strela-1M	20 July 1972; 18:10	Kosmos-3M 11K65M	Communication	in orbit	
Kosmos 507	Strela-1M	20 July 1972; 18:10	Kosmos-3M 11K65M	Communication	in orbit	
Kosmos 508	Strela-1M	20 July 1972; 18:10	Kosmos-3M 11K65M	Communication	in orbit	
Kosmos 509	Strela-1M	20 July 1972; 18:10	Kosmos-3M 11K65M	Communication	in orbit	
Kosmos 510	Strela-1M	20 July 1972; 18:10	Kosmos-3M 11K65M	Communication	in orbit	
Kosmos 511	Strela-1M	20 July 1972; 18:10	Kosmos-3M 11K65M	Communication	in orbit	
Kosmos 512	Zenit-2M	28 July 1972; 10:19	Voskhod 11A57	Reconnaissance	9 August 1972	
Kosmos 513	Zenit-4M	2 August 1972; 08:15	Voskhod 11A57	Reconnaissance	15 August 1972	
Kosmos 514	Tsiklon	16 August 1972; 13:40	Kosmos-3M 11K65M	Navigation	in orbit	Orbit - a nearly circular 1000 km. Inclination 83 degrees. All previous Navsat Kosmos satellites were placed in an orbital inclination of 74 degrees.
Kosmos 515	Zenit-4MK	18 August 1972; 10:00	Voskhod 11A57	Reconnaissance	31 August 1972	
Kosmos 516	US-A	21 August 1972; 10:36	Tsyklon-2 11K69	Reconnaissance	20 October 1972	
Kosmos 517	Zenit-2M	30 August 1972; 08:19	Voskhod 11A57	Reconnaissance	11 September 1972	
Kosmos 518	Zenit-2M	15 September 1972; 09:40	Voskhod 11A57	Reconnaissance	24 September 1972	
Kosmos 519	Zenit-4M	16 September 1972; 08:20	Voskhod 11A57	Reconnaissance	26 September 1972	
Kosmos 520	Oko	19 September 1972; 19:19	Molniya-M 8K78M	Missile defence	in orbit	Plesetsk launch. Orbit 650 x 39,300 km. Inclination 63 degrees. Weight-possibly 2 tonnes. First operational missile early warning satellite.
Kosmos 521	DS-P1-M	29 September 1972; 20:18	Kosmos-3M 11K65M	ASAT target	in orbit	DS-P1-M #4, last of five DS-P1-M satellites. Telemetry system malfunctioned, interceptor not launched
Kosmos 522	Zenit-4M	4 October 1972; 12:00	Voskhod 11A57	Reconnaissance	17 October 1972	
Kosmos 523	DS-P1-Yu	5 October 1972; 11:30	Kosmos-2I 63SM	Radar target	7 March 1973	DS-P1-Yu #63, fifty-seventh of seventy nine DS-P1-Yu satellites
Kosmos 524	DS-P1-Yu	11 October 1972; 13:19	Kosmos-2I 63SM	Radar target	25 March 1973	DS-P1-Yu #49, fifty-eighth of seventy nine DS-P1-Yu satellites
Kosmos 525	Zenit-2M	18 October 1972; 11:59	Voskhod 11A57	Reconnaissance	29 October 1972	
Kosmos 526	DS-P1-Yu	25 October 1972; 10:39	Kosmos-2I 63SM	Radar target	8 April 1973	DS-P1-Yu #61, fifty-ninth of seventy nine DS-P1-Yu satellites
Kosmos 527	Zenit-4MK	31 October 1972; 13:29	Voskhod 11A57	Reconnaissance	13 November 1972	
Kosmos 528	Strela-1M	1 November 1972; 02:08	Kosmos-3M 11K65M	Communication	in orbit	
Kosmos 529	Strela-1M	1 November 1972; 02:08	Kosmos-3M 11K65M	Communication	in orbit	
Kosmos 530	Strela-1M	1 November 1972; 02:08	Kosmos-3M 11K65M	Communication	in orbit	
Kosmos 531	Strela-1M	1 November 1972; 02:08	Kosmos-3M 11K65M	Communication	in orbit	
Kosmos 532	Strela-1M	1 November 1972; 02:08	Kosmos-3M 11K65M	Communication	in orbit	
Kosmos 533	Strela-1M	1 November 1972; 02:08	Kosmos-3M 11K65M	Communication	in orbit	
Kosmos 534	Strela-1M	1 November 1972; 02:08	Kosmos-3M 11K65M	Communication	in orbit	
Kosmos 535	Strela-1M	1 November 1972; 02:08	Kosmos-3M 11K65M	Communication	in orbit	
Kosmos 536	Tselina-O	3 November 1972; 01:34	Kosmos-3M 11K65M	ELINT	20 July 1980	
Kosmos 537	Zenit-2M	25 November 1972; 09:10	Voskhod 11A57	Reconnaissance	7 December 1972	
Kosmos 538	Zenit-4M	14 December 1972; 13:40	Voskhod 11A57	Reconnaissance	27 December 1972	
Kosmos 539	Sfera	21 December 1972; 02:05	Kosmos-3M 11K65M	Geodesy	in orbit	
Kosmos 540	Strela-2	25 December 1972; 23:05	Kosmos-3M 11K65M	Communication	in orbit	
Kosmos 541	Zenit-4MT	27 December 1972; 10:30	Soyuz-M 11A511M	Reconnaissance	8 January 1973	
Kosmos 542	Tselina-D	28 December 1972; 11:00	Vostok-2M 8A92M	ELINT	9 October 1983	
Kosmos 543	Zenit-4M	11 January 1973; 10:00	Voskhod 11A57	Reconnaissance	24 January 1973	
Kosmos 544	Tselina-O	20 January 1973; 03:36	Kosmos-3M 11K65M	ELINT	15 June 1980	
Kosmos 545	DS-P1-Yu	24 January 1973; 11:44	Kosmos-2I 63SM	Radar target	31 July 1973	DS-P1-Yu #62, sixtieth of seventy nine DS-P1-Yu satellites
Kosmos 546	Tsiklon	26 January 1973; 11:44	Kosmos-3M 11K65M	Navigation	in orbit	
Kosmos 547	Zenit-2M	1 February 1973; 08:30	Voskhod 11A57	Reconnaissance	13 February 1973	
Kosmos 548	Zenit-4M	8 February 1973; 13:15	Voskhod 11A57	Reconnaissance	21 February 1973	
Kosmos 549	Tselina-O	28 February 1973; 04:37	Kosmos-3M 11K65M	ELINT	29 June 1980	
Kosmos 550	Zenit-4MK	1 March 1973; 12:40	Voskhod 11A57	Reconnaissance	11 March 1973	
Kosmos 551	Zenit-4M	6 March 1973; 09:20	Voskhod 11A57	Reconnaissance	20 March 1973	
Kosmos 552	Zenit-2M	22 March 1973; 10:00	Voskhod 11A57	Reconnaissance	3 April 1973	
Kosmos 553	DS-P1-Yu	12 April 1973; 11:49	Kosmos-2I 63SM	Radar target	11 November 1973	DS-P1-Yu #55, sixty-first of seventy nine DS-P1-Yu satellites
Kosmos 554	Zenit-4MK	19 April 1973; 08:59	Voskhod 11A57	Reconnaissance	7 May 1973	
Kosmos 555	Zenit-2M	25 April 1973; 10:45	Voskhod 11A57	Reconnaissance	7 May 1973	
Kosmos 556	Zenit-4MK	5 May 1973; 07:00	Voskhod 11A57	Reconnaissance	14 May 1973	
Kosmos 557	DOS	11 May 1973; 00:20	Proton-K 8K72K	Space station	22 May 1973	
Kosmos 558	DS-P1-Yu	17 May 1973; 13:19	Kosmos-2I 63SM	Radar target	22 December 1973	DS-P1-Yu #65, sixty-second of seventy nine DS-P1-Yu satellites
Kosmos 559	Zenit-4MK	18 May 1973; 11:00	Soyuz-U 11A511U	Reconnaissance	23 May 1973	
Kosmos 560	Zenit-4M	23 May 1973; 10:30	Voskhod 11A57	Reconnaissance	5 June 1973	
Kosmos 561	Zenit-2M	25 May 1973; 13:30	Voskhod 11A57	Reconnaissance	6 June 1973	
Kosmos 562	DS-P1-Yu	5 June 1973; 11:29	Kosmos-2I 63SM	Radar target	7 January 1974	DS-P1-Yu #66, sixty-third of seventy nine DS-P1-Yu satellites
Kosmos 563	Zenit-4M	6 June 1973; 11:30	Voskhod 11A57	Reconnaissance	18 June 1973	
Kosmos 564	Strela-1M	8 June 1973; 15:50	Kosmos-3M 11K65M	Communication	in orbit	
Kosmos 565	Strela-1M	8 June 1973; 15:50	Kosmos-3M 11K65M	Communication	in orbit	
Kosmos 566	Strela-1M	8 June 1973; 15:50	Kosmos-3M 11K65M	Communication	in orbit	
Kosmos 567	Strela-1M	8 June 1973; 15:50	Kosmos-3M 11K65M	Communication	in orbit	
Kosmos 568	Strela-1M	8 June 1973; 15:50	Kosmos-3M 11K65M	Communication	in orbit	
Kosmos 569	Strela-1M	8 June 1973; 15:50	Kosmos-3M 11K65M	Communication	in orbit	
Kosmos 570	Strela-1M	8 June 1973; 15:50	Kosmos-3M 11K65M	Communication	in orbit	
Kosmos 571	Strela-1M	8 June 1973; 15:50	Kosmos-3M 11K65M	Communication	in orbit	
Kosmos 572	Zenit-4M	10 June 1973; 10:10	Voskhod 11A57	Reconnaissance	23 June 1973	
Kosmos 573	Soyuz 7K-T	15 June 1973; 06:00	Soyuz 11A511	Test	17 June 1973	
Kosmos 574	Tsiklon	20 June 1973; 06:16	Kosmos-3M 11K65M	Navigation	in orbit	
Kosmos 575	Zenit-2M	21 June 1973; 13:29	Voskhod 11A57	Reconnaissance	3 July 1973	
Kosmos 576	Zenit-4MT	27 June 1973; 11:50	Soyuz-M 11A511M	Reconnaissance	9 July 1973	
Kosmos 577	Zenit-4M	25 July 1973; 11:30	Voskhod 11A57	Reconnaissance	7 August 1973	
Kosmos 578	Zenit-2M	1 August 1973; 14:00	Voskhod 11A57	Reconnaissance	13 August 1973	
Kosmos 579	Zenit-4M	21 August 1973; 12:30	Voskhod 11A57	Reconnaissance	3 September 1973	
Kosmos 580	DS-P1-Yu	22 August 1973; 11:24	Kosmos-2I 63SM	Radar target	1 April 1974	DS-P1-Yu #59, sixty-fourth of seventy nine DS-P1-Yu satellites
Kosmos 581	Zenit-4M	24 August 1973; 10:59	Voskhod 11A57	Reconnaissance	6 September 1973	
Kosmos 582	Tselina-O	28 August 1973; 10:08	Kosmos-3M 11K65M	ELINT	5 September 1980	
Kosmos 583	Zenit-2M	30 August 1973; 10:30	Voskhod 11A57	Reconnaissance	12 September 1973	
Kosmos 584	Zenit-4M	6 September 1973; 10:40	Voskhod 11A57	Reconnaissance	20 September 1973	
Kosmos 585	Sfera	8 September 1973; 01:50	Kosmos-3M 11K65M	Geodesy	in orbit	
Kosmos 586	Tsiklon	14 September 1973; 00:31	Kosmos-3M 11K65M	Navigation	in orbit	
Kosmos 587	Zenit-4MK	21 September 1973; 13:05	Soyuz-U 11A511U	Reconnaissance	4 October 1973	
Kosmos 588	Strela-1M	2 October 1973; 21:46	Kosmos-3M 11K65M	Communication	in orbit	
Kosmos 589	Strela-1M	2 October 1973; 21:46	Kosmos-3M 11K65M	Communication	in orbit	
Kosmos 590	Strela-1M	2 October 1973; 21:46	Kosmos-3M 11K65M	Communication	in orbit	
Kosmos 591	Strela-1M	2 October 1973; 21:46	Kosmos-3M 11K65M	Communication	in orbit	
Kosmos 592	Strela-1M	2 October 1973; 21:46	Kosmos-3M 11K65M	Communication	in orbit	
Kosmos 593	Strela-1M	2 October 1973; 21:46	Kosmos-3M 11K65M	Communication	in orbit	
Kosmos 594	Strela-1M	2 October 1973; 21:46	Kosmos-3M 11K65M	Communication	in orbit	
Kosmos 595	Strela-1M	2 October 1973; 21:46	Kosmos-3M 11K65M	Communication	in orbit	
Kosmos 596	Zenit-2M	3 October 1973; 13:00	Voskhod 11A57	Reconnaissance	9 October 1973	
Kosmos 597	Zenit-4MK	6 October 1973; 12:30	Voskhod 11A57	Reconnaissance	12 October 1973	
Kosmos 598	Zenit-4M	10 October 1973; 10:45	Voskhod 11A57	Reconnaissance	16 October 1973	
Kosmos 599	Zenit-2M	15 October 1973; 08:45	Voskhod 11A57	Reconnaissance	28 October 1973	
Kosmos 600	Zenit-4M	16 October 1973; 12:00	Voskhod 11A57	Reconnaissance	23 October 1973	
Kosmos 601	DS-P1-Yu	16 October 1973; 14:00	Kosmos-2I 63SM	Radar target	15 August 1974	DS-P1-Yu #60, sixty-fifth of seventy nine DS-P1-Yu satellites
Kosmos 602	Zenit-4MK	20 October 1973; 10:14	Voskhod 11A57	Reconnaissance	29 October 1973	
Kosmos 603	Zenit-4M	27 October 1973; 11:09	Voskhod 11A57	Reconnaissance	9 November 1973	
Kosmos 604	Tselina-D	29 October 1973; 14:00	Vostok-2M 8A92M	ELINT	19 January 1992	
Kosmos 605	Bion	31 October 1973; 18:24	Soyuz-U 11A511U	Biological	22 November 1973	
Kosmos 606	Oko	2 November 1973; 13:01	Molniya-M 8K78M	Missile defence	in orbit	
Kosmos 607	Zenit-4MK	10 November 1973; 12:38	Voskhod 11A57	Reconnaissance	22 November 1973	
Kosmos 608	DS-P1-Yu	20 November 1973; 12:29	Kosmos-2I 63SM	Radar target	10 July 1974	DS-P1-Yu #69, sixty-sixth of seventy nine DS-P1-Yu satellites
Kosmos 609	Zenit-4M	21 November 1973; 10:00	Voskhod 11A57	Reconnaissance	4 December 1973	
Kosmos 610	Tselina-O	27 November 1973; 00:08	Kosmos-3M 11K65M	ELINT	15 September 1980	
Kosmos 611	DS-P1-Yu	28 November 1973; 09:29	Kosmos-2I 63SM	Radar target	19 June 1974	DS-P1-Yu #64, sixty-seventh of seventy nine DS-P1-Yu satellites
Kosmos 612	Zenit-4MK	28 November 1973; 11:43	Voskhod 11A57	Reconnaissance	11 December 1973	
Kosmos 613	Soyuz 7K-T	30 November 1973; 05:20	Soyuz 11A511	Test	29 January 1974	
Kosmos 614	Strela-2	4 December 1973; 15:00	Kosmos-3M 11K65M	Communication	in orbit	
Kosmos 615	DS-P1-I	13 December 1973; 11:10	Kosmos-2I 63SM	Radar target	17 December 1975	DS-P1-I #13, thirteenth of nineteen DS-P1-I satellites
Kosmos 616	Zenit-4MT	17 December 1973; 12:00	Soyuz-M 11A511M	Reconnaissance	28 December 1973	
Kosmos 617	Strela-1M	19 December 1973; 09:43	Kosmos-3M 11K65M	Communication	in orbit	
Kosmos 618	Strela-1M	19 December 1973; 09:43	Kosmos-3M 11K65M	Communication	in orbit	
Kosmos 619	Strela-1M	19 December 1973; 09:43	Kosmos-3M 11K65M	Communication	in orbit	
Kosmos 620	Strela-1M	19 December 1973; 09:43	Kosmos-3M 11K65M	Communication	in orbit	
Kosmos 621	Strela-1M	19 December 1973; 09:43	Kosmos-3M 11K65M	Communication	in orbit	
Kosmos 622	Strela-1M	19 December 1973; 09:43	Kosmos-3M 11K65M	Communication	in orbit	
Kosmos 623	Strela-1M	19 December 1973; 09:43	Kosmos-3M 11K65M	Communication	in orbit	
Kosmos 624	Strela-1M	19 December 1973; 09:43	Kosmos-3M 11K65M	Communication	in orbit	
Kosmos 625	Zenit-4MK	21 December 1973; 12:30	Voskhod 11A57	Reconnaissance	3 January 1974	
Kosmos 626	US-A	27 December 1973; 20:19	Tsyklon-2 11K69	Reconnaissance	22 March 1974	
Kosmos 627	Tsiklon	29 December 1973; 04:12	Kosmos-3M 11K65M	Navigation	in orbit	
Kosmos 628	Tsiklon	17 January 1974; 10:07	Kosmos-3M 11K65M	Navigation	in orbit	
Kosmos 629	Zenit-2M	24 January 1974; 15:00	Voskhod 11A57	Reconnaissance	5 February 1974	
Kosmos 630	Zenit-4MK	30 January 1974; 11:00	Voskhod 11A57	Reconnaissance	13 February 1974	
Kosmos 631	Tselina-O	6 February 1974; 00:34	Kosmos-3M 11K65M	ELINT	3 October 1980	
Kosmos 632	Zenit-4M	12 February 1974; 08:56	Voskhod 11A57	Reconnaissance	26 February 1974	
Kosmos 633	DS-P1-Yu	27 February 1974; 11:05	Kosmos-2I 63SM	Radar target	4 October 1974	DS-P1-Yu #71, sixty-eighth of seventy nine DS-P1-Yu satellites
Kosmos 634	DS-P1-Yu	5 March 1974; 16:05	Kosmos-2I 63SM	Radar target	9 October 1974	DS-P1-Yu #67, sixty-ninth of seventy nine DS-P1-Yu satellites
Kosmos 635	Zenit-2M	14 March 1974; 10:30	Voskhod 11A57	Reconnaissance	26 March 1974	
Kosmos 636	Zenit-4MK	20 March 1974; 08:30	Soyuz-U 11A511U	Reconnaissance	3 April 1974	
Kosmos 637	Raduga	26 March 1974; 13:35	Proton-K/DM 8K72K	Rehearsal for the new Statsionar series. Boilerplate test.	in orbit	Baikonur launch. Orbit 35,407 x 35,760 km. Inclination 25 degrees. First USSR geosynchronous satellite.
Kosmos 638	Soyuz 7K-TM	3 April 1974; 07:30	Soyuz-U 11A511U	Test	13 April 1974	
Kosmos 639	Zenit-4MK	4 April 1974; 08:30	Voskhod 11A57	Reconnaissance	15 April 1974	
Kosmos 640	Zenit-2M	11 April 1974; 12:23	Voskhod 11A57	Reconnaissance	23 April 1974	
Kosmos 641	Strela-1M	23 April 1974; 14:15	Kosmos-3M 11K65M	Communication	in orbit	
Kosmos 642	Strela-1M	23 April 1974; 14:15	Kosmos-3M 11K65M	Communication	in orbit	
Kosmos 643	Strela-1M	23 April 1974; 14:15	Kosmos-3M 11K65M	Communication	in orbit	
Kosmos 644	Strela-1M	23 April 1974; 14:15	Kosmos-3M 11K65M	Communication	in orbit	
Kosmos 645	Strela-1M	23 April 1974; 14:15	Kosmos-3M 11K65M	Communication	in orbit	
Kosmos 646	Strela-1M	23 April 1974; 14:15	Kosmos-3M 11K65M	Communication	in orbit	
Kosmos 647	Strela-1M	23 April 1974; 14:15	Kosmos-3M 11K65M	Communication	in orbit	
Kosmos 648	Strela-1M	23 April 1974; 14:15	Kosmos-3M 11K65M	Communication	in orbit	
Kosmos 649	Zenit-4MK	29 April 1974; 13:30	Voskhod 11A57	Reconnaissance	11 May 1974	
Kosmos 650	Sfera	29 April 1974; 17:10	Kosmos-3M 11K65M	Geodesy	in orbit	
Kosmos 651	US-A	15 May 1974; 07:30	Tsyklon-2 11K69	Reconnaissance	5 September 1974	
Kosmos 652	Zenit-4MK	15 May 1974; 08:30	Soyuz-U 11A511U	Reconnaissance	23 May 1974	
Kosmos 653	Zenit-2M	15 May 1974; 12:30	Voskhod 11A57	Reconnaissance	27 May 1974	
Kosmos 654	US-A	17 May 1974; 06:53	Tsyklon-2 11K69	Reconnaissance	7 September 1974	
Kosmos 655	Tselina-O	21 May 1974; 06:16	Kosmos-3M 11K65M	ELINT	19 November 1980	
Kosmos 656	Soyuz 7K-T	27 May 1974; 07:20	Soyuz 11A511	Test	29 May 1974	
Kosmos 657	Zenit-4MK	30 May 1974; 12:45	Voskhod 11A57	Reconnaissance	13 June 1974	
Kosmos 658	Zenit-2M	6 June 1974; 06:20	Voskhod 11A57	Reconnaissance	18 June 1974	
Kosmos 659	Zenit-4MK	13 June 1974; 12:30	Voskhod 11A57	Reconnaissance	26 June 1974	
Kosmos 660	Taifun-1	18 June 1974; 13:00	Kosmos-3M 11K65M	Radar target	in orbit	
Kosmos 661	Tselina-O	21 June 1974; 09:03	Kosmos-3M 11K65M	ELINT	27 August 1980	
Kosmos 662	DS-P1-I	26 June 1974; 12:30	Kosmos-2I 63SM	Radar target	28 August 1976	DS-P1-I #14, fourteenth of nineteen DS-P1-I satellites
Kosmos 663	Tsiklon	27 June 1974; 15:40	Kosmos-3M 11K65M	Navigation	in orbit	
Kosmos 664	Zenit-4MT	29 June 1974; 12:50	Soyuz-M 11A511M	Reconnaissance	11 July 1974	
Kosmos 665	Oko	29 June 1974; 15:59	Molniya-M 8K78M	Missile defence	6 July 1990	
Kosmos 666	Zenit-4MK	12 July 1974; 12:50	Voskhod 11A57	Reconnaissance	25 July 1974	
Kosmos 667	Zenit-4M	25 July 1974; 07:00	Voskhod 11A57	Reconnaissance	7 August 1974	
Kosmos 668	DS-P1-Yu	25 July 1974; 12:00	Kosmos-2I 63SM	Radar target	21 February 1975	DS-P1-Yu #74, seventy-first of seventy nine DS-P1-Yu satellites
Kosmos 669	Zenit-2M	26 July 1974; 07:00	Voskhod 11A57	Reconnaissance	8 August 1974	
Kosmos 670	Soyuz 7K-S	6 August 1974; 00:02	Soyuz-U 11A511U	Test	9 August 1974	
Kosmos 671	Zenit-4MK	7 August 1974; 12:50	Voskhod 11A57	Reconnaissance	20 August 1974	
Kosmos 672	Soyuz 7K-TM	12 August 1974; 06:25	Soyuz-U 11A511U	Test	18 August 1974	
Kosmos 673	Tselina-D	16 August 1974; 03:41	Vostok-2M 8A92M	ELINT	1 June 1991	
Kosmos 674	Zenit-4MK	29 August 1974; 07:39	Voskhod 11A57	Reconnaissance	7 September 1974	
Kosmos 675	Sfera	29 August 1974; 14:55	Kosmos-3M 11K65M	Geodesy	in orbit	
Kosmos 676	Strela-2	11 September 1974; 17:40	Kosmos-3M 11K65M	Communication	in orbit	
Kosmos 677	Strela-1M	19 September 1974; 14:57	Kosmos-3M 11K65M	Communication	in orbit	
Kosmos 678	Strela-1M	19 September 1974; 14:57	Kosmos-3M 11K65M	Communication	in orbit	
Kosmos 679	Strela-1M	19 September 1974; 14:57	Kosmos-3M 11K65M	Communication	in orbit	
Kosmos 680	Strela-1M	19 September 1974; 14:57	Kosmos-3M 11K65M	Communication	in orbit	
Kosmos 681	Strela-1M	19 September 1974; 14:57	Kosmos-3M 11K65M	Communication	in orbit	
Kosmos 682	Strela-1M	19 September 1974; 14:57	Kosmos-3M 11K65M	Communication	in orbit	
Kosmos 683	Strela-1M	19 September 1974; 14:57	Kosmos-3M 11K65M	Communication	in orbit	
Kosmos 684	Strela-1M	19 September 1974; 14:57	Kosmos-3M 11K65M	Communication	in orbit	
Kosmos 685	Zenit-2M	20 September 1974; 09:30	Voskhod 11A57	Reconnaissance	2 October 1974	
Kosmos 686	DS-P1-Yu	26 September 1974; 16:34	Kosmos-2I 63SM	Radar target	1 May 1975	DS-P1-Yu #72, seventy-second of seventy nine DS-P1-Yu satellites
Kosmos 687	Taifun-1	11 October 1974; 11:30	Kosmos-3M 11K65M	Radar target	5 February 1978	
Kosmos 688	Zenit-4MK	18 October 1974; 15:00	Voskhod 11A57	Reconnaissance	30 October 1974	
Kosmos 689	Tsiklon	18 October 1974; 22:36	Kosmos-3M 11K65M	Navigation	in orbit	
Kosmos 690	Bion	22 October 1974; 18:00	Soyuz-U 11A511U	Biological	12 November 1974	
Kosmos 691	Zenit-4MK	25 October 1974; 09:30	Soyuz-U 11A511U	Reconnaissance	6 November 1974	
Kosmos 692	Zenit-2M	1 November 1974; 14:20	Voskhod 11A57	Reconnaissance	13 November 1974	
Kosmos 693	Zenit-4MT	4 November 1974; 10:40	Soyuz-M 11A511M	Reconnaissance	16 November 1974	
Kosmos 694	Zenit-4MK	16 November 1974; 11:45	Voskhod 11A57	Reconnaissance	29 November 1974	
Kosmos 695	DS-P1-Yu	20 November 1974; 11:59	Kosmos-2I 63SM	Radar target	15 July 1975	DS-P1-Yu #73, seventy-third of seventy nine DS-P1-Yu satellites
Kosmos 696	Zenit-2M	27 November 1974; 11:45	Voskhod 11A57	Reconnaissance	9 December 1974	
Kosmos 697	Yantar-2K	13 December 1974; 13:30	Soyuz-U 11A511U	Reconnaissance	25 December 1974	
Kosmos 698	Tselina-O	18 December 1974; 14:12	Kosmos-3M 11K65M	ELINT	9 December 1980	
Kosmos 699	US-P	24 December 1974; 11:00	Tsyklon-2 11K69	ELINT	17 April 1975	699 Experienced two break-ups in 1975, on April 17 and on August 2. At the time it had been in a state of natural decay for about a month. The numerous pieces of debris are untrackable.
Kosmos 700	Parus	26 December 1974; 12:00	Kosmos-3M 11K65M	Navigation, Communication	in orbit	First satellite of the Parus-series military communication satellites
Kosmos 701	Zenit-4MK	27 December 1974; 09:10	Voskhod 11A57	Reconnaissance	9 January 1975	
Kosmos 702	Zenit-2M	17 January 1975; 09:07	Voskhod 11A57	Reconnaissance	29 January 1975	
Kosmos 703	DS-P1-Yu	21 January 1975; 11:04	Kosmos-2I 63SM	Radar target	20 November 1975	DS-P1-Yu #70, seventy-fourth of seventy nine DS-P1-Yu satellites
Kosmos 704	Zenit-4MK	23 January 1975; 11:00	Voskhod 11A57	Reconnaissance	6 February 1975	
Kosmos 705	DS-P1-Yu	28 January 1975; 12:05	Kosmos-2I 63SM	Radar target	18 November 1975	DS-P1-Yu #75, seventy-fifth of seventy nine DS-P1-Yu satellites
Kosmos 706	Oko	30 January 1975; 15:02	Molniya-M 8K78M	Missile defence	in orbit	
Kosmos 707	Tselina-O	5 February 1975; 13:15	Kosmos-3M 11K65M	ELINT	7 September 1980	
Kosmos 708	Sfera	12 February 1975; 03:30	Kosmos-3M 11K65M	Geodesy	in orbit	
Kosmos 709	Zenit-4MK	12 February 1975; 14:30	Voskhod 11A57	Reconnaissance	25 February 1975	
Kosmos 710	Zenit-4MK	26 February 1975; 09:00	Voskhod 11A57	Reconnaissance	12 March 1975	
Kosmos 711	Strela-1M	28 February 1975; 14:02	Kosmos-3M 11K65M	Communication	in orbit	
Kosmos 712	Strela-1M	28 February 1975; 14:02	Kosmos-3M 11K65M	Communication	in orbit	
Kosmos 713	Strela-1M	28 February 1975; 14:02	Kosmos-3M 11K65M	Communication	in orbit	
Kosmos 714	Strela-1M	28 February 1975; 14:02	Kosmos-3M 11K65M	Communication	in orbit	
Kosmos 715	Strela-1M	28 February 1975; 14:02	Kosmos-3M 11K65M	Communication	in orbit	
Kosmos 716	Strela-1M	28 February 1975; 14:02	Kosmos-3M 11K65M	Communication	in orbit	
Kosmos 717	Strela-1M	28 February 1975; 14:02	Kosmos-3M 11K65M	Communication	in orbit	
Kosmos 718	Strela-1M	28 February 1975; 14:02	Kosmos-3M 11K65M	Communication	in orbit	
Kosmos 719	Zenit-4MK	12 March 1975; 08:55	Voskhod 11A57	Reconnaissance	25 March 1975	
Kosmos 720	Zenit-4MT	21 March 1975; 06:50	Soyuz-U 11A511U	Reconnaissance	1 April 1975	
Kosmos 721	Zenit-2M	26 March 1975; 08:50	Voskhod 11A57	Reconnaissance	7 April 1975	
Kosmos 722	Zenit-4MK	27 March 1975; 08:00	Voskhod 11A57	Reconnaissance	9 April 1975	
Kosmos 723	US-A	2 April 1975; 11:00	Tsyklon-2 11K69	Reconnaissance	15 July 1975	
Kosmos 724	US-A	7 April 1975; 11:00	Tsyklon-2 11K69	Reconnaissance	7 August 1975	
Kosmos 725	DS-P1-Yu	8 April 1975; 18:29	Kosmos-2I 63SM	Radar target	6 January 1976	DS-P1-Yu #77, seventy-sixth of seventy nine DS-P1-Yu satellites
Kosmos 726	Parus	11 April 1975; 07:57	Kosmos-3M 11K65M	Navigation, Communication	in orbit	
Kosmos 727	Zenit-4MK	16 April 1975; 08:00	Soyuz-U 11A511U	Reconnaissance	28 April 1975	
Kosmos 728	Zenit-2M	18 April 1975; 10:00	Voskhod 11A57	Reconnaissance	29 April 1975	
Kosmos 729	Tsiklon	22 April 1975; 21:10	Kosmos-3M 11K65M	Navigation	in orbit	
Kosmos 730	Zenit-4MK	24 April 1975; 08:05	Voskhod 11A57	Reconnaissance	6 May 1975	
Kosmos 731	Zenit-2M	21 May 1975; 06:59	Voskhod 11A57	Reconnaissance	2 June 1975	
Kosmos 732	Strela-1M	28 May 1975; 00:25	Kosmos-3M 11K65M	Communication	in orbit	
Kosmos 733	Strela-1M	28 May 1975; 00:25	Kosmos-3M 11K65M	Communication	in orbit	
Kosmos 734	Strela-1M	28 May 1975; 00:25	Kosmos-3M 11K65M	Communication	in orbit	
Kosmos 735	Strela-1M	28 May 1975; 00:25	Kosmos-3M 11K65M	Communication	in orbit	
Kosmos 736	Strela-1M	28 May 1975; 00:25	Kosmos-3M 11K65M	Communication	in orbit	
Kosmos 737	Strela-1M	28 May 1975; 00:25	Kosmos-3M 11K65M	Communication	in orbit	
Kosmos 738	Strela-1M	28 May 1975; 00:25	Kosmos-3M 11K65M	Communication	in orbit	
Kosmos 739	Strela-1M	28 May 1975; 00:25	Kosmos-3M 11K65M	Communication	in orbit	
Kosmos 740	Zenit-4MK	28 May 1975; 07:29	Voskhod 11A57	Reconnaissance	10 June 1975	
Kosmos 741	Zenit-2M	30 May 1975; 06:45	Voskhod 11A57	Resource detection	11 June 1975	
Kosmos 742	Zenit-4MK	3 June 1975; 13:21	Voskhod 11A57	Reconnaissance	15 June 1975	
Kosmos 743	Zenit-4MK	12 June 1975; 12:30	Voskhod 11A57	Reconnaissance	25 June 1975	
Kosmos 744	Tselina-D	20 June 1975; 06:54	Vostok-2M 8A92M	ELINT	12 October 1991	
Kosmos 745	DS-P1-Yu	24 June 1975; 12:05	Kosmos-2I 63SM	Radar target	12 March 1976	DS-P1-Yu #76, seventy-seventh of seventy nine DS-P1-Yu satellites
Kosmos 746	Zenit-4MK	25 June 1975; 13:00	Voskhod 11A57	Reconnaissance	8 July 1975	
Kosmos 747	Zenit-2M	27 June 1975; 13:00	Voskhod 11A57	Reconnaissance	9 July 1975	
Kosmos 748	Zenit-4MK	3 July 1975; 13:40	Voskhod 11A57	Reconnaissance	16 July 1975	
Kosmos 749	Tselina-O	4 July 1975; 00:56	Kosmos-3M 11K65M	ELINT	26 September 1980	
Kosmos 750	DS-P1-I	17 July 1975; 09:10	Kosmos-2I 63SM	Radar target	29 September 1977	DS-P1-I #15, fifteenth of nineteen DS-P1-I satellites

* — satellite was destroyed in orbit rather than decaying and burning up in the Earth's atmosphere

== See also ==
- List of USA satellites
