= Kosmos 668 =

Soviet artificial satellite

- Mission type: ABM radar target
- COSPAR ID: 1974-058A
- SATCAT no.: 07385

Spacecraft properties
- Spacecraft type: DS-P1-Yu
- Manufacturer: Yuzhnoye
- Launch mass: 400 kilograms (880 lb)

Start of mission
- Launch date: 25 July 1974, 12:00 UTC
- Rocket: Kosmos-2I 63SM
- Launch site: Plesetsk 133/1

End of mission
- Decay date: 21 February 1975

Orbital parameters
- Reference system: Geocentric
- Regime: Low Earth
- Perigee altitude: 266 kilometres (165 mi)
- Apogee altitude: 475 kilometres (295 mi)
- Inclination: 70.9 degrees
- Period: 92 minutes

Kosmos 668 (Russian: Космос 668 meaning Cosmos 668), also known as DS-P1-Yu No.74, was a Soviet satellite which was launched in 1974 as part of the Dnepropetrovsk Sputnik programme. It was a 400-kilogram (880 lb) spacecraft, which was built by the Yuzhnoye Design Bureau, and was used as a radar calibration target for anti-ballistic missile tests.

The launch of Kosmos 668 took place from Site 133/1 at the Plesetsk Cosmodrome, and used a Kosmos-2I 63SM carrier rocket. It occurred at 12:00 UTC on 25 July 1974, and resulted in the satellite successfully reaching low Earth orbit. Upon reaching orbit, the satellite was assigned its Kosmos designation, and received the International Designator 1974-058A. The North American Aerospace Defense Command assigned it the catalogue number 07385.

Kosmos 668 was the seventy-first of seventy nine DS-P1-Yu satellites to be launched, and the sixty-fourth of seventy two to successfully reach orbit. It was operated in an orbit with a perigee of 266 kilometres (165 mi), an apogee of 475 kilometres (295 mi), 70.9 degrees of inclination, and an orbital period of 92 minutes. It remained in orbit until it decayed and reentered the atmosphere on 21 February 1975.

== See also ==
- 1974 in spaceflight
