= Kosmos 634 =

Soviet radar calibration satellite

- Mission type: ABM radar target
- COSPAR ID: 1974-012A
- SATCAT no.: 07211

Spacecraft properties
- Spacecraft type: DS-P1-Yu
- Manufacturer: Yuzhnoye
- Launch mass: 400 kilograms (880 lb)

Start of mission
- Launch date: 5 March 1974, 16:05 UTC
- Rocket: Kosmos-2I 63SM
- Launch site: Plesetsk 133/1

End of mission
- Decay date: 9 October 1974

Orbital parameters
- Reference system: Geocentric
- Regime: Low Earth
- Perigee altitude: 266 kilometres (165 mi)
- Apogee altitude: 464 kilometres (288 mi)
- Inclination: 70.9 degrees
- Period: 91.9 minutes

Kosmos 634 (Russian: Космос 634 meaning Cosmos 634), also known as DS-P1-Yu No.67, was a Soviet satellite which was launched in 1974 as part of the Dnepropetrovsk Sputnik programme. It was a 400-kilogram (880 lb) spacecraft, which was built by the Yuzhnoye Design Bureau, and was used as a radar calibration target for anti-ballistic missile tests.

The launch of Kosmos 634 took place from Site 133/1 at the Plesetsk Cosmodrome, and used a Kosmos-2I 63SM carrier rocket. It occurred at 16:05 UTC on 5 March 1974, and resulted in the satellite successfully reaching low Earth orbit. Upon reaching orbit, the satellite was assigned its Kosmos designation, and received the International Designator 1974-012A. The North American Aerospace Defense Command assigned it the catalogue number 07211.

Kosmos 634 was the sixty-ninth of seventy nine DS-P1-Yu satellites to be launched, and the sixty-third of seventy two to successfully reach orbit. It was operated in an orbit with a perigee of 266 kilometres (165 mi), an apogee of 464 kilometres (288 mi), 70.9 degrees of inclination, and an orbital period of 91.9 minutes. It remained in orbit until it decayed and reentered the atmosphere on 9 October 1974.

== See also ==
- 1974 in spaceflight
