= Kosmos 665 =

Soviet military early warning satellite

- Mission type: Early warning
- COSPAR ID: 1974-050A
- SATCAT no.: 7352
- Mission duration: 4 years

Spacecraft properties
- Spacecraft type: US-K
- Launch mass: 1,900 kilograms (4,200 lb)

Start of mission
- Launch date: 29 June 1974, 15:59 UTC
- Rocket: Molniya-M/2BL
- Launch site: Plesetsk Cosmodrome

End of mission
- Deactivated: 7 September 1975
- Decay date: 6 July 1990

Orbital parameters
- Reference system: Geocentric
- Regime: Molniya
- Perigee altitude: 659 kilometres (409 mi)
- Apogee altitude: 39,689 kilometres (24,662 mi)
- Inclination: 62.7 degrees
- Period: 717.66 minutes

Kosmos 665 (Russian: Космос 665 meaning Cosmos 665) was a Soviet US-K missile early warning satellite which was launched in 1974 as part of the Soviet military's Oko programme. The satellite was designed to identify missile launches using optical telescopes and infrared sensors.

Kosmos 665 was launched from Site 41/1 at Plesetsk Cosmodrome in the Russian SSR. A Molniya-M carrier rocket with a 2BL upper stage was used to perform the launch, which took place at 15:59 UTC on 29 June 1974. The launch successfully placed the satellite into a molniya orbit. It subsequently received its Kosmos designation, and the international designator 1974-050A. The United States Space Command assigned it the Satellite Catalog Number 7352.

It re-entered the Earth's atmosphere on 6 July 1990.

== See also ==
- List of Kosmos satellites (501–750)
- List of R-7 launches (1970–1974)
- 1974 in spaceflight
- List of Oko satellites
