= Kosmos 686 =

Soviet satellite (launched 1974)

- Mission type: ABM radar target
- COSPAR ID: 1974-074A
- SATCAT no.: 07447

Spacecraft properties
- Spacecraft type: DS-P1-Yu
- Manufacturer: Yuzhnoye
- Launch mass: 400 kilograms (880 lb)

Start of mission
- Launch date: 26 September 1974, 16:34:56 UTC
- Rocket: Kosmos-2I 63SM
- Launch site: Plesetsk 133/1

End of mission
- Decay date: 1 May 1975

Orbital parameters
- Reference system: Geocentric
- Regime: Low Earth
- Perigee altitude: 266 kilometres (165 mi)
- Apogee altitude: 461 kilometres (286 mi)
- Inclination: 70.9 degrees
- Period: 91.8 minutes

Kosmos 686 (Russian: Космос 686 meaning Cosmos 686), also known as DS-P1-Yu No.72, was a Soviet satellite which was launched in 1974 as part of the Dnepropetrovsk Sputnik programme. It was a 400-kilogram (880 lb) spacecraft, which was built by the Yuzhnoye Design Bureau, and was used as a radar calibration target for anti-ballistic missile tests.

A Kosmos-2I 63SM carrier rocket was used to launch Kosmos 686 from Site 133/1 of the Plesetsk Cosmodrome. The launch occurred at 16:34:56 UTC on 26 September 1974, and resulted in the satellite successfully reaching low Earth orbit. Upon reaching orbit, the satellite was assigned its Kosmos designation, and received the International Designator 1974-074A. The North American Aerospace Defense Command assigned it the catalogue number 07447.

Kosmos 686 was the seventy-second of seventy nine DS-P1-Yu satellites to be launched, and the sixty-fifth of seventy two to successfully reach orbit. It was operated in an orbit with a perigee of 266 kilometres (165 mi), an apogee of 461 kilometres (286 mi), 70.9 degrees of inclination, and an orbital period of 91.8 minutes. It remained in orbit until it decayed and reentered the atmosphere on 1 May 1975.

== See also ==
- 1974 in spaceflight
