= Kosmos 695 =

Soviet radar calibration satellite

- Mission type: ABM radar target
- COSPAR ID: 1974-091A
- SATCAT no.: 07538

Spacecraft properties
- Spacecraft type: DS-P1-Yu
- Manufacturer: Yuzhnoye
- Launch mass: 400 kilograms (880 lb)

Start of mission
- Launch date: 20 November 1974, 11:59:58 UTC
- Rocket: Kosmos-2I 63SM
- Launch site: Plesetsk 133/1

End of mission
- Decay date: 15 July 1975

Orbital parameters
- Reference system: Geocentric
- Regime: Low Earth
- Perigee altitude: 268 kilometres (167 mi)
- Apogee altitude: 449 kilometres (279 mi)
- Inclination: 70.9 degrees
- Period: 91.7 minutes

Kosmos 695 (Russian: Космос 695 meaning Cosmos 695), also known as DS-P1-Yu No.73, was a Soviet satellite which was launched in 1974 as part of the Dnepropetrovsk Sputnik programme. It was a 400-kilogram (880 lb) spacecraft, which was built by the Yuzhnoye Design Bureau, and was used as a radar calibration target for anti-ballistic missile tests.

A Kosmos-2I 63SM carrier rocket was used to launch Kosmos 695 from Site 133/1 of the Plesetsk Cosmodrome. The launch occurred at 11:59:58 UTC on 20 November 1974, and resulted in the satellite successfully reaching low Earth orbit. Upon reaching orbit, the satellite was assigned its Kosmos designation, and received the International Designator 1974-091A. The North American Aerospace Defense Command assigned it the catalogue number 07538.

Kosmos 695 was the seventy-third of seventy nine DS-P1-Yu satellites to be launched, and the sixty-sixth of seventy two to successfully reach orbit. It was operated in an orbit with a perigee of 268 kilometres (167 mi), an apogee of 449 kilometres (279 mi), 70.9 degrees of inclination, and an orbital period of 91.7 minutes. It remained in orbit until it decayed and reentered the atmosphere on 15 July 1975.

== See also ==
- 1974 in spaceflight
