= List of R-7 launches (1970–1974) =

This is a list of launches made by the R-7 Semyorka ICBM, and its derivatives between 1970 and 1974. All launches are orbital satellite launches, unless stated otherwise.

| Date and time (GMT) | Configuration | Serial number | Launch site | Result | Payload | Remarks |
|---|---|---|---|---|---|---|
== 1970 ==
| 9 January 1970, 09:20 | Voskhod (11A57) | | LC-31/6, Baikonur | Successful | Kosmos 318 (Zenit-2M) | |
| 21 January 1970, 12:00 | Voskhod (11A57) | | LC-41/1, Plesetsk | Successful | Kosmos 322 (Zenit-4) | |
| 10 February 1970, 12:00 | Voskhod (11A57) | | LC-41/1, Plesetsk | Successful | Kosmos 323 (Zenit-4) | |
| 19 February 1970, 18:57 | Molniya-M (8K78M) | | LC-43/4, Plesetsk | Successful | Molniya-1-13 | |
| 4 March 1970, 12:14 | Voskhod (11A57) | | LC-43/4, Plesetsk | Successful | Kosmos 325 (Zenit-2) | |
| 13 March 1970, 08:00 | Voskhod (11A57) | | LC-43/4, Plesetsk | Successful | Kosmos 326 (Zenit-2) | |
| 17 March 1970, 11:10 | Vostok-2M (8A92M) | | LC-41/1, Plesetsk | Successful | Meteor-1-3 | |
| 27 March 1970, 11:45 | Voskhod (11A57) | | LC-41/1, Plesetsk | Successful | Kosmos 328 (Zenit-4MK) | |
| 3 April 1970, 08:30 | Voskhod (11A57) | | LC-43/4, Plesetsk | Successful | Kosmos 329 (Zenit-2M) | |
| 8 April 1970, 10:15 | Voskhod (11A57) | | LC-31/6, Baikonur | Successful | Kosmos 331 (Zenit-4) | |
| 15 April 1970, 09:00 | Voskhod (11A57) | | LC-41/1, Plesetsk | Successful | Kosmos 333 (Zenit-4M) | |
| 28 April 1970, 10:50 | Vostok-2M (8A92M) | | LC-41/1, Plesetsk | Successful | Meteor-1-4 | |
| 12 May 1970, 10:10 | Voskhod (11A57) | | LC-41/1, Plesetsk | Successful | Kosmos 344 (Zenit-2) | |
| 20 May 1970, 09:20 | Voskhod (11A57) | | LC-31/6, Baikonur | Successful | Kosmos 345 (Zenit-4) | |
| 1 June 1970, 19:00 | Soyuz (11A511) | | LC-31/6, Baikonur | Successful | Soyuz 9 | Crewed orbital flight, two cosmonauts |
| 10 June 1970, 09:30 | Voskhod (11A57) | | LC-31/6, Baikonur | Successful | Kosmos 346 (Zenit-4) | |
| 17 June 1970, 12:59 | Voskhod (11A57) | | LC-43/4, Plesetsk | Successful | Kosmos 349 (Zenit-4) | |
| 23 June 1970, 14:15 | Vostok-2M (8A92M) | | LC-41/1, Plesetsk | Successful | Meteor-1-5 | |
| 26 June 1970, 03:23 | Molniya-M (8K78M) | | LC-43/4, Plesetsk | Successful | Molniya-1-14 | |
| 26 June 1970, 12:00 | Voskhod (11A57) | | LC-31/6, Baikonur | Successful | Kosmos 350 (Zenit-2M) | |
| 7 July 1970, 10:30 | Voskhod (11A57) | | LC-31/6, Baikonur | Successful | Kosmos 352 (Zenit-4) | |
| 9 July 1970, 13:35 | Voskhod (11A57) | | LC-41/1, Plesetsk | Successful | Kosmos 353 (Zenit-2M) | |
| 21 July 1970, 12:30 | Voskhod (11A57) | | LC-43/4, Plesetsk | Failure | Zenit-4 | Depressurization of the gyroscope package led to loss of control at T+146 seconds |
| 7 August 1970, 09:30 | Voskhod (11A57) | | LC-43/4, Plesetsk | Successful | Kosmos 355 (Zenit-4) | |
| 17 August 1970, 05:38 | Molniya-M (8K78M) | | LC-31/6, Baikonur | Successful | Venera 7 | |
| 22 August 1970, 05:06 | Molniya-M (8K78M) | | LC-31/6, Baikonur | Failure | Kosmos 359 (Venera 3V (V-70)) | The escape stage Block L's engine 11D33 was late igniting and cut off early at 25 seconds after firing due to abnormal operation of the sequencer and a DC transformer failure. |
| 29 August 1970, 08:30 | Voskhod (11A57) | | LC-31/6, Baikonur | Successful | Kosmos 360 (Zenit-4M) | |
| 8 September 1970, 10:30 | Voskhod (11A57) | | LC-41/1, Plesetsk | Successful | Kosmos 361 (Zenit-4M) | |
| 17 September 1970, 08:10 | Voskhod (11A57) | | LC-31/6, Baikonur | Successful | Kosmos 363 (Zenit-2M) | |
| 22 September 1970, 13:00 | Voskhod (11A57) | | LC-41/1, Plesetsk | Successful | Kosmos 364 (Zenit-4MK) | |
| 29 September 1970, 08:14 | Molniya-M (8K78M) | | LC-43/4, Plesetsk | Successful | Molniya-1-15 | |
| 1 October 1970, 08:20 | Voskhod (11A57) | | LC-1/5, Baikonur | Successful | Kosmos 366 (Zenit-2M) | |
| 8 October 1970, 12:39 | Voskhod (11A57) | | LC-31/6, Baikonur | Successful | Kosmos 368 (Zenit-2M) | |
| 9 October 1970, 11:04 | Voskhod (11A57) | | LC-1/5, Baikonur | Successful | Kosmos 370 (Zenit-4M) | |
| 15 October 1970, 11:22 | Vostok-2M (8A92M) | | LC-41/1, Plesetsk | Successful | Meteor-1-6 | |
| 30 October 1970, 13:20 | Voskhod (11A57) | | LC-43/4, Plesetsk | Successful | Kosmos 376 (Zenit-4M) | |
| 11 November 1970, 09:20 | Voskhod (11A57) | | LC-31/6, Baikonur | Successful | Kosmos 377 (Zenit-2M) | |
| 24 November 1970, 05:15 | Soyuz-L (11A511L) | | LC-31/6, Baikonur | Successful | Kosmos 379 (Lunny Korabl) | Test of the LK lunar lander in Earth orbit. |
| 27 November 1970, 15:47 | Molniya-M (8K78M) | | LC-43/4, Plesetsk | Successful | Molniya-1-16 | |
| 3 December 1970, 13:55 | Voskhod (11A57) | | LC-43/4, Plesetsk | Successful | Kosmos 383 (Zenit-4MK) | |
| 10 December 1970, 11:10 | Voskhod (11A57) | | LC-41/1, Plesetsk | Successful | Kosmos 384 (Zenit-2M) | |
| 15 December 1970, 10:00 | Voskhod (11A57) | | LC-31/6, Baikonur | Successful | Kosmos 386 (Zenit-4M) | |
| 18 December 1970, 16:15 | Vostok-2M (8A92M) | | LC-41/1, Plesetsk | Successful | Kosmos 389 (Tselina-D) | |
| 25 December 1970, 03:50 | Molniya-M (8K78M) | | LC-1/5, Baikonur | Successful | Molniya-1-17 | |
== 1971 ==
| 12 January 1971, 09:30 | Voskhod (11A57) | | LC-31/6, Baikonur | Successful | Kosmos 390 (Zenit-4M) | |
| 20 January 1971, 11:24 | Vostok-2M (8A92M) | | LC-41/1, Plesetsk | Successful | Meteor-1-7 | |
| 21 January 1971, 08:40 | Voskhod (11A57) | | LC-31/6, Baikonur | Successful | Kosmos 392 (Zenit-2M) | |
| 18 February 1971, 13:59 | Voskhod (11A57) | | LC-43/3, Plesetsk | Successful | Kosmos 396 (Zenit-4M) | |
| 26 February 1971, 05:06 | Soyuz-L (11A511L) | | LC-31/6, Baikonur | Successful | Kosmos 398 (Lunny Korabl) | Test of the LK lunar lander in Earth orbit. |
| 3 March 1971, 09:30 | Voskhod (11A57) | | LC-31/6, Baikonur | Successful | Kosmos 399 (Zenit-4M) | |
| 5 March 1971, 01:02 | Voskhod (11A57) | | LC-43/4, Plesetsk | Failure | Zenit-2M | Power failure at strap-on separation |
| 27 March 1971, 10:59 | Voskhod (11A57) | | LC-43/3, Plesetsk | Successful | Kosmos 401 (Zenit-4M) | |
| 2 April 1971, 08:20 | Voskhod (11A57) | | LC-43/3, Plesetsk | Successful | Kosmos 403 (Zenit-2M) | |
| 7 April 1971, 07:10 | Vostok-2M (8A92M) | | LC-43/4, Plesetsk | Successful | Kosmos 405 (Tselina-D) | |
| 14 April 1971, 08:00 | Voskhod (11A57) | | LC-43/4, Plesetsk | Successful | Kosmos 406 (Zenit-4M) | |
| 17 April 1971, 11:44 | Vostok-2M (8A92M) | | LC-43/4, Plesetsk | Successful | Meteor-1-8 | |
| 22 April 1971, 23:54 | Soyuz (11A511) | | LC-1/5, Baikonur | Successful | Soyuz 10 | Crewed orbital flight, 3 cosmonauts Docking system malfunction prevented docking with Salyut 1 |
| 6 May 1971, 06:20 | Voskhod (11A57) | | LC-31/6, Baikonur | Successful | Kosmos 410 (Zenit-2M) | |
| 18 May 1971, 08:00 | Voskhod (11A57) | | LC-31/6, Baikonur | Successful | Kosmos 420 (Zenit-4M) | |
| 28 May 1971, 10:30 | Voskhod (11A57) | | LC-43/4, Plesetsk | Successful | Kosmos 424 (Zenit-4M) | |
| 6 June 1971, 04:55 | Soyuz (11A511) | | LC-1/5, Baikonur | Successful | Soyuz 11 | Crewed orbital flight, 3 cosmonauts First space station mission, docked with Salyut 1 Pressure leak during re-entry led to loss of crew |
| 11 June 1971, 10:00 | Voskhod (11A57) | | LC-43/4, Plesetsk | Successful | Kosmos 427 (Zenit-4MK) | |
| 24 June 1971, 07:59 | Voskhod (11A57) | | LC-31/6, Baikonur | Successful | Kosmos 428 (Zenit-2M) | |
| 25 June 1971, 10:30 | Voskhod (11A57) | | LC-43/3, Plesetsk | Failure | Zenit-4M | Electrical malfunction led to low thrust from Blok B strap-on. Booster crashed downrange at T+95 seconds. |
| 16 July 1971, 01:41 | Vostok-2M (8A92M) | | LC-43/4, Plesetsk | Successful | Meteor-1-9 | |
| 20 July 1971, 10:00 | Voskhod (11A57) | | LC-31/6, Baikonur | Successful | Kosmos 429 (Zenit-4M) | |
| 23 July 1971, 11:00 | Voskhod (11A57) | | LC-43/3, Plesetsk | Successful | Kosmos 430 (Zenit-4M) | |
| 28 July 1971, 03:29 | Molniya-M (8K78M) | | LC-43/4, Plesetsk | Successful | Molniya-1-18 | |
| 30 July 1971, 08:29 | Voskhod (11A57) | | LC-31/6, Baikonur | Successful | Kosmos 431 (Zenit-2M) | |
| 5 August 1971, 10:00 | Voskhod (11A57) | | LC-31/6, Baikonur | Successful | Kosmos 432 (Zenit-4M) | |
| 12 August 1971, 05:30 | Soyuz-L (11A511L) | | LC-31/6, Baikonur | Successful | Kosmos 434 (Lunny Korabl) | Test of the LK lunar lander in Earth orbit. |
| 19 August 1971, 06:30 | Voskhod (11A57) | | LC-31/6, Baikonur | Failure | Zenit-4M | Low thrust results in Blok V breaking off the stack at T+115 seconds and automatic shutdown command |
| 14 September 1971, 13:00 | Voskhod (11A57) | | LC-43/3, Plesetsk | Successful | Kosmos 438 (Zenit-4MK) | |
| 21 September 1971, 12:00 | Voskhod (11A57) | | LC-43/3, Plesetsk | Successful | Kosmos 439 (Zenit-2M) | |
| 28 September 1971, 07:40 | Voskhod (11A57) | | LC-31/6, Baikonur | Successful | Kosmos 441 (Zenit-4M) | |
| 29 September 1971, 11:30 | Voskhod (11A57) | | LC-43/3, Plesetsk | Successful | Kosmos 442 (Zenit-4M) | |
| 7 October 1971, 12:30 | Voskhod (11A57) | | LC-43/3, Plesetsk | Successful | Kosmos 443 (Zenit-2M) | |
| 14 October 1971, 09:00 | Voskhod (11A57) | | LC-31/6, Baikonur | Successful | Kosmos 452 (Zenit-4M) | |
| 2 November 1971, 14:25 | Voskhod (11A57) | | LC-41/1, Plesetsk | Successful | Kosmos 454 (Zenit-2M) | |
| 19 November 1971, 12:00 | Voskhod (11A57) | | LC-43/3, Plesetsk | Successful | Kosmos 456 (Zenit-4M) | |
| 24 November 1971, 09:30 | Molniya-M (8K78M) | | LC-43/4, Plesetsk | Successful | Molniya-2-1 | |
| 3 December 1971, 13:00 | Voskhod (11A57) | | LC-43/4, Plesetsk | Failure | Zenit-2M | Ingested debris caused the Blok A engines to shut down at liftoff. Launch vehicle crashed near the pad. |
| 6 December 1971, 09:50 | Voskhod (11A57) | | LC-31/6, Baikonur | Successful | Kosmos 463 (Zenit-4M) | |
| 10 December 1971, 11:00 | Voskhod (11A57) | | LC-43/3, Plesetsk | Successful | Kosmos 464 (Zenit-4M) | |
| 16 December 1971, 09:39 | Voskhod (11A57) | | LC-31/6, Baikonur | Successful | Kosmos 466 (Zenit-4M) | |
| 19 December 1971, 22:50 | Molniya-M (8K78M) | | LC-41/1, Plesetsk | Successful | Molniya-1-19 | |
| 27 December 1971, 14:04 | Soyuz-M (11A511M) | | LC-43/4, Plesetsk | Successful | Kosmos 470 (Zenit-4MT) | First flight of the Soyuz-M. |
| 29 December 1971, 10:50 | Vostok-2M (8A92M) | | LC-41/1, Plesetsk | Successful | Meteor-1-10 | |
== 1972 ==
| 12 January 1972, 09:59 | Voskhod (11A57) | | LC-31/6, Baikonur | Successful | Kosmos 471 (Zenit-4M) | |
| 3 February 1972, 08:40 | Voskhod (11A57) | | LC-31/6, Baikonur | Successful | Kosmos 473 (Zenit-2M) | |
| 16 February 1972, 09:30 | Voskhod (11A57) | | LC-31/6, Baikonur | Successful | Kosmos 474 (Zenit-4M) | |
| 1 March 1972, 11:15 | Vostok-2M (8A92M) | | LC-43/4, Plesetsk | Successful | Kosmos 476 (Tselina-D) | |
| 4 March 1972, 10:00 | Voskhod (11A57) | | LC-41/1, Plesetsk | Successful | Kosmos 477 (Zenit-2M) | |
| 15 March 1972, 13:00 | Voskhod (11A57) | | LC-43/3, Plesetsk | Successful | Kosmos 478 (Zenit-4M) | |
| 27 March 1972, 04:15 | Molniya-M (8K78M) | | LC-31/6, Baikonur | Successful | Venera 8 | |
| 30 March 1972, 14:05 | Vostok-2M (8A92M) | | LC-41/1, Plesetsk | Successful | Meteor-1-11 | |
| 31 March 1972, 04:02 | Molniya-M (8K78M) | | LC-31/6, Baikonur | Failure | Kosmos 482 (Venera 3V (V-72)) | The escape stage Block L's engine cut off 125 seconds after ignition due to timer failure. |
| 3 April 1972, 10:15 | Voskhod (11A57) | | LC-41/1, Plesetsk | Successful | Kosmos 483 (Zenit-4M) | |
| 4 April 1972, 20:38 | Molniya-M (8K78M) | | LC-43/4, Plesetsk | Successful | Molniya-1-20 | |
| 6 April 1972, 08:00 | Voskhod (11A57) | | LC-43/3, Plesetsk | Successful | Kosmos 484 (Zenit-2M) | |
| 7 April 1972, 10:00 | Voskhod (11A57) | | LC-31/6, Baikonur | Successful | Interkosmos 6 | |
| 14 April 1972, 00:54 | Molniya-M (8K78M) | | LC-31/6, Baikonur | Successful | Prognoz 1 | |
| 14 April 1972, 08:00 | Voskhod (11A57) | | LC-43/3, Plesetsk | Successful | Kosmos 486 (Zenit-4M) | |
| 5 May 1972, 11:20 | Voskhod (11A57) | | LC-43/4, Plesetsk | Successful | Kosmos 488 (Zenit-4MK) | |
| 17 May 1972, 10:19 | Voskhod (11A57) | | LC-43/3, Plesetsk | Successful | Kosmos 490 (Zenit-2M) | |
| 19 May 1972, 14:30 | Molniya-M (8K78M) | | LC-43/4, Plesetsk | Successful | Molniya-2-2 | |
| 25 May 1972, 06:35 | Voskhod (11A57) | | LC-31/6, Baikonur | Successful | Kosmos 491 (Zenit-4M) | |
| 9 June 1972, 06:59 | Voskhod (11A57) | | LC-31/6, Baikonur | Successful | Kosmos 492 (Zenit-4M) | |
| 21 June 1972, 06:25 | Voskhod (11A57) | | LC-31/6, Baikonur | Successful | Kosmos 493 (Zenit-2M) | |
| 23 June 1972, 11:19 | Voskhod (11A57) | | LC-43/3, Plesetsk | Successful | Kosmos 495 (Zenit-4M) | |
| 26 June 1972, 14:53 | Soyuz (11A511) | | LC-1/5, Baikonur | Successful | Kosmos 496 (Soyuz 7K-T) | Uncrewed test of redesigned Soyuz spacecraft |
| 29 June 1972, 03:47 | Molniya-M (8K78M) | | LC-31/6, Baikonur | Successful | Prognoz 2 | |
| 30 June 1972, 18:52 | Vostok-2M (8A92M) | | LC-41/1, Plesetsk | Successful | Meteor-1-12 | |
| 6 July 1972, 10:40 | Voskhod (11A57) | | LC-31/6, Baikonur | Successful | Kosmos 499 (Zenit-4M) | |
| 13 July 1972, 14:30 | Soyuz-M (11A511M) | | LC-43/4, Plesetsk | Successful | Kosmos 502 (Zenit-4MT) | |
| 19 July 1972, 13:45 | Voskhod (11A57) | | LC-43/3, Plesetsk | Successful | Kosmos 503 (Zenit-4M) | |
| 28 July 1972, 10:19 | Voskhod (11A57) | | LC-43/4, Plesetsk | Successful | Kosmos 512 (Zenit-2M) | |
| 2 August 1972, 08:15 | Voskhod (11A57) | | LC-31/6, Baikonur | Successful | Kosmos 513 (Zenit-4M) | |
| 18 August 1972, 10:00 | Voskhod (11A57) | | LC-43/4, Plesetsk | Successful | Kosmos 515 (Zenit-4MK) | |
| 30 August 1972, 08:19 | Voskhod (11A57) | | LC-31/6, Baikonur | Successful | Kosmos 517 (Zenit-2M) | |
| 2 September 1972, 10:50 | Voskhod (11A57) | | LC-43/4, Plesetsk | Failure | Zenit-4M | Vernier malfunction at T+85 seconds leading to control failure and launch vehicle breakup. |
| 15 September 1972, 09:40 | Voskhod (11A57) | | LC-43/4, Plesetsk | Successful | Kosmos 518 (Zenit-2M) | |
| 16 September 1972, 08:20 | Voskhod (11A57) | | LC-31/6, Baikonur | Successful | Kosmos 519 (Zenit-4M) | |
| 19 September 1972, 19:19 | Molniya-M (8K78M) | | LC-41/1, Plesetsk | Successful | Kosmos 520 (Oko) | |
| 30 September 1972, 20:19 | Molniya-M (8K78M) | | LC-41/1, Plesetsk | Successful | Molniya-2-3 | |
| 4 October 1972, 12:00 | Voskhod (11A57) | | LC-41/1, Plesetsk | Successful | Kosmos 522 (Zenit-4M) | |
| 14 October 1972, 20:19 | Molniya-M (8K78M) | | LC-41/1, Plesetsk | Successful | Molniya-1-21 | |
| 18 October 1972, 11:59 | Voskhod (11A57) | | LC-43/4, Plesetsk | Successful | Kosmos 525 (Zenit-2M) | |
| 26 October 1972, 22:05 | Vostok-2M (8A92M) | | LC-43/4, Plesetsk | Successful | Meteor-1-13 | |
| 31 October 1972, 13:29 | Voskhod (11A57) | | LC-43/4, Plesetsk | Successful | Kosmos 527 (Zenit-4MK) | |
| 25 November 1972, 09:10 | Voskhod (11A57) | | LC-31/6, Baikonur | Successful | Kosmos 537 (Zenit-2M) | |
| 2 December 1972, 04:39 | Molniya-M (8K78M) | | LC-1/5, Baikonur | Successful | Molniya-1-22 | |
| 12 December 1972, 06:51 | Molniya-M (8K78M) | | LC-41/1, Plesetsk | Successful | Molniya-2-4 | |
| 14 December 1972, 13:40 | Voskhod (11A57) | | LC-43/4, Plesetsk | Successful | Kosmos 538 (Zenit-4M) | |
| 27 December 1972, 10:30 | Soyuz-M (11A511M) | | LC-41/1, Plesetsk | Successful | Kosmos 541 (Zenit-4MT) | |
| 28 December 1972, 11:00 | Vostok-2M (8A92M) | | LC-43/4, Plesetsk | Successful | Kosmos 542 (Tselina-D) | |
== 1973 ==
| 11 January 1973, 10:00 | Voskhod (11A57) | | LC-31/6, Baikonur | Successful | Kosmos 543 (Zenit-4M) | |
| 1 February 1973, 08:30 | Voskhod (11A57) | | LC-31/6, Baikonur | Successful | Kosmos 547 (Zenit-2M) | |
| 3 February 1973, 05:48 | Molniya-M (8K78M) | | LC-1/5, Baikonur | Successful | Molniya 1-23 | |
| 8 February 1973, 13:15 | Voskhod (11A57) | | LC-43/4, Plesetsk | Successful | Kosmos 548 (Zenit-4M) | |
| 15 February 1973, 01:11 | Molniya-M (8K78M) | | LC-31/6, Baikonur | Successful | Prognoz-3 | |
| 1 March 1973, 12:40 | Voskhod (11A57) | | LC-41/1, Plesetsk | Successful | Kosmos 550 (Zenit-4MK) | |
| 6 March 1973, 09:20 | Voskhod (11A57) | | LC-31/6, Baikonur | Successful | Kosmos 551 (Zenit-4M) | |
| 20 March 1973, 11:20 | Vostok-2M (8A92M) | | LC-41/1, Plesetsk | Successful | Meteor 1-14 | |
| 22 March 1973, 10:00 | Voskhod (11A57) | | LC-43/3, Plesetsk | Successful | Kosmos 552 (Zenit-2M) | |
| 5 April 1973, 11:11 | Molniya-M (8K78M) | | LC-41/1, Plesetsk | Successful | Molniya 2-5 | |
| 19 April 1973, 08:59 | Voskhod (11A57) | | LC-43/4, Plesetsk | Successful | Kosmos 554 (Zenit-4MK) | |
| 25 April 1973, 10:45 | Voskhod (11A57) | | LC-43/4, Plesetsk | Successful | Kosmos 555 (Zenit-2M) | |
| 5 May 1973, 07:00 | Voskhod (11A57) | | LC-41/1, Plesetsk | Successful | Kosmos 556 (Zenit-4MK) | |
| 18 May 1973, 11:00 | Soyuz-U (11A511U) | | LC-43/3, Plesetsk | Successful | Kosmos 559 (Zenit-4MK) | Maiden flight of Soyuz-U 11A511U |
| 23 May 1973, 10:30 | Voskhod (11A57) | | LC-43/4, Plesetsk | Successful | Kosmos 560 (Zenit-4M) | |
| 25 May 1973, 13:30 | Voskhod (11A57) | | LC-43/4, Plesetsk | Successful | Kosmos 561 (Zenit-2M) | |
| 29 May 1973, 10:16 | Vostok-2M (8A92M) | | LC-41/1, Plesetsk | Successful | Meteor 1-15 | |
| 6 June 1973, 11:30 | Voskhod (11A57) | | LC-43/4, Plesetsk | Successful | Kosmos 563 (Zenit-4M) | |
| 10 June 1973, 10:10 | Voskhod (11A57) | | LC-1/5, Baikonur | Successful | Kosmos 572 (Zenit-4M) | |
| 15 June 1973, 06:00 | Soyuz (11A511) | | LC-1/5, Baikonur | Successful | Kosmos 573 (Soyuz 7K-T) | Uncrewed test of upgraded Soyuz spacecraft |
| 21 June 1973, 13:29 | Voskhod (11A57) | | LC-43/4, Plesetsk | Successful | Kosmos 575 (Zenit-2M) | |
| 27 June 1973, 11:50 | Soyuz-M (11A511M) | | LC-41/1, Plesetsk | Successful | Kosmos 576 (Zenit-4MT) | |
| 4 July 1973, 11:00 | Voskhod (11A57) | | LC-43/3, Plesetsk | Failure | Zenit-4M | Guidance programmer malfunction led to improper pitch setting, preventing the satellite from attaining orbital velocity |
| 11 July 1973, 09:58 | Molniya-M (8K78M) | | LC-41/1, Plesetsk | Successful | Molniya 2-6 | |
| 25 July 1973, 11:30 | Voskhod (11A57) | | LC-43/4, Plesetsk | Successful | Kosmos 577 (Zenit-4M) | |
| 1 August 1973, 14:00 | Voskhod (11A57) | | LC-43/4, Plesetsk | Successful | Kosmos 578 (Zenit-2M) | |
| 21 August 1973, 12:30 | Voskhod (11A57) | | LC-41/1, Plesetsk | Successful | Kosmos 579 (Zenit-4M) | |
| 24 August 1973, 10:59 | Voskhod (11A57) | | LC-1/5, Baikonur | Successful | Kosmos 581 (Zenit-4M) | |
| 30 August 1973, 00:07 | Molniya-M (8K78M) | | LC-41/1, Plesetsk | Successful | Molniya 1-24 | |
| 30 August 1973, 10:30 | Voskhod (11A57) | | LC-1/5, Baikonur | Successful | Kosmos 583 (Zenit-2M) | |
| 6 September 1973, 10:40 | Voskhod (11A57) | | LC-41/1, Plesetsk | Successful | Kosmos 584 (Zenit-4M) | |
| 21 September 1973, 13:05 | Soyuz-U (11A511U) | | LC-43/3, Plesetsk | Successful | Kosmos 587 (Zenit-4MK) | |
| 27 September 1973, 12:18 | Soyuz (11A511) | | LC-1/5, Baikonur | Successful | Soyuz 12 | Crewed orbital flight, 2 cosmonauts |
| 3 October 1973, 13:00 | Voskhod (11A57) | | LC-41/1, Plesetsk | Successful | Kosmos 596 (Zenit-2M) | Parachute failed to deploy |
| 6 October 1973, 12:30 | Voskhod (11A57) | | LC-41/1, Plesetsk | Successful | Kosmos 597 (Zenit-4MK) | |
| 10 October 1973, 10:45 | Voskhod (11A57) | | LC-41/1, Plesetsk | Successful | Kosmos 598 (Zenit-4M) | |
| 15 October 1973, 08:45 | Voskhod (11A57) | | LC-1/5, Baikonur | Successful | Kosmos 599 (Zenit-2M) | |
| 16 October 1973, 12:00 | Voskhod (11A57) | | LC-43/4, Plesetsk | Successful | Kosmos 600 (Zenit-4M) | |
| 19 October 1973, 10:26 | Molniya-M (8K78M) | | LC-41/1, Plesetsk | Successful | Molniya 2-7 | |
| 20 October 1973, 10:14 | Voskhod (11A57) | | LC-43/4, Plesetsk | Successful | Kosmos 602 (Zenit-4MK) | |
| 27 October 1973, 11:09 | Voskhod (11A57) | | LC-41/1, Plesetsk | Successful | Kosmos 603 (Zenit-4M) | |
| 29 October 1973, 14:00 | Vostok-2M (8A92M) | | LC-43/4, Plesetsk | Successful | Kosmos 604 (Tselina-D) | |
| 31 October 1973, 18:24 | Soyuz-U (11A511U) | | LC-43/3, Plesetsk | Successful | Kosmos 605 (Bion 1) | |
| 2 November 1973, 13:01 | Molniya-M (8K78M) | | LC-41/1, Plesetsk | Successful | Kosmos 606 (Oko) | |
| 10 November 1973, 12:38 | Voskhod (11A57) | | LC-43/4, Plesetsk | Successful | Kosmos 607 (Zenit-4MK) | |
| 14 November 1973, 20:40 | Molniya-M (8K78M) | | LC-1/5, Baikonur | Successful | Molniya 1-25 | |
| 21 November 1973, 10:00 | Voskhod (11A57) | | LC-1/5, Baikonur | Successful | Kosmos 609 (Zenit-4M) | |
| 28 November 1973, 11:43 | Voskhod (11A57) | | LC-43/4, Plesetsk | Successful | Kosmos 612 (Zenit-4MK) | |
| 30 November 1973, 05:20 | Soyuz (11A511) | | LC-1/5, Baikonur | Successful | Kosmos 613 (Soyuz 7K-T) | Uncrewed test of upgraded Soyuz spacecraft |
| 30 November 1973, 13:08 | Molniya-M (8K78M) | | LC-41/1, Plesetsk | Successful | Molniya 1-26 | |
| 17 December 1973, 12:00 | Soyuz-M (11A511M) | | LC-41/1, Plesetsk | Successful | Kosmos 616 (Zenit-4MT) | |
| 18 December 1973, 11:55 | Soyuz (11A511) | | LC-1/5, Baikonur | Successful | Soyuz 13 | Crewed orbital flight, 2 cosmonauts |
| 21 December 1973, 12:30 | Voskhod (11A57) | | LC-43/4, Plesetsk | Successful | Kosmos 625 (Zenit-4MK) | |
| 25 December 1973, 11:17 | Molniya-M (8K78M) | | LC-41/1, Plesetsk | Successful | Molniya 2-8 | |
== 1974 ==
| 24 January 1974, 15:00 | Voskhod (11A57) | | LC-43/4, Plesetsk | Successful | Kosmos 629 (Zenit-2M) | |
| 30 January 1974, 11:00 | Voskhod (11A57) | | LC-43/4, Plesetsk | Successful | Kosmos 630 (Zenit-4MK) | |
| 12 February 1974, 08:56 | Voskhod (11A57) | | LC-31/6, Baikonur | Successful | Kosmos 632 (Zenit-4M) | |
| 5 March 1974, 11:38 | Vostok-2M (8A92M) | | LC-43/4, Plesetsk | Successful | Meteor 1-16 | |
| 14 March 1974, 10:30 | Voskhod (11A57) | | LC-43/4, Plesetsk | Successful | Kosmos 635 (Zenit-2M) | |
| 20 March 1974, 08:30 | Soyuz-U (11A511U) | | LC-31/6, Baikonur | Successful | Kosmos 636 (Zenit-4MK) | |
| 3 April 1974, 07:30 | Soyuz-U (11A511U) | | LC-31/6, Baikonur | Successful | Kosmos 638 (Soyuz 7K-TM) | Uncrewed test of upgraded Soyuz spacecraft for the Apollo–Soyuz Test Project. |
| 4 April 1974, 08:30 | Voskhod (11A57) | | LC-41/1, Plesetsk | Successful | Kosmos 639 (Zenit-4MK) | |
| 11 April 1974, 12:23 | Voskhod (11A57) | | LC-43/4, Plesetsk | Successful | Kosmos 640 (Zenit-2M) | |
| 12 April 1974, 08:00 | Voskhod (11A57) | | LC-31/6, Baikonur | Failure | Zenit-4MK | Blok I flight control malfunction results in incorrect trajectory and automatic shutdown T+296 seconds |
| 20 April 1974, 20:53 | Molniya-M (8K78M) | | LC-43/4, Plesetsk | Successful | Molniya-1-27 | |
| 24 April 1974, 11:50 | Vostok-2M (8A92M) | | LC-43/4, Plesetsk | Successful | Meteor 1-17 | |
| 26 April 1974, 14:23 | Molniya-M (8K78M) | | LC-41/1, Plesetsk | Successful | Molniya-2-9 | |
| 29 April 1974, 13:30 | Voskhod (11A57) | | LC-43/4, Plesetsk | Successful | Kosmos 649 (Zenit-4MK) | |
| 15 May 1974, 08:30 | Soyuz-U (11A511U) | | LC-31/6, Baikonur | Successful | Kosmos 652 (Zenit-4MK) | |
| 15 May 1974, 12:30 | Voskhod (11A57) | | LC-43/4, Plesetsk | Successful | Kosmos 653 (Zenit-2M) | |
| 23 May 1974, 12:17 | Soyuz-U (11A511U) | | LC-43/3, Plesetsk | Failure | Yantar-2K | Block I staging failed. The booster reentered the atmosphere and broke up. First flight of the Yantar satellite. |
| 27 May 1974, 07:20 | Soyuz (11A511) | | LC-1/5, Baikonur | Successful | Kosmos 656 (Soyuz 7K-T) | Uncrewed test of upgraded Soyuz spacecraft. |
| 30 May 1974, 12:45 | Voskhod (11A57) | | LC-43/4, Plesetsk | Successful | Kosmos 657 (Zenit-4MK) | |
| 6 June 1974, 06:20 | Voskhod (11A57) | | LC-31/6, Baikonur | Successful | Kosmos 658 (Zenit-2M) | |
| 13 June 1974, 12:30 | Voskhod (11A57) | | LC-43/4, Plesetsk | Successful | Kosmos 659 (Zenit-4MK) | |
| 29 June 1974, 12:50 | Soyuz-M (11A511M) | | LC-43/4, Plesetsk | Successful | Kosmos 664 (Zenit-4MT) | |
| 29 June 1974, 15:59 | Molniya-M (8K78M) | | LC-41/1, Plesetsk | Successful | Kosmos 665 (Oko) | |
| 3 July 1974, 18:51 | Soyuz (11A511) | | LC-1/5, Baikonur | Successful | Soyuz 14 | Crewed orbital flight, 2 cosmonauts Docked with Salyut 3 |
| 9 July 1974, 14:40 | Vostok-2M (8A92M) | | LC-43/4, Plesetsk | Successful | Meteor 1-18 (Meteor-Priroda 1) | |
| 12 July 1974, 12:50 | Voskhod (11A57) | | LC-43/4, Plesetsk | Successful | Kosmos 666 (Zenit-4MK) | |
| 23 July 1974, 01:23 | Molniya-M (8K78M) | | LC-43/4, Plesetsk | Successful | Molniya-2-10 | |
| 25 July 1974, 07:00 | Voskhod (11A57) | | LC-31/6, Baikonur | Successful | Kosmos 667 (Zenit-4M) | |
| 26 July 1974, 07:00 | Voskhod (11A57) | | LC-43/4, Plesetsk | Successful | Kosmos 669 (Zenit-2M) | |
| 6 August 1974, 00:02 | Soyuz-U (11A511U) | | LC-1/5, Baikonur | Successful | Kosmos 670 (Soyuz-S) | Uncrewed test flight of the military version of the Soyuz spacecraft |
| 7 August 1974, 12:50 | Voskhod (11A57) | | LC-43/4, Plesetsk | Successful | Kosmos 671 (Zenit-4MK) | |
| 12 August 1974, 06:25 | Soyuz-U (11A511U) | | LC-31/6, Baikonur | Successful | Kosmos 672 (Soyuz 7K-TM) | Uncrewed test of upgraded Soyuz spacecraft for the Apollo–Soyuz Test Project |
| 16 August 1974, 03:41 | Vostok-2M (8A92M) | | LC-43/4, Plesetsk | Successful | Kosmos 673 (Tselina-D) | |
| 26 August 1974, 19:58 | Soyuz (11A511) | | LC-1/5, Baikonur | Successful | Soyuz 15 | Crewed orbital flight, 2 cosmonauts Failed to dock with Salyut 3 |
| 29 August 1974, 07:39 | Voskhod (11A57) | | LC-31/6, Baikonur | Successful | Kosmos 674 (Zenit-4MK) | |
| 30 August 1974, 12:50 | Voskhod (11A57) | | LC-41/1, Plesetsk | Failure | Zenit-2M | Loss of hydrogen peroxide lubricant led to Blok A engine failure at T+249 seconds |
| 20 September 1974, 09:30 | Voskhod (11A57) | | LC-31/6, Baikonur | Successful | Kosmos 685 (Zenit-2M) | |
| 18 October 1974, 15:00 | Voskhod (11A57) | | LC-41/1, Plesetsk | Successful | Kosmos 688 (Zenit-4MK) | |
| 22 October 1974, 18:00 | Soyuz-U (11A511U) | | LC-43/4, Plesetsk | Successful | Kosmos 690 (Bion 2) | |
| 24 October 1974, 12:39 | Molniya-M (8K78M) | | LC-41/1, Plesetsk | Successful | Molniya-1-28 | |
| 25 October 1974, 09:30 | Soyuz-U (11A511U) | | LC-31/6, Baikonur | Successful | Kosmos 691 (Zenit-4MK) | |
| 28 October 1974, 10:17 | Vostok-2M (8A92M) | | LC-43/4, Plesetsk | Successful | Meteor 1-19 | |
| 1 November 1974, 14:20 | Voskhod (11A57) | | LC-43/4, Plesetsk | Successful | Kosmos 692 (Zenit-2M) | |
| 4 November 1974, 10:40 | Soyuz-M (11A511M) | | LC-41/1, Plesetsk | Successful | Kosmos 693 (Zenit-4MT) | |
| 16 November 1974, 11:45 | Voskhod (11A57) | | LC-43/4, Plesetsk | Successful | Kosmos 694 (Zenit-4MK) | |
| 21 November 1974, 10:33 | Molniya-M (8K78M) | | LC-41/1, Plesetsk | Successful | Molniya-3-1 | |
| 27 November 1974, 11:45 | Voskhod (11A57) | | LC-43/4, Plesetsk | Successful | Kosmos 696 (Zenit-2M) | |
| 2 December 1974, 09:40 | Soyuz-U (11A511U) | | LC-1/5, Baikonur | Successful | Soyuz 16 | Crewed orbital flight, 2 cosmonauts ASTP dress-rehearsal First crewed use of Soyuz-U 11A511U |
| 13 December 1974, 13:30 | Soyuz-U (11A511U) | | LC-43/3, Plesetsk | Successful | Kosmos 697 (Yantar-2K) | |
| 17 December 1974, 11:45 | Vostok-2M (8A92M) | | LC-43/4, Plesetsk | Successful | Meteor 1-20 | |
| 21 December 1974, 02:19 | Molniya-M (8K78M) | | LC-41/1, Plesetsk | Successful | Molniya-2-11 | |
| 27 December 1974, 09:10 | Voskhod (11A57) | | LC-31/6, Baikonur | Successful | Kosmos 701 (Zenit-4MK) | |
