= Kosmos 501 =

Soviet satellite

- Mission type: ABM radar target
- COSPAR ID: 1972-054A
- SATCAT no.: 06099

Spacecraft properties
- Spacecraft type: DS-P1-Yu
- Manufacturer: Yuzhnoye
- Launch mass: 250 kilograms (550 lb)

Start of mission
- Launch date: 12 July 1972, 05:59:57 UTC
- Rocket: Kosmos-2I 63SM
- Launch site: Kapustin Yar 86/4

End of mission
- Decay date: 9 May 1974

Orbital parameters
- Reference system: Geocentric
- Regime: Low Earth
- Perigee altitude: 215 kilometres (134 mi)
- Apogee altitude: 2,071 kilometres (1,287 mi)
- Inclination: 48.4 degrees
- Period: 108.2 minutes

Kosmos 501 (Russian: Космос 501 meaning Cosmos 501), known before launch as DS-P1-Yu No.50, was a Soviet satellite which was launched in 1972 as part of the Dnepropetrovsk Sputnik programme. It was a 250-kilogram (550 lb) spacecraft, which was built by the Yuzhnoye Design Bureau, and was used as a radar calibration target for anti-ballistic missile tests.

Kosmos 501 was successfully launched into low Earth orbit at 05:59:57 UTC on 12 July, 1972. The launch took place from Site 86/4 at Kapustin Yar, and used a Kosmos-2I 63SM carrier rocket. It was the last DS-P1-Yu satellite to be launched from Kapustin Yar. Upon reaching orbit, the satellite was assigned its Kosmos designation, and received the International Designator 1972-054A. The North American Aerospace Defense Command assigned it the catalogue number 06099.

Kosmos 501 was the fifty-sixth of seventy nine DS-P1-Yu satellites to be launched, and the fiftieth of seventy two to successfully reach orbit. It was operated in an orbit with a perigee of 215 kilometres (134 mi), an apogee of 2,071 kilometres (1,287 mi), 48.4 degrees of inclination, and an orbital period of 108.2 minutes. It remained in orbit until it decayed and reentered the atmosphere on 9 May 1974.

== See also ==
- 1972 in spaceflight
