= Kosmos 662 =

Soviet anti-ballistic missile test target

- Mission type: ABM radar target
- COSPAR ID: 1974-047A
- SATCAT no.: 07347

Spacecraft properties
- Spacecraft type: DS-P1-I
- Manufacturer: Yuzhnoye
- Launch mass: 400 kilograms (880 lb)

Start of mission
- Launch date: 26 June 1974, 12:30 UTC
- Rocket: Kosmos-2I 63SM
- Launch site: Plesetsk 133/1

End of mission
- Decay date: 28 August 1976

Orbital parameters
- Reference system: Geocentric
- Regime: Low Earth
- Perigee altitude: 271 kilometres (168 mi)
- Apogee altitude: 812 kilometres (505 mi)
- Inclination: 70.9 degrees
- Period: 95.5 minutes

Kosmos 662 (Russian: Космос 662 meaning Cosmos 662), also known as DS-P1-I No.14 was a satellite which was used as a radar target for anti-ballistic missile tests. It was launched by the Soviet Union in 1974 as part of the Dnepropetrovsk Sputnik programme.

It was launched aboard a Kosmos-2I 63SM rocket, from Site 133/1 at Plesetsk. The launch occurred at 12:30 UTC on 26 June 1974.

Kosmos 662 was placed into a low Earth orbit with a perigee of 271 kilometres (168 mi), an apogee of 812 kilometres (505 mi), 70.9 degrees of inclination, and an orbital period of 95.5 minutes. It decayed from orbit on 28 August 1976.

Kosmos 662 was the fourteenth of nineteen DS-P1-I satellites to be launched. Of these, all reached orbit successfully except the seventh.

== See also ==
- 1974 in spaceflight
