= Kosmos 606 =

Soviet military early warning satellite

- Mission type: Early warning
- COSPAR ID: 1973-084A
- SATCAT no.: 6916
- Mission duration: 52 years, 9 months, 17 days (in orbit)

Spacecraft properties
- Spacecraft type: US-K
- Launch mass: 1,900 kilograms (4,200 lb)

Start of mission
- Launch date: 2 November 1973, 13:01 UTC
- Rocket: Molniya-M/2BL
- Launch site: Plesetsk Cosmodrome

End of mission
- Deactivated: 30 April 1974

Orbital parameters
- Reference system: Geocentric
- Regime: Molniya
- Perigee altitude: 658 kilometres (409 mi)
- Apogee altitude: 39,687 kilometres (24,660 mi)
- Inclination: 62.7 degrees
- Period: 717.60 minutes

Kosmos 606 (Russian: Космос 606 or Cosmos 606) was a Soviet US-K missile early warning satellite which was launched in 1973 as part of the Soviet military's Oko programme. The satellite was designed to identify missile launches using optical telescopes and infrared sensors.

== Launch ==
Kosmos 606 was launched from Site 41/1 at Plesetsk Cosmodrome in the Russian SSR. A Molniya-M carrier rocket with a 2BL upper stage was used to perform the launch, which took place at 13:01 UTC on 2 November 1973.

== Orbit ==
The launch successfully placed the satellite into a molniya orbit. It subsequently received its Kosmos designation, and the international designator 1973-084A . The United States Space Command assigned it the Satellite Catalog Number 6916.

== See also ==
- List of Kosmos satellites (501–750)
- List of R-7 launches (1970-1974)
- 1973 in spaceflight
- List of Oko satellites
