= Kosmos 520 =

Soviet military early warning satellite

- Mission type: Early warning
- COSPAR ID: 1972-072A
- SATCAT no.: 06192
- Mission duration: 53 years, 11 months (in orbit)

Spacecraft properties
- Spacecraft type: US-K
- Launch mass: 1,900 kilograms (4,200 lb)

Start of mission
- Launch date: 19 September 1972, 19:19 UTC
- Rocket: Molniya-M/2BL
- Launch site: Plesetsk Cosmodrome

Orbital parameters
- Reference system: Geocentric
- Regime: Molniya
- Perigee altitude: 741 kilometres (460 mi)
- Apogee altitude: 39,477 kilometres (24,530 mi)
- Inclination: 62.8 degrees
- Period: 715.03 minutes

Kosmos 520 (Russian: Космос 520 meaning Cosmos 520) was the first Soviet US-K missile early warning satellite. It was launched in 1972 as part of the Oko programme. The satellite is designed to identify missile launches using optical telescopes and infrared sensors.

Kosmos 520 was launched from Site 41/1 at Plesetsk Cosmodrome in the Soviet Union. A Molniya-M carrier rocket with a 2BL upper stage was used to perform the launch, which took place at 19:19 UTC on 19 September 1972. The launch successfully placed the satellite into a molniya orbit. It subsequently received its Kosmos designation, and the international designator 1972-072A. The United States Space Command assigned it the Satellite Catalog Number 06192.

== See also ==
- List of Kosmos satellites (501–750)
- List of R-7 launches (1970-1974)
- 1972 in spaceflight
