= Kosmos 524 =

Soviet radar calibration satellite

- Mission type: ABM radar target
- COSPAR ID: 1972-080A
- SATCAT no.: 06229

Spacecraft properties
- Spacecraft type: DS-P1-Yu
- Manufacturer: Yuzhnoye
- Launch mass: 325 kilograms (717 lb)

Start of mission
- Launch date: 11 October 1972, 13:19:58 UTC
- Rocket: Kosmos-2I 63SM
- Launch site: Plesetsk 133/1

End of mission
- Decay date: 25 March 1973

Orbital parameters
- Reference system: Geocentric
- Regime: Low Earth
- Perigee altitude: 259 kilometres (161 mi)
- Apogee altitude: 476 kilometres (296 mi)
- Inclination: 70.9 degrees
- Period: 91.9 minutes

Kosmos 524 (Russian: Космос 524 meaning Cosmos 524), known before launch as DS-P1-Yu No.49, was a Soviet satellite which was launched in 1972 as part of the Dnepropetrovsk Sputnik programme. It was a 325-kilogram (717 lb) spacecraft, which was built by the Yuzhnoye Design Bureau, and was used as a radar calibration target for anti-ballistic missile tests.

Kosmos 524 was successfully launched into low Earth orbit at 13:19:58 UTC on 11 October 1972. The launch took place from Site 133/1 at the Plesetsk Cosmodrome, and used a Kosmos-2I 63SM carrier rocket. Upon reaching orbit, the satellite was assigned its Kosmos designation, and received the International Designator 1972-080A. The North American Aerospace Defense Command assigned it the catalogue number 06229.

Kosmos 524 was the fifty-eighth of seventy nine DS-P1-Yu satellites to be launched, and the fifty-second of seventy two to successfully reach orbit. It was operated in an orbit with a perigee of 259 kilometres (161 mi), an apogee of 476 kilometres (296 mi), 70.9 degrees of inclination, and an orbital period of 91.9 minutes. It remained in orbit until it decayed and reentered the atmosphere on 25 March 1973.

== See also ==
- 1972 in spaceflight
