= Kosmos 615 =

Soviet military satellite

- Mission type: ABM radar target
- COSPAR ID: 1973-099A
- SATCAT no.: 06971

Spacecraft properties
- Spacecraft type: DS-P1-I
- Manufacturer: Yuzhnoye
- Launch mass: 400 kilograms (880 lb)

Start of mission
- Launch date: 13 December 1973, 11:10:03 UTC
- Rocket: Kosmos-2I 63SM
- Launch site: Plesetsk 133/1

End of mission
- Decay date: 17 December 1975

Orbital parameters
- Reference system: Geocentric
- Regime: Low Earth
- Perigee altitude: 270 kilometres (170 mi)
- Apogee altitude: 834 kilometres (518 mi)
- Inclination: 71 degrees
- Period: 95.7 minutes

Kosmos 615 (Russian: Космос 615 meaning Cosmos 615), also known as DS-P1-I No. 13, was a satellite which was used as a radar target for anti-ballistic missile tests. It was launched by the Soviet Union in 1973 as part of the Dnepropetrovsk Sputnik programme.

== Launch ==
It was launched aboard a Kosmos-2I 63SM rocket, from Site 133/1 at Plesetsk. The launch occurred at 11:10:03 UTC on 13 December 1973.

== Orbit ==
Kosmos 615 was placed into a low Earth orbit with a perigee of 270 kilometres (170 mi), an apogee of 834 kilometres (518 mi), 71 degrees of inclination, and an orbital period of 95.7 minutes. It decayed from orbit on 17 December 1975.

Kosmos 615 was the thirteenth of nineteen DS-P1-I satellites to be launched. Of these, all reached orbit successfully except the seventh.

== See also ==
- 1973 in spaceflight
- List of Kosmos satellites
