= Kosmos 706 =

Soviet military early warning satellite

- Mission type: Early warning
- COSPAR ID: 1975-007A
- SATCAT no.: 7625
- Mission duration: 4 years

Spacecraft properties
- Spacecraft type: US-K
- Launch mass: 1,900 kilograms (4,200 lb)

Start of mission
- Launch date: 30 January 1975, 15:02 UTC
- Rocket: Molniya-M/2BL
- Launch site: Plesetsk Cosmodrome

End of mission
- Deactivated: 20 November 1975

Orbital parameters
- Reference system: Geocentric
- Regime: Molniya orbit
- Perigee altitude: 659 kilometres (409 mi)
- Apogee altitude: 39,689 kilometres (24,662 mi)
- Inclination: 62.7 degrees
- Period: 717.66 minutes

Kosmos 706 (Russian: Космос 706 meaning Cosmos 706) was a Soviet US-K missile early warning satellite which was launched in 1975 as part of the Soviet military's Oko programme. The satellite was designed to identify missile launches using optical telescopes and infrared sensors.

== Launch ==
Kosmos 706 was launched from Site 41/1 at Plesetsk Cosmodrome in the Russian SSR. A Molniya-M carrier rocket with a 2BL upper stage was used to perform the launch, which took place at 15:02 UTC on 30 January 1975. The launch successfully placed the satellite into a molniya orbit. It subsequently received its Kosmos designation, and the international designator 1975-007A. The United States Space Command assigned it the Satellite Catalog Number 7625.

== See also ==
- 1975 in spaceflight
- List of Kosmos satellites (501–750)
- List of Oko satellites
- List of R-7 launches (1975-1979)
