= Kosmos 526 =

Soviet radar calibration satellite

- Mission type: ABM radar target
- COSPAR ID: 1972-084A
- SATCAT no.: 06254

Spacecraft properties
- Spacecraft type: DS-P1-Yu
- Manufacturer: Yuzhnoye
- Launch mass: 325 kilograms (717 lb)

Start of mission
- Launch date: 25 October 1972, 10:39:57 UTC
- Rocket: Kosmos-2I 63SM
- Launch site: Plesetsk 133/1

End of mission
- Decay date: 8 April 1973

Orbital parameters
- Reference system: Geocentric
- Regime: Low Earth
- Perigee altitude: 264 kilometres (164 mi)
- Apogee altitude: 461 kilometres (286 mi)
- Inclination: 70.9 degrees
- Period: 91.8 minutes

Kosmos 526 (Russian: Космос 526 meaning Cosmos 526), known before launch as DS-P1-Yu No.61, was a Soviet satellite which was launched in 1972 as part of the Dnepropetrovsk Sputnik programme. It was a 325-kilogram (717 lb) spacecraft, which was built by the Yuzhnoye Design Bureau, and was used as a radar calibration target for anti-ballistic missile tests.

Kosmos 526 was successfully launched into low Earth orbit at 10:39:57 UTC on 25 October 1972. The launch took place from Site 133/1 at the Plesetsk Cosmodrome, and used a Kosmos-2I 63SM carrier rocket. Upon reaching orbit, the satellite was assigned its Kosmos designation, and received the International Designator 1972-084A. The North American Aerospace Defense Command assigned it the catalogue number 06254.

Kosmos 526 was the fifty-ninth of seventy nine DS-P1-Yu satellites to be launched, and the fifty-third of seventy two to successfully reach orbit. It was operated in an orbit with a perigee of 264 kilometres (164 mi), an apogee of 461 kilometres (286 mi), 70.9 degrees of inclination, and an orbital period of 91.8 minutes. It remained in orbit until it decayed and reentered the atmosphere on 8 April 1973.

== See also ==
- 1972 in spaceflight
