= Soyuz-M =

Soviet expendable carrier rocket

- Function: Carrier rocket
- Manufacturer: OKB-1
- Country of origin: Soviet Union

Size
- Height: 50 metres (160 ft)
- Diameter: 10.3 metres (34 ft)
- Mass: 300,000 kilograms (660,000 lb)
- Stages: Two

Capacity

Payload to LEO
- Mass: 6,600 kilograms (14,600 lb)

Associated rockets
- Family: R-7 (Soyuz)

Launch history
- Status: Retired
- Launch sites: Plesetsk Sites 41/1 & 43/4
- Total launches: 8
- Success(es): 8
- First flight: 27 December 1971
- Last flight: 31 March 1976
- Carries passengers or cargo: Zenit-4MT

The Soyuz-M (Russian: Союз, meaning "Union"), GRAU index 11A511M was a Soviet expendable carrier rocket designed by OKB-1 and manufactured by State Aviation Plant No. 1 in Samara, Russia. It was originally built to launch crewed Soyuz 7K-VI spacecraft for the Soviet armed forces. Following the cancellation of this programme, development of the rocket continued for the Soyuz 7K-S spacecraft. After this too was cancelled, Soyuz-M development was also abandoned, and the rockets that had been completed were used to launch reconnaissance satellites.

While the exact details of the Soyuz-M are not known, it is believed to be a two-stage rocket, derived from the Soyuz. It may have been similar to the later Soyuz-U. Following the cancellation of the Soyuz 7K-S, eight were launched with Zenit-4MT spacecraft. The first of these launches occurred on 27 December 1971, and the last on 31 March 1976. All launches occurred from the Plesetsk Cosmodrome, six from pad 41/1 and two from pad 43/4.
