= 1974 in spaceflight =

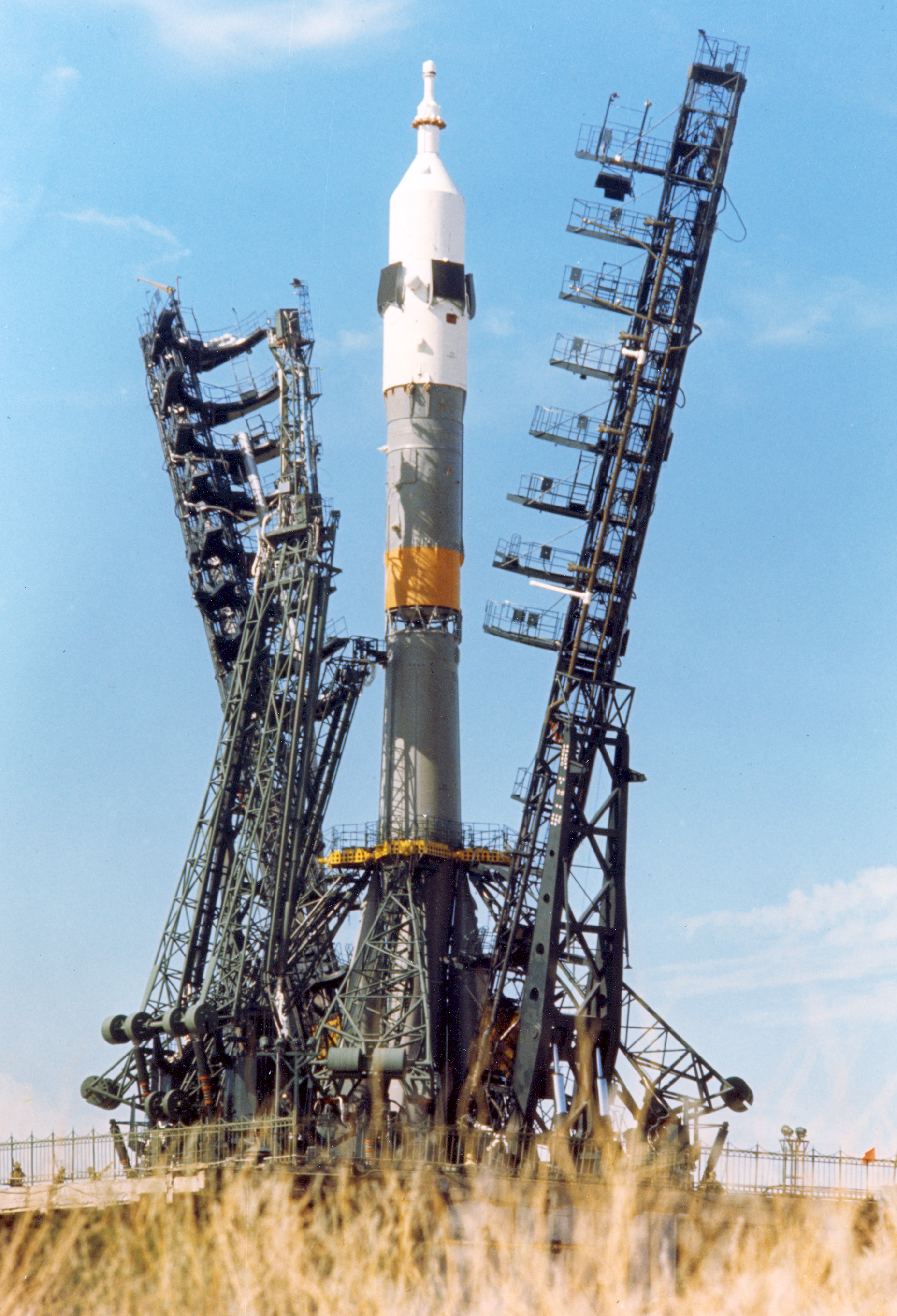
- Soyuz-U launch vehicle

Orbital launches
- First: 5 January
- Last: 2 December

1974 in spaceflight

On 29 March 1974 Mariner 10 became the first spacecraft to fly by Mercury, that saw a spacecraft for the first and last time in the 20th century.

== Orbital launches ==
- ← Jan
- Feb
- Mar
- Apr
- May
- Jun
- Jul
- Aug
- Sep
- Oct
- Nov
- Dec →

Date and time (UTC)	Rocket	Flight number	Launch site		LSP	
Date and time (UTC)	Payload (⚀ = CubeSat)	Operator	Orbit	Function	Decay (UTC)	Outcome
Date and time (UTC)	Remarks					
=== January ===
17 January; 10:07	(Soviet Union) Kosmos 3M		(Soviet Union) Plesetsk (LC-132/2)		VKS	
17 January; 10:07	(Soviet Union) Kosmos 628 (Tsiklon)	MOM	LEO	Navigation	In orbit	Successful
19 January; 01:39	(United States) Delta 2313		(United States) CCAFS (LC-17B)		UK Ministry of Defence	
19 January; 01:39	(United States) Skynet 2A	UK MOD	Intended: GEO Achieved: LEO	Comms	25 January 1974	Failure
19 January; 01:39	Placed in incorrect orbit due to carrier rocket malfunction					
24 January; 15:00	(Soviet Union) Voskhod		(Soviet Union) Plesetsk		MOM	
24 January; 15:00	(Soviet Union) Kosmos 629 (Zenit-2M)	MOM	LEO	Recon	5 February 1974	Success
30 January; 11:00	(Soviet Union) Voskhod		(Soviet Union) Plesetsk		MOM	
30 January; 11:00	(Soviet Union) Kosmos 630 (Zenit-4MK)	MOM	LEO	Aurora research	13 February 1974	Success
=== February ===
6 February; 00:34	(Soviet Union) Kosmos-3M		(Soviet Union) LC-132/2, Plesetsk		VKS	
6 February; 00:34	(Soviet Union) Kosmos 631 (Tselina-O)	VKS	LEO	ELINT	3 October 1980	Successful
11 February; 13:48	(United States) Titan IIIE/Centaur		(United States) LC-41, CCAFS		NASA	
11 February; 13:48	Boilerplate	NASA	Intended: GSO	Test carrier rocket	12 February 1974	Failure
11 February; 13:48	(United States) Sphinx	NASA	Intended: GSO	Plasma research	12 February 1974	Failure
11 February; 13:48	Upper stage turbopump malfunction					
16 February; 05:00	(Japan) M-3C		(Japan) Kagoshima Space Center LP-M		(Japan) ISAS	
16 February; 05:00	(Japan) MS T2 (Tansei 2)	ISAS	Highly elliptical orbit	Technology test	22 January 1983	Successful
16 February; 05:00	First flight of M-3C					
18 February	(United States) Scout D-1		(Italy) San Marco mobile range, Kenya		(Italy) CRS	
18 February	(Italy) (United States) San Marco 4	CRS / NASA	Low Earth	Atmospheric	In orbit	Successful
=== July ===
3 July	(Soviet Union) Soyuz (11A511)		(Soviet Union) LC-1/5, Baikonur			
3 July	(Soviet Union) Soyuz 14		LEO, docked to Salyut 3	Crewed orbital flight	19 July 1974	Successful
12 July; 13:55	(China) Feng Bao 1		(China) Jiquan Satellite Launch Center, LA-2B (Site 138)			
12 July; 13:55	(China) JSSW		Intended: Low Earth	Unknown	12 July	Failure
12 July; 13:55	Carrier rocket lost attitude control.					
16 July	(United States) Scout		(United States) Western Space and Missile Center at Vandenberg AFB		NASA	
16 July	(United States) Aeros 2	NASA				
=== August ===
28 August; 10:08	(Soviet Union) Soyuz (11A511)		(Soviet Union) LC-1/5, Baikonur			
28 August; 10:08	(Soviet Union) Soyuz 15		LEO Plan: Dock to Salyut 3	Crewed orbital flight	28 August 1974	Failure
28 August; 10:08	Failed to dock with Salyut 3					
=== October ===
15 October; 07:47	(United States) Scout B-1		(Italy) San Marco mobile range, Kenya		(Italy) CRS	
15 October; 07:47	(United Kingdom) (United States) Ariel 5	SERC / NASA	Low Earth	X-ray astronomy	14 March 1980	Successful
=== December ===
2 December; 15:00	(Soviet Union) Soyuz-U (11A511U)		(Soviet Union) LC-1/5, Baikonur			
2 December; 15:00	(Soviet Union) Soyuz 16		LEO	Crewed orbital flight	8 December 1974	Successful
2 December; 15:00	First successful crewed use of Soyuz-U launch vehicle					
10 December; 07:11:01	(United States) Titan IIIE/Star-37		(United States) Cape Canaveral SLC-41		(United States) NASA	
10 December; 07:11:01	(United States) (Germany) Helios-A	NASA / DFVLR	Heliocentric	Solar probe	In orbit	Successful
10 December; 07:11:01	Achieved a closest approach to the Sun of 46.5 million km (0.31 AU) in February 1975, the closest approach achieved by an artificial satellite at that point; it was succeeded later by Helios-B.					

- ← Jan
- Feb
- Mar
- Apr
- May
- Jun
- Jul
- Aug
- Sep
- Oct
- Nov
- Dec →

== Suborbital launches ==
- ← Jan
- Feb
- Mar
- Apr
- May
- Jun
- Jul
- Aug
- Sep
- Oct
- Nov
- Dec →

Date and time (UTC)	Rocket	Flight number	Launch site		LSP	
Date and time (UTC)	Payload	Operator	Orbit	Function	Decay (UTC)	Outcome
Date and time (UTC)	Remarks					
=== January-March ===
12 January; 19:12	(United Kingdom) Skylark		El Arenosillo		NASA	
12 January; 19:12	(Germany) H-GR-58	DFVLR	Sub-orbital	Astronomy	12 Jan 1974	Successful
5 January; 01:45	(United States) Aerobee 200A		(United States) White Sands		NASA	
5 January; 01:45		NASA	Sub-orbital	Aeronomy/Ultraviolet astronomy	5 January 1974	Successful
8 January; 01:40	(United States) Aerobee 200A		(United States) White Sands		NASA	
8 January; 01:40		NASA/NRL	Sub-orbital	Aeronomy/Ultraviolet astronomy	8 January 1974	Successful
11 January; 22:00	(Soviet Union) R-36		(Soviet Union) Baikonur (LC-162/36)		RVSN	
11 January; 22:00	(Soviet Union) Dkh	RVSN	Sub-orbital	ICBM test	12 January 1974	Successful
15 January; 20:00	(United States) Black Brant VC		(United States) White Sands (LC-36)		NASA	
15 January; 20:00		NASA	Sub-orbital	Solar research	15 January 1974	Successful
16 January; 02:00	(Japan) Kappa 9M		(Japan) Kagoshima (LC-36)		ISAS	
16 January; 02:00		ISAS	Sub-orbital	Ionosphere & Solar research	16 January 1974	Successful
16 January; 17:40	(United States) Nike Apache		(United States) Wallops Island		NASA	
16 January; 17:40		NASA	Sub-orbital	Aeronomy	16 January 1974	Successful
16 January; 18:13	(United States) Super Arcas		(United States) Wallops Island		NASA	
16 January; 18:13		NASA	Sub-orbital	Ionosphere research	16 January 1974	Successful
16 January; 01:40	(United States) Aerobee 200A		(United States) White Sands		NASA	
16 January; 01:40		NASA	Sub-orbital	Solar research	16 January 1974	Successful
17 January; 02:37	(United States) Nike Tomahawk		(United States) Poker Flat		NASA	
17 January; 02:37		NASA/NRL	Sub-orbital	Plasma research	17 January 1974	Successful
19 January; 11:34	(United Kingdom) Skua		(Spain) El Arenosillo		RAE	
19 January; 11:34		RAE	Sub-orbital	Ionosphere research	19 January 1974	Success
19 January	(Soviet Union) R-36M		(Soviet Union) LC-103, Baikonur		RVSN	
19 January	POR	RVSN	Sub-orbital	ICBM Test	20 January 1974	Success
21 January; 02:39	(United States) Nike Tomahawk		(United States) Poker Flat		NASA	
21 January; 02:39		NASA	Sub-orbital	Plasma research	21 January 1974	Success
21 January; 11:30	(United Kingdom) Skua 4		(Spain) El Arenosillo		RAE	
21 January; 11:30		RAE	Sub-orbital	Ionosphere research	21 January 1974	Success
22 January; 02:41	(United States) Nike Tomahawk		(United States) Poker Flat		NASA	
22 January; 02:41		NASA	Sub-orbital	Plasma research	22 January 1974	Success
22 January; 11:00	(Japan) Lambda 3H		(Japan) Area 3L, Kagoshima		ISAS	
22 January; 11:00		ISAS	Sub-orbital	X-ray astronomy	22 January 1974	Success
22 January; 01:40	(United States) Aerobee 200A		(United States) White Sands		NASA	
22 January; 01:40		NASA/NRL	Sub-orbital	Solar research	22 January 1974	Successful
22 January; 01:40	(United States) Minuteman I		(United States) LF-06, Vandenberg AFB		USAF	
22 January; 01:40		USAF	Sub-orbital	ICBM test	22 January 1974	Successful
23 January; 11:30	(United Kingdom) Skua		(Spain) El Arenosillo		RAE	
23 January; 11:30		RAE	Sub-orbital	Ionosphere research	23 January 1974	Success
23 January; 12:50	(Canada) Black Brant VB		(Canada) Churchill		NRC	
23 January; 12:50		NRC	Sub-orbital	Aeronomy/Ionosphere/Aurora research	23 January 1974	Success
25 January; 11:30	(United Kingdom) Skua		(Spain) El Arenosillo		RAE	
25 January; 11:30		RAE	Sub-orbital	Ionosphere research	25 January 1974	Success
25 January	(Soviet Union) UR-100N		(Soviet Union) Baikonur Cosmodrome		RVSN	
25 January		RVSN	Sub-orbital	ICBM test	25 January 1974	Success
26 January	(United States) Minuteman III		(United States) LF-25, Vandenberg AFB		USAF	
26 January	GT-24GB-1	USAF	Sub-orbital	ICBM test	26 January 1974	Success
26 January	(Soviet Union) UR-100N		(Soviet Union) Baikonur Cosmodrome		RVSN	
26 January	GT-24GB-1	RVSN	Sub-orbital	ICBM test	26 January 1974	Success
27 January; 19:08	(United States) Nike Tomahawk		(Norway) Andøya		NASA	
27 January; 19:08	Ferdinand 35 (Polar 3)	NDRE	Sub-orbital	Aurora research	27 January 1974	Success
30 January	(France) SSBS S2		(France) BLB, Biscarosse		DMA	
30 January		DMA	Sub-orbital	Missile test	30 January 1974	Success
1 February; 06:30	(Japan) JCR		(Japan) Area T, Tanegashima		NASDA	
1 February; 06:30		NASDA	Sub-orbital	Test flight	1 February 1974	Successful
4 February; 14:40	(United Kingdom) Skylark 6AC		(Australia) LA-2SL, Woomera		BAC	
4 February; 14:40		BAC	Sub-orbital	Astronomy	4 February 1974	Successful
4 February	(Soviet Union) MR-UR-100		(Soviet Union) LC-177, Baikonur		RVSN	
4 February		RVSN	Sub-orbital	ICBM test	4 February 1974	Successful
6 February; 22:48	(Canada) Black Brant IVB		(Norway) Andoya		DLR	
6 February; 22:48		DLR	Sub-orbital	Aurora research (DLR A-BB4-63 Auroral mission)	6 February 1974	Successful
6 February	(United States) Polaris A3		(United States) Submarine, WTR		US Navy	
6 February		US Navy	Sub-orbital	SLBM test	6 February 1974	Successful
6 February	(United States) Polaris A3		(United States) Submarine, WTR		US Navy	
6 February		US Navy	Sub-orbital	SLBM test	6 February 1974	Successful
9 February; 02:10	(United States) Aerobee 200A		(United States) White Sands		NASA	
9 February; 02:10		NASA	Sub-orbital	Astronomy	9 February 1974	Successful
9 February; 06:30	(Japan) LS-C		(Japan) Area T, Tanegashima		NASDA	
9 February; 06:30		NASDA	Sub-orbital	Test flight	9 February 1974	Successful
=== July-September ===
11 July; 05:01	(Soviet Union) K63D		(Soviet Union) Vladimirovka test range, near Kapustin Yar			
11 July; 05:01	(Soviet Union) BOR-3 No.302		Suborbital	Re-entry test for Spiral program	11 July	Partial success
11 July; 05:01	Subscale model of the Spiral spaceplane. After nominal flight, parachute system failed and the craft crashed. Apogee: 100 km					
=== October-December ===

- ← Jan
- Feb
- Mar
- Apr
- May
- Jun
- Jul
- Aug
- Sep
- Oct
- Nov
- Dec →

== Deep Space Rendezvous ==
Date (GMT)	Spacecraft	Event	Remarks
5 February	Mariner 10	Flyby of Venus	Gravity assist; Closest approach: 5,768 kilometres (3,584 mi)
10 February	Mars 4	Flyby of Mars	Closest approach: 2,200 kilometres (1,400 mi) (orbiter mission)
12 February	Mars 5	Areocentric orbit injection	
9 March	Mars 7	Lander missed mars by 1,300 kilometres (810 mi)	
12 March	Mars 6	Lander lost a few seconds before anticipated landing	
29 March	Mariner 10	1st flyby of Mercury	Closest approach: 703 kilometres (437 mi)
2 June	Luna 22	Selenocentric orbit injection	Photographic mission
21 September	Mariner 10	2nd flyby of Mercury	Closest approach: 48,069 kilometres (29,869 mi)
2 November	Luna 23	Landed rough at Mare Crisium, the Moon	Sample return mission
3 December	Pioneer 11	Flyby of Jupiter	Gravity assist; Closest approach: 42,960 kilometres (26,690 mi)

== EVAs ==
Start date/time	Duration	End time	Spacecraft	Crew	Remarks
3 February; 15:19	5 hours 19 minutes	20:38	Skylab; SLM-3	(United States) Gerald P. Carr (United States) Edward Gibson	Retrieved the final film from the solar observatory and photographed Kohoutek using an electronographic camera.
