= DS-P1-Yu =

Series of Soviet satellites

- Mission type: Radar calibration satellite
- Operator: Soviet Union

Spacecraft properties
- Launch mass: 193–240 kg

Orbital parameters
- Period: 60 days

DS-P1-Yu was a series of Soviet satellites developed by the Yuzhnoye Design Office, for use in calibrating the Dnestr space surveillance and early-warning radar system. Between 1964 and 1976, a total of 79 satellites were launched on Kosmos and Kosmos-2I launchers, with seven failing to reach orbit.

The dodecahedral satellites had a mass of 193–240 kilograms (425–529 lb) and an operational lifetime of 60 days. They were covered in solar panels and a metallic mesh transparent to visible spectrum light and opaque to radio frequencies.

The DS-P1-Yu replaced the similar DS-P1, of which four were launched between 1962 and 1964, with one failure to reach orbit.
