= Kosmos 459 =

Soviet anti-satellite weapon test target satellite

- Mission type: ASAT target
- COSPAR ID: 1971-102A
- SATCAT no.: 05625

Spacecraft properties
- Spacecraft type: DS-P1-M
- Manufacturer: Yuzhnoye
- Launch mass: 650 kilograms (1,430 lb)

Start of mission
- Launch date: 29 November 1971, 17:30:00 UTC
- Rocket: Kosmos-3M
- Launch site: Plesetsk 132/1

Orbital parameters
- Reference system: Geocentric
- Regime: Low Earth
- Perigee altitude: 199 kilometres (124 mi)
- Apogee altitude: 286 kilometres (178 mi)
- Inclination: 65 degrees
- Period: 89.4 minutes

Kosmos 459 (Russian: Космос 459 meaning Cosmos 459), also known as DS-P1-M No.5 was a satellite which was used as a target for tests of anti-satellite weapons. It was launched by the Soviet Union in 1971 as part of the Dnepropetrovsk Sputnik programme, and used as a target for Kosmos 462, as part of the Istrebitel Sputnikov programme.

== Launch ==
It was launched aboard a Kosmos-3M carrier rocket, from Site 132/1 at the Plesetsk Cosmodrome. The launch occurred at 17:30:00 UTC on 29 November 1971.

== Orbit ==
Kosmos 459 was placed into a low Earth orbit with a perigee of 199 kilometres (124 mi), an apogee of 286 kilometres (178 mi), 65 degrees of inclination, and an orbital period of 89.4 minutes. It was successfully intercepted and destroyed by Kosmos 462. Two major pieces of debris were associated with the satellite, which decayed from orbit on 1 and 7 December 1971.

Kosmos 459 was the fourth of the five original DS-P1-M satellites to be launched, of which all but the first successfully reached orbit. After the five initial launches the DS-P1-M satellite was replaced with a derivative, Lira. The interception of Kosmos 459 was the last completed test of the IS-A interceptor as part of Soviet state trials, and the last attempt to intercept a baseline DS-P1-M satellite as no attempt was made to intercept Kosmos 521. Following the test, the IS-A anti-satellite system was declared operational.

== See also ==
- 1971 in spaceflight
