= Kosmos 394 =

Soviet anti-satllite test target satellite

- Mission type: Technology
- COSPAR ID: 1971-010A
- SATCAT no.: 04922

Spacecraft properties
- Spacecraft type: DS-P1-M
- Manufacturer: Yuzhnoye
- Launch mass: 650 kilograms (1,430 lb)

Start of mission
- Launch date: 9 February 1971, 18:48:48 UTC
- Rocket: Kosmos-3M
- Launch site: Plesetsk 132/1

Orbital parameters
- Reference system: Geocentric
- Regime: Low Earth
- Perigee altitude: 522 kilometres (324 mi)
- Apogee altitude: 552 kilometres (343 mi)
- Inclination: 65.8 degrees
- Period: 95.4 minutes

Kosmos 394 (Russian: Космос 394 meaning Cosmos 394), also known as DS-P1-M No.2 is a satellite which was used to demonstrate technology for future satellites which would be used as targets for tests of anti-satellite weapons. It was launched by the Soviet Union in 1971 as part of the Dnepropetrovsk Sputnik programme. Following the completion of testing it was intercepted and destroyed by Kosmos 397 on 25 February.

== Launch ==
It was launched aboard a Kosmos-3M carrier rocket, from Site 132/1 at the Plesetsk Cosmodrome. The launch occurred at 18:48:48 UTC on 9 February 1971.

== Orbit ==
Kosmos 394 was placed into a low Earth orbit with a perigee of 522 kilometres (324 mi), an apogee of 552 kilometres (343 mi), 65.8 degrees of inclination, and an orbital period of 95.4 minutes. As of 2009, debris from its destruction is still in orbit.

Kosmos 394 was the second of the five original DS-P1-M satellites to be launched, and the first to successfully reach orbit. The three subsequent launches were all successful, before the satellite was replaced with a derivative, Lira. DS-P1-M and Lira satellites were used as targets for the Istrebitel Sputnikov programme.

== See also ==
- 1971 in spaceflight
