= Kosmos 400 =

Soviet anti-satellite weapons test target

- Mission type: ASAT target
- COSPAR ID: 1971-020A
- SATCAT no.: 05050

Spacecraft properties
- Spacecraft type: DS-P1-M
- Manufacturer: Yuzhnoye
- Launch mass: 650 kilograms (1,430 lb)

Start of mission
- Launch date: 18 March 1971, 21:45:00 UTC
- Rocket: Kosmos-3M
- Launch site: Plesetsk 132/1

Orbital parameters
- Reference system: Geocentric
- Regime: Low Earth
- Perigee altitude: 990 kilometres (620 mi)
- Apogee altitude: 995 kilometres (618 mi)
- Inclination: 65.8 degrees
- Period: 105 minutes

Kosmos 400 (Russian: Космос 400 meaning Cosmos 400), also known as DS-P1-M No.3 was a satellite which was used as a target for tests of anti-satellite weapons. It was launched by the Soviet Union in 1971 as part of the Dnepropetrovsk Sputnik programme, and used as a target for Kosmos 404, as part of the Istrebitel Sputnikov programme.

== Launch ==
It was launched aboard a Kosmos-3M carrier rocket, from Site 132/1 at the Plesetsk Cosmodrome. The launch occurred at 21:45:00 UTC on 18 March 1971.

== Orbit ==
Kosmos 400 was placed into a low Earth orbit with a perigee of 990 kilometres (620 mi), an apogee of 995 kilometres (618 mi), 65.8 degrees of inclination, and an orbital period of 105 minutes. It was successfully intercepted and destroyed by Kosmos 404 on 4 April. As of 2009, debris is still in orbit.

Kosmos 400 was the third of the five original DS-P1-M satellites to be launched, of which all but the first were successful. Following the five initial launches the DS-P1-M satellite was replaced with a derivative, Lira.

== See also ==
- 1971 in spaceflight
