= 1971 in spaceflight =

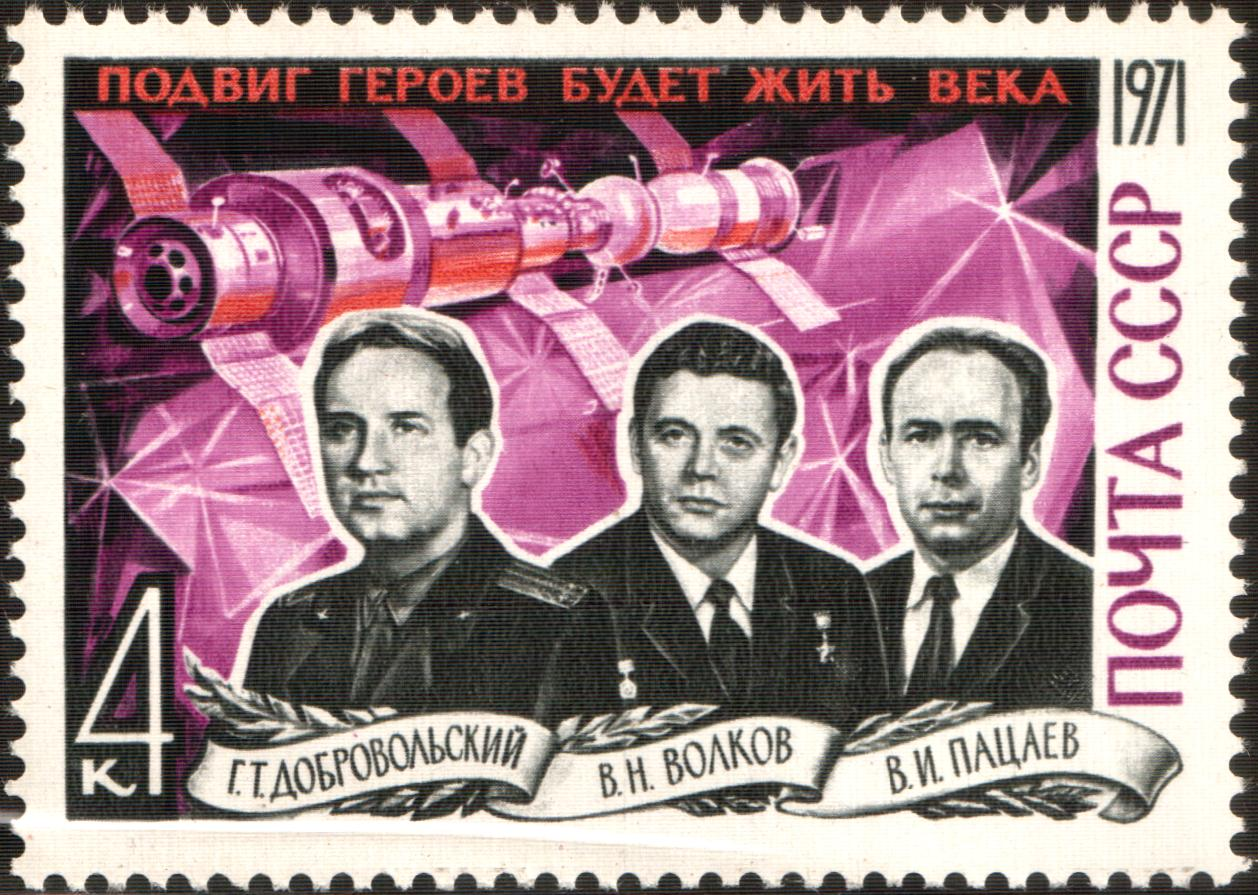
- Salyut 1, the first space station and Soyuz 11, the first mission to successfully dock with it, were launched in 1971. The crew were killed during reentry when their spacecraft depressurised

Orbital launches
- First: 12 January
- Last: 29 December
- Total: 133
- Successes: 118
- Failures: 15
- Catalogued: 120

National firsts
- Orbital launch: United Kingdom

Rockets
- Maiden flights: Soyuz-M; Delta M6; Thor LV-2F Burner IIA; Titan III(24)B; Titan III(33)B; Titan IIID
- Retirements: Black Arrow; Delta E1; Delta M Delta M6; Delta N6; Europa; Long March 1 R-36OM; Soyuz-L; Thor LV-2F Burner II; Thorad SLV-2G Agena-D; Titan III(23)B

Crewed flights
- Orbital: 4
- Total travellers: 12

1971 in spaceflight

1971 saw the last three known deaths of cosmonauts of the Soviet space program and the only deaths in space. Their mission was to man humanity's first space station. The experimental bay door failed to separate so the first crew failed to dock and second crew were killed on re-entry. 1971 also saw the launch of the first and only British satellite on top of a British rocket after that success the program was cancelled.

== Orbital launches ==
- ← Jan
- Feb
- Mar
- Apr
- May
- Jun
- Jul
- Aug
- Sep
- Oct
- Nov
- Dec →

Date and time (UTC)	Rocket	Flight number	Launch site		LSP	
Date and time (UTC)	Payload	Operator	Orbit	Function	Decay (UTC)	Outcome
Date and time (UTC)	Remarks					
=== January ===
12 January; 09:30	(Soviet Union) Voskhod		(Soviet Union) Baikonur 31/6		(Soviet Union)	
12 January; 09:30	(Soviet Union) Kosmos 390 (Zenit-4M)		Low Earth	Optical imaging	25 January	Successful
14 January; 12:00:00	(Soviet Union) Kosmos-2I		(Soviet Union) Plesetsk 133/1		(Soviet Union)	
14 January; 12:00:00	(Soviet Union) Kosmos 391 (DS-P1-I No.10)		Low Earth	Radar target	21 February 1972	Successful
20 January; 11:24:00	(Soviet Union) Vostok-2M		(Soviet Union) Plesetsk 41/1		(Soviet Union)	
20 January; 11:24:00	(Soviet Union) Meteor 1-07 (Meteor-M)		Sun-synchronous	Weather	14 July 2005	Successful
21 January; 08:40	(Soviet Union) Voskhod		(Soviet Union) Baikonur 31/6		(Soviet Union)	
21 January; 08:40	(Soviet Union) Kosmos 392 (Zenit-2M)		Low Earth	Optical imaging	2 February	Successful
21 January; 18:20	(United States) Titan III(23)B		(United States) Vandenberg SLC-4W		(United States) US Air Force	
21 January; 18:20	(United States) OPS 7776 (Gambit-3 4330)	NRO	Low Earth	Optical imaging	9 February	Successful
21 January; 18:20	(United States) OPS 7776 SRV-1	NRO	Low Earth	Film return	January	Successful
21 January; 18:20	(United States) OPS 7776 SRV-2	NRO	Low Earth	Film return	February	Successful
26 January; 00:36:03	(United States) Atlas SLV-3C Centaur-D		(United States) Cape Kennedy LC-36A		(United States)	
26 January; 00:36:03	(United Nations) Intelsat IV F-2	Intelsat	Geosynchronous	Communications	In orbit	Successful
26 January; 12:44:33	(Soviet Union) Kosmos-2I		(Soviet Union) Plesetsk 133/1		(Soviet Union)	
26 January; 12:44:33	(Soviet Union) Kosmos 393 (DS-P1-Yu No.34)		Low Earth	Calibration	16 June	Successful
31 January; 21:03	(United States) Saturn V		(United States) Kennedy LC-39A		(United States) NASA	
31 January; 21:03	(United States) Apollo 14 CSM	NASA	Selenocentric	Lunar orbiter	9 February; 21:05	Successful
31 January; 21:03	(United States) Apollo 14 LM	NASA	Selenocentric	Lunar lander	5 February; 09:17	Successful
31 January; 21:03	Crewed flight with three astronauts, third crewed Lunar landing					
=== February ===
3 February; 01:41:40	(United States) Delta M		(United States) Cape Kennedy LC-17A		(United States)	
3 February; 01:41:40	NATO-2B	NATO	Geosynchronous	Communications	In orbit	Successful
3 February; 01:41:40	Final flight of Delta M					
9 February; 18:48:48	(Soviet Union) Kosmos-3M		(Soviet Union) Plesetsk 132/1		(Soviet Union)	
9 February; 18:48:48	(Soviet Union) Kosmos 394 (DS-P1-M No.2)		Low Earth	ASAT target	25 February (destroyed)	Successful
9 February; 18:48:48	Destroyed by Kosmos 397, debris still in orbit					
16 February; 04:00:00	(Japan) Mu-3S		(Japan) Kagoshima LA-M		(Japan) ISAS	
16 February; 04:00:00	(Japan) Tansei 1	ISAS	Low Earth	Technology	In orbit	Successful
17 February; 03:52:05	(United States) Thor LV-2F Burner II		(United States) Vandenberg SLC-10W		(United States) US Air Force	
17 February; 03:52:05	(United States) OPS 5268 (DAPP-5A F-3)	US Air Force	Low Earth	Weather	In orbit	Successful
17 February; 03:52:05	(United States) Calsphere 3 (NRL PL-170A)	NRL	Low Earth	Calibration	17 October 1989	Successful
17 February; 03:52:05	(United States) Calsphere 4 (NRL PL-170B)	NRL	Low Earth	Calibration	20 September 1989	Successful
17 February; 03:52:05	(United States) Calsphere 5 (NRL PL-170C)	NRL	Low Earth	Calibration	7 January 1990	Successful
17 February; 20:04:30	(United States) Thorad SLV-2H Agena-D		(United States) Vandenberg SLC-3W		(United States) US Air Force	
17 February; 20:04:30	(United States) KH-4B No.1113	NRO	Intended: Low Earth	Optical imaging	+18 seconds	Launch failure
17 February; 20:04:30	Engine failure due to chain of malfunctions caused by fuel additive loading error					
17 February; 21:09	(Soviet Union) Kosmos-3M		(Soviet Union) Plesetsk 132/1		(Soviet Union)	
17 February; 21:09	(Soviet Union) Kosmos 395 (Tselina-OM)		Low Earth	ELINT	6 April 1980	Successful
18 February; 13:59	(Soviet Union) Voskhod		(Soviet Union) Plesetsk 43/3		(Soviet Union)	
18 February; 13:59	(Soviet Union) Kosmos 396 (Zenit-4M)		Low Earth	Optical imaging	3 March	Successful
25 February; 11:11	(Soviet Union) Tsyklon-2		(Soviet Union) Baikonur 90/19		(Soviet Union)	
25 February; 11:11	(Soviet Union) Kosmos 397 (IS-A)		Initial: Low Earth; Final: Medium Earth	ASAT test	In orbit	Successful
25 February; 11:11	Intercepted and destroyed Kosmos 394					
26 February; 05:06	(Soviet Union) Soyuz-L		(Soviet Union) Baikonur 31/6		(Soviet Union)	
26 February; 05:06	(Soviet Union) Kosmos 398 (LK T2K No.2)		Deployed: Low Earth; Final: Medium Earth	Test flight	10 December 1995	Successful
=== March ===
3 March; 09:30	(Soviet Union) Voskhod		(Soviet Union) Baikonur 31/6		(Soviet Union)	
3 March; 09:30	(Soviet Union) Kosmos 399 (Zenit-4M)		Low Earth	Optical imaging	17 March	Successful
3 March; 12:15	(China) Long March 1		(China) Jiuquan LA-2A		(China)	
3 March; 12:15	(China) Shijian 1		Low Earth	Technology	17 June 1979	Successful
5 March; 08:15:02	(Soviet Union) Kosmos-2I		(Soviet Union) Kapustin Yar 86/4		(Soviet Union)	
5 March; 08:15:02	(Soviet Union) DS-P1-Yu No.39		Intended: Low Earth	Calibration	+133 seconds	Launch failure
5 March; 08:15:02	Second stage malfunction, failed to orbit					
5 March	(Soviet Union) Voskhod		(Soviet Union) Plesetsk 43/4		(Soviet Union)	
5 March	(Soviet Union) Zenit-2M		Intended: Low Earth	Optical imaging	5 March	Launch failure
5 March	(Soviet Union) Nauka 2KS No.3		Intended: Low Earth		5 March	Launch failure
13 March; 16:15:00	(United States) Delta M6		(United States) Cape Kennedy LC-17A		(United States)	
13 March; 16:15:00	(United States) Explorer 43 (IMP-6)	NASA	Highly elliptical	Gamma-ray astronomy	2 October 1974	Successful
13 March; 16:15:00	Only flight of Delta M6					
18 March; 21:45:00	(Soviet Union) Kosmos-3M		(Soviet Union) Plesetsk 132/1		(Soviet Union)	
18 March; 21:45:00	(Soviet Union) Kosmos 400 (DS-P1-M No.3)		Low Earth	ASAT target	4 April (destroyed)	Successful
18 March; 21:45:00	Destroyed by Kosmos 402, debris still in orbit					
21 March; 03:45	(United States) Titan III(33)B		(United States) Vandenberg SLC-4W		(United States) US Air Force	
21 March; 03:45	(United States) OPS 4788 (Jumpseat)	NRO	Molniya	ELINT	In orbit	Successful
21 March; 03:45	Maiden flight of Titan III(33)B, first Jumpseat satellite					
24 March; 21:05	(United States) Thorad SLV-2H Agena-D		(United States) Vandenberg SLC-3W		(United States) US Air Force	
24 March; 21:05	(United States) OPS 5300 (KH-4B No.1115)	NRO	Low Earth	Optical imaging	12 April	
27 March; 10:59	(Soviet Union) Voskhod		(Soviet Union) Plesetsk 43/3		(Soviet Union)	
27 March; 10:59	(Soviet Union) Kosmos 401 (Zenit-4M)		Low Earth	Optical imaging	9 April	Successful
=== April ===
1 April; 02:57:07	(United States) Delta E1		(United States) Vandenberg SLC-2E		(United States)	
1 April; 02:57:07	(Canada) (United States) ISIS 2	CSA/NASA	Low Earth	Ionospheric	In orbit	Successful
1 April; 02:57:07	Final flight of Delta E1					
1 April; 11:29	(Soviet Union) Tsyklon-2		(Soviet Union) Baikonur 90/20		(Soviet Union)	
1 April; 11:29	(Soviet Union) Kosmos 402 (US-A)		Low Earth	Ocean surveillance	6 May	Successful
2 April; 08:20	(Soviet Union) Voskhod		(Soviet Union) Plesetsk 43/3		(Soviet Union)	
2 April; 08:20	(Soviet Union) Kosmos 403 (Zenit-2M)		Low Earth	Optical imaging	14 April	Successful
4 April; 14:27	(Soviet Union) Tsyklon-2		(Soviet Union) Baikonur 90/19		(Soviet Union)	
4 April; 14:27	(Soviet Union) Kosmos 404 (IS-A)		Low Earth	ASAT test	4 April	Successful
4 April; 14:27	Intercepted and destroyed Kosmos 400					
7 April; 07:10	(Soviet Union) Vostok-2M		(Soviet Union) Plesetsk 43/4		(Soviet Union)	
7 April; 07:10	(Soviet Union) Kosmos 405 (Tselina-D)		Low Earth	ELINT	3 November 2023; 03:27	Successful
14 April; 08:00	(Soviet Union) Voskhod		(Soviet Union) Plesetsk 43/4		(Soviet Union)	
14 April; 08:00	(Soviet Union) Kosmos 406 (Zenit-4M)		Low Earth	Optical imaging	24 April	Successful
15 April; 09:19	(France) Diamant B		(France) Kourou ALD		(France) CNES	
15 April; 09:19	(France) Tournesol	CNES	Low Earth	Ionospheric	28 January 1980	Successful
17 April; 11:44:58	(Soviet Union) Vostok-2M		(Soviet Union) Plesetsk 43/4		(Soviet Union)	
17 April; 11:44:58	(Soviet Union) Meteor 1-08 (Meteor-M)		Sun-synchronous	Weather	10 January 1991	Successful
19 April; 01:40:00	(Soviet Union) Proton-K		(Soviet Union) Baikonur 81/24		(Soviet Union)	
19 April; 01:40:00	(Soviet Union) Salyut 1		Low Earth	Space station	11 October	Successful
19 April; 01:40:00	First space station, visited by two crews. First crew failed to dock, second killed after departure					
22 April; 15:30	(United States) Titan III(23)B		(United States) Vandenberg SLC-4W		(United States) US Air Force	
22 April; 15:30	(United States) OPS 7899 (Gambit-3 4331)	NRO	Low Earth	Optical imaging	13 May	Successful
22 April; 15:30	(United States) OPS 7899 SRV-1	NRO	Low Earth	Film return	April/May	Successful
22 April; 15:30	(United States) OPS 7899 SRV-2	NRO	Low Earth	Film return	May	Successful
22 April; 15:30	Final flight of Titan III(23)B					
22 April; 23:54:06	(Soviet Union) Soyuz		(Soviet Union) Baikonur 1/5		(Soviet Union)	
22 April; 23:54:06	(Soviet Union) Soyuz 10		Low Earth (Salyut 1)	Crewed	24 April; 23:40:00	Spacecraft failure
22 April; 23:54:06	Crewed flight with three cosmonauts. First mission to dock with a space station, aborted after spacecraft failed to achieve hard dock with Salyut 1					
23 April; 11:30	(Soviet Union) Kosmos-3M		(Soviet Union) Plesetsk 132/1		(Soviet Union)	
23 April; 11:30	(Soviet Union) Kosmos 407 (Strela-2M)		Low Earth	Communications	In orbit	Successful
24 April; 07:32:29	(United States) Scout B		(Italy) San Marco mobile range, Kenya		(Italy) CRS	
24 April; 07:32:29	(Italy) (United States) San Marco 3	CRS / NASA	Low Earth	Atmospheric	29 November	Successful
24 April; 11:15:02	(Soviet Union) Kosmos-2I		(Soviet Union) Plesetsk 133/1		(Soviet Union)	
24 April; 11:15:02	(Soviet Union) Kosmos 408 (DS-P1-Yu No.37)		Low Earth	Calibration	29 December	Successful
28 April; 14:35	(Soviet Union) Kosmos-3M		(Soviet Union) Plesetsk 132/1		(Soviet Union)	
28 April; 14:35	(Soviet Union) Kosmos 409 (Sfera)		Low Earth	Geodesy	In orbit	Successful
=== May ===
5 May; 07:43:01	(United States) Titan III(23)C		(United States) Cape Kennedy LC-40		(United States) US Air Force	
5 May; 07:43:01	(United States) OPS 3811 (DSP SVN-3/IMEWS-2)	US Air Force	Geosynchronous	Missile defence	In orbit	Successful
6 May; 06:20	(Soviet Union) Voskhod		(Soviet Union) Baikonur 31/6		(Soviet Union)	
6 May; 06:20	(Soviet Union) Kosmos 410 (Zenit-2M)		Low Earth	Optical imaging	18 May	Successful
6 May; 06:20	(Soviet Union) Nauka 8KS No.1		Low Earth		25 May	Successful
7 May; 14:20	(Soviet Union) Kosmos-3M		(Soviet Union) Plesetsk 132/1		(Soviet Union)	
7 May; 14:20	(Soviet Union) Kosmos 411 (Strela-1M)		Low Earth	Communications	In orbit	Successful
7 May; 14:20	(Soviet Union) Kosmos 412 (Strela-1M)		Low Earth	Communications	In orbit	Successful
7 May; 14:20	(Soviet Union) Kosmos 413 (Strela-1M)		Low Earth	Communications	In orbit	Successful
7 May; 14:20	(Soviet Union) Kosmos 414 (Strela-1M)		Low Earth	Communications	In orbit	Successful
7 May; 14:20	(Soviet Union) Kosmos 415 (Strela-1M)		Low Earth	Communications	In orbit	Successful
7 May; 14:20	(Soviet Union) Kosmos 416 (Strela-1M)		Low Earth	Communications	In orbit	Successful
7 May; 14:20	(Soviet Union) Kosmos 417 (Strela-1M)		Low Earth	Communications	In orbit	Successful
7 May; 14:20	(Soviet Union) Kosmos 418 (Strela-1M)		Low Earth	Communications	In orbit	Successful
9 May; 01:11:02	(United States) Atlas SLV-3C Centaur-D		(United States) Cape Kennedy LC-36A		(United States)	
9 May; 01:11:02	(United States) Mariner 8	NASA	Intended: Areocentric	Mars orbiter	9 May	Launch failure
9 May; 01:11:02	Upper stage thrust vectoring failed due to gyroscope malfunction, failed to orbit					
10 May; 16:58:42	(Soviet Union) Proton-K/D		(Soviet Union) Baikonur 81/23		(Soviet Union)	
10 May; 16:58:42	(Soviet Union) Kosmos 419 (Mars 3MS No.170)		Intended: Areocentric; Achieved: Low Earth	Mars orbiter	12 May	Launch failure
10 May; 16:58:42	Blok D failed to ignite due to programming error; coast phase incorrectly entered in years instead of hours					
18 May; 08:00	(Soviet Union) Voskhod		(Soviet Union) Baikonur 31/6		(Soviet Union)	
18 May; 08:00	(Soviet Union) Kosmos 420 (Zenit-4M)		Low Earth	Optical imaging	29 May	Successful
19 May; 10:20:00	(Soviet Union) Kosmos-2I		(Soviet Union) Plesetsk 133/1		(Soviet Union)	
19 May; 10:20:00	(Soviet Union) Kosmos 421 (DS-P1-Yu No.48)		Low Earth	Calibration	8 November	Successful
19 May; 16:22:44	(Soviet Union) Proton-K/D		(Soviet Union) Baikonur 81/24		(Soviet Union)	
19 May; 16:22:44	(Soviet Union) Mars 2 orbiter		Areocentric	Mars orbiter	In orbit	Successful
19 May; 16:22:44	(Soviet Union) Mars 2 lander		Heliocentric	Mars lander	27 November	Spacecraft failure
19 May; 16:22:44	Lander failed to achieve soft landing, instead impacting the planet					
22 May; 00:51	(Soviet Union) Kosmos-3M		(Soviet Union) Plesetsk 132/1		(Soviet Union)	
22 May; 00:51	(Soviet Union) Kosmos 422 (Tsyklon)		Low Earth	Navigation	In orbit	Successful
27 May; 11:59:55	(Soviet Union) Kosmos-2I		(Soviet Union) Plesetsk 133/1		(Soviet Union)	
27 May; 11:59:55	(Soviet Union) Kosmos 423 (DS-P1-Yu No.47)		Low Earth	Calibration	26 November	Successful
28 May; 10:30	(Soviet Union) Voskhod		(Soviet Union) Plesetsk 43/4		(Soviet Union)	
28 May; 10:30	(Soviet Union) Kosmos 424 (Zenit-4M)		Low Earth	Optical imaging	10 June	Successful
28 May; 15:26:30	(Soviet Union) Proton-K/D		(Soviet Union) Baikonur 81/23		(Soviet Union)	
28 May; 15:26:30	(Soviet Union) Mars 3 orbiter		Areocentric	Mars orbiter	In orbit	Successful
28 May; 15:26:30	(Soviet Union) Mars 3 lander		Heliocentric	Mars lander	2 December	Spacecraft failure
28 May; 15:26:30	Lander failed 20 seconds after landing					
29 May; 03:49	(Soviet Union) Kosmos-3M		(Soviet Union) Plesetsk 132/1		(Soviet Union)	
29 May; 03:49	(Soviet Union) Kosmos 425 (Tselina-OM)		Low Earth	ELINT	15 January 1980	Successful
30 May; 22:23:04	(United States) Atlas SLV-3C Centaur-D		(United States) Cape Kennedy LC-36B		(United States)	
30 May; 22:23:04	(United States) Mariner 9	NASA	Areocentric	Mars orbiter	In orbit	Successful
30 May; 22:23:04	First spacecraft to orbit Mars upon orbital insertion on 14 November. Deactivated on 27 October 1972					
=== June ===
4 June; 18:10:00	(Soviet Union) Kosmos-3M		(Soviet Union) Plesetsk 132/2		(Soviet Union)	
4 June; 18:10:00	(Soviet Union) Kosmos 426 (DS-U2-K No.1)		Low Earth	Magnetospheric	11 May 2002	Successful
4 June; 18:10:00	Ceased operations on 12 January 1972					
6 June; 04:55:09	(Soviet Union) Soyuz		(Soviet Union) Baikonur 1/5		(Soviet Union)	
6 June; 04:55:09	(Soviet Union) Soyuz 11		Low Earth (Salyut 1)	Crewed	29 June; 23:16:52	Spacecraft failure
6 June; 04:55:09	Crewed flight with three cosmonauts. First mission to occupy a space station, and only mission to occupy Salyut 1. Crew killed by depressurisation of spacecraft during reentry					
8 June; 14:00:05	(United States) Thor LV-2F Burner II		(United States) Vandenberg SLC-10W		(United States) US Air Force	
8 June; 14:00:05	(United States) SESP-1 (P70-1)	US Air Force/STP	Low Earth	Technology	31 January 1982	Successful
8 June; 14:00:05	Final flight of Thor LV-2F Burner II					
11 June; 10:00	(Soviet Union) Voskhod		(Soviet Union) Plesetsk 43/4		(Soviet Union)	
11 June; 10:00	(Soviet Union) Kosmos 427 (Zenit-4MK)		Low Earth	Optical imaging	23 June	Successful
15 June; 18:41	(United States) Titan III(23)D		(United States) Vandenberg SLC-4E		(United States) US Air Force	
15 June; 18:41	(United States) OPS 8709 (Hexagon 1201)	NRO	Low Earth	Optical imaging	6 August	Successful
15 June; 18:41	(United States) OPS 8709 SRV-1	NRO	Low Earth	Film return	20 June	Partial spacecraft failure
15 June; 18:41	(United States) OPS 8709 SRV-2	NRO	Low Earth	Film return	26 June	Successful
15 June; 18:41	(United States) OPS 8709 SRV-3	NRO	Low Earth	Film return	10 July	Spacecraft failure
15 June; 18:41	(United States) OPS 8709 SRV-4	NRO	Low Earth	Film return	15 July	Successful
15 June; 18:41	Maiden flight of Titan IIID, first Hexagon satellite. SRV-1 recovered from water, SRV-3 lost due to parachute failure					
24 June; 07:59	(Soviet Union) Voskhod		(Soviet Union) Baikonur 31/6		(Soviet Union)	
24 June; 07:59	(Soviet Union) Kosmos 428 (Zenit-2M)		Low Earth	Optical imaging	6 July	Successful
24 June; 07:59	(Soviet Union) Nauka 1KS No.4		Low Earth		13 July	Successful
25 June	(Soviet Union) Voskhod		(Soviet Union) Plesetsk 43/3		(Soviet Union)	
25 June	(Soviet Union) Zenit-4M		Intended: Low Earth	Optical imaging	25 June	Launch failure
26 June; 23:15:08	(Soviet Union) N1		(Soviet Union) Baikonur 110/37		(Soviet Union)	
26 June; 23:15:08	(Soviet Union) Soyuz 7K-LOK mockup		Intended: Highly elliptical	Test flight	+51 seconds	Launch failure
26 June; 23:15:08	(Soviet Union) LK mockup		Intended: Highly elliptical	Test flight	+51 seconds	Launch failure
26 June; 23:15:08	Loss of roll control, vehicle disintegrated at max Q					
=== July ===
8 July; 22:58:00	(United States) Scout B		(United States) Wallops LA-3A		(United States) NASA	
8 July; 22:58:00	(United States) Explorer 44 (Solrad 10)	NASA	Low Earth	Solar	15 December 1979	Successful
16 July; 01:41:36	(Soviet Union) Vostok-2M		(Soviet Union) Plesetsk 43/4		(Soviet Union)	
16 July; 01:41:36	(Soviet Union) Meteor 1-09 (Meteor-M)		Sun-synchronous	Weather	27 August 1991	Successful
16 July; 10:50	(United States) Thorad SLV-2H Agena-D		(United States) Vandenberg SLC-1W		(United States) US Air Force	
16 July; 10:50	(United States) OPS 8373 ("Heavy Ferret")	NRO	Low Earth	ELINT	31 August 1978	Successful
20 July; 10:00	(Soviet Union) Voskhod		(Soviet Union) Baikonur 31/6		(Soviet Union)	
20 July; 10:00	(Soviet Union) Kosmos 429 (Zenit-4M)		Low Earth	Optical imaging	2 August	Successful
22 July	(Soviet Union) Kosmos-3M		(Soviet Union) Plesetsk 132/2		(Soviet Union)	
22 July	(Soviet Union) Tselina-OM		Intended: Low Earth	ELINT	22 July	Launch failure
22 July	Failed to orbit					
23 July; 11:00	(Soviet Union) Voskhod		(Soviet Union) Plesetsk 43/3		(Soviet Union)	
23 July; 11:00	(Soviet Union) Kosmos 430 (Zenit-4M)		Low Earth	Optical imaging	5 August	Successful
26 July; 13:34	(United States) Saturn V		(United States) Kennedy LC-39A		(United States) NASA	
26 July; 13:34	(United States) Apollo 15 CSM	NASA	Selenocentric	Lunar orbiter	7 August; 20:45:53	Successful
26 July; 13:34	(United States) Apollo 15 LM	NASA	Selenocentric	Lunar lander	30 July; 22:16:29	Successful
26 July; 13:34	(United States) PFS-1	NASA	Selenocentric	Magnetospheric	1974	Successful
26 July; 13:34	Crewed flight with three astronauts, fourth crewed lunar landing and first use of Lunar Roving Vehicle, subsatellite deployed on 4 August at 20:13 UTC					
28 July; 03:29	(Soviet Union) Molniya-M/ML		(Soviet Union) Plesetsk 43/4		(Soviet Union)	
28 July; 03:29	(Soviet Union) Molniya 1-18		Molniya	Communications	19 July 1977	Successful
30 July; 08:29	(Soviet Union) Voskhod		(Soviet Union) Baikonur 31/6		(Soviet Union)	
30 July; 08:29	(Soviet Union) Kosmos 431 (Zenit-2M)		Low Earth	Optical imaging	11 August	Successful
=== August ===
3 August; 11:00:00	(Soviet Union) Kosmos-2I		(Soviet Union) Plesetsk 133/1		(Soviet Union)	
3 August; 11:00:00	(Soviet Union) DS-P1-Yu No.33		Intended: Low Earth	Radar calibration	+204 seconds	Launch failure
3 August; 11:00:00	Second stage malfunction, failed to orbit					
5 August; 10:00	(Soviet Union) Voskhod		(Soviet Union) Baikonur 31/6		(Soviet Union)	
5 August; 10:00	(Soviet Union) Kosmos 432 (Zenit-4M)	GRU	Low Earth	Optical imaging	18 August	Successful
7 August; 00:11	(United States) Atlas E/F-OV1-PM		(United States) Vandenberg BMRS-A2		(United States) US Air Force	
7 August; 00:11	(United States) OV1-20	US Air Force	Low Earth	Ionospheric	29 August	Successful
7 August; 00:11	(United States) OV1-21	US Air Force	Low Earth	Ionospheric	29 August	Successful
7 August; 00:11	(United States) LOADS-2	US Air Force	Low Earth	Air density	31 January 1972	Successful
7 August; 00:11	(United States) RTDS	US Air Force	Low Earth	Air density	19 September	Successful
7 August; 00:11	(United States) LCS 4	US Air Force	Low Earth	Air density	In orbit	Operational
7 August; 00:11	(United States) Gridsphere 1 (P70-2/AVL-802)	US Air Force	Low Earth	Technology	2 November 1979	Successful
7 August; 00:11	(United States) Gridsphere 2 (P70-2/AVL-802)	US Air Force	Low Earth	Technology	18 March 1979	Successful
7 August; 00:11	(United States) Gridsphere B (P70-2/AVL-802)	US Air Force	Low Earth	Technology	11 June 1972	Successful
7 August; 00:11	(United States) Rigidsphere (P70-2/AVL-802)	US Air Force	Low Earth	Air density	1 September 1981	Successful
7 August; 00:11	Two OV1 satellites deployed by independent upper stages, LOADS-2 shared upper stage with OV1-20, other payloads shared with OV1-21. All payloads passive other than OV1s.					
8 August; 23:45	(Soviet Union) R-36OM		(Soviet Union) Baikonur 191/66		(Soviet Union)	
8 August; 23:45	(Soviet Union) Kosmos 433 (OGCh)	RVSN	Low Earth	FOBS test	9 August	Successful
8 August; 23:45	Final flight of R-36OM, and FOBS programme					
12 August; 05:30	(Soviet Union) Soyuz-L		(Soviet Union) Baikonur 31/6		(Soviet Union)	
12 August; 05:30	(Soviet Union) Kosmos 434 (LK T2K No.3)		Deployed: Low Earth; Final: Medium Earth	Test flight	23 August 1981	Successful
12 August; 05:30	Final flight of Soyuz-L					
12 August; 15:30	(United States) Titan III(24)B		(United States) Vandenberg SLC-4W		(United States) US Air Force	
12 August; 15:30	(United States) OPS 8607 (Gambit-3 4332)	NRO	Low Earth	Optical imaging	3 September	Successful
12 August; 15:30	(United States) OPS 8607 SRV-1	NRO	Low Earth	Film return	August	Successful
12 August; 15:30	(United States) OPS 8607 SRV-2	NRO	Low Earth	Film return	September	Successful
12 August; 15:30	Maiden flight of Titan III(24)B					
16 August; 18:39:00	(United States) Scout B-1		(United States) Wallops LA-3A		(United States) NASA	
16 August; 18:39:00	(France) Eole	CNES	Low Earth	Communications	In orbit	Successful
16 August; 18:39:00	Maiden flight of Scout B-1					
19 August	(Soviet Union) Voskhod		(Soviet Union) Baikonur 31/6		(Soviet Union)	
19 August	(Soviet Union) Zenit-4M		Intended: Low Earth	Optical imaging	19 August	Launch failure
19 August	Failed to achieve orbit					
27 August; 10:54:56	(Soviet Union) Kosmos-2I		(Soviet Union) Plesetsk 133/1		(Soviet Union)	
27 August; 10:54:56	(Soviet Union) Kosmos 435 (DS-P1-Yu No.41)		Low Earth	Calibration	28 January 1972	Successful
=== September ===
2 September; 13:40:40	(Soviet Union) Proton-K/D		(Soviet Union) Baikonur 81/24		(Soviet Union)	
2 September; 13:40:40	(Soviet Union) Luna 18		Highly elliptical	Lunar sample return	11 September	Spacecraft failure
2 September; 13:40:40	Failed to achieve soft landing, instead impacting the moon					
7 September; 01:15	(Soviet Union) Kosmos-3M		(Soviet Union) Plesetsk 132/2		(Soviet Union)	
7 September; 01:15	(Soviet Union) Kosmos 436 (Tselina-OM)		Low Earth	ELINT	4 January 1980	Successful
10 September; 03:37	(Soviet Union) Kosmos-3M		(Soviet Union) Plesetsk 132/2		(Soviet Union)	
10 September; 03:37	(Soviet Union) Kosmos 437 (Tselina-OM)		Low Earth	ELINT	29 March 1980	Successful
10 September; 21:33	(United States) Thorad SLV-2H Agena-D		(United States) Vandenberg SLC-3W		(United States) US Air Force	
10 September; 21:33	(United States) OPS 5454 (KH-4B No.1115)	NRO	Low Earth	Optical imaging	5 October	
10 September; 21:33	(United States) OPS 7681 (EHH-B)	NRO	Low Earth	ELINT	3 February 1976	
14 September; 13:00	(Soviet Union) Voskhod		(Soviet Union) Plesetsk 43/4		(Soviet Union)	
14 September; 13:00	(Soviet Union) Kosmos 438 (Zenit-4MK)		Low Earth	Optical imaging	23 June	Successful
21 September; 12:00	(Soviet Union) Voskhod		(Soviet Union) Plesetsk 43/3		(Soviet Union)	
21 September; 12:00	(Soviet Union) Kosmos 439 (Zenit-2M)		Low Earth	Optical imaging	2 October	Successful
24 September; 10:30:00	(Soviet Union) Kosmos-2I		(Soviet Union) Plesetsk 133/1		(Soviet Union)	
24 September; 10:30:00	(Soviet Union) Kosmos 440 (DS-P1-I No.11)		Low Earth	Radar target	29 October 1972	Successful
28 September; 04:00:00	(Japan) Mu-3S		(Japan) Kagoshima LA-M		(Japan) ISAS	
28 September; 04:00:00	(Japan) Shinsei	ISAS	Low Earth	Solar; Ionospheric	In orbit	Successful
28 September; 07:40	(Soviet Union) Voskhod		(Soviet Union) Baikonur 31/6		(Soviet Union)	
28 September; 07:40	(Soviet Union) Kosmos 441 (Zenit-4M)		Low Earth	Optical imaging	10 October	Successful
28 September; 10:00:22	(Soviet Union) Proton-K/D		(Soviet Union) Baikonur 81/24		(Soviet Union)	
28 September; 10:00:22	(Soviet Union) Luna 19		Selenocentric	Lunar orbiter	In orbit	Successful
29 September; 09:45:00	(United States) Delta N		(United States) Cape Kennedy LC-17A		(United States)	
29 September; 09:45:00	(United States) OSO-7	NASA	Low Earth	Solar	9 July 1974	Successful
29 September; 09:45:00	(United States) TETR-4	NASA	Low Earth	Tracking target	19 September 1978	Successful
29 September; 11:30	(Soviet Union) Voskhod		(Soviet Union) Plesetsk 43/3		(Soviet Union)	
29 September; 11:30	(Soviet Union) Kosmos 442 (Zenit-4M)		Low Earth	Optical imaging	12 October	Successful
=== October ===
7 October; 12:30	(Soviet Union) Voskhod		(Soviet Union) Plesetsk 43/3		(Soviet Union)	
7 October; 12:30	(Soviet Union) Kosmos 443 (Zenit-2M)		Low Earth	Optical imaging	19 October	Successful
7 October; 12:30	(Soviet Union) Nauka 8KS No.2		Low Earth		30 October	Successful
13 October; 13:41	(Soviet Union) Kosmos-3M		(Soviet Union) Plesetsk 132/2		(Soviet Union)	
13 October; 13:41	(Soviet Union) Kosmos 444 (Strela-1M)		Low Earth	Communications	In orbit	Successful
13 October; 13:41	(Soviet Union) Kosmos 445 (Strela-1M)		Low Earth	Communications	In orbit	Successful
13 October; 13:41	(Soviet Union) Kosmos 446 (Strela-1M)		Low Earth	Communications	In orbit	Successful
13 October; 13:41	(Soviet Union) Kosmos 447 (Strela-1M)		Low Earth	Communications	In orbit	Successful
13 October; 13:41	(Soviet Union) Kosmos 448 (Strela-1M)		Low Earth	Communications	In orbit	Successful
13 October; 13:41	(Soviet Union) Kosmos 449 (Strela-1M)		Low Earth	Communications	In orbit	Successful
13 October; 13:41	(Soviet Union) Kosmos 450 (Strela-1M)		Low Earth	Communications	In orbit	Successful
13 October; 13:41	(Soviet Union) Kosmos 451 (Strela-1M)		Low Earth	Communications	In orbit	Successful
14 October; 07:51:17	(United States) Thor LV-2F Burner IIA		(United States) Vandenberg SLC-10W		(United States) US Air Force	
14 October; 07:51:17	(United States) OPS 4311 (DAPP-5B F-1)	US Air Force	Low Earth	Weather	In orbit	Successful
14 October; 07:51:17	Maiden flight of Thor LV-2F Burner IIA					
14 October; 09:00	(Soviet Union) Voskhod		(Soviet Union) Baikonur 31/6		(Soviet Union)	
14 October; 09:00	(Soviet Union) Kosmos 452 (Zenit-4M)		Low Earth	Optical imaging	27 October	Successful
17 October; 13:36	(United States) Thorad SLV-2G Agena-D		(United States) Vandenberg SLC-1W		(United States) US Air Force	
17 October; 13:36	(United States) ASTEX (P71-2)	STP	Low Earth	Technology	In orbit	Successful
19 October; 12:40:01	(Soviet Union) Kosmos-2I		(Soviet Union) Plesetsk 133/1		(Soviet Union)	
19 October; 12:40:01	(Soviet Union) Kosmos 453 (DS-P1-Yu No.44)		Low Earth	Calibration	19 March 1972	Successful
21 October; 11:32:00	(United States) Delta N6		(United States) Vandenberg SLC-2E		(United States)	
21 October; 11:32:00	(United States) ITOS-B	NOAA	Intended: Low Earth	Weather	21 October	Launch failure
21 October; 11:32:00	Final flight of Delta N6, oxidiser leak led to premature second stage cutoff. Debris reached orbit, however payload did not					
23 October; 17:01	(United States) Titan III(24)B		(United States) Vandenberg SLC-4W		(United States) US Air Force	
23 October; 17:01	(United States) OPS 7616 (Gambit-3 4333)	NRO	Low Earth	Optical imaging	17 November	Successful
23 October; 17:01	(United States) OPS 7616 SRV-1	NRO	Low Earth	Film return	October/November	Successful
23 October; 17:01	(United States) OPS 7616 SRV-2	NRO	Low Earth	Film return	November	Successful
28 October; 04:09:29	(United Kingdom) Black Arrow		(Australia) Woomera LA-5B		(United Kingdom) RAE	
28 October; 04:09:29	(United Kingdom) Prospero (X-3)	RAE	Low Earth	Technology	In orbit	Successful
28 October; 04:09:29	First and only successful British orbital launch, final flight of Black Arrow and last orbital launch from Woomera					
=== November ===
2 November; 14:25	(Soviet Union) Voskhod		(Soviet Union) Plesetsk 41/1		(Soviet Union)	
2 November; 14:25	(Soviet Union) Kosmos 454 (Zenit-4M)		Low Earth	Optical imaging	16 November	Successful
3 November; 03:09:06	(United States) Titan III(23)C		(United States) Cape Kennedy LC-40		(United States) US Air Force	
3 November; 03:09:06	(United States) OPS 3431 (DSCS II A1)	US Air Force	Geosynchronous	Communications	In orbit	Successful
3 November; 03:09:06	(United States) OPS 9432 (DSCS II A2)	US Air Force	Geosynchronous	Communications	In orbit	
5 November; 13:00	(European Union) Europa II		(France) Kourou BEC		(European Union) ELDO	
5 November; 13:00	(European Union) STV-4	ELDO	Intended: Geosynchronous transfer	Technology	5 November	Launch failure
5 November; 13:00	Third stage structural failure. Only flight of Europa II, and final flight of Europa family. Final launch conducted by ELDO, first launch from BEC (later ELA-1 and ELV)					
15 November; 05:52:00	(United States) Scout B		(Italy) San Marco mobile range, Kenya		(Italy) CRS	
15 November; 05:52:00	(United States) Explorer 45 (SSS-A)	NASA	Medium Earth	Magnetospheric	10 January 1992	Successful
15 November; 05:52:00	Final flight of Scout B					
17 November; 11:09:48	(Soviet Union) Kosmos-2I		(Soviet Union) Plesetsk 133/1		(Soviet Union)	
17 November; 11:09:48	(Soviet Union) Kosmos 455 (DS-P1-Yu No.54)		Low Earth	Calibration	9 April 1972	Successful
19 November; 12:00	(Soviet Union) Voskhod		(Soviet Union) Plesetsk 43/3		(Soviet Union)	
19 November; 12:00	(Soviet Union) Kosmos 456 (Zenit-4M)		Low Earth	Optical imaging	2 December	Successful
20 November; 18:00	(Soviet Union) Kosmos-3M		(Soviet Union) Plesetsk 132/2		(Soviet Union)	
20 November; 18:00	(Soviet Union) Kosmos 457 (Sfera)		Low Earth	Geodesy	In orbit	Successful
24 November; 09:30	(Soviet Union) Molniya-M/ML		(Soviet Union) Plesetsk 43/4		(Soviet Union)	
24 November; 09:30	(Soviet Union) Molniya 2-01		Molniya	Communications	10 May 1976	Successful
29 November; 10:09:56	(Soviet Union) Kosmos-2I		(Soviet Union) Plesetsk 133/1		(Soviet Union)	
29 November; 10:09:56	(Soviet Union) Kosmos 458 (DS-P1-Yu No.53)		Low Earth	Calibration	20 April 1972	Successful
29 November; 17:30:00	(Soviet Union) Kosmos-3M		(Soviet Union) Plesetsk 132/1		(Soviet Union)	
29 November; 17:30:00	(Soviet Union) Kosmos 459 (DS-P1-M No.5)		Low Earth	ASAT target	3 December (destroyed)	Successful
29 November; 17:30:00	Destroyed by Kosmos 462					
30 November; 16:39	(Soviet Union) Kosmos-3M		(Soviet Union) Plesetsk 132/2		(Soviet Union)	
30 November; 16:39	(Soviet Union) Kosmos 460 (Tselina-OM)		Low Earth	ELINT	5 March 1980	Successful
=== December ===
2 December; 08:25:14	(Soviet Union) Kosmos-2I		(Soviet Union) Kapustin Yar 86/4		(Soviet Union)	
2 December; 08:25:14	(United Nations) Interkosmos 5 (DS-U2-IK No.2)	Interkosmos	Low Earth	Ionosphere and magnetosphere research	7 April 1972	Successful
2 December; 08:25:14	Cooperative project of Czechoslovakia and the USSR					
2 December; 17:30:01	(Soviet Union) Kosmos-3M		(Soviet Union) Plesetsk 132/1		(Soviet Union)	
2 December; 17:30:01	(Soviet Union) Kosmos 461 (DS-U2-MT No.1)		Low Earth	Micrometeoroid detection gamma-ray astronomy	21 February 1979	Successful
2 December; 17:30:01	Ceased operations on 14 December 1972					
3 December; 13:19	(Soviet Union) Tsyklon-2		(Soviet Union) Baikonur 90/19		(Soviet Union)	
3 December; 13:19	(Soviet Union) Kosmos 462 (IS-A)		Low Earth	ASAT test	4 April 1975	Successful
3 December; 13:19	Intercepted and destroyed Kosmos 459					
3 December	(Soviet Union) Voskhod		(Soviet Union) Plesetsk 43/4		(Soviet Union)	
3 December	(Soviet Union) Zenit-2M		Intended: Low Earth	Optical imaging	3 December	Launch failure
3 December	(Soviet Union) Nauka 5KS No.2		Intended: Low Earth		3 December	Launch failure
4 December; 22:33	(United States) Atlas SLV-3A Agena-D		(United States) Cape Kennedy LC-13		(United States) US Air Force	
4 December; 22:33	(United States) Canyon	US Air Force	Intended: Geosynchronous	ELINT	4 December	Launch failure
4 December; 22:33	First stage malfunctioned, failed to orbit					
5 December; 16:20	(France) Diamant B		(France) Kourou ALD		(France) CNES	
5 December; 16:20	(France) Polaire	CNES	Intended: Low Earth	Ionospheric	5 December	Launch failure
5 December; 16:20	Second stage malfunction, failed to orbit					
6 December; 09:50	(Soviet Union) Voskhod		(Soviet Union) Baikonur 31/6		(Soviet Union)	
6 December; 09:50	(Soviet Union) Kosmos 463 (Zenit-4M)		Low Earth	Optical imaging	11 December	Successful
10 December; 11:00	(Soviet Union) Voskhod		(Soviet Union) Plesetsk 43/3		(Soviet Union)	
10 December; 11:00	(Soviet Union) Kosmos 464 (Zenit-4M)		Low Earth	Optical imaging	16 December	Successful
11 December; 20:47:01	(United States) Scout B-1		(United States) Vandenberg SLC-5		(United States) NASA	
11 December; 20:47:01	(United Kingdom) Ariel 4	SRC	Low Earth	Ionospheric	12 December 1978	Successful
14 December; 12:13	(United States) Thorad SLV-2G Agena-D		(United States) Vandenberg SLC-1W		(United States) US Air Force	
14 December; 12:13	(United States) OPS 7898 Payload 1 (Poppy)	NRO	Low Earth	ELINT	In orbit	Successful
14 December; 12:13	(United States) OPS 7898 Payload 2	NRO	Low Earth	ELINT	In orbit	Successful
14 December; 12:13	(United States) OPS 7898 Payload 3	NRO	Low Earth	ELINT	In orbit	Successful
14 December; 12:13	(United States) OPS 7898 Payload 4	NRO	Low Earth	ELINT	In orbit	Successful
14 December; 12:13	Final flight of Thorad SLV-2G Agena-D					
15 December; 04:31	(Soviet Union) Kosmos-3M		(Soviet Union) Plesetsk 132/2		(Soviet Union)	
15 December; 04:31	(Soviet Union) Kosmos 465 (Tsyklon)		Low Earth	Navigation	In orbit	Successful
16 December; 09:39	(Soviet Union) Voskhod		(Soviet Union) Baikonur 31/6		(Soviet Union)	
16 December; 09:39	(Soviet Union) Kosmos 466 (Zenit-4M)		Low Earth	Optical imaging	18 August	Successful
17 December; 10:39:58	(Soviet Union) Kosmos-2I		(Soviet Union) Plesetsk 133/1		(Soviet Union)	
17 December; 10:39:58	(Soviet Union) Kosmos 467 (DS-P1-Yu No.45)		Low Earth	Calibration	18 April 1972	Successful
17 December; 13:00	(Soviet Union) Kosmos-3M		(Soviet Union) Plesetsk 132/2		(Soviet Union)	
17 December; 13:00	(Soviet Union) Kosmos 468 (Strela-2M)		Low Earth	Communications	In orbit	Successful
19 December; 22:50	(Soviet Union) Molniya-M/ML		(Soviet Union) Plesetsk 41/1		(Soviet Union)	
19 December; 22:50	(Soviet Union) Molniya 1-19		Molniya	Communications	13 April 1977	Successful
20 December; 01:10:04	(United States) Atlas SLV-3C Centaur-D		(United States) Cape Kennedy LC-36A		(United States)	
20 December; 01:10:04	(United Nations) Intelsat IV F-3	Intelsat	Geosynchronous	Communications	In orbit	Successful
25 December; 11:30	(Soviet Union) Tsyklon-2		(Soviet Union) Baikonur 90/20		(Soviet Union)	
25 December; 11:30	(Soviet Union) Kosmos 469 (US-A)		Low Earth	Ocean surveillance	9 February 1972	Successful
25 December; 11:30	BES-5 nuclear reactor ejected, and remains in orbit					
27 December; 14:04	(Soviet Union) Soyuz-M		(Soviet Union) Plesetsk 43/4		(Soviet Union)	
27 December; 14:04	(Soviet Union) Kosmos 470 (Zenit-4MT)		Low Earth	Optical imaging	6 January 1972	Successful
27 December; 14:04	Maiden flight of Soyuz-M					
27 December; 19:00:00	(Soviet Union) Kosmos-3M		(Soviet Union) Plesetsk 132/2		(Soviet Union)	
27 December; 19:00:00	(Soviet Union) (France) Oreol 1 (DS-U2-GKA No.1)	OKB-586/CNES	Medium Earth	Magnetospheric	In orbit	Successful
29 December; 10:50:01	(Soviet Union) Vostok-2M		(Soviet Union) Plesetsk 41/1		(Soviet Union)	
29 December; 10:50:01	(Soviet Union) Meteor 1-10 (Meteor-MV)		Sun-synchronous	Weather	In orbit	Successful

- ← Jan
- Feb
- Mar
- Apr
- May
- Jun
- Jul
- Aug
- Sep
- Oct
- Nov
- Dec →

== Launches from the Moon ==
Date and time (UTC)	Rocket	Flight number	Launch site		LSP	
Date and time (UTC)	Payload (⚀ = CubeSat)	Operator	Orbit	Function	Decay (UTC)	Outcome
Date and time (UTC)	Remarks					
6 February; 18:48	(United States) Lunar Module Ascent Stage		Fra Mauro (Luna)		(United States) NASA	
6 February; 18:48	(United States) Apollo 14 LM	NASA	Selenocentric (CSM)	Crewed	7 February; 00:46	Successful
6 February; 18:48	Carrying two astronauts back to CSM after lunar landing					
2 August; 17:11	(United States) Lunar Module Ascent Stage		Hadley-Apennine (Luna)		(United States) NASA	
2 August; 17:11	(United States) Apollo 15 LM	NASA	Selenocentric (CSM)	Crewed	3 August; 03:04	Successful
2 August; 17:11	Carrying two astronauts back to CSM after lunar landing					

== Suborbital launches ==
Date and time (UTC)	Rocket	Flight number	Launch site		LSP	
Date and time (UTC)	Payload	Operator	Orbit	Function	Decay (UTC)	Outcome
Date and time (UTC)	Remarks					
=== January-March ===
13 January; 20:10	(Canada) Black Brant II		(Canada) Churchill		(Canada) NRC	
13 January; 20:10	(Canada)	NRC	Suborbital	Aeronomy	13 January	Successful
21 January; 02:32	(Canada) Black Brant VB		(Canada) Churchill		(Canada) NRC	
21 January; 02:32	(Canada)	NRC	Suborbital	Auroral/Ionospheric	21 January	Successful
22 January; 04:44	(Canada) Black Brant VB		(Canada) Churchill		(Canada) NRC	
22 January; 04:44	(Canada)	NRC	Suborbital	Auroral/Ionospheric	22 January	Successful
26 January; 17:23	(Canada) Black Brant VB		(Canada) Churchill		(Canada) NRC	
26 January; 17:23	(Canada)	NRC	Suborbital	Solar/Ionospheric	26 January	Successful
5 February; 22:46	(Canada) Black Brant IVB		(Canada) Churchill		(Canada) NRC	
5 February; 22:46	(Canada)	NRC	Suborbital	Auroral/Ionospheric	5 February	Successful
5 February; 22:46	(Canada) Black Brant IVB		(Canada) Churchill		(Canada) NRC	
5 February; 22:46	(Canada)	NRC	Suborbital	Auroral/Ionospheric	5 February	Successful
20 February; 03:33	(Canada) Black Brant IVA		(Canada) Churchill		(Canada) NRC	
20 February; 03:33	(Canada)	NRC	Suborbital	Auroral/Ionospheric	20 February	Successful
25 February; 01:13	(Canada) Black Brant VB		(United States) Wallops Island		(United States) NASA	
25 February; 01:13	(United States)	NASA	Suborbital	Aeronomy	25 February	Successful
3 March; 06:52	(Canada) Black Brant IVA		(Canada) Churchill		(Canada) NRC	
3 March; 06:52	(Canada)	NRC	Suborbital	Auroral	3 March	Successful
20 March; 03:24	(Canada) Black Brant II		(Canada) Churchill		(Canada) NRC	
20 March; 03:24	(Canada)	NRC	Suborbital	Test flight Auroral/Ionospheric	20 March	Successful
20 March; 03:24	(Canada) Black Brant II		(Canada) Churchill		(Canada) NRC	
20 March; 03:24	(Canada)	NRC	Suborbital	Test flight Auroral/Ionospheric	20 March	Successful
=== April-June ===
5 April	(United States) Atlas E/F		(United States) Vandenberg ABRES A-1		(United States) US Air Force	
5 April	(United States) LAR-1	US Air Force	Suborbital	REV test	5 April	Successful
22 April; 04:22	(Soviet Union) K63D		(Soviet Union) Vladimirovka test range, near Kapustin Yar			
22 April; 04:22	(Soviet Union) BOR-2 No.103		Suborbital	Re-entry test for Spiral program	22 April	Successful
22 April; 04:22	Subscale model of the Spiral spaceplane. Apogee: 100 km					
7 June; 05:26	(Canada) Black Brant IVA		(Canada) Churchill		(Canada) AFCRL	
7 June; 05:26	(Canada)	AFCRL	Suborbital	Ionospheric	7 June	Successful
20 June; 22:45	(United States) LGM-25C Titan II		(United States) Vandenberg LC-395C		(United States) US Air Force	
20 June; 22:45	(United States) SSTTP M1-17	US Air Force	Suborbital	Target	20 June	Successful
29 June; 10:12	(United States) Atlas E/F-Trident		(United States) Vandenberg ABRES A-3		(United States) US Air Force	
29 June; 10:12	(United States) RVTO-2A-3	US Air Force	Suborbital	REV test	29 June	Successful
=== July-September ===
21 July; 16:00	(Canada) Black Brant VC		(United States) Wallops Island		(United States) NASA	
21 July; 16:00	(United States)	NASA	Suborbital	Test flight	21 July	Launch failure
28 August; 02:22	(United States) LGM-25C Titan II		(United States) Vandenberg LC-395C		(United States) US Air Force	
28 August; 02:22	(United States) SSTTP M2-1	US Air Force	Suborbital	Target	28 August	Successful
1 September	(United States) Atlas E/F		(United States) Vandenberg BMRS A-1		(United States) US Air Force	
1 September	(United States) LAR-2	US Air Force	Suborbital	REV test	1 September	Successful
4 September; 13:52	(Canada) Black Brant IIIB		(United States) Resolute Bay		(United States) NASA	
4 September; 13:52	(United States)	NASA	Suborbital	Plasma physics	4 September	Successful
5 September; 13:44	(Canada) Black Brant IIIB		(United States) Resolute Bay		(United States) NASA	
5 September; 13:44	(United States)	NASA	Suborbital	Plasma physics	5 September	Successful
10 September	(China) Dongfeng 5		(China) Jiuquan LA-2B		(China) CALT	
10 September	(China)	CALT	Suborbital	Test flight	10 September	Successful
10 September	Maiden flight of Dongfeng 5					
20 September; 23:31	(United States) Scout B	166CR	(United States) Wallops Island, LA-3A		(United States) NASA	
20 September; 23:31	(West Germany) Barium Ion Cloud (BIC)	MPE, NASA	Suborbital	Magnetosphere research	21 September	Successful
20 September; 23:31	Apogee: 31479 km					
=== October-December ===
15 November	(China) Dongfeng 4		(China) Jiuquan		People's Liberation Army 2nd Artillery Corps	
15 November	(China)	PLA	Suborbital	Missile test	15 November	Successful

== Deep space rendezvous in 1971 ==
Date (UTC)	Spacecraft	Event	Remarks
4 February	Apollo 14	Entered selenocentric orbit	
5 February; 09:18:11	Apollo 14 LM	Landing on the Moon	Landed in Fra Mauro region, returned 43 kg of rocks
29 July	Apollo 15	Entered selenocentric orbit	
30 July; 22:16:29	Apollo 15 LM	Landing on the Moon; first crewed lunar rover	Landed in Hadley Rille region, returned 77 kg of rocks
11 September	Luna 18	Impacted the Moon	In Mare Fecunditatis, failed lander
3 October	Luna 19	Entered selenocentric orbit	
14 November	Mariner 9	Entered areocentric orbit	First orbiter of Mars and of another planet
27 November	Mars 2 orbiter	Entered areocentric orbit	
27 November	Mars 2 lander	First Mars impact	Failed soft lander
27 November	Mars 3 orbiter	Entered areocentric orbit	
27 November	Mars 3 lander	First soft landing on Mars	

== EVAs ==
Start date/time	Duration	End time	Spacecraft	Crew	Remarks
5 February; 14:42	4 hours 48 minutes	19:30	Apollo 14; Apollo LM-8 Antares	(United States) Alan Shepard (United States) Edgar Mitchell	Shepard and Mitchell deployed several experiments on the lunar surface near the landing site, such as the Solar Wind Composition Experiment and the Apollo Lunar Surface Experiments Package (ALSEP). The crew also took a contingency sample and planted a U.S. flag at the site.
6 February; 8:11	4 hours 34 minutes	12:45	Apollo 14; Apollo LM-8 Antares	(United States) Alan Shepard (United States) Edgar Mitchell	Planned as a traverse to Cone Crater, however the astronauts were unable to find the rim of the crater amid rolling terrain. The crew also took panoramic pictures and set up additional experiments. Shepard famously hit a golf ball on the lunar surface, using a six iron golf club head attached to the handle of an excavation tool.
31 July; 00:16	33 minutes	00:49	Apollo 15; Apollo LM-10 Falcon	(United States) David Scott	Scott stood on the lander's ascent engine cover to survey the landing site through the vehicle's docking hatch and take panoramic photography.
31 July; 13:13	6 hours 32 minutes	19:45	Apollo 15; Apollo LM-10 Falcon	(United States) David Scott (United States) James Irwin	Scott and Irwin visited Elbow Crater near the rim of Hadley Rille using the Lunar Roving Vehicle (LRV), marking the first time humans traveled in a wheeled vehicle on another world. The crew also deployed an ALSEP on their return to the landing site.
1 August; 11:48	7 hours 12 minutes	19:01	Apollo 15; Apollo LM-10 Falcon	(United States) David Scott (United States) James Irwin	Scott and Irwin drove the LRV 12.5 miles along the base of the Apennine Mountains, visiting several craters, collecting samples and taking panoramic photography. The crew also took a deep core sample of lunar soil and planted a U.S. flag.
2 August; 08:52	4 hours 49 minutes	13:42	Apollo 15; Apollo LM-10 Falcon	(United States) David Scott (United States) James Irwin	Scott and Irwin traveled to Scarp Crater then northwest along the rille, collecting samples. The crew also retrieved the core sample drilled during the previous EVA.
5 August; 15:31	39 minutes	16:10	Apollo 15; Apollo CSM-112 Endeavour	(United States) Alfred Worden (United States) James Irwin	First spacewalk in deep space, conducted during the return trip to Earth. Worden retrieved exposed film from the Scientific Instrument Module (SIM) bay of the Service Module, while Irwin stood in the hatch.

== Orbital launch statistics ==
=== By country ===
Country	Launches	Successes	Failures	Partial failures
Europe	1	0	1	0
Japan	2	2	0	0
China	1	1	0	0
Soviet Union	91	82	9	0
United Kingdom	1 (Note: Last and only successful launch)	1	0	0
United States	35	31	4	0
World	131	117	14	0

=== By rocket ===
==== By family ====
Family	Country	Launches	Successes	Failures	Partial failures	Remarks
Atlas	United States	6	4	2	0	
Black Arrow	United Kingdom	1	1	0	0	Final flight
Diamant	France	2	1	1	0	
Europa	ELDO Members Belgium; France; West Germany; Netherlands; United Kingdom; Australia	1	0	1	0	Final flight
Kosmos (R-12/14)	Soviet Union	34	31	3	0	
Long March	China	1	1	0	0	
Mu	Japan	2	2	0	0	
N	Soviet Union	1	0	1	0	
R-7	Soviet Union	44	40	4	0	
R-36	Soviet Union	6	6	0	0	
Saturn	United States	2	2	0	0	
Titan	United States	8	8	0	0	
Thor	United States	14	12	2	0	
Scout	United States	5	5	0	0	
Universal Rocket	Soviet Union	6	5	1	0	

==== By type ====
Rocket	Country	Family	Launches	Successes	Failures	Partial failures	Remarks
Atlas E/F	United States	Atlas	1	1	0	0	
Atlas-Agena	United States	Atlas	1	0	1	0	
Atlas-Centaur	United States	Atlas	4	3	1	0	
Black Arrow	United Kingdom	Black Arrow	1	1	0	0	Final flight
Diamant B	France	Diamant	2	1	1	0	
Delta	United States	Delta	5	4	1	0	
Europa	ELDO Members Belgium; France; West Germany; Netherlands; United Kingdom; Australia	Europa	1	0	1	0	Final flight
Kosmos-2	Soviet Union	Kosmos	14	12	2	0	
Kosmos-3	Soviet Union	Kosmos	20	19	1	0	
Long March 1	China	Long March	1	1	0	0	
Molniya	Soviet Union	R-7	3	3	0	0	
Mu-3	Japan	Mu	2	2	0	0	
N1	Soviet Union	N	1	0	1	0	
Proton	Soviet Union	Universal Rocket	3	3	0	0	
R-36OM	Soviet Union	R-36	1	1	0	0	Final flight
Saturn V	United States	Saturn	2	2	0	0	
Scout B	United States	Scout	5	5	0	0	
Soyuz	Soviet Union	R-7	5	5	0	0	
Thor-Burner	United States	Thor	3	3	0	0	
Thorad-Agena	United States	Thor	6	5	1	0	
Titan IIIB	United States	Titan	5	5	0	0	
Titan IIIC	United States	Titan	2	2	0	0	
Titan IIID	United States	Titan	1	1	0	0	Maiden flight
Tsyklon	Soviet Union	R-36	5	5	0	0	
Voskhod	Soviet Union	R-7	31	27	4	0	
Vostok	Soviet Union	R-7	5	5	0	0	

==== By configuration ====
Rocket	Country	Type	Launches	Successes	Failures	Partial failures	Remarks
Atlas E/F-OV1-PM	United States	Atlas E/F	1	1	0	0	
Atlas SLV-3A Agena-D	United States	Atlas-Agena	1	0	1	0	
Atlas SLV-3C Centaur-D	United States	Atlas-Centaur	4	3	1	0	
Black Arrow	United Kingdom	Black Arrow	1	1	0	0	Final flight
Diamant B	France	Diamant B	2	1	1	0	
Delta E1	United States	Delta	1	1	0	0	Final flight
Delta M	United States	Delta	1	1	0	0	Final flight
Delta M6	United States	Delta	1	1	0	0	Only flight
Delta N	United States	Delta	1	1	0	0	
Delta N6	United States	Delta	1	0	1	0	Final flight
Europa II	ELDO Members Belgium; France; West Germany; Netherlands; United Kingdom; Australia	Europa	1	0	1	0	Only flight
Kosmos-2I	Soviet Union	Kosmos-2	14	12	2	0	
Kosmos-3M	Soviet Union	Kosmos-3	20	19	1	0	
Long March 1	China	Long March	1	1	0	0	Final flight
Molniya-M/ML	Soviet Union	Molniya	3	3	0	0	
Mu-3S	Japan	Mu-3	2	2	0	0	
N1	Soviet Union	N1	1	0	1	0	
Proton-K	Soviet Union	Proton	1	1	0	0	
Proton-K/D	Soviet Union	Proton	5	4	1	0	
R-36OM	Soviet Union	R-36O	1	1	0	0	Final flight
Saturn V	United States	Saturn V	2	2	0	0	
Scout B	United States	Scout B	3	3	0	0	
Scout B-1	United States	Scout B	2	2	0	0	
Soyuz	Soviet Union	Soyuz	2	2	0	0	
Soyuz-L	Soviet Union	Soyuz	2	2	0	0	Final flight
Soyuz-M	Soviet Union	Soyuz	1	1	0	0	Maiden flight
Thor LV-2F Burner II	United States	Thor-Burner	2	2	0	0	Final flight
Thor LV-2F Burner IIA	United States	Thor-Burner	1	1	0	0	Maiden flight
Thorad SLV-2G Agena-D	United States	Thorad-Agena	2	2	0	0	Final flight
Thorad SLV-2H Agena-D	United States	Thorad-Agena	4	3	1	0	
Titan III(23)B	United States	Titan III	2	2	0	0	Final flight
Titan III(24)B	United States	Titan III	2	2	0	0	Maiden flight
Titan III(33)B	United States	Titan III	1	1	0	0	Maiden flight
Titan III(23)C	United States	Titan III	2	2	0	0	
Titan III(23)D	United States	Titan III	1	1	0	0	Maiden flight
Tsyklon-2	Soviet Union	Tsyklon	5	5	0	0	
Voskhod	Soviet Union	Voskhod	31	27	4	0	
Vostok-2M	Soviet Union	Vostok	5	5	0	0	

=== By launch site ===
Site	Country	Launches	Successes	Failures	Partial failures	Remarks
Cape Kennedy	United States	10	5	2	0	
Baikonur	Soviet Union	31	28	3	0	
Jiuquan	China	1	1	0	0	
Kapustin Yar	Soviet Union	2	1	1	0	
Kennedy	United States	2	2	0	0	
Kagoshima	Japan	2	2	0	0	
Kourou	France	3	1	2	0	
Plesetsk	Soviet Union	58	53	5	0	
San Marco	Kenya	2	2	0	0	Operated by Italy
Vandenberg	United States	19	17	2	0	
Wallops	United States	2	2	0	0	
Woomera	Australia	1	1	0	0	Final orbital launch

=== By orbit ===
Orbital regime	Launches	Achieved	Not Achieved	Accidentally achieved	Remarks
Failed to orbit	N/A	N/A	N/A	12	
Low Earth	109	100	9	1	Two to Salyut 1
Medium Earth	2	2	0	0	
Geosynchronous/transfer	7	5	2		
High Earth	10	9	1	0	Including highly elliptical and Molniya orbits and trans-lunar trajectories.
Heliocentric	5	3	2	0	
