= Kosmos 461 =

Soviet gamma ray astronomy satellite

- Mission type: Astronomy; Micrometeoroids
- COSPAR ID: 1971-105A
- SATCAT no.: 05643

Spacecraft properties
- Spacecraft type: DS-U2-MT
- Manufacturer: Yuzhnoye
- Launch mass: 680 kilograms (1,500 lb)

Start of mission
- Launch date: 2 December 1971, 17:30:00 UTC
- Rocket: Kosmos-3M
- Launch site: Plesetsk 132/1

End of mission
- Decay date: 21 February 1979

Orbital parameters
- Reference system: Geocentric
- Regime: Low Earth
- Perigee altitude: 486 kilometres (302 mi)
- Apogee altitude: 508 kilometres (316 mi)
- Inclination: 69.2 degrees
- Period: 94.55 minutes

Kosmos 461 (Russian: Космос 461 meaning Cosmos 461), also known as DS-U2-MT No.1, was a Soviet satellite which was launched in 1971 as part of the Dnepropetrovsk Sputnik programme. It was a 680-kilogram (1,500 lb) spacecraft, which was built by the Yuzhnoye Design Bureau, and was used to investigate micrometeoroids and conduct gamma ray astronomy.

== Launch ==
A Kosmos-3M carrier rocket, serial number 47119-109, was used to launch Kosmos 461 into low Earth orbit. The launch took place from Site 132/1 at the Plesetsk Cosmodrome. The launch occurred at 17:30:00 UTC on 2 December 1971, and resulted in the successful insertion of the satellite into orbit.

== Orbit ==
Upon reaching orbit, the satellite was assigned its Kosmos designation, and received the International Designator 1971-105A. The North American Aerospace Defense Command assigned it the catalogue number 05643.

Kosmos 461 was the only DS-U2-MT satellite to be launched. It was operated in an orbit with a perigee of 486 kilometres (302 mi), an apogee of 508 kilometres (316 mi), 69.2 degrees of inclination, and an orbital period of 94.55 minutes. It completed operations on 14 December 1972, before decaying from orbit and reentering the atmosphere on 21 February 1979.

== See also ==
- 1971 in spaceflight
