= Kosmos 391 =

Soviet radar target satellite

- Mission type: ABM radar target
- COSPAR ID: 1971-002A
- SATCAT no.: 04847

Spacecraft properties
- Spacecraft type: DS-P1-I
- Manufacturer: Yuzhnoye
- Launch mass: 300 kilograms (660 lb)

Start of mission
- Launch date: 14 January 1971, 12:00:00 UTC
- Rocket: Kosmos-2I 63SM
- Launch site: Plesetsk 133/1

End of mission
- Decay date: 21 February 1971

Orbital parameters
- Reference system: Geocentric
- Regime: Low Earth
- Perigee altitude: 267 kilometres (166 mi)
- Apogee altitude: 803 kilometres (499 mi)
- Inclination: 70.9 degrees
- Period: 95.3 minutes

Kosmos 391 (Russian: Космос 391 meaning Cosmos 391), also known as DS-P1-I No.11 was a satellite which was used as a radar target for anti-ballistic missile tests. It was launched by the Soviet Union in 1971 as part of the Dnepropetrovsk Sputnik programme.

== Launch ==
It was launched aboard a Kosmos-2I 63SM rocket, from Site 133/1 at Plesetsk. The launch occurred at 12:00:00 UTC on 14 January 1971.

== Orbit ==
Kosmos 391 was placed into a low Earth orbit with a perigee of 267 kilometres (166 mi), an apogee of 803 kilometres (499 mi), 70.9 degrees of inclination, and an orbital period of 95.3 minutes. It decayed from orbit on 21 February 1971.

Kosmos 391 was the tenth of nineteen DS-P1-I satellites to be launched. Of these, all reached orbit successfully except the seventh.

== See also ==
- 1971 in spaceflight
