= Kosmos 521 =

Soviet target test satellite

- Mission type: ASAT target
- COSPAR ID: 1972-074A
- SATCAT no.: 06206
- Mission duration: 53 years, 12 days (in orbit)

Spacecraft properties
- Spacecraft type: DS-P1-M
- Manufacturer: Yuzhnoye
- Launch mass: 650 kilograms (1,430 lb)

Start of mission
- Launch date: 29 September 1972, 20:18:59 UTC
- Rocket: Kosmos-3M
- Launch site: Plesetsk 132/2

Orbital parameters
- Reference system: Geocentric
- Regime: Low Earth
- Perigee altitude: 987 kilometres (613 mi)
- Apogee altitude: 992 kilometres (616 mi)
- Inclination: 65.8 degrees
- Period: 104.9 minutes

Kosmos 521 (Russian: Космос 521 meaning Cosmos 521), also known as DS-P1-M No.4 is a satellite which was intended for use as a target for tests of anti-satellite weapons. It was launched by the Soviet Union in 1972 as part of the Dnepropetrovsk Sputnik programme, and was to have been used as a target for an IS-A interceptor, as part of the Istrebitel Sputnikov programme. A malfunction aboard the satellite rendered it useless, and the interceptor was not launched.

It was launched aboard a Kosmos-3M carrier rocket, from Site 132/2 at the Plesetsk Cosmodrome. The launch occurred at 20:18:59 UTC on 29 September 1972.

Kosmos 521 was placed into a low Earth orbit with a perigee of 987 kilometres (613 mi), an apogee of 992 kilometres (616 mi), 65.8 degrees of inclination, and an orbital period of 104.9 minutes. No attempt to intercept the satellite was made after its onboard telemetry system malfunctioned. As of 2009, it is still in orbit. Western analysts did not identify Kosmos 521 as being associated with the Soviet ASAT programme until records were declassified.

Kosmos 521 was the last of the five original DS-P1-M satellites to be launched, of which all but the first were successfully reached orbit. Despite its successful launch, the satellite malfunctioned shortly after reaching orbit, and was unusable. Subsequent launches used a modified version of the DS-P1-M, known as Lira.

== See also ==
- 1972 in spaceflight
