= Kosmos 423 =

Soviet radar calibration satellite

- Mission type: ABM radar target
- COSPAR ID: 1971-047A
- SATCAT no.: 05246

Spacecraft properties
- Spacecraft type: DS-P1-Yu
- Manufacturer: Yuzhnoye
- Launch mass: 325 kilograms (717 lb)

Start of mission
- Launch date: 27 May 1971, 11:59:55 UTC
- Rocket: Kosmos-2I 63SM
- Launch site: Plesetsk 133/1

End of mission
- Decay date: 26 November 1971

Orbital parameters
- Reference system: Geocentric
- Regime: Low Earth
- Perigee altitude: 268 kilometres (167 mi)
- Apogee altitude: 462 kilometres (287 mi)
- Inclination: 71 degrees
- Period: 91.8 minutes

Kosmos 423 (Russian: Космос 423 meaning Cosmos 423), known before launch as DS-P1-Yu No.47, was a Soviet satellite which was launched in 1971 as part of the Dnepropetrovsk Sputnik programme. It was a 325-kilogram (717 lb) spacecraft, which was built by the Yuzhnoye Design Bureau, and was used as a radar calibration target for anti-ballistic missile tests.

== Launch ==
Kosmos 423 was successfully launched into low Earth orbit on 27 May 1971, with the rocket lifting off at 11:59:55 UTC. The launch took place from Site 133/1 at the Plesetsk Cosmodrome, and used a Kosmos-2I 63SM carrier rocket.

== Orbit ==
Upon reaching orbit, it was assigned its Kosmos designation, and received the International Designator 1971-047A.

Kosmos 423 was the forty-third of seventy nine DS-P1-Yu satellites to be launched, and the thirty-ninth of seventy two to successfully reach orbit. It was operated in an orbit with a perigee of 268 kilometres (167 mi), an apogee of 462 kilometres (287 mi), 71 degrees of inclination, and an orbital period of 91.8 minutes. It remained in orbit until it decayed and reentered the atmosphere on 26 November 1971.

== See also ==
- 1971 in spaceflight
