= Kosmos 440 =

Soviet radar calibration satellite

- Mission type: ABM radar target
- COSPAR ID: 1971-079A
- SATCAT no.: 05480

Spacecraft properties
- Spacecraft type: DS-P1-I
- Manufacturer: Yuzhnoye
- Launch mass: 300 kilograms (660 lb)

Start of mission
- Launch date: 24 September 1971, 10:30:00 UTC
- Rocket: Kosmos-2I 63SM
- Launch site: Plesetsk 133/1

End of mission
- Decay date: 29 October 1972

Orbital parameters
- Reference system: Geocentric
- Regime: Low Earth
- Perigee altitude: 272 kilometres (169 mi)
- Apogee altitude: 788 kilometres (490 mi)
- Inclination: 70.9 degrees
- Period: 95.2 minutes

Kosmos 440 (Russian: Космос 440 meaning Cosmos 440), also known as DS-P1-I No.10 was a satellite which was used as a radar target for anti-ballistic missile tests. It was launched by the Soviet Union in 1971 as part of the Dnepropetrovsk Sputnik programme.

== Launch ==
It was launched aboard a Kosmos-2I 63SM rocket, from Site 133/1 at Plesetsk. The launch occurred at 10:30:00 UTC on 24 September 1971.

== Orbit ==
Kosmos 440 was placed into a low Earth orbit with a perigee of 272 kilometres (169 mi), an apogee of 788 kilometres (490 mi), 70.9 degrees of inclination, and an orbital period of 95.2 minutes. It decayed from orbit on 29 October 1972.

Kosmos 440 was the eleventh of nineteen DS-P1-I satellites to be launched. Of these, all reached orbit successfully except the seventh.

== See also ==
- 1971 in spaceflight
