= Kosmos 393 =

Soviet radar calibration satellite

- Mission type: ABM radar target
- COSPAR ID: 1971-007A
- SATCAT no.: 04884

Spacecraft properties
- Spacecraft type: DS-P1-Yu
- Manufacturer: Yuzhnoye
- Launch mass: 325 kilograms (717 lb)

Start of mission
- Launch date: 26 January 1971, 12:44:33 UTC
- Rocket: Kosmos-2I 63SM
- Launch site: Plesetsk 133/1

End of mission
- Decay date: 16 June 1971

Orbital parameters
- Reference system: Geocentric
- Regime: Low Earth
- Perigee altitude: 263 kilometres (163 mi)
- Apogee altitude: 451 kilometres (280 mi)
- Inclination: 71 degrees
- Period: 91.7 minutes

Kosmos 393 (Russian: Космос 393 meaning Cosmos 393), known before launch as DS-P1-Yu No.34, was a Soviet satellite which was launched in 1971 as part of the Dnepropetrovsk Sputnik programme. It was a 325-kilogram (717 lb) spacecraft, which was built by the Yuzhnoye Design Bureau, and was used as a radar calibration target for anti-ballistic missile tests.

== Launch ==
Kosmos 393 was successfully launched into low Earth orbit on 26 January 1971, with the rocket lifting off at 12:44:33 UTC. The launch took place from Site 133/1 at the Plesetsk Cosmodrome, and used a Kosmos-2I 63SM carrier rocket.

== Orbit ==
Upon reaching orbit, it was assigned its Kosmos designation, and received the International Designator 1971-007A.

Kosmos 393 was the thirty-ninth of seventy nine DS-P1-Yu satellites to be launched, and the thirty-sixth of seventy two to successfully reach orbit. It was operated in an orbit with a perigee of 263 kilometres (163 mi), an apogee of 451 kilometres (280 mi), 71 degrees of inclination, and an orbital period of 91.7 minutes. It remained in orbit until it decayed and reentered the atmosphere on 16 June 1971.

== See also ==
- 1971 in spaceflight
