= Kosmos 426 =

Soviet earth magnetosphere studying satellite

- Mission type: Magnetospheric
- COSPAR ID: 1971-052A
- SATCAT no.: 05281

Spacecraft properties
- Spacecraft type: DS-U2-K
- Manufacturer: Yuzhnoye
- Launch mass: 680 kilograms (1,500 lb)

Start of mission
- Launch date: 4 June 1971, 18:10:00 UTC
- Rocket: Kosmos-3M
- Launch site: Plesetsk 132/2

End of mission
- Decay date: 11 May 2002

Orbital parameters
- Reference system: Geocentric
- Regime: Low Earth
- Perigee altitude: 388 kilometres (241 mi)
- Apogee altitude: 1,993 kilometres (1,238 mi)
- Inclination: 74 degrees
- Period: 109.2 minutes

Kosmos 426 (Russian: Космос 426 meaning Cosmos 426), also known as DS-U2-K No.1, was a Soviet satellite which was launched in 1971 as part of the Dnepropetrovsk Sputnik programme. It was a 680-kilogram (1,500 lb) spacecraft, which was built by the Yuzhnoye Design Bureau, and was used to study charged particles and radiation in the Earth's magnetosphere.

== Launch ==
A Kosmos-3M carrier rocket, with serial number 65014-101, was used to launch Kosmos 426 into low Earth orbit. The launch took place from Site 132/2 at the Plesetsk Cosmodrome. The launch occurred at 18:10:00 UTC on 4 June 1971, and resulted in the successful insertion of the satellite into orbit.

== Orbit ==
Upon reaching orbit, the satellite was assigned its Kosmos designation, and received the International Designator 1971-052A. The North American Aerospace Defense Command assigned it the catalogue number 05281.

Kosmos 426 was the only DS-U2-K satellite to be launched. It was operated in an orbit with a perigee of 388 kilometres (241 mi), an apogee of 1,993 kilometres (1,238 mi), 74 degrees of inclination, and an orbital period of 109.2 minutes. It was operated until 12 January 1972, and subsequently remained in orbit until it decayed and reentered the atmosphere on 11 May 2002.

== See also ==
- 1971 in spaceflight
