= Kosmos 458 =

Soviet radar calibration satellite

- Mission type: ABM radar target
- COSPAR ID: 1971-101A
- SATCAT no.: 05623

Spacecraft properties
- Spacecraft type: DS-P1-Yu
- Manufacturer: Yuzhnoye
- Launch mass: 325 kilograms (717 lb)

Start of mission
- Launch date: 29 November 1971, 10:09:56 UTC
- Rocket: Kosmos-2I 63SM
- Launch site: Plesetsk 133/1

End of mission
- Decay date: 20 April 1972

Orbital parameters
- Reference system: Geocentric
- Regime: Low Earth
- Perigee altitude: 266 kilometres (165 mi)
- Apogee altitude: 473 kilometres (294 mi)
- Inclination: 70.9 degrees
- Period: 91.9 minutes

Kosmos 458 (Russian: Космос 458 meaning Cosmos 458), known before launch as DS-P1-Yu No.53, was a Soviet satellite which was launched in 1971 as part of the Dnepropetrovsk Sputnik programme. It was a 325-kilogram (717 lb) spacecraft, which was built by the Yuzhnoye Design Bureau, and was used as a radar calibration target for anti-ballistic missile tests.

== Launch ==
Kosmos 458 was successfully launched into low Earth orbit on 29 November 1971, with the rocket lifting off at 10:09:56 UTC. The launch took place from Site 133/1 at the Plesetsk Cosmodrome, and used a Kosmos-2I 63SM carrier rocket.

== Orbit ==
Upon reaching orbit, it was assigned its Kosmos designation, and received the International Designator 1971-101A. The North American Aerospace Defense Command assigned it the catalogue number 05623.

Kosmos 458 was the forty-eighth of seventy nine DS-P1-Yu satellites to be launched, and the forty-third of seventy two to successfully reach orbit. It was operated in an orbit with a perigee of 266 kilometres (165 mi), an apogee of 473 kilometres (294 mi), 70.9 degrees of inclination, and an orbital period of 91.9 minutes. It remained in orbit until it decayed and reentered the atmosphere on 20 April 1972.

== See also ==
- 1971 in spaceflight
