= Kosmos 408 =

Soviet radar calibration satellite

- Mission type: ABM radar target
- COSPAR ID: 1971-037A
- SATCAT no.: 05177

Spacecraft properties
- Spacecraft type: DS-P1-Yu
- Manufacturer: Yuzhnoye
- Launch mass: 250 kilograms (550 lb)

Start of mission
- Launch date: 24 April 1971, 11:15:02 UTC
- Rocket: Kosmos-2I 63SM
- Launch site: Plesetsk 133/1

End of mission
- Decay date: 29 December 1971

Orbital parameters
- Reference system: Geocentric
- Regime: Low Earth
- Perigee altitude: 197 kilometres (122 mi)
- Apogee altitude: 1,383 kilometres (859 mi)
- Inclination: 81.8 degrees
- Period: 100.66 minutes

Kosmos 408 (Russian: Космос 408 meaning Cosmos 408), known before launch as DS-P1-Yu No.37, was a Soviet satellite which was launched in 1971 as part of the Dnepropetrovsk Sputnik programme. It was a 250-kilogram (550 lb) spacecraft, which was built by the Yuzhnoye Design Bureau, and was used as a radar calibration target for anti-ballistic missile tests.

== Launch ==
Kosmos 408 was successfully launched into low Earth orbit on 24 April 1971, with the rocket lifting off at 11:15:02 UTC. The launch took place from Site 133/1 at the Plesetsk Cosmodrome, and used a Kosmos-2I 63SM carrier rocket.

== Orbit ==
Upon reaching orbit, it was assigned its Kosmos designation, and received the International Designator 1971-037A.

Kosmos 408 was the forty-first of seventy nine DS-P1-Yu satellites to be launched, and the thirty-seventh of seventy two to successfully reach orbit. It was operated in an orbit with a perigee of 197 kilometres (122 mi), an apogee of 1,383 kilometres (859 mi), 81.8 degrees of inclination, and an orbital period of 100.66 minutes. It remained in orbit until it decayed and reentered the atmosphere on 29 December 1971.

== See also ==
- 1971 in spaceflight
