= Kosmos 396 =

Soviet photographic reconnaissance satellite

- Mission type: Reconnaissance
- COSPAR ID: 1971-014A
- SATCAT no.: 4959
- Mission duration: ~13 days
- Orbits completed: ~210

Spacecraft properties
- Spacecraft type: Zenit-4M
- Manufacturer: OKB-1
- Launch mass: 6,300 kilograms (13,900 lb)

Start of mission
- Launch date: 18 February 1971, 13:59 UTC
- Rocket: Voskhod 11A57
- Launch site: Plesetsk 43/3

End of mission
- Landing date: 3 March 1971

Orbital parameters
- Reference system: Geocentric
- Regime: Low Earth
- Eccentricity: 0.00738
- Perigee altitude: 212 kilometres (132 mi)
- Apogee altitude: 310 kilometres (190 mi)
- Inclination: 65.4 degrees
- Period: 89.4 minutes
- Epoch: 17 February 1971, 19:00:00 UTC

Kosmos 396 (Russian: Космос 396 meaning Cosmos 396) was a test flight of the Zenit-4M military surveillance satellite. The Zenit satellite's purpose was high resolution photographic reconnaissance. This particular test flight returned a capsule containing exposed film.

== See also ==
- 1971 in spaceflight
