= EOLE (satellite) =

French weather satellite

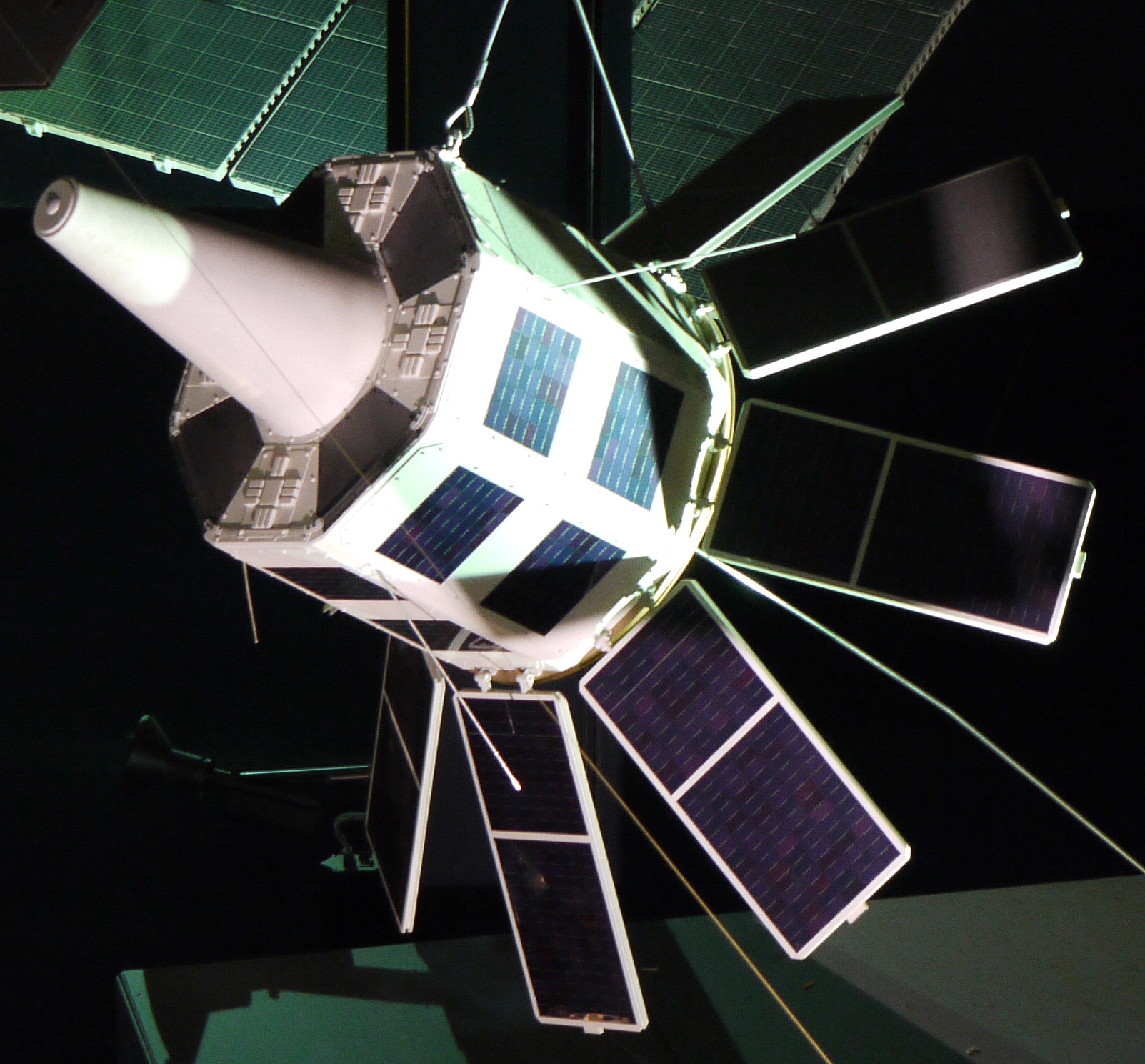
- Image of EOLE
- Mission type: Weather satellite
- Operator: CNES
- COSPAR ID: 1971-071A

Spacecraft properties
- Manufacturer: Centre Nationale d’Etudes Spatiales
- Launch mass: 84.7 kg (187 lb)

Start of mission
- Launch date: 16 Aug 1971, 18:39 UTC
- Rocket: Scout B-1
- Launch site: Wallops Flight Facility Launch Area 3

Orbital parameters
- Reference system: Geocentric
- Regime: Low Earth
- Eccentricity: 0.01596
- Perigee altitude: 677 km (421 mi)
- Apogee altitude: 906 km (563 mi)
- Inclination: 50°
- Period: 100.70 minutes
- Epoch: 16 Aug 1971

EOLE, also known as EOLE-1, CAS-A and FR-2 , was a French weather satellite launched 16 Aug 1971 for the study of air mass movement in the Southern Hemisphere. Using a network of hundreds of free-floating balloons launched from South America, EOLE monitored weather patterns for a year and half, until the last balloon was shut down in January 1973. The spacecraft was subsequently used to track and receive data from ocean buoys, icebergs, and ships. More than a meteorology satellite, the project's larger goal was to demonstrate a new technique for the collection of dispersed data collection.

== Background ==
On May 27, 1966, NASA and the French Centre Nationale d’Etudes Spatiales (CNES) signed a memorandum of understanding for the cooperative meteorological projected called "Eole". The Eole project would gather data on atmospheric circulation using a network of balloons drifting with the wind over the Earth at constant altitudes, acting as tracers of air masses. Pressure and temperature data telemetered from these balloons would be collected by an Earth-orbiting satellite and subsequently transmitted to ground stations. While CNES would be responsible for the development and launching of the balloons and their payloads and for the design, fabrication and testing of the proposed satellite, NASA would provide a Scout rocket and handle launching.

EOLE was developed as part of the Global Atmospheric Research Program (GARP), itself a component of the World Weather Program. GARP's goal was a comprehensive, one-year observation of Earth's atmosphere. Without satellite assistance, balloons could only provide data for 10-20% of the total atmosphere (i.e. within sight of a terrestrial receiver), and the quality of the data was low. By using a satellite to monitor free-floating balloon transmissions, atmospheric data could be gathered in real-time throughout the globe, and with precise positioning of the balloons. Moreover, balloons operating at around 39,000 ft (12,000 m) were quite long-lived, with lifespans up to a year.

== Spacecraft design ==
Schematic of EOLE satellite

EOLE was octagonally shaped and measured 0.71 m (2 ft 4 in) across opposite corners, 0.58 m (1 ft 11 in) long. Eight rectangular solar panels and 15 rechargeable silver-cadmium batteries provided 20 watts of electrical power. The panels were designed to deploy 45 degrees from satellite's upper octagonal structure after orbital insertion. The spacecraft did not employ spin stabilization; instead, a deployable 10.06 m (33.0 ft) gravity gradient boom kept the satellite consistently oriented with respect to the Earth, stable within 9 deg of local vertical.

The onboard telemetry consisted of (1) a 136.350-MHz downlink transmitter for relaying balloon telemetry to ground stations and also to serve as a tracking beacon, (2) a 148.25-MHz receiver for receiving spacecraft commands and telemetry programs for balloon operations, and (3) a spacecraft-to-balloon transmitter (464.84 MHz) and receiver (401.7196 MHz). Received data were stored on board the spacecraft and unloaded on command when the spacecraft was within range of the ground station.

Schematic of EOLE in orbit receiving and transmitting balloon telemetry

=== Balloons ===
EOLE's primary experiment was its "upper atmospheric winds and weather data relay system", which collected meteorological data from balloons in the Southern Hemisphere floating at pressure altitudes of about 200 millibars (about 20% of sea level) and developed techniques for accurately determining balloon positions from an orbiting spacecraft.

The satellite carried a modified Doppler system on board, which, when combined with satellite-acquired range measurements, could locate a balloon's horizontal position to within plus or minus 3 km. As many as 500 3.66 m (12.0 ft), helium-filled, 30-day-lifetime constant density balloons were launched at the rate of three per day from three sites in Argentina, with an additional 250 held in reserve to replace those that failed. Each balloon had a frangible 9.75 m (32.0 ft) instrumentation line carrying temperature and pressure sensors, solar cells and batteries for power supplies, a telemetry receiver operating at 464.4864 MHz, and a 4-W, 401.71796-MHz transmitter using a linear sleeve antenna. The spacecraft interrogated the balloons both day and night, individually, in sequence, or in a programmed group (up to 64 at a time). The balloon position and sensor data were relayed to the ground and were fed into a computer program that provided, for operational use, wind speed and direction, ambient temperature, ambient pressure, and balloon superpressure. Each balloon was also equipped with an explosive charge for self-destruction, which could be triggered by ground command if the balloon drifted beyond the experiment's latitudinal limits (30 deg S to 60 deg S).

Schematic of EOLE satellite weather balloon

== Mission and results ==
EOLE was launched via Scout B-1 from Wallops Flight Facility Launch Area 3 on 16 Aug 1971 at 18:39 UTC. Stabilization took place on 19-20 August, a delicate operation involving the remote controlled extension of the stabilization mast, which resulted in the satellite's antenna being properly aimed at Earth. NASA handled initial tracking and data acquisition, CNES taking over responsibility for these activities as well as data processing. Data was analyzed simultaneously by CNES and by the Eole Data Interpretation Group comprising representatives of NASA, CNES, NCAR, NOAA, and UCLA. Starting 21 August and continuing through 29 November, at least three balloons were released per day from each of three stations in Argentina: Mendoza, Neuquén, and Lago Fagnano, the maximum number launched in one day being 13.

Air currents mapped by the EOLE balloon network

The satellite operation was successful with the exception of the inadvertent destruction of 72 balloons (of 115 balloons then in operation) in two separate groups (the first near Africa, the other near Australia) on September 11, 1971 when ground personnel inadvertently sent a general destruct command instead of the interrogation command. Despite this, between 6 November and 2 December, the number of active balloons exceeded 250, the minimum number needed for a successful experiment. The maximum number was achieved 13 November 1971, with 280 balloons operational.

1.2-1.3 balloons were lost per day, due to icing, leakage, etc. As of 8 February 1972, 479 balloons had been launched, of which 312 had died, 130 were still active, and the status of 37 was in doubt (not transmitting, but not yet declared dead). The last balloons were intentionally destroyed in January 1973. EOLE was subsequently used for tracking and collecting data from ocean buoys, icebergs, and ships. For example, EOLE tracked a spar buoy in the Agulhas current system from 16 July to 12 October 1973 (89 days), mapping currents and eddies. This extended work was in service of the project's larger goal: developing techniques for the collection of dispersed data.

== Legacy and status ==
As of 30 September 2026, EOLE is still in orbit, and its location can be tracked.
