= Istrebitel Sputnikov =

Soviet anti-satellite weapon program

Istrebitel Sputnikov, or IS (Russian: Истребитель спутников, ИС, meaning "destroyer of satellites"), was a Soviet anti-satellite weapons programme which led to the deployment of the IS-A or I2P system during the 1970s and 1980s. IS satellites were originally intended to launch on UR-200 rockets, but following the cancellation of the UR-200, the Polyot, Tsyklon-2A and Tsyklon-2 rockets were used instead.

== History ==
The first test flights of the IS spacecraft used the I1P configuration, and served to demonstrate the propulsion and control systems of the spacecraft. Both were launched by Polyot rockets, and were designated Polyot 1 and Polyot 2. They were launched on 1 November 1963 and 12 April 1964 respectively. Following this, IS-A or I2P interceptors and IS-P or I2M targets were launched. Only four IS-P targets were launched before the type was replaced by the cheaper DS-P1-M satellite, launched as part of the Dnepropetrovsk Sputnik programme. Later IS-A tests intercepted DS-P1-M satellites, or the Lira satellites that succeeded them.

== Kosmos 248 intercept ==
In November 1968, 4 years after Polyot 1 and 2 were tested for a potential Satellite intercept, Kosmos 248 was successfully destroyed by Kosmos 252 which came within the 5km 'kill radius' and destroyed Kosmos 248 by detonating its warhead.

== See also ==
- Kosmos 2499
