= Dnepropetrovsk Sputnik =

Series of Soviet satellites

Dnepropetrovsk Sputnik (Russian: Днепропетровский Спутник; Ukrainian: Дніпропетровський супутник), also known as DS, was a series of satellites launched by the Soviet Union between 1961 and 1982. DS satellites were used for a number of missions, including technological and scientific research, and radar tracking targets for anti-satellite weapons and anti-ballistic missiles. 185 were launched, using dedicated Kosmos rockets.

== History ==
The first DS satellite, DS-1 No.1, was launched on the maiden flight of the Kosmos-2I 63S1 rocket on 27 October 1961. It failed to reach orbit after an acceleration integrator malfunctioned.

A second launch attempt, with DS-1 No.2, failed due to a second stage malfunction.

The third satellite, as DS-2, was launched on 16 March 1962, successfully reached orbit, and was subsequently assigned the designation Kosmos 1, becoming the first satellite to be designated under the Kosmos system. Kosmos designations were assigned to all DS satellites, except those that failed to reach orbit, and a small number which was launched as part of the Interkosmos and Oryol programmes.

The last DS satellite, Kosmos 1375, was launched aboard a Kosmos-3M on 6 June 1982. It was a Lira ASAT target, a derivative of the DS-P1-M.
