= 1965 in spaceflight (October–December) =

This is a list of spaceflights launched between October and December 1965. For launches in the rest of the year, see 1965 in spaceflight (January–March), 1965 in spaceflight (April–June) and 1965 in spaceflight (July–September). For an overview of the whole year, see 1965 in spaceflight.

== Orbital launches ==
- ← Jan
- Feb
- Mar
- Apr
- May
- Jun
- Jul
- Aug
- Sep
- Oct
- Nov
- Dec →

Date and time (UTC)	Rocket	Flight number	Launch site		LSP	
Date and time (UTC)	Payload (⚀ = CubeSat)	Operator	Orbit	Function	Decay (UTC)	Outcome
Date and time (UTC)	Remarks					
=== October ===
4 October; 07:56:40	(Soviet Union) Molniya		(Soviet Union) Baikonur Site 1/5		(Soviet Union)	
4 October; 07:56:40	(Soviet Union) Luna 7 (Ye-6 №11)		Highly elliptical	Lunar lander	7 October; 22:08	Spacecraft failure
4 October; 07:56:40	Retrorockets fired too early, spacecraft crashed on landing.					
5 October; 09:07:08	(United States) Atlas D		(United States) Vandenberg LC-576B-3		(United States) US Air Force	
5 October; 09:07:08	(United States) Pod 29	AFCRL/NRL	Suborbital	Ionospheric/Aeronomy	5 October	Successful
5 October; 09:07:08	(United States) OV1-2	US Air Force	Medium Earth	Radiation	In orbit	Successful
5 October; 17:45:57	(United States) Thrust Augmented Thor SLV-2A Agena-D		(United States) Vandenberg LC-75-3-5		(United States) US Air Force	
5 October; 17:45:57	(United States) OPS 5325 (KH-4A 25/1025)	US Air Force/NRO	Low Earth	Optical imaging	29 October	Successful
5 October; 17:45:57	(United States) SRV 636	US Air Force/NRO	Low Earth	Film return	October	Successful
5 October; 17:45:57	(United States) SRV 650	US Air Force/NRO	Low Earth	Film return	October	Successful
14 October; 6:00	(Soviet Union) Molniya		(Soviet Union) Baikonur Site 1/5		(Soviet Union)	
14 October; 6:00	(Soviet Union) Molniya 1-02 (Molniya-1 4L)		Molniya	Communications	17 March 1967	Successful
14 October; 13:11:55	(United States) Thrust Augmented Thor SLV-2A Agena-D		(United States) Vandenberg LC-75-1-1		(United States) US Air Force	
14 October; 13:11:55	(United States) OGO-2 (OGO-C/S-50)	NASA	Low Earth	Ionospheric; Magnetospheric	17 September 1981	Partial spacecraft failure
14 October; 13:11:55	Control problems led to propellent depletion within nine days of launch, partially operational until 1 November 1967, and then briefly reactivated in February 1968.					
15 October; 17:23:59	(United States) Titan IIIC		(United States) Cape Canaveral LC-40		(United States) US Air Force	
15 October; 17:23:59	(United States) OV2-1	US Air Force	Low Earth	Technology	27 July 1972	Launch failure
15 October; 17:23:59	(United States) LCS-2	Lincoln	Low Earth	Radar calibration	27 July 1972	Launch failure
15 October; 17:23:59	Upper stage disintegrated, payloads remained attached.					
16 October; 08:09	(Soviet Union) Voskhod		(Soviet Union) Baikonur Site 31/6		(Soviet Union)	
16 October; 08:09	(Soviet Union) Kosmos 92 (Zenit-4 №13)		Low Earth	Optical imaging	24 October	Successful
19 October; 05:44	(Soviet Union) Kosmos-2M		(Soviet Union) Kapustin Yar Site 86/1		(Soviet Union)	
19 October; 05:44	(Soviet Union) Kosmos 93 (DS-U2-V №1)		Low Earth	Technology	3 January 1966	Successful
19 October; 05:44	Maiden flight of Kosmos-2M.					
25 October; 15:00	(United States) Atlas SLV-3 Agena-D		(United States) Cape Canaveral LC-14		(United States) US Air Force	
25 October; 15:00	(United States) GATV 5002	US Air Force	Intended: Low Earth	Docking target	+375 seconds	Launch failure
25 October; 15:00	Agena exploded 375 seconds after launch.					
28 October; 08:24	(Soviet Union) Voskhod		(Soviet Union) Baikonur Site 31/6		(Soviet Union)	
28 October; 08:24	(Soviet Union) Kosmos 94 (Zenit-4 №14)		Low Earth	Optical imaging	5 November	Successful
28 October; 21:17:12	(United States) Thrust Augmented Thor SLV-2A Agena-D		(United States) Vandenberg PALC-1-1		(United States) US Air Force	
28 October; 21:17:12	(United States) OPS 2155 (KH-4A 26/1026)	US Air Force/NRO	Low Earth	Optical imaging	17 November	Successful
28 October; 21:17:12	(United States) SRV 701	US Air Force/NRO	Low Earth	Film return	October/November	Successful
28 October; 21:17:12	(United States) SRV 702	US Air Force/NRO	Low Earth	Film return	November	Successful
← Jan; Feb; Mar; Apr; May; Jun; Jul; Aug; Sep; Oct; Nov; Dec →; === November ===
2 November; 12:27:59	(Soviet Union) UR-500 (Proton)		(Soviet Union) Baikonur Site 81/23		(Soviet Union)	
2 November; 12:27:59	(Soviet Union) Proton 2 (N-4 №2)		Low Earth	Physics	6 February 1966	Successful
4 November; 05:31	(Soviet Union) Kosmos-2M		(Soviet Union) Kapustin Yar Site 86/1		(Soviet Union)	
4 November; 05:31	(Soviet Union) Kosmos 95 (DS-U2-V №2)		Low Earth	Technology	18 January 1966	Successful
6 November; 18:38:42	(United States) Delta E	D-34	(United States) Cape Canaveral LC-17A		(United States) NASA	
6 November; 18:38:42	(United States) Explorer 29 (GEOS-1/GEOS-A)	NASA	Medium Earth	Geodesy	In orbit	Successful
6 November; 18:38:42	Ceased operations on 17 December 1967, Maiden flight of Delta E.					
8 November; 19:26	(United States) Atlas SLV-3 Agena-D		(United States) Vandenberg PALC-2-4		(United States) US Air Force	
8 November; 19:26	(United States) OPS 6232 (KH-7 23/AFP-206)	US Air Force/NRO	Low Earth	Optical imaging	11 November	Successful
8 November; 19:26	(United States) OPS 8293 (AURORAL)	US Air Force/NRO	Low Earth		9 November	Successful
12 November; 05:02	(Soviet Union) Molniya (M)		(Soviet Union) Baikonur Site 31/6		(Soviet Union)	
12 November; 05:02	(Soviet Union) Venera 2 (3MV-4 №3)		Heliocentric	Venus flyby	In orbit	Spacecraft failure
12 November; 05:02	Overheated during flyby and failed to reestablish communications with Earth afterwards.					
16 November; 14:19	(Soviet Union) Molniya (M)		(Soviet Union) Baikonur Site 31/6		(Soviet Union)	
16 November; 14:19	(Soviet Union) Venera 3 (3MV-3 №1)		Heliocentric	Venus lander	1 March 1966	Spacecraft failure
16 November; 14:19	Overheated shortly before entering the atmosphere of Venus, resulting in the failure of the spacecraft's communications system. Spacecraft landed, becoming the first man-made object to reach the surface of another planet, but did not return any data.					
19 November; 04:48:27	(United States) Scout X-4		(United States) Wallops Island LA-3A		(United States) NASA	
19 November; 04:48:27	(United States) Explorer 30 (Solrad 8/SR-8/SE-A)	NASA/NRL	Low Earth	Solar	20 November 1967	Successful
23 November; 03:21	(Soviet Union) Molniya (M)		(Soviet Union) Baikonur Site 31/6		(Soviet Union)	
23 November; 03:21	(Soviet Union) Kosmos 96 (Venera 3MV-4 №4)		Intended: Heliocentric; Achieved: Low Earth	Venus flyby	9 December	Launch failure
23 November; 03:21	Block I engine exploded following fuel line rupture.					
26 November; 12:14	(Soviet Union) Kosmos-2M		(Soviet Union) Kapustin Yar Site 86/1		(Soviet Union)	
26 November; 12:14	(Soviet Union) Kosmos 97 (DS-U2-M №1)		Low Earth	Technology	2 April 1967	Successful
26 November	(France) Diamant A		(Algeria) Hammaguir Brigitte/A		(France)	
26 November	(France) Astérix (A-1)	CNES	Low Earth	Technology demonstration	28 November	Successful
27 November; 08:24	(Soviet Union) Vostok-2		(Soviet Union) Baikonur Site 31/6		(Soviet Union)	
27 November; 08:24	(Soviet Union) Kosmos 98 (Zenit-2 №31)		Low Earth	Optical imaging	5 December	Successful
29 November; 04:48:47	(United States) Thor SLV-2 Agena-B		(United States) Vandenberg LC-75-1-1		(United States) US Air Force	
29 November; 04:48:47	(Canada) Alouette 2	DRTE	Medium Earth	Ionospheric	In orbit	Successful
29 November; 04:48:47	(United States) Explorer 31 (DME-A/ISIS-X)	NASA	Medium Earth	Ionospheric	In orbit	Successful
29 November; 04:48:47	Final flight of Thor SLV-2 Agena-B, Alouette 2 ceased operations on 29 November 1975, Explorer stopped responding to ground commands on 15 January 1971.					
← Jan; Feb; Mar; Apr; May; Jun; Jul; Aug; Sep; Oct; Nov; Dec →; === December ===
3 December; 10:46:14	(Soviet Union) Molniya		(Soviet Union) Baikonur Site 31/6		(Soviet Union)	
3 December; 10:46:14	(Soviet Union) Luna 8 (Ye-6 №12)		Highly elliptical	Lunar lander	6 December; 21:51:30	Spacecraft failure
3 December; 10:46:14	Retrorockets fired too late, spacecraft crashed on landing. Final flight of Molniya (8K78) rocket.					
4 December; 19:30:04	(United States) Titan II GLV		(United States) Cape Canaveral LC-19		(United States) US Air Force	
4 December; 19:30:04	(United States) Gemini VII	NASA	Low Earth	Technology/Biological/Target	18 December; 14:05:04	Successful
4 December; 19:30:04	Carried two astronauts, set endurance record for crewed spaceflight, used as a rendezvous target by Gemini VIA, first rendezvous between two spacecraft in orbit.					
6 December; 21:05:47	(United States) Scout X-4		(United States) Vandenberg PALC-D		(United States) US Air Force	
6 December; 21:05:47	(France) FR-1	CNES	Low Earth	Ionospheric	In orbit	Successful
6 December; 21:05:47	Final flight of Scout X-4.					
9 December; 21:10:19	(United States) Thrust Augmented Thor SLV-2A Agena-D		(United States) Vandenberg LC-75-3-5		(United States) US Air Force	
9 December; 21:10:19	(United States) OPS 7249 (KH-4A 27/1027)	US Air Force/NRO	Low Earth	Optical imaging	26 December	Partial spacecraft failure
9 December; 21:10:19	(United States) SRV 648	US Air Force/NRO	Low Earth	Film return	12 December	Successful
9 December; 21:10:19	(United States) SRV 655	US Air Force/NRO	Low Earth	Film return	26 December	Successful
9 December; 21:10:19	Ceased operations after two days due to attitude control problems.					
10 December; 08:09	(Soviet Union) Vostok-2		(Soviet Union) Baikonur Site 31/6		(Soviet Union)	
10 December; 08:09	(Soviet Union) Kosmos 99 (Zenit-2 №32)		Low Earth	Optical imaging	18 December	Successful
15 December; 13:37:25	(United States) Titan II GLV		(United States) Cape Canaveral LC-19		(United States) US Air Force	
15 December; 13:37:25	(United States) Gemini VIA	NASA	Low Earth	Technology	16 December; 15:28:50	Successful
15 December; 13:37:25	Carried two astronauts, rendezvoused with Gemini VII, first rendezvous between two spacecraft in orbit.					
16 December; 07:31:21	(United States) Delta E	D-35	(United States) Cape Canaveral LC-17A		(United States) NASA	
16 December; 07:31:21	(United States) Pioneer 6 (Pioneer A)	NASA	Heliocentric	Scientific	In orbit	Successful
16 December; 07:31:21	Ceased operations but still online at time of most recent attempt to contact it in December 2000, oldest spacecraft known to be active.					
17 December; 02:24	(Soviet Union) Vostok-2M		(Soviet Union) Baikonur Site 31/6		(Soviet Union) RVSN	
17 December; 02:24	(Soviet Union) Kosmos 100 (Meteor №3)		Low Earth	Weather	15 February 2002	Successful
17 December; 02:24	100th Satellite Launch under Kosmos designation.					
21 December; 06:14	(Soviet Union) Kosmos 63S1		(Soviet Union) Kapustin Yar Site 86/1		(Soviet Union)	
21 December; 06:14	(Soviet Union) Kosmos 101 (DS-P1-Yu №4)		Low Earth	Radar calibration	12 July 1966	Successful
21 December; 14:00:01	(United States) Titan IIIC		(United States) Cape Canaveral LC-41		(United States) US Air Force	
21 December; 14:00:01	(United States) OV2-3	US Air Force	Intended: Geosynchronous; Achieved: Transfer	Technology	17 August 1975	Launch failure
21 December; 14:00:01	(United States) LES-3	Lincoln	Intended: Geosynchronous; Achieved: Transfer	Technology	6 April 1968	Partial launch failure
21 December; 14:00:01	(United States) LES-4	Lincoln	Intended: Geosynchronous; Achieved: Transfer	Technology	1 August 1977	Partial launch failure
21 December; 14:00:01	(United States) OSCAR 4		Intended: Geosynchronous; Achieved: Transfer	Amateur radio	12 April 1976	Partial launch failure
21 December; 14:00:01	Third burn of the Transtage failed, and payloads failed to achieve geosynchronous orbit. OV2-3 failed to separate from the Transtage.					
22 December; 04:33:04	(United States) Scout A		(United States) Vandenberg PALC-D		(United States) US Air Force	
22 December; 04:33:04	(United States) OPS 1509 (Transit O-6/NNS 30060)	US Navy	Low Earth	Navigation	In orbit	Partial spacecraft failure
22 December; 04:33:04	Maiden flight of Scout A, satellite failed within eleven months of launch due to poor construction					
24 December; 21:06:15	(United States) Thrust Augmented Thor SLV-2A Agena-D		(United States) Vandenberg LC-75-3-4		(United States) US Air Force	
24 December; 21:06:15	(United States) OPS 4639 (KH-4A 28/1028)	US Air Force/NRO	Low Earth	Optical imaging	20 January 1966	Successful
24 December; 21:06:15	(United States) SRV 703	US Air Force/NRO	Low Earth	Film return	December	Successful
24 December; 21:06:15	(United States) SRV 704	US Air Force/NRO	Low Earth	Film return	December/January 1966	Successful
27 December; 22:19	(Soviet Union) Soyuz/Vostok		(Soviet Union) Baikonur Site 31/6		(Soviet Union)	
27 December; 22:19	(Soviet Union) Kosmos 102 (US-AO №1 s/n 110)		Low Earth	Prototype of US-A satellite	13 January 1966	Successful
27 December; 22:19	Prototype satellite, Maiden flight of Soyuz/Vostok.					
28 December; 08:10	(Soviet Union) Kosmos 63S1		(Soviet Union) Kapustin Yar Site 86/1		(Soviet Union)	
28 December; 08:10	(Soviet Union) DS-K-40 №1		Intended: Low Earth	Technology	28 December	Launch failure
28 December; 08:10	First stage malfunctioned, failed to achieve orbit.					
28 December; 12:30	(Soviet Union) Kosmos-1		(Soviet Union) Baikonur Site 41/15		(Soviet Union)	
28 December; 12:30	(Soviet Union) Kosmos 103 (Strela-2 №1)		Low Earth	Communication	2 January 1990	Successful
28 December; 12:30	Final flight of Kosmos-1.					
← Jan; Feb; Mar; Apr; May; Jun; Jul; Aug; Sep; Oct; Nov; Dec →

== Suborbital launches ==
- ← Jan
- Feb
- Mar
- Apr
- May
- Jun
- Jul
- Aug
- Sep
- Oct
- Nov
- Dec →

Date and time (UTC)	Rocket	Flight number	Launch site		LSP	
Date and time (UTC)	Payload (⚀ = CubeSat)	Operator	Orbit	Function	Decay (UTC)	Outcome
Date and time (UTC)	Remarks					
=== October ===
1 October; 01:30	(United States) Aerobee-150 (Hi)		(United States) White Sands LC-35		(United States) NASA	
1 October; 01:30		NASA	Suborbital	XR astronomy	1 October	Successful
1 October; 01:30	Apogee: 148 kilometres (92 mi)					
1 October; 03:57	(Soviet Union) R-5B Pobeda		(Soviet Union) Kapustin Yar		(Soviet Union) AN	
1 October; 03:57		AN	Suborbital	Ionospheric; Solar	1 October	Successful
1 October; 03:57	Apogee: 480 kilometres (300 mi)					
1 October	(Soviet Union) R-36		(Soviet Union) Baikonur PU-31		(Soviet Union) RVSN	
1 October		RVSN	Suborbital	Missile test	1 October	Successful
1 October	Apogee: 1,000 kilometres (620 mi)					
1 October	(United States) Athena RTV		(United States) Green River Pad 3		(United States) US Air Force	
1 October		US Air Force	Suborbital	REV Test	1 October	Successful
1 October	Apogee: 200 kilometres (120 mi)					
2 October; 00:59:59	(United States) LGM-30F Minuteman II		(United States) Cape Canaveral LC-31B		(United States) US Air Force	
2 October; 00:59:59		US Air Force	Suborbital	Missile test	2 October	Successful
2 October; 00:59:59	Apogee: 1,300 kilometres (810 mi)					
2 October; 04:22	(United Kingdom) Skylark-7C		(Italy) Salto di Quirra		(Europe) ESRO	
2 October; 04:22		UCL/MPE	Suborbital	Aeronomy	2 October	Successful
2 October; 04:22	Apogee: 250 kilometres (160 mi)					
4 October; 03:00	(Japan) Kappa-9M		(Japan) Kagoshima		(Japan) ISAS	
4 October; 03:00		Kyoto	Suborbital	Ionospheric	4 October	Successful
4 October; 03:00	Apogee: 299 kilometres (186 mi)					
5 October; 00:42	(United States) Javelin		(United States) Wallops Island		(United States) NASA	
5 October; 00:42		PSU	Suborbital	Ionospheric	5 October	Successful
5 October; 00:42	Apogee: 960 kilometres (600 mi)					
5 October; 03:00	(United States) Aerobee-150 (Hi)		(United States) White Sands LC-35		(United States) NRL	
5 October; 03:00		NRL	Suborbital	Astronomy	5 October	Successful
5 October; 03:00	Apogee: 171 kilometres (106 mi)					
5 October; 09:27	(United States) HAD		(Australia) Woomera LA-2		(Australia) WRE	
5 October; 09:27		WRE	Suborbital	Aeronomy	5 October	Successful
5 October; 09:27	Apogee: 100 kilometres (62 mi)					
5 October; 23:21	(United States) Nike-Apache		(Canada) Fort Churchill		(United States) NASA	
5 October; 23:21		NASA	Suborbital	Aeronomy	5 October	Successful
5 October; 23:21	Apogee: 206 kilometres (128 mi)					
6 October; 03:00	(United States) Nike-Apache		(Canada) Fort Churchill		(United States) NASA	
6 October; 03:00		NASA	Suborbital	Aeronomy	6 October	Launch failure
6 October; 03:00	Apogee: 2 kilometres (1.2 mi)					
6 October; 04:00	(Japan) Kappa-8L		(Japan) Kagoshima		(Japan) ISAS	
6 October; 04:00		Tokai	Suborbital	Aeronomy	6 October	Successful
6 October; 04:00	Apogee: 141 kilometres (88 mi)					
6 October	(United States) MGM-31 Pershing I		(United States) Gilson Butte		(United States) US Army	
6 October		US Army	Suborbital	Missile test	6 October	Launch failure
6 October	Apogee: 50 kilometres (31 mi)					
6 October	(United States) MGM-31 Pershing I		(United States) Gilson Butte		(United States) US Army	
6 October		US Army	Suborbital	Missile test	6 October	Successful
6 October	Apogee: 250 kilometres (160 mi)					
6 October	(United States) LGM-30F Minuteman II		(United States) Vandenberg LF-22		(United States) US Air Force	
6 October		US Air Force	Suborbital	Missile test	6 October	Successful
6 October	Apogee: 1,300 kilometres (810 mi)					
9 October	(France) Saphir		(Algeria) Hammaguira Brigitte		(France) ONERA	
9 October		ONERA	Suborbital	REV Test	9 October	Successful
9 October	Apogee: 1,150 kilometres (710 mi)					
9 October	(Soviet Union) R-36		(Soviet Union) Baikonur PU-33		(Soviet Union) RVSN	
9 October		RVSN	Suborbital	Missile test	9 October	Successful
9 October	Apogee: 1,000 kilometres (620 mi)					
10 October; 01:25	(United States) Javelin		(United States) Wallops Island		(United States) NASA	
10 October; 01:25		PSU	Suborbital	Ionospheric	10 October	Launch failure
10 October; 01:25	Apogee: 32 kilometres (20 mi)					
11 October	(United States) Athena RTV		(United States) Green River Pad 2		(United States) US Air Force	
11 October		US Air Force	Suborbital	REV Test	11 October	Successful
11 October	Apogee: 200 kilometres (120 mi)					
13 October; 03:13	(United States) Aerobee-150 (Hi)		(United States) White Sands LC-35		(United States) NASA	
13 October; 03:13		Princeton	Suborbital	UV Astronomy	13 October	Successful
13 October; 03:13	Apogee: 183 kilometres (114 mi)					
13 October; 16:01	(United States) Nike-Cajun		(United States) Point Barrow		(United States) NASA	
13 October; 16:01		NASA	Suborbital	Aeronomy	13 October	Successful
13 October; 16:01	Apogee: 100 kilometres (62 mi)					
13 October; 16:11	(United States) Nike-Cajun		(Canada) Fort Churchill		(United States) NASA	
13 October; 16:11		NASA	Suborbital	Aeronomy	13 October	Successful
13 October; 16:11	Apogee: 124 kilometres (77 mi)					
13 October; 16:51	(United States) Nike-Cajun		(United States) Wallops Island		(United States) NASA	
13 October; 16:51		NASA	Suborbital	Aeronomy	13 October	Successful
13 October; 16:51	Apogee: 110 kilometres (68 mi)					
13 October	(United States) MGM-31 Pershing I		(United States) Gilson Butte		(United States) US Army	
13 October		US Army	Suborbital	Missile test	13 October	Launch failure
13 October	Apogee: 10 kilometres (6.2 mi)					
13 October	(Soviet Union) R-5 VAO		(Soviet Union) Kapustin Yar		(Soviet Union) AN	
13 October		AN	Suborbital	Ionospheric	13 October	Successful
13 October	Apogee: 500 kilometres (310 mi)					
15 October	(Soviet Union) R-36		(Soviet Union) Baikonur PU-32		(Soviet Union) RVSN	
15 October		RVSN	Suborbital	Missile test	15 October	Successful
15 October	Apogee: 1,000 kilometres (620 mi)					
15 October	(France) Vesta		(Algeria) Hammaguira Blandine		(France) CNES	
15 October		LRBA	Suborbital	Test flight	15 October	Successful
15 October	Apogee: 150 kilometres (93 mi)					
18 October; 08:30:11	(United States) Nike-Iroquois		(United States) Fort Wainwright		(United States) US Air Force	
18 October; 08:30:11		AFCRL	Suborbital	Aeronomy	18 October	Successful
18 October; 08:30:11	Apogee: 103 kilometres (64 mi)					
18 October; 11:23	(United Kingdom) Skylark-7C		(Australia) Woomera LA-2		(United Kingdom) (Australia) RAE/WRE	
18 October; 11:23		UCL/QUB	Suborbital	Aeronomy	18 October	Successful
18 October; 11:23	Apogee: 205 kilometres (127 mi)					
19 October; 17:30	(United States) Nike-Cajun		(United States) Point Barrow		(United States) NASA	
19 October; 17:30		NASA	Suborbital	Aeronomy	19 October	Successful
19 October; 17:30	Apogee: 100 kilometres (62 mi)					
19 October; 17:30	(United States) Nike-Cajun		(Canada) Fort Churchill		(United States) NASA	
19 October; 17:30		NASA	Suborbital	Aeronomy	19 October	Successful
19 October; 17:30	Apogee: 124 kilometres (77 mi)					
19 October; 20:00	(United States) Aerobee-150A		(United States) Wallops Island		(United States) NASA	
19 October; 20:00		UCO	Suborbital	UV Astronomy	19 October	Successful
19 October; 20:00	Apogee: 179 kilometres (111 mi)					
19 October; 23:10	(United States) Nike-Cajun		(United States) Wallops Island		(United States) NASA	
19 October; 23:10		NASA	Suborbital	Aeronomy	19 October	Successful
19 October; 23:10	Apogee: 114 kilometres (71 mi)					
20 October; 05:20	(United Kingdom) Skylark 3AC		(Australia) Woomera LA-2		(United Kingdom) (Australia) RAE/WRE	
20 October; 05:20		CULH	Suborbital	Solar	20 October	Successful
20 October; 05:20	Apogee: 214 kilometres (133 mi)					
20 October; 18:09:22	(United States) LGM-25C Titan II		(United States) Vandenberg LC-395C		(United States) Strategic Air Command	
20 October; 18:09:22		Strategic Air Command	Suborbital	Missile test	20 October	Successful
20 October; 18:09:22	Apogee: 1,300 kilometres (810 mi)					
20 October; 20:35	(United States) Aerobee-150 (Hi)		(United States) White Sands LC-35		(United States) NASA	
20 October; 20:35		NRL	Suborbital	Astronomy; Solar	20 October	Successful
20 October; 20:35	Apogee: 184 kilometres (114 mi)					
20 October	(United States) Terrier/551		(United States) San Nicolas		(United States) US Navy	
20 October		US Navy	Suborbital	Test flight	20 October	Launch failure
20 October	Apogee: 5 kilometres (3.1 mi)					
21 October; 16:00	(United States) Aerobee-150 (Hi)		(United States) Wallops Island		(United States) NASA	
21 October; 16:00		Johns Hopkins	Suborbital	UV Astronomy	21 October	Successful
21 October; 16:00	Apogee: 191 kilometres (119 mi)					
21 October	(United States) Nike-Apache		(United States) White Sands		(United States) US Army	
21 October		US Army	Suborbital	Target	21 October	Successful
21 October	Apogee: 100 kilometres (62 mi)					
22 October; 07:54:28	(United States) Nike-Iroquois		(United States) Fort Wainwright		(United States) US Air Force	
22 October; 07:54:28		AFCRL	Suborbital	Ionospheric	22 October	Successful
22 October; 07:54:28	Apogee: 137 kilometres (85 mi)					
22 October; 20:18	(France) Veronique AGI		(Algeria) Hammaguira Blandine		(France) CNES	
22 October; 20:18		BREI	Suborbital	Ionospheric	22 October	Successful
22 October; 20:18	Apogee: 210 kilometres (130 mi)					
23 October; 05:30	(United States) Aerobee-150 (Hi)		(United States) White Sands LC-35		(United States) NRL	
23 October; 05:30		NRL	Suborbital	Aeronomy	23 October	Successful
23 October; 05:30	Apogee: 254 kilometres (158 mi)					
23 October; 15:38	(United States) Nike-Cajun		(United States) Point Barrow		(United States) NASA	
23 October; 15:38		NASA	Suborbital	Aeronomy	23 October	Successful
23 October; 15:38	Apogee: 100 kilometres (62 mi)					
23 October; 16:14	(United States) Nike-Cajun		(United States) Wallops Island		(United States) NASA	
23 October; 16:14		NASA	Suborbital	Aeronomy	23 October	Successful
23 October; 16:14	Apogee: 118 kilometres (73 mi)					
23 October; 16:38	(United States) Nike-Cajun		(Canada) Fort Churchill		(United States) NASA	
23 October; 16:38		NASA	Suborbital	Aeronomy	23 October	Successful
23 October; 16:38	Apogee: 114 kilometres (71 mi)					
25 October	(France) Vesta		(Algeria) Hammaguira Blandine		(France) CNES	
25 October		LRBA	Suborbital	Test flight	25 October	Successful
25 October	Apogee: 105 kilometres (65 mi)					
26 October; 12:03	(Soviet Union) MR-12		(Soviet Union) Kapustin Yar		(Soviet Union) AN	
26 October; 12:03		AN	Suborbital	Aeronomy; Ionospheric	26 October	Successful
26 October; 12:03	Apogee: 170 kilometres (110 mi)					
26 October; 15:25	(United States) Aerobee-150 (Hi)		(United States) White Sands LC-35		(United States) NASA	
26 October; 15:25		NASA	Suborbital	Solar	26 October	Successful
26 October; 15:25	Apogee: 195 kilometres (121 mi)					
27 October; 23:48	(United States) Nike-Cajun		(Canada) Fort Churchill		(United States) NASA	
27 October; 23:48		NASA	Suborbital	Aeronomy	27 October	Successful
27 October; 23:48	Apogee: 118 kilometres (73 mi)					
27 October; 23:48	(United States) Nike-Cajun		(United States) Point Barrow		(United States) NASA	
27 October; 23:48		NASA	Suborbital	Aeronomy	27 October	Successful
27 October; 23:48	Apogee: 100 kilometres (62 mi)					
28 October; 00:10	(United States) Nike-Cajun		(United States) Wallops Island		(United States) NASA	
28 October; 00:10		NASA	Suborbital	Aeronomy	28 October	Successful
28 October; 00:10	Apogee: 117 kilometres (73 mi)					
28 October; 06:55	(France) Veronique AGI		(Algeria) Hammaguira Blandine		(France) CNES	
28 October; 06:55		BREI	Suborbital	Ionospheric	28 October	Successful
28 October; 06:55	Apogee: 210 kilometres (130 mi)					
28 October; 18:01:50	(United States) Hydra-Iris		(United States) USNS Wheeling, PO-1		(United States) US Navy	
28 October; 18:01:50		LRL	Suborbital	XR astronomy	28 October	Successful
28 October; 18:01:50	Apogee: 194 kilometres (121 mi)					
29 October; 11:30	(United States) Aerobee-150 (Hi)		(United States) White Sands LC-35		(United States) NRL	
29 October; 11:30		NRL	Suborbital	IR Astronomy	29 October	Successful
29 October; 11:30	Apogee: 205 kilometres (127 mi)					
29 October	(Soviet Union) R-36		(Soviet Union) Baikonur PU-33		(Soviet Union) RVSN	
29 October		RVSN	Suborbital	Missile test	29 October	Successful
29 October	Apogee: 1,000 kilometres (620 mi)					
October	(United States) Nike-Apache		(United States) White Sands		(United States) US Army	
October		US Army	Suborbital	Target	October	Successful
October	Apogee: 100 kilometres (62 mi)					
October	(United States) MGM-31 Pershing I		(United States) Gilson Butte		(United States) US Army	
October		US Army	Suborbital	Missile test	October	Successful
October	Apogee: 250 kilometres (160 mi)					
October	(United States) MGM-31 Pershing I		(United States) Gilson Butte		(United States) US Army	
October		US Army	Suborbital	Missile test	October	Successful
October	Apogee: 250 kilometres (160 mi)					
October	(Soviet Union) RT-1		(Soviet Union) Kapustin Yar		(Soviet Union) RVSN	
October		RVSN	Suborbital	Missile test	October	Successful
October	Apogee: 500 kilometres (310 mi)					
=== November ===
2 November; 20:00	(United States) Exos		(United States) Eglin		(United States) US Air Force	
2 November; 20:00		AFCRL	Suborbital	Aeronomy	2 November	Successful
2 November; 20:00	Apogee: 686 kilometres (426 mi)					
2 November; 23:35:00	(United States) Sparrow-Arcas		(United States) Eglin		(United States) US Air Force	
2 November; 23:35:00		AFCRL	Suborbital	Aeronomy; Ionospheric	2 November	Successful
2 November; 23:35:00	Apogee: 134 kilometres (83 mi)					
2 November	(Soviet Union) R-36		(Soviet Union) Baikonur PU-31		(Soviet Union) RVSN	
2 November		RVSN	Suborbital	Missile test	2 November	Successful
2 November	Apogee: 1,000 kilometres (620 mi)					
3 November; 09:17	(United States) Nike-Cajun		(United States) Eglin		(United States) US Air Force	
3 November; 09:17		AFCRL	Suborbital	Aeronomy	3 November	Successful
3 November; 09:17	Apogee: 137 kilometres (85 mi)					
3 November; 19:00	(United States) Aerobee-150 (Hi)		(United States) White Sands LC-35		(United States) US Air Force	
3 November; 19:00		AFCRL	Suborbital	Solar	3 November	Successful
3 November; 19:00	Apogee: 210 kilometres (130 mi)					
3 November	(Soviet Union) UR-100		(Soviet Union) Baikonur		(Soviet Union) RVSN	
3 November		RVSN	Suborbital	Missile test	3 November	Launch failure
4 November	(Soviet Union) R-16U		(Soviet Union) Baikonur Site 41/3		(Soviet Union) RVSN	
4 November		RVSN	Suborbital	Missile test	4 November	Successful
4 November	Apogee: 1,210 kilometres (750 mi)					
5 November	(Soviet Union) UR-100		(Soviet Union) Baikonur		(Soviet Union) RVSN	
5 November		RVSN	Suborbital	Missile test	5 November	Launch failure
5 November	(United States) UGM-27 Polaris A3		(United States) USS James Madison, ETR		(United States) US Navy	
5 November		US Navy	Suborbital	Missile test	5 November	Successful
5 November	Apogee: 1,000 kilometres (620 mi)					
5 November	(United States) UGM-27 Polaris A3		(United States) USS James Madison, ETR		(United States) US Navy	
5 November		US Navy	Suborbital	Missile test	5 November	Successful
5 November	Apogee: 1,000 kilometres (620 mi)					
5 November	(United States) UGM-27 Polaris A3		(United States) USS James Madison, ETR		(United States) US Navy	
5 November		US Navy	Suborbital	Missile test	5 November	Successful
5 November	Apogee: 1,000 kilometres (620 mi)					
5 November	(United States) UGM-27 Polaris A3		(United States) USS James Madison, ETR		(United States) US Navy	
5 November		US Navy	Suborbital	Missile test	5 November	Successful
5 November	Apogee: 1,000 kilometres (620 mi)					
5 November	(United States) Athena RTV		(United States) Green River Pad 1		(United States) US Air Force	
5 November		US Air Force	Suborbital	REV Test	5 November	Successful
5 November	Apogee: 200 kilometres (120 mi)					
8 November; 05:05	(Japan) Kappa 10		(Japan) Kagoshima		(Japan) ISAS	
8 November; 05:05		ISAS	Suborbital	Ionospheric	8 November	Successful
8 November; 05:05	Apogee: 228 kilometres (142 mi)					
9 November; 09:58	(United States) HAD		(Australia) Woomera LA-2		(Australia) WRE	
9 November; 09:58		WRE	Suborbital	Aeronomy	9 November	Successful
9 November; 09:58	Apogee: 100 kilometres (62 mi)					
9 November; 18:40:00	(United States) Nike-Apache		(Canada) Fort Churchill		(United States) NASA	
9 November; 18:40:00		Michigan	Suborbital	Aeronomy	9 November	Successful
9 November; 18:40:00	Apogee: 144 kilometres (89 mi)					
9 November; 19:00	(United States) Aerobee-150 (Hi)		(United States) White Sands LC-35		(United States) US Air Force	
9 November; 19:00		US Air Force	Suborbital	Solar	9 November	Successful
9 November; 19:00	Apogee: 238 kilometres (148 mi)					
9 November; 19:16	(United States) Nike-Tomahawk		(Canada) Fort Churchill		(United States) NASA	
9 November; 19:16		NASA	Suborbital	Aeronomy	9 November	Successful
9 November; 19:16	Apogee: 328 kilometres (204 mi)					
9 November	(United States) Honest John-Nike-Hydac		(United States) Eglin		(United States) US Air Force	
9 November		US Air Force	Suborbital	Aeronomy	9 November	Successful
9 November	Apogee: 521 kilometres (324 mi)					
9 November	(United States) LGM-30F Minuteman II		(United States) Vandenberg LF-21		(United States) US Air Force	
9 November		US Air Force	Suborbital	Missile test	9 November	Successful
9 November	Apogee: 1,300 kilometres (810 mi)					
10 November; 02:30	(United States) Aerobee-150 (Hi)		(United States) White Sands LC-35		(United States) US Air Force	
10 November; 02:30		AFCRL	Suborbital	IR Astronomy	10 November	Successful
10 November; 02:30	Apogee: 180 kilometres (110 mi)					
10 November; 06:30	(United States) Nike-Apache		(Canada) Fort Churchill		(United States) NASA	
10 November; 06:30		Michigan	Suborbital	Aeronomy	10 November	Launch failure
10 November; 06:30	Apogee: 2 kilometres (1.2 mi)					
10 November; 07:00	(United States) Nike-Tomahawk		(Canada) Fort Churchill		(United States) NASA	
10 November; 07:00		NASA	Suborbital	Aeronomy	10 November	Successful
10 November; 07:00	Apogee: 328 kilometres (204 mi)					
11 November; 04:10	(United States) Nike-Cajun		(United States) Eglin		(United States) US Air Force	
11 November; 04:10		AFCRL	Suborbital	Aeronomy	11 November	Successful
11 November; 04:10	Apogee: 113 kilometres (70 mi)					
11 November; 04:15:00	(United States) Sparrow-Arcas		(United States) Eglin		(United States) US Air Force	
11 November; 04:15:00		AFCRL	Suborbital	Aeronomy; Ionospheric	11 November	Successful
11 November; 04:15:00	Apogee: 137 kilometres (85 mi)					
12 November; 22:28:14	(United States) UGM-27 Polaris A1		(United States) Cape Canaveral LC-29A		(United States) US Navy	
12 November; 22:28:14		US Navy	Suborbital	Missile test	12 November	Successful
12 November; 22:28:14	Apogee: 500 kilometres (310 mi)					
12 November	(United States) Nike-Tomahawk		(United States) Barking Sands		(United States) Sandia	
12 November		Sandia	Suborbital	Aeronomy	12 November	Successful
12 November	Apogee: 300 kilometres (190 mi)					
12 November	(Soviet Union) R-16U		(Soviet Union) Baikonur Site 41/4		(Soviet Union) RVSN	
12 November		RVSN	Suborbital	Missile test	12 November	Successful
12 November	Apogee: 1,210 kilometres (750 mi)					
14 November	(Soviet Union) R-36		(Soviet Union) Baikonur PU-32		(Soviet Union) RVSN	
14 November		RVSN	Suborbital	Missile test	14 November	Successful
14 November	Apogee: 1,000 kilometres (620 mi)					
15 November; 20:03	(Canada) Martlet 3		Barbados		(Canada) (United States) DND/DoD	
15 November; 20:03		DND/DoD	Suborbital	Test flight	15 November	Launch failure
15 November; 20:03	Apogee: 10 kilometres (6.2 mi)					
16 November; 16:00	(United States) Aerobee-150 (Hi)		(United States) White Sands LC-35		(United States) NASA	
16 November; 16:00		ARC	Suborbital	Meteorite research	16 November	Successful
16 November; 16:00	Apogee: 144 kilometres (89 mi)					
16 November; 17:18	(Canada) Martlet 2		Barbados		(Canada) (United States) DND/DoD	
16 November; 17:18		DND/DoD	Suborbital	Test flight	16 November	Successful
16 November; 17:18	Apogee: 110 kilometres (68 mi)					
16 November; 18:22	(United States) Nike-Cajun		(United States) Eglin		(United States) US Air Force	
16 November; 18:22		AFCRL	Suborbital	Aeronomy; Ionospheric	16 November	Successful
16 November; 18:22	Apogee: 114 kilometres (71 mi)					
16 November; 22:15:00	(United States) Nike-Cajun		(United States) Eglin		(United States) US Air Force	
16 November; 22:15:00		AFCRL	Suborbital	Aeronomy	16 November	
16 November; 22:15:00	Apogee: 130 kilometres (81 mi)					
16 November; 22:15	(Canada) Martlet 2		Barbados		(Canada) (United States) DND/DoD	
16 November; 22:15		DND/DoD	Suborbital	Ionospheric	16 November	Successful
16 November; 22:15	Apogee: 119 kilometres (74 mi)					
16 November; 23:00	(United States) Honest John-Nike-Nike		(United States) Barking Sands		(United States) Sandia	
16 November; 23:00		NASA	Suborbital	Aeronomy	16 November	Successful
16 November; 23:00	Apogee: 183 kilometres (114 mi)					
17 November; 04:25	(United States) Nike-Apache		(Canada) Fort Churchill		(United States) NASA	
17 November; 04:25		Fairbanks	Suborbital	Auroral	17 November	Successful
17 November; 04:25	Apogee: 178 kilometres (111 mi)					
17 November; 22:15	(Canada) Martlet 2		Barbados		(Canada) (United States) DND/DoD	
17 November; 22:15		DND/DoD	Suborbital	Aeronomy	17 November	Successful
17 November; 22:15	Apogee: 120 kilometres (75 mi)					
17 November; 23:34	(Canada) Martlet 2		Barbados		(Canada) (United States) DND/DoD	
17 November; 23:34		DND/DoD	Suborbital	Aeronomy	17 November	Successful
17 November; 23:34	Apogee: 122 kilometres (76 mi)					
17 November; 23:36	(United States) Nike-Cajun		(United States) Eglin		(United States) US Air Force	
17 November; 23:36		AFCRL	Suborbital	Aeronomy	17 November	Successful
17 November; 23:36	Apogee: 155 kilometres (96 mi)					
18 November; 00:38	(Canada) Martlet 2		Barbados		(Canada) (United States) DND/DoD	
18 November; 00:38		DND/DoD	Suborbital	Aeronomy	18 November	Launch failure
18 November; 00:38	Apogee: 71 kilometres (44 mi)					
18 November; 02:20:00	(United States) Sparrow-Arcas		(United States) Eglin		(United States) US Air Force	
18 November; 02:20:00		AFCRL	Suborbital	Aeronomy	18 November	
18 November; 02:20:00	Apogee: 130 kilometres (81 mi)					
18 November; 03:15	(Canada) Martlet 2		Barbados		(Canada) (United States) DND/DoD	
18 November; 03:15		DND/DoD	Suborbital	Aeronomy	18 November	Successful
18 November; 03:15	Apogee: 123 kilometres (76 mi)					
18 November; 04:45	(Canada) Martlet 2		Barbados		(Canada) (United States) DND/DoD	
18 November; 04:45		DND/DoD	Suborbital	Aeronomy	18 November	Successful
18 November; 04:45	Apogee: 126 kilometres (78 mi)					
18 November; 05:20:00	(United States) Sparrow-Arcas		(United States) Eglin		(United States) US Air Force	
18 November; 05:20:00		AFCRL	Suborbital	Aeronomy	18 November	
18 November; 05:20:00	Apogee: 130 kilometres (81 mi)					
18 November; 05:20	(United States) Nike-Cajun		(United States) Eglin		(United States) US Air Force	
18 November; 05:20		US Air Force	Suborbital	Aeronomy	18 November	Successful
18 November; 05:20	Apogee: 116 kilometres (72 mi)					
18 November; 05:20	(United States) Nike-Cajun		(United States) Eglin		(United States) US Air Force	
18 November; 05:20		US Air Force	Suborbital	Aeronomy	18 November	Successful
18 November; 05:20	Apogee: 107 kilometres (66 mi)					
18 November; 05:58	(Canada) Martlet 2		Barbados		(Canada) (United States) DND/DoD	
18 November; 05:58		DND/DoD	Suborbital	Aeronomy	18 November	Launch failure
18 November; 05:58	Apogee: 32 kilometres (20 mi)					
18 November; 07:30	(Canada) Martlet 2		Barbados		(Canada) (United States) DND/DoD	
18 November; 07:30		DND/DoD	Suborbital	Aeronomy	18 November	Successful
18 November; 07:30	Apogee: 122 kilometres (76 mi)					
18 November; 08:01:00	(United States) Sparrow-Arcas		(United States) Eglin		(United States) US Air Force	
18 November; 08:01:00		AFCRL	Suborbital	Aeronomy; Ionospheric	18 November	Successful
18 November; 08:01:00	Apogee: 137 kilometres (85 mi)					
18 November; 09:08	(Canada) Martlet 2		Barbados		(Canada) (United States) DND/DoD	
18 November; 09:08		DND/DoD	Suborbital	Aeronomy	18 November	Successful
18 November; 09:08	Apogee: 119 kilometres (74 mi)					
18 November; 11:21	(United States) Nike-Cajun		(United States) Eglin		(United States) US Air Force	
18 November; 11:21		AFCRL	Suborbital	Aeronomy	18 November	Successful
18 November; 11:21	Apogee: 155 kilometres (96 mi)					
18 November; 14:31	(United States) Nike-Apache		(United States) White Sands		(United States) NASA	
18 November; 14:31		DUD	Suborbital	Meteorite research	18 November	Successful
18 November; 14:31	Apogee: 149 kilometres (93 mi)					
18 November; 17:45	(France) Centaure 1		(Algeria) Hammaguira Bou Hammadi		(France) CNES	
18 November; 17:45		MPE	Suborbital	Aeronomy	18 November	Successful
18 November; 17:45	Apogee: 170 kilometres (110 mi)					
18 November	(United States) Nike-Javelin		(United States) Eglin		(United States) US Air Force	
18 November		AFCRL	Suborbital	Aeronomy	18 November	Successful
18 November	Apogee: 130 kilometres (81 mi)					
19 November; 04:54	(United Kingdom) Skylark-7C		(Australia) Woomera LA-2		(United Kingdom) (Australia) RAE/WRE	
19 November; 04:54		UCL/QUB	Suborbital	Ionospheric; Solar	19 November	Successful
19 November; 04:54	Apogee: 138 kilometres (86 mi)					
19 November; 17:45	(France) Centaure 1		(Algeria) Hammaguira Bou Hammadi		(France) CNES	
19 November; 17:45		MPE	Suborbital	Aeronomy	19 November	Successful
19 November; 17:45	Apogee: 190 kilometres (120 mi)					
20 November; 00:37:53	(United States) Nike-Apache		(Norway) Andøya		(Norway) NDRE	
20 November; 00:37:53		NASA	Suborbital	Ionospheric	20 November	Successful
20 November; 00:37:53	Apogee: 122 kilometres (76 mi)					
20 November; 05:20	(United States) Nike-Apache		(Canada) Fort Churchill		(United States) NASA	
20 November; 05:20		Fairbanks	Suborbital	Auroral	20 November	Successful
20 November; 05:20	Apogee: 175 kilometres (109 mi)					
20 November; 08:28	(United States) Aerobee-150 (Hi)		(United States) White Sands LC-35		(United States) KPNO	
20 November; 08:28		KPNO	Suborbital	UV Astronomy	20 November	Successful
20 November; 08:28	Apogee: 150 kilometres (93 mi)					
20 November; 16:00	(Canada) Martlet 2		Barbados		(Canada) (United States) DND/DoD	
20 November; 16:00		DND/DoD	Suborbital	Test flight	20 November	Successful
20 November; 16:00	Apogee: 104 kilometres (65 mi)					
20 November; 17:53	(France) Dragon		(Algeria) Hammaguira Bou Hammadi		(France) CNES	
20 November; 17:53		MPE	Suborbital	Aeronomy	20 November	Successful
20 November; 17:53	Apogee: 404 kilometres (251 mi)					
20 November; 20:47	(Canada) Martlet 2		Barbados		(Canada) (United States) DND/DoD	
20 November; 20:47		DND/DoD	Suborbital	Aeronomy	20 November	Launch failure
20 November; 20:47	Apogee: 58 kilometres (36 mi)					
21 November; 16:10	(Canada) Martlet 2		Barbados		(Canada) (United States) DND/DoD	
21 November; 16:10		DND/DoD	Suborbital	Test flight	21 November	Successful
21 November; 16:10	Apogee: 128 kilometres (80 mi)					
22 November; 06:35	(Japan) LS-A		(Japan) Niijima		(France) STA	
22 November; 06:35		STA	Suborbital	Test flight	22 November	Successful
22 November; 06:35	Apogee: 150 kilometres (93 mi)					
22 November; 22:15	(United States) Nike-Tomahawk		(United States) Barking Sands		(United States) Sandia	
22 November; 22:15		NASA	Suborbital	XR astronomy	22 November	Launch failure
22 November; 22:15	Apogee: 10 kilometres (6.2 mi)					
22 November; 23:09	(Canada) Martlet 2		Barbados		(United States) US Air Force	
22 November; 23:09		US Army	Suborbital	Aeronomy	22 November	Successful
22 November; 23:09	Apogee: 142 kilometres (88 mi)					
22 November; 23:30	(Canada) Martlet 2		Barbados		(United States) US Air Force	
22 November; 23:30		US Army	Suborbital	Aeronomy	22 November	Successful
22 November; 23:30	Apogee: 133 kilometres (83 mi)					
22 November	(United States) Athena RTV		(United States) Green River Pad 3		(United States) US Air Force	
22 November		US Air Force	Suborbital	REV Test	22 November	Launch failure
22 November	(United States) Nike-Tomahawk		(United States) Barking Sands		(United States) Sandia	
22 November		Sandia	Suborbital	Aeronomy	22 November	Successful
22 November	Apogee: 200 kilometres (120 mi)					
22 November	(United States) Nike-Tomahawk		(United States) Barking Sands		(United States) Sandia	
22 November		Sandia	Suborbital	Aeronomy	22 November	Launch failure
22 November	Apogee: 270 kilometres (170 mi)					
23 November; 00:30:00	(United States) Nike-Cajun		(United States) Eglin		(United States) US Air Force	
23 November; 00:30:00		US Air Force	Suborbital	Aeronomy	23 November	
23 November; 00:30:00	Apogee: 100 kilometres (62 mi)					
23 November; 00:55	(Canada) Martlet 2		Barbados		(United States) US Air Force	
23 November; 00:55		US Army	Suborbital	Aeronomy	23 November	Launch failure
23 November; 00:55	Apogee: 31 kilometres (19 mi)					
23 November; 02:59	(Canada) Martlet 2		Barbados		(United States) US Air Force	
23 November; 02:59		US Army	Suborbital	Aeronomy	23 November	Successful
23 November; 02:59	Apogee: 135 kilometres (84 mi)					
23 November; 05:31	(Canada) Martlet 2		Barbados		(United States) US Air Force	
23 November; 05:31		US Army	Suborbital	Aeronomy	23 November	Successful
23 November; 05:31	Apogee: 133 kilometres (83 mi)					
23 November; 07:28	(Canada) Martlet 2		Barbados		(United States) US Air Force	
23 November; 07:28		US Army	Suborbital	Aeronomy	23 November	Successful
23 November; 07:28	Apogee: 143 kilometres (89 mi)					
23 November; 09:16	(Canada) Martlet 2		Barbados		(United States) US Air Force	
23 November; 09:16		US Army	Suborbital	Aeronomy	23 November	Successful
23 November; 09:16	Apogee: 141 kilometres (88 mi)					
24 November; 04:04	(United States) Nike-Apache		(Canada) Fort Churchill		(United States) NASA	
24 November; 04:04		Fairbanks	Suborbital	Auroral	24 November	Successful
24 November; 04:04	Apogee: 175 kilometres (109 mi)					
24 November; 15:37	(United States) Nike-Apache		(United States) Wallops Island		(United States) NASA	
24 November; 15:37		Rice	Suborbital	Plasma research	24 November	Successful
24 November; 15:37	Apogee: 169 kilometres (105 mi)					
25 November; 04:40	(France) Centaure 1		(Argentina) CELPA		(Argentina) CNIE	
25 November; 04:40		Zaragoza	Suborbital	Aeronomy	25 November	Successful
25 November; 04:40	Apogee: 175 kilometres (109 mi)					
25 November; 08:24	(France) Centaure 1		(Argentina) CELPA		(Argentina) CNIE	
25 November; 08:24		Zaragoza	Suborbital	Aeronomy	25 November	Successful
25 November; 08:24	Apogee: 175 kilometres (109 mi)					
25 November; 13:20	(United Kingdom) Black Knight 301		(Australia) Woomera LA-5		(United Kingdom) RAE	
25 November; 13:20		RAE	Suborbital	REV Test	25 November	Successful
25 November; 13:20	Apogee: 632 kilometres (393 mi)					
26 November; 08:24	(France) Centaure 1		(Argentina) CELPA		(Argentina) CNIE	
26 November; 08:24		Zaragoza	Suborbital	Aeronomy	26 November	Successful
26 November; 08:24	Apogee: 175 kilometres (109 mi)					
26 November; 14:47:21	(France) Diamant A		(Algeria) Hammaguira Brigitte		(France) Armée de Terre	
26 November; 14:47:21	(France) Asterix (A-1)	Armée de Terre	Low Earth	Technology	In orbit	Successful
26 November; 14:47:21	First French orbital launch and satellite.					
27 November; 10:00:50	(United States) LGM-25C Titan II		(United States) Vandenberg LC-395D		(United States) Strategic Air Command	
27 November; 10:00:50		Strategic Air Command	Suborbital	Missile test	27 November	Successful
27 November; 10:00:50	Apogee: 1,300 kilometres (810 mi)					
27 November	(Soviet Union) R-36		(Soviet Union) Baikonur PU-33		(Soviet Union) RVSN	
27 November		RVSN	Suborbital	Missile test	27 November	Successful
27 November	Apogee: 1,000 kilometres (620 mi)					
29 November; 14:30:13	(United States) SM-65D Atlas		(United States) Vandenberg ABRES-A-1		(United States) US Air Force	
29 November; 14:30:13		US Air Force	Suborbital	REV Test	29 November	Successful
29 November; 14:30:13	Apogee: 1,800 kilometres (1,100 mi)					
30 November; 07:48	(United States) Aerobee-150 (Hi)		(United States) White Sands LC-35		(United States) NASA	
30 November; 07:48		NASA	Suborbital	UV Astronomy	30 November	Successful
30 November; 07:48	Apogee: 179 kilometres (111 mi)					
30 November; 14:44:33	(United States) LGM-25C Titan II		(United States) Vandenberg LC-395B		(United States) Strategic Air Command	
30 November; 14:44:33		Strategic Air Command	Suborbital	Missile test	30 November	Successful
30 November; 14:44:33	Apogee: 1,300 kilometres (810 mi)					
30 November	(Soviet Union) UR-100		(Soviet Union) Baikonur		(Soviet Union) RVSN	
30 November		RVSN	Suborbital	Missile test	30 November	Launch failure
November	(Soviet Union) RT-1		(Soviet Union) Kapustin Yar		(Soviet Union) RVSN	
November		RVSN	Suborbital	Missile test	November	Launch failure
November	Apogee: 10 kilometres (6.2 mi)					
November	(United States) Nike-Apache		(United States) White Sands		(United States) US Army	
November		US Army	Suborbital	Target	November	Successful
November	Apogee: 100 kilometres (62 mi)					
November	(United States) Nike-Apache		(United States) White Sands		(United States) US Air Force	
November		US Air Force	Suborbital	Target	November	Successful
November	Apogee: 100 kilometres (62 mi)					
November	(United States) Nike-Javelin		(United States) White Sands		(United States) DASA	
November		DASA	Suborbital	Aeronomy	November	Successful
November	Apogee: 100 kilometres (62 mi)					
November	(United States) Nike-Javelin		(United States) White Sands		(United States) DASA	
November		DASA	Suborbital	Aeronomy	November	Successful
November	Apogee: 100 kilometres (62 mi)					
=== December ===
2 December; 17:30	(United States) Aerobee-150 (Hi)		(United States) White Sands LC-35		(United States) NASA	
2 December; 17:30		NASA	Suborbital	Solar	2 December	Successful
2 December; 17:30	Apogee: 185 kilometres (115 mi)					
6 December; 10:24	(United States) HAD		(Australia) Woomera LA-2		(Australia) WRE	
6 December; 10:24		WRE	Suborbital	Aeronomy	6 December	Successful
6 December; 10:24	Apogee: 100 kilometres (62 mi)					
6 December; 19:25:41	(United States) UGM-27 Polaris A3		(United States) USS Benjamin Franklin (SSBN-640), ETR		(United States) US Navy	
6 December; 19:25:41		US Navy	Suborbital	Missile test	6 December	Successful
6 December; 19:25:41	Apogee: 1,000 kilometres (620 mi), launch observed from orbit by Gemini VII					
6 December	(United States) Athena RTV		(United States) Green River Pad 3		(United States) US Air Force	
6 December		US Air Force	Suborbital	REV Test	6 December	Successful
6 December	Apogee: 200 kilometres (120 mi)					
7 December; 02:28	(United States) Thor DSV-2J		(United States) Johnston LE-2		(United States) US Air Force	
7 December; 02:28		US Air Force	Suborbital	ABM test	7 December	Successful
7 December; 02:28	Apogee: 487 kilometres (303 mi)					
7 December; 03:53	(France) Centaure 1		(Italy) Salto di Quirra		(Europe) ESRO	
7 December; 03:53		ESRO	Suborbital	Aeronomy	7 December	Successful
7 December; 03:53	Apogee: 150 kilometres (93 mi)					
7 December	(Soviet Union) R-36		(Soviet Union) Baikonur PU-32		(Soviet Union) RVSN	
7 December		RVSN	Suborbital	Missile test	7 December	Successful
7 December	Apogee: 1,000 kilometres (620 mi)					
8 December; 13:21	(Canada) Black Brant III		(United States) Eglin		(United States) NRL	
8 December; 13:21		NRL	Suborbital	Aeronomy	8 December	Successful
8 December; 13:21	Apogee: 140 kilometres (87 mi)					
9 December; 20:33	(United States) Nike-Cajun		(Canada) Fort Churchill		(United States) US Air Force	
9 December; 20:33		AFCRL	Suborbital	Aeronomy	9 December	Successful
9 December; 20:33	Apogee: 139 kilometres (86 mi)					
10 December; 05:00	(United States) Nike-Cajun		(Canada) Fort Churchill		(United States) US Air Force	
10 December; 05:00		AFCRL	Suborbital	Aeronomy	10 December	Successful
10 December; 05:00	Apogee: 141 kilometres (88 mi)					
10 December	(United States) Athena RTV		(United States) Green River Pad 1		(United States) US Air Force	
10 December		US Air Force	Suborbital	REV Test	10 December	Successful
10 December	Apogee: 200 kilometres (120 mi)					
11 December; 04:05	(France) Centaure 1		(Italy) Salto di Quirra		(Europe) ESRO	
11 December; 04:05		ESRO	Suborbital	Aeronomy	11 December	Successful
11 December; 04:05	Apogee: 159 kilometres (99 mi)					
11 December; 18:55	(United States) Nike-Apache		(Canada) Fort Churchill		(United States) US Air Force	
11 December; 18:55		AFCRL	Suborbital	Aeronomy	11 December	Successful
11 December; 18:55	Apogee: 155 kilometres (96 mi)					
11 December	(United States) Nike-Javelin		(United States) Eglin		(United States) US Air Force	
11 December		US Air Force	Suborbital	Aeronomy	11 December	Successful
11 December	Apogee: 130 kilometres (81 mi)					
12 December; 04:51	(United States) Nike-Apache		(Canada) Fort Churchill		(United States) US Air Force	
12 December; 04:51		AFCRL	Suborbital	Aeronomy	12 December	Successful
12 December; 04:51	Apogee: 155 kilometres (96 mi)					
13 December; 06:20	(Japan) Kappa-9M		(Japan) Kagoshima		(Japan) ISAS	
13 December; 06:20		Osaka	Suborbital	Aeronomy; Ionospheric	13 December	Successful
13 December; 06:20	Apogee: 318 kilometres (198 mi)					
13 December; 10:08	(United Kingdom) Skylark-7C		(Australia) Woomera LA-2		(United Kingdom) (Australia) RAE/WRE	
13 December; 10:08		UCL/QUB	Suborbital	Ionospheric; Solar	13 December	Successful
13 December; 10:08	Apogee: 130 kilometres (81 mi)					
14 December; 12:49	(France) Centaure 1		(Italy) Salto di Quirra		(Europe) ESRO	
14 December; 12:49		UCL	Suborbital	Solar	14 December	Successful
14 December; 12:49	Apogee: 159 kilometres (99 mi)					
14 December; 17:20	(United States) LGM-30A Minuteman IA		(United States) Vandenberg LF-04		(United States) Strategic Air Command	
14 December; 17:20		Strategic Air Command	Suborbital	Missile test	14 December	Successful
14 December; 17:20	Apogee: 1,300 kilometres (810 mi)					
14 December	(Soviet Union) R-7A Semyorka		(Soviet Union) Plesetsk Site 41/1		(Soviet Union) RVSN	
14 December		RVSN	Suborbital	Missile test	14 December	Successful
14 December	Apogee: 1,350 kilometres (840 mi)					
15 December; 17:00:00	(United States) Nike-Apache		(United States) Wallops Island		(United States) NASA	
15 December; 17:00:00		Urbana-Champaign	Suborbital	Ionospheric	15 December	Successful
15 December; 17:00:00	Apogee: 184 kilometres (114 mi)					
15 December; 19:19	(United States) Nike-Apache		(Brazil) Barreira do Inferno		(United States) NASA	
15 December; 19:19		NASA/INPE	Suborbital	Ionospheric	15 December	Successful
15 December; 19:19	Apogee: 185 kilometres (115 mi)					
16 December	(Soviet Union) R-36O		(Soviet Union) Baikonur Site 67/21		(Soviet Union) RVSN	
16 December	(Soviet Union) OGCh #01L	RVSN	Suborbital	Missile test	16 December	Successful
16 December	Maiden flight of R-36O, apogee: 200 kilometres (120 mi)					
16 December	(United States) LGM-30F Minuteman II		(United States) Vandenberg LF-24		(United States) US Air Force	
16 December		US Air Force	Suborbital	Missile test	16 December	Successful
16 December	Apogee: 1,300 kilometres (810 mi)					
16 December	(France) Centaure 1		(Algeria) Hammaguira Bacchus		(France) CNES	
16 December		GRI	Suborbital	Ionospheric	16 December	Successful
16 December	Apogee: 150 kilometres (93 mi)					
16 December	(France) Centaure 1		(Algeria) Hammaguira Bacchus		(France) CNES	
16 December		GRI	Suborbital	Ionospheric	16 December	Successful
16 December	Apogee: 150 kilometres (93 mi)					
16 December	(France) Centaure 1		(Algeria) Hammaguira Bacchus		(France) CNES	
16 December		CNRS	Suborbital	Aeronomy	16 December	Successful
16 December	Apogee: 150 kilometres (93 mi)					
18 December; 04:59	(United States) Nike-Apache		(Brazil) Barreira do Inferno		(United States) NASA	
18 December; 04:59		NASA/INPE	Suborbital	Ionospheric	18 December	Successful
18 December; 04:59	Apogee: 188 kilometres (117 mi)					
18 December; 06:00	(Japan) Kappa-9M		(Japan) Kagoshima		(Japan) ISAS	
18 December; 06:00		Nagasaki	Suborbital	Ionospheric	18 December	Successful
18 December; 06:00	Apogee: 316 kilometres (196 mi)					
19 December	(Soviet Union) UR-100		(Soviet Union) Baikonur		(Soviet Union) RVSN	
19 December		RVSN	Suborbital	Missile test	19 December	Launch failure
20 December; 13:39:56	(United States) SM-65D Atlas		(United States) Vandenberg ABRES-B-2		(United States) US Air Force	
20 December; 13:39:56		US Air Force	Suborbital	REV Test	20 December	Successful
20 December; 13:39:56	Apogee: 1,800 kilometres (1,100 mi)					
20 December; 16:33:03	(United States) UGM-27 Polaris A3		(United States) USS Benjamin Franklin, ETR		(United States) US Navy	
20 December; 16:33:03		US Navy	Suborbital	Missile test	20 December	Successful
20 December; 16:33:03	Apogee: 1,000 kilometres (620 mi)					
20 December	(France) Centaure 1		(Algeria) Hammaguira Bacchus		(France) CNES	
20 December		GRI	Suborbital	Ionospheric	20 December	Successful
20 December	Apogee: 150 kilometres (93 mi)					
21 December	(Soviet Union) R-7A Semyorka		(Soviet Union) Plesetsk Site 43/3		(Soviet Union) RVSN	
21 December		RVSN	Suborbital	Missile test	21 December	Successful
21 December	Apogee: 1,350 kilometres (840 mi)					
22 December; 14:10:45	(United States) LGM-25C Titan II		(United States) Vandenberg LC-395C		(United States) Strategic Air Command	
22 December; 14:10:45		Strategic Air Command	Suborbital	Missile test	22 December	Successful
22 December; 14:10:45	Apogee: 1,300 kilometres (810 mi)					
23 December	(France) Jericho		(France) CERES		(France) Dassault	
23 December		Dassault	Suborbital	Missile test	23 December	Launch failure
23 December	Apogee: 100 kilometres (62 mi)					
23 December	(Soviet Union) R-16U		(Soviet Union) Baikonur Site 41/4		(Soviet Union) RVSN	
23 December		RVSN	Suborbital	Missile test	23 December	Successful
23 December	Apogee: 1,210 kilometres (750 mi)					
25 December	(Soviet Union) R-16U		(Soviet Union) Baikonur Site 41/3		(Soviet Union) RVSN	
25 December		RVSN	Suborbital	Missile test	25 December	Successful
25 December	Apogee: 1,210 kilometres (750 mi)					
25 December	(Soviet Union) R-36		(Soviet Union) Baikonur PU-33		(Soviet Union) RVSN	
25 December		RVSN	Suborbital	Missile test	25 December	Successful
25 December	Apogee: 1,000 kilometres (620 mi)					
25 December	(Soviet Union) R-36		(Soviet Union) Baikonur PU-32		(Soviet Union) RVSN	
25 December		RVSN	Suborbital	Missile test	25 December	Successful
25 December	Apogee: 1,000 kilometres (620 mi)					
26 December	(Soviet Union) R-16U		(Soviet Union) Baikonur Site 41/3		(Soviet Union) RVSN	
26 December		RVSN	Suborbital	Missile test	26 December	Successful
26 December	Apogee: 1,210 kilometres (750 mi)					
26 December	(Soviet Union) R-36		(Soviet Union) Baikonur PU-31		(Soviet Union) RVSN	
26 December		RVSN	Suborbital	Missile test	26 December	Successful
26 December	Apogee: 1,000 kilometres (620 mi)					
30 December	(Soviet Union) UR-100		(Soviet Union) Baikonur		(Soviet Union) RVSN	
30 December		RVSN	Suborbital	Missile test	30 December	Launch failure
December	(Soviet Union) A-350Zh		(Soviet Union) Sary Shagan Site 6		(Soviet Union) PRO	
December		PRO	Suborbital	Missile test	December	Successful
December	Apogee: 100 kilometres (62 mi)					
December	(United States) Nike-Apache		(United States) White Sands		(United States) US Air Force	
December		US Air Force	Suborbital	Target	December	Successful
December	Apogee: 100 kilometres (62 mi)					
December	(Soviet Union) R-16U		(Soviet Union) Plesetsk		(Soviet Union) RVSN	
December		RVSN	Suborbital	Missile test	December	Successful
December	Apogee: 1,210 kilometres (750 mi)					
December	(Soviet Union) R-16U		(Soviet Union) Plesetsk		(Soviet Union) RVSN	
December		RVSN	Suborbital	Missile test	December	Successful
December	Apogee: 1,210 kilometres (750 mi)					
Unknown	(United States) Nike-Cajun		(United States) Tonopah		(United States) Sandia	
Unknown		Sandia	Suborbital	Technology	Unknown	Launch failure
Unknown	Apogee: 2 kilometres (1.2 mi)					
Unknown	(Soviet Union) MR-12		(Soviet Union) Kapustin Yar		(Soviet Union) AN	
Unknown		AN	Suborbital	Aeronomy	Unknown	Successful
Unknown	Apogee: 150 kilometres (93 mi)					
Unknown	(Soviet Union) R-27 Zyb		(Soviet Union) Nenoksa		(Soviet Union) RVSN	
Unknown		RVSN	Suborbital	Missile test	Unknown	Successful
Unknown	Apogee: 620 kilometres (390 mi)					
Unknown	(Soviet Union) R-9 Desna		(Soviet Union) Baikonur		(Soviet Union) RVSN	
Unknown		RVSN	Suborbital	Missile test	Unknown	Successful
Unknown	Apogee: 1,160 kilometres (720 mi)					
Unknown	(Soviet Union) R-9 Desna		(Soviet Union) Baikonur		(Soviet Union) RVSN	
Unknown		RVSN	Suborbital	Missile test	Unknown	Successful
Unknown	Apogee: 1,160 kilometres (720 mi)					
Unknown	(Soviet Union) R-9 Desna		(Soviet Union) Baikonur		(Soviet Union) RVSN	
Unknown		RVSN	Suborbital	Missile test	Unknown	Successful
Unknown	Apogee: 1,160 kilometres (720 mi)					
Unknown	(Soviet Union) R-9 Desna		(Soviet Union) Baikonur		(Soviet Union) RVSN	
Unknown		RVSN	Suborbital	Missile test	Unknown	Successful
Unknown	Apogee: 1,160 kilometres (720 mi)					
Unknown	(Soviet Union) RT-15		(Soviet Union) Kapustin Yar		(Soviet Union) RVSN	
Unknown		RVSN	Suborbital	Missile test	Unknown	Successful
Unknown	Apogee: 1,000 kilometres (620 mi)					
Unknown	(Soviet Union) RT-15		(Soviet Union) Kapustin Yar		(Soviet Union) RVSN	
Unknown		RVSN	Suborbital	Missile test	Unknown	Successful
Unknown	Apogee: 1,000 kilometres (620 mi)					
Unknown	(Soviet Union) RT-1		(Soviet Union) Kapustin Yar		(Soviet Union) RVSN	
Unknown		RVSN	Suborbital	Missile test	Unknown	Successful
Unknown	Apogee: 500 kilometres (310 mi)					
Unknown	(France) Berenice		(France) CERES		(France) ONERA	
Unknown		ONERA	Suborbital	REV Test	Unknown	Successful
Unknown	Apogee: 270 kilometres (170 mi)					
Unknown	(Soviet Union) UR-100		(Soviet Union) Baikonur		(Soviet Union) RVSN	
Unknown		RVSN	Suborbital	Missile test	Unknown	Successful
Unknown	Apogee: 1,000 kilometres (620 mi)					
Unknown	(Soviet Union) UR-100		(Soviet Union) Baikonur		(Soviet Union) RVSN	
Unknown		RVSN	Suborbital	Missile test	Unknown	Successful
Unknown	Apogee: 1,000 kilometres (620 mi)					
Unknown	(Soviet Union) UR-100		(Soviet Union) Baikonur		(Soviet Union) RVSN	
Unknown		RVSN	Suborbital	Missile test	Unknown	Successful
Unknown	Apogee: 1,000 kilometres (620 mi)					
Unknown	(Soviet Union) UR-100		(Soviet Union) Baikonur		(Soviet Union) RVSN	
Unknown		RVSN	Suborbital	Missile test	Unknown	Successful
Unknown	Apogee: 1,000 kilometres (620 mi)					
Unknown	(Soviet Union) UR-100		(Soviet Union) Baikonur		(Soviet Union) RVSN	
Unknown		RVSN	Suborbital	Missile test	Unknown	Successful
Unknown	Apogee: 1,000 kilometres (620 mi)					
Unknown	(Soviet Union) UR-100		(Soviet Union) Baikonur		(Soviet Union) RVSN	
Unknown		RVSN	Suborbital	Missile test	Unknown	Successful
Unknown	Apogee: 1,000 kilometres (620 mi)					
Unknown	(Soviet Union) UR-100		(Soviet Union) Baikonur		(Soviet Union) RVSN	
Unknown		RVSN	Suborbital	Missile test	Unknown	Successful
Unknown	Apogee: 1,000 kilometres (620 mi)					
Unknown	(Soviet Union) UR-100		(Soviet Union) Baikonur		(Soviet Union) RVSN	
Unknown		RVSN	Suborbital	Missile test	Unknown	Successful
Unknown	Apogee: 1,000 kilometres (620 mi)					
Unknown	(Soviet Union) UR-100		(Soviet Union) Baikonur		(Soviet Union) RVSN	
Unknown		RVSN	Suborbital	Missile test	Unknown	Successful
Unknown	Apogee: 1,000 kilometres (620 mi)					
Unknown	(Soviet Union) UR-100		(Soviet Union) Baikonur		(Soviet Union) RVSN	
Unknown		RVSN	Suborbital	Missile test	Unknown	Successful
Unknown	Apogee: 1,000 kilometres (620 mi)					
Unknown	(Soviet Union) UR-100		(Soviet Union) Baikonur		(Soviet Union) RVSN	
Unknown		RVSN	Suborbital	Missile test	Unknown	Successful
Unknown	Apogee: 1,000 kilometres (620 mi)					
Unknown	(Soviet Union) R-17 Elbrus		(Soviet Union) Kapustin Yar		(Soviet Union) MVS	
Unknown		MVS	Suborbital	Missile test	Unknown	Successful
Unknown	Apogee: 250 kilometres (160 mi)					

- ← Jan
- Feb
- Mar
- Apr
- May
- Jun
- Jul
- Aug
- Sep
- Oct
- Nov
- Dec →
