= Kosmos 93 =

Soviet armed forces technology development satellite

- Mission type: Technology
- COSPAR ID: 1965-084A
- SATCAT no.: 01629
- Mission duration: 76 days

Spacecraft properties
- Spacecraft type: DS-U2-V
- Manufacturer: Yuzhnoye
- Launch mass: 305 kg

Start of mission
- Launch date: 19 October 1965, 05:45:00 GMT
- Rocket: Kosmos-2M 63S1M
- Launch site: Kapustin Yar, Site 86/1
- Contractor: Yuzhnoye

End of mission
- Decay date: 3 January 1966

Orbital parameters
- Reference system: Geocentric
- Regime: Low Earth
- Perigee altitude: 216 km
- Apogee altitude: 513 km
- Inclination: 48.4°
- Period: 91.7 minutes
- Epoch: 19 October 1965

Kosmos 93 (Russian: Космос 93 meaning Cosmos 93), also known as DS-U2-V No.1, was a Soviet satellite which was launched in 1965 as part of the Dnepropetrovsk Sputnik programme. It was a 305 kilograms (672 lb) spacecraft, which was built by the Yuzhnoye Design Bureau, and was used to conduct classified technology development experiments for the Soviet armed forces.

A Kosmos-2M 63S1M carrier rocket was used to launch Kosmos 93 into low Earth orbit. The launch took place from Site 86/1 at Kapustin Yar. The launch occurred at 05:45 GMT on 19 October 1965, and resulted in the successful insertion of the satellite into orbit. Upon reaching orbit, the satellite was assigned its Kosmos designation, and received the International Designator 1965-084A. The North American Air Defense Command assigned it the catalogue number 01629.

Kosmos 93 was the first of four DS-U2-V satellites to be launched. It was operated in an orbit with a perigee of 216 kilometres (134 mi), an apogee of 513 kilometres (319 mi), an 48.4° of inclination, and an orbital period of 91.7 minutes. On 3 January 1966, it decayed from orbit and reentered the atmosphere.

== See also ==
- 1965 in spaceflight
