= Kosmos 95 =

Soviet satellite launched in 1965

- Mission type: Technology
- COSPAR ID: 1965-088A
- SATCAT no.: 01706
- Mission duration: 75 days

Spacecraft properties
- Spacecraft type: DS-U2-V
- Manufacturer: Yuzhnoye
- Launch mass: 325 kg

Start of mission
- Launch date: 4 November 1965; 05:31:00 GMT
- Rocket: Kosmos-2M 63S1M
- Launch site: Kapustin Yar, Site 86/1
- Contractor: Yuzhnoye

End of mission
- Decay date: 18 January 1966

Orbital parameters
- Reference system: Geocentric
- Regime: Low Earth
- Perigee altitude: 211 km
- Apogee altitude: 521 km
- Inclination: 48.4°
- Period: 91.7 minutes
- Epoch: 4 November 1965

Kosmos 95 (Russian: Космос 95 meaning Cosmos 95), also known as DS-U2-V No.2, was a Soviet satellite which was launched in 1965 as part of the Dnepropetrovsk Sputnik programme. The spacecraft weighed 325 kilograms (717 lb), and was built by the Yuzhnoye Design Office, and was used to conduct classified technology development experiments for the Soviet armed forces.

A Kosmos-2M 63S1M carrier rocket was used to launch Kosmos 95 into low Earth orbit. The launch took place from Site 86/1 at Kapustin Yar. The launch occurred at 05:31 GMT on 4 November 1965, and resulted in the successful insertion of the satellite into orbit. Upon reaching orbit, the satellite was assigned its Kosmos designation, and received the International Designator 1965-088A. The North American Air Defense Command assigned it the catalogue number 01706.

Kosmos 95 was the second of four DS-U2-V satellites to be launched. It was operated in an orbit with a perigee of 211 kilometres (131 mi), an apogee of 521 kilometres (324 mi), an inclination of 48.4°, and an orbital period of 91.7 minutes. On 18 January 1966, it decayed from orbit and reentered the atmosphere.

== See also ==
- 1965 in spaceflight
