= 1965 in spaceflight (April–June) =

This is a list of spaceflights launched between April and June 1965. For launches in the rest of the year, see 1965 in spaceflight (January–March), 1965 in spaceflight (July–September) and 1965 in spaceflight (October–December). For an overview of the whole year, see 1965 in spaceflight.

== Orbital launches ==
- ← Jan
- Feb
- Mar
- Apr
- May
- Jun
- Jul
- Aug
- Sep
- Oct
- Nov
- Dec →

Date and time (UTC)	Rocket	Flight number	Launch site		LSP	
Date and time (UTC)	Payload (⚀ = CubeSat)	Operator	Orbit	Function	Decay (UTC)	Outcome
Date and time (UTC)	Remarks					
=== April ===
3 April; 21:25	(United States) Atlas SLV-3 Agena-D		(United States) Vandenberg PALC-2-4		(United States) US Air Force	
3 April; 21:25	(United States) SNAPSHOT (OPS 4682)	US Air Force	Low Earth	Technology	In orbit	Successful
3 April; 21:25	(United States) SECOR-4 (EGRS-4)	US Army	Low Earth	Geodesy	In orbit	Successful
3 April; 21:25	SNAPSHOT carried prototype nuclear reactor and secondary experiment which failed within an hour of activation, spacecraft operated for 43 days.					
6 April; 23:47:50	(United States) Delta D	D030	(United States) Cape Canaveral LC-17A		(United States) NASA	
6 April; 23:47:50	(United States) Intelsat I F1 (Early Bird)	Intelsat	Geosynchronous	Communications	In orbit	Successful
6 April; 23:47:50	First commercial geosynchronous communications satellite, ceased operations on 31 March 1971, final flight of Delta D.					
10 April	(Soviet Union) Molniya		(Soviet Union) Baikonur Site 1/5		(Soviet Union)	
10 April	(Soviet Union) Luna E-6 №8		Intended: Highly elliptical	Lunar lander	10 April	Launch failure
10 April	Third stage engine failure due to tank depressurisation, failed to orbit.					
23 April; 01:55	(Soviet Union) Molniya		(Soviet Union) Baikonur Site 1/5		(Soviet Union)	
23 April; 01:55	(Soviet Union) Molniya-1 1 (Molniya-1 3L)		Molniya	Communications	16 August 1979	Successful
17 April; 09:50	(Soviet Union) Voskhod		(Soviet Union) Baikonur Site 31/6		(Soviet Union)	
17 April; 09:50	(Soviet Union) Kosmos 65 (Zenit-4 №6)	GRU	Low Earth	Optical imaging	25 April	Successful
28 April; 20:17	(United States) Atlas SLV-3 Agena-D		(United States) Vandenberg PALC-2-4		(United States) US Air Force	
28 April; 20:17	(United States) OPS 4983 (KH-7 17/AFP-206)	US Air Force/NRO	Low Earth	Optical imaging	3 May	Successful
28 April; 20:17	(United States) OPS 6717 (Pundit 4/P-11 4401)	US Air Force/NRO	Low Earth	ELINT	31 October 1969	Successful
29 April; 14:17:00	(United States) Scout X-4		(United States) Wallops Island LA-3A		(United States) NASA	
29 April; 14:17:00	(United States) Explorer 27 (BE-C)	NASA	Low Earth	Ionospheric/Geodesy	20 July 1973	Successful
29 April; 21:44:56	(United States) Thrust Augmented Thor SLV-2A Agena-D		(United States) Vandenberg PALC-1-1		(United States) US Air Force	
29 April; 21:44:56	(United States) OPS 5023 (KH-4A 19/1019)	US Air Force/NRO	Low Earth	Optical imaging	26 May	Successful
29 April; 21:44:56	(United States) SRV 626	US Air Force/NRO	Low Earth	Film return	May	Successful
29 April; 21:44:56	(United States) SRV 627	US Air Force/NRO	Low Earth	Film return	8 June	Spacecraft failure
29 April; 21:44:56	Second SRV failed to deorbit.					
← Jan; Feb; Mar; Apr; May; Jun; Jul; Aug; Sep; Oct; Nov; Dec →; === May ===
6 May; 15:00:03	(United States) Titan IIIA		(United States) Cape Canaveral LC-20		(United States) US Air Force	
6 May; 15:00:03	(United States) LES-2	Lincoln	Highly elliptical	Technology	In orbit	Successful
6 May; 15:00:03	(United States) LCS-1	Lincoln	Medium Earth	Radar calibration	In orbit	Successful
6 May; 15:00:03	LES-2 used Star-13A motor used raise orbit from MEO. Final flight of Titan IIIA.					
7 May; 09:50	(Soviet Union) Vostok-2		(Soviet Union) Baikonur Site 31/6		(Soviet Union)	
7 May; 09:50	(Soviet Union) Kosmos 66 (Zenit-2 №27)	GRU	Low Earth	Optical imaging	15 May	Spacecraft failure
7 May; 09:50	Parachute failed to deploy.					
9 May; 07:49:37	(Soviet Union) Molniya (M)		(Soviet Union) Baikonur Site 1/5		(Soviet Union)	
9 May; 07:49:37	(Soviet Union) Luna 5 (Ye-6 №10)		Highly elliptical	Lunar lander	12 May; 19:10	Spacecraft failure
9 May; 07:49:37	Retrorockets malfunctioned, spacecraft crashed on landing.					
18 May; 18:02:18	(United States) Thrust Augmented Thor SLV-2A Agena-D		(United States) Vandenberg LC-75-3-4		(United States) US Air Force	
18 May; 18:02:18	(United States) OPS 8431 (KH-4A 20/1021)	US Air Force/NRO	Low Earth	Optical imaging	15 June	Successful
18 May; 18:02:18	(United States) SRV 674	US Air Force/NRO	Low Earth	Film return	May	Successful
18 May; 18:02:18	(United States) SRV 670	US Air Force/NRO	Low Earth	Film return	May/June	Successful
18 May; 18:02:18	Aft camera shut down prematurely.					
20 May; 16:30:53	(United States) Thor LV-2D Burner-1		(United States) Vandenberg LC-4300B-6		(United States) US Air Force	
20 May; 16:30:53	(United States) OPS 8386 (DSAP-3 F1/DAPP 12)	US Air Force	Sun-synchronous	Weather	9 March 2012	Successful
20 May; 16:30:53	Maiden flight of Thor LV-2D Burner-1.					
25 May; 07:35:01	(United States) Saturn I		(United States) Cape Canaveral LC-37B		(United States) NASA	
25 May; 07:35:01	(United States) Apollo BP-26	NASA	Low Earth	Technology	8 July 1989	Successful
25 May; 07:35:01	(United States) Pegasus 2	NASA	Low Earth	Micrometeoroids	3 November 1979	Successful
25 May; 07:35:01	Boilerplate test of Apollo spacecraft, Pegasus ceased operations on 29 August 1968.					
25 May; 10:48	(Soviet Union) Voskhod		(Soviet Union) Baikonur Site 31/6		(Soviet Union)	
25 May; 10:48	(Soviet Union) Kosmos 67 (Zenit-4 №7)	GRU	Low Earth	Optical imaging	2 June	Successful
27 May; 19:30	(United States) Atlas SLV-3 Agena-D		(United States) Vandenberg PALC-2-4		(United States) US Air Force	
27 May; 19:30	(United States) OPS 5236 (KH-7 18/AFP-206)	US Air Force/NRO	Low Earth	Optical imaging	1 June	Successful
28 May; 02:54:56	(United States) Atlas D OV1		(United States) Vandenberg ABRES-B-3		(United States) US Air Force	
28 May; 02:54:56		US Air Force	Suborbital	REV test	28 May	Launch failure
28 May; 02:54:56	(United States) OV1-3	US Air Force	Intended: Low Earth	Radiation	28 May	Launch failure
28 May; 02:54:56	Rocket exploded two minutes after launch.					
29 May; 12:00:00	(United States) Delta C	D031	(United States) Cape Canaveral LC-17B		(United States) NASA	
29 May; 12:00:00	(United States) Explorer 28 (IMP-3/IMP-C)	NASA	Highly elliptical	Magnetospheric	5 July 1968	Successful
29 May; 12:00:00	Ceased operations on 11 May 1967					
← Jan; Feb; Mar; Apr; May; Jun; Jul; Aug; Sep; Oct; Nov; Dec →; === June ===
3 June; 15:15:59	(United States) Titan II GLV		(United States) Cape Canaveral LC-19		(United States) US Air Force	
3 June; 15:15:59	(United States) Gemini IV	NASA	Low Earth	Technology	7 June; 17:12:11	Successful
3 June; 15:15:59	Carried two astronauts, Ed White became the first American to perform an EVA.					
8 June; 07:40	(Soviet Union) Molniya-M		(Soviet Union) Baikonur Site 1/5		(Soviet Union)	
8 June; 07:40	(Soviet Union) Luna 6 (Ye-6 №7)		Highly elliptical Later: Heliocentric	Lunar lander	In orbit	Spacecraft failure
8 June; 07:40	Engine failed to cut off after course correction; spacecraft ended up in heliocentric orbit.					
9 June; 21:58:16	(United States) Thrust Augmented Thor SLV-2A Agena-D		(United States) Vandenberg LC-75-3-5		(United States) US Air Force	
9 June; 21:58:16	(United States) OPS 8425 (KH-4A 21/1020)	US Air Force/NRO	Low Earth	Optical imaging	22 June	Partial spacecraft failure
9 June; 21:58:16	(United States) SRV 672	US Air Force/NRO	Low Earth	Film return	June	Successful
9 June; 21:58:16	(United States) SRV 672	US Air Force/NRO	Low Earth	Film return	June	Successful
9 June; 21:58:16	Attitude control problems resulted in second SRV being returned early.					
15 June; 10:04	(Soviet Union) Vostok-2		(Soviet Union) Baikonur Site 31/6		(Soviet Union)	
15 June; 10:04	(Soviet Union) Kosmos 68 (Zenit-2 №28)	GRU	Low Earth	Optical imaging	23 June	Successful
18 June; 14:00:04	(United States) Titan IIIC	3C-7	(United States) Cape Canaveral LC-40		(United States) US Air Force	
18 June; 14:00:04	(United States) Transtage with ballast	US Air Force	Low Earth	Test flight	21 June	Successful
18 June; 14:00:04	Maiden flight of Titan IIIC.					
24 June; 22:35:29	(United States) Thor DSV-2A Ablestar		(United States) Vandenberg LC-75-1-1		(United States) US Air Force	
24 June; 22:35:29	(United States) OPS 8480 (Transit O-4/NNS 30040)	US Navy	Low Earth	Navigation	In orbit	Partial spacecraft failure
24 June; 22:35:29	Failed within eleven months due to poorly manufactured components.					
25 June; 09:50	(Soviet Union) Voskhod		(Soviet Union) Baikonur Site 1/5		(Soviet Union)	
25 June; 09:50	(Soviet Union) Kosmos 69 (Zenit-4 №8)	GRU	Low Earth	Optical imaging	3 July	Successful
25 June; 19:30	(United States) Atlas SLV-3 Agena-D		(United States) Vandenberg PALC-2-4		(United States) US Air Force	
25 June; 19:30	(United States) OPS 5501 (KH-7 19/AFP-206)	US Air Force/NRO	Low Earth	Optical imaging	30 June	Successful
25 June; 19:30	(United States) OPS 6749 (Fanion 1 / Tripos 1, P-11 4402)	US Air Force/NRO	Low Earth	ELINT	22 August 1968	Successful
← Jan; Feb; Mar; Apr; May; Jun; Jul; Aug; Sep; Oct; Nov; Dec →
For flights after 30 June, see 1965 in spaceflight (July-September)

== Suborbital launches ==
- ← Jan
- Feb
- Mar
- Apr
- May
- Jun
- Jul
- Aug
- Sep
- Oct
- Nov
- Dec →

Date and time (UTC)	Rocket	Flight number	Launch site		LSP	
Date and time (UTC)	Payload (⚀ = CubeSat)	Operator	Orbit	Function	Decay (UTC)	Outcome
Date and time (UTC)	Remarks					
=== April ===
1 April; 02:07	(United States) Nike-Apache		(United States) Wallops Island		(United States) NASA	
1 April; 02:07		NASA	Suborbital	Aeronomy	1 April	Successful
1 April; 02:07	Apogee: 139 kilometres (86 mi)					
2 April; 13:22	(United States) Nike-Apache		(United States) USS Croatan, PO-11 LP-31		(United States) NASA	
2 April; 13:22		New Hampshire	Suborbital	Plasma research	2 April	Successful
2 April; 13:22	Apogee: 200 kilometres (120 mi)					
3 April; 12:54	(United Kingdom) Skylark-7		(Italy) Salto di Quirra		(Europe) ESRO	
3 April; 12:54		UCL	Suborbital	Ionospheric	3 April	Successful
3 April; 12:54	Apogee: 172 kilometres (107 mi)					
3 April; 21:59	(United States) Nike-Apache		(Canada) Fort Churchill		(United States) NASA	
3 April; 21:59		Rice	Suborbital	Plasma research	3 April	Successful
3 April; 21:59	Apogee: 205 kilometres (127 mi)					
4 April; 16:06:35	(United States) Nike-Apache		(United States) USS Croatan, PO-11 LP-32		(United States) NASA	
4 April; 16:06:35		Michigan	Suborbital	Aeronomy	4 April	Successful
4 April; 16:06:35	Apogee: 139 kilometres (86 mi)					
5 April; 07:20	(United States) Thor DSV-2J		(United States) Johnston LE-2		(United States) US Air Force	
5 April; 07:20		US Air Force	Suborbital	ABM test	5 April	Successful
5 April; 07:20	Apogee: 826 kilometres (513 mi)					
5 April; 13:45:53	(United States) Nike-Apache		(United States) USS Croatan, PO-11 LP-33		(United States) NASA	
5 April; 13:45:53		Urbana-Champaign	Suborbital	Ionospheric	5 April	Successful
5 April; 13:45:53	Apogee: 177 kilometres (110 mi)					
5 April; 19:42	(United States) Nike-Apache		(United States) USS Croatan, PO-11 LP-34		(United States) NASA	
5 April; 19:42		New Hampshire	Suborbital	Plasma research	5 April	Successful
5 April; 19:42	Apogee: 200 kilometres (120 mi)					
6 April; 13:34:59	(United States) SM-65D Atlas		(United States) Vandenberg LC-576B-1		(United States) US Air Force	
6 April; 13:34:59		US Air Force	Suborbital	REV Test	6 April	Successful
6 April; 13:34:59	Apogee: 1,800 kilometres (1,100 mi)					
6 April; 16:34:05	(United States) Nike-Apache		(United States) USS Croatan, PO-11 LP-35		(United States) NASA	
6 April; 16:34:05		Michigan	Suborbital	Aeronomy	6 April	Successful
6 April; 16:34:05	Apogee: 142 kilometres (88 mi)					
9 April; 01:01	(United Kingdom) Skylark-7C		(Australia) Woomera LA-2		(United Kingdom) (Australia) RAE/WRE	
9 April; 01:01		CULH	Suborbital	Solar	9 April	Successful
9 April; 01:01	Apogee: 160 kilometres (99 mi)					
9 April; 18:10:37	(United States) XRM-91 Blue Scout Jr		(United States) Cape Canaveral LC-18A		(United States) US Air Force	
9 April; 18:10:37		US Air Force	Suborbital	Magnetospheric	9 April	Successful
9 April; 18:10:37	Apogee: 25,422 kilometres (15,796 mi)					
9 April; 19:18:15	(United States) Nike-Apache		(United States) USS Croatan, PO-11 LP-36		(United States) NASA	
9 April; 19:18:15		Urbana-Champaign	Suborbital	Ionospheric	9 April	Successful
9 April; 19:18:15	Apogee: 191 kilometres (119 mi)					
9 April; 20:26:10	(United States) Nike-Apache		(United States) USS Croatan, PO-11 LP-37		(United States) NASA	
9 April; 20:26:10		Michigan	Suborbital	Aeronomy	9 April	Successful
9 April; 20:26:10	Apogee: 147 kilometres (91 mi)					
10 April; 08:10	(United States) LGM-30B Minuteman IB		(United States) Vandenberg LF-09		(United States) Strategic Air Command	
10 April; 08:10		Strategic Air Command	Suborbital	Missile test	10 April	Successful
10 April; 08:10	Apogee: 1,300 kilometres (810 mi)					
12 April; 14:47	(United States) Aerobee-150 (Hi)		(United States) White Sands LC-35		(United States) NASA	
12 April; 14:47		NASA	Suborbital	Solar	12 April	Successful
12 April; 14:47	Apogee: 201 kilometres (125 mi)					
12 April; 17:14:02	(United States) Nike-Apache		(United States) USS Croatan, PO-11 LP-38		(United States) NASA	
12 April; 17:14:02		Urbana-Champaign	Suborbital	Ionospheric	12 April	Successful
12 April; 17:14:02	Apogee: 187 kilometres (116 mi)					
12 April; 18:37	(United States) Nike-Iroquois		(United States) Eglin		(United States) US Air Force	
12 April; 18:37		AFCRL	Suborbital	Test flight	12 April	Successful
12 April; 18:37	Apogee: 143 kilometres (89 mi)					
12 April	(Soviet Union) R-16U		(Soviet Union) Baikonur Site 60/6		(Soviet Union) RVSN	
12 April		RVSN	Suborbital	Missile test	12 April	Successful
12 April	Apogee: 1,210 kilometres (750 mi)					
13 April; 04:05:06	(United States) Nike-Apache		(United States) USS Croatan, PO-11 LP-39		(United States) NASA	
13 April; 04:05:06		Michigan	Suborbital	Aeronomy	13 April	Successful
13 April; 04:05:06	Apogee: 150 kilometres (93 mi)					
13 April; 16:00:09	(United States) Nike-Apache		(United States) USS Croatan, PO-11 LP-39		(United States) NASA	
13 April; 16:00:09		Michigan	Suborbital	Aeronomy	13 April	Successful
13 April; 16:00:09	Apogee: 146 kilometres (91 mi)					
13 April; 17:10	(United States) Nike-Apache		(United States) USS Croatan, PO-11 LP-39		(United States) NASA	
13 April; 17:10		New Hampshire	Suborbital	Plasma research	13 April	Successful
13 April; 17:10	Apogee: 200 kilometres (120 mi)					
13 April; 19:06	(United States) Nike-Apache		(United States) USS Croatan, PO-11 LP-40		(United States) NASA	
13 April; 19:06		Michigan	Suborbital	Aeronomy	13 April	Successful
13 April; 19:06	Apogee: 200 kilometres (120 mi)					
13 April; 21:00	(United States) LGM-30B Minuteman IB		(United States) Vandenberg LF-02		(United States) Strategic Air Command	
13 April; 21:00		Strategic Air Command	Suborbital	Missile test	13 April	Successful
13 April; 21:00	Apogee: 1,300 kilometres (810 mi)					
13 April; 21:00	(United States) LGM-30B Minuteman IB		(United States) Vandenberg LF-08		(United States) Strategic Air Command	
13 April; 21:00		Strategic Air Command	Suborbital	Missile test	13 April	Successful
13 April; 21:00	Apogee: 1,300 kilometres (810 mi)					
14 April; 06:09:19	(United States) UGM-27 Polaris A1		(United States) Cape Canaveral LC-29A		(United States) US Navy	
14 April; 06:09:19		US Navy	Suborbital	Missile test	14 April	Launch failure
14 April; 06:09:19	Apogee: 1 kilometre (0.62 mi)					
14 April; 14:39	(United States) Journeyman		(United States) Wallops Island		(United States) NASA	
14 April; 14:39		Minnesota	Suborbital	Plasma research	14 April	Successful
14 April; 14:39	Apogee: 1,660 kilometres (1,030 mi)					
15 April; 10:45	(United States) Aerobee-150 (Hi)		(United States) White Sands LC-35		(United States) NASA	
15 April; 10:45		Minnesota	Suborbital	Aeronomy	15 April	Successful
15 April; 10:45	Apogee: 198 kilometres (123 mi)					
15 April; 16:00:04	(United States) Nike-Apache		(United States) USS Croatan, PO-11 LP-41		(United States) NASA	
15 April; 16:00:04		Michigan	Suborbital	Aeronomy	15 April	Successful
15 April; 16:00:04	Apogee: 140 kilometres (87 mi)					
15 April; 18:02	(United States) Nike-Apache		(United States) USS Croatan, PO-11 LP-42		(United States) NASA	
15 April; 18:02		Michigan	Suborbital	Aeronomy	15 April	Successful
15 April; 18:02	Apogee: 200 kilometres (120 mi)					
16 April; 19:19:55	(United States) LGM-25C Titan II		(United States) Vandenberg LC-395C		(United States) Strategic Air Command	
16 April; 19:19:55		Strategic Air Command	Suborbital	Missile test	16 April	Successful
16 April; 19:19:55	Apogee: 1,300 kilometres (810 mi)					
16 April	(Soviet Union) R-12 Dvina		(Soviet Union) Makat		(Soviet Union) MVS	
16 April		MVS	Suborbital	Missile test	16 April	Successful
16 April	Apogee: 402 kilometres (250 mi)					
19 April; 02:20	(Soviet Union) UR-100		(Soviet Union) Baikonur Site 130		(Soviet Union) RVSN	
19 April; 02:20		RVSN	Suborbital	Missile test	19 April	Successful
19 April; 02:20	Apogee: 1,000 kilometres (620 mi)					
20 April; 15:40	(United States) Aerobee-150 (Hi)		(United States) White Sands LC-35		(United States) NRL	
20 April; 15:40		NRL	Suborbital	Solar	20 April	Successful
20 April; 15:40	Apogee: 201 kilometres (125 mi)					
21 April; 11:02	(United Kingdom) Black Knight 301		(Australia) Woomera LA-5		(United Kingdom) RAE	
21 April; 11:02		UCL	Suborbital	REV test Ionospheric	21 April	Successful
21 April; 11:02	Apogee: 651 kilometres (405 mi)					
22 April; 05:14	(Canada) Black Brant III		(Canada) Fort Churchill		(Canada) NRCC	
22 April; 05:14		NRCC	Suborbital	Auroral; Ionospheric	22 April	Successful
22 April; 05:14	Apogee: 136 kilometres (85 mi)					
22 April	(Soviet Union) R-5A Pobeda		(Soviet Union) Kapustin Yar		(Soviet Union) RVSN	
22 April		RVSN	Suborbital	Missile test	22 April	Successful
22 April	Apogee: 500 kilometres (310 mi)					
23 April; 03:01	(United States) Nike-Cajun		(United States) Wallops Island		(United States) NASA	
23 April; 03:01		NASA	Suborbital	Aeronomy	23 April	Successful
23 April; 03:01	Apogee: 128 kilometres (80 mi)					
23 April; 04:02	(United States) Nike-Apache		(United States) Wallops Island		(United States) NASA	
23 April; 04:02		NASA	Suborbital	Aeronomy	23 April	Successful
23 April; 04:02	Apogee: 145 kilometres (90 mi)					
24 April; 05:15	(United States) Aerobee-150 (Hi)		(United States) White Sands LC-35		(United States) NASA	
24 April; 05:15		NASA	Suborbital	UV Astronomy	24 April	Launch failure
24 April; 05:15	Apogee: 82 kilometres (51 mi)					
24 April; 10:00:25	(Soviet Union) R-17 Elbrus		(Soviet Union) Kapustin Yar		(Soviet Union) MVS	
24 April; 10:00:25		MVS	Suborbital	Missile test	24 April	Successful
24 April; 10:00:25	Apogee: 250 kilometres (160 mi)					
24 April	(Soviet Union) R-12 Dvina		(Soviet Union) Makat		(Soviet Union) MVS	
24 April		MVS	Suborbital	Missile test	24 April	Successful
24 April	Apogee: 402 kilometres (250 mi)					
24 April	(Soviet Union) R-5A Pobeda		(Soviet Union) Kapustin Yar		(Soviet Union) RVSN	
24 April		RVSN	Suborbital	Missile test	24 April	Successful
24 April	Apogee: 500 kilometres (310 mi)					
26 April; 14:13	(Soviet Union) R-5A Pobeda		(Soviet Union) Kapustin Yar		(Soviet Union) RVSN	
26 April; 14:13		RVSN	Suborbital	Missile test	26 April	Successful
26 April; 14:13	Apogee: 500 kilometres (310 mi)					
26 April	(Soviet Union) R-16U		(Soviet Union) Baikonur Site 41/4		(Soviet Union) RVSN	
26 April		RVSN	Suborbital	Missile test	26 April	Successful
26 April	Apogee: 1,210 kilometres (750 mi)					
27 April; 05:00	(Soviet Union) R-36		(Soviet Union) Baikonur Site 140/18		(Soviet Union) RVSN	
27 April; 05:00		RVSN	Suborbital	Missile test	27 April	Successful
27 April; 05:00	Apogee: 870 kilometres (540 mi)					
27 April; 06:30	(United States) Aerobee-150 (Hi)		(United States) White Sands LC-35		(United States) NRL	
27 April; 06:30		NRL	Suborbital	XR astronomy	27 April	Successful
27 April; 06:30	Apogee: 193 kilometres (120 mi)					
28 April; 22:27	(United States) Nike-Cajun		(United States) Point Barrow		(United States) NASA	
28 April; 22:27		NASA	Suborbital	Aeronomy	28 April	Successful
28 April; 22:27	Apogee: 100 kilometres (62 mi)					
28 April; 23:57	(France) Centaure 1		(India) Thumba		(India) ISRO	
28 April; 23:57		NASA	Suborbital	Aeronomy; Ionospheric	28 April	Successful
28 April; 23:57	Apogee: 150 kilometres (93 mi)					
28 April	(Soviet Union) R-16U		(Soviet Union) Baikonur Site 41/4		(Soviet Union) RVSN	
28 April		RVSN	Suborbital	Missile test	28 April	Launch failure
29 April; 09:03	(United Kingdom) Skylark-7C		(Australia) Woomera LA-2		(United Kingdom) (Australia) RAE/WRE	
29 April; 09:03		UCL/QUB	Suborbital	Aeronomy	29 April	Launch failure
29 April; 09:03	Apogee: 140 kilometres (87 mi)					
29 April; 11:09	(United Kingdom) Skylark-7		(Australia) Woomera LA-2		(United Kingdom) (Australia) RAE/WRE	
29 April; 11:09		UCL	Suborbital	Aeronomy	29 April	Successful
29 April; 11:09	Apogee: 136 kilometres (85 mi)					
29 April; 12:25	(United Kingdom) Skylark-7		(Australia) Woomera LA-2		(United Kingdom) (Australia) RAE/WRE	
29 April; 12:25		UCL	Suborbital	Aeronomy	29 April	Successful
29 April; 12:25	Apogee: 132 kilometres (82 mi)					
29 April; 13:56	(United Kingdom) Skylark-7		(Australia) Woomera LA-2		(United Kingdom) (Australia) RAE/WRE	
29 April; 13:56		UCL	Suborbital	Aeronomy	29 April	Successful
29 April; 13:56	Apogee: 124 kilometres (77 mi)					
29 April; 16:19	(United Kingdom) Skylark-7		(Australia) Woomera LA-2		(United Kingdom) (Australia) RAE/WRE	
29 April; 16:19		UCL	Suborbital	Aeronomy	29 April	Successful
29 April; 16:19	Apogee: 140 kilometres (87 mi)					
29 April; 17:32	(United States) Nike-Cajun		(Pakistan) Sonmiani		(United States) NASA	
29 April; 17:32		SUPA	Suborbital	Aeronomy	29 April	Successful
29 April; 17:32	Apogee: 100 kilometres (62 mi)					
29 April; 17:56	(United Kingdom) Skylark-7		(Australia) Woomera LA-2		(United Kingdom) (Australia) RAE/WRE	
29 April; 17:56		UCL	Suborbital	Aeronomy	29 April	Successful
29 April; 17:56	Apogee: 135 kilometres (84 mi)					
29 April; 20:40	(United Kingdom) Skylark-7C		(Australia) Woomera LA-2		(United Kingdom) (Australia) RAE/WRE	
29 April; 20:40		UCL	Suborbital	Aeronomy	29 April	Successful
29 April; 20:40	Apogee: 175 kilometres (109 mi)					
30 April; 19:05:07	(United States) LGM-25C Titan II		(United States) Vandenberg LC-395D		(United States) Strategic Air Command	
30 April; 19:05:07		Strategic Air Command	Suborbital	Missile test	30 April	Successful
30 April; 19:05:07	Apogee: 1,300 kilometres (810 mi)					
30 April; 22:00	(United States) LGM-30B Minuteman IB		(United States) Vandenberg LF-03		(United States) Strategic Air Command	
30 April; 22:00		Strategic Air Command	Suborbital	Missile test	30 April	Successful
30 April; 22:00	Apogee: 1,300 kilometres (810 mi)					
April	(United States) Nike-Apache		(United States) White Sands		(United States) US Army	
April		US Army	Suborbital	Target	April	Successful
April	Apogee: 100 kilometres (62 mi)					
=== May ===
1 May; 23:43	(France) Centaure 1		(India) Thumba		(India) ISRO	
1 May; 23:43		NASA	Suborbital	Ionospheric	1 May	Successful
1 May; 23:43	Apogee: 140 kilometres (87 mi)					
3 May; 18:23	(United States) Nike-Cajun		(United States) Wallops Island		(United States) NASA	
3 May; 18:23		NASA	Suborbital	Aeronomy	3 May	Successful
3 May; 18:23	Apogee: 100 kilometres (62 mi)					
4 May; 05:54	(United States) Nike-Cajun		(United States) Wallops Island		(United States) NASA	
4 May; 05:54		NASA	Suborbital	Test flight	4 May	Successful
4 May; 05:54	Apogee: 110 kilometres (68 mi)					
4 May; 07:30	(United States) Aerobee-150 (Hi)		(United States) White Sands LC-35		(United States) NRL	
4 May; 07:30		NRL	Suborbital	IR Astronomy	4 May	Launch failure
4 May; 07:30	Apogee: 17 kilometres (11 mi)					
5 May; 03:23	(United States) Aerobee-150 (Hi)		(United States) Wallops Island		(United States) NASA	
5 May; 03:23		NASA	Suborbital	UV Astronomy	5 May	Successful
5 May; 03:23	Apogee: 145 kilometres (90 mi)					
8 May; 01:59:59	(United States) LGM-30F Minuteman II		(United States) Cape Canaveral LC-32B		(United States) US Air Force	
8 May; 01:59:59		US Air Force	Suborbital	Missile test	8 May	Successful
8 May; 01:59:59	Apogee: 1,300 kilometres (810 mi)					
10 May; 07:30	(United States) HAD		(Australia) North Carnarvon		(Australia) WRE	
10 May; 07:30		WRE	Suborbital	Aeronomy	10 May	Successful
10 May; 07:30	Apogee: 115 kilometres (71 mi)					
10 May; 10:20	(United States) HAD		(Australia) North Carnarvon		(Australia) WRE	
10 May; 10:20		WRE	Suborbital	Aeronomy	10 May	Successful
10 May; 10:20	Apogee: 116 kilometres (72 mi)					
10 May; 13:20	(United States) HAD		(Australia) North Carnarvon		(Australia) WRE	
10 May; 13:20		WRE	Suborbital	Aeronomy	10 May	Successful
10 May; 13:20	Apogee: 116 kilometres (72 mi)					
10 May; 16:20	(United States) HAD		(Australia) North Carnarvon		(Australia) WRE	
10 May; 16:20		WRE	Suborbital	Aeronomy	10 May	Successful
10 May; 16:20	Apogee: 109 kilometres (68 mi)					
10 May; 19:20	(United States) HAD		(Australia) North Carnarvon		(Australia) WRE	
10 May; 19:20		WRE	Suborbital	Aeronomy	10 May	Successful
10 May; 19:20	Apogee: 115 kilometres (71 mi)					
10 May	(United States) LGM-30B Minuteman IB		(United States) Vandenberg LF-09		(United States) Strategic Air Command	
10 May		Strategic Air Command	Suborbital	Missile test	10 May	Successful
10 May	Apogee: 1,300 kilometres (810 mi)					
11 May; 00:45	(United States) HAD		(Australia) North Carnarvon		(Australia) WRE	
11 May; 00:45		WRE	Suborbital	Aeronomy	11 May	Successful
11 May; 00:45	Apogee: 111 kilometres (69 mi)					
11 May; 03:10	(United States) HAD		(Australia) North Carnarvon		(Australia) WRE	
11 May; 03:10		WRE	Suborbital	Aeronomy	11 May	Successful
11 May; 03:10	Apogee: 113 kilometres (70 mi)					
11 May; 08:39	(United States) HAD		(Australia) Woomera LA-2		(Australia) WRE	
11 May; 08:39		WRE	Suborbital	Aeronomy	11 May	Successful
11 May; 08:39	Apogee: 114 kilometres (71 mi)					
11 May; 20:40	(United Kingdom) Skylark-7C		(Australia) Woomera LA-2		(United Kingdom) (Australia) RAE/WRE	
11 May; 20:40		UCL/QUB	Suborbital	Aeronomy	11 May	Successful
11 May; 20:40	Apogee: 181 kilometres (112 mi)					
12 May; 12:30	(Soviet Union) R-12 Dvina		(Soviet Union) Kapustin Yar		(Soviet Union) MVS	
12 May; 12:30		MVS	Suborbital	Missile test	12 May	Successful
12 May; 12:30	Apogee: 402 kilometres (250 mi)					
12 May; 16:02:35	(United States) XRM-91 Blue Scout Jr		(United States) Cape Canaveral LC-18A		(United States) US Air Force	
12 May; 16:02:35		US Air Force	Suborbital	Magnetospheric	12 May	Successful
12 May; 16:02:35	Apogee: 13,586 kilometres (8,442 mi)					
13 May; 16:05	(United Kingdom) Skylark-7C		(Australia) Woomera LA-2		(United Kingdom) (Australia) RAE/WRE	
13 May; 16:05		RSRS	Suborbital	Ionospheric	13 May	Successful
13 May; 16:05	Apogee: 187 kilometres (116 mi)					
13 May	(France) Emeraude VE121		(Algeria) Hammaguira Brigitte		(France) CNES	
13 May		CNES	Suborbital	Missile test	13 May	Successful
13 May	Apogee: 200 kilometres (120 mi)					
18 May; 05:00	(Soviet Union) R-36		(Soviet Union) Baikonur Site 140/18		(Soviet Union) RVSN	
18 May; 05:00		RVSN	Suborbital	Missile test	18 May	Successful
18 May; 05:00	Apogee: 870 kilometres (540 mi)					
18 May	(France) Topaze VE111L		(Algeria) Hammaguira Brigitte		(France) ONERA	
18 May		ONERA	Suborbital	Test flight	18 May	Successful
18 May	Apogee: 100 kilometres (62 mi)					
18 May	(United States) LGM-30B Minuteman IB		(United States) Vandenberg LF-07		(United States) Strategic Air Command	
18 May		Strategic Air Command	Suborbital	Missile test	18 May	Successful
18 May	Apogee: 1,300 kilometres (810 mi)					
19 May; 05:25	(United Kingdom) Skylark-7C		(Australia) Woomera LA-2		(United Kingdom) (Australia) RAE/WRE	
19 May; 05:25		RSRS	Suborbital	Ionospheric; Solar	19 May	Successful
19 May; 05:25	Apogee: 179 kilometres (111 mi)					
19 May; 13:00	(Soviet Union) R-13		(Soviet Union) K-170, Barents Sea		(Soviet Union) RVSN	
19 May; 13:00		RVSN	Suborbital	Missile test	19 May	Successful
19 May; 13:00	Apogee: 150 kilometres (93 mi)					
19 May; 20:11:00	(United States) Javelin		(United States) Wallops Island		(United States) NASA	
19 May; 20:11:00		PSU	Suborbital	Ionospheric	19 May	Successful
19 May; 20:11:00	Apogee: 947 kilometres (588 mi)					
20 May; 03:45	(Soviet Union) UR-100		(Soviet Union) Baikonur		(Soviet Union) RVSN	
20 May; 03:45		RVSN	Suborbital	Missile test	20 May	Launch failure
21 May; 23:53:25	(United States) LGM-25C Titan II		(United States) Vandenberg LC-395B		(United States) Strategic Air Command	
21 May; 23:53:25		Strategic Air Command	Suborbital	Missile test	21 May	Successful
21 May; 23:53:25	Apogee: 1,300 kilometres (810 mi)					
21 May	(France) Topaze VE111L		(Algeria) Hammaguira Brigitte		(France) ONERA	
21 May		ONERA	Suborbital	Test flight	21 May	Successful
21 May	Apogee: 100 kilometres (62 mi)					
22 May; 02:02:01	(United States) Nike-Apache		(United Kingdom) Ascension		(United States) NASA	
22 May; 02:02:01		Michigan	Suborbital	Aeronomy	22 May	Successful
22 May; 02:02:01	Apogee: 147 kilometres (91 mi)					
22 May; 06:29	(Soviet Union) R-16U		(Soviet Union) Baikonur Site 41/3		(Soviet Union) RVSN	
22 May; 06:29		RVSN	Suborbital	Missile test	22 May	Successful
22 May; 06:29	Apogee: 920 kilometres (570 mi)					
22 May; 14:00:00	(United States) Nike-Apache		(United Kingdom) Ascension		(United States) NASA	
22 May; 14:00:00		Michigan	Suborbital	Aeronomy	22 May	Successful
22 May; 14:00:00	Apogee: 158 kilometres (98 mi)					
22 May; 21:55:00	(United States) SM-65D Atlas		(United States) Cape Canaveral LC-12		(United States) NASA	
22 May; 21:55:00	(United States) FIRE 2	NASA	Suborbital	REV Test	22 May	Successful
22 May; 21:55:00	Apogee: 817 kilometres (508 mi)					
24 May; 10:00	(Soviet Union) R-13		(Soviet Union) Project 629 Submarine, Barents Sea		(Soviet Union) RVSN	
24 May; 10:00		RVSN	Suborbital	Missile test	24 May	Successful
24 May; 10:00	Apogee: 150 kilometres (93 mi)					
25 May; 13:00	(Soviet Union) R-13		(Soviet Union) Project 629 Submarine, Barents Sea		(Soviet Union) RVSN	
25 May; 13:00		RVSN	Suborbital	Missile test	25 May	Successful
25 May; 13:00	Apogee: 150 kilometres (93 mi)					
25 May; 23:20	(United States) Exos		(United States) Eglin		(United States) US Air Force	
25 May; 23:20		US Air Force	Suborbital	Ionospheric	25 May	Successful
25 May; 23:20	Apogee: 488 kilometres (303 mi)					
25 May	(United States) HAD		(Australia) Woomera LA-2		(Australia) WRE	
25 May		WRE	Suborbital	Aeronomy	25 May	Successful
25 May	Apogee: 110 kilometres (68 mi)					
25 May	(Soviet Union) R-5A Pobeda		(Soviet Union) Kapustin Yar		(Soviet Union) RVSN	
25 May		RVSN	Suborbital	Missile test	25 May	Successful
25 May	Apogee: 500 kilometres (310 mi)					
26 May; 02:00:00	(United States) LGM-30F Minuteman II		(United States) Cape Canaveral LC-32B		(United States) US Air Force	
26 May; 02:00:00		US Air Force	Suborbital	Missile test	26 May	Successful
26 May; 02:00:00	Apogee: 1,300 kilometres (810 mi)					
26 May; 13:36	(Soviet Union) R-13		(Soviet Union) K-170, Barents Sea		(Soviet Union) RVSN	
26 May; 13:36		RVSN	Suborbital	Missile test	26 May	Successful
26 May; 13:36	Apogee: 150 kilometres (93 mi)					
26 May; 17:30	(Soviet Union) R-17 Elbrus		(Soviet Union) Kapustin Yar		(Soviet Union) MVS	
26 May; 17:30		MVS	Suborbital	Missile test	26 May	Successful
26 May; 17:30	Apogee: 231 kilometres (144 mi)					
26 May; 19:01	(United States) Javelin		(United States) Wallops Island		(United States) NASA	
26 May; 19:01		NASA	Suborbital	Ionospheric	26 May	Launch failure
26 May; 19:01	Apogee: 320 kilometres (200 mi)					
26 May; 23:20	(United States) Exos		(United States) Eglin		(United States) US Air Force	
26 May; 23:20		US Air Force	Suborbital	Ionospheric	26 May	Successful
26 May; 23:20	Apogee: 488 kilometres (303 mi)					
26 May	(United States) MGM-31 Pershing I		(United States) Gilson Butte		(United States) US Army	
26 May		US Army	Suborbital	Missile test	26 May	Successful
26 May	Apogee: 250 kilometres (160 mi)					
26 May	(Soviet Union) R-5A Pobeda		(Soviet Union) Kapustin Yar		(Soviet Union) RVSN	
26 May		RVSN	Suborbital	Missile test	26 May	Successful
26 May	Apogee: 500 kilometres (310 mi)					
27 May; 23:56	(Canada) Black Brant II		(Canada) Fort Churchill		(Canada) NRCC	
27 May; 23:56		DRTE	Suborbital	Ionospheric	27 May	Launch failure
27 May; 23:56	Apogee: 27 kilometres (17 mi)					
27 May	(France) Veronique 61		(Algeria) Hammaguira Blandine		(France) CNES	
27 May		CNRS	Suborbital	Solar	27 May	Launch failure
27 May	Apogee: 70 kilometres (43 mi)					
27 May	(United States) MGM-31 Pershing I		(United States) Gilson Butte		(United States) US Army	
27 May		US Army	Suborbital	Missile test	27 May	Successful
27 May	Apogee: 250 kilometres (160 mi)					
28 May; 02:23	(Soviet Union) R-16U		(Soviet Union) Baikonur Site 60/6		(Soviet Union) RVSN	
28 May; 02:23		RVSN	Suborbital	Missile test	28 May	Successful
28 May; 02:23	Apogee: 743 kilometres (462 mi)					
30 May; 20:00	(United States) Nike-Tomahawk		(New Zealand) Rarotonga		(United States) Sandia	
30 May; 20:00		LASL	Suborbital	Solar	30 May	Successful
30 May; 20:00	Apogee: 270 kilometres (170 mi)					
30 May; 20:00	(United States) Nike-Tomahawk		(New Zealand) Rarotonga		(United States) Sandia	
30 May; 20:00		LASL	Suborbital	Solar	30 May	Successful
30 May; 20:00	Apogee: 270 kilometres (170 mi)					
30 May; 20:00	(United States) Nike-Tomahawk		(New Zealand) Rarotonga		(United States) Sandia	
30 May; 20:00		LASL	Suborbital	Solar	30 May	Successful
30 May; 20:00	Apogee: 270 kilometres (170 mi)					
30 May; 20:00	(United States) Nike-Tomahawk		(New Zealand) Rarotonga		(United States) Sandia	
30 May; 20:00		LASL	Suborbital	Solar	30 May	Successful
30 May; 20:00	Apogee: 270 kilometres (170 mi)					
30 May; 20:00	(United States) Nike-Tomahawk		(New Zealand) Rarotonga		(United States) Sandia	
30 May; 20:00		LASL	Suborbital	Solar	30 May	Successful
30 May; 20:00	Apogee: 270 kilometres (170 mi)					
31 May; 13:30	(Soviet Union) R-13		(Soviet Union) Project 629 Submarine, Barents Sea		(Soviet Union) RVSN	
31 May; 13:30		RVSN	Suborbital	Missile test	31 May	Successful
31 May; 13:30	Apogee: 150 kilometres (93 mi)					
31 May	(France) Rubis		(Algeria) Hammaguira Bacchus		(France) ONERA	
31 May		ONERA	Suborbital	Ionospheric	31 May	Successful
31 May	Apogee: 2,000 kilometres (1,200 mi)					
31 May	(United States) UGM-27 Polaris A2		(United States) USS Nathan Hale, ETR		(United States) US Navy	
31 May		US Navy	Suborbital	Missile test	31 May	Successful
31 May	Apogee: 1,000 kilometres (620 mi)					
31 May	(United States) UGM-27 Polaris A2		(United States) USS Nathan Hale, ETR		(United States) US Navy	
31 May		US Navy	Suborbital	Missile test	31 May	Successful
31 May	Apogee: 1,000 kilometres (620 mi)					
May	(United States) Nike-Javelin		(United States) White Sands		(United States) DASA	
May		DASA	Suborbital	Aeronomy	May	Successful
May	Apogee: 100 kilometres (62 mi)					
May	(United States) Trailblazer 2		(United States) Wallops Island		(United States) NASA	
May		NASA	Suborbital	REV Test	May	Successful
May	Apogee: 300 kilometres (190 mi)					
=== June ===
2 June; 06:22	(United States) Aerobee-150 (Hi)		(United States) White Sands LC-35		(United States) NASA	
2 June; 06:22		Princeton	Suborbital	UV Astronomy	2 June	Successful
2 June; 06:22	Apogee: 181 kilometres (112 mi)					
2 June; 10:19	(United States) Nike-Cajun		(United States) Eglin		(United States) US Air Force	
2 June; 10:19		AFCRL	Suborbital	Aeronomy	2 June	Successful
2 June; 10:19	Apogee: 121 kilometres (75 mi)					
2 June; 10:30	(United States) Nike-Cajun		(United States) Eglin		(United States) US Air Force	
2 June; 10:30		AFCRL	Suborbital	Aeronomy	2 June	Successful
2 June; 10:30	Apogee: 121 kilometres (75 mi)					
2 June; 10:40	(United States) LGM-30B Minuteman IB		(United States) Vandenberg LF-08		(United States) Strategic Air Command	
2 June; 10:40		Strategic Air Command	Suborbital	Missile test	2 June	Successful
2 June; 10:40	Apogee: 1,300 kilometres (810 mi)					
2 June; 14:19	(Canada) Black Brant II		(Canada) Fort Churchill		(Canada) NRCC	
2 June; 14:19		DRTE	Suborbital	Auroral; Ionospheric	2 June	Successful
2 June; 14:19	Apogee: 150 kilometres (93 mi)					
2 June	(United States) MGM-31 Pershing I		(United States) Gilson Butte		(United States) US Army	
2 June		US Army	Suborbital	Missile test	2 June	Successful
2 June	Apogee: 250 kilometres (160 mi)					
3 June; 10:38:09	(United States) SM-65D Atlas		(United States) Vandenberg ABRES-B-2		(United States) US Air Force	
3 June; 10:38:09		US Air Force	Suborbital	REV Test	3 June	Successful
3 June; 10:38:09	Apogee: 1,800 kilometres (1,100 mi)					
3 June; 20:54	(Canada) Martlet 2		Barbados		(Canada) (United States) DND/DoD	
3 June; 20:54		US Army	Suborbital	Ionospheric	3 June	Successful
3 June; 20:54	Apogee: 105 kilometres (65 mi)					
3 June; 23:57	(Canada) Martlet 2		Barbados		(Canada) (United States) DND/DoD	
3 June; 23:57		DND/DoD	Suborbital	Aeronomy	3 June	Successful
3 June; 23:57	Apogee: 114 kilometres (71 mi)					
3 June	(France) Rubis		(Algeria) Hammaguira Bacchus		(France) ONERA	
3 June		ONERA	Suborbital	Ionospheric	3 June	Successful
3 June	Apogee: 2,000 kilometres (1,200 mi)					
4 June; 05:35	(Canada) Martlet 2		Barbados		(Canada) (United States) DND/DoD	
4 June; 05:35		DND/DoD	Suborbital	Aeronomy	4 June	Successful
4 June; 05:35	Apogee: 121 kilometres (75 mi)					
4 June; 07:17	(Canada) Martlet 2		Barbados		(Canada) (United States) DND/DoD	
4 June; 07:17		DND/DoD	Suborbital	Aeronomy	4 June	Successful
4 June; 07:17	Apogee: 107 kilometres (66 mi)					
5 June; 05:40	(France) Rubis		(Algeria) Hammaguira Bacchus		(France) CNES	
5 June; 05:40		CNES	Suborbital	Test flight	5 June	Successful
5 June; 05:40	Apogee: 2,020 kilometres (1,260 mi)					
5 June; 20:20	(Canada) Martlet 2		Barbados		(Canada) (United States) DND/DoD	
5 June; 20:20		US Army	Suborbital	Ionospheric	5 June	Successful
5 June; 20:20	Apogee: 120 kilometres (75 mi)					
5 June; 22:43	(Canada) Martlet 2		Barbados		(Canada) (United States) DND/DoD	
5 June; 22:43		US Army	Suborbital	Ionospheric	5 June	Successful
5 June; 22:43	Apogee: 117 kilometres (73 mi)					
6 June; 17:45	(United States) Honest John-Nike		(United States) Eglin		(United States) DASA	
6 June; 17:45		DASA	Suborbital	Ionospheric	6 June	Successful
6 June; 17:45	Apogee: 100 kilometres (62 mi)					
7 June	(United States) LGM-30B Minuteman IB		(United States) Vandenberg LF-03		(United States) Strategic Air Command	
7 June		Strategic Air Command	Suborbital	Missile test	7 June	Successful
7 June	Apogee: 1,300 kilometres (810 mi)					
8 June; 08:31	(United States) HAD		(Australia) Woomera LA-2		(Australia) WRE	
8 June; 08:31		WRE	Suborbital	Aeronomy	8 June	Successful
8 June; 08:31	Apogee: 106 kilometres (66 mi)					
8 June; 15:17:03	(United States) SM-65D Atlas		(United States) Vandenberg ABRES-A-1		(United States) US Air Force	
8 June; 15:17:03		US Air Force	Suborbital	REV Test	8 June	Successful
8 June; 15:17:03	Apogee: 1,800 kilometres (1,100 mi)					
9 June; 08:32	(United States) HAD		(Australia) Woomera LA-2		(Australia) WRE	
9 June; 08:32		WRE	Suborbital	Aeronomy	9 June	Successful
9 June; 08:32	Apogee: 115 kilometres (71 mi)					
9 June; 16:26:15	(United States) XRM-91 Blue Scout Jr		(United States) Cape Canaveral LC-18A		(United States) US Air Force	
9 June; 16:26:15		US Air Force	Suborbital	Magnetospheric	9 June	Successful
9 June; 16:26:15	Apogee: 17,533 kilometres (10,895 mi)					
10 June; 01:57	(Canada) Martlet 2		Barbados		(Canada) (United States) DND/DoD	
10 June; 01:57		DND/DoD	Suborbital	Aeronomy	10 June	Successful
10 June; 01:57	Apogee: 103 kilometres (64 mi)					
10 June; 03:58	(Canada) Martlet 2		Barbados		(Canada) (United States) DND/DoD	
10 June; 03:58		DND/DoD	Suborbital	Aeronomy	10 June	Successful
10 June; 03:58	Apogee: 103 kilometres (64 mi)					
10 June; 12:26:40	(United States) SM-65D Atlas		(United States) Vandenberg ABRES-A-3		(United States) US Air Force	
10 June; 12:26:40		US Air Force	Suborbital	REV Test	10 June	Successful
10 June; 12:26:40	Apogee: 1,800 kilometres (1,100 mi)					
10 June	(United States) LGM-30B Minuteman IB		(United States) Vandenberg LF-02		(United States) Strategic Air Command	
10 June		Strategic Air Command	Suborbital	Missile test	10 June	Launch failure
10 June	Apogee: 10 kilometres (6.2 mi)					
10 June	(Canada) Martlet 2		Barbados		(Canada) (United States) DND/DoD	
10 June		DND/DoD	Suborbital	Ionospheric	10 June	Successful
10 June	Apogee: 100 kilometres (62 mi)					
11 June; 01:07	(Canada) Martlet 2		Barbados		(Canada) (United States) DND/DoD	
11 June; 01:07		DND/DoD	Suborbital	Aeronomy	11 June	Successful
11 June; 01:07	Apogee: 108 kilometres (67 mi)					
12 June; 15:15	(United States) Honest John-Nike-Nike		(United States) Barking Sands		(United States) Sandia	
12 June; 15:15		LRL	Suborbital	XR astronomy	12 June	Successful
12 June; 15:15	Apogee: 172 kilometres (107 mi)					
12 June; 19:14	(Canada) Black Brant VB		(Canada) Fort Churchill		(Canada) BAL	
12 June; 19:14		BAL	Suborbital	Test flight	12 June	Successful
12 June; 19:14	Apogee: 378 kilometres (235 mi)					
14 June; 09:13:30	(United States) Nike-Apache		(United States) Wallops Island		(United States) NASA	
14 June; 09:13:30		Urbana-Champaign	Suborbital	Ionospheric	14 June	Successful
14 June; 09:13:30	Apogee: 177 kilometres (110 mi)					
14 June; 13:31:30	(United States) LGM-25C Titan II		(United States) Vandenberg LC-395C		(United States) Strategic Air Command	
14 June; 13:31:30		Strategic Air Command	Suborbital	Missile test	14 June	Successful
14 June; 13:31:30	Apogee: 1,300 kilometres (810 mi)					
15 June; 00:00	(France) Tacite		(France) CEL		(France) ONERA	
15 June; 00:00		ONERA	Suborbital	Aeronomy	15 June	Successful
15 June; 00:00	Apogee: 182 kilometres (113 mi)					
15 June	(United States) UGM-27 Polaris A2		(United States) USS John Adams (SSBN-620), ETR		(United States) US Navy	
15 June		US Navy	Suborbital	Missile test	15 June	Successful
15 June	Apogee: 1,000 kilometres (620 mi)					
15 June	(United States) UGM-27 Polaris A2		(United States) USS John Adams, ETR		(United States) US Navy	
15 June		US Navy	Suborbital	Missile test	15 June	Successful
15 June	Apogee: 1,000 kilometres (620 mi)					
16 June; 13:56:04	(United States) UGM-27 Polaris A1		(United States) Cape Canaveral LC-29A		(United States) US Navy	
16 June; 13:56:04		US Navy	Suborbital	Missile test	16 June	Successful
16 June; 13:56:04	Apogee: 650 kilometres (400 mi)					
16 June	(United States) MGM-31 Pershing I		(United States) Gilson Butte		(United States) US Army	
16 June		US Army	Suborbital	Missile test	16 June	Successful
16 June	Apogee: 250 kilometres (160 mi)					
17 June; 21:07	(United States) Aerobee-150 (Hi)		(Canada) Fort Churchill		(United States) NASA	
17 June; 21:07		NASA	Suborbital	Magnetospheric	17 June	Successful
17 June; 21:07	Apogee: 233 kilometres (145 mi)					
17 June; 21:41:00	(United States) Nike-Apache		(United States) Wallops Island		(United States) NASA	
17 June; 21:41:00		Urbana-Champaign	Suborbital	Ionospheric	17 June	Successful
17 June; 21:41:00	Apogee: 177 kilometres (110 mi)					
18 June; 08:06:00	(United States) Honest John-Nike		(United States) Barking Sands		(United States) DASA	
18 June; 08:06:00		DASA	Suborbital	Aeronomy	18 June	
18 June; 08:06:00	Apogee: 100 kilometres (62 mi)					
18 June; 16:12	(Canada) Black Brant VB		(Canada) Fort Churchill		(Canada) BAL	
18 June; 16:12		BAL	Suborbital	Test flight	18 June	Successful
18 June; 16:12	Apogee: 364 kilometres (226 mi)					
18 June; 17:56	(United States) Nike-Apache		(United States) Wallops Island		(United States) NASA	
18 June; 17:56		ESSA	Suborbital	Ionospheric	18 June	Successful
18 June; 17:56	Apogee: 186 kilometres (116 mi)					
18 June; 23:11	(United States) Aerobee 350		(United States) Wallops Island		(United States) NASA	
18 June; 23:11		NASA	Suborbital	Test flight	18 June	Successful
18 June; 23:11	Apogee: 374 kilometres (232 mi)					
19 June	(Soviet Union) UR-100		(Soviet Union) Baikonur		(Soviet Union) RVSN	
19 June		RVSN	Suborbital	Missile test	19 June	Launch failure
22 June; 04:15	(United States) Athena RTV		(United States) Green River Pad 3		(United States) US Air Force	
22 June; 04:15		US Air Force	Suborbital	REV Test	22 June	Launch failure
22 June; 04:15	Apogee: 200 kilometres (120 mi)					
22 June; 06:00:00	(United States) Honest John-Nike		(United States) Barking Sands		(United States) DASA	
22 June; 06:00:00		DASA	Suborbital	Aeronomy	22 June	
22 June; 06:00:00	Apogee: 100 kilometres (62 mi)					
22 June; 07:37	(United States) Athena RTV		(United States) Green River Pad 2		(United States) US Air Force	
22 June; 07:37		US Air Force	Suborbital	REV Test	22 June	Successful
22 June; 07:37	Apogee: 200 kilometres (120 mi)					
22 June	(France) Centaure 1		(Algeria) Hammaguira Bacchus		(France) CNES	
22 June		CNRS	Suborbital	Aeronomy	22 June	Successful
22 June	Apogee: 150 kilometres (93 mi)					
23 June; 01:03	(United States) Nike-Apache		(United States) Wallops Island		(United States) NASA	
23 June; 01:03		GCA	Suborbital	Aeronomy	23 June	Successful
23 June; 01:03	Apogee: 204 kilometres (127 mi)					
23 June; 01:59	(United States) Nike-Apache		(United States) Wallops Island		(United States) NASA	
23 June; 01:59		GCA	Suborbital	Aeronomy	23 June	Successful
23 June; 01:59	Apogee: 191 kilometres (119 mi)					
23 June; 04:00	(United States) Nike-Apache		(United States) Wallops Island		(United States) NASA	
23 June; 04:00		GCA	Suborbital	Aeronomy	23 June	Successful
23 June; 04:00	Apogee: 164 kilometres (102 mi)					
23 June; 08:47	(United States) Nike-Apache		(United States) Wallops Island		(United States) NASA	
23 June; 08:47		GCA	Suborbital	Aeronomy	23 June	Successful
23 June; 08:47	Apogee: 196 kilometres (122 mi)					
23 June; 08:52	(United States) Nike-Apache		(United States) Wallops Island		(United States) NASA	
23 June; 08:52		GCA	Suborbital	Aeronomy	23 June	Successful
23 June; 08:52	Apogee: 143 kilometres (89 mi)					
23 June; 14:32	(United States) Aerobee-150 (Hi)		(United States) White Sands LC-35		(United States) KPNO	
23 June; 14:32		KPNO	Suborbital	Solar	23 June	Successful
23 June; 14:32	Apogee: 186 kilometres (116 mi)					
23 June; 15:47	(United States) Aerobee-150 (Hi)		(Canada) Fort Churchill		(United States) NASA	
23 June; 15:47		NASA	Suborbital	Magnetospheric	23 June	Successful
23 June; 15:47	Apogee: 215 kilometres (134 mi)					
23 June	(United States) LGM-30B Minuteman IB		(United States) Vandenberg LF-09		(United States) Strategic Air Command	
23 June		Strategic Air Command	Suborbital	Missile test	23 June	Successful
23 June	Apogee: 1,300 kilometres (810 mi)					
23 June	(France) Centaure 1		(Algeria) Hammaguira Bacchus		(France) CNES	
23 June		CNRS	Suborbital	Aeronomy	23 June	Successful
23 June	Apogee: 150 kilometres (93 mi)					
23 June	(France) Centaure 1		(France) CERES		(France) CNES	
23 June		CNRS	Suborbital	Aeronomy	23 June	Successful
23 June	Apogee: 150 kilometres (93 mi)					
23 June	(France) Centaure 1		(Algeria) Hammaguira Bacchus		(France) CNES	
23 June		CNRS	Suborbital	Aeronomy	23 June	Successful
23 June	Apogee: 150 kilometres (93 mi)					
23 June	(France) Centaure 1		(France) CERES		(France) CNES	
23 June		CNRS	Suborbital	Aeronomy	23 June	Successful
23 June	Apogee: 150 kilometres (93 mi)					
24 June; 06:07:00	(United States) Honest John-Nike		(United States) Barking Sands		(United States) DASA	
24 June; 06:07:00		DASA	Suborbital	Aeronomy	24 June	
24 June; 06:07:00	Apogee: 100 kilometres (62 mi)					
24 June	(France) Centaure 1		(France) CERES		(France) CNES	
24 June		CNRS	Suborbital	Aeronomy	24 June	Successful
24 June	Apogee: 150 kilometres (93 mi)					
24 June	(France) Centaure 1		(Algeria) Hammaguira Bacchus		(France) CNES	
24 June		CNRS	Suborbital	Aeronomy	24 June	Successful
24 June	Apogee: 150 kilometres (93 mi)					
24 June	(France) Centaure 1		(France) Reggane		(France) CNES	
24 June		CNRS	Suborbital	Aeronomy	24 June	Successful
24 June	Apogee: 150 kilometres (93 mi)					
24 June	(France) Centaure 1		(France) CERES		(France) CNES	
24 June		CNRS	Suborbital	Aeronomy	24 June	Successful
24 June	Apogee: 150 kilometres (93 mi)					
29 June; 12:00	(United States) LGM-30B Minuteman IB		(United States) Vandenberg LF-08		(United States) Strategic Air Command	
29 June; 12:00		Strategic Air Command	Suborbital	Missile test	29 June	Successful
29 June; 12:00	Apogee: 1,300 kilometres (810 mi)					
29 June; 17:45	(United States) Honest John-Nike-Javelin		(United States) Eglin		(United States) US Air Force	
29 June; 17:45		DASA	Suborbital	Aeronomy	29 June	Successful
29 June; 17:45	Apogee: 300 kilometres (190 mi)					
29 June; 19:00	(United States) Aerobee-150 (Hi)		(United States) White Sands LC-35		(United States) NASA	
29 June; 19:00		NASA	Suborbital	Aeronomy	29 June	Successful
29 June; 19:00	Apogee: 195 kilometres (121 mi)					
29 June	(Soviet Union) R-16U		(Soviet Union) Baikonur Site 60/7		(Soviet Union) RVSN	
29 June		RVSN	Suborbital	Missile test	29 June	Launch failure
29 June	(United States) Nike-Javelin		(United States) Eglin		(United States) US Air Force	
29 June		US Air Force	Suborbital	Aeronomy	29 June	Successful
29 June	Apogee: 130 kilometres (81 mi)					
30 June; 05:33	(United States) Journeyman		(United States) Wallops Island LA-4		(United States) NASA	
30 June; 05:33		Michigan	Suborbital	Radio astronomy	30 June	Successful
30 June; 05:33	Apogee: 1,770 kilometres (1,100 mi)					
30 June; 14:29:30	(United States) LGM-25C Titan II		(United States) Vandenberg LC-395D		(United States) Strategic Air Command	
30 June; 14:29:30		Strategic Air Command	Suborbital	Missile test	30 June	Successful
30 June; 14:29:30	Apogee: 1,300 kilometres (810 mi)					
30 June; 14:30	(United States) Aerobee-150 (Hi)		(United States) White Sands LC-35		(United States) NASA	
30 June; 14:30		NASA	Suborbital	Technology	30 June	Successful
30 June; 14:30	Apogee: 158 kilometres (98 mi)					
June	(United States) Nike-Javelin		(United States) White Sands		(United States) DASA	
June		DASA	Suborbital	Aeronomy	June	Successful
June	Apogee: 100 kilometres (62 mi)					
June	(United States) Nike-Apache		(United States) White Sands		(United States) US Army	
June		US Army	Suborbital	Aeronomy	June	Successful
June	Apogee: 100 kilometres (62 mi)					
June	(United States) Nike-Apache		(United States) White Sands		(United States) US Army	
June		US Army	Suborbital	Aeronomy	June	Successful
June	Apogee: 100 kilometres (62 mi)					
June	(United States) Nike-Zeus 3		(United States) Kwajalein		(United States) US Army	
June		US Army	Suborbital	ABM test	June	Successful
June	Apogee: 200 kilometres (120 mi)					
June	(United States) Nike-Zeus 3		(United States) Kwajalein		(United States) US Army	
June		US Army	Suborbital	ABM test	June	Successful
June	Apogee: 200 kilometres (120 mi)					
June	(Canada) Martlet 2		Barbados		(Canada) (United States) DND/DoD	
June		DND/DoD	Suborbital	Ionospheric	June	Successful
June	Apogee: 100 kilometres (62 mi)					
June	(Canada) Martlet 2		Barbados		(Canada) (United States) DND/DoD	
June		DND/DoD	Suborbital	Ionospheric	June	Successful
June	Apogee: 100 kilometres (62 mi)					
June	(Canada) Martlet 2		Barbados		(Canada) (United States) DND/DoD	
June		DND/DoD	Suborbital	Ionospheric	June	Successful
June	Apogee: 100 kilometres (62 mi)					
June	(Canada) Martlet 2		Barbados		(Canada) (United States) DND/DoD	
June		DND/DoD	Suborbital	Ionospheric	June	Successful
June	Apogee: 100 kilometres (62 mi)					
June	(Canada) Martlet 3		Barbados		(Canada) (United States) DND/DoD	
June		DND/DoD	Suborbital	Ionospheric	June	Successful
June	Apogee: 100 kilometres (62 mi)					
June	(Canada) Martlet 3		Barbados		(Canada) (United States) DND/DoD	
June		DND/DoD	Suborbital	Ionospheric	June	Successful
June	Apogee: 100 kilometres (62 mi)					

- ← Jan
- Feb
- Mar
- Apr
- May
- Jun
- Jul
- Aug
- Sep
- Oct
- Nov
- Dec →
