= Kosmos 101 =

Soviet radar calibration target satellite

- Mission type: ABM radar target
- COSPAR ID: 1965-107A
- SATCAT no.: 01846
- Mission duration: 203 days

Spacecraft properties
- Spacecraft type: DS-P1-Yu
- Manufacturer: Yuzhnoye
- Launch mass: 325 kg

Start of mission
- Launch date: 21 December 1965; 06:14:00 GMT
- Rocket: Kosmos-2I 63S1
- Launch site: Kapustin Yar, Site 86/1
- Contractor: Yuzhnoye

End of mission
- Decay date: 12 July 1966

Orbital parameters
- Reference system: Geocentric
- Regime: Low Earth
- Perigee altitude: 254 km
- Apogee altitude: 539 km
- Inclination: 49.0°
- Period: 92.4 minutes
- Epoch: 21 December 1965

Kosmos 101 (Russian: Космос 101 meaning Cosmos 101), also known as DS-P1-Yu No.4 was a Soviet satellite which was used as a radar calibration target for tests of anti-ballistic missiles. It was built by the Yuzhnoye Design Bureau, and launched in 1965 as part of the Dnepropetrovsk Sputnik programme.

The launch of Kosmos 101 was conducted using a Kosmos-2I 63S1 carrier rocket, which flew from Site 86/1 at Kapustin Yar. The launch occurred at 06:14 GMT on 21 December 1965.

Kosmos 101 separated from its carrier rocket into a low Earth orbit with a perigee of 254 kilometres (158 mi), an apogee of 539 kilometres (335 mi), an inclination of 49.0°, and an orbital period of 92.4 minutes. It decayed from orbit on 12 July 1966. Kosmos 101 was the fourth of seventy nine DS-P1-Yu satellites to be launched, of which all but seven were successful.

== See also ==
- 1965 in spaceflight
