= 1965 in spaceflight =

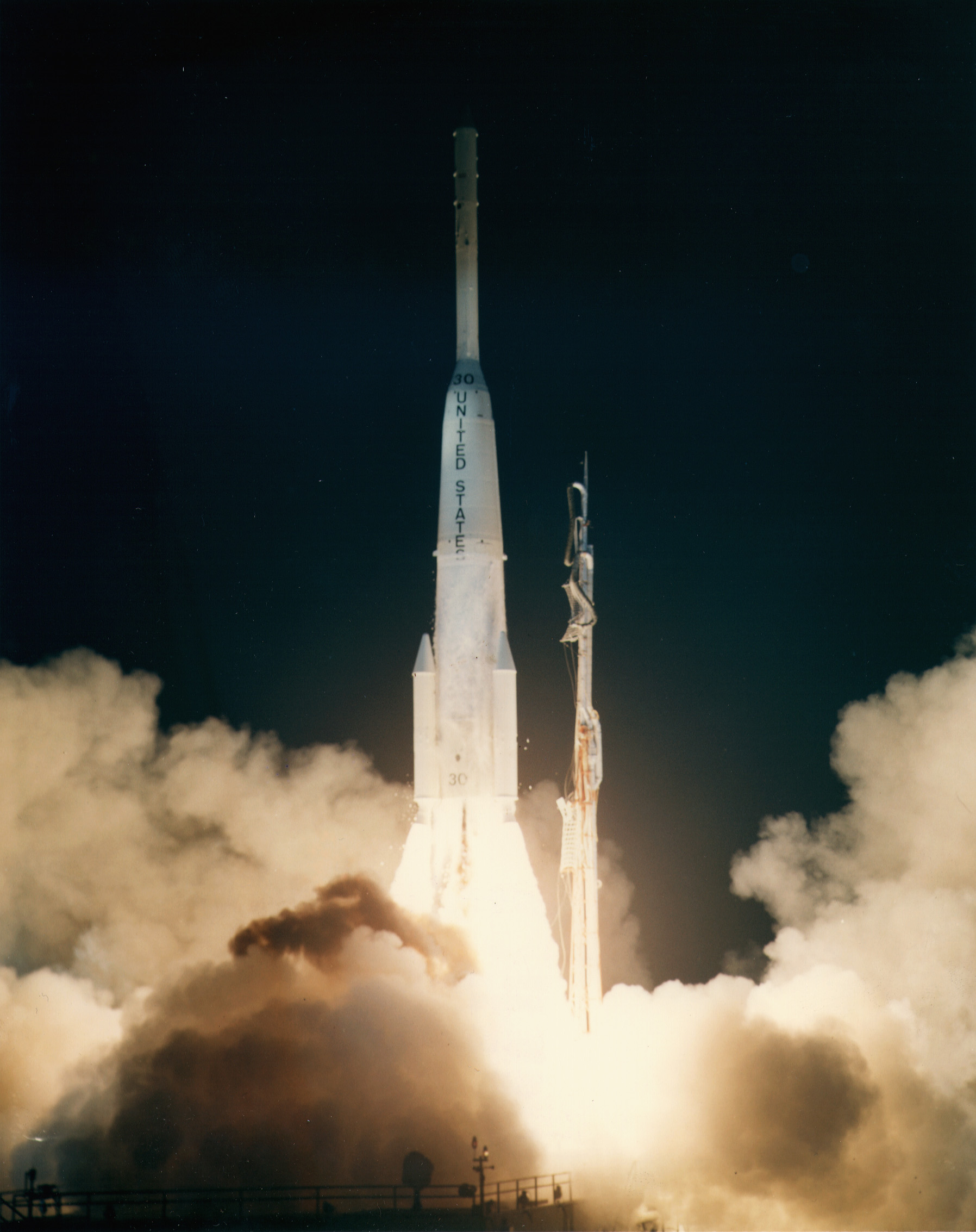
- Launch of a Delta D rocket carrying the first commercial geosynchronous communications satellite, Intelsat I F1

Orbital launches
- First: 11 January
- Last: 28 December
- Total: 124
- Successes: 108
- Failures: 15
- Partial failures: 1
- Catalogued: 112

National firsts
- Satellite: France
- Orbital launch: France

Rockets
- Maiden flights: Atlas LV-3C Centaur-D; Delta E Diamant-A; Kosmos-2M; Scout A Scout B Soyuz/Vostok 11A510; Thor LV-2D Burner-1; Thor LV-2D MG-18; Titan IIIC; UR-500 (Proton)
- Retirements: Atlas LV-3A Agena-B; Atlas LV-3C Centaur-C; Delta D Kosmos-1; Molniya 8K78; Molniya-L 8K78L; Saturn I Scout X-4; Thor DSV-2A Ablestar; Thor LV-2D MG-18; Thor SLV-2 Agena-B; Titan IIIA

Crewed flights
- Orbital: 6
- Total travellers: 13

1965 in spaceflight

- ← Jan
- Feb
- Mar
- Apr
- May
- Jun
- Jul
- Aug
- Sep
- Oct
- Nov
- Dec →

== Deep Space Rendezvous ==
Date (UTC)	Spacecraft	Event	Remarks
20 February	Ranger 8	Lunar impact	Impacted Mare Tranquillitatis at 09:57:37, returned 7,137 images
24 March	Ranger 9	Lunar impact	Impacted Alphonsus Crater at 14:08:20, returned 5,814 images
12 May	Luna 5	Lunar impact	Failed lander, impacted at 19:10
11 June	Luna 6	Lunar flyby	Failed lander, closest approach: 160,000 kilometres (99,000 mi)
15 July	Mariner 4	Flyby of Mars	Returned 21 images
20 July	Zond 2	Flyby of Mars	Communications system failed before flyby
6 August	Zond 3	Lunar Flyby	Returned 25 images
7 October	Luna 7	Lunar impact	Failed lander, impacted at 22:08
6 December	Luna 8	Lunar impact	Failed lander, impacted at 21:51:30

== EVAs ==
Start date/time	Duration	End time	Spacecraft	Crew	Remarks
18 March; 08:34	12 minutes	08:47	Voskhod 2	(Soviet Union) Alexei Leonov	First EVA in history. Leonov had difficulty fitting back into the spacecraft due to spacesuit stiffness in vacuum. He vented air from his spacesuit to bend back into the capsule.
3 June; 19:46	20 minutes	20:06	Gemini IV	(United States) Ed White	First US EVA. White also had difficulty returning to the Gemini spacecraft. Although very fit, the effort left White exhausted.

== Orbital launch statistics ==
=== By country ===
Country	Launches	Successes	Failures	Partial failures
France	1	1	0	0
Soviet Union	53	46	7	0
United States	70	61	8	1
World	124	108	15	1

=== By rocket ===
Rocket	Country	Launches	Successes	Failures	Partial failures	Remarks
Atlas D	United States	3	1	2	0	Suborbital component of one failed launch was successful
Atlas LV-3A Agena-B	United States	2	2	0	0	Retired
Atlas LV-3A Agena-D	United States	1	1	0	0	
Atlas SLV-3 Agena-D	United States	11	9	2	0	
Atlas LV-3C Centaur-C	United States	1	0	1	0	Retired
Atlas LV-3C Centaur-D	United States	1	1	0	0	Maiden flight
Delta C	United States	5	4	1	0	
Delta D	United States	1	1	0	0	Retired
Delta E	United States	2	2	0	0	Maiden flight
Diamant A	France	1	1	0	0	Maiden flight
Kosmos-1 63S3	Soviet Union	6	6	0	0	Retired
Kosmos-2I 63S1	Soviet Union	7	4	3	0	
Kosmos-2M 63S1M	Soviet Union	3	3	0	0	Maiden flight
Molniya 8K78	Soviet Union	6	5	1	0	Retired
Molniya-L 8K78L	Soviet Union	1	0	1	0	Retired
Molniya-M 8K78M	Soviet Union	5	4	1	0	
Saturn I	United States	3	3	0	0	Retired
Scout A	United States	1	1	0	0	Maiden flight
Scout B	United States	1	1	0	0	Maiden flight
Scout X-4	United States	3	3	0	0	Retired
Soyuz/Vostok 11A510	Soviet Union	1	1	0	0	Maiden flight
Thor DSV-2A Ablestar	United States	3	3	0	0	Retired
Thor LV-2D Burner-1	United States	2	2	0	0	Maiden flight
Thor LV-2D MG-18	United States	2	2	0	0	Only flights
Thor SLV-2 Agena-B	United States	1	1	0	1	Retired
Thor SLV-2 Agena-D	United States	2	1	1	0	
Thrust Augmented Thor SLV-2A Agena-D	United States	15	15	0	0	
Titan II GLV	United States	5	5	0	0	Also made one suborbital launch
Titan IIIA	United States	2	2	0	0	Retired
Titan IIIC	United States	3	1	1	1	Maiden flight
Voskhod 11A57	Soviet Union	12	12	0	0	
Vostok-2 8A92	Soviet Union	8	7	1	0	
Vostok-2M 8A92M	Soviet Union	2	2	0	0	
UR-500 (Proton) 8K72	Soviet Union	2	2	0	0	Maiden flight

=== By orbit ===
Orbital regime	Launches	Achieved	Not Achieved	Accidentally Achieved	Remarks
Low Earth	96	85	9	2	
Medium Earth	7	6	1	0	
High Earth	13	11	2	0	Including Highly elliptical and Molniya orbits
Geosynchronous/transfer	3	1	2	1*	* - One launch to geosynchronous orbit reached geosynchronous transfer orbit
Heliocentric	5	4	1	0	
