= 1965 in spaceflight (July–September) =

This is a list of spaceflights launched between July and September 1965. For launches in the rest of the year, see 1965 in spaceflight (January–March), 1965 in spaceflight (April–June) and 1965 in spaceflight (October–December). For an overview of the whole year, see 1965 in spaceflight.

== Orbital launches ==
- ← Jan
- Feb
- Mar
- Apr
- May
- Jun
- Jul
- Aug
- Sep
- Oct
- Nov
- Dec →

Date and time (UTC)	Rocket	Flight number	Launch site		LSP	
Date and time (UTC)	Payload (⚀ = CubeSat)	Operator	Orbit	Function	Decay (UTC)	Outcome
Date and time (UTC)	Remarks					
=== July ===
2 July; 04:07:00	(United States) Delta C		(United States) Cape Canaveral LC-17B		(United States) NASA	
2 July; 04:07:00	(United States) TIROS-10 (A-55/OT1)	ESSA	Sun-synchronous	Weather	In orbit	Successful
2 July; 04:07:00	Ceased operations on 1 July 1967.					
2 July; 06:30	(Soviet Union) Kosmos 63S1		(Soviet Union) Kapustin Yar Site 86/1		(Soviet Union)	
2 July; 06:30	(Soviet Union) Kosmos 70 (DS-A1 №4)		Low Earth	Technology/Radiation	18 December 1966	Successful
12 July; 19:00	(United States) Atlas SLV-3 Agena-D		(United States) Vandenberg PALC-2-4		(United States) US Air Force	
12 July; 19:00	(United States) OPS 5810 (KH-7 20/AFP-206)	US Air Force/NRO	Intended: Low Earth	Optical imaging	12 July	Launch failure
12 July; 19:00	Failed to orbit.					
13 July	(Soviet Union) Vostok-2		(Soviet Union) Baikonur Site 31/6		(Soviet Union)	
13 July	(Soviet Union) Zenit-2 №29	GRU	Intended: Low Earth	Optical imaging	13 July	Launch failure
13 July	Guidance system failed during second stage burn, failed to achieve orbit.					
16 July; 03:31	(Soviet Union) Kosmos-1		(Soviet Union) Baikonur Site 41/15		(Soviet Union)	
16 July; 03:31	(Soviet Union) Kosmos 71 (Strela-1 №15)		Low Earth	Communication	11 August 1970	Successful
16 July; 03:31	(Soviet Union) Kosmos 72 (Strela-1 №16)		Low Earth	Communication	24 August 1979	Successful
16 July; 03:31	(Soviet Union) Kosmos 73 (Strela-1 №17)		Low Earth	Communication	20 March 1974	Successful
16 July; 03:31	(Soviet Union) Kosmos 74 (Strela-1 №18)		Low Earth	Communication	13 December 1979	Successful
16 July; 03:31	(Soviet Union) Kosmos 75 (Strela-1 №19)		Low Earth	Communication	28 September 1979	Successful
16 July; 11:15:59	(Soviet Union) UR-500 (Proton)		(Soviet Union) Baikonur Site 81/23		(Soviet Union)	
16 July; 11:15:59	(Soviet Union) Proton 1 (N-4 №1)		Low Earth	Physics	11 October	Successful
16 July; 11:15:59	Maiden flight of UR-500 rocket (later known as Proton).					
17 July; 05:55:01	(United States) Thrust Augmented Thor SLV-2A Agena-D		(United States) Vandenberg LC-75-1-2		(United States) US Air Force	
17 July; 05:55:01	(United States) OPS 8411 (Samos-F3 4/Ferret 8)	US Air Force	Low Earth	ELINT	18 December 1968	Successful
18 July; 14:38	(Soviet Union) Molniya		(Soviet Union) Baikonur Site 1/5		(Soviet Union)	
18 July; 14:38	(Soviet Union) Zond 3 (3MV-4 №2)		Heliocentric	Lunar flyby	In orbit	Successful
19 July; 22:01:12	(United States) Thrust Augmented Thor SLV-2A Agena-D		(United States) Vandenberg PALC-1-1		(United States) US Air Force	
19 July; 22:01:12	(United States) OPS 5543 (KH-4A 22/1022)	US Air Force/NRO	Low Earth	Optical imaging	18 August	Successful
19 July; 22:01:12	(United States) SRV 664	US Air Force/NRO	Low Earth	Film return	July	Successful
19 July; 22:01:12	(United States) SRV 658	US Air Force/NRO	Low Earth	Film return	July/August	Successful
20 July; 08:26:59	(United States) Atlas LV-3A Agena-D		(United States) Cape Canaveral LC-13		(United States) US Air Force	
20 July; 08:26:59	(United States) OPS 6577 (Vela 5/Vela 3A)	US Air Force	High Earth	Nuclear test detection Radiation research	In orbit	Successful
20 July; 08:26:59	(United States) OPS 6564 (Vela 6/Vela 3B)	US Air Force	High Earth	Nuclear test detection Radiation research	In orbit	Successful
20 July; 08:26:59	(United States) ERS-17 (ORS-3)	US Air Force	Highly elliptical	Astronomy	1 July 1968	Successful
23 July; 04:33	(Soviet Union) Kosmos 63S1		(Soviet Union) Kapustin Yar Site 86/1		(Soviet Union)	
23 July; 04:33	(Soviet Union) Kosmos 76 (DS-P1-Yu №3)		Low Earth	Radar calibration	16 March 1966	Successful
30 July; 13:00:00	(United States) Saturn I		(United States) Cape Canaveral LC-37B		(United States) NASA	
30 July; 13:00:00	(United States) Apollo BP-9A	NASA	Low Earth	Technology	22 November 1975	Successful
30 July; 13:00:00	(United States) Pegasus 3	NASA	Low Earth	Micrometeoroids	4 August 1969	Successful
30 July; 13:00:00	Final flight of Saturn I, boilerplate test of Apollo spacecraft, Pegasus ceased operations on 29 August 1968.					
← Jan; Feb; Mar; Apr; May; Jun; Jul; Aug; Sep; Oct; Nov; Dec →; === August ===
3 August; 11:02	(Soviet Union) Voskhod		(Soviet Union) Baikonur Site 31/6		(Soviet Union)	
3 August; 11:02	(Soviet Union) Kosmos 77 (Zenit-4 №9)	GRU	Low Earth	Optical imaging	11 August	Successful
3 August; 19:12	(United States) Atlas SLV-3 Agena-D		(United States) Vandenberg PALC-2-4		(United States) US Air Force	
3 August; 19:12	(United States) OPS 5698 (KH-7 21/AFP-206)	US Air Force/NRO	Low Earth	Optical imaging	7 August	Successful
3 August; 19:12	(United States) OPS 6761 (Magnum P-11 4403)	US Air Force/NRO	Low Earth	ELINT	17 June 1968	Successful
10 August; 17:54:00	(United States) Scout B		(United States) Wallops Island LA-3A		(United States) NASA	
10 August; 17:54:00	(United States) SEV (FW4S 20038)	NASA	Medium Earth	Launch vehicle evaluation		
10 August; 17:54:00	(United States) SECOR-5 (EGRS-5)	US Army	Medium Earth	Geodesy	In orbit	Successful
10 August; 17:54:00	Maiden flight of Scout B.					
11 August; 14:31:04	(United States) Atlas LV-3C Centaur-D	AC-6	(United States) Canaveral LC-36B		(United States) NASA	
11 August; 14:31:04	(United States) Surveyor SD-2	NASA	Highly elliptical	Boilerplate	In orbit	Successful
11 August; 14:31:04	Maiden flight of Atlas LV-3C Centaur-D.					
13 August; 22:11:24	(United States) Thor DSV-2A Ablestar		(United States) Vandenberg LC-75-1-1		(United States) US Air Force	
13 August; 22:11:24	(United States) OPS 8464 (Transit O-5/NNS 30050)	US Navy	Low Earth	Navigation	In orbit	Spacecraft failure
13 August; 22:11:24	(United States) Dodecapole 2	NRL	Low Earth	Radar calibration	In orbit	Successful
13 August; 22:11:24	(United States) Tempsat-1	NRL	Low Earth	Radar calibration	In orbit	Successful
13 August; 22:11:24	(United States) Long Rod	NRL	Low Earth	Radar calibration	In orbit	Successful
13 August; 22:11:24	(United States) Calsphere 4A	NRL	Low Earth	Radar calibration	In orbit	Successful
13 August; 22:11:24	(United States) SURCAL 5	NRL	Low Earth	Radar calibration	In orbit	Successful
13 August; 22:11:24	Transit O-5 failed a few weeks after launch, final flight of Thor-Ablestar.					
14 August; 11:16	(Soviet Union) Vostok-2		(Soviet Union) Baikonur Site 31/6		(Soviet Union)	
14 August; 11:16	(Soviet Union) Kosmos 78 (Zenit-2 №30)	GRU	Low Earth	Optical imaging	22 August	Successful
17 August; 20:59:57	(United States) Thrust Augmented Thor SLV-2A Agena-D		(United States) Vandenberg PALC-1-1		(United States) US Air Force	
17 August; 20:59:57	(United States) OPS 7208 (KH-4A 23/1023)	US Air Force/NRO	Low Earth	Optical imaging	11 October	Partial spacecraft failure
17 August; 20:59:57	(United States) SRV 621	US Air Force/NRO	Low Earth	Film return	August	Successful
17 August; 20:59:57	(United States) SRV 649	US Air Force/NRO	Low Earth	Film return	August/September	Successful
17 August; 20:59:57	Forward camera erroneously shut down for 29 orbits partway through mission.					
21 August; 14:00:00	(United States) Titan II GLV		(United States) Cape Canaveral LC-19		(United States) US Air Force	
21 August; 14:00:00	(United States) Gemini V	NASA	Low Earth	Technology	29 August; 12:55:13	Successful
21 August; 14:00:00	(United States) REP	NASA	Low Earth	Target	27 August	Successful
21 August; 14:00:00	Carried two astronauts, rendezvous with radar pod not attempted due to fuel cell problem, rendezvous instead performed with a predetermined point in space. Landed off course due to confusion between Solar and sidereal days.					
25 August; 10:19	(Soviet Union) Voskhod		(Soviet Union) Baikonur Site 1/5		(Soviet Union)	
25 August; 10:19	(Soviet Union) Kosmos 79 (Zenit-4 №10)	GRU	Low Earth	Optical imaging	2 September	Successful
25 August; 15:17:00	(United States) Delta C	D-33	(United States) Cape Canaveral LC-17B		(United States) NASA	
25 August; 15:17:00	(United States) OSO-C	NASA	Intended: Low Earth	Solar astronomy	25 August	Launch failure
25 August; 15:17:00	Third stage ignited ahead of schedule, failed to orbit.					
← Jan; Feb; Mar; Apr; May; Jun; Jul; Aug; Sep; Oct; Nov; Dec →; === September ===
2 September; 20:00:16	(United States) Thor SLV-2 Agena-D		(United States) Vandenberg LC-75-3-5		(United States) US Air Force	
2 September; 20:00:16	(United States) OPS 3373 (FTV 1602/STARAD-2)	US Air Force	Intended: Medium Earth	Radiation	2 September	Launch failure
2 September; 20:00:16	Upper stage malfunctioned, failed to orbit.					
3 September; 14:00	(Soviet Union) Kosmos-1		(Soviet Union) Baikonur Site 41/15		(Soviet Union)	
3 September; 14:00	(Soviet Union) Kosmos 80 (Strela-1 №20)		Low Earth	Communication	In orbit	Successful
3 September; 14:00	(Soviet Union) Kosmos 81 (Strela-1 №21)		Low Earth	Communication	In orbit	Successful
3 September; 14:00	(Soviet Union) Kosmos 82 (Strela-1 №22)		Low Earth	Communication	In orbit	Successful
3 September; 14:00	(Soviet Union) Kosmos 83 (Strela-1 №23)		Low Earth	Communication	In orbit	Successful
3 September; 14:00	(Soviet Union) Kosmos 84 (Strela-1 №24)		Low Earth	Communication	In orbit	Successful
9 September; 09:36	(Soviet Union) Voskhod		(Soviet Union) Baikonur Site 31/6		(Soviet Union)	
9 September; 09:36	(Soviet Union) Kosmos 85 (Zenit-4 №11)	GRU	Low Earth	Optical imaging	17 September	Successful
10 September; 04:41:38	(United States) Thor LV-2D Burner-1		(United States) Vandenberg LC-4300B-6		(United States) US Air Force	
10 September; 04:41:38	(United States) OPS 8068 (DSAP-2 F1/DAPP 13)	US Air Force	Sun-synchronous	Weather	In orbit	Successful
18 September; 07:59	(Soviet Union) Kosmos-1		(Soviet Union) Baikonur Site 41/15		(Soviet Union)	
18 September; 07:59	(Soviet Union) Kosmos 86 (Strela-1 №25)		Low Earth	Communication	In orbit	Successful
18 September; 07:59	(Soviet Union) Kosmos 87 (Strela-1 №26)		Low Earth	Communication	In orbit	Successful
18 September; 07:59	(Soviet Union) Kosmos 88 (Strela-1 №27)		Low Earth	Communication	In orbit	Successful
18 September; 07:59	(Soviet Union) Kosmos 89 (Strela-1 №28)		Low Earth	Communication	In orbit	Successful
18 September; 07:59	(Soviet Union) Kosmos 90 (Strela-1 №29)		Low Earth	Communication	In orbit	Successful
22 September; 21:31:14	(United States) Thrust Augmented Thor SLV-2A Agena-D		(United States) Vandenberg PALC-1-1		(United States) US Air Force	
22 September; 21:31:14	(United States) OPS 7221 (KH-4A 24/1024)	US Air Force/NRO	Low Earth	Optical imaging	11 October	Successful
22 September; 21:31:14	(United States) SRV 622	US Air Force/NRO	Low Earth	Film return	September	Successful
22 September; 21:31:14	(United States) SRV 643	US Air Force/NRO	Low Earth	Film return	September/October	Successful
23 September; 09:07	(Soviet Union) Voskhod		(Soviet Union) Baikonur Site 31/6		(Soviet Union)	
23 September; 09:07	(Soviet Union) Kosmos 91 (Zenit-4 №12)	GRU	Low Earth	Optical imaging	1 October	Successful
30 September; 19:20	(United States) Atlas SLV-3 Agena-D		(United States) Vandenberg PALC-2-4		(United States) US Air Force	
30 September; 19:20	(United States) OPS 7208 (KH-7 22/AFP-206)	US Air Force/NRO	Low Earth	Optical imaging	5 October	Successful
← Jan; Feb; Mar; Apr; May; Jun; Jul; Aug; Sep; Oct; Nov; Dec →
For flights after 30 September, see 1965 in spaceflight (October-December)

== Suborbital launches ==
- ← Jan
- Feb
- Mar
- Apr
- May
- Jun
- Jul
- Aug
- Sep
- Oct
- Nov
- Dec →

Date and time (UTC)	Rocket	Flight number	Launch site		LSP	
Date and time (UTC)	Payload (⚀ = CubeSat)	Operator	Orbit	Function	Decay (UTC)	Outcome
Date and time (UTC)	Remarks					
=== July ===
1 July; 01:45	(United Kingdom) Skylark-7C		(Australia) Woomera LA-2		(United Kingdom) (Australia) RAE/WRE	
1 July; 01:45		UCL	Suborbital	Ionospheric; Solar	1 July	Successful
1 July; 01:45	Apogee: 130 kilometres (81 mi)					
1 July; 09:54:11	(United States) SM-65D Atlas		(United States) Vandenberg ABRES-B-1		(United States) US Air Force	
1 July; 09:54:11		US Air Force	Suborbital	REV Test	1 July	Successful
1 July; 09:54:11	Apogee: 1,800 kilometres (1,100 mi)					
2 July	(United States) LGM-30B Minuteman IB		(United States) Vandenberg LF-03		(United States) Strategic Air Command	
2 July		Strategic Air Command	Suborbital	Missile test	2 July	Successful
2 July	Apogee: 1,300 kilometres (810 mi)					
5 July	(France) Saphir		(Algeria) Hammaguira Brigitte		(France) ONERA	
5 July		ONERA	Suborbital	REV Test	5 July	Successful
5 July	Apogee: 1,000 kilometres (620 mi)					
6 July	(United States) LGM-30B Minuteman IB		(United States) Vandenberg LF-07		(United States) Strategic Air Command	
6 July		Strategic Air Command	Suborbital	Missile test	6 July	Successful
6 July	Apogee: 1,300 kilometres (810 mi)					
7 July; 07:25	(United States) Aerobee-150 (Hi)		(Canada) Churchill		(United States) US Air Force	
7 July; 07:25		US Air Force	Suborbital	Aeronomy	7 July	Successful
7 July; 07:25	Apogee: 166 kilometres (103 mi)					
7 July; 08:37	(United States) HAD		(Australia) Woomera LA-2		(Australia) WRE	
7 July; 08:37		WRE	Suborbital	Aeronomy	7 July	Successful
7 July; 08:37	Apogee: 105 kilometres (65 mi)					
8 July	(United States) Sparoair III		(United States) F-4B, Point Mugu		(United States) US Navy	
8 July		US Navy	Suborbital	Test flight	8 July	Launch failure
8 July	Apogee: 27 kilometres (17 mi)					
8 July	(United States) Nike-Zeus 3		(United States) Kwajalein		(United States) US Army	
8 July		US Army	Suborbital	ASAT test	8 July	Successful
8 July	Apogee: 200 kilometres (120 mi)					
9 July	(Soviet Union) R-36		(Soviet Union) Baikonur PU-33		(Soviet Union) RVSN	
9 July		RVSN	Suborbital	Missile test	9 July	Successful
9 July	Apogee: 1,000 kilometres (620 mi)					
10 July	(Soviet Union) UR-100		(Soviet Union) Baikonur		(Soviet Union) RVSN	
10 July		RVSN	Suborbital	Missile test	10 July	Launch failure
10 July	(France) Saphir		(Algeria) Hammaguira Brigitte		(France) ONERA	
10 July		ONERA	Suborbital	REV Test	10 July	Launch failure
10 July	Apogee: 50 kilometres (31 mi)					
14 July; 07:57	(United States) Aerobee-150 (Hi)		(Canada) Churchill		(United States) US Air Force	
14 July; 07:57		US Air Force	Suborbital	Aeronomy	14 July	Launch failure
14 July; 11:08	(United Kingdom) Skylark-7C		(Australia) Woomera LA-2		(United Kingdom) (Australia) RAE/WRE	
14 July; 11:08		UCL	Suborbital	UV astronomy	14 July	Successful
14 July; 11:08	Apogee: 182 kilometres (113 mi)					
15 July; 20:50	(United States) Aerobee-150 (Hi)		(United States) White Sands LC-35		(United States) NASA	
15 July; 20:50		Minnesota	Suborbital	Aeronomy	15 July	Successful
15 July; 20:50	Apogee: 196 kilometres (122 mi)					
16 July; 10:50	(Japan) Kappa-8		(Japan) Kagoshima		(Japan) ISAS	
16 July; 10:50		Tokyo	Suborbital	Aeronomy; Ionospheric	16 July	Successful
16 July; 10:50	Apogee: 160 kilometres (99 mi)					
16 July	(United States) Athena RTV		(United States) Green River Pad 1		(United States) US Air Force	
16 July		US Air Force	Suborbital	REV Test	16 July	Successful
16 July	Apogee: 200 kilometres (120 mi)					
17 July	(Soviet Union) UR-100		(Soviet Union) Baikonur Site 131		(Soviet Union) RVSN	
17 July		RVSN	Suborbital	Missile test	17 July	Launch failure
20 July	(United States) Athena RTV		(United States) Green River Pad 3		(United States) US Air Force	
20 July		US Air Force	Suborbital	REV Test	20 July	Launch failure
21 July; 10:33:00	(United States) Nike-Iroquois		(United States) Eglin		(United States) US Air Force	
21 July; 10:33:00		AFCRL	Suborbital	Aeronomy	21 July	Successful
21 July; 10:33:00	Apogee: 178 kilometres (111 mi)					
21 July; 18:18:46	(United States) LGM-25C Titan II		(United States) Vandenberg LC-395B		(United States) Strategic Air Command	
21 July; 18:18:46		Strategic Air Command	Suborbital	Missile test	21 July	Successful
21 July; 18:18:46	Apogee: 1,300 kilometres (810 mi)					
21 July; 20:00	(United States) Aerobee-150 (Hi)		(United States) White Sands LC-35		(United States) US Air Force	
21 July; 20:00		AFCRL	Suborbital	Ionospheric	21 July	Successful
21 July; 20:00	Apogee: 193 kilometres (120 mi)					
21 July	(Soviet Union) R-16U		(Soviet Union) Baikonur Site 60/6		(Soviet Union) RVSN	
21 July		RVSN	Suborbital	Missile test	21 July	Successful
21 July	Apogee: 1,210 kilometres (750 mi)					
23 July; 17:05	(United States) Nike-Cajun		(United States) Wallops Island		(United States) NASA	
23 July; 17:05		NASA	Suborbital	Aeronomy	23 July	Successful
23 July; 17:05	Apogee: 116 kilometres (72 mi)					
24 July; 08:36	(United States) Aerobee-150 (Hi)		(Canada) Churchill		(United States) US Air Force	
24 July; 08:36		US Air Force	Suborbital	Aeronomy	24 July	Successful
24 July; 08:36	Apogee: 179 kilometres (111 mi)					
26 July; 12:01	(Japan) Kappa-9M		(Japan) Kagoshima		(Japan) ISAS	
26 July; 12:01		ISAS/TAO	Suborbital	Astronomy	26 July	Successful
26 July; 12:01	Apogee: 350 kilometres (220 mi)					
26 July; 17:00	(United Kingdom) Black Knight 301		(Australia) Woomera LA-5		(United Kingdom) RAE	
26 July; 17:00		RAE	Suborbital	REV Test	26 July	Successful
26 July; 17:00	Apogee: 492 kilometres (306 mi)					
26 July	(United States) Athena RTV		(United States) Green River Pad 2		(United States) US Air Force	
26 July		US Air Force	Suborbital	REV Test	26 July	Successful
26 July	Apogee: 200 kilometres (120 mi)					
27 July; 03:10	(Japan) Kappa-9M		(Japan) Kagoshima		(Japan) ISAS	
27 July; 03:10		Tokai	Suborbital	Ionospheric	27 July	Successful
27 July; 03:10	Apogee: 317 kilometres (197 mi)					
27 July	(United States) Athena RTV		(United States) Green River Pad 1		(United States) US Air Force	
27 July		US Air Force	Suborbital	REV Test	27 July	Launch failure
29 July; 01:15	(United Kingdom) Skylark-7C		(Australia) Woomera LA-2		(United Kingdom) (Australia) RAE/WRE	
29 July; 01:15		UCL	Suborbital	Ionospheric; Solar	29 July	Launch failure
31 July	(Soviet Union) UR-100		(Soviet Union) Baikonur Site 131		(Soviet Union) RVSN	
31 July		RVSN	Suborbital	Missile test	31 July	Launch failure
31 July	(United States) Athena RTV		(United States) Green River Pad 2		(United States) US Air Force	
31 July		US Air Force	Suborbital	REV Test	31 July	Successful
31 July	Apogee: 200 kilometres (120 mi)					
July	(United States) Nike-Apache		(United States) White Sands		(United States) US Army	
July		US Army	Suborbital	Aeronomy	July	Successful
July	Apogee: 100 kilometres (62 mi)					
July	(United States) Nike-Apache		(United States) White Sands		(United States) US Army	
July		US Army	Suborbital	Aeronomy	July	Successful
July	Apogee: 100 kilometres (62 mi)					
July	(United States) Nike-Apache		(United States) White Sands		(United States) US Army	
July		US Army	Suborbital	Aeronomy	July	Successful
July	Apogee: 100 kilometres (62 mi)					
July	(United States) Nike-Apache		(United States) White Sands		(United States) US Army	
July		US Army	Suborbital	Aeronomy	July	Successful
July	Apogee: 100 kilometres (62 mi)					
July	(United States) Nike-Apache		(United States) White Sands		(United States) US Army	
July		US Army	Suborbital	Aeronomy	July	Successful
July	Apogee: 100 kilometres (62 mi)					
July	(United States) Nike-Apache		(United States) White Sands		(United States) US Army	
July		US Army	Suborbital	Aeronomy	July	Successful
July	Apogee: 100 kilometres (62 mi)					
July	(United States) Nike-Apache		(United States) White Sands		(United States) US Army	
July		US Army	Suborbital	Aeronomy	July	Successful
July	Apogee: 100 kilometres (62 mi)					
July	(United States) Nike-Apache		(United States) White Sands		(United States) US Army	
July		US Army	Suborbital	Aeronomy	July	Successful
July	Apogee: 100 kilometres (62 mi)					
July	(United States) Nike-Apache		(United States) White Sands		(United States) US Army	
July		US Army	Suborbital	Aeronomy	July	Successful
July	Apogee: 100 kilometres (62 mi)					
July	(United States) Nike-Apache		(United States) White Sands		(United States) US Army	
July		US Army	Suborbital	Aeronomy	July	Successful
July	Apogee: 100 kilometres (62 mi)					
July	(United States) Nike-Apache		(United States) White Sands		(United States) US Army	
July		US Army	Suborbital	Aeronomy	July	Successful
July	Apogee: 100 kilometres (62 mi)					
July	(United States) Nike-Apache		(United States) White Sands		(United States) US Army	
July		US Army	Suborbital	Aeronomy	July	Successful
July	Apogee: 100 kilometres (62 mi)					
July	(United States) Nike-Apache		(United States) White Sands		(United States) US Army	
July		US Army	Suborbital	Aeronomy	July	Successful
July	Apogee: 100 kilometres (62 mi)					
July	(United States) Nike-Apache		(United States) White Sands		(United States) US Army	
July		US Army	Suborbital	Aeronomy	July	Successful
July	Apogee: 100 kilometres (62 mi)					
July	(United States) Nike-Apache		(United States) White Sands		(United States) US Army	
July		US Army	Suborbital	Aeronomy	July	Successful
July	Apogee: 100 kilometres (62 mi)					
July	(United States) Nike-Zeus 3		(United States) Kwajalein		(United States) US Army	
July		US Army	Suborbital	ABM test	July	Successful
July	Apogee: 200 kilometres (120 mi)					
=== August ===
3 August; 04:30	(United States) Athena RTV		(United States) Green River Pad 3		(United States) US Air Force	
3 August; 04:30		US Air Force	Suborbital	REV Test	3 August	Successful
3 August; 04:30	Apogee: 200 kilometres (120 mi)					
3 August; 08:52	(United States) HAD		(Australia) Woomera LA-2		(Australia) WRE	
3 August; 08:52		WRE	Suborbital	Aeronomy	3 August	Successful
3 August; 08:52	Apogee: 115 kilometres (71 mi)					
3 August	(Soviet Union) R-36		(Soviet Union) Baikonur PU-32		(Soviet Union) RVSN	
3 August		RVSN	Suborbital	Missile test	3 August	Launch failure
4 August; 03:41:10	(United States) LGM-30F Minuteman II		(United States) Cape Canaveral LC-32B		(United States) US Air Force	
4 August; 03:41:10		US Air Force	Suborbital	Missile test	4 August	Successful
4 August; 03:41:10	Apogee: 1,300 kilometres (810 mi)					
4 August; 12:43:08	(United States) SM-65D Atlas		(United States) Vandenberg ABRES-B-1		(United States) US Air Force	
4 August; 12:43:08		US Air Force	Suborbital	REV Test	4 August	Successful
4 August; 12:43:08	Apogee: 1,800 kilometres (1,100 mi)					
4 August	(Canada) Martlet 2		Barbados		(Canada) (United States) DND/DoD	
4 August		DND/DoD	Suborbital	Aeronomy	4 August	Successful
4 August	Apogee: 100 kilometres (62 mi)					
5 August; 13:21:28	(United States) SM-65F Atlas		(United States) Vandenberg ABRES-A-2		(United States) US Air Force	
5 August; 13:21:28		US Air Force	Suborbital	REV Test	5 August	Successful
5 August; 13:21:28	Apogee: 1,400 kilometres (870 mi)					
6 August; 00:20	(Canada) Martlet 2		Barbados		(Canada) (United States) DND/DoD	
6 August; 00:20		DND/DoD	Suborbital	Aeronomy	6 August	Successful
6 August; 00:20	Apogee: 107 kilometres (66 mi)					
6 August; 06:44	(Canada) Martlet 2		Barbados		(Canada) (United States) DND/DoD	
6 August; 06:44		DND/DoD	Suborbital	Aeronomy	6 August	Successful
6 August; 06:44	Apogee: 106 kilometres (66 mi)					
7 August; 11:13	(United States) Nike-Cajun		(United States) Point Barrow		(United States) NASA	
7 August; 11:13		NASA	Suborbital	Aeronomy	7 August	Successful
7 August; 11:13	Apogee: 120 kilometres (75 mi)					
7 August; 12:00	(United States) Nike-Cajun		(Canada) Churchill		(United States) NASA	
7 August; 12:00		NASA	Suborbital	Aeronomy	7 August	Successful
7 August; 12:00	Apogee: 127 kilometres (79 mi)					
7 August; 18:30	(United States) Nike-Cajun		(United States) Wallops Island		(United States) NASA	
7 August; 18:30		Michigan	Suborbital	Aeronomy	7 August	Successful
7 August; 18:30	Apogee: 167 kilometres (104 mi)					
7 August; 19:39	(United States) Nike-Cajun		(United States) Point Barrow		(United States) NASA	
7 August; 19:39		NASA	Suborbital	Aeronomy	7 August	Successful
7 August; 19:39	Apogee: 127 kilometres (79 mi)					
7 August; 19:45	(United States) Nike-Cajun		(Canada) Churchill		(United States) NASA	
7 August; 19:45		NASA	Suborbital	Aeronomy	7 August	Successful
7 August; 19:45	Apogee: 118 kilometres (73 mi)					
7 August; 20:06	(United States) Nike-Cajun		(United States) Wallops Island		(United States) NASA	
7 August; 20:06		NASA	Suborbital	Aeronomy	7 August	Successful
7 August; 20:06	Apogee: 120 kilometres (75 mi)					
7 August	(Japan) Kappa-8		(Indonesia) Pameungpeuk		(Japan) ISAS	
7 August		ISAS	Suborbital	Aeronomy	7 August	Successful
7 August	Apogee: 100 kilometres (62 mi)					
7 August	(United States) Athena RTV		(United States) Green River Pad 2		(United States) US Air Force	
7 August		US Air Force	Suborbital	REV Test	7 August	Successful
7 August	Apogee: 200 kilometres (120 mi)					
7 August	(United States) Athena RTV		(United States) Green River Pad 1		(United States) US Air Force	
7 August		US Air Force	Suborbital	REV Test	7 August	Launch failure
7 August	Apogee: 200 kilometres (120 mi)					
8 August; 03:40	(United States) Nike-Cajun		(United States) Wallops Island		(United States) NASA	
8 August; 03:40		NASA	Suborbital	Aeronomy	8 August	Successful
8 August; 03:40	Apogee: 122 kilometres (76 mi)					
8 August; 04:00	(United States) Nike-Cajun		(Canada) Churchill		(United States) NASA	
8 August; 04:00		NASA	Suborbital	Aeronomy	8 August	Successful
8 August; 04:00	Apogee: 116 kilometres (72 mi)					
8 August; 04:15	(United States) Nike-Cajun		(United States) Point Barrow		(United States) NASA	
8 August; 04:15		NASA	Suborbital	Aeronomy	8 August	Successful
8 August; 04:15	Apogee: 124 kilometres (77 mi)					
8 August; 08:40	(United States) Nike-Cajun		(United States) Wallops Island		(United States) NASA	
8 August; 08:40		Michigan	Suborbital	Aeronomy	8 August	Successful
8 August; 08:40	Apogee: 165 kilometres (103 mi)					
8 August; 10:02	(United States) Nike-Cajun		(Canada) Churchill		(United States) NASA	
8 August; 10:02		NASA	Suborbital	Aeronomy	8 August	Successful
8 August; 10:02	Apogee: 125 kilometres (78 mi)					
8 August; 10:15	(United States) Nike-Cajun		(United States) Wallops Island		(United States) NASA	
8 August; 10:15		NASA	Suborbital	Aeronomy	8 August	Successful
8 August; 10:15	Apogee: 120 kilometres (75 mi)					
9 August; 10:10	(United States) Nike-Cajun		(United States) Point Barrow		(United States) NASA	
9 August; 10:10		NASA	Suborbital	Aeronomy	9 August	Successful
9 August; 10:10	Apogee: 124 kilometres (77 mi)					
10 August; 23:13	(United Kingdom) Skylark-7C		(Italy) Salto di Quirra		(Europe) ESRO	
10 August; 23:13		ROE	Suborbital	UV astronomy	10 August	Successful
10 August; 23:13	Apogee: 215 kilometres (134 mi)					
11 August; 01:35	(Japan) Kappa-8		(United States) (Sweden) Lapan		(Japan) ISAS	
11 August; 01:35		LAPAN	Suborbital	Aeronomy; Ionospheric	11 August	Successful
11 August; 01:35	Apogee: 191 kilometres (119 mi)					
11 August; 11:49	(United States) Nike-Cajun		(United States) White Sands		(United States) NASA	
11 August; 11:49		DUD	Suborbital	Aeronomy; Meteoroid research	11 August	Successful
11 August; 11:49	Apogee: 129 kilometres (80 mi)					
11 August; 19:01:01	(United States) UGM-27 Polaris A1		(United States) Cape Canaveral LC-29A		(United States) US Navy	
11 August; 19:01:01		US Navy	Suborbital	Missile test	11 August	Successful
11 August; 19:01:01	Apogee: 500 kilometres (310 mi)					
12 August; 17:15	(United States) Aerobee-150 (Hi)		(United States) White Sands LC-35		(United States) US Air Force	
12 August; 17:15		US Air Force	Suborbital	Solar	12 August	Successful
12 August; 17:15	Apogee: 241 kilometres (150 mi)					
13 August	(Soviet Union) R-36		(Soviet Union) Baikonur PU-33		(Soviet Union) RVSN	
13 August		RVSN	Suborbital	Missile test	13 August	Successful
13 August	Apogee: 1,000 kilometres (620 mi)					
16 August; 20:04:56	(United States) LGM-25C Titan II		(United States) Vandenberg LC-395C		(United States) Strategic Air Command	
16 August; 20:04:56		Strategic Air Command	Suborbital	Missile test	16 August	Successful
16 August; 20:04:56	Apogee: 1,300 kilometres (810 mi)					
17 August; 00:05:00	(Japan) Kappa-8		(United States) (Sweden) Lapan		(Japan) ISAS	
17 August; 00:05:00		LAPAN	Suborbital	Aeronomy	17 August	Successful
17 August; 00:05:00	Apogee: 100 kilometres (62 mi)					
18 August; 11:30	(United States) LGM-30F Minuteman II		(United States) Vandenberg LF-21		(United States) US Air Force	
18 August; 11:30		US Air Force	Suborbital	Missile test	18 August	Successful
18 August; 11:30	Apogee: 1,300 kilometres (810 mi)					
19 August; 01:40	(United States) Nike-Apache		(United States) Wallops Island		(United States) NASA	
19 August; 01:40		NASA	Suborbital	Aeronomy	19 August	Successful
19 August; 01:40	Apogee: 144 kilometres (89 mi)					
20 August	(United States) Athena RTV		(United States) Green River Pad 1		(United States) US Air Force	
20 August		US Air Force	Suborbital	REV Test	20 August	Launch failure
20 August	(United States) Athena RTV		(United States) Green River Pad 3		(United States) US Air Force	
20 August		US Air Force	Suborbital	REV Test	20 August	Successful
20 August	Apogee: 200 kilometres (120 mi)					
21 August	(Soviet Union) R-36		(Soviet Union) Baikonur PU-32		(Soviet Union) RVSN	
21 August		RVSN	Suborbital	Missile test	21 August	Launch failure
23 August; 20:00:27	(United States) LGM-30F Minuteman II		(United States) Cape Canaveral LC-31B		(United States) US Air Force	
23 August; 20:00:27		US Air Force	Suborbital	Missile test	23 August	Successful
23 August; 20:00:27	Apogee: 1,300 kilometres (810 mi)					
24 August; 16:37:28	(United States) LGM-30A Minuteman IA		(United States) Vandenberg LF-06		(United States) Strategic Air Command	
24 August; 16:37:28		Strategic Air Command	Suborbital	Missile test	24 August	Successful
24 August; 16:37:28	Apogee: 1,000 kilometres (620 mi)					
24 August; 21:59	(United States) Nike-Apache		(United States) Wallops Island		(United States) NASA	
24 August; 21:59		NASA	Suborbital	Ionospheric	24 August	Successful
24 August; 21:59	Apogee: 162 kilometres (101 mi)					
24 August	(France) Dragon		(Norway) Myrdalsandir		(France) CNES	
24 August		CNRS	Suborbital	Aeronomy; Ionospheric	24 August	Successful
24 August	Apogee: 440 kilometres (270 mi)					
25 August; 16:28:07	(United States) LGM-30A Minuteman IA		(United States) Vandenberg LF-04		(United States) Strategic Air Command	
25 August; 16:28:07		Strategic Air Command	Suborbital	Missile test	25 August	Successful
25 August; 16:28:07	Apogee: 1,300 kilometres (810 mi)					
25 August; 18:31	(United States) Javelin		(United States) Wallops Island		(United States) NASA	
25 August; 18:31		Pittsburgh	Suborbital	Aeronomy	25 August	Successful
25 August; 18:31	Apogee: 902 kilometres (560 mi)					
26 August; 00:04:43	(United States) LGM-25C Titan II		(United States) Vandenberg LC-395D		(United States) Strategic Air Command	
26 August; 00:04:43		Strategic Air Command	Suborbital	Missile test	26 August	Successful
26 August; 00:04:43	Apogee: 1,300 kilometres (810 mi)					
26 August; 11:20:14	(United States) SM-65D Atlas		(United States) Vandenberg ABRES-B-2		(United States) US Air Force	
26 August; 11:20:14		US Air Force	Suborbital	REV Test	26 August	Successful
26 August; 11:20:14	Apogee: 1,800 kilometres (1,100 mi)					
26 August; 19:03	(United States) Aerobee-150 (Hi)		(United States) Eglin		(United States) US Air Force	
26 August; 19:03		AFCRL	Suborbital	Ionospheric	26 August	Successful
26 August; 19:03	Apogee: 109 kilometres (68 mi)					
27 August	(United States) Athena RTV		(United States) Green River Pad 2		(United States) US Air Force	
27 August		US Air Force	Suborbital	REV Test	27 August	Successful
27 August	Apogee: 200 kilometres (120 mi)					
28 August; 02:02	(Japan) Kappa 10S		(Japan) Kagoshima		(Japan) ISAS	
28 August; 02:02		ISAS	Suborbital	Ionospheric	28 August	Successful
28 August; 02:02	Apogee: 742 kilometres (461 mi)					
31 August	(Soviet Union) R-16U		(Soviet Union) Baikonur Site 60/8		(Soviet Union) RVSN	
31 August		RVSN	Suborbital	Missile test	31 August	Successful
31 August	Apogee: 1,210 kilometres (750 mi)					
August	(United States) Nike-Javelin		(United States) White Sands		(United States) DASA	
August		DASA	Suborbital	Aeronomy	August	Successful
August	Apogee: 100 kilometres (62 mi)					
=== September ===
1 September; 11:17	(United States) Nike-Apache		(United States) Wallops Island		(United States) NASA	
1 September; 11:17		UT Dallas	Suborbital	Ionospheric	1 September	Successful
1 September; 11:17	Apogee: 150 kilometres (93 mi)					
3 September; 05:17	(United States) Nike-Apache		(United States) Wallops Island		(United States) NASA	
3 September; 05:17		UT Dallas	Suborbital	Ionospheric	3 September	Successful
3 September; 05:17	Apogee: 153 kilometres (95 mi)					
3 September; 19:30	(Soviet Union) MR-12		(Soviet Union) Kapustin Yar		(Soviet Union) AN	
3 September; 19:30		AN	Suborbital	Aeronomy	3 September	Successful
3 September; 19:30	Apogee: 165 kilometres (103 mi)					
3 September	(France) Dragon		(Norway) Myrdalsandir		(France) CNES	
3 September		CNRS	Suborbital	Aeronomy; Ionospheric	3 September	Successful
3 September	Apogee: 451 kilometres (280 mi)					
9 September; 04:15	(Soviet Union) MR-12		(Soviet Union) Kapustin Yar		(Soviet Union) AN	
9 September; 04:15		AN	Suborbital	Aeronomy	9 September	Successful
9 September; 04:15	Apogee: 165 kilometres (103 mi)					
9 September; 04:20	(United Kingdom) Skylark 3		(Australia) Woomera LA-2		(United Kingdom) (Australia) RAE/WRE	
9 September; 04:20		RAE/WRE	Suborbital	Test flight	9 September	Successful
9 September; 04:20	Apogee: 221 kilometres (137 mi)					
9 September; 23:58	(United States) Nike-Apache		(United States) Wallops Island		(United States) NASA	
9 September; 23:58		NASA	Suborbital	Radio astronomy	9 September	Successful
9 September; 23:58	Apogee: 171 kilometres (106 mi)					
14 September; 05:45	(United States) Athena RTV		(United States) Green River Pad 1		(United States) US Air Force	
14 September; 05:45		US Air Force	Suborbital	REV Test	14 September	Successful
14 September; 05:45	Apogee: 200 kilometres (120 mi)					
14 September; 07:45	(United States) Athena RTV		(United States) Green River Pad 3		(United States) US Air Force	
14 September; 07:45		US Air Force	Suborbital	REV Test	14 September	Successful
14 September; 07:45	Apogee: 200 kilometres (120 mi)					
14 September	(Canada) Martlet 2		Barbados		(Canada) (United States) DND/DoD	
14 September		DND/DoD	Suborbital	Aeronomy	14 September	Successful
14 September	Apogee: 100 kilometres (62 mi)					
15 September; 20:28:00	(United States) Nike-Apache		(United States) Wallops Island		(United States) NASA	
15 September; 20:28:00		Urbana-Champaign	Suborbital	Ionospheric	15 September	Successful
15 September; 20:28:00	Apogee: 180 kilometres (110 mi)					
16 September; 14:04	(United States) Nike-Apache		(Canada) Churchill		(United States) NASA	
16 September; 14:04		CU-Boulder	Suborbital	Auroral	16 September	Launch failure
16 September; 14:04	Apogee: 27 kilometres (17 mi)					
16 September; 23:05	(Canada) Black Brant VB		(United States) Eglin		(United States) US Air Force	
16 September; 23:05		AFCRL	Suborbital	Test flight	16 September	Successful
16 September; 23:05	Apogee: 344 kilometres (214 mi)					
17 September; 15:44	(United States) Nike-Apache		(Canada) Churchill		(United States) NASA	
17 September; 15:44		CU-Boulder	Suborbital	Auroral	17 September	Successful
17 September; 15:44	Apogee: 160 kilometres (99 mi)					
17 September; 19:00	(Soviet Union) MR-12		(Soviet Union) Kapustin Yar		(Soviet Union) AN	
17 September; 19:00		AN	Suborbital	Aeronomy	17 September	Successful
17 September; 19:00	Apogee: 165 kilometres (103 mi)					
17 September; 21:51	(United States) Aerobee-150A		(United States) Wallops Island		(United States) NASA	
17 September; 21:51		CNES	Suborbital	Ionospheric	17 September	Successful
17 September; 21:51	Apogee: 182 kilometres (113 mi)					
17 September	(Soviet Union) UR-100		(Soviet Union) Baikonur Site 131		(Soviet Union) RVSN	
17 September		RVSN	Suborbital	Missile test	17 September	Launch failure
18 September; 22:02	(United States) Nike-Apache		(Netherlands) Coronie		(United States) NASA	
18 September; 22:02		UTR	Suborbital	Aeronomy	18 September	Successful
18 September; 22:02	Apogee: 205 kilometres (127 mi)					
18 September	(Soviet Union) R-16U		(Soviet Union) Baikonur Site 41/3		(Soviet Union) RVSN	
18 September		RVSN	Suborbital	Missile test	18 September	Successful
18 September	Apogee: 1,210 kilometres (750 mi)					
20 September; 03:27	(Soviet Union) R-5V Vertikal		(Soviet Union) Kapustin Yar		(Soviet Union) AN	
20 September; 03:27		AN	Suborbital	Ionospheric; Solar	20 September	Successful
20 September; 03:27	Apogee: 480 kilometres (300 mi)					
20 September; 14:10	(United States) Nike-Apache		(Canada) Churchill		(United States) NASA	
20 September; 14:10		CU-Boulder	Suborbital	Auroral	20 September	Launch failure
20 September; 14:10	Apogee: 20 kilometres (12 mi)					
20 September; 16:08	(United States) Nike-Apache		(Canada) Churchill		(United States) NASA	
20 September; 16:08		CU-Boulder	Suborbital	Auroral	20 September	Successful
20 September; 16:08	Apogee: 146 kilometres (91 mi)					
20 September; 23:30	(Canada) Martlet 2		Barbados		(Canada) (United States) DND/DoD	
20 September; 23:30		US Army	Suborbital	Aeronomy	20 September	Successful
20 September; 23:30	Apogee: 132 kilometres (82 mi)					
20 September	(United States) Athena RTV		(United States) Green River Pad 2		(United States) US Air Force	
20 September		US Air Force	Suborbital	REV Test	20 September	Successful
20 September	Apogee: 200 kilometres (120 mi)					
21 September; 00:52	(Canada) Martlet 2		Barbados		(Canada) (United States) DND/DoD	
21 September; 00:52		US Army	Suborbital	Aeronomy	21 September	Successful
21 September; 00:52	Apogee: 136 kilometres (85 mi)					
21 September; 04:24	(Canada) Martlet 2		Barbados		(Canada) (United States) DND/DoD	
21 September; 04:24		US Army	Suborbital	Aeronomy	21 September	Successful
21 September; 04:24	Apogee: 123 kilometres (76 mi)					
21 September; 06:21	(Canada) Martlet 2		Barbados		(Canada) (United States) DND/DoD	
21 September; 06:21		US Army	Suborbital	Aeronomy	21 September	Successful
21 September; 06:21	Apogee: 128 kilometres (80 mi)					
21 September; 07:35	(Canada) Martlet 2		Barbados		(Canada) (United States) DND/DoD	
21 September; 07:35		US Army	Suborbital	Aeronomy	21 September	Successful
21 September; 07:35	Apogee: 138 kilometres (86 mi)					
21 September; 09:00	(Canada) Martlet 2		Barbados		(Canada) (United States) DND/DoD	
21 September; 09:00		US Army	Suborbital	Aeronomy	21 September	Successful
21 September; 09:00	Apogee: 123 kilometres (76 mi)					
21 September; 14:04:23	(United States) LGM-25C Titan II		(United States) Vandenberg LC-395B		(United States) Strategic Air Command	
21 September; 14:04:23		Strategic Air Command	Suborbital	Missile test	21 September	Successful
21 September; 14:04:23	Apogee: 1,300 kilometres (810 mi)					
21 September; 22:00	(United States) Nike-Apache		(Netherlands) Coronie		(United States) NASA	
21 September; 22:00		UTR	Suborbital	Aeronomy	21 September	Successful
21 September; 22:00	Apogee: 205 kilometres (127 mi)					
22 September; 20:07	(United States) Aerobee-150 (Hi)		(United States) White Sands LC-35		(United States) NASA	
22 September; 20:07		ASE	Suborbital	XR astronomy	22 September	Successful
22 September; 20:07	Apogee: 199 kilometres (124 mi)					
22 September; 23:24	(Canada) Martlet 2		Barbados		(Canada) (United States) DND/DoD	
22 September; 23:24		US Army	Suborbital	Aeronomy	22 September	Successful
22 September; 23:24	Apogee: 127 kilometres (79 mi)					
23 September; 05:50	(Canada) Martlet 2		Barbados		(Canada) (United States) DND/DoD	
23 September; 05:50		US Army	Suborbital	Aeronomy	23 September	Successful
23 September; 05:50	Apogee: 126 kilometres (78 mi)					
23 September; 07:15	(Canada) Martlet 2		Barbados		(Canada) (United States) DND/DoD	
23 September; 07:15		US Army	Suborbital	Aeronomy	23 September	Successful
23 September; 07:15	Apogee: 133 kilometres (83 mi)					
23 September; 08:07	(Canada) Martlet 2		Barbados		(Canada) (United States) DND/DoD	
23 September; 08:07		US Army	Suborbital	Aeronomy	23 September	Successful
23 September; 08:07	Apogee: 126 kilometres (78 mi)					
23 September; 09:05	(Canada) Martlet 2		Barbados		(Canada) (United States) DND/DoD	
23 September; 09:05		US Army	Suborbital	Aeronomy	23 September	Successful
23 September; 09:05	Apogee: 124 kilometres (77 mi)					
23 September; 14:36	(United States) Javelin		(United States) Wallops Island		(United States) NASA	
23 September; 14:36		NASA	Suborbital	Ionospheric	23 September	Successful
23 September; 14:36	Apogee: 805 kilometres (500 mi)					
24 September; 08:52	(United States) Nike-Apache		(Netherlands) Coronie		(United States) NASA	
24 September; 08:52		UTR	Suborbital	Aeronomy	24 September	Successful
24 September; 08:52	Apogee: 205 kilometres (127 mi)					
25 September; 02:20:13	(United States) LGM-30F Minuteman II		(United States) Cape Canaveral LC-32B		(United States) US Air Force	
25 September; 02:20:13		US Air Force	Suborbital	Missile test	25 September	Successful
25 September; 02:20:13	Apogee: 1,300 kilometres (810 mi)					
25 September; 04:00	(United States) Aerobee-150 (Hi)		(United States) White Sands LC-35		(United States) US Air Force	
25 September; 04:00		AFCRL	Suborbital	Test flight	25 September	Successful
25 September; 04:00	Apogee: 199 kilometres (124 mi)					
25 September; 21:54	(United States) Aerobee-150A		(United States) Wallops Island		(United States) NASA	
25 September; 21:54		CNES	Suborbital	Ionospheric	25 September	Successful
25 September; 21:54	Apogee: 192 kilometres (119 mi)					
25 September	(Soviet Union) UR-100		(Soviet Union) Baikonur		(Soviet Union) RVSN	
25 September		RVSN	Suborbital	Missile test	25 September	Launch failure
25 September	(Soviet Union) R-16U		(Soviet Union) Baikonur Site 41/3		(Soviet Union) RVSN	
25 September		RVSN	Suborbital	Missile test	25 September	Successful
25 September	Apogee: 1,210 kilometres (750 mi)					
25 September	(Canada) Martlet 2		Barbados		(Canada) (United States) DND/DoD	
25 September		DND/DoD	Suborbital	Aeronomy	25 September	Successful
25 September	Apogee: 100 kilometres (62 mi)					
27 September; 08:54	(United States) Nike-Apache		(Netherlands) Coronie		(United States) NASA	
27 September; 08:54		UTR	Suborbital	Aeronomy	27 September	Successful
27 September; 08:54	Apogee: 205 kilometres (127 mi)					
27 September	(United States) Athena RTV		(United States) Green River Pad 1		(United States) US Air Force	
27 September		US Air Force	Suborbital	REV Test	27 September	Successful
27 September	Apogee: 200 kilometres (120 mi)					
28 September; 09:09:58	(United States) Aerobee-150 (Hi)		(United States) White Sands LC-35/21		(United States) NASA	
28 September; 09:09:58		NASA	Suborbital	Meteoroid research Biological	28 September	Successful
28 September; 09:09:58	Apogee: 183 kilometres (114 mi)					
28 September; 14:35	(United Kingdom) Black Knight 301		(Australia) Woomera LA-5		(United Kingdom) RAE	
28 September; 14:35		RAE	Suborbital	REV Test	28 September	Successful
28 September; 14:35	Apogee: 605 kilometres (376 mi)					
29 September; 10:40	(United States) SM-65D Atlas		(United States) Vandenberg ABRES-B-1		(United States) US Air Force	
29 September; 10:40		US Air Force	Suborbital	REV Test	29 September	Successful
29 September; 10:40	Apogee: 1,800 kilometres (1,100 mi)					
29 September	(United States) Aerobee-150 (Hi)		(United States) White Sands LC-35		(United States) NRL	
29 September		NRL	Suborbital	Aeronomy	29 September	Successful
29 September	Apogee: 200 kilometres (120 mi)					
30 September; 04:20	(United Kingdom) Skylark-7C		(Italy) Salto di Quirra		(Europe) ESRO	
30 September; 04:20		UCL/MPE	Suborbital	Aeronomy	30 September	Successful
30 September; 04:20	Apogee: 225 kilometres (140 mi)					
30 September; 04:20	(France) Rubis		(Algeria) Hammaguira Bacchus		(France) CNES	
30 September; 04:20		CNRS	Suborbital	Astronomy; Particle research	30 September	Successful
30 September; 04:20	Apogee: 1,760 kilometres (1,090 mi)					
30 September	(Soviet Union) R-16U		(Soviet Union) Baikonur Site 41/4		(Soviet Union) RVSN	
30 September		RVSN	Suborbital	Missile test	30 September	Successful
30 September	Apogee: 1,210 kilometres (750 mi)					
September	(Soviet Union) RT-1		(Soviet Union) Kapustin Yar		(Soviet Union) RVSN	
September		RVSN	Suborbital	Missile test	September	Launch failure
September	Apogee: 10 kilometres (6.2 mi)					
September	(Soviet Union) RT-15		(Soviet Union) Kapustin Yar Site 84		(Soviet Union) RVSN	
September		RVSN	Suborbital	Missile test	September	Successful
September	Apogee: 1,000 kilometres (620 mi)					
September	(Canada) Martlet 2		Barbados		(Canada) (United States) DND/DoD	
September		DND/DoD	Suborbital	Aeronomy	September	Successful
September	Apogee: 100 kilometres (62 mi)					
September	(Canada) Martlet 2		Barbados		(Canada) (United States) DND/DoD	
September		DND/DoD	Suborbital	Aeronomy	September	Successful
September	Apogee: 100 kilometres (62 mi)					
September	(Canada) Martlet 2		Barbados		(Canada) (United States) DND/DoD	
September		DND/DoD	Suborbital	Aeronomy	September	Successful
September	Apogee: 100 kilometres (62 mi)					
September	(Canada) Martlet 2		Barbados		(Canada) (United States) DND/DoD	
September		DND/DoD	Suborbital	Aeronomy	September	Successful
September	Apogee: 100 kilometres (62 mi)					
September	(Canada) Martlet 2		Barbados		(Canada) (United States) DND/DoD	
September		DND/DoD	Suborbital	Aeronomy	September	Successful
September	Apogee: 100 kilometres (62 mi)					
September	(Canada) Martlet 2		Barbados		(Canada) (United States) DND/DoD	
September		DND/DoD	Suborbital	Aeronomy	September	Successful
September	Apogee: 100 kilometres (62 mi)					
September	(Canada) Martlet 2		Barbados		(Canada) (United States) DND/DoD	
September		DND/DoD	Suborbital	Aeronomy	September	Successful
September	Apogee: 100 kilometres (62 mi)					

- ← Jan
- Feb
- Mar
- Apr
- May
- Jun
- Jul
- Aug
- Sep
- Oct
- Nov
- Dec →
