= Kosmos 70 =

Soviet artificial satellite

- Mission type: Technology; Radiation
- COSPAR ID: 1965-052A
- SATCAT no.: 01431
- Mission duration: 534 days

Spacecraft properties
- Spacecraft type: DS-A1
- Manufacturer: Yuzhnoye
- Launch mass: 250 kg

Start of mission
- Launch date: 2 July 1965, 06:28:00 GMT
- Rocket: Kosmos-2I 63S1
- Launch site: Kapustin Yar, Site 86/1

End of mission
- Decay date: 18 December 1966

Orbital parameters
- Reference system: Geocentric
- Regime: Low Earth
- Perigee altitude: 215 km
- Apogee altitude: 1147 km
- Inclination: 48.8°
- Period: 98.3 minutes
- Epoch: 2 July 1965

Kosmos 70 (Russian: Космос 70 meaning Cosmos 70), also known as DS-A1 No.7 was a technology demonstration satellite which was launched by the Soviet Union in 1965 as part of the Dnepropetrovsk Sputnik programme. Its primary mission was to demonstrate technologies for future Soviet military satellites. It also conducted radiation experiments.

It was launched aboard a Kosmos-2I 63S1 rocket, flying Site 86/1 at Kapustin Yar. The launch occurred at 06:28 GMT on 2 July 1965.

Kosmos 70 was placed into a low Earth orbit with a perigee of 215 kilometres (134 mi), an apogee of 1,147 kilometres (713 mi), an 48.8° of inclination, and an orbital period of 98.3 minutes. It decayed on 18 December 1966. Kosmos 70 was the last of seven DS-A1 satellites to be launched, of which four; Kosmos 11, Kosmos 17, Kosmos 53 and Kosmos 70, reached orbit. As with earlier DS-A1 satellites, the technological experiments aboard Kosmos 70 were tests of communications and navigation systems which were later used on the GLONASS system.

== See also ==
- 1965 in spaceflight
