= 1965 in spaceflight (January–March) =

This is a list of spaceflights launched between January and March 1965. For launches in the rest of the year, see 1965 in spaceflight (April–June), 1965 in spaceflight (July–September) and 1965 in spaceflight (October–December). For an overview of the whole year, see 1965 in spaceflight.

== Orbital launches ==
- ← Jan
- Feb
- Mar
- Apr
- May
- Jun
- Jul
- Aug
- Sep
- Oct
- Nov
- Dec →

Date and time (UTC)	Rocket	Flight number	Launch site		LSP	
Date and time (UTC)	Payload (⚀ = CubeSat)	Operator	Orbit	Function	Decay (UTC)	Outcome
Date and time (UTC)	Remarks					
=== January ===
11 January; 09:36	(Soviet Union) Vostok-2		(Soviet Union) Baikonur Site 31/6		(Soviet Union) RVSN	
11 January; 09:36	(Soviet Union) Kosmos 52 (Zenit-2 №25)	GRU	Low Earth	Optical imaging	19 January	Successful
15 January; 21:00:44	(United States) Thrust Augmented Thor SLV-2A Agena-D		(United States) Vandenberg LC-75-3-5		(United States) US Air Force	
15 January; 21:00:44	(United States) OPS 3928 (KH-4A 16/1016)	US Air Force/NRO	Low Earth	Optical imaging	9 February	Partial spacecraft failure
15 January; 21:00:44	(United States) SRV 665	US Air Force/NRO	Low Earth	Film return	15 January	Successful
15 January; 21:00:44	(United States) SRV 666	US Air Force/NRO	Low Earth	Film return	20 January	Successful
15 January; 21:00:44	Camera issues caused some images to appear smeared.					
19 January; 05:03:42	(United States) Thor LV-2D MG-18		(United States) Vandenberg LC-4300B-6		(United States) US Air Force	
19 January; 05:03:42	(United States) OPS 7040 (DSAP-1 F10/P-35 10)	US Air Force	Sun-synchronous	Weather	13 July 1979	Partial spacecraft failure
19 January; 05:03:42	Thermal regulation problem due to heat shield deployment issues, maiden flight of Thor LV-2D MG-18.					
21 January; 21:34:54	(United States) Atlas D		(United States) Vandenberg LC-576B-3		(United States) US Air Force	
21 January; 21:34:54		US Air Force	Suborbital	REV test	28 May	Successful
21 January; 21:34:54	(United States) OV1-1	US Air Force	Intended: Low Earth	Radiation	28 May	Launch failure
21 January; 21:34:54	OV1 pod failed to separate from Atlas.					
22 January; 07:52:00	(United States) Delta C		(United States) Cape Canaveral LC-17A		(United States) NASA	
22 January; 07:52:00	(United States) Tiros 9 (Tiros I/A-54)	NASA (1965); ESSA (1965–1968)	Sun-synchronous	Weather	In orbit	Successful
22 January; 07:52:00	Ceased operations on 12 June 1968.					
23 January; 20:09	(United States) Atlas SLV-3 Agena-D		(United States) Vandenberg PALC-2-3		(United States) US Air Force	
23 January; 20:09	(United States) OPS 4703 (KH-7 15/4015/AFP-206 SV-965)	US Air Force/NRO	Low Earth	Optical imaging	29 January	Successful
30 January; 09:36	(Soviet Union) Kosmos 63S1		(Soviet Union) Kapustin Yar Site 86/1		(Soviet Union)	
30 January; 09:36	(Soviet Union) Kosmos 53 (DS-A1 №5)		Low Earth	Technology/Radiation	12 August 1966	Successful
← Jan; Feb; Mar; Apr; May; Jun; Jul; Aug; Sep; Oct; Nov; Dec →; === February ===
3 February; 16:36:00	(United States) Delta C		(United States) Cape Canaveral LC-17B		(United States) NASA	
3 February; 16:36:00	(United States) OSO-2 (OSO-B2/S-17)	NASA	Low Earth	Solar	9 August 1989	Successful
3 February; 16:36:00	Ceased operations on 6 June 1966.					
11 February; 15:19:05	(United States) Titan IIIA / Star-13A		(United States) Cape Canaveral LC-20		(United States) US Air Force	
11 February; 15:19:05	(United States) LES-1	Lincoln	Intended: Highly elliptical Achieved: Medium Earth	Technology	In orbit	Spacecraft failure
11 February; 15:19:05	Intentionally launched into medium Earth orbit, spacecraft was to manoeuvre to final orbit by itself using a Star-13A motor, but failed to do so.					
12 February	(Soviet Union) Kosmos 63S1		(Soviet Union) Kapustin Yar Site 86/1		(Soviet Union)	
12 February	(Soviet Union) DS-P1-Yu №2		Intended: Low Earth	Radar target	12 February	Launch failure
12 February	Second stage malfunctioned, failed to achieve orbit.					
16 February; 14:37:03	(United States) Saturn I		(United States) Cape Canaveral LC-37B		(United States) NASA	
16 February; 14:37:03	(United States) Apollo BP-16	NASA	Low Earth	Technology	10 July 1985	Successful
16 February; 14:37:03	(United States) Pegasus 1	NASA	Low Earth	Micrometeoroids	17 September 1978	Successful
16 February; 14:37:03	Boilerplate test of Apollo spacecraft, Pegasus ceased operations on 29 August 1968.					
17 February; 17:05:00	(United States) Atlas LV-3A Agena-B		(United States) Cape Canaveral LC-12		(United States) US Air Force	
17 February; 17:05:00	(United States) Ranger 8	NASA	Highly elliptical	Lunar impactor	20 February; 09:57:37	Successful
20 February	(Soviet Union) Kosmos 63S1		(Soviet Union) Kapustin Yar Site 86/1		(Soviet Union)	
20 February	(Soviet Union) DS-A1 №6		Intended: Low Earth	Technology/Radiation	+64 seconds	Launch failure
20 February	First stage malfunctioned, failed to achieve orbit					
21 February; 11:00	(Soviet Union) Kosmos-1		(Soviet Union) Baikonur Site 41/15		(Soviet Union)	
21 February; 11:00	(Soviet Union) Kosmos 54 (Strela-1 №9)		Low Earth	Communication	15 September 1968	Successful
21 February; 11:00	(Soviet Union) Kosmos 55 (Strela-1 №10)		Low Earth	Communication	2 February 1968	Successful
21 February; 11:00	(Soviet Union) Kosmos 56 (Strela-1 №11)		Low Earth	Communication	2 November 1967	Successful
22 February; 07:40:47	(Soviet Union) Voskhod		(Soviet Union) Baikonur Site 31/6		(Soviet Union)	
22 February; 07:40:47	(Soviet Union) Kosmos 57 (Voskhod 3KD №1)		Low Earth	Test flight	22 February	Spacecraft failure
22 February; 07:40:47	Accidentally commanded to deorbit and self-destruct shortly after launch.					
25 February; 21:44:55	(United States) Thrust Augmented Thor SLV-2A Agena-D		(United States) Vandenberg PALC-1-1		(United States) US Air Force	
25 February; 21:44:55	(United States) OPS 4782 (KH-4A 17/1017)	US Air Force/NRO	Low Earth	Optical imaging	18 March	Partial spacecraft failure
25 February; 21:44:55	(United States) SRV 623	US Air Force/NRO	Low Earth	Film return	February/March	Successful
25 February; 21:44:55	(United States) SRV 625	US Air Force/NRO	Low Earth	Film return	February/March	Successful
25 February; 21:44:55	Shutter failed towards end of mission.					
26 February; 05:02	(Soviet Union) Vostok-2M		(Soviet Union) Baikonur Site 31/6		(Soviet Union) RVSN	
26 February; 05:02	(Soviet Union) Kosmos 58 (Meteor №2)	VNIEM	Low Earth	Weather	25 February 1990	Successful
← Jan; Feb; Mar; Apr; May; Jun; Jul; Aug; Sep; Oct; Nov; Dec →; === March ===
2 March; 13:25	(United States) Atlas LV-3C Centaur-C	AC-5	(United States) Canaveral LC-36A		(United States) NASA	
2 March; 13:25	(United States) Surveyor SD-1	NASA	Intended: Geosynchronous transfer	Technology	+2 seconds	Launch failure
2 March; 13:25	Fuel valves closed after launch causing engines to shut down, rocket fell back and exploded on launch pad, final flight of Atlas LV-3C Centaur-C.					
7 March; 09:07	(Soviet Union) Voskhod		(Soviet Union) Baikonur Site 31/6		(Soviet Union)	
7 March; 09:07	(Soviet Union) Kosmos 59 (Zenit-4 №5)	GRU	Low Earth	Optical imaging	15 March	Successful
7 March; 09:07	Carried prototype Voskhod 3KD airlock.					
9 March; 18:29:47	(United States) Thor SLV-2 Agena-D		(United States) Vandenberg LC-75-1-2		(United States) US Air Force	
9 March; 18:29:47	(United States) Poppy 4A (SOLRAD 7B)	NRL	Low Earth	Radiation	In orbit	Successful
9 March; 18:29:47	(United States) GRAB-6 (NRL-PL 142/Poppy 4B)	NRL	Low Earth	ELINT	In orbit	Successful
9 March; 18:29:47	(United States) Poppy 4C (GGSE-2)	NRL	Low Earth	Technology	In orbit	Successful
9 March; 18:29:47	(United States) Poppy 4D (GGSE-3)	NRL	Low Earth	Technology	In orbit	Successful
9 March; 18:29:47	(United States) Secor-3 (EGRS-3)	US Army	Low Earth	Geodesy	In orbit	Successful
9 March; 18:29:47	(United States) Surcal 4	NRL	Low Earth	Calibration	27 March 1981	Successful
9 March; 18:29:47	(United States) Dodecapole 1	NRL	Low Earth	Calibration	In orbit	Successful
9 March; 18:29:47	(United States) OSCAR 3		Low Earth	Amateur radio	In orbit	Successful
9 March; 18:29:47	NRL Composite 5					
11 March; 13:39:59	(United States) Thor DSV-2A Ablestar		(United States) Vandenberg LC-75-1-1		(United States) US Air Force	
11 March; 13:39:59	(United States) OPS 7087 (Transit O-3/NNS 30030)	US Navy	Low Earth	Navigation	14 June	Spacecraft failure
11 March; 13:39:59	(United States) Secor-2 (EGRS-2)	US Army	Low Earth	Geodesy	26 February 1968	Successful
11 March; 13:39:59	Transit O-3 failed a few weeks after launch.					
12 March; 09:30	(Soviet Union) Molniya-L		(Soviet Union) Baikonur Site 1/5		(Soviet Union)	
12 March; 09:30	(Soviet Union) Kosmos 60 (Luna E-6 №9)		Intended: Highly elliptical Achieved: Low Earth	Lunar lander	17 March	Launch failure
12 March; 09:30	Escape stage engine failed to ignite due to power system malfunction.					
12 March; 19:25	(United States) Atlas SLV-3 Agena-D		(United States) Vandenberg PALC-2-3		(United States) US Air Force	
12 March; 19:25	(United States) OPS 4920 (KH-7 16/AFP-206 SV-966)	US Air Force/NRO	Low Earth	Optical imaging	17 March	Successful
15 March; 11:00	(Soviet Union) Kosmos-1		(Soviet Union) Baikonur Site 41/15		(Soviet Union)	
15 March; 11:00	(Soviet Union) Kosmos 61 (Strela-1 №12)		Low Earth	Communication	15 January 1968	Successful
15 March; 11:00	(Soviet Union) Kosmos 62 (Strela-1 №13)		Low Earth	Communication	24 September 1968	Successful
15 March; 11:00	(Soviet Union) Kosmos 63 (Strela-1 №14)		Low Earth	Communication	4 November 1967	Successful
18 March; 04:43:46	(United States) Thor LV-2D MG-18		(United States) Vandenberg LC-4300B-6		(United States) US Air Force	
18 March; 04:43:46	(United States) OPS 7353 (DSAP-1 F11)	US Air Force	Sun-synchronous	Weather	31 December 1989	Successful
18 March; 04:43:46	Final flight of Thor LV-2D MG-18.					
18 March; 07:00:00	(Soviet Union) Voskhod		(Soviet Union) Baikonur Site 1/5		(Soviet Union)	
18 March; 07:00:00	(Soviet Union) Voskhod 2		Low Earth	Technology	19 March; 09:02:17	Successful
18 March; 07:00:00	Manned flight with two cosmonauts, Alexei Leonov became the first man to perform an extra-vehicular activity.					
21 March; 21:37:02	(United States) Atlas LV-3A Agena-B		(United States) Cape Canaveral LC-12		(United States) US Air Force	
21 March; 21:37:02	(United States) Ranger 9	NASA	Highly elliptical	Lunar impactor	24 March; 14:08:20	Successful
21 March; 21:37:02	Final flight of Atlas LV-3A Agena-B.					
23 March; 14:24:00	(United States) Titan II GLV		(United States) Cape Canaveral LC-19		(United States) US Air Force	
23 March; 14:24:00	(United States) Gemini III	NASA	Low Earth	Test flight	19:16:31	Successful
23 March; 14:24:00	Carried two astronauts, first manned Gemini mission.					
25 March; 10:04	(Soviet Union) Vostok-2		(Soviet Union) Baikonur Site 31/6		(Soviet Union)	
25 March; 10:04	(Soviet Union) Kosmos 64 (Zenit-2 №26)		Low Earth	Optical imaging	2 April	Successful
25 March; 21:11:17	(United States) Thrust Augmented Thor SLV-2A Agena-D		(United States) Vandenberg LC-75-3-4		(United States) US Air Force	
25 March; 21:11:17	(United States) OPS 4803 (KH-4A 18/1018)	US Air Force/NRO	Sun-synchronous	Optical imaging	5 April	Successful
25 March; 21:11:17	(United States) SRV 668	US Air Force/NRO	Sun-synchronous	Film return	March	Successful
25 March; 21:11:17	(United States) SRV 669	US Air Force/NRO	Sun-synchronous	Film return	March/April	Successful
← Jan; Feb; Mar; Apr; May; Jun; Jul; Aug; Sep; Oct; Nov; Dec →
For flights after 31 March, see 1965 in spaceflight (April-June)

== Suborbital launches ==
- ← Jan
- Feb
- Mar
- Apr
- May
- Jun
- Jul
- Aug
- Sep
- Oct
- Nov
- Dec →

Date and time (UTC)	Rocket	Flight number	Launch site		LSP	
Date and time (UTC)	Payload (⚀ = CubeSat)	Operator	Orbit	Function	Decay (UTC)	Outcome
Date and time (UTC)	Remarks					
=== January ===
7 January; 03:50	(United States) Nike-Apache		(United States) Wallops Island		(United States) NASA	
7 January; 03:50		NASA	Suborbital	Aeronomy	7 January	Successful
7 January; 03:50	Apogee: 146 kilometres (91 mi)					
7 January	(United States) Hydra-Iris		(United States) USNS Wheeling, AO-5		(United States) US Navy	
7 January		NASA	Suborbital	Ionospheric; Magnetospheric	7 January	Launch failure
7 January	Apogee: 2 kilometres (1.2 mi)					
8 January; 18:59:54	(United States) SM-65F Atlas		(United States) Vandenberg LC-576G		(United States) Strategic Air Command	
8 January; 18:59:54		Strategic Air Command	Suborbital	Missile test	8 January	Successful
8 January; 18:59:54	Apogee: 1,400 kilometres (870 mi)					
8 January	(Soviet Union) R-14 Chusovaya		(Soviet Union) Kapustin Yar		(Soviet Union) RVSN	
8 January		RVSN	Suborbital	Missile test	8 January	Successful
8 January	Apogee: 675 kilometres (419 mi)					
11 January; 17:13:03	(United States) UGM-27 Polaris A3		(United States) USS Von Steuben, ETR		(United States) US Navy	
11 January; 17:13:03		US Navy	Suborbital	Missile test	11 January	Successful
11 January; 17:13:03	Apogee: 1,000 kilometres (620 mi)					
12 January; 14:32:26	(United States) SM-65D Atlas		(United States) Vandenberg LC-576B-1		(United States) Strategic Air Command	
12 January; 14:32:26		Strategic Air Command	Suborbital	Target	12 January	Successful
12 January; 14:32:26	Apogee: 1,800 kilometres (1,100 mi)					
13 January; 05:02	(Soviet Union) R-36		(Soviet Union) Baikonur Site 80/17		(Soviet Union) RVSN	
13 January; 05:02		RVSN	Suborbital	Missile test	13 January	Launch failure
13 January; 15:49	(United States) Aerobee-150 (Hi)		(United States) White Sands LC-35		(United States) KPNO	
13 January; 15:49		KPNO	Suborbital	Aeronomy	13 January	Successful
13 January; 15:49	Apogee: 228 kilometres (142 mi)					
13 January; 17:12	(United States) Javelin		(United States) Wallops Island		(United States) NASA	
13 January; 17:12		PSU	Suborbital	Ionospheric	13 January	Successful
13 January; 17:12	Apogee: 1,006 kilometres (625 mi)					
13 January; 23:48	(United States) Aerobee-150 (Hi)		(United States) Wallops Island		(United States) NASA	
13 January; 23:48		NASA	Suborbital	Aeronomy	13 January	Successful
13 January; 23:48	Apogee: 178 kilometres (111 mi)					
14 January; 12:00	(United States) HGM-25A Titan I		(United States) Vandenberg LC-395A-3		(United States) Strategic Air Command	
14 January; 12:00		Strategic Air Command	Suborbital	Missile test	14 January	Successful
14 January; 12:00	Apogee: 1,000 kilometres (620 mi)					
15 January; 15:00:03	(Soviet Union) R-17 Elbrus		(Soviet Union) Kapustin Yar		(Soviet Union) MVS	
15 January; 15:00:03		MVS	Suborbital	Missile test	15 January	Successful
15 January; 15:00:03	Apogee: 250 kilometres (160 mi)					
15 January	(United States) Athena RTV		(United States) Green River Pad 2		(United States) US Air Force	
15 January		US Air Force	Suborbital	REV Test	15 January	Successful
15 January	Apogee: 200 kilometres (120 mi)					
19 January; 14:04:00	(United States) Titan II GLV		(United States) Cape Canaveral LC-19		(United States) NASA	
19 January; 14:04:00	(United States) Gemini 2	NASA	Suborbital	Test flight	14:22:14	Successful
19 January; 14:04:00	Apogee: 169 kilometres (105 mi), test of the heat shield on the Gemini spacecraft					
20 January	(United States) LGM-30B Minuteman IB		(United States) Vandenberg LF-03		(United States) Strategic Air Command	
20 January		Strategic Air Command	Suborbital	Missile test	20 January	Successful
20 January	Apogee: 1,300 kilometres (810 mi)					
20 January	(United States) Tomahawk		(United States) Tonopah		(United States) Sandia	
20 January		Sandia	Suborbital	Aeronomy	20 January	Successful
20 January	Apogee: 106 kilometres (66 mi)					
21 January; 20:30	(United States) Aerobee-150 (Hi)		(United States) White Sands LC-35		(United States) NRL	
21 January; 20:30		NRL	Suborbital	Solar	21 January	Successful
21 January; 20:30	Apogee: 235 kilometres (146 mi)					
22 January; 05:14	(Japan) Kappa-9M		(Japan) Kagoshima		(Japan) ISAS	
22 January; 05:14		ISAS	Suborbital	Ionospheric	22 January	Successful
22 January; 05:14	Apogee: 350 kilometres (220 mi)					
22 January; 21:46	(Canada) Black Brant IVA		(Canada) Churchill		(Canada) CARDE	
22 January; 21:46		BAL	Suborbital	Test flight	22 January	Successful
22 January; 21:46	Apogee: 670 kilometres (420 mi)					
23 January; 16:30:08	(United States) UGM-27 Polaris A3		(United States) USS Sam Rayburn, ETR		(United States) US Navy	
23 January; 16:30:08		US Navy	Suborbital	Missile test	23 January	Successful
23 January; 16:30:08	Apogee: 1,000 kilometres (620 mi)					
23 January; 18:15	(Canada) Black Brant IVA		(Canada) Churchill		(Canada) CARDE	
23 January; 18:15		BAL	Suborbital	Test flight	23 January	Successful
23 January; 18:15	Apogee: 735 kilometres (457 mi)					
23 January	(Soviet Union) R-14 Chusovaya		(Soviet Union) Kapustin Yar		(Soviet Union) RVSN	
23 January		RVSN	Suborbital	Missile test	23 January	Successful
23 January	Apogee: 675 kilometres (419 mi)					
25 January; 16:00	(Canada) Black Brant IIB		(Canada) Churchill		(Canada) NRC	
25 January; 16:00		BAL	Suborbital	Test flight	25 January	Successful
25 January; 16:00	Apogee: 230 kilometres (140 mi)					
25 January; 20:53	(Canada) Black Brant IIB		(Canada) Churchill		(Canada) NRC	
25 January; 20:53		BAL	Suborbital	Test flight	25 January	Launch failure
25 January; 20:53	Apogee: 20 kilometres (12 mi)					
26 January; 09:40:26	(United States) Hydra-Iris		(United States) USNS Wheeling, AO-6		(United States) US Navy	
26 January; 09:40:26		US Navy	Suborbital	Ionospheric; Magnetospheric	26 January	Successful
26 January; 09:40:26	Apogee: 289 kilometres (180 mi)					
27 January; 20:30	(United States) Nike-Cajun		(United States) Point Barrow		(United States) NASA	
27 January; 20:30		NASA	Suborbital	Aeronomy	27 January	Successful
27 January; 20:30	Apogee: 100 kilometres (62 mi)					
27 January; 21:32	(United States) Nike-Cajun		(United States) Wallops Island		(United States) NASA	
27 January; 21:32		NASA	Suborbital	Aeronomy	27 January	Successful
27 January; 21:32	Apogee: 117 kilometres (73 mi)					
27 January	(United States) Nike-Tomahawk 9A		(United States) Barking Sands		(United States) Sandia	
27 January		Sandia	Suborbital	Test flight	27 January	Successful
27 January	Apogee: 302 kilometres (188 mi)					
28 January; 04:24	(United States) Nike-Cajun		(Canada) Churchill		(United States) NASA	
28 January; 04:24		NASA	Suborbital	Aeronomy	28 January	Successful
28 January; 04:24	Apogee: 125 kilometres (78 mi)					
28 January; 12:51:10	(United States) XRM-91 Blue Scout Junior		(United States) Cape Canaveral LC-18A		(United States) US Air Force	
28 January; 12:51:10		AFCRL	Suborbital	Magnetospheric	28 January	Launch failure
28 January; 12:51:10	Apogee: 200 kilometres (120 mi)					
28 January	(United States) MGM-31 Pershing I		(United States) Fort Wingate		(United States) US Army	
28 January		US Army	Suborbital	Missile test	28 January	Successful
28 January	Apogee: 250 kilometres (160 mi)					
29 January; 01:21:15	(United States) LGM-30F Minuteman II		(United States) Cape Canaveral LC-31B		(United States) US Air Force	
29 January; 01:21:15		US Air Force	Suborbital	Missile test	29 January	Successful
29 January; 01:21:15	Apogee: 1,300 kilometres (810 mi)					
30 January; 05:15	(Soviet Union) R-17 Elbrus		(Soviet Union) Kapustin Yar		(Soviet Union) MVS	
30 January; 05:15		MVS	Suborbital	Missile test	30 January	Successful
30 January; 05:15	Apogee: 206 kilometres (128 mi)					
30 January; 07:45	(United States) Aerobee-150 (Hi)		(United States) White Sands LC-35		(United States) NRL	
30 January; 07:45		NRL	Suborbital	IR Astronomy	30 January	Successful
30 January; 07:45	Apogee: 211 kilometres (131 mi)					
30 January; 08:04	(Soviet Union) R-36		(Soviet Union) Baikonur Site 67/22		(Soviet Union) RVSN	
30 January; 08:04		RVSN	Suborbital	Missile test	30 January	Successful
30 January; 08:04	Apogee: 1,493 kilometres (928 mi)					
31 January; 05:01	(Japan) Lambda 3		(Japan) Kagoshima LA-L		(Japan) ISAS	
31 January; 05:01		Osaka	Suborbital	Ionospheric	31 January	Successful
31 January; 05:01	Apogee: 1,040 kilometres (650 mi)					
January	(United States) Nike-Apache		(United States) White Sands		(United States) US Army	
January		US Army	Suborbital	Aeronomy	January	Successful
January	Apogee: 100 kilometres (62 mi)					
January	(United States) Nike-Apache		(United States) White Sands		(United States) US Army	
January		US Army	Suborbital	Aeronomy	January	Successful
January	Apogee: 100 kilometres (62 mi)					
January	(Soviet Union) R-14 Chusovaya		(Soviet Union) Kapustin Yar		(Soviet Union) RVSN	
January		RVSN	Suborbital	Missile test	January	Successful
January	Apogee: 675 kilometres (419 mi)					
=== February ===
1 February	(United States) Nike-Apache		(Sweden) Esrange		(Norway) NTNF	
1 February		NTNF	Suborbital	Auroral	1 February	Launch failure
1 February	(France) Jericho		(France) CERES		(France) Dassault	
1 February		Dassault	Suborbital	Missile test	1 February	Successful
1 February	Apogee: 100 kilometres (62 mi)					
2 February; 06:30	(United States) Athena RTV		(United States) Green River Pad 2		(United States) US Air Force	
2 February; 06:30		US Air Force	Suborbital	REV Test	2 February	Launch failure
2 February; 06:30	Apogee: 50 kilometres (31 mi)					
2 February; 09:57	(United States) HAD		(Australia) Woomera LA-2		(Australia) WRE	
2 February; 09:57		WRE	Suborbital	Aeronomy	2 February	Successful
2 February; 09:57	Apogee: 123 kilometres (76 mi)					
2 February	(United States) LGM-30B Minuteman IB		(United States) Vandenberg LF-08		(United States) Strategic Air Command	
2 February		Strategic Air Command	Suborbital	Missile test	2 February	Successful
2 February	Apogee: 1,300 kilometres (810 mi)					
2 February	(United States) LGM-30B Minuteman IB		(United States) Vandenberg LF-02		(United States) Strategic Air Command	
2 February		Strategic Air Command	Suborbital	Missile test	2 February	Successful
2 February	Apogee: 1,300 kilometres (810 mi)					
2 February	(United States) Nike-Javelin		(United States) White Sands		(United States) DASA	
2 February		DASA	Suborbital	Aeronomy	2 February	Successful
2 February	Apogee: 100 kilometres (62 mi)					
2 February	(United States) Tomahawk		(United States) Tonopah		(United States) Sandia	
2 February		Sandia	Suborbital	Aeronomy	2 February	Successful
2 February	Apogee: 106 kilometres (66 mi)					
3 February; 18:08	(United States) Nike-Apache		(United States) Wallops Island		(United States) NASA	
3 February; 18:08		New Hampshire	Suborbital	Plasma research	3 February	Successful
3 February; 18:08	Apogee: 141 kilometres (88 mi)					
3 February; 22:55	(United States) HAD		(Australia) Woomera LA-2		(Australia) WRE	
3 February; 22:55		Adelaide	Suborbital	Aeronomy	3 February	Successful
3 February; 22:55	Apogee: 100 kilometres (62 mi)					
3 February	(United States) MGM-31 Pershing I		(United States) Fort Wingate		(United States) US Army	
3 February		US Army	Suborbital	Missile test	3 February	Successful
3 February	Apogee: 250 kilometres (160 mi)					
3 February	(United States) MGM-31 Pershing I		(United States) Fort Wingate		(United States) US Army	
3 February		US Army	Suborbital	Missile test	3 February	Successful
3 February	Apogee: 250 kilometres (160 mi)					
3 February	(United States) Tomahawk		(United States) Tonopah		(United States) Sandia	
3 February		Sandia	Suborbital	Aeronomy	3 February	Successful
3 February	Apogee: 106 kilometres (66 mi)					
4 February; 04:45	(United States) Nike-Cajun		(United States) Point Barrow		(United States) NASA	
4 February; 04:45		NASA	Suborbital	Aeronomy	4 February	Successful
4 February; 04:45	Apogee: 121 kilometres (75 mi)					
4 February; 05:10	(United States) Nike-Cajun		(United States) Wallops Island		(United States) NASA	
4 February; 05:10		NASA	Suborbital	Aeronomy	4 February	Successful
4 February; 05:10	Apogee: 118 kilometres (73 mi)					
4 February; 17:34	(United States) Nike-Cajun		(Canada) Churchill		(United States) NASA	
4 February; 17:34		NASA	Suborbital	Aeronomy	4 February	Successful
4 February; 17:34	Apogee: 150 kilometres (93 mi)					
6 February; 05:01	(Japan) Kappa-9M		(Japan) Kagoshima		(Japan) ISAS	
6 February; 05:01		Osaka	Suborbital	Ionospheric	6 February	Successful
6 February; 05:01	Apogee: 325 kilometres (202 mi)					
6 February; 10:02	(Japan) Kappa-9M		(Japan) Kagoshima		(Japan) ISAS	
6 February; 10:02		TAO	Suborbital	Solar	6 February	Successful
6 February; 10:02	Apogee: 335 kilometres (208 mi)					
6 February; 10:19	(United States) Nike-Cajun		(United States) Eglin		(United States) US Air Force	
6 February; 10:19		AFCRL	Suborbital	Aeronomy	6 February	Successful
6 February; 10:19	Apogee: 100 kilometres (62 mi)					
6 February	(United States) UGM-27 Polaris A2		(United States) USS Woodrow Wilson, ETR		(United States) US Navy	
6 February		US Navy	Suborbital	Missile test	6 February	Successful
6 February	Apogee: 1,000 kilometres (620 mi)					
6 February	(United States) UGM-27 Polaris A2		(United States) USS Woodrow Wilson, ETR		(United States) US Navy	
6 February		US Navy	Suborbital	Missile test	6 February	Successful
6 February	Apogee: 1,000 kilometres (620 mi)					
6 February	(United States) UGM-27 Polaris A2		(United States) USS Woodrow Wilson, ETR		(United States) US Navy	
6 February		US Navy	Suborbital	Missile test	6 February	Successful
6 February	Apogee: 1,000 kilometres (620 mi)					
6 February	(United States) UGM-27 Polaris A2		(United States) USS Woodrow Wilson, ETR		(United States) US Navy	
6 February		US Navy	Suborbital	Missile test	6 February	Successful
6 February	Apogee: 1,000 kilometres (620 mi)					
8 February; 17:25:05	(United States) UGM-27 Polaris A3		(United States) USS Sam Rayburn, ETR		(United States) US Navy	
8 February; 17:25:05		US Navy	Suborbital	Missile test	8 February	Successful
8 February; 17:25:05	Apogee: 1,000 kilometres (620 mi)					
8 February; 22:15	(United States) Nike-Cajun		(United States) Point Barrow		(United States) NASA	
8 February; 22:15		NASA	Suborbital	Aeronomy	8 February	Successful
8 February; 22:15	Apogee: 124 kilometres (77 mi)					
8 February; 22:53	(United States) Nike-Cajun		(United States) Wallops Island		(United States) NASA	
8 February; 22:53		NASA	Suborbital	Aeronomy	8 February	Successful
8 February; 22:53	Apogee: 107 kilometres (66 mi)					
8 February; 22:58	(United States) Nike-Cajun		(Canada) Churchill		(United States) NASA	
8 February; 22:58		NASA	Suborbital	Aeronomy	8 February	Successful
8 February; 22:58	Apogee: 165 kilometres (103 mi)					
8 February	(United States) LGM-30B Minuteman IB		(United States) Vandenberg LF-09		(United States) Strategic Air Command	
8 February		Strategic Air Command	Suborbital	Missile test	8 February	Successful
8 February	Apogee: 1,300 kilometres (810 mi)					
11 February; 17:55	(United States) Aerobee-150 (Hi)		(United States) White Sands LC-35		(United States) US Air Force	
11 February; 17:55		US Air Force	Suborbital	Solar	11 February	Successful
11 February; 17:55	Apogee: 200 kilometres (120 mi)					
11 February			(Soviet Union) Kapustin Yar		(Soviet Union) MVS	
11 February		MVS	Suborbital	Missile test	11 February	Successful
11 February	Apogee: 200 kilometres (120 mi)					
12 February; 12:00:06	(Soviet Union) R-17 Elbrus		(Soviet Union) Kapustin Yar		(Soviet Union) MVS	
12 February; 12:00:06		MVS	Suborbital	Missile test	12 February	Successful
12 February; 12:00:06	Apogee: 250 kilometres (160 mi)					
12 February	(United States) Athena RTV		(United States) Green River Pad 3		(United States) US Air Force	
12 February		US Air Force	Suborbital	REV Test	12 February	Launch failure
12 February	(United States) MGM-31 Pershing I		(United States) Fort Wingate		(United States) US Army	
12 February		US Army	Suborbital	Missile test	12 February	Successful
12 February	Apogee: 250 kilometres (160 mi)					
12 February	(United States) UGM-27 Polaris A2		(United States) USS Thomas Jefferson, ETR		(United States) US Navy	
12 February		US Navy	Suborbital	Missile test	12 February	Successful
12 February	Apogee: 1,000 kilometres (620 mi)					
12 February	(United States) UGM-27 Polaris A2		(United States) USS Thomas Jefferson, ETR		(United States) US Navy	
12 February		US Navy	Suborbital	Missile test	12 February	Successful
12 February	Apogee: 1,000 kilometres (620 mi)					
15 February; 16:30:03	(United States) UGM-27 Polaris A3		(United States) USS John C. Calhoun, ETR		(United States) US Navy	
15 February; 16:30:03		US Navy	Suborbital	Missile test	15 February	Successful
15 February; 16:30:03	Apogee: 1,000 kilometres (620 mi)					
15 February	(United States) Nike-Apache		(Sweden) Esrange		(Norway) NTNF	
15 February		NTNF	Suborbital	Auroral	15 February	Launch failure
16 February; 05:00	(United States) Athena RTV		(United States) Green River Pad 1		(United States) US Air Force	
16 February; 05:00		US Air Force	Suborbital	REV Test	16 February	Launch failure
16 February; 05:00	Apogee: 10 kilometres (6.2 mi)					
18 February; 20:09	(United States) Nike-Apache		(Canada) Churchill		(United States) NASA	
18 February; 20:09		Michigan	Suborbital	Aeronomy	18 February	Successful
18 February; 20:09	Apogee: 195 kilometres (121 mi)					
19 February; 00:25	(United States) Nike-Apache		(United States) Eglin		(United States) US Air Force	
19 February; 00:25		AFCRL	Suborbital	Aeronomy	19 February	Successful
19 February; 00:25	Apogee: 161 kilometres (100 mi)					
19 February; 04:51:02	(United States) Aerobee-150 (Hi)		(Canada) Churchill		(United States) NASA	
19 February; 04:51:02		Johns Hopkins	Suborbital	Aeronomy	19 February	Successful
19 February; 04:51:02	Apogee: 159 kilometres (99 mi)					
19 February; 04:51:42	(United States) Nike-Tomahawk		(Canada) Churchill		(United States) Sandia	
19 February; 04:51:42		LASL	Suborbital	Auroral	19 February	Successful
19 February; 04:51:42	Apogee: 320 kilometres (200 mi)					
19 February; 09:17:31	(United States) Nike-Apache		(Canada) Churchill		(United States) NASA	
19 February; 09:17:31		Michigan	Suborbital	Aeronomy	19 February	Successful
19 February; 09:17:31	Apogee: 187 kilometres (116 mi)					
20 February; 06:30:02	(Soviet Union) R-17 Elbrus		(Soviet Union) Kapustin Yar		(Soviet Union) MVS	
20 February; 06:30:02		MVS	Suborbital	Missile test	20 February	Launch failure
23 February; 17:15	(United States) Nike-Javelin		(United States) Eglin		(United States) US Air Force	
23 February; 17:15		AFCRL	Suborbital	Aeronomy	23 February	Successful
23 February; 17:15	Apogee: 200 kilometres (120 mi)					
25 February	(United States) Nike-Apache		(United States) Eglin		(United States) US Air Force	
25 February		AFCRL	Suborbital	Aeronomy	25 February	Successful
25 February	Apogee: 200 kilometres (120 mi)					
26 February; 11:10	(United States) Nike-Apache		(United States) Eglin		(United States) US Air Force	
26 February; 11:10		AFCRL	Suborbital	Aeronomy	26 February	Successful
26 February; 11:10	Apogee: 150 kilometres (93 mi)					
26 February	(Soviet Union) R-16U		(Soviet Union) Baikonur Site 41/3		(Soviet Union) RVSN	
26 February		RVSN	Suborbital	Missile test	26 February	Successful
26 February	Apogee: 1,210 kilometres (750 mi)					
27 February; 11:11:16	(United States) SM-65D Atlas		(United States) Vandenberg LC-576A-1		(United States) Strategic Air Command	
27 February; 11:11:16		Strategic Air Command	Suborbital	REV Test	27 February	Successful
27 February; 11:11:16	Apogee: 1,800 kilometres (1,100 mi)					
27 February; 21:00	(United States) Nike-Apache		(United States) Eglin		(United States) US Air Force	
27 February; 21:00		AFCRL	Suborbital	Aeronomy	27 February	Successful
27 February; 21:00	Apogee: 157 kilometres (98 mi)					
27 February; 21:33	(United States) Nike-Cajun		(United States) USS Croatan, PO-11 LP-1		(United States) NASA	
27 February; 21:33		Michigan	Suborbital	Aeronomy	27 February	Successful
27 February; 21:33	Apogee: 100 kilometres (62 mi)					
27 February; 22:30	(United States) Nike-Apache		(United States) Eglin		(United States) US Air Force	
27 February; 22:30		AFCRL	Suborbital	Ionospheric	27 February	Successful
27 February; 22:30	Apogee: 132 kilometres (82 mi)					
27 February	(France) Emeraude VE121		(Algeria) Hammaguira Brigitte		(France) CNES	
27 February		CNES	Suborbital	Missile test	27 February	Successful
27 February	Apogee: 200 kilometres (120 mi)					
28 February; 00:21	(United States) Nike-Apache		(Canada) Churchill		(United States) NASA	
28 February; 00:21		GCA	Suborbital	Aeronomy; Ionospheric	28 February	Successful
28 February; 00:21	Apogee: 170 kilometres (110 mi)					
28 February; 03:30	(United States) Nike-Apache		(Canada) Churchill		(United States) NASA	
28 February; 03:30		GCA	Suborbital	Aeronomy	28 February	Launch failure
28 February; 03:30	Apogee: 5 kilometres (3.1 mi)					
28 February; 04:15	(United States) Nike-Apache		(United States) Eglin		(United States) US Air Force	
28 February; 04:15		AFCRL	Suborbital	Aeronomy	28 February	Successful
28 February; 04:15	Apogee: 145 kilometres (90 mi)					
28 February; 06:00	(United States) Nike-Apache		(Canada) Churchill		(United States) NASA	
28 February; 06:00		GCA	Suborbital	Aeronomy	28 February	Launch failure
28 February; 06:00	Apogee: 7 kilometres (4.3 mi)					
28 February; 09:15	(United States) Nike-Apache		(United States) Eglin		(United States) US Air Force	
28 February; 09:15		AFCRL	Suborbital	Aeronomy	28 February	Successful
28 February; 09:15	Apogee: 200 kilometres (120 mi)					
28 February; 09:15	(United States) Nike-Apache		(United States) Eglin		(United States) US Air Force	
28 February; 09:15		AFCRL	Suborbital	Aeronomy	28 February	Successful
28 February; 09:15	Apogee: 143 kilometres (89 mi)					
28 February; 11:30	(United States) Nike-Apache		(United States) Eglin		(United States) US Air Force	
28 February; 11:30		AFCRL	Suborbital	Ionospheric	28 February	Launch failure
28 February; 11:30	Apogee: 28 kilometres (17 mi)					
28 February; 11:30	(United States) Nike-Apache		(United States) Eglin		(United States) US Air Force	
28 February; 11:30		AFCRL	Suborbital	Aeronomy	28 February	Successful
28 February; 11:30	Apogee: 139 kilometres (86 mi)					
28 February; 12:11	(United States) Nike-Apache		(Canada) Churchill		(United States) NASA	
28 February; 12:11		GCA	Suborbital	Aeronomy	28 February	Launch failure
28 February; 12:11	Apogee: 55 kilometres (34 mi)					
28 February; 13:15	(United States) Nike-Apache		(United States) Eglin		(United States) US Air Force	
28 February; 13:15		AFCRL	Suborbital	Ionospheric	28 February	Launch failure
28 February; 13:15	Apogee: 28 kilometres (17 mi)					
February	(United States) Nike-Apache		(United States) White Sands		(United States) US Army	
February		US Army	Suborbital	Target	February	Successful
February	Apogee: 100 kilometres (62 mi)					
February	(United States) Nike-Apache		(United States) White Sands		(United States) US Army	
February		US Army	Suborbital	Target	February	Successful
February	Apogee: 100 kilometres (62 mi)					
February	(United States) Nike-Javelin		(United States) White Sands		(United States) DASA	
February		DASA	Suborbital	Aeronomy	February	Successful
February	Apogee: 100 kilometres (62 mi)					
=== March ===
1 March; 17:18:06	(United States) UGM-27 Polaris A3		(United States) USS John C. Calhoun, ETR		(United States) US Navy	
1 March; 17:18:06		US Navy	Suborbital	Missile test	1 March	Successful
1 March; 17:18:06	Apogee: 1,000 kilometres (620 mi)					
1 March; 20:43	(United States) Nike-Apache		(Norway) Andøya		(United States) (Sweden) NASA/?	
1 March; 20:43		UPP	Suborbital	Aeronomy	1 March	Successful
1 March; 20:43	Apogee: 185 kilometres (115 mi)					
2 March; 01:10	(United States) LGM-30B Minuteman IB		(United States) Vandenberg LF-08		(United States) Strategic Air Command	
2 March; 01:10		Strategic Air Command	Suborbital	Missile test	2 March	Successful
2 March; 01:10	Apogee: 1,300 kilometres (810 mi)					
2 March; 09:52:31	(United States) SM-65D Atlas		(United States) Vandenberg LC-576A-3		(United States) Strategic Air Command	
2 March; 09:52:31		Strategic Air Command	Suborbital	Target	2 March	Successful
2 March; 09:52:31	Apogee: 1,800 kilometres (1,100 mi)					
2 March	(United States) Nike-Tomahawk		(United States) Barking Sands		(United States) Sandia	
2 March		LASL	Suborbital	Technology	2 March	Successful
2 March	Apogee: 270 kilometres (170 mi)					
2 March	(United States) Nike-Tomahawk		(United States) Barking Sands		(United States) Sandia	
2 March		Sandia	Suborbital	Aeronomy	2 March	Successful
2 March	Apogee: 175 kilometres (109 mi)					
3 March; 00:09	(United States) Aerobee-150 (Hi)		(United States) White Sands LC-35		(United States) US Air Force	
3 March; 00:09		US Air Force	Suborbital	Solar	3 March	Successful
3 March; 00:09	Apogee: 241 kilometres (150 mi)					
3 March; 04:42	(United Kingdom) Skylark 3		(Australia) Woomera LA-2		(United Kingdom) (Australia) RAE/WRE	
3 March; 04:42		RAE/WRE	Suborbital	Test flight	3 March	Successful
3 March; 04:42	Apogee: 216 kilometres (134 mi)					
3 March; 14:15:00	(United States) Aerobee-150 (Hi)		(United States) White Sands		(United States) US Air Force	
3 March; 14:15:00		US Air Force	Suborbital	Solar	3 March	
3 March; 14:15:00	Apogee: 252 kilometres (157 mi)					
3 March; 22:28	(United States) Nike-Apache		(Norway) Andøya		(United States) (Norway) NASA/NTNF	
3 March; 22:28		NASA	Suborbital	Aeronomy	3 March	Launch failure
3 March; 22:28	Apogee: 22 kilometres (14 mi)					
4 March; 18:32	(United States) Honest John-Nike-Nike		(United States) Barking Sands		(United States) Sandia	
4 March; 18:32		NASA	Suborbital	Test flight	4 March	Successful
4 March; 18:32	Apogee: 181 kilometres (112 mi)					
4 March	(Soviet Union) R-9 Desna		(Soviet Union) Baikonur		(Soviet Union) RVSN	
4 March		RVSN	Suborbital	Missile test	4 March	Successful
4 March	Apogee: 1,160 kilometres (720 mi)					
4 March	(France) Centaure 1		(Algeria) Hammaguira Bacchus		(France) CNES	
4 March		CNRS	Suborbital	Solar	4 March	Successful
4 March	Apogee: 120 kilometres (75 mi)					
5 March; 00:11	(United States) Aerobee-150 (Hi)		(United States) White Sands LC-35		(United States) US Air Force	
5 March; 00:11		US Air Force	Suborbital	Solar	5 March	Successful
5 March; 00:11	Apogee: 245 kilometres (152 mi)					
5 March; 01:12:59	(United States) UGM-27 Polaris A2E		(United States) Cape Canaveral LC-25A		(United States) US Navy	
5 March; 01:12:59		US Navy	Suborbital	Missile test	5 March	Successful
5 March; 01:12:59	Apogee: 1,000 kilometres (620 mi)					
5 March; 11:00:21	(Soviet Union) R-17 Elbrus		(Soviet Union) Kapustin Yar		(Soviet Union) MVS	
5 March; 11:00:21		MVS	Suborbital	Missile test	5 March	Successful
5 March; 11:00:21	Apogee: 250 kilometres (160 mi)					
5 March; 20:57:50	(United States) Nike-Apache		(Norway) Andøya		(United States) (Sweden) NASA/?	
5 March; 20:57:50		UPP	Suborbital	Aeronomy	5 March	Successful
5 March; 20:57:50	Apogee: 180 kilometres (110 mi)					
5 March	(United States) HGM-25A Titan I		(United States) Vandenberg LC-395A-2		(United States) Strategic Air Command	
5 March		Strategic Air Command	Suborbital	Missile test	5 March	Successful
5 March	Apogee: 1,000 kilometres (620 mi)					
6 March; 03:41	(United States) Aerobee-150 (Hi)		(United States) White Sands LC-35		(United States) NASA	
6 March; 03:41		Princeton	Suborbital	UV Astronomy	6 March	Successful
6 March; 03:41	Apogee: 189 kilometres (117 mi)					
6 March; 07:32	(United States) Aerobee-150 (Hi)		(Canada) Churchill		(United States) US Air Force	
6 March; 07:32		AFCRL/Utah	Suborbital	Aeronomy; Ionospheric	6 March	Successful
6 March; 07:32	Apogee: 193 kilometres (120 mi)					
6 March	(United States) Nike-Tomahawk		(Canada) Churchill		(United States) Sandia	
6 March		LASL	Suborbital	Auroral	6 March	Successful
6 March	Apogee: 184 kilometres (114 mi)					
6 March	(Soviet Union) R-9 Desna		(Soviet Union) Baikonur		(Soviet Union) RVSN	
6 March		RVSN	Suborbital	Missile test	6 March	Successful
6 March	Apogee: 1,160 kilometres (720 mi)					
8 March; 15:35	(United States) Nike-Apache		(United States) USS Croatan, PO-11 LP-2		(United States) NASA	
8 March; 15:35		NASA	Suborbital	Plasma research	8 March	Successful
8 March; 15:35	Apogee: 151 kilometres (94 mi)					
8 March; 17:48:08	(United States) Nike-Apache		(United States) USS Croatan, PO-11 LP-2		(United States) NASA	
8 March; 17:48:08		Michigan	Suborbital	Aeronomy	8 March	Successful
8 March; 17:48:08	Apogee: 141 kilometres (88 mi)					
8 March	(United States) LGM-30B Minuteman IB		(United States) Vandenberg LF-07		(United States) Strategic Air Command	
8 March		Strategic Air Command	Suborbital	Missile test	8 March	Successful
8 March	Apogee: 1,300 kilometres (810 mi)					
9 March; 06:26:26	(United States) Nike-Apache		(United States) USS Croatan, PO-11 LP-3		(United States) NASA	
9 March; 06:26:26		Michigan	Suborbital	Aeronomy	9 March	Successful
9 March; 06:26:26	Apogee: 143 kilometres (89 mi)					
9 March; 16:25	(United States) Nike-Apache		(United States) USS Croatan, PO-11 LP-4		(United States) NASA	
9 March; 16:25		New Hampshire	Suborbital	Plasma research	9 March	Successful
9 March; 16:25	Apogee: 200 kilometres (120 mi)					
10 March; 16:00	(United States) Nike-Apache		(United States) USS Croatan, PO-11 LP-5		(United States) NASA	
10 March; 16:00		New Hampshire	Suborbital	Plasma research	10 March	Successful
10 March; 16:00	Apogee: 200 kilometres (120 mi)					
10 March	(Soviet Union) R-16U		(Soviet Union) Baikonur Site 41/4		(Soviet Union) RVSN	
10 March		RVSN	Suborbital	Missile test	10 March	Successful
10 March	Apogee: 1,210 kilometres (750 mi)					
11 March; 09:35:14	(United States) Nike-Apache		(United States) USS Croatan, PO-11 LP-6		(United States) NASA	
11 March; 09:35:14		Michigan	Suborbital	Aeronomy	11 March	Successful
11 March; 09:35:14	Apogee: 197 kilometres (122 mi)					
11 March; 10:38	(United States) Nike-Cajun		(United States) USS Croatan, PO-11 LP-7		(United States) NASA	
11 March; 10:38		Michigan	Suborbital	Aeronomy	11 March	Successful
11 March; 10:38	Apogee: 100 kilometres (62 mi)					
11 March; 20:07	(United States) Nike-Apache		(United States) USS Croatan, PO-11 LP-8		(United States) NASA	
11 March; 20:07		Michigan	Suborbital	Aeronomy	11 March	Successful
11 March; 20:07	Apogee: 200 kilometres (120 mi)					
12 March; 13:30	(United States) Nike-Apache		(United States) USS Croatan, PO-11 LP-9		(United States) NASA	
12 March; 13:30		New Hampshire	Suborbital	Plasma research	12 March	Successful
12 March; 13:30	Apogee: 178 kilometres (111 mi)					
12 March; 16:00	(United States) Nike-Apache		(United States) USS Croatan, PO-11 LP-9		(United States) NASA	
12 March; 16:00		New Hampshire	Suborbital	Plasma research	12 March	Successful
12 March; 16:00	Apogee: 175 kilometres (109 mi)					
12 March; 23:21:52	(United States) SM-65D Atlas		(United States) Vandenberg LC-576B-3		(United States) Strategic Air Command	
12 March; 23:21:52		Strategic Air Command	Suborbital	REV Test	12 March	Successful
12 March; 23:21:52	Apogee: 1,800 kilometres (1,100 mi)					
12 March	(United States) Nike-Tomahawk		(United States) Barking Sands		(United States) Sandia	
12 March		Sandia	Suborbital	Aeronomy	12 March	Successful
12 March	Apogee: 280 kilometres (170 mi)					
13 March; 03:38	(United States) Aerobee-150 (Hi)		(United States) White Sands LC-35		(United States) NASA	
13 March; 03:38		NASA	Suborbital	UV Astronomy	13 March	Successful
13 March; 03:38	Apogee: 155 kilometres (96 mi)					
13 March; 03:55	(United States) Aerobee-150 (Hi)		(United States) White Sands LC-35		(United States) US Air Force	
13 March; 03:55		US Air Force	Suborbital	Astronomy	13 March	Successful
13 March; 03:55	Apogee: 105 kilometres (65 mi)					
13 March; 07:42	(United States) Aerobee-150 (Hi)		(Canada) Churchill		(United States) US Air Force	
13 March; 07:42		AFCRL/Utah	Suborbital	Meteoroid research Auroral	13 March	Successful
13 March; 07:42	Apogee: 184 kilometres (114 mi)					
13 March; 08:20:31	(Soviet Union) R-17 Elbrus		(Soviet Union) Kapustin Yar		(Soviet Union) MVS	
13 March; 08:20:31		MVS	Suborbital	Missile test	13 March	Successful
13 March; 08:20:31	Apogee: 207 kilometres (129 mi)					
15 March; 18:22:02	(United States) UGM-27 Polaris A3		(United States) USS Nathanael Greene, ETR		(United States) US Navy	
15 March; 18:22:02		US Navy	Suborbital	Missile test	15 March	Successful
15 March; 18:22:02	Apogee: 1,000 kilometres (620 mi)					
15 March; 19:09:01	(United States) UGM-27 Polaris A3		(United States) USS Nathanael Greene, ETR		(United States) US Navy	
15 March; 19:09:01		US Navy	Suborbital	Missile test	15 March	Successful
15 March; 19:09:01	Apogee: 1,000 kilometres (620 mi)					
15 March; 20:41	(United States) Nike-Apache		(Norway) Andøya		(United States) (Norway) NASA/NTNF	
15 March; 20:41		NASA	Suborbital	Ionospheric; Auroral	15 March	Launch failure
15 March; 20:41	Apogee: 35 kilometres (22 mi)					
16 March; 16:15	(United States) Nike-Apache		(United States) USS Croatan, PO-11 LP-10		(United States) NASA	
16 March; 16:15		NASA	Suborbital	Plasma research	16 March	Successful
16 March; 16:15	Apogee: 172 kilometres (107 mi)					
16 March; 16:51	(United States) Nike-Apache		(United States) USS Croatan, PO-11 LP-11		(United States) NASA	
16 March; 16:51		NASA	Suborbital	Ionospheric	16 March	Successful
16 March; 16:51	Apogee: 200 kilometres (120 mi)					
16 March	(United States) LGM-30B Minuteman IB		(United States) Vandenberg LF-02		(United States) Strategic Air Command	
16 March		Strategic Air Command	Suborbital	Missile test	16 March	Successful
16 March	Apogee: 1,300 kilometres (810 mi)					
16 March	(Soviet Union) R-12 Dvina		(Soviet Union) Kapustin Yar		(Soviet Union) MVS	
16 March		MVS	Suborbital	Missile test	16 March	Successful
16 March	Apogee: 402 kilometres (250 mi)					
17 March; 15:10	(United States) Aerobee-150 (Hi)		(United States) White Sands LC-35		(United States) NASA	
17 March; 15:10		ASE	Suborbital	Solar	17 March	Successful
17 March; 15:10	Apogee: 156 kilometres (97 mi)					
17 March; 18:08	(United Kingdom) Skylark-7C		(Australia) Woomera LA-2		(United Kingdom) (Australia) RAE/WRE	
17 March; 18:08		UCL/ROE/Sheffield	Suborbital	UV astronomy	17 March	Launch failure
17 March; 18:08	Apogee: 19 kilometres (12 mi)					
17 March; 21:30	(Canada) Black Brant II		(Canada) Churchill		(Canada) NRC	
17 March; 21:30		U of Toronto	Suborbital	Aeronomy	17 March	Successful
17 March; 21:30	Apogee: 153 kilometres (95 mi)					
18 March; 06:04	(United States) Nike-Apache		(United States) USS Croatan, PO-11 LP-12		(United States) NASA	
18 March; 06:04		NASA	Suborbital	Plasma research	18 March	Successful
18 March; 06:04	Apogee: 150 kilometres (93 mi)					
18 March; 06:41	(United States) Nike-Apache		(United States) USS Croatan, PO-11 LP-13		(United States) NASA	
18 March; 06:41		NASA	Suborbital	Ionospheric	18 March	Successful
18 March; 06:41	Apogee: 200 kilometres (120 mi)					
18 March; 10:07	(Japan) Lambda 3		(Japan) Kagoshima LA-L		(Japan) ISAS	
18 March; 10:07		Nagasaki/Tokyo	Suborbital	XR astronomy	18 March	Successful
18 March; 10:07	Apogee: 1,085 kilometres (674 mi)					
18 March; 16:01	(United States) Nike-Apache		(United States) USS Croatan, PO-11 LP-14		(United States) NASA	
18 March; 16:01		NASA	Suborbital	Plasma research	18 March	Successful
18 March; 16:01	Apogee: 149 kilometres (93 mi)					
18 March; 16:38	(United States) Nike-Apache		(United States) USS Croatan, PO-11 LP-15		(United States) NASA	
18 March; 16:38		NASA	Suborbital	Ionospheric	18 March	Successful
18 March; 16:38	Apogee: 200 kilometres (120 mi)					
18 March; 20:43	(United States) Nike-Apache		(United States) Wallops Island		(United States) NASA	
18 March; 20:43		UT Dallas	Suborbital	Aeronomy	18 March	Successful
18 March; 20:43	Apogee: 158 kilometres (98 mi)					
19 March; 03:00	(United States) Aerobee-150 (Hi)		(United States) White Sands LC-35		(United States) NASA	
19 March; 03:00		NASA	Suborbital	UV Astronomy	19 March	Successful
19 March; 03:00	Apogee: 155 kilometres (96 mi)					
19 March; 06:24	(Canada) Black Brant II		(Canada) Churchill		(Canada) NRC	
19 March; 06:24		SASK	Suborbital	Fields research	19 March	Successful
19 March; 06:24	Apogee: 168 kilometres (104 mi)					
19 March; 18:09	(United States) Nike-Tomahawk		(United States) Wallops Island		(United States) NASA	
19 March; 18:09		NASA	Suborbital	Aeronomy	19 March	Successful
19 March; 18:09	Apogee: 315 kilometres (196 mi)					
20 March; 05:42	(United States) Aerobee-300		(United States) Wallops Island		(United States) NASA	
20 March; 05:42		Michigan	Suborbital	Aeronomy	20 March	Successful
20 March; 05:42	Apogee: 326 kilometres (203 mi)					
20 March; 13:20:09	(United States) Nike-Apache		(United States) USS Croatan, PO-11 LP-16		(United States) NASA	
20 March; 13:20:09		Urbana-Champaign	Suborbital	Ionospheric	20 March	Successful
20 March; 13:20:09	Apogee: 174 kilometres (108 mi)					
20 March; 16:28	(United States) Nike-Apache		(United States) USS Croatan, PO-11 LP-17		(United States) US Air Force	
20 March; 16:28		AFCRL	Suborbital	Ionospheric	20 March	Successful
20 March; 16:28	Apogee: 201 kilometres (125 mi)					
20 March; 17:04:13	(United States) Nike-Cajun		(United States) USS Croatan, PO-11 LP-18		(United States) US Air Force	
20 March; 17:04:13		AFCRL	Suborbital	Ionospheric	20 March	Successful
20 March; 17:04:13	Apogee: 122 kilometres (76 mi)					
21 March; 23:08	(United Kingdom) Blue Streak		(Australia) Woomera LA-6A		(Europe) ELDO	
21 March; 23:08		ELDO	Suborbital		21 March	Successful
21 March; 23:08	Apogee: 263 kilometres (163 mi)					
22 March; 07:44	(United States) Nike-Apache		(United States) USS Croatan, PO-11 LP-19		(United States) US Air Force	
22 March; 07:44		AFCRL	Suborbital	Ionospheric	22 March	Successful
22 March; 07:44	Apogee: 206 kilometres (128 mi)					
22 March; 08:49:10	(United States) Nike-Cajun		(United States) USS Croatan, PO-11 LP-20		(United States) US Air Force	
22 March; 08:49:10		AFCRL	Suborbital	Ionospheric	22 March	Successful
22 March; 08:49:10	Apogee: 120 kilometres (75 mi)					
22 March; 22:19	(United States) Nike-Apache		(Norway) Andøya		(United States) (Norway) NASA/NTNF	
22 March; 22:19		NICP/KGO	Suborbital	Aeronomy	22 March	Launch failure
22 March; 22:19	Apogee: 20 kilometres (12 mi)					
22 March	(Soviet Union) R-14 Chusovaya		(Soviet Union) Kapustin Yar		(Soviet Union) RVSN	
22 March		RVSN	Suborbital	Missile test	22 March	Successful
22 March	Apogee: 675 kilometres (419 mi)					
23 March; 09:31:09	(United States) Nike-Apache		(United States) USS Croatan, PO-11 LP-18		(United States) NASA	
23 March; 09:31:09		Urbana-Champaign	Suborbital	Ionospheric	23 March	Successful
23 March; 09:31:09	Apogee: 165 kilometres (103 mi)					
24 March; 01:24	(Canada) Martlet 2		Barbados		(Canada) (United States) DND/DoD	
24 March; 01:24		DND/DoD	Suborbital	Aeronomy	24 March	Successful
24 March; 01:24	Apogee: 114 kilometres (71 mi)					
24 March; 05:03	(Canada) Martlet 2		Barbados		(Canada) (United States) DND/DoD	
24 March; 05:03		DND/DoD	Suborbital	Aeronomy	24 March	Successful
24 March; 05:03	Apogee: 110 kilometres (68 mi)					
24 March; 06:40	(Canada) Black Brant II		(Canada) Churchill		(Canada) NRC	
24 March; 06:40		NRC	Suborbital	Fields research	24 March	Successful
24 March; 06:40	Apogee: 166 kilometres (103 mi)					
24 March; 16:34	(United States) Nike-Apache		(United States) USS Croatan, PO-11 LP-22		(United States) NASA	
24 March; 16:34		NASA	Suborbital	Plasma research	24 March	Successful
24 March; 16:34	Apogee: 200 kilometres (120 mi)					
24 March; 17:07	(United States) Nike-Apache		(United States) USS Croatan, PO-11 LP-23		(United States) NASA	
24 March; 17:07		NASA	Suborbital	Ionospheric	24 March	Successful
24 March; 17:07	Apogee: 200 kilometres (120 mi)					
25 March; 00:06	(United Kingdom) Skylark-7C		(Australia) Woomera LA-2		(United Kingdom) (Australia) RAE/WRE	
25 March; 00:06		UCL/ROE/Sheffield	Suborbital	UV Astronomy; Ionospheric	25 March	Successful
25 March; 00:06	Apogee: 174 kilometres (108 mi)					
25 March; 02:15:16	(United States) LGM-25C Titan II		(United States) Vandenberg LC-395B		(United States) Strategic Air Command	
25 March; 02:15:16		Strategic Air Command	Suborbital	Missile test	25 March	Successful
25 March; 02:15:16	Apogee: 1,300 kilometres (810 mi)					
25 March; 05:34	(Canada) Black Brant II		(Canada) Churchill		(Canada) NRC	
25 March; 05:34		NRC	Suborbital	Ionospheric; Micrometeoroid research	25 March	Successful
25 March; 05:34	Apogee: 155 kilometres (96 mi)					
25 March; 11:21	(Japan) Kappa-9M		(Japan) Kagoshima		(Japan) ISAS	
25 March; 11:21		TAO	Suborbital	Aeronomy; Ionospheric	25 March	Successful
25 March; 11:21	Apogee: 320 kilometres (200 mi)					
25 March; 16:00	(United States) Nike-Apache		(United States) USS Croatan, PO-11 LP-24		(United States) US Air Force	
25 March; 16:00		AFCRL	Suborbital	Ionospheric	25 March	Successful
25 March; 16:00	Apogee: 100 kilometres (62 mi)					
25 March	(United States) LGM-30B Minuteman IB		(United States) Vandenberg LF-03		(United States) Strategic Air Command	
25 March		Strategic Air Command	Suborbital	Missile test	25 March	Successful
25 March	Apogee: 1,300 kilometres (810 mi)					
26 March; 09:01:11	(United States) SM-65D Atlas		(United States) Vandenberg LC-576A-1		(United States) US Air Force	
26 March; 09:01:11		US Air Force	Suborbital	REV Test	26 March	Successful
26 March; 09:01:11	Apogee: 1,800 kilometres (1,100 mi)					
26 March; 15:41	(United States) Nike-Apache		(United States) USS Croatan, PO-11 LP-25		(United States) NASA	
26 March; 15:41		NASA	Suborbital	Plasma research	26 March	Successful
26 March; 15:41	Apogee: 155 kilometres (96 mi)					
26 March; 16:13	(United States) Nike-Apache		(United States) USS Croatan, PO-11 LP-26		(United States) NASA	
26 March; 16:13		NASA	Suborbital	Ionospheric	26 March	Successful
26 March; 16:13	Apogee: 200 kilometres (120 mi)					
26 March	(Soviet Union) R-12 Dvina		(Soviet Union) Kapustin Yar		(Soviet Union) MVS	
26 March		MVS	Suborbital	Missile test	26 March	Successful
26 March	Apogee: 402 kilometres (250 mi)					
27 March; 03:00	(United States) Nike-Apache		(United States) USS Croatan, PO-11 LP-27		(United States) NASA	
27 March; 03:00		NASA	Suborbital	Ionospheric	27 March	Successful
27 March; 03:00	Apogee: 200 kilometres (120 mi)					
27 March; 05:01	(Japan) Kappa-9M		(Japan) Kagoshima		(Japan) ISAS	
27 March; 05:01		Tokyo	Suborbital	Ionospheric	27 March	Successful
27 March; 05:01	Apogee: 335 kilometres (208 mi)					
27 March; 06:20	(Canada) Martlet 2		Barbados		(Canada) (United States) DND/DoD	
27 March; 06:20		DND/DoD	Suborbital	Aeronomy	27 March	Successful
27 March; 06:20	Apogee: 111 kilometres (69 mi)					
27 March; 18:08	(United States) Nike-Apache		(United States) USS Croatan, PO-11 LP-28		(United States) NASA	
27 March; 18:08		NASA	Suborbital	Plasma research	27 March	Successful
27 March; 18:08	Apogee: 200 kilometres (120 mi)					
28 March; 07:01	(Japan) Kappa-9M		(Japan) Kagoshima		(Japan) ISAS	
28 March; 07:01		Kyoto	Suborbital	Ionospheric; Plasma	28 March	Successful
28 March; 07:01	Apogee: 349 kilometres (217 mi)					
28 March; 15:50	(United States) Nike-Apache		(United States) USS Croatan, PO-11 LP-29		(United States) US Air Force	
28 March; 15:50		AFCRL	Suborbital	Ionospheric	28 March	Successful
28 March; 15:50	Apogee: 129 kilometres (80 mi)					
29 March; 00:02	(Canada) Martlet 2		Barbados		(Canada) (United States) DND/DoD	
29 March; 00:02		DND/DoD	Suborbital	Aeronomy	29 March	Successful
29 March; 00:02	Apogee: 119 kilometres (74 mi)					
29 March; 02:20	(Canada) Martlet 2		Barbados		(Canada) (United States) DND/DoD	
29 March; 02:20		DND/DoD	Suborbital	Aeronomy	29 March	Successful
29 March; 02:20	Apogee: 117 kilometres (73 mi)					
29 March; 15:47	(United States) Nike-Apache		(United States) USS Croatan, PO-11 LP-30		(United States) NASA	
29 March; 15:47		NASA	Suborbital	Plasma research	29 March	Successful
29 March; 15:47	Apogee: 172 kilometres (107 mi)					
29 March; 15:47	(United States) Nike-Cajun		(United States) USS Croatan, PO-11 LP-30		(United States) NASA	
29 March; 15:47		NASA	Suborbital	Plasma research	29 March	Successful
29 March; 15:47	Apogee: 172 kilometres (107 mi)					
29 March; 18:30:07	(United States) UGM-27 Polaris A3		(United States) USS Nathanael Greene, ETR		(United States) US Navy	
29 March; 18:30:07		US Navy	Suborbital	Missile test	29 March	Successful
29 March; 18:30:07	Apogee: 1,000 kilometres (620 mi)					
30 March; 05:50	(United States) Aerobee-150 (Hi)		(United States) White Sands LC-35		(United States) NRL	
30 March; 05:50		NRL	Suborbital	Aeronomy; UV astronomy	30 March	Successful
30 March; 05:50	Apogee: 217 kilometres (135 mi)					
30 March; 09:30	(United States) HAD		(Australia) Woomera LA-2		(Australia) WRE	
30 March; 09:30		WRE	Suborbital	Aeronomy	30 March	Successful
30 March; 09:30	Apogee: 112 kilometres (70 mi)					
30 March; 16:09:31	(United States) XRM-91 Blue Scout Jr		(United States) Cape Canaveral LC-18A		(United States) US Air Force	
30 March; 16:09:31		AFCRL	Suborbital	Magnetospheric	30 March	Successful
30 March; 16:09:31	Apogee: 12,067 kilometres (7,498 mi)					
30 March	(Soviet Union) R-16U		(Soviet Union) Baikonur Site 41/4		(Soviet Union) RVSN	
30 March		RVSN	Suborbital	Missile test	30 March	Successful
30 March	Apogee: 1,210 kilometres (750 mi)					
31 March; 14:34	(United Kingdom) Skylark-7		(Italy) Salto di Quirra		(Europe) ESRO	
31 March; 14:34		UCL	Suborbital	Ionospheric	31 March	Launch failure
31 March; 14:34	Apogee: 45 kilometres (28 mi)					
March	(United States) Nike-Apache		(United States) White Sands		(United States) US Army	
March		US Army	Suborbital	Target	March	Successful
March	Apogee: 100 kilometres (62 mi)					
March	(United States) Nike-Apache		(United States) White Sands		(United States) US Army	
March		US Army	Suborbital	Target	March	Successful
March	Apogee: 100 kilometres (62 mi)					
March	(United States) Nike-Zeus 3		(United States) Kwajalein		(United States) US Army	
March		US Army	Suborbital	ABM test	March	Successful
March	Apogee: 200 kilometres (120 mi)					
March	(United States) Nike-Zeus 3		(United States) Kwajalein		(United States) US Army	
March		US Army	Suborbital	ABM test	March	Successful
March	Apogee: 200 kilometres (120 mi)					

- ← Jan
- Feb
- Mar
- Apr
- May
- Jun
- Jul
- Aug
- Sep
- Oct
- Nov
- Dec →
