= Kosmos 53 =

Soviet technology demonstration satellite

- Mission type: Technology; Radiation
- COSPAR ID: 1965-006A
- SATCAT no.: 00983
- Mission duration: 559 days

Spacecraft properties
- Spacecraft type: DS-A1
- Manufacturer: Yuzhnoye
- Launch mass: 310 kg

Start of mission
- Launch date: 30 January 1965, 09:36:00 GMT
- Rocket: Kosmos-2I 63S1
- Launch site: Kapustin Yar, Site 86/1

End of mission
- Decay date: 12 August 1966

Orbital parameters
- Reference system: Geocentric
- Regime: Low Earth
- Perigee altitude: 218 km
- Apogee altitude: 1180 km
- Inclination: 48.8°
- Period: 98.7 minutes
- Epoch: 30 January 1965

Kosmos 53 (Russian: Космос 53 meaning Cosmos 53), also known as DS-A1 No.5 was a technology demonstration satellite which was launched by the Soviet Union in 1965 as part of the Dnepropetrovsk Sputnik programme. Its primary mission was to demonstrate technologies for future Soviet military satellites. It also conducted radiation experiments.

It was launched aboard a Kosmos-2I 63S1 rocket, from Site 86/1 at Kapustin Yar. The launch occurred at 09:36 GMT on 30 January 1965.

Kosmos 53 was placed into a low Earth orbit with a perigee of 218 kilometres (135 mi), an apogee of 1,180 kilometres (730 mi), 48.8° of inclination, and an orbital period of 98.7 minutes. It decayed on 12 August 1966. Kosmos 53 was the fifth of seven DS-A1 satellites to be launched, and the third to reach orbit after Kosmos 11 and Kosmos 17. The next DS-A1 launch after Kosmos 53 failed (7 February 1965), before the last launch of the DS-A1 programme resulted in Kosmos 70 successfully reaching orbit on 2 July 1965. As with earlier DS-A1 satellites, the technological experiments aboard Kosmos 53 were tests of communications and navigation systems which were later used on the GLONASS system.

== See also ==
- 1965 in spaceflight
