= Kosmos 76 =

Soviet military satellite

- Mission type: ABM radar target
- COSPAR ID: 1965-059A
- SATCAT no.: 01464
- Mission duration: 236 days

Spacecraft properties
- Spacecraft type: DS-P1-Yu
- Manufacturer: Yuzhnoye
- Launch mass: 325 kg

Start of mission
- Launch date: 23 July 1965, 04:33:00 GMT
- Rocket: Kosmos-2I 63S1
- Launch site: Kapustin Yar, Site 86/1
- Contractor: Yuzhnoye

End of mission
- Decay date: 16 March 1966

Orbital parameters
- Reference system: Geocentric
- Regime: Low Earth
- Perigee altitude: 256 km
- Apogee altitude: 513 km
- Inclination: 48.8°
- Period: 92.2 minutes
- Epoch: 23 July 1965

Kosmos 76 (Russian: Космос 76 meaning Cosmos 76), also known as DS-P1-Yu No.3 was a Soviet satellite which was used as a radar calibration target for tests of anti-ballistic missiles. It was built by the Yuzhnoye Design Bureau, and launched in 1965 as part of the Dnepropetrovsk Sputnik programme.

Kosmos 76 was launched using a Kosmos-2I 63S1 carrier rocket, which flew from Site 86/1 at Kapustin Yar. The launch occurred at 04:33 GMT on 23 July 1965.

Kosmos 76 separated from its carrier rocket into a low Earth orbit with a perigee of 256 kilometres (159 mi), an apogee of 513 kilometres (319 mi), an 48.8° of inclination, and an orbital period of 92.2 minutes. It decayed from orbit on 16 March 1966. Kosmos 76 was the third of seventy nine DS-P1-Yu satellites to be launched, of which all but seven were successful. It replaced the previous satellite, DS-P1-Yu No.2, launched on 12 February 1965, which had failed to reach orbit due to a second stage malfunction

== See also ==
- 1965 in spaceflight
