= Kosmos 17 =

Societ technology demonstration satellite

- Mission type: Technology; Radiation
- COSPAR ID: 1963-017A
- SATCAT no.: 00580
- Mission duration: 741 days

Spacecraft properties
- Spacecraft type: DS-A1
- Manufacturer: Yuzhnoye
- Launch mass: 322 kg

Start of mission
- Launch date: 22 May 1963, 03:07:00 GMT
- Rocket: Kosmos-2I 63S1
- Launch site: Kapustin Yar, Mayak-2
- Contractor: Yuzhnoye

End of mission
- Decay date: 2 June 1965

Orbital parameters
- Reference system: Geocentric
- Regime: Low Earth
- Perigee altitude: 260 km
- Apogee altitude: 788 km
- Inclination: 49.0°
- Period: 94.8 minutes
- Epoch: 22 May 1963

Kosmos 17 (Russian: Космос 17 meaning Cosmos 17), also known as DS-A1 No.2 was a technology demonstration satellite which was launched by the Soviet Union in 1963. It was launched as part of the Dnepropetrovsk Sputnik programme. Its primary mission was to demonstrate technologies for future Soviet military satellites. It also conducted radiation experiments.

== Spacecraft ==
The DS-A1 satellites were developed by Yuzhnoye to test the techniques and equipment for communication and navigation systems and performed radiation measurements. It had a mass of 322 kilograms (710 lb).

== Launch ==
Kosmos 17 was launched aboard a Kosmos-2I 63S1 rocket, flying from pad 2 of the Mayak-2 at Kapustin Yar. The launch occurred at 03:07:00 GMT on 22 May 1963.

== Mission ==
Kosmos 17 was placed into a low Earth orbit with a perigee of 260 kilometres (160 mi), an apogee of 788 kilometres (490 mi), 49.0° of inclination, and an orbital period of 94.8 minutes. It decayed on 2 June 1965. Kosmos 17 was the second of seven DS-A1 satellites to be launched. The previous DS-A1 was Kosmos 11. The next two DS-A1 launches failed (22 August 1963 and 24 October 1963), before Kosmos 53 successfully reached orbit on 30 January 1965. The technological experiments aboard Kosmos 17 were tests of communications and navigation systems which were later used on the GLONASS system.

== See also ==
- 1962 in spaceflight
