= Tempsat-1 =

Tempsat 1
- Mission type: Radar Calibration Object
- Operator: United States Navy
- COSPAR ID: 1965-065E
- SATCAT no.: 1512

Start of mission
- Launch date: 13 August 1965
- Rocket: Thor Ablestar
- Launch site: Vandenberg Air Force Base launch site SLC2E

Orbital parameters
- Reference system: Geocentric
- Regime: LEO
- Semi-major axis: 7,512 kilometers (4,668 mi)
- Eccentricity: 0.02618
- Perigee altitude: 1,088.8 kilometers (676.5 mi)
- Apogee altitude: 1,193.4 kilometers (741.5 mi)
- Inclination: 89.9°
- Period: 108 minutes

Tempsat-1 was a United States Navy Radar calibration object, launched from Vandenberg Air Force Base on a Thor Ablestar on August 13, 1965. It was a 14-inch (36 cm), unguided sphere. It was mainly used in investigation of spacecraft technology and orbits.
