= Kosmos 11 =

Societ technology demonstration satellite

- Mission type: Technology
- Harvard designation: 1962 Beta Theta 1
- COSPAR ID: 1962-056A
- SATCAT no.: 00441
- Mission duration: 576 days

Spacecraft properties
- Spacecraft type: DS-A1
- Manufacturer: Yuzhnoye
- Launch mass: 315 kg
- Power: Batteries

Start of mission
- Launch date: 20 October 1962; 03:50:00 GMT
- Rocket: Kosmos-2I 63S1
- Launch site: Kapustin Yar, Mayak-2
- Contractor: Yuzhnoye

End of mission
- Decay date: 18 May 1964

Orbital parameters
- Reference system: Geocentric
- Regime: Low Earth
- Perigee altitude: 234 km
- Apogee altitude: 901 km
- Inclination: 49.0°
- Period: 96.1 minutes
- Epoch: 20 October 1962

Kosmos 11 (Russian: Космос 11 meaning Cosmos 11), also known as DS-A1 No.1 was a technology demonstration satellite which was launched by the Soviet Union in 1962. It was the eleventh satellite to be designated under the Kosmos system, and the fourth spacecraft launched as part of the DS programme to successfully reach orbit, after Kosmos 1, Kosmos 6 and Kosmos 8. Its primary mission was to demonstrate technologies for future Soviet military satellites.

== Spacecraft ==
The DS-A1 satellites were developed by Yuzhnoye to test the techniques and equipment for communication and navigation systems and performed radiation measurements. It had a mass of 315 kilograms (694 lb).

== Launch ==
It was launched aboard the ninth flight of the Kosmos-2I 63S1 rocket. The launch was conducted from Mayak-2 at Kapustin Yar on 20 October 1962 at 03:50:00 GMT.

== Mission ==
Kosmos 11 was placed into a low Earth orbit with a perigee of 234 kilometres (145 mi), an apogee of 901 kilometres (560 mi), an inclination of 49.0°, and an orbital period of 96.1 minutes. It decayed on 18 May 1964. Kosmos 11 was the first of seven DS-A1 satellites to be launched. The next DS-A1 launched will be Kosmos 17, on 22 May 1963.
