= Leonid Gubanov (poet) =

Soviet poet (1946-1983)

- Born: Leonid Georgyevich Gubanov; 20 July 1946; Moscow, Soviet Union
- Died: 8 September 1983 (aged 37); Moscow, Soviet Union
- Occupation: poet
- Spouse: Alyona Basilova

Leonid Georgyevich Gubanov (Russian: Леони́д Гео́ргиевич Губа́нов; 20 July 1946 – 8 September 1983) was a Soviet poet, creator of the unofficial literary circle SMOG.

== Biography ==
He began writing poetry in childhood. In 1962 he entered the literary studio at the district library. Several of his poems were published in the newspaper Pionerskaya Pravda. Then he became interested in futurism and created a neo-futuristic samizdat magazine.

Then he entered the literary studio of the Moscow Palace of Pioneers. Famous poets paid attention to him. In 1964, Yevgeny Yevtushenko helped to print an excerpt from a poem by Leonid Gubanov in the magazine Yunost. This publication was the last publication of Leonid Gubanov in the Soviet press.

In early 1965, together with Vladimir Aleinikov, Vladimir Batshev, Yuri Kublanovsky and others, he participated in the creation of the independent literary and artistic association SMOG.

On 5 December 1965, he took part in a glasnost meeting on Pushkin Square in Moscow. After some time, he was forcibly incarcerated in a special Soviet "psychiatric hospital".

During the era of stagnation, Leonid Gubanov did not take part in official literary life. He earned his living by unskilled labor (he was a working geophysical expedition, photo lab assistant, fireman, graphic designer, janitor, loader).

He died on 8 September 1983 at the age of thirty-seven, and was buried in Moscow at the Khovanskoye Cemetery.

In 1994, the first compilation of Leonid Gubanov, The Angel in the Snow, was published by the publishing house IMA-PRESS.

== Personal life ==
He was married to the poet Alyona Basilova (1943–2018).

== Books ==
- The Angel in the Snow (1994)
- I am Exiled to the Muse on Galleys... (2001)
- Gray Horse (2006)
- And Invited Words to Feast... (2012)
