= Anastasia Dubinina =

Russian author

- Анастасия Дубинина
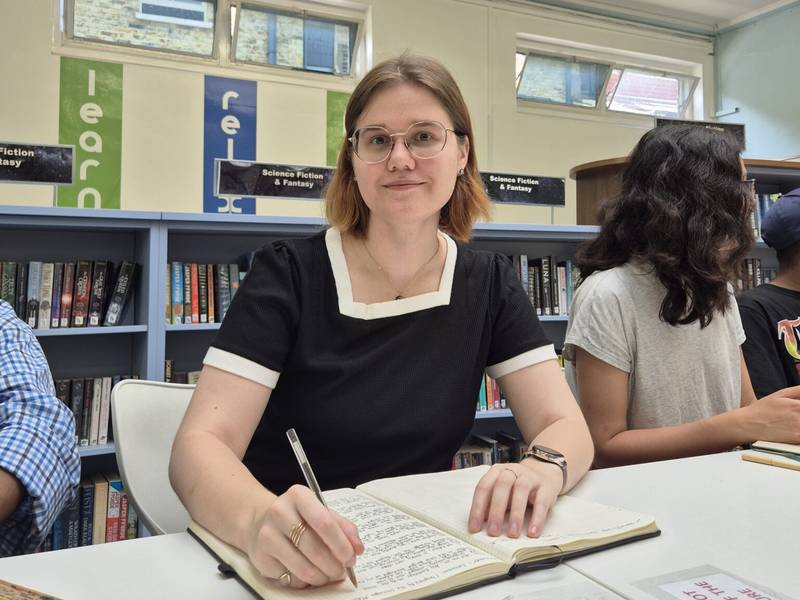
- Born: Saint Petersburg, Russia
- Occupation: Writer
- Writing career
- Language: Russian, English
- Genres: Speculative fiction, Psychological thriller, experimental fiction
- Notable works: Anonymous Letters, Shattered Horizons of Tarveran
- Notable awards: Creativitys UK Award (2025), Stein Arts Award (2024), Cultural Russia Award (2024)
- Website: writeranastasiadubinina.com

Anastasia Dubinina is a Russian-British bilingual fiction writer based in London. She is the author of several works in English and Russian, including the novels Shattered Horizons of Tarveran and Anonymous Letters. Her writing combines elements of speculative fiction, psychological drama, and folklore motifs.

== Career ==
Dubinina's novel Shattered Horizons of Tarveran was published in 2023 by Kotlyarov Publishers. The book explores a fictional world undergoing political and metaphysical collapse, and was presented at the Library for Foreign Literature in Moscow in October 2023.

In 2025, her novel Anonymous Letters was released in the UK. The book has been described by reviewers as a psychological thriller with gothic elements, set in a fictional English village. Literary critics Maria Bregman and Natalya Ivanova noted its emphasis on atmosphere and character development.

== Literary Events ==
In May 2025, Dubinina led a public workshop titled "Building Worlds Beyond the Known" at the Royal Festival Hall in London. The session focused on techniques of narrative world-building and included interactive exercises with participants.

== Awards ==
Dubinina has received several awards for her literary work:

- Creativitys UK Award (2025), presented by Creativitys.UK for Anonymous Letters
- Stein Arts Award (2024), for contributions to innovative fiction
- Cultural Russia Award (2024), in the category of bilingual literature

== Selected works ==
- Shattered Horizons of Tarveran (2023, Kotlyarov Publishers)
- Anonymous Letters (2025, Amazon Press UK)
- Inhuman Humanity (2024)
- Life on the Island (2022)
- Foggy Glimmers (2022)
