= Kosmos 97 =

Soviet satellite

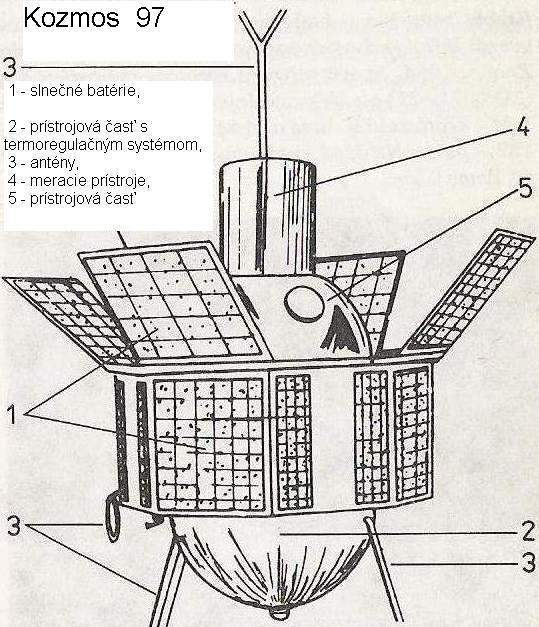
- Mission type: Technology
- COSPAR ID: 1965-095A
- SATCAT no.: 01777
- Mission duration: 127 days

Spacecraft properties
- Spacecraft type: DS-U2-M
- Manufacturer: Yuzhnoye
- Launch mass: 267 kg

Start of mission
- Launch date: 26 November 1965; 12:14:00 GMT
- Rocket: Kosmos-2M 63S1M
- Launch site: Kapustin Yar, Site 86/1
- Contractor: Yuzhnoye

End of mission
- Decay date: 2 April 1967

Orbital parameters
- Reference system: Geocentric
- Regime: Low Earth
- Perigee altitude: 213 km
- Apogee altitude: 2144 km
- Inclination: 49.0°
- Period: 108.3 minutes
- Epoch: 26 November 1965

Kosmos 97 (Russian: Космос 97 meaning Cosmos 97), also known as DS-U2-M No.1, was a Soviet satellite which was launched in 1965 as part of the Dnepropetrovsk Sputnik programme. It was a 267 kilograms (589 lb) spacecraft, which was built by the Yuzhnoye Design Bureau, and used to conduct tests involving atomic clocks.

A Kosmos-2M 63S1M carrier rocket was used to launch Kosmos 97 into low Earth orbit. The launch took place from Site 86/1 at Kapustin Yar. The launch occurred at 12:14 GMT on 26 November 1965, and resulted in the successful insertion of the satellite into orbit. Upon reaching orbit, the satellite was assigned its Kosmos designation, and received the International Designator 1965-095A. The North American Aerospace Defense Command assigned it the catalogue number 01777.

Kosmos 97 contained the first experiments with measuring masers. A molecular quantum generator was tested, which makes it possible to communicate with and control other spacecraft, and to send information great distances. Aspects of the Theory of Relativity were also tested.

Kosmos 97 was the first of two DS-U2-M satellites to be launched, the other being Kosmos 145. It was operated in an orbit with a perigee of 213 kilometres (132 mi), an apogee of 2,144 kilometres (1,332 mi), an inclination of 49.0°, and an orbital period of 108.3 minutes. On 2 April 1967, it decayed from orbit and reentered the atmosphere.

== See also ==
- 1965 in spaceflight
