= Sochi International Film Festival =

Sochi International Film Festival may refer to:

- Kinotavr, established in 1991
- SIFFA, established in 1996
