= Lydia Grigorieva =

Ukrainian photographer and poet

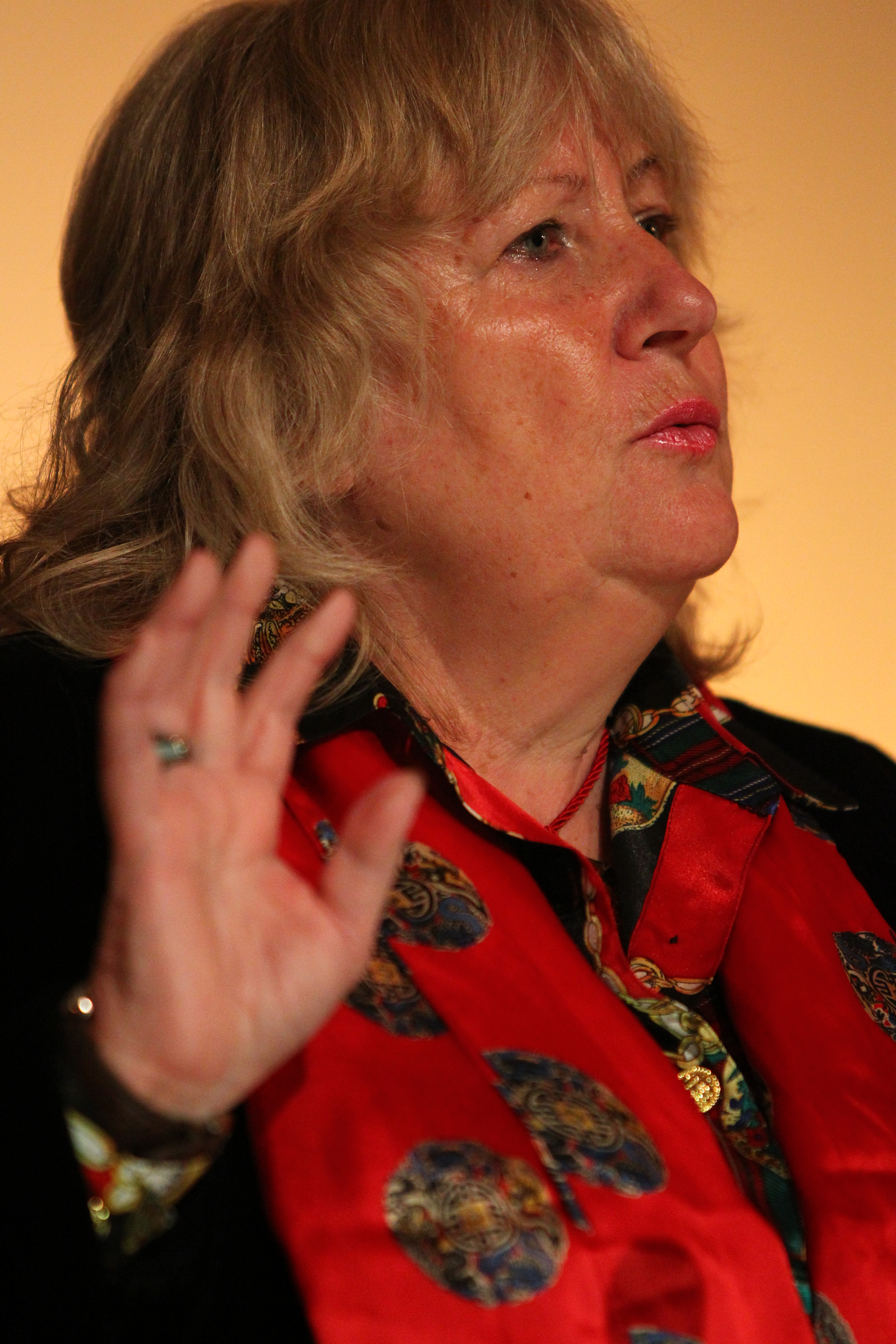
Grigorieva at the British Library in 2011

Lydia Grigorieva (Ukrainian: Лідія Григор'єва, born 1945) is a Ukrainian photographer and poet who now lives in London. Her work has been widely translated and she has worked with the BBC World Service, Russian radio and television and the British Library.

Also described as a "photo-artist", Grigorieva uses a synthesis of poetry and photography in her work. The premiere of her Photo-Poetry took place at the State Pushkin Museum in Moscow.

In 2011, she took part in a seminar at the London Book Fair titled At the Crossroads of Culture: Russian Writers Living in London.

Grigorieva read her work for the British Library's Dual Cultures, Between Two Worlds: Poetry and Translation project which explores the work of poets living in the UK whose first language is not English.

Films written by Grigorieva include:

- Tsvetaeva in London
- Gumilev in London
- Skriabin in London

== Documentary and film work ==
In 2025, Grigorieva was the subject of a documentary film titled Lydia Grigorieva. I Choose to Live (Russian: Лидия Григорьева. Я выбираю жить), directed by Maria Bregman. The film, which explores Grigorieva's life, her connection to poets such as Joseph Brodsky, resilience, and poetry, was presented at the "Salon de la littérature russe in Paris" book salon in Paris.

The film, which explores Grigorieva's life, resilience, and poetry, was an official selection for the competition program of the SIFFA film festival. On 21 November 2025, the film was screened at the Piccadilly Vue Cinema in London, followed by a Q&A session with the director.. Film won the Best Newcomer award at the 2025 SIFFA UK Film Festival.

At the same festival, Grigorieva's own short film, Messengers of Light (directed by Grigorieva), received a Special President Diploma for Outstanding Music (awarded to composer Aleksander Aleksandrov).
