= Fazil Iskander International Literary Award =

International literary prize

Fazil Iskander International Literary Award (Iskander prize)
- Awarded for: Best prose, poetry, screenplays and dramaturgy, children's and teenage prose, translated prose
- Sponsored by: Russian PEN Center
- Venue: Bogolyubov Art Library
- Reward: 100.000 RUB
- First award: 2016; 10 years ago
- Last owner: Svetlana Vasilenko, Prose (2021)
- Website: penrus.ru/category/premiya-fazil-iskander/

Fazil Iskander International Literary Award (Iskander Prize) (Russian: Международная литературная премия имени Фазиля Искандера) is a literary award for 5 nominations, best prose, poetry, screenplays and dramaturgy, children's and teenage prose, translated prose. The award is financed by the Fund of Cultural Initiatives (2022) Eligible candidates for the award are works of all prose genres, including memoirs, biographies and other documentary prose, written in or translated and screenplays and dramaturgy.

The Fazil Iskander International Literary Award (Iskander Prize) was established on August 3, 2016 by the Russian branch of the International "Russian PEN Center".

The aim of the prize is to "perpetuate the memory of the outstanding Russian writer Fazil Iskander with Abkhazian roots", Vice-President of the Russian PEN Center, who "revived the epic structure of literature in the 20th century and innovatively saturated the epic with acutely modern and, at the same time, deeply philosophical content".

== Board of trustees ==
The board of trustees is the highest organ of the award. It approves and amends the regulations of the award, among other tasks. The board of trustees is composed by:

- Yuri Kublanovsky - poet, publicist (chairman of the board)
- Beslan Agrba – Chairman of the Board of the ROO Moscow Abkhaz Diaspora
- Alexander Gorodnitsky – poet, bard, honoured art worker of the Russian Federation, academician of Russian Academy of Natural Sciences
- Vadim Abdrashitov – film director, People's Artist of the Russian Federation
- Ruslan Jopua – scientist, entrepreneur
- Antonina Khlebnikova – poet
- Boris Messerer – People's Artist of the Russian Federation

== Council and jury chairmen ==
The chairman of the jury, in agreement with the chairman of the organizing committee, selects the number of jury members required for his work (from three to six) from among the members of the Russian PEN Center of famous writers with at least 15 years of experience in literary activity, and distributes among them the work with the works coming to the competition. The Jury membership may be renewed if necessary: as a rule, every three years at the suggestion of the Jury Chairman and in agreement with the Chairman of the Organizing Committee. In case of equality of votes and disputes concerning prize issues - the Chairman of the Jury is given the casting vote. The Chairman of the Jury is approved by the writer Yevgeni Anatolyevich Popov. The award jury consists of five famous people—professional writers, cultural and art workers, academics.

Jury members:

- German Vlasov
- Evgeniya Dekina
- Boris Evseev
- Lola Zvonareva
- Marina Kudimova

== Organizing committee ==
The chairman of the prize's organizing committee is approved by the executive committee of Russian PEN Center for a period of three years, by a majority decision of the executive committee, with a subsequent extension for another three years, if no new chairman of the organizing committee has been proposed. The chairman of the organizing committee appoints their deputy. The chairman of the organizing committee proposes a candidate for the chairman of the jury from among the highly authoritative writers, members of Russian PEN Center. The executive committee of Russian PEN Center approves the candidate for the chairman of the prize jury for a period of three years with a subsequent extension of his powers, if no new chairman of the jury is proposed.

The prize organizing committee in agreement with the chairman of the jury approves the Statute of the Fazil Iskander International Prize. The prize organizing committee consists of the following:

- Boris Evseev Writer, the Chairman of the Organizing Committee
- Ludmila Kartuzova - Deputy Chairman
- Sergey Karevsky - System Administrator

== Winners and candidates ==
The award was first announced in 2016.

=== 2022 ===
The "long list" of 71 works was announced on June 11, 2022. list of Candidates to Prose fiction «Plot of Existence». - Vladimir Aleynikov. «Stan». Anastasiya Astafieva . «Stoletnik with Honey. Three Stories about Childhood». Boris Alexiev. «The Pack, or the Tale of the Wise Elder Savvatiy». Anatoly Bimaev «Seven-Eight». Sergey Boyko. «Above Fiction. A true story about the end of the world». Maria Bregman. «Baba Tonya.» A short story. Brilenkov Alexander. «Lyolka.» Short story. Vladimir Vasilyev (writer). «Princess Dolgorukova». Natalia Viko. «Game for fellow hunters». Natalia Volney. «A Suit for Zhenka». A Novel. and other.

=== 2021 ===
Winners of the "Plot of Existence. Prose Svetlana Vasilenko in the favorite. The prize was awarded for the cycle of stories "Kapustin Yar". Sergey Kuznechikhin. "Where Our Time Has Not Gone. Stories from the Life of Alexei Lukich Petukhov". . Earlier, the Iskander Prize Shortlist 2021 was announced. Before that, a long list of 2021 was announced.

=== 2020 ===
In the nomination "Prose" the winner was Valery Popov (writer) with the story "We are not slaves".

=== 2019 ===
In the nomination "Prose" became the laureates and by decision of the jury received two first prizes of equal value—Anatoly Kurchatkin for the novel Minus 273 degrees Celsius and Vladimir Delba for the book Stardust of My Memories.

=== 2018 ===
Chechen writer Kanta Ibragimov won the Prose nomination with his novel Stigal. "The novel 'Stigal' corresponds to the spirit of Fazil Iskander more than other works submitted. Beginning as a diary of a cancer patient, the novel becomes an epic work by the end," said Evgeny Popov, chairman of the jury and president of the Russian PEN Center.

=== 2017 ===
the Fazil Iskander Prize winners were: in the Prose category - Eduard Rusakov (Krasnoyarsk) for book The May Dream of Happiness.
