= Nikolai Berezovsky =

Soviet and Russian writer (1951–2026)

- Born: 24 June 1951
- Died: 14 November 2026 (aged 75)
- Occupations: Writer, poet, journalist

Nikolai Vasilyevich Berezovsky (Russian: Николай Васильевич Березовский; 24 June 1951 – 14 November 2026) was a Soviet and Russian writer, poet and journalist. He was a member of the Union of Russian Writers and the Union of Journalists of Russia. Based in Omsk, he wrote prose, poetry and journalism, and was the author of eight books. His works appeared in Russian literary magazines and newspapers, as well as publications in Hungary and Austria. Several of his children's stories were translated into foreign languages, including Japanese.

== Biography ==
=== Early life and education ===
Nikolai Berezovsky was born on 24 June 1951 on Sakhalin Island, in the Russian SFSR, Soviet Union. He was the grandson of Fyodor A. Berezovsky, a writer associated with Siberian literature. Following his father's death, he was raised in a boarding school.

He completed his secondary education externally and subsequently studied at the Maxim Gorky Literature Institute in Moscow, specialising in prose. He graduated in 1980.

=== Career ===
Before establishing himself as a writer and journalist, Berezovsky worked in several occupations. From 1965 to 1966, he worked as a loader at an Omsk trading depot, followed by employment as a drilling worker in geological exploration from 1966 to 1970.

In 1971, he began working as a correspondent for Omsk television, where he remained until 1990. Alongside his journalistic work, he continued writing prose and poetry. His first stories and poems were published in 1969.

Berezovsky's literary works appeared in a number of Soviet and Russian publications, including Yunost, Oktyabr, Sever, Ural Pathfinder and Literaturnaya Gazeta. His writing was also published in foreign literary periodicals, including publications in Hungary and Austria.

=== Literary works ===
Berezovsky published eight books of prose, poetry and journalism. His works included:

- Ozhidaniye (Ожидание; 1983)
- Ekho (Эхо; 1988)
- Raznaya lyubov (Разная любовь; 1991)
- Kogda ne khodyat po trave (Когда не ходят по траве; 1993)
- Podarok na pamyat (Подарок на память; 2001)
- Mogila dlya gorbatogo (Могила для горбатого; 2002)
- Dozhd v yanvare (Дождь в январе; 2004)
- Skitalets s berezovoy dudkoy ustaloy (Скиталец с березовой дудкой усталой; 2004).

His literary work encompassed fiction, poetry, journalism and writing for children. His children's stories were translated into Japanese and several European languages. His works were also published in Australia, Hungary and Germany.

One of his stories, Tri limona dlya lyubimoy (Три лимона для любимой; Three Lemons for the Beloved), was adapted for the screen in a production involving the Mosfilm and Lentelefilm studios.

Berezovsky received awards and recognition in Russian and international literary competitions. In 2005, he received certificates of recognition from the Royal Danish Embassy, the NSA2005 Foundation and the magazine Na boyevom postu.

=== Memberships ===
Berezovsky became a member of the Union of Writers in 1990. He was also a member of the Union of Journalists of Russia.

== Death ==
Nikolai Berezovsky died in Omsk during the night of 14 November 2026, following a prolonged illness. He was 75 years old. His death was reported by regional media on 16 November 2026.
