= Kosmos 145 =

Soviet satellite

- Mission type: Technology
- COSPAR ID: 1967-019A
- SATCAT no.: 02697
- Mission duration: 371 days

Spacecraft properties
- Spacecraft type: DS-U2-M
- Manufacturer: Yuzhnoye
- Launch mass: 250 kg

Start of mission
- Launch date: 3 March 1967, 06:44:58 GMT
- Rocket: Kosmos-2I 63SM
- Launch site: Kapustin Yar, Site 86/1
- Contractor: Yuzhnoye

End of mission
- Decay date: 8 March 1968

Orbital parameters
- Reference system: Geocentric
- Regime: Low Earth
- Perigee altitude: 215 km
- Apogee altitude: 2116 km
- Inclination: 48.4°
- Period: 108.6 minutes
- Epoch: 3 March 1967

Kosmos 145 (Russian: Космос 145 meaning Cosmos 145), also known as DS-U2-M No.2, was a Soviet satellite which was launched in 1967 as part of the Dnepropetrovsk Sputnik programme. It was a 250 kilograms (550 lb) spacecraft, which was built by the Yuzhnoye Design Bureau, and was used to conduct tests involving atomic clocks.

A Kosmos-2I 63SM carrier rocket was used to launch Kosmos 145 into low Earth orbit. The launch took place from Site 86/1 at Kapustin Yar. The launch occurred at 06:44:58 GMT on 3 March 1967, and resulted in the successful insertion of the satellite into orbit. Upon reaching orbit, the satellite was assigned its Kosmos designation, and received the International Designator 1967-019A. The North American Air Defense Command assigned it the catalogue number 02697.

Kosmos 145 was the second of two DS-U2-M satellites to be launched, after Kosmos 97. It was operated in an orbit with a perigee of 215 kilometres (134 mi), an apogee of 2,116 kilometres (1,315 mi), an inclination of 48.4°, and an orbital period of 108.6 minutes. On 8 March 1968, it decayed from orbit and reentered the atmosphere.

== See also ==
- 1967 in spaceflight
