= Maria Bregman =

Russian-British art critic, literary critic, and writer (born 1976)

- Мария Геннадьевна Брегман
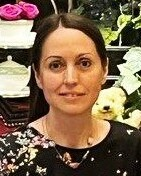
- Born: Maria Gennadievna Bregman; March 20, 1976 (age 50); Moscow, Russian SFSR, Soviet Union
- Citizenship: Russia
- Education: Maxim Gorky Literature Institute; RANEPA
- Occupations: Art critic; Literary critic; Writer; Filmmaker; Cultural producer
- Notable work: Merging with Light (2018 book of stories)
Maria Bregman
- Writing career
- Notable awards: Laureate of the New Amazons International Literary Competition (2022); Longlisted for the Fazil Iskander International Literary Award (2022)
- Website: mariabregman.com

Maria Bregman (Russian: Мария Геннадьевна Брегман; born 20 March 1976) is a Russian-British art and literary critic, writer, and cultural producer. She is known for her critical essays in international publications such as Elle, Esquire, and Cosmopolitan, as well as her work as a literary author and founder of the arts publication Creativitys.UK.

Bregman is a member of the Union of Russian Writers, the PEN Center and the International Federation of Journalists. She has participated in international cultural events, including the Salon de la littérature russe in Paris and the New Delhi World Book Fair.

== Early life and education ==
Maria Bregman was born in 1976 in Moscow, then part of the Soviet Union. She graduated from the Maxim Gorky Literature Institute and its Advanced Literary Courses, where she studied prose. She lives and works in London, United Kingdom.

== Career ==
=== Art and literary criticism ===
Bregman has established a career as a critic and cultural commentator, contributing to a range of independent and mainstream publications. Her art and literary reviews have been published in specialized art magazines like Our Culture Mag and ArtCulture.UK, as well as Russian-language outlets such as the Year of Literature portal and Afisha London.

Her work also appears in international lifestyle magazines, including the Romanian editions of Elle and Esquire, the Bulgarian editions of Cosmopolitan and Glamour, and Elle China. In 2022, she founded the online arts magazine Creativitys.UK and serves as its editor-in-chief. Bregman has also served on the jury for cultural awards, such as the SIFFA and Creativitys UK Awards.

=== Literary career and cultural projects ===
As a writer of fiction and poetry, Bregman has published several books, including Merging with Light (2018) and a poetic adaptation of The Nutcracker (2016). Her works have been presented at events such as the Red Square Book Festival in Moscow.

She is an active participant in the international literary scene. She has been a recurring speaker at the Salon de la littérature russe in Paris (2022–2024), has given readings in London, and presented at the Indo-Russian conference at the 2025 New Delhi World Book Fair.

In 2022, Bregman served as a literary consultant for the AI startup AI Disraeli, a project that explores the use of artificial intelligence in creative writing. Her involvement was presented at the Viva Technology conference in Paris.

=== Filmmaking ===
In 2025, Bregman made her debut as a documentary filmmaker. She directed the film Lydia Grigorieva. I Choose to Live (Лидия Григорьева. Я выбираю жить), a 49-minute documentary about the poet Lydia Grigorieva.

The film had its UK theatrical screening at the Piccadilly Vue Cinema in London on 21 November 2025. It was selected for the competition program of the SIFFA UK Film Festival, where it won the Best Newcomer award in the Documentary category.. The film was presented at the "Salon de la littérature russe in Paris" book salon in Paris. In May 2026, the film received the Award for Excellence in Filmmaking at the joint awards ceremony of the 10th Romford Film Festival and the 9th ECG Eurasian Film Festival in London. On 3 June 2026, the film was screened at the A. F. Losev House-Museum in Moscow; Bregman participated online, together with screenwriter Yulia Tulegenova and the film's subject, Lydia Grigorieva.

=== Early work ===
Early in her career, Bregman she worked at the UNESCO Assistance Fund under the direction of Zurab Tsereteli.. Later, she worked at the State Academic Classical Ballet Theatre under the direction of Natalia Kasatkina and Vladimir Vasiliev. She also worked at the Russian television channel Kultura under the direction of Andrey Raykin; during this time, she created a documentary for the series Universities of the World (Университеты мира) focused on the Sorbonne University.

== Critical reception ==
Bregman's prose has been noted by critics for its clarity and evocative style. Poet, essayist and literary critic Dmitry Bobyshev praised her collection of stories published in the Moskva literary journal, stating: "I haven't read anything like this in a long time: guileless village stories with simple plots, written in a simple, clear style, childlike, fresh, pure, and bright. They are easy to read, and they leave you with a light heart."

Writing for Literaturnaya Gazeta, critic Vera Linkova described Bregman's story "Chelnovaya" as a "tender and subtle story... which combines the beauty of village nature, family comfort, and the joy of falling in love."

Reviewing her work for an English-speaking audience, Evan Harvey wrote: "Maria Bregman writes beautifully and poetically, and her depiction of the harsh Russian winter and the Russian forest is at once stunning and accurate."

== Awards and recognition ==
- Diploma, Anna Akhmatova Competition "I Taught Women to Speak...", 2015
- Diploma, International Tyutchev Literary Competition "Thinking Reed", 2017
- Diploma, All-Russian competition "Front Line", dedicated to the anniversary of World War II, 2020
- Laureate, New Amazons International Literary Competition, 2022
- Longlisted, Fazil Iskander International Literary Award (prose category), 2022
- Longlisted, Fazil Iskander International Literary Award (prose category), 2025, for the short story collection Chelnovaya
- Best Newcomer (Documentary), SIFFA UK Film Festival, 2025
- Award for Excellence in Filmmaking for Lydia Grigorieva. I Choose to Live, joint 10th Romford Film Festival and 9th ECG Eurasian Film Festival, 2026
- Winner, Best Biographical Film (Documentary Film category), Winged Leopard International Film Festival, Kazan, 2026, for Lydia Grigorieva: I Choose to Live

== Selected bibliography ==
=== Books ===
- Nutcracker (Щелкунчик). Moscow: Union of Russian Writers, 2016.
- Merging with Light (Слияние со светом), co-authored with George Bregman. St. Petersburg: FormaT, 2018. ISBN 978-5-98147-175-9
- Nutcracker (English edition). Amazon Publishing, 2024. ISBN 979-8-87224-823-1

=== Publications in anthologies and journals ===
- "The Eye of God" (Глаз Божий). Ice and Flame (Лед и пламень), No. 3, 2015.
- "The River Flows..." (Река течет...). Moskva (Москва), November 2022.
- Works published in collections including I Taught Women to Speak... (Я научила женщин говорить..., 2016), Daughters-Mothers (Дочки-матери, 2020), and Front Line (Линия фронта, 2020).
- Stories published in literary journals Irtysh-Om (Иртышъ-Омь, 2018–2020) and Tara Gates (Тарские ворота, 2020).
