= Levon Osepyan =

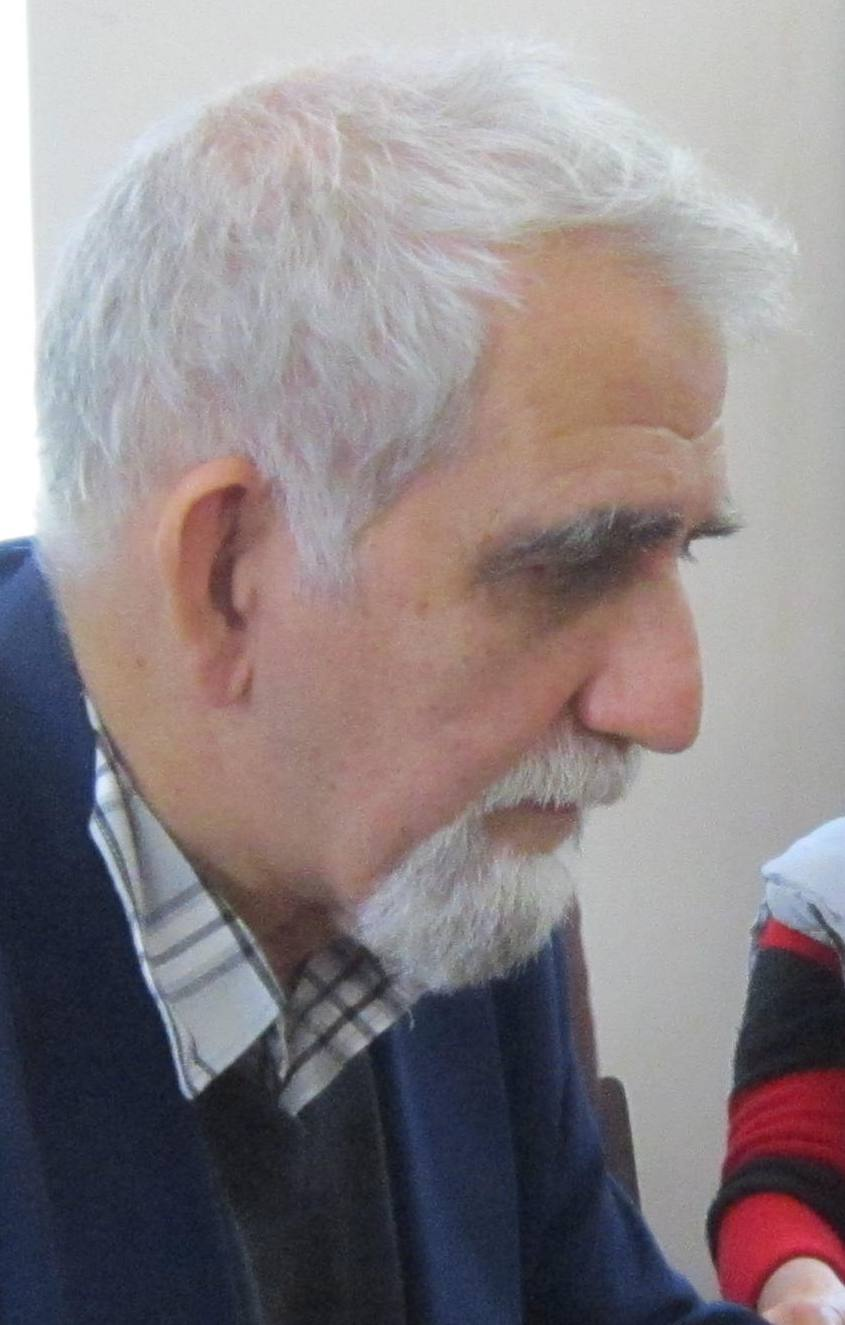
Levon Osepyan

Levon Osepyan (Armenian: Լևոն Օսեպյան; July 25, 1952, Yerevan – July 1, 2024) was a Russian and Armenian writer, publisher, and photographer. He was the editor-in-chief of the almanacs "Mecenat and the World" and "Aragast." He was also a member of the board of the Union of Russian Writers (since December 11, 2012, also the Union's Organizing Secretary), a member of the International Association of Writers and Publicists (IAWP), and a photographer (member of the Creative Union of Professional Artists). He was also co-chairman of the Moscow Society for Friendship with Armenia, a member of the boards of the International Association for the Promotion of Culture, the Society for Friendship with Slovakia, and co-chairman of the Dialogue of Cultures Club.

== Biography ==
Born July 25, 1952, in Yerevan. In 1974 he graduated from the Energy Department of the Azerbaijan Institute of Oil and Chemistry named after M. Azizbekov. He worked in Ryazan, the Tyumen region, and Moscow.

He is the author of the books "Visit to Earth," "Plays," "The Scream," "Phone Call," "My Golgotha," and others. His works have been translated into Armenian, Polish, Slovak, Czech, Tajik, Romanian, German, Italian, French, and English. Levon Osepyan played a major role in the development and maintenance of Armenian-Russian cultural ties.

He was also an art photographer. Levon Osepyan's photographs are in private collections in the United States, Canada, France, Italy, Spain, Israel, the United Kingdom, Australia, Iran, Lebanon, Austria, Poland, the Czech Republic, Slovakia, Armenia, Russia, the Netherlands, and Germany, and have been used in design of books and periodicals. He has held more than 100 solo exhibitions in Armenia, Russia, Poland, China, Israel, and other countries. In 2022, the album "The Armenian World in Photographic Portraits of Levon Osepyan" was published in Moscow.

He died on July 1, 2024, at the age of 71.
