= SMOG (literary group) =

Soviet informal literary group

SMOG (Russian: СМОГ) was one of the earliest informal literary groups independent of the Soviet state in the post-Stalin Soviet Union. Among several interpretations of the acronym are Smelost', Mysl', Obraz i Glubina (Courage, Thought, Image and Depth), and, humorously, Samoe Molodoe Obshchestvo Geniev (Society of Youngest Geniuses). It is also a pun: the Russian word "смог" means "<he> was able (to do something)".

It was organized in January/February 1965 by a group of young poets and writers: Poet Leonid Gubanov (initiator, membership card #1); writer and editor Vladimir Batshev (membership card #2); poet and publicist Yuri Kublanovsky; Vladimir Aleynikov, a poet who received the Andrei Bely Prize; and poets Nikolai Bokov and Arkady Pakhomov, later joined by several dozens of others.

The group held public poetry readings and issued several samizdat collections and a magazine, Sfinksy ("Sphynxes"). In 1965, they revived their literary meetings at Mayakovsky Square (Mayakovsky Square poetry readings).

Some members also helped organize the unsanctioned 1965 glasnost rally calling for a legal trial of writers Andrei Sinyavsky and Yuli Daniel.

The group was under pressure from the state. Its last poetry reading took place on April 14, 1966.

== Bibliography ==
- Aleinikov, Vladimir (2004). Golos i svet, ili SMOG – samoe molodoe obshchestvo geniev. XX vek: liki, litsa, lichiny (in Russian). Moscow: Zvonnitsa-MG. ISBN 5-88093-133-1.
- Aleinikov, Vladimir (2008). SMOG: Roman-poema (in Russian). Moskva. ISBN 978-5-94282-468-6.
- Batshev, Vladimir (2009). SMOG: Pokolenie s perebitymi nogami (in Russian). USA: Franc-Tireur. ISBN 978-0-557-13929-3.
