= Znamensk, Astrakhan Oblast =

Closed town in Astrakhan Oblast, Russia

Znamensk Знаменск
- Town
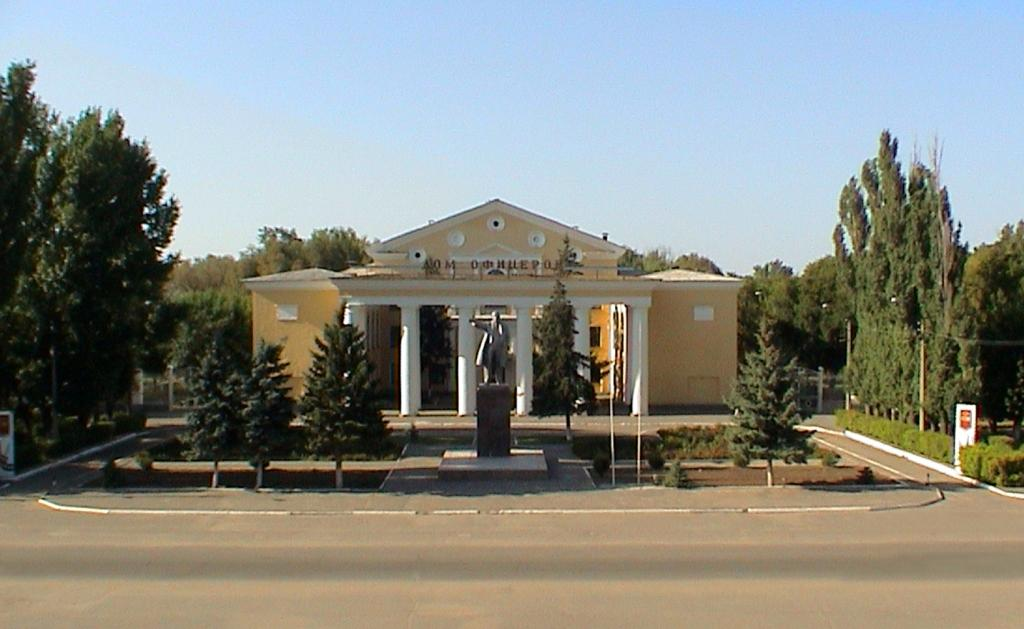
- Officers' House in Znamensk

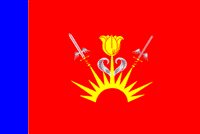
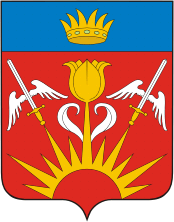
- Flag Coat of arms
- Interactive map of Znamensk
- Location of Znamensk Znamensk (Astrakhan Oblast)
- Coordinates: 48°35′N 45°45′E
- Country: Russia
- Federal subject: Astrakhan Oblast
- Founded: 1948

Government
  - City Head: V. N. Likh
- Elevation: 3 m (9.8 ft)

Population (2010 Census)
  - Total: 29,401
  - Estimate (2025): 23,487 (−20.1%)

Administrative status
  - Subordinated to: closed administrative-territorial formation of Znamensk
  - Capital of: closed administrative-territorial formation of Znamensk

Municipal status
  - Urban okrug: Znamensk Urban Okrug
  - Capital of: Znamensk Urban Okrug
- Time zone: UTC+4 (MSK+1)
- Postal code: 416540
- Dialing code: +7 85140
- OKTMO ID: 12719000001
- Website: www.znamensk.astranet.ru

Znamensk (Russian: Знаменск, IPA: [ˈznamʲɪnʲsk]) is a closed town in Astrakhan Oblast, Russia. Population: 29,401 (2010 census), 24,628 (2021 Russian census)

== History ==
It was founded in 1948 as Kapustin Yar-1 to serve a missile test range known as Kapustin Yar. Kasputin Yar-1 was granted town status in 1962. The closed town was renamed Znamensk in 1992.

The military testing range is officially known as 4GCMP (4th State Central Interspecific Test-site). Kapustin Yar is also the name of a nearby village.

== Administrative and municipal status ==
Within the framework of administrative divisions, it is incorporated as the closed administrative-territorial formation of Znamensk—an administrative unit with the status equal to that of the districts. As a municipal division, the closed administrative-territorial formation of Znamensk is incorporated as Znamensk Urban Okrug.

== Education ==
The town has twenty-one kindergartens, four middle schools, two gymnasium schools, a sports facility, and a branch of the Astrakhan State Institute.

== Transportation ==
Railway station "Razyezd 85 km" on the Volgograd-Astrakhan railway branch is located in the town. Kapustin Yar (air base) is near the town.
