= Svetlana Vasilenko =

Russian writer

- Светлана Василенко
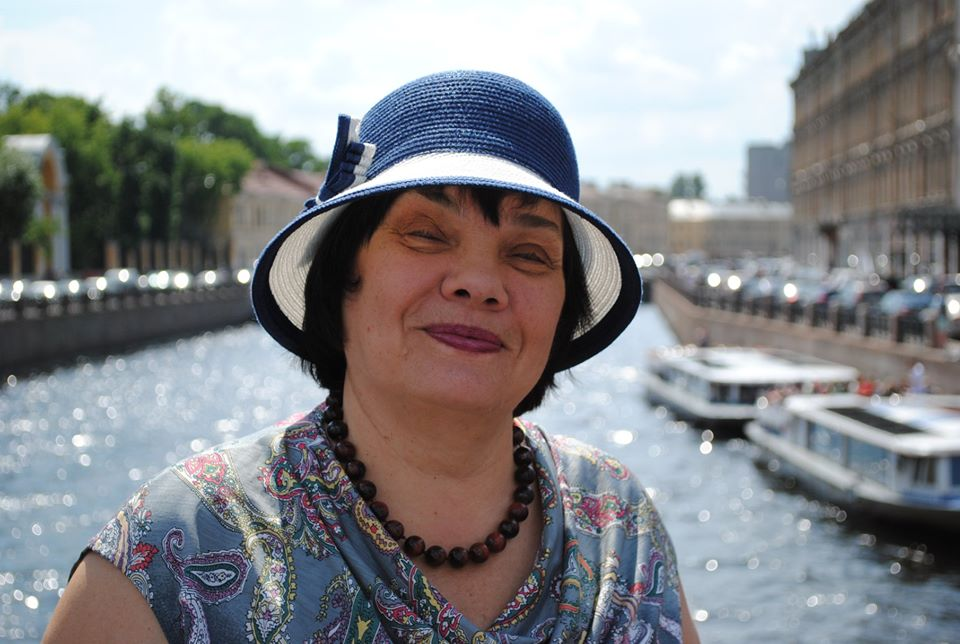
- Born: 24 January 1956 (age 70); Kapustin Yar, Soviet Union
- Education: Maxim Gorky Literature Institute
- Occupations: Writer, poet, screenwriter
- Known for: First Secretary of the Union of Russian Writers

Svetlana Vladimirovna Vasilenko (Russian: Светлана Владимировна Василенко; born 24 January 1956) is a Russian writer, "one of the most interesting writers of perestroika and post-perestroika literature".

== Life ==
Svetlana Vasilenko was born in 1956 in Kapustin Yar, an airbase built next to a cosmodrome on the Volga River. She grew up in an all-female household within this "male militarist environment" before studying at the Gorky Literary Institute, where she graduated in 1983. Though her first publication, 'Going after Goat Antelopes, received critical acclaim, it took her six years to achieve publication again. As a reaction to what she saw as the discriminatory policies of male editors. Vasilenko co-founded a feminist literary group, The New Amazons, who published anthologies of women's prose in 1990 and 1991.

Her 1998 novel Little Fool follows a 13-year-old girl growing up in Kapustin Yar at the time of the Cuban Missile Crisis. She is doubled by Ganna, a 13-year-old girl in an embedded story, who lives in 1930s Kapustin Yar, where the village inhabitants are Christians persecuted for their beliefs by the local communist regime.

Since 1996 she has been the First Secretary of the Union of Russian Writers.

== Works ==
- (ed.) Novye amazonki: sbornik. 1991.
- Durochka: roman, povestʹ, rasskazy. Moscow: Vagrius, 2000. (First published, 1998.)
- Shamara and other stories. Translated from the Russian by Helena Goscilo. Evanston, Ill.: Northwestern University Press, 2000. The work was used for 1994 German-Ukrainian movie Shamara
