= Kapustin Yar (air base) =

Russian military airfield

Kapustin Yar Vladimirovka
- Znamensk, Astrakhan Oblast in Russia
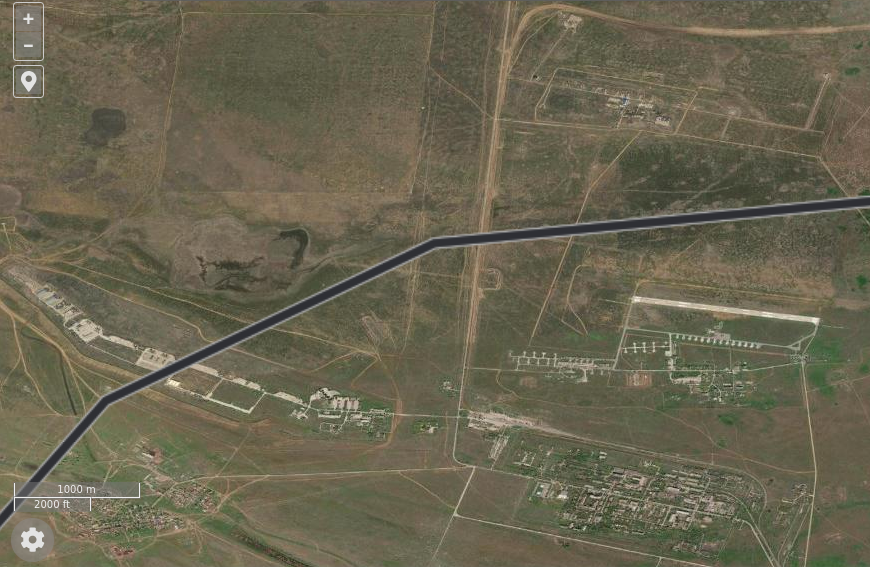
- Satellite imagery of Kapustin Yar air base

Site information
- Type: Air Base
- Owner: Ministry of Defence
- Operator: Russian Aerospace Forces

Location
- Shown within Astrakhan Oblast Kapustin Yar (Russia) Kapustin Yar (European Russia)
- Coordinates: 48°40′04″N 45°43′54″E

Site history
- Built: 1954
- In use: 1954 - present

Airfield information
Runways
| Direction | Length and surface |
|---|---|
| 09/27 | 1,170 metres (3,839 ft) Concrete |

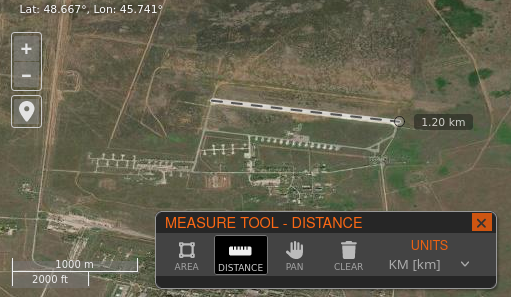
NASA's FIRMS shows runway 09/27 to be 1.20 km

Kapustin Yar is a military airfield near the town of Znamensk, Astrakhan Oblast, serving the Kapustin Yar military training ground, founded in 1946. Until the 1990s, the airfield had the code name "Picture" (previously – "Constitution").

Classed as an Airfield 3rd class. The 35th independent mixed air squadron (military unit 33782) is based at the airfield, equipped with MI-8 helicopters, with AN-26 and AN-72 transport aircraft. Ground support for flights is provided by the 88th aviation commandant's office (military unit 54003).

As of 2024 satellite imagery showed runway 09/27 to be 1.20 km.

== History ==
In the late 1940s and early 1950s, the Zhitkur military airfield, located 52 km north-east of the current airfield and 125 km east of Volgograd, was used for aviation support of the area, with an unpaved runway 1,060 m (3,480 ft) long and 80 m (260 ft) wide. This airfield was created near the village of the same name in the Pallas district of the Stalingrad region in the summer of 1942 during the Battle of Stalingrad. At the same time, up to 10 regiments of fighter, assault and bomber aviation of the 8th Air Army of the RKKA USSR Air Force were simultaneously based on the airfield. In 1953, due to the expansion of the Kapustin Yar test site, the village of Zhitkur ceased to exist, residents were relocated to other locations.

The 19th Separate Mixed Aviation Squadron (military unit 20669) to service the testing ground Kapustin Yar was formed in 1954 at the airfield of military unit 15650 in Vladimirovka village (now the city Akhtubinsk). The squadron consisted of three units: a transport unit of three aircraft Li-2, a helicopter unit of three helicopters Mi-4 and a light-engine unit on aircraft An-2, Yak-12 and По-2. Later aircraft appeared IL-12, and then IL-14.

Since 1955, the squadron aircraft began to fly to the Experimental Test Stations (OIS) of the Kapustin Yar test site located in the vicinity of Kazakhstan settlements New Kazanka, Makat, Aralsk. Somewhat later, a flight of aircraft Yak-12 of the 19th Separate Mixed Squadron began to be based at the Aralsk airfield, which performed tasks for the delivery of measurement information and the search for products.

In 1956, the squadron was relocated to a newly created airfield at the present location from a dirt runway. The airfield received the conditional name Constitution .

In 1958, a concrete runway was built at the aerodrome, which made it possible to carry out flights without fail during the autumn and spring soaking season.

On 2 November 1959, the squadron was reorganized into the 158th separate mixed air regiment. The first commander of the regiment was an inspector-pilot of the Air Force of the North Caucasus Military District, a military pilot of the 1st class, Colonel SK Teterkin

In 1970, the regiment received helicopters MI-8.

In 1989, the plane IL-14 was excluded from the regimental state, and the An-72 aircraft unit was switched on.

In 2009, the 158th air regiment was reorganized into the 35th separate air squadron, which was transferred from RVSN to Air Force of the Russian Federation.

== See also ==
- List of military airbases in Russia
