= Glasnost meeting =

1965 Soviet civil rights protest

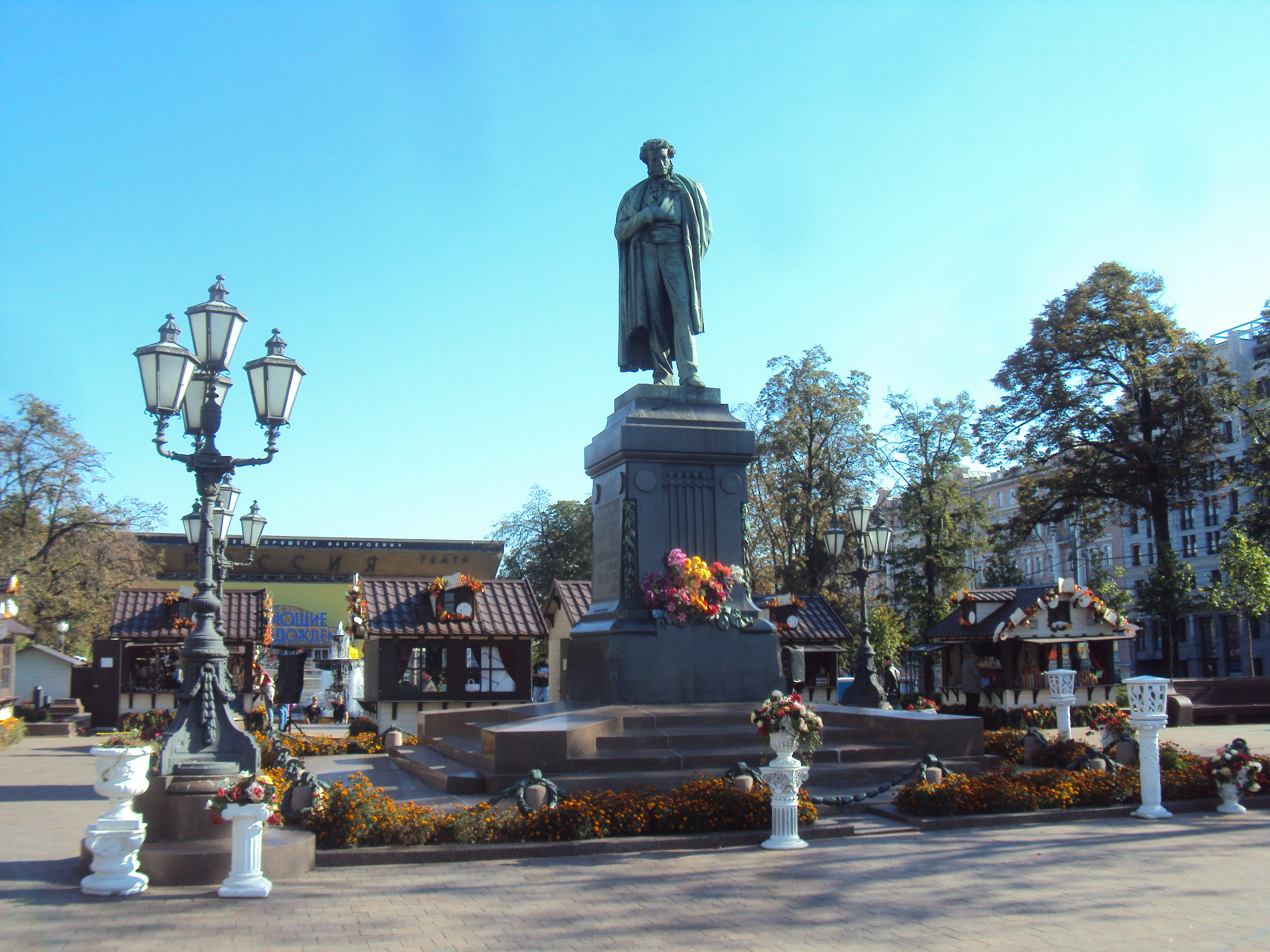
Monument to A.S. Pushkin, Pushkinskaya Square., Tverskaya, Central District, Moscow

The glasnost meeting (Russian: Ми́тинг гла́сности, romanized: Míting glásnosti, lit. 'meeting of openness'), also known as the glasnost rally, was the first spontaneous public political demonstration in the Soviet Union after the Second World War. It took place in Moscow on 5 December 1965 as a response to the trial of writers Andrei Sinyavsky and Yuli Daniel. The demonstration is considered to mark the beginning of a movement for civil rights in the Soviet Union.

== Demonstration ==
=== Background ===
In September 1965, writers Andrei Sinyavsky and Yuli Daniel were arrested and accused of having published anti-Soviet material in foreign editorials. The prosecution argued that the writings amounted to the criminal offense codified in Article 70 of the RSFSR Criminal code, anti-Soviet agitation and propaganda.

While most Russian critics of the trial emphasized issues of conscience and creative freedom, a small minority headed by mathematician Alexander Esenin-Volpin took another position. They were convinced that legitimate criticism should focus on the fact that the proceedings were not in adherence to existing law, specifically to the provisions guaranteeing an open trial.

=== Preparation ===
Alexander Esenin-Volpin, together with physicist Valery Nikolsky, artist Yuri Titov and Titov's wife Elena Stroeva, began to plan a gathering in Pushkin Square, across the street from the office of the newspaper Izvestia. The date chosen was 5 December, the official holiday celebrating the ratification of the 1936 "Stalin" Constitution by the Congress of Soviets. The meeting itself was to exemplify strict obedience to the Constitution, which guaranteed freedom of assembly and meetings. The participants were to restrict themselves to the single demand for an open trial for Sinyavsky and Daniel, as per Article 111.

Responses to this proposal by their acquaintances were mostly negative. Many saw the idea as utopian and dangerous: While it was unclear whether the meeting would help Sinyavsky and Daniel, participants in any such meeting were likely to be arrested, their careers ruined. The idea of such a "glasnost meeting" did find support among small circles of high school and university students such as Irina Yakir, Yuri Galanskov, Yuliya Vishnevskaya, and Vladimir Bukovsky, who learned of the plan through the informal networks of the Moscow intelligentsia. Among them were several veterans of the unofficial Mayakovsky Square poetry readings and the literary group SMOG.

A one-page "Civic Appeal" (Гражданское обращение) was drafted by Volpin and Nikolsky. It was distributed via samizdat and disseminated by supporters around Moscow University and other liberal-arts institutions. Citing the articles of the Soviet Constitution and the Code of Criminal Procedure regarding open courts, the appeal reminded readers of the "millions of Soviet citizens" who had perished because of official lawlessness:

The bloody past calls us to vigilance in the present. It is easier to sacrifice a single day of rest than to endure for years the consequences of an arbitrariness that was not checked in time. Citizens have a means for struggle against judicial arbitrariness—a “glasnost meeting” during which those who gather will project a single slogan: “We demand an open trial for . . . (followed by the names of the accused).” Any other phrases or slogans going beyond the demand for strict observance of the law will be absolutely detrimental and possibly serve as a provocation and should be cut short by the meeting’s participants themselves. During the meeting it is essential that order be strictly observed. At the first demand by the authorities to disperse—one must disperse, having communicated to the authorities the meeting’s aim.

=== Demonstration ===
On 5 December, about 50 participants and roughly 200 sympathetic observers gathered on Pushkin Square. Signs were unfurled with the slogans "Respect the Soviet Constitution" and "We demand an open trial for Sinyavsky and Daniel." The meeting itself lasted less than twenty minutes. KGB officials sent to monitor the gathering quickly confiscated the signs and detained their bearers for several hours.

About forty participating and onlooking students were expelled from their universities. Yuliya Vishnevskaya and Leonid Gubanov were held in a psychiatric ward for a month for distributing the appeal. Vladimir Bukovsky had been arrested three days before the planned demonstration and was held in a ward for eight months.

== Aftermath ==
=== Publicity ===
While the Soviet press ignored the event, it was picked up by Western media such as the New York Times. The BBC and Voice of America broadcast the news into the USSR. Possibly owing to the publicity of the demonstration in the West, the trial was declared open. In fact, only people with special passes approved by the KGB were allowed to enter the court building, and the proceedings and records remained closed to foreign observers.

=== Dissident movement ===
The demonstration is considered the first organized action of the Soviet dissident movement. Similarly, the spontaneous, uncensored production and circulation of the "Civic Appeal" was one of the first uses of informal networks of text-sharing, later called "samizdat", for political purposes.

"Glasnost meetings" on 5 December became an annual event in Moscow. They attracted a range of guests including the physicist Andrei Sakharov, who joined the event on Constitution Day 1966 after an invitation to gather "five-ten minutes before six p.m. and exactly at six, remove out hats with the others, as a sign of respect for the Constitution and to stand in silence, bare-headed, for one minute." The meetings continued until Constitution Day was moved to 7 October in 1977.

The "legalist" approach of demanding that existing laws and guaranteed rights be observed by the state was taken up by subsequent dissident figures. So-called defenders of rights (pravozashchitniki or zakonniki) avoided moral and political commentary in favor of close attention to legal and procedural issues. It became a common cause for diverse social groups in the dissident milieu, ranging from academics to activists in the youth subculture. Underground coverage of arrests and trials became more common and led to the founding of the Chronicle of Current Events in April 1968. The unofficial newsletter reported violations of civil rights and judicial procedure by the Soviet government and responses to those violations by citizens across the USSR.

The rights-based strategy of dissent soon merged with the idea of human rights. The years following the Soviet Union's signing of the International Covenant on Civil and Political Rights in 1968 saw the emergence of a Soviet human rights movement. It included figures such as Valery Chalidze, Yuri Orlov, and Lyudmila Alexeyeva. Special groups were founded such as the Initiative Group for the Defense of Human Rights in the USSR (1969), the Committee on Human Rights in the USSR (1970) and the Helsinki Watch Groups in Moscow, Kiev, Vilnius, Tbilisi, and Erevan (1976–77).

== Other ==
In 1995, a book featuring recollections of the meeting by the participants was published by Memorial.

The demonstration is also recounted in the 2005 documentary They Chose Freedom.

== See also ==
- Sinyavsky–Daniel trial
- 1968 Red Square demonstration
- Glasnost

== Bibliography ==
- Alexeyeva, Lyudmila; John Glad (1987). Soviet Dissent: Contemporary Movements for National, Religious, and Human Rights. Carol Pearce (trans.). Middletown, Conn.: Wesleyan University Press. ISBN 0-8195-6176-2.
- Alexeyeva, Lyudmila (1993). The Thaw Generation: Coming of Age in the Post-Stalin Era. Pittsburgh, PA: University of Pittsburgh Press. ISBN 978-0822959113.
- Nathans, Benjamin (2007). "The Dictatorship of Reason: Aleksandr Vol'pin and the Idea of Human Rights under Developed Socialism" (PDF). Slavic Review. 66 (4): 630–663. doi:10.2307/20060376. JSTOR 20060376. S2CID 159974080.
- A. Roginskii, A. Danielʹ; et al., eds. (2005). 5 dekabria 1965 goda: v vospominaniiakh uchastnikov sobytii, materialakh samizdata, publikatsiiakh zarubezhnoii pressy i v dokumentakh partiinykh i komsomolʹskikh organizatsii i v zapiskakh Komiteta gosudarstvannoi beznopasnosti v TsK KPSS (in Russian). Moscow: Memorial: Zvenʹia. ISBN 5787000862.
