= Union of Russian Writers =

Russian writers' organization founded in 1991

- Союз российских писателей
- Abbreviation: SRP
- Formation: 1991
- Type: Writers' organization
- Headquarters: 52 Povarskaya Street, Moscow, Russia
- Members: more than 3,500 (union figure, 2021)
- First Secretary: Svetlana Vasilenko
- Website: writers.ru

The Union of Russian Writers (Russian: Союз российских писателей, romanized: Soyuz rossiyskikh pisateley) is a Russian writers' organization founded in 1991 amid the break-up of the Union of Soviet Writers. It is a separate body from the Union of Writers of Russia, with which it is frequently confused; the Canadian scholar N. N. Shneidman describes the two as the "patriotic" and the "liberal" camps into which Russian literary life divided after 1991. The union states that it has more than 3,500 members in about 60 regional organizations.

The writer and screenwriter Svetlana Vasilenko has been first secretary of the union's board since 1996.

== History ==
=== Break-up of the Soviet writers' union ===
Under Soviet rule professional writers were organized in the single Union of Soviet Writers (1934–1991), which administered literary life and the writers' social infrastructure. During perestroika the union divided along political lines, a conflict that surfaced publicly in the conservative "Letter of the Seventy-Four" of 1990.

Accounts of the new union's founding give different dates for different stages. In September 1991 The New York Times reported that the conservative Russian Federation Writers' Union had announced its separation from the Union of Soviet Writers, and that the authors of a proposal for a new Union of Russian Writers included Yevgeny Yevtushenko. In a 2025 interview with the journal Moskva, Vasilenko said that during the summer of 1991 writers had left regional branches of the Soviet union and formed new organizations in Moscow, Saint Petersburg, Krasnoyarsk, Irkutsk, Yekaterinburg and Kaliningrad, that after the August 1991 coup they decided to create a common union, and that the founding congress was held in October 1991 in the conference hall of the Soviet writers' union building at 52 Povarskaya Street in Moscow. The union's own account dates its formation to 17 December 1991.

An obituary of Bella Akhmadulina in The Independent states that after the Soviet collapse she helped establish the new union together with Rimma Kazakova and Andrei Voznesensky. According to Vasilenko, the initiators also included the academician Dmitry Likhachev, Viktor Astafyev, Yuri Nagibin, Fazil Iskander, Roman Solntsev and Kirill Kovaldzhi, and the union's first first secretary was the Ural writer Aleksandr Ivanchenko, whom Vasilenko succeeded in 1996. The union additionally names Sergey Zalygin, Anatoly Zhigulin, Vladimir Sokolov, Vladimir Makanin and Andrei Bitov among those present at its origins.

Vasilenko has said that after the split the successor organizations lost most of the property inherited from the Soviet era, including the Litfond clinic, the houses of creativity, the Sovetsky Pisatel publishing house and several literary journals.

=== Later history ===
The union holds regular congresses; its sixth opened in Penza on 23 May 2019. On 17 December 2021 it marked its thirtieth anniversary.

In December 2020 the union was one of five founding members of the Association of Writers' and Publishers' Unions of Russia, together with the Union of Writers of Russia, the writers' unions of Moscow and Saint Petersburg and the Russian Book Union; Sergey Shargunov was elected its chairman. In 2021 the "Rostov House" mansion on Povarskaya Street, once the seat of the Soviet writers' union, was transferred to the association. In early 2025 the association announced that it was ending its work.

== Distinction from the Union of Writers of Russia ==
The Union of Russian Writers is a different organization from the Union of Writers of Russia (Russian: Союз писателей России), which presents itself as the successor of the writers' union of the RSFSR, founded in 1958. The two are frequently confused in English-language sources.

The distinction drew attention again in 2025, when the former Minister of Culture Vladimir Medinsky was elected chairman of the Union of Writers of Russia at an extraordinary congress on 27 February 2025. In his address Medinsky described the restoration of a single writers' union as "a serious task and one of the most important state priorities". Vasilenko has said that the board of the Union of Russian Writers responded by proposing a simplified admission procedure for the roughly 4,000 members of the unions formed out of the Soviet writers' union.

In some regions the 1991 split was reproduced locally. The Krasnoyarsk writers' organization, for example, divided in 2001 into a regional branch of the Union of Writers of Russia and a regional office of the Union of Russian Writers. In Tomsk, by contrast, the two local branches merged into a single regional writers' organization in early 2008.

== Leadership and membership ==
The union is led collectively: co-chairs are elected from among the heads of the larger regional organizations, while the first secretary handles current business. As of 2021 the co-chairs were Oleg Glushkin, Yuri Kublanovsky, Mikhail Kuraev, Arsen Titov and Nikolai Shamsutdinov.

The writer, publisher and photographer Levon Osepyan served as the union's organizational secretary from 11 December 2012 until his death on 1 July 2024.

Vasilenko, who was born in Kapustin Yar and graduated from the Maxim Gorky Literature Institute, is also a member of the Russian PEN Centre and chairs the organizing committee of the International Voloshin Prize. In January 2026 the Higher School of Economics marked her seventieth birthday, describing her as first secretary of the union's board.

Besides its founders, the union states that its members have included Mikhail Kuraev, Yuri Kublanovsky, Oleg Chukhontsev, Alexander Kushner, Valery Popov and Ruslan Kireev.

== Regional organizations ==
The union states that its largest branches are in Moscow, Saint Petersburg, Voronezh, Ryazan, Smolensk, Vologda, Yekaterinburg, Krasnoyarsk, Irkutsk, Omsk, Tomsk, Kemerovo, Tyumen, Kaliningrad, Rostov-on-Don, Kazan and other cities, and that regional branches publish their own journals and almanacs, among them Den i Noch (Krasnoyarsk), Baltika (Kaliningrad), Argamak (Kazan), Skladchina (Omsk) and Kamenny Most (Tomsk).

The Smolensk branch is listed by the regional culture department as having been formed in 1992 by former members of the Soviet writers' union. In Omsk, the branch was registered in 1993 and was chaired by the writer and journalist Alexander Leifer from its foundation until his death in 2017. In Yekaterinburg, the branch has been chaired for many years by Arsen Titov, who in 2024 published a history of the organization. In Kaliningrad, the writers' organization headed by Oleg Glushkin joined the new union, and Glushkin founded the journal Zapad Rossii in 1991. In Voronezh, the branch is chaired by Galina Umyvakina, a member of the union's board. The Tomsk branch was registered in 2004 on the initiative of the poet Ruth Tamarina.

== Activities ==
=== Voloshin Prize ===
The union is a co-founder of the International Voloshin Competition, Prize and Festival held in Koktebel in association with the Voloshin house-museum, now part of the Kimmeria M. A. Voloshina museum-reserve. Within that forum the union awards a special prize "For the Preservation of the Traditions of Russian Poetry"; in 2015 it went to the Kaluga poet Marina Ulybysheva for the best poetry book of 2014.

=== Mandelstam monument ===
In 2008 the union's Voronezh branch, together with the Mandelstam Society, proposed a monument to the poet Osip Mandelstam in Voronezh, a project reported by Radio Svoboda. The monument, sculpted by Lazar Gadaev, was unveiled on 2 September 2008 at the entrance to the Orlyonok park; a delegation of the union attended.

=== Young writers, publishing and professional standards ===
Vasilenko has said that the union holds seminars for young writers across Russia's federal districts, including a recurring event titled "We Grew Up in Russia", and publishes books and almanacs with support from the Ministry of Culture and the Ministry of Digital Development. The union states that its own publishing house has issued books by Anatoly Zhigulin, Yevgeny Blazheyevsky, Nikolai Golub and Vladimir Korobov, as well as anthologies of the union's poetry and prose.

In December 2025 the Russian Ministry of Labour approved a professional standard for the occupation of writer, developed by the Association of Writers' and Publishers' Unions of Russia with the participation of the Union of Russian Writers, the Union of Writers of Russia, the writers' unions of Moscow and Saint Petersburg, the Russian Book Union and the Maxim Gorky Literature Institute.

== See also ==
- Union of Soviet Writers
- Union of Writers of Russia
- Svetlana Vasilenko
