= Yuri Kublanovsky =

Russian writer (born 1947)

Yury Kublanovsky
- Юрий Кублановский
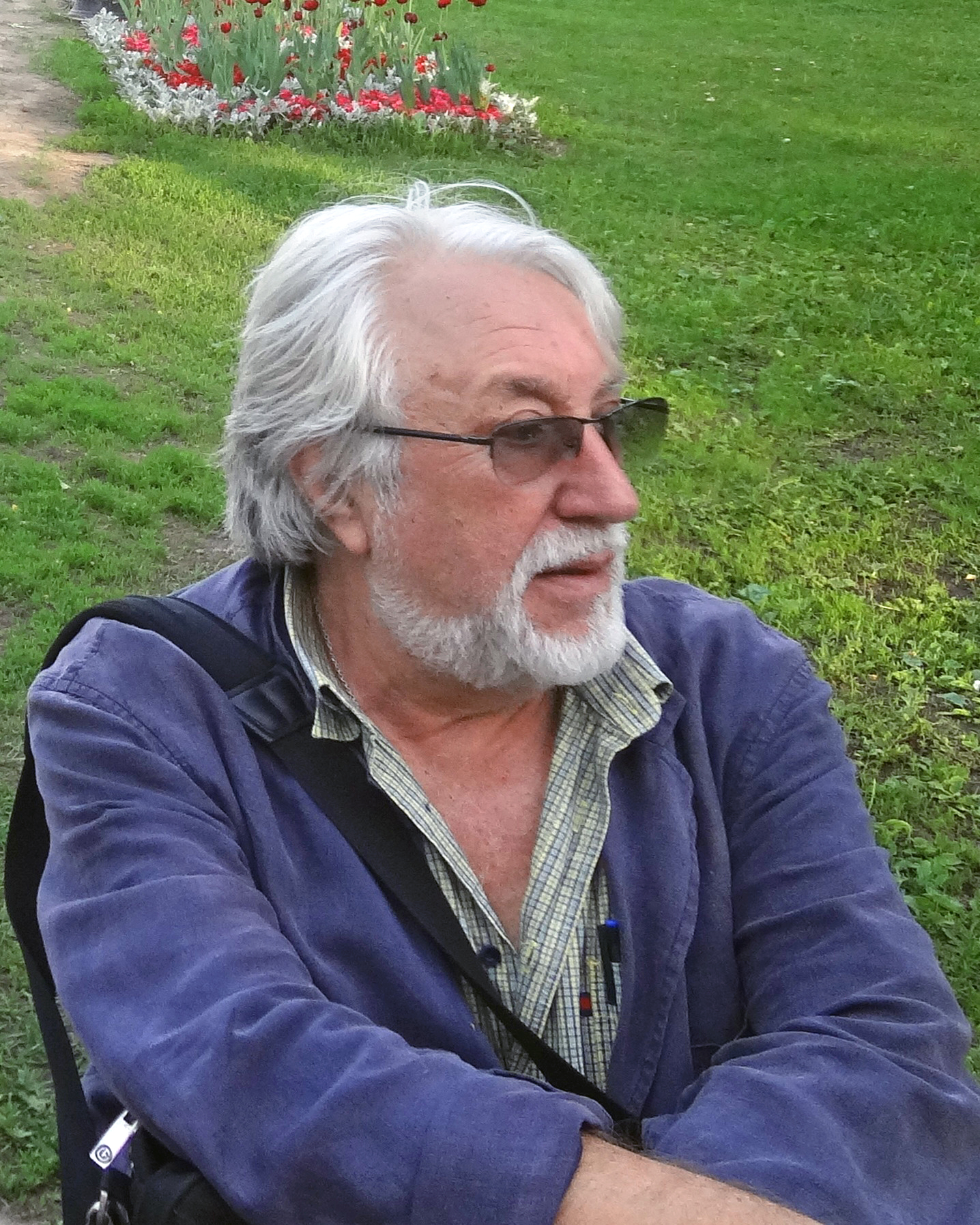
- Kublanovsky in 2015
- Born: 30 April 1947 (age 78); Scherbakov, Soviet Union
- Occupations: Poet, essayist, critic
- Known for: Co-chairman of the Union of Russian Writers

Yury Mikhaylovich Kublanovsky (Russian: Ю́рий Миха́йлович Кублано́вский; b. 30 April 1947, Rybinsk) is a Russian poet, essayist, critic and art historian. He is the author of dozens of lyrical books appearing in America, France, and Russia. He is known for his dissident past in the former Soviet Union as a member of the post-Stalinist informal literary union, SMOG.

== Biography ==
Yuri Kublanovsky was born in 1947 into a family of an actor, his father Mikhail Naumovich Kublanovsky (1910-1975), and a teacher of Russian literature. His grandfather, a priest, was shot in 1930. His grandmother kept the spirit of pre-revolutionary Russia in her household. Despite the fact that his parents were communists, he was baptized.

He was fond of painting, with ten years of experience in the art studio at one time aspired to be a painter. Poems, by his own admission, he began to write when he was 14 or 15 years old. He started with the avant-garde, considering that resisting or opposing official Soviet literature can only be done in obscure or non-traditional ways. In the early years of the Khrushchev Thaw, he appeared in print, taking the example of Western surrealists and Russian futurists. In 1962 he went to Moscow and showed his poems to Andrey Voznesensky, who approved them.

From October 1982 to 1990 he lived as an emigre in Paris and Munich. Joseph Brodsky and Solzhenitsyn praised his poetry.

He supports Putin and the Russian invasion of Ukraine.

== Awards ==
Kublanovsky has received the Solzhenitsyn Prize, Mandelstam Prize, New Pushkin Prize. In 2016 he became a member of the Board of Trustees Fazil Iskander International Literary Award

== Poem books ==
- Избранное. — Ann Arbor: Ardis, 1981;
- С последним солнцем. — Paris: La Presse Libre, 1983 (afterword by Joseph Brodsky);
- Оттиск. — Paris: YMCA-Press, 1985;
- Затмение. — Paris, YMCA-Press, 1989;
- Возвращение. — Moscow: Правда, 1990;
- Оттиск. — Moscow, 1990;
- Чужбинное. — Moscow: Моск. рабочий, 1993;
- Число. — Moscow: изд-во Московского клуба, 1994;
- Памяти Петрограда. — Saint Petersburg: Пушкинский фонд, 1994;
- Голос из хора. — Paris-Moscow-New-York, 1995;
- Заколдованный дом. — Moscow: Русский путь, 1998;
- Дольше календаря. — Moscow: Русский путь, 2001;
- В световом году. — Moscow: Русский путь, 2001. — ISBN 5-85887-129-1;
- На обратном пути. — Moscow: Русскій міръ, 2006. — ISBN 5-89577-087-8;
- Дольше календаря. — Moscow: Время, 2006;
- Перекличка. — Moscow: Время, 2009;
- Посвящается Волге. — Rybinsk: Медиарост, 2010;
- Изборник. — Irkutsk: Издатель Сапронов, 2011;
- Чтение в непогоду: Избранное. — Moscow: Викмо-М; Русский путь, 2012, — ISBN 978-5-98454-026-1, 978-5-85887-422-5.
- Неисправные времена. — М.: Вифсаида: Русский путь, 2015. — ISBN 978-5-9903480-3-5.
- Долгая переправа: 2001—2017. — М.: Б.С.Г.-Пресс, 2017. — ISBN 978-5-93381-377-4.
- Crépuscule d'impressioniste. — Париж: Le Castor Astral, 2018. — ISBN 979-10-278-0149-7.
