= Kapustin Yar =

Rocket range in Astrakhan Oblast, Russia

- Капустин Яр
- Russian Federation
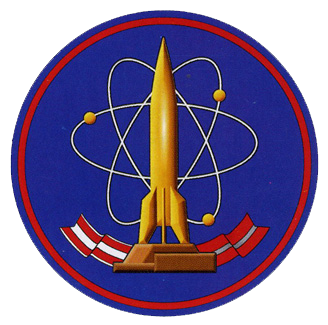

Site information
- Owner: Russian Federation
- Controlled by: Russian Aerospace Forces

Location
- Location within Russia Location within Astrakhan Oblast
- Coordinates: 48.59°N 45.72°E

Site history
- Built: 1946
- Built by: Soviet Union

Kapustin Yar (Russian: Капустин Яр) is a Russian military training area and a rocket launch complex in Astrakhan Oblast, about 100 km east of Volgograd. It was established by the Soviet Union on 13 May 1946. In the beginning, Kapustin Yar used technology and material taken from Nazi Germany after World War II, as well as forced research by imprisoned German scientists. Numerous launches of test rockets for the Russian military were carried out at the site, as well as satellite and sounding rocket launches. The towns of Znamensk and Kapustin Yar were built nearby to serve the missile test range.

== Name ==
The nearby village, Kapustin Yar, was used as the operations base in the early days of the testing site. The name can be translated as "cabbage ravine".

== History ==
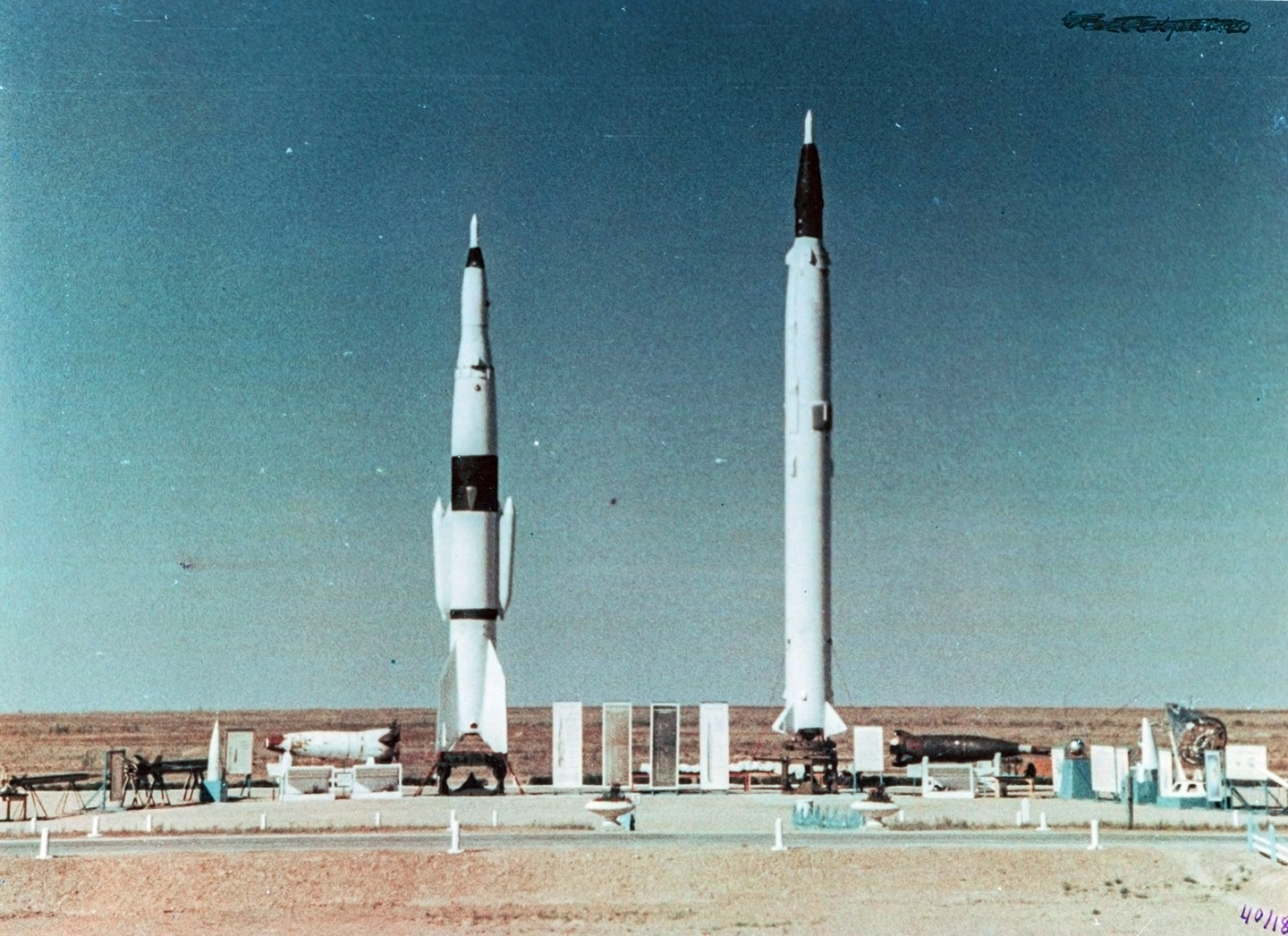
R-2A and R-5A geophysical rockets

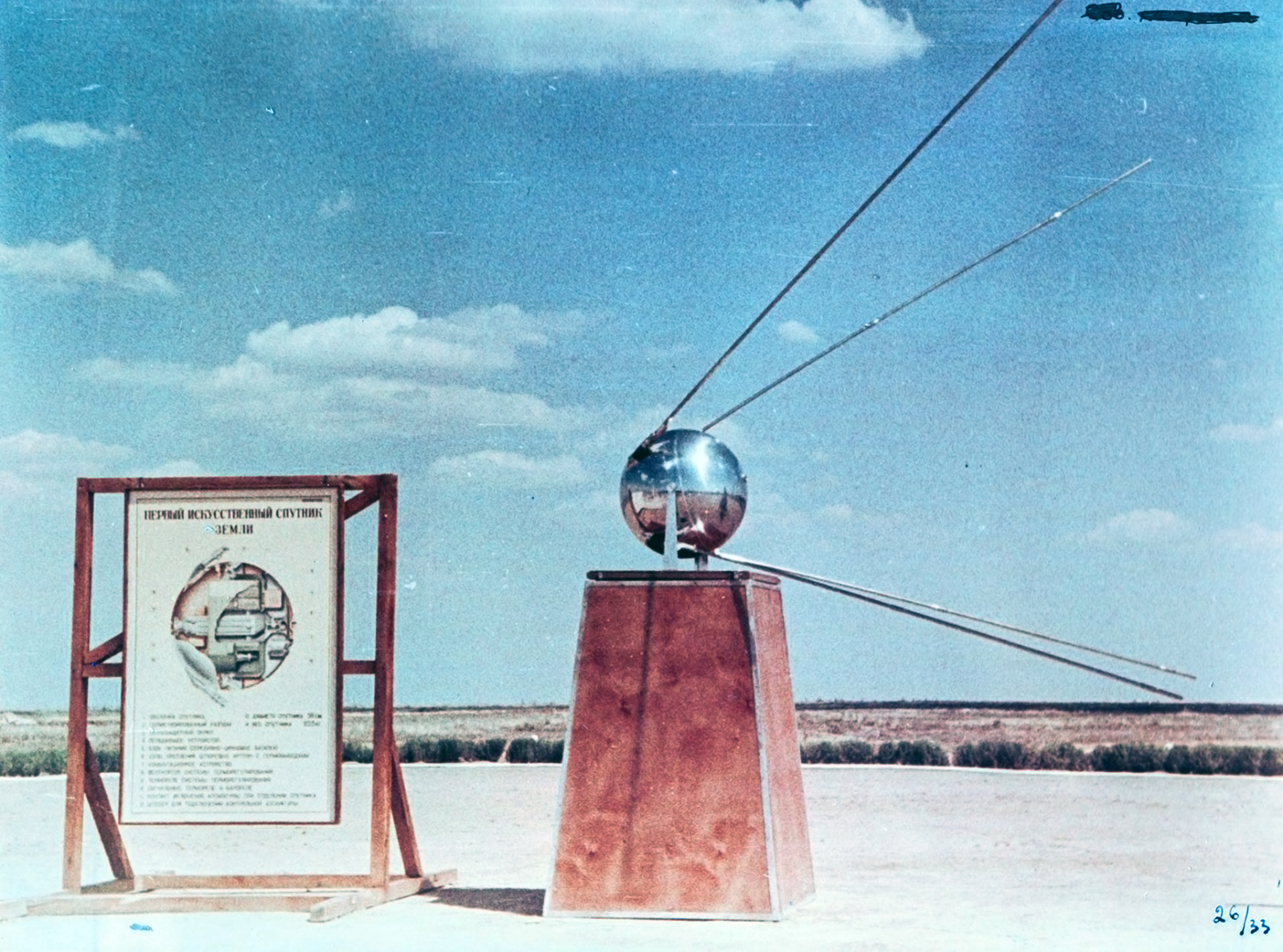
Layout of the first Sputnik-1 satellite at the test site

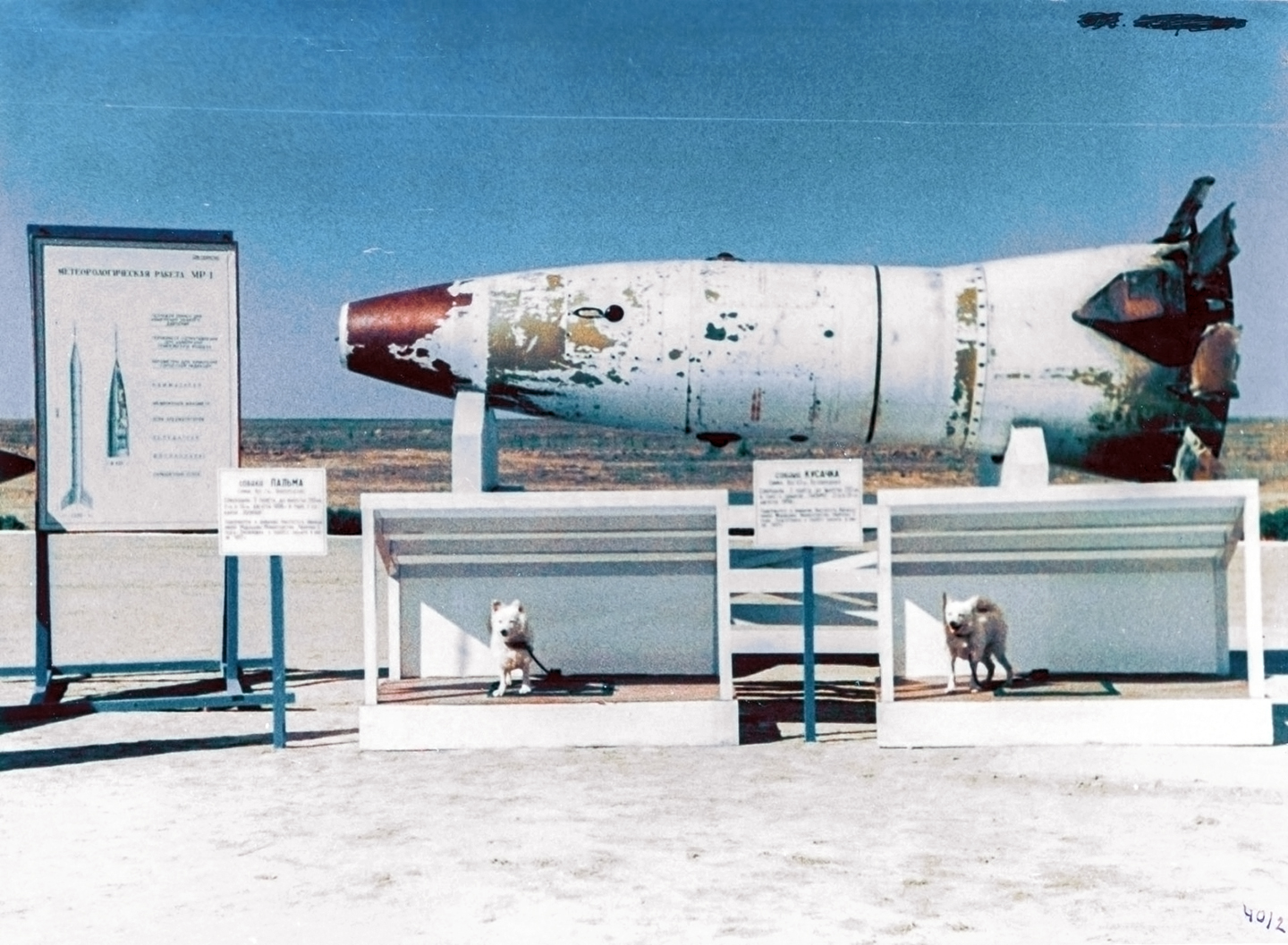
R-2A rocket with two test dogs (Palma and Kusachka)

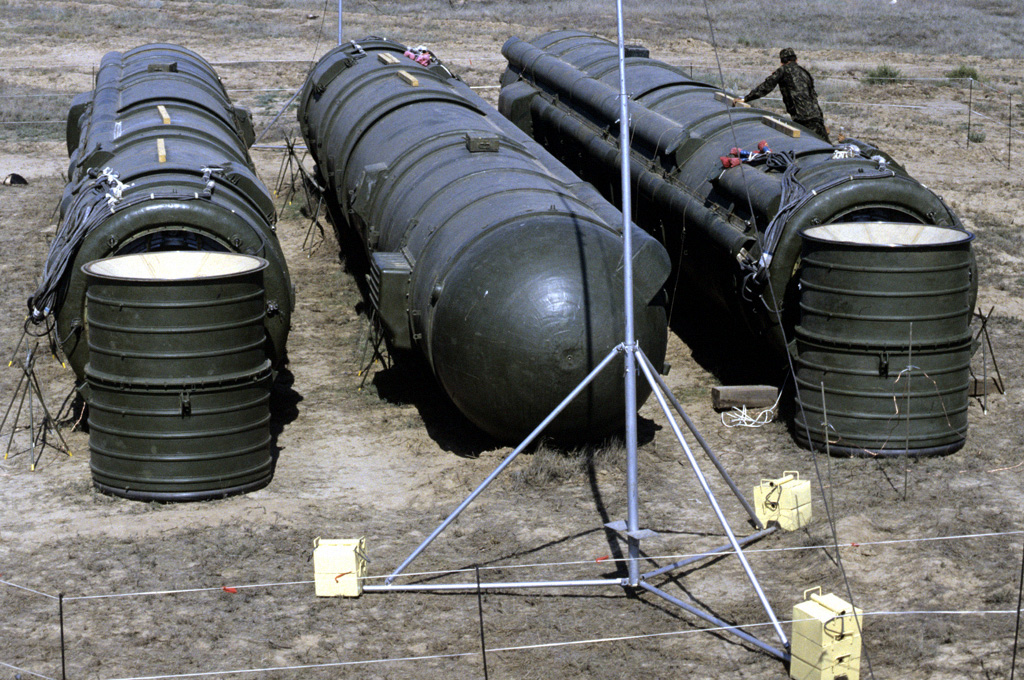
RSD-10 missiles prepared for destruction

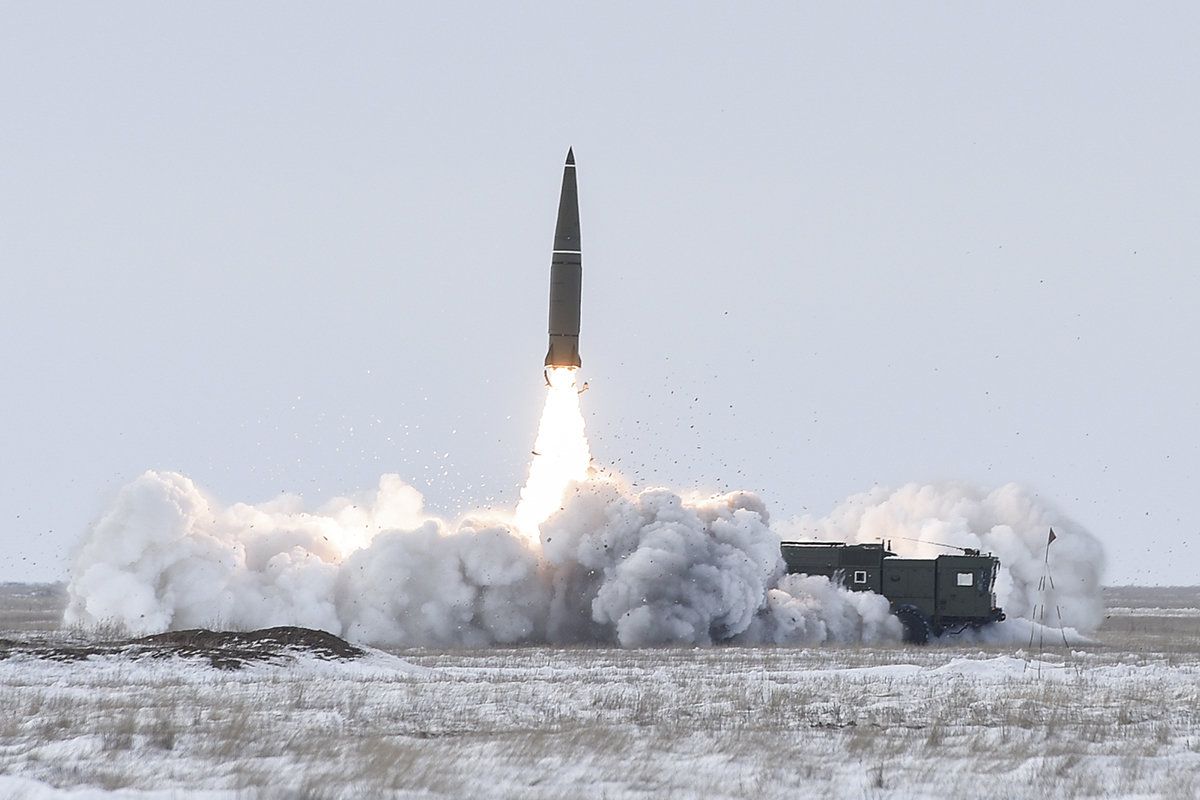
Launch of an Iskander-M ballistic missile at the Kapustin Yar proving ground

=== Overview ===
The 4th Missile Test Range "Kapustin Yar" was established by a decree of the Soviet government in "On Questions of Jet Propelled Weapons" on 13 May 1946. The test range was created in the desert north end of the Astrakhan region under the supervision of Lieutenant General Vasily Ivanovich Voznyuk, who served as commander of the range from 1946 until 1973. The first rocket was launched from the site on 18 October 1947; it was one of eleven German A-4s that had been captured.

As of 1959, Kapustin Yar was the only publicly known Soviet missile test range. Non-Soviet observers believed at first that Sputnik 1 and Sputnik 2 launched from the site. With the further growth and development, Kapustin Yar became a cosmodrome, serving this function since 1966. The rate of space launches was very low, usually 1–2 a year, and during the Soviet era it hosted only the two smallest launch vehicles: the R-12 and R-14 derived Kosmos boosters. There were no space launches from 1988 to 1998. The town of Znamensk was established to support the scientists working on the facilities, their families, and supporting personnel. Initially, this was a secret city, not shown on maps and requiring official permission to visit.

=== Creation ===
On 3 June 1947, by the Resolution of the Council of Ministers of the USSR and the Central Committee of the CPSU (b) No. 2642–817, Kapustin Yar was designated as the location of the new rocket test site. Voznyuk was appointed head of the training ground. The first officers arrived at the future training ground on 20 August 1947. In September 1947, a special brigade of the Reserve of the Supreme Main Command, Major General of Artillery, arrived from Germany with A. F. Tveretsky (the 22nd BON RVGK since 1950), plus two special trains with equipment taken from Germany.

By the beginning of October 1947, in addition to the concrete test stand and bunker at the first site, a launch site with a bunker, a temporary technical position, and an installation building were built. Additionally, a highway and a 20-kilometer railway line connecting the site with the main highway to Stalingrad (Volgograd) were built. Site housing was not constructed until 1948. Until then, builders and testers lived in tents, dugouts, temporary buildings, and peasant izba in the village of Kapustin Yar.

By 1 October 1947, Voznyuk reported the site was ready for launching rockets. On 14 October 1947, the first batch of V-2 rockets arrived at the test site. On 18 October 1947 at 10:47 Moscow time, the first launch of ballistic missile in the USSR was made. From 18 October to 13 November 1947, eleven V-2 rockets were launched; seven achieved the targeted range (two with a large deviation from the set trajectory) and four failed.

From 1947 to 1957, Kapustin Yar was the only place to test Soviet ballistic missiles, including the R-1 (September–October 1948, September–October 1949), R-2 (September–October 1949), R-5 Pobeda (March 1953), R-12 Dvina, and R-14 Chusovaya, among others. During 1957–1959, the intercontinental cruise missile "Burya" started at the Kapustin Yar proving ground. On 2 September 1959, the R-12 became the first missile launched from a missile silo.

In June 1951, the State R&D Test Range No 8 (GNIIP-8, "test range S") was established at Kapustin Yar.

=== Photo-reconnaissance flights ===
Western intelligence services learned about the existence of the test site from German scientists returning to their homeland. For additional intelligence gathering, in August 1953, a specially-trained Royal Air Force reconnaissance Canberra (Canberra PR3, tail number WH726) was equipped with a unique Robin camera. (Note: The UK Government has never recognized that the flight happened, but several indirect pieces of evidence hint at it, published in the 1990s after the end of the Cold War and the collapse of the Soviet Union.) The aircraft was launched from Giebelstadt Air Base and flew over the Volga at an altitude of more than 20 km, then approached Kapustin Yar. The MiGs raised in alarm could only slightly damage the aircraft. After taking a photo of the site, the Canberra crossed the Caspian Sea and landed in Tabriz, Iran. As a result of the flight, photographs of secret objects at the site were obtained. (Note: The picture quality was not very high due to the vibration associated with the attacks of the Soviet interceptors.) The success of the operation gave impetus to the development of satellite and aerial photography programs to obtain pictures of military facilities in the USSR and other socialist countries.

=== Nuclear tests and satellite launches ===
According to open data, since the 1950s, at least 11 nuclear explosions have been conducted at the Kapustin Yar test site (between altitudes of 300 m and 5.5 km), the total capacity of which is approximately 65 times the atomic bombs dropped on Hiroshima. From 1957 to 1961, five low-yield (10–40 kilotons) atmospheric nuclear tests were performed over the site. In addition to nuclear tests, 24,000 guided missiles were exploded in Kapustin Yar, 177 samples of military equipment were tested, and 619 RSD-10 Pioneer missiles were destroyed.

On 20 May 1960, the Training Center of the Rocket Forces of the Ground Forces was established on the territory of the State Landfill. The Center was tasked with creating combat coherence of missile troops, training and retraining rocket specialists, and creating regulatory documents for all-round missile combat activities troops of the Ground Forces.

On 16 March 1962, Kapustin Yar became a cosmodrome with the launch of the Kosmos 1 satellite. Subsequently, small research satellites were launched from Kapustin Yar on light Kosmos rockets.

In subsequent years, many short- and medium-range missiles, cruise missiles, complexes, and air defense missiles were tested at the test site.

=== Recent years ===
On 8 January 1992, during a trip to Saratov Oblast, President Boris Yeltsin made a statement on the issue of the restoration of the Volga German Autonomous Soviet Socialist Republic, proposing that Soviet Germans move to Kapustin Yar instead of their legitimate territory: "...and let this land, which is filled with shells, may they cultivate it... There may be some such region in some future and there will be, or there may be some such national Volga region Germans, but only when there will be 90 percent of Germans".

In 1994, the 4 GPC Russian Ministry of Defence entered the test site Air Defense Forces. In October 1998, the 4th State Central Polygon was transformed into the 4th State Central Interspecific Polygon. In 1998, the "Sary-Shagan" test site (located in south-eastern Kazakhstan and rented by Russia) was removed from the Air Defense troops and reassigned to the 4th State Central Interspecific polygon.

In 1999, Russian troops were redeployed to the Kapustin Yar test site from the 11th State Research Test Site of the Ministry of Defense of the Russian Federation Emba (ru), due to the dismantling of the latter.

In 2008, Russia carried out 27 launches, surpassing its figure for 2007 and setting the highest number worldwide. Most (19 / 27) launches were performed from the Baikonur cosmodrome; six from the Plesetsk space launch center in Arkhangelsk Oblast; one from the Dombarovsky Air Base in Orenburg Oblast; and one from the Kapustin Yar test site.

On 9 July 2024, Ukrainian drones struck the missile testing facility at Kapustin Yar. Footage showed a building being struck and exploding. Russian officials claimed all 20 drones were shot down, while one black painted Ukrainian Bober drone crashed into a field. Subsequent satellite images showed scorch marks at the facility.

On 8 February 2026, the Ukrainian General Staff claimed to have struck the Russian test range at Kapustin Yar using FP-5 Flamingo missiles.

== Missile tests and launches ==
- October 1947 – V-2 rocket
- 18 October 1947 – Articul T (exact copy of V-2)
- 10 October 1948 – R-1 (missile)
- January 1952 – S-25 Berkut
- 3 January 1955 – R-11FM
- 20 January 1955 – R-5 Pobeda
- 2 February 1956 – R-5M with standard nuclear warhead
- 22 June 1957 – R-12
- March 1959 – R-13
- 6 July 1960 – R-14 Chusovaya
- 11 February 1962 – R-14U
- 16 March 1962 – 11K63 Cosmos
- 21 September 1974 – RT-21M RSD-10 Pioneer
- 12 February 1999 – S-400
- 3 March 2011 – S-500
- 4 March 2014 – RT-2PM Topol
- 20 May 2014 – RT-2PM Topol
- 28 November 2019 – RT-2PM Topol
- 12 April 2024 (unspecified)

== Launch pads ==
Name		Coordinates	Comment
Burya Launch Complex	Kapustin Yar Burya	48.47°N 46.32°E	Elaborate complex: horizontal assembly building, huge circular rail line, and mobile erector and launcher; built at the Soviet Vladimirovka flight test facility, south of Kapustin Yar
Area 84	Kapustin Yar LC84	48.62°N 46.30°E	3 launch pads: R-5, RT-15, R-5
Area 86	Kapustin Yar LC86	48.60°N 46.30°E	4 launch pads: Kosmos 11K63, Kosmos 63S1, Kosmos 63S1M, R-31
Area 107	Kapustin Yar LC107	48.54°N 46.30°E	3 launch pads: Kosmos 11K65M, Kosmos 65MP, R-14
Area 107	Kapustin Yar LC107	48.54°N 46.30°E	1 launch garage: mobile ICBM Topol/Topol-E
Mayak-1 silo	Kapustin Yar Mayak-1	48.60°N 46.30°E	1 launch pad: R-12
Mayak-2 silo	Kapustin Yar Mayak-2	48.57°N 46.30°E	2 launch pads: Kosmos 63S1, R-12
Pioner Launch Complex	Kapustin Yar Pioner	48.62°N 46.25°E	Rail-served launch complex
Area 1	Kapustin Yar PL1	48.40°N 46.20°E	1 launch pad: R-12
Area 87	Kapustin Yar PL87	48.56°N 46.30°E	1 launch pad: RT-2
R-1 Launch Area	Kapustin Yar R-1	48.80°N 45.67°E	
R-11 Launch Area	Kapustin Yar R-11	48.70°N 46.20°E	Naval missile test area
R-14 Silo Prototype	Kapustin Yar R-14	48.53°N 46.30°E	
R-2 Launch Area	Kapustin Yar R-2	48.78°N 45.70°E	
R-5 Initial Launch Area	Kapustin Yar R-5	48.75°N 45.75°E	
SM-49 submarine simulator	Kapustin Yar SM-49	48.67°N 46.27°E	1 launch pad: R-11FM
Sounding rocket launch area	Kapustin Yar Sounding	48.70°N 46.20°E	Site used to launch sounding rockets
V-2 Launch Area	Kapustin Yar V-2	48.55°N 45.82°E	Original site for V-2 launches in 1946; first complex at Kapustin Yar
Vertikal Launch Pad	Kapustin Yar Vertikal	48.50°N 46.78°E	1 launch pad; Site for R-5 scientific launches, located east of the primary military launch areas

== In popular culture ==
=== "The Russian Roswell" ===
Kapustin Yar has been called the "Russian Roswell"; the place where the USSR discovered, investigated or captured alien ships (UFOs). Due to its role as a development site for new technology, Kapustin Yar is also the site of numerous Soviet-era UFO sightings. This legend has spawned various television programs and Internet speculation and theories, such as speculation on the structure of an underground complex beneath the site.

=== In fiction ===
Kapustin Yar is mentioned in the story "Cradle in Orbit" by Arthur C. Clarke.

Kapustin Yar is mentioned in Alexander Gromov's novel Step to the Left, step to the Right. (M., AST, 1999.)

One of the key missions of the 2003 computer game UFO: Aftermath is the task of finding documents in an underground base located at the Kapustin Yar test site.

== See also ==
- Baikonur Cosmodrome
- Vostochny Cosmodrome
- Plesetsk Cosmodrome
- Svobodny Cosmodrome
- Area 51
- Malan Air Base
- White Sands Missile Range
