= SIFFA =

Film festival

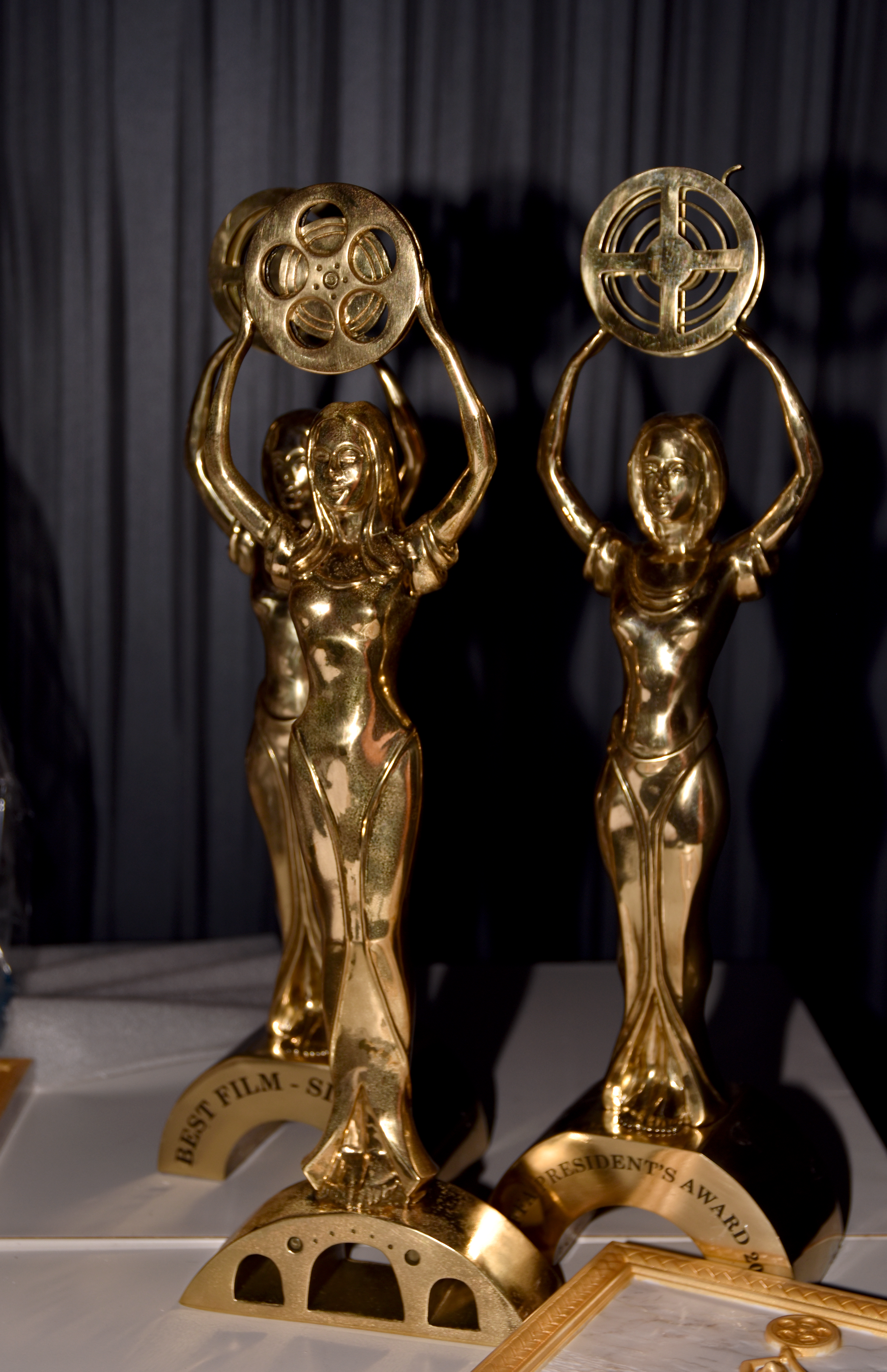
SIFFA awards

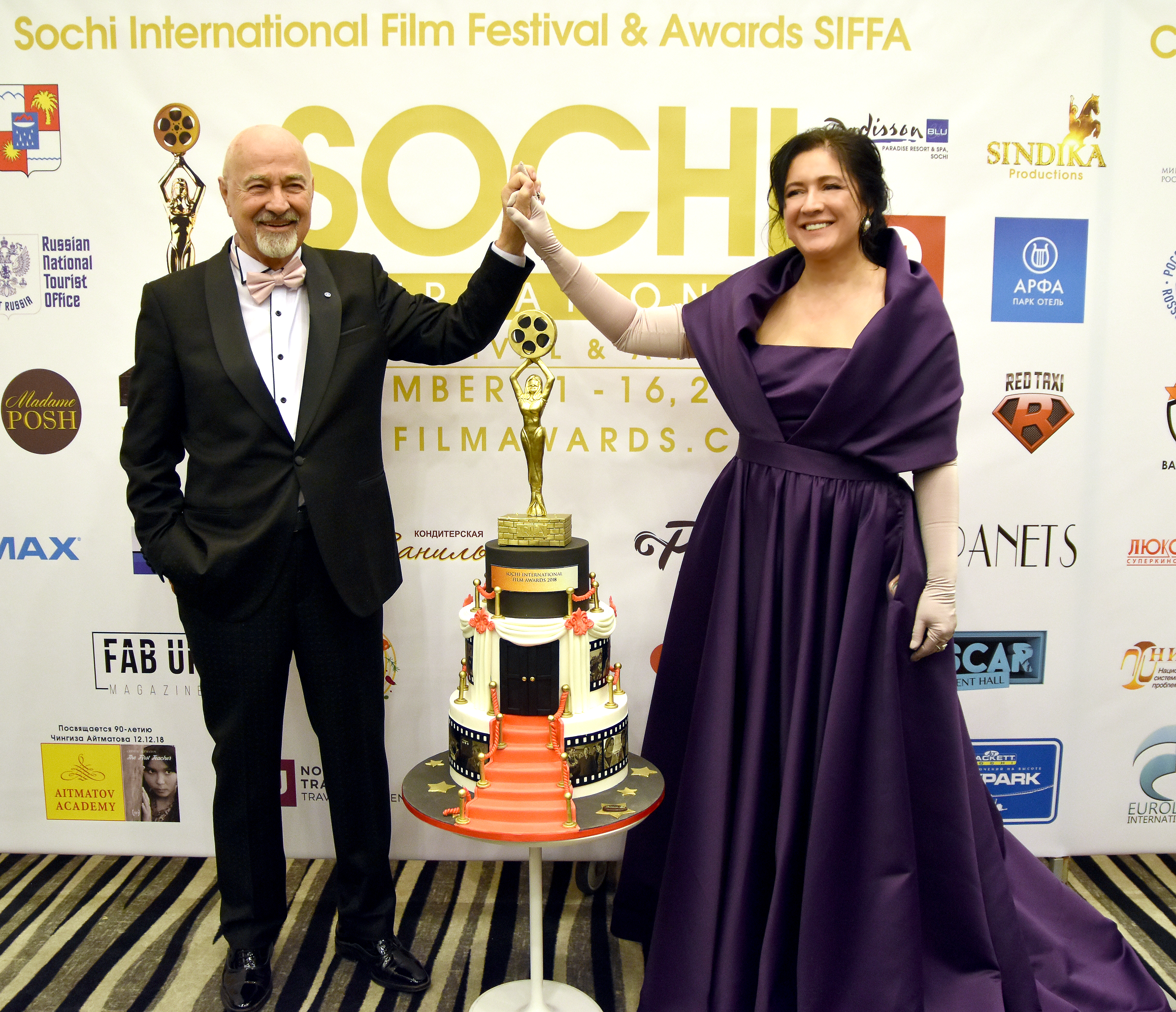
Lyubov Balagova and Mohy Quandour

The Sochi International Film Festival & Awards (SIFFA) is an international film festival founded by Russian artists. It was established in 2016 on the initiative of Lyubov Balagova-Quandour, co-founded with her husband, Mohy Quandour. Since 2022 it has been held in London under the name So Independent International Film Festival, SIFFA UK.
