= 1962 in spaceflight (July–September) =

This is a list of spaceflights launched between July and September 1962. For launches in the rest of the year, see 1962 in spaceflight (January–March), 1962 in spaceflight (April–June) and 1962 in spaceflight (October–December). For an overview of the whole year, see 1962 in spaceflight.

== Orbital launches ==
- ← Jan
- Feb
- Mar
- Apr
- May
- Jun
- Jul
- Aug
- Sep
- Oct
- Nov
- Dec →

Date and time (UTC)	Rocket	Flight number	Launch site		LSP	
Date and time (UTC)	Payload (⚀ = CubeSat)	Operator	Orbit	Function	Decay (UTC)	Outcome
Date and time (UTC)	Remarks					
=== July ===
10 July; 08:35:05	(United States) Thor DM-19 Delta	D011	(United States) Cape Canaveral LC-17B		(United States) US Air Force	
10 July; 08:35:05	(United States) Telstar 1	AT&T	Medium Earth	Communications	In orbit	Partial spacecraft failure
10 July; 08:35:05	First active communications satellite, damaged by radiation from Starfish Prime nuclear test, resulting in intermittent performance from November 1962 to 21 February 1963, when the satellite failed completely.					
18 July; 20:51:20	(United States) Atlas LV-3A Agena-B		(United States) Point Arguello LC-1-1		(United States) US Air Force	
18 July; 20:51:20	(United States) Samos-E6 3 (Samos-9/FTV-2403/AFP-201 PVP-853)	US Air Force	Low Earth	Optical imagery	27 July	Spacecraft failure
18 July; 20:51:20	Failed to deorbit, spacecraft separated from Agena whilst still in orbit, Agena decayed on 25 July.					
21 July; 00:56	(United States) Thor DM-21 Agena-B		(United States) Vandenberg LC-75-3-5		(United States) US Air Force	
21 July; 00:56	(United States) FTV-1130 (KH-4 8/9039)	NRO/CIA	Low Earth	Optical imaging	14 August	Partial spacecraft failure
21 July; 00:56	(United States) SRV-593	NRO/CIA	Low Earth	Film return	July	Successful
21 July; 00:56	Aborted after six passes, photos severely affected by static.					
22 July; 09:21:23	(United States) Atlas LV-3A Agena-B		(United States) Cape Canaveral LC-12		(United States) US Air Force	
22 July; 09:21:23	(United States) Mariner 1	NASA	Intended: Heliocentric	Venus flyby	+293 seconds	Launch failure
22 July; 09:21:23	Guidance system failure, destroyed by range safety.					
28 July; 00:30	(United States) Thor DM-21 Agena-B		(United States) Vandenberg LC-75-3-4		(United States) US Air Force	
28 July; 00:30	(United States) FTV-1131 (KH-4 9/9040)	NRO/CIA	Low Earth	Optical imaging	24 August	Partial spacecraft failure
28 July; 00:30	(United States) SRV-594	NRO/CIA	Low Earth	Film return	1 August	Successful
28 July; 00:30	Images severely affected by radiation and static.					
28 July; 09:18:31	(Soviet Union) Vostok-2		(Soviet Union) Baikonur Site 1/5		(Soviet Union)	
28 July; 09:18:31	(Soviet Union) Kosmos 7 (Sputnik 17/Zenit-2 №4)	OKB-1	Low Earth	Optical imagery	1 August	Successful
← Jan; Feb; Mar; Apr; May; Jun; Jul; Aug; Sep; Oct; Nov; Dec →; === August ===
2 August; 00:17	(United States) Thor DM-21 Agena-D		(United States) Vandenberg LC-75-1-1		(United States) US Air Force	
2 August; 00:17	(United States) FTV-1152 (KH-4 10/9041)	NRO/CIA	Low Earth	Optical imaging	26 August	Partial spacecraft failure
2 August; 00:17	(United States) SRV-595	NRO/CIA	Low Earth	Film return	6 August	Successful
2 August; 00:17	Images severely affected by static.					
5 August; 17:58:59	(United States) Atlas LV-3A Agena-B		(United States) Point Arguello LC-1-1		(United States) US Air Force	
5 August; 17:58:59	(United States) Samos-E6 4 (Samos-10/FTV-2404/AFP-201 PVP-854)	US Air Force	Low Earth	Optical imagery	6 August	Spacecraft failure
5 August; 17:58:59	Recovery failed.					
11 August; 08:30	(Soviet Union) Vostok-K		(Soviet Union) Baikonur Site 1/5		(Soviet Union) RVSN	
11 August; 08:30	(Soviet Union) Vostok 3	RVSN	Low Earth	Biological	15 August; 06:52	Successful
11 August; 08:30	Carried cosmonaut Andriyan Nikolayev					
12 August; 08:02:17	(Soviet Union) Vostok-K		(Soviet Union) Baikonur Site 1/5		(Soviet Union) RVSN	
12 August; 08:02:17	(Soviet Union) Vostok 4	RVSN	Low Earth	Biological	15 August; 06:59	Successful
12 August; 08:02:17	Carried cosmonaut Pavel Popovich, landed early after codeword requesting end of mission was accidentally used in conversation between crew and controllers.					
18 August; 15:00	(Soviet Union) Kosmos 63S1		(Soviet Union) Kapustin Yar Mayak-2		(Soviet Union)	
18 August; 15:00	(Soviet Union) Kosmos 8 (Sputnik 18/DS-K-8 #1)		Low Earth	Technology; Radar target	17 August 1963	Successful
23 August; 11:44	(United States) Scout X-2M		(United States) Point Arguello LC-D		(United States) US Air Force	
23 August; 11:44	(United States) DSAP-1 F2 (P-35 2/FTV-3502/DMSP-1A F2/AF-2)	US Air Force	Low Earth	Weather	In orbit	Successful
25 August; 02:18:45	(Soviet Union) Molniya		(Soviet Union) Baikonur Site 1/5		(Soviet Union) RVSN	
25 August; 02:18:45	(Soviet Union) Venera 2MV-1 №1 (Sputnik 19)	RVSN	Intended: Heliocentric; Achieved: Low Earth	Venus lander	28 August	Launch failure
25 August; 02:18:45	One of four upper stage ullage motors failed to ignite, resulting in loss of control.					
27 August; 06:59:14	(United States) Atlas LV-3A Agena-B		(United States) Cape Canaveral LC-12		(United States) US Air Force	
27 August; 06:59:14	(United States) Mariner 2	NASA	Heliocentric	Venus flyby	In orbit	Successful
29 August; 01:00	(United States) Thor DM-21 Agena-D		(United States) Vandenberg LC-75-1-2		(United States) US Air Force	
29 August; 01:00	(United States) FTV-1153 (KH-4 11/9044)	NRO/CIA	Low Earth	Optical imaging	10 September	Partial spacecraft failure
29 August; 01:00	(United States) SRV-596	NRO/CIA	Low Earth	Film return	2 September	Successful
29 August; 01:00	Attitude control system malfunctioned.					
← Jan; Feb; Mar; Apr; May; Jun; Jul; Aug; Sep; Oct; Nov; Dec →; === September ===
1 September; 02:18:45	(Soviet Union) Molniya		(Soviet Union) Baikonur Site 1/5		(Soviet Union) RVSN	
1 September; 02:18:45	(Soviet Union) Venera 2MV-1 №2 (Sputnik 20)	RVSN	Intended: Heliocentric; Achieved: Low Earth	Venus lander	6 September	Launch failure
1 September; 02:18:45	Valve failed to open, preventing upper stage restart.					
1 September; 20:39	(United States) Thor DM-21 Agena-B		(United States) Vandenberg LC-75-3-5		(United States) US Air Force	
1 September; 20:39	(United States) FTV-1132 (KH-5 6/9042)	NRO/CIA	Low Earth	Optical imaging	26 October	Successful
1 September; 20:39	(United States) SRV-600	NRO/CIA	Low Earth	Film return	September	Spacecraft failure
1 September; 20:39	Parachute torn from SRV during recovery resulting in loss of capsule.					
12 September; 00:59:13	(Soviet Union) Molniya		(Soviet Union) Baikonur Site 1/5		(Soviet Union) RVSN	
12 September; 00:59:13	(Soviet Union) Venera-2MV-2 №1 (Sputnik 21)	RVSN	Intended: Heliocentric; Achieved: Low Earth	Venus lander	14 September	Launch failure
12 September; 00:59:13	Vernier engine exploded due to failure of oxidiser valve to close.					
17 September; 23:46	(United States) Thor DM-21 Agena-B		(United States) Vandenberg LC-75-3-4		(United States) US Air Force	
17 September; 23:46	(United States) FTV-1133 (KH-4 9043)	NRO/CIA	Low Earth	Optical imaging	19 November	Partial spacecraft failure
17 September; 23:46	(United States) ERS-2 (TRS-1)	US Air Force	Low Earth	Technology	19 November	Spacecraft failure
17 September; 23:46	(United States) SRV-597	NRO/CIA	Low Earth	Film return	19 September	Successful
17 September; 23:46	Capping shutter malfunctioned, ERS-2 failed to separate from FTV-1133.					
18 September; 08:53:08	(United States) Thor DM-19 Delta	D012	(United States) Cape Canaveral LC-17A		(United States) US Air Force	
18 September; 08:53:08	(United States) Tiros-6 (Tiros-F2)	NASA	Low Earth	Weather	In orbit	Successful
18 September; 08:53:08	Final flight of Thor-Delta, last signal from satellite received on 21 October 1963.					
27 September; 09:39:51	(Soviet Union) Vostok-2		(Soviet Union) Baikonur Site 1/5		(Soviet Union)	
27 September; 09:39:51	(Soviet Union) Kosmos 9 (Zenit-2 №7)		Low Earth	Optical imagery	1 October	Successful
29 September; 06:05	(United States) Thor DM-21 Agena-B		(United States) Vandenberg LC-75-1-1		(United States) US Air Force	
29 September; 06:05	(Canada) Alouette 1	DRTE	Low Earth	Ionospheric	In orbit	Successful
29 September; 06:05	(United States) TAVE	NASA	Low Earth	Technology	In orbit	Successful
29 September; 06:05	Alouette 1 became the first Canadian satellite, TAVE intentionally remained attached to the carrier rocket's upper stage.					
29 September; 23:34:50	(United States) Thor DM-21 Agena-D		(United States) Vandenberg LC-75-1-2		(United States) US Air Force	
29 September; 23:34:50	(United States) FTV-1154 (KH-4 13/9045)	NRO/CIA	Low Earth	Optical imaging	8 October	Partial spacecraft failure
29 September; 23:34:50	(United States) SRV-598	NRO/CIA	Low Earth	Film return	October	Successful
29 September; 23:34:50	Attitude control system malfunctioned.					
← Jan; Feb; Mar; Apr; May; Jun; Jul; Aug; Sep; Oct; Nov; Dec →
For flights after 30 September, see 1962 in spaceflight (September-December)

== Suborbital launches ==
- ← Jan
- Feb
- Mar
- Apr
- May
- Jun
- Jul
- Aug
- Sep
- Oct
- Nov
- Dec →

Date and time (UTC)	Rocket	Flight number	Launch site		LSP	
Date and time (UTC)	Payload (⚀ = CubeSat)	Operator	Orbit	Function	Decay (UTC)	Outcome
Date and time (UTC)	Remarks					
=== July ===
1 July	(United States) Nike-Cajun		(United States) Johnston		(United States) US Air Force	
1 July		AFCRL	Suborbital	Aeronomy	1 July	Successful
1 July	Apogee: 100 kilometres (62 mi)					
2 July	(Soviet Union) R-7A Semyorka		(Soviet Union) Baikonur		(Soviet Union) RVSN	
2 July		RVSN	Suborbital	Missile test	2 July	Successful
2 July	Apogee: 1,350 kilometres (840 mi)					
4 July	(Soviet Union) R-12 Dvina		(Soviet Union) Kapustin Yar		(Soviet Union) MVS	
4 July		MVS	Suborbital	Missile test	4 July	Successful
4 July	Apogee: 402 kilometres (250 mi)					
4 July			(Soviet Union) Kapustin Yar		(Soviet Union) MVS	
4 July		MVS	Suborbital	Missile test	4 July	Successful
4 July	Apogee: 200 kilometres (120 mi)					
5 July; 03:46	(United Kingdom) Skylark-5		(Australia) Woomera LA-2		(United Kingdom) RAE	
5 July; 03:46		UCL	Suborbital	Aeronomy	5 July	Successful
5 July; 03:46	Apogee: 111 kilometres (69 mi)					
5 July			(Soviet Union) Kapustin Yar		(Soviet Union) MVS	
5 July		MVS	Suborbital	Missile test	5 July	Successful
5 July	Apogee: 200 kilometres (120 mi)					
5 July			(Soviet Union) Kapustin Yar		(Soviet Union) MVS	
5 July		MVS	Suborbital	Missile test	5 July	Successful
5 July	Apogee: 200 kilometres (120 mi)					
5 July			(Soviet Union) Kapustin Yar		(Soviet Union) MVS	
5 July		MVS	Suborbital	Missile test	5 July	Successful
5 July	Apogee: 200 kilometres (120 mi)					
5 July			(Soviet Union) Kapustin Yar		(Soviet Union) MVS	
5 July		MVS	Suborbital	Missile test	5 July	Successful
5 July	Apogee: 200 kilometres (120 mi)					
6 July	(France) Berenice		(France) CERES		(France) ONERA	
6 July		ONERA	Suborbital	REV Test	6 July	Successful
6 July	Apogee: 270 kilometres (170 mi)					
8 July	(United States) Nike-Cajun		(United States) Johnston		(United States) US Air Force	
8 July		AFCRL	Suborbital	Aeronomy	8 July	Successful
8 July	Apogee: 100 kilometres (62 mi)					
9 July; 08:46:28	(United States) Thor DSV-2E		(United States) Johnston LE-1		(United States) US Air Force	
9 July; 08:46:28		US Air Force	Suborbital	Nuclear test	9 July	Successful
9 July; 08:46:28	Apogee: 400 kilometres (250 mi)					
9 July; 08:51:39	(United States) (France) Strypi-Antares		(United States) Johnston		(United States) DASA	
9 July; 08:51:39		US Air Force	Suborbital	Test flight	9 July	Successful
9 July; 08:51:39	Apogee: 820 kilometres (510 mi)					
9 July; 08:52:27	(United States) (France) Strypi-Antares		(United States) Johnston		(United States) DASA	
9 July; 08:52:27		US Air Force	Suborbital	Test flight	9 July	Successful
9 July; 08:52:27	Apogee: 1,100 kilometres (680 mi)					
9 July; 08:55:43	(United States) (France) Strypi-Antares		(United States) Johnston		(United States) DASA	
9 July; 08:55:43		US Air Force	Suborbital	Test flight	9 July	Successful
9 July; 08:55:43	Apogee: 1,200 kilometres (750 mi)					
9 July; 08:57:29	(United States) (France) Strypi-Antares		(United States) Johnston		(United States) DASA	
9 July; 08:57:29		US Air Force	Suborbital	Test flight	9 July	Successful
9 July; 08:57:29	Apogee: 1,030 kilometres (640 mi)					
9 July; 08:57:49	(United States) (France) Strypi-Antares		(United States) Johnston		(United States) DASA	
9 July; 08:57:49		US Air Force	Suborbital	Test flight	9 July	Successful
9 July; 08:57:49	Apogee: 900 kilometres (560 mi)					
9 July; 08:59	(United States) Honest John-Nike		(United States) Johnston		(United States) US Air Force	
9 July; 08:59		US Air Force	Suborbital	Ionospheric	9 July	Launch failure
9 July; 09:08	(United States) Honest John-Nike		(United States) Johnston		(United States) US Air Force	
9 July; 09:08		AFCRL	Suborbital	Ionospheric	9 July	Successful
9 July; 09:08	Apogee: 100 kilometres (62 mi)					
9 July	(United States) Javelin		(United States) Johnston		(United States) US Air Force	
9 July		US Air Force	Suborbital	Ionospheric	9 July	Successful
9 July	Apogee: 500 kilometres (310 mi)					
9 July	(United States) Javelin		(United States) Johnston		(United States) US Air Force	
9 July		US Air Force	Suborbital	Ionospheric	9 July	Successful
9 July	Apogee: 500 kilometres (310 mi)					
9 July	(United States) Journeyman		(United States) Point Arguello LC-A		(United States) AEC	
9 July		AEC	Suborbital	Magnetospheric	9 July	
9 July	Apogee: 1,500 kilometres (930 mi)					
9 July	(United States) Astrobee-1500		(United States) Point Arguello LC-B		(United States) Sandia	
9 July		AEC	Suborbital	Magnetospheric	9 July	Launch failure
9 July	Apogee: 1 kilometre (0.62 mi)					
9 July	(United States) Nike-Cajun		(United States) Johnston		(United States) US Air Force	
9 July		AFCRL	Suborbital	Aeronomy	9 July	Successful
9 July	Apogee: 100 kilometres (62 mi)					
9 July	(United States) Nike-Cajun		(United States) Johnston		(United States) US Air Force	
9 July		AFCRL	Suborbital	Aeronomy	9 July	Successful
9 July	Apogee: 100 kilometres (62 mi)					
9 July	(United States) Nike-Cajun		(United States) Johnston		(United States) US Air Force	
9 July		US Air Force	Suborbital	Aeronomy	9 July	Successful
9 July	Apogee: 100 kilometres (62 mi)					
9 July	(United States) Nike-Cajun		(United States) Johnston		(United States) US Air Force	
9 July		US Air Force	Suborbital	Aeronomy	9 July	Successful
9 July	Apogee: 100 kilometres (62 mi)					
10 July; 15:00	(United States) Aerobee-150 (Hi)		(United States) White Sands LC-35		(United States) NASA	
10 July; 15:00		NASA	Suborbital	Technology	10 July	Successful
10 July; 15:00	Apogee: 200 kilometres (120 mi)					
11 July; 18:51:54	(United States) LGM-25C Titan II		(United States) Cape Canaveral LC-15		(United States) US Air Force	
11 July; 18:51:54		US Air Force	Suborbital	Missile test	11 July	Successful
11 July; 18:51:54	Apogee: 1,300 kilometres (810 mi)					
12 July; 16:57:57	(United States) SM-65D Atlas		(United States) Vandenberg LC-576B-2		(United States) Strategic Air Command	
12 July; 16:57:57		Strategic Air Command	Suborbital	Target	12 July	Successful
12 July; 16:57:57	Apogee: 1,800 kilometres (1,100 mi)					
12 July; 18:31:57	(United States) UGM-27 Polaris A2		(United States) USS John Marshall, ETR		(United States) US Navy	
12 July; 18:31:57		US Navy	Suborbital	Missile test	12 July	Successful
12 July; 18:31:57	Apogee: 1,000 kilometres (620 mi)					
12 July; 20:05:13	(United States) UGM-27 Polaris A2		(United States) USS John Marshall, ETR		(United States) US Navy	
12 July; 20:05:13		US Navy	Suborbital	Missile test	12 July	Successful
12 July; 20:05:13	Apogee: 1,000 kilometres (620 mi)					
13 July; 03:03:10	(United States) LGM-30A Minuteman IA		(United States) Cape Canaveral LC-31B		(United States) US Air Force	
13 July; 03:03:10		US Air Force	Suborbital	Missile test	13 July	Launch failure
13 July; 03:03:10	Apogee: 1 kilometre (0.62 mi)					
13 July; 21:11:33	(United States) SM-65E Atlas		(United States) Vandenberg OSTF-1		(United States) US Air Force	
13 July; 21:11:33		US Air Force	Suborbital	Missile test	13 July	Launch failure
13 July; 21:11:33	Apogee: 1,800 kilometres (1,100 mi)					
13 July	(Soviet Union) R-16U		(Soviet Union) Baikonur Site 60/8		(Soviet Union) RVSN	
13 July		RVSN	Suborbital	Missile test	13 July	Launch failure
16 July	(United States) Nike-Zeus 3		(United States) White Sands LC-38		(United States) US Army	
16 July		US Army	Suborbital	Missile test	16 July	Successful
16 July	Apogee: 200 kilometres (120 mi)					
18 July; 09:30:12	(United States) Thor DSV-2D		(United States) Cape Canaveral LC-17A		(United States) US Air Force	
18 July; 09:30:12		NASA	Suborbital	Test flight	18 July	Successful
18 July; 09:30:12	Apogee: 1,484 kilometres (922 mi)					
19 July; 08:40	(United States) Nike-Cajun		(United States) Johnston		(United States) US Air Force	
19 July; 08:40		AFCRL	Suborbital	Aeronomy	19 July	Successful
19 July; 08:40	Apogee: 100 kilometres (62 mi)					
19 July; 11:05:27	(United States) SM-65D Atlas		(United States) Vandenberg LC-576B-1		(United States) Strategic Air Command	
19 July; 11:05:27		Strategic Air Command	Suborbital	Missile test	19 July	Successful
19 July; 11:05:27	Apogee: 1,800 kilometres (1,100 mi)					
19 July; 11:35	(United States) Nike-Zeus 3		(United States) Kwajalein		(United States) US Army	
19 July; 11:35		US Army	Suborbital	Missile test	19 July	Successful
19 July; 11:35	Apogee: 200 kilometres (120 mi)					
21 July; 20:49:54	(United States) UGM-27 Polaris A2		(United States) USS John Marshall, ETR		(United States) US Navy	
21 July; 20:49:54		US Navy	Suborbital	Missile test	21 July	Successful
21 July; 20:49:54	Apogee: 1,000 kilometres (620 mi)					
21 July; 22:19:15	(United States) UGM-27 Polaris A2		(United States) USS John Marshall, ETR		(United States) US Navy	
21 July; 22:19:15		US Navy	Suborbital	Missile test	21 July	Successful
21 July; 22:19:15	Apogee: 1,000 kilometres (620 mi)					
21 July; 23:49:14	(United States) UGM-27 Polaris A2		(United States) USS John Marshall, ETR		(United States) US Navy	
21 July; 23:49:14		US Navy	Suborbital	Missile test	21 July	Successful
21 July; 23:49:14	Apogee: 1,000 kilometres (620 mi)					
21 July	(Soviet Union) R-16U		(Soviet Union) Baikonur		(Soviet Union) RVSN	
21 July		RVSN	Suborbital	Missile test	21 July	Successful
21 July	Apogee: 1,210 kilometres (750 mi)					
21 July	(Soviet Union) R-9 Desna		(Soviet Union) Baikonur		(Soviet Union) RVSN	
21 July		RVSN	Suborbital	Missile test	21 July	Successful
21 July	Apogee: 1,160 kilometres (720 mi)					
23 July	(United States) Nike-Cajun		(United States) Johnston		(United States) US Air Force	
23 July		AFCRL	Suborbital	Aeronomy	23 July	Successful
23 July	Apogee: 100 kilometres (62 mi)					
23 July	(United States) Javelin		(United States) Johnston		(United States) US Air Force	
23 July		US Air Force	Suborbital	Aeronomy	23 July	Successful
23 July	Apogee: 500 kilometres (310 mi)					
24 July; 12:09:00	(United States) Aerobee-150A		(United States) Eglin		(United States) US Air Force	
24 July; 12:09:00		US Air Force	Suborbital	Aeronomy	24 July	
24 July; 12:09:00	Apogee: 100 kilometres (62 mi)					
24 July; 17:29:12	(United States) Blue Scout Junior SLV-1C		(United States) Point Arguello LC-A		(United States) US Air Force	
24 July; 17:29:12		Strategic Air Command	Suborbital	Communications	24 July	Successful
24 July; 17:29:12	Apogee: 1,000 kilometres (620 mi)					
24 July; 21:41	(United States) Aerobee-150 (Hi)		(United States) Wallops Island		(United States) NASA	
24 July; 21:41		UCO	Suborbital	Solar	24 July	Successful
24 July; 21:41	Apogee: 208 kilometres (129 mi)					
24 July	(Soviet Union) R-9 Desna		(Soviet Union) Baikonur		(Soviet Union) RVSN	
24 July		RVSN	Suborbital	Missile test	24 July	Successful
24 July	Apogee: 1,160 kilometres (720 mi)					
25 July; 15:41	(United States) NOTS-EV-2 Caleb		(United States) F4H Phantom II, Point Arguello		(United States) NOTS	
25 July; 15:41		NOTS/NRL	Suborbital	Aeronomy	25 July	Successful
25 July; 15:41	Apogee: 1,166 kilometres (725 mi)					
25 July; 16:17:20	(United States) LGM-25C Titan II		(United States) Cape Canaveral Cape Canaveral Air Force Station Launch Complex 16		(United States) US Air Force	
25 July; 16:17:20		US Air Force	Suborbital	Missile test	25 July	Successful
25 July; 16:17:20	Apogee: 1,300 kilometres (810 mi)					
25 July			(Soviet Union) Kapustin Yar		(Soviet Union) MVS	
25 July		MVS	Suborbital	Missile test	25 July	Successful
25 July	Apogee: 200 kilometres (120 mi)					
25 July			(Soviet Union) Kapustin Yar		(Soviet Union) MVS	
25 July		MVS	Suborbital	Missile test	25 July	Successful
25 July	Apogee: 200 kilometres (120 mi)					
26 July; 09:13:53	(United States) Thor DSV-2E		(United States) Johnston LE-1		(United States) US Air Force	
26 July; 09:13:53	(United States) BLUEGILL PRIME	US Air Force	Suborbital	Nuclear test	26 July	Launch failure
26 July; 17:50:02	(United States) UGM-27 Polaris A2		(United States) Cape Canaveral LC-25A		(United States) US Navy	
26 July; 17:50:02		US Navy	Suborbital	Missile test	26 July	Successful
26 July; 17:50:02	Apogee: 1,000 kilometres (620 mi)					
27 July	(United States) UGM-27 Polaris A1		(United States) USS George Washington, ETR		(United States) US Navy	
27 July		US Navy	Suborbital	Missile test	27 July	Successful
27 July	Apogee: 500 kilometres (310 mi)					
27 July	(United States) UGM-27 Polaris A1		(United States) USS George Washington, ETR		(United States) US Navy	
27 July		US Navy	Suborbital	Missile test	27 July	Successful
27 July	Apogee: 500 kilometres (310 mi)					
27 July	(United States) UGM-27 Polaris A1		(United States) USS George Washington, ETR		(United States) US Navy	
27 July		US Navy	Suborbital	Missile test	27 July	Successful
27 July	Apogee: 500 kilometres (310 mi)					
27 July	(United States) UGM-27 Polaris A1		(United States) USS George Washington, ETR		(United States) US Navy	
27 July		US Navy	Suborbital	Missile test	27 July	Successful
27 July	Apogee: 500 kilometres (310 mi)					
27 July	(Soviet Union) R-12 Dvina		(Soviet Union) Kapustin Yar		(Soviet Union) MVS	
27 July		MVS	Suborbital	Missile test	27 July	Successful
27 July	Apogee: 402 kilometres (250 mi)					
28 July; 02:50	(United States) Trailblazer 1		(United States) Wallops Island		(United States) NASA	
28 July; 02:50		NASA	Suborbital	REV Test	28 July	Successful
28 July; 02:50	Apogee: 280 kilometres (170 mi)					
28 July	(Soviet Union) R-12 Dvina		(Soviet Union) Kapustin Yar		(Soviet Union) MVS	
28 July		MVS	Suborbital	Missile test	28 July	Launch failure
29 July	(Soviet Union) R-9 Desna		(Soviet Union) Baikonur		(Soviet Union) RVSN	
29 July		RVSN	Suborbital	Missile test	29 July	Launch failure
30 July	(Soviet Union) R-12 Dvina		(Soviet Union) Kapustin Yar		(Soviet Union) MVS	
30 July		MVS	Suborbital	Missile test	30 July	Successful
30 July	Apogee: 402 kilometres (250 mi)					
31 July	(Soviet Union) R-16U		(Soviet Union) Baikonur Site 60/8		(Soviet Union) RVSN	
31 July		RVSN	Suborbital	Missile test	31 July	Successful
31 July	Apogee: 1,210 kilometres (750 mi)					
July	(Soviet Union) R-14 Chusovaya		(Soviet Union) Kapustin Yar		(Soviet Union) RVSN	
July		RVSN	Suborbital	Missile test	July	Successful
July	Apogee: 675 kilometres (419 mi)					
July	(Soviet Union) R-14 Chusovaya		(Soviet Union) Kapustin Yar		(Soviet Union) RVSN	
July		RVSN	Suborbital	Missile test	July	Successful
July	Apogee: 675 kilometres (419 mi)					
July	(Soviet Union) R-14 Chusovaya		(Soviet Union) Kapustin Yar		(Soviet Union) RVSN	
July		RVSN	Suborbital	Missile test	July	Successful
July	Apogee: 675 kilometres (419 mi)					
=== August ===
1 August; 18:40:40	(United States) PGM-19 Jupiter		(United States) Cape Canaveral LC-26A		(United States) US Army	
1 August; 18:40:40		US Army	Suborbital	Missile test	1 August	Successful
1 August; 18:40:40	Apogee: 500 kilometres (310 mi)					
1 August; 21:07:10	(United States) SM-65F Atlas		(United States) Vandenberg LC-576E		(United States) US Air Force	
1 August; 21:07:10		US Air Force	Suborbital	Missile test	1 August	Successful
1 August; 21:07:10	Apogee: 1,400 kilometres (870 mi)					
3 August; 17:46	(United States) Exos		(United States) Eglin		(United States) US Air Force	
3 August; 17:46		AFCRL	Suborbital	Ionospheric	3 August	Successful
3 August; 17:46	Apogee: 365 kilometres (227 mi)					
4 August	(Soviet Union) R-14 Chusovaya		(Soviet Union) Kapustin Yar		(Soviet Union) RVSN	
4 August		RVSN	Suborbital	Missile test	4 August	Successful
4 August	Apogee: 675 kilometres (419 mi)					
5 August	(United States) Kiva-Hopi		(United States) Point Arguello LC-B		(United States) US Air Force	
5 August		US Air Force	Suborbital	Aeronomy	5 August	
5 August	Apogee: 300 kilometres (190 mi)					
7 August; 00:47:08	(United States) Nike-Cajun		(Sweden) Kronogard		(United States) AFCRL	
7 August; 00:47:08		AFCRL	Suborbital	Aeronomy	7 August	Successful
7 August; 00:47:08	Apogee: 105 kilometres (65 mi)					
7 August; 19:20:05	(United States) UGM-27 Polaris A3		(United States) Cape Canaveral LC-29A		(United States) US Navy	
7 August; 19:20:05		US Navy	Suborbital	Missile test	7 August	Successful
7 August; 19:20:05	Apogee: 1,000 kilometres (620 mi)					
8 August; 16:55	(United States) Aerobee-150 (Hi)		(United States) Wallops Island		(United States) NASA	
8 August; 16:55		NASA	Suborbital	Test flight	8 August	Successful
8 August; 16:55	Apogee: 149 kilometres (93 mi)					
8 August	(Soviet Union) R-12 Dvina		(Soviet Union) Kapustin Yar		(Soviet Union) MVS	
8 August		MVS	Suborbital	Missile test	8 August	Successful
8 August	Apogee: 402 kilometres (250 mi)					
8 August	(Soviet Union) R-16U		(Soviet Union) Baikonur		(Soviet Union) RVSN	
8 August		RVSN	Suborbital	Missile test	8 August	Successful
8 August	Apogee: 1,210 kilometres (750 mi)					
9 August; 15:05:02	(United States) LGM-30A Minuteman IA		(United States) Cape Canaveral LC-32B		(United States) US Air Force	
9 August; 15:05:02		US Air Force	Suborbital	Missile test	9 August	Launch failure
9 August; 15:05:02	Apogee: 1 kilometre (0.62 mi)					
9 August; 22:51:08	(United States) SM-65D Atlas		(United States) Vandenberg LC-576B-3		(United States) Strategic Air Command	
9 August; 22:51:08		Strategic Air Command	Suborbital	Missile test	9 August	Successful
9 August; 22:51:08	Apogee: 1,800 kilometres (1,100 mi)					
9 August; 23:05:19	(United States) SM-65D Atlas		(United States) Vandenberg LC-576B-2		(United States) Strategic Air Command	
9 August; 23:05:19		Strategic Air Command	Suborbital	Missile test	9 August	Successful
9 August; 23:05:19	Apogee: 1,800 kilometres (1,100 mi)					
10 August; 21:11:21	(United States) SM-65F Atlas		(United States) Vandenberg OSTF-2		(United States) US Air Force	
10 August; 21:11:21		US Air Force	Suborbital	Missile test	10 August	Launch failure
10 August; 21:11:21	Apogee: 10 kilometres (6.2 mi)					
10 August; 21:27:00	(United States) UGM-27 Polaris A2		(United States) Cape Canaveral LC-25A		(United States) US Navy	
10 August; 21:27:00		US Navy	Suborbital	Missile test	10 August	Successful
10 August; 21:27:00	Apogee: 1,000 kilometres (620 mi)					
10 August	(Soviet Union) R-12 Dvina		(Soviet Union) Kapustin Yar		(Soviet Union) MVS	
10 August		MVS	Suborbital	Missile test	10 August	Successful
10 August	Apogee: 402 kilometres (250 mi)					
10 August			(Soviet Union) Kapustin Yar		(Soviet Union) MVS	
10 August		MVS	Suborbital	Missile test	10 August	Successful
10 August	Apogee: 200 kilometres (120 mi)					
10 August			(Soviet Union) Kapustin Yar		(Soviet Union) MVS	
10 August		MVS	Suborbital	Missile test	10 August	Successful
10 August	Apogee: 200 kilometres (120 mi)					
10 August			(Soviet Union) Kapustin Yar		(Soviet Union) MVS	
10 August		MVS	Suborbital	Missile test	10 August	Successful
10 August	Apogee: 200 kilometres (120 mi)					
10 August			(Soviet Union) Kapustin Yar		(Soviet Union) MVS	
10 August		MVS	Suborbital	Missile test	10 August	Successful
10 August	Apogee: 200 kilometres (120 mi)					
11 August; 01:48:11	(United States) Nike-Cajun		(Sweden) Kronogard		(United States) AFCRL	
11 August; 01:48:11		AFCRL	Suborbital	Aeronomy	11 August	Successful
11 August; 01:48:11	Apogee: 105 kilometres (65 mi)					
13 August; 22:00	(United States) SM-65F Atlas		(United States) Cape Canaveral LC-11		(United States) US Air Force	
13 August; 22:00		US Air Force	Suborbital	Test flight	13 August	Successful
13 August; 22:00	Apogee: 1,400 kilometres (870 mi)					
14 August; 15:20	(United Kingdom) Skylark-2		(Australia) Woomera LA-2		(United Kingdom) RAE	
14 August; 15:20		Sheffield; UCL	Suborbital	Ionospheric	14 August	Successful
14 August; 15:20	Apogee: 111 kilometres (69 mi)					
15 August	(Soviet Union) R-12 Dvina		(Soviet Union) Kapustin Yar		(Soviet Union) MVS	
15 August		MVS	Suborbital	Missile test	15 August	Successful
15 August	Apogee: 402 kilometres (250 mi)					
17 August; 16:34:10	(United States) UGM-27 Polaris A2		(United States) Cape Canaveral LC-25A		(United States) US Navy	
17 August; 16:34:10		US Navy	Suborbital	Missile test	17 August	Launch failure
17 August; 16:34:10	Apogee: 1 kilometre (0.62 mi)					
18 August; 07:09	(United States) Nike-Cajun		(Norway) Andøya		(Norway) NTNF	
18 August; 07:09		ILC	Suborbital	Ionospheric	18 August	Successful
18 August; 07:09	Apogee: 100 kilometres (62 mi)					
19 August; 00:57:39	(United States) Nike-Cajun		(Sweden) Kronogard		(United States) AFCRL	
19 August; 00:57:39		AFCRL	Suborbital	Aeronomy	19 August	Successful
19 August; 00:57:39	Apogee: 109 kilometres (68 mi)					
21 August			(Soviet Union) Kapustin Yar		(Soviet Union) MVS	
21 August		MVS	Suborbital	Missile test	21 August	Successful
21 August	Apogee: 200 kilometres (120 mi)					
21 August			(Soviet Union) Kapustin Yar		(Soviet Union) MVS	
21 August		MVS	Suborbital	Missile test	21 August	Successful
21 August	Apogee: 200 kilometres (120 mi)					
21 August			(Soviet Union) Kapustin Yar		(Soviet Union) MVS	
21 August		MVS	Suborbital	Missile test	21 August	Successful
21 August	Apogee: 200 kilometres (120 mi)					
21 August			(Soviet Union) Kapustin Yar		(Soviet Union) MVS	
21 August		MVS	Suborbital	Missile test	21 August	Successful
21 August	Apogee: 200 kilometres (120 mi)					
21 August			(Soviet Union) Kapustin Yar		(Soviet Union) MVS	
21 August		MVS	Suborbital	Missile test	21 August	Successful
21 August	Apogee: 200 kilometres (120 mi)					
21 August			(Soviet Union) Kapustin Yar		(Soviet Union) MVS	
21 August		MVS	Suborbital	Missile test	21 August	Successful
21 August	Apogee: 200 kilometres (120 mi)					
22 August; 01:30:00	(United States) MGM-31 Pershing I		(United States) Cape Canaveral LC-30A		(United States) US Army	
22 August; 01:30:00		US Army	Suborbital	Missile test	22 August	Successful
22 August; 01:30:00	Apogee: 250 kilometres (160 mi)					
22 August; 15:30	(United States) Aerobee-150 (Hi)		(United States) White Sands LC-35		(United States) NRL	
22 August; 15:30		NRL	Suborbital	Solar	22 August	Successful
22 August; 15:30	Apogee: 234 kilometres (145 mi)					
23 August; 07:15	(Japan) Kappa-8L		(Japan) Kagoshima		(Japan) ISAS	
23 August; 07:15		ISAS	Suborbital	Test flight	23 August	Successful
23 August; 07:15	Apogee: 173 kilometres (107 mi)					
23 August; 17:10	(United States) Nike-Apache		(United States) Wallops Island		(United States) NASA	
23 August; 17:10		NASA	Suborbital	Aeronomy	23 August	Successful
23 August; 17:10	Apogee: 129 kilometres (80 mi)					
23 August			(Soviet Union) Kapustin Yar		(Soviet Union) MVS	
23 August		MVS	Suborbital	Missile test	23 August	Successful
23 August	Apogee: 200 kilometres (120 mi)					
24 August; 11:38	(United Kingdom) Black Knight 301		(Australia) Woomera LA-5		(United Kingdom) RAE	
24 August; 11:38		UCL	Suborbital	REV test Ionospheric	24 August	Successful
24 August; 11:38	Apogee: 573 kilometres (356 mi)					
25 August	(United States) Nike-Zeus 3		(United States) Point Mugu		(United States) US Army	
25 August		US Army	Suborbital	Missile test	25 August	Launch failure
25 August	Apogee: 100 kilometres (62 mi)					
27 August; 09:08	(United States) HAD		(Australia) Woomera LA-2		(Australia) WRE	
27 August; 09:08		WRE	Suborbital	Aeronomy	27 August	Successful
27 August; 09:08	Apogee: 114 kilometres (71 mi)					
27 August; 15:02:03	(United States) UGM-27 Polaris A2		(United States) Cape Canaveral LC-25A		(United States) US Navy	
27 August; 15:02:03		US Navy	Suborbital	Missile test	27 August	Successful
27 August; 15:02:03	Apogee: 1,000 kilometres (620 mi)					
28 August; 19:34	(United States) Nike-Cajun		(United States) Eglin		(United States) US Air Force	
28 August; 19:34		US Air Force	Suborbital	Ionospheric	28 August	Successful
28 August; 19:34	Apogee: 148 kilometres (92 mi)					
28 August	(United States) Nike-Zeus 3		(United States) White Sands LC-38		(United States) US Army	
28 August		US Army	Suborbital	Missile test	28 August	Successful
28 August	Apogee: 200 kilometres (120 mi)					
29 August; 01:01	(United Kingdom) Skylark-2		(Australia) Woomera LA-2		(United Kingdom) RAE	
29 August; 01:01		RAE/WRE	Suborbital	Test flight	29 August	Successful
29 August; 01:01	Apogee: 109 kilometres (68 mi)					
29 August; 19:00	(United States) Nike-Cajun		(United States) Eglin		(United States) US Air Force	
29 August; 19:00		US Air Force	Suborbital	Ionospheric	29 August	Successful
29 August; 19:00	Apogee: 100 kilometres (62 mi)					
31 August; 00:56:07	(United States) Nike-Cajun		(Sweden) Kronogard		(United States) AFCRL	
31 August; 00:56:07		AFCRL	Suborbital	Aeronomy	31 August	Successful
31 August; 00:56:07	Apogee: 111 kilometres (69 mi)					
31 August; 16:25	(United States) Scout X-3A		(United States) Wallops Island LA-3		(United States) NASA	
31 August; 16:25		NASA	Suborbital	REV Test	31 August	Launch failure
31 August; 16:25	Apogee: 217 kilometres (135 mi), third stage ignition occurred late					
=== September ===
4 September	(Soviet Union) R-12 Dvina		(Soviet Union) Kapustin Yar		(Soviet Union) MVS	
4 September		MVS	Suborbital	Missile test	4 September	Successful
4 September	Apogee: 402 kilometres (250 mi)					
4 September			(Soviet Union) Kapustin Yar		(Soviet Union) MVS	
4 September		MVS	Suborbital	Missile test	4 September	Successful
4 September	Apogee: 200 kilometres (120 mi)					
4 September			(Soviet Union) Kapustin Yar		(Soviet Union) MVS	
4 September		MVS	Suborbital	Missile test	4 September	Successful
4 September	Apogee: 200 kilometres (120 mi)					
4 September			(Soviet Union) Kapustin Yar		(Soviet Union) MVS	
4 September		MVS	Suborbital	Missile test	4 September	Successful
4 September	Apogee: 200 kilometres (120 mi)					
4 September			(Soviet Union) Kapustin Yar		(Soviet Union) MVS	
4 September		MVS	Suborbital	Missile test	4 September	Successful
4 September	Apogee: 200 kilometres (120 mi)					
4 September			(Soviet Union) Kapustin Yar		(Soviet Union) MVS	
4 September		MVS	Suborbital	Missile test	4 September	Successful
4 September	Apogee: 200 kilometres (120 mi)					
6 September; 16:00	(United States) UGM-27 Polaris A3		(United States) Cape Canaveral LC-29A		(United States) US Navy	
6 September; 16:00		US Navy	Suborbital	Missile test	6 September	Successful
6 September; 16:00	Apogee: 1,000 kilometres (620 mi)					
7 September			(Soviet Union) Kapustin Yar		(Soviet Union) MVS	
7 September		MVS	Suborbital	Missile test	7 September	Successful
7 September	Apogee: 200 kilometres (120 mi)					
7 September			(Soviet Union) Kapustin Yar		(Soviet Union) MVS	
7 September		MVS	Suborbital	Missile test	7 September	Successful
7 September	Apogee: 200 kilometres (120 mi)					
11 September; 13:30	(United Kingdom) Skylark-2C		(Australia) Woomera LA-2		(United Kingdom) RAE	
11 September; 13:30		UCL	Suborbital	Ionospheric	11 September	Successful
11 September; 13:30	Apogee: 232 kilometres (144 mi)					
11 September; 23:24	(United States) Aerobee-150 (Hi)		(United States) White Sands LC-35		(United States) US Air Force	
11 September; 23:24		AFCRL	Suborbital	Aeronomy	11 September	Successful
11 September; 23:24	Apogee: 306 kilometres (190 mi)					
12 September; 15:50:00	(United States) LGM-25C Titan II		(United States) Cape Canaveral LC-15		(United States) US Air Force	
12 September; 15:50:00		US Air Force	Suborbital	Missile test	12 September	Successful
12 September; 15:50:00	Apogee: 1,300 kilometres (810 mi)					
14 September; 08:09:06	(United States) UGM-27 Polaris A1		(United States) USNS Observation Island, ETR		(United States) US Navy	
14 September; 08:09:06		US Navy	Suborbital	Missile test	14 September	Successful
14 September; 08:09:06	Apogee: 500 kilometres (310 mi)					
15 September; 20:37:10	(United States) UGM-27 Polaris A1		(United States) USNS Observation Island, ETR		(United States) US Navy	
15 September; 20:37:10		US Navy	Suborbital	Missile test	15 September	Successful
15 September; 20:37:10	Apogee: 500 kilometres (310 mi)					
15 September	(Soviet Union) R-12 Dvina		(Soviet Union) Kapustin Yar		(Soviet Union) MVS	
15 September		MVS	Suborbital	Missile test	15 September	Successful
15 September	Apogee: 402 kilometres (250 mi)					
19 September; 03:06:22	(United States) LGM-30A Minuteman IA		(United States) Cape Canaveral LC-31B		(United States) US Air Force	
19 September; 03:06:22		US Air Force	Suborbital	Missile test	19 September	Successful
19 September; 03:06:22	Apogee: 1,300 kilometres (810 mi)					
19 September; 19:30	(United States) SM-65F Atlas		(United States) Cape Canaveral LC-11		(United States) US Air Force	
19 September; 19:30		US Air Force	Suborbital	Test flight	19 September	Successful
19 September; 19:30	Apogee: 1,400 kilometres (870 mi)					
19 September	(Soviet Union) R-12 Dvina		(Soviet Union) Kapustin Yar		(Soviet Union) MVS	
19 September		MVS	Suborbital	Missile test	19 September	Successful
19 September	Apogee: 402 kilometres (250 mi)					
20 September; 03:45:41	(United States) LGM-30A Minuteman IA		(United States) Cape Canaveral LC-31B		(United States) US Air Force	
20 September; 03:45:41		US Air Force	Suborbital	Missile test	20 September	Successful
20 September; 03:45:41	Apogee: 1,300 kilometres (810 mi)					
20 September; 04:21	(United Kingdom) Skylark-2		(Australia) Woomera LA-2		(United Kingdom) RAE	
20 September; 04:21		Sheffield	Suborbital	Ionospheric	20 September	Successful
20 September; 04:21	Apogee: 113 kilometres (70 mi)					
20 September	(Soviet Union) R-12 Dvina		(Soviet Union) Kapustin Yar		(Soviet Union) MVS	
20 September		MVS	Suborbital	Missile test	20 September	Successful
20 September	Apogee: 402 kilometres (250 mi)					
20 September	(Soviet Union) R-12 Dvina		(Soviet Union) Kapustin Yar		(Soviet Union) MVS	
20 September		MVS	Suborbital	Missile test	20 September	Launch failure
21 September	(United States) RAM-B		(United States) Wallops Island		(United States) NASA	
21 September		NASA	Suborbital	REV Test	21 September	Launch failure
21 September	Apogee: 20 kilometres (12 mi)					
22 September; 02:24	(United States) Aerobee-150A		(United States) Wallops Island		(United States) NASA	
22 September; 02:24		NASA	Suborbital	UV Astronomy	22 September	Successful
22 September; 02:24	Apogee: 187 kilometres (116 mi)					
22 September; 06:45	(United States) Journeyman		(United States) Wallops Island		(United States) NASA	
22 September; 06:45		Michigan	Suborbital	Radio astronomy	22 September	Successful
22 September; 06:45	Apogee: 1,691 kilometres (1,051 mi)					
27 September; 02:14:56	(United States) MGM-31 Pershing I		(United States) Cape Canaveral LC-30		(United States) US Army	
27 September; 02:14:56		US Army	Suborbital	Missile test	27 September	Successful
27 September; 02:14:56	Apogee: 250 kilometres (160 mi)					
27 September; 18:00	(United States) Aerobee-150 (Hi)		(United States) White Sands LC-35		(United States) US Air Force	
27 September; 18:00		US Air Force	Suborbital	Ionospheric	27 September	Successful
27 September; 18:00	Apogee: 260 kilometres (160 mi)					
27 September	(Soviet Union) R-16U		(Soviet Union) Baikonur		(Soviet Union) RVSN	
27 September		RVSN	Suborbital	Missile test	27 September	Successful
27 September	Apogee: 1,210 kilometres (750 mi)					
27 September	(United States) Nike-Zeus 3		(United States) White Sands LC-38		(United States) US Army	
27 September		US Army	Suborbital	Missile test	27 September	Successful
27 September	Apogee: 200 kilometres (120 mi)					
27 September			(Soviet Union) Kapustin Yar		(Soviet Union) MVS	
27 September		MVS	Suborbital	Missile test	27 September	Successful
27 September	Apogee: 200 kilometres (120 mi)					
28 September; 21:01	(United States) LGM-30A Minuteman IA		(United States) Vandenberg LC-394A-3		(United States) US Air Force	
28 September; 21:01		US Air Force	Suborbital	Missile test	28 September	Launch failure
28 September; 21:01	Apogee: 50 kilometres (31 mi)					
28 September			(Soviet Union) Kapustin Yar		(Soviet Union) MVS	
28 September		MVS	Suborbital	Missile test	28 September	Successful
28 September	Apogee: 200 kilometres (120 mi)					
30 September; 06:02	(United States) Aerobee-150A		(United States) Wallops Island		(United States) NASA	
30 September; 06:02		NASA	Suborbital	XR astronomy	30 September	Successful
30 September; 06:02	Apogee: 171 kilometres (106 mi)					
September	(Soviet Union) R-14 Chusovaya		(Soviet Union) Kapustin Yar		(Soviet Union) RVSN	
September		RVSN	Suborbital	Missile test	September	Successful
September	Apogee: 675 kilometres (419 mi)					
September	(Soviet Union) R-14 Chusovaya		(Soviet Union) Kapustin Yar		(Soviet Union) RVSN	
September		RVSN	Suborbital	Missile test	September	Successful
September	Apogee: 675 kilometres (419 mi)					
3rd Quarter	(France) Berenice		(France) CERES		(France) ONERA	
3rd Quarter		ONERA	Suborbital	REV Test	3rd Quarter	Successful
3rd Quarter	Apogee: 270 kilometres (170 mi)					

- ← Jan
- Feb
- Mar
- Apr
- May
- Jun
- Jul
- Aug
- Sep
- Oct
- Nov
- Dec →
