= 1962 in spaceflight (April–June) =

This is a list of spaceflights launched between April and June 1962. For launches in the rest of the year, see 1962 in spaceflight (January–March), 1962 in spaceflight (July–September) and 1962 in spaceflight (October–December). For an overview of the whole year, see 1962 in spaceflight.

== Orbital launches ==
- ← Jan
- Feb
- Mar
- Apr
- May
- Jun
- Jul
- Aug
- Sep
- Oct
- Nov
- Dec →

Date and time (UTC)	Rocket	Flight number	Launch site		LSP	
Date and time (UTC)	Payload (⚀ = CubeSat)	Operator	Orbit	Function	Decay (UTC)	Outcome
Date and time (UTC)	Remarks					
=== April ===
6 April; 17:16	(Soviet Union) Kosmos 63S1		(Soviet Union) Kapustin Yar Mayak-2		(Soviet Union)	
6 April; 17:16	(Soviet Union) Kosmos 2 (1MS №1/Sputnik 12)		Low Earth	Technology; Cosmic rays Radiation	20 August 1963	Successful
9 April; 15:04:48	(United States) Atlas LV-3A Agena-B		(United States) Point Arguello LC-1-2		(United States) US Air Force	
9 April; 15:04:48	(United States) MIDAS-5	US Air Force	Medium Earth	Missile defence	In orbit	Successful
9 April; 15:04:48	(United States) Westford Drag	Lincoln	Medium Earth	Communications; Technology	In orbit	Successful
9 April; 15:04:48	Samos RV recovery failed, Westford Drag deployed copper dipoles, several were tracked as having decayed in the 1970s, particularly on 7 November 1976 and 22 May 1977, whilst many are still in orbit.					
18 April; 00:54	(United States) Thor DM-21 Agena-B		(United States) Vandenberg LC-75-3-5		(United States) US Air Force	
18 April; 00:54	(United States) Discoverer 39 (KH-4 2/9032)	NRO/CIA	Low Earth	Optical imaging	28 May	Successful
18 April; 00:54	(United States) SRV-584	NRO/CIA	Low Earth	Film return	22 April	Successful
18 April; 00:54	Last spacecraft to receive a Discoverer designation.					
23 April; 20:50	(United States) Atlas LV-3A Agena-B		(United States) Cape Canaveral LC-12		(United States) US Air Force	
23 April; 20:50	(United States) Ranger 4	NASA	Heliocentric	Lunar impactor	26 April; 12:49:53	Spacecraft failure
23 April; 20:50	Spacecraft timer malfunction, landed on wrong side of Moon, no data returned from impact.					
24 April; 04:00	(Soviet Union) Kosmos 63S1		(Soviet Union) Kapustin Yar Mayak-2		(Soviet Union)	
24 April; 04:00	(Soviet Union) Kosmos 3 (2MS №1/Sputnik 13)		Low Earth	Technology; Cosmic rays Radiation	17 October	Successful
26 April; 10:02	(Soviet Union) Vostok-K		(Soviet Union) Baikonur Site 1/5		(Soviet Union)	
26 April; 10:02	(Soviet Union) Kosmos 4 (Zenit-2 №2/Sputnik 14)		Low Earth	Optical imagery	29 April	Partial spacecraft failure
26 April; 10:02	Orientation system malfunctioned.					
26 April; 18:00:16	(United States) Thor DM-19 Delta		(United States) Cape Canaveral LC-17A		(United States) US Air Force	
26 April; 18:00:16	(United Kingdom) Ariel 1 (UK-1/S-51)	SERC	Low Earth	Ionospheric	24 April 1976	Successful
26 April; 18:00:16	First British satellite.					
26 April; 18:58:08	(United States) Atlas LV-3A Agena-B		(United States) Point Arguello LC-1-1		(United States) US Air Force	
26 April; 18:58:08	(United States) FTV-2401 (Samos-E6 1/Samos 7 7/E-6 1/AFP-201 PVP-851)	US Air Force	Low Earth	Optical imagery	27 April	Successful
26 April	(United States) Scout X-2		(United States) Point Arguello LC-D		(United States) US Air Force	
26 April	(United States) Solrad 4B (GRAB-4B)	US Navy/NRL	Intended: Low Earth	Radiation; ELINT	26 April	Launch failure
26 April	Final flight of Scout X-2, failed to orbit.					
29 April; 00:30:12	(United States) Thor DM-21 Agena-B		(United States) Vandenberg LC-75-3-4		(United States) US Air Force	
29 April; 00:30:12	(United States) FTV-1125 (KH-4 3/9033)	NRO/CIA	Low Earth	Optical imaging	26 May	Successful
29 April; 00:30:12	(United States) SRV-586	NRO/CIA	Low Earth	Film return	May	Spacecraft failure
29 April; 00:30:12	SRV parachute failed to deploy.					
← Jan; Feb; Mar; Apr; May; Jun; Jul; Aug; Sep; Oct; Nov; Dec →; === May ===
10 May; 12:06	(United States) Thor DM-21 Ablestar		(United States) Cape Canaveral LC-17B		(United States) US Air Force	
10 May; 12:06	(United States) ANNA 1A	US Military/NASA	Intended: Low Earth	Geodesy	10 May	Launch failure
10 May; 12:06	Second stage failed to ignite.					
15 May; 19:36	(United States) Thor DM-21 Agena-B		(United States) Vandenberg LC-75-3-5		(United States) US Air Force	
15 May; 19:36	(United States) FTV-1126 (KH-5 5/9034A)	NRO/CIA	Low Earth	Optical imaging	20 June	Successful
15 May; 19:36	(United States) SRV-582	NRO/CIA	Low Earth	Film return	19 May	Successful
24 May; 12:45:16	(United States) Atlas LV-3B		(United States) Cape Canaveral LC-14		(United States) US Air Force	
24 May; 12:45:16	(United States) Mercury-Atlas 7	NASA	Low Earth	Microgravity; Earth observation	17:41:21	Successful
24 May; 12:45:16	(United States) Balloon Subsatellite 1	NASA	Low Earth	Air density	17:41:21	Spacecraft failure
24 May; 12:45:16	Carried astronaut Scott Carpenter, Balloon Subsatellite failed to inflate, and subsequently failed to separate from Mercury spacecraft, resulting in the subsatellite's destruction during the Mercury spacecraft's re-entry.					
24 May	(United States) Scout X-2M		(United States) Point Arguello LC-D		(United States) US Air Force	
24 May	(United States) FTV-3501 (DSAP-1 F1 (DMSP-1A/P-35 1/AF-1)	US Air Force	Intended: Low Earth	Weather	24 May	Launch failure
24 May	Maiden flight of Scout X-2M, failed to orbit.					
28 May; 03:00	(Soviet Union) Kosmos 63S1		(Soviet Union) Kapustin Yar Mayak-2		(Soviet Union)	
28 May; 03:00	(Soviet Union) Kosmos 5 (2MS №2)		Low Earth	Technology; Radiation	2 May 1963	Successful
30 May; 01:00:04	(United States) Thor DM-21 Agena-B		(United States) Vandenberg LC-75-1-1		(United States) US Air Force	
30 May; 01:00:04	(United States) FTV-1128 (KH-4 4/9035)	NRO/CIA	Low Earth	Optical imaging	11 June	Successful
30 May; 01:00:04	(United States) SRV-585	NRO/CIA	Low Earth	Film return	2 June	Successful
← Jan; Feb; Mar; Apr; May; Jun; Jul; Aug; Sep; Oct; Nov; Dec →; === June ===
1 June; 09:38	(Soviet Union) Vostok-2		(Soviet Union) Baikonur Site 1/5		(Soviet Union)	
1 June; 09:38	(Soviet Union) Zenit-2 №3		Intended: Low Earth	Optical imagery	1 June	Launch failure
1 June; 09:38	Maiden flight of Vostok-2, Block B engine failed 1.8 seconds after launch, rocket fell 300 metres (980 ft) from the launch pad, damaging it.					
2 June; 00:31	(United States) Thor DM-21 Agena-B		(United States) Vandenberg LC-75-3-4		(United States) US Air Force	
2 June; 00:31	(United States) FTV-1127 (KH-4 5/9036)	NRO/CIA	Low Earth	Optical imaging	11 June	Successful
2 June; 00:31	(United States) SRV-583	NRO/CIA	Low Earth	Film return	June	Spacecraft failure
2 June; 00:31	(United States) Oscar 2	Project OSCAR	Low Earth	Amateur radio	21 June	Successful
2 June; 00:31	Parachute torn from SRV during recovery resulting in loss of capsule, Oscar 2 ceased operations on 20 June.					
17 June; 18:14:18	(United States) Atlas LV-3A Agena-B		(United States) Point Arguello LC-1-1		(United States) US Air Force	
17 June; 18:14:18	(United States) FTV-2402 (Samos 8/E-6 #2/AFP-201 PVP-852)	US Air Force	Low Earth	Optical imagery	18 June	Spacecraft failure
17 June; 18:14:18	Failed to separate from Agena after deorbit.					
18 June; 20:20	(United States) Thor DM-21 Agena-B		(United States) Vandenberg LC-75-3-5		(United States) US Air Force	
18 June; 20:20	(United States) FTV-2312 (Ferret/Samos-F2 2)	US Air Force	Low Earth	ELINT	30 October 1963	Successful
19 June; 12:19:01	(United States) Thor DM-19 Delta		(United States) Cape Canaveral LC-17A		(United States) US Air Force	
19 June; 12:19:01	(United States) TIROS-5 (Tiros-E)	NASA	Low Earth	Weather	In orbit	Successful
23 June; 00:30	(United States) Thor DM-21 Agena-B		(United States) Vandenberg LC-75-3-4		(United States) US Air Force	
23 June; 00:30	(United States) FTV-1129 (KH-4 6/9037)	NRO/CIA	Low Earth	Optical imaging	7 July	Successful
23 June; 00:30	(United States) SRV-591	NRO/CIA	Low Earth	Film return	June	Successful
28 June; 01:09	(United States) Thor DM-21 Agena-D		(United States) Vandenberg LC-75-1-1		(United States) US Air Force	
28 June; 01:09	(United States) FTV-1151 (KH-4 7/9038)	NRO/CIA	Low Earth	Optical imaging	14 September	Partial spacecraft failure
28 June; 01:09	(United States) SRV-592	NRO/CIA	Low Earth	Film return	1 July	Successful
28 June; 01:09	Maiden flight of Thor DM-21 Agena-D, images severely affected by static.					
30 June; 16:00	(Soviet Union) Kosmos 63S1		(Soviet Union) Kapustin Yar Mayak-2		(Soviet Union)	
30 June; 16:00	(Soviet Union) Kosmos 6 (DS-P1 №1/Sputnik 16)		Low Earth	Technology; Radar target	8 September	Successful
← Jan; Feb; Mar; Apr; May; Jun; Jul; Aug; Sep; Oct; Nov; Dec →
For flights after 30 June, see 1962 in spaceflight (July-September)

== Suborbital launches ==
- ← Jan
- Feb
- Mar
- Apr
- May
- Jun
- Jul
- Aug
- Sep
- Oct
- Nov
- Dec →

Date and time (UTC)	Rocket	Flight number	Launch site		LSP	
Date and time (UTC)	Payload (⚀ = CubeSat)	Operator	Orbit	Function	Decay (UTC)	Outcome
Date and time (UTC)	Remarks					
=== April ===
3 April; 04:57	(United States) Trailblazer 1		(United States) Wallops Island		(United States) NASA	
3 April; 04:57		NASA	Suborbital	REV Test	3 April	Successful
3 April; 04:57	Apogee: 260 kilometres (160 mi)					
4 April; 19:45:45	(United States) MGM-31 Pershing I		(United States) Cape Canaveral LC-30A		(United States) US Army	
4 April; 19:45:45		US Army	Suborbital	Missile test	4 April	Successful
4 April; 19:45:45	Apogee: 250 kilometres (160 mi)					
5 April; 15:47	(United Kingdom) Skylark-2		(Australia) Woomera LA-2		(United Kingdom) RAE	
5 April; 15:47		UCL	Suborbital	Aeronomy	5 April	Successful
5 April; 15:47	Apogee: 238 kilometres (148 mi)					
5 April	(United States) Nike-Zeus 3		(United States) White Sands LC-38		(United States) US Army	
5 April		US Army	Suborbital	Missile test	5 April	Successful
5 April	Apogee: 150 kilometres (93 mi)					
6 April	(Soviet Union) R-12 Dvina		(Soviet Union) Kapustin Yar		(Soviet Union) MVS	
6 April		MVS	Suborbital	Missile test	6 April	Successful
6 April	Apogee: 402 kilometres (250 mi)					
8 April	(Soviet Union) R-5A Pobeda		(Soviet Union) Chelkar		(Soviet Union) RVSN	
8 April		RVSN	Suborbital	Target	8 April	Successful
8 April	Apogee: 500 kilometres (310 mi)					
9 April; 21:07:40	(United States) SM-65F Atlas		(United States) Cape Canaveral LC-11		(United States) US Air Force	
9 April; 21:07:40		US Air Force	Suborbital	Missile test	9 April	Launch failure
10 April; 18:20	(United Kingdom) Skylark-2		(Australia) Woomera LA-2		(United Kingdom) RAE	
10 April; 18:20		UCL	Suborbital	Aeronomy	10 April	Launch failure
10 April	(Soviet Union) R-12 Dvina		(Soviet Union) Kapustin Yar		(Soviet Union) MVS	
10 April		MVS	Suborbital	Missile test	10 April	Successful
10 April	Apogee: 402 kilometres (250 mi)					
11 April	(Soviet Union) R-5A Pobeda		(Soviet Union) Chelkar		(Soviet Union) RVSN	
11 April		RVSN	Suborbital	Target	11 April	Successful
11 April	Apogee: 500 kilometres (310 mi)					
11 April	(Soviet Union) R-14 Usovaya		(Soviet Union) Kapustin Yar		(Soviet Union) RVSN	
11 April		RVSN	Suborbital	Missile test	11 April	Launch failure
12 April; 01:57:26	(United States) SM-65D Atlas		(United States) Vandenberg LC-576B-2		(United States) Strategic Air Command	
12 April; 01:57:26		Strategic Air Command	Suborbital	Missile test	12 April	Successful
12 April; 01:57:26	Apogee: 1,800 kilometres (1,100 mi)					
12 April; 16:00:25	(United States) RM-89 Blue Scout I		(United States) Cape Canaveral LC-18B		(United States) US Air Force	
12 April; 16:00:25		AFCRL	Suborbital	REV Test	12 April	Launch failure
12 April; 16:00:25	Apogee: 30 kilometres (19 mi)					
12 April	(Soviet Union) R-5A Pobeda		(Soviet Union) Chelkar		(Soviet Union) RVSN	
12 April		RVSN	Suborbital	Target	12 April	Successful
12 April	Apogee: 500 kilometres (310 mi)					
12 April	(United States) Nike-Zeus 3		(United States) Point Mugu		(United States) US Army	
12 April		US Army	Suborbital	Missile test	12 April	Successful
12 April	Apogee: 200 kilometres (120 mi)					
13 April	(Soviet Union) R-12 Dvina		(Soviet Union) Kapustin Yar		(Soviet Union) MVS	
13 April		MVS	Suborbital	Missile test	13 April	Successful
13 April	Apogee: 402 kilometres (250 mi)					
13 April	(Soviet Union) R-12 Dvina		(Soviet Union) Kapustin Yar		(Soviet Union) MVS	
13 April		MVS	Suborbital	Missile test	13 April	Successful
13 April	Apogee: 402 kilometres (250 mi)					
14 April	(Soviet Union) R-12 Dvina		(Soviet Union) Kapustin Yar		(Soviet Union) MVS	
14 April		MVS	Suborbital	Missile test	14 April	Successful
14 April	Apogee: 402 kilometres (250 mi)					
17 April; 09:28	(United States) Nike-Cajun		(United States) Wallops Island		(United States) NASA	
17 April; 09:28		NASA	Suborbital	Aeronomy	17 April	Successful
17 April; 09:28	Apogee: 119 kilometres (74 mi)					
17 April; 09:43	(United States) Nike-Asp		(United States) Wallops Island		(United States) NASA	
17 April; 09:43		GCA	Suborbital	Aeronomy	17 April	Successful
17 April; 09:43	Apogee: 201 kilometres (125 mi)					
17 April; 17:20	(United States) Aerobee-150 (Hi)		(United States) White Sands		(United States) NRL	
17 April; 17:20		NRL	Suborbital	Aeronomy	17 April	Successful
17 April; 17:20	Apogee: 286 kilometres (178 mi)					
18 April; 18:17:54	(United States) PGM-19 Jupiter		(United States) Cape Canaveral LC-26A		(Turkey) THK	
18 April; 18:17:54		THK	Suborbital	Missile test	18 April	Successful
18 April; 18:17:54	Apogee: 500 kilometres (310 mi), first Turkish spaceflight					
18 April; 19:32	(United States) Astrobee-200		(United States) Eglin		(United States) US Air Force	
18 April; 19:32		AFCRL	Suborbital	Ionospheric	18 April	Successful
18 April; 19:32	Apogee: 221 kilometres (137 mi)					
18 April	(Soviet Union) R-9 Desna		(Soviet Union) Baikonur		(Soviet Union) RVSN	
18 April		RVSN	Suborbital	Missile test	18 April	Successful
18 April	Apogee: 1,160 kilometres (720 mi)					
19 April	(United States) Nike-Zeus		(United States) Point Mugu		(United States) US Army	
19 April		US Army	Suborbital	Missile test	19 April	Launch failure
19 April	Apogee: 10 kilometres (6.2 mi)					
20 April	(Soviet Union) R-9 Desna		(Soviet Union) Baikonur		(Soviet Union) RVSN	
20 April		RVSN	Suborbital	Missile test	20 April	Launch failure
23 April	(Soviet Union) R-9 Desna		(Soviet Union) Baikonur		(Soviet Union) RVSN	
23 April		RVSN	Suborbital	Missile test	23 April	Successful
23 April	Apogee: 1,160 kilometres (720 mi)					
24 April; 17:00:00	(United States) MGM-31 Pershing I		(United States) Cape Canaveral LC-30A		(United States) US Army	
24 April; 17:00:00		US Army	Suborbital	Missile test	24 April	Launch failure
24 April; 17:00:00	Apogee: 10 kilometres (6.2 mi)					
25 April; 01:59:45	(United States) LGM-30A Minuteman IA		(United States) Cape Canaveral LC-32B		(United States) US Air Force	
25 April; 01:59:45		US Air Force	Suborbital	Missile test	25 April	Launch failure
25 April; 01:59:45	Apogee: 20 kilometres (12 mi)					
25 April; 14:00:34	(United States) Saturn C-1 (Saturn I)		(United States) Cape Canaveral LC-34		(United States) NASA	
25 April; 14:00:34	(United States) SA-2	NASA	Suborbital	Test flight	+122.56 seconds	Successful
25 April; 14:00:34	Apogee: 145 kilometres (90 mi), destroyed after test completion to release water ballast as part of Project Highwater					
25 April; 16:50:26	(United States) UGM-27 Polaris A2		(United States) USS Sam Houston, ETR		(United States) US Navy	
25 April; 16:50:26		US Navy	Suborbital	Missile test	25 April	Successful
25 April; 16:50:26	Apogee: 1,000 kilometres (620 mi)					
26 April; 16:00	(United States) Nike-Cajun		(United States) Wallops Island		(United States) (Japan) NASA/RRL	
26 April; 16:00		NASA	Suborbital	Ionospheric	26 April	Successful
26 April; 16:00	Apogee: 128 kilometres (80 mi)					
26 April	(Soviet Union) R-12 Dvina		(Soviet Union) Kapustin Yar		(Soviet Union) MVS	
26 April		MVS	Suborbital	Missile test	26 April	Successful
26 April	Apogee: 402 kilometres (250 mi)					
27 April; 17:24:45	(United States) MGM-31 Pershing I		(United States) Cape Canaveral LC-30A		(United States) US Army	
27 April; 17:24:45		US Army	Suborbital	Missile test	27 April	Successful
27 April; 17:24:45	Apogee: 250 kilometres (160 mi)					
27 April; 23:24	(United States) SM-65D Atlas		(United States) Vandenberg LC-576B-2		(United States) Strategic Air Command	
27 April; 23:24		Strategic Air Command	Suborbital	Missile test	27 April	Successful
27 April; 23:24	Apogee: 1,800 kilometres (1,100 mi)					
27 April	(United States) Nike-Zeus 3		(United States) White Sands LC-38		(United States) US Army	
27 April		US Army	Suborbital	Missile test	27 April	Successful
27 April	Apogee: 200 kilometres (120 mi)					
28 April	(Soviet Union) RT-1		(Soviet Union) Kapustin Yar		(Soviet Union) RVSN	
28 April		RVSN	Suborbital	Missile test	28 April	Successful
28 April	Apogee: 500 kilometres (310 mi)					
30 April; 18:35	(United States) Astrobee-200		(United States) Eglin		(United States) US Air Force	
30 April; 18:35		AFCRL	Suborbital	Ionospheric	30 April	Successful
30 April; 18:35	Apogee: 255 kilometres (158 mi)					
30 April	(United States) Nike-Zeus 3		(United States) White Sands LC-38		(United States) US Army	
30 April		US Army	Suborbital	Missile test	30 April	Successful
30 April	Apogee: 200 kilometres (120 mi)					
April	(Soviet Union) R-12 Dvina		(Soviet Union) Kapustin Yar		(Soviet Union) MVS	
April		MVS	Suborbital	Missile test	April	Successful
April	Apogee: 402 kilometres (250 mi)					
April	(United States) Nike-Cajun		(United States) White Sands		(United States) US Army	
April		US Air Force	Suborbital	Aeronomy	April	Successful
April	Apogee: 100 kilometres (62 mi)					
April	(United States) Nike-Cajun		(United States) White Sands		(United States) US Army	
April		US Air Force	Suborbital	Aeronomy	April	Successful
April	Apogee: 100 kilometres (62 mi)					
April	(United States) Nike-Cajun		(United States) White Sands		(United States) US Army	
April		US Air Force	Suborbital	Aeronomy	April	Successful
April	Apogee: 100 kilometres (62 mi)					
=== May ===
1 May; 13:13	(United Kingdom) Black Knight 201		(Australia) Woomera LA-5		(United Kingdom) RAE	
1 May; 13:13		UCL	Suborbital	REV test Ionospheric	1 May	Successful
1 May; 13:13	Apogee: 795 kilometres (494 mi)					
2 May; 22:53	(United States) Aerobee-150 (Hi)		(United States) White Sands LC-35		(United States) US Air Force	
2 May; 22:53		AFCRL	Suborbital	Aeronomy	2 May	Successful
2 May; 22:53	Apogee: 275 kilometres (171 mi)					
2 May; 23:44:53	(United States) Thor DSV-2E		(United States) Johnston LE-1		(United States) US Air Force	
2 May; 23:44:53		US Air Force	Suborbital	Missile test	2 May	Successful
2 May; 23:44:53	Apogee: 500 kilometres (310 mi)					
3 May; 18:03	(United States) Iris		(United States) Wallops Island LA-1		(United States) NASA	
3 May; 18:03		NASA	Suborbital	Aeronomy	3 May	Successful
3 May; 18:03	Apogee: 113 kilometres (70 mi)					
3 May; 20:00	(United States) Javelin		(United States) Wallops Island		(United States) NASA	
3 May; 20:00		NASA	Suborbital	Ionospheric	3 May	Successful
3 May; 20:00	Apogee: 845 kilometres (525 mi)					
4 May; 01:41:02	(United States) UGM-27 Polaris A2		(United States) Cape Canaveral LC-25A		(United States) US Navy	
4 May; 01:41:02		US Navy	Suborbital	Missile test	4 May	Successful
4 May; 01:41:02	Apogee: 1,000 kilometres (620 mi)					
4 May; 21:43	(United States) HGM-25A Titan I		(United States) Vandenberg LC-395A-1			
4 May; 21:43			Suborbital	Missile test	4 May	Successful
4 May; 21:43	Apogee: 1,000 kilometres (620 mi)					
6 May; 05:41:00	(United States) Trailblazer-2M		(United States) Wallops Island		(United States) US Air Force	
6 May; 05:41:00		US Air Force	Suborbital	REV Test	6 May	Successful
6 May; 05:41:00	Apogee: 280 kilometres (170 mi)					
6 May; 23:17:49	(United States) UGM-27 Polaris A2		(United States) USS Ethan Allen, Pacific Ocean		(United States) US Navy	
6 May; 23:17:49	(United States) FRIGATE BIRD	US Navy	Suborbital	Nuclear test	6 May	Successful
6 May; 23:17:49	Apogee: 500 kilometres (310 mi)					
8 May; 15:05	(United States) Aerobee-150 (Hi)		(United States) White Sands LC-35		(United States) NASA	
8 May; 15:05		NASA	Suborbital	Technology	8 May	Successful
8 May; 15:05	Apogee: 196 kilometres (122 mi)					
8 May; 19:49	(United States) Atlas LV-3C Centaur-A		(United States) Cape Canaveral LC-36A		(United States) NASA	
8 May; 19:49		NASA	Suborbital	Test flight	8 May	Launch failure
8 May; 19:49	Maiden flight of Atlas-Centaur, exploded due to insulation problem, apogee: 6 kilometres (3.7 mi)					
9 May; 13:29:59	(United States) MGM-31 Pershing I		(United States) Cape Canaveral LC-30A		(United States) US Army	
9 May; 13:29:59		US Army	Suborbital	Missile test	9 May	Launch failure
9 May; 13:29:59	Apogee: 10 kilometres (6.2 mi)					
9 May; 22:08	(United States) Nike-Zeus 3		(United States) Point Mugu		(United States) US Army	
9 May; 22:08		US Army	Suborbital	Missile test	9 May	Launch failure
9 May; 22:08	Apogee: 50 kilometres (31 mi)					
9 May; 22:15:24	(United States) UGM-27 Polaris A2		(United States) USS Sam Houston, ETR		(United States) US Navy	
9 May; 22:15:24		US Navy	Suborbital	Missile test	9 May	Launch failure
9 May; 22:15:24	Apogee: 10 kilometres (6.2 mi)					
11 May; 15:00:02	(United States) LGM-30A Minuteman IA		(United States) Cape Canaveral LC-32B		(United States) US Air Force	
11 May; 15:00:02		US Air Force	Suborbital	Missile test	11 May	Successful
11 May; 15:00:02	Apogee: 1,300 kilometres (810 mi)					
11 May; 18:26:04	(United States) UGM-27 Polaris A2		(United States) USS Sam Houston, ETR		(United States) US Navy	
11 May; 18:26:04		US Navy	Suborbital	Missile test	11 May	Successful
11 May; 18:26:04	Apogee: 1,000 kilometres (620 mi)					
12 May; 00:31:48	(United States) SM-65D Atlas		(United States) Vandenberg LC-576B-3		(United States) Strategic Air Command	
12 May; 00:31:48		Strategic Air Command	Suborbital	Missile test	12 May	Successful
12 May; 00:31:48	Apogee: 1,800 kilometres (1,100 mi)					
16 May; 17:03	(United States) Nike-Cajun		(United States) Wallops Island		(United States) (Japan) NASA/RRL	
16 May; 17:03		NASA	Suborbital	Ionospheric	16 May	Successful
16 May; 17:03	Apogee: 121 kilometres (75 mi)					
17 May; 02:04	(United States) Nike-Cajun		(United States) Wallops Island		(United States) (Japan) NASA/RRL	
17 May; 02:04		NASA	Suborbital	Ionospheric	17 May	Successful
17 May; 02:04	Apogee: 127 kilometres (79 mi)					
17 May	(Soviet Union) R-12 Dvina		(Soviet Union) Kapustin Yar		(Soviet Union) MVS	
17 May		MVS	Suborbital	Missile test	17 May	Successful
17 May	Apogee: 402 kilometres (250 mi)					
18 May; 18:01	(United States) Nike-Cajun		(United States) Wallops Island		(United States) NASA	
18 May; 18:01		Michigan	Suborbital	Aeronomy	18 May	Successful
18 May; 18:01	Apogee: 135 kilometres (84 mi)					
18 May	(France) Centaure		(France) CERES		(France) CNES	
18 May		CNET	Suborbital	Test flight	18 May	Successful
18 May	Apogee: 130 kilometres (81 mi)					
19 May; 01:59:59	(United States) LGM-30A Minuteman IA		(United States) Cape Canaveral LC-32B		(United States) US Air Force	
19 May; 01:59:59		US Air Force	Suborbital	Missile test	19 May	Successful
19 May; 01:59:59	Apogee: 1,300 kilometres (810 mi)					
21 May	(East Germany) (Soviet Union) R-2A		(Soviet Union) Kapustin Yar SP-2		(Soviet Union) NII-88	
21 May		NII-88	Suborbital	Target	21 May	Successful
21 May	Apogee: 100 kilometres (62 mi)					
22 May	(Soviet Union) R-12 Dvina		(Soviet Union) Kapustin Yar		(Soviet Union) MVS	
22 May		MVS	Suborbital	Missile test	22 May	Successful
22 May	Apogee: 402 kilometres (250 mi)					
23 May; 18:01:36	(United States) UGM-27 Polaris A2		(United States) USS Thomas A. Edison, ETR		(United States) US Navy	
23 May; 18:01:36		US Navy	Suborbital	Missile test	23 May	Successful
23 May; 18:01:36	Apogee: 1,000 kilometres (620 mi)					
23 May; 19:48:00	(United States) UGM-27 Polaris A2		(United States) USS Thomas A. Edison, ETR		(United States) US Navy	
23 May; 19:48:00		US Navy	Suborbital	Missile test	23 May	Successful
23 May; 19:48:00	Apogee: 1,000 kilometres (620 mi)					
24 May; 10:50	(Japan) Kappa-8		(Japan) Akita		(Japan) ISAS	
24 May; 10:50		RRL	Suborbital	Ionospheric	24 May	Launch failure
24 May	(France) Véronique		(France) Hammaguira Blandine		(France) CNES	
24 May		CNRS	Suborbital	Aeronomy	24 May	Successful
24 May	Apogee: 168 kilometres (104 mi)					
25 May; 12:43	(United States) Aerobee-150A		(United States) Wallops Island		(United States) NASA	
25 May; 12:43		NASA	Suborbital	Ionospheric	25 May	Successful
25 May; 12:43	Apogee: 200 kilometres (120 mi)					
26 May; 18:04	(United States) Nike-Zeus 3		(United States) Point Mugu		(United States) US Army	
26 May; 18:04		US Army	Suborbital	Missile test	26 May	Successful
26 May; 18:04	Apogee: 200 kilometres (120 mi)					
27 May	(Soviet Union) R-12 Dvina		(Soviet Union) Kapustin Yar		(Soviet Union) MVS	
27 May		MVS	Suborbital	Missile test	27 May	Successful
27 May	Apogee: 402 kilometres (250 mi)					
29 May	(France) Centaure		(France) CERES		(France) CNES	
29 May		CNRS	Suborbital	Aeronomy	29 May	Successful
29 May	Apogee: 130 kilometres (81 mi)					
29 May	(France) Centaure		(France) Reggane		(France) CNES	
29 May		CNRS	Suborbital	Aeronomy	29 May	Successful
29 May	Apogee: 130 kilometres (81 mi)					
29 May	(France) Centaure		(France) Hammaguira Bacchus		(France) CNES	
29 May		CNRS	Suborbital	Aeronomy	29 May	Successful
29 May	Apogee: 130 kilometres (81 mi)					
30 May	(Soviet Union) R-12 Dvina		(Soviet Union) Kapustin Yar		(Soviet Union) MVS	
30 May		MVS	Suborbital	Missile test	30 May	Successful
30 May	Apogee: 402 kilometres (250 mi)					
31 May; 03:01	(Australia) Long Tom		(Australia) Woomera LA-2		(Australia) WRE	
31 May; 03:01		WRE	Suborbital	Aeronomy	31 May	Successful
31 May; 03:01	Apogee: 125 kilometres (78 mi)					
31 May; 17:08:44	(United States) Blue Scout Junior SLV-1C		(United States) Point Arguello LC-A		(United States) US Air Force	
31 May; 17:08:44		US Air Force	Suborbital	Communications	31 May	Successful
31 May; 17:08:44	Apogee: 830 kilometres (520 mi)					
31 May	(France) Véronique		(Algeria) Hammaguira Blandine		(France) CNES	
31 May		CNRS	Suborbital	Aeronomy	31 May	Successful
31 May	Apogee: 100 kilometres (62 mi)					
May	(Soviet Union) MR-12		(Soviet Union) Kapustin Yar		(Soviet Union) AN	
May		AN	Suborbital	Aeronomy	May	Successful
May	Apogee: 150 kilometres (93 mi)					
=== June ===
1 June	(Soviet Union) R-16U		(Soviet Union) Baikonur		(Soviet Union) RVSN	
1 June		RVSN	Suborbital	Missile test	1 June	Successful
1 June	Apogee: 1,210 kilometres (750 mi)					
1 June	(United States) Nike-Cajun		(United States) Johnston		(United States) US Air Force	
1 June		US Air Force	Suborbital	Aeronomy	1 June	Successful
1 June	Apogee: 100 kilometres (62 mi)					
1 June	(France) Véronique		(Algeria) Hammaguira Blandine		(France) CNES	
1 June		CNRS	Suborbital	Aeronomy	1 June	Successful
1 June	Apogee: 100 kilometres (62 mi)					
2 June; 19:16:01	(United States) UGM-27 Polaris A2		(United States) USS Thomas A. Edison, ETR		(United States) US Navy	
2 June; 19:16:01		US Navy	Suborbital	Missile test	2 June	Successful
2 June; 19:16:01	Apogee: 1,000 kilometres (620 mi)					
2 June; 22:34:57	(United States) UGM-27 Polaris A2		(United States) USS Thomas A. Edison, ETR		(United States) US Navy	
2 June; 22:34:57		US Navy	Suborbital	Missile test	2 June	Successful
2 June; 22:34:57	Apogee: 1,000 kilometres (620 mi)					
4 June; 09:44:17	(United States) Thor DSV-2E		(United States) Johnston LE-1		(United States) US Air Force	
4 June; 09:44:17	(United States) BLUEGILL	US Air Force	Suborbital	Nuclear test	4 June	Successful
4 June; 09:44:17	Apogee: 500 kilometres (310 mi)					
4 June; 14:00	(United States) UGM-27 Polaris A2		(United States) Cape Canaveral LC-25A		(United States) US Navy	
4 June; 14:00		US Navy	Suborbital	Missile test	4 June	Launch failure
4 June; 14:00	Apogee: 10 kilometres (6.2 mi)					
4 June	(Soviet Union) R-14 Usovaya		(Soviet Union) Kapustin Yar		(Soviet Union) RVSN	
4 June		RVSN	Suborbital	Missile test	4 June	Successful
4 June	Apogee: 675 kilometres (419 mi)					
4 June	(France) Véronique		(France) Reggane		(France) CNES	
4 June		CNRS	Suborbital	Aeronomy	4 June	Launch failure
4 June	Apogee: 100 kilometres (62 mi)					
5 June; 04:06:21	(United States) MGM-31 Pershing I		(United States) Cape Canaveral LC-30A		(United States) US Army	
5 June; 04:06:21		US Army	Suborbital	Missile test	5 June	Successful
5 June; 04:06:21	Apogee: 250 kilometres (160 mi)					
5 June; 12:45	(United States) Aerobee-150 (Hi)		(United States) White Sands LC-35		(United States) US Air Force	
5 June; 12:45		US Air Force	Suborbital	Aeronomy; Solar	5 June	Successful
5 June; 12:45	Apogee: 216 kilometres (134 mi)					
5 June	(France) Centaure		(France) CERES		(France) CNES	
5 June		CNRS	Suborbital	Aeronomy	5 June	Successful
5 June	Apogee: 130 kilometres (81 mi)					
5 June	(France) Centaure		(France) Reggane		(France) CNES	
5 June		CNRS	Suborbital	Aeronomy	5 June	Successful
5 June	Apogee: 130 kilometres (81 mi)					
5 June	(France) Centaure		(France) Reggane		(France) CNES	
5 June		CNRS	Suborbital	Aeronomy	5 June	Successful
5 June	Apogee: 130 kilometres (81 mi)					
5 June	(France) Centaure		(France) Hammaguira Bacchus		(France) CNES	
5 June		CNRS	Suborbital	Aeronomy	5 June	Successful
5 June	Apogee: 130 kilometres (81 mi)					
5 June	(France) Centaure		(France) Hammaguira Bacchus		(France) CNES	
5 June		CNRS	Suborbital	Aeronomy	5 June	Successful
5 June	Apogee: 130 kilometres (81 mi)					
6 June; 03:00	(United Kingdom) Skylark-5C		(Australia) Woomera LA-2		(United Kingdom) RAE	
6 June; 03:00		RAE/WRE	Suborbital	Test flight	6 June	Successful
6 June; 03:00	Apogee: 240 kilometres (150 mi)					
6 June; 23:40:00	(United States) Nike-Apache		(United States) Wallops Island		(United States) NASA	
6 June; 23:40:00		Michigan	Suborbital	Aeronomy	6 June	Successful
6 June; 23:40:00	Apogee: 125 kilometres (78 mi)					
6 June	(Soviet Union) R-14 Usovaya		(Soviet Union) Kapustin Yar		(Soviet Union) RVSN	
6 June		RVSN	Suborbital	Missile test	6 June	Successful
6 June	Apogee: 675 kilometres (419 mi)					
6 June	(France) Véronique		(France) Reggane		(France) CNES	
6 June		CNRS	Suborbital	Aeronomy	6 June	Successful
6 June	Apogee: 100 kilometres (62 mi)					
7 June; 00:10	(United States) Nike-Cajun		(United States) Wallops Island		(United States) NASA	
7 June; 00:10		NASA/Michigan	Suborbital	Aeronomy	7 June	Successful
7 June; 00:10	Apogee: 120 kilometres (75 mi)					
7 June; 00:56	(United States) Nike-Asp		(United States) Wallops Island		(United States) NASA	
7 June; 00:56		GCA	Suborbital	Aeronomy	7 June	Successful
7 June; 00:56	Apogee: 162 kilometres (101 mi)					
7 June; 08:52	(United States) Nike-Asp		(United States) Wallops Island		(United States) NASA	
7 June; 08:52		GCA	Suborbital	Aeronomy	7 June	Launch failure
7 June; 08:52	Apogee: 34 kilometres (21 mi)					
7 June; 14:45	(United States) Nike-Cajun		(Pakistan) Sonmiani		(Pakistan) SUPA	
7 June; 14:45		SUPA	Suborbital	Aeronomy	7 June	Successful
7 June; 14:45	Apogee: 126 kilometres (78 mi)					
7 June; 18:21:37	(United States) LGM-25C Titan II		(United States) Cape Canaveral LC-15		(United States) US Air Force	
7 June; 18:21:37		US Air Force	Suborbital	Missile test	7 June	Successful
7 June; 18:21:37	Apogee: 1,300 kilometres (810 mi)					
7 June	(Soviet Union) R-12 Dvina		(Soviet Union) Kapustin Yar		(Soviet Union) MVS	
7 June		MVS	Suborbital	Missile test	7 June	Successful
7 June	Apogee: 402 kilometres (250 mi)					
7 June	(Soviet Union) R-16U		(Soviet Union) Baikonur		(Soviet Union) RVSN	
7 June		RVSN	Suborbital	Missile test	7 June	Successful
7 June	Apogee: 1,210 kilometres (750 mi)					
8 June; 00:53	(United States) Nike-Cajun		(United States) Wallops Island		(United States) NASA	
8 June; 00:53		NASA	Suborbital	Aeronomy	8 June	Successful
8 June; 00:53	Apogee: 117 kilometres (73 mi)					
8 June; 17:35:01	(United States) LGM-30A Minuteman IA		(United States) Cape Canaveral LC-32B		(United States) US Air Force	
8 June; 17:35:01		US Air Force	Suborbital	Missile test	8 June	Successful
8 June; 17:35:01	Apogee: 1,300 kilometres (810 mi)					
8 June	(Soviet Union) R-14 Usovaya		(Soviet Union) Kapustin Yar		(Soviet Union) RVSN	
8 June		RVSN	Suborbital	Missile test	8 June	Successful
8 June	Apogee: 675 kilometres (419 mi)					
9 June	(Soviet Union) R-9 Desna		(Soviet Union) Baikonur		(Soviet Union) RVSN	
9 June		RVSN	Suborbital	Missile test	9 June	Successful
9 June	Apogee: 1,160 kilometres (720 mi)					
11 June; 14:50	(United States) Nike-Cajun		(Pakistan) Sonmiani		(Pakistan) SUPA	
11 June; 14:50		SUPA	Suborbital	Aeronomy	11 June	Successful
11 June; 14:50	Apogee: 116 kilometres (72 mi)					
12 June; 21:30	(United States) Aerobee-150 (Hi)		(United States) White Sands LC-35		(United States) US Air Force	
12 June; 21:30		US Air Force	Suborbital	Solar	12 June	Successful
12 June; 21:30	Apogee: 299 kilometres (186 mi)					
14 June	(Soviet Union) R-9 Desna		(Soviet Union) Baikonur		(Soviet Union) RVSN	
14 June		RVSN	Suborbital	Missile test	14 June	Successful
14 June	Apogee: 1,160 kilometres (720 mi)					
15 June; 02:00:01	(United States) MGM-31 Pershing I		(United States) Cape Canaveral LC-30A		(United States) US Army	
15 June; 02:00:01		US Army	Suborbital	Missile test	15 June	Launch failure
15 June; 02:00:01	Apogee: 40 kilometres (25 mi)					
15 June; 16:48	(United States) Nike-Apache		(United States) Wallops Island		(United States) NASA	
15 June; 16:48		NASA	Suborbital	Ionospheric	15 June	Successful
15 June; 16:48	Apogee: 143 kilometres (89 mi)					
15 June	(Canada) Black Brant III		(United States) Wallops Island		(Canada) CARDE	
15 June		CARDE	Suborbital	Test flight	15 June	Launch failure
15 June	Apogee: 98 kilometres (61 mi)					
15 June	(Canada) Black Brant III		(United States) Wallops Island		(Canada) CARDE	
15 June		CARDE	Suborbital	Test flight	15 June	Launch failure
15 June	Apogee: 92 kilometres (57 mi)					
15 June	(Soviet Union) R-12 Dvina		(Soviet Union) Kapustin Yar		(Soviet Union) MVS	
15 June		MVS	Suborbital	Missile test	15 June	Successful
15 June	Apogee: 402 kilometres (250 mi)					
19 June; 00:30	(United States) PGM-17 Thor DM-18A		(United States) Vandenberg LE-8		(United Kingdom) Royal Air Force	
19 June; 00:30		Royal Air Force	Suborbital	Missile test	19 June	Successful
19 June; 00:30	Apogee: 520 kilometres (320 mi)					
19 June; 06:59	(United States) Aerobee-150 (Hi)		(United States) White Sands LC-35		(United States) US Air Force	
19 June; 06:59		ASE	Suborbital	XR astronomy	19 June	Successful
19 June; 06:59	Apogee: 224 kilometres (139 mi); first detection of X-rays emitted from outside the solar system					
19 June	(Canada) Black Brant III		(United States) Wallops Island		(Canada) CARDE	
19 June		CARDE	Suborbital	Test flight	19 June	Launch failure
19 June	Apogee: 100 kilometres (62 mi)					
19 June	(United States) Nike-Cajun		(United States) Johnston		(United States) US Air Force	
19 June		US Air Force	Suborbital	Aeronomy	19 June	Successful
19 June	Apogee: 100 kilometres (62 mi)					
19 June	(Soviet Union) R-12 Dvina		(Soviet Union) Kapustin Yar		(Soviet Union) MVS	
19 June		MVS	Suborbital	Missile test	19 June	Successful
19 June	Apogee: 402 kilometres (250 mi)					
19 June	(Soviet Union) R-9 Desna		(Soviet Union) Baikonur		(Soviet Union) RVSN	
19 June		RVSN	Suborbital	Missile test	19 June	Successful
19 June	Apogee: 1,160 kilometres (720 mi)					
20 June; 05:20	(United Kingdom) Skylark-5C		(Australia) Woomera LA-2		(United Kingdom) RAE	
20 June; 05:20		UCL	Suborbital	Aeronomy; Solar	20 June	Successful
20 June; 05:20	Apogee: 227 kilometres (141 mi)					
20 June; 08:46:16	(United States) Thor DSV-2E		(United States) Johnston LE-1		(United States) US Air Force	
20 June; 08:46:16	(United States) STARFISH	US Air Force	Suborbital	Nuclear test	20 June	Launch failure
20 June; 08:46:16	Apogee: 10 kilometres (6.2 mi)					
20 June; 13:29	(United States) Aerobee-150A		(United States) Wallops Island		(United States) NASA	
20 June; 13:29		NASA	Suborbital	Technology	20 June	Successful
20 June; 13:29	Apogee: 158 kilometres (98 mi)					
21 June	(Soviet Union) R-9 Desna		(Soviet Union) Baikonur		(Soviet Union) RVSN	
21 June		RVSN	Suborbital	Missile test	21 June	Successful
21 June	Apogee: 1,160 kilometres (720 mi)					
22 June	(Soviet Union) R-12 Dvina		(Soviet Union) Kapustin Yar		(Soviet Union) MVS	
22 June		MVS	Suborbital	Missile test	22 June	Successful
22 June	Apogee: 402 kilometres (250 mi)					
26 June; 08:38	(United States) HAD		(Australia) Woomera LA-2		(Australia) WRE	
26 June; 08:38		WRE	Suborbital	Aeronomy	26 June	Successful
26 June; 08:38	Apogee: 116 kilometres (72 mi)					
26 June; 10:57:42	(United States) SM-65D Atlas		(United States) Vandenberg LC-576B-3		(United States) Strategic Air Command	
26 June; 10:57:42		Strategic Air Command	Suborbital	Target	26 June	Successful
26 June; 10:57:42	Apogee: 1,800 kilometres (1,100 mi)					
26 June; 11:30	(United States) Nike-Zeus 3		(United States) Kwajalein		(United States) US Army	
26 June; 11:30		US Army	Suborbital	Missile test	26 June	Launch failure
26 June; 11:30	Apogee: 10 kilometres (6.2 mi)					
26 June	(Soviet Union) R-12 Dvina		(Soviet Union) Kapustin Yar		(Soviet Union) MVS	
26 June		MVS	Suborbital	Missile test	26 June	Successful
26 June	Apogee: 402 kilometres (250 mi)					
27 June; 14:10:00	(United States) Nike-Asp		(United States) Wallops Island		(United States) US Navy	
27 June; 14:10:00		NRL	Suborbital	Ionospheric	27 June	
27 June; 14:10:00	Apogee: 200 kilometres (120 mi)					
27 June	(Soviet Union) R-12 Dvina		(Soviet Union) Kapustin Yar		(Soviet Union) MVS	
27 June		MVS	Suborbital	Missile test	27 June	Successful
27 June	Apogee: 402 kilometres (250 mi)					
27 June	(France) Berenice		(France) CERES		(France) ONERA	
27 June		ONERA	Suborbital	REV Test	27 June	Successful
27 June	Apogee: 270 kilometres (170 mi)					
28 June; 00:10:00	(United States) Nike-Asp		(United States) Wallops Island		(United States) US Navy	
28 June; 00:10:00		NRL	Suborbital	Ionospheric	28 June	
28 June; 00:10:00	Apogee: 200 kilometres (120 mi)					
28 June	(Soviet Union) R-12 Dvina		(Soviet Union) Kapustin Yar		(Soviet Union) MVS	
28 June		MVS	Suborbital	Missile test	28 June	Successful
28 June	Apogee: 402 kilometres (250 mi)					
28 June	(Canada) Black Brant III		(United States) Wallops Island		(Canada) CARDE	
28 June		CARDE	Suborbital	Test flight	28 June	Launch failure
28 June	Apogee: 13 kilometres (8.1 mi)					
29 June; 05:40:00	(United States) LGM-30A Minuteman IA		(United States) Cape Canaveral LC-32B		(United States) US Air Force	
29 June; 05:40:00		US Air Force	Suborbital	Missile test	29 June	Successful
29 June; 05:40:00	Apogee: 1,300 kilometres (810 mi)					
29 June; 14:05:58	(United States) UGM-27 Polaris A2		(United States) Cape Canaveral LC-25A		(United States) US Navy	
29 June; 14:05:58		US Navy	Suborbital	Missile test	29 June	Successful
29 June; 14:05:58	Apogee: 1,000 kilometres (620 mi)					
29 June; 21:00	(United States) Aerobee-150A		(United States) Wallops Island		(United States) NASA	
29 June; 21:00		Johns Hopkins	Suborbital	Aeronomy	29 June	Successful
29 June; 21:00	Apogee: 210 kilometres (130 mi)					
29 June	(Soviet Union) R-12 Dvina		(Soviet Union) Kapustin Yar		(Soviet Union) MVS	
29 June		MVS	Suborbital	Missile test	29 June	Successful
29 June	Apogee: 402 kilometres (250 mi)					
30 June; 04:55	(United States) Aerobee-150A		(United States) Wallops Island		(United States) NASA	
30 June; 04:55		Johns Hopkins	Suborbital	Aeronomy	30 June	Successful
30 June; 04:55	Apogee: 208 kilometres (129 mi)					

- ← Jan
- Feb
- Mar
- Apr
- May
- Jun
- Jul
- Aug
- Sep
- Oct
- Nov
- Dec →
