= 1962 in spaceflight (January–March) =

This is a list of spaceflights launched between January and March 1962. For launches in the rest of the year, see 1962 in spaceflight (April–June), 1962 in spaceflight (July–September) and 1962 in spaceflight (October–December). For an overview of the whole year, see 1962 in spaceflight.

== Orbital launches ==
- ← Jan
- Feb
- Mar
- Apr
- May
- Jun
- Jul
- Aug
- Sep
- Oct
- Nov
- Dec →

Date and time (UTC)	Rocket	Flight number	Launch site		LSP	
Date and time (UTC)	Payload (⚀ = CubeSat)	Operator	Orbit	Function	Decay (UTC)	Outcome
Date and time (UTC)	Remarks					
=== January ===
13 January; 21:41	(United States) Thor DM-21 Agena-B		(United States) Vandenberg LC-75-3-4		(United States) US Air Force	
13 January; 21:41	(United States) Discoverer 37 (KH-3 6/9030)	NRO/CIA	Intended: Low Earth	Optical imaging	13 January	Launch Failure
13 January; 21:41	(United States) SRV-571	NRO/CIA	Intended: Low Earth	Film return	13 January	Launch Failure
13 January; 21:41	Last KH-3 launch, failed to orbit.					
24 January; 09:30	(United States) Thor DM-21 Ablestar		(United States) Cape Canaveral LC-17B		(United States) US Air Force	
24 January; 09:30	(United States) LOFTI 2A	US Navy/NRL	Intended: Low Earth	Technology; Ionospheric	24 January	Launch failure
24 January; 09:30	(United States) SECOR (ERGS)	US Army	Intended: Low Earth	Geodesy	24 January	Launch failure
24 January; 09:30	(United States) Solrad 4 (GRAB-4)	US Navy/NRL	Intended: Low Earth	Radiation; ELINT	24 January	Launch failure
24 January; 09:30	(United States) Injun 2	Iowa	Intended: Low Earth	Ionospheric	24 January	Launch failure
24 January; 09:30	(United States) SURCAL 1	NRL	Intended: Low Earth	Calibration	24 January	Launch failure
24 January; 09:30	Failed to orbit.					
26 January; 20:30	(United States) Atlas LV-3A Agena-B		(United States) Cape Canaveral LC-12		(United States) US Air Force	
26 January; 20:30	(United States) Ranger 3 (P-34)	NASA	Heliocentric	Lunar impactor	In orbit	Launch failure
26 January; 20:30	Upper stage guidance malfunction, missed Moon by 36,793 kilometres (22,862 mi).					
← Jan; Feb; Mar; Apr; May; Jun; Jul; Aug; Sep; Oct; Nov; Dec →; === February ===
8 February; 12:43:45	(United States) Thor DM-19 Delta	D007	(United States) Cape Canaveral LC-17A		(United States) US Air Force	
8 February; 12:43:45	(United States) TIROS-4 (Tiros-D)	NASA	Low Earth	Weather	In orbit	Successful
8 February; 12:43:45	Last signal received on 30 June.					
20 February; 14:47:39	(United States) Atlas LV-3B		(United States) Cape Canaveral LC-14		(United States) US Air Force	
20 February; 14:47:39	(United States) Mercury-Atlas 6	NASA	Low Earth	Test flight	19:43:02	Successful
20 February; 14:47:39	Carried astronaut John Glenn, first US crewed orbital spaceflight.					
21 February; 18:44	(United States) Thor DM-21 Agena-B		(United States) Vandenberg LC-75-3-5		(United States) US Air Force	
21 February; 18:44	(United States) FTV-2301 (Ferret/Samos-F2 1)	US Air Force	Low Earth	ELINT	9 March	Partial launch failure
21 February; 18:44	Upper stage failed to restart, placed in lower orbit than planned.					
27 February; 19:39	(United States) Thor DM-21 Agena-B		(United States) Vandenberg LC-75-3-4		(United States) US Air Force	
27 February; 19:39	(United States) Discoverer 38 (KH-4 1/9031)	NRO/CIA	Low Earth	Optical imaging	21 March	Partial spacecraft failure
27 February; 19:39	(United States) SRV-581	NRO/CIA	Low Earth	Film return	3 March	Successful
27 February; 19:39	First KH-4 launch, returned unfocused images.					
← Jan; Feb; Mar; Apr; May; Jun; Jul; Aug; Sep; Oct; Nov; Dec →; === March ===
7 March; 16:06:18	(United States) Thor DM-19 Delta		(United States) Cape Canaveral LC-17A		(United States) US Air Force	
7 March; 16:06:18	(United States) OSO-1 (OSO-A)	NASA	Low Earth	Solar	8 October 1981	Successful
7 March; 16:06:18	Last signal received in May 1964.					
7 March; 22:10:31	(United States) Atlas LV-3A Agena-B		(United States) Point Arguello LC-1-2		(United States) US Air Force	
7 March; 22:10:31	(United States) Samos 6	US Air Force	Low Earth	Optical imaging	3 November	Successful
7 March; 22:10:31	(United States) Samos 6 RV	US Air Force	Low Earth	Optical imaging	7 June 1963	Spacecraft failure
7 March; 22:10:31	RV recovery failed, resulting in termination of Samos film-return programme.					
16 March; 11:59	(Soviet Union) Kosmos 63S1		(Soviet Union) Kapustin Yar Mayak-2		(Soviet Union)	
16 March; 11:59	(Soviet Union) Kosmos 1 (DS-2 №1/Sputnik 11)		Low Earth	Ionospheric; Technology	25 May	Successful
← Jan; Feb; Mar; Apr; May; Jun; Jul; Aug; Sep; Oct; Nov; Dec →
For flights after 31 March, see 1962 in spaceflight (April–June)

== Suborbital launches ==
- ← Jan
- Feb
- Mar
- Apr
- May
- Jun
- Jul
- Aug
- Sep
- Oct
- Nov
- Dec →

Date and time (UTC)	Rocket	Flight number	Launch site		LSP	
Date and time (UTC)	Payload (⚀ = CubeSat)	Operator	Orbit	Function	Decay (UTC)	Outcome
Date and time (UTC)	Remarks					
=== January ===
4 January	(Soviet Union) R-16U		(Soviet Union) Baikonur Site 41/4		(Soviet Union) RVSN	
4 January		RVSN	Suborbital	Missile test	4 January	Successful
4 January	Apogee: 1,210 kilometres (750 mi)					
5 January; 15:00:02	(United States) LGM-30A Minuteman IA		(United States) Cape Canaveral LC-31B		(United States) US Air Force	
5 January; 15:00:02		US Air Force	Suborbital	Missile test	5 January	Successful
5 January; 15:00:02	Apogee: 1,300 kilometres (810 mi)					
11 January	(Soviet Union) R-14U Chusovaya		(Soviet Union) Kapustin Yar		(Soviet Union) RVSN	
11 January		RVSN	Suborbital	Missile test	11 January	Successful
11 January	Apogee: 675 kilometres (419 mi)					
13 January; 16:15	(United States) Aerobee-150A		(United States) Wallops Island		(United States) NASA	
13 January; 16:15		NASA	Suborbital	Test flight	13 January	Successful
13 January; 16:15	Apogee: 209 kilometres (130 mi)					
13 January	(Soviet Union) R-14 Chusovaya		(Soviet Union) Kapustin Yar		(Soviet Union) RVSN	
13 January		RVSN	Suborbital	Missile test	13 January	Successful
13 January	Apogee: 675 kilometres (419 mi)					
13 January	(Soviet Union) R-16U		(Soviet Union) Baikonur Site 41/4		(Soviet Union) RVSN	
13 January		RVSN	Suborbital	Missile test	13 January	Successful
13 January	Apogee: 1,210 kilometres (750 mi)					
15 January; 11:07:01	(United States) Thor DSV-2D		(United States) Cape Canaveral LC-17A		(United States) US Air Force	
15 January; 11:07:01		NASA	Suborbital	Test flight	15 January	Successful
15 January; 11:07:01	Apogee: 1,400 kilometres (870 mi)					
16 January; 18:59:59	(United States) MGM-31 Pershing I		(United States) Cape Canaveral LC-30A		(United States) US Army	
16 January; 18:59:59		US Army	Suborbital	Missile test	16 January	Successful
16 January; 18:59:59	Apogee: 250 kilometres (160 mi)					
16 January	(United States) Aerobee-150 (Hi)		(United States) White Sands LC-35		(United States) US Air Force	
16 January		US Air Force	Suborbital	Solar	16 January	Successful
16 January	Apogee: 200 kilometres (120 mi)					
16 January	(Soviet Union) R-16U		(Soviet Union) Baikonur Site 41/4		(Soviet Union) RVSN	
16 January		RVSN	Suborbital	Missile test	16 January	Successful
16 January	Apogee: 1,210 kilometres (750 mi)					
17 January; 21:02:26	(United States) SM-65D Atlas		(United States) Vandenberg LC-576B-2		(United States) Strategic Air Command	
17 January; 21:02:26		Strategic Air Command	Suborbital	Missile test	17 January	Successful
17 January; 21:02:26	Apogee: 1,800 kilometres (1,100 mi)					
17 January	(Soviet Union) R-16U		(Soviet Union) Baikonur Site 41/4		(Soviet Union) RVSN	
17 January		RVSN	Suborbital	Missile test	17 January	Successful
17 January	Apogee: 1,210 kilometres (750 mi)					
18 January	(United States) Nike-Zeus		(United States) White Sands		(United States) US Army	
18 January		US Army	Suborbital	Missile test	18 January	Successful
18 January	Apogee: 150 kilometres (93 mi)					
21 January; 00:57	(United States) HGM-25A Titan I		(United States) Vandenberg LC-395A-3		(United States) Strategic Air Command	
21 January; 00:57		Strategic Air Command	Suborbital	Missile test	21 January	Successful
21 January; 00:57	Apogee: 1,000 kilometres (620 mi)					
22 January	(Soviet Union) R-14 Chusovaya		(Soviet Union) Kapustin Yar		(Soviet Union) RVSN	
22 January		RVSN	Suborbital	Missile test	22 January	Successful
22 January	Apogee: 675 kilometres (419 mi)					
23 January; 17:05:37	(United States) UGM-27 Polaris A2		(United States) Cape Canaveral LC-29A		(United States) US Navy	
23 January; 17:05:37		US Navy	Suborbital	Missile test	23 January	Launch failure
23 January; 21:28:27	(United States) SM-65D Atlas		(United States) Vandenberg LC-576B-3		(United States) Strategic Air Command	
23 January; 21:28:27		Strategic Air Command	Suborbital	Missile test	23 January	Successful
23 January; 21:28:27	Apogee: 1,800 kilometres (1,100 mi)					
25 January; 03:26	(United States) MGM-31 Pershing I		(United States) Cape Canaveral LC-30A		(United States) US Army	
25 January; 03:26		US Army	Suborbital	Missile test	25 January	Successful
25 January; 03:26	Apogee: 250 kilometres (160 mi)					
25 January; 14:59:48	(United States) LGM-30A Minuteman IA		(United States) Cape Canaveral LC-31B		(United States) US Air Force	
25 January; 14:59:48		US Air Force	Suborbital	Missile test	25 January	Successful
25 January; 14:59:48	Apogee: 1,300 kilometres (810 mi)					
25 January; 22:02	(United States) Nike-Zeus		(United States) Point Mugu		(United States) US Army	
25 January; 22:02		US Army	Suborbital	Missile test	25 January	Successful
25 January; 22:02	Apogee: 150 kilometres (93 mi)					
25 January	(Soviet Union) R-16U		(Soviet Union) Baikonur Site 41/4		(Soviet Union) RVSN	
25 January		RVSN	Suborbital	Missile test	25 January	Successful
25 January	Apogee: 1,210 kilometres (750 mi)					
27 January	(Soviet Union) R-12 Dvina		(Soviet Union) Kapustin Yar		(Soviet Union) MVS	
27 January		MVS	Suborbital	Missile test	27 January	Successful
27 January	Apogee: 402 kilometres (250 mi)					
27 January	(Soviet Union) R-14 Chusovaya		(Soviet Union) Kapustin Yar		(Soviet Union) RVSN	
27 January		RVSN	Suborbital	Missile test	27 January	Successful
27 January	Apogee: 675 kilometres (419 mi)					
29 January; 20:00	(United States) Astrobee-200		(United States) Eglin		(United States) US Air Force	
29 January; 20:00		AFCRL	Suborbital	Aeronomy	29 January	Successful
29 January; 20:00	Apogee: 250 kilometres (160 mi)					
29 January; 23:30:56	(United States) HGM-25A Titan I		(United States) Cape Canaveral LC-19		(United States) US Air Force	
29 January; 23:30:56		US Air Force	Suborbital	Missile test	29 January	Successful
29 January; 23:30:56	Apogee: 1,000 kilometres (620 mi)					
30 January	(Soviet Union) R-12 Dvina		(Soviet Union) Kapustin Yar		(Soviet Union) MVS	
30 January		MVS	Suborbital	Missile test	30 January	Successful
30 January	Apogee: 402 kilometres (250 mi)					
=== February ===
1 February	(United States) Nike-Zeus 3		(United States) White Sands LC-38		(United States) US Army	
1 February		US Army	Suborbital	Missile test	1 February	Successful
1 February	Apogee: 150 kilometres (93 mi)					
5 February; 20:58	(United Kingdom) Skylark-5C		(Australia) Woomera LA-2		(United Kingdom) RAE	
5 February; 20:58		RAE/WRE	Suborbital	Test flight	5 February	Successful
5 February; 20:58	Apogee: 215 kilometres (134 mi)					
7 February; 04:38	(United States) Aerobee-150A		(United States) Wallops Island		(United States) NASA	
7 February; 04:38		NASA	Suborbital	UV Astronomy	7 February	Launch failure
7 February; 04:38	Apogee: 4 kilometres (2.5 mi)					
7 February; 11:50	(United States) Javelin		(United States) Wallops Island		(United States) NASA	
7 February; 11:50		NASA	Suborbital	Ionospheric	7 February	Successful
7 February; 11:50	Apogee: 960 kilometres (600 mi)					
7 February	(United States) Nike-Zeus		(United States) White Sands LC-38		(United States) US Army	
7 February		US Army	Suborbital	Missile test	7 February	Successful
7 February	Apogee: 150 kilometres (93 mi)					
11 February	(Soviet Union) R-14U Chusovaya		(Soviet Union) Kapustin Yar		(Soviet Union) RVSN	
11 February		RVSN	Suborbital	Missile test	11 February	Successful
11 February	Apogee: 675 kilometres (419 mi)					
12 February	(United States) Nike-Zeus		(United States) Point Mugu		(United States) US Army	
12 February		US Army	Suborbital	Missile test	12 February	Launch failure
12 February	Apogee: 10 kilometres (6.2 mi)					
13 February; 20:55	(United States) SM-65E Atlas		(United States) Cape Canaveral LC-13		(United States) US Air Force	
13 February; 20:55		US Air Force	Suborbital	Missile test	13 February	Successful
13 February; 20:55	Apogee: 1,600 kilometres (990 mi)					
15 February; 15:35:53	(United States) LGM-30A Minuteman IA		(United States) Cape Canaveral LC-31B		(United States) US Air Force	
15 February; 15:35:53		US Air Force	Suborbital	Missile test	15 February	Successful
15 February; 15:35:53	Apogee: 1,300 kilometres (810 mi)					
16 February; 23:04	(United States) SM-65D Atlas		(United States) Vandenberg LC-576B-2		(United States) Strategic Air Command	
16 February; 23:04		Strategic Air Command	Suborbital	Missile test	16 February	Successful
16 February; 23:04	Apogee: 1,800 kilometres (1,100 mi)					
17 February; 19:43	(United States) Aerobee-150 (Hi)		(United States) Wallops Island		(United States) NASA	
17 February; 19:43		NASA	Suborbital	Technology	17 February	Successful
17 February; 19:43	Apogee: 157 kilometres (98 mi)					
17 February	(Soviet Union) R-12 Dvina		(Soviet Union) Kapustin Yar		(Soviet Union) MVS	
17 February		MVS	Suborbital	Missile test	17 February	Successful
17 February	Apogee: 402 kilometres (250 mi)					
17 February	(Soviet Union) R-12 Dvina		(Soviet Union) Kapustin Yar		(Soviet Union) MVS	
17 February		MVS	Suborbital	Missile test	17 February	Successful
17 February	Apogee: 402 kilometres (250 mi)					
20 February; 01:00:01	(United States) MGM-31 Pershing I		(United States) Cape Canaveral LC-30A		(United States) US Army	
20 February; 01:00:01		US Army	Suborbital	Missile test	20 February	Successful
20 February; 01:00:01	Apogee: 250 kilometres (160 mi)					
20 February; 13:28	(United States) Nike-Cajun		(United States) Wallops Island		(United States) NASA	
20 February; 13:28		Michigan	Suborbital	Aeronomy	20 February	Successful
20 February; 13:28	Apogee: 132 kilometres (82 mi)					
21 February; 22:30	(United States) SM-65D Atlas		(United States) Vandenberg LC-576B-3		(United States) Strategic Air Command	
21 February; 22:30		Strategic Air Command	Suborbital	Missile test	21 February	Launch failure
21 February; 22:30	Apogee: 1,800 kilometres (1,100 mi)					
21 February	(Soviet Union) R-12 Dvina		(Soviet Union) Kapustin Yar		(Soviet Union) MVS	
21 February		MVS	Suborbital	Missile test	21 February	Successful
21 February	Apogee: 402 kilometres (250 mi)					
21 February	(United States) RAM-A		(United States) Wallops Island		(United States) NASA	
21 February		NASA	Suborbital	REV Test	21 February	Successful
21 February	Apogee: 1,000 kilometres (620 mi)					
23 February	(United States) HGM-25A Titan I		(United States) Vandenberg LC-395A-1			
23 February			Suborbital	Missile test	23 February	Launch failure
23 February	Apogee: 50 kilometres (31 mi)					
24 February	(Soviet Union) R-21		Project 658 Submarine,		(Soviet Union) RVSN	
24 February		RVSN	Suborbital	Missile test	24 February	Successful
24 February	Apogee: 293 kilometres (182 mi)					
=== March ===
1 March; 00:14:09	(United States) SM-65E Atlas		(United States) Vandenberg OSTF-1		(United States) US Air Force	
1 March; 00:14:09		US Air Force	Suborbital	Missile test	1 March	Successful
1 March; 00:14:09	Apogee: 1,600 kilometres (990 mi)					
1 March; 05:07	(United States) Scout X-1A		(United States) Wallops Island LA-3		(United States) NASA	
1 March; 05:07	(United States) P-21A	NASA	Suborbital	REV Test	1 March	Successful
1 March; 05:07	Apogee: 214 kilometres (133 mi), only flight of Scout X-1A					
1 March; 17:07	(United States) Nike-Cajun		(United States) Eglin		(United States) US Air Force	
1 March; 17:07		AFCRL	Suborbital	Aeronomy	1 March	Successful
1 March; 17:07	Apogee: 144 kilometres (89 mi)					
1 March; 19:45:01	(United States) UGM-27 Polaris A2		(United States) Cape Canaveral LC-29A		(United States) US Navy	
1 March; 19:45:01		US Navy	Suborbital	Missile test	1 March	Successful
1 March; 19:45:01	Apogee: 1,000 kilometres (620 mi)					
1 March; 23:23	(United States) Nike-Cajun		(United States) Wallops Island		(United States) NASA	
1 March; 23:23		GCA	Suborbital	Aeronomy	1 March	Successful
1 March; 23:23	Apogee: 135 kilometres (84 mi)					
1 March; 23:30	(United States) Nike-Cajun		(United States) Wallops Island		(United States) NASA	
1 March; 23:30		NASA	Suborbital	Test flight	1 March	Launch failure
1 March; 23:30	Apogee: 16 kilometres (9.9 mi)					
2 March; 00:05	(United States) Nike-Cajun		(United States) Wallops Island		(United States) NASA	
2 March; 00:05		NASA	Suborbital	Aeronomy	2 March	Successful
2 March; 00:05	Apogee: 113 kilometres (70 mi)					
2 March; 10:47	(United States) Nike-Cajun		(United States) Wallops Island		(United States) NASA	
2 March; 10:47		NASA	Suborbital	Test flight	2 March	Successful
2 March; 10:47	Apogee: 145 kilometres (90 mi)					
2 March; 10:54	(United States) Nike-Cajun		(United States) Wallops Island		(United States) NASA	
2 March; 10:54		GCA	Suborbital	Aeronomy	2 March	Successful
2 March; 10:54	Apogee: 134 kilometres (83 mi)					
2 March; 11:15	(United States) Nike-Cajun		(United States) Wallops Island		(United States) NASA	
2 March; 11:15		NASA	Suborbital	Aeronomy	2 March	Successful
2 March; 11:15	Apogee: 115 kilometres (71 mi)					
3 March	(Soviet Union) R-16U		(Soviet Union) Baikonur		(Soviet Union) RVSN	
3 March		RVSN	Suborbital	Missile test	3 March	Successful
3 March	Apogee: 1,210 kilometres (750 mi)					
5 March; 09:55	(United Kingdom) Skylark-2		(Australia) Woomera LA-2		(United Kingdom) RAE	
5 March; 09:55		UCL	Suborbital	Aeronomy	5 March	Successful
5 March; 09:55	Apogee: 233 kilometres (145 mi)					
5 March	(United States) Nike-Zeus 3		(United States) Kwajalein		(United States) US Army	
5 March		US Army	Suborbital	Missile test	5 March	Successful
5 March	Apogee: 150 kilometres (93 mi)					
6 March; 12:35	(United Kingdom) Skylark-2		(Australia) Woomera LA-2		(United Kingdom) RAE	
6 March; 12:35		UCL	Suborbital	Aeronomy	6 March	Successful
6 March; 12:35	Apogee: 173 kilometres (107 mi)					
6 March; 13:30	(United States) Aerobee-150 (Hi)		(United States) White Sands LC-35		(United States) US Air Force	
6 March; 13:30		US Air Force	Suborbital	Aeronomy	6 March	Successful
6 March; 13:30	Apogee: 323 kilometres (201 mi)					
6 March	(Soviet Union) R-12 Dvina		(Soviet Union) Kapustin Yar		(Soviet Union) MVS	
6 March		MVS	Suborbital	Missile test	6 March	Successful
6 March	Apogee: 402 kilometres (250 mi)					
8 March; 15:23:51	(United States) LGM-30A Minuteman IA		(United States) Cape Canaveral LC-31B		(United States) US Air Force	
8 March; 15:23:51		US Air Force	Suborbital	Missile test	8 March	Successful
8 March; 15:23:51	Apogee: 1,300 kilometres (810 mi)					
9 March; 00:16	(United States) Nike-Zeus 3		(United States) Point Mugu		(United States) US Army	
9 March; 00:16		US Army	Suborbital	Missile test	9 March	Launch failure
9 March; 00:16	Apogee: 10 kilometres (6.2 mi)					
13 March	(United States) Nike-Zeus 3		(United States) White Sands LC-38		(United States) US Army	
13 March		US Army	Suborbital	Missile test	13 March	Successful
13 March	Apogee: 150 kilometres (93 mi)					
13 March	(United States) Nike-Zeus 3		(United States) White Sands LC-38		(United States) US Army	
13 March		US Army	Suborbital	Missile test	13 March	Successful
13 March	Apogee: 150 kilometres (93 mi)					
14 March	(United States) Terrier-Asp IV		(United States) Point Arguello LC-B		(United States) US Navy	
14 March		NOTS	Suborbital	Test flight	14 March	Successful
14 March	Apogee: 150 kilometres (93 mi)					
15 March; 23:31:50	(United States) MGM-31 Pershing I		(United States) Cape Canaveral LC-30A		(United States) US Army	
15 March; 23:31:50		US Army	Suborbital	Missile test	15 March	Successful
15 March; 23:31:50	Apogee: 250 kilometres (160 mi)					
16 March; 18:08:58	(United States) LGM-25C Titan II		(United States) Cape Canaveral LC-16		(United States) US Air Force	
16 March; 18:08:58		US Air Force	Suborbital	Missile test	16 March	Successful
16 March; 18:08:58	Apogee: 1,300 kilometres (810 mi)					
16 March	(United States) Nike-Cajun		(United States) Eglin		(United States) US Air Force	
16 March		US Air Force	Suborbital	Aeronomy	16 March	Successful
16 March	Apogee: 100 kilometres (62 mi)					
19 March; 11:04	(United Kingdom) Skylark-2		(Australia) Woomera LA-2		(United Kingdom) RAE	
19 March; 11:04		UCL	Suborbital	Aeronomy	19 March	Successful
19 March; 11:04	Apogee: 140 kilometres (87 mi)					
19 March; 15:30	(United States) Aerobee-150A		(United States) Wallops Island		(United States) NASA	
19 March; 15:30		Michigan	Suborbital	Aeronomy	19 March	Launch failure
19 March; 15:30	Apogee: 79 kilometres (49 mi)					
19 March; 23:28	(United States) PGM-17 Thor DM-18A		(United States) Vandenberg LE-7		(United Kingdom) Royal Air Force	
19 March; 23:28		Royal Air Force	Suborbital	Missile test	19 March	Successful
19 March; 23:28	Apogee: 520 kilometres (320 mi)					
21 March	(Soviet Union) R-9 Desna		(Soviet Union) Baikonur		(Soviet Union) RVSN	
21 March		RVSN	Suborbital	Missile test	21 March	Launch failure
21 March	(China) Dongfeng 2		(China) Jiuquan LA-3		(China) PLA	
21 March		PLA	Suborbital	Missile test	21 March	Launch failure
22 March	(Soviet Union) R-9 Desna		(Soviet Union) Baikonur		(Soviet Union) RVSN	
22 March		RVSN	Suborbital	Missile test	22 March	Successful
22 March	Apogee: 1,160 kilometres (720 mi)					
23 March; 01:30:02	(United States) LGM-30A Minuteman IA		(United States) Cape Canaveral LC-32B		(United States) US Air Force	
23 March; 01:30:02		US Air Force	Suborbital	Missile test	23 March	Successful
23 March; 01:30:02	Apogee: 1,300 kilometres (810 mi)					
23 March; 23:44	(United States) Nike-Cajun		(United States) Wallops Island		(United States) NASA	
23 March; 23:44		GCA	Suborbital	Aeronomy	23 March	Successful
23 March; 23:44	Apogee: 142 kilometres (88 mi)					
23 March; 23:54	(United States) Nike-Cajun		(United States) Wallops Island		(United States) NASA	
23 March; 23:54		NASA/Michigan	Suborbital	Aeronomy	23 March	Successful
23 March; 23:54	Apogee: 121 kilometres (75 mi)					
24 March; 00:39:32	(United States) SM-65D Atlas		(United States) Vandenberg LC-576B-2		(United States) Strategic Air Command	
24 March; 00:39:32		Strategic Air Command	Suborbital	Missile test	24 March	Successful
24 March; 00:39:32	Apogee: 1,800 kilometres (1,100 mi)					
26 March; 19:03	(United States) NOTS-EV-2 Caleb		(United States) F4H Phantom II, Point Arguello		(United States) NOTS	
26 March; 19:03		NOTS/NRL	Suborbital	Aeronomy	26 March	Launch failure
26 March; 19:03	Apogee: 21 kilometres (13 mi)					
27 March; 23:48	(United States) Nike-Cajun		(United States) Wallops Island		(United States) NASA	
27 March; 23:48		GCA	Suborbital	Aeronomy	27 March	Successful
27 March; 23:48	Apogee: 117 kilometres (73 mi)					
28 March; 00:03	(United States) Nike-Cajun		(United States) Wallops Island		(United States) NASA	
28 March; 00:03		NASA	Suborbital	Aeronomy	28 March	Successful
28 March; 00:03	Apogee: 123 kilometres (76 mi)					
28 March	(Soviet Union) R-5A Pobeda		(Soviet Union) Chelkar		(Soviet Union) RVSN	
28 March		RVSN	Suborbital	Target	28 March	Successful
28 March	Apogee: 500 kilometres (310 mi)					
29 March; 07:27	(United States) Scout X-2		(United States) Wallops Island LA-3		(United States) NASA	
29 March; 07:27		NASA	Suborbital	Plasma research Aeronomy	29 March	Successful
29 March; 07:27	Apogee: 6,291 kilometres (3,909 mi), maiden flight of Scout X-2					
29 March; 09:28	(United States) HAD		(Australia) Woomera LA-2		(Australia) WRE	
29 March; 09:28		WRE	Suborbital	Aeronomy	29 March	Successful
29 March; 09:28	Apogee: 125 kilometres (78 mi)					
30 March	(United States) UGM-27 Polaris A2		(United States) Cape Canaveral LC-25A		(United States) US Navy	
30 March		US Navy	Suborbital	Missile test	30 March	Launch failure
March	(Soviet Union) RT-1		(Soviet Union) Kapustin Yar		(Soviet Union) RVSN	
March		RVSN	Suborbital	Missile test	March	Launch failure
March	Apogee: 10 kilometres (6.2 mi)					

- ← Jan
- Feb
- Mar
- Apr
- May
- Jun
- Jul
- Aug
- Sep
- Oct
- Nov
- Dec →
