= Sputnik 11 =

Sputnik 11 may refer to:

- Kosmos 1 - first Soviet satellite in the Earth Satellite series
- Vostok 1 - first spacecraft to carry a human
