= Kosmos 8 =

Soviet research satellite

- Mission type: Military technology Micrometeorite
- Harvard designation: 1962 Alpha Xi 1
- COSPAR ID: 1962-038A
- SATCAT no.: 00367
- Mission duration: 364 jours

Spacecraft properties
- Spacecraft type: DS-K-8
- Manufacturer: Yuzhnoye
- Launch mass: 337 kg
- Power: Batteries

Start of mission
- Launch date: 18 August 1962; 05:02:00 GMT
- Rocket: Kosmos-2I 63S1
- Launch site: Kapustin Yar, Mayak-2
- Contractor: Yuzhnoye

End of mission
- Decay date: 17 August 1963

Orbital parameters
- Reference system: Geocentric
- Regime: Low Earth
- Perigee altitude: 251 km
- Apogee altitude: 591 km
- Inclination: 49.0°
- Period: 92.9 minutes
- Epoch: 18 August 1962

Kosmos 8 (Russian: Космос 8 meaning Cosmos 8), also known as DS-K-8 No.1 and occasionally in the West as Sputnik 18 was a technology demonstration satellite which was launched by the Soviet Union in 1962. It was the eighth satellite to be designated under the Kosmos system, and the third spacecraft launched as part of the DS programme to successfully reach orbit, after Kosmos 1 and Kosmos 6. Its primary mission was to demonstrate the technologies of SIGINT for future Soviet military satellites.

== Spacecraft ==
Kosmos 8 was the only DS-K-8 satellite to be launched. It also carried a micrometeorite detector payload which discovered meteoroid flux. It had a mass of 337 kilograms (743 lb).

== Mission ==
This satellite tested the Kust-8 SIGINT equipment in orbit. It was launched aboard of the eighth flight of the Kosmos-2I 63S1 rocket. The launch was conducted from Mayak-2 at Kapustin Yar, and occurred at 05:02:00 GMT on 18 August 1962. Kosmos 8 was placed into a low Earth orbit with a perigee of 251 kilometres (156 mi), an apogee of 591 kilometres (367 mi), an inclination of 49.0°, and an orbital period of 92.9 minutes. It decayed on 17 August 1963, one day short of a year after its launch.

== See also ==
- 1962 in spaceflight
