= MR-12 =

MR-12 is a Soviet/Russian sounding rocket. The MR-12 has a maximum altitude of 180 km, a diameter of 0.45 m, a length of 8.77 m and a fin span of 1.40 m. The MR-12 was first launched on May 1st, 1965, and it would remain in service until its retirement in 1997.
