= FTV-1126 =

American area survey optical reconnaissance satellite

- Mission type: Optical reconnaissance
- Operator: US Air Force/NRO
- Harvard designation: 1962 Sigma 1
- COSPAR ID: 1962-018A
- SATCAT no.: 00292

Spacecraft properties
- Spacecraft type: KH-5 Argon
- Bus: Agena-B
- Manufacturer: Lockheed
- Launch mass: 1,150 kilograms (2,540 lb)

Start of mission
- Launch date: 15 May 1962, 19:36 UTC
- Rocket: Thor DM-21 Agena-B 334
- Launch site: Vandenberg LC-75-3-5

End of mission
- Decay date: 26 November 1963

Orbital parameters
- Reference system: Geocentric
- Regime: Low Earth
- Perigee altitude: 284 kilometers (176 mi)
- Apogee altitude: 632 kilometers (393 mi)
- Inclination: 82.3 degrees
- Period: 93.75 minutes

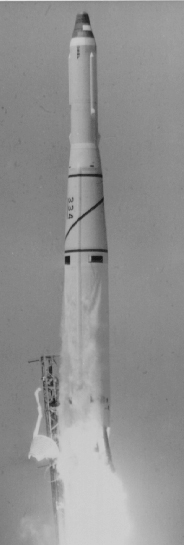
The launch of FTV-1126

FTV-1126, also known as Corona 9034A, was an American area survey optical reconnaissance satellite launched in 1962. It was a KH-5 Argon satellite, based on an Agena-B. It was also unofficially known as Discoverer 41, a continuation of the designation sequence used for previous US reconnaissance satellites, which had officially been discontinued after Discoverer 38. It was the first KH-5 satellite to complete its mission successfully.

The launch of FTV-1126 occurred at 19:36 UTC on 15 May 1962. A Thor DM-21 Agena-B rocket was used, flying from Launch Complex 75-3-5 at the Vandenberg Air Force Base. Upon successfully reaching orbit, it was assigned the Harvard designation 1962 Sigma 1.

FTV-1126 was operated in a low Earth orbit, with a perigee of 284 kilometres (176 mi), an apogee of 632 kilometres (393 mi), 82.3 degrees of inclination, and a period of 93.75 minutes. The satellite had a mass of 1,150 kilograms (2,540 lb), and was equipped with a frame camera with a focal length of 76 millimetres (3.0 in), which had a maximum resolution of 140 metres (460 ft). Images were recorded onto 127-millimeter (5.0 in) film, and returned in a Satellite Recovery Vehicle, before the satellite ceased operations. The Satellite Recovery Vehicle used by FTV-1126 was 582. Once its images had been returned, the inactive FTV-1126 decayed from orbit on 26 November 1963.
