= FTV-1132 =

American area survey optical reconnaissance satellite

- Mission type: Optical reconnaissance
- Operator: US Air Force/NRO
- Harvard designation: 1962 Alpha Upsilon 1
- COSPAR ID: 1962-044A
- SATCAT no.: 00385

Spacecraft properties
- Spacecraft type: KH-5 Argon
- Bus: Agena-B
- Manufacturer: Lockheed
- Launch mass: 1,150 kilograms (2,540 lb)

Start of mission
- Launch date: 1 September 1962, 20:39 UTC
- Rocket: Thor DM-21 Agena-B 348
- Launch site: Vandenberg LC-75-3-5

End of mission
- Decay date: 26 October 1964

Orbital parameters
- Reference system: Geocentric
- Regime: Low Earth
- Perigee altitude: 288 kilometers (179 mi)
- Apogee altitude: 670 kilometers (420 mi)
- Inclination: 82.8 degrees
- Period: 94.2 minutes

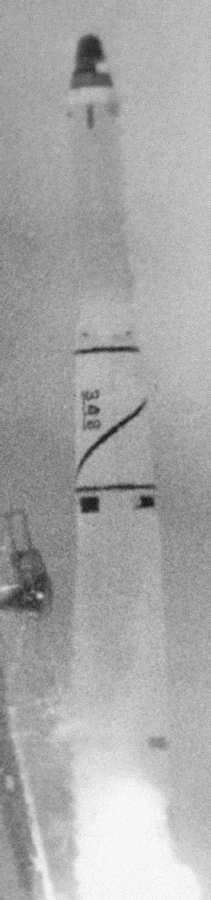
The launch of FTV-1132

FTV-1132, also known as the Corona 9042A, was an American area survey optical reconnaissance satellite which was launched in 1962. It was a KH-5 Argon satellite, based on an Agena-B. The satellite operated successfully, but its film capsule was lost during recovery due to a parachute failure.

The launch of FTV-1132 occurred at 20:39 UTC on 1 September 1962. A Thor DM-21 Agena-B rocket was used, flying from Launch Complex 75-3-5 at the Vandenberg Air Force Base. Upon successfully reaching orbit, it was assigned the Harvard designation 1962 Alpha Upsilon 1.

FTV-1132 was operated in a low Earth orbit, with a perigee of 288 kilometres (179 mi), an apogee of 670 kilometres (420 mi), 82.8 degrees of inclination, and a period of 94.2 minutes. The satellite had a mass of 1,150 kilograms (2,540 lb), and was equipped with a frame camera with a focal length of 76 millimetres (3.0 in), which had a maximum resolution of 140 metres (460 ft). Images were recorded onto 127-millimeter (5.0 in) film, and returned in a Satellite Recovery Vehicle, before the satellite ceased operations. The Satellite Recovery Vehicle used by FTV-1132 was SRV-600. Following atmospheric reentry, SRV-600 was to have been collected in mid-air by a Fairchild C-119J Flying Boxcar aircraft, but when this was attempted the parachute separated from the spacecraft, causing the capsule to fall into the sea. FTV-1132 decayed from orbit on 26 October 1964.
