= Argo D-4 Javelin =

American sounding rocket

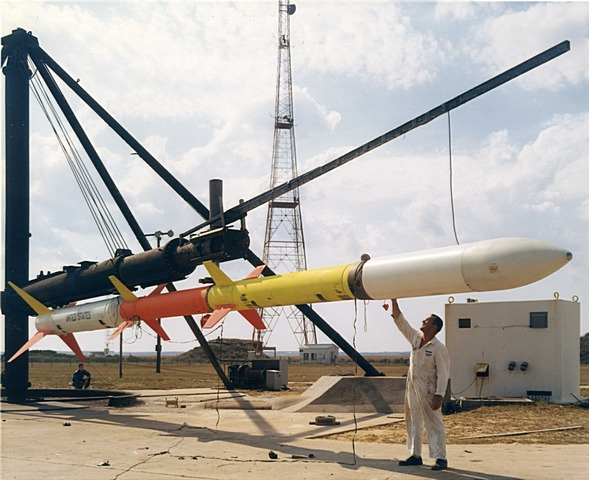
Javelin (Argo-D4) sounding rocket

Javelin (Argo D-4) was the designation of an American sounding rocket. The four stage Javelin rocket had a payload of around 125 pounds (57 kg), an apogee of 1100 kilometers, a liftoff thrust of 365 kilonewtons (82,100 lbf), a total mass of 3,385 kilograms (7,463 lb), and a core diameter of 580 millimeters (22.8 in). It was launched 82 times between 1959 and 1976.

This vehicle consisted of an Honest John first stage plus two Nike Ajax stages plus a X-248 stage. First NASA use in 1959. Could lift 45 kg (100 lb) to 800 km (500 mi).

It was launched 85 times between 1959 and 1976.
