= Trailblazer (rocket) =

Trailblazer was an American series of rockets used between 1959 and 1973 for research on atmospheric reentry. Both vehicles were tested at the Wallops Flight Facility on Wallops Island, Accomack County, Virginia and were located under the NASA Langley program (itself located at the Langley Research Center near Hampton, Virginia).

== Trailblazer 1 ==
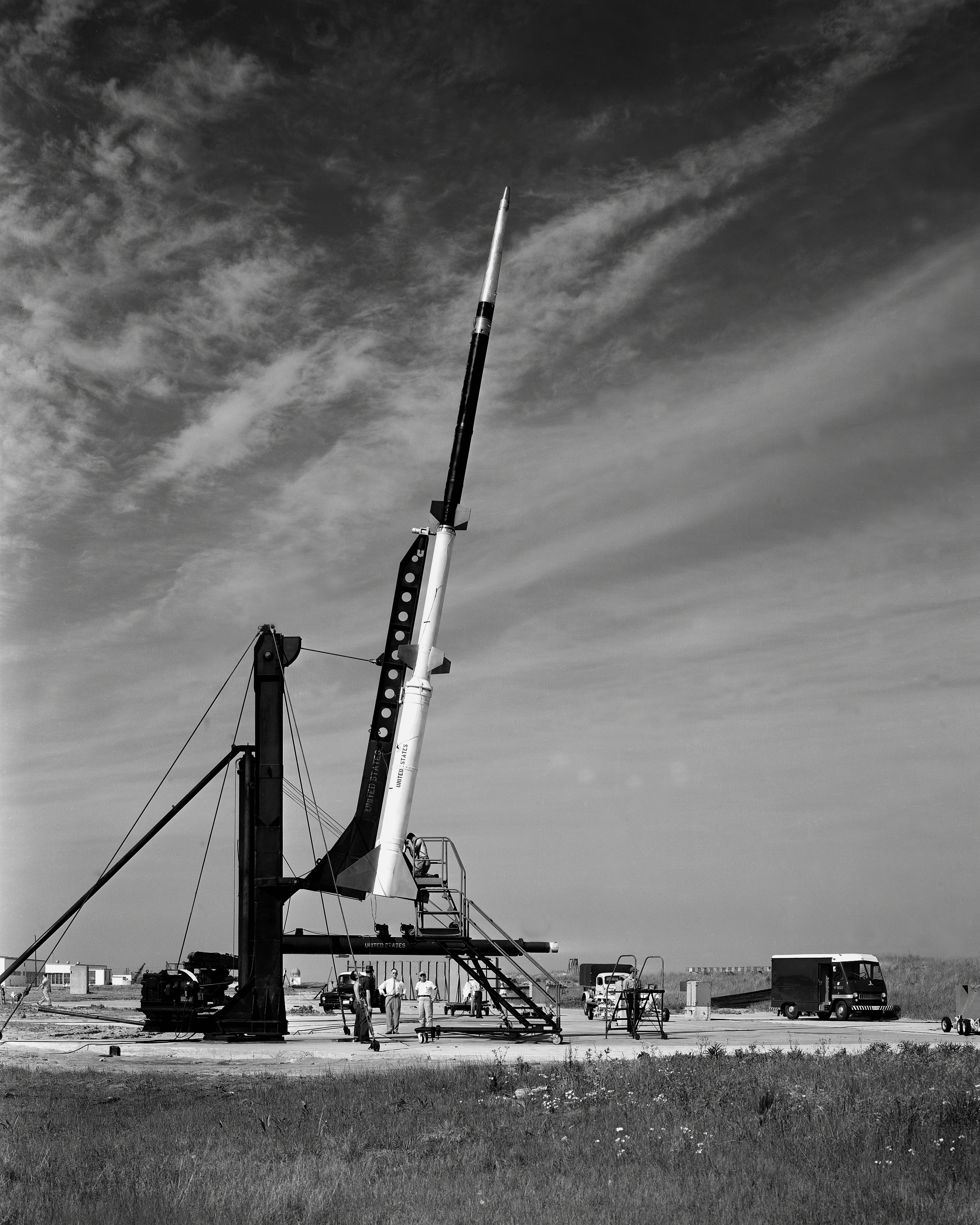
Trailblazer-1B is prepared for launch, June 4, 1959

Trailblazer 1 (thrust: 365 kN/82,055 lbf; mass: 3,400 kg/7,400 lb; height: 17.1 m/56.1 ft; diameter: 0.58 m/1.9 ft) was first launched on March 3, 1959, and was retired in 1963 (last launch: February 16, 1963). The vehicle had six stages: TX-77, M-6, M5E1, Cygnus 5, T-40, and T-55. Its first three stages took the upper stage package (Cygnus 5, T-40, and T-55 motors) to an apogee, either 260 km/162 mi or 280 km/170 mi, when the upper stages fired in unison, pushing the payload (a 13 cm sphere) back into Earth's atmosphere at sizable reentry speeds. In each test, a different material was used, and ground workers could observe the spectral density and luminance of the artificial "meteorites" that had been created. On the 1G mission, a more realistic artificial meteorite (a 5.8 g steel bearing) was used as the payload, which was launched into the atmosphere with a reentry speed of 6 km/s by a "seventh stage", used after the sixth stage had been depleted. Thus, a reference was provided for the luminance of the trails of the artificial meteorites resulting from later tests.

== Trailblazer 2 ==
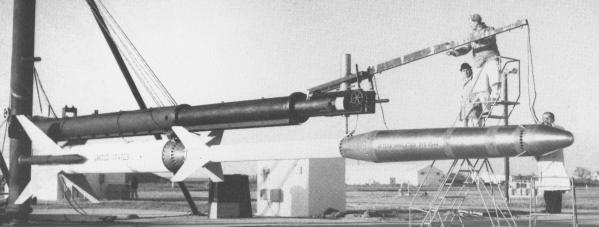
Trailblazer 2

Trailblazer 2 (thrust: 547 kN/122,970 lbf; mass: 6,100 kg/13,400 lb; height: 15.7 m/51.5 ft; diameter: 0.79 m/2.59 ft) was first launched on December 14, 1961, and was retired in 1973 (last launch: December 6, 1973). Trailblazer 2 sent objects back into the atmosphere much in the same way Trailblazer 1 did, however it was much larger and stronger than Trailblazer 1. Also, due to the sheer size of it, Trailblazer 2 could hold instruments for measuring and sending data to the ground, greatly enhancing its utility to researchers. Trailblazer 2's apogee was around 300 km/180 mi, and its payload was around 18 kg. Its stages were Altair 1, Cygnus 15, TX-77, 1.5KS35000, and Castor 1. Like Trailblazer 1, Trailblazer 2 carried out artificial meteorite experiments. It used 0.7-0.8 g steel balls that were launched at 6.1 km/s.
