= Kosmos 1 =

Soviet research satellite

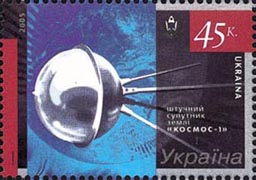
- Stamp of Ukraine of 2005 (Scott 583)
- Names: Sputnik 11; DS-2 No.1
- Mission type: Technology demonstration Ionosphere
- Harvard designation: 1962 Theta 1
- COSPAR ID: 1962-008A
- SATCAT no.: 266
- Mission duration: 2 months and 9 days

Spacecraft properties
- Spacecraft: DS-2 No.1
- Spacecraft type: Dnepropetrovsk Sputnik
- Bus: DS-2
- Launch mass: 315 kg (694 lb)

Start of mission
- Launch date: 16 March 1962, 11:59 GMT
- Rocket: Kosmos-2I 63S1
- Launch site: Kapustin Yar, Mayak-2
- Contractor: Yuzhnoye
- Entered service: 16 March 1962

End of mission
- Decay date: 25 May 1962

Orbital parameters
- Reference system: Geocentric orbit
- Regime: Low Earth orbit
- Perigee altitude: 207 km (129 mi)
- Apogee altitude: 649 km (403 mi)
- Inclination: 49.0°
- Period: 93.1 minutes

Kosmos 1 (Russian: Космос 1 meaning Cosmos 1), also known as DS-2 No.1 and occasionally in the West as Sputnik 11 was a technology demonstration and ionospheric research satellite launched by the Soviet Union in 1962. It was the first satellite to be designated under the Kosmos system, and the first spacecraft launched as part of the Dnepropetrovsk Sputnik programme to successfully reach orbit.

== History ==
Kosmos 1 was a DS-2 satellite, the first of two to be launched. The second, DS-2 No.2, was launched on 1 December 1964, but did not reach orbit after the payload fairing of the launch vehicle carrying it failed to separate. The DS-2 was a scaled-down version of the earlier DS-1 satellite, without the cylindrical section for avionics, which was built after the first two DS-1 spacecraft failed, DS-1 No.1 on 27 October 1961, and DS-1 No.2 on 21 December 1961, to reach orbit.

== Spacecraft ==
Its primary missions were to measure the performance of its launch vehicle, and to conduct research into the ionosphere. It had a mass of 315 kg (694 lb).

== Mission ==
It was launched on Kosmos-2I 63S1 s/n 6LK launch vehicle. It was the third flight of the Kosmos-2I, and the first to successfully reach orbit. It was also the first Kosmos launch vehicle of any type to successfully place a satellite into orbit. The launch was conducted from Mayak-2 at Kapustin Yar, and occurred at 11:59 GMT on 16 March 1962. Kosmos 1 was placed into a low Earth orbit with a perigee of 207 km (129 mi), an apogee of 649 km (403 mi), an inclination of 49.0°, and an orbital period of 93.1 minutes. It decayed on 25 May 1962.

== See also ==
- 1962 in spaceflight
