= 1961 in spaceflight =

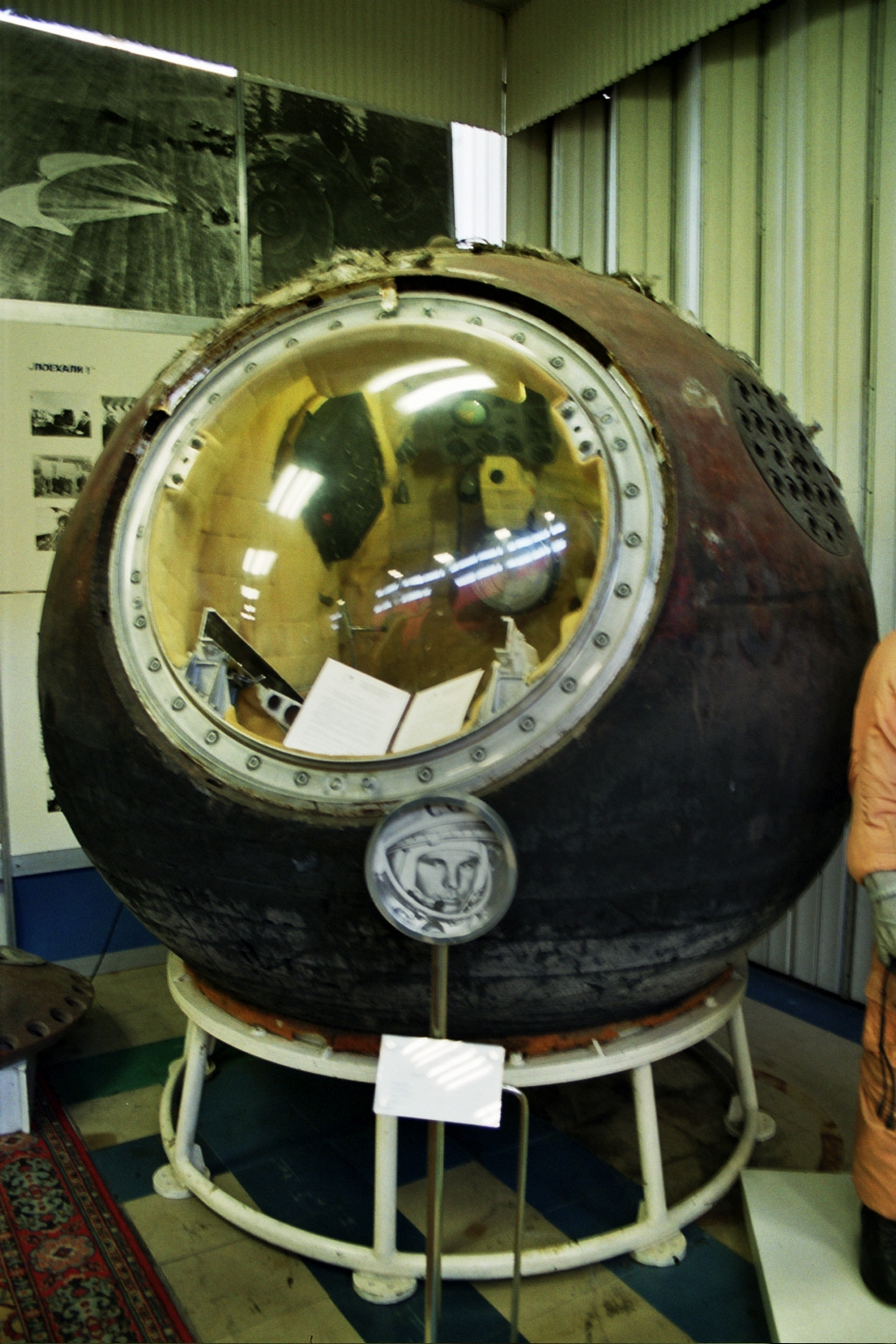
- The Vostok 1 spacecraft, aboard which Yuri Gagarin became the first man to orbit the Earth on 12 April 1961

Orbital launches
- First: 31 January
- Last: 22 December
- Total: 50
- Successes: 28
- Failures: 20
- Partial failures: 2
- Catalogued: 36

National firsts
- Spaceflight: Italy
- Space traveller: Soviet Union; United States

Rockets
- Maiden flights: Atlas LV-3A Agena-B; RM-90 Blue Scout II; Kosmos-2I 63S1; Saturn I (suborbital test)
- Retirements: Atlas LV-3A Agena-A; RM-90 Blue Scout II; Juno II; Scout X-1

Crewed flights
- Orbital: 2
- Suborbital: 2
- Total travellers: 4

1961 in spaceflight

- ← Jan
- Feb
- Mar
- Apr
- May
- Jun
- Jul
- Aug
- Sep
- Oct
- Nov
- Dec →

== Deep Space Rendezvous ==
Date (GMT)	Spacecraft	Event	Remarks
19 May	Venera 1	First flyby of Venus	Spacecraft was already non-functional as communication had been lost en route, closest approach: 100,000 kilometres (62,000 mi)

== Notable creations of orbital debris ==
Date/Time (UTC)	Source object	Event type	Pieces tracked	Remarks
29 June	Thor-Able upper stage of Transit 4A navigation satellite	Rocket explosion	294	First explosion of a rocket stage in orbit creating hundreds of debris pieces

== Orbital launch statistics ==
Country	Launches	Successes	Failures	Partial failures
Soviet Union	9	5	4	0
United States	41	23	16	2
World	50	28	20	2

=== By rocket ===
Rocket	Country	Family	Launches	Successes	Failures	Partial failures	Remarks
Atlas LV-3A Agena-A	United States	Atlas	1	1	0	0	Retired
Atlas LV-3A Agena-B	United States	Atlas	7	2	4	1	Maiden flight
Atlas LV-3B	United States	Atlas	3	2	1	0	First orbital launch
RM-90 Blue Scout II	United States	Scout	1	0	1	0	Only orbital launch
Juno II	United States	Jupiter	3	1	2	0	Retired
Kosmos-2I 63S1	Soviet Union	Kosmos	2	0	2	0	Maiden flight
Molniya 8K78	Soviet Union	R-7	2	1	1	0	
Scout X-1	United States	Scout	3	1	2	0	Retired
Thor DM-21 Ablestar	United States	Thor	3	2	0	1	
Thor DM-21 Agena-B	United States	Thor	17	11	6	0	
Thor DM-19 Delta	United States	Thor	3	3	0	0	
Vostok-K 8K72K	Soviet Union	R-7	5	4	1	0	

=== By family ===
Family	Country	Launches	Successes	Failures	Partial failures	Remarks
Atlas	United States	11	5	5	1	
Jupiter	United States	3	1	2	0	Retired
Kosmos (rocket)	Soviet Union	2	0	2	0	Maiden flight
R-7 8K78	Soviet Union	7	5	2	0	
Scout	United States	4	1	3	0	
Thor	United States	23	16	6	1	

=== By orbit ===
Orbital regime	Launches	Achieved	Not Achieved	Accidentally Achieved	Remarks
Low Earth	41	28	13	3	
Medium Earth	1	1	0	0	
High Earth	6	2	4	0	Including Highly elliptical orbits
Heliocentric	2	1	1	0	
