= 1962 in spaceflight (October–December) =

This is a list of spaceflights launched between October and December 1962. For launches in the rest of the year, see 1962 in spaceflight (January–March), 1962 in spaceflight (April–June) and 1962 in spaceflight (July–September). For an overview of the whole year, see 1962 in spaceflight.

== Orbital launches ==
- ← Jan
- Feb
- Mar
- Apr
- May
- Jun
- Jul
- Aug
- Sep
- Oct
- Nov
- Dec →

Date and time (UTC)	Rocket	Flight number	Launch site		LSP	
Date and time (UTC)	Payload (⚀ = CubeSat)	Operator	Orbit	Function	Decay (UTC)	Outcome
Date and time (UTC)	Remarks					
=== October ===
2 October; 22:11:30	(United States) Delta A	D013	(United States) Cape Canaveral LC-17B		(United States) US Air Force	
2 October; 22:11:30	(United States) Explorer 14 (EPE-B/S-3A)	NASA	Highly elliptical	Magnetospheric	In orbit	Successful
2 October; 22:11:30	Maiden flight of Delta A.					
3 October; 12:15:11	(United States) Atlas LV-3B		(United States) Cape Canaveral LC-14		(United States) US Air Force	
3 October; 12:15:11	(United States) Mercury-Atlas 8	NASA	Low Earth	Test flight	21:28:22	Successful
3 October; 12:15:11	Carried astronaut Wally Schirra.					
9 October; 18:35	(United States) Thor DM-21 Agena-B		(United States) Vandenberg LC-75-3-4		(United States) US Air Force	
9 October; 18:35	(United States) FTV-1134 (KH-5 7/9046)	NRO/CIA	Low Earth	Optical imaging	16 November	Partial spacecraft failure
9 October; 18:35	(United States) SRV-603	NRO/CIA	Low Earth	Film return	13 October	Successful
9 October; 18:35	Shutter malfunction, half of the film aboard the spacecraft was not used.					
17 October; 09:00:00	(Soviet Union) Vostok-2		(Soviet Union) Baikonur Site 1/5		(Soviet Union)	
17 October; 09:00:00	(Soviet Union) Kosmos 10 (Zenit-2 №6)		Low Earth	Optical imagery	21 October	Successful
18 October; 16:59	(United States) Atlas LV-3A Agena-B		(United States) Cape Canaveral LC-12		(United States) US Air Force	
18 October; 16:59	(United States) Ranger 5	NASA	Heliocentric	Lunar impactor	In orbit	Spacecraft failure
18 October; 16:59	Power system malfunction, missed Moon by 725 kilometres (450 mi).					
20 October; 04:00	(Soviet Union) Kosmos 63S1		(Soviet Union) Kapustin Yar Mayak-2		(Soviet Union)	
20 October; 04:00	(Soviet Union) Kosmos 11 (DS-A1 №1)		Low Earth	Technology	18 May 1964	Successful
24 October; 17:55:04	(Soviet Union) Molniya		(Soviet Union) Baikonur Site 1/5		(Soviet Union) RVSN	
24 October; 17:55:04	(Soviet Union) Mars-2MV-4 №1 (Sputnik 22)	RVSN	Intended: Heliocentric; Achieved: Low Earth	Mars flyby	29 October	Launch failure
24 October; 17:55:04	Upper stage engine exploded 16 seconds after ignition due to lubricant leak jamming turbopump gearbox.					
25 October	(Soviet Union) Kosmos 63S1		(Soviet Union) Kapustin Yar Mayak-2		(Soviet Union)	
25 October	(Soviet Union) 1MS №2		Intended: Low Earth	Technology; Radiation	25 October	Launch failure
25 October	Failed to orbit					
26 October; 16:14	(United States) Thor DM-21 Agena-D		(United States) Vandenberg LC-75-1-2		(United States) US Air Force	
26 October; 16:14	(United States) STARAD	US Air Force	Medium Earth	Radiation	5 October 1967	Successful
27 October; 23:15:01	(United States) Delta A	D014	(United States) Cape Canaveral LC-17B		(United States) US Air Force	
27 October; 23:15:01	(United States) Explorer 15 (EPE-C/S-3B)	NASA	Medium Earth	Radiation	In orbit	Successful
27 October; 23:15:01	Final flight of Delta A.					
31 October; 08:08	(United States) Thor DM-21 Ablestar		(United States) Cape Canaveral LC-17A		(United States) US Air Force	
31 October; 08:08	(United States) ANNA 1B	US Military/NASA	Low Earth	Geodesy	In orbit	Successful
31 October; 08:08	Final flight of Thor DM-21 Ablestar.					
← Jan; Feb; Mar; Apr; May; Jun; Jul; Aug; Sep; Oct; Nov; Dec →; === November ===
1 November; 16:14:16	(Soviet Union) Molniya		(Soviet Union) Baikonur Site 1/5		(Soviet Union) RVSN	
1 November; 16:14:16	(Soviet Union) Mars 1 (2MV-4 №2/Sputnik 23)	RVSN	Heliocentric	Mars flyby	In orbit	Spacecraft failure
1 November; 16:14:16	Communications system failed on 21 March 1963, prior to flyby.					
4 November; 15:35:15	(Soviet Union) Molniya		(Soviet Union) Baikonur Site 1/5		(Soviet Union) RVSN	
4 November; 15:35:15	(Soviet Union) Mars 2MV-3 №1 (Sputnik 24)	RVSN	Intended: Heliocentric; Achieved: Low Earth	Mars flyby	5 November	Launch failure
4 November; 15:35:15	Fuse shaken loose by vibrations, causing upper stage to fail to restart.					
5 November; 22:04	(United States) Thor DM-21 Agena-B		(United States) Vandenberg LC-75-3-4		(United States) US Air Force	
5 November; 22:04	(United States) FTV-1136 (KH-4 14/9047)	NRO/CIA	Low Earth	Optical imaging	3 December	Partial spacecraft failure
5 November; 22:04	(United States) SRV-599	NRO/CIA	Low Earth	Film return	10 November	Successful
5 November; 22:04	Camera door malfunction, 15 per cent of film unusable.					
11 November; 20:17:02	(United States) Atlas LV-3A Agena-B		(United States) Point Arguello LC-1-1		(United States) US Air Force	
11 November; 20:17:02	(United States) Samos-E6 5 (Samos-11/FTV-2405/AFP-201 PVP-855)	US Air Force	Low Earth	Optical imagery	12 November	Spacecraft failure
11 November; 20:17:02	(United States) ERS-1	US Air Force	Low Earth	Technology	12 November	Spacecraft failure
11 November; 20:17:02	TRS failed to separate from FTV-2405, recovery of FTV failed.					
24 November; 22:01	(United States) Thor DM-21 Agena-B		(United States) Vandenberg LC-75-3-4		(United States) US Air Force	
24 November; 22:01	(United States) FTV-1135 (KH-4 15/9048)	NRO/CIA	Low Earth	Optical imaging	13 December	Partial spacecraft failure
24 November; 22:01	(United States) SRV-601	NRO/CIA	Low Earth	Film return	November	Successful
24 November; 22:01	Some film damaged by exposure through base of satellite.					
← Jan; Feb; Mar; Apr; May; Jun; Jul; Aug; Sep; Oct; Nov; Dec →; === December ===
4 December; 21:30	(United States) Thor DM-21 Agena-D		(United States) Vandenberg LC-75-1-2		(United States) US Air Force	
4 December; 21:30	(United States) FTV-1155 (KH-4 15/9049)	NRO/CIA	Low Earth	Optical imaging	8 December	Successful
4 December; 21:30	(United States) SRV-606	NRO/CIA	Low Earth	Film return	December	Spacecraft failure
4 December; 21:30	Parachute tore during SRV. recovery					
13 December; 04:07	(United States) Thor DM-21 Agena-D		(United States) Vandenberg LC-75-1-1		(United States) US Air Force	
13 December; 04:07	(United States) Poppy 1A (NRL PL120)	NRO	Medium Earth	ELINT	9 February 1967	Successful
13 December; 04:07	(United States) Poppy 1B (NRL PL121)	NRO	Medium Earth		1 July 1963	Successful
13 December; 04:07	(United States) Injun 3	Iowa	Medium Earth	Ionospheric	25 August 1968	Successful
13 December; 04:07	(United States) SURCAL 2	NRL	Medium Earth	Calibration	18 January 1966	Successful
13 December; 04:07	(United States) Calsphere 1	NRL	Medium Earth	Calibration	5 February 1967	Successful
13 December; 23:30:01	(United States) Delta B	D015	(United States) Cape Canaveral LC-17A		(United States) US Air Force	
13 December; 23:30:01	(United States) Relay 1 (A-15)	NASA	Medium Earth	Communications; Technology	In orbit	Successful
13 December; 23:30:01	Maiden flight of Delta B.					
14 December; 21:26	(United States) Thor DM-21 Agena-D		(United States) Vandenberg LC-75-3-5		(United States) US Air Force	
14 December; 21:26	(United States) FTV-1156 (KH-4 17/9050)	NRO/CIA	Low Earth	Optical imaging	8 January 1963	Successful
14 December; 21:26	(United States) SRV-606	NRO/CIA	Low Earth	Film return	18/19 December	Successful
16 December; 14:33:04	(United States) Scout X-3		(United States) Wallops Island LA-3		(United States) NASA	
16 December; 14:33:04	(United States) Explorer 16 (S-55b)	NASA	Low Earth	Technology; Micrometeoroid	In orbit	Successful
16 December; 14:33:04	Maiden flight of Scout X-3.					
17 December; 20:36:33	(United States) Atlas LV-3A Agena-B		(United States) Point Arguello LC-1-2		(United States) US Air Force	
17 December; 20:36:33	(United States) MIDAS-6	US Air Force	Intended: Medium Earth	Missile defence	17 December	Launch failure
17 December; 20:36:33	(United States) ERS-3	US Air Force	Intended: Medium Earth	Technology	17 December	Launch failure
17 December; 20:36:33	(United States) ERS-4	US Air Force	Intended: Medium Earth	Technology	17 December	Launch failure
17 December; 20:36:33	Failed to orbit.					
19 December; 01:25:45	(United States) Scout X-3		(United States) Point Arguello LC-D		(United States) US Air Force	
19 December; 01:25:45	(United States) Transit 5A-1	US Navy	Low Earth	Technology; Navigation	25 September 1968	Spacecraft failure
19 December; 01:25:45	Power system failed within a day of operations.					
22 December; 09:32	(Soviet Union) Vostok-2		(Soviet Union) Baikonur Site 1/5		(Soviet Union)	
22 December; 09:32	(Soviet Union) Kosmos 12 (Zenit-2 №7)		Low Earth	Optical imagery	30 December	Successful
← Jan; Feb; Mar; Apr; May; Jun; Jul; Aug; Sep; Oct; Nov; Dec →

== Suborbital launches ==
- ← Jan
- Feb
- Mar
- Apr
- May
- Jun
- Jul
- Aug
- Sep
- Oct
- Nov
- Dec →

Date and time (UTC)	Rocket	Flight number	Launch site		LSP	
Date and time (UTC)	Payload (⚀ = CubeSat)	Operator	Orbit	Function	Decay (UTC)	Outcome
Date and time (UTC)	Remarks					
=== October ===
2 October; 11:46:25	(United States) SM-65D Atlas		(United States) Vandenberg LC-576B-2		(United States) Strategic Air Command	
2 October; 11:46:25		Strategic Air Command	Suborbital	Target	2 October	Launch failure
2 October; 11:46:25	Apogee: 500 kilometres (310 mi)					
5 October	(Soviet Union) R-16U		(Soviet Union) Baikonur Site 41/4		(Soviet Union) RVSN	
5 October		RVSN	Suborbital	Missile test	5 October	Successful
5 October	Apogee: 1,210 kilometres (750 mi)					
5 October	(Soviet Union) R-16U		(Soviet Union) Baikonur Site 60/8		(Soviet Union) RVSN	
5 October		RVSN	Suborbital	Missile test	5 October	Successful
5 October	Apogee: 1,210 kilometres (750 mi)					
6 October; 15:30	(United States) UGM-27 Polaris A3		(United States) Cape Canaveral LC-29A		(United States) US Navy	
6 October; 15:30		US Navy	Suborbital	Missile test	6 October	Launch failure
6 October; 15:30	Apogee: 10 kilometres (6.2 mi)					
6 October	(United States) HGM-25A Titan I		(United States) Vandenberg LC-395A-1			
6 October			Suborbital	Missile test	6 October	Successful
6 October	Apogee: 1,000 kilometres (620 mi)					
7 October	(United States) Nike-Cajun		(United States) Eglin		(United States) US Air Force	
7 October		AFCRL	Suborbital	Aeronomy; Ionospheric	7 October	Successful
7 October	Apogee: 100 kilometres (62 mi)					
11 October; 00:30	(United States) Nike-Cajun		(United States) Eglin		(United States) US Air Force	
11 October; 00:30		AFCRL	Suborbital	Aeronomy; Ionospheric	11 October	Successful
11 October; 00:30	Apogee: 100 kilometres (62 mi)					
11 October	(United States) Honest John-Nike		(United States) Barking Sands		(United States) US Air Force	
11 October		Michigan	Suborbital	Aeronomy	11 October	
11 October	Apogee: 100 kilometres (62 mi)					
11 October	(Soviet Union) R-16U		(Soviet Union) Baikonur		(Soviet Union) RVSN	
11 October		RVSN	Suborbital	Missile test	11 October	Successful
11 October	Apogee: 1,210 kilometres (750 mi)					
11 October	(Soviet Union) R-16U		(Soviet Union) Baikonur		(Soviet Union) RVSN	
11 October		RVSN	Suborbital	Missile test	11 October	Successful
11 October	Apogee: 1,210 kilometres (750 mi)					
12 October; 16:24:03	(United States) LGM-25C Titan II		(United States) Cape Canaveral LC-16		(United States) US Air Force	
12 October; 16:24:03		US Air Force	Suborbital	Missile test	12 October	Successful
12 October; 16:24:03	Apogee: 1,300 kilometres (810 mi)					
13 October; 06:59	(United States) Aerobee-150 (Hi)		(United States) White Sands LC-35		(United States) US Air Force	
13 October; 06:59		ASE	Suborbital	XR astronomy	13 October	Successful
13 October; 06:59	Apogee: 317 kilometres (197 mi)					
14 October	(United States) UGM-27 Polaris A1		(United States) USNS Observation Island, ETR		(United States) US Navy	
14 October		US Navy	Suborbital	Missile test	14 October	Successful
14 October	Apogee: 500 kilometres (310 mi)					
14 October	(United States) UGM-27 Polaris A1		(United States) USNS Observation Island, ETR		(United States) US Navy	
14 October		US Navy	Suborbital	Missile test	14 October	Launch failure
14 October	Apogee: 10 kilometres (6.2 mi)					
15 October; 08:39	(France) Véronique		(Algeria) Hammaguira Blandine		(France) CNES	
15 October; 08:39		CERMA	Suborbital	Biological research	15 October	Successful
15 October; 08:39	Apogee: 120 kilometres (75 mi), first launch from Algeria following independence from France					
15 October; 16:17	(United Kingdom) Skylark-2		(Australia) Woomera LA-2		(United Kingdom) RAE	
15 October; 16:17		Cambridge; UCL	Suborbital	Ionospheric	15 October	Successful
15 October; 16:17	Apogee: 154 kilometres (96 mi)					
16 October; 09:14:38	(United States) Thor DSV-2E		(United States) Johnston LE-2		(United States) US Air Force	
16 October; 09:14:38	(United States) Bluegill Double Prime	US Air Force	Suborbital	Nuclear test	16 October	Launch failure
16 October; 09:14:38	Apogee: 10 kilometres (6.2 mi)					
16 October; 15:06	(United States) Nike-Apache		(United States) Wallops Island		(United States) NASA	
16 October; 15:06		NASA	Suborbital	Ionospheric	16 October	Successful
16 October; 15:06	Apogee: 166 kilometres (103 mi)					
16 October	(Soviet Union) R-16U		(Soviet Union) Baikonur Site 60/8		(Soviet Union) RVSN	
16 October		RVSN	Suborbital	Missile test	16 October	Successful
16 October	Apogee: 1,210 kilometres (750 mi)					
17 October; 15:52	(United States) Nike-Cajun		(United States) Wallops Island		(United States) US Air Force	
17 October; 15:52		AFCRL	Suborbital	Ionospheric	17 October	Successful
17 October; 15:52	Apogee: 141 kilometres (88 mi)					
17 October	(Soviet Union) R-16U		(Soviet Union) Baikonur Site 41/4		(Soviet Union) RVSN	
17 October		RVSN	Suborbital	Missile test	17 October	Successful
17 October	Apogee: 1,210 kilometres (750 mi)					
18 October; 00:51:54	(United States) LGM-30A Minuteman IA		(United States) Cape Canaveral LC-31B		(United States) US Air Force	
18 October; 00:51:54		US Air Force	Suborbital	Missile test	18 October	Launch failure
18 October; 00:51:54	Apogee: 1 kilometre (0.62 mi)					
18 October; 01:00	(United States) Nike-Cajun		(United States) Eglin		(United States) US Air Force	
18 October; 01:00		AFCRL	Suborbital	Aeronomy	18 October	Launch failure
18 October; 01:00	Apogee: 86 kilometres (53 mi)					
18 October; 08:31	(France) Véronique		(Algeria) Hammaguira Blandine		(France) CNES	
18 October; 08:31		CERMA	Suborbital	Biological research	18 October	Successful
18 October; 08:31	Apogee: 110 kilometres (68 mi)					
18 October	(Soviet Union) R-5B Pobeda		(Soviet Union) Kapustin Yar		(Soviet Union) AN	
18 October		AN	Suborbital	Ionospheric	18 October	Successful
18 October	Apogee: 508 kilometres (316 mi)					
19 October; 18:15	(United States) SM-65F Atlas		(United States) Cape Canaveral LC-11		(United States) US Air Force	
19 October; 18:15		US Air Force	Suborbital	Missile test	19 October	Successful
19 October; 18:15	Apogee: 1,400 kilometres (870 mi)					
19 October	(France) Véronique		(Algeria) Hammaguira Blandine		(France) CNES	
19 October		LRBA	Suborbital	Test flight	19 October	Successful
19 October	Apogee: 135 kilometres (84 mi)					
20 October; 08:30	(United States) Castor-Recruit		(United States) Johnston		(United States) AEC	
20 October; 08:30	(United States) CHECKMATE	AEC	Suborbital	Nuclear test	20 October	Successful
20 October; 08:30	Apogee: 147 kilometres (91 mi)					
20 October; 08:31	(United States) (France) Strypi-Antares		(United States) Johnston		(United States) DASA	
20 October; 08:31		US Air Force	Suborbital	Test flight	20 October	Successful
20 October; 08:31	Apogee: 300 kilometres (190 mi)					
20 October; 08:32	(United States) (France) Strypi-Antares		(United States) Johnston		(United States) DASA	
20 October; 08:32		US Air Force	Suborbital	Test flight	20 October	Successful
20 October; 08:32	Apogee: 300 kilometres (190 mi)					
20 October; 09:00	(United States) Nike-Cajun		(United States) Johnston		(United States) US Air Force	
20 October; 09:00		AFCRL	Suborbital	Aeronomy	20 October	Successful
20 October; 09:00	Apogee: 100 kilometres (62 mi)					
21 October	(United States) Honest John-Nike		(United States) Barking Sands		(United States) US Air Force	
21 October		Michigan	Suborbital	Aeronomy	21 October	
21 October	Apogee: 100 kilometres (62 mi)					
22 October	(Soviet Union) R-5B Pobeda		(Soviet Union) Kapustin Yar		(Soviet Union) AN	
22 October		AN	Suborbital	Aeronomy	22 October	Successful
22 October	Apogee: 500 kilometres (310 mi)					
22 October	(Soviet Union) R-5M Pobeda		(Soviet Union) Kapustin Yar		(Soviet Union) RVSN	
22 October	(Soviet Union) K-3	RVSN	Suborbital	Nuclear test	22 October	Successful
22 October	Apogee: 500 kilometres (310 mi)					
22 October	(France) Véronique		(Algeria) Hammaguira Blandine		(France) CNES	
22 October		LRBA	Suborbital	Test flight	22 October	Successful
22 October	Apogee: 120 kilometres (75 mi)					
22 October	(Soviet Union) R-9 Desna		(Soviet Union) Baikonur		(Soviet Union) RVSN	
22 October		RVSN	Suborbital	Missile test	22 October	Launch failure
23 October; 03:44:24	(United States) MGM-31 Pershing I		(United States) Cape Canaveral LC-30A		(United States) US Army	
23 October; 03:44:24		US Army	Suborbital	Missile test	23 October	Successful
23 October; 03:44:24	Apogee: 250 kilometres (160 mi)					
23 October; 11:01	(France) Véronique		(Algeria) Hammaguira Blandine		(France) CNES	
23 October; 11:01		DFF; LPA	Suborbital	Aeronomy; Ionospheric	23 October	Successful
23 October; 11:01	Apogee: 175 kilometres (109 mi)					
23 October; 19:10:00	(United States) Honest John-Nike		(United States) Eglin		(United States) US Air Force	
23 October; 19:10:00		AFCRL	Suborbital	Ionospheric	23 October	Successful
23 October; 19:10:00	Apogee: 137 kilometres (85 mi)					
24 October; 09:46	(United States) HAD		(Australia) Woomera LA-2		(Australia) WRE	
24 October; 09:46		WRE	Suborbital	Aeronomy	24 October	Successful
24 October; 09:46	Apogee: 133 kilometres (83 mi)					
24 October; 19:00	(United States) Nike-Zeus 3		(United States) Point Mugu		(United States) US Army	
24 October; 19:00		US Army	Suborbital	Missile test	24 October	Launch failure
24 October; 19:00	Apogee: 50 kilometres (31 mi)					
25 October; 06:00	(United States) Exos		(United States) Eglin		(United States) US Air Force	
25 October; 06:00		AFCRL	Suborbital	Ionospheric	25 October	Successful
25 October; 06:00	Apogee: 669 kilometres (416 mi)					
25 October; 06:30	(United States) Nike-Cajun		(United States) Eglin		(United States) US Air Force	
25 October; 06:30		AFCRL	Suborbital	Aeronomy	25 October	Successful
25 October; 06:30	Apogee: 137 kilometres (85 mi)					
23 October; 11:19	(United States) Nike-Cajun		(United States) Eglin		(United States) US Air Force	
23 October; 11:19		AFCRL	Suborbital	Aeronomy	23 October	Successful
23 October; 11:19	Apogee: 100 kilometres (62 mi)					
23 October; 11:19	(United States) Nike-Cajun		(United States) Eglin		(United States) US Air Force	
23 October; 11:19		AFCRL	Suborbital	Aeronomy	23 October	Successful
23 October; 11:19	Apogee: 100 kilometres (62 mi)					
25 October; 23:28	(United States) Aerobee-150 (Hi)		(United States) White Sands LC-35		(United States) US Air Force	
25 October; 23:28		US Air Force	Suborbital	Solar	25 October	Successful
25 October; 23:28	Apogee: 213 kilometres (132 mi)					
25 October	(United States) Nike-Cajun		(United States) Johnston		(United States) US Air Force	
25 October		US Air Force	Suborbital	Ionospheric	25 October	Successful
25 October	Apogee: 100 kilometres (62 mi)					
26 October; 09:44:05	(United States) Thor DSV-2E		(United States) Johnston LE-1		(United States) US Air Force	
26 October; 09:44:05	(United States) BLUEGILL TRIPLE PRIME	US Air Force	Suborbital	Nuclear test	26 October	Successful
26 October; 09:44:05	Apogee: 500 kilometres (310 mi)					
26 October; 09:58	(United States) Honest John-Nike		(United States) Johnston		(United States) US Air Force	
26 October; 09:58		AFCRL	Suborbital	Ionospheric	26 October	Successful
26 October; 09:58	Apogee: 100 kilometres (62 mi)					
26 October; 10:05	(United States) Honest John-Nike		(United States) Johnston		(United States) US Air Force	
26 October; 10:05		AFCRL	Suborbital	Ionospheric	26 October	Successful
26 October; 10:05	Apogee: 100 kilometres (62 mi)					
26 October; 10:11	(United States) Honest John-Nike		(United States) Johnston		(United States) US Air Force	
26 October; 10:11		AFCRL	Suborbital	Ionospheric	26 October	Successful
26 October; 10:11	Apogee: 100 kilometres (62 mi)					
26 October; 10:15	(United States) Nike-Cajun		(United States) Johnston		(United States) US Air Force	
26 October; 10:15		US Air Force	Suborbital	Aeronomy	26 October	Successful
26 October; 10:15	Apogee: 100 kilometres (62 mi)					
26 October; 10:22	(United States) Honest John-Nike		(United States) Johnston		(United States) US Air Force	
26 October; 10:22		AFCRL	Suborbital	Ionospheric	26 October	Successful
26 October; 10:22	Apogee: 100 kilometres (62 mi)					
26 October; 10:59:25	(United States) SM-65D Atlas		(United States) Vandenberg LC-576A-1		(United States) US Air Force	
26 October; 10:59:25		AFCRL	Suborbital	Target	26 October	Successful
26 October; 10:59:25	Apogee: 1,800 kilometres (1,100 mi)					
26 October; 17:05:34	(United States) LGM-25C Titan II		(United States) Cape Canaveral LC-15		(United States) US Air Force	
26 October; 17:05:34		US Air Force	Suborbital	Missile test	26 October	Successful
26 October; 17:05:34	Apogee: 1,300 kilometres (810 mi)					
26 October	(United States) Nike-Cajun		(United States) Johnston		(United States) US Air Force	
26 October		AFCRL	Suborbital	Ionospheric	26 October	Successful
26 October	Apogee: 100 kilometres (62 mi)					
26 October	(United States) Nike-Cajun		(United States) Johnston		(United States) US Air Force	
26 October		AFCRL	Suborbital	Aeronomy	26 October	Successful
26 October	Apogee: 100 kilometres (62 mi)					
26 October	(United States) Javelin		(United States) Johnston		(United States) US Air Force	
26 October		US Air Force	Suborbital	Ionospheric	26 October	Successful
26 October	Apogee: 500 kilometres (310 mi)					
27 October	(United States) Nike-Cajun		(United States) Johnston		(United States) US Air Force	
27 October		AFCRL	Suborbital	Aeronomy	27 October	Successful
27 October	Apogee: 100 kilometres (62 mi)					
28 October	(Soviet Union) R-5M Pobeda		(Soviet Union) Kapustin Yar		(Soviet Union) RVSN	
28 October	(Soviet Union) K-4	RVSN	Suborbital	Nuclear test	28 October	Successful
28 October	Apogee: 500 kilometres (310 mi)					
28 October	(Soviet Union) R-9 Desna		(Soviet Union) Baikonur Site 51		(Soviet Union) RVSN	
28 October		RVSN	Suborbital	Missile test	28 October	Launch failure
29 October; 23:21	(France) Véronique		(Algeria) Hammaguira Blandine		(France) CNES	
29 October; 23:21		LPA	Suborbital	Aeronomy; Ionospheric	29 October	Successful
29 October; 23:21	Apogee: 180 kilometres (110 mi)					
29 October	(United States) Honest John-Nike		(United States) Barking Sands		(United States) US Air Force	
29 October		Michigan	Suborbital	Aeronomy	29 October	
29 October	Apogee: 100 kilometres (62 mi)					
30 October; 01:50	(United States) Aerobee-150A		(United States) Wallops Island		(United States) NASA	
30 October; 01:50		Wisconsin	Suborbital	UV Astronomy	30 October	Successful
30 October; 01:50	Apogee: 188 kilometres (117 mi)					
31 October; 23:33	(United States) Honest John-Nike		(United States) Eglin		(United States) US Air Force	
31 October; 23:33		AFCRL	Suborbital	Aeronomy	31 October	Launch failure
31 October; 23:33	Apogee: 100 kilometres (62 mi)					
31 October	(Soviet Union) R-12 Dvina		(Soviet Union) Kapustin Yar		(Soviet Union) MVS	
31 October		MVS	Suborbital	Missile test	31 October	Successful
31 October	Apogee: 402 kilometres (250 mi)					
October	(Soviet Union) MR-12		(Soviet Union) Sary Shagan		(Soviet Union) AN	
October		AN	Suborbital		October	Successful
October	Apogee: 150 kilometres (93 mi)					
October	(Soviet Union) MR-12		(Soviet Union) Sary Shagan		(Soviet Union) AN	
October		AN	Suborbital		October	Successful
October	Apogee: 150 kilometres (93 mi)					
October	(Soviet Union) MR-12		(Soviet Union) Sary Shagan		(Soviet Union) AN	
October		AN	Suborbital		October	Successful
October	Apogee: 150 kilometres (93 mi)					
October	(Soviet Union) MR-12		(Soviet Union) Sary Shagan		(Soviet Union) AN	
October		AN	Suborbital		October	Successful
October	Apogee: 150 kilometres (93 mi)					
October	(Soviet Union) MR-12		(Soviet Union) Sary Shagan		(Soviet Union) AN	
October		AN	Suborbital		October	Successful
October	Apogee: 150 kilometres (93 mi)					
October	(Soviet Union) MR-12		(Soviet Union) Sary Shagan		(Soviet Union) AN	
October		AN	Suborbital		October	Successful
October	Apogee: 150 kilometres (93 mi)					
October	(Soviet Union) MR-12		(Soviet Union) Sary Shagan		(Soviet Union) AN	
October		AN	Suborbital		October	Successful
October	Apogee: 150 kilometres (93 mi)					
October	(Soviet Union) MR-12		(Soviet Union) Sary Shagan		(Soviet Union) AN	
October		AN	Suborbital		October	Successful
October	Apogee: 150 kilometres (93 mi)					
October	(Soviet Union) R-12 Dvina		(Soviet Union) Kapustin Yar		(Soviet Union) MVS	
October		MVS	Suborbital	Missile test	October	Successful
October	Apogee: 402 kilometres (250 mi)					
October	(Soviet Union) R-12 Dvina		(Soviet Union) Kapustin Yar		(Soviet Union) MVS	
October		MVS	Suborbital	Missile test	October	Successful
October	Apogee: 402 kilometres (250 mi)					
October	(Soviet Union) R-12 Dvina		(Soviet Union) Kapustin Yar		(Soviet Union) MVS	
October		MVS	Suborbital	Missile test	October	Successful
October	Apogee: 402 kilometres (250 mi)					
October	(Soviet Union) R-12 Dvina		(Soviet Union) Kapustin Yar		(Soviet Union) MVS	
October		MVS	Suborbital	Missile test	October	Successful
October	Apogee: 402 kilometres (250 mi)					
October	(Soviet Union) R-12 Dvina		(Soviet Union) Kapustin Yar		(Soviet Union) MVS	
October		MVS	Suborbital	Missile test	October	Successful
October	Apogee: 402 kilometres (250 mi)					
October	(Soviet Union) R-12 Dvina		(Soviet Union) Kapustin Yar		(Soviet Union) MVS	
October		MVS	Suborbital	Missile test	October	Successful
October	Apogee: 402 kilometres (250 mi)					
October	(Soviet Union) R-12 Dvina		(Soviet Union) Kapustin Yar		(Soviet Union) MVS	
October		MVS	Suborbital	Missile test	October	Successful
October	Apogee: 402 kilometres (250 mi)					
October	(Soviet Union) R-12 Dvina		(Soviet Union) Kapustin Yar		(Soviet Union) MVS	
October		MVS	Suborbital	Missile test	October	Successful
October	Apogee: 402 kilometres (250 mi)					
October	(Soviet Union) R-12 Dvina		(Soviet Union) Kapustin Yar		(Soviet Union) MVS	
October		MVS	Suborbital	Missile test	October	Successful
October	Apogee: 402 kilometres (250 mi)					
October	(Soviet Union) R-12 Dvina		(Soviet Union) Kapustin Yar		(Soviet Union) MVS	
October		MVS	Suborbital	Missile test	October	Successful
October	Apogee: 402 kilometres (250 mi)					
October	(Soviet Union) R-12 Dvina		(Soviet Union) Kapustin Yar		(Soviet Union) MVS	
October		MVS	Suborbital	Missile test	October	Successful
October	Apogee: 402 kilometres (250 mi)					
October	(Soviet Union) R-14 Usovaya		(Soviet Union) Kapustin Yar		(Soviet Union) RVSN	
October		RVSN	Suborbital	Missile test	October	Successful
October	Apogee: 675 kilometres (419 mi)					
October	(Soviet Union) R-14 Usovaya		(Soviet Union) Kapustin Yar		(Soviet Union) RVSN	
October		RVSN	Suborbital	Missile test	October	Successful
October	Apogee: 675 kilometres (419 mi)					
October	(Soviet Union) R-14 Usovaya		(Soviet Union) Kapustin Yar		(Soviet Union) RVSN	
October		RVSN	Suborbital	Missile test	October	Successful
October	Apogee: 675 kilometres (419 mi)					
October	(Soviet Union) R-14 Usovaya		(Soviet Union) Kapustin Yar		(Soviet Union) RVSN	
October		RVSN	Suborbital	Missile test	October	Successful
October	Apogee: 675 kilometres (419 mi)					
=== November ===
1 November; 11:25	(United States) Nike-Cajun		(United States) Eglin		(United States) US Air Force	
1 November; 11:25		AFCRL	Suborbital	Aeronomy	1 November	Successful
1 November; 11:25	Apogee: 100 kilometres (62 mi)					
1 November; 11:54:48	(United States) Thor DSV-2E		(United States) Johnston LE-2		(United States) US Air Force	
1 November; 11:54:48	(United States) KINGFISH	US Air Force	Suborbital	Nuclear test	1 November	Successful
1 November; 11:54:48	Apogee: 500 kilometres (310 mi)					
1 November; 12:16	(United States) Honest John-Nike		(United States) Johnston		(United States) US Air Force	
1 November; 12:16		AFCRL	Suborbital	Ionospheric	1 November	Successful
1 November; 12:16	Apogee: 100 kilometres (62 mi)					
1 November; 12:20	(United States) Nike-Cajun		(United States) Johnston		(United States) US Air Force	
1 November; 12:20		AFCRL	Suborbital	Aeronomy	1 November	Successful
1 November; 12:20	Apogee: 100 kilometres (62 mi)					
1 November; 12:24	(United States) Honest John-Nike		(United States) Johnston		(United States) US Air Force	
1 November; 12:24		AFCRL	Suborbital	Ionospheric	1 November	Successful
1 November; 12:24	Apogee: 100 kilometres (62 mi)					
1 November; 12:40	(United States) Honest John-Nike		(United States) Johnston		(United States) US Air Force	
1 November; 12:40		AFCRL	Suborbital	Ionospheric	1 November	Successful
1 November; 12:40	Apogee: 100 kilometres (62 mi)					
2 November; 04:25:00	(United States) Honest John-Nike-Nike		(United States) Eglin		(United States) US Air Force	
2 November; 04:25:00		AFCRL	Suborbital	Aeronomy	2 November	Successful
2 November; 04:25:00	Apogee: 170 kilometres (110 mi)					
2 November; 07:34	(United States) Nike-Cajun		(United States) Johnston		(United States) US Air Force	
2 November; 07:34		AFCRL	Suborbital	Aeronomy	2 November	Launch failure
2 November; 07:34	Apogee: 100 kilometres (62 mi)					
2 November; 11:25	(United States) Nike-Cajun		(United States) Eglin		(United States) US Air Force	
2 November; 11:25		AFCRL	Suborbital	Aeronomy	2 November	Launch failure
2 November; 11:25	Apogee: 10 kilometres (6.2 mi)					
3 November	(Soviet Union) R-16U		(Soviet Union) Baikonur Site 41/4		(Soviet Union) RVSN	
3 November		RVSN	Suborbital	Missile test	3 November	Successful
3 November	Apogee: 1,210 kilometres (750 mi)					
3 November	(United States) Nike-Cajun		(United States) Johnston		(United States) US Air Force	
3 November		AFCRL	Suborbital	Aeronomy	3 November	Successful
3 November	Apogee: 100 kilometres (62 mi)					
4 November	(United States) Nike-Cajun		(United States) Johnston		(United States) US Air Force	
4 November		AFCRL	Suborbital	Aeronomy	4 November	Successful
4 November	Apogee: 100 kilometres (62 mi)					
4 November	(United States) Nike-Cajun		(United States) Johnston		(United States) US Air Force	
4 November		AFCRL	Suborbital	Aeronomy	4 November	Successful
4 November	Apogee: 100 kilometres (62 mi)					
5 November; 15:29:59	(United States) UGM-27 Polaris A3		(United States) Cape Canaveral LC-29A		(United States) US Navy	
5 November; 15:29:59		US Navy	Suborbital	Missile test	5 November	Launch failure
5 November; 15:29:59	Apogee: 10 kilometres (6.2 mi)					
6 November; 19:45	(United States) Aerobee-150 (Hi)		(United States) White Sands LC-35		(United States) US Air Force	
6 November; 19:45		US Air Force	Suborbital	Solar	6 November	Successful
6 November; 19:45	Apogee: 308 kilometres (191 mi)					
7 November; 10:25	(United States) Nike-Cajun		(United States) Wallops Island		(United States) NASA	
7 November; 10:25		GCA	Suborbital	Ionospheric	7 November	Successful
7 November; 10:25	Apogee: 132 kilometres (82 mi)					
7 November; 10:53	(United States) Nike-Apache		(United States) Wallops Island		(United States) NASA	
7 November; 10:53		GCA	Suborbital	Aeronomy	7 November	Successful
7 November; 10:53	Apogee: 165 kilometres (103 mi)					
7 November; 19:43	(United States) SM-65F Atlas		(United States) Cape Canaveral LC-11		(United States) US Air Force	
7 November; 19:43		US Air Force	Suborbital	Missile test	7 November	Successful
7 November; 19:43	Apogee: 1,400 kilometres (870 mi)					
8 November	(United States) Nike-Zeus 3		(United States) White Sands LC-38		(United States) US Army	
8 November		US Army	Suborbital	Missile test	8 November	Successful
8 November	Apogee: 200 kilometres (120 mi)					
9 November; 03:12	(United States) Nike-Zeus 3		(United States) Point Mugu		(United States) US Army	
9 November; 03:12		US Army	Suborbital	Missile test	9 November	Successful
9 November; 03:12	Apogee: 200 kilometres (120 mi)					
11 November; 01:03	(United States) Aerobee-150 (Hi)		(United States) Eglin		(United States) US Air Force	
11 November; 01:03		AFCRL	Suborbital	Aeronomy; Ionospheric	11 November	Successful
11 November; 01:03	Apogee: 260 kilometres (160 mi)					
13 November; 10:10	(United Kingdom) Skylark-7C		(Australia) Woomera LA-2		(United Kingdom) RAE	
13 November; 10:10		UCL	Suborbital	Aeronomy; Solar; Meteorite research	13 November	Successful
13 November; 10:10	Apogee: 206 kilometres (128 mi)					
13 November; 22:30	(United States) Aerobee-150 (Hi)		(United States) Eglin		(United States) US Air Force	
13 November; 22:30		AFCRL	Suborbital	Aeronomy	13 November	Successful
13 November; 22:30	Apogee: 253 kilometres (157 mi)					
14 November; 22:36:02	(United States) SM-65F Atlas		(United States) Vandenberg OSTF-2		(United States) US Air Force	
14 November; 22:36:02		US Air Force	Suborbital	Missile test	14 November	Launch failure
14 November; 22:36:02	Apogee: 300 kilometres (190 mi)					
16 November; 00:52:22	(United States) MGM-31 Pershing I		(United States) Cape Canaveral LC-30A		(United States) US Army	
16 November; 00:52:22		US Army	Suborbital	Missile test	16 November	Successful
16 November; 00:52:22	Apogee: 250 kilometres (160 mi)					
16 November; 01:26	(United States) Aerobee-150 (Hi)		(United States) Eglin		(United States) US Air Force	
16 November; 01:26		AFCRL	Suborbital	Aeronomy	16 November	Successful
16 November; 01:26	Apogee: 234 kilometres (145 mi)					
16 November; 04:22	(United States) Aerobee-150A		(United States) Wallops Island		(United States) NASA	
16 November; 04:22		CSIRO	Suborbital	Ionospheric	16 November	Launch failure
16 November; 04:22	Apogee: 29 kilometres (18 mi)					
16 November; 05:59	(United States) Nike-Cajun		(Canada) Churchill		(United States) NASA	
16 November; 05:59		NASA	Suborbital	Aeronomy	16 November	Launch failure
16 November; 05:59	Apogee: 16 kilometres (9.9 mi)					
16 November; 17:45:02	(United States) Saturn C-1 (Saturn I)		(United States) Cape Canaveral LC-34		(United States) NASA	
16 November; 17:45:02	(United States) SA-3 (Apollo)	NASA	Suborbital	Test flight	+293 seconds	Successful
16 November; 17:45:02	Apogee: 167 kilometres (104 mi), destroyed after test completion to release water ballast as part of Project Highwater					
17 November; 17:06:17	(United States) UGM-27 Polaris A3		(United States) Cape Canaveral LC-29A		(United States) US Navy	
17 November; 17:06:17		US Navy	Suborbital	Missile test	17 November	Launch failure
17 November; 17:06:17	Apogee: 50 kilometres (31 mi)					
18 November; 04:57	(United States) Aerobee-150A		(United States) Wallops Island		(United States) NASA	
18 November; 04:57		NASA	Suborbital	Technology	18 November	Successful
18 November; 04:57	Apogee: 206 kilometres (128 mi)					
19 November; 17:00:11	(United States) LGM-30A Minuteman IA		(United States) Cape Canaveral LC-31B		(United States) US Air Force	
19 November; 17:00:11		US Air Force	Suborbital	Missile test	19 November	Successful
19 November; 17:00:11	Apogee: 1,300 kilometres (810 mi)					
19 November	(Soviet Union) R-12 Dvina		(Soviet Union) Kapustin Yar		(Soviet Union) MVS	
19 November		MVS	Suborbital	Missile test	19 November	Successful
19 November	Apogee: 402 kilometres (250 mi)					
20 November; 21:41:30	(United States) Aerobee-300A		(United States) Wallops Island		(United States) NASA	
20 November; 21:41:30		Michigan; NASA	Suborbital	Aeronomy	20 November	Successful
20 November; 21:41:30	Apogee: 345 kilometres (214 mi)					
21 November; 18:20:35	(United States) Blue Scout Junior SLV-1C		(United States) Point Arguello LC-A		(United States) US Air Force	
21 November; 18:20:35		Strategic Air Command	Suborbital	Communications	21 November	Successful
21 November; 18:20:35	Apogee: 1,000 kilometres (620 mi)					
21 November	(Lebanon) Ceadar-3		(Lebanon) Dbayeh		(Lebanon) Lebanese space program	
21 November		Lebanese space program	Suborbital		21 November	Successful
21 November	First Lebanese spaceflight					
22 November; 01:11	(United Kingdom) Skylark-7		(Australia) Woomera LA-2		(United Kingdom) RAE	
22 November; 01:11		RAE/WRE	Suborbital	Test flight	22 November	Successful
22 November; 01:11	Apogee: 114 kilometres (71 mi)					
22 November	(Soviet Union) R-16U		(Soviet Union) Baikonur		(Soviet Union) RVSN	
22 November		RVSN	Suborbital	Missile test	22 November	Successful
22 November	Apogee: 1,210 kilometres (750 mi)					
24 November	(Soviet Union) R-12 Dvina		(Soviet Union) Kapustin Yar		(Soviet Union) MVS	
24 November		MVS	Suborbital	Missile test	24 November	Successful
24 November	Apogee: 402 kilometres (250 mi)					
24 November	(Soviet Union) R-16U		(Soviet Union) Baikonur Site 41/4		(Soviet Union) RVSN	
24 November		RVSN	Suborbital	Missile test	24 November	Successful
24 November	Apogee: 1,210 kilometres (750 mi)					
25 November; 02:01	(Japan) Kappa-9M		(Japan) Kagoshima		(Japan) ISAS	
25 November; 02:01		ISAS	Suborbital	Ionospheric	25 November	Launch failure
25 November; 02:01	Apogee: 58 kilometres (36 mi)					
25 November	(Soviet Union) R-16U		(Soviet Union) Baikonur Site 41/4		(Soviet Union) RVSN	
25 November		RVSN	Suborbital	Missile test	25 November	Launch failure
26 November	(France) Centaure		(Algeria) Hammaguira Bacchus		(France) CNES	
26 November		CNRS	Suborbital	Aeronomy	26 November	Successful
26 November	Apogee: 130 kilometres (81 mi)					
27 November; 10:17	(United States) HAD		(Australia) Woomera LA-2		(Australia) WRE	
27 November; 10:17		WRE	Suborbital	Aeronomy	27 November	Successful
27 November; 10:17	Apogee: 113 kilometres (70 mi)					
27 November; 18:00	(United States) Aerobee-150 (Hi)		(United States) White Sands LC-35		(United States) NASA	
27 November; 18:00		HCO	Suborbital	Solar	27 November	Successful
27 November; 18:00	Apogee: 203 kilometres (126 mi)					
27 November	(United States) Javelin		(United States) Johnston		(United States) US Air Force	
27 November		US Air Force	Suborbital	Ionospheric	27 November	Successful
27 November	Apogee: 500 kilometres (310 mi)					
27 November	(France) Centaure		(Argentina) CELPA		(France) CNES	
27 November		CNRS	Suborbital	Aeronomy	27 November	Successful
27 November	Apogee: 130 kilometres (81 mi)					
28 November; 00:00	(United States) Honest John-Nike-Nike		(United States) Eglin		(United States) US Air Force	
28 November; 00:00		AFCRL	Suborbital	Aeronomy	28 November	Successful
28 November; 00:00	Apogee: 121 kilometres (75 mi)					
28 November; 02:12:08	(United States) MGM-31 Pershing I		(United States) Cape Canaveral LC-30A		(United States) US Army	
28 November; 02:12:08		US Army	Suborbital	Missile test	28 November	Successful
28 November; 02:12:08	Apogee: 250 kilometres (160 mi)					
28 November; 10:17	(United Kingdom) Skylark-7C		(Australia) Woomera LA-2		(United Kingdom) RAE	
28 November; 10:17		UCL	Suborbital	Aeronomy	28 November	Successful
28 November; 10:17	Apogee: 230 kilometres (140 mi)					
28 November; 17:36	(France) Centaure		(Algeria) Hammaguira Bacchus		(France) CNES	
28 November; 17:36		CNRS; UCL	Suborbital	Ionospheric	28 November	Successful
28 November; 17:36	Apogee: 160 kilometres (99 mi)					
28 November; 23:25	(United States) Nike-Zeus 3		(United States) Point Mugu		(United States) US Army	
28 November; 23:25		US Army	Suborbital	Missile test	28 November	Successful
28 November; 23:25	Apogee: 200 kilometres (120 mi)					
29 November; 16:33	(United Kingdom) Black Knight 301		(Australia) Woomera LA-5		(United Kingdom) RAE	
29 November; 16:33		RAE	Suborbital	REV test	29 November	Successful
29 November; 16:33	Apogee: 576 kilometres (358 mi)					
29 November	(Soviet Union) R-12 Dvina		(Soviet Union) Kapustin Yar		(Soviet Union) MVS	
29 November		MVS	Suborbital	Missile test	29 November	Successful
29 November	Apogee: 402 kilometres (250 mi)					
29 November	(United States) Nike-Zeus 3		(United States) White Sands LC-38		(United States) US Army	
29 November		US Army	Suborbital	Missile test	29 November	Successful
29 November	Apogee: 200 kilometres (120 mi)					
30 November; 10:57	(United States) Nike-Cajun		(United States) Wallops Island		(United States) NASA	
30 November; 10:57		GCA	Suborbital	Ionospheric	30 November	Successful
30 November; 10:57	Apogee: 122 kilometres (76 mi)					
30 November; 11:15	(United States) Nike-Apache		(United States) Wallops Island		(United States) NASA	
30 November; 11:15		GCA	Suborbital	Aeronomy	30 November	Successful
30 November; 11:15	Apogee: 170 kilometres (110 mi)					
30 November; 17:36	(France) Centaure		(Algeria) Hammaguira Bacchus		(France) CNES	
30 November; 17:36		CNRS; UCL	Suborbital	Ionospheric	30 November	Successful
30 November; 17:36	Apogee: 170 kilometres (110 mi)					
30 November			(Soviet Union) Kapustin Yar		(Soviet Union) MVS	
30 November		MVS	Suborbital	Missile test	30 November	Successful
30 November	Apogee: 200 kilometres (120 mi)					
30 November			(Soviet Union) Kapustin Yar		(Soviet Union) MVS	
30 November		MVS	Suborbital	Missile test	30 November	Successful
30 November	Apogee: 200 kilometres (120 mi)					
30 November			(Soviet Union) Kapustin Yar		(Soviet Union) MVS	
30 November		MVS	Suborbital	Missile test	30 November	Successful
30 November	Apogee: 200 kilometres (120 mi)					
30 November	(France) Centaure		(Algeria) Hammaguira Bacchus		(France) CNES	
30 November		CNRS	Suborbital	Aeronomy	30 November	Successful
30 November	Apogee: 130 kilometres (81 mi)					
30 November	(France) Centaure		(Argentina) CELPA		(France) CNES	
30 November		CNRS	Suborbital	Aeronomy	30 November	Successful
30 November	Apogee: 130 kilometres (81 mi)					
30 November	(France) Centaure		(France) CERES		(France) CNES	
30 November		CNRS	Suborbital	Aeronomy	30 November	Successful
30 November	Apogee: 130 kilometres (81 mi)					
November	(Soviet Union) R-12 Dvina		(Soviet Union) Kapustin Yar		(Soviet Union) MVS	
November		MVS	Suborbital	Missile test	November	Successful
November	Apogee: 402 kilometres (250 mi)					
November	(Soviet Union) R-12 Dvina		(Soviet Union) Kapustin Yar		(Soviet Union) MVS	
November		MVS	Suborbital	Missile test	November	Successful
November	Apogee: 402 kilometres (250 mi)					
November	(Soviet Union) R-12 Dvina		(Soviet Union) Kapustin Yar		(Soviet Union) MVS	
November		MVS	Suborbital	Missile test	November	Successful
November	Apogee: 402 kilometres (250 mi)					
November	(Soviet Union) R-14 Usovaya		(Soviet Union) Kapustin Yar		(Soviet Union) RVSN	
November		RVSN	Suborbital	Missile test	November	Successful
November	Apogee: 675 kilometres (419 mi)					
November	(Soviet Union) R-14 Usovaya		(Soviet Union) Kapustin Yar		(Soviet Union) RVSN	
November		RVSN	Suborbital	Missile test	November	Successful
November	Apogee: 675 kilometres (419 mi)					
November	(Soviet Union) R-14 Usovaya		(Soviet Union) Kapustin Yar		(Soviet Union) RVSN	
November		RVSN	Suborbital	Missile test	November	Successful
November	Apogee: 675 kilometres (419 mi)					
November	(Soviet Union) R-14 Usovaya		(Soviet Union) Kapustin Yar		(Soviet Union) RVSN	
November		RVSN	Suborbital	Missile test	November	Successful
November	Apogee: 675 kilometres (419 mi)					
November	(Soviet Union) R-14 Usovaya		(Soviet Union) Kapustin Yar		(Soviet Union) RVSN	
November		RVSN	Suborbital	Missile test	November	Successful
November	Apogee: 675 kilometres (419 mi)					
November	(France) Berenice		(France) CERES		(France) ONERA	
November		ONERA	Suborbital	REV Test	November	Successful
November	Apogee: 270 kilometres (170 mi)					
=== December ===
1 December; 18:06	(United States) Nike-Apache		(United States) Wallops Island		(United States) NASA	
1 December; 18:06		NASA	Suborbital	Ionospheric	1 December	Successful
1 December; 18:06	Apogee: 169 kilometres (105 mi)					
1 December; 20:34:00	(United States) Nike-Apache		(United States) Wallops Island		(United States) NASA	
1 December; 20:34:00		Michigan	Suborbital	Aeronomy	1 December	Successful
1 December; 20:34:00	Apogee: 131 kilometres (81 mi)					
1 December; 21:25	(United States) Nike-Cajun		(United States) Wallops Island		(United States) NASA	
1 December; 21:25		NASA	Suborbital	Aeronomy	1 December	Successful
1 December; 21:25	Apogee: 126 kilometres (78 mi)					
1 December; 21:34	(United States) Nike-Cajun		(Canada) Churchill		(United States) NASA	
1 December; 21:34		NASA	Suborbital	Aeronomy	1 December	Successful
1 December; 21:34	Apogee: 108 kilometres (67 mi)					
1 December; 23:20	(United States) Nike-Apache		(United States) Eglin		(United States) NASA	
1 December; 23:20		AFCRL	Suborbital	Aeronomy	1 December	Successful
1 December; 23:20	Apogee: 222 kilometres (138 mi)					
1 December	(France) Centaure		(Algeria) Hammaguira Bacchus		(France) CNES	
1 December		CNRS	Suborbital	Aeronomy	1 December	Launch failure
3 December; 23:20	(United States) Nike-Apache		(United States) Eglin		(United States) NASA; AFCRL	
3 December; 23:20		AFCRL	Suborbital	Aeronomy	3 December	Successful
3 December; 23:20	Apogee: 222 kilometres (138 mi)					
4 December; 00:01	(United States) Honest John-Nike-Nike		(United States) Eglin		(United States) US Air Force	
4 December; 00:01		AFCRL	Suborbital	Aeronomy; Ionospheric	4 December	Successful
4 December; 00:01	Apogee: 140 kilometres (87 mi)					
4 December; 03:45	(United States) Nike-Apache		(United States) Eglin		(United States) US Air Force	
4 December; 03:45		AFCRL	Suborbital	Aeronomy	4 December	Successful
4 December; 03:45	Apogee: 135 kilometres (84 mi)					
4 December; 04:45	(United States) Honest John-Nike-Nike		(United States) Eglin		(United States) US Air Force	
4 December; 04:45		AFCRL	Suborbital	Aeronomy	4 December	Successful
4 December; 04:45	Apogee: 115 kilometres (71 mi)					
4 December; 07:06	(United States) Nike-Cajun		(Canada) Churchill		(United States) NASA	
4 December; 07:06		NASA	Suborbital	Aeronomy	4 December	Successful
4 December; 07:06	Apogee: 114 kilometres (71 mi)					
4 December; 07:56	(United Kingdom) Skylark-5		(Australia) Woomera LA-2		(United Kingdom) RAE	
4 December; 07:56		UCL	Suborbital	Aeronomy	4 December	Successful
4 December; 07:56	Apogee: 105 kilometres (65 mi)					
4 December; 10:28	(United States) HAD		(Australia) Woomera LA-2		(Australia) WRE	
4 December; 10:28		WRE	Suborbital	Aeronomy	4 December	Successful
4 December; 10:28	Apogee: 113 kilometres (70 mi)					
4 December	(France) Centaure		(Algeria) Hammaguira		(France) CNES	
4 December		CNRS	Suborbital	Aeronomy	4 December	Successful
4 December	Apogee: 130 kilometres (81 mi)					
5 December; 01:51	(United States) Honest John-Nike-Nike		(United States) Eglin		(United States) US Air Force	
5 December; 01:51		AFCRL	Suborbital	Aeronomy	5 December	Successful
5 December; 01:51	Apogee: 150 kilometres (93 mi)					
5 December; 21:25	(United States) SM-65F Atlas		(United States) Cape Canaveral LC-11		(United States) US Air Force	
5 December; 21:25		US Air Force	Suborbital	Missile test	5 December	Successful
5 December; 21:25	Apogee: 1,400 kilometres (870 mi)					
5 December	(France) Dragon		(Algeria) Hammaguira Bacchus		(France) CNES	
5 December		DMA	Suborbital	Test flight	5 December	Launch failure
5 December	Apogee: 80 kilometres (50 mi)					
5 December	(United States) HGM-25A Titan I		(United States) Vandenberg LC-395A-1			
5 December			Suborbital	Missile test	5 December	Successful
5 December	Apogee: 1,000 kilometres (620 mi)					
6 December; 00:00	(United States) Nike-Cajun		(United States) Wallops Island		(United States) NASA	
6 December; 00:00		GCA	Suborbital	Ionospheric	6 December	Successful
6 December; 00:00	Apogee: 128 kilometres (80 mi)					
6 December; 00:16	(United States) Nike-Apache		(United States) Wallops Island		(United States) NASA	
6 December; 00:16		GCA	Suborbital	Aeronomy	6 December	Successful
6 December; 00:16	Apogee: 100 kilometres (62 mi)					
6 December; 05:32	(United States) Nike-Cajun		(United States) Wallops Island		(United States) NASA	
6 December; 05:32		NASA	Suborbital	Aeronomy	6 December	Successful
6 December; 05:32	Apogee: 119 kilometres (74 mi)					
6 December; 05:43	(United States) Nike-Cajun		(Canada) Churchill		(United States) NASA	
6 December; 05:43		NASA	Suborbital	Aeronomy	6 December	Successful
6 December; 05:43	Apogee: 122 kilometres (76 mi)					
6 December; 14:19:04	(United States) UGM-27 Polaris A3		(United States) Cape Canaveral LC-29A		(United States) US Navy	
6 December; 14:19:04		US Navy	Suborbital	Missile test	6 December	Launch failure
6 December; 14:19:04	Apogee: 50 kilometres (31 mi)					
6 December; 20:31:37	(United States) LGM-25C Titan II		(United States) Cape Canaveral LC-16		(United States) US Air Force	
6 December; 20:31:37		US Air Force	Suborbital	Missile test	6 December	Launch failure
6 December; 20:31:37	Apogee: 500 kilometres (310 mi)					
6 December	(Soviet Union) R-12 Dvina		(Soviet Union) Makat		(Soviet Union) MVS	
6 December		MVS	Suborbital	Missile test	6 December	Successful
6 December	Apogee: 402 kilometres (250 mi)					
7 December; 15:00:01	(United States) LGM-30B Minuteman IB		(United States) Cape Canaveral LC-32B		(United States) US Air Force	
7 December; 15:00:01		US Air Force	Suborbital	Missile test	7 December	Successful
7 December; 15:00:01	Apogee: 1,300 kilometres (810 mi)					
7 December	(Soviet Union) R-12 Dvina		(Soviet Union) Kapustin Yar		(Soviet Union) MVS	
7 December		MVS	Suborbital	Missile test	7 December	Successful
7 December	Apogee: 402 kilometres (250 mi)					
7 December			(Soviet Union) Kapustin Yar		(Soviet Union) MVS	
7 December		MVS	Suborbital	Missile test	7 December	Successful
7 December	Apogee: 200 kilometres (120 mi)					
7 December			(Soviet Union) Kapustin Yar		(Soviet Union) MVS	
7 December		MVS	Suborbital	Missile test	7 December	Successful
7 December	Apogee: 200 kilometres (120 mi)					
8 December; 01:08	(United States) Aerobee-150 (Hi)		(United States) Eglin		(United States) US Air Force	
8 December; 01:08		AFCRL	Suborbital	Aeronomy	8 December	Successful
8 December; 01:08	Apogee: 220 kilometres (140 mi)					
8 December	(France) Centaure		(Argentina) CELPA		(France) CNES	
8 December		CNRS	Suborbital	Aeronomy	8 December	Successful
8 December	Apogee: 130 kilometres (81 mi)					
9 December	(France) Centaure		(Argentina) CELPA		(France) CNES	
9 December		CNRS	Suborbital	Aeronomy	9 December	Successful
9 December	Apogee: 130 kilometres (81 mi)					
10 December; 02:55:29	(United States) MGM-31 Pershing I		(United States) Cape Canaveral LC-30A		(United States) US Army	
10 December; 02:55:29		US Army	Suborbital	Missile test	10 December	Successful
10 December; 02:55:29	Apogee: 250 kilometres (160 mi)					
10 December; 20:00	(United States) LGM-30A Minuteman IA		(United States) Vandenberg LC-394A-4		(United States) US Air Force	
10 December; 20:00		US Air Force	Suborbital	Missile test	10 December	Launch failure
10 December; 20:00	Apogee: 20 kilometres (12 mi)					
11 December; 01:30	(United States) Nike-Cajun		(United States) Eglin		(United States) US Air Force	
11 December; 01:30		AFCRL	Suborbital	Aeronomy	11 December	Successful
11 December; 01:30	Apogee: 108 kilometres (67 mi)					
11 December; 03:27	(United States) Nike-Cajun		(Norway) Andøya		(Norway) NTNF	
11 December; 03:27		ILC	Suborbital	Ionospheric	11 December	Successful
11 December; 03:27	Apogee: 121 kilometres (75 mi)					
11 December; 04:22	(United States) Aerobee-150A		(United States) Wallops Island		(United States) NASA	
11 December; 04:22		CSIRO	Suborbital	Ionospheric	11 December	Launch failure
11 December; 04:22	Apogee: 52 kilometres (32 mi)					
11 December	(United States) Nike-Cajun		(Italy) Salto di Quirra		(Italy) CRA	
11 December		ROSAP	Suborbital	Aeronomy	11 December	Successful
11 December	Apogee: 100 kilometres (62 mi)					
11 December	(Soviet Union) R-12 Dvina		(Soviet Union) Makat		(Soviet Union) MVS	
11 December		MVS	Suborbital	Missile test	11 December	Successful
11 December	Apogee: 402 kilometres (250 mi)					
12 December; 11:38:03	(United States) SM-65D Atlas		(United States) Vandenberg LC-576A-3		(United States) US Air Force	
12 December; 11:38:03		US Air Force	Suborbital	Target	12 December	Successful
12 December; 11:38:03	Apogee: 1,800 kilometres (1,100 mi)					
12 December; 12:10	(United States) Nike-Zeus 3		(United States) Kwajalein		(United States) US Army	
12 December; 12:10		US Army	Suborbital	Missile test	12 December	Successful
12 December; 12:10	Apogee: 200 kilometres (120 mi)					
12 December; 12:10	(United States) Nike-Zeus 3		(United States) Kwajalein		(United States) US Army	
12 December; 12:10		US Army	Suborbital	Missile test	12 December	Launch failure
12 December; 12:10	Apogee: 10 kilometres (6.2 mi)					
12 December; 23:46	(United States) Honest John-Nike-Nike		(United States) Eglin		(United States) US Air Force	
12 December; 23:46		AFCRL	Suborbital	Aeronomy	12 December	Successful
12 December; 23:46	Apogee: 101 kilometres (63 mi)					
12 December	(Soviet Union) R-16U		(Soviet Union) Baikonur Site 41/4		(Soviet Union) RVSN	
12 December		RVSN	Suborbital	Missile test	12 December	Successful
12 December	Apogee: 1,210 kilometres (750 mi)					
12 December	(France) Centaure		(France) CERES		(France) CNES	
12 December		CNRS	Suborbital	Aeronomy	12 December	Successful
12 December	Apogee: 130 kilometres (81 mi)					
12 December	(France) Centaure		(France) CERES		(France) CNES	
12 December		CNRS	Suborbital	Aeronomy	12 December	Successful
12 December	Apogee: 130 kilometres (81 mi)					
13 December; 17:23	(United States) Aerobee-150A		(United States) Wallops Island		(United States) NASA	
13 December; 17:23		Johns Hopkins	Suborbital	Aeronomy	13 December	Launch failure
13 December	(Soviet Union) R-16U		(Soviet Union) Baikonur Site 41/4		(Soviet Union) RVSN	
13 December		RVSN	Suborbital	Missile test	13 December	Successful
13 December	Apogee: 1,210 kilometres (750 mi)					
13 December	(United States) Terrier-Asp IV		(United States) Point Arguello LC-B		(United States) US Navy	
13 December		NOTS	Suborbital	Test flight	13 December	
13 December	Apogee: 150 kilometres (93 mi)					
14 December; 20:52	(United States) Nike-Cajun		(Norway) Andøya		(Norway) NTNF	
14 December; 20:52		ILC	Suborbital	Ionospheric	14 December	Successful
14 December; 20:52	Apogee: 123 kilometres (76 mi), first Norwegian spaceflight					
14 December	(Soviet Union) R-12 Dvina		(Soviet Union) Makat		(Soviet Union) MVS	
14 December		MVS	Suborbital	Missile test	14 December	Successful
14 December	Apogee: 402 kilometres (250 mi)					
15 December; 03:00:10	(United States) LGM-30B Minuteman IB		(United States) Cape Canaveral LC-31B		(United States) US Air Force	
15 December; 03:00:10		US Air Force	Suborbital	Missile test	15 December	Successful
15 December; 03:00:10	Apogee: 1,300 kilometres (810 mi)					
15 December; 17:30	(United States) Aerobee-150 (Hi)		(United States) Eglin		(United States) US Air Force	
15 December; 17:30		AFCRL	Suborbital	Ionospheric	15 December	Successful
15 December; 17:30	Apogee: 222 kilometres (138 mi)					
17 December	(United States) Nike-Zeus 3		(United States) White Sands LC-38		(United States) US Army	
17 December		US Army	Suborbital	ASAT test	17 December	Successful
17 December	Apogee: 180 kilometres (110 mi)					
17 December	(Soviet Union) R-16U		(Soviet Union) Baikonur Site 41/4		(Soviet Union) RVSN	
17 December		RVSN	Suborbital	Missile test	17 December	Successful
17 December	Apogee: 1,210 kilometres (750 mi)					
18 December; 05:03	(Japan) Kappa-8		(Japan) Kagoshima		(Japan) ISAS	
18 December; 05:03		TAO	Suborbital	Cosmic ray research	18 December	Successful
18 December; 05:03	Apogee: 202 kilometres (126 mi)					
18 December; 17:26:55	(United States) SM-65E Atlas		(United States) Vandenberg OSTF-1		(United States) US Air Force	
18 December; 17:26:55		US Air Force	Suborbital	ABM test	18 December	Launch failure
18 December; 17:26:55	Apogee: 10 kilometres (6.2 mi)					
18 December; 19:45	(United States) Aerobee-150 (Hi)		(United States) White Sands LC-35		(United States) US Air Force	
18 December; 19:45		US Air Force	Suborbital	Solar	18 December	Successful
18 December; 19:45	Apogee: 224 kilometres (139 mi)					
19 December; 07:33:44	(United States) UGM-27 Polaris A2		(United States) Cape Canaveral LC-25A		(United States) US Navy	
19 December; 07:33:44		US Navy	Suborbital	Missile test	19 December	Successful
19 December; 07:33:44	Apogee: 1,000 kilometres (620 mi)					
19 December; 20:08:28	(United States) LGM-25C Titan II		(United States) Cape Canaveral LC-15		(United States) US Air Force	
19 December; 20:08:28		US Air Force	Suborbital	Missile test	19 December	Successful
19 December; 20:08:28	Apogee: 1,300 kilometres (810 mi)					
19 December; 21:51	(United States) Nike-Zeus 3		(United States) Point Mugu		(United States) US Army	
19 December; 21:51		US Army	Suborbital	Missile test	19 December	Successful
19 December; 21:51	Apogee: 200 kilometres (120 mi)					
19 December	(Soviet Union) R-12 Dvina		(Soviet Union) Makat		(Soviet Union) MVS	
19 December		MVS	Suborbital	Missile test	19 December	Successful
19 December	Apogee: 402 kilometres (250 mi)					
19 December	(United States) Blue Scout Junior SLV-1B		(United States) Point Arguello LC-A		(United States) US Air Force	
19 December	(United States) Ion Engine Test A	EOS; WPAT	Suborbital	Technology	19 December	Spacecraft failure
19 December	Apogee: 2,000 kilometres (1,200 mi), maiden flight of Blue Scout Junior SLV-1B, spacecraft power supply failed					
21 December; 00:35:15	(United States) LGM-30A Minuteman IA		(United States) Cape Canaveral LC-32B		(United States) US Air Force	
21 December; 00:35:15		US Air Force	Suborbital	Missile test	21 December	Launch failure
21 December; 00:35:15	Apogee: 50 kilometres (31 mi)					
21 December	(Soviet Union) R-12 Dvina		(Soviet Union) Makat		(Soviet Union) MVS	
21 December		MVS	Suborbital	Missile test	21 December	Successful
21 December	Apogee: 402 kilometres (250 mi)					
22 December; 09:29:26	(United States) SM-65D Atlas		(United States) Vandenberg LC-576A-1		(United States) Strategic Air Command	
22 December; 09:29:26		AFCRL	Suborbital	ABM Test	22 December	Successful
22 December; 09:29:26	Apogee: 2,259 kilometres (1,404 mi)					
22 December; 10:00	(United States) Nike-Zeus 3		(United States) Kwajalein		(United States) US Army	
22 December; 10:00		US Army	Suborbital	Missile test	22 December	Successful
22 December; 10:00	Apogee: 200 kilometres (120 mi)					
22 December; 10:00	(United States) Nike-Zeus 3		(United States) Kwajalein		(United States) US Army	
22 December; 10:00		US Army	Suborbital	Missile test	22 December	Launch failure
22 December; 10:00	Apogee: 10 kilometres (6.2 mi)					
22 December; 14:15	(United States) GAM-87A Skybolt		(United States) B-52, AMR		(United States) US Air Force	
22 December; 14:15		US Air Force	Suborbital	Missile test	22 December	
22 December; 14:15	Apogee: 580 kilometres (360 mi)					
25 December	(Soviet Union) R-12 Dvina		(Soviet Union) Makat		(Soviet Union) MVS	
25 December		MVS	Suborbital	Missile test	25 December	Successful
25 December	Apogee: 402 kilometres (250 mi)					
25 December	(Soviet Union) R-14 Usovaya		(Soviet Union) Kapustin Yar		(Soviet Union) RVSN	
25 December		RVSN	Suborbital	Missile test	25 December	Successful
25 December	Apogee: 675 kilometres (419 mi)					
27 December	(Soviet Union) R-12 Dvina		(Soviet Union) Kapustin Yar		(Soviet Union) MVS	
27 December		MVS	Suborbital	Missile test	27 December	Successful
27 December	Apogee: 402 kilometres (250 mi)					
29 December	(Soviet Union) R-12 Dvina		(Soviet Union) Kapustin Yar		(Soviet Union) MVS	
29 December		MVS	Suborbital	Missile test	29 December	Successful
29 December	Apogee: 402 kilometres (250 mi)					
December	(Soviet Union) R-14 Usovaya		(Soviet Union) Kapustin Yar		(Soviet Union) RVSN	
December		RVSN	Suborbital	Missile test	December	Successful
December	Apogee: 675 kilometres (419 mi)					
December	(United States) Nike-Apache		(United States) White Sands		(United States) US Army	
December		US Army	Suborbital	REV Test	December	Successful
December	Apogee: 100 kilometres (62 mi)					
December	(United States) Nike-Apache		(United States) White Sands		(United States) US Army	
December		US Army	Suborbital	REV Test	December	Successful
December	Apogee: 100 kilometres (62 mi)					
December	(United States) Nike-Apache		(United States) White Sands		(United States) US Army	
December		US Army	Suborbital	REV Test	December	Successful
December	Apogee: 100 kilometres (62 mi)					
4th Quarter	(United States) UGM-27 Polaris A2		(United States) USS Ethan Allen, WTR		(United States) US Navy	
4th Quarter		US Navy	Suborbital	Missile test	4th Quarter	Successful
4th Quarter	Apogee: 1,000 kilometres (620 mi)					
4th Quarter	(United States) UGM-27 Polaris A2		(United States) USS Ethan Allen, WTR		(United States) US Navy	
4th Quarter		US Navy	Suborbital	Missile test	4th Quarter	Successful
4th Quarter	Apogee: 1,000 kilometres (620 mi)					
4th Quarter	(United States) UGM-27 Polaris A2		(United States) USS Ethan Allen, WTR		(United States) US Navy	
4th Quarter		US Navy	Suborbital	Missile test	4th Quarter	Successful
4th Quarter	Apogee: 1,000 kilometres (620 mi)					
4th Quarter	(United States) UGM-27 Polaris A2		(United States) USS Ethan Allen, WTR		(United States) US Navy	
4th Quarter		US Navy	Suborbital	Missile test	4th Quarter	Successful
4th Quarter	Apogee: 1,000 kilometres (620 mi)					
Unknown	(United States) Nike-Zeus 3		(United States) Point Mugu		(United States) US Army	
Unknown		US Army	Suborbital	Missile test	Unknown	Successful
Unknown	Apogee: 150 kilometres (93 mi)					

- ← Jan
- Feb
- Mar
- Apr
- May
- Jun
- Jul
- Aug
- Sep
- Oct
- Nov
- Dec →
