= Kosmos 10 =

Soviet reconnaissance satellite (Zenit 2-6)

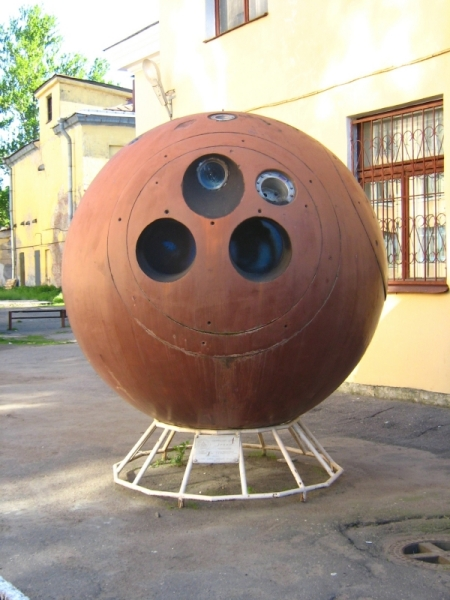
- A Zenit reentry capsule
- Names: Zenit 2-6
- Mission type: Optical imaging reconnaissance Radiation
- Operator: Soviet space program
- Harvard designation: 1962 Beta Zeta 1
- COSPAR ID: 1962-054A
- SATCAT no.: 437
- Mission duration: 4 days

Spacecraft properties
- Spacecraft type: Zenit-2
- Manufacturer: OKB-1
- Launch mass: 4610 kg

Start of mission
- Launch date: 17 October 1962; 09:21:00 GMT
- Rocket: Vostok-2
- Launch site: Baikonur 1/5
- Contractor: OKB-1

End of mission
- Disposal: Recovered
- Landing date: 21 October 1962
- Landing site: Steppe in Kazakhstan

Orbital parameters
- Reference system: Geocentric
- Regime: Low Earth
- Perigee altitude: 197 km
- Apogee altitude: 367 km
- Inclination: 65.0°
- Period: 90.2 minutes
- Epoch: 17 October 1962

Kosmos 10 (Russian: Космос 10 meaning Cosmos 10), also known as Zenit-2 No.6, was a Soviet reconnaissance satellite launched in 1962. It was the tenth satellite to be designated under the Kosmos system, and the fourth successful launch of a Soviet reconnaissance satellite, following Kosmos 4, Kosmos 7 and Kosmos 9.

== Spacecraft ==
Kosmos 10 was a Zenit-2 satellite, a first generation, low resolution, reconnaissance satellite derived from the Vostok spacecraft used for crewed flights, the satellites were developed by OKB-1. In addition to reconnaissance, it was also used for research into radiation in support of the Vostok programme. It had a mass of 4,610 kilograms (10,160 lb).

== Mission ==
The Vostok-2, s/n T15000-03, was used to launch Kosmos 10. The launch was conducted from Site 1/5 at the Baikonur Cosmodrome, and occurred at 09:21 GMT on 21 October 1962. Kosmos 10 was placed into a low Earth orbit with a perigee of 197 kilometres (122 mi), an apogee of 367 kilometres (228 mi), an inclination of 65.0°, and an orbital period of 90.2 minutes. It conducted a four-day mission, before being deorbited and landing by parachute on 21 October 1962, and recovered by the Soviet forces in the steppe in Kazakhstan.

It was the last four-day test flight of the Zenit-2 programme, before the system became fully operational and began making eight-day full-duration flights from the next mission, Kosmos 12.

== See also ==
- 1962 in spaceflight
