= Kosmos 9 =

Soviet reconnaissance satellite (Zenit 2-5)

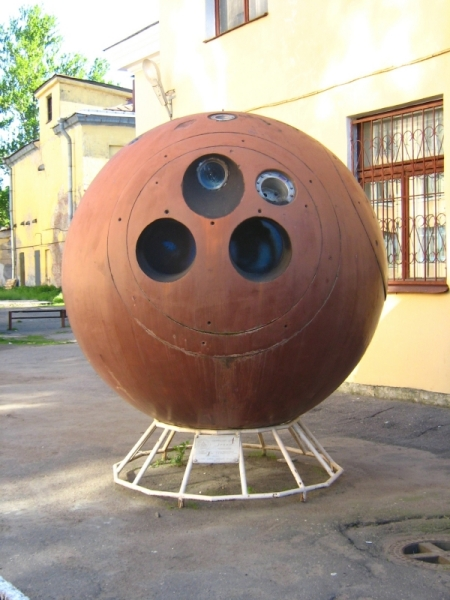
- A Zenit reentry capsule
- Names: Zenit 2-5
- Mission type: Optical imaging reconnaissance Radiation
- Harvard designation: 1962 Alpha Omega 1
- COSPAR ID: 1962-048A
- SATCAT no.: 422
- Mission duration: 4 days

Spacecraft properties
- Spacecraft type: Zenit-2
- Manufacturer: OKB-1
- Launch mass: 4610 kg

Start of mission
- Launch date: 27 September 1962; 09:39:51 GMT
- Rocket: Vostok-2
- Launch site: Baikonur 1/5
- Contractor: OKB-1

End of mission
- Disposal: Recovered
- Landing date: 1 October 1962
- Landing site: Steppe in Kazakhstan

Orbital parameters
- Reference system: Geocentric
- Regime: Low Earth
- Perigee altitude: 292 km
- Apogee altitude: 346 km
- Inclination: 65.0°
- Period: 90.9 minutes
- Epoch: 27 September 1962

Kosmos 9 (Russian: Космос 9 meaning Cosmos 9), also known as Zenit-2 No.5, was a Soviet reconnaissance satellite launched in 1962. It was the ninth satellite to be designated under the Kosmos system, and the third successful launch of a Soviet reconnaissance satellite, following Kosmos 4 and Kosmos 7.

== Spacecraft ==
Kosmos 9 was a Zenit-2 satellite, a first generation, low resolution photo reconnaissance payload. A reconnaissance satellite derived from the Vostok spacecraft used for crewed flights. In addition to reconnaissance, it was also used for research into radiation in support of the Vostok programme. It had a mass of 4,610 kilograms (10,160 lb).

== Mission ==
The Vostok-2, s/n T15000-06, was used to launch Kosmos 9. The launch was conducted from Site 1/5 at the Baikonur Cosmodrome, and occurred at 09:39:51 GMT on 27 September 1962. Kosmos 9 was placed into a low Earth orbit with a perigee of 292 kilometres (181 mi), an apogee of 346 kilometres (215 mi), an inclination of 65.0°, and an orbital period of 90.9 minutes. It conducted a four-day mission, before being deorbited and landing by parachute on 1 October 1962, and recovered by the Soviet forces in the steppe in Kazakhstan.

The following Zenit-2 launch was Kosmos 10.

== See also ==
- 1962 in spaceflight
