= Explorer 26 =

NASA satellite of the Explorer program

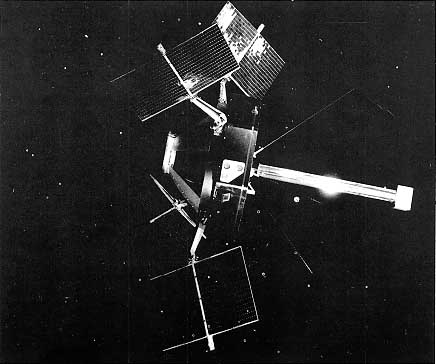
- Explorer 26 satellite
- Names: EPE-D; NASA S-3C
- Mission type: Space physics
- Operator: NASA
- COSPAR ID: 1964-086A
- SATCAT no.: 00963
- Mission duration: 12 months (planned); 56 years, 8 months and 1 day (achieved)

Spacecraft properties
- Spacecraft: Explorer XXVI
- Bus: S3
- Manufacturer: Goddard Space Flight Center
- Launch mass: 45.8 kg (101 lb)
- Power: 4 deployable solar arrays and batteries

Start of mission
- Launch date: 21 December 1964, 09:00:03 GMT
- Rocket: Thor-Delta C (Thor 393 / Delta 027)
- Launch site: Cape Canaveral, LC-17A
- Contractor: Douglas Aircraft Company
- Entered service: 21 December 1964

End of mission
- Last contact: 26 May 1967
- Decay date: 23 August 2021

Orbital parameters
- Reference system: Geocentric orbit
- Regime: Highly elliptical orbit
- Perigee altitude: 171 km (106 mi)
- Apogee altitude: 8,545 km (5,310 mi)
- Inclination: 18.10°
- Period: 184.50 minutes

Instruments
- Fluxgate Magnetometers; Omnidirectional and Unidirectional Electron and Proton Fluxes; Proton-Electron Scintillation Detector; Solar Cell Damage; Solid-State Electron Detector

Explorer 26 was a NASA satellite launched on 21 December 1964, as part of NASA's Explorer program. Its primary mission was to study the Earth's magnetic field.

== Spacecraft ==
Explorer 26 was a spin-stabilized, solar-cell-powered spacecraft instrumented to measure trapped particles and the geomagnetic field and weighing 45.8 kg (101 lb).

== Experiments ==
It carried five experiments: Solid-State Electron Detector, Omnidirectional and Unidirectional Electron and Proton Fluxes, Fluxgate Magnetometers, Proton-Electron Scintillation Detector, and Solar Cell Damage. The Solar Cell Damage experiment was intended to quantify the degradation of solar cell performance due to radiation, and evaluate the effectiveness of glass shields at preventing this degradation. A 16-channel PFM/PM time-division multiplexed telemeter was used. The time required to sample the 16 channels (one frame period) was 0.29 seconds. Half of the channels were used to convey eight-level digital information. The other channels were used for analog information. During ground processing, the analog information was digitized with an accuracy of 1/800th of full scale. One analog channel was subcommutated in a 16-frame-long pattern and used to telemeter spacecraft temperatures, power system voltages, currents, etc. A digital solar aspect sensor measured the spin period and phase, digitized to 0.036 seconds, and the angle between the spin axis and Sun direction to about 3° intervals.

=== Fluxgate Magnetometers ===
The purpose of this experiment was to measure the magnitude and direction of the Earth's magnetic field over the spacecraft orbit. Three orthogonal components were measured by a boom-mounted biaxial magnetometer during each spacecraft revolution. Each axis had a range of plus and minus 2000 nT and an accuracy of 5 nT. The sampling rate was 3.13 Hz. The experiment provided useful data from launch until 30 June 1965, after which spacecraft tumble rendered field direction determination impractical.

=== Omnidirectional and Unidirectional Electron and Proton Fluxes ===
Omnidirectional fluxes of 40- to 110-MeV protons and of electrons greater than about 4 MeV were separably measured by a plastic scintillator. A second plastic scintillator with an 8° half-angle aperture and a look direction perpendicular to the spacecraft spin axis separably measured protons above 5.2 MeV and electrons above 0.5 MeV. The ability to distinguish between the particle types was due to the presence of two discrimination levels associated with each detector. High-quality data transmission from this experiment was essentially continuous from launch until about the middle of 1966, and then intermittent.

=== Proton-Electron Scintillation Detector ===
This experiment was designed to measure the directional fluxes and spectra of low-energy trapped and auroral protons and electrons. It employed a 5-mg-thick powder phosphor scintillator with a 1000-A aluminum coating. Additional absorbers were inserted in the detector aperture by a 16-position stepped wheel. The aperture was pointed at 45° to the spin axis. Due to the thinness and type of phosphor, the detector in the pulse mode would respond only to low-energy ions, and, therefore, essentially measured the flux of protons that penetrated the absorbers and stopped in the phosphor. Both the pulse counting rate and the phototube current were telemetered once each frame period. Sixteen readings were telemetered in each wheel position, and thus one complete set of data was obtained every 256 frames (one wheel revolution = 80 s). Protons in seven energy ranges were measured. The high-energy limit was about 10 MeV for all ranges, and the low-energy cutoffs were 97, 125, 168, 295, 495, 970, and 1700 keV. The energy fluxes of electrons in three ranges were measured separately using scatter geometry, absorbers, and the phototube current. The low-energy cutoffs were 17, 33, and 75 keV, and the high-energy cutoff was about 100 keV for all three ranges.

=== Solid-State Electron Detector ===
Trapped electrons and protons in the earth's Van Allen belts were measured using a combination of six omnidirectional and directional solid-state particle detectors (silicon p-n junctions). Electrons were analyzed in the energy ranges E>1 MeV, E>3.5 MeV, and E>2.5 MeV with the three omnidirectional detectors (E1, E2, E3), and in the ranges E>0.3 MeV, E>0.45 MeV, and E>1.7 MeV with the three directional detectors (E5, E6, E7). Protons were analyzed in the energy ranges E>10 MeV, E>27 MeV, and E>21 MeV with the omnidirectional detectors, and in the ranges E>1.5 MeV, E>5.0 MeV, and E>16 MeV with the directional detectors. Species discrimination was not always possible. Omnidirectional data were accumulated and telemetered every 1.43 s. Directional data were accumulated for 0.145 s and telemetered every 0.29 s. The spacecraft spin period increased from 0.03 min to 0.5 min during the spacecraft life. Proton data were primarily useful in identifying proton contamination of electron counting rates. The instrument behaved well throughout the spacecraft life.

== Launch ==
Explorer 26 was launched from Cape Canaveral (CCAFS) at Cape Canaveral Space Launch Complex 17 (LC-17A) on a Thor-Delta C launch vehicle on 21 December 1964 at 09:00:03 GMT.

== Mission ==
The spacecraft systems functioned well, except for some undervoltage turnoffs, until 26 May 1967, when the telemeter failed. The initial spin rate was 33 rpm, and the spin axis direction was right ascension 272.8° and declination 21.5°. The spin rate decreased with time to 2 rpm on 9 September 1965. For the balance of its life, the spacecraft was coning or tumbling at a rate of about 1 rpm.

== Re-entry ==
Some sources erroneously record Explorer 26 as having decayed from orbit in 1978, a conclusion reached by early decay rate projections. Based on continued satellite tracking data, Explorer 26 was confirmed to have decayed from orbit on 23 August 2021 after over 56 years in orbit. NASA's S-3C scientific satellite, the Energetic Particles Explorer-D, named Explorer 26 after launch was launched on 21 December 1964 into an elliptical 310 x 26200 km x 20.1° orbit and operated for 2.4 years. SATCAT number 00963, it reentered on 23 August 2021 after 56.7 years in space.

== See also ==
- Explorer program
- Explorer 15
