= Explorer 14 =

NASA satellite of the Explorer program

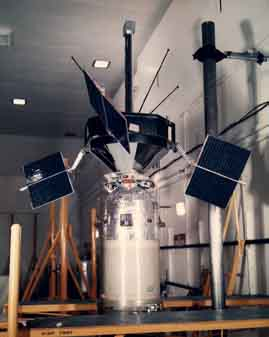
- Explorer 14 satellite
- Names: EPE-B; Energetic Particles Explorer-B; NASA S-3A
- Mission type: Space physics
- Operator: NASA
- Harvard designation: 1962 Beta Gamma 1
- COSPAR ID: 1962-051A
- SATCAT no.: 00432
- Mission duration: 12 months (planned); 10 months (achieved)

Spacecraft properties
- Spacecraft: Explorer XIV
- Spacecraft type: Energetic Particles Explorer
- Bus: S-3
- Manufacturer: Goddard Space Flight Center
- Launch mass: 40 kg (88 lb)
- Power: 4 deployable solar arrays and batteries

Start of mission
- Launch date: 2 October 1962, 22:11:30 GMT
- Rocket: Thor-Delta A (Thor 345 / Delta 013)
- Launch site: Cape Canaveral, LC-17B
- Contractor: Douglas Aircraft Company
- Entered service: 2 October 1962

End of mission
- Last contact: 11 August 1963
- Decay date: 25 May 1988

Orbital parameters
- Reference system: Geocentric orbit
- Regime: Highly elliptical orbit
- Perigee altitude: 2,601 km (1,616 mi)
- Apogee altitude: 96,189 km (59,769 mi)
- Inclination: 42.80°
- Period: 2184.60 minutes

Instruments
- Cosmic Rays; Electrolytic Timer Experiment; Fluxgate Magnetometers; Proton Analyzer; Proton-Electron Scintillation Detector; Solar Aspect Sensor; Solar Cell Damage Experiment; Trapped Particle Radiation

Explorer 14, also called EPE-B or Energetic Particles Explorer-B, was a NASA spacecraft instrumented to measure cosmic-ray particles, trapped particles, solar wind protons, and magnetospheric and interplanetary magnetic fields. It was the second of the S-3 series of spacecraft, which also included Explorer 12, 14, 15, and 26. It was launched on 2 October 1962, aboard a Thor-Delta launch vehicle.

== Spacecraft ==
The spacecraft weighed 40 kg (88 lb). Explorer 14 was a spin-stabilized, solar-cell-powered spacecraft instrumented to measure cosmic-ray particles, trapped particles, solar wind protons, and magnetospheric and interplanetary magnetic fields.

== Instruments ==
Explorer 14 was designed to study space physics, and so had a multitude of instruments including a cosmic-ray detector, a particle trapper, and a magnetometer. Its instrumentation included 10 particle detection systems for the measurement of protons and electrons and their relation to magnetic fields, a solar cell damage experiment, optical aspect sensor and one transmitter. A 16-channel PFM / PM time-division multiplexed telemeter was used. The time required to sample the 16 channels (one frame period) was 0.324 seconds. Half of the channels were used to convey eight-level digital information, and the other channels were used for analog information. During ground processing of the telemetered data, the analog information was digitized with an accuracy of 1/100 of full scale. One analog channel was subcommutated in a 16-frame-long pattern and was used to telemeter spacecraft temperatures, power system voltages, currents, etc. A digital solar aspect sensor measured the spin period and phase, digitized to 0.041 seconds, and the angle between the spin axis and Sun direction to about 3° intervals. Good data was recorded for 85% of the mission.

== Experiments ==
There were eight experiments done on the Explorer 14 during its mission:

- Cosmic Rays
- Electrolytic Timer Experiment
- Fluxgate Magnetometers
- Proton Analyzer
- Proton-Electron Scintillation Detector
- Solar Aspect Sensor
- Solar Cell Damage Experiment
- Trapped Particle Radiation

=== Cosmic Rays ===
The instrumentation for the cosmic-ray experiment consisted of (1) a double scintillation counter telescope that measured 55- to 500-MeV protons in six energy intervals and protons above 600 MeV, (2) a single scintillator that measured 1.4- to 22-MeV protons at five energy thresholds and electrons above 150 keV, and (3) a Geiger-Müller counter telescope that measured proton fluxes above 30 MeV. A complete set of measurements was made every 6.3 minutes. The experiment worked throughout the useful life of the spacecraft.

=== Fluxgate Magnetometers ===
This experiment was designed to measure the magnitude and direction of the Earth's magnetic field between 3 and 13 Earth radii. It consisted of three orthogonal fluxgate magnetometers mounted on the end of an 86.4 cm (34.0 in) boom. One magnetometer axis was within 2° of the spacecraft spin axis. Each of the three sensors had a range of -500 to +500 nT with a sensitivity of 1 nT. The three components of the magnetic field were all measured within a 50 ms time period once every 327 ms. An inflight calibration system applied a known magnetic field to each sensor in turn once every 115 seconds.

=== Proton Analyzer ===
This experiment was designed to detect and study the positive ion component of the solar plasma. The instrument consisted of a quadrispherical electrostatic analyzer. During each energy scan, the voltage applied across the analyzer plates logarithmically decreased so that the instrument continuously covered the energy range from 18,000 down to 200 eV-per-unit-charge. This took 170 seconds. The instrument had a fan-shaped angular acceptance for positive ions of 10° by 80° (full width at half maximum). The instrument was located on the lower hemisphere of the spacecraft with the 80° view angle contained in a spacecraft meridian plane. The only useful data were obtained during the 7 October 1962, geomagnetic disturbance.

=== Proton-Electron Scintillation Detector ===
his experiment was designed to measure the directional fluxes and spectra of low-energy trapped and auroral protons and electrons. It employed a 5-mg-thick powder phosphor scintillator covered with a 1000-A aluminum coating. Additional absorbers were inserted in the detector aperture by a 16-position stepped wheel. The aperture was pointed at 45° to the spin axis. Due to the thinness and type of phosphor, the detector in the pulse mode would respond only to low-energy ions, and, therefore, essentially measured the flux of protons that penetrated the absorbers and stopped in the phosphor. Both the pulse counting rate and the phototube current were telemetered once each frame period. Sixteen readings were telemetered in each wheel position, and thus one complete set of data was obtained every 256 frames (one wheel revolution=80 seconds). Protons in seven energy ranges were measured. The high-energy limit was about 10 MeV for all ranges, and the low-energy cutoffs were 97, 125, 168, 295, 495, 970, and 1700 keV. The energy fluxes of electrons in three ranges were measured separately using scatter geometry, absorbers, and the phototube current. The low-energy cutoffs were 13, 21, and 25 keV, and the high-energy cutoff was about 100 keV for all three ranges. The electron measurements worked throughout the life of the satellite. The proton channel slowly became intermittent and by mid-December 1962 was inoperative. Due to the spacecraft coning, it was difficult to obtain the directional intensities.

=== Trapped Particle Radiation ===
The experiment was designed to obtain separately definitive values of the absolute intensities of geomagnetically trapped electrons (E>40 keV and E>230 keV) and protons (E>500 keV) particularly in the outer zone. The experiment used an array of three thin-windowed Anton type 213 directional Geiger-Müller counters. The detectors were oriented perpendicular to the spacecraft spin axis. (The spacecraft had an initial spin period of about 6 seconds on 24 January 1963.) The experiment was also designed to study the physical phenomena near the boundary of the magnetosphere. An omnidirectional 302 Geiger-Müller detector was used to gather data for comparison with measurements obtained with the 302 type Geiger-Müller detectors on earlier satellites. Each detector was sampled for 10.24 seconds, and the accumulated counts were transmitted redundantly every 76.8 seconds. The trapped particles experiment operated satisfactorily until 11 August 1963, when modulation of the telemetry signal ceased.

== Mission ==
The spacecraft functioned well except for the period from 10 to 24 January 1963, and after 11 August 1963, when the encoder malfunctioned terminating the transmission of usable data. Good data were recorded for approximately 85% of the active lifetime of the spacecraft. The spacecraft was coning (37° maximum half-angle) until 10 January 1963. After 24 January 1963, it was spin-stabilized at a rate of 10 rpm. This rate slowly decreased to 1 rpm on 8 July 1963. Initially, the local time of apogee was 07:00 hours.

== See also ==
- Explorer 12
- Explorer 15
- Explorer 26
- Explorer program
