= Kosmos 7 =

Soviet reconnaissance satellite (Zenit 2-4)

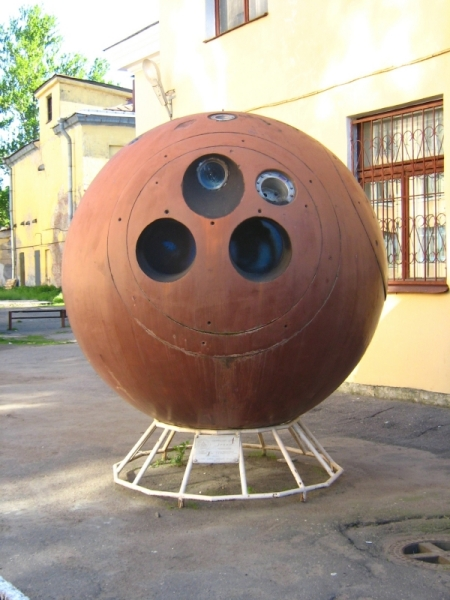
- A Zenit reentry capsule
- Names: Zenit 2-4; Sputnik 17
- Mission type: Optical imaging reconnaissance Radiation
- Operator: Soviet space program
- Harvard designation: 1962 Alpha Iota 1
- COSPAR ID: 1962-033A
- SATCAT no.: 346
- Mission duration: 4 days

Spacecraft properties
- Spacecraft type: Zenit-2
- Manufacturer: OKB-1
- Launch mass: 4610 kg

Start of mission
- Launch date: 28 July 1962, 09:18:31 GMT
- Rocket: Vostok-2
- Launch site: Baikonur Site 1/5
- Contractor: OKB-1

End of mission
- Disposal: Recovered
- Landing date: 1 August 1962
- Landing site: Kazakhstan

Orbital parameters
- Reference system: Geocentric
- Regime: Low Earth
- Perigee altitude: 197 km
- Apogee altitude: 356 km
- Inclination: 64.95°
- Period: 90.1 minutes
- Epoch: 28 July 1962

Kosmos 7 (Russian: Космос 7 meaning Cosmos 7), also known as Zenit-2 No.4 and occasionally in the West as Sputnik 17 was a Soviet reconnaissance satellite launched in 1962. It was the seventh satellite to be designated under the Kosmos system, and the second successful launch of a Soviet reconnaissance satellite.

== Spacecraft ==
Kosmos 7 was a Zenit-2 satellite, a first generation, low resolution reconnaissance satellite derived from the Vostok spacecraft used for crewed flights. It also marked the first successful launch of a Vostok-2, on the second attempt. It had a mass of 4,610 kilograms (10,160 lb). The first Vostok-2 launch, also carrying a Zenit-2 satellite, suffered an engine failure seconds after launch on 1 June 1962, fell back to earth and exploded within 300 metres (980 ft) of the launch pad.

Kosmos 7 was one of a series of Soviet Earth satellites whose purpose was to study outer space, the upper layers of the atmosphere, and the Earth. Scientific data and measurements were relayed to Earth by multichannel telemetry systems equipped with space-borne memory units.

== Mission ==
Vostok-2, s/n T15000-07, was used to launch Kosmos 7. The launch was conducted from Site 1/5 at the Baikonur Cosmodrome, and occurred at 09:18:31 GMT on 28 July 1962. Kosmos 7 was placed into a low Earth orbit with a perigee of 197 kilometres (122 mi), an apogee of 356 kilometres (221 mi), an inclination of 64.95°, and an orbital period of 90.1 minutes. It conducted a four-day mission, before being deorbited and landing by parachute on 1 August 1962, and recovered by the Soviet forces in the steppe in Kazakhstan.

It was the second Zenit-2 to reach orbit, the first being Kosmos 4. The next Zenit-2 launch will be Kosmos 9. In addition to reconnaissance, it was also used for radiation measurements made for safety during the flight of the Vostok 3 and Vostok 4 spacecraft.

== See also ==
- 1962 in spaceflight
