= Explorer 15 =

NASA satellite of the Explorer program

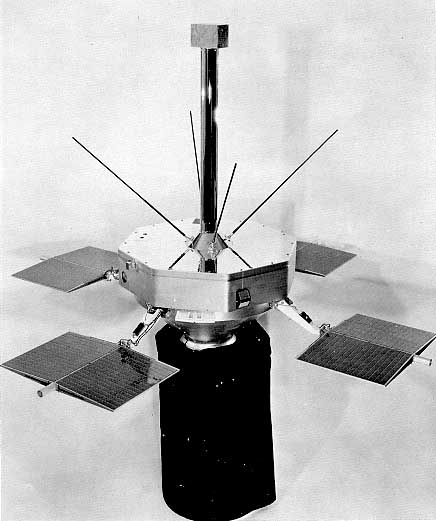
- Explorer 15 satellite
- Names: EPE-C; Energetic Particles Explorer-C; NASA S-3B
- Mission type: Space physics
- Operator: NASA
- Harvard designation: 1962 βλ1
- COSPAR ID: 1962-059A
- SATCAT no.: 00445
- Mission duration: 12 months (planned); 3 months (achieved)

Spacecraft properties
- Spacecraft: Explorer XV
- Spacecraft type: Energetic Particles Explorer
- Bus: S-3
- Manufacturer: Goddard Space Flight Center
- Launch mass: 44.4 kg (98 lb)
- Power: 4 deployable solar arrays and batteries

Start of mission
- Launch date: 27 October 1962, 23:15:01 GMT
- Rocket: Thor-Delta A (Thor 346 / Delta 014)
- Launch site: Cape Canaveral, LC-17B
- Contractor: Douglas Aircraft Company
- Entered service: 27 October 1962

End of mission
- Last contact: 30 January 1963
- Decay date: 19 December 1978

Orbital parameters
- Reference system: Geocentric orbit
- Regime: Highly elliptical orbit
- Perigee altitude: 300 km (190 mi)
- Apogee altitude: 17,438 km (10,835 mi)
- Inclination: 18.0°
- Period: 311.40 minutes

Instruments
- Angular Distribution; Directional and Omnidirectional Energetic Protons and Electrons; Electron and Proton Solid-State Detectors; Fluxgate Magnetometers; Proton-Electron Scintillation Detector

Explorer 15, also called EPE-C or Energetic Particles Explorer-C, was a NASA satellite launched as part of the Explorer program. Explorer 15 was launched on 27 October 1962, at Cape Canaveral Air Force Station, Florida, United States, with a Thor-Delta A .

== Spacecraft ==
Explorer 15 was a spin-stabilized, solar cell-powered spacecraft instrumented to study the artificial radiation belt produced by the Starfish high-altitude nuclear burst of July 1962. The backup payload for Explorer 14 was modified and used for Explorer 15.

== Instruments ==
The instrumentation included three sets of particle detectors to study both electrons and protons, and a two-axis fluxgate magnetometers to determine magnetic aspect. A 16-channel PFM/PM time-division multiplexed telemeter was used. The time required to sample the 16 channels (one frame period) was 0.323 seconds. Half of the channels were used to convey eight-level digital information, and the others were used for analog information. During ground processing of the telemetered data, the analog information was digitized with an accuracy of 1/100 of full scale. One analog channel was subcommutated in a pattern 16 frames long and was used to telemeter spacecraft temperatures, power system voltages, electric currents, etc. A digital solar aspect sensor measured the spin period and phase, digitized to 0.041 seconds, and the angle between the spin axis and the Sun direction to about 3° intervals. During launch the spacecraft failed to despin. The spin rate ranged from 72.9 to 73.2 rpm during the life of the spacecraft. The spin axis pointed at right ascension 80.97° and declination 20.9°.

== Experiments ==
=== Directional and Omnidirectional Energetic Protons and Electrons ===
The UCSD Particle Experiment consisted of two plastic scintillator detectors. There was a two-level pulse-height discriminator associated with each detector. One detector was oriented perpendicular to the spacecraft spin axis and had a 16° full-angle aperture. Counting rates from the two discrimination levels of this detector yielded information on directional fluxes of electrons with energies above 0.5 MeV. The second detector was omnidirectional, and it separately measured fluxes of protons with energies from 40 MeV to 110 MeV and of electrons with energies above about 4 MeV. Counts in each of the four discrimination states were accumulated for 9.3 seconds once each 69-seconds telemetry sequence. In connection with the directional fluxes, it is significant that 9.3 seconds is about 11.3 times the spacecraft spin period. The detectors functioned normally from 27 October 1962, until 30 January 1963, after which no further data were obtained.

=== Electron and Proton Solid-State Detectors ===
Six diffused silicon p-n junction semiconductor diodes were used to measure the energy spectrum of electrons and protons in the artificial radiation belt. Detector A was sensitive to electrons in the energy range 0.5 to 2.8 MeV and to protons in the range 2.1 to 4.0 MeV. Detectors B through F were sensitive to electrons in the range 0.5 to 2.9 MeV and to protons in the range 2.1 to 22 MeV. The detectors were operated in high and low bias modes, enabling discrimination of protons from electrons. Detectors B and C were located on protruding omnidirectional mounts with a look angle of about 2 pi sr. The other four detectors looked perpendicular to the spin axis of the satellite. The detectors fed through prescalers and log rate meters to 16 analog telemetry channels. Counts were accumulated for 0.15 seconds every 0.3 seconds. All data transmission was in real time. Useful data were obtained from the experiment from launch through 23 December 1962.

=== Fluxgate Magnetometers ===
The purpose of this experiment was to measure the magnitude and direction of the Earth's magnetic field between 1.7 and 3.5 Earth radii. The instrument was a two-axis, saturable-core fluxgate magnetometer. Each axis had a range of plus or minus 4000 nT and an accuracy of 40 nT. The magnetometer was mounted at the end of a boom to minimize the effects of spacecraft fields. Owing to the failure of the spacecraft to despin and the large uncertainty in the field measurements, the data were of little or no value for studies of the geomagnetic field.

=== Proton-Electron Scintillation Detector ===
This experiment was designed to measure the directional fluxes and spectra of low-energy trapped and auroral protons and electrons. It employed a 5-mg-thick powder phosphor scintillator covered with a 1000-A aluminum coating. Additional absorbers were inserted in the detector aperture by a 16-position stepped wheel. The aperture was pointed at 45° to the spin axis. Due to the thinness and type of phosphor, the detector in the pulse mode would respond only to low-energy ions, and, therefore, essentially measured the flux of protons that penetrated the absorbers and stopped in the phosphor. Both the pulse counting rate and the phototube current were telemetered once each frame period. Sixteen readings were telemetered in each wheel position, and thus one complete set of data was obtained every 256 frames (one wheel revolution=80 seconds). Protons in seven energy ranges were measured. The high-energy limit was about 10 MeV for all ranges, and the low-energy cutoffs were 105, 140, 177, 254, 512, 971, and 1668 keV. The energy fluxes of electrons in three ranges were measured separately using scatter geometry, absorbers, and the phototube current. The low-energy cutoffs were 15, 21, and 27 keV, and the high-energy cutoff was about 100 keV for all three ranges. The experiment worked well throughout the life of the spacecraft. However, the directional resolution was poor because the spin rate was higher than planned.

== See also ==
- Explorer program
- Starfish Prime
