= Kosmos 4 =

First Soviet reconnaissance satellite (Zenit 2-2)

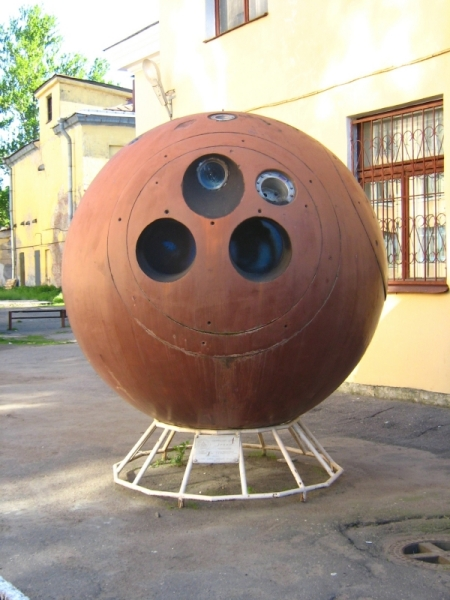
- A Zenit reentry capsule
- Names: Zenit 2-2; Sputnik 14
- Mission type: Optical imaging reconnaissance
- Operator: OKB-1
- Harvard designation: 1962 Xi 1
- COSPAR ID: 1962-014A
- SATCAT no.: 287
- Mission duration: 3 days (4 days planned)

Spacecraft properties
- Spacecraft type: Zenit-2
- Manufacturer: OKB-1
- Launch mass: 4610 kg

Start of mission
- Launch date: 26 April 1962, 10:02:00 GMT
- Rocket: Vostok-K
- Launch site: Baikonur 1/5
- Contractor: OKB-1

End of mission
- Disposal: Recovered
- Landing date: 29 April 1962
- Landing site: Steppe in Kazakhstan

Orbital parameters
- Reference system: Geocentric orbit
- Regime: Low Earth orbit
- Perigee altitude: 285 km
- Apogee altitude: 317 km
- Inclination: 65.0°
- Period: 90.60 minutes

Kosmos 4 (Russian: Космос 4 meaning Kosmos 4), also known as Zenit-2 No.2 and occasionally in the West as Sputnik 14 was the first Soviet reconnaissance satellite to successfully reach orbit.

== Spacecraft ==
Kosmos 4 was a Zenit-2 satellite, a first generation, low resolution reconnaissance satellite derived from the Vostok spacecraft used for crewed flights. It was the fourth satellite to be designated under the Kosmos system, and the second Soviet attempt to launch a reconnaissance satellite, the previous attempt having failed after one of the Vostok-K engines shut down prematurely, on 11 December 1961. Kosmos 4 had a mass of 4,610 kg (10,160 lb).

== Launch ==
It was launched on a Vostok-K rocket, which was making its seventh flight. It was the last Zenit launch to use the Vostok-K, before launches switched to the Vostok-2 starting with the next launch attempt in June 1962. The launch was conducted from Site 1/5 at the Baikonur Cosmodrome, and occurred at 10:02 GMT on 26 April 1962. Kosmos 4 was placed into a low Earth orbit with a perigee of 285 km (177 mi), an apogee of 317 km (197 mi), an inclination of 65.0°, and an orbital period of 90.60 minutes.

== Mission ==
It conducted a four-day mission, to measure radiation before and after the U.S. nuclear tests conducted during project Starfish Prime. However, leaks from the oxygen system tanks used for the orientation system resulted in the premature return of the spacecraft after three days of flight. During most of the flight the spacecraft was uncontrollable, before being deorbited and landing by parachute on 29 April 1962, and recovered by the Soviet forces in the steppe in Kazakhstan.

The next Zenit launch attempt, scheduled for May 1962 but delayed to 1 June 1962, failed to reach orbit, but the next launch successfully reached orbit as Kosmos 7.

== See also ==
- 1962 in spaceflight
