= Kosmos 12 =

Soviet reconnaissance satellite (Zenit 2-7)

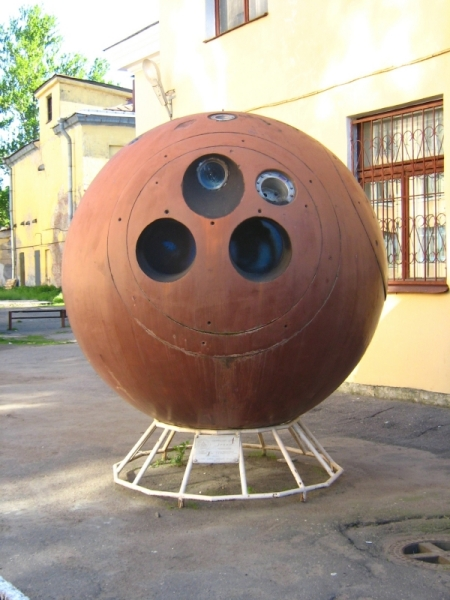
- A Zenit reentry capsule
- Names: Zenit 2-7
- Mission type: Optical imaging reconnaissance
- Operator: Soviet space program
- Harvard designation: 1962 Beta Omega 1
- COSPAR ID: 1962-072A
- SATCAT no.: 517
- Mission duration: 8 days

Spacecraft properties
- Spacecraft type: Zenit-2
- Manufacturer: OKB-1
- Launch mass: 4730 kg

Start of mission
- Launch date: 22 December 1962; 09:21:00 GMT
- Rocket: Vostok-2
- Launch site: Baikonur 1/5
- Contractor: OKB-1

End of mission
- Disposal: Recovered
- Landing date: 30 December 1962
- Landing site: Steppe in Kazakhstan

Orbital parameters
- Reference system: Geocentric
- Regime: Low Earth
- Perigee altitude: 198 km
- Apogee altitude: 392 km
- Inclination: 65.0°
- Period: 90.5 minutes
- Epoch: 22 December 1962

Kosmos 12 (Russian: Космос 12 meaning Cosmos 12) or Zenit-2 No.7 was a Soviet optical film-return reconnaissance satellite launched in 1962. A Zenit-2 spacecraft, Kosmos 12 was the seventh of eighty-one such satellites to be launched.

== Spacecraft ==
Kosmos 12 was a Zenit-2 satellite, a first generation, low resolution, reconnaissance satellite derived from the Vostok spacecraft used for crewed flights, the satellites were developed by OKB-1. In addition to reconnaissance, it was also used for research into radiation in support of the Vostok programme. It had a mass of 4,730 kilograms (10,430 lb).

== Mission ==
The Vostok-2 rocket, serial number T15000-10, was used to launch Kosmos 12. The launch took place from Site 1/5 at the Baikonur Cosmodrome at 09:21:00 GMT on 22 December 1962. Following its successful arrival in orbit, the spacecraft received its Kosmos designation, along with the Harvard designation 1962 Beta Omega 1, the International Designator 1962-072A, and the Satellite Catalog Number 00517.

Kosmos 12 was operated in a low Earth orbit. On 22 December 1962, it had a perigee of 198 kilometres (123 mi), an apogee of 392 kilometres (244 mi), with an inclination of 65.0°, and an orbital period of 90.5 minutes. On 30 December 1962, the spacecraft was deorbited, with its return capsule descending by parachute for recovery by the Soviet forces in the steppe in Kazakhstan.

== See also ==
- 1962 in spaceflight
